= 2014–15 Tulane Green Wave women's basketball team =

Intercollegiate basketball season

2014–15 Tulane Green Wave women's basketball
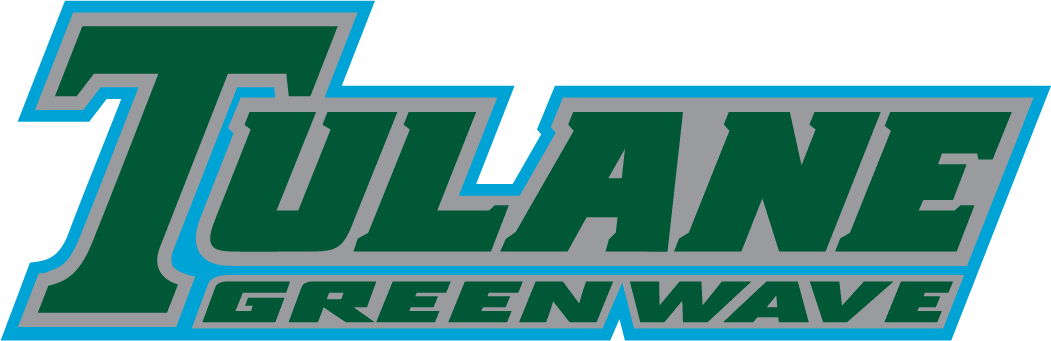

Tulane DoubleTree Classic Champions

NCAA Women's Tournament, first round
- Conference: American Athletic Conference
- Record: 22–11 (11–7 The American)
- Head coach: Lisa Stockton (21st season)
- Assistant coaches: Beth Dunkenberger; Alan Frey; Doshia Woods
- Home arena: Devlin Fieldhouse

2014–15 American Athletic Conference women's basketball standings
	Conf.				Overall
Team	W		L	PCT	W		L	PCT
No. 1 UConn †	18	–	0	1.000	38	–	1	.974
No. 25 South Florida	15	–	3	.833	27	–	8	.771
Tulsa	12	–	6	.667	18	–	14	.563
Temple	12	–	6	.667	20	–	17	.541
East Carolina	11	–	7	.611	22	–	11	.667
Tulane	11	–	7	.611	22	–	11	.667
Memphis	7	–	11	.389	14	–	17	.452
UCF	5	–	13	.278	9	–	21	.300
Cincinnati	4	–	14	.222	8	–	23	.258
SMU	3	–	15	.167	7	–	23	.233
Houston	1	–	17	.056	6	–	24	.200
† American Tournament winner winner As of 7 April 2015; Rankings from AP poll

The 2014–15 Tulane Green Wave women's basketball team represented Tulane University during the 2014–15 NCAA Division I women's basketball season. The season marked the first for the Green Wave as members of the American Athletic Conference. The team, coached by head coach Lisa Stockton, played their home games at the Devlin Fieldhouse. They finished the season 22–11, 11–7 in AAC play to finish in a tie for fifth place. They advanced to the semifinals of the American Athletic women's tournament where they lost to South Florida. They received an at-large bid to the NCAA women's tournament, where they lost to Mississippi State in the first round.

== Media ==
All Green Wave games are broadcast on WRBH 88.3 FM. A video stream for all home games is on Tulane All-Access, ESPN3, or AAC Digital. Road games are typically streamed on the opponents website, though conference road games could also appear on ESPN3 or AAC Digital.

== Roster ==
2014–15 Tulane Green Wave women's basketball team
Players
Coaches

Pos.	#	Name	Height	Year	Previous school	Hometown
G	1	Brook LaFloe	5 ft 2 in (1.57 m)	Jr	Johnson	St. Paul, Minnesota
G	3	Kolby Morgan	5 ft 8 in (1.73 m)	Fr	John Curtis Christian	Hammond, Louisiana
G	11	Leslie Vorpahl	5 ft 6 in (1.68 m)	So	Winston Churchill	San Antonio, Texas
G	13	Caylah Cruickshank	5 ft 9 in (1.75 m)	Fr	Dawson College	Montreal, Quebec
F	15	Adesuwa Ebomwonyi	5 ft 10 in (1.78 m)	Sr	Pflugerville	Pflugerville, Texas
G	20	Danielle Blagg	5 ft 11 in (1.8 m)	Sr	Smithson Valley	San Antonio, Texas
F	22	Tiffany Dale	6 ft 1 in (1.85 m)	Sr	Community	Lavon, Texas
G	23	Jamie Kaplan	5 ft 8 in (1.73 m)	Sr	Florida Air Academy	Sebastian, Florida
F	24	Paije Hall	6 ft 2 in (1.88 m)	RS Fr	St. Thomas More	Lafayette, Louisiana
G	30	Tierra Jones	5 ft 9 in (1.75 m)	RS Jr	Bob Jones	Madison, Alabama
G	33	Courtnie Latham	5 ft 11 in (1.8 m)	So	Clear Springs	Houston, Texas
C	42	Morgan Rogers	6 ft 3 in (1.91 m)	RS So	Loyola Prep	Shreveport, Louisiana
C	45	Chinwe Duru	6 ft 2 in (1.88 m)	Jr	Vista Ridge	Round Rock, Texas

Head coach

- Lisa Stockton (Wake Forest)

Assistant coach(es)

- Beth Dunkenberger (Randolph-Macon)
- Alan Frey (New Orleans)
- Doshia Woods (Western Illinois)

Legend

- (C) Team captain
- (S) Suspended
- (I) Ineligible
- (W) Walk-on
- Injured
- Current redshirt

Roster
Last update: 2014-08-23

== Schedule and results ==
Date time, TV	Rank^{#}	Opponent^{#}	Result	Record	Site (attendance) city, state
Non-conference regular season
11/14/2014*; 7:00 pm		Mississippi Valley State	W 87–47	1–0	Devlin Fieldhouse (886); New Orleans, LA
11/16/2014*; 2:00 pm		at McNeese State	W 75–55	2–0	Burton Coliseum (384); Lake Charles, LA
11/19/2014*; 7:00 pm		at LSU	W 51–45	3–0	Maravich Center (2,111); Baton Rouge, LA
11/24/2014*; 5:00 pm		NC State	W 60–51	4–0	Devlin Fieldhouse (648); New Orleans, LA
11/28/2014*; 11:00 am		vs. WKU; Hofstra Tournament semifinals	L 64–69	4–1	Hofstra Arena (N/A); Hempstead, NY
11/29/2014*; 1:00 pm		vs. Northern Iowa; Hofstra Tournament consolation 3rd place game	W 71–48	5–1	Hofstra Arena (N/A); Hempstead, NY
12/03/2014*; 7:00 pm		Nicholls State	W 77–44	6–1	Devlin Fieldhouse (843); New Orleans, LA
12/06/2014*; 12:00 pm		at Arkansas–Little Rock	W 74–58	7–1	Jack Stephens Center (529); Little Rock, AR
12/18/2014*; 7:00 pm		Samford; Tulane DoubleTree Classic	W 58–56	8–1	Devlin Fieldhouse (N/A); New Orleans, LA
12/19/2014*; 7:00 pm		Miami (FL); Tulane DoubleTree Classic	W 70–65	9–1	Devlin Fieldhouse (1,022); New Orleans, LA
12/22/2014*; 7:00 pm		Florida State	L 54–65	9–2	Devlin Fieldhouse (1,000); New Orleans, LA
Conference regular season
12/28/2014; 1:00 pm		at Cincinnati	W 60–50	10–2 (1–0)	Fifth Third Arena (531); Cincinnati, OH
12/30/2014; 7:00 pm, ADN		Houston	W 70–40	11–2 (2–0)	Devlin Fieldhouse (644); New Orleans, LA
01/04/2015; 4:30 pm, CBSSN		South Florida	L 40–53	11–3 (2–1)	Devlin Fieldhouse (1,587); New Orleans, LA
01/07/2015; 6:00 pm, ESPN3		at East Carolina	W 76–63	12–3 (3–1)	Williams Arena (998); Greenville, NC
01/13/2015; 6:00 pm		at UCF	W 71–70	13–3 (4–1)	CFE Arena (1,121); Orlando, FL
01/17/2015; 2:00 pm, ADN		SMU	W 60–58	14–3 (5–1)	Devlin Fieldhouse (868); New Orleans, LA
01/20/2015; 7:00 pm, ADN		Tulsa	W 73–34	15–3 (6–1)	Devlin Fieldhouse (825); New Orleans, LA
01/25/2015; 3:00 pm, CBSSN		at South Florida	L 45–64	15–4 (6–2)	USF Sun Dome (1,488); Tampa, FL
01/27/2014; 7:00 pm		at Houston	W 63–46	16–4 (7–2)	Hofheinz Pavilion (340); Houston, TX
01/31/2015; 2:00 pm, ESPN3		East Carolina	L 63–67	16–5 (7–3)	Devlin Fieldhouse (1,400); New Orleans, LA
02/03/2015; 7:00 pm, ADN		at SMU	W 84–60	17–5 (8–3)	Moody Coliseum (641); Dallas, TX
02/07/2015; 7:00 pm, ADN		Temple	W 77–63	18–5 (9–3)	Devlin Fieldhouse (1,366); New Orleans, LA
02/10/2015; 7:00 pm, ADN		UCF	W 66–55	19–5 (10–3)	Devlin Fieldhouse (1,072); New Orleans, LA
02/14/2015; 3:00 pm, CBSSN		at No. 2 Connecticut	L 39–87	19–6 (10–4)	Gampel Pavilion (9,347); Storrs, CT
02/17/2015; 6:00 pm, ESPN3		at Temple	L 58–69	19–7 (10–5)	McGonigle Hall (651); Philadelphia, PA
02/21/2015; 2:00 pm, ADN		Memphis	W 75–65	20–7 (11–5)	Devlin Fieldhouse (2,213); New Orleans, LA
02/23/2015; 7:00 pm, SNY		No. 1 Connecticut	L 47–94	20–8 (11–6)	Devlin Fieldhouse (1,900); New Orleans, LA
02/28/2015; 2:00 pm		at Tulsa	L 52–55	20–9 (11–7)	Reynolds Center (500); Tulsa, OK
2015 AAC Tournament
03/06/2015; 7:00 pm, ESPN3		vs. Houston; First Round	W 61–39	21–9	Mohegan Sun Arena (4,669); Uncasville, CT
03/07/2015; 7:00 pm, ESPN3		vs. Tulsa; Quarterfinals	W 71–53	22–9	Mohegan Sun Arena (5,177); Uncasville, CT
03/08/2015; 6:30 pm, ESPNU		vs. South Florida; Semifinals	L 69–78	22–10	Mohegan Sun Arena (6,531); Uncasville, CT
NCAA Women's Tournament
03/20/2015*; 2:30 pm, ESPN2		vs. No. 12 Mississippi State; First Round	L 47–57	22–11	Cameron Indoor Stadium (2,712); Durham, NC
*Non-conference game. ^{#}Rankings from AP Poll. (#) Tournament seedings in parentheses. All times are in Central Time.

== Rankings ==
2014–15 NCAA Division I women's basketball rankings

Regular season polls
Poll	Pre- Season	Week 2	Week 3	Week 4	Week 5	Week 6	Week 7	Week 8	Week 9	Week 10	Week 11	Week 12	Week 13	Week 14	Week 15	Week 16	Week 17	Week 18	Final
AP	NR	NR	NR	NR	NR	NR	NR	NR	NR	NR	NR	NR	NR	NR	NR	NR	NR	NR	NR
Coaches	NR	NR	NR	NR	RV	RV	RV	RV	NR	NR	RV	NR	NR	NR	NR	NR	NR	NR	RV

Legend
	Increase in ranking
	Decrease in ranking
	No change
(RV)	Received votes
(NR)	Not ranked

== See also ==
- 2014–15 Tulane Green Wave men's basketball team
