= 2014–15 SMU Mustangs women's basketball team =

Intercollegiate basketball season

2014–15 SMU Mustangs women's basketball
- Conference: American Athletic Conference
- Record: 7–23 (3–15 The American)
- Head coach: Rhonda Rompola (24th season)
- Assistant coaches: Lisa Dark; Deneen Parker; Danny Hughes
- Home arena: Moody Coliseum

2014–15 American Athletic Conference women's basketball standings
	Conf.				Overall
Team	W		L	PCT	W		L	PCT
No. 1 UConn †	18	–	0	1.000	38	–	1	.974
No. 25 South Florida	15	–	3	.833	27	–	8	.771
Tulsa	12	–	6	.667	18	–	14	.563
Temple	12	–	6	.667	20	–	17	.541
East Carolina	11	–	7	.611	22	–	11	.667
Tulane	11	–	7	.611	22	–	11	.667
Memphis	7	–	11	.389	14	–	17	.452
UCF	5	–	13	.278	9	–	21	.300
Cincinnati	4	–	14	.222	8	–	23	.258
SMU	3	–	15	.167	7	–	23	.233
Houston	1	–	17	.056	6	–	24	.200
† American Tournament winner winner As of 7 April 2015; Rankings from AP poll

The 2014–15 SMU Mustangs women's basketball team represented Southern Methodist University in the 2014–15 NCAA Division I women's basketball season. The Mustangs played their home games at Moody Coliseum. The 2014–15 season was the second season the Mustangs will participate in the American Athletic Conference. The Mustangs were coached by 24th year head coach Rhonda Rompola. They finished the season 7–23, 3–15 in AAC play to finish in tenth place. They lost in the first round in the American Athletic women's tournament to Memphis.

== Media ==
All Pony Express games will air on KAAM. Before conference season home games will be streamed on Pony Up TV. Conference home games will rotate between ESPN3, AAC Digital, and Pony Up TV. Road games will typically be streamed on the opponents website, though conference road games could also appear on ESPN3 or AAC Digital.

== 2014–15 Roster ==
2014–15 SMU Mustangs women's basketball team
Players
Coaches

Pos.	#	Name	Height	Year	Previous school	Hometown
G	12	Morgan Bolton	5 ft 6 in (1.68 m)	RS So	Ark.-Little Rock	Duncanville, Texas
F	25	Taylor Brame	5 ft 11 in (1.8 m)	Fr	Whitney Young	Chicago, Ill.
G	5	Aurmani DeGar	5 ft 8 in (1.73 m)	Fr	Mansfield Timberview	Arlington, Texas
F	10	Alicia Froling	6 ft 3 in (1.91 m)	Fr	Australia Institute of Sport	Queensland, Australia
F	11	Keely Froling	6 ft 2 in (1.88 m)	Fr	Australia Institute of Sport	Queensland, Australia
F	31	Destynee Hives-McCray	6 ft 0 in (1.83 m)	RS Jr	Martin	Arlington, Texas
G	0	Kiara Perry	5 ft 10 in (1.78 m)	So	Duncanville	Duncanville, Texas
G	4	Mikayla Reese	5 ft 8 in (1.73 m)	Fr	Sand Creek	Colorado Springs, Colo.
G	32	Raven Short	5 ft 11 in (1.8 m)	RS Sr	Marcus	Flower Mound, Texas
G	3	Gabrielle Wilkins	5 ft 9 in (1.75 m)	Jr	Garland	Garland, Texas

Head coach

Rhonda Rampola (SMU)

Assistant coach(es)

Lisa Dark (SMU)
Deneen Parker (Stephen F. Austin)
Danny Hughes (TCU)

Legend

- (C) Team captain
- (S) Suspended
- (I) Ineligible
- (W) Walk-on
- Injured
- Current redshirt

Roster
Last update: 2014-09-14

== Schedule and results ==
Date time, TV	Rank^{#}	Opponent^{#}	Result	Record	Site (attendance) city, state
Regular Season
11/14/2014*; 6:00 pm		Northern Colorado	L 44–57	0–1	Moody Coliseum (7,000); Dallas, TX
11/16/2014*; 2:00 pm		UTEP	W 63–59	1–1	Moody Coliseum (347); Dallas, TX
11/19/2014*; 12:00 pm		at TCU	L 62–72	1–2	Student Recreation Center (1,379); Fort Worth, TX
11/22/2014*; 2:00 pm		Eastern Washington	W 69–53	2–2	Moody Coliseum (N/A); Dallas, TX
11/28/2014*; 7:00 pm		Florida A&M; SMU Thanksgiving Classic semifinals	W 77–46	3–2	Moody Coliseum (738); Dallas, TX
11/29/2014*; 7:00 pm		USC; SMU Thanksgiving Classic championship	L 57–64	3–3	Moody Coliseum (641); Dallas, TX
12/03/2014*; 7:00 pm		North Texas	W 62–55	4–3	Moody Coliseum (937); Dallas, TX
12/06/2014*; 4:00 pm, P12N		at Arizona State	L 42–77	4–4	Wells Fargo Arena (1,634); Tempe, AZ
12/09/2014*; 7:00 pm		No. 4 Texas A&M	L 62–70	4–5	Moody Coliseum (1,155); Dallas, TX
12/20/2014*; 1:00 pm, ESPN3		vs. Indiana State; St. John's Invitational semifinals	L 55–64	4–6	Carnesecca Arena (967); Queens, NY
12/21/2014*; 12:00 pm, ESPN3		vs. Auburn; St. John's Invitational Consolation Game	L 43–56	4–7	Carnesecca Arena (N/A); Queens, NY
12/27/2014; 12:00 pm, SNY		at No. 2 Connecticut	L 45–96	4–8 (0–1)	XL Center (9,972); Hartford, CT
12/30/2014; 6:00 pm		at Temple	L 64–77	4–9 (0–2)	McGonigle Hall (903); Philadelphia, PA
01/03/2015; 2:00 pm, ADN		Houston	L 45–63	4–10 (0–3)	Moody Coliseum (907); Dallas, TX
01/11/2015; 2:00 pm, SNY		No. 2 Connecticut	L 28–87	4–11 (0–4)	Moody Coliseum (2,606); Dallas, TX
01/14/2015; 6:00 pm, ESPN3		at South Florida	L 59–82	4–12 (0–5)	USF Sun Dome (1,673); Tampa, FL
01/17/2015; 2:00 pm, ADN		at Tulane	L 58–60	4–13 (0–6)	Devlin Fieldhouse (868); New Orleans, LA
01/21/2015; 7:00 pm, ESPN3		East Carolina	L 49–67	4–14 (0–7)	Moody Coliseum (725); Dallas, TX
01/25/2015; 1:00 pm, ESPNU		UCF	L 57–61	4–15 (0–8)	Moody Coliseum (876); Dallas, TX
01/28/2015; 7:00 pm		at Tulsa	L 58–74	4–16 (0–9)	Reynolds Center (784); Tulsa, OK
02/03/2015; 7:00 pm		Tulane	L 60–84	4–17 (0–10)	Moody Coliseum (641); Dallas, TX
02/07/2015; 1:00 pm		at UCF	W 70–60	5–17 (1–10)	CFE Arena (2,693); Orlando, FL
02/10/2015; 7:00 pm, ADN		No. 25 South Florida	L 51–72	5–18 (1–11)	Moody Coliseum (494); Dallas, TX
02/14/2015; 2:00 pm		Tulsa	L 59–72	5–19 (1–12)	Moody Coliseum (685); Dallas, TX
02/18/2015; 6:00 pm, ESPN3		at East Carolina	L 53–67	5–20 (1–13)	Williams Arena (1,196); Greenville, NC
02/21/2015; 2:00 pm, ADN		at Houston	W 68–51	6–20 (2–13)	Hofheinz Pavilion (915); Houston, TX
02/25/2015; 7:00 pm, ADN		Temple	L 39–55	6–21 (2–14)	Moody Coliseum (534); Dallas, TX
02/28/2015; 2:00 pm, ADN		Cincinnati	L 46–56	6–22 (2–15)	Moody Coliseum (640); Dallas, TX
03/02/2015; 7:00 pm		at Memphis	W 60–53	7–22 (3–15)	Elma Roane Fieldhouse (912); Memphis, TN
2015 AAC Tournament
03/06/2015; 5:00 pm, ESPN3		vs. Memphis; First Round	L 59–71	7–23	Mohegan Sun Arena (N/A); Uncasville, CT
*Non-conference game. ^{#}Rankings from AP Poll. (#) Tournament seedings in parentheses. All times are in Central Time.

== See also ==
- 2014–15 SMU Mustangs men's basketball team
- SMU Mustangs women's basketball
