= 2014–15 East Carolina Pirates women's basketball team =

Intercollegiate basketball season

2014–15 East Carolina Pirates women's basketball

WNIT, Second Round
- Conference: American Athletic Conference
- Record: 22–11 (11–7 The American)
- Head coach: Heather Macy (5th season)
- Assistant coaches: John Marcum (2nd season); Dalila Eshe (1st season); Crayton Jones (1st season)
- Home arena: Williams Arena

2014–15 American Athletic Conference women's basketball standings
	Conf.				Overall
Team	W		L	PCT	W		L	PCT
No. 1 UConn †	18	–	0	1.000	38	–	1	.974
No. 25 South Florida	15	–	3	.833	27	–	8	.771
Tulsa	12	–	6	.667	18	–	14	.563
Temple	12	–	6	.667	20	–	17	.541
East Carolina	11	–	7	.611	22	–	11	.667
Tulane	11	–	7	.611	22	–	11	.667
Memphis	7	–	11	.389	14	–	17	.452
UCF	5	–	13	.278	9	–	21	.300
Cincinnati	4	–	14	.222	8	–	23	.258
SMU	3	–	15	.167	7	–	23	.233
Houston	1	–	17	.056	6	–	24	.200
† American Tournament winner winner As of 7 April 2015; Rankings from AP poll

The 2014–15 East Carolina Pirates women's basketball team represented East Carolina University during the 2014–15 NCAA Division I women's basketball season. The season marked the first for the Pirates as members of the American Athletic Conference. The team, coached by 5th year head coach Heather Macy, played their home games at Williams Arena at Minges Coliseum. They finished the season 22–11, 11–7 in AAC play to finish in a tie for fifth place. They advanced to the quarterfinals of the American Athletic women's tournament, where they lost to Connecticut. They were invited to the Women's National Invitational Tournament, where they defeated Radford in the first round before losing to NC State in the second round.

== Media ==
All Pirates home games will have a video stream on Pirates All Access, ESPN3, or AAC Digital. Road games will typically be streamed on the opponents website, though conference road games could also appear on ESPN3 or AAC Digital. Audio broadcasts for most road games can also be found on the opponents website.

== Roster ==
2014–15 East Carolina Pirates women's basketball team
Players
Coaches

Pos.	#	Name	Height	Year	Previous school	Hometown
F	1	Shae Nelson	6 ft 1 in (1.85 m)	Sr	Cordova	Cordova, Tennessee
G	2	Khadidja Toure	5 ft 9 in (1.75 m)	Jr	Kamiakan	Kennewick, Washington
G	3	Akia Jones	5 ft 7 in (1.7 m)	Sr	Glencliff	Nashville, Tennessee
G	4	DeVaughn Gray	5 ft 11 in (1.8 m)	Jr	Booker T. Washington	Tulsa, Oklahoma
F	5	Chelsie Keys	6 ft 0 in (1.83 m)	Jr	Muskogee	Muskogee, Oklahoma
G	11	Khadijha Ellison	5 ft 7 in (1.7 m)	Jr	Burke	Roxbury, Massachusetts
F	20	Tatiana Chapelle	6 ft 0 in (1.83 m)	Sr	Northland	Columbus, Ohio
G/F	21	Abria Trice	6 ft 1 in (1.85 m)	RS Sr	Dutchtown	Hampton, Georgia
G/F	23	Jada Payne	6 ft 3 in (1.91 m)	RS Jr	Hickory	Hickory, North Carolina
F	24	I'Tiana Taylor	6 ft 1 in (1.85 m)	Jr	Pflugerville	Pflugerville, Texas
F	25	Jenka Stiasna	6 ft 3 in (1.91 m)	So	Rock	Zvolen, Slovakia
G	33	Janesha Ebron	5 ft 6 in (1.68 m)	Sr	South Central	Winterville, North Carolina
G/F	40	Gabrielle Holston	6 ft 0 in (1.83 m)	So	Center Point	Margaret, Alabama
F	40	Ondrea Shaw	6 ft 4 in (1.93 m)	Sr	Moore	Los Angeles, California
F	55	Marina Laramie	6 ft 3 in (1.91 m)	Jr	Ft. Zumwalt West	St. Louis, Missouri

Head coach

- Heather Macy (Greensboro)

Assistant coach(es)

- John Marcum (Oklahoma Baptist)
- Dalila Eshe (Florida)
- Crayton Jones (Francis Marion)

Legend

- (C) Team captain
- (S) Suspended
- (I) Ineligible
- (W) Walk-on
- Injured
- Current redshirt

Roster

== Schedule and results ==
Date time, TV	Rank^{#}	Opponent^{#}	Result	Record	Site (attendance) city, state
Regular Season
11/14/2014*; 2:00 pm		vs. Fairfield; URI Tip-Off	W 83–68	1–0	Ryan Center (908); Kingston, RI
11/15/2014*; 3:00 pm		at Rhode Island; URI Tip-Off	W 66–38	2–0	Ryan Center (633); Kingston, RI
11/19/2014*; 7:00 pm		College of Charleston	W 68–55	3–0	Williams Arena (1,162); Greenville, NC
11/21/2014*; 11:30 am		Delaware	W 89–60	4–0	Williams Arena (4,935); Greenville, NC
11/23/2014*; 2:00 pm		Bethune-Cookman	W 71–42	5–0	Williams Arena (1,329); Greenville, NC
11/27/2014*; 2:00 pm		vs. No. 22 Syracuse; Junkanoo Jam semifinals	L 58–69	5–1	St. George HS Gymnasium (150); Freeport, BAH
11/28/2014*; 5:45 pm		vs. Wisconsin; Junkanoo Jam consolation 3rd place game	W 61–43	6–1	St. George HS Gymnasium (150); Freeport, BAH
12/04/2014*; 7:00 pm		at Cleveland State	L 57–59	6–2	Wolstein Center (207); Cleveland, OH
12/06/2014*; 7:00 pm		at Ohio	W 76–68	7–2	Convocation Center (707); Athens, OH
12/09/2014*; 7:00 pm		at Loyola (MD)	W 82–33	8–2	Reitz Arena (211); Baltimore, MD
12/20/2014*; 5:00 pm		Norfolk State	W 65–36	9–2	Williams Arena (1,066); Greenville, NC
12/28/2014; 12:00 pm, ESPNU		at South Florida	L 62–69	9–3 (0–1)	USF Sun Dome (3,513); Tampa, FL
12/31/2014; 2:30 pm, SNY		No. 2 Connecticut	L 38–89	9–4 (0–2)	Williams Arena (4,706); Greenville, NC
01/04/2015; 3:00 pm		at Memphis	L 57–60 ^{OT}	9–5 (0–3)	Elma Roane Fieldhouse (728); Memphis, TN
01/07/2015; 7:00 pm, ESPN3		Tulane	L 63–76	9–6 (0–4)	Williams Arena (998); Greenville, NC
01/10/2015; 3:00 pm		at Houston	W 87–46	10–6 (1–4)	Hofheinz Pavilion (355); Houston, TX
01/14/2015; 8:00 pm, ADN		at Tulsa	W 77–68	11–6 (2–4)	Reynolds Center (787); Tulsa, OK
01/18/2015; 2:00 pm		Memphis	W 60–39	12–6 (3–4)	Williams Arena (1,277); Greenville, NC
01/21/2015; 8:00 pm, ESPN3		at SMU	W 67–49	13–6 (4–4)	Moody Coliseum (725); Dallas, TX
01/24/2015; 2:30 pm, ESPN3		Tulsa	L 63–74	13–7 (4–5)	Williams Arena (1,417); Greenville, NC
01/28/2015; 7:00 pm, SNY		at No. 2 Connecticut	L 32–87	13–8 (4–6)	XL Center (7,269); Hartford, CT
01/31/2015; 3:00 pm, ESPN3		at Tulane	W 67–63	14–8 (5–6)	Devlin Fieldhouse (1,400); New Orleans, LA
02/03/2015; 7:00 pm		Houston	W 79–56	15–8 (6–6)	Williams Arena (1,147); Greenville, NC
02/10/2015; 7:00 pm		at Cincinnati	W 78–53	16–8 (7–6)	Fifth Third Arena (460); Cincinnati, OH
02/15/2015; 2:00 pm, ESPNU		No. 25 South Florida	W 65–64	17–8 (8–6)	Williams Arena (1,646); Greenville, NC
02/18/2015; 7:00 pm, ESPN3		SMU	W 67–53	18–8 (9–6)	Williams Arena (1,196); Greenville, NC
02/21/2015; 1:30 pm, ESPN3		Cincinnati	W 53–40	19–8 (10–6)	Williams Arena (1,204); Greenville, NC
02/28/2015; 2:00 pm, ESPN3		at Temple	L 69–79	19–9 (10–7)	McGonigle Hall (1,196); Philadelphia, PA
03/02/2015; 7:00 pm, ADN		UCF	W 67–57	20–9 (11–7)	Williams Arena (1,213); Greenville, NC
AAC Women's Tournament
03/07/2015; 12:00 pm, ESPN3		vs. Temple; Quarterfinals	W 77–71	21–9	Mohegan Sun Arena (N/A); Uncasville, CT
03/08/2015; 5:30 pm, ESPNU		vs. No. 1 Connecticut; Semifinals	L 56–106	21–10	Mohegan Sun Arena (6,531); Uncasville, CT
WNIT
03/18/2015*; 7:00 pm		Radford; First Round	W 74–52	22–10	Williams Arena (877); Greenville, NC
03/22/2015*; 4:00 pm		NC State; Second Round	L 65–69	22–11	Williams Arena (2,160); Greenville, NC
*Non-conference game. ^{#}Rankings from AP Poll. (#) Tournament seedings in parentheses. All times are in Eastern Time.

== See also ==
- 2014–15 East Carolina Pirates men's basketball team
