= 2014–15 Memphis Tigers women's basketball team =

Intercollegiate basketball season

2014–15 Memphis Tigers women's basketball
- Conference: American Athletic Conference
- Record: 14–17 (7–11 The American)
- Head coach: Melissa McFerrin (7th season)
- Assistant coaches: David Midlick (1st season); Erin Grant (3rd season); Jessica Bogia (2nd season)
- Home arena: Elma Roane Fieldhouse; FedEx Forum

2014–15 American Athletic Conference women's basketball standings
	Conf.				Overall
Team	W		L	PCT	W		L	PCT
No. 1 UConn †	18	–	0	1.000	38	–	1	.974
No. 25 South Florida	15	–	3	.833	27	–	8	.771
Tulsa	12	–	6	.667	18	–	14	.563
Temple	12	–	6	.667	20	–	17	.541
East Carolina	11	–	7	.611	22	–	11	.667
Tulane	11	–	7	.611	22	–	11	.667
Memphis	7	–	11	.389	14	–	17	.452
UCF	5	–	13	.278	9	–	21	.300
Cincinnati	4	–	14	.222	8	–	23	.258
SMU	3	–	15	.167	7	–	23	.233
Houston	1	–	17	.056	6	–	24	.200
† American Tournament winner winner As of 7 April 2015; Rankings from AP poll

The 2014–15 Memphis Tigers women's basketball team represented the University of Memphis during the 2014–15 NCAA Division I women's basketball season. The season marked the second for the Tigers as members of the American Athletic Conference. The team, coached by head coach Melissa McFerrin, played their home games at the Elma Roane Fieldhouse with one game at the FedEx Forum. They finished the season 14–17, 7–11 in AAC play to finish in seventh place. They advanced to the quarterfinals of the American Athletic women's tournament, where they lost to South Florida.

== Media ==
All Tigers home games will have a radio broadcast live on WUMR. Video streaming for all home games will be available on the Memphis Tiger Network, ESPN3, or AAC Digital. Road games will typically be streamed on the opponents website, though conference road games could also appear on ESPN3 or AAC Digital.

== Roster ==
2014–15 Memphis Tigers women's basketball team
Players
Coaches

Pos.	#	Name	Height	Year	Previous school	Hometown
C	0	Angelina Williams	6 ft 4 in (1.93 m)	Fr	Searcy	Searcy, Arkansas
G	1	Breigha Wilder-Cochran	5 ft 9 in (1.75 m)	So	Hoover	Hoover, Alabama
G	3	Taylor Williams	6 ft 1 in (1.85 m)	So	Bishop Ward	Kansas City, Kansas
G	4	Ariel Hearn	5 ft 7 in (1.7 m)	Jr	Arlington	Memphis, Tennessee
G	5	Brea Elmore	5 ft 9 in (1.75 m)	Fr	Redan	Stone Mountain, Georgia
F	10	Cheyenne Creighton	6 ft 1 in (1.85 m)	Fr	Blessed Pope John Paul II	Pickering, Ontario
G	11	Amber Holmes	5 ft 7 in (1.7 m)	Fr	Overton	Memphis, Tennessee
F	21	Asianna Fuqua-Bey	6 ft 1 in (1.85 m)	Jr	Marist	Chicago, Illinois
F	22	Brianna Wright	6 ft 1 in (1.85 m)	Jr	Chipola JC; South Alabama	Greenville, Mississippi
G	24	Mooriah Rowser	5 ft 9 in (1.75 m)	So	St. John's College HS	Rockville, Maryland
F	32	Courtney Powell	6 ft 1 in (1.85 m)	Jr	Ursuline	Youngstown, Ohio
F	33	Brandi Goodman	6 ft 2 in (1.88 m)	So	Obion County Central	Troy, Tennessee
G	40	Damonique Miller	5 ft 11 in (1.8 m)	Fr	Joe T. Robinson	Little Rock, Arkansas
F	44	Alisha Celestine	6 ft 3 in (1.91 m)	Fr	Warren Easton	Kenner, Louisiana

Head coach

- Melissa McFerrin (Missouri)

Assistant coach(es)

- David Midlick (Mississippi)
- Erin Grant (Texas Tech)
- Jessica Bogia (Lafayette)

Legend

- (C) Team captain
- (S) Suspended
- (I) Ineligible
- (W) Walk-on
- Injured
- Current redshirt

Roster
Last update: 2014-07-15

== Schedule and results ==
Date time, TV	Rank^{#}	Opponent^{#}	Result	Record	Site (attendance) city, state
Exhibition
11/08/2014*; 2:00 pm		Rhodes College	W 79–26	–	Elma Roane Fieldhouse (753); Memphis, TN
Regular Season
11/14/2014*; 4:00 pm		Missouri State	W 79–63	1–0	Elma Roane Fieldhouse (582); Memphis, TN
11/16/2014*; 4:00 pm		Samford	W 64–48	2–0	Elma Roane Fieldhouse (867); Memphis, TN
11/20/2014*; 7:00 pm		at Illinois	L 58–60	2–1	State Farm Center (1,250); Champaign, IL
11/23/2014*; 2:00 pm		Minnesota	L 62–68	2–2	Elma Roane Fieldhouse (892); Memphis, TN
11/26/2014*; 6:05 pm		at Southern Illinois	L 75–82	2–3	SIU Arena (527); Carbondale, IL
11/29/2014*; 2:00 pm		Arkansas–Little Rock	L 59–66	2–4	Elma Roane Fieldhouse (528); Memphis, TN
12/02/2014*; 8:00 pm		Austin Peay	W 65–60	3–4	Elma Roane Fieldhouse (673); Memphis, TN
12/06/2014*; 2:00 pm		Central Michigan	W 62–61	4–4	Elma Roane Fieldhouse (523); Memphis, TN
12/13/2014*; 11:00 am		at Georgetown	W 63–46	5–4	McDonough Gymnasium (255); Washington, D.C.
12/15/2014*; 6:00 pm		at George Washington	L 44–63	5–5	Charles E. Smith Center (421); Washington, D.C.
12/19/2014*; 7:00 pm		Mississippi Valley State	W 62–39	6–5	Elma Roane Fieldhouse (517); Memphis, TN
12/28/2014; 7:30 pm, ESPNU		Temple	L 57–58	6–6 (0–1)	Elma Roane Fieldhouse (1,278); Memphis, TN
12/31/2014; 2:00 pm		at South Florida	L 39–72	6–7 (0–2)	USF Sun Dome (1,350); Tampa, FL
01/04/2015; 2:00 pm		East Carolina	W 60–57 ^{OT}	7–7 (1–2)	Elma Roane Fieldhouse (728); Memphis, TN
01/07/2015; 6:00 pm, ESPN3		at UCF	W 70–66	8–7 (2–2)	CFE Arena (1,040); Orlando, FL
01/10/2015; 2:00 pm, ADN		at Tulsa	L 69–79	8–8 (2–3)	Reynolds Center (908); Tulsa, OK
01/14/2015; 7:00 pm, ESPN3		Cincinnati	W 41–38	9–8 (3–3)	Elma Roane Fieldhouse (549); Memphis, TN
01/18/2015; 1:00 pm		at East Carolina	L 39–60	9–9 (3–4)	Williams Arena (1,277); Greenville, NC
01/24/2015; 2:00 pm, ADN		Houston	W 84–49	10–9 (4–4)	Elma Roane Fieldhouse (1,327); Memphis, TN
01/28/2015; 6:00 pm, ADN		at Cincinnati	W 56–44	11–9 (5–4)	Fifth Third Arena (414); Cincinnati, OH
01/31/2015; 2:00 pm, ESPN3		South Florida	L 53–57	11–10 (5–5)	Elma Roane Fieldhouse (1,930); Memphis, TN
02/04/2015; 11:00 am, ADN		at Temple	L 61–84	11–11 (5–6)	Liacouras Center (2,814); Philadelphia, PA
02/07/2015; 2:30 pm, SNY		No. 2 Connecticut	L 34–80	11–12 (5–7)	FedEx Forum (2,267); Memphis, TN
02/11/2015; 7:00 pm		at Houston	W 64–58	12–12 (6–7)	Hofheinz Pavilion (463); Houston, TX
02/18/2015; 7:00 pm		UCF; Postponed from 2/17	W 65–49	13–12 (7–7)	Elma Roane Fieldhouse (511); Memphis, TN
02/21/2015; 2:00 pm, ADN		at Tulane	L 65–75	13–13 (7–8)	Devlin Fieldhouse (2,213); New Orleans, LA
02/24/2015; 7:00 pm, ADN		Tulsa	L 62–65	13–14 (7–9)	Elma Roane Fieldhouse (1,121); Memphis, TN
02/28/2015; 1:00 pm, CBSSN		at No. 1 Connecticut	L 24–87	13–15 (7–10)	Gampel Pavilion (10,167); Storrs, CT
03/02/2015; 7:00 pm		SMU	L 53–60	13–16 (7–11)	Elma Roane Fieldhouse (912); Memphis, TN
2015 AAC Tournament
03/06/2015; 5:00 pm, ESPN3		vs. SMU; First Round	W 71–59	14–16	Mohegan Sun Arena (N/A); Uncasville, CT
03/07/2015; 5:00 pm, ESPN3		vs. South Florida; Quarterfinals	L 51–79	14–17	Mohegan Sun Arena (N/A); Uncasville, CT
*Non-conference game. ^{#}Rankings from AP Poll. (#) Tournament seedings in parentheses. All times are in Central Time.

== See also ==
- 2014–15 Memphis Tigers men's basketball team
