= 2014–15 UCF Knights women's basketball team =

Intercollegiate basketball season

2014–15 UCF Knights women's basketball
- Conference: American Athletic Conference
- Record: 9–21 (5–13 The American)
- Head coach: Joi Williams (8th season)
- Assistant coaches: Ken Griffin; Tamisha Augustin; Joe Silvestri
- Home arena: CFE Arena

2014–15 American Athletic Conference women's basketball standings
	Conf.				Overall
Team	W		L	PCT	W		L	PCT
No. 1 UConn †	18	–	0	1.000	38	–	1	.974
No. 25 South Florida	15	–	3	.833	27	–	8	.771
Tulsa	12	–	6	.667	18	–	14	.563
Temple	12	–	6	.667	20	–	17	.541
East Carolina	11	–	7	.611	22	–	11	.667
Tulane	11	–	7	.611	22	–	11	.667
Memphis	7	–	11	.389	14	–	17	.452
UCF	5	–	13	.278	9	–	21	.300
Cincinnati	4	–	14	.222	8	–	23	.258
SMU	3	–	15	.167	7	–	23	.233
Houston	1	–	17	.056	6	–	24	.200
† American Tournament winner winner As of 7 April 2015; Rankings from AP poll

The 2014–15 UCF Knights women's basketball team represented the University of Central Florida during the 2014–15 NCAA Division I basketball season. The Knights competed in Division I of the National Collegiate Athletic Association (NCAA) and the American Athletic Conference (The American). The Knights, in the program's 38th season of basketball, were led by eighth-year head coach Joi Williams, and played their home games at the CFE Arena on the university's main campus in Orlando, Florida. They finished the season 9–21, 5–13 in AAC play to finish in eighth place. They lost in the first round in the American Athletic women's tournament to Cincinnati.

This was UCF's second season as a member of The American. UCF entered the 2014-15 with all the assistant coaches being in their first year with the program.

== Media ==
All UCF games had an audio or video broadcast available. For conference play, UCF games were typically available on ESPN3, AAC Digital, or UCF Knights All-Access. Road games not on ESPN3 or AAC Digital had an audio broadcast available on the UCF portal. All non-conference home games were streamed exclusively on UCF Knights All-Access. Select non-conference road games had a stream available through the opponent's website. The audio broadcast for home games was only available through UCF Knights All-Access.

== 2014–15 roster ==
2014–15 UCF Knights women's basketball team
Players
Coaches

Pos.	#	Name	Height	Year	Previous school	Hometown
G	3	Bryeasha Blair	5 ft 4 in (1.63 m)	RS Jr	Whitney Young HS	Chicago, Ill.
F/C	11	Yanique Gordon	6 ft 4 in (1.93 m)	Sr	Green Island HS	Hanover, Jamaica
G	22	Aliyah Gregory	5 ft 10 in (1.78 m)	Fr	Strawberry Crest	Tampa, Fla.
G	2	Andrea Hines	5 ft 7 in (1.7 m)	Sr	Sanford School	New Castle, Del.
F	5	Kariel Hutt	6 ft 0 in (1.83 m)	Jr	Blue Springs South	Blue Springs, Mo.
G	4	Jordan Jackson	5 ft 9 in (1.75 m)	So	St. Anthony HS	Long Beach, Calif.
G	14	Erica Juarbe	5 ft 9 in (1.75 m)	Jr	Lincoln	Brooklyn, N.Y.
G	5	Zykira Lewis	5 ft 8 in (1.73 m)	So	Bartow HS	Bartow, Fla.
F	32	Joslyn Massey	6 ft 0 in (1.83 m)	Jr	John Glenn	Detroit, Mich.
F	13	Brittni Montgomery	6 ft 3 in (1.91 m)	RS Sr	Fort Pierce Central	Fort Pierce, Fla.
F	24	Fifi Ndour	6 ft 1 in (1.85 m)	Fr	Montverde Academy	Dakar, Senegal
F	21	Makenzi Reasor	6 ft 2 in (1.88 m)	RS So	Mount Vernon HS	Fortville, Ind
F	12	Nyala Shuler	6 ft 0 in (1.83 m)	Fr	Edgewater	Orlando, Fla.
F	42	Stephanie Taylor	6 ft 2 in (1.88 m)	Sr	Sun Valley HS	Indian Trail, N.C.
			—

Head coach

Joi Williams (South Florida)

Assistant coach(es)

Ken Griffin (Voorhees College)
Tamisha Augustin (Florida A&M)
Joe Silvestri (Central Florida)

Legend

- (C) Team captain
- (S) Suspended
- (I) Ineligible
- (W) Walk-on
- Injured
- Current redshirt

Roster
Last update: 2014-09-14

== Schedule and results ==
Date time, TV	Rank^{#}	Opponent^{#}	Result	Record	Site (attendance) city, state
Exhibition
11/07/2014*; 7:00 pm		Saint Leo	W 81–44	–	CFE Arena (N/A); Orlando, FL
Regular season
11/14/2014*; 11:00 am		Florida Atlantic	W 94–74	1–0	CFE Arena (288); Orlando, FL
11/17/2014*; 7:00 pm		Oakland	W 98–65	2–0	CFE Arena (979); Orlando, FL
11/19/2014*; 7:00 pm		Stetson	L 49–67	2–1	CFE Arena (1,137); Orlando, FL
11/25/2014*; 7:00 pm		Jacksonville	W 71–59	3–1	CFE Arena (1,238); Orlando, FL
11/30/2014*; 2:00 pm		at Massachusetts	L 62–67	3–2	Mullins Center (344); Amherst, MA
12/02/2014*; 4:30 pm		North Florida	W 60–56	4–2	CFE Arena (1,247); Orlando, FL
12/06/2014*; 6:00 pm		at FIU	L 57–66	4–3	FIU Arena (329); Miami, FL
12/11/2014*; 7:00 pm		at St. John's	L 48–62	4–4	Carnesecca Arena (603); Queens, NY
12/14/2014*; 2:00 pm		at Iona	L 67–75	4–5	Hynes Athletic Center (683); New Rochelle, NY
12/17/2014*; 4:30 pm		Akron	L 64–73	4–6	CFE Arena (1,028); Orlando, FL
12/20/2014*; 3:00 pm		at Middle Tennessee	L 57–79	4–7	Murphy Center (3,925); Murfreesboro, TN
12/27/2014; 3:00 pm, ADN		at Houston	W 64–50	5–7 (1–0)	Hofheinz Pavilion (499); Houston, TX
01/03/2015; 2:00 pm		Tulsa	W 76–70	6–7 (2–0)	CFE Arena (1,133); Orlando, FL
01/07/2015; 7:00 pm, ESPN3		Memphis	L 66–70	6–8 (2–1)	CFE Arena (1,040); Orlando, FL
01/10/2015; 2:00 pm		at Cincinnati	L 54–70	6–9 (2–2)	Fifth Third Arena (474); Cincinnati, OH
01/13/2015; 7:00 pm		Tulane	L 70–71	6–10 (2–3)	CFE Arena (1,121); Orlando, FL
01/17/2015; 2:00 pm		at Temple	L 57–72	6–11 (2–4)	McGonigle Hall (1,011); Philadelphia, PA
01/21/2015; 7:00 pm, SNY		No. 2 Connecticut	L 45–100	6–12 (2–5)	CFE Arena (2,975); Orlando, FL
01/25/2015; 2:00 pm, ESPNU		at SMU	W 61–57	7–12 (3–5)	Moody Coliseum (876); Dallas, TX
01/27/2015; 7:00 pm, ADN		Temple	L 54–71	7–13 (3–6)	CFE Arena (1,096); Orlando, FL
01/31/2015; 3:00 pm, ESPN3		at Tulsa	L 61–70	7–14 (3–7)	Reynolds Center (887); Tulsa, OK
02/03/2015; 7:00 pm, ADN		at South Florida; War on I-4	L 68–91	7–15 (3–8)	USF Sun Dome (2,003); Tampa, FL
02/07/2015; 2:00 pm		SMU	L 60–70	7–16 (3–9)	CFE Arena (2,693); Orlando, FL
02/10/2015; 8:00 pm, ADN		at Tulane	L 55–66	7–17 (3–10)	Devlin Fieldhouse (1,072); New Orleans, LA
02/14/2015; 2:00 pm, ADN		Cincinnati	W 66–51	8–17 (4–10)	CFE Arena (1,092); Orlando, FL
02/18/2015; 8:00 pm		at Memphis; Postponed from 2/17	L 49–65	8–18 (4–11)	Elma Roane Fieldhouse (511); Memphis, TN
02/24/2015; 7:00 pm, ESPN3		Houston	W 59–38	9–18 (5–11)	CFE Arena (1,183); Orlando, FL
02/28/2015; 4:00 pm, ESPN3		South Florida; War on I-4	L 71–99	9–19 (5–12)	CFE Arena (1,484); Orlando, FL
03/02/2015; 7:00 pm, ADN		at East Carolina	L 57–67	9–20 (5–13)	Williams Arena (1,213); Greenville, NC
2015 AAC Tournament
03/07/2015; 4:00 pm, ESPN3		vs. Cincinnati; Quarterfinals	L 66–76	9–21	Mohegan Sun Arena (N/A); Uncasville, CT
*Non-conference game. ^{#}Rankings from AP Poll. (#) Tournament seedings in parentheses. All times are in Eastern Time.

== See also ==
- 2014–15 UCF Knights men's basketball team
