= 2014–15 South Florida Bulls women's basketball team =

Intercollegiate basketball season

2014–15 South Florida Bulls women's basketball

NCAA Women's tournament, second round
- Conference: American Athletic Conference

Ranking
- Coaches: No. 25
- AP: No. 25
- Record: 27–8 (15–3 The American)
- Head coach: Jose Fernandez (15th season)
- Associate head coach: Jeff Osterman
- Assistant coaches: Michele Woods-Baxter; Desma Thomas Bateast
- Home arena: USF Sun Dome

2014–15 American Athletic Conference women's basketball standings
	Conf.				Overall
Team	W		L	PCT	W		L	PCT
No. 1 UConn †	18	–	0	1.000	38	–	1	.974
No. 25 South Florida	15	–	3	.833	27	–	8	.771
Tulsa	12	–	6	.667	18	–	14	.563
Temple	12	–	6	.667	20	–	17	.541
East Carolina	11	–	7	.611	22	–	11	.667
Tulane	11	–	7	.611	22	–	11	.667
Memphis	7	–	11	.389	14	–	17	.452
UCF	5	–	13	.278	9	–	21	.300
Cincinnati	4	–	14	.222	8	–	23	.258
SMU	3	–	15	.167	7	–	23	.233
Houston	1	–	17	.056	6	–	24	.200
† American Tournament winner winner As of 7 April 2015; Rankings from AP poll

The 2014–15 South Florida Bulls women's basketball team represented the University of South Florida in the 2014–15 NCAA Division I basketball season. The Bulls, coached by Jose Fernandez in his fifteenth season, played their home games at the USF Sun Dome in Tampa, Florida. This was USF's second season as a member of the American Athletic Conference, known as The American or AAC. The Bulls were picked in the preseason to place second in the AAC. They finished second in the conference and advanced all the way to the final of the 2015 American Athletic Conference women's basketball tournament. However, they fell 84–70 to UConn. South Florida fell to 0–17 all-time to the Huskies. They finished the season 27–8, 15–3 in AAC play to finish in second place. They received an at-large bid to the NCAA women's tournament, where they defeated LSU in the first round before losing to Louisville in the second round.

== Media ==
All Bulls games aired on Bullscast Radio or CBS 1010 AM. Conference home games rotated between ESPN3, AAC Digital, and Bullscast. Road games were typically streamed on the opponent's website, though some conference road games also appeared on ESPN3 or AAC Digital.

== Roster ==
2014–15 South Florida Bulls women's basketball team
Players
Coaches

Pos.	#	Name	Height	Year	Previous school	Hometown
F/C	1	Ivana Vuletic	6 ft 3 in (1.91 m)	Sr	Hagagymnasiet	Norrköping, Sweden
G	2	Micah Kroll	5 ft 8 in (1.73 m)	Jr	Tampa Catholic	Tampa, Florida
G	3	Tamara Taylor	5 ft 10 in (1.78 m)	Sr	Gulf Coast State College	St. Petersburg, Florida
G	4	Neena Pacholke	5 ft 7 in (1.7 m)	So	Freedom	Tampa, Florida
G	5	Tremaine McCullough	5 ft 8 in (1.73 m)	So	Edgewater	Orlando, Florida
G	10	Courtney Williams	5 ft 8 in (1.73 m)	Jr	Charlton County	Folkston, Georgia
G	11	Ariadna Pujol	6 ft 1 in (1.85 m)	So	GEM	Mataro, Spain
G	12	Bre Brooks	5 ft 6 in (1.68 m)	Jr	John Tyler	Tyler, Texas
F/C	14	Paige Cashin	6 ft 4 in (1.93 m)	So	Newark	Newark, Ohio
G	15	Shavontae Naylor	5 ft 9 in (1.75 m)	Jr	Southwest Atlanta Christian	Ocala, Florida
G	20	Laura Ferreira	5 ft 11 in (1.8 m)	Fr	None	Lisbon, Portugal
G	22	Laia Flores	5 ft 7 in (1.7 m)	Fr	Institut Municipal Biada	Mataro, Spain
G	23	Shalethia Stringfield	5 ft 6 in (1.68 m)	RS Jr	Potters House Christian Academy	Jacksonville, Florida
F	24	Alisia Jenkins	6 ft 1 in (1.85 m)	Jr	Statesboro	Statesboro, Georgia
G	31	Laura Marcos Canedo	5 ft 8 in (1.73 m)	So	Colegio Champagnat	Salamanca, Spain
G/F	32	Maria Jesperson	6 ft 0 in (1.83 m)	Fr	None	Hojbjerg, Denmark
F/C	45	Katelyn Weber	6 ft 5 in (1.96 m)	So	Hall	Little Rock, Arkansas

Head coach

- Jose Fernandez (Miami-Dade Kendall)

Assistant coach(es)

- Jeff Osterman (Siena)
- Michele Woods-Baxter (St. John Fisher College)
- Desma Thomas Bateast (Miami (FL))

Legend

- (C) Team captain
- (S) Suspended
- (I) Ineligible
- (W) Walk-on
- Injured
- Current redshirt

Roster
Last update: 2014-07-12

== Schedule ==
Date time, TV	Rank^{#}	Opponent^{#}	Result	Record	Site (attendance) city, state
Non-conference regular season
11/15/2014*; 4:00 pm		vs. Villanova; Chattanooga Invitational	W 57–56	1–0	McKenzie Arena (223); Chattanooga, TN
11/16/2014*; 2:00 pm		at Chattanooga; Chattanooga Invitational	W 59–57	2–0	McKenzie Arena (1,509); Chattanooga, TN
11/19/2014*; 7:00 pm		at No. 9 Maryland	L 67–85	2–1	Xfinity Center (3,165); College Park, MD
11/22/2014*; 2:00 pm		UNC Asheville	W 97–53	3–1	USF Sun Dome (1,515); Tampa, FL
11/27/2014*; 8:15 pm		vs. Oklahoma; Paradise Jam tournament	W 83–68	4–1	Sports and Fitness Center (1,978); Saint Thomas, USVI
11/28/2014*; 8:15 pm		vs. Illinois; Paradise Jam Tournament	W 67–61	5–1	Sports and Fitness Center (N/A); Saint Thomas, USVI
11/29/2014*; 8:15 pm		vs. No. 9 Kentucky; Paradise Jam Tournament	L 57–61	5–2	Sports and Fitness Center (2,347); Saint Thomas, USVI
12/03/2014*; 7:00 pm		Stetson	W 78–62	6–2	USF Sun Dome (1,475); Tampa, FL
12/07/2014*; 2:00 pm		St. John's	L 52–55	6–3	USF Sun Dome (1,648); Tampa, FL
12/14/2014*; 2:00 pm		College of Charleston	W 67–47	7–3	USF Sun Dome (1,296); Tampa, FL
12/17/2014*; 7:00 pm		Northern Colorado	W 84–43	8–3	USF Sun Dome (1,275); Tampa, FL
12/21/2014*; 2:00 pm		at Penn State	W 90–87 ^{OT}	9–3	Bryce Jordan Center (3,429); University Park, PA
AAC regular season
12/28/2014; 12:00 pm, ESPNU		East Carolina	W 69–62	10–3 (1–0)	USF Sun Dome (3,513); Tampa, FL
12/31/2014; 3:00 pm		Memphis	W 72–39	11–3 (2–0)	USF Sun Dome (1,350); Tampa, FL
01/04/2015; 5:30 pm, CBSSN		at Tulane	W 53–40	12–3 (3–0)	Devlin Fieldhouse (1,587); New Orleans, LA
01/11/2015; 12:00 pm, CBSSN		at Temple	W 70–58	13–3 (4–0)	McGonigle Hall (714); Philadelphia, PA
01/14/2015; 7:00 pm, ESPN3		SMU	W 82–59	14–3 (5–0)	USF Sun Dome (1,673); Tampa, FL
01/18/2015; 1:00 pm, ESPN2		at No. 2 Connecticut	L 50–92	14–4 (5–1)	Gampel Pavilion (9,030); Storrs, CT
01/21/2015; 8:00 pm, ADN		at Houston	W 71–55	15–4 (6–1)	Hofheinz Pavilion (305); Houston, TX
01/25/2015; 4:00 pm, CBSSN		Tulane	W 64–45	16–4 (7–1)	USF Sun Dome (1,488); Tampa, FL
01/31/2015; 3:00 pm, ESPN3		at Memphis	W 57–53	17–4 (8–1)	Elma Roane Fieldhouse (1,930); Memphis, TN
02/03/2015; 7:00 pm, ADN		UCF; War on I-4	W 91–68	18–4 (9–1)	USF Sun Dome (2,003); Tampa, FL
02/07/2015; 7:00 pm, ADN		Cincinnati	W 75–36	19–4 (10–1)	USF Sun Dome (1,628); Tampa, FL
02/10/2015; 8:00 pm, ADN	No. 25	at SMU	W 72–51	20–4 (11–1)	Moody Coliseum (494); Dallas, TX
02/15/2015; 2:00 pm, ESPNU	No. 25	at East Carolina	L 64–65	20–5 (11–2)	Williams Arena (1,646); Greenville, NC
02/18/2015; 7:00 pm, ADN		Tulsa	W 79–46	21–5 (12–2)	USF Sun Dome (1,640); Tampa, FL
02/22/2015; 12:00 pm, ESPNU		Temple	W 79–53	22–5 (13–2)	USF Sun Dome (1,940); Tampa, FL
02/24/2015; 7:00 pm		at Cincinnati	W 74–44	23–5 (14–2)	Fifth Third Arena (498); Cincinnati, OH
02/28/2015; 8:00 pm, ESPN3		at UCF; War on I-4	W 99–71	24–5 (15–2)	CFE Arena (1,484); Orlando, FL
03/02/2015; 7:00 pm, ESPN2		No. 1 Connecticut	L 65–88	24–6 (15–3)	USF Sun Dome (5,565); Tampa, FL
2015 AAC Tournament
03/07/2015; 6:00 pm, ESPN3		vs. Memphis; Quarterfinals	W 79–51	25–6	Mohegan Sun Arena (N/A); Uncasville, CT
03/08/2015; 7:30 pm, ESPNU		vs. Tulane; Semifinals	W 78–69	26–6	Mohegan Sun Arena (6,531); Uncasville, CT
03/09/2015; 7:00 pm, ESPN		vs. No. 1 Connecticut; Championship Game	L 70–84	26–7	Mohegan Sun Arena (6,499); Uncasville, CT
NCAA Women's tournament
03/21/2015*; 6:30 pm, ESPN2	No. 25	LSU; First Round	W 73–64	27–7	USF Sun Dome (5,560); Tampa, FL
03/23/2015*; 9:00 pm, ESPN2	No. 25	No. 8 Louisville; Second Round	L 52–60	27–8	USF Sun Dome (5,014); Tampa, FL
*Non-conference game. ^{#}Rankings from AP Poll. (#) Tournament seedings in parentheses. All times are in EST.

== Rankings ==
Ranking movement Legend: ██ Increase in ranking. ██ Decrease in ranking. NR = Not ranked. RV = Received votes.
Poll	Pre	Wk 2	Wk 3	Wk 4	Wk 5	Wk 6	Wk 7	Wk 8	Wk 9	Wk 10	Wk 11	Wk 12	Wk 13	Wk 14	Wk 15	Wk 16	Wk 17	Wk 18	Final
AP	RV	RV	RV	NR	RV	NR	NR	NR	RV	RV	RV	RV	RV	25	RV	RV	RV	RV	25
Coaches	RV	25	RV	RV	RV	RV	RV	RV	RV	25	RV	NR	RV	25	RV	RV	RV	RV	25

== See also ==
- 2014–15 South Florida Bulls men's basketball team
