= 2014–15 Temple Owls women's basketball team =

Intercollegiate basketball season

2014–15 Temple Owls women's basketball

WNIT, Semifinals
- Conference: American Athletic Conference
- Record: 20–17 (12–6 The American)
- Head coach: Tonya Cardoza (7th season)
- Assistant coaches: Way Veney (7th season); Meg Barber (3rd season); Willnett Crockett (6th season)
- Home arena: Liacouras Center; McGonigle Hall

2014–15 American Athletic Conference women's basketball standings
| | Conf. | | | | Overall |
| Team | W | | L | PCT | W | | L | PCT |
|---|---|---|---|---|---|---|---|---|
| No. 1 UConn † | 18 | – | 0 | 1.000 | 38 | – | 1 | .974 |
| No. 25 South Florida | 15 | – | 3 | .833 | 27 | – | 8 | .771 |
| Tulsa | 12 | – | 6 | .667 | 18 | – | 14 | .563 |
| Temple | 12 | – | 6 | .667 | 20 | – | 17 | .541 |
| East Carolina | 11 | – | 7 | .611 | 22 | – | 11 | .667 |
| Tulane | 11 | – | 7 | .611 | 22 | – | 11 | .667 |
| Memphis | 7 | – | 11 | .389 | 14 | – | 17 | .452 |
| UCF | 5 | – | 13 | .278 | 9 | – | 21 | .300 |
| Cincinnati | 4 | – | 14 | .222 | 8 | – | 23 | .258 |
| SMU | 3 | – | 15 | .167 | 7 | – | 23 | .233 |
| Houston | 1 | – | 17 | .056 | 6 | – | 24 | .200 |
† American Tournament winner winner As of 7 April 2015; Rankings from AP poll

The 2014–15 Temple Owls women's basketball team represented Temple University during the 2014–15 NCAA Division I women's basketball season. The season marks the second for the Owls as members of the American Athletic Conference. The team, coached by head coach Tonya Cardoza in her seventh season, played their home games at McGonigle Hall, with four games at the Liacouras Center.

They finished the season 20–17, 12–6 in AAC play to finish in a tie for third place. They lost in the quarterfinals of the American Athletic women's tournament to East Carolina. They were invited to the Women's National Invitation Tournament where they defeated Marist, Penn and NC State in the first, second and third rounds, Middle Tennessee in the quarterfinals before losing to West Virginia in the semifinals.

== Media ==
All Owls home games have video streaming on Owls TV, ESPN3, or AAC Digital. Road games are typically streamed on the opponent's website, though conference road games may also appear on ESPN3 or AAC Digital. There are no radio broadcasts for Owls women's basketball games. Audio of most games is also available through the opponent's website.

== Roster ==
2014–15 Temple Owls women's basketball team
Players
Coaches

| Pos. | # | Name | Height | Year | Previous school | Hometown |
|---|---|---|---|---|---|---|
| G | 0 | Alliya Butts | 5 ft 4 in (1.63 m) | Fr | Holy Cross | Edgewater Park, N.J. |
| G | 1 | Erica Covile | 6 ft 1 in (1.85 m) | Jr | John Glenn | Detroit, Mich. |
| G | 2 | Feyonda Fitzgerald | 5 ft 7 in (1.7 m) | So | Lake Taylor | Norfolk, Va. |
| F | 12 | Ruth Sherrill | 6 ft 0 in (1.83 m) | Jr | Thomas Edison | Alexandria, Va. |
| F | 13 | Mama Traore | 6 ft 1 in (1.85 m) | Jr | Lycee Notre Dame du Niger | Mali, Africa |
| G | 21 | Khadijah Berger | 5 ft 10 in (1.78 m) | Fr | Hampton | Hampton, Va. |
| G | 22 | Tanaya Atkinson | 5 ft 9 in (1.75 m) | Fr | Hill regional Career | New Haven, Conn. |
| G | 23 | Tyonna Williams | 5 ft 6 in (1.68 m) | Sr | Riverdale Baptist | Fort Washington, Md. |
| G | 32 | Donnaizha Fountain | 6 ft 0 in (1.83 m) | So | Cambridge Rindge & Latin | Roxbury, Mass. |
| F | 33 | Monasia Bolduc | 6 ft 1 in (1.85 m) | Jr | Cedar Ridge | Hillsborough, N.C. |
| C | 35 | Safiya Martin | 6 ft 4 in (1.93 m) | So | Sandy Creek | Fayetteville, Ga. |
| C | 42 | Taylor Robinson | 6 ft 4 in (1.93 m) | So | Ladue Horton Watkins | St. Louis, Mo. |

Head coach

Tonya Cardoza

Assistant coach(es)

Way Veney
Meg Barber
Willnett Crockett

Legend

- (C) Team captain
- (S) Suspended
- (I) Ineligible
- (W) Walk-on
- Injured
- Current redshirt

Roster
Last update: 2014-09-13

== Schedule and results ==
| Date time, TV | Rank^{#} | Opponent^{#} | Result | Record | Site (attendance) city, state |
Regular Season
| 11/14/2014*; 4:30 pm | | La Salle | W 75–72 | 1–0 | Liacouras Center (N/A); Philadelphia, PA |
| 11/18/2014*; 7:00 pm | | at Saint Joseph's | L 74–78 ^{OT} | 1–1 | Hagan Arena (1,351); Philadelphia, PA |
| 11/21/2014*; 9:30 pm | | vs. Georgetown; Hall of Fame Women's Challenge | W 81–58 | 2–1 | Allen Fieldhouse (N/A); Lawrence, KS |
| 11/22/2014*; 5:00 pm | | at Kansas; Hall of Fame Women's Challenge | L 56–76 | 2–2 | Allen Fieldhouse (2,132); Lawrence, KS |
| 11/23/2014*; 12:30 pm | | vs. Alabama; Hall of Fame Women's Challenge | L 51–58 | 2–3 | Allen Fieldhouse (N/A); Lawrence, KS |
| 11/30/2014*; 5:00 pm | | vs. Harvard; Hall of Fame Women's Challenge | W 81–69 | 3–3 | Mohegan Sun Arena (2,307); Uncasville, CT |
| 12/03/2014*; 7:00 pm | | Delaware | L 58–69 | 3–4 | Liacouras Center (565); Philadelphia, PA |
| 12/07/2014*; 2:00 pm | | Fordham | L 64–71 | 3–5 | McGonigle Hall (542); Philadelphia, PA |
| 12/10/2014*; 6:00 pm | | No. 17 Rutgers | L 55–88 | 3–6 | McGonigle Hall (867); Philadelphia, PA |
| 12/14/2014*; 2:00 pm | | Florida State | L 62–66 | 3–7 | McGonigle Hall (816); Philadelphia, PA |
| 12/18/2014*; 5:00 pm | | at Howard | W 78–48 | 4–7 | Burr Gymnasium (76); Washington, D.C. |
| 12/22/2014*; 11:30 am | | at Villanova | L 59–64 | 4–8 | The Pavilion (1,319); Villanova, PA |
| 12/28/2014; 8:30 pm, ESPNU | | at Memphis | W 58–57 | 5–8 (1–0) | Elma Roane Fieldhouse (1,278); Memphis, TN |
| 12/30/2014; 7:00 pm | | SMU | W 77–64 | 6–8 (2–0) | McGonigle Hall (903); Philadelphia, PA |
| 01/03/2015; 7:00 pm, ESPN3 | | at Cincinnati | W 81–64 | 7–8 (3–0) | Fifth Third Arena (460); Cincinnati, OH |
| 01/05/2015*; 7:00 pm | | at Penn | L 50–52 | 7–9 | Palestra (637); Philadelphia, PA |
| 01/11/2015; 12:00 pm, CBSSN | | South Florida | L 58–70 | 7–10 (3–1) | McGonigle Hall (714); Philadelphia, PA |
| 01/14/2015; 7:00 pm, SNY | | at No. 2 Connecticut | L 58–92 | 7–11 (3–2) | Gampel Pavilion (6,712); Storrs, CT |
| 01/17/2015; 2:00 pm | | UCF | W 72–57 | 8–11 (4–2) | McGonigle Hall (1,011); Philadelphia, PA |
| 01/20/2015; 7:00 pm, ESPN3 | | Cincinnati | W 83–50 | 9–11 (5–2) | McGonigle Hall (578); Philadelphia, PA |
| 01/27/2015; 7:00 pm, ADN | | at UCF | W 71–54 | 10–11 (6–2) | CFE Arena (1,096); Orlando, FL |
| 02/01/2015; 2:00 pm, ESPN2 | | No. 2 Connecticut | L 49–83 | 10–12 (6–3) | McGonigle Hall (2,646); Philadelphia, PA |
| 02/04/2015; 12:00 pm, ADN | | Memphis | W 84–61 | 11–12 (7–3) | Liacouras Center (2,814); Philadelphia, PA |
| 02/07/2015; 12:00 pm, ADN | | at Tulane | L 63–77 | 11–13 (7–4) | Devlin Fieldhouse (1,366); New Orleans, LA |
| 02/10/2015; 8:00 pm | | at Tulsa | L 67–75 | 11–14 (7–5) | Reynolds Center (860); Tulsa, OK |
| 02/14/2015; 5:00 pm, ADN | | Houston | W 72–60 | 12–14 (8–5) | Liacouras Center (8,121); Philadelphia, PA |
| 02/17/2015; 7:00 pm, ESPN3 | | Tulane | W 69–58 | 13–14 (9–5) | McGonigle Hall (651); Philadelphia, PA |
| 02/22/2015; 12:00 pm, ESPNU | | at South Florida | L 53–79 | 13–15 (9–6) | USF Sun Dome (1,940); Tampa, FL |
| 02/25/2015; 8:00 pm, ADN | | at SMU | W 55–39 | 14–15 (10–6) | Moody Coliseum (534); Dallas, TX |
| 02/28/2015; 2:00 pm, ESPN3 | | East Carolina | W 79–69 | 15–15 (11–6) | McGonigle Hall (1,196); Philadelphia, PA |
| 03/02/2015; 8:00 pm, ADN | | at Houston | W 56–45 | 16–15 (12–6) | Hofheinz Pavilion (283); Houston, TX |
2015 AAC Tournament
| 03/07/2015; 12:00 pm, ESPN3 | | vs. East Carolina; Quarterfinals | L 71–77 | 16–16 | Mohegan Sun Arena (N/A); Uncasville, CT |
WNIT
| 03/19/2015*; 7:00 pm | | at Marist; First Round | W 67–54 | 17–16 | McCann Field House (1,458); Poughkeepsie, NY |
| 03/22/2015*; 2:00 pm, ESPN3 | | at Penn; Second Round | W 61–56 | 18–16 | Palestra (890); Philadelphia, PA |
| 03/26/2015*; 7:00 pm | | NC State; Third Round | W 80–79 ^{OT} | 19–16 | McGonigle Hall (438); Philadelphia, PA |
| 03/29/2015*; 5:00 pm | | at Middle Tennessee; Quarterfinals | W 69–57 | 20–16 | Murphy Center (2,587); Murfreesboro, TN |
| 04/01/2015*; 7:00 pm | | at West Virginia; Semifinals | L 58–66 ^{OT} | 20–17 | WVU Coliseum (3,025); Morgantown, WV |
*Non-conference game. ^{#}Rankings from AP Poll. (#) Tournament seedings in parentheses. All times are in Eastern Time.

== See also ==
- 2014–15 Temple Owls men's basketball team
