= 2014–15 Cincinnati Bearcats women's basketball team =

Intercollegiate basketball season

2014–15 Cincinnati Bearcats women's basketball
- Conference: American Athletic Conference
- Record: 8–23 (4–14 The American)
- Head coach: Jamelle Elliott (6th season)
- Assistant coaches: Tasha McDowell (5th season); Katie Rokus (4th season); Aaron Swinson (4th season)
- Home arena: Fifth Third Arena

2014–15 American Athletic Conference women's basketball standings
	Conf.				Overall
Team	W		L	PCT	W		L	PCT
No. 1 UConn †	18	–	0	1.000	38	–	1	.974
No. 25 South Florida	15	–	3	.833	27	–	8	.771
Tulsa	12	–	6	.667	18	–	14	.563
Temple	12	–	6	.667	20	–	17	.541
East Carolina	11	–	7	.611	22	–	11	.667
Tulane	11	–	7	.611	22	–	11	.667
Memphis	7	–	11	.389	14	–	17	.452
UCF	5	–	13	.278	9	–	21	.300
Cincinnati	4	–	14	.222	8	–	23	.258
SMU	3	–	15	.167	7	–	23	.233
Houston	1	–	17	.056	6	–	24	.200
† American Tournament winner winner As of 7 April 2015; Rankings from AP poll

The 2014–15 Cincinnati Bearcats women's basketball team represented the University of Cincinnati during the 2014–15 NCAA Division I women's basketball season. The season marks the second for the Bearcats as members of the American Athletic Conference. The team, coached by head coach Jamelle Elliott in her sixth year, plays their home games at Fifth Third Arena. They finished the season 8–23, 4–14 in AAC play to finish in ninth place. They advanced to the quarter-finals of the Athletic Conference women's tournament where they lost to Connecticut.

== Media ==
All Bearscats games will have an audio broadcast streamed on Bearcats TV. Before conference season home games will also have a video stream on Bearcats TV. Conference home games will rotate between ESPN3, AAC Digital, Fox Sports Ohio, and Bearcats TV. Road games will typically be streamed on the opponents website, though conference road games could also appear on ESPN3 or AAC Digital.

== 2014–15 Roster ==
2014–15 Cincinnati Bearcats women's basketball team
Players
Coaches

Pos.	#	Name	Height	Year	Previous school	Hometown
G	3	Ana Owens	5 ft 6 in (1.68 m)	Fr	Lawrence North	Indianapolis, Ind.
G	5	Makenzie Cann	6 ft 0 in (1.83 m)	Fr	Anderson County	Lawrenceburg, Ky.
G	12	Alyesha Lovett	6 ft 0 in (1.83 m)	Sr	Malcolm X Shabazz	Newark, N.J.
G	13	Brandey Tarver	5 ft 10 in (1.78 m)	So	Bogan Computer Technical	Chicago, Ill.
F	14	Trinity Hunter	6 ft 1 in (1.85 m)	Fr	Gahanna Lincoln	New Albany, Ohio
F	21	Brianna Moore	6 ft 1 in (1.85 m)	Fr	Luella	Locust Grove, Ga.
G	22	Bianca Quisenberry	5 ft 8 in (1.73 m)	So	Tecumseh	Springfield, Ohio
G	23	Jasmine Whitfield	5 ft 10 in (1.78 m)	Jr	South Oldham	Crestwood, Ky.
G	25	Chelsea Jamison	5 ft 10 in (1.78 m)	Sr	Broad Ripple	Indianapolis, Ind.
F	32	Shelbi Chandler	6 ft 3 in (1.91 m)	Jr	Pike	Indianapolis, Ind.
F	35	Marley Hill	6 ft 2 in (1.88 m)	So	Columbus Africentric	Cleveland, Ohio
F	44	Ashley Nickens	6 ft 3 in (1.91 m)	So	Henry Ford II	Sterling Heights, Mich.

Head coach

Jamelle Elliott (Connecticut)

Assistant coach(es)

Tasha McDowell (St. Ambrose)
Katie Rokus (South Carolina-Aiken)
Aaron Swinson (Auburn)

Legend

- (C) Team captain
- (S) Suspended
- (I) Ineligible
- (W) Walk-on
- Injured
- Current redshirt

Roster
Last update: 2014-09-14

== Schedule and results ==
Date time, TV	Rank^{#}	Opponent^{#}	Result	Record	Site (attendance) city, state
Exhibition
11/07/2014*; 7:00 pm		Kentucky Wesleyan	W 60–38	–	Fifth Third Arena (N/A); Cincinnati, OH
Regular Season
11/15/2014*; 2:00 pm		Arkansas–Pine Bluff	W 73–57	1–0	Fifth Third Arena (542); Cincinnati, OH
11/19/2014*; 7:30 pm		at Tennessee–Martin	L 61–62	1–1	Tom and Kathleen Elam Center (1,671); Martin, TN
11/23/2014*; 2:00 pm		at Iowa State	L 54–85	1–2	Hilton Coliseum (6,836); Ames, IA
11/28/2014*; 10:30 pm		vs. Creighton; Cal Thanksgiving Classic semifinals	L 52–63	1–3	Haas Pavilion (2,309); Berkeley, CA
11/29/2014*; 8:00 pm		vs. San Jose State; Cal Thanksgiving Classic consolation round	L 54–79	1–4	Haas Pavilion (N/A); Berkeley, CA
12/02/2014*; 10:00 pm		at UCLA	L 58–66	1–5	Pauley Pavilion (507); Los Angeles, CA
12/07/2014*; 2:00 pm		at Bowling Green	L 55–66	1–6	Stroh Center (1,670); Bowling Green, OH
12/14/2014*; 2:00 pm		Xavier; Crosstown Classic	L 71–72	1–7	Fifth Third Arena (1,115); Cincinnati, OH
12/17/2014*; 7:00 pm		at Northern Kentucky	L 52–66	1–8	The Bank of Kentucky Center (1,253); Highland Heights, KY
12/20/2014*; 7:00 pm		Delaware	W 67–59	2–8	Fifth Third Arena (404); Cincinnati, OH
12/23/2014*; 12:00 pm		Detroit	W 70–38	3–8	Fifth Third Arena (433); Cincinnati, OH
12/28/2014; 2:00 pm		Tulane	L 50–60	3–9 (0–1)	Fifth Third Arena (531); Cincinnati, OH
12/31/2014; 3:00 pm, ADN		at Tulsa	L 52–74	3–10 (0–2)	Reynolds Center (817); Tulsa, OK
01/03/2015; 7:00 pm, ESPN3		Temple	L 64–81	3–11 (0–3)	Fifth Third Arena (460); Cincinnati, OH
01/07/2015; 8:00 pm		at Houston	W 76–73 ^{2OT}	4–11 (1–3)	Hofheinz Pavilion (378); Houston, TX
01/10/2015; 2:00 pm		UCF	W 70–54	5–11 (2–3)	Fifth Third Arena (474); Cincinnati, OH
01/14/2015; 8:00 pm, ESPN3		at Memphis	L 38–41	5–12 (2–4)	Elma Roane Fieldhouse (549); Memphis, TN
01/20/2015; 7:00 pm, ESPN3		at Temple	L 50–83	5–13 (2–5)	McGonigle Hall (548); Philadelphia, PA
01/25/2015; 3:00 pm, ESPN2		No. 2 Connecticut	L 31–96	5–14 (2–6)	Fifth Third Arena (1,579); Cincinnati, OH
01/28/2015; 7:00 pm, ADN		Memphis	L 44–56	5–15 (2–7)	Fifth Third Arena (414); Cincinnati, OH
01/31/2015; 2:00 pm, ADN		Houston	W 69–66 ^{OT}	6–15 (3–7)	Fifth Third Arena (750); Cincinnati, OH
02/03/2015; 3:00 pm, SNY		at No. 2 Connecticut	L 36–96	6–16 (3–8)	XL Center (8,190); Hartford, CT
02/07/2015; 7:00 pm, ADN		at South Florida	L 36–75	6–17 (3–9)	USF Sun Dome (1,628); Tampa, FL
02/10/2015; 7:00 pm		East Carolina	L 53–78	6–18 (3–10)	Fifth Third Arena (460); Cincinnati, OH
02/14/2015; 2:00 pm, ADN		at UCF	L 51–66	6–19 (3–11)	CFE Arena (1,092); Orlando, FL
02/21/2015; 1:30 pm, ESPN3		at East Carolina	L 40–53	6–20 (3–12)	Williams Arena at Minges Coliseum (1,204); Greenville, NC
02/24/2015; 7:00 pm		South Florida	L 44–74	6–21 (3–13)	Fifth Third Arena (498); Cincinnati, OH
02/28/2015; 3:00 pm, ADN		at SMU	W 56–46	7–21 (4–13)	Moody Coliseum (640); Dallas, TX
03/02/2015; 7:00 pm, ESPN3		Tulsa	L 58–71	7–22 (4–14)	Fifth Third Arena (518); Cincinnati, OH
2015 AAC Tournament
03/06/2015; 4:00 pm, ESPN3		vs. UCF; First Round	W 76–66	8–22	Mohegan Sun Arena (N/A); Uncasville, CT
03/07/2015; 2:00 pm, ESPN3		vs. No. 1 Connecticut; Quarterfinals	L 34–93	8–23	Mohegan Sun Arena (6,677); Uncasville, CT
*Non-conference game. ^{#}Rankings from AP Poll. (#) Tournament seedings in parentheses. All times are in EST.

== See also ==
- 2014–15 Cincinnati Bearcats men's basketball team
- Cincinnati Bearcats women's basketball
