= 2014–15 Tulsa Golden Hurricane women's basketball team =

Intercollegiate basketball season

2014–15 Tulsa Golden Hurricane women's basketball

WNIT, Second Round
- Conference: American Athletic Conference
- Record: 18–14 (12–6 The American)
- Head coach: Matilda Mossman (4th season)
- Assistant coaches: Shane Coffey (4th season); Megan Robbins (2nd season)
- Home arena: Reynolds Center

2014–15 American Athletic Conference women's basketball standings
| | Conf. | | | | Overall |
| Team | W | | L | PCT | W | | L | PCT |
|---|---|---|---|---|---|---|---|---|
| No. 1 UConn † | 18 | – | 0 | 1.000 | 38 | – | 1 | .974 |
| No. 25 South Florida | 15 | – | 3 | .833 | 27 | – | 8 | .771 |
| Tulsa | 12 | – | 6 | .667 | 18 | – | 14 | .563 |
| Temple | 12 | – | 6 | .667 | 20 | – | 17 | .541 |
| East Carolina | 11 | – | 7 | .611 | 22 | – | 11 | .667 |
| Tulane | 11 | – | 7 | .611 | 22 | – | 11 | .667 |
| Memphis | 7 | – | 11 | .389 | 14 | – | 17 | .452 |
| UCF | 5 | – | 13 | .278 | 9 | – | 21 | .300 |
| Cincinnati | 4 | – | 14 | .222 | 8 | – | 23 | .258 |
| SMU | 3 | – | 15 | .167 | 7 | – | 23 | .233 |
| Houston | 1 | – | 17 | .056 | 6 | – | 24 | .200 |
† American Tournament winner winner As of 7 April 2015; Rankings from AP poll

The 2014–15 Tulsa Golden Hurricane women's basketball team represented the University of Tulsa during the 2014–15 NCAA Division I women's basketball season. The season marked the first for the Golden Hurricane as members of the American Athletic Conference. The team, coached by head coach Matilda Mossman in her fourth year, played their home games at the Reynolds Center. They finished the season 18–14, 12–6 in AAC play to finish in a tie for third place. They lost in quarterfinals of the American Athletic women's tournament to Tulane. They were invited to the Women's National Invitation Tournament, where they defeated Missouri State in the first round before losing to Eastern Michigan in the second round.

== Media ==
All Golden Hurricane games will be broadcast on KTGX CHROME 95.3 FM and KWTU 88.7 FM HD3. The audio broadcast can also be heard on Hurricane Vision. A video stream for all home games will be on Hurricane Vision, ESPN3, or AAC Digital. Road games will typically be streamed on the opponents website, though conference road games could also appear on ESPN3 or AAC Digital.

== Roster ==
2014–15 Tulsa Golden Hurricane women's basketball team
Players
Coaches

| Pos. | # | Name | Height | Year | Previous school | Hometown |
|---|---|---|---|---|---|---|
| G | 0 | Kelsee Grovey | 5 ft 8 in (1.73 m) | Jr | Shawnee | Shawnee, Oklahoma |
| G | 1 | Jordyn Holmes | 5 ft 11 in (1.8 m) | Fr | Crockett | Austin, Texas |
| G | 3 | Erika Wakefield | 5 ft 4 in (1.63 m) | Fr | Heritage Hall | Moore, Oklahoma |
| G | 4 | Teanna Reid | 5 ft 6 in (1.68 m) | So | Butler CC | Oklahoma City, Oklahoma |
| C | 11 | Rickae Jinks | 6 ft 2 in (1.88 m) | So | Miramar | Miramar, Florida |
| G | 13 | Ashley Hughes | 5 ft 7 in (1.7 m) | So | Sulphur | Sulphur, Oklahoma |
| G | 15 | Antoinet Webster | 5 ft 9 in (1.75 m) | RS Jr | Western Heights | Oklahoma City, Oklahoma |
| F | 21 | Te'era Williams | 5 ft 11 in (1.8 m) | So | Butler CC | Oklahoma City, Oklahoma |
| G | 23 | Ashley Clark | 5 ft 11 in (1.8 m) | Jr | Midwest City | Midwest City, Oklahoma |
| C | 24 | Autura Campbell | 6 ft 2 in (1.88 m) | RS So | Topeka West | Topeka, Kansas |
| F | 25 | Liesl Spoerl | 6 ft 1 in (1.85 m) | So | Cascia Hall | Tulsa, Oklahoma |
| F | 32 | Mariah Turner | 6 ft 2 in (1.88 m) | Sr | Norman North | Norman, Oklahoma |
| G | 35 | Kadan Brady | 5 ft 9 in (1.75 m) | Sr | Healdton | Healdton, Oklahoma |
| G | 44 | Jasmine Vasquez | 5 ft 11 in (1.8 m) | Jr | Ryan | Denton, Texas |

Head coach

- Matilda Mossman (Western Kentucky)

Assistant coach(es)

- Shane Coffey (Oklahoma State)
- Megan Robbins (Oklahoma State)

Legend

- (C) Team captain
- (S) Suspended
- (I) Ineligible
- (W) Walk-on
- Injured
- Current redshirt

Roster
Last update: 2014-07-15

== Schedule and results ==
| Date time, TV | Rank^{#} | Opponent^{#} | Result | Record | Site (attendance) city, state |
Exhibition
| 11/01/2014*; 2:00 pm | | Rogers State | W 81–40 | – | Reynolds Center (1,028); Tulsa, OK |
| 11/01/2014*; 2:00 pm | | Southern Nazarene | W 102–61 | – | Reynolds Center (753); Tulsa, OK |
Regular Season
| 11/14/2014*; 7:00 pm | | Northern Iowa | L 66–69 | 0–1 | Reynolds Center (828); Tulsa, OK |
| 11/17/2014*; 6:00 pm | | Lamar | W 73–69 | 1–1 | Reynolds Center (896); Tulsa, OK |
| 11/21/2014*; 7:00 pm | | at Oral Roberts; Mayor's Cup | L 71–73 | 1–2 | Mabee Center (1,522); Tulsa, OK |
| 11/25/2014*; 2:30 pm | | at Texas Southern | W 67–64 ^{OT} | 2–2 | Health and Physical Education Arena (652); Houston, TX |
| 11/28/2014*; 2:00 pm | | vs. Buffalo; Miami Thanksgiving Tournament semifinals | W 87–77 | 3–2 | BankUnited Center (600); Coral Gables, FL |
| 11/29/2014*; 12:00 pm | | at Miami (FL); Miami Thanksgiving Tournament championship | L 57–69 | 3–3 | BankUnited Center (558); Coral Gables, FL |
| 12/03/2014*; 11:30 am | | Saint Louis | L 58–63 | 3–4 | Reynolds Center (997); Tulsa, OK |
| 12/06/2014*; 1:30 pm, ESPN3 | | at Valparaiso | W 87–63 | 4–4 | Athletics–Recreation Center (429); Valparaiso, IN |
| 12/14/2014*; 2:00 pm, CST | | Arkansas | L 53–64 | 4–5 | Reynolds Center (1,050); Tulsa, OK |
| 12/18/2014*; 7:00 pm | | New Orleans | W 78–55 | 5–5 | Reynolds Center (695); Tulsa, OK |
| 12/21/2014*; 7:00 pm | | Arkansas–Little Rock | L 59–66 | 5–6 | Reynolds Center (906); Tulsa, OK |
| 12/31/2014; 2:00 pm, ADN | | Cincinnati | W 74–52 | 6–6 (1–0) | Reynolds Center (817); Tulsa, OK |
| 01/03/2015; 3:00 pm | | at UCF | L 70–76 | 6–7 (1–1) | CFE Arena (1,133); Orlando, FL |
| 01/07/2015; 6:00 pm, SNY | | at No. 2 Connecticut | L 60–98 | 6–8 (1–2) | Gampel Pavilion (8,103); Storrs, CT |
| 01/10/2015; 2:00 pm, ADN | | Memphis | W 79–69 | 7–8 (2–2) | Reynolds Center (908); Tulsa, OK |
| 01/14/2015; 7:00 pm, ADN | | East Carolina | L 68–77 | 7–9 (2–3) | Reynolds Center (787); Tulsa, OK |
| 01/17/2015; 2:00 pm | | Houston | W 74–52 | 8–9 (3–3) | Reynolds Center (838); Tulsa, OK |
| 01/20/2015; 7:00 pm, ADN | | at Tulane | L 34–73 | 8–10 (3–4) | Devlin Fieldhouse (825); New Orleans, LA |
| 01/24/2015; 1:30 pm, ESPN3 | | at East Carolina | W 74–63 | 9–10 (4–4) | Williams Arena (1,417); Greenville, NC |
| 01/28/2015; 7:00 pm | | SMU | W 74–58 | 10–10 (5–4) | Reynolds Center (784); Tulsa, OK |
| 01/31/2015; 3:00 pm, ESPN3 | | UCF | W 70–61 | 11–10 (6–4) | Reynolds Center (887); Tulsa, OK |
| 02/07/2015; 2:00 pm, ESPN3 | | at Houston | W 67–51 | 12–10 (7–4) | Hofheinz Pavilion (335); Houston, TX |
| 02/10/2015; 7:00 pm | | Temple | W 75–67 | 13–10 (8–4) | Reynolds Center (860); Tulsa, OK |
| 02/14/2015; 2:00 pm, ESPN3 | | at SMU | W 72–59 | 14–10 (9–4) | Moody Coliseum (685); Dallas, TX |
| 02/18/2015; 6:00 pm, ADN | | at South Florida | L 46–79 | 14–11 (9–5) | USF Sun Dome (1,640); Tampa, FL |
| 02/21/2015; 2:00 pm, SNY | | No. 1 Connecticut | L 46–92 | 14–12 (9–6) | Reynolds Center (3,568); Tulsa, OK |
| 02/24/2015; 7:00 pm, ADN | | at Memphis | W 65–62 | 15–12 (10–6) | Elma Roane Fieldhouse (1,121); Memphis, TN |
| 02/28/2015; 2:00 pm | | Tulane | W 55–52 | 16–12 (11–6) | Reynolds Center (500); Tulsa, OK |
| 03/02/2015; 6:00 pm, ESPN3 | | at Cincinnati | W 71–58 | 17–12 (12–6) | Fifth Third Arena (518); Cincinnati, OH |
2015 AAC Tournament
| 03/07/2015; 7:00 pm, ESPN3 | | vs. Tulane; Quarterfinals | L 53–71 | 17–13 | Mohegan Sun Arena (5,177); Uncasville, CT |
WNIT
| 03/20/2015*; 7:00 pm | | at Missouri State; First Round | W 78–72 | 18–13 | JQH Arena (2,320); Springfield, MO |
| 03/22/2015*; 5:00 pm | | Eastern Michigan; Second Round | L 59–69 | 18–14 | Reynolds Center (324); Tulsa, OK |
*Non-conference game. ^{#}Rankings from AP Poll. (#) Tournament seedings in parentheses. All times are in Central Time.

== See also ==
- 2014–15 Tulsa Golden Hurricane men's basketball team
