= Melissa McFerrin =

American basketball player and coach

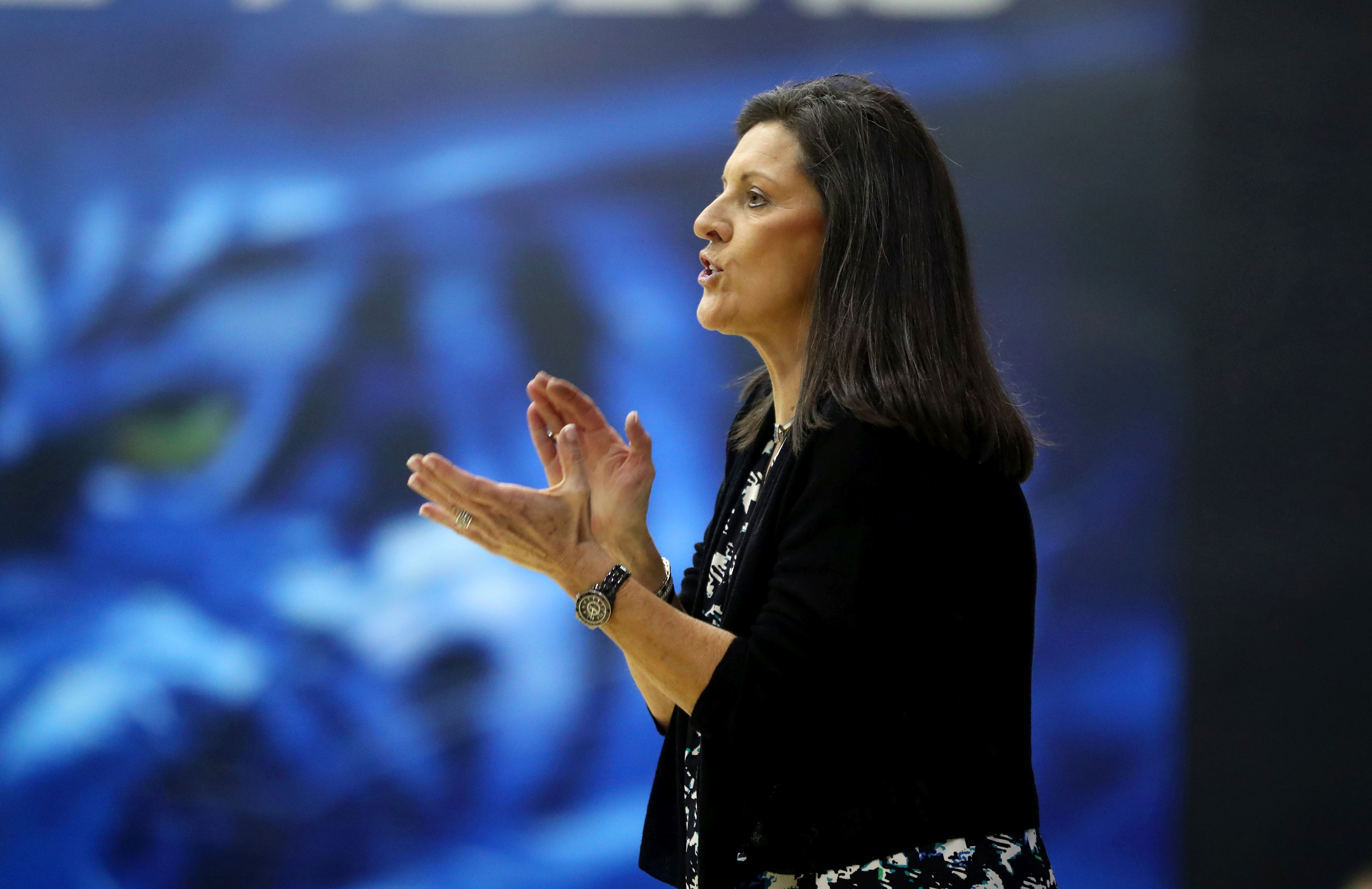

Biographical details
- Born: December 20, 1960 (age 65); Cassville, Missouri, U.S.

Playing career
- 1979–1983: Missouri

Coaching career (HC unless noted)
- 1983–1984: Wayland Baptist (grad asst.)
- 1984–1990: Central Michigan (asst.)
- 1990–1997: Ohio State (asst.)
- 1997–1999: New York Liberty (asst.)
- 1999–2000: Washington Mystics (asst.)
- 2002–2004: Minnesota (asst.)
- 2005–2008: American
- 2008–2021: Memphis

Head coaching record
- Overall: 243–269 (.475)

Accomplishments and honors

Championships
- Patriot League regular season (2008)

Awards
- Patriot League Coach of the Year (2008)

Melissa Lynne McFerrin (born December 20, 1960) is an American retired college basketball coach, having most recently served as head coach of the Memphis Tigers women's basketball team. McFerrin played point guard in college basketball at the University of Missouri from 1979 to 1983, reaching the Sweet 16 in 1982. She announced her retirement from coaching in February 2021.

== Early years ==
McFerrin grew up in Cassville, Missouri, and participated on the track team in high school, competing in the high jump where she placed first in class A in 1978.

== College ==
McFerrin attended the University of Missouri between 1979 and 1983, earning a letter in basketball each of her four years as the starting point guard for the Tigers. She help the team to the Big Eight title in 1983 and two NCAA tournament appearances in 1982 and 1983. In her senior year, she was honored as the Big Eight Scholar Athlete, graduating with a bachelor's degree in secondary education. In 1983 she earned all big eight honorable mention in 1983.

== Coaching ==
After college, she started her coaching career as a graduate assistant at Wayland Baptist. After a single season at Wayland Baptist, she spent six years as an assistant at Central Michigan. While at Central Michigan she earned a master's degree in physical education in 1988. McFerrin then moved on to Ohio State where she served as an assistant for seven years. During her time at Ohio State the team won the Big Ten in 1993, and finished as national runner-up in the NCAA tournament. She served as the recruiting coordinator during her tenure at Ohio State. The 1992 recruiting class was ranked as the number one recruiting class in the nation, in no small part to the fact that it included Katie Smith in the class.

In 1997, McFerrin moved to the professional ranks, joining the New York Liberty as an assistant coach. In her three years at the Liberty the team finished as runner-up twice, losing to Houston in the finals in 1997 and 1999. She then moved on to the Washington Mystics where she stayed for three years, two of which as the general manager. In her first season as general manager. the Mystics made the WNBA playoffs for the first time ever.

In 2002, McFerrin returned to the college coaching ranks, initially as an assistant coach for the University of Minnesota, and then as an associate head coach for the same team.

In 2004, McFerrin took on her first head coaching position accepting the position at American University. She remained at American for four seasons. In her final year at American, the American Eagle she finished first in the Patriot League and earned an invitation to the WNIT tournament. She was named Patriot League Coach of the year.

McFerrin became the head coach at the University of Memphis in 2008. After an initial losing season, the team put together four consecutive winning seasons and four consecutive postseason invitations, making the finals of the WBI in 2010 and earning invitations to the WNIT in the next three years. In 2013 Memphis became part of the American Athletic Conference. The team has one postseason appearance in the four years since joining the American conference, a WNIT invitation in 2016.

== Head coaching record ==
Record table
Season	Team	Overall	Conference	Standing	Postseason
American Eagles (Patriot League) (2004–2008)
2004–05	American	12–16	7–7	4th	
2005–06	American	7–21	4–10	7th	
2006–07	American	13–19	6–8	T-4th	
2007–08	American	18–14	11–3	1st	WNIT 1st Round
American:		50–70 (.417)	28–28 (.500)		
Memphis Tigers (Conference USA) (2008–2013)
2008–09	Memphis	12–18	5–11	T-9th	
2009–10	Memphis	20–14	10–6	T-2nd	WBI Finals
2010–11	Memphis	21–13	8–8	6th	WNIT 1st Round
2011–12	Memphis	25–8	13–3	2nd	WNIT 2nd Round
2012–13	Memphis	17–15	8–8	T-5th	WNIT 1st Round
Memphis Tigers (American Athletic Conference) (2013–2021)
2013–14	Memphis	13–18	6–12	7th	
2014–15	Memphis	14–17	7–11	7th	
2015–16	Memphis	18–13	12–6	4th	WNIT 1st Round
2016–17	Memphis	14–16	7–9	T-5th	
2017–18	Memphis	10–20	5–11	T-8th	
2018–19	Memphis	11–20	5–11	T-9th	
2019–20	Memphis	14–17	5–11	T-11th	
2020–21	Memphis	4–10	2–7		
Memphis:		193–199 (.492)	93–114 (.449)		
Total:		243–269 (.475)			
National champion Postseason invitational champion Conference regular season champion Conference regular season and conference tournament champion Division regular season champion Division regular season and conference tournament champion Conference tournament champion
