= 2014–15 Houston Cougars women's basketball team =

Intercollegiate basketball season

2014–15 Houston Cougars women's basketball
- Conference: American Athletic Conference
- Record: 6–24 (1–17 The American)
- Head coach: Ronald Hughey (1st season)
- Assistant coaches: Ravon Justice (5th season); Tai Dillard (1st season); Tonya Haut (1st season)
- Home arena: Hofheinz Pavilion

2014–15 American Athletic Conference women's basketball standings
| | Conf. | | | | Overall |
| Team | W | | L | PCT | W | | L | PCT |
|---|---|---|---|---|---|---|---|---|
| No. 1 UConn † | 18 | – | 0 | 1.000 | 38 | – | 1 | .974 |
| No. 25 South Florida | 15 | – | 3 | .833 | 27 | – | 8 | .771 |
| Tulsa | 12 | – | 6 | .667 | 18 | – | 14 | .563 |
| Temple | 12 | – | 6 | .667 | 20 | – | 17 | .541 |
| East Carolina | 11 | – | 7 | .611 | 22 | – | 11 | .667 |
| Tulane | 11 | – | 7 | .611 | 22 | – | 11 | .667 |
| Memphis | 7 | – | 11 | .389 | 14 | – | 17 | .452 |
| UCF | 5 | – | 13 | .278 | 9 | – | 21 | .300 |
| Cincinnati | 4 | – | 14 | .222 | 8 | – | 23 | .258 |
| SMU | 3 | – | 15 | .167 | 7 | – | 23 | .233 |
| Houston | 1 | – | 17 | .056 | 6 | – | 24 | .200 |
† American Tournament winner winner As of 7 April 2015; Rankings from AP poll

The 2014–15 Houston Cougars women's basketball team represented the University of Houston during the 2014–15 NCAA Division I women's basketball season. This was the Cougars' second season as members of the American Athletic Conference. The team, coached by new head coach Ronald Hughey, played their home games at Hofheinz Pavilion. They finished the season 6–24, 1–17 in conference play, to finish in last place. They lost in the first round of the American Athletic women's tournament to Tulane.

== Media ==
All Cougars games aired on the Houston Cougars IMG Sports Network, streamed online via the Houston Portal, with Jeremy Branham and Louis Ray on the call. Before conference season home games streamed on Houston All-Access. Conference home games rotated between ESPN3, AAC Digital, and the Houston Portal. Road games typically were streamed on the opponents' websites, though some conference road games also appeared on ESPN3 or AAC Digital.

== Roster ==
2014–15 Houston Cougars women's basketball team
Players
Coaches

| Pos. | # | Name | Height | Year | Previous school | Hometown |
|---|---|---|---|---|---|---|
| G | 0 | Alexia Sanders | 5 ft 8 in (1.73 m) | So | College Park | The Woodlands, Texas |
| G | 1 | Demetria Foreman | 5 ft 6 in (1.68 m) | Sr | MacArthur; Angelina JC | Irving, TX |
| G | 3 | Bianca Winlow | 5 ft 7 in (1.7 m) | Jr | Bellaire | Bellaire, TX |
| F | 10 | Sandra Davis | 6 ft 1 in (1.85 m) | Jr | Garden City Community College | Odenton, MD |
| G | 12 | Janee Arnold | 5 ft 6 in (1.68 m) | Fr | East Central | Tulsa, OK |
| G | 15 | Alecia Smith | 5 ft 7 in (1.7 m) | Jr | Cedar Hill | Cedar Hill, TX |
| G | 21 | Jessieka Palmer | 6 ft 1 in (1.85 m) | Jr | La Marque | La Marque, TX |
| F | 22 | Marche' Amerson | 6 ft 1 in (1.85 m) | Jr | Rudder | Bryan, TX |
| G | 23 | Moesha Kinard | 5 ft 8 in (1.73 m) | Fr | New Iberia | New Iberia, LA |
| G | 24 | Mariah Mitchell | 5 ft 9 in (1.75 m) | Fr | McKinney | McKinney, TX |
| F | 25 | DeJah Joshua | 5 ft 8 in (1.73 m) | Fr | West Side | Gary, IN |
| F | 33 | Tyler Gilbert | 6 ft 2 in (1.88 m) | Jr | Hightower | Missouri City, TX |
| F | 34 | Terran Alford | 6 ft 1 in (1.85 m) | Sr | Home Schooled | Oklahoma City, OK |
| F | 35 | Taylor Gilbert | 6 ft 2 in (1.88 m) | RS So | Hightower | Missouri City, TX |

Head coach

- Ronald Hughey (Limestone College)

Assistant coach(es)

- Ravon Justice (Houston Baptist)
- Tai Dillard (Texas)
- Tonya Haut (Baylor)/ (TCU)

Legend

- (C) Team captain
- (S) Suspended
- (I) Ineligible
- (W) Walk-on
- Injured
- Current redshirt

Roster
Last update: 2014-10-15

== Schedule and results ==
| Date time, TV | Rank^{#} | Opponent^{#} | Result | Record | Site (attendance) city, state |
Exhibition
| 11/09/2014*; 4:00 pm | | Huston–Tillotson | W 100–37 | – | Hofheinz Pavilion (N/A); Houston, TX |
Regular season
| 11/14/2014*; 7:00 pm | | at North Texas | W 46–42 | 1–0 | The Super Pit (1,442); Denton, TX |
| 11/17/2014*; 7:00 pm | | Incarnate Word | L 48–50 | 1–1 | Hofheinz Pavilion (526); Houston, TX |
| 11/21/2014*; 7:00 pm | | at Texas A&M–Corpus Christi | W 68–66 | 2–1 | Dugan Wellness Center (565); Corpus Christi, TX |
| 11/28/2014*; 4:00 pm | | vs. Idaho State; San Juan Shootout | L 67–73 | 2–2 | Mario Morales Coliseum (N/A); Guaynabo, PR |
| 11/29/2014*; 6:00 pm | | vs. James Madison; San Juan Shootout | L 60–84 | 2–3 | Mario Morales Coliseum (N/A); Guaynabo, PR |
| 12/03/2014*; 7:00 pm | | Rice; Bayou Cup | W 59–58 | 3–3 | Hofheinz Pavilion (286); Houston, TX |
| 12/07/2014*; 2:00 pm | | Prairie View A&M | L 56–61 | 3–4 | Hofheinz Pavilion (308); Houston, TX |
| 12/13/2014*; 2:00 pm | | at No. 4 Texas A&M | L 55–94 | 3–5 | Reed Arena (N/A); College Station, TX |
| 12/19/2014*; 3:00 pm | | vs. UTSA; Athletes in Action Tournament | W 56–53 | 4–5 | United Supermarkets Arena (3958); Lubbock, TX |
| 12/20/2014*; 12:00 pm | | vs. Nicholls State; Athletes in Action Tournament | W 65–47 | 5–5 | United Supermarkets Arena (N/A); Lubbock, TX |
| 12/21/2014*; 2:00 pm | | at Texas Tech; Athletes in Action Tournament | L 54–60 | 5–6 | United Supermarkets Arena (4,046); Lubbock, TX |
| 12/27/2014; 2:00 pm, ADN | | UCF | L 50–64 | 5–7 (0–1) | Hofheinz Pavilion (499); Houston, TX |
| 12/30/2014; 7:00 pm, ADN | | at Tulane | L 40–70 | 5–8 (0–2) | Devlin Fieldhouse (644); New Orleans, LA |
| 01/03/2015; 2:00 pm, ADN | | at SMU | W 63–45 | 6–8 (1–2) | Moody Coliseum (907); Dallas, TX |
| 01/07/2015; 7:00 pm | | Cincinnati | L 73–76 ^{2OT} | 6–9 (1–3) | Hofheinz Pavilion (378); Houston, TX |
| 01/10/2015; 1:00 pm | | East Carolina | L 46–87 | 6–10 (1–4) | Hofheinz Pavilion (355); Houston, TX |
| 01/17/2015; 2:00 pm | | at Tulsa | L 52–74 | 6–11 (1–5) | Reynolds Center (838); Tulsa, OK |
| 01/21/2015; 7:00 pm, ADN | | South Florida | L 55–71 | 6–12 (1–6) | Hofheinz Pavilion (305); Houston, TX |
| 01/24/2015; 2:00 pm, ADN | | at Memphis | L 49–84 | 6–13 (1–7) | Elma Roane Fieldhouse (1,327); Memphis, TN |
| 01/27/2015; 7:00 pm | | Tulane | L 46–63 | 6–14 (1–8) | Hofheinz Pavilion (340); Houston, TX |
| 01/31/2015; 1:00 pm, ADN | | at Cincinnati | L 66–69 ^{OT} | 6–15 (1–9) | Fifth Third Arena (750); Cincinnati, OH |
| 02/03/2015; 6:00 pm | | at East Carolina | L 56–79 | 6–16 (1–10) | Williams Arena (1,147); Greenville, NC |
| 02/07/2015; 2:00 pm, ESPN3 | | Tulsa | L 51–67 | 6–17 (1–11) | Hofheinz Pavilion (335); Houston, TX |
| 02/11/2015; 7:00 pm | | Memphis | L 58–64 | 6–18 (1–12) | Hofheinz Pavilion (463); Houston, TX |
| 02/14/2015; 2:00 pm, ADN | | at Temple | L 60–72 | 6–19 (1–13) | Liacouras Center (8,121); Philadelphia, PA |
| 02/17/2015; 6:00 pm, SNY | | at No. 1 Connecticut | L 26–85 | 6–20 (1–14) | XL Center (7,445); Hartford, CT |
| 02/21/2015; 2:00 pm, ADN | | SMU | L 51–68 | 6–21 (1–15) | Hofheinz Pavilion (915); Houston, TX |
| 02/24/2015; 6:00 pm, ESPN3 | | at UCF | L 38–59 | 6–22 (1–16) | CFE Arena (1,183); Orlando, FL |
| 03/02/2015; 7:00 pm, ADN | | Temple | L 45–56 | 6–23 (1–17) | Hofheinz Pavilion (283); Houston, TX |
2015 AAC Tournament
| 03/06/2015; 7:00 pm, ESPN3 | | vs. Tulane; First Round | L 39–61 | 6–24 | Mohegan Sun Arena (4,669); Uncasville, CT |
*Non-conference game. ^{#}Rankings from AP Poll. (#) Tournament seedings in parentheses. All times are in Central Time.

== See also ==
- 2014–15 Houston Cougars men's basketball team
