= Matilda Mossman =

American basketball coach (born 1956)

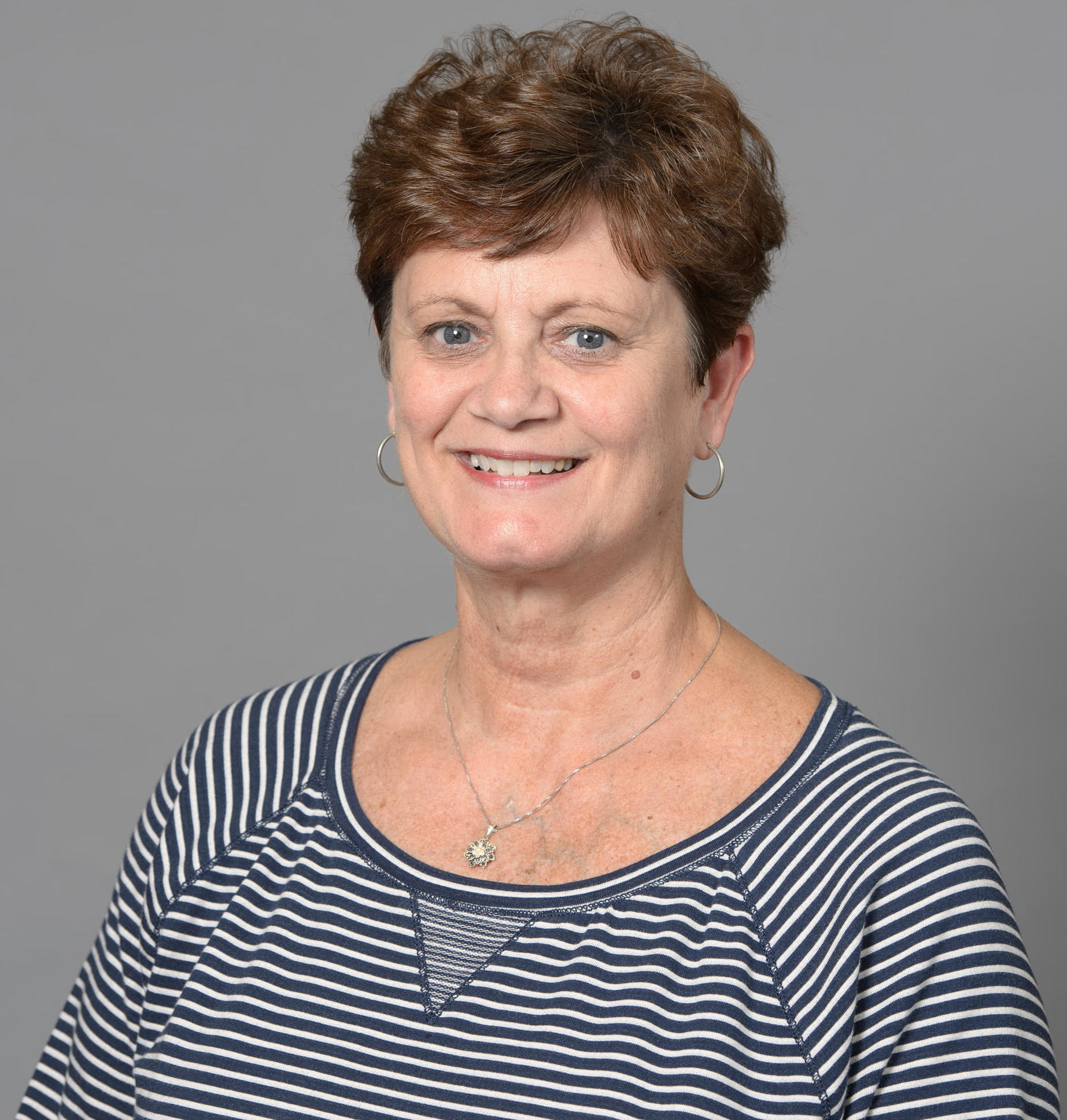

Biographical details
- Born: August 7, 1956 (age 70)
- Education: Western Kentucky

Coaching career (HC unless noted)
- 1979–1980: Western Kentucky (GA)
- 1980–1981: Arkansas (assistant)
- 1981–1984: Arkansas
- 1984–1990: Kansas State
- 1991–1994: Illinois State (assistant)
- 2002–2011: Norman HS Record 191-53, 2005 State Champions
- 2011–2021: Tulsa

Head coaching record
- Overall: 266–269 (.497)

Matilda Mossman (née Willis; born August 7, 1956) is an American college basketball coach and the former head coach of the Tulsa women's basketball team.

== Head coaching record ==
Record table
| Season | Team | Overall | Conference | Standing | Postseason |
|---|---|---|---|---|---|
Arkansas Razorbacks (Southwest Conference) (1981–1984)
| 1981–82 | Arkansas | 26–10 | | | |
| 1982–83 | Arkansas | 21–8 | | | |
| 1983–84 | Arkansas | 20–9 | | | |
| Arkansas: | | 67–27 (.713) | | | |
Kansas State Wildcats (Big Eight Conference) (1984–1990)
| 1984–85 | Kansas State | 16–13 | | | |
| 1985–86 | Kansas State | 16–13 | | | |
| 1986–87 | Kansas State | 22–9 | | | NCAA Tournament, Coach of the Year |
| 1987–88 | Kansas State | 8–20 | | | |
| 1988–89 | Kansas State | 18–11 | | | |
| 1989–90 | Kansas State | 3–2 | | | |
| Kansas State: | | 83–68 (.550) | | | |
Tulsa Golden Hurricane (Conference USA) (2011–2014)
| 2011–12 | Tulsa | 13–15 | 8–8 | 6th | |
| 2012–13 | Tulsa | 17–17 | 8–8 | 6th | NCAA 1st round |
| 2013–14 | Tulsa | 12–16 | 6–10 | 10th | |
Tulsa Golden Hurricane (American Athletic Conference) (2014–2021)
| 2014–15 | Tulsa | 18–14 | 12–6 | 3rd | WNIT Second Round |
| 2015–16 | Tulsa | 12–19 | 8–10 | 6th | |
| 2016–17 | Tulsa | 10–21 | 5–11 | 9th | |
| 2017–18 | Tulsa | 10–21 | 3–13 | T-11th | |
| 2018–19 | Tulsa | 13–18 | 6–10 | T-7th | |
| 2019–20 | Tulsa | 9–21 | 4–12 | T-11th | |
| 2020–21 | Tulsa | 5–14 | 4–13 | 8th | |
| Tulsa: | | 119–176 (.403) | 68–101 (.402) | | |
| Total: | | 269–271 (.498) | | | |
National champion Postseason invitational champion Conference regular season champion Conference regular season and conference tournament champion Division regular season champion Division regular season and conference tournament champion Conference tournament champion
