= 2014–15 Texas A&M Aggies women's basketball team =

Intercollegiate basketball season

2014–15 Texas A&M Aggies women's basketball

Maggie Dixon Classic champions

NCAA tournament, first round
- Conference: Southeastern Conference

Ranking
- Coaches: No. 20
- AP: No. 21
- Record: 23–10 (10–6 SEC)
- Head coach: Gary Blair (12th season)
- Assistant coaches: Kelly Bond-White (12th season); Bob Starkey (3rd season); Amy Wright (3rd season)
- Home arena: Reed Arena

2014–15 SEC women's basketball standings
	Conf.				Overall
Team	W		L	PCT	W		L	PCT
No. 3 South Carolina*^{†}	15	–	1	.938	34	–	3	.919
No. 6 Tennessee	15	–	1	.938	30	–	6	.833
No. 12 Mississippi State	11	–	5	.688	27	–	7	.794
No. 11 Kentucky	10	–	6	.625	24	–	10	.706
No. 21 Texas A&M	10	–	6	.625	23	–	10	.697
LSU	10	–	6	.625	17	–	14	.548
Missouri	7	–	9	.438	19	–	14	.576
Ole Miss	7	–	9	.438	19	–	14	.576
Georgia	6	–	10	.375	19	–	12	.613
Arkansas	6	–	10	.375	18	–	14	.563
Vanderbilt	5	–	11	.313	15	–	16	.484
Florida	5	–	11	.313	13	–	17	.433
Auburn	3	–	13	.188	13	–	18	.419
Alabama	2	–	14	.125	13	–	19	.406
† 2015 SEC tournament winner Rankings from AP poll

The 2014–15 Texas A&M Aggies women's basketball team represented Texas A&M University in the 2014–15 college basketball season. The team's head coach was Gary Blair, who was in his twelfth season at Texas A&M. The team played their home games at the Reed Arena in College Station, Texas, and played in its third season as a member of the Southeastern Conference. They finished the season 23–10, 10–6 in SEC play to finish in a three-way tie for fourth place. They lost in the quarterfinals of the SEC women's tournament to LSU. They received an automatic bid to the NCAA women's tournament, where they lost to Arkansas–Little Rock in the first round.

== Roster ==
2014–15 Texas A&M Aggies women's basketball team
Players
Coaches

Pos.	#	Name	Height	Year	Previous school	Hometown
C	00	Khaalia Hillsman	6 ft 5 in (1.96 m)	Fr	Whitney Young	Chicago, IL
G/F	1	Courtney Williams	6 ft 1 in (1.85 m)	Jr	North Shore	Houston, TX
F	3	Taylor Cooper	6 ft 0 in (1.83 m)	RS So	Oral Roberts; Shawnee	Shawnee, OK
G	10	Shlonte Allen	5 ft 8 in (1.73 m)	Jr	Trinity Valley CC; Arcada	Arcadia, LA
G	11	Curtyce Knox	5 ft 7 in (1.7 m)	RS So	Atascocita	Humble, TX
C	12	Jada Terry	6 ft 3 in (1.91 m)	So	Cedar Hill	Cedar Hill, TX
G	13	Chelsea Jennings	5 ft 9 in (1.75 m)	Jr	North Crowley	Ft. Worth, TX
G	15	Tori Scott	5 ft 10 in (1.78 m)	Sr	John Ehret	Marrero, LA
C	23	Rachel Mitchell	6 ft 7 in (2.01 m)	Jr	Atascocita	Houston, TX
G	24	Jordan Jones	5 ft 6 in (1.68 m)	Jr	DeSoto	DeSoto, TX
G	30	Allison Chu	5 ft 5 in (1.65 m)	Jr	Plano	Plano, TX
F	32	Tavarsha Scott-Williams	6 ft 0 in (1.83 m)	Sr	Northwest Florida State College; Ringgold	Ringgold, LA
G	33	Courtney Walker	5 ft 8 in (1.73 m)	So	Santa Fe	Edmond, OK
F	35	Achiri Ade	6 ft 1 in (1.85 m)	Sr	Midland JC; Seton Keough	Baltimore, MD

Head coach

- Gary Blair (Texas Tech)

Assistant coach(es)

- Kelly Bond-White (Illinois)
- Bob Starkey
- Amy Wright (Arkansas)

Legend

- (C) Team captain
- (S) Suspended
- (I) Ineligible
- (W) Walk-on
- Injured
- Current redshirt

Roster
Last update: 2014-10-09

== Schedule and results ==
Date time, TV	Rank^{#}	Opponent^{#}	Result	Record	Site (attendance) city, state
Exhibition
Nov 8, 2014*; 7:00 p.m.	No. 5	Oklahoma City	W 74–51	–	Reed Arena (4,015); College Station, TX
Non-conference games
Nov 14, 2014*; 6:30 p.m.	No. 5	at No. 18 DePaul; Maggie Dixon Classic	W 76–68	1–0	Sullivan Athletic Center (N/A); Chicago, IL
Nov 15, 2014*; 4:00 p.m.	No. 5	vs. New Mexico; Maggie Dixon Classic	W 66–52	2–0	Sullivan Athletic Center (N/A); Chicago, IL
Nov 16, 2014*; 2:00 p.m.	No. 5	vs. Texas–Pan American; Maggie Dixon Classic	W 63–61	3–0	Sullivan Athletic Center (N/A); Chicago, IL
Nov 19, 2014*; 7:00 p.m.	No. 5	Rice	W 76–55	4–0	Reed Arena (3,592); College Station, TX
Nov 24, 2014*; 7:00 p.m.	No. 7	Prairie View A&M	W 59–41	5–0	Reed Arena (3,523); College Station, TX
Nov 26, 2014*; 7:00 p.m.	No. 7	McNeese State	W 93–27	6–0	Reed Arena (4,073); College Station, TX
Nov 30, 2014*; 7:00 p.m., SECN	No. 7	No. 8 Duke	W 63–59	7–0	Reed Arena (6,123); College Station, TX
Dec 3, 2014*; 11:00 a.m.	No. 5	Northwestern State	W 75–42	8–0	Reed Arena (7,712); College Station, TX
Dec 7, 2014*; 1:00 p.m., FSN	No. 5	at TCU	W 82–71	9–0	Student Recreation Center (1,350); Fort Worth, TX
Dec 9, 2014*; 7:00 p.m.	No. 4	at SMU	W 70–62	10–0	Moody Coliseum (1,155); Dallas, TX
Dec 13, 2014*; 1:30 p.m.	No. 4	Houston	W 94–55	11–0	Reed Arena (N/A); College Station, TX
Dec 21, 2014*; 12:30 p.m., SECN	No. 4	vs. No. 3 Texas; Big 12/SEC Women's Challenge	L 65–67	11–1	Verizon Arena (2,544); North Little Rock, AR
Dec 29, 2014*; 8:00 p.m., P12N	No. 5	at Washington	L 49–70	11–2	Alaska Airlines Arena (2,669); Seattle, WA
Dec 31, 2014*; 4:00 p.m.	No. 5	North Texas	W 75–38	12–2	Reed Arena (4,015); College Station, TX
Conference games
Jan 2, 2015; 7:00 p.m.	No. 5	Vanderbilt	W 75–61	13–2 (1–0)	Reed Arena (4,513); College Station, TX
Jan 4, 2015; 12:30 p.m., ESPNU	No. 5	at Arkansas	W 52–50	14–2 (2–0)	Bud Walton Arena (2,106); Fayetteville, AR
Jan 8, 2015; 6:00 p.m., SECN	No. 9	at No. 7 Tennessee	L 58–81	14–3 (2–1)	Thompson–Boling Arena (10,507); Knoxville, TN
Jan 11, 2015; 6:00 p.m., ESPNU	No. 9	LSU	W 55–48	15–3 (3–1)	Reed Arena (4,763); College Station, TX
Jan 18, 2015; 4:00 p.m., SECN	No. 11	Ole Miss	W 58–49	16–3 (4–1)	Reed Arena (4,732); College Station, TX
Jan 22, 2015; 6:00 p.m.	No. 10	at No. 22 Georgia	L 51–54	16–4 (4–2)	Stegeman Coliseum (2,946); Athens, GA
Jan 26, 2015; 6:00 p.m., ESPN2	No. 12	at No. 1 South Carolina	L 61–79	16–5 (4–3)	Colonial Life Arena (13,546); Columbia, SC
Feb 1, 2015; 6:00 p.m.	No. 12	Auburn	W 78–45	17–5 (5–3)	Reed Arena (4,086); College Station, TX
Feb 5, 2015; 8:00 p.m., SECN	No. 14	at Missouri	W 55–48	18–5 (6–3)	Mizzou Arena (N/A); Columbia, MO
Feb 8, 2015; 2:00 p.m., SECN	No. 14	at No. 17 Mississippi State	L 61–63 ^{OT}	18–6 (6–4)	Humphrey Coliseum (4,651); Starkville, MS
Feb 12, 2015; 8:00 p.m., SECN	No. 15	Arkansas	W 59–55	19–6 (7–4)	Reed Arena (4,443); College Station, TX
Feb 16, 2015; 6:00 p.m., SECN	No. 15	Alabama	W 70–49	20–6 (8–4)	Reed Arena (4,507); College Station, TX
Feb 19, 2015; 6:00 p.m.	No. 15	at No. 11 Kentucky	W 81–69	21–6 (9–4)	Memorial Coliseum (5,516); Lexington, KY
Feb 22, 2015; 3:00 p.m., SECN	No. 15	Florida	W 66–46	22–6 (10–4)	Reed Arena (5,631); College Station, TX
Feb 26, 2015; 7:00 p.m.	No. 12	Missouri	L 69–70	22–7 (10–5)	Reed Arena (6,733); College Station, TX
Mar 1, 2015; 1:00 p.m., ESPNU	No. 12	at LSU	L 63–80	22–8 (10–6)	Maravich Center (3,463); Baton Rouge, LA
2015 SEC Tournament
Mar 5, 2015; 2:30 p.m., SECN	No. 18	vs. Auburn; Second Round	W 57–47	23–8	Verizon Arena (N/A); North Little Rock, AR
Mar 6, 2015; 2:30 p.m., SECN	No. 18	vs. LSU; Quarterfinals	L 65–71	23–9	Verizon Arena (4,630); North Little Rock, AR
NCAA Women's Tournament
Mar 21, 2015*; 3:00 p.m., ESPN2	No. 21	vs. Arkansas–Little Rock; First Round	L 60–69	23–10	Wells Fargo Arena (N/A); Tempe, AZ
*Non-conference game. ^{#}Rankings from AP Poll. (#) Tournament seedings in parentheses. All times are in Central Time.

== See also ==
- 2014–15 NCAA Division I women's basketball season
- 2014–15 NCAA Division I women's basketball rankings
- 2014–15 Texas A&M Aggies men's basketball team

== Rankings ==
Ranking movement Legend: ██ Increase in ranking. ██ Decrease in ranking. NR = Not ranked. RV = Received votes.
Poll	Pre	Wk 2	Wk 3	Wk 4	Wk 5	Wk 6	Wk 7	Wk 8	Wk 9	Wk 10	Wk 11	Wk 12	Wk 13	Wk 14	Wk 15	Wk 16	Wk 17	Wk 18	Final
AP	5	5	7	5	4	4	5	5	9	11	10	12	14	15	15	12	18	21	21
Coaches	5	6	6	5	5	5	5	8	8	12	10	14	13	16	15	12	17	19т	20
