= 2015 American Athletic Conference women's basketball tournament =

- Tournament Logo
- Classification: Division I
- Season: 2014–15
- Teams: 11
- Site: Mohegan Sun Arena; Uncasville, Connecticut
- Champions: Connecticut (2nd title)
- Winning coach: Geno Auriemma (2nd title)
- MVP: Kaleena Mosqueda-Lewis (Connecticut)
- Attendance: 29,553
- Television: ESPN, ESPNU, ESPN3

2014–15 American Athletic Conference women's basketball standings
	Conf.				Overall
Team	W		L	PCT	W		L	PCT
No. 1 UConn †	18	–	0	1.000	38	–	1	.974
No. 25 South Florida	15	–	3	.833	27	–	8	.771
Tulsa	12	–	6	.667	18	–	14	.563
Temple	12	–	6	.667	20	–	17	.541
East Carolina	11	–	7	.611	22	–	11	.667
Tulane	11	–	7	.611	22	–	11	.667
Memphis	7	–	11	.389	14	–	17	.452
UCF	5	–	13	.278	9	–	21	.300
Cincinnati	4	–	14	.222	8	–	23	.258
SMU	3	–	15	.167	7	–	23	.233
Houston	1	–	17	.056	6	–	24	.200
† American Tournament winner winner As of 7 April 2015; Rankings from AP poll

The 2015 American Athletic Conference women's basketball tournament was an postseason women's tournament was held March 6–9, 2015, in the Mohegan Sun Arena in Uncasville, Connecticut and will decide the champion of the 2014–15 American Athletic Conference women's basketball season. The teams in the conference will compete in an eleven team single elimination tournament with the addition of Tulsa and Tulane for an automatic bid to the 2015 NCAA tournament. UConn beat South Florida in the final 84–70 to win its second straight AAC tournament championship.

== Seeds ==
All the teams in the American Athletic Conference will qualify for the tournament. Teams are seeded based on conference record and then a tie breaker system is used. Teams seeded 6-11 will have to play in the opening round and teams seeded 1-5 receive a bye to the quarterfinals.

Seed	School	Conf (Overall)	Tiebreaker
1	Connecticut	18–0 (29–1)	
2	South Florida	15–3 (24–6)	
3	Tulsa	12–6 (17–12)	1–0 vs. Temple
4	Temple	12–6 (15–14)	0–1 vs. Tulsa
5	East Carolina	11–7 (20–9)	1–1 vs. South Florida
6	Tulane	11–7 (20–9)	0–2 vs. South Florida
7	Memphis	7–11 (13–16)	
8	UCF	5–13 (9–20)	
9	Cincinnati	4–14 (7–22)	
10	SMU	3–15 (7–22)	
11	Houston	1–17 (6–22)	
‡ – American Athletic Conference regular season champions. # – Received a first-round bye in the conference tournament. Overall record are as of the end of the regular season.

== Schedule ==
All tournament games are nationally televised on an ESPN network:

Session	Game	Time*	Matchup^{#}	Television	Attendance
First round – Friday, March 6
1	1	4:00 PM	#8 UCF vs. #9 Cincinnati	ESPN3	4,669
1	2	6:00 PM	#7 Memphis vs. #10 SMU	ESPN3	4,669
1	3	8:00 PM	#6 Tulane vs. #11 Houston	ESPN3	4,669
Quarterfinals – Saturday, March 7
2	4	12:00 PM	#4 Temple vs. #5 East Carolina	ESPN3	6,677
2	5	2:00 PM	#1 Connecticut vs. #9 Cincinnati	ESPN3	6,677
3	6	6:00 PM	#2 South Florida vs. #7 Memphis	ESPN3	5,177
3	7	8:00 PM	#3 Tulsa vs. #6 Tulane	ESPN3	5,177
Semifinals – Sunday, March 8
4	8	5:30 PM	#5 East Carolina vs. #1 Connecticut	ESPNU	6,531
4	9	7:30 PM	#2 South Florida vs. #6 Tulane	ESPNU	6,531
Championship Game – Monday, March 9
5	10	7:00 PM	#1 Connecticut vs. #2 South Florida	ESPN	6,499
*Game Times in EST. #-Rankings denote tournament seeding.

== Bracket ==
The tournament took place March 6–9.

First round Friday, March 6
8	UCF	66
9	Cincinnati	76
7	Memphis	71
10	SMU	59
6	Tulane	64
11	Houston	39

Quarterfinals; Saturday, March 7
1	Connecticut	93
9	Cincinnati	34
4	Temple	71
5	East Carolina	77
2	South Florida	79
7	Memphis	51
3	Tulsa	53
6	Tulane	71

Semifinals; Sunday, March 8
1	Connecticut	106
5	East Carolina	56
2	South Florida	78
6	Tulane	69

Championship game Monday, March 9
1	Connecticut	84
2	South Florida	70
