= Beth Dunkenberger =

Beth Dunkenberger is a basketball coach with the University of Miami. Previously she has had coaching roles at Virginia Tech, Western Carolina University, the University of Florida, and the Tulane Green Wave.

== Background ==
Dunkenberger was born in Roanoke, Virginia, and is the daughter of Tom and Rebecca Dunkenberger. She attended Shawsville High School and played college basketball at Randolph-Macon College from which she graduated with a Bachelor of Science degree in mathematics in 1988. In 1990, she completed her master's degree in education from Virginia Tech.

== Coaching career ==
=== Virginia Tech: 1988–1997 ===
Dunkenberger started her career at Virginia Tech as a graduate assistant with the Hokies for two years before being appointed full-time as assistant coach in 1990. During this time, the Hokies won the Metro Conference Tournament (1994) and the Metro regular season title (1995), advancing to the first (1994) and second round (1995) of the NCAA tournament.

=== University of Florida: 1997–2000 ===
Between 1997 and 2000, Dunkenberger was an assistant coach at the University of Florida during which time the Gators earned a combined 73–36 record. The Gators reached NCAA Sweet 16 in 1997–98 and to the final of the WNIT in 2000.

=== Western Carolina University: 2000–2004 ===
In 2000, Dunkenberger was appointed to her first head coaching role at Western Carolina University where, over a period of four seasons, the Catamounts posted 65 victories. Dunkenberger became the first woman to be named Southern Conference Coach of the Year as the Catamounts finished the 2002–03 season with a 21–7 record, and advanced to the finals of the SoCon Championship.

=== Virginia Tech: 2004–2011 ===
On April 6, 2004, she was named the fifth head women's basketball coach at Virginia Tech. In 2005, she led the team to the NCAA Tournament and the 2007 team made it to the third round of the WNIT.

=== Tulane University: 2011–2020 ===
Dunkenberger was the director of operations with the Tulane Green Wave during the 2011–12 season. In 2012, she was appointed as an assistant coach. She stepped down from this role in 2020.

=== University of Miami: 2021–present ===
Dunkenberger was hired as an assistant coach for the Miami Hurricanes' women's basketball team in May 2021.
