= Memphis Tigers women's basketball =

2026–27 Memphis Tigers women's basketball team
- University: University of Memphis
- First season: 1914
- Head coach: Hana Haden (1st season)
- Location: Memphis, Tennessee
- Arena: Elma Roane Fieldhouse (capacity: 2,565)
- Conference: The American
- Nickname: Tigers
- Colors: Blue and gray
- Student section: Blue Crew
- All-time record: 680–503 (.575)

NCAA Division I tournament Sweet Sixteen
- 1982

NCAA Division I tournament appearances
- 1982, 1985, 1987, 1995, 1996, 1997, 1998

Conference tournament champions
- Metro Conference; 1982, 1985 Conference USA; 1996, 1998

Uniforms
Home	Away

The Memphis Tigers women's basketball team represents the University of Memphis in NCAA Division I women's college basketball. The Tigers have competed in the American Conference since 2013. They previously competed in Conference USA in which they have won two Conference USA conference tournament championships and, prior to that two Metro Conference tournament championships. They play home games at the Elma Roane Fieldhouse and FedExForum.

== History ==
The first inter-school game of the Memphis Tigers (then West Tennessee State Normal School) was a 24–0 win over Whitehaven High School in 1914. The university dropped women's athletics in 1936 and did not return women's athletics to varsity sport status until the 1972–73 season.

The team has competed in the NCAA tournament seven times., the WNIT five times, the National Women's Invitational tournament one time and the Women's Basketball Invitational one time.

Jamirah Shutes, a senior guard on the 2022–23 Memphis women's basketball team, initially pled not guilty to an assault charge after she was accused of punching a Bowling Green player in the face following the Memphis Tigers' loss in the Women's National Invitational Tournament (WNIT) on March 24, 2023, officials confirmed. She later changed her plea and was found guilty and her sentence included anger management.

=== Head coaches ===
Memphis coaching history
Tenure	Coach	Seasons	Record	Pct.
1919–1922	Martha Teuton	3	38–5–1	.875
1922–1923	W. H. Depriest	1	11–8	.579
1923–1924	Crowley Davis	1	4–4	.500
1924–1927	Leo Lindsey	3	32–8–1	.793
1929–1935	Ethel Blackman	8	57–29–2	.659
1972–1991	Mary Lou Johns	19	368–215	.631
1991–2004	Joye Lee-McNelis	13	229–156	.595
2004–2008	Blair Savage-Lansden	4	30–88	.254
2008–2021	Melissa McFerrin	13	140–116	.547
2021–2023	Katrina Merriweather	2	38–23	.623
2023–2026	Alex Simmons	3	30–61	.330
2026–	Hana Haden	1	–	–

== Year by year results ==
TCWSF—Tennessee College Women's Sports Federation

1. —Conference tournament winners

Season	Team	Overall	Conference	Standing	Postseason	Coaches' poll	AP poll
Mary Lou Johns (Independent, Metro) (1972–1991)
1972–73	Mary Lou Johns	17–6	–				
1973–74	Mary Lou Johns	23–9	–				
1974–75	Mary Lou Johns	29–9	–				
1975–76	Mary Lou Johns	19–8	–				
1976–77	Mary Lou Johns	27–9	–				
1977–78	Mary Lou Johns	29–9	–		Region II Tournament		
1978–79	Mary Lou Johns	26–7	–		TCWSF		
1979–80	Mary Lou Johns	19–12	–		TCWSF		
1980–81	Mary Lou Johns	20–11	–		TCWSF		
Metro Conference
1981–82	Mary Lou Johns	26–5	6–1	‡ (Metro)	NCAA Sixteen		
1982–83	Mary Lou Johns	20–12	6–3		NWIT Second Place		
1983–84	Mary Lou Johns	18–12	9–1				
1984–85	Mary Lou Johns	23–7	9–1	‡	NCAA First Round		
1985–86	Mary Lou Johns	16–12	7–1				
1986–87	Mary Lou Johns	20–9	10–2		NCAA Second Round (Bye)		
1987–88	Mary Lou Johns	15–15	7–5				
1988–89	Mary Lou Johns	9–19	2–11				
1989–90	Mary Lou Johns	6–22	3–11				
1990–91	Mary Lou Johns	6–22	4–10				
Mary Lou Johns:		368–215	63–46				
Great Midwest Conference
Joye Lee-McNelis (Great Midwest, Conference USA) (1992–2005)
1991–92	Joye Lee-McNelis	12–17	4–6	(Great Midwest)			
1992–93	Joye Lee-McNelis	12–16	3–7				
1993–94	Joye Lee-McNelis	17–12	8–5				
1994–95	Joye Lee-McNelis	22–8	9–2		NCAA Second Round		
Conference USA‡
1995–96	Joye Lee-McNelis	20–11	10–4	1st‡ (White) (CUSA)	NCAA First Round		
1996–97	Joye Lee-McNelis	22–7	12–2	T-1st (White)	NCAA First Round		
1997–98	Joye Lee-McNelis	22–8	13–3	1st‡ (National)	NCAA First Round		
1998–99	Joye Lee-McNelis	22–10	10–6	2nd (National)	WNIT Semifinals		
1999–2000	Joye Lee-McNelis	18–12	11–5	2nd (National)	WNIT Second Round		
2000–01	Joye Lee-McNelis	17–13	9–7	4th (National)	WNIT First Round		
2001–02	Joye Lee-McNelis	11–17	5–9	10th			
2002–03	Joye Lee-McNelis	13–15	6–8	T-7th			
2003–04	Joye Lee-McNelis	21–10	9–5	T-5th	WNIT Second Round		
Joye Lee-McNelis:		229–156	109–69				
Blair Savage-Lansden (Conference USA) (2004–2008)
2004–05	Blair Savage-Lansden	13–16	5–9	9th			
2005–06	Blair Savage-Lansden	3–25	1–15	12th			
2006–07	Blair Savage-Lansden	4–27	1–15	12th			
2007–08	Blair Savage-Lansden	10–20	7–9	T-6th			
Blair Savage-Lansden:		30–88	14–48				
Melissa McFerrin (Conference USA, American) (2008–2021)
2008–09	Melissa McFerrin	12–18	5–11	T-9th (CUSA)			
2009–10	Melissa McFerrin	20–14	10–6	T-2nd	WBI Finals		
2010–11	Melissa McFerrin	20–13	8–8	6th	WNIT First Round		
2011–12	Melissa McFerrin	25–8	13–3	2nd	WNIT Second Round		
2012–13	Melissa McFerrin	17–15	8–8	T-5th	WNIT First Round		
American Athletic Conference
2013–14	Melissa McFerrin	13–18	6–12	7th			
2014–15	Melissa McFerrin	14–17	7–11	7th			
2015–16	Melissa McFerrin	18–13	12–6	4th	WNIT First Round		
2016–17	Melissa McFerrin	14–16	7–9	T-5th			
2017–18	Melissa McFerrin	10–20	5–11	t-8th			
2018–19	Melissa McFerrin	11–20	5–11	T-8th			
2019–20	Melissa McFerrin	14–17	5–11	11th			
2020–21	Melissa McFerrin	4–15	2–11	10th			
Melissa McFerrin:		164–152	81–85				
Katrina Merriweather (American) (2021–2023)
2021–22	Katrina Merriweather	16–12	6–9	7th			
2022–23	Katrina Merriweather	22–11	11–4	2nd	WNIT Super Sixteen		
Katrina Merriweather:		38–23	17–13				
Alex Simmons (American) (2023–2026)
2023–24	Alex Simmons	13-17	9-9	6th			
Alex Simmons:		30–61	18–36				
Total:		770–581					
National champion Postseason invitational champion Conference regular season champion Conference regular season and conference tournament champion Division regular season champion Division regular season and conference tournament champion Conference tournament champion

== NCAA tournament results ==
Memphis has reached the NCAA tournament seven times, six officially, due to them vacating their participation in the 1985 tournament due to violations. They have a combined record of 2–7.

Year	Seed	Round	Opponent	Result
1982	#3	First Round; Sweet Sixteen	#6 Ole Miss #2 Tennessee	W 72–70; L 63–78
1985	#6	First Round	#3 Auburn	L 64–82
1987	#6	Second Round	#3 Virginia	L 75–76
1995	#8	First Round; Second Round	#9 USC #8 Vanderbilt	W 74–72; L 68–95
1996	#8	First Round	#9 Ohio State	L 75–97
1997	#11	First Round	#6 Notre Dame	L 62–93
1998	#5	First Round	#12 Youngstown State	L 80–91
