= McGonigle Hall =

Athletic facility in Philadelphia, Pennsylvania

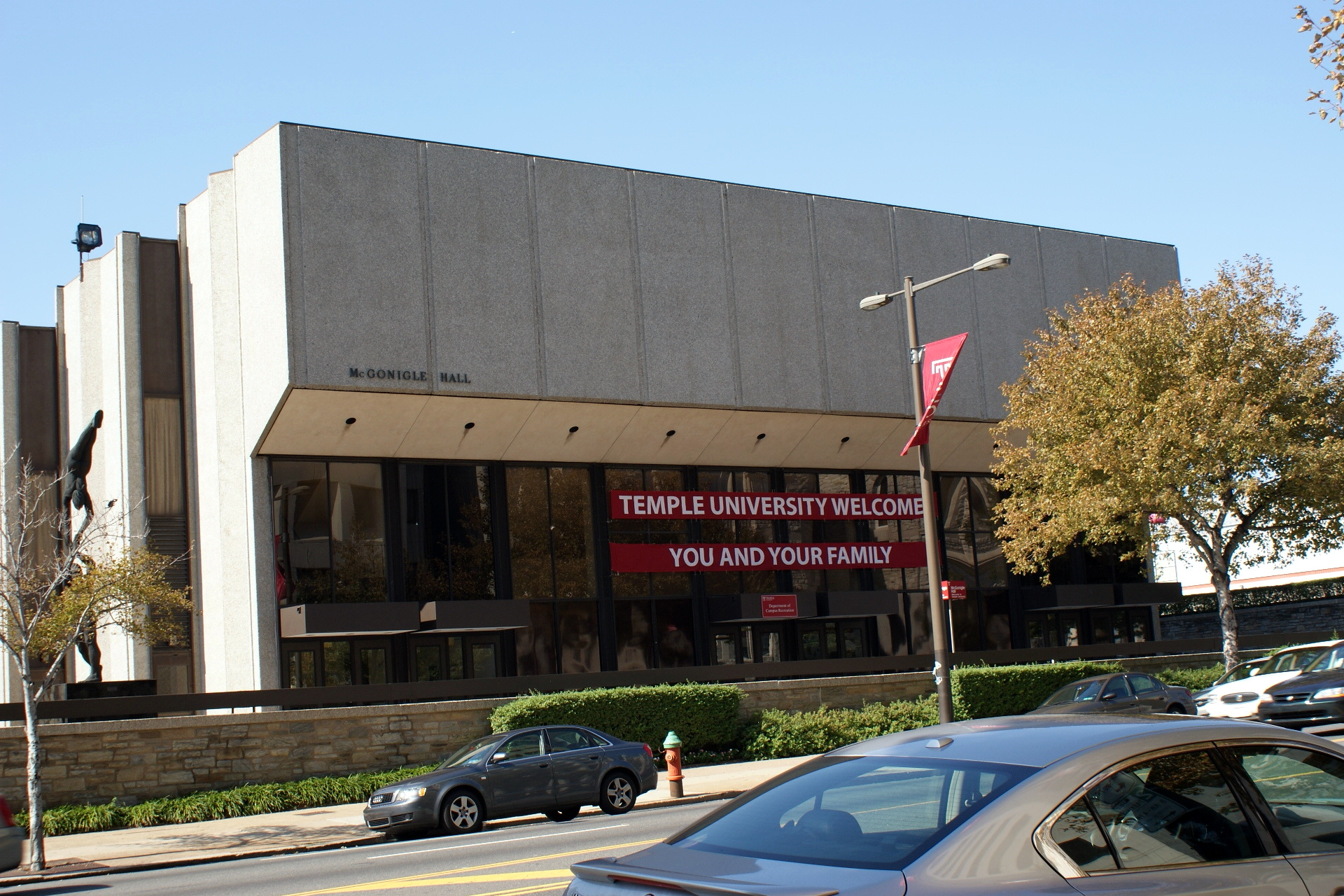
- Interactive map of McGonigle Hall
- Location: 1800 Broad St; Philadelphia, PA 19121
- Coordinates: 39.981029°N 75.158033°W
- Owner: Temple University
- Capacity: 3,900
- Public transit: SEPTA Metro: (Cecil B. Moore)

Construction
- Opened: December 2, 1969
- Architects: Nolen & Swinburne Associates (1969); H2L2 Architects / Planners, LLC (2012)

Tenants
- Temple Owls (recreation and offices)

McGonigle Hall is an athletic facility located on the campus of Temple University in Philadelphia, Pennsylvania. Temple women's basketball splits games between McGonigle Hall and the Liacouras Center. The gym is also home to Temple women's fencing, women's gymnastics, and volleyball.

== History and notable features ==
McGonigle Hall was built between 1967 and 1969 as part of a 250,000-square-foot building for Temple's intercollegiate athletics. The entire facility was built at a cost of $8 million and included teaching, research, and training facilities. The basketball arena originally sat 4,500 and was also home to the school's wrestling and gymnastics program. The building was named for Arthur T. McGonigle, a Temple University trustee and pretzel magnate from Reading, Pennsylvania who donated the new facility's furniture and equipment.

McGonigle Hall opened on December 2, 1969, with a Temple University men's basketball win over St. John's. The venue served as the home of men's basketball until it was replaced in 1997 by the Liacouras Center.

In 2012, the University completed a $48 million renovation and expansion of Pearson and McGonigle Halls, providing additional classrooms, faculty and coaching staff offices as well as state-of-the-art men's and women's basketball practice facilities.

== Temple men's basketball ==
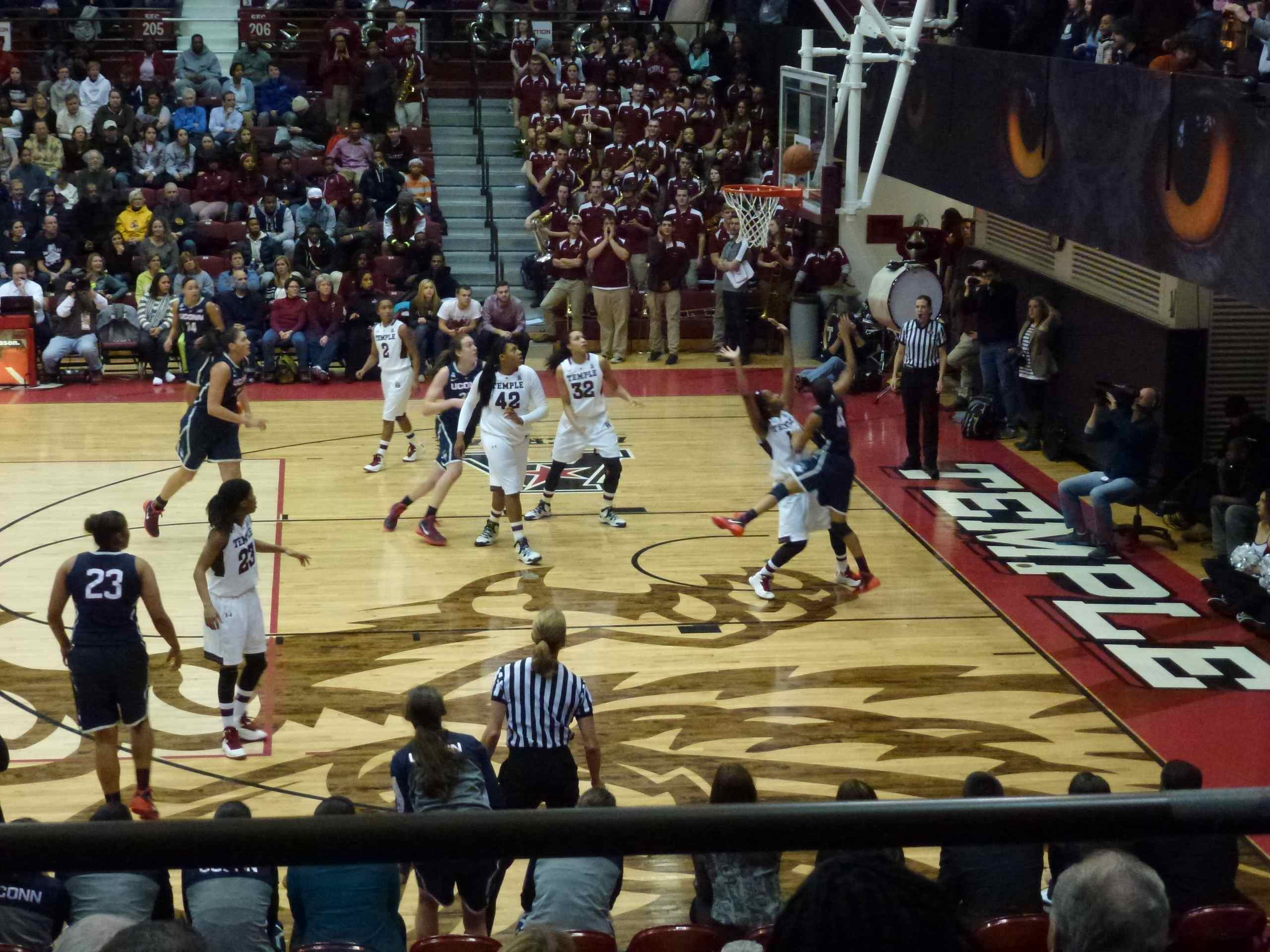
Temple hosts the University of Connecticut at McGonigle Hall on January 28, 2014.

The Temple men's basketball program held a practice open to the public at McGonigle Hall on October 15, 1969. The team played three home games that season at McGonigle and the rest of its home schedule at the Palestra on the campus of the University of Pennsylvania. Temple dedicated the venue on December 2, 1969 before its game against St. John's, which was preceded by a Temple freshman game against LaSalle.

Due to the venue's small size, Temple played the majority of its home schedule at the Palestra through 1984.

Coach John Chaney and the school decided to move most of its home games to McGonigle Hall to have a home-court advantage and build on campus spirit. Temple reached number one in the national rankings in February 1988. Despite ticket demand, then-school president Peter J. Liacouras refused to move the February 10, 1988 game against Villanova to the Spectrum, insisting the game be played at McGonigle on campus.

For basketball events such as selected 1987, 1990, and 1992 Atlantic 10 Conference men's basketball tournament games, its capacity was 4,500.

The Temple men's team played its final game at McConigle Hall on February 24, 1997, a 69–53 win over Fordham. The school welcomed back Harry Litwack for the game, along with the other players from the team's first season at the gym in 1969.

Temple played a "Turn Back the Clock Game" at McGonigle Hall against Bowling Green on December 28, 2009, featuring throwback uniforms and 1980s music, attire, and concession prices.

Temple had a record of 178 wins and 29 losses at McGonigle.

== Community events ==
The Black Panther Party held its Revolutionary People's Constitutional Convention at McGonigle Hall on September 5 and 6, 1970. Huey P. Newton spoke on September 5, 1970 to a crowd of 6,000 with another thousand outside.

President Jimmy Carter held a "Philadelphia town hall" meeting before an audience of 1,100 at McGonigle Hall on November 13, 1979. The president's helicopter landed at Geasy Field, 15th and Berks Street.

McConigle Hall has served as a concert venue on multiple occasions. Soul Asylum played the venue on April 17, 1997; Hüsker Dü and Christmas played on March 22, 1987; and Kris Kristofferson played on August 18, 1976.

NBC Sports Network held a "Fight Night" boxing event at McGonigle Hall on December 8, 2012 that featured Philadelphia native heavyweight Bryant Jennings.

Following the 2016 Democratic National Convention at the Wells Fargo Center in Philadelphia, Hillary Clinton and Tim Kaine held a campaign rally on July 29, 2016 at McGonigle Hall.
