= 2014–15 George Mason Patriots women's basketball team =

Female athletic team

2014–15 George Mason Patriots women's basketball
- Conference: Atlantic 10 Conference
- Record: 13–17 (5–11 A-10)
- Head coach: Nyla Milleson (2nd season)
- Assistant coaches: Tajama Abraham Ngongba (2nd season); Christopher Lewis (2nd season); Dionnah Jackson (2nd season)
- Home arena: Patriot Center

2014–15 Atlantic 10 women's basketball standings
	Conf.				Overall
Team	W		L	PCT	W		L	PCT
No. 19 George Washington^{†}	15	–	1	.938	29	–	4	.879
Dayton	14	–	2	.875	28	–	7	.800
Duquesne	12	–	4	.750	23	–	11	.676
Fordham	11	–	5	.688	21	–	12	.636
Richmond	9	–	7	.563	19	–	14	.576
Rhode Island	8	–	8	.500	17	–	13	.567
Saint Joseph's	8	–	8	.500	13	–	17	.433
VCU	7	–	9	.438	16	–	14	.533
Saint Louis	7	–	9	.438	15	–	16	.484
St. Bonaventure	5	–	11	.313	15	–	15	.500
La Salle	5	–	11	.313	15	–	16	.484
George Mason	5	–	11	.313	13	–	17	.433
UMass	5	–	11	.313	12	–	18	.400
Davidson	1	–	15	.063	5	–	25	.167
† 2015 A10 Tournament winner As of 30 March 2015; Rankings from AP poll

The 2014–15 George Mason Patriots women's basketball team represented George Mason University during the 2014–2015 College Basketball season. Nyla Milleson resumes the responsibility as head coach for a second consecutive season. The George Mason Patriots are members of the Atlantic 10 Conference and play their home games at the Patriot Center. This is their second season playing in the Atlantic 10 Conference after becoming new members of the conference last season. They finished the season 13–17, 5–11 in A-10 play to finish in a four-way tie for tenth place. They lost in the second round of the A-10 women's tournament to Saint Joseph's.

== 2014–2015 Media and televised games ==
=== George Mason Patriots Sports Network ===
Patriots games will be broadcast on WGMU Radio and streamed online through Patriot Vision. Most home games will also be featured on the A-10 Digital Network. Select games will be televised.

=== Televised games ===
George Mason has 2 conference games televised. One game on NBC Sports Network against the St. Louis Billikens with the result of George Mason winning 66–57 on 1/4/15 at the Patriot Center for their first conference win of the season. Another game on ESPNU on 1/18/15 against Richmond Spiders women's basketball with the result of George Mason losing 49–77 at the Robins Center.

=== Buzzer Beaters ===
Taylor Brown hits two buzzer beaters in two straight games. One against La Salle University to win 73–71. Another one against St. Bonaventure University to tie the game 53–53 to force overtime. The Patriots would go on to win 68–53. The buzzer beater against La Salle University was a euro-step layup when the game was tied 71-71. The other buzzer beater against St. Bonaventure University was a fade-away 3-pointer which went in all-net. The Patriots were down 53–50 with 7.5 seconds The video showed Taylor Brown being pushed to out of bounds while in shooting motion. St. Bonaventure University had a foul to give but let Taylor Brown tie the game, force the game into overtime, and let the Patriots win 68–55. Taylor Brown received attention from ABC 7 News after hitting the two buzzer beaters.

== Roster ==
2014–15 George Mason Patriots women's basketball team
Players
Coaches

Pos.	#	Name	Height	Year	Previous school	Hometown
G	0	Qierra Murray	5 ft 7 in (1.7 m)	Fr	Milford Mill Academy	Baltimore, MD
G	1	Jasmine Jackson	5 ft 9 in (1.75 m)	Sr	Old Bridge	Old Bridge, NJ
F	3	Sandra Ngoie	6 ft 1 in (1.85 m)	Sr	Fryshusets Gymnasium	Stockholm, Sweden
G	5	Reana Mohamed	5 ft 8 in (1.73 m)	Jr	Mary Louis Academy	Laurelton, NY
G/F	12	Kara Wright	5 ft 11 in (1.8 m)	RS So	DuPont Manual	Louisville, KY
F	21	Casey Davis	6 ft 2 in (1.88 m)	Fr	Elizabeth Seton	Gambrills, MD
G	22	Cydni Cole	5 ft 5 in (1.65 m)	Fr	Indian Creek School	Glen Brunie, MD
G	23	Mikala McGhee	5 ft 11 in (1.8 m)	RS So	Pattonville	Bridgeton, MO
F	24	Tiffany Padgett	6 ft 1 in (1.85 m)	RS Jr	St. Vincent Pallotti	Laurel, MD
F	24	Samantha Clark	6 ft 2 in (1.88 m)	Jr	St. Rose	Neptune, NJ
G	31	Taylor Brown	5 ft 7 in (1.7 m)	RS Jr	Bishop McNamara	Bowie, MD
G	32	Tayler Dodson	5 ft 11 in (1.8 m)	Fr	Spotswood	Harrisonburg, VA
F	33	Kristi Mokube	6 ft 2 in (1.88 m)	RS Jr	Central	Phenix City, AL
F	40	Talisha Watts	6 ft 2 in (1.88 m)	Sr	Brookville	Lynchburg, VA

Head coach

- Nyla Milleson (Kansas State)

Assistant coach(es)

- Tajama Abraham Ngongba (George Washington)
- Christopher Lewis (Emporia State)
- Dionnah Jackson (Oklahoma)

Legend

- (C) Team captain
- (S) Suspended
- (I) Ineligible
- (W) Walk-on
- Injured
- Current redshirt

Roster
Last update: 2014-07-07

== Schedule ==
Date time, TV	Rank^{#}	Opponent^{#}	Result	Record	Site (attendance) city, state
Exhibition
11/02/2014*; 2:00 pm		Bowie State	W 83–81	–	Patriot Center (279); Fairfax, VA
Regular Season
11/14/2014*; 5:00 pm		Virginia Tech	W 77–69	1–0	Patriot Center (1,119); Fairfax, VA
11/16/2014*; 3:30 pm		Morehead State	L 70–79	1–1	Patriot Center (369); Fairfax, VA
11/19/2014*; 7:00 pm		Delaware State	W 110–91	2–1	Patriot Center (334); Fairfax, VA
11/23/2014*; 2:00 pm		College of Charleston	W 71–61	3–1	Patriot Center (550); Fairfax, VA
11/25/2014*; 7:00 pm		at Navy	L 79–84	3–2	Alumni Hall (586); Annapolis, MD
11/28/2014*; 4:30 pm		vs. Abilene Christian; UMKC Plaza Lights Classic	L 86–88	3–3	Municipal Auditorium (597); Kansas City, MO
11/29/2014*; 2:00 pm		vs. Mississippi Valley State; UMKC Plaza Lights Classic	W 71–62	4–3	Municipal Auditorium (164); Kansas City, MO
12/03/2014*; 5:00 pm		East Tennessee State	L 71–84	4–4	Patriot Center (N/A); Fairfax, VA
12/06/2014*; 5:30 pm		at Saint Francis (PA)	W 86–77	5–4	DeGol Arena (634); Loretto, PA
12/19/2014*; 5:05 pm		vs. Winthrop; Wichita State Winter Classic	W 69–57	6–4	Charles Koch Arena (N/A); Wichita, KS
12/20/2014*; 1:05 pm		vs. Louisiana–Monroe; Wichita State Winter Classic	W 65–53	7–4	Charles Koch Arena (N/A); Wichita, KS
12/22/2014*; 7:00 pm		at Longwood	W 83–61	8–4	Willett Hall (419); Farmville, VA
12/28/2014*; 2:00 pm		at Towson	L 70–72	8–5	SECU Arena (515); Towson, MD
01/04/2015; 2:00 pm, NBCSN		Saint Louis	W 66–57	9–5 (1–0)	Patriot Center (623); Fairfax, VA
01/08/2015; 7:00 pm		at Duquesne	L 54–88	9–6 (1–1)	Palumbo Center (319); Pittsburgh, PA
01/11/2015; 1:00 pm		at La Salle	W 73–71	10–6 (2–1)	Tom Gola Arena (212); Philadelphia, PA
01/14/2015; 7:00 pm		St. Bonaventure	W 68–55 ^{OT}	11–6 (3–1)	Patriot Center (349); Fairfax, VA
01/18/2015; 12:00 pm, ESPNU		at Richmond	L 49–77	11–7 (3–2)	Robins Center (785); Richmond, VA
01/24/2015; 2:00 pm		Rhode Island	L 45–57	11–8 (3–3)	Patriot Center (863); Fairfax, VA
01/28/2015; 7:00 pm		at VCU	L 66–70	11–9 (3–4)	Siegel Center (457); Richmond, VA
01/31/2015; 2:00 pm		George Washington	L 52–87	11–10 (3–5)	Patriot Center (1,807); Fairfax, VA
02/05/2015; 7:00 pm		Dayton	L 73–84	11–11 (3–6)	Patriot Center (60); Fairfax, VA
02/08/2015; 2:00 pm		Davidson	W 63–60	12–11 (4–6)	Patriot Center (1,223); Fairfax, VA
02/11/2015; 11:45 am		at Massachusetts	L 79–85 ^{OT}	12–12 (4–7)	Mullins Center (1,398); Amherst, MA
02/14/2015; 12:00 pm		VCU	W 86–79	13–12 (5–7)	Patriot Center (636); Fairfax, VA
02/18/2015; 7:00 pm		at Saint Joseph's	L 51–82	13–13 (5–8)	Hagan Arena (1,043); Philadelphia, PA
02/21/2015; 8:00 pm		at Saint Louis	L 59–82	13–14 (5–9)	Chaifetz Arena (7,184); St. Louis, MO
02/25/2015; 7:00 pm		Fordham	L 55–79	13–15 (5–10)	Patriot Center (698); Fairfax, VA
03/01/2015; 2:00 pm		at No. 22 George Washington	L 45–80	13–16 (5–11)	Charles E. Smith Center (2,197); Washington, D.C.
Atlantic 10 Tournament
03/05/2015; 4:30 pm		vs. Saint Joseph's; Second Round	L 43–71	13–17	Richmond Coliseum (N/A); Richmond, VA
*Non-conference game. ^{#}Rankings from AP Poll. (#) Tournament seedings in parentheses. All times are in Eastern Time.

== Rankings ==
2014–15 NCAA Division I women's basketball rankings

+ Regular season polls	Poll	Pre- Season	Week 2	Week 3	Week 4	Week 5	Week 6	Week 7	Week 8	Week 9	Week 10	Week 11	Week 12	Week 13	Week 14	Week 15	Week 16	Week 17	Week 18	Final
AP	NR	NR	NR	NR	NR	NR	NR	NR	NR	NR	NR	NR	NR	NR	NR	NR	NR	NR	NR	
Coaches	NR	NR	NR	NR	NR	NR	NR	NR	NR	NR	NR	NR	NR	NR	NR	NR	NR	NR	NR	

Legend
	Increase in ranking
	Decrease in ranking
	No change
(RV)	Received votes
(NR)	Not ranked

== See also ==
- 2014–15 George Mason Patriots men's basketball team
- George Mason Patriots women's basketball
