= 2014–15 Saint Joseph's Hawks women's basketball team =

Intercollegiate basketball season

2014–15 Saint Joseph's Hawks women's basketball
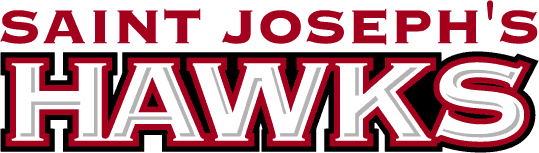
- Conference: Atlantic 10 Conference
- Record: 13–17 (8–8 A-10)
- Head coach: Cindy Griffin (14th season)
- Assistant coaches: Susan Moran (12th season); Stephanie McCaffrey (8th season); Jada Pierce (3rd season)
- Home arena: Hagan Arena

2014–15 Atlantic 10 women's basketball standings
	Conf.				Overall
Team	W		L	PCT	W		L	PCT
No. 19 George Washington^{†}	15	–	1	.938	29	–	4	.879
Dayton	14	–	2	.875	28	–	7	.800
Duquesne	12	–	4	.750	23	–	11	.676
Fordham	11	–	5	.688	21	–	12	.636
Richmond	9	–	7	.563	19	–	14	.576
Rhode Island	8	–	8	.500	17	–	13	.567
Saint Joseph's	8	–	8	.500	13	–	17	.433
VCU	7	–	9	.438	16	–	14	.533
Saint Louis	7	–	9	.438	15	–	16	.484
St. Bonaventure	5	–	11	.313	15	–	15	.500
La Salle	5	–	11	.313	15	–	16	.484
George Mason	5	–	11	.313	13	–	17	.433
UMass	5	–	11	.313	12	–	18	.400
Davidson	1	–	15	.063	5	–	25	.167
† 2015 A10 Tournament winner As of 30 March 2015; Rankings from AP poll

The 2014–15 Saint Joseph's Hawks women's basketball team represented the Saint Joseph's University during the 2014–15 college basketball season. Cindy Griffin assumed the responsibility as head coach for her fourteenth season. The Hawks were members of the Atlantic 10 Conference and play their home games at the Hagan Arena. They finished the season 13–17, 8–8 in A-10 play to finish in a tie for sixth place. They advanced to the quarterfinals of the A-10 women's tournament, where they lost to Dayton.

== 2014–15 media ==
All non-televised Hawks home games will air on the A-10 Digital Network. All Hawks games will be streamed via the Saint Joseph's Sports Network on sjuhawks.com.

== 2014–15 Roster ==
2014–15 Saint Joseph's Hawks women's basketball team
Players
Coaches

Pos.	#	Name	Height	Year	Previous school	Hometown
G	2	Mackenzie Rule	5 ft 6 in (1.68 m)	So	Cardinal O'Hara	West Chester, Pa.
G	3	Ciara Andrews	5 ft 9 in (1.75 m)	Jr	Cheltenham	Glenside, Pa.
G	4	Natasha Cloud	6 ft 0 in (1.83 m)	Sr	Cardinal O'Hara	Broomall, Pa.
F	11	Lisanne de Jonge	5 ft 11 in (1.8 m)	So	Luzac College	Nijmegen, Netherlands
F	13	Ashley Robinson	6 ft 2 in (1.88 m)	Sr	Archbishop Wood	Warrington, Pa.
G	15	Kathleen Fitzpatrick	5 ft 9 in (1.75 m)	So	Academy of Notre Dame de Namur	Drexel Hill, Pa.
G	21	Avery Marz	5 ft 7 in (1.7 m)	Fr	Wilson West Lawn	Sinking Springs, Pa.
F	22	Jessica Pongonis	6 ft 1 in (1.85 m)	So	Hamilton Southeastern	Fishers, Ind.
G	23	Jordan Strode	5 ft 8 in (1.73 m)	RS So	Hickory Ridge	Harrisburg, N.C.
G	30	Sarah Veilleux	6 ft 0 in (1.83 m)	Fr	RHAM	Hebron, Conn.
G	32	Chelsea Woods	6 ft 0 in (1.83 m)	Fr	Freire Charter	Philadelphia, Pa.
F	33	Adashia Franklyn	6 ft 1 in (1.85 m)	Fr	West Chester Bayard Rustin	West Chester, Pa.
F	34	Amanda Fioravanti	6 ft 1 in (1.85 m)	So	Our Lady of Good Counsel	Frederick, Md.
F	40	Candace Belvedere	6 ft 2 in (1.88 m)	Fr	Kellenberg Memorial	Merrick, N.Y.
F	41	Sarah Fairbanks	6 ft 1 in (1.85 m)	Jr	Elizabethtown Area	Elizabethtown, Pa.

Head coach

Cindy Griffin (Saint Joseph's)

Assistant coach(es)

Susan Moran (Saint Joseph's)
Stephanie McCaffrey (Saint Joseph's)
Jada Pierce (West Chester)

Legend

- (C) Team captain
- (S) Suspended
- (I) Ineligible
- (W) Walk-on
- Injured
- Current redshirt

Roster
Last update: 2014-09-14

== Schedule ==
Date time, TV	Rank^{#}	Opponent^{#}	Result	Record	Site (attendance) city, state
Regular Season
11/14/2014*; 7:00 pm		at No. 24 Rutgers	L 52–76	0–1	Louis Brown Athletic Center (1,805); Piscataway, NJ
11/18/2014*; 7:00 pm		Temple; Rivalry	W 78–74 ^{OT}	1–1	Hagan Arena (1,351); Philadelphia, PA
11/22/2014*; 2:00 pm		at Liberty	L 75–76 ^{OT}	1–2	Vines Center (438); Lynchburg, VA
11/25/2014*; 7:00 pm		at Drexel	L 63–76	1–3	Daskalakis Athletic Center (607); Philadelphia, PA
11/29/2014*; 2:30 pm		vs. St. Francis Brooklyn; Seton Hall Thanksgiving Tournament	W 66–42	2–3	Walsh Gymnasium (N/A); South Orange, NJ
11/30/2014*; 2:30 pm		at Seton Hall; Seton Hall Thanksgiving Tournament	L 60–77	2–4	Walsh Gymnasium (502); South Orange, NJ
12/04/2014*; 7:00 pm		Lehigh	L 71–73	2–5	Hagan Arena (612); Philadelphia, PA
12/07/2014*; 2:00 pm		Villanova; Holy War	W 58–54	3–5	Hagan Arena (1,531); Philadelphia, PA
12/09/2014*; 5:30 pm		at Penn	L 51–65	3–6	Palestra (503); Philadelphia, PA
12/21/2014*; 1:00 pm		at No. 5 Notre Dame	L 50–64	3–7	Edmund P. Joyce Center (8,630); South Bend, IN
12/28/2014*; 2:00 pm		Quinnipiac; Hawk Classic semifinals	L 67–69	3–8	Hagan Arena (1,278); Philadelphia, PA
12/29/2014*; 2:00 pm		Cal State Northridge; Hawk Classic 3rd place game	W 61–54	4–8	Hagan Arena (1,051); Philadelphia, PA
01/03/2015; 7:00 pm		VCU	W 63–46	5–8 (1–0)	Hagan Arena (1,143); Philadelphia, PA
01/07/2015; 7:00 pm		at George Washington	L 69–83	5–9 (1–1)	Charles E. Smith Center (522); Washington, D.C.
01/10/2015; 2:00 pm		Massachusetts	L 47–65	5–10 (1–2)	Hagan Arena (751); Philadelphia, PA
01/15/2015; 7:00 pm, CBSSN		at Fordham	L 47–57	5–11 (1–3)	Rose Hill Gymnasium (577); Bronx, NY
01/18/2015; 4:00 pm, CBSSN		at Duquesne	L 54–63	5–12 (1–4)	Palumbo Center (908); Pittsburgh, PA
01/24/2015; 2:00 pm		St. Bonaventure	W 66–48	6–12 (2–4)	Hagan Arena (1,086); Philadelphia, PA
01/29/2015; 12:30 pm		at Saint Louis	L 51–52	6–13 (2–5)	Chaifetz Arena (1,517); St. Louis, MO
01/31/2015; 2:00 pm		at Davidson	W 57–52	7–13 (3–5)	John M. Belk Arena (671); Davidson, NC
02/04/2015; 7:00 pm		La Salle	W 70–64	8–13 (4–5)	Hagan Arena (651); Philadelphia, PA
02/08/2015; 2:00 pm		Fordham	L 47–48	8–14 (4–6)	Hagan Arena (1,081); Philadelphia, PA
02/11/2015; 7:00 pm		at Rhode Island	L 61–63 ^{OT}	8–15 (4–7)	Ryan Center (403); Kingston, RI
02/15/2015; 12:00 pm, CBSSN		at Dayton	L 64–82	8–16 (4–8)	UD Arena (1,819); Dayton, OH
02/18/2015; 7:00 pm		George Mason	W 82–51	9–16 (5–8)	Hagan Arena (1,043); Philadelphia, PA
02/21/2015; 2:00 pm		Richmond	W 61–59	10–16 (6–8)	Hagan Arena (731); Philadelphia, PA
02/25/2015; 7:00 pm		Duquesne	W 60–49	11–16 (7–8)	Hagan Arena (751); Philadelphia, PA
03/01/2015; 1:00 pm		at La Salle	W 67–55	12–16 (8–8)	Tom Gola Arena (643); Philadelphia, PA
Atlantic 10 Tournament
03/05/2015; 4:30 pm		vs. George Mason; Second Round	W 71–43	13–16	Richmond Coliseum (N/A); Richmond, VA
03/06/2015; 4:30 pm, ASN		vs. Dayton; Quarterfinals	L 61–80	13–17	Richmond Coliseum (1,692); Richmond, VA
*Non-conference game. ^{#}Rankings from AP Poll. (#) Tournament seedings in parentheses. All times are in Eastern Time.

== Rankings ==
2014–15 NCAA Division I women's basketball rankings

+ Regular season polls	Poll	Pre- Season	Week 2	Week 3	Week 4	Week 5	Week 6	Week 7	Week 8	Week 9	Week 10	Week 11	Week 12	Week 13	Week 14	Week 15	Week 16	Week 17	Week 18	Final
AP	NR	NR	NR	NR	NR	NR	NR	NR	NR	NR	NR	NR	NR	NR	NR	NR	NR	NR	NR	
Coaches	NR	NR	NR	NR	NR	NR	NR	NR	NR	NR	NR	NR	NR	NR	NR	NR	NR	NR	NR	

Legend
	Increase in ranking
	Decrease in ranking
	No change
(RV)	Received votes
(NR)	Not ranked

== See also ==
- 2014–15 Saint Joseph's Hawks men's basketball team
- Saint Joseph's Hawks women's basketball
