= 2014–15 Richmond Spiders women's basketball team =

Intercollegiate basketball season

2014–15 Richmond Spiders women's basketball

WNIT, Second Round
- Conference: Atlantic 10 Conference
- Record: 19–14 (9–7 A-10)
- Head coach: Michael Shafer (10th season)
- Assistant coaches: Cori Chambers (2nd season); Ebony Tanner Moore (8th season); John Miller (1st season)
- Home arena: Robins Center

2014–15 Atlantic 10 women's basketball standings
	Conf.				Overall
Team	W		L	PCT	W		L	PCT
No. 19 George Washington^{†}	15	–	1	.938	29	–	4	.879
Dayton	14	–	2	.875	28	–	7	.800
Duquesne	12	–	4	.750	23	–	11	.676
Fordham	11	–	5	.688	21	–	12	.636
Richmond	9	–	7	.563	19	–	14	.576
Rhode Island	8	–	8	.500	17	–	13	.567
Saint Joseph's	8	–	8	.500	13	–	17	.433
VCU	7	–	9	.438	16	–	14	.533
Saint Louis	7	–	9	.438	15	–	16	.484
St. Bonaventure	5	–	11	.313	15	–	15	.500
La Salle	5	–	11	.313	15	–	16	.484
George Mason	5	–	11	.313	13	–	17	.433
UMass	5	–	11	.313	12	–	18	.400
Davidson	1	–	15	.063	5	–	25	.167
† 2015 A10 Tournament winner As of 30 March 2015; Rankings from AP poll

The 2014–15 Richmond Spiders women's basketball team represented the University of Richmond during the 2014–15 college basketball season. Michael Shafer assumes the responsibility as head coach for his tenth season. The Spiders were members of the Atlantic 10 Conference and played their home games at the Robins Center. They finished the season 19–14, 9–7 in A-10 play to finish in fifth place. They advanced to the quarterfinals of the Atlantic 10 women's tournament, where they lost to Fordham. They were invited to the Women's National Invitation Tournament, where they defeated Stetson in the first round before losing to a A-10 member Duquesne in the second round.

== 2014–15 media ==
All Spiders games are broadcast on WTVR 6.3 with Robert Fish on the call. The games are also streamed on Spider TV.

== Roster ==
2014–15 Richmond Spiders women's basketball team
Players
Coaches

Pos.	#	Name	Height	Year	Previous school	Hometown
G	0	Kylie Murphree	5 ft 9 in (1.75 m)	Fr	Fairfax	Fairfax, Virginia
G	1	Bria Powell	5 ft 9 in (1.75 m)	Jr	Princess Anne	Virginia Beach, Virginia
G	2	Olivia Healy	5 ft 11 in (1.8 m)	So	Reading	Reading, Massachusetts
G	4	Janelle Hubbard	5 ft 8 in (1.73 m)	So	Elizabeth Seton	Glenn Dale, Maryland
G	10	Dazia Hall	5 ft 9 in (1.75 m)	So	The Bullis School	Ashburn, Virginia
G	11	Micaela Parson	5 ft 7 in (1.7 m)	Fr	Monacan	North Chesterfield, Virginia
G	12	Keri Soppe	5 ft 9 in (1.75 m)	Sr	Irondequoit	Rochester, New York
F	14	Alicia Hudalla	6 ft 1 in (1.85 m)	Fr	Glen Allen	Glen Allen, Virginia
F/C	15	Karleigh Wike	6 ft 4 in (1.93 m)	Fr	East Rowan	Salisbury, North Carolina
G	23	Lauren Tolson	5 ft 8 in (1.73 m)	Jr	Frederick	Frederick, Maryland
F	24	Yazmean Burgess	6 ft 3 in (1.91 m)	Sr	T.C. Roberson	Asheville, North Carolina
C	32	Rennie Harrison	6 ft 4 in (1.93 m)	Fr	Episcopal	Silver Springs, Maryland
F	34	Genevieve Okoro	6 ft 0 in (1.83 m)	RS Sr	Eastern Regional	Gibbsboro, New Jersey
F	44	Amber Battle	6 ft 3 in (1.91 m)	Sr	Middle Creek	Apex, North Carolina
F	52	Liz Brown	6 ft 3 in (1.91 m)	Sr	Seton Keough	Baltimore, Maryland

Head coach

- Michael Shafer (William & Mary)

Assistant coach(es)

- Ebony Tanner Moore (Richmond)

Cori Chambers (Georgia) John Miller (Mount Saint Mary's)

Legend

- (C) Team captain
- (S) Suspended
- (I) Ineligible
- (W) Walk-on
- Injured
- Current redshirt

Roster
Last update: 2014-07-08

== Schedule ==
Date time, TV	Rank^{#}	Opponent^{#}	Result	Record	Site (attendance) city, state
Regular Season
11/14/2014*; 4:00 pm		Providence	W 75–59	1–0	Robins Center (561); Richmond, Virginia
11/16/2014*; 2:00 pm		Georgetown	W 65–57	2–0	Robins Center (597); Richmond, Virginia
11/20/2014*; 7:00 pm		Longwood	W 80–50	3–0	Robins Center (386); Richmond, Virginia
11/27/2014*; 8:00 pm		vs. Central Michigan; South Point Thanksgiving Shootout	L 56–61	3–1	South Point Arena (157); Las Vegas
11/29/2014*; 4:00 pm		vs. Arkansas; South Point Thanksgiving Shootout	L 55–74	3–2	South Point Arena (177); Las Vegas, Nevada
12/03/2014*; 7:00 pm		at James Madison	L 68–79	3–3	JMU Convocation Center (2,258); Harrisonburg, Virginia
12/06/2014*; 7:00 pm		Hampton	L 53–64	3–4	Robins Center (529); Richmond, Virginia
12/14/2014*; 2:00 pm		Wake Forest	W 79–72	4–4	Robins Center (521); Richmond, Virginia
12/17/2014*; 4:30 pm		at UNC Wilmington	W 77–67	5–4	Trask Coliseum (366); Wilmington, North Carolina
12/21/2014*; 2:00 pm		at Eastern Kentucky	W 70–56	6–4	Alumni Coliseum (250); Richmond, Kentucky
12/28/2014*; 2:00 pm		at William & Mary	W 59–56	7–4	Kaplan Arena (541); Williamsburg, Virginia
12/30/2014*; 8:00 pm		at UAB	W 71–65 ^{OT}	8–4	Bartow Arena (355); Birmingham, Alabama
01/04/2015; 3:30 pm, CBSSN		at Fordham	L 64–65 ^{OT}	8–5 (0–1)	Rose Hill Gymnasium (540); Bronx, New York
01/07/2015; 7:00 pm		St. Bonaventure	W 67–61	9–5 (1–1)	Robins Center (381); Richmond, Virginia
01/10/2015; 2:00 pm		at George Washington	L 67–77	9–6 (1–2)	Charles E. Smith Center (530); Washington, D.C.
01/14/2015*; 7:00 pm		at Penn	L 47–49	9–7	Palestra (477); Philadelphia
01/18/2015; 12:00 pm, ESPNU		George Mason	W 77–49	10–7 (2–2)	Robins Center (785); Richmond, Virginia
01/21/2015; 7:00 pm		at Davidson	W 56–48	11–7 (3–2)	John M. Belk Arena (464); Davidson, North Carolina
01/24/2015; 2:00 pm		Massachusetts	W 64–44	12–7 (4–2)	Robins Center (520); Richmond, Virginia
01/28/2015; 12:00 pm		Dayton	L 62–78	12–8 (4–3)	Robins Center (763); Richmond, Virginia
01/30/2015; 7:00 pm		at Rhode Island	W 54–50	13–8 (5–3)	Ryan Center (592); Kingston, Rhode Island
02/04/2015; 7:00 pm		VCU	W 67–63	14–8 (6–3)	Robins Center (521); Richmond, Virginia
02/07/2015; 3:30 pm		Saint Louis	W 75–72 ^{OT}	15–8 (7–3)	Robins Center (1,098); Richmond, Virginia
02/11/2015; 7:00 pm		at Dayton	L 41–79	15–9 (7–4)	UD Arena (1,614); Dayton, Ohio
02/14/2015; 4:00 pm		La Salle	W 72–60	16–9 (8–4)	Robins Center (561); Richmond, Virginia
02/18/2015; 7:00 pm		at Duquesne	L 51–58 ^{OT}	16–10 (8–5)	Palumbo Center (852); Pittsburgh
02/21/2015; 2:00 pm		at Saint Joseph's	L 59–61	16–11 (8–6)	Hagan Arena (731); Philadelphia
02/26/2015; 7:00 pm		No. 22 George Washington	L 69–81 ^{OT}	16–12 (8–7)	Robins Center (421); Richmond, Virginia
03/01/2015; 2:00 pm, CBSSN		at VCU	W 55–49	17–12 (9–7)	Siegel Center (1,800); Richmond, Virginia
Atlantic 10 Tournament
03/05/2015; 2:00 pm		vs. Massachusetts; Second Round	W 67–63	18–12	Richmond Coliseum (N/A); Richmond, Virginia
03/06/2015; 2:00 pm, ASN		vs. Fordham; Quarterfinals	L 45–46	18–13	Richmond Coliseum (N/A); Richmond, Virginia
WNIT
03/20/2015*; 7:00 pm		at Stetson; First Round	W 67–66	19–13	Edmunds Center (434); DeLand, Florida
03/24/2015*; 7:00 pm		at Duquesne; Second Round	L 47–48	19–14	Palumbo Center (570); Pittsburgh
*Non-conference game. ^{#}Rankings from AP Poll. (#) Tournament seedings in parentheses. All times are in Eastern Time.

== Rankings ==
2014–15 NCAA Division I women's basketball rankings

Regular season polls
Poll	Pre- Season	Week 2	Week 3	Week 4	Week 5	Week 6	Week 7	Week 8	Week 9	Week 10	Week 11	Week 12	Week 13	Week 14	Week 15	Week 16	Week 17	Week 18	Final
AP	NR	NR	NR	NR	NR	NR	NR	NR	NR	NR	NR	NR	NR	NR	NR	NR	NR	NR	NR
Coaches	NR	NR	RV	NR	NR	NR	NR	NR	NR	NR	NR	NR	NR	NR	NR	NR	NR	NR	NR

Legend
	Increase in ranking
	Decrease in ranking
	No change
(RV)	Received votes
(NR)	Not ranked

== See also ==
- 2014–15 Richmond Spiders men's basketball team
- Richmond Spiders women's basketball
