= 2014–15 Fordham Rams women's basketball team =

Intercollegiate basketball season

2014–15 Fordham Rams women's basketball

WNIT, Second Round
- Conference: Atlantic 10 Conference
- Record: 21–12 (11–5 A-10)
- Head coach: Stephanie Gaitley (4th season)
- Assistant coaches: Angelika Szumilo (4th season); Jenna Cosgrove (4th season); Whitney Coleman (4th season)
- Home arena: Rose Hill Gymnasium

2014–15 Atlantic 10 women's basketball standings
	Conf.				Overall
Team	W		L	PCT	W		L	PCT
No. 19 George Washington^{†}	15	–	1	.938	29	–	4	.879
Dayton	14	–	2	.875	28	–	7	.800
Duquesne	12	–	4	.750	23	–	11	.676
Fordham	11	–	5	.688	21	–	12	.636
Richmond	9	–	7	.563	19	–	14	.576
Rhode Island	8	–	8	.500	17	–	13	.567
Saint Joseph's	8	–	8	.500	13	–	17	.433
VCU	7	–	9	.438	16	–	14	.533
Saint Louis	7	–	9	.438	15	–	16	.484
St. Bonaventure	5	–	11	.313	15	–	15	.500
La Salle	5	–	11	.313	15	–	16	.484
George Mason	5	–	11	.313	13	–	17	.433
UMass	5	–	11	.313	12	–	18	.400
Davidson	1	–	15	.063	5	–	25	.167
† 2015 A10 Tournament winner As of 30 March 2015; Rankings from AP poll

The 2014–15 Fordham Rams women's basketball team represented Fordham University during the 2014–15 NCAA Division I women's basketball season. Stephanie Gaitley served as head coach for a fourth consecutive season. The Rams were members of the Atlantic 10 Conference and played their home games at the Rose Hill Gymnasium. They finished the season 21–12, 11–5 in A-10 play to finish in fourth place. They advanced to the semifinals of the A-10 women's tournament where they lost to George Washington. They were invited to the Women's National Invitation Tournament where they defeated Central Connecticut in the first round before losing to St. John's in the second round.

== 2014–15 media ==
=== Fordham Rams Sports Network ===
Fordham Rams games will be broadcast on WFUV Sports and streamed online through the Fordham Portal with Kenny Ducy and Matt Moro providing the call. Most home games will also be featured on the A-10 Digital Network. Select games will be televised.

== Roster ==
2014–15 Fordham Rams women's basketball team
Players
Coaches

Pos.	#	Name	Height	Year	Previous school	Hometown
G	1	Aaliyah Jones	5 ft 7 in (1.7 m)	Fr	Murray Bergtraum	Brooklyn, NY
G	3	Alina Gjerkes	5 ft 11 in (1.8 m)	So	Gimnazija Bezigrad	Grosuplje, Slovenia
G	4	Taryn Durant	5 ft 7 in (1.7 m)	Sr	McDonough	Owings Mills, MD
F	5	G'mrice Davis	6 ft 2 in (1.88 m)	Fr	Girard College	Philadelphia, PA
F	11	Emily Tapio	6 ft 0 in (1.83 m)	Sr	Brewster	Brewster, NY
G	13	Tiffany Ruffin	5 ft 7 in (1.7 m)	RS Sr	Winnacunnet	Seabrook, NH
F	14	Danielle Padovano	6 ft 0 in (1.83 m)	Sr	South Brunswick	Dayton, NJ
G/F	22	Danielle Burns	5 ft 10 in (1.78 m)	So	Stonewall Jackson	Gainesville, VA
G	23	Khadijah Gibson	5 ft 8 in (1.73 m)	Jr	Henry Wise	Upper Marlboro, MD
F	24	Samantha Clark	6 ft 2 in (1.88 m)	Jr	St. Rose	Neptune, NJ
G	25	Hannah Missry	5 ft 8 in (1.73 m)	So	Jackson Memorial	Jackson, NJ
F	31	Liz Milner	6 ft 1 in (1.85 m)	Sr	Haldane	Cold Spring, NY
F	32	Christina Gaskin	6 ft 1 in (1.85 m)	Sr	Barkey Abbey Academy	Hockley, England

Head coach

- Stephanie Gaitley (Villanova)

Assistant coach(es)

- Angelika Szumilo (LIU Brooklyn)
- Jenna Cosgrove (Endicott)
- Whitney Coleman (Monmouth)

Legend

- (C) Team captain
- (S) Suspended
- (I) Ineligible
- (W) Walk-on
- Injured
- Current redshirt

Roster
Last update: 2014-07-07

== Schedule ==
Date time, TV	Rank^{#}	Opponent^{#}	Result	Record	Site (attendance) city, state
Exhibition
11/08/2014*; 2:00 pm		Holy Family	W 84–39	-	Rose Hill Gymnasium (421); Bronx, NY
Regular Season
11/14/2014*; 11:30 am		Iona	L 51–72	0–1	Rose Hill Gymnasium (437); Bronx, NY
11/16/2014*; 2:00 pm		at No. 24 Syracuse	L 42–59	0–2	Carrier Dome (N/A); Syracuse, NY
11/18/2014*; 7:00 pm		Mount St. Mary's	W 61–37	1–2	Rose Hill Gymnasium (313); Bronx, NY
11/21/2014*; 7:00 pm, SNY		Hofstra	W 60–46	2–2	Rose Hill Gymnasium (285); Bronx, NY
11/25/2014*; 7:00 pm		at Delaware	W 49–44	3–2	Bob Carpenter Center (1,498); Newark, DE
11/28/2014*; 1:00 pm		vs. Incarnate Word; UTSA Thanksgiving Classic	W 74–42	4–2	Convocation Center (N/A); San Antonio, TX
11/30/2014*; 3:30 pm		vs. Drake; UTSA Thanksgiving Classic	L 56–62	4–3	Convocation Center (849); San Antonio, TX
12/05/2014*; 7:00 pm		Seton Hall	L 43–56	4–4	Rose Hill Gymnasium (415); Bronx, NY
12/07/2014*; 2:00 pm		at Temple	W 71–64	5–4	McGonigle Hall (542); Philadelphia, PA
12/09/2014*; 7:00 pm		at Central Connecticut	W 72–36	6–4	William H. Detrick Gymnasium (403); New Britain, CT
12/14/2014*; 2:00 pm		Manhattan; Battle of the Bronx	W 70–41	7–4	Rose Hill Gymnasium (362); Bronx, NY
12/29/2014*; 1:00 pm		Savannah State; Fordham Holiday Classic semifinals	W 63–53	8–4	Rose Hill Gymnasium (647); Bronx, NY
12/30/2014*; 3:30 pm		Princeton; Fordham Holiday Classic championship	L 53–67	8–5	Rose Hill Gymnasium (510); Bronx, NY
01/04/2015; 3:30 pm, CBSSN		Richmond	W 65–64 ^{OT}	9–5 (1–0)	Rose Hill Gymnasium (540); Bronx, NY
01/08/2015; 7:00 pm		at La Salle	W 70–59	10–5 (2–0)	Tom Gola Arena (573); Philadelphia, PA
01/11/2015; 4:00 pm, NBCSN		at St. Bonaventure	W 72–62	11–5 (3–0)	Reilly Center (769); Olean, NY
01/15/2015; 7:00 pm, CBSSN		Saint Joseph's	W 57–47	12–5 (4–0)	Rose Hill Gymnasium (577); Bronx, NY
01/18/2015; 2:00 pm		VCU	W 60–51	13–5 (5–0)	Rose Hill Gymnasium (358); Bronx, NY
01/21/2015; 12:00 pm		Massachusetts	W 65–42	14–5 (6–0)	Rose Hill Gymnasium (2,236); Bronx, NY
01/24/2015; 4:00 pm, CBSSN		at Saint Louis	L 50–54	14–6 (6–1)	Chaifetz Arena (3,920); St. Louis, MO
01/28/2015; 7:00 pm		at Davidson	W 66–45	15–6 (7–1)	John M. Belk Arena (339); Davidson, NC
01/31/2015; 2:00 pm		Duquesne	L 46–56	15–7 (7–2)	Rose Hill Gymnasium (421); Bronx, NY
02/05/2015; 7:00 pm, SNY		St. Bonaventure	W 54–51	16–7 (8–2)	Rose Hill Gymnasium (827); Bronx, NY
02/08/2015; 2:00 pm		at Saint Joseph's	W 48–47	17–7 (9–2)	Hagan Arena (1,081); Philadelphia, PA
02/15/2015; 2:00 pm		at Rhode Island	L 56–71	17–8 (9–3)	Ryan Center (433); Kingston, RI
02/18/2015; 7:00 pm		Dayton	L 45–59	17–9 (9–4)	Rose Hill Gymnasium (522); Bronx, NY
02/21/2015; 2:00 pm		at No. 24 George Washington	L 65–83	17–10 (9–5)	Charles E. Smith Center (876); Washington, D.C.
02/25/2015; 7:00 pm		at George Mason	W 79–55	18–10 (10–5)	Patriot Center (698); Fairfax, VA
03/01/2015; 2:00 pm		Davidson	W 54–46	19–10 (11–5)	Rose Hill Gymnasium (741); Bronx, NY
Atlantic 10 Tournament
03/06/2015; 2:00 pm, ASN		vs. Richmond; Quarterfinals	W 46–45	20–10	Richmond Coliseum (N/A); Richmond, VA
03/07/2015; 11:00 am, CBSSN		vs. No. 21 George Washington; Semifinals	L 60–72	20–11	Richmond Coliseum (N/A); Richmond, VA
WNIT
03/19/2015*; 7:00 pm		Central Connecticut; First Round	W 70–67	21–11	Rose Hill Gymnasium (345); Bronx, NY
03/22/2015*; 2:00 pm, ESPN3		at St. John's; Second Round/Rivalry	L 63–77	21–12	Carnesecca Arena (327); Queens, NY
*Non-conference game. ^{#}Rankings from AP Poll. (#) Tournament seedings in parentheses. All times are in Eastern Time.

== Rankings ==
2014–15 NCAA Division I women's basketball rankings

Regular season polls
Poll	Pre- Season	Week 2	Week 3	Week 4	Week 5	Week 6	Week 7	Week 8	Week 9	Week 10	Week 11	Week 12	Week 13	Week 14	Week 15	Week 16	Week 17	Week 18	Final
AP	NR	NR	NR	NR	NR	NR	NR	NR	NR	NR	NR	NR	NR	NR	NR	NR	NR	NR	NR
Coaches	NR	NR	NR	NR	NR	NR	NR	NR	NR	NR	NR	NR	NR	NR	NR	NR	NR	NR	NR

Legend
	Increase in ranking
	Decrease in ranking
	No change
(RV)	Received votes
(NR)	Not ranked

== See also ==
- 2014–15 Fordham Rams men's basketball team
- Fordham Rams women's basketball
