= 2014–15 George Washington Colonials women's basketball team =

Intercollegiate basketball season

2014–15 George Washington Colonials women's basketball

Junkanoo Jam Freeport Division Champions A-10 Regular Season & Tournament Champions

NCAA Women's Tournament, first round
- Conference: Atlantic 10 Conference

Ranking
- Coaches: No. 19
- AP: No. 19
- Record: 29–4 (15–1 A-10)
- Head coach: Jonathan Tsipis (3rd season)
- Assistant coaches: Diane Richardson (3rd season); Bill Ferrara (2nd season); Melissa Dunne (1st season)
- Home arena: Charles E. Smith Center

2014–15 Atlantic 10 women's basketball standings
	Conf.				Overall
Team	W		L	PCT	W		L	PCT
No. 19 George Washington^{†}	15	–	1	.938	29	–	4	.879
Dayton	14	–	2	.875	28	–	7	.800
Duquesne	12	–	4	.750	23	–	11	.676
Fordham	11	–	5	.688	21	–	12	.636
Richmond	9	–	7	.563	19	–	14	.576
Rhode Island	8	–	8	.500	17	–	13	.567
Saint Joseph's	8	–	8	.500	13	–	17	.433
VCU	7	–	9	.438	16	–	14	.533
Saint Louis	7	–	9	.438	15	–	16	.484
St. Bonaventure	5	–	11	.313	15	–	15	.500
La Salle	5	–	11	.313	15	–	16	.484
George Mason	5	–	11	.313	13	–	17	.433
UMass	5	–	11	.313	12	–	18	.400
Davidson	1	–	15	.063	5	–	25	.167
† 2015 A10 Tournament winner As of 30 March 2015; Rankings from AP poll

The 2014–15 George Washington Colonials women's basketball team represented George Washington University during the 2014–15 college basketball season. Jonathan Tsipis resumed the responsibility as head coach for a third consecutive season. The Colonials were members of the Atlantic 10 Conference and played their home games at the Charles E. Smith Center. They finished the season 29–4, 15–1 in A-10 play to win the A-10 regular season title and also won the A-10 Tournament. They received an automatic bid to the NCAA women's tournament where they lost to Gonzaga in the first round.

== 2014–15 media ==
=== George Washington Colonials Sports Network ===
WRGW carried the Colonials games and broadcast them online at GWRadio.com. The A-10 Digital Network also carry all non-televised Colonials home games and most conference road games through RaiseHigh Live.

== Roster ==
2014–15 George Washington Colonials women's basketball team
Players
Coaches

Pos.	#	Name	Height	Year	Previous school	Hometown
G	1	Chakecia Miller	5 ft 7 in (1.7 m)	Sr	Campbell (GA)	San Antonio, TX
G	2	Camila Tapias	5 ft 6 in (1.68 m)	Fr	IMG Academy (FL)	Bogotá, Colombia
F	3	Caira Washington	6 ft 2 in (1.88 m)	So	Georgetown Day School	Brandywine, MD
G	4	Lauren Chase	5 ft 5 in (1.65 m)	Sr	Riverdale Baptist	Bowie, MD
G	5	Aaliyah Brown	5 ft 8 in (1.73 m)	RS Jr	Clear Springs	League City, TX
G	13	Shannon Cranshaw	5 ft 9 in (1.75 m)	So	Father Lopez	Ormond Beach, FL
F	14	DeLacy Anderson	6 ft 1 in (1.85 m)	Jr	Bolingbrook	Bolingbrook, IL
G	15	Mia Farmer	5 ft 8 in (1.73 m)	Fr	Cardinal O'Hara	Philadelphia, PA
G	20	Hannah Schaible	5 ft 9 in (1.75 m)	So	Dr. Phillips	Orlando, FL
G	21	Bria Bourgeois	5 ft 10 in (1.78 m)	Sr	Walton	Marietta, GA
F	22	Jada Matthews	6 ft 0 in (1.83 m)	Fr	Winslow Township	Sicklerville, NJ
G	24	Alexis Chandler	5 ft 8 in (1.73 m)	Jr	Cy-Fair	Cypress, TX
C	25	Kelli Prange	6 ft 5 in (1.96 m)	Fr	Damascus	Damascus, MD
G	34	Brianna Cummings	5 ft 10 in (1.78 m)	Fr	Greater Atlanta Christian	Lawrenceville, GA
F	35	Jonquel Jones	6 ft 4 in (1.93 m)	Jr	Riverdale Baptist (MD)	Freeport, Bahamas

Head coach

- Jonathan Tsipis (North Carolina)

Assistant coach(es)

- Diane Richardson (Frostburg State)
- Bill Ferrara (Florida)
- Melissa Dunne (Temple)

Legend

- (C) Team captain
- (S) Suspended
- (I) Ineligible
- (W) Walk-on
- Injured
- Current redshirt

Roster
Last update: 2014-07-07

== Schedule ==
Date time, TV	Rank^{#}	Opponent^{#}	Result	Record	Site (attendance) city, state
Exhibition
11/09/2014*; 2:00 pm		Virginia Union	W 99–45	–	Charles E. Smith Center (309); Washington, D.C.
Regular Season
11/14/2014*; 7:00 pm, ESPN3		at Florida Gulf Coast	L 75–88	0–1	Alico Arena (1,879); Fort Myers, FL
11/17/2014*; 5:00 pm		at American	W 63–52	1–1	Bender Arena (526); Washington, D.C.
11/19/2014*; 7:00 pm		Bowie State	W 88–45	2–1	Charles E. Smith Center (310); Washington, D.C.
11/22/2014*; 3:30 pm, CSN+		No. 9 Maryland	L 65–75	2–2	Charles E. Smith Center (1,395); Washington, D.C.
11/24/2014*; 12:00 pm		Grambling State	W 89–51	3–2	Charles E. Smith Center (188); Washington, D.C.
11/28/2014*; 1:00 pm		vs. NC State; Junkanoo Jam Freeport Division semifinals	W 74–66	4–2	St. Georges High School (N/A); Grand Bahama Island
11/29/2014*; 3:15 pm		vs. Purdue; Junkanoo Jam Freeport Division championship	W 79–59	5–2	St. Georges High School (429); Grand Bahama Island
12/06/2014*; 2:00 pm		Fresno State	W 73–64	6–2	Charles E. Smith Center (551); Washington, D.C.
12/09/2014*; 7:00 pm, CSN+		Georgetown	W 72–60	7–2	Charles E. Smith Center (508); Washington, D.C.
12/15/2014*; 7:00 pm		Memphis	W 63–44	8–2	Charles E. Smith Center (421); Washington, D.C.
12/21/2014*; 12:00 pm		Saint Mary's	W 70–52	9–2	Charles E. Smith Center (452); Washington, D.C.
12/28/2014*; 2:00 pm		at Loyola (MD)	W 72–49	10–2	Reitz Arena (209); Baltimore, MD
12/31/2014*; 1:00 pm		at Towson	W 82–48	11–2	SECU Arena (445); Towson, MD
01/04/2015; 3:30 pm, ESPNU		at Dayton	W 69–66	12–2 (1–0)	UD Arena (2,534); Dayton, OH
01/07/2015; 7:00 pm		Saint Joseph's	W 83–69	13–2 (2–0)	Charles E. Smith Center (522); Washington, D.C.
01/10/2015; 2:00 pm		Richmond	W 77–67	14–2 (3–0)	Charles E. Smith Center (530); Washington, D.C.
01/15/2015; 7:00 pm		at Rhode Island	W 59–49	15–2 (4–0)	Ryan Center (319); Kingston, RI
01/18/2015; 2:00 pm, CBSSN		at Massachusetts	W 69–54	16–2 (5–0)	Mullins Center (381); Amherst, MA
01/21/2015; 7:00 pm		Duquesne	W 83–56	17–2 (6–0)	Charles E. Smith Center (494); Washington, D.C.
01/24/2015; 1:00 pm		at La Salle	W 67–48	18–2 (7–0)	Tom Gola Arena (247); Philadelphia, PA
01/31/2015; 2:00 pm		at George Mason	W 87–52	19–2 (8–0)	Patriot Center (1,807); Fairfax, VA
02/05/2015; 11:00 am, ASN	No. 24	Davidson	W 52–35	20–2 (9–0)	Charles E. Smith Center (2,120); Washington, D.C.
02/08/2015; 12:00 pm, CBSSN	No. 24	Dayton	W 67–56	21–2 (10–0)	Charles E. Smith Center (1,703); Washington, D.C.
02/11/2015; 8:00 pm	No. 20	at Saint Louis	L 61–79	21–3 (10–1)	Chaifetz Arena (311); St. Louis, MO
02/15/2015; 2:00 pm	No. 20	St. Bonaventure	W 70–48	22–3 (11–1)	Charles E. Smith Center (933); Washington, D.C.
02/18/2015; 7:00 pm	No. 24	at VCU	W 65–57	23–3 (12–1)	Siegel Center (413); Richmond, VA
02/21/2015; 2:00 pm	No. 24	Fordham	W 83–65	24–3 (13–1)	Charles E. Smith Center (876); Washington, D.C.
02/26/2015; 7:00 pm	No. 22	at Richmond	W 81–69 ^{OT}	25–3 (14–1)	Robins Center (421); Richmond, VA
03/01/2015; 2:00 pm	No. 22	George Mason	W 80–45	26–3 (15–1)	Charles E. Smith Center (2,197); Washington, D.C.
Atlantic 10 Tournament
03/06/2015; 11:30 am, ASN	No. 21	vs. Saint Louis; Quarterfinals	W 77–63	27–3	Richmond Coliseum (N/A); Richmond, VA
03/07/2015; 11:00 am, CBSSN	No. 21	vs. Fordham; Semifinals	W 72–60	28–3	Richmond Coliseum (N/A); Richmond, VA
03/08/2015; 1:00 pm, ESPNU	No. 21	vs. Dayton; Championship Game	W 75–62	29–3	Richmond Coliseum (N/A); Richmond, VA
NCAA Women's Tournament
03/20/2015*; 7:30 pm, ESPN2	No. 19	vs. Gonzaga; First Round	L 69–82	29–4	Gill Coliseum; Corvallis, OR
*Non-conference game. ^{#}Rankings from AP Poll. (#) Tournament seedings in parentheses. All times are in Eastern Time.

== Rankings ==
2014–15 NCAA Division I women's basketball rankings

Regular season polls
Poll	Pre- Season	Week 2	Week 3	Week 4	Week 5	Week 6	Week 7	Week 8	Week 9	Week 10	Week 11	Week 12	Week 13	Week 14	Week 15	Week 16	Week 17	Week 18	Final
AP	NR	NR	NR	NR	NR	NR	NR	NR	RV	RV	RV	RV	24	20	24	22	21	19	19
Coaches	NR	NR	NR	RV	RV	RV	RV	RV	RV	RV	24	24	23	21	23	21	19	19т	19

Legend
	Increase in ranking
	Decrease in ranking
	No change
(RV)	Received votes
(NR)	Not ranked

== See also ==
- 2014–15 George Washington Colonials men's basketball team
- George Washington Colonials women's basketball
