= 2014–15 Davidson Wildcats women's basketball team =

Intercollegiate basketball season

2014–15 Davidson Wildcats women's basketball
- Conference: Atlantic 10 Conference
- Record: 5–25 (1–15 A-10)
- Head coach: Michele Savage (5th season)
- Assistant coaches: Mary Ciuk (5th season); Jamie Thomatis (5th season); Kira Mowen (5th season)
- Home arena: John M. Belk Arena

2014–15 Atlantic 10 women's basketball standings
	Conf.				Overall
Team	W		L	PCT	W		L	PCT
No. 19 George Washington^{†}	15	–	1	.938	29	–	4	.879
Dayton	14	–	2	.875	28	–	7	.800
Duquesne	12	–	4	.750	23	–	11	.676
Fordham	11	–	5	.688	21	–	12	.636
Richmond	9	–	7	.563	19	–	14	.576
Rhode Island	8	–	8	.500	17	–	13	.567
Saint Joseph's	8	–	8	.500	13	–	17	.433
VCU	7	–	9	.438	16	–	14	.533
Saint Louis	7	–	9	.438	15	–	16	.484
St. Bonaventure	5	–	11	.313	15	–	15	.500
La Salle	5	–	11	.313	15	–	16	.484
George Mason	5	–	11	.313	13	–	17	.433
UMass	5	–	11	.313	12	–	18	.400
Davidson	1	–	15	.063	5	–	25	.167
† 2015 A10 Tournament winner As of 30 March 2015; Rankings from AP poll

The 2014–15 Davidson Wildcats women's basketball team represented Davidson College during the 2014–15 college basketball season. Michele Savage resumed the responsibility as head coach for a fifth consecutive season. The Wildcats were new members of the Atlantic 10 Conference and play their home games at the John M. Belk Arena. They finished the season 5–25, 1–15 in A-10 play to finish in last place. They lost in the first round of the A-10 women's tournament to La Salle.

== 2014–15 media ==
=== Davidson Wildcats Sports Network ===
Select Wildcats games were broadcast on Teamline with Derek Smith and Leslie Urban hosting and commenting. Most home games were also featured on the A-10 Digital Network. Select games were televised.

== Roster ==
2014–15 Davidson Wildcats women's basketball team
Players
Coaches

Pos.	#	Name	Height	Year	Previous school	Hometown
G	1	Kayla Seymour	5 ft 9 in (1.75 m)	Jr	Panther Creek	Raleigh, NC
G	2	Saadia Timpton	5 ft 8 in (1.73 m)	Fr	Myers Park	Charlotte, NC
G	3	Shannon Eriksson	5 ft 7 in (1.7 m)	Sr	Thomas Jefferson Science Tech	Fairfax, VA
F	10	Hannah Early	6 ft 1 in (1.85 m)	Sr	Hopewell	Huntersville, NC
G	11	Lillan McCabe	6 ft 0 in (1.83 m)	Sr	Rye	Rye, NY
G	13	Diona Johnson	5 ft 9 in (1.75 m)	Fr	Gates Chili	Rochester, NY
C	14	Mellissa Giegerich	6 ft 6 in (1.98 m)	Sr	Tabor Academy	Wolfeboro, NH
G	22	Alexandra Long	5 ft 10 in (1.78 m)	Jr	Flint Hill	Great Falls, VA
F	23	Dakota Dukes	6 ft 0 in (1.83 m)	Jr	Cary Christian School	Raleigh, NC
F	24	Rachel Piles	6 ft 3 in (1.91 m)	So	Allen	Allen, TX
G	32	Melanie Ransom	5 ft 9 in (1.75 m)	So	Marian Catholic	Lansing, IL
F	42	Jordan Woods	6 ft 2 in (1.88 m)	So	Rancocas Valley	Mount Holly, NJ
F	44	Mackenzie Latt	6 ft 1 in (1.85 m)	RS Fr	Richland Gull Lake	Kalamazoo, MI

Head coach

- Michele Savage (Northwestern)

Assistant coach(es)

- Mary Ciuk (Florida)
- Jamie Thomatis (Middle Tennessee)
- Kira Mowen (Youngstown State)

Legend

- (C) Team captain
- (S) Suspended
- (I) Ineligible
- (W) Walk-on
- Injured
- Current redshirt

Roster
Last update: 2014-07-06

== Schedule ==
Date time, TV	Rank^{#}	Opponent^{#}	Result	Record	Site (attendance) city, state
Exhibition
10/30/2014*; 7:00 pm		Catawba	W 83–51	–	John M. Belk Arena (N/A); Davidson, NC
11/08/2014*; 5:00 pm		Queens	W 83–50	–	John M. Belk Arena (N/A); Davidson, NC
Regular Season
11/14/2014*; 6:00 pm		at Furman	L 60–67	0–1	Timmons Arena (1,116); Greenville, SC
11/17/2014*; 7:00 pm		USC	L 64–99	0–2	John M. Belk Arena (583); Davidson, NC
11/20/2014*; 7:00 pm		at Gardner–Webb	W 68–67	1–2	Paul Porter Arena (290); Boiling Springs, NC
11/23/2014*; 2:00 pm		Mount St. Mary's	W 67–62	2–2	John M. Belk Arena (502); Davidson, NC
11/25/2014*; 2:00 pm		High Point	W 76–57	3–2	John M. Belk Arena (327); Davidson, NC
11/30/2014*; 1:00 pm		at No. 21 Rutgers	L 44–100	3–3	Louis Brown Athletic Center (1,513); Piscataway, NJ
12/02/2014*; 7:00 pm		North Carolina A&T	L 57–62 ^{OT}	3–4	John M. Belk Arena (322); Davidson, NC
12/07/2014*; 2:00 pm		James Madison	L 57–73	3–5	John M. Belk Arena (372); Davidson, NC
12/13/2014*; 7:00 pm		at Winthrop	L 60–75	3–6	Winthrop Coliseum (346); Rock Hill, SC
12/19/2014*; 7:00 pm		at NC State	L 66–82	3–7	Reynolds Coliseum (1,275); Raleigh, NC
12/21/2014*; 2:00 pm		at Charlotte	L 51–86	3–8	Dale F. Halton Arena (1,089); Charlotte, NC
12/28/2014*; 2:30 pm		at Virginia; Virginia Holiday Tournament	W 67–57	4–8	John Paul Jones Arena (3,392); Charlottesville, VA
12/29/2014*; 4:30 pm		vs. Miami (OH); Virginia Holiday Tournament	L 58–59	4–9	John Paul Jones Arena (N/A); Charlottesville, VA
01/04/2015; 2:00 pm		La Salle	L 54–63	4–10 (0–1)	John M. Belk Arena (506); Davidson, NC
01/07/2015; 12:00 pm		Dayton	L 51–67	4–11 (0–2)	John M. Belk Arena (783); Davidson, NC
01/11/2015; 2:00 pm		Rhode Island	L 62–71	4–12 (0–3)	John M. Belk Arena (427); Davidson, NC
01/15/2015; 7:00 pm		at VCU	L 53–62	4–13 (0–4)	Siegel Center (572); Richmond, VA
01/18/2015; 2:00 pm		at Saint Louis	W 53–50	5–13 (1–4)	Chaifetz Arena (319); St. Louis, MO
01/21/2015; 7:00 pm		Richmond	L 48–56	5–14 (1–5)	John M. Belk Arena (464); Davidson, NC
01/24/2015; 2:00 pm		at Duquesne	L 47–83	5–15 (1–6)	Palumbo Center (675); Pittsburgh, PA
01/28/2015; 7:00 pm		Fordham	L 45–66	5–16 (1–7)	John M. Belk Arena (339); Davidson, NC
01/31/2015; 2:00 pm		Saint Joseph's	L 52–57	5–17 (1–8)	John M. Belk Arena (671); Davidson, NC
02/05/2015; 11:00 am, ASN		at No. 24 George Washington	L 35–52	5–18 (1–9)	Charles E. Smith Center (2,120); Washington, D.C.
02/08/2015; 2:00 pm		at George Mason	L 60–63	5–19 (1–10)	Patriot Center (1,223); Fairfax, VA
02/14/2015; 2:00 pm		Saint Louis	L 59–77	5–20 (1–11)	John M. Belk Arena (753); Davidson, NC
02/18/2015; 7:00 pm		at Massachusetts	L 49–60	5–21 (1–12)	Mullins Center (358); Amherst, MA
02/21/2015; 1:00 pm		at St. Bonaventure	L 56–72	5–22 (1–13)	Reilly Center (917); Olean, NY
02/25/2015; 7:00 pm		VCU	L 63–66	5–23 (1–14)	John M. Belk Arena (413); Davidson, NC
03/01/2015; 2:00 pm		at Fordham	L 46–54	5–24 (1–15)	Rose Hill Gymnasium (741); Bronx, NY
Atlantic 10 Tournament
03/04/2015; 7:00 pm		vs. La Salle; First Round	L 63–74	5–25	Richmond Coliseum (765); Richmond, VA
*Non-conference game. ^{#}Rankings from AP Poll. (#) Tournament seedings in parentheses. All times are in Eastern Time.

== Rankings ==
2014–15 NCAA Division I women's basketball rankings

+ Regular season polls	Poll	Pre- Season	Week 2	Week 3	Week 4	Week 5	Week 6	Week 7	Week 8	Week 9	Week 10	Week 11	Week 12	Week 13	Week 14	Week 15	Week 16	Week 17	Week 18	Final
AP	NR	NR	NR	NR	NR	NR	NR	NR	NR	NR	NR	NR	NR	NR	NR	NR	NR	NR	NR	
Coaches	NR	NR	NR	NR	NR	NR	NR	NR	NR	NR	NR	NR	NR	NR	NR	NR	NR	NR	NR	

Legend
	Increase in ranking
	Decrease in ranking
	No change
(RV)	Received votes
(NR)	Not ranked

== See also ==
- 2014–15 Davidson Wildcats men's basketball team
- Davidson Wildcats women's basketball
