= 2014–15 St. Bonaventure Bonnies women's basketball team =

Intercollegiate basketball season

2014–15 St. Bonaventure Bonnies women's basketball

Brown Classic Champions
- Conference: Atlantic 10 Conference
- Record: 15–15 (5–11 A-10)
- Head coach: Jim Crowley (15th season)
- Associate head coach: Kate Achter (2nd season)
- Assistant coaches: Andrea Doneth (3rd season); Tiara Johnson (2nd season)
- Home arena: Reilly Center

2014–15 Atlantic 10 women's basketball standings
	Conf.				Overall
Team	W		L	PCT	W		L	PCT
No. 19 George Washington^{†}	15	–	1	.938	29	–	4	.879
Dayton	14	–	2	.875	28	–	7	.800
Duquesne	12	–	4	.750	23	–	11	.676
Fordham	11	–	5	.688	21	–	12	.636
Richmond	9	–	7	.563	19	–	14	.576
Rhode Island	8	–	8	.500	17	–	13	.567
Saint Joseph's	8	–	8	.500	13	–	17	.433
VCU	7	–	9	.438	16	–	14	.533
Saint Louis	7	–	9	.438	15	–	16	.484
St. Bonaventure	5	–	11	.313	15	–	15	.500
La Salle	5	–	11	.313	15	–	16	.484
George Mason	5	–	11	.313	13	–	17	.433
UMass	5	–	11	.313	12	–	18	.400
Davidson	1	–	15	.063	5	–	25	.167
† 2015 A10 Tournament winner As of 30 March 2015; Rankings from AP poll

The 2014–15 St. Bonaventure Bonnies women's basketball team represented the St. Bonaventure University during the 2014–15 college basketball season. Jim Crowley assumes the responsibility as head coach for his fifteenth season. The Bonnies were members of the Atlantic 10 Conference and play their home games at the Reilly Center. They finished the season 15–15, 5–11 in A-10 play to finish in a four-way tie for tenth place. They lost in the first round in the A-10 women's tournament to UMass.

== 2014–15 media ==
All non-televised Bonnies home games will air on the A-10 Digital Network. On radio, WGWE acquired broadcast rights to the team for the 2014–15 season.

== Roster ==
2014–15 St. Bonaventure Bonnies women's basketball team
Players
Coaches

Pos.	#	Name	Height	Year	Previous school	Hometown
G	2	Mariah Ruff	5 ft 9 in (1.75 m)	Fr	Oneonta	Oneonta, N.Y.
G	4	Kelcie Romach	5 ft 11 in (1.8 m)	Jr	Ottawa Township	Ottawa, Ill.
F	11	Hannah Little	6 ft 1 in (1.85 m)	Jr	Auburn Hills Avondale	Rochester Hills, Mich.
G	12	Ashley Zahn	5 ft 10 in (1.78 m)	Sr	Canandaigua Academy	Canandaigua, N.Y.
G/F	13	Taryne Shull	6 ft 0 in (1.83 m)	Fr	Mount Pleasant	Mount Pleasant, Iowa
F	14	Gabrielle Richmond	6 ft 1 in (1.85 m)	So	Morgan Park	Chicago, Ill.
G	21	Nyla Rueter	5 ft 9 in (1.75 m)	Jr	Hagerstown	Hagerstown, Ind.
G	22	Imani Outlaw	5 ft 8 in (1.73 m)	So	Sycamore HS	Cincinnati, Ohio
F	23	Matea Britvar	6 ft 1 in (1.85 m)	Fr	Dr. Phillips	Orlando, Fla.
F	32	Miranda Drummond	6 ft 1 in (1.85 m)	Fr	Harpursville	Binghamton, N.Y.
G	33	Emily Michael	5 ft 8 in (1.73 m)	Jr	Chaminade Julienne	Clayton, Ohio
F	42	Katie Healy	6 ft 1 in (1.85 m)	Jr	Lancaster HS	Lancaster, N.Y.

Head coach

- Jim Crowley (Keuka)

Assistant coach(es)

- Kate Achter (Bowling Green)
- Andrea Doneth (St. Bonaventure)
- Tiara Johnson (St. Bonaventure)

Legend

- (C) Team captain
- (S) Suspended
- (I) Ineligible
- (W) Walk-on
- Injured
- Current redshirt

Roster
Last update: 2014-07-31

== Schedule ==
Date time, TV	Rank^{#}	Opponent^{#}	Result	Record	Site (attendance) city, state
Exhibition
11/08/2014*; 2:00 pm		Edinboro	W 61–51	–	Reilly Center (N/A); Olean, NY
Regular Season
11/14/2014*; 7:00 pm		Canisius	W 62–46	1–0	Reilly Center (1,052); Olean, NY
11/16/2014*; 2:00 pm		at James Madison	L 43–76	1–1	JMU Convocation Center (2,042); Harrisonburg, VA
11/20/2014*; 7:00 pm		at Toledo	L 58–64	1–2	Savage Arena (3,551); Toledo, OH
11/22/2014*; 7:00 pm, ESPN3		at Detroit	W 68–56	2–2	Calihan Hall (451); Detroit, MI
11/25/2014*; 7:00 pm		at Penn State	W 56–54	3–2	Bryce Jordan Center (6,703); University Park, PA
11/30/2014*; 1:00 pm		Binghamton	W 72–54	4–2	Reilly Center (408); Olean, NY
12/02/2014*; 7:00 pm		Colgate	W 65–49	5–2	Reilly Center (378); Olean, NY
12/06/2014*; 2:00 pm		vs. Drexel; Brown Classic semifinals	W 43–32	6–2	Pizzitola Sports Center (174); Providence, RI
12/07/2014*; 4:00 pm		at Brown; Brown Classic championship	W 58–56	7–2	Pizzitola Sports Center (154); Providence, RI
12/15/2014*; 7:00 pm, ESPN3		at Buffalo	L 44–51	7–3	Alumni Arena (1,058); Buffalo, NY
12/17/2014*; 7:00 pm		UNC Greensboro	W 78–60	8–3	Reilly Center (473); Olean, NY
12/20/2014*; 1:00 pm, TWCSC		at Niagara	W 72–60	9–3	Gallagher Center (327); Lewiston, NY
12/22/2014*; 2:00 pm		at Georgetown	W 70–64	10–3	McDonough Gymnasium (203); Washington, D.C.
01/03/2015; 1:00 pm		Massachusetts	W 65–53	11–3 (1–0)	Reilly Center (646); Olean, NY
01/07/2015; 7:00 pm		at Richmond	L 61–67	11–4 (1–1)	Robins Center (381); Richmond, VA
01/11/2015; 4:00 pm, NBCSN		Fordham	L 62–72	11–5 (1–2)	Reilly Center (769); Olean, NY
01/14/2015; 7:00 pm		at George Mason	L 55–68 ^{OT}	11–6 (1–3)	Patriot Center (349); Fairfax, VA
01/18/2015; 5:00 pm, NBCSN		Dayton	L 70–86	11–7 (1–4)	Reilly Center (1,040); Olean, NY
01/21/2015; 7:00 pm		VCU	L 51–61	11–8 (1–5)	Reilly Center (819); Olean, NY
01/24/2015; 2:00 pm		at Saint Joseph's	L 48–66	11–9 (1–6)	Hagan Arena (1,086); Philadelphia, PA
01/28/2015; 7:00 pm		Duquesne	L 63–76	11–10 (1–7)	Reilly Center (803); Olean, NY
01/31/2015; 2:00 pm		at Massachusetts	W 77–57	12–10 (2–7)	Mullins Center (592); Amherst, MA
02/05/2015; 7:00 pm, SNY		at Fordham	L 51–54	12–11 (2–8)	Rose Hill Gymnasium (827); Bronx, NY
02/08/2015; 1:00 pm		Rhode Island	W 73–59	13–11 (3–8)	Reilly Center (826); Olean, NY
02/15/2015; 2:00 pm		at No. 20 George Washington	L 48–70	13–12 (3–9)	Charles E. Smith Center (933); Washington, D.C.
02/18/2015; 8:00 pm		at Saint Louis	W 57–55	14–12 (4–9)	Chaifetz Arena (371); St. Louis, MO
02/21/2015; 1:00 pm		Davidson	W 72–56	15–12 (5–9)	Reilly Center (917); Olean, NY
02/25/2015; 7:00 pm		La Salle	L 53–66	15–13 (5–10)	Reilly Center (776); Olean, NY
03/01/2015; 2:00 pm		at Duquesne	L 43–51	15–14 (5–11)	Palumbo Center (621); Pittsburgh, PA
Atlantic 10 Tournament
03/04/2015; 4:30 pm		vs. Massachusetts; First Round	L 49–55	15–15	Richmond Coliseum (N/A); Richmond, VA
*Non-conference game. ^{#}Rankings from AP Poll. (#) Tournament seedings in parentheses. All times are in Eastern Time.

== Rankings ==
2014–15 NCAA Division I women's basketball rankings

Regular season polls
Poll	Pre- Season	Week 2	Week 3	Week 4	Week 5	Week 6	Week 7	Week 8	Week 9	Week 10	Week 11	Week 12	Week 13	Week 14	Week 15	Week 16	Week 17	Week 18	Final
AP	NR	NR	NR	NR	NR	NR	NR	NR	NR	NR	NR	NR	NR	NR	NR	NR	NR	NR	NR
Coaches	NR	NR	NR	NR	NR	NR	NR	NR	NR	NR	NR	NR	NR	NR	NR	NR	NR	NR	NR

Legend
	Increase in ranking
	Decrease in ranking
	No change
(RV)	Received votes
(NR)	Not ranked

== See also ==
- 2014–15 St. Bonaventure Bonnies men's basketball team
- St. Bonaventure Bonnies women's basketball
