= 2014–15 La Salle Explorers women's basketball team =

Intercollegiate basketball season

2014–15 La Salle Explorers women's basketball
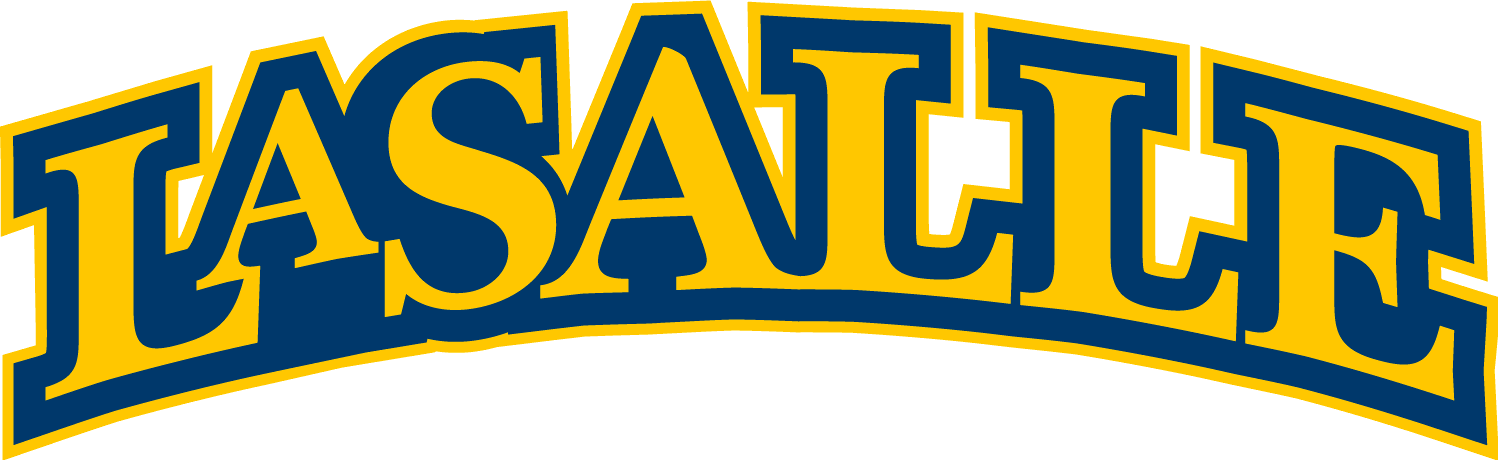
- Conference: Atlantic 10 Conference
- Record: 15–16 (5–11 A-10)
- Head coach: Jeff Williams (5th season)
- Assistant coaches: Ervin Monier (5th season); Shayla Scott (4th season); Morra Gill (3rd season)
- Home arena: Tom Gola Arena

2014–15 Atlantic 10 women's basketball standings
	Conf.				Overall
Team	W		L	PCT	W		L	PCT
No. 19 George Washington^{†}	15	–	1	.938	29	–	4	.879
Dayton	14	–	2	.875	28	–	7	.800
Duquesne	12	–	4	.750	23	–	11	.676
Fordham	11	–	5	.688	21	–	12	.636
Richmond	9	–	7	.563	19	–	14	.576
Rhode Island	8	–	8	.500	17	–	13	.567
Saint Joseph's	8	–	8	.500	13	–	17	.433
VCU	7	–	9	.438	16	–	14	.533
Saint Louis	7	–	9	.438	15	–	16	.484
St. Bonaventure	5	–	11	.313	15	–	15	.500
La Salle	5	–	11	.313	15	–	16	.484
George Mason	5	–	11	.313	13	–	17	.433
UMass	5	–	11	.313	12	–	18	.400
Davidson	1	–	15	.063	5	–	25	.167
† 2015 A10 Tournament winner As of 30 March 2015; Rankings from AP poll

The 2014–15 La Salle Explorers women's basketball team represented La Salle University during the 2014–15 college basketball season. Jeff Williams resumed the responsibility as head coach for a fifth consecutive season. The Explorers were members of the Atlantic 10 Conference and play their home games at the Tom Gola Arena. They finished the season 15–16, 5–11 in A-10 play to finish in a four way tie for tenth place. They advanced to the second round of the A-10 women's tournament, where they lost to Rhode Island.

== 2014–15 media ==
=== La Salle Explorers Sports Network ===
Select Explorers games will be broadcast online by the La Salle Portal. The A-10 Digital Network will carry all non-televised Explorers home games and most conference road games.

== 2014–15 Roster ==
2014–15 La Salle Explorers women's basketball team
Players
Coaches

Pos.	#	Name	Height	Year	Previous school	Hometown
F	2	Siobhan Beslow	5 ft 11 in (1.8 m)	RS Jr	Westfield	Norfolk, Va.
G	3	Khristin Lee	5 ft 9 in (1.75 m)	GS	Alabama	Birmingham, Ala.
G	4	Jordan Williams	5 ft 11 in (1.8 m)	Fr	South Grand Prairie	Grand Prairie, Texas
G	11	Jasmine Alston	5 ft 9 in (1.75 m)	So	Bishop Loughlin	Long Island City, N.Y.
G/F	12	Iyonna Crenshaw	6 ft 0 in (1.83 m)	Fr	Neptune	Neptune, N.J.
F	13	Indigo Dickens	6 ft 2 in (1.88 m)	Sr	Wilde Lake	Washington, D.C.
G	14	Alicia Cropper	5 ft 7 in (1.7 m)	RS Sr	Providence	Brooklyn, N.Y.
G/F	21	Amy Griffin	6 ft 1 in (1.85 m)	Fr	Southwest Atlanta Christian	Atlanta, Ga.
F	22	Deja Bullock	6 ft 0 in (1.83 m)	So	Triton	Magnolia, N.J.
F/C	31	Ebony Wells	6 ft 2 in (1.88 m)	RS Jr	Florida State/Chipola CC	Grovetown, Ga.
F	34	Micahya Owens	5 ft 11 in (1.8 m)	So	Willingboro	Willingboro, N.J.
F	44	Ashanti Freeland	6 ft 3 in (1.91 m)	Fr	Gwynn Park	Brandywine, Md.
F	55	Lisa Mintzer	6 ft 4 in (1.93 m)	So	Cardinal O'Hara	Havertown, Pa.

Head coach

Jeff Williams (Howard)

Assistant coach(es)

Ervin Monier (St. Mary's (TX))
Shayla Scott (Pittsburgh)
Morra Gill (Dillard)

Legend

- (C) Team captain
- (S) Suspended
- (I) Ineligible
- (W) Walk-on
- Injured
- Current redshirt

Roster
Last update: 2014-09-14

== Schedule ==
Date time, TV	Rank^{#}	Opponent^{#}	Result	Record	Site (attendance) city, state
Regular Season
11/14/2014*; 4:30 pm		at Temple	L 72–75	0–1	Liacouras Center (N/A); Philadelphia, PA
11/19/2014*; 7:00 pm		at Penn	L 29–57	0–2	Palestra (492); Philadelphia, PA
11/22/2014*; 4:00 pm		Howard	W 65–64	1–2	Tom Gola Arena (275); Philadelphia, PA
11/25/2014*; 12:00 pm		Manhattan	W 61–48	2–2	Tom Gola Arena (748); Philadelphia, PA
11/28/2014*; 2:00 pm		at LIU Brooklyn; LaGuardia Turkey Classic	W 71–66	3–2	Steinberg Wellness Center (547); Brooklyn, NY
11/29/2014*; 4:30 pm		vs. Towson; LaGuardia Turkey Classic	W 62–49	4–2	Steinberg Wellness Center (N/A); Brooklyn, NY
12/03/2014*; 7:00 pm		at Robert Morris	W 75–61	5–2	Charles L. Sewall Center (486); Moon Township, PA
12/06/2014*; 1:00 pm		William & Mary	W 78–71	6–2	Tom Gola Arena (202); Philadelphia, PA
12/14/2014*; 7:30 pm		at Villanova	L 36–70	6–3	The Pavilion (409); Villanova, PA
12/19/2014*; 7:00 pm		vs. Ohio; Holiday & Hoops Classic	L 63–74	6–4	GSU Sports Arena (442); Atlanta, GA
12/20/2014*; 6:00 pm		at Georgia State; Holiday & Hoops Classic	W 76–68	7–4	GSU Sports Arena (502); Atlanta, GA
12/28/2014*; 1:00 pm		Fairfield	W 73–59	8–4	Tom Gola Arena (234); Philadelphia, PA
12/30/2014*; 2:00 pm		UMBC	W 65–62	9–4	Tom Gola Arena (190); Philadelphia, PA
01/04/2015; 2:00 pm		at Davidson	W 63–54	10–4 (1–0)	John M. Belk Arena (506); Davidson, NC
01/08/2015; 7:00 pm		Fordham	L 59–70	10–5 (1–1)	Tom Gola Arena (573); Philadelphia, PA
01/11/2015; 1:00 pm		George Mason	L 71–73	10–6 (1–2)	Tom Gola Arena (212); Philadelphia, PA
01/15/2015; 7:00 pm		at Massachusetts	L 68–71	10–7 (1–3)	Mullins Center (360); Amherst, MA
01/18/2015; 2:00 pm		at Rhode Island	L 54–55 ^{OT}	10–8 (1–4)	Ryan Center (933); Kingston, RI
01/21/2015; 7:00 pm		Saint Louis	L 47–76	10–9 (1–5)	Tom Gola Arena (227); Philadelphia, PA
01/24/2015; 1:00 pm		George Washington	L 48–67	10–10 (1–6)	Tom Gola Arena (247); Philadelphia, PA
01/31/2015; 7:00 pm		at VCU	W 74–65	11–10 (2–6)	Siegel Center (759); Richmond, VA
02/04/2015; 7:00 pm		at Saint Joseph's	L 64–70	11–11 (2–7)	Hagan Arena (651); Philadelphia, PA
02/07/2015; 1:00 pm		Massachusetts	W 71–69	12–11 (3–7)	Tom Gola Arena (221); Philadelphia, PA
02/11/2015; 7:00 pm		Duquesne	L 66–72	12–12 (3–8)	Tom Gola Arena (266); Philadelphia, PA
02/14/2015; 4:00 pm		at Richmond	L 60–72	12–13 (3–9)	Robins Center (561); Richmond, VA
02/19/2015; 7:00 pm		Rhode Island	W 47–45	13–13 (4–9)	Tom Gola Arena (305); Philadelphia, PA
02/22/2015; 4:00 pm		at Dayton	L 49–91	13–14 (4–10)	UD Arena (2,837); Dayton, OH
02/25/2015; 7:00 pm		at St. Bonaventure	W 66–53	14–14 (5–10)	Reilly Center (766); Olean, NY
03/01/2015; 1:00 pm		Saint Joseph's	L 55–67	14–15 (5–11)	Tom Gola Arena (643); Philadelphia, PA
Atlantic 10 Tournament
03/04/2015; 7:00 pm		vs. Davidson; First Round	W 74–63	15–15	Richmond Coliseum (765); Richmond, VA
03/05/2015; 7:00 pm		vs. Rhode Island; Second Round	L 60–65	15–16	Richmond Coliseum (849); Richmond, VA
*Non-conference game. ^{#}Rankings from AP Poll. (#) Tournament seedings in parentheses. All times are in Eastern Time.

== Rankings ==
2014–15 NCAA Division I women's basketball rankings

+ Regular season polls	Poll	Pre- Season	Week 2	Week 3	Week 4	Week 5	Week 6	Week 7	Week 8	Week 9	Week 10	Week 11	Week 12	Week 13	Week 14	Week 15	Week 16	Week 17	Week 18	Final
AP	NR	NR	NR	NR	NR	NR	NR	NR	NR	NR	NR	NR	NR	NR	NR	NR	NR	NR	NR	
Coaches	NR	NR	NR	NR	NR	NR	NR	NR	NR	NR	NR	NR	NR	NR	NR	NR	NR	NR	NR	

Legend
	Increase in ranking
	Decrease in ranking
	No change
(RV)	Received votes
(NR)	Not ranked

== See also ==
- 2014–15 La Salle Explorers men's basketball team
- La Salle Explorers women's basketball
