= 2014–15 UMass Minutewomen basketball team =

Intercollegiate basketball season

2014–15 UMass Minutewomen basketball
- Conference: Atlantic 10 Conference
- Record: 12–18 (5–11 A-10)
- Head coach: Sharon Dawley (5th season)
- Assistant coaches: Jen MacAulay (5th season); Yolanda Griffith (1st season); Chris Wielgus (2nd season)
- Home arena: William D. Mullins Memorial Center

2014–15 Atlantic 10 women's basketball standings
	Conf.				Overall
Team	W		L	PCT	W		L	PCT
No. 19 George Washington^{†}	15	–	1	.938	29	–	4	.879
Dayton	14	–	2	.875	28	–	7	.800
Duquesne	12	–	4	.750	23	–	11	.676
Fordham	11	–	5	.688	21	–	12	.636
Richmond	9	–	7	.563	19	–	14	.576
Rhode Island	8	–	8	.500	17	–	13	.567
Saint Joseph's	8	–	8	.500	13	–	17	.433
VCU	7	–	9	.438	16	–	14	.533
Saint Louis	7	–	9	.438	15	–	16	.484
St. Bonaventure	5	–	11	.313	15	–	15	.500
La Salle	5	–	11	.313	15	–	16	.484
George Mason	5	–	11	.313	13	–	17	.433
UMass	5	–	11	.313	12	–	18	.400
Davidson	1	–	15	.063	5	–	25	.167
† 2015 A10 Tournament winner As of 30 March 2015; Rankings from AP poll

The 2014–15 UMass Minutewomen basketball team represented the University of Massachusetts Amherst during the 2014–15 college basketball season. Sharon Dawley assumed the responsibility as head coach for her fifth season. The Minutewomen were members of the Atlantic 10 Conference and played their home games at the William D. Mullins Memorial Center. They finished the season 12–18, 5–11 in A-10 play to finish in a four way tie for tenth place. They advanced to the second round of the A-10 women's tournament, where they lost to Richmond.

== 2014–15 media ==
All non-televised Minutewomen home games and conference road games will stream on the A-10 Digital Network. WMUA will carry Minutewomen games with Cody Chrusciel on the call.

== 2014–15 Roster ==
2014–15 UMass Minutewomen women's basketball team
Players
Coaches

Pos.	#	Name	Height	Year	Previous school	Hometown
G	15	Cierra Dillard	5 ft 9 in (1.75 m)	Fr	Gates Chili	Rochester, N.Y.
G	2	Amber Dillon	5 ft 2 in (1.57 m)	RS Jr	Brookline	Jamaica Plain, Mass.
F/C	31	Kymber Hill	6 ft 2 in (1.88 m)	So	Althoff Catholic	Belleville, Ill.
G	5	Adriana Jordan	5 ft 10 in (1.78 m)	Jr	Port Huron	Port Huron, Mich.
F	32	Alyssa Lawrence	6 ft 1 in (1.85 m)	RS Fr	The Ursuline School	New Rochelle, N.Y.
G	25	Leah McDerment	5 ft 10 in (1.78 m)	Fr	Priestnall School	Stockport, England
G	24	Emily Mital	5 ft 8 in (1.73 m)	Sr	Frisco Liberty	Frisco, Texas
F/C	0	Maggie Mulligan	6 ft 2 in (1.88 m)	Fr	Boston Latin School	Boston, Mass.
F	4	Kim Pierre-Louis	6 ft 0 in (1.83 m)	Sr	St. Paul Catholic	Ottawa, Ontario
F	11	Ciara Rosten	6 ft 2 in (1.88 m)	Fr	Maryvale	Cheektowaga, N.Y.
G	21	Victoria Stewart	5 ft 7 in (1.7 m)	Jr	Amherst-Pelham Regional	Amherst, Mass.
G	3	Alyx Stiff	5 ft 9 in (1.75 m)	So	Quest Preparatory Academy	Las Vegas, Nev.
F	14	Paula Tarnachowicz	6 ft 2 in (1.88 m)	Sr	VII Sportowe Liceum	Gdynia, Poland
G/F	23	Rashida Timbilla	6 ft 1 in (1.85 m)	Jr	John McCrae Secondary School	Ottawa, Ontario

Head coach

Sharon Dawley

Assistant coach(es)

Jen MacAulay
Yolanda Griffith
Chris Wielgus

Legend

- (C) Team captain
- (S) Suspended
- (I) Ineligible
- (W) Walk-on
- Injured
- Current redshirt

Roster
Last update: done

== Schedule ==
Date time, TV	Rank^{#}	Opponent^{#}	Result	Record	Site (attendance) city, state
Non-conference regular season
11/14/2014*; 8:30 pm		at Western Michigan	L 41–63	0–1	University Arena (782); Kalamazoo, MI
11/16/2014*; 1:00 pm		at Central Michigan	L 70–72	0–2	McGuirk Arena (1,307); Mount Pleasant, MI
11/19/2014*; 7:00 pm		Maine	W 68–60	1–2	Mullins Center (356); Amherst, MA
11/21/2014*; 8:00 pm		at North Texas; North Texas Tournament	W 56–46	2–2	The Super Pit (827); Denton, TX
11/23/2014*; 1:00 pm		vs. Florida State; North Texas Tournament	L 47–73	2–3	The Super Pit (573); Denton, TX
11/30/2014*; 2:00 pm		UCF	W 67–62	3–3	Mullins Center (344); Amherst, MA
12/03/2014*; 7:00 pm		Harvard	L 62–75	3–4	Mullins Center (302); Amherst, MA
12/06/2014*; 12:00 pm		American	W 71–61	4–4	Mullins Center (338); Amherst, MA
12/14/2014*; 2:00 pm		Holy Cross	W 72–61	5–4	Mullins Center (311); Amherst, MA
12/19/2014*; 5:00 pm		at Georgia State; Georgia State Tournament	L 66–71	5–5	GSU Sports Arena (386); Atlanta, GA
12/20/2014*; 4:00 pm		vs. Ohio; Georgia State Tournament	L 52–59	5–6	GSU Sports Arena (382); Atlanta, GA
12/28/2014*; 2:00 pm		at Boston University	W 78–57	6–6	Case Gym (277); Boston, MA
Atlantic 10 regular season
01/03/2015; 1:00 pm		at St. Bonaventure	L 53–65	6–7 (0–1)	Reilly Center (646); Olean, NY
01/07/2015; 7:00 pm		Saint Louis	L 67–75	6–8 (0–2)	Mullins Center (321); Amherst, MA
01/10/2015; 2:00 pm		at Saint Joseph's	W 65–47	7–8 (1–2)	Hagan Arena (751); Philadelphia, PA
01/15/2015; 7:00 pm		La Salle	W 71–68	8–8 (2–2)	Mullins Center (360); Amherst, MA
01/18/2015; 2:00 pm, CBSSN		George Washington	L 54–69	8–9 (2–3)	Mullins Center (381); Amherst, MA
01/21/2015; 12:00 pm		at Fordham	L 42–65	8–10 (2–4)	Rose Hill Gymnasium (2,236); Bronx, NY
01/24/2015; 2:00 pm		at Richmond	L 44–64	8–11 (2–5)	Robins Center (520); Richmond, VA
01/31/2015; 2:00 pm		St. Bonaventure	L 57–77	8–12 (2–6)	Mullins Center (592); Amherst, MA
02/04/2015; 7:00 pm		at Rhode Island	L 58–70	8–13 (2–7)	Ryan Center (407); Kingston, RI
02/07/2015; 1:00 pm		at La Salle	L 69–71	8–14 (2–8)	Tom Gola Arena (221); Philadelphia, PA
02/11/2015; 11:45 am		George Mason	W 85–79 ^{OT}	9–14 (3–8)	Mullins Center (1,398); Amherst, MA
02/14/2015; 1:00 pm		Duquesne	L 49–69	9–15 (3–9)	Mullins Center (714); Amherst, MA
02/18/2015; 7:00 pm		Davidson	W 60–49	10–15 (4–9)	Mullins Center (358); Amherst, MA
02/22/2015; 1:00 pm		at VCU	L 43–65	10–16 (4–10)	Siegel Center (939); Richmond, VA
02/26/2015; 7:00 pm		at Dayton	L 60–69	10–17 (4–11)	UD Arena (2,061); Dayton, OH
03/01/2015; 2:00 pm		Rhode Island	W 78–70	11–17 (5–11)	Mullins Center (612); Amherst, MA
Atlantic 10 Tournament
03/04/2015; 4:30 pm		vs. St. Bonaventure; First Round	W 55–49	12–17	Richmond Coliseum (N/A); Richmond, VA
03/05/2015; 2:00 pm		vs. Richmond; Second Round	L 63–67	12–18	Richmond Coliseum (N/A); Richmond, VA
*Non-conference game. ^{#}Rankings from AP Poll. (#) Tournament seedings in parentheses. All times are in Eastern Time.

== Rankings ==
2014–15 NCAA Division I women's basketball rankings

Regular season polls
Poll	Pre- Season	Week 2	Week 3	Week 4	Week 5	Week 6	Week 7	Week 8	Week 9	Week 10	Week 11	Week 12	Week 13	Week 14	Week 15	Week 16	Week 17	Week 18	Final
AP	NR	NR	NR	NR	NR	NR	NR	NR	NR	NR	NR	NR	NR	NR	NR	NR	NR	NR	NR
Coaches	NR	NR	NR	NR	NR	NR	NR	NR	NR	NR	NR	NR	NR	NR	NR	NR	NR	NR	NR

Legend
	Increase in ranking
	Decrease in ranking
	No change
(RV)	Received votes
(NR)	Not ranked

== See also ==
- 2014–15 UMass Minutemen basketball team
