= 2014–15 Duquesne Dukes women's basketball team =

Intercollegiate basketball season

2014–15 Duquesne Dukes women's basketball

Ball State Classic Champions

WNIT, Third Round
- Conference: Atlantic 10 Conference
- Record: 23–10 (12–4 A-10)
- Head coach: Dan Burt (2nd season)
- Assistant coaches: Eddie Benton (2nd season); Matt Schmidt (2nd season); Rachel Wojdowski (2nd season)
- Home arena: Palumbo Center

2014–15 Atlantic 10 women's basketball standings
	Conf.				Overall
Team	W		L	PCT	W		L	PCT
No. 19 George Washington^{†}	15	–	1	.938	29	–	4	.879
Dayton	14	–	2	.875	28	–	7	.800
Duquesne	12	–	4	.750	23	–	11	.676
Fordham	11	–	5	.688	21	–	12	.636
Richmond	9	–	7	.563	19	–	14	.576
Rhode Island	8	–	8	.500	17	–	13	.567
Saint Joseph's	8	–	8	.500	13	–	17	.433
VCU	7	–	9	.438	16	–	14	.533
Saint Louis	7	–	9	.438	15	–	16	.484
St. Bonaventure	5	–	11	.313	15	–	15	.500
La Salle	5	–	11	.313	15	–	16	.484
George Mason	5	–	11	.313	13	–	17	.433
UMass	5	–	11	.313	12	–	18	.400
Davidson	1	–	15	.063	5	–	25	.167
† 2015 A10 Tournament winner As of 30 March 2015; Rankings from AP poll

The 2014–15 Duquesne Dukes women's basketball team represented Duquesne University during the 2014–15 college basketball season. Dan Burt resumed the responsibility as head coach for a 2nd consecutive season. The Dukes are members of the Atlantic 10 Conference and played their home games at the A. J. Palumbo Center. They finished the season 23–11, 12–4 in A-10 play to finish in third place. They advanced to the semifinals of the A-10 women's tournament where they lost to Dayton. They were invited to the Women's National Invitation Tournament where they defeated Youngstown State in the first round, Richmond in the second round before losing to West Virginia in the third round.

== 2014–15 media ==
=== Duquesne Dukes Sports Network ===
All Duquesne Dukes home games and select road games will be broadcast by Red Zone Media with Alex Panormios and Tad Maurey providing the call. Road games not done by Red Zone Media can usually be heard on the home teams radio feed. Most home games will also be featured on the A-10 Digital Network. Select games will be televised.

== 2014–15 Roster ==
2014–15 Duquesne Dukes women's basketball team
Players
Coaches

Pos.	#	Name	Height	Year	Previous school	Hometown
G	2	Deva'Nyar Workman	5 ft 10 in (1.78 m)	Jr	Rading	Reading, Pa.
G	3	Tanesha Sutton	5 ft 10 in (1.78 m)	Fr	Ss. Neumann and Goretti	Philadelphia, Pa.
C	4	Jose-Ann Johnson	6 ft 4 in (1.93 m)	Sr	Father Michael Goetz Secondary	Brampton, Ontario
F	5	Kyasia Duling	6 ft 3 in (1.91 m)	So	New Albany	Zanesville, Ohio
F	15	Amadea Szamosi	6 ft 3 in (1.91 m)	So	Ciszterci Rend Pesi Nagy Lajos Gimnaziuma	Pécs, Hungary
G	21	Erin Waskowiak	5 ft 11 in (1.8 m)	Fr	Bishop Canevin	Pittsburgh, Pa.
G	22	Olivia Bresnahan	5 ft 11 in (1.8 m)	Sr	Butler	Butler, Pa.
G	23	Belma Nurkic	5 ft 8 in (1.73 m)	Sr	Baldwin	Pittsburgh, Pa.
G	32	April Robinson	5 ft 8 in (1.73 m)	Jr	West Springfield	Springfield, Va.
F	35	Tyra Jones	6 ft 0 in (1.83 m)	Fr	Cody	Detroit, Mich.
F	42	Stasia King	6 ft 1 in (1.85 m)	Sr	Harrisburg	Harrisburg, Pa.
G	45	Emilie Gronas	5 ft 7 in (1.7 m)	Jr	Cowley C.C.	Bergen, Norway
G	55	Brianna Thomas	6 ft 0 in (1.83 m)	So	Notre Dame	Ajax, Ontario

Head coach

Dan Burt (West Liberty State)

Assistant coach(es)

Eddie Benton (Vermont)
Matt Schmidt (West Liberty State)
Rachel Wojdowski (NYU)

Legend

- (C) Team captain
- (S) Suspended
- (I) Ineligible
- (W) Walk-on
- Injured
- Current redshirt

Roster
Last update: 2014-09-14

== Schedule ==
Date time, TV	Rank^{#}	Opponent^{#}	Result	Record	Site (attendance) city, state
Regular Season
11/16/2014*; 2:00 pm		Princeton	L 62–79	0–1	Palumbo Center (1,116); Pittsburgh, PA
11/19/2014*; 7:00 pm		No. 23 Syracuse	L 84–90	0–2	Palumbo Center (732); Pittsburgh, PA
11/22/2014*; 2:00 pm, ESPN3		at Green Bay	L 52–84	0–3	Kress Events Center (1,914); Green Bay, WI
11/25/2014*; 7:00 pm		at Howard	W 89–63	1–3	Burr Gymnasium (98); Washington, D.C.
11/29/2014*; 12:00 pm		vs. Jackson State; Ball State Classic semifinals	W 90–72	2–3	Worthen Arena (N/A); Muncie, IN
11/30/2014*; 3:00 pm		at Ball State; Ball State Classic championship	W 82–62	3–3	Worthen Arena (528); Muncie, IN
12/03/2014*; 11:00 am		Kent State	W 86–60	4–3	Palumbo Center (1,352); Pittsburgh, PA
12/07/2014*; 2:00 pm		Pittsburgh; City Game	W 87–77	5–3	Palumbo Center (821); Pittsburgh, PA
12/10/2014*; 7:00 pm, RTPT		at No. 23 West Virginia	L 60–79	5–4	WVU Coliseum (1,322); Morgantown, WV
12/14/2014*; 1:00 pm		at Robert Morris	W 71–57	6–4	Charles L. Sewall Center (319); Moon Township, PA
12/18/2014*; 7:00 pm		Saint Francis (PA)	W 92–52	7–4	Palumbo Center (450); Pittsburgh, PA
12/21/2014*; 2:00 pm		at Providence	L 56–67	7–5	Alumni Hall (324); Providence, RI
12/28/2014*; 2:00 pm		at Lehigh	W 82–75	8–5	Stabler Arena (732); Bethlehem, PA
01/03/2015; 2:00 pm		at Rhode Island	L 61–62	8–6 (0–1)	Ryan Center (366); Kingston, RI
01/08/2015; 7:00 pm		George Mason	W 88–54	9–6 (1–1)	Palumbo Center (319); Pittsburgh, PA
01/11/2015; 2:00 pm		at Dayton	L 67–78	9–7 (1–2)	UD Arena (1,894); Dayton, OH
01/15/2015; 7:00 pm		Saint Louis	W 77–64	10–7 (2–2)	Palumbo Center (519); Pittsburgh, PA
01/18/2015; 4:00 pm, CBSSN		Saint Joseph's	W 63–54	11–7 (3–2)	Palumbo Center (908); Pittsburgh, PA
01/21/2015; 7:00 pm		at George Washington	L 56–83	11–8 (3–3)	Charles E. Smith Center (494); Washington, D.C.
01/24/2015; 2:00 pm		Davidson	W 83–47	12–8 (4–3)	Palumbo Center (675); Pittsburgh, PA
01/28/2015; 7:00 pm		at St. Bonaventure	W 76–63	13–8 (5–3)	Reilly Center (803); Olean, NY
01/31/2015; 2:00 pm		at Fordham	W 56–46	14–8 (6–3)	Rose Hill Gymnasium (421); Bronx, NY
02/07/2015; 2:00 pm		VCU	W 83–47	15–8 (7–3)	Palumbo Center (722); Pittsburgh, PA
02/11/2015; 7:00 pm		at La Salle	W 72–66	16–8 (8–3)	Tom Gola Arena (266); Philadelphia, PA
02/14/2015; 1:00 pm		at Massachusetts	W 69–49	17–8 (9–3)	Mullins Center (714); Amherst, MA
02/18/2015; 7:00 pm		Richmond	W 58–51 ^{OT}	18–8 (10–3)	Palumbo Center (852); Pittsburgh, PA
02/22/2015; 2:00 pm		Rhode Island	W 60–50	19–8 (11–3)	Palumbo Center (750); Pittsburgh, PA
02/25/2015; 7:00 pm		at Saint Joseph's	L 49–60	19–9 (11–4)	Hagan Arena (751); Philadelphia, PA
03/01/2015; 2:00 pm		St. Bonaventure	W 51–43	20–9 (12–4)	Palumbo Center (621); Pittsburgh, PA
Atlantic 10 Tournament
03/06/2015; 7:00 pm, ASN		vs. Rhode Island; Quarterfinals	W 66–53	21–9	Richmond Coliseum (1,692); Richmond, VA
03/07/2015; 1:30 pm, CBSSN		vs. Dayton; Semifinals	L 60–74	21–10	Richmond Coliseum (1,588); Richmond, VA
WNIT
03/19/2015*; 7:00 pm		at Youngstown State; First Round	W 72–54	22–10	Beeghly Center (1,797); Youngstown, OH
03/24/2015*; 7:00 pm		Richmond; Second Round	W 48–47	23–10	Palumbo Center (570); Pittsburgh, PA
03/27/2015*; 7:00 pm		at West Virginia; Third Round	L 39–60	23–11	WVU Coliseum (1,471); Morgantown, WV
*Non-conference game. ^{#}Rankings from AP Poll. (#) Tournament seedings in parentheses. All times are in Eastern Time.

== Rankings ==
2014–15 NCAA Division I women's basketball rankings

+ Regular season polls	Poll	Pre- Season	Week 2	Week 3	Week 4	Week 5	Week 6	Week 7	Week 8	Week 9	Week 10	Week 11	Week 12	Week 13	Week 14	Week 15	Week 16	Week 17	Week 18	Final
AP	NR	NR	NR	NR	NR	NR	NR	NR	NR	NR	NR	NR	NR	NR	NR	NR	NR	NR	NR	
Coaches	NR	NR	NR	NR	NR	NR	NR	NR	NR	NR	NR	NR	NR	NR	NR	NR	NR	NR	NR	

Legend
	Increase in ranking
	Decrease in ranking
	No change
(RV)	Received votes
(NR)	Not ranked

== See also ==
- 2014–15 Duquesne Dukes men's basketball team
- Duquesne Dukes women's basketball
