= 2014–15 Rhode Island Rams women's basketball team =

Intercollegiate basketball season

2014–15 Rhode Island Rams women's basketball
- Conference: Atlantic 10 Conference
- Record: 17–13 (8–8 A-10)
- Head coach: Daynia La-Force (1st season)
- Assistant coaches: Tom Blake (1st season); Timothy Eatman (1st season); Marcus Reilly (3rd season)
- Home arena: Ryan Center

2014–15 Atlantic 10 women's basketball standings
	Conf.				Overall
Team	W		L	PCT	W		L	PCT
No. 19 George Washington^{†}	15	–	1	.938	29	–	4	.879
Dayton	14	–	2	.875	28	–	7	.800
Duquesne	12	–	4	.750	23	–	11	.676
Fordham	11	–	5	.688	21	–	12	.636
Richmond	9	–	7	.563	19	–	14	.576
Rhode Island	8	–	8	.500	17	–	13	.567
Saint Joseph's	8	–	8	.500	13	–	17	.433
VCU	7	–	9	.438	16	–	14	.533
Saint Louis	7	–	9	.438	15	–	16	.484
St. Bonaventure	5	–	11	.313	15	–	15	.500
La Salle	5	–	11	.313	15	–	16	.484
George Mason	5	–	11	.313	13	–	17	.433
UMass	5	–	11	.313	12	–	18	.400
Davidson	1	–	15	.063	5	–	25	.167
† 2015 A10 Tournament winner As of 30 March 2015; Rankings from AP poll

The 2014–15 Rhode Island Rams women's basketball team represented the University of Rhode Island during the 2014–15 college basketball season. Daynia La-Force assumes the responsibility as head coach for her first season. The Rams were members of the Atlantic 10 Conference and played their home games at the Ryan Center. They finished the season 17–13, 8–8 in A-10 play to finish in a tie for sixth place. They advanced to the quarterfinals of the A-10 women's tournament, where they lost to Duquesne.

== 2014–15 media ==
All Rams home games and most conference road games that aren't televised will be shown on the A-10 Digital Network.

== Roster ==
2014–15 Rhode Island Rams women's basketball team
Players
Coaches

Pos.	#	Name	Height	Year	Previous school	Hometown
G	1	Tayra Meléndez	5 ft 11 in (1.8 m)	Jr	The Rivers School	Mattapan, MA
G	3	Charise Wilson	5 ft 5 in (1.65 m)	Fr	St. Anthony's	West Babylon, NY
G	12	Morgan Johnson	5 ft 10 in (1.78 m)	RS Fr	Keystone	Knox, PA
G	13	Kallie Banker	5 ft 10 in (1.78 m)	RS So	Grand Island	Grand Island, NY
G	14	Teneka Whittaker	5 ft 7 in (1.7 m)	Sr	Our Lady of Lourdes	Poughkeepsie, NY
F	15	Kiara Palmer	6 ft 0 in (1.83 m)	So	Our Lady of Lourdes	Miami, FL
G	20	Dominique Ward	5 ft 11 in (1.8 m)	Fr	Rancocas Valley	Trenton, NJ
G	21	Symone Bullard	5 ft 7 in (1.7 m)	Jr	American heritage Plantation	Pompano Beach, FL
G	22	Dempsey Cooper	5 ft 9 in (1.75 m)	So	Germantown Academy	Doylestown, PA
G	23	Brianna Thomas	5 ft 9 in (1.75 m)	Jr	Gettysburg Area	Gettuysburg, PA
G	24	Megan Straumann	5 ft 8 in (1.73 m)	Sr	Cary-Grove	Cary, IL
F	30	Tyler Raysor	6 ft 3 in (1.91 m)	Fr	Haddon Heights	Lawnside, NJ
F	32	Sydney Lewis	5 ft 11 in (1.8 m)	Sr	Our Lady of Good Counsel	Beltsville, MD
F	33	Tati Johnson	6 ft 0 in (1.83 m)	Jr	Morristown-Beard School	Newark, NJ
F	34	Samantha Tabakman	6 ft 3 in (1.91 m)	Jr	Pequannock Township	Pompton Plains, NJ

Head coach

- Daynia La-Force (Georgetown)

Assistant coach(es)

- Tom Blake (Connecticut)
- Timothy Eatman (Talledega)
- Marcus Reilly (Trinity)

Legend

- (C) Team captain
- (S) Suspended
- (I) Ineligible
- (W) Walk-on
- Injured
- Current redshirt

Roster
Last update: 2014-07-08

== Schedule ==
Date time, TV	Rank^{#}	Opponent^{#}	Result	Record	Site (attendance) city, state
Regular Season
11/14/2014*; 11:00 am		Marshall; URI Tip-Off Tournament	L 45–61	0–1	Ryan Center (908); Kingston, RI
11/15/2014*; 3:00 pm		East Carolina; URI Tip-Off Tournament	L 38–66	0–2	Ryan Center (633); Kingston, RI
11/19/2014*; 7:00 pm		at UMass Lowell	W 75–66	1–2	Costello Athletic Center (411); Lowell, MA
11/24/2014*; 7:00 pm		at Columbia	L 69–79 ^{OT}	1–3	Levien Gymnasium (266); New York City, NY
11/28/2014*; 4:30 pm		vs. Towson; LIU Tournament	W 60–49	2–3	Steinberg Wellness Center (345); Brooklyn, NY
11/29/2014*; 2:00 pm		at LIU Brooklyn; LIU Tournament	W 66–49	3–3	Steinberg Wellness Center (397); Brooklyn, NY
12/03/2014*; 7:00 pm		Brown; Ocean State Cup	W 65–61	4–3	Ryan Center (362); Kingston, RI
12/06/2014*; 1:00 pm		Central Connecticut	W 58–46	5–3	Ryan Center (369); Kingston, RI
12/07/2014*; 2:00 pm		at Providence; Ocean State Cup	W 63–56	6–3	Alumni Hall (241); Providence, RI
12/09/2014*; 7:00 pm		Boston University	W 56–48	7–3	Ryan Center (365); Kingston, RI
12/21/2014*; 1:00 pm		at Bryant; Ocean State Cup	W 60–56	8–3	Chace Athletic Center (182); Smithfield, RI
12/30/2014*; 7:00 pm		Dartmouth	L 44–54	8–4	Ryan Center (288); Kingston, RI
01/03/2015; 1:00 pm		Duquesne	W 62–61	9–4 (1–0)	Ryan Center (366); Kingston, RI
01/08/2015; 7:00 pm		at VCU	L 48–64	9–5 (1–1)	Siegel Center (392); Richmond, VA
01/11/2015; 2:00 pm		at Davidson	W 71–62	10–5 (2–1)	John M. Belk Arena (427); Davidson, NC
01/15/2015; 7:00 pm		George Washington	L 49–59	10–6 (2–2)	Ryan Center (319); Kingston, RI
01/18/2015; 2:00 pm		La Salle	W 55–54	11–6 (3–2)	Ryan Center (933); Kingston, RI
02/21/2015; 7:00 pm		at Dayton	L 33–77	11–7 (3–3)	UD Arena (1,875); Dayton, OH
01/24/2015; 2:00 pm		at George Mason	W 57–45	12–7 (4–3)	Patriot Center (863); Fairfax, VA
01/30/2015; 7:00 pm		Richmond	L 50–54	12–8 (4–4)	Ryan Center (592); Kingston, RI
02/04/2015; 7:00 pm		Massachusetts	W 70–58	13–8 (5–4)	Ryan Center (407); Kingston, RI
02/08/2015; 1:00 pm		at St. Bonaventure	L 59–73	13–9 (5–5)	Reilly Center (826); Olean, NY
02/11/2015; 7:00 pm		Saint Joseph's	W 63–61 ^{OT}	14–9 (6–5)	Ryan Center (403); Kingston, RI
02/15/2015; 2:00 pm		Fordham	W 74–59	15–9 (7–5)	Ryan Center (433); Kingston, RI
02/19/2015; 7:00 pm		La Salle; Homecoming	L 45–47	15–10 (7–6)	Tom Gola Arena (305); Philadelphia, PA
02/22/2015; 2:00 pm		at Duquesne	L 50–60	15–11 (7–7)	Palumbo Center (750); Pittsburgh, PA
02/26/2015; 7:00 pm		Saint Louis	W 68–53	16–11 (8–7)	Ryan Center (669); Kingston, RI
03/01/2015; 2:00 pm		at Massachusetts	L 70–78	16–12 (8–8)	Mullins Center (612); Amherst, MA
Atlantic 10 Tournament
03/05/2015; 7:00 pm		vs. La Salle; Second Round	W 65–60	17–12	Richmond Coliseum (849); Richmond, VA
03/06/2015; 7:00 pm, ASN		vs. Duquesne; Quarterfinals	L 53–66	17–13	Richmond Coliseum (1,692); Richmond, VA
*Non-conference game. ^{#}Rankings from AP Poll. (#) Tournament seedings in parentheses. All times are in Eastern Time.

== Rankings ==
2014–15 NCAA Division I women's basketball rankings

+ Regular season polls	Poll	Pre- season	Week 2	Week 3	Week 4	Week 5	Week 6	Week 7	Week 8	Week 9	Week 10	Week 11	Week 12	Week 13	Week 14	Week 15	Week 16	Week 17	Week 18	Final
AP	NR	NR	NR	NR	NR	NR	NR	NR	NR	NR	NR	NR	NR	NR	NR	NR	NR	NR	NR	
Coaches	NR	NR	NR	NR	NR	NR	NR	NR	NR	NR	NR	NR	NR	NR	NR	NR	NR	NR	NR	

Legend
	Increase in ranking
	Decrease in ranking
	No change
(RV)	Received votes
(NR)	Not ranked

== See also ==
- 2014–15 Rhode Island Rams men's basketball team
