= Michael Shafer =

American basketball player and coach

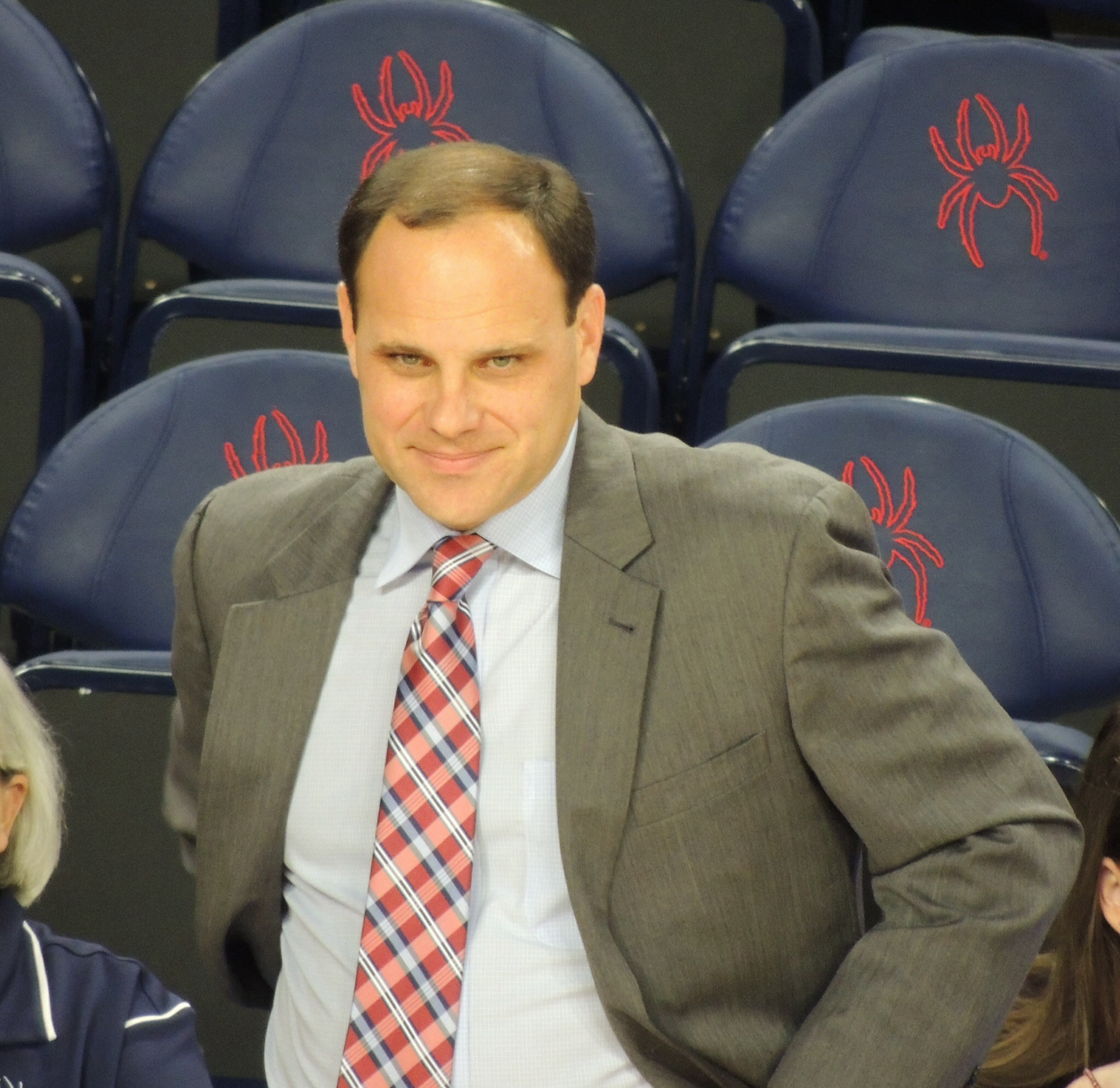

Biographical details
- Born: January 7, 1972 (age 54)

Playing career
- 1990–1994: William & Mary
- Position: Guard

Coaching career (HC unless noted)
- 1996–2003: Georgia (assistant)
- 2003–2005: Georgia (Associate HC)
- 2005–2019: Richmond

Head coaching record
- Overall: 223–214 (.510)

Michael Shafer (born January 7, 1972) is an American college basketball coach, most recently the women's head coach at the University of Richmond.

== Career ==
Shafer played at the College of William & Mary, where he walked on to the team. He was on the coaching staff at the University of Georgia from 1996 to 2005 before becoming head coach of the Spiders.

He holds the record for the number of wins by a women's basketball coach at the University of Richmond.

It was announced on March 10, 2019, that Shafer's contract would not be renewed.

== Head coaching record ==
Record table
| Season | Team | Overall | Conference | Standing | Postseason |
|---|---|---|---|---|---|
Richmond Spiders (Atlantic 10 Conference) (2005–present)
| 2005–06 | Richmond | 13–17 | 7–9 | T–8th | |
| 2006–07 | Richmond | 13–17 | 7–7 | T–6th | |
| 2007–08 | Richmond | 14–17 | 6–8 | T–7th | |
| 2008–09 | Richmond | 24–10 | 9–5 | T–4th | WNIT Third Round |
| 2009–10 | Richmond | 20–13 | 7–7 | 8th | WNIT Second Round |
| 2010–11 | Richmond | 18–12 | 9–5 | T–3rd | WNIT First Round |
| 2011–12 | Richmond | 23–9 | 9–5 | T–4th | WNIT Second Round |
| 2012–13 | Richmond | 16–16 | 6–8 | 9th | WNIT First Round |
| 2013–14 | Richmond | 14–16 | 8–8 | 9th | |
| 2014–15 | Richmond | 19–14 | 9–7 | 5th | WNIT Second Round |
| 2015–16 | Richmond | 13–18 | 5–11 | T–10th | |
| 2016–17 | Richmond | 13–17 | 7–9 | 9th | |
| 2017–18 | Richmond | 14–17 | 8–8 | 8th | |
| 2018–19 | Richmond | 9–21 | 6–10 | 11th | |
| Richmond: | | 223–214 (.510) | 103–107 (.490) | | |
| Total: | | 223–214 (.510) | | | |
National champion Postseason invitational champion Conference regular season champion Conference regular season and conference tournament champion Division regular season champion Division regular season and conference tournament champion Conference tournament champion
