= 2014–15 VCU Rams women's basketball team =

Intercollegiate basketball season

2014–15 VCU Rams women's basketball
- Conference: Atlantic 10 Conference
- Record: 16–14 (7–9 A-10)
- Head coach: Beth O'Boyle (1st season)
- Assistant coaches: Kate DeSorrento (1st season); Rob Norris (1st season); Nerlande Nicolas (1st season)
- Home arena: Stuart C. Siegel Center

2014–15 Atlantic 10 women's basketball standings
	Conf.				Overall
Team	W		L	PCT	W		L	PCT
No. 19 George Washington^{†}	15	–	1	.938	29	–	4	.879
Dayton	14	–	2	.875	28	–	7	.800
Duquesne	12	–	4	.750	23	–	11	.676
Fordham	11	–	5	.688	21	–	12	.636
Richmond	9	–	7	.563	19	–	14	.576
Rhode Island	8	–	8	.500	17	–	13	.567
Saint Joseph's	8	–	8	.500	13	–	17	.433
VCU	7	–	9	.438	16	–	14	.533
Saint Louis	7	–	9	.438	15	–	16	.484
St. Bonaventure	5	–	11	.313	15	–	15	.500
La Salle	5	–	11	.313	15	–	16	.484
George Mason	5	–	11	.313	13	–	17	.433
UMass	5	–	11	.313	12	–	18	.400
Davidson	1	–	15	.063	5	–	25	.167
† 2015 A10 Tournament winner As of 30 March 2015; Rankings from AP poll

The 2014–15 VCU Rams women's basketball team represented Virginia Commonwealth University during the 2014–15 college basketball season. Beth O'Boyle assumes the responsibility as head coach for her first season. The Rams were members of the Atlantic 10 Conference and played their home games at the Stuart C. Siegel Center. They finished the season 16–14, 7–9 in A-10 play to finish in a tie for eighth place. They lost in the second round of the A-10 women's tournament to Saint Louis.

== 2014–15 media ==
All non-televised Rams home games and conference road games will stream on the A-10 Digital Network.

== Roster ==
2014–15 VCU Rams women's basketball team
Players
Coaches

Pos.	#	Name	Height	Year	Previous school	Hometown
G	0	Ashley Pegram	5 ft 8 in (1.73 m)	So	Meadowbrook	Richmond, Virginia
G	2	Monnazjea Finney-Smith	6 ft 1 in (1.85 m)	So	Wilson	Portsmouth, Virginia
G	4	Brianna DuBose	5 ft 11 in (1.8 m)	So	Bishop McNamara	Bowie, Maryland
G	5	Chadarryl Clay	5 ft 8 in (1.73 m)	RS So	Girls Preparatory School	Chattanooga, Tennessee
G	10	Shanice Johnson	6 ft 0 in (1.83 m)	RS Fr	Cardinal O'Hara	Philadelphia
G	13	Brittany Burgess	5 ft 11 in (1.8 m)	So	St. Mary's Ryken	White Plains, Maryland
G/F	20	Adaeze Alaeze	5 ft 10 in (1.78 m)	Jr	Roland Park	Baltimore
G	21	Ashlee Mitchell	5 ft 7 in (1.7 m)	So	Tennessee	Bristol, Tennessee
F	25	Curteeona Brelove	6 ft 2 in (1.88 m)	Fr	Malone	Malone, Florida
G	34	Keira Robinson	5 ft 8 in (1.73 m)	So	Keenan	Columbia, South Carolina
G/F	44	Camille Calhoun	6 ft 0 in (1.83 m)	So	Archbishop Spalding	Bowie, Maryland
G	45	Isis Thorpe	5 ft 8 in (1.73 m)	So	Reading	Reading, Pennsylvania
F/C	55	Melanie Royster	6 ft 3 in (1.91 m)	RS Jr	Elizabeth Seton	Bowie, Maryland

Head coach

- Beth O'Boyle

Assistant coach(es)

- Kate DeSorrento
- Rob Norris
- Nerlande Nicholas

Legend

- (C) Team captain
- (S) Suspended
- (I) Ineligible
- (W) Walk-on
- Injured
- Current redshirt

Roster
Last update: 2014-11-18

== Schedule ==
Date time, TV	Rank^{#}	Opponent^{#}	Result	Record	Site (attendance) city, state
Regular Season
11/14/2014*; 7:00 pm		Wagner	W 84–75	1–0	Siegel Center (N/A); Richmond, Virginia
11/16/2014*; 7:00 pm		Presbyterian	W 55–36	2–0	Siegel Center (N/A); Richmond, Virginia
11/18/2014*; 12:00 pm, ESPN3		at Liberty	L 53–69	2–1	Vines Center (1,083); Lynchburg, Virginia
11/20/2014*; 7:00 pm		at Maryland Eastern Shore	W 72–50	3–1	Hytche Athletic Center (513); Princess Anne, Maryland
11/23/2014*; 2:00 pm		at Ohio State	L 86–96	3–2	Value City Arena (4,201); Columbus, Ohio
11/26/2014*; 7:00 pm		at William & Mary	L 48–56	3–3	Kaplan Arena (286); Williamsburg, Virginia
12/02/2014*; 7:00 pm		at UNC Wilmington	W 59–53	4–3	Trask Coliseum (466); Wilmington, North Carolina
12/05/2014*; 7:00 pm, COX		at Old Dominion; Rivalry	L 44–66	4–4	Ted Constant Convocation Center (2,141); Norfolk, Virginia
12/14/2014*; 1:00 pm		UNC Greensboro	W 80–73	5–4	Siegel Center (491); Richmond, Virginia
12/18/2014*; 11:00 am		High Point	W 81–59	6–4	Siegel Center (1,758); Richmond, Virginia
12/21/2014*; 1:00 pm		Texas–Pan American	W 64–43	7–4	Siegel Center (556); Richmond, Virginia
12/28/2014*; 1:00 pm		at Coppin State	W 63–52	8–4	Physical Education Complex (271); Baltimore
12/30/2014*; 7:00 pm		North Carolina A&T	W 60–51	9–4	Siegel Center (814); Richmond, Virginia
01/03/2015; 7:00 pm		at Saint Joseph's	L 46–63	9–5 (0–1)	Hagan Arena (1,143); Philadelphia
01/08/2015; 7:00 pm		Rhode Island	W 64–48	10–5 (1–1)	Siegel Center (392); Richmond, Virginia
01/12/2015; 8:00 pm		at Saint Louis	W 59–54	11–5 (2–1)	Chaifetz Arena (167); St. Louis, Missouri
01/15/2015; 7:00 pm		Davidson	W 62–53	12–5 (3–1)	Siegel Center (572); Richmond, Virginia
01/18/2015; 2:00 pm		at Fordham	L 51–60	12–6 (3–2)	Rose Hill Gymnasium (358); Bronx, New York
01/21/2015; 7:00 pm		at St. Bonaventure	W 61–51	13–6 (4–2)	Reilly Center (819); Olean, New York
01/24/2015; 1:00 pm		Dayton	L 56–75	13–7 (4–3)	Siegel Center (872); Richmond, Virginia
01/28/2015; 7:00 pm		George Mason; Rivalry	W 70–66	14–7 (5–3)	Siegel Center (457); Richmond, Virginia
01/31/2015; 7:00 pm		La Salle	L 65–74	14–8 (5–4)	Siegel Center (759); Richmond, Virginia
02/04/2015; 7:00 pm		at Richmond; Capital City Classic	L 63–67	14–9 (5–5)	Robins Center (521); Richmond, Virginia
02/07/2015; 2:00 pm		at Duquesne	L 47–83	14–10 (5–6)	Palumbo Center (722); Pittsburgh
02/14/2015; 12:00 pm		at George Mason; Rivalry	L 79–86	14–11 (5–7)	Patriot Center (636); Fairfax, Virginia
02/18/2015; 7:00 pm		No. 24 George Washington	L 57–65	14–12 (5–8)	Siegel Center (413); Richmond, Virginia
02/22/2015; 1:00 pm		Massachusetts	W 65–43	15–12 (6–8)	Siegel Center (939); Richmond, Virginia
02/25/2015; 7:00 pm		at Davidson	W 66–63	16–12 (7–8)	John M. Belk Arena (413); Davidson, North Carolina
03/01/2015; 2:00 pm, CBSSN		Richmond; Capital City Classic	L 49–55	16–13 (7–9)	Siegel Center (1,800); Richmond, Virginia
Atlantic 10 Tournament
03/05/2015; 11:30 am	(8)	vs. (9) Saint Louis; Second Round	L 58–65	16–14	Richmond Coliseum (N/A); Richmond, Virginia
*Non-conference game. ^{#}Rankings from AP Poll. (#) Tournament seedings in parentheses. All times are in Eastern Time.

== Rankings ==
2014–15 NCAA Division I women's basketball rankings

+ Regular season polls	Poll	Pre- season	Week 2	Week 3	Week 4	Week 5	Week 6	Week 7	Week 8	Week 9	Week 10	Week 11	Week 12	Week 13	Week 14	Week 15	Week 16	Week 17	Week 18	Final
AP	NR	NR	NR	NR	NR	NR	NR	NR	NR	NR	NR	NR	NR	NR	NR	NR	NR	NR	NR	
Coaches	NR	NR	NR	NR	NR	NR	NR	NR	NR	NR	NR	NR	NR	NR	NR	NR	NR	NR	NR	

Legend
	Increase in ranking
	Decrease in ranking
	No change
(RV)	Received votes
(NR)	Not ranked

== See also ==
- 2014–15 VCU Rams men's basketball team
- VCU Rams women's basketball
