= 2014–15 Saint Louis Billikens women's basketball team =

Intercollegiate basketball season

2014–15 Saint Louis Billikens women's basketball
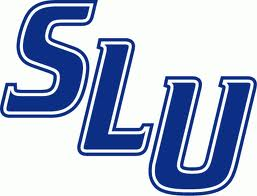
- Conference: Atlantic 10 Conference
- Record: 15–16 (7–9 A-10)
- Head coach: Lisa Stone (3rd season)
- Assistant coaches: Mike Geary (2nd season); Glenn Box (1st season); Linda Sayavongchanh (2nd season)
- Home arena: Chaifetz Arena

2014–15 Atlantic 10 women's basketball standings
	Conf.				Overall
Team	W		L	PCT	W		L	PCT
No. 19 George Washington^{†}	15	–	1	.938	29	–	4	.879
Dayton	14	–	2	.875	28	–	7	.800
Duquesne	12	–	4	.750	23	–	11	.676
Fordham	11	–	5	.688	21	–	12	.636
Richmond	9	–	7	.563	19	–	14	.576
Rhode Island	8	–	8	.500	17	–	13	.567
Saint Joseph's	8	–	8	.500	13	–	17	.433
VCU	7	–	9	.438	16	–	14	.533
Saint Louis	7	–	9	.438	15	–	16	.484
St. Bonaventure	5	–	11	.313	15	–	15	.500
La Salle	5	–	11	.313	15	–	16	.484
George Mason	5	–	11	.313	13	–	17	.433
UMass	5	–	11	.313	12	–	18	.400
Davidson	1	–	15	.063	5	–	25	.167
† 2015 A10 Tournament winner As of 30 March 2015; Rankings from AP poll

The 2014–15 Saint Louis Billikens women's basketball team represented the Saint Louis University during the 2014–15 college basketball season. Lisa Stone assumes the responsibility as head coach for her third season. The Billikens were members of the Atlantic 10 Conference and play their home games at the Chaifetz Arena. They finished the season 15–16, 7–9 in A-10 play to finish in a tie for eighth place. They advanced to the quarterfinals of the A-10 women's tournament where they lost to George Washington.

== 2014–15 media ==
All non-televised Billikens home games and conference road games will stream on the A-10 Digital Network.

== Roster ==
2014–15 Saint Louis Billikens women's basketball team
Players
Coaches

Pos.	#	Name	Height	Year	Previous school	Hometown
F	1	Briana Gray	5 ft 10 in (1.78 m)	So	Nicolet	Milwaukee, WI
G	2	Regan Carmichael	5 ft 8 in (1.73 m)	So	Maine South	Park Ridge, IL
G	3	Jackie Kemph	5 ft 7 in (1.7 m)	Fr	Rolling Meadows	Arlington Heights, IL
G	5	Aaliyah Covington	5 ft 11 in (1.8 m)	Fr	Edwardsville	Edwardsville, IL
F	10	Jenny Vliet	6 ft 2 in (1.88 m)	Fr	Rolling Meadows	Arlington Heights, IL
G	11	Jamesia Price	5 ft 7 in (1.7 m)	RS Jr	Blue Springs	Blue Springs, MO
F	12	Olivia Jakubicek	5 ft 10 in (1.78 m)	So	Cary-Grove	Cary, IL
G	13	Erika Cook	5 ft 11 in (1.8 m)	Sr	Hunters Lane	Nashville, TN
G	21	Lexi Lopez	5 ft 9 in (1.75 m)	So	Southview	Sylvania, OH
G	23	Desirae Ball	5 ft 9 in (1.75 m)	RS Sr	Ursuline	Cincinnati, OH
F	33	Erin Nelson	5 ft 10 in (1.78 m)	So	St. Joseph's	Ballwin, MO
F	34	Denisha Womack	6 ft 1 in (1.85 m)	Jr	Peoria Central	Peoria, IL
C	40	Sadie Stipanovich	6 ft 3 in (1.91 m)	So	Westminster Christian Academy	St. Louis, MO
F	42	Maddison Gits	6 ft 4 in (1.93 m)	Fr	Oregon	Fitchburg, WI
F	55	Shea Shipman	6 ft 0 in (1.83 m)	Fr	Olathe Northwest	Olathe, KS

Head coach

- Lisa Stone (Iowa)

Assistant coach(es)

- Mike Geary (Aquinias)
- Glenn Box (Southeast Missouri State)
- Linda Sayavongchanh (Drake)

Legend

- (C) Team captain
- (S) Suspended
- (I) Ineligible
- (W) Walk-on
- Injured
- Current redshirt

Roster
Last update: 2014-07-09

== Schedule ==
Date time, TV	Rank^{#}	Opponent^{#}	Result	Record	Site (attendance) city, state
Exhibition
11/08/2014*; 3:30 pm		Harris–Stowe	W 106–37	–	Chaifetz Arena (N/A); St. Louis, MO
Regular Season
11/14/2014*; 6:05 pm		at Indiana State	L 60–63	0–1	Hulman Center (2,021); Terre Haute, IN
11/17/2014*; 7:00 pm		SIU Edwardsville	W 74–63	1–1	Chaifetz Arena (579); St. Louis, MO
11/21/2014*; 6:30 pm		at Southeast Missouri State	W 74–56	2–1	Show Me Center (1,058); Cape Girardeau, MO
11/24/2014*; 11:30 am		at Vanderbilt	L 57–75	2–2	Memorial Gymnasium (6,598); Nashville, TN
11/28/2014*; 1:00 pm		Mercer	L 75–80 ^{2OT}	2–3	Chaifetz Arena (314); St. Louis, MO
12/03/2014*; 11:30 am		at Tulsa	W 63–58	3–3	Reynolds Center (997); Tulsa, OK
12/06/2014*; 7:00 pm		Missouri–St. Louis	W 68–49	4–3	Chaifetz Arena (202); St. Louis, MO
12/08/2014*; 7:00 pm		at Missouri	L 55–74	4–4	Mizzou Arena (1,212); Columbia, MO
12/14/2014*; 2:00 pm		Indiana State	L 58–68	4–5	Chaifetz Arena (347); St. Louis, MO
12/19/2014*; 6:30 pm		vs. Austin Peay; Lady Griz Holiday Classic semifinals	L 81–86	4–6	Dahlberg Arena (837); Missoula, MT
12/20/2014*; 6:30 pm		vs. Utah Valley; Lady Griz Holiday Classic 3rd place game	W 68–66	5–6	Dahlberg Arena (917); Missoula, MT
12/28/2014*; 2:00 pm		at Eastern Illinois	W 63–49	6–6	Lantz Arena (408); Charleston, IL
12/30/2014*; 7:00 pm		Ball State	W 73–68 ^{OT}	7–6	Chaifetz Arena (383); St. Louis, MO
01/04/2015; 1:00 pm, NBCSN		at George Mason	L 57–66	7–7 (0–1)	Patriot Center (623); Fairfax, VA
01/07/2015; 6:00 pm		at Massachusetts	W 75–67	8–7 (1–1)	Mullins Center (321); Amherst, MA
01/12/2015; 7:00 pm		VCU	L 54–59	8–8 (1–2)	Chaifetz Arena (167); St. Louis, MO
01/15/2015; 6:00 pm		at Duquesne	L 64–77	8–9 (1–3)	Palumbo Center (519); Pittsburgh, PA
01/18/2015; 2:00 pm		Davidson	L 50–53	8–10 (1–4)	Chaifetz Arena (319); St. Louis, MO
01/21/2015; 2:00 pm		at La Salle	W 76–47	9–10 (2–4)	Tom Gola Arena (227); Philadelphia, PA
01/24/2015; 3:00 pm, CBSSN		Fordham	W 54–50	10–10 (3–4)	Chaifetz Arena (3,920); St. Louis, MO
01/29/2015; 11:30 am		Saint Joseph's	W 52–51	11–10 (4–4)	Chaifetz Arena (1,517); St. Louis, MO
01/31/2015; 2:00 pm		at Dayton	L 72–87	11–11 (4–5)	UD Arena (2,850); Dayton, OH
02/07/2015; 2:30 pm		at Richmond	L 72–75 ^{OT}	11–12 (4–6)	Robins Center (1,098); Richmond, VA
02/11/2015; 7:00 pm		No. 20 George Washington	W 79–61	12–12 (5–6)	Chaifetz Arena (311); St. Louis, MO
02/14/2015; 1:00 pm		at Davidson	W 77–59	13–12 (6–6)	John M. Belk Arena (753); Davidson, NC
02/18/2015; 7:00 pm		St. Bonaventure	L 55–57	13–13 (6–7)	Chaifetz Arena (371); St. Louis, MO
02/21/2015; 7:00 pm		George Mason	W 82–59	14–13 (7–7)	Chaifetz Arena (7,184); St. Louis, MO
02/26/2015; 6:00 pm		at Rhode Island	L 53–68	14–14 (7–8)	Ryan Center (669); Kingston, RI
03/01/2015; 2:00 pm		Dayton	L 68–95	14–15 (7–9)	Chaifetz Arena (1,531); St. Louis, MO
Atlantic 10 Tournament
03/05/2015; 10:30 am		vs. VCU; Second Round	W 65–58	15–15	Richmond Coliseum (N/A); Richmond, VA
03/05/2015; 10:30 am, ASN		vs. No. 21 George Washington; Quarterfinals	L 63–77	15–16	Richmond Coliseum (N/A); Richmond, VA
*Non-conference game. ^{#}Rankings from AP Poll. (#) Tournament seedings in parentheses. All times are in Central Time.

== Rankings ==
2014–15 NCAA Division I women's basketball rankings

+ Regular season polls	Poll	Pre- Season	Week 2	Week 3	Week 4	Week 5	Week 6	Week 7	Week 8	Week 9	Week 10	Week 11	Week 12	Week 13	Week 14	Week 15	Week 16	Week 17	Week 18	Final
AP	NR	NR	NR	NR	NR	NR	NR	NR	NR	NR	NR	NR	NR	NR	NR	NR	NR	NR	NR	
Coaches	NR	NR	NR	NR	NR	NR	NR	NR	NR	NR	NR	NR	NR	NR	NR	NR	NR	NR	NR	

Legend
	Increase in ranking
	Decrease in ranking
	No change
(RV)	Received votes
(NR)	Not ranked

== See also ==
- 2014–15 Saint Louis Billikens men's basketball team
- Saint Louis Billikens women's basketball
