= 2014–15 Dayton Flyers women's basketball team =

Intercollegiate basketball season

2014–15 Dayton Flyers women's basketball

NCAA Women's Tournament, Elite Eight
- Conference: Atlantic 10 Conference
- Record: 28–7 (14–2 A-10)
- Head coach: Jim Jabir (12th season)
- Assistant coaches: Shauna Green (3rd season); Camryn Whitaker (2nd season); Simon Harris (1st season)
- Home arena: University of Dayton Arena

2014–15 Atlantic 10 women's basketball standings
	Conf.				Overall
Team	W		L	PCT	W		L	PCT
No. 19 George Washington^{†}	15	–	1	.938	29	–	4	.879
Dayton	14	–	2	.875	28	–	7	.800
Duquesne	12	–	4	.750	23	–	11	.676
Fordham	11	–	5	.688	21	–	12	.636
Richmond	9	–	7	.563	19	–	14	.576
Rhode Island	8	–	8	.500	17	–	13	.567
Saint Joseph's	8	–	8	.500	13	–	17	.433
VCU	7	–	9	.438	16	–	14	.533
Saint Louis	7	–	9	.438	15	–	16	.484
St. Bonaventure	5	–	11	.313	15	–	15	.500
La Salle	5	–	11	.313	15	–	16	.484
George Mason	5	–	11	.313	13	–	17	.433
UMass	5	–	11	.313	12	–	18	.400
Davidson	1	–	15	.063	5	–	25	.167
† 2015 A10 Tournament winner As of 30 March 2015; Rankings from AP poll

The 2014–15 Dayton Flyers women's basketball team represented the University of Dayton during the 2014–15 college basketball season. Jim Jabir resumed the responsibility as head coach for a 12th consecutive season. The Flyers were members of the Atlantic 10 Conference and played their home games at the University of Dayton Arena. They finished the season 28–7, 14–2 in A-10 play to finish in second place. They advanced to the championship game of the A-10 women's tournament, where they lost to George Washington. They received an at-large bid to the NCAA women's tournament, where they defeated Iowa State in the first round, upset Kentucky in the second round and Louisville in the sweet sixteen before losing to Connecticut in the elite eight.

== 2014–15 media ==
=== Dayton Flyers Sports Network ===
The Dayton Flyers Sports Network will broadcast Flyers games off of their athletic website, DaytonFlyers.com, with Shane White on the call. Most home games will also be featured on the A-10 Digital Network. Select games will be televised.

== Roster ==
2014–15 Dayton Flyers women's basketball team
Players
Coaches

Pos.	#	Name	Height	Year	Previous school	Hometown
G	2	Amber Deane	5 ft 9 in (1.75 m)	Jr	Detroit Country Day	Lathrup Village, MI
G	3	Christy Macioce	6 ft 0 in (1.83 m)	So	Pickerington North	Pickerington, OH
G	5	Celeste Edwards	5 ft 9 in (1.75 m)	So	North Central	Indianapolis, IN
F	10	Andrijana Cvitkovic	6 ft 3 in (1.91 m)	So	Culver Girls Academy	Kraljevica, Croatia
F	11	Ally Malott	6 ft 4 in (1.93 m)	Sr	Madison	Middletown, OH
C	12	Jodie Cornelie-Sigmundova	6 ft 4 in (1.93 m)	Jr	Oak Hill Academy	Strasbourg, France
G	14	Jenna Burdette	5 ft 8 in (1.73 m)	Fr	Eastern Local	Coolville, OH
G	22	Kelley Austria	6 ft 0 in (1.83 m)	Jr	Dayton Carroll	Beavercreek, OH
G	24	Andrea Hoover	5 ft 9 in (1.75 m)	Sr	Spring Valley Academy	Bellbrook, OH
G	32	Tiffany Johnson	5 ft 8 in (1.73 m)	Sr	Prep Charter	Philadelphia, PA
G	33	JaVonna Layfield	5 ft 10 in (1.78 m)	Fr	Ballard	Louisville, KY
C	55	Saicha Grant-Allen	6 ft 5 in (1.96 m)	So	Glendale Secondary	Hamilton, Ontario

Head coach

- Jim Jabir (Nazareth)

Assistant coach(es)

- Shauna Green (Canisius)
- Camryn Whitaker (WKU)
- Simon Harris (NC State)

Legend

- (C) Team captain
- (S) Suspended
- (I) Ineligible
- (W) Walk-on
- Injured
- Current redshirt

Roster
Last update: 2014-07-06

== Schedule ==
Date time, TV	Rank^{#}	Opponent^{#}	Result	Record	Site (attendance) city, state
Exhibition
11/07/2014*; 7:00 pm	No. 22	Eckerd College	W 93–18	–	UD Arena (1,070); Dayton, OH
Non-conference regular season
11/14/2014*; 10:00 pm	No. 22	at Washington State	L 60–76	0–1	Beasley Coliseum (827); Pullman, WA
11/16/2014*; 5:00 pm	No. 22	at Gonzaga	L 65–75	0–2	McCarthey Athletic Center (5,442); Spokane, WA
11/21/2014*; 6:00 pm		vs. Tennessee–Martin; Hawkeye Challenge semifinals	W 78–47	1–2	Carver–Hawkeye Arena (204); Iowa City, IA
11/22/2014*; 8:30 pm		at No. 18 Iowa; Hawkeye Challenge championship	L 83–90	1–3	Carver–Hawkeye Arena (3,381); Iowa City, IA
11/26/2014*; 7:00 pm		Providence	W 72–56	2–3	UD Arena (2,026); Dayton, OH
12/03/2014*; 7:00 pm, ESPN3		at Wright State	W 79–76	3–3	Nutter Center (1,583); Fairborn, OH
12/07/2014*; 2:00 pm		Purdue	W 63–61	4–3	University of Dayton Arena (2,106); Dayton, OH
12/10/2014*; 11:00 am		Toledo	W 79–57	5–3	UD Arena (7,035); Dayton, OH
12/13/2014*; 2:00 pm		Central Michigan	W 86–76	6–3	UD Arena (1,539); Dayton, OH
12/21/2014*; 3:00 pm		at Vanderbilt	W 71–67	7–3	Memorial Gymnasium (2,910); Nashville, TN
12/28/2014*; 2:00 pm		No. 24 Green Bay	W 72–66	8–3	UD Arena (1,755); Dayton, OH
12/31/2014*; 1:00 pm, ESPN3		at Central Michigan	W 98–89	9–3	McGuirk Arena (1,264); Mount Pleasant, MI
Atlantic 10 regular season
01/04/2015; 3:30 pm, ESPNU		George Washington	L 66–69	9–4 (0–1)	UD Arena (2,534); Dayton, OH
01/07/2015; 12:00 pm		at Davidson	W 67–51	10–4 (1–1)	John M. Belk Arena (783); Davidson, NC
01/11/2015; 2:00 pm		Duquesne	W 78–67	11–4 (2–1)	UD Arena (1,894); Dayton, OH
01/18/2015; 5:00 pm, NBCSN		at St. Bonaventure	W 86–70	12–4 (3–1)	Reilly Center (1,040); Olean, NY
01/21/2015; 7:00 pm		Rhode Island	W 77–33	13–4 (4–1)	UD Arena (1,875); Dayton, OH
01/24/2015; 1:00 pm		at VCU	W 75–56	14–4 (5–1)	Siegel Center (872); Richmond, VA
01/28/2015; 12:00 pm		at Richmond	W 76–62	15–4 (6–1)	Robins Center (763); Richmond, VA
01/31/2015; 3:00 pm		Saint Louis	W 87–72	16–4 (7–1)	UD Arena (2,850); Dayton, OH
02/05/2015; 7:00 pm		at George Mason	W 84–73	17–4 (8–1)	Patriot Center (601); Fairfax, VA
02/08/2015; 12:00 pm, CBSSN		at No. 24 George Washington	L 56–67	17–5 (8–2)	Charles E. Smith Center (1,703); Washington, D.C.
02/11/2015; 7:00 pm		Richmond	W 79–41	18–5 (9–2)	UD Arena (1,614); Dayton, OH
02/15/2015; 12:00 pm, CBSSN		Saint Joseph's	W 82–64	19–5 (10–2)	UD Arena (1,819); Dayton, OH
02/18/2015; 7:00 pm		at Fordham	W 59–45	20–5 (11–2)	Rose Hill Gymnasium (522); Bronx, NY
02/22/2015; 4:00 pm		La Salle	W 91–49	21–5 (12–2)	UD Arena (2,837); Dayton, OH
02/26/2015; 7:00 pm		Massachusetts	W 69–60	22–5 (13–2)	UD Arena (2,061); Dayton, OH
03/01/2015; 3:00 pm		at Saint Louis	W 95–68	23–5 (14–2)	Chaifetz Arena (1,531); St. Louis, MO
Atlantic 10 Tournament
03/06/2015; 4:30 pm, ASN		vs. Saint Joseph's; Quarterfinals	W 80–61	24–5	Richmond Coliseum (1,692); Richmond, VA
03/07/2015; 1:30 pm, CBSSN		vs. Duquesne; Semifinals	W 74–60	25–5	Richmond Coliseum (1,588); Richmond, VA
03/08/2015; 1:00 pm, ESPNU		vs. No. 21 George Washington; Championship Game	L 62–75	25–6	Richmond Coliseum (N/A); Richmond, VA
NCAA tournament
03/20/2015*; 12:00 pm, ESPN2		vs. Iowa State; First Round	W 78–66	26–6	Memorial Coliseum (N/A); Lexington, KY
03/22/2015*; 2:30 pm, ESPN2		at No. 11 Kentucky; Second Round	W 99–94	27–6	Memorial Coliseum (3,320); Lexington, KY
03/28/2015*; 2:20 pm, ESPN		vs. No. 8 Louisville; Sweet Sixteen	W 82–66	28–6	Times Union Center (8,259); Albany, NY
03/30/2015*; 7:00 pm, ESPN		vs. No. 1 Connecticut; Elite Eight	L 70–91	28–7	Times Union Center (7,686); Albany, NY
*Non-conference game. ^{#}Rankings from AP Poll. (#) Tournament seedings in parentheses. All times are in Eastern Time.

== Rankings ==
2014–15 NCAA Division I women's basketball rankings

Regular season polls
Poll	Pre- Season	Week 2	Week 3	Week 4	Week 5	Week 6	Week 7	Week 8	Week 9	Week 10	Week 11	Week 12	Week 13	Week 14	Week 15	Week 16	Week 17	Week 18	Final
AP	22	NR	NR	NR	NR	NR	NR	RV	NR	NR	NR	NR	RV	NR	RV	RV	RV	RV	RV
Coaches	22	RV	RV	RV	RV	RV	RV	RV	NR	NR	NR	NR	RV	NR	NR	NR	NR	NR	NR

Legend
	Increase in ranking
	Decrease in ranking
	No change
(RV)	Received votes
(NR)	Not ranked

== See also ==
- 2014–15 Dayton Flyers men's basketball team
