= Nyla Milleson =

American basketball coach (born 1962)

Current position
- Title: Athletics director
- Team: Drury University
- Conference: Great Lakes Valley Conference (Division II)

Biographical details
- Born: September 8, 1962 (age 64)

Coaching career (HC unless noted)
- 2007–2013: Missouri State
- 2013–2021: George Mason

Head coaching record
- Overall: 203–227 (.472)

Nyla Milleson (born September 8, 1962) is the athletic director at Drury University and the former women's basketball head coach of Missouri State University and George Mason University. She was hired at Missouri State before the 2007–08 season and compiled a 105–87 overall record with the Lady Bears and a Missouri Valley Conference record of 59–49. She was relieved of coaching duties after the 2012–13 season and was hired by George Mason for the following season. She resigned at George Mason after the 2020–2021 season; her record with the Patriots was 98–140, including a mark of 40–86 in the Atlantic 10 Conference. Her overall record as an NCAA Division I head coach is 203–227.

After one year as athletic director at Hollister R-V School District, in February 2022, Milleson was named athletics director at Drury University.
