= 2014–15 Harvard Crimson women's basketball team =

Intercollegiate basketball season

2014–15 Harvard Crimson women's basketball
- Conference: Ivy League
- Record: 14–14 (7–7 Ivy)
- Head coach: Kathy Delaney-Smith (33rd season)
- Assistant coaches: Lindsay Miller; Amanda Leahy
- Home arena: Lavietes Pavilion

2014–15 Ivy League women's basketball standings
	Conf.				Overall
Team	W		L	PCT	W		L	PCT
No. 13 Princeton^{†}	14	–	0	1.000	31	–	1	.969
Penn	11	–	3	.786	21	–	9	.700
Harvard	7	–	7	.500	14	–	14	.500
Yale	7	–	7	.500	13	–	15	.464
Cornell	6	–	8	.429	15	–	13	.536
Dartmouth	5	–	9	.357	14	–	14	.500
Brown	4	–	10	.286	10	–	18	.357
Columbia	2	–	12	.143	8	–	20	.286
† Ivy League winner Rankings from AP Poll

The 2014–15 Harvard Crimson women's basketball team represented Harvard University during the 2014–15 NCAA Division I women's basketball season. The Crimson, led by thirty-third year head coach Kathy Delaney-Smith, played their home games at the Lavietes Pavilion and were members of the Ivy League.

== Roster ==
2014–15 Harvard Crimson women's basketball team
Players	Coaches
Pos. / # / Name / Height / Year / Hometown	Head coach: Kathy Delaney-Smith; Assistant coach(es): Lindsay Miller; Amanda Leahy; Legend: (C) Team captain; (S) Suspended; (I) Ineligible; (W) Walk-on; Injured; Current redshirt; Roster

== Schedule ==
Date time, TV	Opponent	Result	Record	Site (attendance) city, state
Regular season
11/15/2014* no, no	Colgate	W 68–53	1–0	Lavietes Pavilion (506); Boston, Massachusetts
11/17/2014* no, no	at Boston University	L 62–63	1–1	Case Gym (336); Boston, MA
11/23/2014* no, no	vs. Quinnipiac; Hall of Fame Women's Challenge	W 87–83	2–1	Edmund P. Joyce Center (8,684); South Bend, IN
11/24/2014* no, no	at Notre Dame; Hall of Fame Women's Challenge	L 43–97	2–2	Edmund P. Joyce Center (8,566); South Bend, IN
11/25/2014* no, no	vs. Holy Cross; Hall of Fame Women's Challenge	W 79–76 ^{OT}	3–2	Edmund P. Joyce Center (8,429); South Bend, IN
11/30/2014* no, no	vs. Temple; Hall of Fame Women's Challenge	L 69–81	3–3	Mohegan Sun Arena (2,307); Uncasville, CT
12/03/2014* no, no	at Massachusetts	W 75–62	4–3	Mullins Center (302); Amherst, MA
12/07/2014* no, no	at Maine	L 46–65	4–4	Cross Insurance Center (1,312); Bangor, ME
12/20/2014* no, no	Northeastern	W 67–65	5–4	Lavietes Pavilion (512); Boston, Massachusetts
12/29/2014* no, no	vs. Louisiana Tech; Georgia Tech Holiday Tournament semifinals	L 64–83	5–5	McCamish Pavilion (217); Atlanta, GA
12/30/2014* no, no	vs. Lipscomb; Georgia Tech Holiday Tournament 3rd place game	W 81–63	6–5	McCamish Pavilion (136); Atlanta, GA
01/02/2015* no, no	Florida Gulf Coast	L 58–68	6–6	Lavietes Pavilion (412); Boston, Massachusetts
01/05/2015* no, no	Chattanooga	L 52–54	6–7	Lavietes Pavilion (1,142); Boston, Massachusetts
01/10/2015 no, no	Dartmouth	L 61–76	6–8 (0–1)	Lavietes Pavilion (507); Boston, Massachusetts
01/18/2015* no, no	NJIT	W 66–54	7–8	Lavietes Pavilion (309); Boston, Massachusetts
01/24/2015 no, no	at Dartmouth	W 75–69	8–8 (1–1)	Leede Arena (763); Hanover, NH
01/30/2015 no, no	No. 19 Princeton	L 46–96	8–9 (1–2)	Lavietes Pavilion (1,117); Boston, Massachusetts
01/31/2015 no, no	Penn	L 69–74	8–10 (1–3)	Lavietes Pavilion (664); Boston, Massachusetts
02/06/2015 no, no	Brown	L 80–83	8–11 (1–4)	Lavietes Pavilion (553); Boston, Massachusetts
02/07/2015 no, no	Yale	W 65–55	9–11 (2–4)	Lavietes Pavilion (1,854); Boston, Massachusetts
02/13/2015 no, no	at Columbia	L 43–59	9–12 (2–5)	Levien Gymnasium (309); New York City, NY
02/14/2015 no, no	at Cornell	W 61–57	10–12 (3–5)	Newman Arena (315); Ithaca, NY
02/20/2015 no, no	at Penn	L 61–71	10–13 (3–6)	Palestra (664); Philadelphia, PA
02/21/2015 no, no	at No. 16 Princeton	L 57–78	10–14 (3–7)	Jadwin Gymnasium (1,502); Princeton, NJ
02/27/2015 no, no	Cornell	W 60–54	11–14 (4–7)	Lavietes Pavilion (708); Boston, Massachusetts
02/28/2015 no, no	Columbia	W 82–81	12–14 (5–7)	Lavietes Pavilion (721); Boston, Massachusetts
03/06/2015 no, no	at Yale	W 68–63	13–14 (6–7)	John J. Lee Amphitheater (312); New Haven, CT
03/07/2015 no, no	at Brown	W 76–69	14–14 (7–7)	Pizzitola Sports Center (380); Providence, RI
*Non-conference game. ^{#}Rankings from AP Poll. (#) Tournament seedings in parentheses.

== See also ==
- 2014–15 Harvard Crimson men's basketball team
