= 2014–15 Stony Brook Seawolves women's basketball team =

Intercollegiate basketball season

2014–15 Stony Brook Seawolves women's basketball

WBI, First Round
- Conference: America East Conference
- Record: 17–14 (10–6 America East)
- Head coach: Caroline McCombs (1st season)
- Assistant coaches: Chenel Harris (1st season); Adam Call (1st season); Kelly Rotan (1st season)
- Home arena: Island Federal Credit Union Arena

2014–15 America East Conference women's basketball standings
	Conf.				Overall
Team	W		L	PCT	W		L	PCT
Albany †	14	–	2	.875	24	–	9	.727
Maine	14	–	2	.875	23	–	9	.719
Stony Brook	10	–	6	.625	17	–	14	.548
New Hampshire	9	–	7	.563	17	–	12	.586
Hartford	8	–	8	.500	16	–	17	.485
UMass Lowell*	7	–	9	.438	14	–	15	.483
UMBC	6	–	10	.375	12	–	19	.387
Vermont	2	–	14	.125	5	–	24	.172
Binghamton	2	–	14	.125	4	–	26	.133
† 2015 America East tournament winner As of March 20, 2015 *ineligible for postseason play due to Div. I transitions Rankings from AP poll

The 2014–15 Stony Brook Seawolves women's basketball team represented Stony Brook University in the America East Conference. The Seawolves were led by first-year head coach Caroline McCombs and played their home games at the Island Federal Credit Union Arena. They finished the season 17-13, 10-6 in America East play for a third-place finish. They lost in the quarterfinals of the 2015 America East women's basketball tournament to UMBC. They were invited to the 2015 Women's Basketball Invitational where they lost to Siena in the first round.

== Media ==
All non-televised home games and conference road games will stream on either ESPN3 or AmericaEast.tv. Most road games will stream on the opponents website. All games will have an audio broadcast streamed online through the Pack Network.

== Roster ==
2014–15 Stony Brook Seawolves women's basketball team
Players
Coaches

Pos.	#	Name	Height	Year	Previous school	Hometown
F	1	Marshauna Butler	5 ft 10 in (1.78 m)	Fr	Bowie	Bowie, MD
G	3	Jessica Ogunnorin	6 ft 1 in (1.85 m)	Sr	ACS Athens; UC Riverside	Athens, Greece
G	4	Christa Scognamiglio	5 ft 9 in (1.75 m)	Jr	Pearl River; Fairfield	Orangeburg, NY
G	11	Kori Bayne-Walker	5 ft 5 in (1.65 m)	So	Gates-Chili	Rochester, NY
G	10	Aliza Simpson	5 ft 9 in (1.75 m)	Fr	Londonderry	Londonderry, NH
F	11	Kaylee Kilpatrick	6 ft 4 in (1.93 m)	Sr	Harbour View	Saint John, New Brunswick
F	13	Sabre Parker	6 ft 0 in (1.83 m)	Sr	Harrisburg; North Carolina A&T	Harrisburg, PA
G	14	Miranda Jenkins	5 ft 7 in (1.7 m)	RS Jr	Eastern Guilford	Greensboro, NC
F	20	Brittany Snow	6 ft 0 in (1.83 m)	Jr	Seneca	Shamong, NJ
G	21	Aaliyah Worley	5 ft 11 in (1.8 m)	Fr	George Washington Carver HS of Engineering & Science	Philadelphia, PA
G	23	Kim Hanlon	5 ft 8 in (1.73 m)	Jr	White Plains	White Plains, NY
F	24	Elizabeth Manner	6 ft 1 in (1.85 m)	So	Oakton	Vienna, VA
G	32	Kacie Juday	5 ft 9 in (1.75 m)	Fr	Tipton	Tipton, IN
F	33	Angelica Hauer	6 ft 3 in (1.91 m)	RS Sr	Seton Catholic	Binghamton, NY
G	34	Kristie Costantino	5 ft 5 in (1.65 m)	RS So	Archbishop Carroll	Abington, PA
F	40	Alyssa Coiro	6 ft 1 in (1.85 m)	RS Jr	Rutgers Prep	Califon, NJ

Head coach

- Caroline McCombs (Youngstown State)

Assistant coach(es)

- Chenel Harris (Kent State)
- Adam Call (Oklahoma)
- Kelly Rotan (Junita)

Legend

- (C) Team captain
- (S) Suspended
- (I) Ineligible
- (W) Walk-on
- Injured
- Current redshirt

Roster
Last update: 2014-12-29

== Schedule ==
Date time, TV	Rank^{#}	Opponent^{#}	Result	Record	Site (attendance) city, state
Regular season
11/15/2014*; 7:00 pm, AETV		Saint Peter's	W 56–40	1–0	Island Federal Credit Union Arena (832); Stony Brook, NY
11/18/2014*; 7:00 pm		at Army	L 59–68	1–1	Christl Arena (519); West Point, NY
11/21/2014*; 7:00 pm, AETV		Columbia	W 82–68	2–1	Island Federal Credit Union Arena (407); Stony Brook, NY
11/24/2014*; 7:00 pm, AETV		Bradley	W 79–63	3–1	Island Federal Credit Union Arena (301); Stony Brook, NY
11/28/2014*; 6:30 pm		at No. 8 Duke	L 42–72	3–2	Cameron Indoor Stadium (4,421); Durham, NC
11/30/2014*; 2:00 pm		at Iona	L 62–73	3–3	Hynes Athletic Center (557); New Rochelle, NY
12/03/2014*; 7:00 pm		at St. Francis Brooklyn	L 55–57	3–4	Generoso Pope Athletic Complex (N/A); Brooklyn, NY
12/07/2014*; 2:00 pm		at Iowa State	L 64–74	3–5	Hilton Coliseum (10,978); Ames, IA
12/13/2014*; 2:00 pm		at Morgan State	W 50–48	4–5	Talmadge L. Hill Field House (579); Baltimore, MD
12/18/2014*; 7:00 pm, AETV		Lafayette	W 60–58	5–5	Island Federal Credit Union Arena (401); Stony Brook, NY
12/21/2014*; 1:00 pm		at Wagner	L 70–76	5–6	Spiro Sports Center (533); Staten Island, NY
12/28/2014*; 2:30 pm, AETV		Western Michigan; Seawolves Holiday Classic	W 59–55	6–6	Island Federal Credit Union Arena (796); Stony Brook, NY
12/29/2014*; 2:30 pm, AETV		Norfolk State; Seawolves Holiday Classic	W 52–46	7–6	Island Federal Credit Union Arena (682); Stony Brook, NY
01/03/2015; 12:00 pm, AETV		New Hampshire	L 52–60	7–7 (0–1)	Island Federal Credit Union Arena (3,224); Stony Brook, NY
01/07/2015; 11:00 am, ESPN3		Vermont	W 60–38	8–7 (1–1)	Island Federal Credit Union Arena (1,012); Stony Brook, NY
01/14/2015; 7:00 pm, AETV		at UMBC	W 66–50	9–7 (2–1)	Retriever Activities Center (318); Catonsville, MD
01/17/2015; 2:00 pm, ESPN3		Maine	L 55–58	9–8 (2–2)	Island Federal Credit Union Arena (577); Stony Brook, NY
01/19/2015; 7:00 pm, AETV		at Albany	L 59–69	9–9 (2–3)	SEFCU Arena (1,007); Albany, NY
01/22/2015; 8:00 pm, AETV		at UMass Lowell	W 64–60	10–9 (3–3)	Costello Athletic Center (341); Lowell, MA
01/25/2015; 2:00 pm, AETV		Binghamton	W 67–54	11–9 (3–4)	Island Federal Credit Union Arena (748); Stony Brook, NY
01/29/2015; 7:00 pm, ESPN3		Hartford	L 58–60	11–10 (4–4)	Island Federal Credit Union Arena (501); Stony Brook, NY
02/01/2015; 12:00 pm, AETV		at New Hampshire	W 60–52	12–10 (5–4)	Lundholm Gym (461); Durham, NH
02/04/2015; 7:00 pm, AETV		at Vermont	W 74–62	13–10 (6–4)	Patrick Gym (410); Burlington, VT
02/11/2015; 7:00 pm, AETV		UMBC	W 74–41	14–10 (7–4)	Island Federal Credit Union Arena (472); Stony Brook, NY
02/15/2015; 2:00 pm, AETV		at Maine	L 49–57	14–11 (7–5)	Cross Insurance Center (3,454); Bangor, ME
02/18/2015; 7:00 pm, ESPN3		UMass Lowell	W 62–36	15–11 (8–5)	Island Federal Credit Union Arena (542); Stony Brook, NY
02/22/2015; 4:00 pm, ESPN3		Albany	W 68–64	16–11 (9–5)	Island Federal Credit Union Arena (1,098); Stony Brook, NY
02/26/2015; 7:00 pm		at Binghamton	W 68–59	17–11 (10–5)	Binghamton University Events Center (1,377); Vestal, NY
03/01/2015; 2:00 pm		at Hartford	L 49–56	17–12 (10–6)	Chase Arena at Reich Family Pavilion (1,815); Hartford, CT
2015 America East tournament
03/07/2015; 8:15 pm, ESPN3		vs. UMBC; Quarterfinals	L 47–49	17–13	Binghamton University Events Center (520); Vestal, NY
WBI
03/19/2015*; 7:00 pm, ESPN3		at Siena; First Round	L 46–51	17–14	Alumni Recreation Center (559); Vestal, NY
*Non-conference game. ^{#}Rankings from AP Poll. (#) Tournament seedings in parentheses. All times are in Eastern Time.

== See also ==
- 2014–15 Stony Brook Seawolves men's basketball team
- Stony Brook Seawolves women's basketball
