= 2014–15 NJIT Highlanders women's basketball team =

Intercollegiate basketball season

2014–15 NJIT Highlanders women's basketball
- Conference: Independent
- Record: 12–17
- Head coach: Steve Lanpher (3rd season)
- Assistant coaches: Mark McCaleb (3rd season); La Kea Jones (5th season); Epiphany Smith (3rd season)
- Home arena: Fleisher Center

2014–15 NCAA Division I women's basketball independents standings
	Conf.				Overall
Team	W		L	PCT	W		L	PCT
NJIT		–		–	12	–	17	.414

The 2014–15 NJIT Highlanders women's basketball team represented New Jersey Institute of Technology during the 2014–15 NCAA Division I women's basketball season. The Highlanders, led by third year head coach Steve Lanpher, played their home games at the Fleisher Center and were in their second year as an Independent after the Great West Conference folded. They finished the season 12–17. This was their final season of being independent, as they moved to the Atlantic Sun Conference on July 1, 2015.

== Roster ==
Number	Name	Position	Height	Year	Hometown
1	Alana Dudley	Guard	5–9	Sophomore	Whippany, New Jersey
2	Kim Tullis	Guard	5–9	Senior	Silver Spring, Maryland
3	Alyssa Albanese	Guard	5–3	Senior	Fort Washington, Maryland
4	Ruta Vetra	Guard	6–0	Sophomore	Jūrmala, Latvia
10	Ronni Grandison	Guard/Forward	5–10	Junior	West Chester, Ohio
11	Nicole Matická	Center	6–3	Senior	Bratislava, Slovakia
12	Olivia Dudley	Guard	5–9	Sophomore	Whippany, New Jersey
13	Kelly Guarino	Guard	5–7	Freshman	Thiells, New York
14	Martina Matejčíková	Forward	5–11	Senior	Banská Bystrica, Slovakia
21	Maria Ruban	Center	6–5	RS Freshman	Kyiv, Ukraine
24	Camerin Spahn	Guard	6–0	Sophomore	Freehold, New Jersey
25	Bianca Picard	Guard	5–6	Freshman	Skippack, Pennsylvania
34	Leah Horton	Forward	6–1	RS Sophomore	Macungie, Pennsylvania

== Media ==
NJIT will provide audio of all home contests on Highlanders-All Access and video of select home contests with Matt Provence and Michael Ventola calling the action. Currently no radio is expected for the games. Audio for most road games can be found on the opponents website.

== Schedule ==
Date time, TV	Rank^{#}	Opponent^{#}	Result	Record	Site (attendance) city, state
Regular Season
11/14/2014*; 11:00 am		at New Hampshire	L 56–61	0–1	Lundholm Gym (2,057); Durham, NH
11/16/2014*; 2:00 pm		at Dartmouth	L 63–68 ^{OT}	0–2	Leede Arena (512); Hanover, NH
11/19/2014*; 8:00 pm		at Fairleigh Dickinson	W 68–64	1–2	Rothman Center (185); Teaneck, NJ
11/21/2014*; 7:00 pm		Lehigh	L 54–74	1–3	Fleisher Center (334); Newark, NJ
11/25/2014*; 7:00 pm		St. Francis Brooklyn	W 57–50 ^{OT}	2–3	Fleisher Center (603); Newark, NJ
11/28/2014*; 12:00 pm		at Florida Atlantic; Florida Atlantic Thanksgiving Tournament	W 65–57	3–3	FAU Arena (N/A); Boca Raton, FL
11/29/2014*; 7:00 pm		vs. North Dakota State; Florida Atlantic Thanksgiving Tournament	L 48–60	3–4	FAU Arena (502); Boca Raton, FL
12/02/2014*; 7:00 pm		Wagner	W 60–54	4–4	Fleisher Center (401); Newark, NJ
12/06/2014*; 12:00 pm		Binghamton	W 52–48	5–4	Fleisher Center (504); Newark, NJ
12/09/2014*; 5:30 pm		Hofstra	L 47–62	5–5	Fleisher Center (704); Newark, NJ
12/11/2014*; 7:00 pm		LIU Brooklyn	L 48–57	5–6	Fleisher Center (447); Newark, NJ
12/14/2014*; 2:00 pm, ESPN3		at St. John's	L 42–66	5–7	Carnesecca Arena (760); Queens, NY
12/19/2014*; 7:00 pm		at Seton Hall	L 62–74	5–8	Walsh Gymnasium (402); South Orange, NJ
12/21/2014*; 2:00 pm		at Lafayette	L 50–66	5–9	Kirby Sports Center (432); Easton, PA
12/29/2014*; 7:00 pm		at Clemson	L 47–64	5–10	Littlejohn Coliseum (490); Clemson, SC
01/02/2015*; 1:00 pm		at Wofford	W 76–50	6–10	Benjamin Johnson Arena (109); Spartanburg, SC
01/04/2015*; 2:00 pm		Chicago State	W 59–48	7–10	Fleisher Center (332); Newark, NJ
01/07/2015*; 11:30 am		Texas–Pan American	W 59–54	8–10	Fleisher Center (777); Newark, NJ
01/12/2015*; 7:00 pm		Columbia	L 38–45	8–11	Fleisher Center (400); Newark, NJ
01/18/2015*; 2:00 pm		at Harvard	L 54–66	8–12	Lavietes Pavilion (309); Cambridge, MA
01/18/2015*; 11:30 am		at Brown	L 39–67	8–13	Pizzitola Sports Center (1,024); Providence, RI
01/24/2015*; 2:00 pm		Penn	L 29–59	8–14	Fleisher Center (356); Newark, NJ
02/03/2015*; 5:30 pm		Delaware State	L 54–56 ^{OT}	8–15	Fleisher Center (604); Newark, NJ
02/07/2015*; 2:00 pm		College of St. Joseph	W 92–39	9–15	Fleisher Center (300); Newark, NJ
02/11/2015*; 7:00 pm		Morgan State	W 52–49	10–15	Fleisher Center (440); Newark, NJ
02/16/2015*; 8:00 pm		at Texas–Pan American	L 53–54	10–16	UTPA Fieldhouse (425); Edinburg, TX
02/24/2015*; 7:00 pm		Maryland Eastern Shore	W 70–41	11–16	Fleisher Center (303); Newark, NJ
02/27/2015*; 7:00 pm		St. Joseph's College	W 78–35	12–16	Fleisher Center (300); Newark, NJ
03/03/2015*; 7:00 pm		at UMass Lowell	L 51–60	12–17	Costello Athletic Center (284); Lowell, MA
*Non-conference game. ^{#}Rankings from AP Poll. (#) Tournament seedings in parentheses. All times are in Eastern Time.

== See also ==
- 2014–15 NJIT Highlanders men's basketball team
