= 2014–15 Maine Black Bears women's basketball team =

Intercollegiate basketball season

2014–15 Maine Black Bears women's basketball

America East Regular Season Co-Champions

WNIT, First Round
- Conference: America East Conference
- Record: 23–9 (14–2 America East)
- Head coach: Richard Barron (4th season)
- Assistant coaches: Todd Steelman (3rd season); Amy Vachon (4th season); Sean Smith (2nd season)
- Home arena: Memorial Gym; Cross Insurance Center

2014–15 America East Conference women's basketball standings
	Conf.				Overall
Team	W		L	PCT	W		L	PCT
Albany †	14	–	2	.875	24	–	9	.727
Maine	14	–	2	.875	23	–	9	.719
Stony Brook	10	–	6	.625	17	–	14	.548
New Hampshire	9	–	7	.563	17	–	12	.586
Hartford	8	–	8	.500	16	–	17	.485
UMass Lowell*	7	–	9	.438	14	–	15	.483
UMBC	6	–	10	.375	12	–	19	.387
Vermont	2	–	14	.125	5	–	24	.172
Binghamton	2	–	14	.125	4	–	26	.133
† 2015 America East tournament winner As of March 20, 2015 *ineligible for postseason play due to Div. I transitions Rankings from AP poll

The 2014–15 Maine Black Bears women's basketball team represented the University of Maine in the America East Conference. The Black Bears were led by fourth year head coach Richard Barron and played most of their home games at the Cross Insurance Center with select games being in the Memorial Gym. They finished the season 23–9, 14–2 in America East play to share the America East regular season title with Albany. They advanced to the semifinals of the America East women's tournament, where they lost to Hartford. As champs of the American East Conference who failed to win their conference tournament, they received an automatic bid to the Women's National Invitation Tournament, where they lost to Villanova in the first round.

== Media ==
All home games and conference road games will stream on either ESPN3 or AmericaEast.tv. Most road games will stream on the opponents website. All games will be broadcast on the radio on WGUY and online on the Maine Portal.

== Roster ==
2014–15 Maine Black Bears women's basketball team
Players
Coaches

Pos.	#	Name	Height	Year	Previous school	Hometown
G	3	Chantel Charles	5 ft 10 in (1.78 m)	Jr	Barking Abbey	London, England
G	4	Courtney Anderson	5 ft 6 in (1.68 m)	Sr	Leavitt	Greene, Maine
F	5	Bella Swan	5 ft 11 in (1.8 m)	Jr	Viewmont; Salt Lake CC	Farmington, Utah
G	10	Milica Mitrovic	5 ft 9 in (1.75 m)	Jr	Sports Gymnasium Belgrade	Belgrade, Serbia
F	13	Mikaela Gustafsson	6 ft 2 in (1.88 m)	Jr	Igelstavikens Gymnasium; Telge Basket; Kringlan Basket	Södertälje, Sweden
G	15	Lauren Bodine	5 ft 8 in (1.73 m)	Jr	duPont Manuel	Louisville, Kentucky
G	20	Sophie Weckstrom	5 ft 8 in (1.73 m)	Jr	Brando Gymnasium; Torpan Pojat	Espoo, Finland
F	21	Sheraton Jones	5 ft 10 in (1.78 m)	So	Canyon	Anaheim Hills, California
G	22	Parise Rossignol	5 ft 8 in (1.73 m)	Fr	Van Buren	Van Buren, Maine
F	23	Christiana Gerostergiou	5 ft 10 in (1.78 m)	Fr	Aristotelio; National Team	Thessaloniki, Greece
F	31	Liz Wood	5 ft 10 in (1.78 m)	Jr	Liberty	Catlett, Virginia
F	32	Janessa Fauntroy	6 ft 0 in (1.83 m)	Fr	Gaithersburg	Gaithersburg, Maryland
F	33	Kirsten Johnson	6 ft 2 in (1.88 m)	Fr	Academy of Our Lady Peace	San Diego, California
G	42	Sigi Koizar	5 ft 8 in (1.73 m)	So	Stearns; Billrothgymnasium	Vienna, Austria
F	51	Anna Heise	6 ft 3 in (1.91 m)	Jr	Sportschule Halle	Halle, Germany

Head coach

- Richard Barron, (Kenyon)

Assistant coach(es)

- Todd Steelman (John Brown)
- Amy Vachon (Maine)
- Sean Smith (Rutgers)

Legend

- (C) Team captain
- (S) Suspended
- (I) Ineligible
- (W) Walk-on
- Injured
- Current redshirt

Roster
Last update: 2014-07-10

== Schedule ==
Date time, TV	Rank^{#}	Opponent^{#}	Result	Record	Site (attendance) city, state
Exhibition
11/01/2014*; 4:00 pm		McGill	W 81–41	–	Memorial Gym (696); Orono, Maine
11/10/2014*; 7:00 pm		New Brunswick	W 80–34	–	Cross Insurance Center (1,235); Bangor, Maine
Regular season
11/14/2014*; 7:00 pm		at Bryant	L 52–65	0–1	Chace Athletic Center (432); Smithfield, Rhode Island
11/16/2014*; 7:00 pm		LIU Brooklyn	W 65–59 ^{OT}	1–1	Cross Insurance Center (1,538); Bangor, Maine
11/19/2014*; 7:00 pm		at Massachusetts	L 60–68	1–2	Mullins Center (356); Amherst, Massachusetts
11/23/2014*; 1:00 pm		Sacred Heart	L 58–59	1–3	Cross Insurance Center (1,275); Bangor, Maine
11/29/2014*; 1:00 pm		Brown; Black Bear Thanksgiving Tournament	W 58–53	2–3	Cross Insurance Center (1,325); Bangor, Maine
11/30/2014*; 1:00 pm		Boston College; Black Bear Thanksgiving Tournament	W 69–64 ^{OT}	3–3	Cross Insurance Center (1,239); Bangor, Maine
12/03/2014*; 7:00 pm		at Central Connecticut	W 72–58	4–3	William H. Detrick Gymnasium (436); New Britain, Connecticut
12/07/2014*; 2:00 pm		Harvard	W 65–46	5–3	Cross Insurance Center (1,312); Bangor, Maine
12/10/2014*; 7:00 pm		Dartmouth	W 53–38	6–3	Cross Insurance Center (1,184); Bangor, Maine
12/13/2014*; 1:00 pm		Northeastern	W 60–51	7–3	Cross Insurance Center (1,320); Bangor, Maine
12/19/2014*; 7:00 pm		vs. No. 6 North Carolina; Carolinas Challenge	L 36–65	7–4	Myrtle Beach Convention Center (837); Myrtle Beach, South Carolina
12/21/2014*; 1:00 pm		at William & Mary	W 54–51	8–4	Kaplan Arena (375); Williamsburg, Virginia
01/03/2015; 12:00 pm, ESPN3		Albany	L 43–49	8–5 (0–1)	Cross Insurance Center (2,029); Bangor, Maine
01/07/2015*; 7:00 pm		at Yale	L 55–57	8–6	John J. Lee Amphitheater (144); New Haven, Connecticut
01/10/2015; 2:00 pm		at Hartford	W 68–57	9–6 (1–1)	Chase Arena at Reich Family Pavilion (1,432); West Hartford, Connecticut
01/14/2015; 7:00 pm		UMass Lowell	W 68–54	10–6 (2–1)	Cross Insurance Center (1,250); Bangor, Maine
01/17/2015; 2:00 pm, ESPN3		at Stony Brook	W 58–55	11–6 (3–1)	Island Federal Credit Union Arena (577); Stony Brook, New York
01/19/2015; 3:30 pm		Binghamton	W 70–48	12–6 (4–1)	Cross Insurance Center (2,417); Bangor, Maine
01/22/2015; 5:30 pm		Vermont	W 74–46	13–6 (5–1)	Cross Insurance Center (1,994); Bangor, Maine
01/25/2015; 1:00 pm		at UMBC	W 56–42	14–6 (6–1)	Retriever Activities Center (503); Catonsville, Maryland
01/29/2015; 7:00 pm		New Hampshire	W 87–56	15–6 (7–1)	Cross Insurance Center (1,452); Bangor, Maine
02/01/2015; 1:00 pm		at Albany	W 52–44	16–6 (8–1)	SEFCU Arena (986); Albany, New York
02/08/2015; 2:00 pm		Hartford	W 63–45	17–6 (9–1)	Cross Insurance Center (3,287); Bangor, Maine
02/11/2015; 7:00 pm		at UMass Lowell	W 74–46	18–6 (10–1)	Costello Athletic Center (139); Lowell, Massachusetts
02/15/2015; 2:00 pm		Stony Brook	W 57–49	19–6 (11–1)	Cross Insurance Center (3,454); Bangor, Maine
02/18/2015; 7:00 pm		at Vermont	W 57–54	20–6 (12–1)	Patrick Gym (525); Burlington, Vermont
02/21/2015; 2:00 pm		at Binghamton	W 70–56	21–6 (13–1)	Binghamton University Events Center (1,405); Vestal, New York
02/26/2015; 7:00 pm		UMBC	W 61–41	22–6 (14–1)	Cross Insurance Center (3,004); Bangor, Maine
03/01/2015; 1:00 pm		at New Hampshire	L 47–61	22–7 (14–2)	Lundholm Gym (1,241); Durham, New Hampshire
2015 America East tournament
03/07/2015; 12:00 pm, ESPN3		at Binghamton; Quarterfinals	W 78–71	23–7	Binghamton University Events Center (N/A); Vestal, New York
03/08/2015; 2:00 pm, ESPN3		vs. Hartford; Semifinals	L 54–65	23–8	Binghamton University Events Center (N/A); Vestal, New York
WNIT
03/20/2015*; 7:00 pm		at Villanova; First Round	L 60–71	23–9	The Pavilion (367); Villanova, Pennsylvania
*Non-conference game. ^{#}Rankings from AP Poll. (#) Tournament seedings in parentheses. All times are in Eastern Time.

== See also ==
- 2014–15 Maine Black Bears men's basketball team
