= 2014–15 Binghamton Bearcats women's basketball team =

American college basketball season

2014–15 Binghamton Bearcats women's basketball
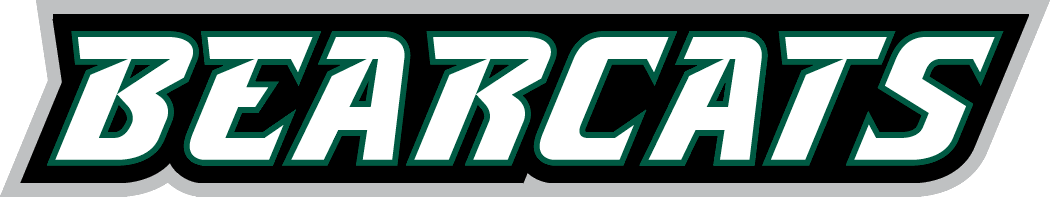
- Conference: America East Conference
- Record: 4–26 (2–14 America East)
- Head coach: Linda Cimino (1st season)
- Assistant coaches: Mike Leflar (1st season); Torey Northup-Jones (1st season); Leah Truncale (6th season)
- Home arena: Binghamton University Events Center

2014–15 America East Conference women's basketball standings
| | Conf. | | | | Overall |
| Team | W | | L | PCT | W | | L | PCT |
|---|---|---|---|---|---|---|---|---|
| Albany † | 14 | – | 2 | .875 | 24 | – | 9 | .727 |
| Maine | 14 | – | 2 | .875 | 23 | – | 9 | .719 |
| Stony Brook | 10 | – | 6 | .625 | 17 | – | 14 | .548 |
| New Hampshire | 9 | – | 7 | .563 | 17 | – | 12 | .586 |
| Hartford | 8 | – | 8 | .500 | 16 | – | 17 | .485 |
| UMass Lowell* | 7 | – | 9 | .438 | 14 | – | 15 | .483 |
| UMBC | 6 | – | 10 | .375 | 12 | – | 19 | .387 |
| Vermont | 2 | – | 14 | .125 | 5 | – | 24 | .172 |
| Binghamton | 2 | – | 14 | .125 | 4 | – | 26 | .133 |
† 2015 America East tournament winner As of March 20, 2015 *ineligible for postseason play due to Div. I transitions Rankings from AP poll

The 2014–15 Binghamton Bearcats women's basketball team represented Binghamton University during the 2014–15 NCAA Division I women's basketball season. The Bearcats were led by first year head coach Linda Cimino and played their home games at Binghamton University Events Center. They were members of the America East Conference. They finished the season 4-26, 2-14 in America East play in a tie for an eighth-place finish. They lost in the quarterfinals of the 2015 America East women's basketball tournament to Maine.

== Media ==
All home games and conference road games will stream on either ESPN3 or AmericaEast.tv. Most road games will stream on the opponents website. All games will be broadcast on the radio on WNBF and streamed online.

== Roster ==
2014–15 Binghamton Bearcats women's basketball team
Players
Coaches

| Pos. | # | Name | Height | Year | Previous school | Hometown |
|---|---|---|---|---|---|---|
| G | 23 | Kim Albrecht | 5 ft 7 in (1.7 m) | Jr | Deerfield | Deerfield, WI |
| G | 25 | Asia Baker | 5 ft 10 in (1.78 m) | Fr | Plymouth Whitemarsk | Plymouth Meeting, PA |
| F | 5 | Alyssa James | 6 ft 1 in (1.85 m) | So | St. Mary's (Caldwell) | Rosedale, NY |
| F | 34 | Kylie Libby | 6 ft 0 in (1.83 m) | So | Cheverus | South Portland, ME |
| C | 44 | Jessa Molina | 6 ft 1 in (1.85 m) | Jr | Wichita South | Wichita, KS |
| F | 24 | Kristin Ross | 6 ft 0 in (1.83 m) | So | Gorham | Gorham, ME |
| G | 10 | Jasmine Sina | 5 ft 5 in (1.65 m) | Fr | Gill-St. Bernards | Lake Hoptacong, NJ |
| G | 32 | Gintare Surdokaite | 5 ft 10 in (1.78 m) | Sr | Lockport Township | Lockport, IL |
| F | 13 | Sherae Swinson | 6 ft 0 in (1.83 m) | Sr | Archbishop Spalding | Odenton, MD |
| G | 11 | Imani Watkins | 5 ft 8 in (1.73 m) | Fr | Wingate Andrews | High Point, NC |
| G | 3 | Megan Goldstein | 5 ft 7 in (1.7 m) | Fr | Tottenville | Staten Island, NY |

Head coach

- Linda Cimino, (Adelphi)

Assistant coach(es)

- Mike Leflar, (Boston College)
- Torey Northup-Jones, (Caldwell)
- Leah Truncale, (Binghamton)

Legend

- (C) Team captain
- (S) Suspended
- (I) Ineligible
- (W) Walk-on
- Injured
- Current redshirt

Roster
Last update: 2014-10-15

== Schedule ==
| Date time, TV | Rank^{#} | Opponent^{#} | Result | Record | Site (attendance) city, state |
Exhibition
| 11/07/2014*; 5:30 pm | | Mansfield | W 83–60 | – | Binghamton University Events Center (N/A); Vestal, NY |
Regular season
| 11/14/2014*; 6:00 pm | | at Akron; Akron Tournament | L 49–80 | 0–1 | James A. Rhodes Arena (1,205); Akron, OH |
| 11/15/2014*; 7:00 pm | | vs. Delaware State; Akron Tournament | W 90–84 | 1–1 | James A. Rhodes Arena (278); Akron, OH |
| 11/22/2014*; 7:00 pm | | Xavier | L 71–89 | 1–2 | Binghamton University Events Center (1,378); Vestal, NY |
| 11/26/2014*; 2:00 pm | | Niagara | L 52–63 | 1–3 | Binghamton University Events Center (1,392); Vestal, NY |
| 11/28/2014*; 2:00 pm, ESPN3 | | at St. John's | L 51–67 | 1–4 | Carnesecca Arena (537); Queens, NY |
| 11/30/2014*; 1:00 pm | | at St. Bonaventure | L 54–72 | 1–5 | Reilly Center (408); Olean, NY |
| 12/06/2014*; 12:00 pm | | at NJIT | L 48–52 | 1–6 | Fleisher Center (504); Newark, NJ |
| 12/10/2014*; 7:00 pm | | at Colgate | L 55–74 | 1–7 | Cotterell Court (322); Hamilton, NY |
| 12/11/2014*; 7:00 pm | | at Canisius | L 75–91 | 1–8 | Koessler Athletic Center (609); Buffalo, NY |
| 12/13/2014*; 2:00 pm | | at Princeton | L 58–96 | 1–9 | Jadwin Gymnasium (558); Princeton, NJ |
| 12/19/2014*; 7:00 pm | | Siena | L 53–62 | 1–10 | Binghamton University Events Center (1,213); Vestal, NY |
| 12/21/2014*; 2:00 pm | | Rider | W 72–67 | 2–10 | Binghamton University Events Center (1,280); Vestal, NY |
| 12/28/2014*; 2:00 pm | | Bucknell | L 57–68 | 2–11 | Binghamton University Events Center (1,153); Vestal, NY |
| 01/03/2015; 2:00 pm | | UMass Lowell | W 65–64 | 3–11 (1–0) | Binghamton University Events Center (1,127); Vestal, NY |
| 01/06/2015; 7:00 pm | | at Hartford | L 44–59 | 3–12 (1–1) | Chase Arena at Reich Family Pavilion (1,004); Hartford, CT |
| 01/10/2015; 12:00 pm | | Vermont | W 73–62 | 4–12 (2–1) | Binghamton University Events Center (N/A); Vestal, NY |
| 01/14/2015; 7:00 pm | | Albany | L 49–82 | 4–13 (2–2) | Binghamton University Events Center (1,235); Vestal, NY |
| 01/17/2015; 7:00 pm | | at New Hampshire | L 68–73 | 4–14 (2–3) | Lundholm Gym (471); Durham, NH |
| 01/19/2015; 3:30 pm | | at Maine | L 48–70 | 4–15 (2–4) | Cross Insurance Center (2,417); Bangor, ME |
| 01/25/2015; 2:00 pm | | at Stony Brook | L 54–67 | 4–16 (2–5) | Island Federal Credit Union Arena (748); Stony Brook, NY |
| 01/28/2015; 7:00 pm | | UMBC | L 55–71 | 4–17 (2–6) | Binghamton University Events Center (1,349); Vestal, NY |
| 02/01/2015; 1:00 pm | | at UMass Lowell | L 49–66 | 4–18 (2–7) | Costello Athletic Center (119); Lowell, MA |
| 02/04/2015; 7:00 pm | | Hartford | L 46–51 | 4–19 (2–8) | Binghamton University Events Center (1,099); Vestal, NY |
| 02/07/2015; 2:00 pm | | at Vermont | L 66–72 | 4–20 (2–9) | Patrick Gym (564); Burlington, VT |
| 02/11/2015; 12:00 pm | | at Albany | L 53–75 | 4–21 (2–10) | SEFCU Arena (1,925); Albany, NY |
| 02/14/2015; 2:00 pm, ESPN3 | | New Hampshire | L 58–76 | 4–22 (2–11) | Binghamton University Events Center (1,571); Vestal, NY |
| 02/21/2015; 2:00 pm | | Maine | L 56–70 | 4–23 (2–12) | Binghamton University Events Center (1,405); Vestal, NY |
| 02/26/2015; 7:00 pm | | Stony Brook | L 59–68 | 4–24 (2–13) | Binghamton University Events Center (1,377); Vestal, NY |
| 03/01/2015; 7:00 pm | | at UMBC | L 50–73 | 4–25 (2–14) | Retriever Activities Center (376); Catonsville, MD |
2015 America East tournament
| 03/07/2015; 12:00 pm, ESPN3 | | Maine; Quarterfinals | L 71–78 | 4–26 | Binghamton University Events Center (N/A); Vestal, NY |
*Non-conference game. ^{#}Rankings from AP Poll. (#) Tournament seedings in parentheses. All times are in Eastern Time.

== See also ==
- 2014–15 Binghamton Bearcats men's basketball team
