= 2014–15 UMass Lowell River Hawks women's basketball team =

Intercollegiate basketball season

2014–15 UMass Lowell River Hawks women's basketball
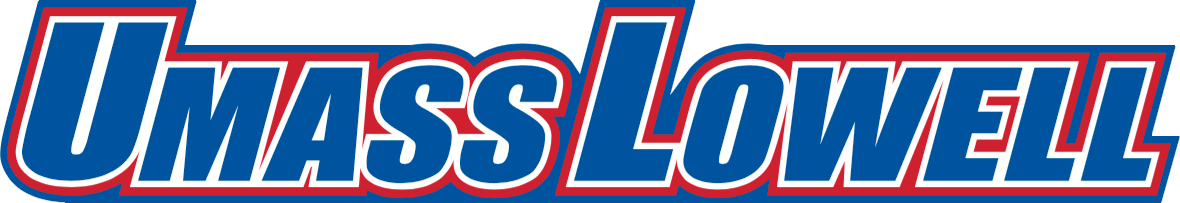
- Conference: America East Conference
- Record: 14–15 (7–9 America East)
- Head coach: Jenerrie Harris (1st season)
- Assistant coaches: Kara Kelly (1st season); Chanté Bonds (1st season); Kerry Cashman (1st season)
- Home arena: Costello Athletic Center; Tsongas Center at UMass Lowell

2014–15 America East Conference women's basketball standings
| | Conf. | | | | Overall |
| Team | W | | L | PCT | W | | L | PCT |
|---|---|---|---|---|---|---|---|---|
| Albany † | 14 | – | 2 | .875 | 24 | – | 9 | .727 |
| Maine | 14 | – | 2 | .875 | 23 | – | 9 | .719 |
| Stony Brook | 10 | – | 6 | .625 | 17 | – | 14 | .548 |
| New Hampshire | 9 | – | 7 | .563 | 17 | – | 12 | .586 |
| Hartford | 8 | – | 8 | .500 | 16 | – | 17 | .485 |
| UMass Lowell* | 7 | – | 9 | .438 | 14 | – | 15 | .483 |
| UMBC | 6 | – | 10 | .375 | 12 | – | 19 | .387 |
| Vermont | 2 | – | 14 | .125 | 5 | – | 24 | .172 |
| Binghamton | 2 | – | 14 | .125 | 4 | – | 26 | .133 |
† 2015 America East tournament winner As of March 20, 2015 *ineligible for postseason play due to Div. I transitions Rankings from AP poll

The 2014–15 UMass Lowell River Hawks women's basketball team represented the University of Massachusetts Lowell in the America East Conference. The River Hawks were led by first year head coach Jenerrie Harris and played most their home games in the Costello Athletic Center while select games were played in the Tsongas Center at UMass Lowell. As part of their transition to Division I, they were ineligible for post season play until the 2017–18 season. They finished the season 14–15, 7–9 in America East play for a sixth-place finish.

== Media ==
All non-televised home games and conference road games will stream on either ESPN3 or AmericaEast.tv. Most road games will stream on the opponents website.

== Roster ==
2014–15 UMass Lowell River Hawks women's basketball team
Players
Coaches

| Pos. | # | Name | Height | Year | Previous school | Hometown |
|---|---|---|---|---|---|---|
| G | 1 | Kayla Gibbs | 5 ft 11 in (1.8 m) | Fr | Teaneck High School | Teaneck, N.J. |
| G | 4 | Brianna Rudolph | 5 ft 9 in (1.75 m) | Fr | St. Mary's High School | Lynn, Mass. |
| G | 5 | Jontay Walton | 5 ft 8 in (1.73 m) | Fr | Cardinal O'Hara High School | Buffalo, N.Y. |
| G | 11 | Brittany Lomanno | 5 ft 3 in (1.6 m) | So | Billerica Memorial | Billerica, Mass. |
| G | 12 | Asia Mitchell | 5 ft 8 in (1.73 m) | So | Oliver Ames | Roxbury, Mass. |
| G | 13 | Shannon Samuels | 5 ft 5 in (1.65 m) | Sr | Windsor High School | Windsor, Conn. |
| F | 21 | Nicole Riddick | 5 ft 8 in (1.73 m) | Fr | Colonie Central High School | Albany, N.Y. |
| G | 23 | Jasmine McRoy | 5 ft 9 in (1.75 m) | Sr | Watkins Mill High | Gaithersburg, MD |
| G | 24 | Melissa Frase | 5 ft 7 in (1.7 m) | Jr | Kennett | Tamworth, N.H. |
| G | 31 | Priscilla Dunphy | 5 ft 10 in (1.78 m) | So | La Salle Academy | Barrington, R.I. |
| F | 32 | Lauren Parra | 6 ft 1 in (1.85 m) | So | St. John the Baptist | Islip, N.Y. |
| F | 33 | Lindsey Doucette | 6 ft 2 in (1.88 m) | Jr | Hopkinton | Hopkinton, Mass. |
| G | 34 | Nicole Hayner | 5 ft 9 in (1.75 m) | So | Bishop Guertin | Bedford, N.H. |

Head coach

Jenerrie Harris, (Kentucky)

Assistant coach(es)

Kara Kelly
Chanté Bonds
Kerry Cashman, (Boston University)

Legend

- (C) Team captain
- (S) Suspended
- (I) Ineligible
- (W) Walk-on
- Injured
- Current redshirt

Roster

== Schedule ==
| Date time, TV | Rank^{#} | Opponent^{#} | Result | Record | Site (attendance) city, state |
Regular season
| 11/14/2014*; 6:00 pm | | at No. 3 Notre Dame | L 51–105 | 0–1 | Edmund P. Joyce Center (8,659); South Bend, IN |
| 11/19/2014*; 7:00 pm | | Rhode Island | L 66–75 | 0–2 | Costello Athletic Center (411); Lowell, MA |
| 11/22/2014*; 2:00 pm | | Central Connecticut | L 58–81 | 0–3 | Costello Athletic Center (117); Lowell, MA |
| 11/24/2014*; 7:00 pm | | Mount Ida | W 93–41 | 1–3 | Costello Athletic Center (163); Lowell, MA |
| 11/30/2014*; 2:00 pm | | Fairleigh Dickinson | W 78–67 | 2–3 | Costello Athletic Center (302); Lowell, MA |
| 12/03/2014*; 7:00 pm | | at Columbia | W 69–59 | 3–3 | Levien Gymnasium (331); New York City, NY |
| 12/06/2014*; 12:00 pm | | at Providence | L 54–66 | 3–4 | Alumni Hall (347); Providence, RI |
| 12/08/2014*; 7:00 pm | | Yale | W 80–72 | 4–4 | Costello Athletic Center (148); Lowell, MA |
| 12/10/2014*; 5:30 pm | | Bryant | W 86–85 | 5–4 | Costello Athletic Center (732); Lowell, MA |
| 12/19/2014*; 6:30 pm | | at No. 13 Duke | L 48–95 | 5–5 | Cameron Indoor Stadium (3,804); Durham, NC |
| 12/22/2014*; 11:15 am | | at Holy Cross | L 63–78 | 5–6 | Hart Center (2,824); Worcester, MA |
| 12/30/2014*; 7:00 pm | | St. Francis Brooklyn | W 64–62 | 6–6 | Costello Athletic Center (517); Lowell, MA |
| 01/03/2015; 2:00 pm | | at Binghamton | L 64–65 | 6–7 (0–1) | Binghamton University Events Center (1,127); Vestal, NY |
| 01/08/2015; 11:30 am | | UMBC | W 75–62 | 7–7 (1–1) | Tsongas Center (924); Lowell, MA |
| 01/11/2015; 7:00 pm | | Albany | L 50–78 | 7–8 (1–2) | Costello Athletic Center (157); Lowell, MA |
| 01/14/2015; 7:00 pm | | at Maine | L 54–68 | 7–9 (1–3) | Cross Insurance Center (1,250); Bangor, ME |
| 01/17/2015; 2:00 pm | | Hartford | L 56–67 | 7–10 (1–4) | Costello Athletic Center (303); Lowell, MA |
| 01/19/2015; 1:00 pm | | at New Hampshire | L 51–58 | 7–11 (1–5) | Lundholm Gym (407); Durham, NH |
| 01/22/2015; 8:00 pm | | Stony Brook | L 60–64 | 7–12 (1–6) | Costello Athletic Center (341); Lowell, MA |
| 01/25/2015; 4:30 pm, ESPN3 | | Vermont | W 72–63 | 8–12 (2–6) | Tsongas Center (3,971); Lowell, MA |
| 02/01/2015; 2:00 pm | | Binghamton | W 66–49 | 9–12 (3–6) | Costello Athletic Center (119); Lowell, MA |
| 02/04/2015; 7:00 pm | | at UMBC | W 84–78 | 10–12 (4–6) | Retriever Activities Center (397); Catonsville, MD |
| 02/07/2015; 5:00 pm | | at Albany | L 57–93 | 10–13 (4–7) | SEFCU Arena (3,471); Albany, NY |
| 02/11/2015; 7:00 pm | | Maine | L 46–74 | 10–14 (4–8) | Costello Athletic Center (139); Lowell, MA |
| 02/14/2015; 2:00 pm | | at Hartford | W 65–62 | 11–14 (5–8) | Chase Arena at Reich Family Pavilion (1,429); Hartford, CT |
| 02/18/2015; 7:00 pm | | at Stony Brook | L 36–62 | 11–15 (5–9) | Island Federal Credit Union Arena (542); Stony Brook, NY |
| 02/21/2015; 2:00 pm | | New Hampshire | W 70–65 | 12–15 (6–9) | Tsongas Center (1,950); Lowell, MA |
| 02/26/2015; 7:00 pm | | at Vermont | W 72–64 | 13–15 (7–9) | Patrick Gym (570); Burlington, VT |
| 03/03/2015*; 7:00 pm | | NJIT | W 60–51 | 14–15 | Costello Athletic Center (284); Lowell, MA |
*Non-conference game. ^{#}Rankings from AP Poll. (#) Tournament seedings in parentheses. All times are in Eastern Time.

== See also ==
- 2014–15 UMass Lowell River Hawks men's basketball team
- UMass Lowell River Hawks women's basketball
