= 2014–15 Princeton Tigers women's basketball team =

Intercollegiate basketball season

2014–15 Princeton Tigers women's basketball

Cancún Challenge Mayan Division Champions Fordham Holiday Classic Champions Ivy League Champions

NCAA Women's Tournament, round of 32
- Conference: Ivy League

Ranking
- Coaches: No. 13
- AP: No. 13
- Record: 31–1 (14–0 Ivy)
- Head coach: Courtney Banghart (8th season)
- Assistant coaches: Milena Flores; Megan Griffith
- Home arena: Jadwin Gymnasium

2014–15 Ivy League women's basketball standings
	Conf.				Overall
Team	W		L	PCT	W		L	PCT
No. 13 Princeton^{†}	14	–	0	1.000	31	–	1	.969
Penn	11	–	3	.786	21	–	9	.700
Harvard	7	–	7	.500	14	–	14	.500
Yale	7	–	7	.500	13	–	15	.464
Cornell	6	–	8	.429	15	–	13	.536
Dartmouth	5	–	9	.357	14	–	14	.500
Brown	4	–	10	.286	10	–	18	.357
Columbia	2	–	12	.143	8	–	20	.286
† Ivy League winner Rankings from AP Poll

The 2014–15 Princeton Tigers women's basketball team represented Princeton University during the 2014–15 NCAA Division I women's basketball season. The Tigers, led by eighth-year head coach Courtney Banghart, played their home games at Jadwin Gymnasium and were members of the Ivy League.

The Tigers finished the season 31–1, 14–0 to win the Ivy League regular season title, earning an automatic trip to the 2015 NCAA Division I women's basketball tournament, where they lost to Maryland in the second round. The Tigers' No. 13 rankings in both the Associated Press Top-25 and USA Today Coaches polls are the highest in Ivy League history. Princeton's No. 8 seed is the best an Ivy program has ever earned, and the Tigers' first round win over Green Bay was just the second NCAA victory for an Ivy team, joining No. 16 Harvard's upset over No. 1 Stanford in 1998.

In the January 10 conference opener against Penn, senior guard Blake Dietrick became the 22nd player in program history to surpass the 1,000-point mark. She finished the season ranked 11th in scoring with 1,233 points.

== Roster ==
2014–15 Princeton Tigers women's basketball team
Players
Coaches

Pos.	#	Name	Height	Year	Hometown
G	14	Amanda Berntsen	5 ft 9 in (1.75 m)	Jr	Chatham, New Jersey
G	2	Taylor Brown	5 ft 8 in (1.73 m)	So	Woodstock, Georgia
G	11	Blake Dietrick (C)	5 ft 10 in (1.78 m)	Sr	Wellesley, Massachusetts
G	24	Kenya Holland	5 ft 8 in (1.73 m)	Fr	Stafford, Virginia
G	34	Michelle Miller	5 ft 10 in (1.78 m)	Jr	Pasadena, California
F	44	Jackie Reyneke	6 ft 4 in (1.93 m)	So	Saddle River, New Jersey
F	45	Leslie Robinson	6 ft 0 in (1.83 m)	Fr	Corvallis, Oregon
G	5	Alex Rodgers	5 ft 9 in (1.75 m)	Sr	Mouth of Wilson, Virginia
C	23	Jess Shivers	6 ft 3 in (1.91 m)	Sr	Eugene, Oregon
F	25	Mariah Smith (C)	6 ft 0 in (1.83 m)	Sr	Peoria, Illinois
G	13	Vanessa Smith	6 ft 1 in (1.85 m)	So	Twinsburg, Ohio
G/F	15	Annie Tarakchian	6 ft 0 in (1.83 m)	Jr	West Hills, California
G	32	Tia Weledji	5 ft 10 in (1.78 m)	Fr	Overland Park, Kansas
F	21	Alex Wheatley	6 ft 2 in (1.88 m)	Jr	Holland, Pennsylvania
F	22	Taylor Williams	6 ft 3 in (1.91 m)	Jr	Warren, Ohio

Head coach

- Courtney Banghart (Dartmouth)

Assistant coach(es)

- Milena Flores (Stanford)
- Megan Griffith (Columbia)

Legend

- (C) Team captain
- (S) Suspended
- (I) Ineligible
- (W) Walk-on
- Injured
- Current redshirt

Roster
Last update: March 10, 2015

== Schedule ==
Date time, TV	Rank^{#}	Opponent^{#}	Result	Record	Site (attendance) city, state
Regular season
11/14/2014*		at Pittsburgh	W 59–43	1–0	Peterson Events Center (3,798); Pittsburgh, PA
11/16/2014*		at Duquesne	W 79–62	2–0	Palumbo Center (732); Pittsburgh, PA
11/19/2014*		Drexel	W 59–43	3–0	Jadwin Gymnasium (568); Princeton, NJ
11/23/2014*		at American	W 63–56	4–0	Bender Arena (1,628); Washington, D.C.
11/27/2014*		vs. Wake Forest; Cancún Challenge Mayan Division	W 72–55	5–0	Hard Rock Resort (650); Playa del Carmen, Mexico
11/28/2014*		vs. Montana; Cancún Challenge Mayan Division	W 80–55	6–0	Hard Rock Resort (650); Playa del Carmen, Mexico
11/29/2014*		vs. Charlotte; Cancún Challenge Mayan Division	W 73–43	7–0	Hard Rock Resort (650); Playa del Carmen, Mexico
12/06/2014*		Georgetown	W 83–54	8–0	Jadwin Gymnasium (769); Princeton, NJ
12/09/2014*		at Michigan	W 85–55	9–0	Crisler Arena (1,193); Ann Arbor, MI
12/13/2014*		Binghamton	W 96–58	10–0	Jadwin Gymnasium (558); Princeton, NJ
12/16/2014*		at Delaware	W 87–59	11–0	Bob Carpenter Center (1,697); Wilmington, DE
12/19/2014*		Portland State	W 104–33	12–0	Jadwin Gymnasium (645); Princeton, NJ
12/21/2014*		at Monmouth	W 84–53	13–0	Multipurpose Activity Center (478); West Long Branch, NJ
12/29/2014*		vs. Hartford; Fordham Holiday Classic semifinals	W 64–51	14–0	Rose Hill Gymnasium (647); Bronx, NY
12/30/2014*		at Fordham; Fordham Holiday Classic championship	W 67–53	15–0	Rose Hill Gymnasium (510); Bronx, NY
01/05/2015*	No. 22	at Hampton	W 75–63	16–0	Hampton Convocation Center (1,500); Hampton, VA
01/10/2015	No. 22	Penn	W 83–54	17–0 (1–0)	Jadwin Gymnasium (1,081); Princeton, NJ
01/30/2015	No. 19	at Harvard	W 96–46	18–0 (2–0)	Lavietes Pavilion (1,117); Cambridge, MA
01/31/2015	No. 19	at Dartmouth	W 83–65	19–0 (3–0)	Leede Arena (1,005); Hanover, NH
02/06/2015	No. 18	Columbia	W 83–44	20–0 (4–0)	Jadwin Gymnasium (1,254); Princeton, NJ
02/07/2015	No. 18	Cornell	W 75–47	21–0 (5–0)	Jadwin Gymnasium (1,399); Princeton, NJ
02/13/2015	No. 16	at Brown	W 86–58	22–0 (6–0)	Pizzitola Sports Center (540); Providence, RI
02/14/2015	No. 16	at Yale	W 56–50	23–0 (7–0)	John J. Lee Amphitheater (287); New Haven, CT
02/20/2015	No. 16	Dartmouth	W 70–31	24–0 (8–0)	Jadwin Gymnasium (1,066); Princeton, NJ
02/21/2015	No. 16	Harvard	W 78–57	25–0 (9–0)	Jadwin Gymnasium (1,502); Princeton, NJ
02/27/2015	No. 14	Yale	W 67–49	26–0 (10–0)	Jadwin Gymnasium (1,507); Princeton, NJ
02/28/2015	No. 14	Brown	W 79–67	27–0 (11–0)	Jadwin Gymnasium (2,097); Princeton, NJ
03/06/2015	No. 13	at Cornell	W 70–37	28–0 (12–0)	Newman Arena (724); Ithaca, NY
03/07/2015	No. 13	at Columbia	W 63–44	29–0 (13–0)	Levien Gymnasium (1,038); New York City, NY
03/10/2015	No. 13	at Penn	W 55–42	30–0 (14–0)	Palestra (N/A); Philadelphia, PA
2015 NCAA Women's Tournament
03/21/2015*	(8 S) No. 13	vs. (9 S) Green Bay; First Round	W 80–70	31–0	Xfinity Center (N/A); College Park, MD
03/23/2015*	(8 S) No. 13	at (1 S) No. 4 Maryland; Second Round	L 70–85	31–1	Xfinity Center (7,794); College Park, MD
*Non-conference game. ^{#}Rankings from AP Poll. (#) Tournament seedings in parentheses. S=Spokane region.

== Rankings ==
Ranking movement Legend: ██ Increase in ranking. ██ Decrease in ranking. ██ Not ranked the previous week. RV=Received votes.
Poll	Pre	Wk 2	Wk 3	Wk 4	Wk 5	Wk 6	Wk 7	Wk 8	Wk 9	Wk 10	Wk 11	Wk 12	Wk 13	Wk 14	Wk 15	Wk 16	Wk 17	Wk 18	Final
AP	NR	NR	NR	RV	RV	RV	RV	RV	22	19	19	19	18	16	16	14	13	13	13
Coaches	NR	NR	NR	NR	NR	NR	NR	RV	24	23	21	21	20	18	17	14	14	13	13

== See also ==
- 2014–15 Princeton Tigers men's basketball team
