= Jenerrie Harris =

American basketball player and coach

Biographical details
- Education: Kentucky

Playing career
- 2000–2004: Kentucky

Coaching career (HC unless noted)
- 2005–2006: Longwood (assistant)
- 2006–2009: Wright State (assistant)
- 2009–2013: Navy (assistant)
- 2013–2014: Navy (AHC)
- 2014–2018: UMass Lowell
- 2021–2022: Army (assistant)

Head coaching record
- Overall: 25–91

Jenerrie Harris is an American women's basketball coach and former player.

== Career ==
She was the head coach of the UMass Lowell River Hawks women's basketball team, which plays in the America East Conference, from being hired on June 26, 2014, until March 5, 2018, when her contract was not renewed. Prior to being hired by the River Hawks, Harris was an assistant coach with the Navy Midshipmen women's basketball program. She also an assistant coach at Longwood University and Wright State University.

Harris played college basketball under Bernadette Mattox with the Kentucky Wildcats women's basketball team. At Kentucky, she was originally a walk-on but eventually earned a scholarship. She graduated in 2004 with a Bachelor of Arts in sociology. She is originally from Muskegon, Michigan.

== Career statistics ==
=== College ===
Year	Team	GP	GS	MPG	FG%	3P%	FT%	RPG	APG	SPG	BPG	TO	PPG
2000–01	Kentucky	7	-	-	25.0	0.0	0.0	0.1	0.0	0.0	0.0	-	0.3
2001–02	Kentucky	11	-	-	28.6	0.0	0.0	0.8	0.0	0.1	0.0	-	0.4
2002–03	Kentucky	17	-	13.5	30.8	0.0	81.8	1.8	0.6	0.4	0.1	1.2	1.5
2003–04	Kentucky	10	-	4.8	25.0	0.0	14.3	1.0	0.4	0.0	0.1	0.1	0.3
Career		45	-	10.3	29.3	0.0	55.6	1.1	0.3	0.2	0.1	0.8	0.8
Statistics retrieved from Sports-Reference.

== Head coaching record ==
Record table
Season	Team	Overall	Conference	Standing	Postseason
UMass Lowell River Hawks (America East Conference) (2014–2018)
2014–15	UMass Lowell	14–15	7–9	6th	
2015–16	UMass Lowell	4–24	1–15	9th	
2016–17	UMass Lowell	3–26	0–16	9th	
2017–18	UMass Lowell	4–26	1–15	9th	
UMass Lowell:		25–91	9–55		
Total:		25–91			
National champion Postseason invitational champion Conference regular season champion Conference regular season and conference tournament champion Division regular season champion Division regular season and conference tournament champion Conference tournament champion
