= UMass Lowell River Hawks women's basketball =

Basketball team at the University of Massachusetts Lowell

UMass Lowell River Hawks
2026–27 UMass Lowell River Hawks women's basketball team
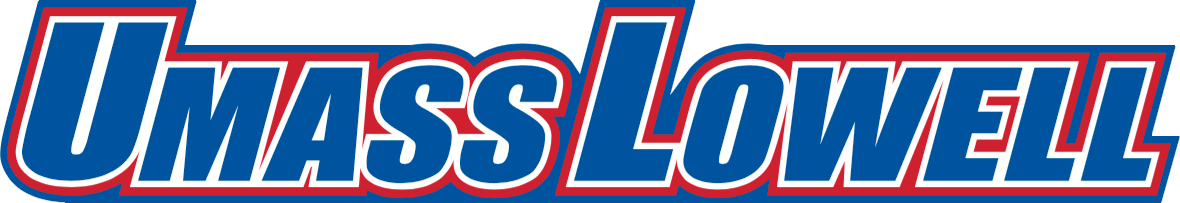
- University: University of Massachusetts Lowell
- Head coach: Brianna Finch (1st season)
- Location: Lowell, Massachusetts
- Arena: Costello Athletic Center; Tsongas Center (capacity: Costello Athletic Center 1,100; Tsongas Center 7,649)
- Conference: America East
- Nickname: River Hawks
- Colors: Blue, white, and red

NCAA Division II tournament Sweet Sixteen
- 1993

NCAA Division II tournament appearances
- 1991, 1993, 1994, 1995, 1997, 1998, 2000, 2003

Conference tournament champions
- ECAC: 1990; NECC: 1991, 1993, 1995, 1997, 1998, 2000

Conference regular-season champions
- NECC: 1991, 1993, 1995, 2000

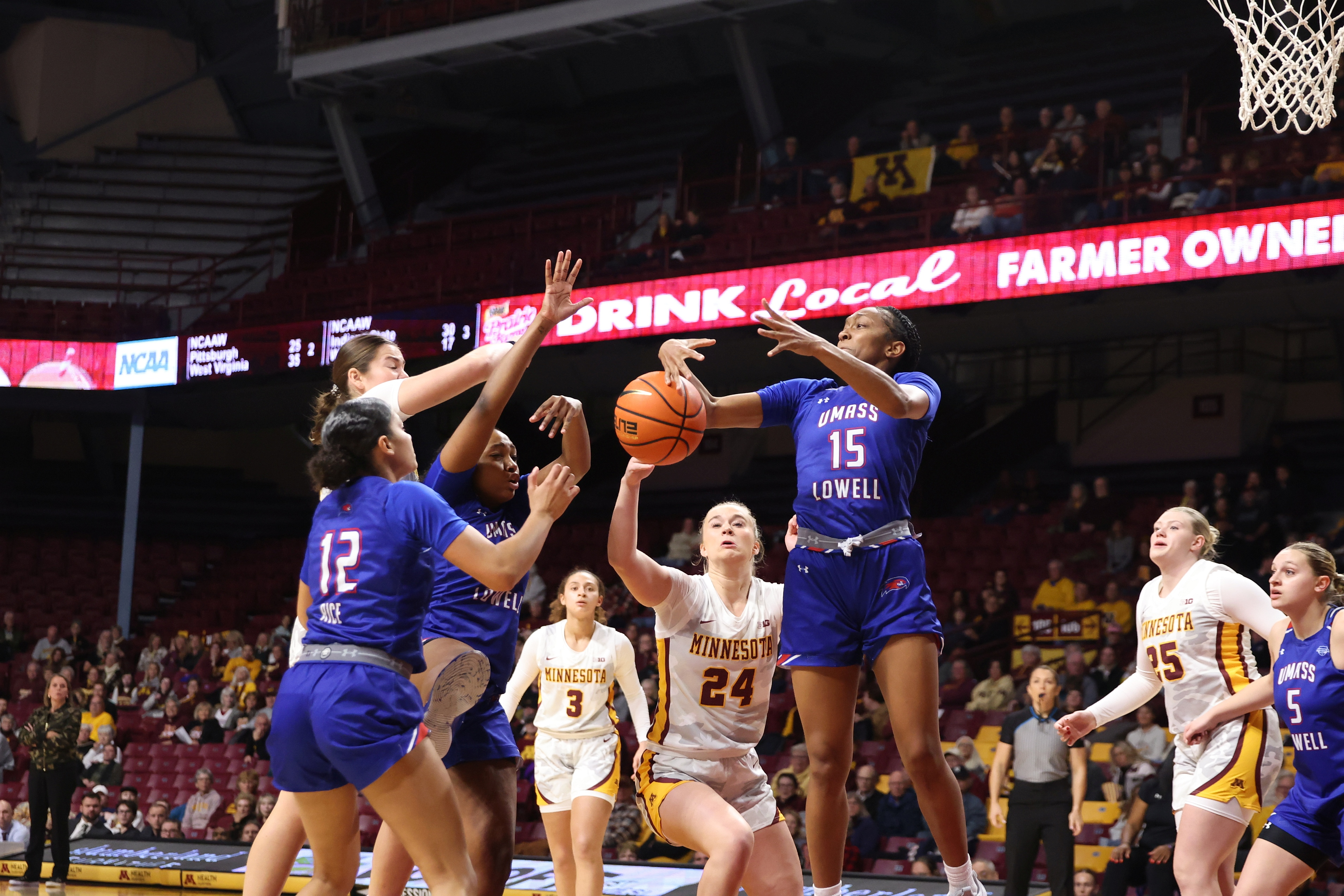
UMass Lowell women's basketball game vs Minnesota in 2024

The UMass Lowell River Hawks women's basketball team represents the University of Massachusetts Lowell in Lowell, Massachusetts, United States. The River Hawks started play in NCAA Division I beginning in 2013 and joined the America East Conference. As part of their transition from Division II to Division I, they were not eligible for postseason play until the 2017–2018 season.

== Season-by-season record ==
Season	Coach	Overall	Conference	Standing	Postseason
Pat McCoy (Independent) (1975–1976)
1975–76	Pat McCoy	8–4			
Deborah Preis (Independent) (1976–1978)
1976–77	Deborah Preis	12–3			
1977–78	Deborah Preis	8–9			
Barbara Ryder (Independent) (1978–1980)
1978–79	Barbara Ryder	2–16			
1979–80	Barbara Ryder	2–14			
Carol Mastacouris (Independent) (1980–1982)
1980–81	Carol Mastacouris	10–13			
1981–82	Carol Mastacouris	10–13			
Carol Mastacouris (New England Collegiate Conference) (1982–1985)
1982–83	Carol Mastacouris	7–18	2–4		
1983–84	Carol Mastacouris	7–21	3–11		
1984–85	Carol Mastacouris	1–24	0–14		
Kathy O’Neil (New England Collegiate Conference) (1985–2000)
1985–86	Kathy O’Neil	1–24	1–14		
1986–87	Kathy O’Neil	11–16	7–7		
1987–88	Kathy O’Neil	10–16	3–9		
1988–89	Kathy O’Neil	15–13	7–7		
1989–90	Kathy O’Neil	19–12	9–5		
1990–91	Kathy O’Neil	22–9	14–0		NCAA Division II Regional semifinals
1991–92	Kathy O’Neil	21–9	11–3		
1992–93	Kathy O’Neil	24–6	13–1		NCAA Division II Sweet Sixteen
1993–94	Kathy O’Neil	23–8	13–3		NCAA Division II Regional Semifinals
1994–95	Kathy O’Neil	23–7	13–3		NCAA Division II First Round
1995–96	Kathy O’Neil	20–8	16–4		
1996–97	Kathy O’Neil	25–6	16–2		NCAA Division II Regional Semifinals
1997–98	Kathy O’Neil	19–10	12–4		NCAA Division II First Round
1998–99	Kathy O’Neil	14–13	10–8		
1999–2000	Kathy O’Neil	19–10	13–3		NCAA Division II First Round
Kathy O’Neil (Northeast-10 Conference) (2000–2011)
2000–01	Kathy O’Neil	11–16	8–14	11th	
2001–02	Kathy O’Neil	15–13	11–11	T-7th	
2002–03	Kathy O’Neil	23–8	17–5	2nd	NCAA Division II First Round
2003–04	Kathy O’Neil	13–15	9–13	T-9th	
2004–05	Kathy O’Neil	16–13	12–10	T-6th	
2005–06	Kathy O’Neil	11–18	9–13	10th	
2006–07	Kathy O’Neil	10–17	5–17	T-12th	
2007–08	Kathy O’Neil	13–14	8–14	13th	
2008–09	Kathy O’Neil	8–19	5–17	13th	
2009–10	Kathy O’Neil	16–11	12–10	T-6th	
2010–11	Kathy O’Neil	9–18	8–14	T-11th	
Kathy O’Neil:		411–329			
Sarah Behn (Northeast-10 Conference) (2011–2013)
2011–12	Sarah Behn	11–16	9–13	T-9th	
2012–13	Sarah Behn	18–9	15–7	4th	
Sarah Behn:		34–48			
Sarah Behn (America East Conference) (2013–2014)
2013–14	Sarah Behn	5–23	4–12	T-6th	
Jenerrie Harris (America East Conference) (2014–2018)
2014–15	Jenerrie Harris	14–15	7–9	6th	
2015–16	Jenerrie Harris	4–24	1–15	9th	
2016–17	Jenerrie Harris	3–26	0–16	9th	
2017–18	Jenerrie Harris	4–26	1–15	9th	
Jenerrie Harris:		25–91	9–55		
Tom Garrick (America East Conference) (2018–2021)
2018–19	Tom Garrick	7–22	3–13	8th	
2019–20	Tom Garrick	16–15	11–5	3rd	
2020–21	Tom Garrick	12–9	10–6	3rd	
Tom Garrick:		35–46	24–24		
Denise King (America East Conference) (2021–2025)
2021–22	Denise King	11–16	8–9	6th	
2022–23	Denise King	5–22	4–12	7th	
2023–24	Denise King	4–25	4–12	T-7th	
2024–25	Denise King	3–25	1–15	9th	
Denise King:		23–88	17–48		
Jon Plefka (America East Conference) (2025–2026)
2025–26	Jon Plefka	8–21	2–14	9th	
Jon Plefka:		8–21	2–14		
Total:					
National champion Postseason invitational champion Conference regular season champion Conference regular season and conference tournament champion Division regular season champion Division regular season and conference tournament champion Conference tournament champion

== Postseason ==
The River Hawks made the NCAA Division II women's basketball tournament eight times. They had a combined record of 3–8.

=== NCAA Division II Tournament results ===
Year	Round	Opponent	Result
1991	Regional Semifinals	Saint Anselm	L 65–82
1993	Regional Semifinals; Regional Finals	Stonehill; Bentley	W 84–78; L 60–68
1994	First Round; Regional Semifinals	Franklin Pierce; Bentley	W 83–70; L 63–76
1995	First Round	American International	L 66–78
1997	First Round; Regional Semifinals	Saint Anselm; Bentley	W 65–64; L 57–72
1998	First Round	Franklin Pierce	L 48–57
2000	First Round	American International	L 57–65
2003	First Round	Southern Connecticut	L 63–66
