= 2014–15 Vermont Catamounts women's basketball team =

Intercollegiate basketball season

2014–15 Vermont Catamounts women's basketball
- Conference: America East Conference
- Record: 5–24 (2–14 America East)
- Head coach: Lori Gear McBride (5th season)
- Assistant coaches: Shannon Bush (5th season); Shannon Gholar (2nd season); Courtnay Pilypaitis (3rd season)
- Home arena: Patrick Gym

2014–15 America East Conference women's basketball standings
	Conf.				Overall
Team	W		L	PCT	W		L	PCT
Albany †	14	–	2	.875	24	–	9	.727
Maine	14	–	2	.875	23	–	9	.719
Stony Brook	10	–	6	.625	17	–	14	.548
New Hampshire	9	–	7	.563	17	–	12	.586
Hartford	8	–	8	.500	16	–	17	.485
UMass Lowell*	7	–	9	.438	14	–	15	.483
UMBC	6	–	10	.375	12	–	19	.387
Vermont	2	–	14	.125	5	–	24	.172
Binghamton	2	–	14	.125	4	–	26	.133
† 2015 America East tournament winner As of March 20, 2015 *ineligible for postseason play due to Div. I transitions Rankings from AP poll

The 2014–15 Vermont Catamounts women's basketball team represented the University of Vermont in the America East Conference. The Catamounts were led by fifth year head coach Lori Gear McBride and played their home games in the Patrick Gym. They finished the season 5-24, 2-14 in America East play in a tie for an eighth-place finish. They lost in the quarterfinals of the 2015 America East women's basketball tournament to Albany.

== Media ==
All non-televised home games and conference road games will stream on either ESPN3 or AmericaEast.tv. Select home games will be televised by the Northeast Sports Network. Most road games will stream on the opponents website. All games will be broadcast on WVMT 620 AM and streamed online through SportsJuice.com with Rob Ryan calling the action.

== Roster ==
2014–15 Vermont Catamounts women's basketball team
Players
Coaches

Pos.	#	Name	Height	Year	Previous school	Hometown
G	1	Kylie Butler	5 ft 8 in (1.73 m)	So	Desert Vista	Phoenix, Ariz.
G	3	Sydney Smith	5 ft 11 in (1.8 m)	Fr	Vernon Hills	Vernon Hills, Ill.
G	10	Kylie Atwood	5 ft 5 in (1.65 m)	Jr	Lake Region Union	Irasburg, Vt.
G	12	Katie Lavelle	5 ft 9 in (1.75 m)	Fr	Long Island Lutheran	Hicksville, N.Y.
G	13	Kristina White	5 ft 8 in (1.73 m)	So	Woodbury	Woodbury, Minn.
F	14	Niki Taylor	6 ft 0 in (1.83 m)	Sr	York	York, Maine
F	15	Annie Wheeler	6 ft 2 in (1.88 m)	Sr	North Gwinnett	Suwanee, Ga.
F	21	Kayla Burchill	6 ft 1 in (1.85 m)	Sr	Deering	Portland, Maine
G	22	Tierra Shumpert	5 ft 10 in (1.78 m)	Sr	Highlands Ranch	Lone Tree, Colo.
F	23	Gracia Hutson	6 ft 2 in (1.88 m)	Jr	Hopkins	Wayzata, Minn.
F	25	Kaylea Britton	6 ft 0 in (1.83 m)	Jr	Ulysses	Ulysses, Kan.
F	32	Rachel Merrill	6 ft 3 in (1.91 m)	Fr	Owego Free Academy	Owego, N.Y.
G	40	Jordan Eisler	5 ft 7 in (1.7 m)	So	Monarch	Louisville, Colo.

Head coach

- Lori Gear McBride

Assistant coach(es)

- Shannon Bush
- Shannon Gholar
- Courtnay Pilypaitis

Legend

- (C) Team captain
- (S) Suspended
- (I) Ineligible
- (W) Walk-on
- Injured
- Current redshirt

Roster
Last update: 2014-09-14

== Schedule ==
Date time, TV	Rank^{#}	Opponent^{#}	Result	Record	Site (attendance) city, state
Regular season
11/15/2014*; 2:00 pm		Brown	L 76–81	0–1	Patrick Gym (572); Burlington, VT
11/18/2014*; 7:00 pm		Bryant	L 55–72	0–2	Patrick Gym (501); Burlington, VT
11/22/2014*; 2:00 pm		at Boston University	L 61–66	0–3	Case Gym (213); Boston, MA
11/25/2014*; 7:00 pm		at Central Connecticut	L 75–77 ^{OT}	0–4	William H. Detrick Gymnasium (512); New Britain, Connecticut
11/29/2014*; 1:00 pm		Delaware	L 46–68	0–5	Patrick Gym (546); Burlington, VT
12/01/2014*; 7:00 pm		at No. 21 Syracuse	L 63–94	0–6	Carrier Dome (357); Syracuse, NY
12/03/2014*; 7:00 pm		at Sacred Heart	L 66–76	0–7	William H. Pitt Center (206); Fairfield, CT
12/07/2014*; 2:00 pm		Dartmouth	W 68–63	1–7	Patrick Gym (479); Burlington, VT
12/14/2014*; 3:30 pm		Wanger	W 82–75	2–7	Patrick Gym (424); Burlington, VT
12/17/2014*; 2:00 pm		at St. Francis Brooklyn	W 63–61	3–7	Generoso Pope Athletic Complex (150); Brooklyn, NY
12/20/2014*; 8:00 pm, ESPN3		at Green Bay	L 40–60	3–8	Kress Events Center (2,218); Green Bay, WI
12/30/2014*; 8:00 pm		Cornell	L 87–90 ^{2OT}	3–9	Patrick Gym (661); Burlington, VT
01/03/2015; 2:00 pm		Hartford	L 46–62	3–10 (0–1)	Patrick Gym (662); Burlington, VT
01/07/2015; 11:00 am		at Stony Brook	L 38–60	3–11 (0–2)	Island Federal Credit Union Arena (1,012); Stony Brook, NY
01/10/2015; 12:00 pm		at Binghamton	L 62–73	3–12 (0–3)	Binghamton University Events Center (N/A); Vestal, NY
01/14/2015; 11:30 am		New Hampshire	L 56–64	3–13 (0–4)	Patrick Gym (1,294); Burlington, VT
01/17/2015; 2:00 pm		UMBC	L 61–68	3–14 (0–5)	Patrick Gym (845); Burlington, VT
01/22/2015; 5:30 pm		at Maine	L 46–74	3–15 (0–6)	Cross Insurance Center (N/A); Bangor, ME
01/25/2015; 4:30 pm, ESPN3		at UMass Lowell	L 63–72	3–16 (0–7)	Tsongas Center (3,971); Lowell, MA
01/29/2015; 7:00 pm		Albany	L 48–89	3–17 (0–8)	Patrick Gym (348); Burlington, VT
02/01/2015; 2:00 pm		at Hartford	L 49–60	3–18 (0–9)	Chase Arena at Reich Family Pavilion (1,307); Hartford, CT
02/04/2015; 7:00 pm		Stony Brook	L 62–74	3–19 (0–10)	Patrick Gym (410); Burlington, VT
02/07/2015; 2:00 pm		Binghamton	W 72–66	4–19 (1–10)	Patrick Gym (564); Burlington, VT
02/11/2015; 7:00 pm		at New Hampshire	W 63–60	5–19 (2–10)	Lundholm Gym (408); Durham, NH
02/14/2015; 1:00 pm		at UMBC	L 64–71	5–20 (2–11)	Retriever Activities Center (388); Catonsville, MD
02/18/2015; 7:00 pm		Maine	L 54–57	5–21 (2–12)	Patrick Gym (525); Burlington, VT
02/26/2015; 7:00 pm		UMass Lowell	L 64–72	5–22 (2–13)	Patrick Gym (570); Burlington, VT
03/01/2015; 2:00 pm		at Albany	L 48–76	5–23 (2–14)	SEFCU Arena (824); Albany, NY
2015 America East tournament
03/07/2015; 6:00 pm, ESPN3		vs. Albany; Quarterfinals	L 33–63	5–24	Binghamton University Events Center (N/A); Vestal, NY
*Non-conference game. ^{#}Rankings from AP Poll. (#) Tournament seedings in parentheses. All times are in Eastern Time.

== See also ==
- 2014–15 Vermont Catamounts men's basketball team
- Vermont Catamounts women's basketball
