= 2014–15 Hartford Hawks women's basketball team =

Intercollegiate basketball season

2014–15 Hartford Hawks women's basketball
- Conference: America East Conference
- Record: 16–17 (8–8 America East)
- Head coach: Jennifer Rizzotti (16th season)
- Assistant coaches: Brian Nik (16th season); Bill Sullivan (15th season); Jackie Smith (2nd season)
- Home arena: Chase Arena at Reich Family Pavilion

2014–15 America East Conference women's basketball standings
	Conf.				Overall
Team	W		L	PCT	W		L	PCT
Albany †	14	–	2	.875	24	–	9	.727
Maine	14	–	2	.875	23	–	9	.719
Stony Brook	10	–	6	.625	17	–	14	.548
New Hampshire	9	–	7	.563	17	–	12	.586
Hartford	8	–	8	.500	16	–	17	.485
UMass Lowell*	7	–	9	.438	14	–	15	.483
UMBC	6	–	10	.375	12	–	19	.387
Vermont	2	–	14	.125	5	–	24	.172
Binghamton	2	–	14	.125	4	–	26	.133
† 2015 America East tournament winner As of March 20, 2015 *ineligible for postseason play due to Div. I transitions Rankings from AP poll

The 2014–15 Hartford Hawks women's basketball team represented the University of Hartford in the America East Conference. The Hawks were led by sixteenth year Women's Basketball Hall of Fame head coach Jennifer Rizzotti and played their home games in the Chase Arena at Reich Family Pavilion. They finished the season 16-17, 8-8 in America East play for a fifth-place finish. They advance to the championship game of the 2015 America East women's basketball tournament, where they lost to Albany.

== Media ==
All home games and conference road games will stream on either ESPN3 or AmericaEast.tv. Most road games will stream on the opponents website. All games will be broadcast on the radio on WWUH.

== Roster ==
2014–15 Hartford Hawks women's basketball team
Players
Coaches

Pos.	#	Name	Height	Year	Previous school	Hometown
G	3	Deanna Mayza	5 ft 7 in (1.7 m)	So	The Hill School	Pennsburg, PA
F	4	Christie Michals	6 ft 1 in (1.85 m)	Jr	Robinson Secondary	Fairfax, VA
G	10	Mary Pattison	5 ft 9 in (1.75 m)	Fr	Troy	Troy, NY
G	11	Katelyn Skinner	5 ft 10 in (1.78 m)	Jr	Homer Center	Homer City, PA
F	12	La'Trice Hall	5 ft 11 in (1.8 m)	So	Buffalo Academy of the Sacred Heart	Buffalo, NY
G/F	15	Darby Lee	6 ft 0 in (1.83 m)	Fr	Altoona Area	Altoona, PA
G	21	Shanise Bultron	5 ft 8 in (1.73 m)	Sr	Tabor Academy	Watertown, MA
F	22	Katie Roth	6 ft 2 in (1.88 m)	RS So	Maple Hill	Castleton, NY
G	23	Morgan Lumb	5 ft 8 in (1.73 m)	So	North Andover	North Andover, MA
F	24	Alyssa Reaves	6 ft 0 in (1.83 m)	So	Northwest Catholic	Bloomfield, CT
G	25	Amber Bepko	5 ft 9 in (1.75 m)	Sr	Mercy	Guilford, CT
G	30	Mallory Shickora	5 ft 8 in (1.73 m)	Jr	Mount Saint Dominic Acad.	Little Falls, NJ
F	31	Cherelle Moore	6 ft 0 in (1.83 m)	Sr	Kolbe Cathedral	Bridgeport, CT
F	32	Cassidy Bundy	6 ft 2 in (1.88 m)	Fr	Montville	Montville, CT
F	33	Janelle Harrison	6 ft 0 in (1.83 m)	Fr	Cromwell	Cromwell, CT

Head coach

Jennifer Rizzotti

Assistant coach(es)

Brian Mik
Bill Sullivan
Jackie Smith

Legend

- (C) Team captain
- (S) Suspended
- (I) Ineligible
- (W) Walk-on
- Injured
- Current redshirt

Roster
Last update: 2014-07-17

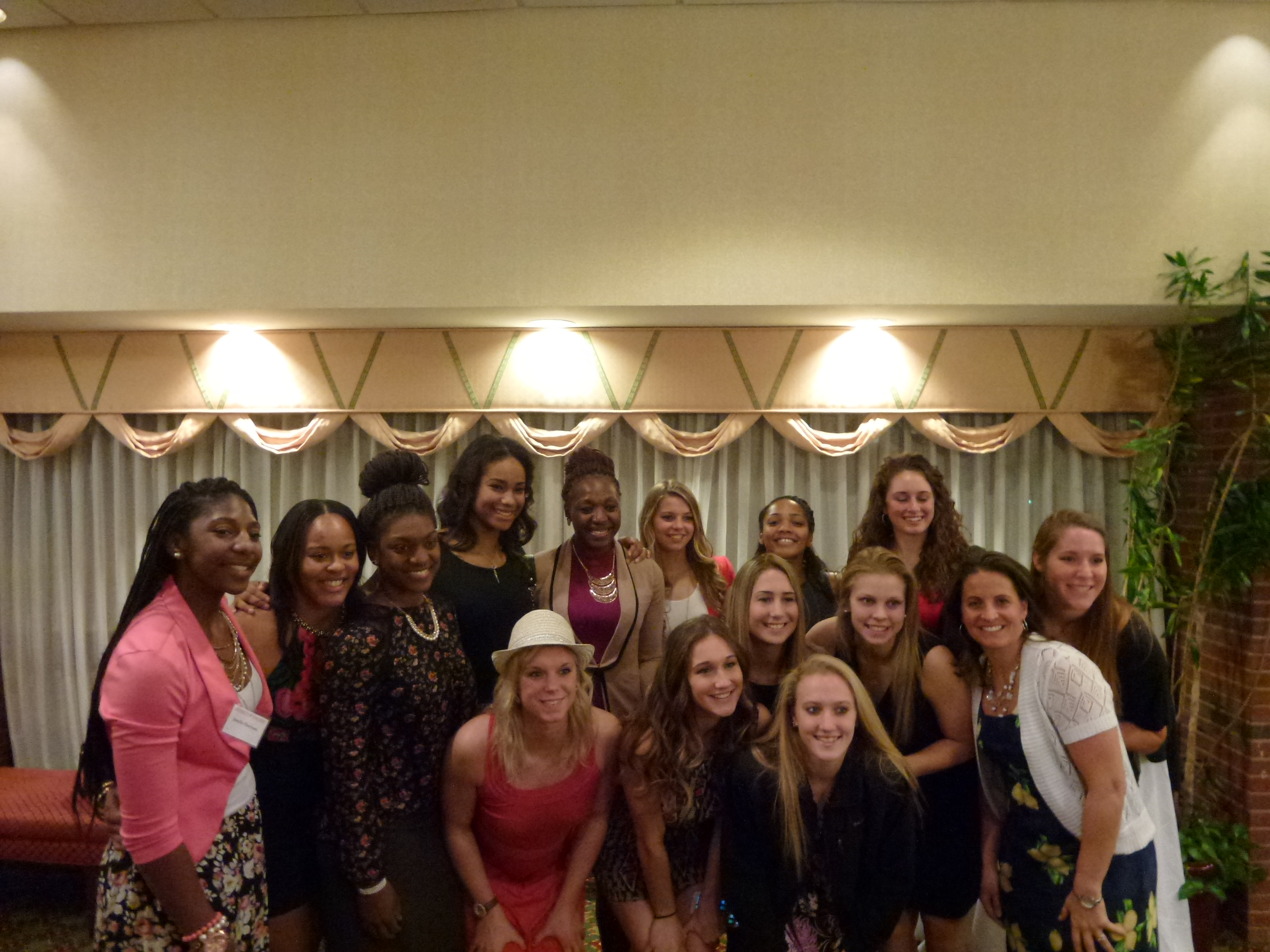
Hartford Hawks team picture

== Schedule ==
Date time, TV	Rank^{#}	Opponent^{#}	Result	Record	Site (attendance) city, state
Non-conference regular season
11/14/2014*; 7:00 pm		at Cornell	W 48–46	1–0	Newman Arena (413); Ithaca, NY
11/17/2014*; 7:00 pm		at Central Connecticut; Rivalry	W 75–63	2–0	William H. Detrick Gymnasium (878); New Britain, CT
11/20/2014*; 7:00 pm		Providence	W 57–54	3–0	Chase Arena at Reich Family Pavilion (1,803); Hartford, CT
11/23/2014*; 2:00 pm		at Lafayette	L 59–74	3–1	Kirby Sports Center (577); Easton, PA
11/27/2014*; 1:00 pm		vs. Furman; Cancún Challenge Riviera Division	L 70–81	3–2	Moon Palace Golf & Spa Resort (650); Cancún, MX
11/28/2014*; 3:30 pm		vs. Washington; Cancún Challenge Riviera Division	L 43–53	3–3	Moon Palace Golf & Spa Resort (650); Cancún, MX
11/29/2014*; 3:30 pm		vs. Florida State; Cancún Challenge Riviera Division	L 59–69	3–4	Moon Palace Golf & Spa Resort (650); Cancún, MX
12/04/2014*; 12:00 pm		at Dartmouth	L 43–49	3–5	Leede Arena (1,083); Hanover, NH
12/07/2014*; 2:00 pm		Boston College	L 61–73	3–6	Chase Arena at Reich Family Pavilion (1,585); Hartford, CT
12/10/2014*; 7:00 pm		Penn State	W 62–57	4–6	Chase Arena at Reich Family Pavilion (1,467); Hartford, CT
12/14/2014*; 2:00 pm		Sacred Heart	W 68–63	5–6	Chase Arena at Reich Family Pavilion (1,274); Hartford, CT
12/21/2014*; 12:00 pm		Quinnipiac	L 58–70	5–7	Chase Arena at Reich Family Pavilion (2,310); Hartford, CT
12/29/2014*; 3:00 pm		vs. Princeton; Fordham Holiday Classic semifinals	L 51–64	5–8	Rose Hill Gymnasium (647); Bronx, NY
12/30/2014*; 1:00 pm		vs. Savannah State; Fordham Holiday Classic 3rd place game	W 59–55	6–8	Rose Hill Gymnasium (N/A); Bronx, NY
01/03/2015; 2:00 pm		at Vermont	W 62–46	7–8 (1–0)	Patrick Gym (662); Burlington, VT
01/06/2015; 7:00 pm		Binghamton	W 59–44	8–8 (2–0)	Chase Arena at Reich Family Pavilion (1,004); Hartford, CT
01/10/2015; 2:00 pm		Maine	L 57–68	8–9 (2–1)	Chase Arena at Reich Family Pavilion (1,432); Hartford, CT
01/17/2015; 2:00 pm		at UMass Lowell	W 67–58	9–9 (3–1)	Costello Athletic Center (303); Lowell, MA
01/19/2015; 2:00 pm		UMBC	W 70–63	10–9 (4–1)	Chase Arena at Reich Family Pavilion (1,854); Hartford, CT
01/21/2015; 7:00 pm		New Hampshire	L 63–65	10–10 (4–2)	Chase Arena at Reich Family Pavilion (981); Hartford, CT
01/25/2015; 7:00 pm		at Albany	L 58–82	10–11 (4–3)	SEFCU Arena (2,185); Albany, NY
01/29/2015; 7:00 pm, ESPN3		at Stony Brook	W 60–58	11–11 (5–3)	Island Federal Credit Union Arena (501); Stony Brook, NY
02/01/2015; 2:00 pm		Vermont	W 60–49	12–11 (6–3)	Chase Arena at Reich Family Pavilion (1,307); Hartford, CT
02/04/2015; 7:00 pm		at Binghamton	W 51–46	13–11 (7–3)	Binghamton University Events Center (1,099); Vestal, NY
02/08/2015; 2:00 pm		at Maine	L 45–63	13–12 (7–4)	Cross Insurance Center (3,287); Bangor, ME
02/14/2015; 2:00 pm		UMass Lowell	L 62–65	13–13 (7–5)	Chase Arena at Reich Family Pavilion (1,429); Hartford, CT
02/18/2015; 7:00 pm		at New Hampshire	L 50–55	13–14 (7–6)	Lundholm Gym (N/A); Durham, NH
02/22/2015; 1:00 pm		at UMBC	L 51–53	13–15 (7–7)	Retriever Activities Center (339); Catonsville, MD
02/26/2015; 7:00 pm		Albany	L 50–65	13–16 (7–8)	Chase Arena at Reich Family Pavilion (1,492); Hartford, CT
03/01/2015; 2:00 pm		Stony Brook	W 56–49	14–16 (8–8)	Chase Arena at Reich Family Pavilion (1,815); Hartford, CT
America East Women's Tournament
03/07/2015; 2:15 pm, ESPN3	(5)	vs. (4) New Hampshire; Quarterfinals	W 58–42	15–16	Binghamton University Events Center (N/A); Vestal, NY
03/08/2015; 2:00 pm, ESPN3	(5)	vs. (1) Maine; Semifinals	W 65–54	16–16	Binghamton University Events Center (N/A); Vestal, NY
03/13/2015; 4:30 pm, ESPNU	(5)	at (2) Albany; Championship Game	L 75–84	16–17	SEFCU Arena (1,574); Albany, NY
*Non-conference game. ^{#}Rankings from AP Poll. (#) Tournament seedings in parentheses. All times are in Eastern Time.

== See also ==
- 2014–15 Hartford Hawks men's basketball team
- Hartford Hawks women's basketball
