= 2014–15 UMBC Retrievers women's basketball team =

Intercollegiate basketball season

2014–15 UMBC Retrievers women's basketball
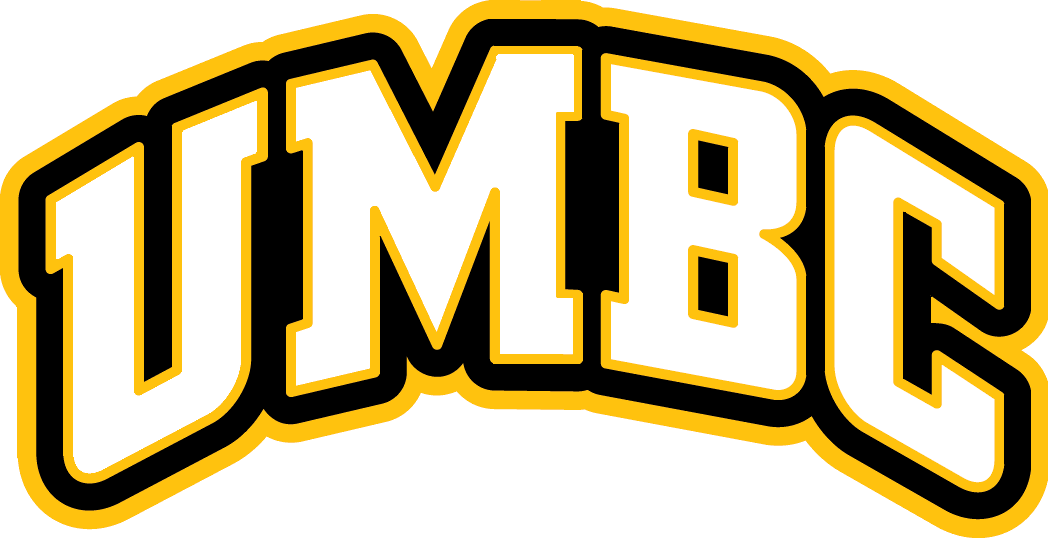
- Conference: America East Conference
- Record: 12–19 (6–10 America East)
- Head coach: Phil Stern (13th season)
- Assistant coaches: Rich Conover (2nd season); Carlee Cassidy (3rd season); Taryn Christian
- Home arena: Retriever Activities Center

2014–15 America East Conference women's basketball standings
	Conf.				Overall
Team	W		L	PCT	W		L	PCT
Albany †	14	–	2	.875	24	–	9	.727
Maine	14	–	2	.875	23	–	9	.719
Stony Brook	10	–	6	.625	17	–	14	.548
New Hampshire	9	–	7	.563	17	–	12	.586
Hartford	8	–	8	.500	16	–	17	.485
UMass Lowell*	7	–	9	.438	14	–	15	.483
UMBC	6	–	10	.375	12	–	19	.387
Vermont	2	–	14	.125	5	–	24	.172
Binghamton	2	–	14	.125	4	–	26	.133
† 2015 America East tournament winner As of March 20, 2015 *ineligible for postseason play due to Div. I transitions Rankings from AP poll

The 2014–15 UMBC Retrievers women's basketball team represented the University of Maryland, Baltimore County in the America East Conference. The Retrievers were led by thirteenth-year head coach Phil Stern and played their home games in the Retriever Activities Center. They finished the season 12–19, 6–10 in America East play for a seventh-place finish. They advanced to the semifinals of the 2015 America East women's basketball tournament, where they lost to Albany.

== Media ==
All non-televised home games and conference road games were streamed on either ESPN3 or AmericaEast.tv. Most road games were streamed on the opponent's website. Select games were broadcast on the radio on WQLL-1370 AM.

== Roster ==
2014–15 UMBC Retrievers women's basketball team
Players
Coaches

Pos.	#	Name	Height	Year	Previous school	Hometown
G	0	Aaliyah Wilson	5 ft 6 in (1.68 m)	So	Seton Keough	Baltimore, MD
G	2	Marissa Sommerville	5 ft 6 in (1.68 m)	So	St. Mary's Ryken	Loveville, MD
G/F	3	Liz McNaughton	6 ft 0 in (1.83 m)	Jr	Fairfax	Fairfax, VA
G	4	Taylor McCarley	5 ft 10 in (1.78 m)	So	Academy of the Holy Cross	Bowie, MD
G	12	Capree Garner	5 ft 7 in (1.7 m)	Jr	Springbrook	Silver Spring, MD
F	13	Pandora Wilson	6 ft 1 in (1.85 m)	RS So	Academy of the Holy Cross	Gaithersburg, MD
G	14	Janelle Saling	5 ft 8 in (1.73 m)	Sr	Lathrop	Lathrop, MO
F/C	15	Amanda Hagaman	6 ft 2 in (1.88 m)	So	Manasquan	Manasquan, NJ
C	20	Infiniti Alston	6 ft 6 in (1.98 m)	So	Digital Harbor	Baltimore, MD
G	21	Carly Harris	5 ft 6 in (1.68 m)	Fr	Shaler Area	Glenshaw, PA
G/F	22	Maddie Torresin	6 ft 0 in (1.83 m)	Fr	Cumberland Valley	Mechanicsburg, PA
G	23	Emily Russo	5 ft 6 in (1.68 m)	So	Glenelg	Woodbine, MD
G	25	Laura Castaldo	5 ft 8 in (1.73 m)	Fr	Clarkstown South	West Nyack, NY
C	32	Dana Lewis	6 ft 2 in (1.88 m)	RS Sr	Brodhead	Brodhead, WI
G	35	Zaenna Echevarria	5 ft 6 in (1.68 m)	Fr	York Catholic	York, PA

Head coach

- Phil Stern (Concordia (NY))

Assistant coach(es)

- Kerry Cashman (Boston University)
- Carlee Cassidy (UMBC)
- Taryn Christian (Northeastern)

Legend

- (C) Team captain
- (S) Suspended
- (I) Ineligible
- (W) Walk-on
- Injured
- Current redshirt

Roster

== Schedule ==
Date time, TV	Rank^{#}	Opponent^{#}	Result	Record	Site (attendance) city, state
Regular season
11/14/2014*; 12:00 pm		Eastern (PA)	W 93–68	1–0	Retriever Activities Center (N/A); Catonsville, MD
11/16/2014*; 5:00 pm		Loyola (MD)	W 81–58	2–0	Retriever Activities Center (N/A); Catonsville, MD
11/19/2014*; 7:00 pm		Coppin State	W 78–65	3–0	Retriever Activities Center (505); Catonsville, MD
11/23/2014*; 1:00 pm		Robert Morris	L 60–84	3–1	Retriever Activities Center (N/A); Catonsville, MD
11/25/2014*; 5:00 pm		Towson	L 54–59	3–2	Retriever Activities Center (345); Catonsville, MD
12/03/2014*; 7:00 pm		at American	L 51–77	3–3	Bender Arena (198); Washington, D.C.
12/05/2014*; 12:00 pm		at Columbia	W 76–66	4–3	Levien Gymnasium (2,092); New York City, NY
12/09/2014*; 7:00 pm		at Bucknell	L 41–85	4–4	Sojka Pavilion (426); Lewisburg, PA
12/18/2014*; 5:00 pm		at Rider	L 55–67	4–5	Alumni Gym (310); Lawrenceville, NJ
12/22/2014*; 2:00 pm		at Maryland Eastern Shore	W 87–78	5–5	Hytche Athletic Center (195); Princess Anne, MD
12/29/2014*; 7:00 pm		at Penn	L 65–69	5–6	Palestra (602); Philadelphia, PA
12/30/2014*; 2:00 pm		at La Salle	L 62–65	5–7	Tom Gola Arena (190); Philadelphia, PA
01/01/2015*; 7:00 pm		Morgan State	L 46–54	5–8	Retriever Activities Center (344); Catonsville, MD
01/08/2015; 11:30 am		at UMass Lowell	L 62–75	5–9 (0–1)	Costello Athletic Center (924); Lowell, MA
01/10/2015; 1:00 pm		at New Hampshire	L 45–67	5–10 (0–2)	Lundholm Gym (372); Durham, NH
01/14/2015; 7:00 pm		Stony Brook	L 50–66	5–11 (0–3)	Retriever Activities Center (318); Catonsville, MD
01/17/2015; 2:00 pm		at Vermont	W 68–61	6–11 (1–3)	Patrick Gym (845); Burlington, VT
01/19/2015; 2:00 pm		at Hartford	L 63–70	6–12 (1–4)	Chase Arena at Reich Family Pavilion (1,854); Hartford, CT
01/22/2015; 12:00 pm		Albany	L 62–72	6–13 (1–5)	Retriever Activities Center (395); Catonsville, MD
01/25/2015; 1:00 pm		Maine	L 42–56	6–14 (1–6)	Retriever Activities Center (503); Catonsville, MD
01/28/2015; 7:00 pm		at Binghamton	W 71–55	7–14 (2–6)	Binghamton University Events Center (1,349); Vestal, NY
02/04/2015; 7:00 pm		UMass Lowell	L 78–84	7–15 (2–7)	Retriever Activities Center (397); Catonsville, MD
02/07/2015; 1:00 pm		New Hampshire	W 69–55	8–15 (3–7)	Retriever Activities Center (412); Catonsville, MD
02/11/2015; 7:00 pm		at Stony Brook	L 41–74	8–16 (3–8)	Island Federal Credit Union Arena (472); Stony Brook, NY
02/14/2015; 1:00 pm		Vermont	W 71–64	9–16 (4–8)	Retriever Activities Center (388); Catonsville, MD
02/18/2015; 7:00 pm, ESPN3		at Albany	L 68–84	9–17 (4–9)	SEFCU Arena (548); Albany, NY
02/22/2015; 1:00 pm		Hartford	W 53–51	10–17 (5–9)	Retriever Activities Center (339); Catonsville, MD
02/26/2015; 7:00 pm		at Maine	L 41–61	10–18 (5–10)	Cross Insurance Center (3,004); Bangor, ME
03/01/2015; 1:00 pm		Binghamton	W 73–50	11–18 (6–10)	Retriever Activities Center (376); Catonsville, MD
2015 America East tournament
03/07/2015; 8:15 pm, ESPN3		vs. Stony Brook; Quarterfinals	W 49–47	12–18	Binghamton University Events Center (520); Vestal, NY
03/08/2015; 4:30 pm, ESPN3		vs. Albany; Semifinals	L 37–66	12–19	Binghamton University Events Center (472); Vestal, NY
*Non-conference game. ^{#}Rankings from AP Poll. (#) Tournament seedings in parentheses. All times are in Eastern Time.

== See also ==
- 2014–15 UMBC Retrievers men's basketball team
- UMBC Retrievers women's basketball
