= 2015 America East women's basketball tournament =

- Classification: Division I
- Season: 2014–15
- Teams: 8
- Quarterfinals site: Binghamton University Events Center; Binghamton, NY
- Semifinals site: Binghamton University Events Center; Binghamton, NY
- Finals site: SEFCU Arena; Albany, NY
- Champions: Albany (4th title)
- Winning coach: Katie Abrahamson-Henderson (4th title)
- MVP: Shereesha Richards (Albany)
- Television: ESPNU/ESPN3
- America East women's basketball tournaments

2014–15 America East Conference women's basketball standings
	Conf.				Overall
Team	W		L	PCT	W		L	PCT
Albany †	14	–	2	.875	24	–	9	.727
Maine	14	–	2	.875	23	–	9	.719
Stony Brook	10	–	6	.625	17	–	14	.548
New Hampshire	9	–	7	.563	17	–	12	.586
Hartford	8	–	8	.500	16	–	17	.485
UMass Lowell*	7	–	9	.438	14	–	15	.483
UMBC	6	–	10	.375	12	–	19	.387
Vermont	2	–	14	.125	5	–	24	.172
Binghamton	2	–	14	.125	4	–	26	.133
† 2015 America East tournament winner As of March 20, 2015 *ineligible for postseason play due to Div. I transitions Rankings from AP poll

The 2015 America East women's basketball tournament began on March 7 and concluded with the championship game on March 13 at the higher remaining seed. The winner earned an automatic bid to the 2015 NCAA tournament.

== Bracket and Results ==
Quarterfinals; Saturday, March 7, 2015; ESPN3
1	Maine	78
8	Binghamton	71
4	New Hampshire	42
5	Hartford	58
2	Albany	63
7	Vermont	33
3	Stony Brook	47
6	UMBC	49

Semifinals; Sunday, March 8, 2015; ESPN3
1	Maine	54
5	Hartford	65
2	Albany	66
6	UMBC	37

Championship Game; Friday, March 13, 2015; ESPNU
5	Hartford	75
2	Albany	84

All times listed are Eastern

== See also ==
- America East Conference
- 2015 America East men's basketball tournament
