= 2014–15 Duke Blue Devils women's basketball team =

Intercollegiate basketball season

2014–15 Duke Blue Devils women's basketball

NCAA Women's Tournament, Sweet Sixteen
- Conference: Atlantic Coast Conference

Ranking
- Coaches: No. 16
- AP: No. 16
- Record: 23–11 (11–5 ACC)
- Head coach: Joanne P. McCallie
- Assistant coaches: Al Brown; Rene Haynes; Hernando Planells
- Home arena: Cameron Indoor Stadium

2014–15 ACC women's basketball standings
	Conf.				Overall
Team	W		L	PCT	W		L	PCT
No. 2 Notre Dame^{†}	15	–	1	.938	36	–	3	.923
No. 7 Florida State	14	–	2	.875	32	–	5	.865
No. 8 Louisville	12	–	4	.750	27	–	7	.794
No. 16 Duke	11	–	5	.688	23	–	11	.676
Syracuse	11	–	5	.688	22	–	10	.688
No. 15 North Carolina	10	–	6	.625	26	–	9	.743
Pittsburgh	9	–	7	.563	20	–	12	.625
Miami (FL)	8	–	8	.500	20	–	13	.606
Virginia	7	–	9	.438	17	–	14	.548
NC State	7	–	9	.438	18	–	15	.545
Georgia Tech	7	–	9	.438	19	–	15	.559
Boston College	5	–	11	.313	13	–	17	.433
Wake Forest	2	–	14	.125	13	–	20	.394
Virginia Tech	1	–	15	.063	12	–	20	.375
Clemson	1	–	15	.063	9	–	21	.300
† 2015 ACC tournament winner As of 7 April 2015; Rankings from AP poll

The 2014–15 Duke Blue Devils women's basketball team represented Duke University during the 2014–15 NCAA Division I women's basketball season. Returning as head coach was Joanne P. McCallie, entering her 8th season. The team played its home games at Cameron Indoor Stadium in Durham, North Carolina as members of the Atlantic Coast Conference. They finished the season 23–11, 11–5 in ACC play to finish in a tie for fourth place. They advanced to the semifinals of the ACC women's tournament, where they lost to Notre Dame. They received an at-large bid to the NCAA women's tournament, where they defeated Albany in the first round, and Mississippi State in the second round, before losing to Maryland in the sweet sixteen.

== Off season ==
=== Departures ===
- 2- Alexis Jones, a sophomore with the 2013-14 team who transferred after suffering a knee injury
- 3- Kianna Holland, a freshman with the 2013-14 team who transferred
- 4- Chloe Wells, a senior with the 2013-14 team who graduated
- 5- Katie Heckman, a redshirt freshman with the 2013-14 team who received a medical hardship after suffering a torn ACL and two arthroscopic knee surgeries
- 12- Chelsea Gray, a senior with the 2013-14 team who graduated
- 15- Richa Jackson, a senior with the 2013-14 team who graduated
- 32- Tricia Liston, a senior with the 2013-14 team who graduated. She was selected in the 2014 WNBA draft with the 12th pick by the Minnesota Lynx.
- 33- Haley Peters, a senior with the 2013-14 team who graduated. She signed a WNBA contract with the Washington Mystics but was later waived.

=== Incoming signees ===
- 4- Sierra Calhoun, rated the #7 point guard in her class, led Sierra Calhoun of Christ the King to one state championship and three straight playoff appearances.
- 11- Azurá Stevens, former High School McDonald's All-American who averaged 30 points and 20 rebounds per game her senior season
- 32- Erin Mathias, WPIL 4A Player of the Year in 2012-13 and a two-time member of the 4A All-State Team in Pittsburgh
- 34- Lyneé Belton, former Full Court Fab 50 All-Star in 2013 with the Bullis School

== 2013–14 media ==
All Blue Devils games aired on the Blue Devil IMG Sports Network. WDNC was the main station for the Blue Devils IMG Sports Network games, with Steve Barnes providing the play-by-play and Morgan Patrick acting as analyst.

== Roster ==
2014–15 Duke Blue Devils women's basketball team
Players
Coaches

Pos.	#	Name	Height	Year	Previous school	Hometown
F/C	1	Elizabeth Williams	6 ft 3 in (1.91 m)	Sr	Princess Anne	Virginia Beach, VA
G/F	4	Sierra Calhoun	6 ft 0 in (1.83 m)	Fr	Christ the King	Brooklyn, NY
G/F	11	Azurá Stevens	6 ft 5 in (1.96 m)	Fr	Cary	Raleigh, NC
G	12	Mercedes Riggs	5 ft 7 in (1.7 m)	Jr	Timpanagos	Lindon, UT
G/F	14	Ka'lia Johnson	5 ft 10 in (1.78 m)	Sr	Thomas Dale	Chester, VA
F/C	21	Kendall McCravey-Cooper	6 ft 4 in (1.93 m)	So	St. Anthony	Carson, CA
F	22	Oderah Chidom	6 ft 4 in (1.93 m)	So	Bishop O'Dowd	Oakland, CA
G	23	Rebecca Greenwell	6 ft 1 in (1.85 m)	RS Fr	Owensboro Catholic	Owensboro, KY
F/C	30	Amber Henson	6 ft 4 in (1.93 m)	RS So	Walter L. Sickles	Tampa, FL
F/C	32	Erin Mathias	6 ft 4 in (1.93 m)	Fr	Fox Chapel Area	Pittsburgh, PA
F/C	34	Lyneé Belton	6 ft 3 in (1.91 m)	Fr	The Bullis School	Clinton, MD
G	35	Jenna Frush	5 ft 6 in (1.68 m)	Sr	Northern	Durham, N.C.

Head coach

- Joanne P. McCallie (Northwestern)

Assistant coach(es)

- Al Brown (Purdue)
- Rene Haynes (Michigan State)
- Hernando Planells (Regis)

Legend

- (C) Team captain
- (S) Suspended
- (I) Ineligible
- (W) Walk-on
- Injured
- Current redshirt

Roster
Last update: 2014-07-02

== Schedule ==
Date time, TV	Rank^{#}	Opponent^{#}	Result	Record	High points	High rebounds	High assists	Site (attendance) city, state
Exhibition
10/30/2014*; 6:30 pm	No. 7	Limestone	W 100–33	–	19 – Chidom	11 – 2 tied	7 – Johnson	Cameron Indoor Stadium (N/A); Durham, NC
11/02/2014*; 2:00 pm	No. 7	Armstrong State	W 100–45	–	31 – Greenwell	18 – Williams	8 – Johnson	Cameron Indoor Stadium (N/A); Durham, NC
Non-conference regular season
11/16/2014*; 8:00 pm, SECN	No. 7	at Alabama	W 90–40	1–0	17 – 3 tied	12 – Williams (1)	5 – Chidom (1)	Foster Auditorium (2,765); Tuscaloosa, AL
11/20/2014*; 7:00 pm	No. 7	at Old Dominion	W 82–66	2–0	22 – Williams (2)	11 – Johnson (1)	13 – Johnson (1)	Constant Center (3,452); Norfolk, VA
11/23/2014*; 2:00 pm	No. 7	Marquette	W 83–51	3–0	22 – Greenwell (2)	12 – Greenwell (1)	6 – Johnson (2)	Cameron Indoor Stadium (4,080); Durham, NC
11/25/2014*; 6:30 pm	No. 8	Buffalo	W 88–54	4–0	21 – Calhoun (1)	13 – Greenwell (2)	4 – Cooper (1)	Cameron Indoor Stadium (3,794); Durham, NC
11/28/2014*; 6:30 pm	No. 8	Stony Brook	W 72–42	5–0	13 – 2 tied	12 – Williams (2)	3 – Greenwell (1)	Cameron Indoor Stadium (4,421); Durham, NC
11/30/2014*; 1:00 pm, SECN	No. 8	at No. 7 Texas A&M	L 59–63	5–1	23 – Greenwell (3)	8 – Henson (1)	3 – Henson (1)	Reed Arena (6,123); College Station, TX
12/03/2014*; 7:30 pm, BTN	No. 9	at No. 12 Nebraska; ACC–Big Ten Women's Challenge	L 54–60	5–2	16 – Stevens (1)	9 – Stevens (1)	3 – 2 tied	Pinnacle Bank Arena (7,571); Lincoln, NE
12/07/2014*; 1:00 pm, ESPN2	No. 9	No. 1 South Carolina	L 50–51	5–3	12 – Greenwell (4)	12 – Stevens (2)	3 – Chidom (2)	Cameron Indoor Stadium (6,004); Durham, NC
12/17/2014*; 6:30 pm, ESPN3	No. 13	Oklahoma	W 92–72	6–3	26 – Williams (3)	20 – Williams (3)	3 – 4 tied	Cameron Indoor Stadium (4,006); Durham, NC
12/19/2014*; 6:30 pm	No. 13	UMass Lowell	W 95–48	7–3	19 – Calhoun (2)	11 – Stevens (3)	6 – Johnson (5)	Cameron Indoor Stadium (3,804); Durham, NC
12/21/2014*; 3:00 pm, ESPN2	No. 13	No. 8 Kentucky	W 89–68	8–3	17 – Stevens (2)	10 – Williams (4)	6 – Johnson (6)	Cameron Indoor Stadium (6,043); Durham, NC
12/29/2014*; 9:00 pm, ESPN2	No. 10	at No. 2 Connecticut	L 52–83	8–4	16 – Stevens (3)	8 – Williams (5)	3 – Johnson (7)	XL Center (13,514); Hartford, CT
01/02/2015*; 6:30 pm	No. 10	North Carolina A&T	W 87–36	9–4	20 – Greenwell (5)	8 – Stevens (4)	7 – Williams (2)	Cameron Indoor Stadium (4,886); Durham, NC
ACC regular season
01/04/2015; 2:00 pm	No. 10	Wake Forest	W 70–63	10–4 (1–0)	18 – Williams (4)	8 – Williams (6)	5 – Johnson (8)	Cameron Indoor Stadium (4,207); Durham, NC
01/08/2015; 6:30 pm, ESPN3	No. 13	No. 21 Syracuse	W 74–72	11–4 (2–0)	20 – Greenwell (6)	6 – 2 tied	5 – 2 tied	Cameron Indoor Stadium (3,899); Durham, NC
01/11/2015; 1:00 pm, RSN	No. 13	at Florida State	L 58–74	11–5 (2–1)	19 – Greenwell (7)	5 – Greenwell (4)	3 – Williams (3)	Donald L. Tucker Center (3,536); Tallahassee, FL
01/15/2015; 6:30 pm	No. 16	Virginia Tech	W 65–40	12–5 (3–1)	21 – Greenwell (8)	13 – Stevens (6)	5 – 2 tied	Cameron Indoor Stadium (4,010); Durham, NC
01/18/2015; 1:00 pm, RSN	No. 16	Miami	W 68–53	13–5 (4–1)	24 – Williams (5)	11 – Williams (7)	4 – Johnson (11)	Cameron Indoor Stadium (4,564); Durham, NC
01/22/2015; 7:00 pm	No. 15	at Boston College	L 56–60	13–6 (4–2)	24 – Stevens (4)	9 – 2 tied	3 – Johnson (12)	Conte Forum (1,309); Chestnut Hill, MA
01/25/2015; 5:00 pm, ESPN2	No. 15	at No. 12 North Carolina	W 74–67 ^{OT}	14–6 (5–2)	33 – Williams (6)	14 – Greenwell (5)	4 – Johnson (13)	Carmichael Arena (6,822); Chapel Hill, NC
01/29/2015; 6:30 pm, ESPN3	No. 17	Pittsburgh	W 62–45	15–6 (6–2)	14 – Stevens (5)	12 – Stevens (7)	4 – 2 tied	Cameron Indoor Stadium (4,333); Durham, NC
02/02/2015; 7:00 pm, ESPN2	No. 15	No. 8 Louisville	W 66–58	16–6 (7–2)	17 – Stevens (6)	9 – 2 tied	3 – 2 tied	Cameron Indoor Stadium (5,790); Durham, NC
02/05/2015; 7:00 pm	No. 15	at Wake Forest	W 70–53	17–6 (8–2)	24 – Stevens (7)	6 – Stevens (8)	8 – Johnson (14)	Joel Coliseum (867); Winston-Salem, NC
02/08/2015; 2:00 pm	No. 15	Clemson	W 89–60	18–6 (9–2)	24 – Williams (7)	12 – Williams (8)	9 – Williams (1)	Cameron Indoor Stadium (4,455); Durham, NC
02/12/2015; 7:00 pm	No. 11	at Virginia	W 71–43	19–6 (10–2)	22 – Greenwell (9)	14 – Stevens (9)	6 – Johnson (15)	John Paul Jones Arena (3,333); Charlottesville, VA
02/16/2015; 9:00 pm, ESPN2	No. 10	at No. 4 Notre Dame	L 50–63	19–7 (10–3)	18 – Williams (8)	11 – Williams (8)	3 – Johnson (16)	Edmund P. Joyce Center (8,659); South Bend, IN
02/22/2015; 12:00 pm, ESPN2	No. 10	at NC State	L 59–72	19–8 (10–4)	19 – Williams (9)	10 – Stevens (10)	3 – 3 tied	Reynolds Coliseum (4,896); Raleigh, NC
02/26/2015; 7:00 pm, ESPN3	No. 16	at Georgia Tech	L 62–71	19–9 (10–5)	16 – 2 tied	14 – Williams (10)	3 – 3 tied	McCamish Pavilion (1,153); Atlanta, GA
03/01/2015; 3:00 pm, ESPN2	No. 16	No. 15 North Carolina	W 81–80	20–9 (11–5)	21 – Stevens (8)	12 – Stevens (10)	4 – Greenwell (2)	Cameron Indoor Stadium (9,314); Durham, NC
ACC Tournament
03/06/2015; 11:00 am, RSN	No. 16	vs. Wake Forest; Quarterfinals	W 77–68	21–9	21 – Cooper (1)	16 – Williams (11)	5 – Williams (2)	Greensboro Coliseum (11,007); Greensboro, NC
03/07/2015; 12:00 pm, ESPNU	No. 16	vs. No. 2 Notre Dame; Semifinals	L 49–55	21–10	15 – Williams (10)	8 – Williams (12)	3 – 2 tied	Greensboro Coliseum (N/A); Greensboro, NC
NCAA tournament
03/20/2015*; 12:00 pm, ESPN2	No. 16	Albany; First Round	W 54–52	22–10	20 – Greenwell (10)	12 – Williams (13)	3 – 3 tied	Cameron Indoor Stadium (N/A); Durham, NC
03/22/2015*; 12:00 pm, ESPN2	No. 16	No. 12 Mississippi State; Second Round	W 64–56	23–10	22 – Stevens (9)	10 – Stevens (11)	4 – 2 tied	Cameron Indoor Stadium (2,293); Durham, NC
03/28/2015*; 4:30 pm, ESPN	No. 16	vs. No. 4 Maryland; Sweet Sixteen	L 55–65	23–11	18 – Williams (11)	9 – Williams (14)	2 – 2 tied	Spokane Arena (N/A); Spokane, WA
*Non-conference game. ^{#}Rankings from AP Poll,. (#) Tournament seedings in parentheses. All times are in Eastern Time.

== Rankings ==
Regular season polls
Poll	Pre- season	Week 2	Week 3	Week 4	Week 5	Week 6	Week 7	Week 8	Week 9	Week 10	Week 11	Week 12	Week 13	Week 14	Week 15	Week 16	Week 17	Week 18	Final
AP	7	7	8	9	13	13	10т	10	13	16	15	17	15	11	10	16	16	16	16
Coaches	7	7	7	8	12	13	10	12	12	14	13	16	15	11	12	17	16	16	16

Legend
	Increase in ranking
	Decrease in ranking
	No change
(RV)	Received votes
(NR)	Not ranked
