= 2014–15 Penn Quakers women's basketball team =

Intercollegiate basketball season

2014–15 Penn Quakers women's basketball

WNIT, Second Round
- Conference: Ivy League
- Record: 21–9 (11–3 Ivy)
- Head coach: Mike McLaughlin (6th season)
- Assistant coaches: Chris Day; Bernadette Laukaitis
- Home arena: Palestra

2014–15 Ivy League women's basketball standings
	Conf.				Overall
Team	W		L	PCT	W		L	PCT
No. 13 Princeton^{†}	14	–	0	1.000	31	–	1	.969
Penn	11	–	3	.786	21	–	9	.700
Harvard	7	–	7	.500	14	–	14	.500
Yale	7	–	7	.500	13	–	15	.464
Cornell	6	–	8	.429	15	–	13	.536
Dartmouth	5	–	9	.357	14	–	14	.500
Brown	4	–	10	.286	10	–	18	.357
Columbia	2	–	12	.143	8	–	20	.286
† Ivy League winner Rankings from AP Poll

The 2014–15 Penn Quakers women's basketball team represented the University of Pennsylvania during the 2014–15 NCAA Division I women's basketball season. The Quakers, led by sixth year head coach Mike McLaughlin, played their home games at the Palestra and were members of the Ivy League.

== Roster ==
2014–15 Penn Quakers women's basketball team
Players
Coaches

Pos.	#	Name	Height	Year	Hometown
F	2	Jackie Falconer	6 ft 0 in (1.83 m)	So	Mechanicsburg, Pa.
G	4	Brooklyn Juday	5 ft 9 in (1.75 m)	Jr	Tipton, Ind.
G	5	Kathleen Roche	5 ft 11 in (1.8 m)	Sr	River Forest, Ill.
G	10	Anna Ross	5 ft 9 in (1.75 m)	Fr	Syracuse, N.Y.
G	11	Melanie Lockett	5 ft 7 in (1.7 m)	So	Monsey, N.Y.
G	12	Kasey Chambers	5 ft 7 in (1.7 m)	Jr	Belmar, N.J.
C	13	Sydney Stipanovich	6 ft 3 in (1.91 m)	So	St. Louis, Mo.
G	14	Beth Brzozowski	5 ft 8 in (1.73 m)	Fr	Highland Heights, Ohio
F	15	Sade Gibbons	6 ft 1 in (1.85 m)	So	Springfield Gardens, N.Y.
G	21	Lauren Whitlatch	5 ft 11 in (1.8 m)	Fr	Bloomington, Ind.
F	22	Kara Bonenberger	6 ft 1 in (1.85 m)	Sr	Walnutport, Pa.
F	23	Katy Allen	6 ft 1 in (1.85 m)	Sr	Waukesha, Wis.
G	24	Renee Busch	5 ft 9 in (1.75 m)	Sr	Weybridge, Surrey, Eng.
G	33	Keiera Ray	5 ft 9 in (1.75 m)	Jr	Aurora, Ill.
F	43	Michelle Nwokedi	6 ft 3 in (1.91 m)	Fr	Missouri City, Texas

Head coach

- Mike McLaughlin

Assistant coach(es)

- Chris Day
- Bernadette Laukaitis

Legend

- (C) Team captain
- (S) Suspended
- (I) Ineligible
- (W) Walk-on
- Injured
- Current redshirt

Roster
Last update: March 2, 2015

== Schedule ==
Date time, TV	Rank^{#}	Opponent^{#}	Result	Record	Site (attendance) city, state
Regular season
11/14/2014*; 7:00 pm		at No. 4 Tennessee	L 52–97	0–1	Thompson–Boling Arena (9,706); Knoxville, TN
11/19/2014*; 7:00 pm		La Salle	W 57–29	1–1	Palestra (492); Philadelphia, PA
11/22/2014*; 7:00 pm		at Navy	W 60–51	2–1	Alumni Hall (528); Annapolis, MD
11/25/2014*; 7:00 pm, ILDN		New Hampshire	W 74–39	3–1	Palestra (317); Philadelphia, PA
12/02/2014*; 7:00 pm		at Lafayette	L 57–60	3–2	Kirby Sports Center (462); Easton, PA
12/05/2014*; 7:00 pm, ILDN		Hampton	L 43–58	3–3	Palestra (372); Philadelphia, PA
12/09/2014*; 5:30 pm, ILDN		Saint Joseph's	W 65–51	4–3	Palestra (503); Philadelphia, PA
12/20/2014*; 2:00 pm		at Drexel; Battle of 33rd Street	L 58–67	4–4	Daskalakis Athletic Center (714); Philadelphia, PA
12/29/2014*; 7:00 pm, ILDN		UMBC	W 69–65	5–4	Palestra (602); Philadelphia, PA
12/31/2014*; 1:00 pm		King's College	W 85–20	6–4	Palestra (701); Philadelphia, PA
01/05/2015*; 7:00 pm, ILDN		Temple	W 52–50	7–4	Palestra (637); Philadelphia, PA
01/10/2015; 2:00 pm, ILDN		at No. 22 Princeton	L 54–83	7–5 (0–1)	Jadwin Gymnasium (1,081); Princeton, NJ
01/14/2015*; 7:00 pm, ILDN		Richmond	W 49–47	8–5	Palestra (477); Philadelphia, PA
01/21/2015*; 5:30 pm, ILDN		Villanova	L 44–70	8–6	Palestra (630); Philadelphia, PA
01/24/2015*; 2:00 pm		at NJIT	W 59–29	9–6	Fleisher Center (356); Newark, NJ
01/30/2015; 7:00 pm, ILDN		at Dartmouth	W 55–39	10–6 (1–1)	Leede Arena (473); Hanover, NH
01/31/2015; 6:00 pm, ESPN3		at Harvard	W 74–69	11–6 (2–1)	Lavietes Pavilion (664); Cambridge, MA
02/06/2015; 7:00 pm, ESPN3		Cornell	L 49–60	11–7 (2–2)	Palestra (1,143); Philadelphia, PA
02/07/2015; 7:00 pm, ESPN3		Columbia	W 78–57	12–7 (3–2)	Palestra (492); Philadelphia, PA
02/13/2015; 7:00 pm, ILDN		at Yale	W 61–42	13–7 (4–2)	John J. Lee Amphitheater (141); New Haven, CT
02/14/2015; 6:00 pm, ILDN		at Brown	W 83–75	14–7 (5–2)	Pizzitola Sports Center (166); Providence, RI
02/20/2015; 7:00 pm, ILDN		Harvard	W 71–61	15–7 (6–2)	Palestra (442); Philadelphia, PA
02/21/2015; 7:00 pm, ESPN3		Dartmouth	W 63–46	16–7 (7–2)	Palestra (891); Philadelphia, PA
02/27/2015; 7:00 pm, ILDN		Brown	W 75–58	17–7 (8–2)	Palestra (678); Philadelphia, PA
02/28/2015; 7:00 pm, ILDN		Yale	W 59–33	18–7 (9–2)	Palestra (1,468); Philadelphia, PA
03/06/2015; 7:00 pm, ILDN		at Columbia	W 50–36	19–7 (10–2)	Levien Gymnasium (395); New York City, NY
03/07/2015; 6:00 pm, ILDN		at Cornell	W 56–42	20–7 (11–2)	Newman Arena (633); Ithaca, NY
03/10/2015; 5:00 pm, CBSSN		No. 13 Princeton	L 42–55	20–8 (11–3)	Palestra (N/A); Philadelphia, PA
2015 WNIT
03/19/2015*; 7:00 pm		Hofstra; First Round	W 65–58	21–8	Palestra (674); Philadelphia, PA
03/23/2015*; 2:00 pm		Temple; Second Round	L 56–61	21–9	Palestra (890); Philadelphia, PA
*Non-conference game. ^{#}Rankings from AP Poll. (#) Tournament seedings in parentheses.

== See also ==
- 2014–15 Penn Quakers men's basketball team
