= 2014–15 Albany Great Danes women's basketball team =

Intercollegiate basketball season

2014–15 Albany Great Danes women's basketball

America East Regular Season Co-Champions America East tournament Champions

NCAA Women's Tournament, first round
- Conference: America East Conference
- Record: 24–9 (14–2 America East)
- Head coach: Katie Abrahamson-Henderson (5th season)
- Assistant coaches: Tahnee Balerio; Mary Grimes; Isoken Uzamere
- Home arena: SEFCU Arena

2014–15 America East Conference women's basketball standings
	Conf.				Overall
Team	W		L	PCT	W		L	PCT
Albany †	14	–	2	.875	24	–	9	.727
Maine	14	–	2	.875	23	–	9	.719
Stony Brook	10	–	6	.625	17	–	14	.548
New Hampshire	9	–	7	.563	17	–	12	.586
Hartford	8	–	8	.500	16	–	17	.485
UMass Lowell*	7	–	9	.438	14	–	15	.483
UMBC	6	–	10	.375	12	–	19	.387
Vermont	2	–	14	.125	5	–	24	.172
Binghamton	2	–	14	.125	4	–	26	.133
† 2015 America East tournament winner As of March 20, 2015 *ineligible for postseason play due to Div. I transitions Rankings from AP poll

The 2014–15 Albany Great Danes women's basketball team represented the University at Albany, SUNY during the 2014–15 NCAA Division I women's basketball season. The Great Danes were led by fifth-year head coach Katie Abrahamson-Henderson and played their home games at SEFCU Arena. They were members of the America East Conference. The Great Danes entered the season as three-time consecutive champions in the America East after winning the 2014 America East tournament. They finished the season 24–9, 14–2 in America East play to share the America East regular season title with Maine. They were also champions of the America East Women's Tournament for the fourth straight year. They received an automatic bid of the NCAA women's tournament, where they lost in the first round to Duke.

== Media ==
All home games and conference road games were streamed on either ESPN3 on AmericaEast.tv. Most road games were streamed on the opponent's website. Selected games were broadcast on the radio on WCDB.

== Roster ==
2014–15 Albany Great Danes women's basketball team
Players
Coaches

Pos.	#	Name	Height	Year	Previous school	Hometown
G	1	Erin Coughlin	5 ft 6 in (1.68 m)	Jr	Tabor Academy	North Attleboro, MA
G	3	Margarita Rosario	5 ft 6 in (1.68 m)	Sr	Felix Varela	Miami, FL
G/F	4	Sarah Royals	5 ft 9 in (1.75 m)	Sr	Torrington	Torrington, CT
G	12	Imani Tate	5 ft 8 in (1.73 m)	So	Bishop Loughlin	Bronx, NY
F	13	Bose Aiyalogbe	6 ft 0 in (1.83 m)	RS Fr	Life Center Academy	Lagos, Nigeria
G/F	15	Jessica Feguiere	5 ft 11 in (1.8 m)	So	Champlain College Saint-Lambert	Montreal, Quebec
G	23	Zakiya Saunders	5 ft 9 in (1.75 m)	So	Carthage Central	Fort Drum, NY
F	25	Shereesha Richards	6 ft 1 in (1.85 m)	Jr	Atlantic Christian	Rae Town, Jamaica
C	32	Megan Craig	6 ft 9 in (2.06 m)	Sr	Kamo	Whangārei, New Zealand
G	34	Cassandra Edwards	5 ft 10 in (1.78 m)	So	Notre Dame CSS	Brampton, Ontario
F/C	22	Tiana-Jo Carter	6 ft 2 in (1.88 m)	Fr	Lake Region	Naples, ME
G	20	Bridget Murphy	5 ft 9 in (1.75 m)	So	Bethlehem Central	Bethlehem, NY

Head coach

- Katie Abrahamson-Henderson (Iowa)

Assistant coach(es)

- Tahnee Balerio (Missouri State)
- Mary Grimes (Siena)
- Isoken Uzamere (Hofstra)

Legend

- (C) Team captain
- (S) Suspended
- (I) Ineligible
- (W) Walk-on
- Injured
- Current redshirt

Roster
Last update: 2014-10-15

== Schedule ==
Date time, TV	Rank^{#}	Opponent^{#}	Result	Record	Site (attendance) city, state
Regular season
11/14/2014*; 7:00 pm, AETV		St. Francis Brooklyn; Preseason WNIT First Round	W 90–47	1–0	SEFCU Arena (1,290); Albany, NY
11/16/2014*; 7:00 pm		at Penn State; Preseason WNIT Second Round	W 54–53	2–0	Bryce Jordan Center (8,607); University Park, PA
11/20/2014*; 8:00 pm		at WKU; Preseason WNIT Semifinals	L 54–63	2–1	E. A. Diddle Arena (1,296); Bowling Green, KY
11/26/2014*; 7:00 pm		at Canisius	W 64–59	3–1	Koessler Athletic Center (715); Buffalo, NY
12/02/2014*; 7:00 pm, AETV		Hofstra	L 55–65	3–2	SEFCU Arena (548); Albany, NY
12/06/2014*; 4:00 pm		at Colgate	W 67–48	4–2	Cotterell Court (370); Hamilton, NY
12/10/2014*; 7:00 pm		at Marist	L 58–61	4–3	McCann Field House (1,417); Poughkeepsie, NY
12/13/2014*; 5:00 pm		at Siena	W 76–57	5–3	Times Union Center (512); Albany, NY
12/15/2014*; 7:00 pm		at Quinnipiac	L 62–66	5–4	TD Bank Sports Center (N/A); Hamden, CT
12/19/2014*; 4:00 pm		at Pepperdine	W 61–36	6–4	Firestone Fieldhouse (311); Malibu, CA
12/21/2014*; 4:00 pm		at Cal State Fullerton	W 71–49	7–4	Titan Gym (110); Fullerton, CA
12/28/2014*; 2:00 pm, AETV		Northeastern	L 67–70	7–5	SEFCU Arena (823); Albany, NY
12/30/2014*; 2:00 pm		at No. 9 North Carolina	L 56–71	7–6	Carmichael Arena (4,123); Chapel Hill, NC
01/03/2015; 12:00 pm, ESPN3		at Maine	W 49–43	8–6 (1–0)	Cross Insurance Center (2,029); Bangor, ME
01/07/2015; 7:00 pm, AETV		New Hampshire	W 76–65	9–6 (2–0)	SEFCU Arena (380); Albany, NY
01/11/2015; 2:00 pm		at UMass Lowell	W 78–50	10–6 (3–0)	Costello Athletic Center (157); Lowell, MA
01/14/2015; 7:00 pm		at Binghamton	W 82–49	11–6 (4–0)	Binghamton University Events Center (1,235); Vestal, NY
01/19/2015; 7:00 pm, AETV		Stony Brook	W 69–59	12–6 (5–0)	SEFCU Arena (1,007); Albany, NY
01/22/2015; 12:00 pm		at UMBC	W 72–62	13–6 (6–0)	Retriever Activities Center (395); Catonsville, MD
01/25/2015; 2:00 pm, AETV/TWCSC		Hartford	W 82–58	14–6 (7–0)	SEFCU Arena (2,185); Albany, NY
01/29/2015; 7:00 pm		at Vermont	W 89–48	15–6 (8–0)	Patrick Gym (342); Burlington, VT
02/01/2015; 1:00 pm, AETV		Maine	L 44–52	15–7 (8–1)	SEFCU Arena (986); Albany, NY
02/04/2015; 7:00 pm		at New Hampshire	W 74–48	16–7 (9–1)	Lundholm Gym (487); Durham, NH
02/07/2015; 5:00 pm, AETV/TWCSC		UMass Lowell	W 93–57	17–7 (10–1)	SEFCU Arena (3,471); Albany, NY
02/11/2015; 12:00 pm, AETV		Binghamton	W 75–53	18–7 (11–1)	SEFCU Arena (1,925); Albany, NY
02/18/2015; 7:00 pm, ESPN3		UMBC	W 84–68	19–7 (12–1)	SEFCU Arena (548); Albany, NY
02/22/2015; 4:00 pm, ESPN3		at Stony Brook	L 64–68	19–8 (12–2)	Island Federal Credit Union Arena (1,098); Stony Brook, NY
02/26/2015; 7:00 pm		at Hartford	W 65–50	20–8 (13–2)	Chase Arena at Reich Family Pavilion (1,492); Hartford, CT
03/01/2015; 2:00 pm, AETV		Vermont	W 76–48	21–8 (14–2)	SEFCU Arena (824); Albany, NY
2015 America East tournament
03/07/2015; 6:00 pm, ESPN3		vs. Vermont; Quarterfinals	W 63–33	22–8	Binghamton University Events Center (N/A); Vestal, NY
03/08/2015; 4:30 pm, ESPN3		vs. UMBC; Semifinals	W 66–37	23–8	Binghamton University Events Center (472); Vestal, NY
03/13/2015; 4:30 pm, ESPNU		Hartford; Championship Game	W 84–75	24–8	SEFCU Arena (1,574); Albany, NY
2015 NCAA Women's Tournament
03/20/2015*; 12:00 pm, ESPN2		at No. 16 Duke; First Round	L 52–54	24–9	Cameron Indoor Stadium (N/A); Durham, NC
*Non-conference game. ^{#}Rankings from AP Poll. (#) Tournament seedings in parentheses. All times are in Eastern Time.

== Rankings ==
+ Regular season polls	Poll	Pre- season	Week 2	Week 3	Week 4	Week 5	Week 6	Week 7	Week 8	Week 9	Week 10	Week 11	Week 12	Week 13	Week 14	Week 15	Week 16	Week 17	Week 18	Final
AP	RV	RV	NR	NR	NR	NR	NR	NR	NR	NR	NR	NR	NR	NR	NR	NR	NR	NR	NR	
Coaches	RV	RV	RV	RV	NR	NR	NR	NR	NR	NR	NR	NR	NR	NR	NR	NR	NR	NR	NR	

Legend
	Increase in ranking
	Decrease in ranking
	No change
(RV)	Received votes
(NR)	Not ranked

== See also ==
- 2014–15 Albany Great Danes men's basketball team
- Albany Great Danes women's basketball
