= 2014–15 New Hampshire Wildcats women's basketball team =

Intercollegiate basketball season

2014–15 New Hampshire Wildcats women's basketball
- Conference: America East Conference
- Record: 17–12 (9–7 America East)
- Head coach: Maureen Magarity (5th season)
- Assistant coaches: Mike Roux (5th season); Brendan Copes (2nd season); Kelsey Hogan (1st season)
- Home arena: Lundholm Gym

2014–15 America East Conference women's basketball standings
	Conf.				Overall
Team	W		L	PCT	W		L	PCT
Albany †	14	–	2	.875	24	–	9	.727
Maine	14	–	2	.875	23	–	9	.719
Stony Brook	10	–	6	.625	17	–	14	.548
New Hampshire	9	–	7	.563	17	–	12	.586
Hartford	8	–	8	.500	16	–	17	.485
UMass Lowell*	7	–	9	.438	14	–	15	.483
UMBC	6	–	10	.375	12	–	19	.387
Vermont	2	–	14	.125	5	–	24	.172
Binghamton	2	–	14	.125	4	–	26	.133
† 2015 America East tournament winner As of March 20, 2015 *ineligible for postseason play due to Div. I transitions Rankings from AP poll

The 2014–15 New Hampshire Wildcats women's basketball team represented the University of New Hampshire in the America East Conference. The Wildcats were led by fifth-year head coach Maureen Magarity and once again played their home games in Lundholm Gym. They finished the season 17–12, 9–7 in America East play to finish in fourth place. They lost in the quarterfinals of the America East women's tournament to Hartford. Despite finishing with 17 wins, they were not invited to a postseason tournament.

== Media ==
All non-televised home games and conference road games were streamed on either ESPN3 or AmericaEast.tv. Select home games aired on Fox College Sports, Live Well Network, or WBIN. Most road games were streamed on the opponent's website. All conference home games and select non-conference home games were broadcast on the radio on WPKX and WGIR, and online on the New Hampshire Portal.

== Roster ==
2014–15 New Hampshire Wildcats women's basketball team
Players
Coaches

Pos.	#	Name	Height	Year	Previous school	Hometown
G	1	Ariel Gaston	5 ft 7 in (1.7 m)	Sr	Start	Toledo, OH
G	3	Madi Rowan	5 ft 9 in (1.75 m)	So	Central Valley	Aliquippa, PA
G	4	Kristen Anderson	5 ft 7 in (1.7 m)	So	Leavitt	Greene, ME
G	5	Elizabeth Belanger	5 ft 10 in (1.78 m)	Jr	Acton-Boxborough Regional	Acton, MA
G	10	Aliza Simpson	5 ft 9 in (1.75 m)	Fr	Londonderry	Londonderry, NH
F	11	Kaylee Kilpatrick	6 ft 4 in (1.93 m)	Sr	Harbour View	Saint John, New Brunswick
G/F	12	Sarah-Marie Frankenberger	5 ft 10 in (1.78 m)	Sr	Theresianum Mainz	Gross Gerau, Germany
F	15	Corinne Coia	6 ft 4 in (1.93 m)	Jr	Liberty	North Smithfield, RI
G	20	Peyton Booth	5 ft 10 in (1.78 m)	Fr	Wadsworth	Mansfield, OH
G	22	Madison Lopez	5 ft 11 in (1.8 m)	Sr	Cochise College	Albuquerque, NM
G	25	Emily Peters	5 ft 6 in (1.68 m)	Fr	Forest Lake	Lindstrom, MN
C	32	Carlie Pogue	6 ft 2 in (1.88 m)	Fr	Princeton	Cincinnati, OH
G/F	33	Stephanie Spoto	6 ft 0 in (1.83 m)	Sr	Pittsford Sutherland	Pittsford, NY
C	50	Morgan Bassett-Smith	6 ft 2 in (1.88 m)	Fr	Pickerington North	Pickerington, OH

Head coach

- Maureen Magarity, (Marist)

Assistant coach(es)

- Mike Roux, (Assumption)
- Brendan Copes, (Marist)
- Kelsey Hogan, (New Hampshire)

Legend

- (C) Team captain
- (S) Suspended
- (I) Ineligible
- (W) Walk-on
- Injured
- Current redshirt

Roster
Last update: 2014-07-10

== Schedule ==
Date time, TV	Rank^{#}	Opponent^{#}	Result	Record	Site (attendance) city, state
Regular season
11/14/2014*; 11:00 am		NJIT	W 61–56	1–0	Lundholm Gym (2,057); Durham, NH
11/18/2014*; 5:00 pm		at Howard	W 78–68	2–0	Burr Gymnasium (157); Washington, D.C.
11/22/2014*; 7:00 pm		Brown	W 60–57	3–0	Lundholm Gym (387); Durham, NH
11/25/2014*; 7:00 pm		at Penn	L 39–74	3–1	Palestra (317); Philadelphia, PA
11/30/2014*; 1:00 pm		Central Connecticut	L 58–64	3–2	Lundholm Gym (317); Durham, NH
12/03/2014*; 5:30 pm		at Boston University	W 67–55	4–2	Case Gym (723); Boston, MA
12/07/2014*; 1:00 pm		Daniel Webster	W 84–32	5–2	Lundholm Gym (N/A); Durham, NH
12/14/2014*; 4:00 pm		at Boston College	L 58–64	5–3	Conte Forum (588); Chestnut Hill, MA
12/18/2014*; 7:00 pm		Dartmouth; Rivalry	W 60–44	6–3	Lundholm Gym (316); Durham, NH
12/22/2014*; 2:00 pm		at Northeastern	W 63–62	7–3	Cabot Center (119); Boston, MA
12/28/2014*; 2:00 pm		at Manhattan	W 58–54	8–3	Draddy Gymnasium (164); Riverdale, NY
12/31/2014*; 3:00 pm		Bryant	L 54–57	8–4	Lundholm Gym (374); Durham, NH
01/03/2015; 12:00 pm		at Stony Brook	W 60–52	9–4 (1–0)	Island Federal Credit Union Arena (3,224); Stony Brook, NY
01/07/2015; 7:00 pm		at Albany	L 65–76	9–5 (1–1)	SEFCU Arena (380); Albany, NY
01/10/2015; 1:00 pm		UMBC	W 67–45	10–5 (2–1)	Lundholm Gym (372); Durham, NH
01/14/2015; 11:30 am		at Vermont	W 64–56	11–5 (3–1)	Patrick Gym (1,294); Burlington, VT
01/17/2015; 1:00 pm		Binghamton	W 73–68	12–5 (4–1)	Lundholm Gym (471); Durham, NH
01/19/2015; 1:00 pm		UMass Lowell	W 58–51	13–5 (5–1)	Lundholm Gym (407); Durham, NH
01/21/2015; 7:00 pm		at Hartford	W 65–63	14–5 (6–1)	Chase Arena at Reich Family Pavilion (981); Hartford, CT
01/29/2015; 7:00 pm		at Maine	L 56–87	14–6 (6–2)	Cross Insurance Center (1,456); Bangor, ME
02/01/2015; 1:00 pm		Stony Brook	L 52–60	14–7 (6–3)	Lundholm Gym (461); Durham, NH
02/04/2015; 7:00 pm		Albany	L 48–74	14–8 (6–4)	Lundholm Gym (487); Durham, NH
02/07/2015; 1:00 pm		at UMBC	L 55–69	14–9 (6–5)	Retriever Activities Center (412); Catonsville, MD
02/11/2015; 7:00 pm		Vermont	L 60–63	14–10 (6–6)	Lundholm Gym (408); Durham, NH
02/14/2015; 2:00 pm, ESPN3		at Binghamton	W 76–58	15–10 (7–6)	Binghamton University Events Center (1,571); Vestal, NY
02/18/2015; 7:00 pm		Hartford	W 55–50	16–10 (8–6)	Lundholm Gym (N/A); Durham, NH
02/21/2015; 1:00 pm		at UMass Lowell	L 65–70	16–11 (8–7)	Tsongas Center (1,950); Lowell, MA
03/01/2015; 1:00 pm		Maine	W 61–47	17–11 (9–7)	Lundholm Gym (1,241); Durham, NH
2015 America East tournament
03/07/2015; 2:15 pm, ESPN3		vs. Hartford; Quarterfinals	L 42–58	17–12	Binghamton University Events Center (N/A); Vestal, NY
*Non-conference game. ^{#}Rankings from AP Poll. (#) Tournament seedings in parentheses. All times are in Eastern Time.

== See also ==
- 2014–15 New Hampshire Wildcats men's basketball team
- New Hampshire Wildcats women's basketball
