= List of Delaware Fightin' Blue Hens women's basketball head coaches =

The Delaware Fightin' Blue Hens women's basketball team represents the University of Delaware in the Colonial Athletic Association (CAA). The Fightin' Blue Hens compete as part of the National Collegiate Athletic Association (NCAA) Division I. The program has had 5 head coaches since it began play in 1969, Natasha Adair is currently the head coach.

== Season by season ==
Statistics overview
Season	Coach	Overall	Conference	Standing	Postseason
Susana Occhi () (1969–1971)
Susana Occhi:		(–)			
Mary Ann Hitchens () (1971–1978)
1971-72	Mary Ann Hitchens	8-4			3rd Place, EAIAW Regionals
1972-73	Mary Ann Hitchens	9-5			3rd Place, EAIAW Regionals
1973-74	Mary Ann Hitchens	8-7			3rd Place, Mid-Atlantic Regionals
1974-75	Mary Ann Hitchens	12-5			3rd Place, EAIAW Regionals
1975-76	Mary Ann Hitchens	12-6			3rd Place, EAIAW Regionals
1976-77	Mary Ann Hitchens	9-9			3rd Place, EAIAW Regionals
1977-78	Mary Ann Hitchens	12-6			2nd Place, EAIAW Regionals
Mary Ann Hitchens:		70-42 (.625)			
Joyce Perry () (1978–1982)
1978-79	Joyce Perry	6-11			
1979-80	Joyce Perry	7-13			
1980-81	Joyce Perry	21-7			
1981-82	Joyce Perry	9-14			
Joyce Perry (East Coast Conference) (1982–1991)
1982-83	Joyce Perry	12-12	4-4	1st, ECC West	
1983-84	Joyce Perry	22-4	8-0	1st	
1984-85	Joyce Perry	19-9	11-3	2nd	
1985-86	Joyce Perry	15-15	8-6	3rd	
1986-87	Joyce Perry	10-17	5-9	6th	
1987-88	Joyce Perry	18-11	9-5	3rd	
1988-89	Joyce Perry	23-6	13-1	1st	
1989-90	Joyce Perry	21-9	10-4	1st	
1990-91	Joyce Perry	18-11	10-2	1st	
Delaware (East Coast):		158-94 (.627)	78-34(.696)		
Joyce Perry (North Atlantic Conference) (1991–1996)
1991-92	Joyce Perry	15-14	7-7	4th	
1992-93	Joyce Perry	17-11	8-6	4th	
1993-94	Joyce Perry	10-17	7-7	5th	
1994-95	Joyce Perry	12-15	5-10	7th	
1995-96	Joyce Perry	11-16	9-9	5th	
Delaware (North Atlantic):		65-73(.471)	36-39(.480)		
Joyce Perry:		266-212 (.556)	114-73 (.610)		
Tina Martin (America East Conference) (1996–2001)
1996-97	Tina Martin	9-19	6-12	7th	
1997-98	Tina Martin	6-21	3-15	10th	
1998-99	Tina Martin	16-11	10-8	5th	
1999-00	Tina Martin	21-8	13-5	3rd	
2000-01	Tina Martin	26-5	17-1	1st	NCAA 1st Round
Delaware (America East):		78–64 (.549)	49–41 (.544)		
Tina Martin (Colonial Athletic Association) (2001–2017)
2001-02	Tina Martin	23-7	15-3	2nd	WNIT 1st Round
2002-03	Tina Martin	22-9	15-3	T-1st	WNIT 1st Round
2003-04	Tina Martin	19-10	10-8	4th	
2004-05	Tina Martin	25-6	16-2	1st	WNIT 1st Round
2005-06	Tina Martin	22-8	13-5	3rd	WNIT 1st Round
2006-07	Tina Martin	26-6	16-2	T-2nd	NCAA 1st Round
2007-08	Tina Martin	7-24	6-12	9th	
2008-09	Tina Martin	15-15	7-11	9th	
2009-10	Tina Martin	21-12	11-7	4th	WNIT 1st Round
2010-11	Tina Martin	20-14	10-8	T-5th	WNIT 1st Round
2011-12	Tina Martin	31-2	18-0	1st	NCAA 2nd Round
2012-13	Tina Martin	32-4	18-0	1st	NCAA Sweet Sixteen
2013-14	Tina Martin	20-11	10-6	3rd	WNIT 1st Round
2014-15	Tina Martin	15-17	8-10	7th	
2015-16	Tina Martin	16-15	10-8	5th	
2016-17	Tina Martin	16-14	10-8	5th	
Delaware (CAA):		330–174 (.655)	193–93 (.675)		
Tina Martin:		408-238 (.632)	242-134 (.644)		
Natasha Adair (Colonial Athletic Association) (2017–2021)
2017-18	Natasha Adair	19-13	11-7	5th	WNIT 1st Round
2018-19	Natasha Adair	16-15	11-7	T-3rd	
2019-20	Natasha Adair	12-17	8-10	6th	
2020-21	Natasha Adair	24-5	16-2	1st	WNIT semifinals
Natasha Adair:		71-50 (.587)	46-26 (.639)		
Total:		815-542 (.601)			
National champion Postseason invitational champion Conference regular season champion Conference regular season and conference tournament champion Division regular season champion Division regular season and conference tournament champion Conference tournament champion
