= 2011–12 Delaware Fightin' Blue Hens women's basketball team =

Intercollegiate basketball season

2011–12 Delaware Fightin' Blue Hens women's basketball

CAA regular season & tournament champions

NCAA women's tournament, second round
- Conference: Colonial Athletic Association

Ranking
- Coaches: No. 14
- AP: No. 7
- Record: 31–2 (18–0 CAA)
- Head coach: Tina Martin (16th season)
- Assistant coaches: Jeanine Radice; Tom Lochner; Tiara Malcom
- Home arena: Bob Carpenter Center

2011–12 CAA women's basketball standings
	Conf.				Overall
Team	W		L	PCT	W		L	PCT
No. 7 Delaware†	18	–	0	1.000	31	–	2	.939
James Madison	14	–	4	.778	24	–	7	.774
Drexel	12	–	6	.667	18	–	13	.581
Hofstra	11	–	7	.611	19	–	11	.633
UNC Wilmington	11	–	7	.611	20	–	12	.625
VCU	9	–	9	.500	17	–	14	.548
George Mason	8	–	10	.444	15	–	16	.484
Towson	7	–	11	.389	16	–	14	.533
Old Dominion	7	–	11	.389	11	–	21	.344
Northeastern	6	–	12	.333	8	–	22	.267
William & Mary	3	–	15	.167	10	–	20	.333
Georgia State	2	–	16	.111	8	–	22	.267
† 2012 CAA tournament winner Rankings from AP poll

The 2011–12 Delaware Fightin' Blue Hens women's basketball team represented the University of Delaware during the 2011–12 NCAA Division I women's basketball season. The Fightin' Blue Hens, led by sixteenth year head coach Tina Martin, played their home games at the Bob Carpenter Center and were members of the Colonial Athletic Association. They finished the season 31–2, going 18-0 in CAA play to win their second CAA regular season championship. They won the 2012 CAA Women's Basketball Tournament, defeating Drexel in the finals to win their first CAA title. A #3 seed in the Des Moines region of the NCAA Division I women's basketball tournament, the Blue Hens defeated #14 seed Arkansas-Little Rock for the first Delaware NCAA Basketball tournament win, men's or women's, before falling to #11 seed Kansas in the second round.

== Roster ==
2011–12 Delaware Fightin' Blue Hens women's basketball team
Players
Coaches

Pos.	#	Name	Height	Year	Previous school	Hometown
G	1	Vanessa Kabongo (C)	5 ft 10 in (1.78 m)	Sr	Eastern Commerce	Toronto, Ontario
G	2	Jocelyn Bailey (C)	6 ft 0 in (1.83 m)	Sr	Bullis School	Kensington, Maryland
G	3	Jaquetta May	5 ft 9 in (1.75 m)	Jr	Delcastle Tech HS	Wilmington, Delaware
G	4	Meghan McLean	5 ft 9 in (1.75 m)	Sr	Upper St. Clair HS	Pittsburgh, Pennsylvania
G	5	Nina Deal	6 ft 0 in (1.83 m)	Fr	Alain Fournier	Corcelles-en-Beaujolais, France
G	10	Kayla Miller	5 ft 8 in (1.73 m)	Jr	Ursuline Academy	Wilmington, Delaware
F	11	Elena Delle Donne (C)	6 ft 5 in (1.96 m)	Jr	Ursuline Academy	Wilmington, Delaware
F	12	Danielle Parker	6 ft 2 in (1.88 m)	Jr	Dulaney HS	Phoenix, Maryland
F	13	Kelsey Buchanan	6 ft 3 in (1.91 m)	So	Freedom HS	South Riding, Virginia
G	15	Akeema Richards	5 ft 7 in (1.7 m)	So	Western HS	Baltimore, Maryland
G	21	Trumae Lucas	5 ft 8 in (1.73 m)	RS Jr	Grimsley HS	Greensboro, North Carolina
G	22	Lauren Carra	5 ft 9 in (1.75 m)	Jr	Dunmore HS	Dunmore, Pennsylvania
C	33	Stephanie Leon	6 ft 3 in (1.91 m)	Fr	Northport HS	Northport, New York
F	45	Chelsea Craig	6 ft 2 in (1.88 m)	Jr	Wooton HS	Rockville, Maryland
C	51	Sarah Acker	6 ft 3 in (1.91 m)	Sr	Great Nanticoke HS	Nanticoke, Pennsylvania

Head coach

- Tina Martin (Lock Haven)

Assistant coach(es)

- Jeanine Radice (Fordham)
- Tom Lochner (Temple)
- Tiara Malcom (Delaware)

Legend

- (C) Team captain
- (S) Suspended
- (I) Ineligible
- (W) Walk-on
- Injured
- Current redshirt

Roster
Last update: 17 March 2017

== Schedule ==
Date time, TV	Rank^{#}	Opponent^{#}	Result	Record	Site (attendance) city, state
Regular season
11/11/2011*; 7:00 pm		Rhode Island	W 89-53	1-0	Bob Carpenter Center (3,211); Newark, Delaware
11/17/2011*; 7:00 pm		No. 11 Penn State	W 80-71	2-0	Bob Carpenter Center (3,352); Newark, Delaware
11/22/2011*; 7:00 pm		at Villanova	W 64-56	3-0	The Pavilion (1,517); Villanova, Pennsylvania
11/27/2011*; 1:00 pm		at St. Bonaventure	W 61-49	4-0	Reilly Center (417); St. Bonaventure, New York
12/01/2011*; 7:00 pm	No. 24	at Princeton	W 81-70	5-0	Jadwin Gymnasium (1,824); Princeton, New Jersey
12/04/2011; 2:00 pm	No. 24	William & Mary	W 73-57	6-0 (1-0)	Bob Carpenter Center (3,365); Newark, Delaware
12/05/2011*; 7:00 pm	No. 22	Yale	W 77-45	7-0	Bob Carpenter Center (2,439); Newark, Delaware
12/11/2011*; 2:00 pm	No. 22	at Wake Forest	W 70-57	8-0	Joel Coliseum (507); Winston-Salem, North Carolina
12/19/2011*; 7:05 pm	No. 19	at Providence	W 68-47	9-0	Alumni Hall (187); Providence, Rhode Island
12/28/2011*; 2:30 pm	No. 19	vs. East Carolina; Terrapin Classic at Maryland	W 60-40	10-0	Comcast Center (4,795); College Park, Maryland
12/29/2011*; 7:00 pm	No. 19	at No. 5 Maryland; Terrapin Classic at Maryland	L 76-85	10-1	Comcast Center (8,733); College Park, Maryland
01/05/2012; 7:00 pm	No. 21	Towson	W 74-51	11-1 (2-0)	Bob Carpenter Center (3,804); Newark, Delaware
01/08/2012; 2:00 pm	No. 21	George Mason	W 66-54	12-1 (3-0)	Patriot Center (670); Fairfax, Virginia
01/12/2012; 7:00 pm	No. 20	UNC Wilmington	W 69-37	13-1 (4-0)	Bob Carpenter Center (3,552); Newark, Delaware
01/15/2012; 2:00 pm	No. 20	at Northeastern	W 70-54	14-1 (5-0)	Solomon Court (282); Boston, Massachusetts
01/19/2012; 7:00 pm	No. 16	at Towson	W 65-46	15-1 (6-0)	Towson Center (1,041); Towson, Maryland
01/22/2012; 3:30 pm, CSN	No. 16	at Drexel	W 60-49	16-1 (7-0)	Bob Carpenter Center (5,021); Newark, Delaware
01/26/2012; 7:00 pm	No. 15	Hofstra	W 84-66	17-1 (8-0)	Bob Carpenter Center (3,510); Newark, Delaware
01/29/2012; 7:00 pm, CSN	No. 15	at James Madison	W 72–65	18-1 (9-0)	JMU Convocation Center (4,637); Harrisonburg, Virginia
02/02/2012; 7:00 pm	No. 12	at UNC Wilmington	W 62-53	19-1 (10-0)	Trask Coliseum (1,253); Wilmington, North Carolina
02/05/2012; 2:00 pm	No. 12	Virginia Commonwealth	W 68-49	20-1 (11-0)	Bob Carpenter Center (4,646); Newark, Delaware
02/09/2012; 7:00 pm	No. 12	Old Dominion	W 76-63	21-1 (12-0)	Bob Carpenter Center (4,111); Newark, Delaware
02/12/2012; 2:00 pm	No. 12	at Georgia State	W 94-56	22-1 (13-0)	GSU Sports Arena (602); Atlanta, Georgia
02/16/2012; 7:00 pm	No. 10	at Hofstra	W 89-79	23-1 (14-0)	Mack Sports Complex (1,194); Hempstead, New York
02/19/2012; 2:00 pm	No. 10	at Drexel	W 40-39	24-1 (15-0)	Daskalakis Athletic Center (2,532); Philadelphia, Pennsylvania
02/23/2012; 7:00 pm	No. 9	George Mason	W 71-53	25-1 (16-0)	Bob Carpenter Center (4,824); Newark, Delaware
02/26/2012; 2:00 pm	No. 9	Northeastern	W 89-71	26-1 (17-0)	Bob Carpenter Center (5,043); Newark, Delaware
02/29/2012; 7:00 pm	No. 8	at William & Mary	W 79-53	27-1 (18-0)	Kaplan Arena (953); Williamsburg, Virginia
CAA tournament
03/09/2012; 12:00 pm	No. 7	vs. Old Dominion; Quarterfinals	W 74-54	28-1	Show Place Arena (2,401); Upper Marlboro, Maryland
03/10/2012; 12:00 pm, CSN	No. 7	vs. UNC Wilmington; Semifinals	W 66-39	29-1	Show Place Arena (1,926); Upper Marlboro, Maryland
03/11/2012; 12:30 pm, CSN	No. 7	vs. Drexel; CAA Championship	W 59-43	30-1	Show Place Arena (2,223); Upper Marlboro, Maryland
NCAA tournament
03/18/2015*; 4:20 pm, ESPN2	(3) No. 7	at (14) Arkansas-Little Rock; First Round	W 73-42	31-1	Jack Stephens Center (3,466); Little Rock, Arkansas
03/20/2012*; 8:40 pm, ESPN2	(3) No. 7	vs. (11) Kansas; Second Round	L 60-70	31-2	Jack Stephens Center (2,744); Little Rock, Arkansas
*Non-conference game. ^{#}Rankings from AP Poll. (#) Tournament seedings in parentheses. All times are in Eastern Time.

== Rankings ==
Ranking movements Legend: ██ Increase in ranking ██ Decrease in ranking — = Not ranked RV = Received votes
	Week																			
Poll	Pre	2	3	4	5	6	7	8	9	10	11	12	13	14	15	16	17	18	Post	Final
AP	RV	RV	RV	24	22	21	19	19	21	20	16	15	12	12	10	9	8	7	7	N/A
Coaches	—	—	RV	RV	25	23	20	20	20	18	16	16	13	12	9	8	8	8	8	14

== Awards and honors ==
- Elena Delle Donne won a gold medal representing Team USA in the 2011 World University Games in August 2011.
- Elena Delle Donne was a consensus 1st team All-American (AP, CSM, WBCA, Wooden, USBWA) and the CoSIDA Academic All-American of the Year.
- Elena Delle Donne received CAA Player of the Year, first team All-CAA selection, and CAA All-Defensive team, while Lauren Carra was selected to the third team All-CAA.
