= 2014–15 UNC Wilmington Seahawks women's basketball team =

Intercollegiate basketball season

2014–15 UNC Wilmington Seahawks women's basketball
- Conference: Colonial Athletic Association
- Record: 14–16 (10–8 CAA)
- Head coach: Adell Harris (3rd season)
- Assistant coaches: Richard Moore; Kim Tingley; Jason Eshbaugh
- Home arena: Trask Coliseum

2014–15 CAA women's basketball standings
	Conf.				Overall
Team	W		L	PCT	W		L	PCT
James Madison†	17	–	1	.944	29	–	4	.879
Drexel	14	–	4	.778	20	–	11	.645
Hofstra	11	–	7	.611	20	–	13	.606
Elon	11	–	7	.611	19	–	13	.594
UNC Wilmington	10	–	8	.556	14	–	16	.467
William & Mary	9	–	9	.500	15	–	16	.484
Delaware	8	–	10	.444	15	–	17	.469
Towson	6	–	12	.333	11	–	21	.344
College of Charleston	3	–	15	.167	5	–	25	.167
Northeastern	1	–	17	.056	4	–	25	.138
† 2015 CAA tournament winner Rankings from AP poll

The 2014–15 UNC Wilmington Seahawks women's basketball team represented the University of North Carolina Wilmington during the 2014–15 NCAA Division I women's basketball season. The Seahawks, led by third year head coach Adell Harris, played their home games at the Trask Coliseum and were members of the Colonial Athletic Association. They finished the season 14–16, 10–8 in CAA play to finish in fifth place. They lost in the quarterfinals of the CAA women's tournament to Elon.

== Roster ==
2014–15 UNC Wilmington Seahawks women's basketball team
Players
Coaches

Pos.	#	Name	Height	Year	Previous school	Hometown
G	1	Naqaiyyah Teague	5 ft 7 in (1.7 m)	So	Malcolm X Shabazz	Newark, New Jersey
G	2	Brie Mobley	5 ft 8 in (1.73 m)	So	Winter Haven	Winter Haven, Florida
G	3	Kelva Atkins	5 ft 4 in (1.63 m)	Sr	Granville Central; Columbia State	Stem, North Carolina
G	5	Shatia Cole	5 ft 6 in (1.68 m)	RS Jr	Myrtle Beach; Coastal Carolina	Myrtle Beach, South Carolina
G	10	Madison Raque	5 ft 8 in (1.73 m)	Fr	Eastern	Louisville, Kentucky
G	11	Jasmine Steele	5 ft 1 in (1.55 m)	RS So	Midfield; Alabama	Birmingham, Alabama
F	20	Jordan Henry	6 ft 3 in (1.91 m)	RS So	Marvin Ridge	Waxhawm, North Carolina
G	22	Amber Reeves	5 ft 9 in (1.75 m)	So	North Cobb	Marietta, Georgia
G	25	D'Asia Cain	5 ft 11 in (1.8 m)	So	Campbell	Smyrna, Georgia
C	32	Rebekah Banks	6 ft 1 in (1.85 m)	Fr	Cary Academy	Durham, North Carolina
F	33	Sarah Myatt	6 ft 2 in (1.88 m)	RS Fr	Southern Alamance; Queens	Snow Camp, North Carolina
G	34	Johanna McMillan	5 ft 7 in (1.7 m)	So	Sanford School	Mullica Hill, New Jersey
F	45	Ryan Flowers	6 ft 2 in (1.88 m)	So	Millbrook	Hickory, North Carolina

Head coach

Adell Harris

Assistant coach(es)

Richard Moore
Kim Tingley
Jason Eshbaugh

Legend

- (C) Team captain
- (S) Suspended
- (I) Ineligible
- (W) Walk-on
- Injured
- Current redshirt

Roster

== Schedule ==
Date time, TV	Rank^{#}	Opponent^{#}	Result	Record	Site (attendance) city, state
Exhibition
11/08/2014*; 2:00 pm		Mount Olive	W 83–63	–	Trask Coliseum (534); Wilmington, North Carolina
Regular season
11/16/2014*; 2:00 pm		UNC Pembroke	W 75–38	1–0	Trask Coliseum (731); Wilmington, North Carolina
11/19/2014*; 7:00 pm		Campbell	W 89–80	2–0	Trask Coliseum (537); Wilmington, North Carolina
11/22/2014*; 2:00 pm		at Appalachian State	L 72–82	2–1	Holmes Center (347); Boone, North Carolina
11/28/2014*; 2:00 pm		North Florida; UNCW Hampton Inn Thanksgiving Classic	L 41–55	2–2	Trask Coliseum (712); Wilmington, North Carolina
11/29/2014*; 2:00 pm		Western Carolina; UNCW Hampton Inn Thanksgiving Classic	L 53–64	2–3	Trask Coliseum (698); Wilmington, North Carolina
12/02/2014*; 7:00 pm		VCU	L 53–59	2–4	Trask Coliseum (466); Wilmington, North Carolina
12/17/2014*; 4:30 pm		Richmond	L 67–77	2–5	Trask Coliseum (366); Wilmington, North Carolina
12/19/2014*; 12:00 pm		East Tennessee State; Seahawks Hampton Inn Christmas Invitational	W 61–48	3–5	Trask Coliseum (5,141); Wilmington, North Carolina
12/20/2014*; 2:30 pm		Charleston Southern; Seahawks Hampton Inn Christmas Invitational	W 80–70	4–5	Trask Coliseum (626); Wilmington, North Carolina
12/29/2014*; 7:00 pm		at Florida Atlantic	L 80–84	4–6	FAU Arena (780); Boca Raton, Florida
12/31/2014*; 1:00 pm, ESPN3		at Stetson	L 55–72	4–7	Edmunds Center (487); DeLand, Florida
01/04/2015; 2:00 pm		William & Mary	W 63–62	5–7 (1–0)	Trask Coliseum (421); Wilmington, North Carolina
01/06/2015; 7:00 pm		at James Madison	L 57–74	5–8 (1–1)	JMU Convocation Center (2,020); Harrisonburg, Virginia
01/09/2015; 11:30 am		College of Charleston	W 69–57	6–8 (2–1)	Trask Coliseum (2,488); Wilmington, North Carolina
01/11/2015; 2:00 pm		at Drexel	L 53–58	6–9 (2–2)	Daskalakis Athletic Center (596); Philadelphia
01/16/2015; 7:00 pm		at Northeastern	L 64–73	6–10 (2–3)	Cabot Center (330); Boston
01/18/2015; 1:00 pm		at Hofstra	L 57–71	6–11 (2–4)	Hofstra Arena (141); Hempstead, New York
01/22/2015; 7:00 pm		Elon	W 76–68	7–11 (3–4)	Trask Coliseum (563); Wilmington, North Carolina
01/25/2015; 2:00 pm		Towson	W 71–63	8–11 (4–4)	Trask Coliseum (521); Wilmington, North Carolina
01/29/2015; 7:00 pm		at William & Mary	L 62–67	8–12 (4–5)	Kaplan Arena (409); Williamsburg, Virginia
02/01/2015; 1:00 pm		Drexel	L 44–61	8–13 (4–6)	Trask Coliseum (689); Wilmington, North Carolina
02/08/2015; 2:00 pm		at Delaware	L 60–69	8–14 (4–7)	Bob Carpenter Center (2,231); Newark, Delaware
02/12/2015; 7:00 pm		at Elon	L 82–86	9–14 (5–7)	Alumni Gym (482); Elon, North Carolina
02/15/2015; 7:00 pm		Northeastern	W 84–78	10–14 (6–7)	Trask Coliseum (702); Wilmington, North Carolina
02/19/2015; 7:00 pm		No. 23 James Madison	L 49–85	10–15 (6–8)	Trask Coliseum (587); Wilmington, North Carolina
02/22/2015; 2:00 pm		at Towson	W 73–71 ^{OT}	11–15 (7–8)	SECU Arena (481); Towson, Maryland
02/26/2015; 7:00 pm		Delaware	W 71–68 ^{OT}	12–15 (8–8)	Trask Coliseum (413); Wilmington, North Carolina
03/01/2015; 1:00 pm, ASN		at College of Charleston	W 76–65	13–15 (9–8)	TD Arena (232); Charleston, South Carolina
03/04/2015; 7:00 pm		Hofstra	W 76–75	14–15 (10–8)	Trask Coliseum (404); Wilmington, North Carolina
2015 CAA Tournament
03/13/2015; 2:30 pm, ASN		vs. Elon; Quarterfinals	L 48–60	14–16	Show Place Arena (N/A); Upper Marlboro, Maryland
*Non-conference game. ^{#}Rankings from AP Poll. (#) Tournament seedings in parentheses. All times are in Eastern Time.

== See also ==
- 2014–15 UNC Wilmington Seahawks men's basketball team
