= 2014–15 Elon Phoenix women's basketball team =

Intercollegiate basketball season

2014–15 Elon Phoenix women's basketball
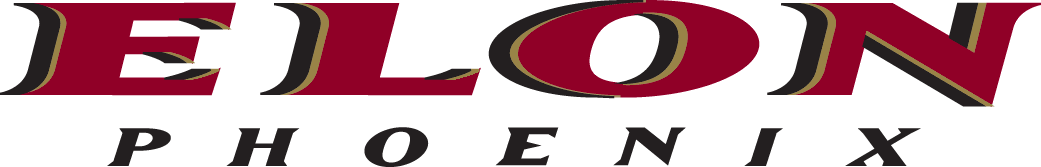

WNIT, First Round
- Conference: Colonial Athletic Association
- Record: 19–13 (11–7 CAA)
- Head coach: Charlotte Smith (4th season)
- Assistant coaches: Cristy McKinney; Josh Wick; Tasha Taylor
- Home arena: Alumni Gym

2014–15 CAA women's basketball standings
	Conf.				Overall
Team	W		L	PCT	W		L	PCT
James Madison†	17	–	1	.944	29	–	4	.879
Drexel	14	–	4	.778	20	–	11	.645
Hofstra	11	–	7	.611	20	–	13	.606
Elon	11	–	7	.611	19	–	13	.594
UNC Wilmington	10	–	8	.556	14	–	16	.467
William & Mary	9	–	9	.500	15	–	16	.484
Delaware	8	–	10	.444	15	–	17	.469
Towson	6	–	12	.333	11	–	21	.344
College of Charleston	3	–	15	.167	5	–	25	.167
Northeastern	1	–	17	.056	4	–	25	.138
† 2015 CAA tournament winner Rankings from AP poll

The 2014–15 Elon Phoenix women's basketball team represented Elon University during the 2014–15 NCAA Division I women's basketball season. The Phoenix, led by fourth-year head coach Charlotte Smith, played their home games at Alumni Gym and were first-year members of the Colonial Athletic Association. They finished the season 19–13, 11–7 in CAA play finish in a tie for third place. They advanced to the semifinals of the CAA women's tournament, where they lost to James Madison. They were invited to the Women's National Invitational Tournament, where they lost to Georgia Tech in the first round.

== Roster ==
2014–15 Elon Phoenix women's basketball team
Players
Coaches

Pos.	#	Name	Height	Year	Previous school	Hometown
G	1	Zora Stephenson	5 ft 10 in (1.78 m)	Sr	Oakton	Vienna, Virginia
G	2	Essence Baucom	5 ft 5 in (1.65 m)	RS So	Phillip O'Berry Academy; UAB	Charlotte, North Carolina
G	3	Lauren Brown	5 ft 9 in (1.75 m)	So	Alpharetta	Alpharetta, Georgia
G	4	Emily Sasser	5 ft 11 in (1.8 m)	Fr	Apex	Cary, North Carolina
G	5	Shay Burnett	5 ft 9 in (1.75 m)	Fr	Southern Alamance	Graham, North Carolina
G	10	Lauren Hudson	5 ft 9 in (1.75 m)	Jr	Wakefield	Raleigh, North Carolina
F	11	Jenifer Rhodes	6 ft 0 in (1.83 m)	So	Pinewood Prep	North Charleston, South Carolina
G	12	Lenaira Ruffin	5 ft 9 in (1.75 m)	So	River Mill	Burlington, North Carolina
G	13	Josepha Mbouma	5 ft 7 in (1.7 m)	Jr	Watkins Mill	Montgomery Village, Maryland
F	14	Mackenzie Darrah	6 ft 4 in (1.93 m)	RS Fr	Buford	Buford, Georgia
F	15	Nicole Razor	5 ft 6 in (1.68 m)	Jr	Southwest Dekalb	Stone Mountain, Georgia
C	21	Shannen Cochraham	6 ft 3 in (1.91 m)	Sr	Hayfield	Alexandria, Virginia
G	22	Jessica Farmer	6 ft 0 in (1.83 m)	Jr	Carolina Day	Asheville, North Carolina
G/F	24	Sam Coffer	6 ft 1 in (1.85 m)	Sr	Northern Guilford	Greensboro, North Carolina
F	32	Autumn Carter	6 ft 5 in (1.96 m)	Jr	Rockingham County	Reidsville, North Carolina
G	33	Maddie MaCallie (I)	5 ft 10 in (1.78 m)	Jr	Riverside; Miami (OH)	Durham, North Carolina
C	44	Malaya Johnson	6 ft 3 in (1.91 m)	Fr	North Surry	Mount Airy, North Carolina

Head coach

- Charlotte Smith

Assistant coach(es)

- Cristy McKinney
- Josh Wick
- Tasha Taylor

Legend

- (C) Team captain
- (S) Suspended
- (I) Ineligible
- (W) Walk-on
- Injured
- Current redshirt

Roster

== Schedule ==
Date time, TV	Rank^{#}	Opponent^{#}	Result	Record	Site (attendance) city, state
Exhibition
11/02/2014*; 6:00 pm		Catawba	W 92–49	–	Alumni Gym (N/A); Elon, North Carolina
Non-conference regular season
11/14/2014*; 5:00 pm		Anderson	W 77–72	1–0	Alumni Gym (374); Elon, North Carolina
11/16/2014*; 2:00 pm		Navy	W 69–56	2–0	Alumni Gym (453); Elon, North Carolina
11/21/2014*; 7:00 pm		at Charlotte	W 67–54	3–0	Dale F. Halton Arena (1,252); Charlotte, North Carolina
11/25/2014*; 7:00 pm		Liberty	W 73–62	4–0	Alumni Gym (561); Elon, North Carolina
11/30/2014*; 3:00 pm		at High Point	L 71–87	4–1	Millis Athletic Convocation Center (936); High Point, North Carolina
12/07/2014*; 2:00 pm		at NC State	L 51–84	4–2	Reynolds Coliseum (1,615); Raleigh, North Carolina
12/14/2014*; 2:00 pm		Vanderbilt	L 50–66	4–3	Alumni Gym (838); Elon, North Carolina
12/17/2014*; 3:00 pm		at Campbell	W 77–51	5–3	Gore Arena (322); Buies Creek, North Carolina
12/21/2014*; 3:00 pm		vs. No. 6 North Carolina; Carolinas Challenge	L 67–85	5–4	Myrtle Beach Convention Center (N/A); Myrtle Beach, South Carolina
12/29/2014*; 7:00 pm		Furman	W 81–71	6–4	Alumni Gym (412); Elon, North Carolina
12/31/2014*; 2:00 pm		Lenoir–Rhyne	W 62–46	7–4	Alumni Gym (353); Elon, North Carolina
CAA regular season
01/04/2015; 2:00 pm		at Delaware	W 60–50	8–4 (1–0)	Bob Carpenter Center (1,834); Newark, Delaware
01/06/2015; 7:00 pm		Drexel	L 47–57	8–5 (1–1)	Alumni Gym (346); Elon, North Carolina
01/09/2015; 7:00 pm		at William & Mary	W 72–59	9–5 (2–1)	Kaplan Arena (316); Williamsburg, Virginia
01/11/2015; 2:00 pm		College of Charleston	W 77–68	10–5 (3–1)	Alumni Gym (447); Elon, North Carolina
01/15/2015; 7:00 pm		James Madison	L 51–68	10–6 (3–2)	Alumni Gym (368); Elon, North Carolina
01/18/2015; 7:00 pm		Towson	W 58–43	11–6 (4–2)	Alumni Gym (383); Elon, North Carolina
01/22/2015; 7:00 pm		at UNC Wilmington	L 68–76	11–7 (4–3)	Trask Coliseum (563); Wilmington, North Carolina
01/25/2015; 3:00 pm, ASN		Northeastern	W 80–77 ^{OT}	12–7 (5–3)	Alumni Gym (404); Elon, North Carolina
01/30/2015; 7:00 pm		at James Madison	L 60–89	12–8 (5–4)	JMU Convention Center (2,673); Williamsburg, Virginia
02/05/2015; 7:00 pm		at Towson	W 84–70	13–8 (6–4)	SECU Arena (421); Towson, Maryland
02/08/2015; 2:00 pm		at College of Charleston	W 75–71	14–8 (7–4)	TD Arena (341); Charleston, South Carolina
02/12/2015; 7:00 pm		UNC Wilmington	L 82–86	14–9 (7–5)	Alumni Gym (482); Elon, North Carolina
02/15/2015; 1:00 pm		Hofstra	L 53–55	14–10 (7–6)	Alumni Gym (441); Elon, North Carolina
02/19/2015; 7:00 pm		at Northeastern	W 74–73	15–10 (8–6)	Cabot Center (277); Boston
02/22/2015; 2:00 pm		William & Mary	W 64–60	16–10 (9–6)	Alumni Gym (411); Elon, North Carolina
02/27/2015; 7:00 pm		at Drexel	L 51–54	16–11 (9–7)	Daskalakis Athletic Center (475); Philadelphia
03/01/2015; 1:00 pm		at Hofstra	W 64–58	17–11 (10–7)	Hofstra Arena (493); Hempstead, New York
03/04/2015; 7:00 pm		Delaware	W 77–76	18–11 (11–7)	Alumni Gym (506); Elon, North Carolina
CAA Women's Tournament
03/13/2015; 2:30 pm, ASN		vs. UNC Wilmington; Quarterfinals	W 60–48	19–11	Show Place Arena (N/A); Upper Marlboro, Maryland
03/14/2015; 1:00 pm, CSN		vs. James Madison; Semifinals	L 60–63	19–12	Show Place Arena (1,501); Upper Marlboro, Maryland
WNIT
03/19/2015*; 7:00 pm		at Georgia Tech; First Round	L 47–69	19–13	McCamish Pavilion (421); Atlanta
*Non-conference game. ^{#}Rankings from AP Poll. (#) Tournament seedings in parentheses. All times are in Eastern Time.

== See also ==
- 2014–15 Elon Phoenix men's basketball team
