= 2014–15 James Madison Dukes women's basketball team =

Intercollegiate basketball season

2014–15 James Madison Dukes women's basketball

CAA tournament & regular season champions

NCAA tournament, First Round
- Conference: Colonial Athletic Association
- Record: 29–4 (17–1 CAA)
- Head coach: Kenny Brooks (13th season)
- Assistant coaches: Sean O'Regan; Jennifer Brown; Sarah Williams
- Home arena: JMU Convocation Center

2014–15 CAA women's basketball standings
	Conf.				Overall
Team	W		L	PCT	W		L	PCT
James Madison†	17	–	1	.944	29	–	4	.879
Drexel	14	–	4	.778	20	–	11	.645
Hofstra	11	–	7	.611	20	–	13	.606
Elon	11	–	7	.611	19	–	13	.594
UNC Wilmington	10	–	8	.556	14	–	16	.467
William & Mary	9	–	9	.500	15	–	16	.484
Delaware	8	–	10	.444	15	–	17	.469
Towson	6	–	12	.333	11	–	21	.344
College of Charleston	3	–	15	.167	5	–	25	.167
Northeastern	1	–	17	.056	4	–	25	.138
† 2015 CAA tournament winner Rankings from AP poll

The 2014–15 James Madison Dukes women's basketball team represented James Madison University during the 2014–15 NCAA Division I women's basketball season. The Dukes, led by thirteenth-year head coach Kenny Brooks, played their home games at the James Madison University Convocation Center and were members of the Colonial Athletic Association (CAA). They finished the season 29–4, 17–1 in CAA play to win the CAA regular season title. They also won the CAA Tournament Championship and earned an automatic bid to the NCAA women's basketball tournament. They lost in the first round to Ohio State University.

== Roster ==
2014–15 James Madison Dukes women's basketball team
Players
Coaches

Pos.	#	Name	Height	Year	Previous school	Hometown
G	0	Candice Williams	5 ft 7 in (1.7 m)	Fr	St. Francis Day School	Atlanta
F	2	Destiny Jones	6 ft 0 in (1.83 m)	Jr	Archbishop McCarthy	Miramar, Florida
F	3	Toia Giggetts	6 ft 0 in (1.83 m)	Sr	Lake Taylor	Norfolk, Virginia
F	4	Tasia Butler (redshirt)	6 ft 1 in (1.85 m)	So	North Point; Syracuse	Waldorf, Maryland
G	5	Ashley Pérez (redshirt)	5 ft 8 in (1.73 m)	Jr	Manchester; St. John's	Manchester, Connecticut
G	12	Precious Hall	5 ft 8 in (1.73 m)	Jr	Maclay School	Tallahassee, Florida
G	14	Hailee Barron	5 ft 10 in (1.78 m)	Fr	Rice	Burlington, Vermont
G	24	Jazmon Gwathmey	6 ft 2 in (1.88 m)	RS Jr	Liberty	Bealeton, Virginia
G	32	Angela Mickens	5 ft 7 in (1.7 m)	Jr	Robert E. Lee	Staunton, Virginia
C	33	Lauren Okafor	6 ft 3 in (1.91 m)	RS Sr	Hopkins School; Providence	Hamden, Connecticut
C	40	Da'Lishia Griffin	6 ft 2 in (1.88 m)	So	Western Branch	Chesapeake, Virginia
F	42	Carley Brew	6 ft 0 in (1.83 m)	Fr	Wilson	Wyomissing, Pennsylvania

Head coach

Kenny Brooks

Assistant coach(es)

Sean O'Regan
Jennifer Brown
Sarah Williams

Legend

- (C) Team captain
- (S) Suspended
- (I) Ineligible
- (W) Walk-on
- Injured
- Current redshirt

Roster

== Schedule ==
Date time, TV	Rank^{#}	Opponent^{#}	Result	Record	Site (attendance) city, state
Exhibition
11/09/2014*; 2:00 pm		Lenoir–Rhyne	W 84–39	–	JMU Convocation Center (N/A); Harrisonburg, Virginia
Regular season
11/14/2014*; 1:00 pm		No. 23 UCLA	W 91–87 ^{OT}	1–0	JMU Convocation Center (2,831); Harrisonburg, Virginia
11/16/2014*; 2:00 pm		St. Bonaventure	W 76–43	2–0	JMU Convocation Center (2,042); Harrisonburg, Virginia
11/20/2014*; 7:00 pm		at American	W 69–65	3–0	Bender Arena (338); Washington, D.C.
11/23/2014*; 2:00 pm		Pittsburgh	W 80–64	4–0	JMU Convocation Center (2,157); Harrisonburg, Virginia
11/28/2014*; 2:30 pm		vs. No. 10 Maryland; San Juan Shootout	L 64–80	4–1	Mario Morales Coliseum (N/A); Guaynabo, PR
11/30/2014*; 5:00 pm		vs. Houston; San Juan Shootout	W 80–64	5–1	Mario Morales Coliseum (N/A); Guaynabo, PR
12/03/2014*; 7:00 pm		Richmond	W 79–68	6–1	JMU Convocation Center (2,258); Harrisonburg, Virginia
12/07/2014*; 2:00 pm		at Davidson	W 73–57	7–1	John M. Belk Arena (372); Davidson, North Carolina
12/15/2014*; 7:00 pm		at Ohio	W 69–62	8–1	Convocation Center (521); Athens, Ohio
12/20/2014*; 5:00 pm		Hampton	W 85–53	9–1	JMU Convocation Center (3,661); Harrisonburg, Virginia
12/29/2014*; 8:00 pm		at Vanderbilt	L 62–66	9–2	Memorial Gymnasium (2,965); Nashville, Tennessee
01/04/2015; 2:00 pm		Towson	W 67–66	10–2 (1–0)	JMU Convocation Center (2,419); Harrisonburg, Virginia
01/06/2015; 7:00 pm		UNC Wilmington	W 74–57	11–2 (2–0)	JMU Convocation Center (2,020); Harrisonburg, Virginia
01/09/2015; 7:00 pm		at Northeastern	W 77–55	12–2 (3–0)	Cabot Center (213); Boston
01/11/2015; 2:00 pm		at William & Mary	W 65–43	13–2 (4–0)	Kaplan Arena (558); Williamsburg, Virginia
01/15/2015; 7:00 pm		at Elon	W 68–51	14–2 (5–0)	Alumni Gym (364); Elon, North Carolina
01/18/2015; 2:00 pm		Drexel	W 66–51	15–2 (6–0)	JMU Convocation Center (5,009); Harrisonburg, Virginia
01/22/2015; 7:00 pm		William & Mary	W 92–50	16–2 (7–0)	JMU Convocation Center (2,697); Harrisonburg, Virginia
01/25/2015; 2:00 pm		at College of Charleston	W 73–53	17–2 (8–0)	TD Arena (538); Charleston, South Carolina
01/30/2015; 7:00 pm		Elon	W 89–60	18–2 (9–0)	JMU Convocation Center (2,673); Harrisonburg, Virginia
02/06/2015; 2:00 pm		at Hofstra	W 77–68	19–2 (10–0)	Hofstra Arena (420); Hempstead, New York
02/08/2015; 2:00 pm		at Drexel	W 73–54	20–2 (11–0)	Daskalakis Athletic Center (1,174); Philadelphia
02/12/2015; 12:00 pm		at Towson	W 79–64	21–2 (12–0)	SECU Arena (701); Towson, Maryland
02/15/2015; 1:00 pm, ASN		Delaware	W 94–64	22–2 (13–0)	JMU Convocation Center (4,301); Harrisonburg, Virginia
02/19/2015; 7:00 pm	No. 23	at UNC Wilmington	W 85–49	23–2 (14–0)	Trask Coliseum (587); Wilmington, North Carolina
02/22/2015; 3:00 pm	No. 23	Hofstra	L 62–63	23–3 (14–1)	JMU Convocation Center (3,652); Harrisonburg, Virginia
02/27/2015; 7:00 pm		Northeastern	W 82–47	24–3 (15–1)	JMU Convocation Center (2,482); Harrisonburg, Virginia
03/01/2015; 2:00 pm		at Delaware	W 74–71	25–3 (16–1)	Bob Carpenter Center (2,124); Newark, Delaware
03/04/2015; 7:00 pm		College of Charleston	W 107–58	26–3 (17–1)	JMU Convocation Center (2,456); Harrisonburg, Virginia
2015 CAA Tournament
03/13/2015; 12:00 pm, ASN		vs. Towson; Quarterfinals	W 64–49	27–3	Show Place Arena (N/A); Upper Marlboro, Maryland
03/14/2015; 1:00 pm, CSN		vs. Elon; Semifinals	W 63–60	28–3	Show Place Arena (1,501); Upper Marlboro, Maryland
03/15/2015; 1:00 pm, CSN		vs. Hofstra; Championship Game	W 62–56	29–3	Show Place Arena (1,491); Upper Marlboro, Maryland
NCAA Women's Tournament
03/21/2015*; 1:30 pm, ESPN2		vs. No. 23 Ohio State; First Round	L 80–90	29–4	Carmichael Arena (2,233); Chapel Hill, North Carolina
*Non-conference game. ^{#}Rankings from AP Poll. (#) Tournament seedings in parentheses. All times are in Eastern Time.

== Rankings ==
Regular season polls
Poll	Pre- season	Week 2	Week 3	Week 4	Week 5	Week 6	Week 7	Week 8	Week 9	Week 10	Week 11	Week 12	Week 13	Week 14	Week 15	Week 16	Week 17	Week 18	Final
AP	RV	RV	RV	RV	RV	RV	RV	RV	NR	NR	NR	NR	RV	RV	23	RV	RV	RV	RV
Coaches	RV	23	RV	RV	RV	24	RV	RV	RV	RV	RV	RV	RV	RV	21	RV	RV	RV	RV

Legend
	Increase in ranking
	Decrease in ranking
	No change
(RV)	Received votes
(NR)	Not ranked

== See also ==
- 2014–15 James Madison Dukes men's basketball team
