= 2014–15 Towson Tigers women's basketball team =

Intercollegiate basketball season

2014–15 Towson Tigers women's basketball
- Conference: Colonial Athletic Association
- Record: 11–21 (6–12 CAA)
- Head coach: Niki Reid Geckeler (2nd season)
- Assistant coaches: Brian Johnson; James Simmons; Christie Rogers
- Home arena: SECU Arena

2014–15 CAA women's basketball standings
	Conf.				Overall
Team	W		L	PCT	W		L	PCT
James Madison†	17	–	1	.944	29	–	4	.879
Drexel	14	–	4	.778	20	–	11	.645
Hofstra	11	–	7	.611	20	–	13	.606
Elon	11	–	7	.611	19	–	13	.594
UNC Wilmington	10	–	8	.556	14	–	16	.467
William & Mary	9	–	9	.500	15	–	16	.484
Delaware	8	–	10	.444	15	–	17	.469
Towson	6	–	12	.333	11	–	21	.344
College of Charleston	3	–	15	.167	5	–	25	.167
Northeastern	1	–	17	.056	4	–	25	.138
† 2015 CAA tournament winner Rankings from AP poll

The 2014–15 Towson Tigers women's basketball team represented Towson University during the 2014–15 NCAA Division I women's basketball season. The Tigers, led by second year head coach Niki Reid Geckeler, played their home games at SECU Arena and were members of the Colonial Athletic Association. They finished the season 11–21, 6–12 in CAA play to finish in eighth place. They advanced to the quarterfinals of the CAA women's tournament, where they lost to James Madison.

== Roster ==
2014–15 Towson Tigers women's basketball team
Players
Coaches

Pos.	#	Name	Height	Year	Previous school	Hometown
F	0	LaTorri Hines-Allen	6 ft 2 in (1.88 m)	RS Sr	Montclair H.S. Virginia Tech	Montclair, New Jersey
G	1	Dominique Johnson	5 ft 6 in (1.68 m)	Jr	Riverdale Baptist H.S.	Laurel, Maryland
G	2	Breonn Hughey	5 ft 5 in (1.65 m)	Fr	Capital Christian Academy	Washington, D.C.
G	3	Ciara Webb	5 ft 9 in (1.75 m)	Sr	Patterson H.S.	Baltimore
G	4	Braysia Hicks	5 ft 10 in (1.78 m)	Fr	Hampton Roads Academy	Yorktown, Virginia
F	5	Jordyn Smith	6 ft 0 in (1.83 m)	RS Fr	Hillside H.S.	Durham, North Carolina
G	10	Alexandra Silva	5 ft 3 in (1.6 m)	Sr	South Hagerstown H.S.	Hagerstown, Maryland
C	11	Nicole Hamilton-Carter	6 ft 4 in (1.93 m)	Sr	Fryshusets Gymnasium	Stockholm, Sweden
G	12	Markeema Crawford	5 ft 7 in (1.7 m)	Fr	Edgewater H.S.	Orlando, Florida
F	13	Camille Alberson	6 ft 2 in (1.88 m)	Sr	Arlington H.S.	Arlington, Tennessee
F	14	Brianna Bush	6 ft 1 in (1.85 m)	So	Elizabeth Seton H.S.	District Heights, Maryland
G	20	Markell Smith	6 ft 1 in (1.85 m)	Sr	Norfolk Collegiate School	Chesapeake, Virginia
G	23	Ece Yurdakul	5 ft 7 in (1.7 m)	Fr	Freedom Christian Academy	Istanbul, Turkey
G	32	Shanea Butler	6 ft 0 in (1.83 m)	Fr	Westlake H.S.	Waldorf, Maryland
C	33	Daijha Thomas	6 ft 3 in (1.91 m)	Fr	Calvert H.S.	St. Leonard, Maryland
G		Brianna Taylor (I)	5 ft 4 in (1.63 m)	Sr	Oakland Mills H.S. Nyack College	Columbia, Maryland

Head coach

Niki Reid Geckeler

Assistant coach(es)

Brian Johnson
James Simmons
Christie Rogers

Legend

- (C) Team captain
- (S) Suspended
- (I) Ineligible
- (W) Walk-on
- Injured
- Current redshirt

Roster

== Schedule ==
Date time, TV	Rank^{#}	Opponent^{#}	Result	Record	Site (attendance) city, state
Exhibition
11/07/2014*; 6:00 pm		Stevenson	W 66–57	–	SECU Arena (N/A); Towson, Maryland
Regular season
11/14/2014*; 12:00 pm		at Penn State; Preseason WNIT First Round	L 64–71	0–1	Bryce Jordan Center (3,123); University Park, Pennsylvania
11/21/2014*; 6:30 pm		Rider; Preseason WNIT Consolation Round	W 53–51	1–1	SECU Arena (315); Towson, Maryland
11/22/2014*; 6:30 pm		North Dakota; Preseason WNIT Consolation Round	L 52–54	1–2	SECU Arena (290); Towson, Maryland
11/25/2014*; 5:00 pm		at UMBC	W 59–54	2–2	Retriever Activities Center (345); Catonsville, Maryland
11/28/2014*; 4:30 pm		vs. Rhode Island; LIU Tournament	L 49–60	2–3	Steinberg Wellness Center (345); Brooklyn, New York
11/29/2014*; 4:30 pm		vs. La Salle; LIU Tournament	L 49–62	2–4	Steinberg Wellness Center (345); Brooklyn, New York
12/02/2014*; 7:00 pm		at Navy	L 51–55	2–5	Alumni Hall (308); Annapolis, Maryland
12/04/2014*; 7:00 pm		at Loyola (MD)	W 63–50	3–5	Reitz Arena (274); Baltimore
12/07/2014*; 2:00 pm		at No. 15 Maryland	L 52–81	3–6	Xfinity Center (3,887); College Park, Maryland
12/18/2014*; 11:30 am		at Wake Forest	L 64–74	3–7	LJVM Coliseum (4,845); Winston-Salem, North Carolina
12/28/2014*; 2:00 pm		George Mason	W 72–70	4–7	SECU Arena (515); Towson, Maryland
12/31/2014*; 1:00 pm		George Washington	L 48–82	4–8	SECU Arena (445); Towson, Maryland
01/04/2015; 2:00 pm		at James Madison	L 66–67	4–9 (0–1)	JMU Convocation Center (2,419); Harrisonburg, Virginia
01/06/2015; 7:00 pm		William & Mary	W 77–69 ^{OT}	5–9 (1–1)	SECU Arena (554); Towson, Maryland
01/09/2015; 7:00 pm		Delaware	W 56–49	6–9 (2–1)	SECU Arena (451); Towson, Maryland
01/11/2015; 2:00 pm		Hofstra	L 42–58	6–10 (2–2)	SECU Arena (555); Towson, Maryland
01/16/2015; 7:00 pm		at College of Charleston	W 56–52	7–10 (3–2)	TD Arena (289); Charleston, South Carolina
01/18/2015; 2:00 pm		at Elon	L 43–58	7–11 (3–3)	Alumni Gym (383); Elon, North Carolina
01/22/2015; 7:00 pm		Northeastern	W 65–61	8–11 (4–3)	SECU Arena (401); Towson, Maryland
01/25/2015; 2:00 pm		at UNC Wilmington	L 63–71	8–12 (4–4)	Trask Coliseum (521); Wilmington, North Carolina
01/29/2015; 7:00 pm		at Delaware	L 54–72	8–13 (4–5)	Bob Carpenter Center (1,601); Newark, Delaware
02/01/2015; 1:00 pm		College of Charleston	W 71–49	9–13 (5–5)	SECU Arena (433); Towson, Maryland
02/05/2015; 7:00 pm		Elon	L 70–84	9–14 (5–6)	SECU Arena (421); Towson, Maryland
02/08/2015; 2:00 pm		at Northeastern	W 72–64	10–14 (6–6)	Cabot Center (417); Boston
02/12/2015; 12:00 pm		James Madison	L 64–79	10–15 (6–7)	SECU Arena (701); Towson, Maryland
02/15/2015; 2:00 pm		Drexel	L 52–66	10–16 (6–8)	SECU Arena (357); Towson, Maryland
02/19/2015; 7:00 pm		at Hofstra	L 48–62	10–17 (6–9)	Hofstra Arena (228); Hempstead, New York
02/22/2015; 2:00 pm		UNC Wilmington	L 71–73 ^{OT}	10–18 (6–10)	SECU Arena (481); Towson, Maryland
03/01/2015; 3:00 pm, ASN		at Drexel	L 45–50	10–19 (6–11)	Daskalakis Athletic Center (642); Philadelphia
03/04/2015; 7:00 pm		at William & Mary	L 56–68	10–20 (6–12)	Kaplan Arena (546); Williamsburg, Virginia
CAA Tournament
03/12/2015; 12:00 pm		vs. College of Charleston; First Round	W 79–70	11–20	Show Place Arena (N/A); Upper Marlboro, Maryland
03/13/2015; 12:00 pm, ASN		vs. James Madison; Quarterfinals	L 49–64	11–21	Show Place Arena (N/A); Upper Marlboro, Maryland
*Non-conference game. ^{#}Rankings from AP Poll. (#) Tournament seedings in parentheses. All times are in Eastern Time.
