= 2014–15 Drexel Dragons women's basketball team =

American college basketball season

2014–15 Drexel Dragons women's basketball

WNIT, First Round
- Conference: Colonial Athletic Association
- Record: 20–11 (14–4 CAA)
- Head coach: Denise Dillon (12th season)
- Assistant coaches: Amy Mallon; Stacy McCullough; Michelle Baker
- Home arena: Daskalakis Athletic Center

2014–15 CAA women's basketball standings
	Conf.				Overall
Team	W		L	PCT	W		L	PCT
James Madison†	17	–	1	.944	29	–	4	.879
Drexel	14	–	4	.778	20	–	11	.645
Hofstra	11	–	7	.611	20	–	13	.606
Elon	11	–	7	.611	19	–	13	.594
UNC Wilmington	10	–	8	.556	14	–	16	.467
William & Mary	9	–	9	.500	15	–	16	.484
Delaware	8	–	10	.444	15	–	17	.469
Towson	6	–	12	.333	11	–	21	.344
College of Charleston	3	–	15	.167	5	–	25	.167
Northeastern	1	–	17	.056	4	–	25	.138
† 2015 CAA tournament winner Rankings from AP poll

The 2014–15 Drexel Dragons women's basketball team represented Drexel University during the 2014–15 NCAA Division I women's basketball season. The Dragons, led by twelfth year head coach Denise Dillon, played their home games at the Daskalakis Athletic Center and were members of the Colonial Athletic Association. They finished the season 20–11, 14–4 in CAA play to finish in second place. They lost in the quarterfinals of the CAA women's tournament to Delaware. They were invited to the Women's National Invitational Tournament, where they lost to Hampton in the first round.

== Roster ==
2014–15 Drexel Dragons women's basketball team
Players
Coaches

Pos.	#	Name	Height	Year	Previous school	Hometown
G	3	Ashida Cooper	5 ft 5 in (1.65 m)	So	Bensalem	Bensalem, Pennsylvania
G	11	Florence Ouattara	5 ft 10 in (1.78 m)	RS Fr	Life Center Academy	Tiassalé, Ivory Coast
G/F	14	Sara Woods	5 ft 10 in (1.78 m)	Fr	Good Counsel	Olney, Maryland
G	15	Carrie Alexander	5 ft 7 in (1.7 m)	Jr	Bishop McNamara	Bowie, Maryland
G	20	Jessie Pellechio	5 ft 6 in (1.68 m)	Jr	North Hunterdon	Lebanon, New Jersey
G	21	Megan Marecic	5 ft 11 in (1.8 m)	Fr	Bethel Park	Bethel Park, Pennsylvania
G	22	Meghan Creighton	5 ft 7 in (1.7 m)	Jr	Archbishop Carroll	West Chester, Pennsylvania
G	23	Alexis Smith	5 ft 6 in (1.68 m)	So	Calvert	Lusby, Maryland
G	24	Rachel Pearson	5 ft 11 in (1.8 m)	Jr	Archbishop Carroll	West Chester, Pennsylvania
F	25	Kelsi Lidge	5 ft 8 in (1.73 m)	Fr	Regis Jesuit	Aurora, Colorado
F	33	Sarah Curran	5 ft 11 in (1.8 m)	So	Archbishop Carroll	Media, Pennsylvania
F	41	Jamila Thompson	6 ft 4 in (1.93 m)	Sr	Barking Abbey	London, England
F	42	Jackie Schluth	6 ft 1 in (1.85 m)	Sr	Bishop Eustace	Medford, New Jersey
F	53	April Henson	5 ft 9 in (1.75 m)	Fr	South County	Lorton, Virginia

Head coach

Denise Dillon

Assistant coach(es)

Amy Mallon
Stacy McCullough
Michelle Baker

Legend

- (C) Team captain
- (S) Suspended
- (I) Ineligible
- (W) Walk-on
- Injured
- Current redshirt

Roster

== Schedule ==
Date time, TV	Rank^{#}	Opponent^{#}	Result	Record	Site (attendance) city, state
Regular Season
11/16/2014*; 2:00 pm		Cornell	W 62–53	1–0	Daskalakis Athletic Center (757); Philadelphia
11/19/2014*; 7:00 pm		at Princeton	L 43–59	1–1	Jadwin Gymnasium (568); Princeton, New Jersey
11/22/2014*; 2:00 pm		Colgate	W 59–51	2–1	Daskalakis Athletic Center (552); Philadelphia, Pennsylvania
11/25/2014*; 7:00 pm		Saint Joseph's	W 76–63	3–1	Daskalakis Athletic Center (607); Philadelphia, Pennsylvania
12/06/2014*; 2:00 pm		vs. St. Bonaventure; Brown Classic semifinals	L 32–43	3–2	Pizzitola Sports Center (174); Providence, Rhode Island
12/07/2014*; 2:00 pm		vs. Sacred Heart; Brown Classic 3rd place game	W 61–54	4–2	Pizzitola Sports Center (153); Providence, Rhode Island
12/14/2014*; 2:00 pm		at Pittsburgh	L 53–72	4–3	Peterson Events Center (798); Pittsburgh
12/17/2014*; 7:00 pm		at Quinnipiac	L 50–74	4–4	TD Bank Sports Center (292); Hamden, Connecticut
12/20/2014*; 2:00 pm		Penn; Battle of 33rd Street	W 67–58	5–4	Daskalakis Athletic Center (714); Philadelphia
12/28/2014*; 12:00 pm		vs. Miami (OH); Holiday Inn University Area Cavalier Classic	W 71–54	6–4	John Paul Jones Arena (N/A); Charlottesville, Virginia
12/29/2014*; 7:00 pm		at Virginia; Holiday Inn University Area Cavalier Classic	L 66–72	6–5	John Paul Jones Arena (3,031); Charlottesville, Virginia
01/04/2015; 2:00 pm		Northeastern	W 58–35	7–5 (1–0)	Daskalakis Athletic Center (602); Philadelphia
01/06/2015; 7:00 pm		at Elon	W 57–47	8–5 (2–0)	Alumni Gym (346); Elon, North Carolina
01/09/2015; 7:00 pm		Hofstra	L 52–53 ^{OT}	8–6 (2–1)	Daskalakis Athletic Center (676); Philadelphia
01/11/2015; 2:00 pm		UNC Wilmington	W 58–53	9–6 (3–1)	Daskalakis Athletic Center (596); Philadelphia
01/15/2015; 7:00 pm		at William & Mary	W 49–46	10–6 (4–1)	Kaplan Arena (232); Williamsburg, Virginia
01/18/2015; 2:00 pm		at James Madison	L 51–66	10–7 (4–2)	JMU Convocation Center (5,009); Harrisonburg, Virginia
01/22/2015; 12:00 pm		at Hofstra	W 63–56	11–7 (5–2)	Hofstra Arena (1,864); Hempstead, New York
01/25/2015; 2:00 pm		Delaware	W 61–56	12–7 (6–2)	Daskalakis Athletic Center (1,056); Philadelphia
01/30/2015; 7:00 pm		College of Charleston	W 64–47	13–7 (7–2)	Daskalakis Athletic Center (507); Philadelphia
02/01/2015; 1:00 pm		at UNC Wilmington	W 61–44	14–7 (8–2)	Trask Coliseum (689); Wilmington, North Carolina
02/06/2015; 7:00 pm		William & Mary	L 68–72 ^{2OT}	14–8 (8–3)	Daskalakis Athletic Center (562); Philadelphia
02/08/2015; 2:00 pm		James Madison	L 54–73	14–9 (8–4)	Daskalakis Athletic Center (1,174); Philadelphia
02/15/2015; 2:00 pm		at Towson	W 66–52	15–9 (9–4)	SECU Arena (357); Towson, Maryland
02/19/2015; 7:00 pm		at College of Charleston	W 63–52	16–9 (10–4)	TD Arena (218); Charleston, South Carolina
02/22/2015; 2:00 pm		at Delaware	W 67–64	17–9 (11–4)	Bob Carpenter Center (2,063); Newark, Delaware
02/27/2015; 7:00 pm		Elon	W 54–51	18–9 (12–4)	Daskalakis Athletic Center (475); Philadelphia
03/01/2015; 3:00 pm, ASN		Towson	W 50–45	19–9 (13–4)	Daskalakis Athletic Center (642); Philadelphia
03/04/2015; 7:00 pm		at Northeastern	W 58–42	20–9 (14–4)	Cabot Center (507); Boston
CAA tournament
03/13/2015; 5:00 pm, ASN		vs. Delaware; Quarterfinals	L 48–55	20–10	Show Place Arena (N/A); Upper Marlboro, Maryland
WNIT Tournament
03/19/2015*; 7:00 pm		Hampton; First Round	L 42–45	20–11	Daskalakis Athletic Center (415); Philadelphia
*Non-conference game. ^{#}Rankings from AP Poll. (#) Tournament seedings in parentheses. All times are in Eastern Time.

== See also ==
- 2014–15 Drexel Dragons men's basketball team
