= 2014–15 Delaware Fightin' Blue Hens women's basketball team =

Intercollegiate basketball season

2014–15 Delaware Fightin' Blue Hens women's basketball
- Conference: Colonial Athletic Association
- Record: 15–17 (8–10 CAA)
- Head coach: Tina Martin (19th season)
- Assistant coaches: Jeanine Radice; Tom Lochner; Tiara Malcom
- Home arena: Bob Carpenter Center

2014–15 CAA women's basketball standings
	Conf.				Overall
Team	W		L	PCT	W		L	PCT
James Madison†	17	–	1	.944	29	–	4	.879
Drexel	14	–	4	.778	20	–	11	.645
Hofstra	11	–	7	.611	20	–	13	.606
Elon	11	–	7	.611	19	–	13	.594
UNC Wilmington	10	–	8	.556	14	–	16	.467
William & Mary	9	–	9	.500	15	–	16	.484
Delaware	8	–	10	.444	15	–	17	.469
Towson	6	–	12	.333	11	–	21	.344
College of Charleston	3	–	15	.167	5	–	25	.167
Northeastern	1	–	17	.056	4	–	25	.138
† 2015 CAA tournament winner Rankings from AP poll

The 2014–15 Delaware Fightin' Blue Hens women's basketball team represented the University of Delaware during the 2014–15 NCAA Division I women's basketball season. The Fightin' Blue Hens, led by nineteenth year head coach Tina Martin, played their home games at the Bob Carpenter Center and were members of the Colonial Athletic Association. They finished the season 15–17, 8–10 CAA play to finish in seventh place. They advanced to the semifinals of the CAA women's tournament, where they lost to Hofstra.

== Roster ==
2014–15 Delaware Fightin' Blue Hens women's basketball team
Players
Coaches

Pos.	#	Name	Height	Year	Previous school	Hometown
G	1	Chastity Taylor	5 ft 9 in (1.75 m)	Fr	St. Anthony's HS	Islandia, New York
G	2	Courtni Green	5 ft 7 in (1.7 m)	Jr	Millbrook HS	Winchester, Virginia
G	3	Erika Brown	5 ft 7 in (1.7 m)	So	John F. Kennedy HS	Haledon, New Jersey
G	4	Jodi Salyer	5 ft 10 in (1.78 m)	RS So	Staunton River HS	Roanoke, Virginia
F	5	Makeda Nicholas	6 ft 1 in (1.85 m)	Fr	North Babylon HS	North Babylon, New York
G	10	Brenna Williams	5 ft 8 in (1.73 m)	So	Ursuline Academy	Wilmington, Delaware
F	12	Hannah Jardine	6 ft 1 in (1.85 m)	So	O'Donel HS	St. John's, NL
F	13	Sadé Chatman (I)	6 ft 1 in (1.85 m)	So	Central HS / Clemson	St. Paul, Minnesota
F	14	Alecia Bell (injured) (C)	6 ft 0 in (1.83 m)	Jr	Woodside HS	Newport News, Virginia
G	21	Kiersten West	5 ft 9 in (1.75 m)	Fr	Longwood HS	Coram, New York
G	23	Jade Clark	6 ft 0 in (1.83 m)	Jr	St. John's College HS	Ashburn, Virginia
F	24	Joy Caracciolo	6 ft 1 in (1.85 m)	Sr	Stonewall Jackson HS / Boston College	Manassas, Virginia
C	33	Stephanie Leon (C)	6 ft 3 in (1.91 m)	Sr	Northport HS	Northport, New York
F	42	Alexis Sears	6 ft 2 in (1.88 m)	Fr	Lenape HS	Mount Laurel, New York

Head coach

- Tina Martin (Lock Haven)

Assistant coach(es)

- Jeanine Radice (Fordham)
- Tom Lochner (Temple)
- Tiara Malcom (Delaware)

Legend

- (C) Team captain
- (S) Suspended
- (I) Ineligible
- (W) Walk-on
- Injured
- Current redshirt

Roster
Last update: 28 February 2016

== Schedule ==
Date time, TV	Rank^{#}	Opponent^{#}	Result	Record	Site (attendance) city, state
Regular season
11/14/2014*; 7:00 pm		at Lafayette	L 52–63	0–1	Kirby Sports Center (547); Easton, Pennsylvania
11/16/2014*; 2:00 pm		Marist	W 70–60	1–1	Bob Carpenter Center (1,651); Newark, Delaware
11/21/2014*; 11:30 am		at East Carolina	L 60–89	1–2	Williams Arena at Minges Coliseum (4,935); Greenville, North Carolina
11/25/2014*; 7:00 pm		Fordham	L 44–49	1–3	Bob Carpenter Center (1,498); Newark, Delaware
11/29/2014*; 1:00 pm		at Vermont	W 68–46	2–3	Patrick Gym (546); Burlington, Vermont
12/02/2014*; 1:00 pm		at Temple	W 69–58	3–3	Liacouras Center (565); Philadelphia
12/07/2014*; 3:00 pm		Bucknell	W 58–56	4–3	Bob Carpenter Center (1,734); Newark, Delaware
12/16/2014*; 7:00 pm		Princeton	L 59–87	4–4	Bob Carpenter Center (1,697); Newark, Delaware
12/19/2014*; 7:00 pm		vs. Northern Kentucky	L 58–63	4–5	Fifth Third Arena (164); Cincinnati
12/20/2014*; 7:00 pm		at Cincinnati	L 59–67	4–6	Fifth Third Arena (404); Cincinnati, Ohio
12/29/2014*; 7:00 pm		Rider	W 68–53	5–6	Bob Carpenter Center (1,720); Newark, Delaware
01/04/2015; 2:00 pm		Elon	L 50–60	5–7 (0–1)	Bob Carpenter Center (1,834); Newark, Delaware
01/06/2015; 7:00 pm		at College of Charleston	L 49–55	5–8 (0–2)	TD Arena (188); Charleston, South Carolina
01/09/2015; 7:00 pm		at Towson	L 49–56	5–9 (0–3)	SECU Arena (451); Towson, Maryland
01/11/2015; 2:00 pm		at Northeastern	W 54–48	6–9 (1–3)	Cabot Center (450); Boston
01/15/2015; 7:00 pm		Hofstra	W 64–53	7–9 (2–3)	Bob Carpenter Center (1,803); Newark, Delaware
01/18/2015; 2:00 pm		William & Mary	L 48–50	7–10 (2–4)	Bob Carpenter Center (1,940); Newark, Delaware
01/22/2015; 7:00 pm		College of Charleston	W 80–49	8–10 (3–4)	Bob Carpenter Center (1,623); Newark, Delaware
01/25/2015; 2:00 pm		at Drexel	L 56–61	8–11 (3–5)	Daskalakis Athletic Center (1,056); Philadelphia
01/29/2015; 7:00 pm		Towson	W 72–54	9–11 (4–5)	Bob Carpenter Center (1,601); Newark, Delaware
02/01/2015; 2:00 pm		at Hofstra	W 73–62	10–11 (5–5)	Hofstra Arena (324); Hempstead, New York
02/05/2015; 7:00 pm		Northeastern	W 70–61	11–11 (6–5)	Bob Carpenter Center (1,623); Newark, Delaware
02/08/2015; 2:00 pm		UNC Wilmington	W 69–60	12–11 (7–5)	Bob Carpenter Center (2,231); Newark, Delaware
02/13/2015; 7:00 pm		at William & Mary	W 61–56	13–11 (8–5)	Kaplan Arena (465); Williamsburg, Virginia
02/15/2015; 1:00 pm, ASN		at James Madison	L 64–94	13–12 (8–6)	JMU Convocation Center (4,301); Harrisonburg, Virginia
02/22/2015; 2:00 pm		Drexel	L 64–67	13–13 (8–7)	Bob Carpenter Center (2,063); Newark, Delaware
02/26/2015; 7:00 pm		at UNC Wilmington	L 68–71	13–14 (8–8)	Trask Coliseum (413); Wilmington, North Carolina
03/01/2015; 2:00 pm		James Madison	L 71–74	13–15 (8–9)	Bob Carpenter Center (2,124); Newark, Delaware
03/04/2015; 7:00 pm		at Elon	L 76–77 ^{OT}	13–16 (8–10)	Alumni Gym (506); Elon, North Carolina
CAA Tournament
03/12/2015; 2:30 pm		vs. Northeastern; First Round	W 73–61	14–16	Show Place Arena (629); Upper Marlboro, Maryland
03/13/2015; 5:00 pm, ASN		vs. Drexel; Quarterfinals	W 55–48	15–16	Show Place Arena (N/A); Upper Marlboro, Maryland
03/14/2015; 3:30 pm, CSN		vs. Hofstra; Semifinals	L 42–45	15–17	Show Place Arena (1,501); Upper Marlboro, Maryland
*Non-conference game. ^{#}Rankings from AP Poll. (#) Tournament seedings in parentheses. All times are in Eastern Time.

== See also ==
- 2014–15 Delaware Fightin' Blue Hens men's basketball team
