= 2014–15 Hofstra Pride women's basketball team =

Intercollegiate basketball season

2014–15 Hofstra Pride women's basketball

WNIT, First Round
- Conference: Colonial Athletic Association
- Record: 20–13 (11–7 CAA)
- Head coach: Krista Kilburn-Steveskey (9th season)
- Assistant coaches: Faisal Khan; Denise King; Adia Revell
- Home arena: Hofstra Arena

2014–15 CAA women's basketball standings
	Conf.				Overall
Team	W		L	PCT	W		L	PCT
James Madison†	17	–	1	.944	29	–	4	.879
Drexel	14	–	4	.778	20	–	11	.645
Hofstra	11	–	7	.611	20	–	13	.606
Elon	11	–	7	.611	19	–	13	.594
UNC Wilmington	10	–	8	.556	14	–	16	.467
William & Mary	9	–	9	.500	15	–	16	.484
Delaware	8	–	10	.444	15	–	17	.469
Towson	6	–	12	.333	11	–	21	.344
College of Charleston	3	–	15	.167	5	–	25	.167
Northeastern	1	–	17	.056	4	–	25	.138
† 2015 CAA tournament winner Rankings from AP poll

The 2014–15 Hofstra Pride women's basketball team represented Hofstra University during the 2014–15 NCAA Division I women's basketball season. The Pride, led by ninth year head coach Krista Kilburn-Steveskey, played their home games at Hofstra Arena and were members of the Colonial Athletic Association. They finished the season 20–13, 11–7 in CAA play to finish in a tie for third place. They advanced to the championship game of the CAA women's tournament, where they lost to James Madison. They were invited to the Women's National Invitation Tournament, where they lost in the first round to Penn.

== Roster ==
2014–15 Hofstra Pride women's basketball team
Players
Coaches

Pos.	#	Name	Height	Year	Previous school	Hometown
G	0	Kelly Loftus	5 ft 10 in (1.78 m)	So	Mount Vernon	Alexandria, Virginia
G	1	Asia Jackson	5 ft 5 in (1.65 m)	Jr	Peekskill	Peekskill, New York
G	2	Ashunae Durant	5 ft 10 in (1.78 m)	Fr	Bloomfield Tech	Newark, New Jersey
G	3	Sydni Epps	5 ft 11 in (1.8 m)	Jr	Springside	Cheltenham, Pennsylvania
G	5	Stephania Oramas	5 ft 5 in (1.65 m)	Fr	Charles W. Flanagan	Pembroke Pines, Florida
F	10	Elo Edeferioka	6 ft 3 in (1.91 m)	So	Life Center Academy	Warri, Nigeria
G	11	Krystal Luciano	5 ft 5 in (1.65 m)	So	Colegio San Antonio	San Juan, Puerto Rico
G	12	Darius Faulk	5 ft 8 in (1.73 m)	Jr	Nazareth/West Virginia	Hempstead, New York
G	13	Aleana Leon	5 ft 7 in (1.7 m)	Fr	Colegio del Sagrado Corazon de Jesus	Ponce, Puerto Rico
G	20	Anjie White	6 ft 2 in (1.88 m)	RS So	Sanford School/George Washington	Newark, Delaware
G	21	Jakelle King-Gilchrist	5 ft 9 in (1.75 m)	Jr	Teaneck/Florida State	Teaneck, New Jersey
G	22	Olivia Askin	5 ft 8 in (1.73 m)	Fr	Shawnee	Medford, New Jersey
F	24	Dee Thomas-Palmer	6 ft 0 in (1.83 m)	Jr	William Penn Charter	Philadelphia
C	34	Maeva Dongmo	6 ft 4 in (1.93 m)	So	College Les Sapins/ASA College	Dschang, Cameroon

Head coach

Krista Kilburn-Steveskey

Assistant coach(es)

Faisal Khan
Denise King
Adia Revell

Legend

- (C) Team captain
- (S) Suspended
- (I) Ineligible
- (W) Walk-on
- Injured
- Current redshirt

Roster

== Schedule ==
Date time, TV	Rank^{#}	Opponent^{#}	Result	Record	Site (attendance) city, state
Regular Season
11/14/2014*; 6:00 pm		Central Connecticut	L 66–71 ^{OT}	0–1	Hofstra Arena (2,208); Hempstead, New York
11/18/2014*; 7:00 pm		Fairfield	W 66–53	1–1	Hofstra Arena (122); Hempstead, New York
11/21/2014*; 7:00 pm, SNY		at Fordham	L 46–60	1–2	Rose Hill Gymnasium (285); Bronx, New York
11/23/2014*; 4:00 pm		at Norfolk State	W 64–47	2–2	Joseph G. Echols Memorial Hall (376); Norfolk, Virginia
11/28/2014*; 4:00 pm		Northern Iowa; Hofstra Thanksgiving Tournament semifinals	W 61–58 ^{OT}	3–2	Hofstra Arena (258); Hempstead, New York
11/29/2014*; 4:00 pm		WKU; Hofstra Thanksgiving Tournament championship	L 65–70 ^{OT}	3–3	Hofstra Arena (204); Hempstead, New York
12/02/2014*; 7:00 pm		at Albany	W 65–55	4–3	SEFCU Arena (548); Albany, New York
12/06/2014*; 2:00 pm		Robert Morris	W 71–51	5–3	Hofstra Arena (142); Hempstead, New York
12/09/2014*; 5:30 pm		at NJIT	W 62–47	6–3	Fleisher Center (704); Newark, New Jersey
12/21/2014*; 12:00 pm		at Boston College	W 75–61	7–3	Conte Forum (531); Chestnut Hill, Massachusetts
12/30/2014*; 7:00 pm		at Virginia Tech	L 43–60	7–4	Cassell Coliseum (1,006); Blacksburg, Virginia
01/04/2015; 2:00 pm		College of Charleston	W 78–53	8–4 (1–0)	Hofstra Arena (147); Hempstead, New York
01/06/2015; 7:00 pm		Northeastern	W 85–83 ^{OT}	9–4 (2–0)	Hofstra Arena (130); Hempstead, New York
01/09/2015; 7:00 pm		at Drexel	W 53–52 ^{OT}	10–4 (3–0)	Daskalakis Athletic Center (676); Philadelphia
01/11/2015; 2:00 pm		at Towson	W 58–42	11–4 (4–0)	SECU Arena (555); Towson, Maryland
01/15/2015; 7:00 pm		at Delaware	L 53–64	11–5 (4–1)	Bob Carpenter Center (1,803); Newark, Delaware
01/18/2015; 1:00 pm		UNC Wilmington	W 71–57	12–5 (5–1)	Hofstra Arena (141); Hempstead, New York
01/22/2015; 12:00 pm		Drexel	L 56–63	12–6 (5–2)	Hofstra Arena (1,864); Hempstead, New York
01/25/2015; 2:00 pm		at William & Mary	L 56–57	12–7 (5–3)	Kaplan Arena (479); Williamsburg, Virginia
01/29/2015; 7:00 pm		at Northeastern	W 66–45	13–7 (6–3)	Cabot Center (350); Boston
02/01/2015; 7:00 pm		Delaware	L 62–73	13–8 (6–4)	Hofstra Arena (324); Hempstead, New York
02/06/2015; 2:00 pm		James Madison	L 68–77	13–9 (6–5)	Hofstra Arena (420); Hempstead, New York
02/08/2015; 1:00 pm, ASN		William & Mary	W 52–46	14–9 (7–5)	Hofstra Arena (765); Hempstead, New York
02/13/2015; 11:30 am		at College of Charleston	W 69–57	15–9 (8–5)	TD Arena (885); Charleston, South Carolina
02/15/2015; 1:00 pm		at Elon	W 55–53	16–9 (9–5)	Alumni Gym (441); Elon, North Carolina
02/19/2015; 7:00 pm		Towson	W 62–48	17–9 (10–5)	Hofstra Arena (228); Hempstead, New York
02/22/2015; 2:00 pm		at No. 23 James Madison	W 63–62	18–9 (11–5)	JMU Convocation Center (3,652); Harrisonburg, Virginia
03/01/2015; 1:00 pm		Elon	L 58–64	18–10 (11–6)	Hofstra Arena (493); Hempstead, New York
03/04/2015; 7:00 pm		at UNC Wilmington	L 75–76	18–11 (11–7)	Trask Coliseum (404); Wilmington, North Carolina
2015 CAA Tournament
03/13/2015; 7:30 pm, ASN		vs. William & Mary; Quarterfinals	W 64–51	19–11	Show Place Arena (1,854); Upper Marlboro, Maryland
03/14/2015; 3:30 pm, CSN		vs. Delaware; Semifinals	W 45–42	20–11	Show Place Arena (1,501); Upper Marlboro, Maryland
03/15/2015; 1:00 pm, CSN		vs. James Madison; Championship Game	L 56–62	20–12	Show Place Arena (1,491); Upper Marlboro, Maryland
WNIT
03/19/2015*; 7:00 pm		at Penn; First Round	L 58–65	20–13	Palestra (674); Philadelphia
*Non-conference game. ^{#}Rankings from AP Poll. (#) Tournament seedings in parentheses. All times are in Eastern Time.

== See also ==
- 2014–15 Hofstra Pride men's basketball team
