= 2014–15 Charleston Cougars women's basketball team =

Intercollegiate basketball season

2014–15 College of Charleston Cougars women's basketball
- Conference: Colonial Athletic Association
- Record: 5–25 (3–15 CAA)
- Head coach: Candice M. Jackson (1st season)
- Assistant coaches: Bob Clark; Adria Crawford; Darren Guensch
- Home arena: TD Arena

2014–15 CAA women's basketball standings
| | Conf. | | | | Overall |
| Team | W | | L | PCT | W | | L | PCT |
|---|---|---|---|---|---|---|---|---|
| James Madison† | 17 | – | 1 | .944 | 29 | – | 4 | .879 |
| Drexel | 14 | – | 4 | .778 | 20 | – | 11 | .645 |
| Hofstra | 11 | – | 7 | .611 | 20 | – | 13 | .606 |
| Elon | 11 | – | 7 | .611 | 19 | – | 13 | .594 |
| UNC Wilmington | 10 | – | 8 | .556 | 14 | – | 16 | .467 |
| William & Mary | 9 | – | 9 | .500 | 15 | – | 16 | .484 |
| Delaware | 8 | – | 10 | .444 | 15 | – | 17 | .469 |
| Towson | 6 | – | 12 | .333 | 11 | – | 21 | .344 |
| College of Charleston | 3 | – | 15 | .167 | 5 | – | 25 | .167 |
| Northeastern | 1 | – | 17 | .056 | 4 | – | 25 | .138 |
† 2015 CAA tournament winner Rankings from AP poll

The 2014–15 College of Charleston Cougars women's basketball team represented the College of Charleston during the 2014–15 NCAA Division I women's basketball season. The Cougars played their home games at the TD Arena and were in their second year as members of the Colonial Athletic Association. The Cougars were led by first-year head coach Candice M. Jackson. They finished the season 5–25, 3–15 in CAA play to finish in ninth place. They lost in the first round of the CAA women's tournament to Towson.

== Roster ==
2014–15 College of Charleston Cougars women's basketball team
Players
Coaches

| Pos. | # | Name | Height | Year | Previous school | Hometown |
|---|---|---|---|---|---|---|
| G | 1 | Nola Henry | 5 ft 7 in (1.7 m) | Jr | Willingboro HS | Willingboro, New Jersey |
| G | 2 | Erin Hall | 5 ft 8 in (1.73 m) | RS Sr | Wake Forest | Norcross, Georgia |
| G | 3 | Shiclasia Brown | 5 ft 5 in (1.65 m) | Fr | Nazareth Regional HS | Corona, New York |
| G/F | 5 | Jenice Winter | 5 ft 11 in (1.8 m) | So | South Shore HS | Brooklyn, New York |
| G | 10 | Breannah Davis-Bloom | 5 ft 5 in (1.65 m) | RS Sr | Norfolk State | Winston-Salem, North Carolina |
| F | 11 | Christy Hewatt | 5 ft 11 in (1.8 m) | Sr | Forsyth Central HS | Cumming, Georgia |
| F | 12 | Jacqueline Luna-Castro | 6 ft 2 in (1.88 m) | RS Jr | Boise HS; UC Santa Barbara | Boise, Idaho |
| F | 14 | Courtney Gardner | 5 ft 11 in (1.8 m) | So | Brookwood HS | Snellville, Georgia |
| G | 21 | Shannon Hines | 5 ft 7 in (1.7 m) | Jr | R-S Central HS | Spindale, North Carolina |
| G | 22 | Shanique Heard | 5 ft 6 in (1.68 m) | Fr | Riverdale HS | Murfreesboro, Tennessee |
| F | 24 | Breanna Bolden | 5 ft 11 in (1.8 m) | So | South River HS | Edgewater, Maryland |
| F/C | 30 | Mikaela Hopkins | 6 ft 5 in (1.96 m) | Sr | Thomas Sumter Academy | Augusta, Georgia |
| C | 52 | Zoe Wallis | 6 ft 5 in (1.96 m) | Fr | Parkway Central HS | Chesterfield, Missouri |

Head coach

Candice M. Jackson

Assistant coach(es)

Bob Clark
Adria Crawford
Darren Guensch

Legend

- (C) Team captain
- (S) Suspended
- (I) Ineligible
- (W) Walk-on
- Injured
- Current redshirt

Roster

== Schedule ==
| Date time, TV | Rank^{#} | Opponent^{#} | Result | Record | Site (attendance) city, state |
Exhibition
| 11/06/2014*; 7:00 pm | | USC Aiken | W 81–67 | – | TD Arena (N/A); Charleston, South Carolina |
Regular season
| 11/14/2014*; 7:00 pm, ESPN3 | | at Kennesaw State | L 61–68 | 0–1 | KSU Convocation Center (633); Kennesaw, Georgia |
| 11/16/2014*; 2:00 pm | | UNC Greensboro | L 68–70 | 0–2 | TD Arena (N/A); Charleston, South Carolina |
| 11/19/2014*; 7:00 pm | | at East Carolina | L 55–68 | 0–3 | Williams Arena (1,162); Greenville, North Carolina |
| 11/23/2014*; 2:00 pm | | at George Mason | L 61–71 | 0–4 | Patriot Center (550); Fairfax, Virginia |
| 11/28/2014*; 8:30 pm, SNY | | vs. No. 3 Connecticut; Gulf Coast Showcase Quarterfinals | L 24–85 | 0–5 | Germain Arena (3,987); Estero, Florida |
| 11/29/2014*; 2:30 pm | | vs. Minnesota; Gulf Coast Showcase consolation round | L 50–74 | 0–6 | Germain Arena (N/A); Estero, Florida |
| 11/30/2014*; 12:00 pm | | vs. Villanova; Gulf Coast Showcase 7th place game | L 41–60 | 0–7 | Germain Arena (N/A); Estero, Florida |
| 12/14/2014*; 2:00 pm | | at South Florida | L 47–67 | 0–8 | USF Sun Dome (1,296); Tampa, Florida |
| 12/21/2014*; 2:00 pm | | Mercer | W 72–59 | 1–8 | TD Arena (372); Charleston, South Carolina |
| 12/28/2014*; 7:00 pm | | at South Carolina State | L 51–60 | 1–9 | SHM Memorial Center (132); Orangeburg, South Carolina |
| 12/30/2014*; 7:00 pm | | USC Upstate | W 61–60 | 2–9 | TD Arena (381); Charleston, South Carolina |
| 01/04/2015; 2:00 pm | | at Hofstra | L 53–78 | 2–10 (0–1) | Hofstra Arena (147); Hempstead, New York |
| 01/06/2015; 7:00 pm | | Delaware | W 55–49 | 3–10 (1–1) | TD Arena (188); Charleston, South Carolina |
| 01/09/2015; 11:30 am | | at UNC Wilmington | L 57–69 | 3–11 (1–2) | Trask Coliseum (2,488); Wilmington, North Carolina |
| 01/11/2015; 2:00 pm | | at Elon | L 68–77 | 3–12 (1–3) | Alumni Gym (447); Elon, North Carolina |
| 01/16/2015; 7:00 pm | | Towson | L 52–56 | 3–13 (1–4) | TD Arena (289); Charleston, South Carolina |
| 01/18/2015; 2:00 pm | | Northeastern | W 59–38 | 4–13 (2–4) | TD Arena (437); Charleston, South Carolina |
| 01/22/2015; 7:00 pm | | at Delaware | L 49–80 | 4–14 (2–5) | Bob Carpenter Center (1,623); Newark, Delaware |
| 01/25/2015; 2:00 pm | | James Madison | L 58–75 | 4–15 (2–6) | TD Arena (538); Charleston, South Carolina |
| 01/30/2015; 7:00 pm | | at Drexel | L 47–64 | 4–16 (2–7) | Daskalakis Athletic Center (507); Philadelphia |
| 02/01/2015; 1:00 pm | | at Towson | L 49–71 | 4–17 (2–8) | SECU Arena (433); Towson, Maryland |
| 02/08/2015; 2:00 pm | | Elon | L 71–75 | 4–18 (2–9) | TD Arena (341); Charleston, South Carolina |
| 02/13/2015; 11:30 am | | Hofstra | L 57–69 | 4–19 (2–10) | TD Arena (885); Charleston, South Carolina |
| 02/15/2015; 2:00 pm | | at William & Mary | L 59–74 | 4–20 (2–11) | Kaplan Arena (465); Williamsburg, Virginia |
| 02/19/2015; 7:00 pm | | Drexel | L 52–63 | 4–21 (2–12) | TD Arena (218); Charleston, South Carolina |
| 02/22/2015; 2:00 pm | | at Northeastern | W 56–54 | 5–21 (3–12) | Cabot Center (313); Boston |
| 02/26/2015; 7:00 pm | | William & Mary | L 55–84 | 5–22 (3–13) | TD Arena (158); Charleston, South Carolina |
| 03/01/2015; 1:00 pm, ASN | | UNC Wilmington | L 65–76 | 5–23 (3–14) | TD Arena (232); Charleston, South Carolina |
| 03/04/2015; 7:00 pm | | at James Madison | L 58–107 | 5–24 (3–15) | JMU Convocation Center (2,456); Harrisonburg, Virginia |
2015 CAA Tournament
| 03/12/2015; 12:00 pm | | vs. Towson; First Round | L 70–79 | 5–25 | Show Place Arena (N/A); Upper Marlboro, Maryland |
*Non-conference game. ^{#}Rankings from AP Poll. (#) Tournament seedings in parentheses. All times are in Eastern Time.

== See also ==
- 2014–15 Charleston Cougars men's basketball team
