= 2014–15 William & Mary Tribe women's basketball team =

Intercollegiate basketball season

2014–15 William & Mary Tribe women's basketball

WBI, First Round
- Conference: Colonial Athletic Association
- Record: 15–16 (9–9 CAA)
- Head coach: Ed Swanson (2nd season)
- Assistant coaches: Jeanette Wedo; Millette Green; Kelly Killion
- Home arena: Kaplan Arena

2014–15 CAA women's basketball standings
| | Conf. | | | | Overall |
| Team | W | | L | PCT | W | | L | PCT |
|---|---|---|---|---|---|---|---|---|
| James Madison† | 17 | – | 1 | .944 | 29 | – | 4 | .879 |
| Drexel | 14 | – | 4 | .778 | 20 | – | 11 | .645 |
| Hofstra | 11 | – | 7 | .611 | 20 | – | 13 | .606 |
| Elon | 11 | – | 7 | .611 | 19 | – | 13 | .594 |
| UNC Wilmington | 10 | – | 8 | .556 | 14 | – | 16 | .467 |
| William & Mary | 9 | – | 9 | .500 | 15 | – | 16 | .484 |
| Delaware | 8 | – | 10 | .444 | 15 | – | 17 | .469 |
| Towson | 6 | – | 12 | .333 | 11 | – | 21 | .344 |
| College of Charleston | 3 | – | 15 | .167 | 5 | – | 25 | .167 |
| Northeastern | 1 | – | 17 | .056 | 4 | – | 25 | .138 |
† 2015 CAA tournament winner Rankings from AP poll

The 2014–15 William & Mary Tribe women's basketball team represented The College of William & Mary during the 2014–15 NCAA Division I women's basketball season. The Tribe, led by second year head coach Ed Swanson, played their home games at Kaplan Arena and were members of the Colonial Athletic Association. They finished the season 15–16, 9–9 in CAA play to finish in fifth place. They lost in the quarterfinals of the CAA women's tournament to Hofstra. They were invited to the Women's Basketball Invitational, where they lost in the first round to Xavier.

== Roster ==
2014–15 William & Mary Tribe women's basketball team
Players
Coaches

| Pos. | # | Name | Height | Year | Previous school | Hometown |
|---|---|---|---|---|---|---|
| G | 1 | Latrice Hunter | 5 ft 5 in (1.65 m) | So | Norfolk Christian | Norfolk, Virginia |
| G | 2 | Anna Kestler | 5 ft 5 in (1.65 m) | Sr | Mount Lebanon | Pittsburgh |
| F | 3 | Kasey Curtis | 6 ft 2 in (1.88 m) | So | Paul VI | Manassas, Virginia |
| G/F | 4 | Jeanne Gaumont | 6 ft 0 in (1.83 m) | Fr | Champlain College Saint-Lambert | Saint-Lambert, QE, Canada |
| G | 5 | Camila Prock | 5 ft 5 in (1.65 m) | Fr | McLean | Falls Church, Virginia |
| G | 10 | Alexis Hofstaedter | 5 ft 8 in (1.73 m) | So | Council Rock South | Richboro, Pennsylvania |
| F | 11 | Alexandra Masaquel | 5 ft 10 in (1.78 m) | So | ʻIolani School | Honolulu, HI |
| F | 12 | Jenna Green | 5 ft 7 in (1.7 m) | Fr | Centerville | Clifton, Virginia |
| G | 13 | Marlena Tremba | 5 ft 9 in (1.75 m) | So | Paul VI | Vienna, Virginia |
| G/F | 15 | Jazmen Boone | 5 ft 8 in (1.73 m) | Sr | Princess Anne | Virginia Beach, Virginia |
| G | 20 | Kyla Kerstetter | 5 ft 11 in (1.8 m) | Sr | Brentwood | Brentwood, Tennessee |
| F | 21 | Jenna Carroll | 6 ft 1 in (1.85 m) | Fr | Methacton | Norristown, Pennsylvania |
| C | 24 | Abby Rendle | 6 ft 4 in (1.93 m) | Fr | South Lakes | Reston, Virginia |
| G | 32 | Brooke Stewart | 6 ft 0 in (1.83 m) | Jr | Masconomet Regional | Topsfield, Massachusetts |
| F | 33 | Ashley DeLeonibus | 6 ft 2 in (1.88 m) | Fr | Bullis School | Potomac, Maryland |
| C | 44 | Mackenzie Morrison | 6 ft 4 in (1.93 m) | Sr | Martensdale-St. Mary's | Norwalk, Iowa |

Head coach

- Ed Swanson (Sacred Heart)

Assistant coach(es)

- Jeanette Wedo (San Diego)
- Millette Green (UMBC)
- Kelly Killion (Holy Family)

Legend

- (C) Team captain
- (S) Suspended
- (I) Ineligible
- (W) Walk-on
- Injured
- Current redshirt

Roster

== Schedule ==
| Date time, TV | Rank^{#} | Opponent^{#} | Result | Record | Site (attendance) city, state |
Regular season
| 11/14/2014*; 7:00 pm | | Loyola (MD) | W 72–71 | 1–0 | Kaplan Arena (566); Williamsburg, Virginia |
| 11/17/2014*; 7:00 pm | | at Old Dominion; Rivalry | L 58–66 | 1–1 | Ted Constant Convocation Center (1,994); Norfolk, Virginia |
| 11/21/2014*; 6:00 pm | | at North Carolina A&T | W 59–57 | 2–1 | Corbett Sports Center (276); Greensboro, North Carolina |
| 11/23/2014*; 2:00 pm | | at High Point | L 80–87 ^{OT} | 2–2 | Millis Athletic Convocation Center (727); High Point, North Carolina |
| 11/26/2014*; 7:00 pm | | VCU | W 56–48 | 3–2 | Kaplan Arena (286); Williamsburg, Virginia |
| 11/29/2014*; 2:00 pm | | Longwood | W 90–55 | 4–2 | Kaplan Arena (329); Williamsburg, Virginia |
| 12/02/2014*; 7:00 pm | | at Radford | W 81–71 | 5–2 | Dedmon Center (1,234); Radford, Virginia |
| 12/06/2014*; 1:00 pm | | at La Salle | L 71–78 | 5–3 | Tom Gola Arena (202); Philadelphia |
| 12/18/2014*; 6:00 pm | | at Wofford | W 71–51 | 6–3 | Benjamin Johnson Arena (102); Spartanburg, South Carolina |
| 12/21/2014*; 1:00 pm | | Maine | L 51–54 | 6–4 | Kaplan Arena (102); Williamsburg, Virginia |
| 12/28/2014*; 2:00 pm | | Richmond | L 56–59 | 6–5 | Kaplan Arena (541); Williamsburg, Virginia |
| 01/04/2015; 2:00 pm | | at UNC Wilmington | L 62–63 | 6–6 (0–1) | Trask Coliseum (421); Wilmington, North Carolina |
| 01/06/2015; 7:00 pm | | at Towson | L 69–77 ^{OT} | 6–7 (0–2) | SECU Arena (554); Towson, Maryland |
| 01/09/2015; 7:00 pm | | Elon | L 59–72 | 6–8 (0–3) | Kaplan Arena (316); Williamsburg, Virginia |
| 01/11/2015; 2:00 pm | | James Madison | L 43–65 | 6–9 (0–4) | Kaplan Arena (558); Williamsburg, Virginia |
| 01/15/2015; 7:00 pm | | Drexel | L 46–49 | 6–10 (0–5) | Kaplan Arena (232); Williamsburg, Virginia |
| 01/18/2015; 2:00 pm | | at Delaware | W 50–48 | 7–10 (1–5) | Bob Carpenter Center (1,940); Newark, Delaware |
| 01/22/2015; 2:00 pm | | at James Madison | L 50–92 | 7–11 (1–6) | JMU Convocation Center (2,697); Harrisonsburg, Virginia |
| 01/25/2015; 2:00 pm | | Hofstra | W 57–56 | 8–11 (2–6) | Kaplan Arena (479); Williamsburg, Virginia |
| 01/29/2015; 7:00 pm | | UNC Wilmington | W 67–62 | 9–11 (3–6) | Kaplan Arena (409); Williamsburg, Virginia |
| 02/01/2015; 2:00 pm | | at Northeastern | W 72–66 ^{2OT} | 10–11 (4–6) | Cabot Center (274); Boston |
| 02/06/2015; 7:00 pm | | at Drexel | W 72–68 ^{2OT} | 11–11 (5–6) | Daskalakis Athletic Center (562); Philadelphia |
| 02/08/2015; 1:00 pm, ASN | | at Hofstra | L 46–52 | 11–12 (5–7) | Hofstra Arena (765); Hempstead, New York |
| 02/13/2015; 2:00 pm | | Delaware | L 56–61 | 11–13 (5–8) | Kaplan Arena (465); Williamsburg, Virginia |
| 02/15/2015; 2:00 pm | | College of Charleston | W 74–59 | 12–13 (6–8) | Kaplan Arena (465); Williamsburg, Virginia |
| 02/22/2015; 2:00 pm | | at Elon | L 60–64 | 12–14 (6–9) | Alumni Gym (411); Elon, North Carolina |
| 02/26/2015; 7:00 pm | | at College of Charleston | W 84–55 | 13–14 (7–9) | TD Arena (158); Charleston, South Carolina |
| 03/01/2015; 2:00 pm | | Northeastern | W 62–47 | 14–14 (8–9) | Kaplan Arena (379); Williamsburg, Virginia |
| 03/04/2015; 7:00 pm | | Towson | W 68–56 | 15–14 (9–9) | Kaplan Arena (546); Williamsburg, Virginia |
2015 CAA Tournament
| 03/13/2015; 7:30 pm, ASN | | vs. Hofstra; Quarterfinals | L 51–64 | 15–15 | Show Place Arena (1,854); Upper Marlboro, Maryland |
Women's Basketball Invitational
| 03/19/2015*; 7:00 pm | | at Xavier; First Round | L 56–57 | 15–16 | Cintas Center (624); Cincinnati |
*Non-conference game. ^{#}Rankings from AP Poll. (#) Tournament seedings in parentheses. All times are in Eastern Time.

== See also ==
- 2014–15 William & Mary Tribe men's basketball team
