= 2014–15 Northeastern Huskies women's basketball team =

Intercollegiate basketball season

2014–15 Northeastern Huskies women's basketball
- Conference: Colonial Athletic Association
- Record: 4–25 (1–17 CAA)
- Head coach: Kelly Cole (1st season)
- Assistant coaches: Ganiyat Adeduntan; Jill Glessner; Chris Passmore
- Home arena: Cabot Center

2014–15 CAA women's basketball standings
	Conf.				Overall
Team	W		L	PCT	W		L	PCT
James Madison†	17	–	1	.944	29	–	4	.879
Drexel	14	–	4	.778	20	–	11	.645
Hofstra	11	–	7	.611	20	–	13	.606
Elon	11	–	7	.611	19	–	13	.594
UNC Wilmington	10	–	8	.556	14	–	16	.467
William & Mary	9	–	9	.500	15	–	16	.484
Delaware	8	–	10	.444	15	–	17	.469
Towson	6	–	12	.333	11	–	21	.344
College of Charleston	3	–	15	.167	5	–	25	.167
Northeastern	1	–	17	.056	4	–	25	.138
† 2015 CAA tournament winner Rankings from AP poll

The 2014–15 Northeastern Huskies women's basketball team represented the Northeastern University during the 2014–15 NCAA Division I women's basketball season. The Huskies, led by first year head coach Kelly Cole, played their home games at the Cabot Center and were members of the Colonial Athletic Association. They finished the season 4–25, 1–17 in CAA play to finish in last place. They lost in the first round of the CAA women's tournament to Delaware.

== Roster ==
2014–15 Northeastern Huskies women's basketball team
Players
Coaches

Pos.	#	Name	Height	Year	Previous school	Hometown
G	1	Amencie Mercier	5 ft 7 in (1.7 m)	Sr	Dawson College	Pierrefonds, QE
G	3	Loren Lassiter	5 ft 11 in (1.8 m)	Fr	Bishop O'Dowd HS	Castro Valley, California
G	4	A'lece Mark	5 ft 7 in (1.7 m)	Sr	Springfield Central HS; Loomis Chaffee Academy	Springfield, Massachusetts
G	10	Kazzidy Stewart	5 ft 9 in (1.75 m)	Jr	St. John's College	Lanham, Maryland
F	11	Sade Iriah	6 ft 0 in (1.83 m)	Jr	St. Edmund Campion Secondary School	Brampton, ON
G	13	Tiffany Montagne	5 ft 9 in (1.75 m)	Jr	Jackson Memorial HS	Jackson, New Jersey
F	14	Onia Webb	6 ft 2 in (1.88 m)	Jr	Cardinal Spellman HS	Bronx, New York
G	15	Claudia Oritz	5 ft 7 in (1.7 m)	Fr	XXXX	Carolina, PR
G/F	21	Tanisha Hopewell	5 ft 10 in (1.78 m)	Sr	Stone Ridge School of the Sacred Heart	Upper Marlboro, Maryland
G/F	23	Samantha DeFreese	5 ft 10 in (1.78 m)	Sr	Berkshire School	Bergenfield, New Jersey
G/F	25	DaChe Williams	6 ft 2 in (1.88 m)	So	Watkinson School	Bloomfield, Connecticut
C	30	Briana Schnare	6 ft 3 in (1.91 m)	Jr	Wachusetts Regional HS	Holden, Massachusetts
F	32	Maureen Taggart	5 ft 11 in (1.8 m)	Fr	Tilton School	Wallingford, Vermont
C	33	Francesca Salley	6 ft 2 in (1.88 m)	So	East HS	Denver, Colorado

Head coach

- Kelly Cole

Assistant coach(es)

- Ganiyat Adeduntan
- Jill Glessner
- Chris Passmore

Legend

- (C) Team captain
- (S) Suspended
- (I) Ineligible
- (W) Walk-on
- Injured
- Current redshirt

Roster

== Schedule ==
Date time, TV	Rank^{#}	Opponent^{#}	Result	Record	Site (attendance) city, state
Regular season
11/14/2014*; 12:00 pm		Boston University	W 75–74	1–0	Cabot Center (1,015); Boston
11/18/2014*; 7:00 pm		at No. 22 Rutgers	L 60–74	1–1	Louis Brown Athletic Center (1,213); Piscataway, New Jersey
11/22/2014*; 2:00 pm		Marist	W 58–51	2–1	Cabot Center (422); Boston
11/28/2014*; 2:30 pm		vs. North Dakota State; FAU Thanksgiving Tournament	L 72–79	2–2	FAU Arena (595); Boca Raton, Florida
11/29/2014*; 4:30 pm		at Florida Atlantic; FAU Thanksgiving Tournament	L 74–81	2–3	FAU Arena (N/A); Boca Raton, Florida
12/13/2014*; 1:00 pm		at Maine	L 51–60	2–4	Cross Insurance Center (1,320); Bangor, Maine
12/20/2014*; 4:00 pm		at Harvard	L 65–67	2–5	Lavietes Pavilion (512); Cambridge, Massachusetts
12/22/2014*; 2:00 pm		New Hampshire	L 62–63	2–6	Cabot Center (119); Boston
12/28/2014*; 2:00 pm		at Albany	W 70–67	3–6	SEFCU Arena (823); Albany, New York
12/31/2014*; 1:00 pm		at Boston College	L 56–66	3–7	Conte Forum (721); Chestnut Hill, Massachusetts
01/04/2015; 2:00 pm		at Drexel	L 35–58	3–8 (0–1)	Daskalakis Athletic Center (602); Philadelphia
01/06/2015; 7:00 pm		at Hofstra	L 83–85 ^{OT}	3–9 (0–2)	Hofstra Arena (130); Hempstead, New York
01/09/2015; 7:00 pm		James Madison	L 55–77	3–10 (0–3)	Cabot Center (213); Boston
01/11/2015; 2:00 pm		Delaware	L 48–54	3–11 (0–4)	Cabot Center (450); Boston
01/16/2015; 7:00 pm		UNC Wilmington	W 73–64	4–11 (1–4)	Cabot Center (330); Boston
01/18/2015; 2:00 pm		at College of Charleston	L 38–59	4–12 (1–5)	TD Arena (437); Charleston, South Carolina
01/22/2015; 7:00 pm		at Towson	L 61–65	4–13 (1–6)	SECU Arena (401); Towson, Maryland
01/25/2015; 3:00 pm, ASN		at Elon	L 77–80 ^{OT}	4–14 (1–7)	Alumni Gym (404); Elon, North Carolina
01/29/2015; 7:00 pm		Hofstra	L 45–66	4–15 (1–8)	Cabot Center (350); Boston
02/01/2015; 2:00 pm		William & Mary	L 66–72 ^{2OT}	4–16 (1–9)	Cabot Center (274); Boston
02/05/2015; 7:00 pm		at Delaware	L 61–70	4–17 (1–10)	Bob Carpenter Center (1,623); Newark, Delaware
02/08/2015; 2:00 pm		Towson	L 64–72	4–18 (1–11)	Cabot Center (417); Boston
02/15/2015; 2:00 pm		at UNC Wilmington	L 78–84	4–19 (1–12)	Trask Coliseum (702); Wilmington, North Carolina
02/19/2015; 7:00 pm		Elon	L 73–74	4–20 (1–13)	Cabot Center (277); Boston
02/22/2015; 2:00 pm		College of Charleston	L 54–56	4–21 (1–14)	Cabot Center (313); Boston
02/27/2015; 7:00 pm		at James Madison	L 47–82	4–22 (1–15)	JMU Convocation Center (2,482); Harrisonburg, Virginia
03/01/2015; 2:00 pm		at William & Mary	L 47–62	4–23 (1–16)	Kaplan Arena (379); Williamsburg, Virginia
03/04/2015; 7:00 pm		Drexel	L 42–58	4–24 (1–17)	Cabot Center (507); Boston
2015 CAA Tournament
03/12/2015; 2:30 pm		vs. Delaware; First Round	L 61–73	4–25	Show Place Arena (629); Upper Marlboro, Maryland
*Non-conference game. ^{#}Rankings from AP Poll. (#) Tournament seedings in parentheses. All times are in Eastern Time.

== See also ==
- 2014–15 Northeastern Huskies men's basketball team
