= 2015 CAA women's basketball tournament =

- Classification: Division I
- Season: 2014–15
- Teams: 10
- Site: Show Place Arena; Upper Marlboro, Maryland
- Champions: James Madison (8th title)
- Winning coach: Kenny Brooks (4th title)
- MVP: Jazmon Gwathmey (James Madison)
- Television: CSN, ASN, CAA.tv
- CAA women's basketball tournaments

2014–15 CAA women's basketball standings
	Conf.				Overall
Team	W		L	PCT	W		L	PCT
James Madison†	17	–	1	.944	29	–	4	.879
Drexel	14	–	4	.778	20	–	11	.645
Hofstra	11	–	7	.611	20	–	13	.606
Elon	11	–	7	.611	19	–	13	.594
UNC Wilmington	10	–	8	.556	14	–	16	.467
William & Mary	9	–	9	.500	15	–	16	.484
Delaware	8	–	10	.444	15	–	17	.469
Towson	6	–	12	.333	11	–	21	.344
College of Charleston	3	–	15	.167	5	–	25	.167
Northeastern	1	–	17	.056	4	–	25	.138
† 2015 CAA tournament winner Rankings from AP poll

The 2015 Colonial Athletic Association women's basketball tournament was held March 13–16, 2015 at the Show Place Arena in Upper Marlboro, Maryland. Champion James Madison received an automatic bid to the 2015 NCAA Tournament.

The 2015 tournament features ten teams with the addition of Elon.

== Seeds ==
Seed	School	Conference	Overall	Tiebreaker 1	Tiebreaker 2
1	James Madison ‡†	17–1	26–3		
2	Drexel †	14–4	20–9		
3	Hofstra †	11–7	18–11	1–1 vs. Elon	1–1 vs. JMU
4	Elon †	11–7	18–11	1–1 vs. Hofstra	0–2 vs. JMU
5	UNC Wilmington †	10–8	14–15		
6	William & Mary †	9–9	15–14		
7	Delaware	8–10	13–16		
8	Towson	6–12	10–20		
9	College of Charleston	3–15	5–24		
10	Northeastern	1–17	4–24		
‡ – CAA regular season champions. † – Received a bye in the conference tournament. Overall records are as of the end of the regular season.

== Schedule ==
Session	Game	Time*	Matchup^{#}	Television
First round – Thursday, March 12, 2015
1	1	12:00 pm	#9 College of Charleston vs. #8 Towson	CAA.tv
1	2	2:30 pm	#10 Northeastern vs. #7 Delaware	CAA.tv
Quarterfinals – Friday, March 13, 2015
2	3	12:00 pm	#8 Towson vs. #1 James Madison	ASN
2	4	2:30 pm	#5 UNC Wilmington vs #4 Elon	ASN
3	5	5:00 pm	#7 Delaware vs. #2 Drexel	ASN
3	6	7:30 pm	#6 William & Mary vs #3 Hofstra	ASN
Semifinals – Saturday, March 14, 2015
4	7	1:00 pm	#1 James Madison vs. #4 Elon	CSN
4	8	3:30 pm	#7 Delaware vs. #3 Hofstra	CSN
Championship – Sunday, March 15, 2014
5	9	1:00 pm	#1 James Madison vs. #3 Hofstra	CSN
*Game times in ET.

== Bracket ==
First round Thursday, March 12; CAA.tv
8	Towson	79
9	College of Charleston	70
7	Delaware	73
10	Northeastern	61

Quarterfinals; Friday, March 13; ASN
1	James Madison	64
8	Towson	49
4	Elon	60
5	UNC Wilmington	48
2	Drexel	48
7	Delaware	55
3	Hofstra	64
6	William & Mary	51

Semifinals; Saturday, March 14; CSN
1	James Madison	63
4	Elon	60
7	Delaware	42
3	Hofstra	45

Final; Sunday, March 15; CSN
1	James Madison	62
3	Hofstra	56

== See also ==
- 2015 CAA men's basketball tournament
