= 2014–15 Maryland Terrapins women's basketball team =

Intercollegiate basketball season

2014–15 Maryland Terrapins women's basketball
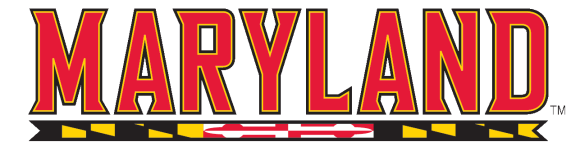

Big Ten Regular Season & Tournament Champions NCAA Women's Tournament Spokane Regional Champions

NCAA Women's Tournament #1 Spokane, final Four
- Conference: Big Ten Conference

Ranking
- Coaches: No. 3
- AP: No. 4
- Record: 34–3 (18–0 Big Ten)
- Head coach: Brenda Frese (13th season)
- Assistant coaches: Tina Langley; David Adkins; Marlin Chinn
- Home arena: Xfinity Center

2014–15 Big Ten women's basketball standings
	Conf.				Overall
Team	W		L	PCT	W		L	PCT
No. 4 Maryland†	18	–	0	1.000	34	–	3	.919
No. 18 Iowa	14	–	4	.778	26	–	8	.765
No. 23 Ohio State	13	–	5	.722	24	–	11	.686
No. 22 Northwestern	12	–	6	.667	23	–	9	.719
Rutgers	12	–	6	.667	23	–	10	.697
Minnesota	11	–	7	.611	23	–	10	.697
Nebraska	10	–	8	.556	21	–	11	.656
Michigan	8	–	10	.444	20	–	15	.571
Michigan State	7	–	11	.389	16	–	15	.516
Illinois	6	–	12	.333	15	–	16	.484
Wisconsin	5	–	13	.278	9	–	20	.310
Indiana	4	–	14	.222	15	–	16	.484
Purdue	3	–	15	.167	11	–	20	.355
Penn State	3	–	15	.167	6	–	24	.200
† 2015 Big Ten tournament winner As of April 5, 2015; Rankings from AP poll

The 2014–15 Maryland Terrapins women's basketball team represented the University of Maryland, College Park in 2014–15 NCAA Division I women's basketball season. They were led by thirteenth-year head coach Brenda Frese and played their home games at the Xfinity Center. They were first-year members of the Big Ten Conference after 38 seasons playing in the Atlantic Coast Conference. The 2014–15 Lady Terrapins won the 2014–15 Big Ten regular season Championship and the 2015 Big Ten Conference women's basketball tournament in their first year as a member of the Big Ten. They were the third women's basketball program in the Big Ten to go undefeated in the conference. The 1984–85 Ohio State Buckeyes and the 1998–99 Purdue Boilermakers were the only other women's programs in the Big Ten to accomplish that feat. They received an automatic bid to the NCAA women's basketball tournament, where they advanced to the final four, losing to the national champions Connecticut.

== Previous season ==
The Maryland Terrapins women's basketball finished the 2013–14 season with an overall record of 28–7, with a record of 12–4 in the ACC regular season, for a tie for a second-place finish. In the 2014 ACC tournament, the Terrapins lost in the quarterfinals to North Carolina. They were invited to the 2014 NCAA Division I women's basketball tournament, where they defeated Army, Texas, Tennessee and Louisville to make it to the final four, where they were defeated by Notre Dame.

== Off season ==
=== Departures ===
Name	Number	Pos.	Height	Year	Hometown	Reason for departure
Sequoia Austin	0	G	5'5"	Senior	Greenbelt, MD	Graduated
Alicia DeVaughn	13	C	6'4"	Senior	West Palm Beach, FL	Graduated
Essence Townsend	21	C	6'7"	RS senior	Paterson, NJ	Graduated
Alyssa Thomas	25	F	6'2"	Senior	Harrisburg, PA	Graduated/2014 WNBA draft
Katie Rutan	40	G	5'8"	Senior	Ambler, PA	Graduated

=== 2014 recruiting class ===
College recruiting
Name	Hometown	School	Height	Weight	Commit date
Kiara Leslie; G	Holly Springs, North Carolina	Holly Springs High School	5 ft 11 in (1.80 m)	N/A	
Kiara Leslie; G	Recruit ratings: (95)				
Kristen Confroy; G	Solon, Ohio	Solon High School	5 ft 8 in (1.73 m)	N/A	
Kristen Confroy; G	Recruit ratings: (90)				
Aja Ellison; F	Burlington, New Jersey	Life Center Academy	6 ft 3 in (1.91 m)	N/A	
Aja Ellison; F	Recruit ratings: (90)				
Overall recruit ranking:
Note: In many cases, Scout, Rivals, 247Sports, On3, and ESPN may conflict in their listings of height and weight.; In these cases, the average was taken. ESPN grades are on a 100-point scale.; Sources:

== Roster ==
2014–15 Maryland Terrapins women's basketball team
Players
Coaches

Pos.	#	Name	Height	Year	Previous school	Hometown
F	0	Aja Ellison	6 ft 3 in (1.91 m)	Fr	Life Center Academy	Burlington, OH
G	1	Laurin Mincy	6 ft 0 in (1.83 m)	RS Sr	University	Newark, NJ
G	2	Kiara Leslie	5 ft 11 in (1.8 m)	Fr	Solon	Holly Springs, NC
G	3	Brene Moseley	5 ft 7 in (1.7 m)	RS Jr	Paint Branch	Burtonsville, MD
G	4	Lexie Brown	5 ft 9 in (1.75 m)	So	North Gwinnett	Suwanee, GA
C	5	Malina Howard	6 ft 4 in (1.93 m)	Jr	Twinsburg	Twinsburg, OH
G	12	Kristen Confroy	5 ft 8 in (1.73 m)	Fr	Holly Springs	Solo, OH
G	15	Chloe Pavlech	5 ft 9 in (1.75 m)	Jr	Sycamore	Cincinnati, OH
F	22	Tierney Pfirman	6 ft 2 in (1.88 m)	Jr	South Williamsport Junior Senior	Williamsport, PA
F	32	Shatori Walker-Kimbrough	5 ft 11 in (1.8 m)	So	Hopewell	Aliquippa, PA
F	33	A'Lexus Harrison	6 ft 0 in (1.83 m)	RS Fr	Digital Harbor	Baltimore, MD
C	42	Brionna Jones	6 ft 3 in (1.91 m)	So	Aberdeen	Havre de Grace, MD

Head coach

Brenda Frese

Assistant coach(es)

Tina Langley
David Adkins
Marlin Chinn

Legend

- (C) Team captain
- (S) Suspended
- (I) Ineligible
- (W) Walk-on
- Injured
- Current redshirt

Roster
Last update: 2014-09-14

== Schedule ==
Date time, TV	Rank^{#}	Opponent^{#}	Result	Record	Site (attendance) city, state
Exhibition
11/01/2014*; 7:00 pm	No. 10	Goldey–Beacom	W 103–43	–	Xfinity Center (2,605); College Park, MD
11/08/2014*; 5:00 pm	No. 10	UDC	W 118–61	–	Xfinity Center (3,329); College Park, MD
Non-conference regular season
11/14/2014*; 11:00 am	No. 10	Mount St. Mary's	W 109–45	1–0	Xfinity Center (4,177); College Park, MD
11/16/2014*; 2:00 pm	No. 10	Wagner	W 97–24	2–0	Xfinity Center (3,353); College Park, MD
11/19/2014*; 7:00 pm	No. 9	South Florida	W 85–67	3–0	Xfinity Center (3,165); College Park, MD
11/22/2014*; 3:30 pm, CSN+	No. 9	at George Washington	W 75–65	4–0	Charles E. Smith Center (1,395); Washington, D.C.
11/24/2014*; 7:00 pm	No. 10	Loyola (MD)	W 65–43	5–0	Xfinity Center (2,194); College Park, MD
11/28/2014*; 3:30 pm	No. 10	vs. James Madison; San Juan Shootout	W 80–64	6–0	Mario Morales Coliseum (N/A); Guaynabo, PR
11/29/2014*; 3:30 pm	No. 10	vs. Washington State; San Juan Shootout	L 64–70	6–1	Mario Morales Coliseum (N/A); Guaynabo, PR
12/03/2014*; 7:00 pm, ESPN3	No. 15	vs. No. 2 Notre Dame; ACC–Big Ten Women's Challenge	L 72–92	6–2	Allen County War Memorial Coliseum (9,189); Fort Wayne, IN
12/07/2014*; 2:00 pm	No. 15	Towson	W 81–52	7–2	Xfinity Center (3,887); College Park, MD
12/12/2014*; 7:00 pm	No. 14	American	W 94–50	8–2	Xfinity Center (3,498); College Park, MD
12/21/2014*; 2:00 pm	No. 14	at Coppin State	W 110–51	9–2	Physical Education Complex (1,102); Baltimore, MD
Big Ten regular season
12/29/2014; 7:00 pm, BTN	No. 14	Ohio State	W 87–78	10–2 (1–0)	Xfinity Center (5,671); College Park, MD
01/03/2015; 4:00 pm, CBS	No. 14	at No. 12 Nebraska	W 75–47	11–2 (2–0)	Pinnacle Bank Arena (7,505); Lincoln, NE
01/08/2015; 6:30 pm, BTN	No. 12	Purdue	W 88–64	12–2 (3–0)	Xfinity Center (4,272); College Park, MD
01/11/2015; 3:00 pm, ESPN2	No. 12	at No. 23 Minnesota	W 77–73	13–2 (4–0)	Williams Arena (5,468); Minnesota, MN
01/15/2015; 9:00 pm, BTN	No. 8	at No. 24 Rutgers	W 71–59	14–2 (5–0)	The RAC (2,116); Piscataway, NJ
01/18/2015; 2:00 pm	No. 8	Illinois	W 74–54	15–2 (6–0)	Xfinity Center (6,191); College Park, MD
01/22/2015; 7:00 pm, BTN	No. 7	Michigan State	W 85–56	16–2 (7–0)	Xfinity Center (5,012); College Park, MD
01/25/2015; 3:00 pm, BTN	No. 7	at Indiana	W 84–74	17–2 (8–0)	Assembly Hall (3,670); Bloomington, IN
01/29/2015; 7:00 pm	No. 5	at Michigan	W 91–65	18–2 (9–0)	Crisler Center (1,358); Ann Arbor, MI
02/01/2015; 4:00 pm, ESPN2	No. 5	No. 20 Iowa	W 93–88	19–2 (10–0)	Xfinity Center (5,373); College Park, MD
02/05/2015; 7:00 pm	No. 5	at Penn State	W 77–62	20–2 (11–0)	Bryce Jordan Center (3,809); University Park, PA
02/08/2015; 4:00 pm, ESPN2	No. 5	No. 19 Nebraska	W 59–47	21–2 (12–0)	Xfinity Center (10,937); College Park, MD
02/10/2015; 9:00 pm, BTN	No. 5	No. 18 Rutgers	W 80–69	22–2 (13–0)	Xfinity Center (3,636); College Park, MD
02/16/2015; 7:00 pm, ESPN2	No. 5	at Michigan State	W 75–69	23–2 (14–0)	Breslin Center (5,562); East Lansing, MI
02/19/2015; 9:00 pm, BTN	No. 5	at Wisconsin	W 81–70	24–2 (15–0)	Kohl Center (3,026); Madison, WI
02/23/2015; 7:00 pm, BTN	No. 5	Penn State	W 65–34	25–2 (16–0)	Xfinity Center (6,307); College Park, MD
02/26/2015; 7:00 pm, BTN	No. 5	Indiana	W 83–72	26–2 (17–0)	Xfinity Center (5,601); College Park, MD
03/01/2015; 1:00 pm, BTN	No. 5	at No. 25 Northwestern	W 69–48	27–2 (18–0)	Welsh-Ryan Arena (1,743); Evanston, IL
Big Ten Conference Women's Tournament
03/06/2015; 12:30 pm, BTN	No. 4 (1)	vs. (9) Michigan State; Quarterfinals	W 70–60	28–2	Sears Centre (N/A); Hoffman Estates, IN
03/07/2015; 7:00 pm, BTN	No. 4 (1)	vs. No. 24 (4) Northwestern; Semifinals	W 74–63	29–2	Sears Centre (N/A); Hoffman Estates, IN
03/08/2015; 7:00 pm, ESPN	No. 4 (1)	vs. (3) Ohio State; Championship Game	W 77–74	30–2	Sears Centre (4,131); Hoffman Estates, IN
NCAA Women's Tournament
03/21/2015*; 1:30 pm, ESPN2	No. 4 (1 Spokane)	(16 Spokane) New Mexico State; First Round	W 75–57	31–2	Xfinity Center (7,948); College Park, MD
03/23/2015*; 6:30 pm, ESPN2	No. 4 (1 Spokane)	No. 13 (8 Spokane) Princeton; Second Round	W 85–70	32–2	Xfinity Center (7,794); College Park, MD
03/28/2015*; 4:30 pm, ESPN	No. 4 (1 Spokane)	vs. No. 16 (4 Spokane) Duke; Sweet Sixteen	W 65–55	33–2	Spokane Veterans Memorial Arena (N/A); Spokane, WA
03/30/2015*; 9:00 pm, ESPN	No. 4 (1 Spokane)	vs. No. 6 (2 Spokane) Tennessee; Elite Eight	W 58–48	34–2	Spokane Veterans Memorial Arena (5,064); Spokane, WA
04/05/2015*; 8:30 pm, ESPN	No. 4 (1 Spokane)	vs. No. 1 (1 Albany) Connecticut; Final Four	L 58–81	34–3	Amalie Arena (19,730); Tampa, FL
*Non-conference game. ^{#}Rankings from AP Poll, ( ) Tournament seedings in parentheses. (#) Tournament seedings in parentheses. All times are in Eastern Time.

== Rankings ==
Ranking movement Legend: ██ Increase in ranking. ██ Decrease in ranking. NR = Not ranked. RV = Received votes.
Poll	Pre	Wk 2	Wk 3	Wk 4	Wk 5	Wk 6	Wk 7	Wk 8	Wk 9	Wk 10	Wk 11	Wk 12	Wk 13	Wk 14	Wk 15	Wk 16	Wk 17	Wk 18	Final
AP	10	9	10	15	14	14	15	14	12	8	7	5	5	5	5	5	4	4	4
Coaches	8	8	8	10	11	11	9	10	10	8	6	5	5	5	5	5	3	3	3

== See also ==
- 2014–15 Maryland Terrapins men's basketball team
