= Tom Lochner =

American college basketball coach (born 1960)

Thomas Lochner (born June 14, 1960) is an American college basketball coach who is currently an assistant women's basketball coach at Lafayette College.

Lochner is most noted for his 23 years at La Salle University, serving as an assistant from 1987 to 2004 and as head coach from 2004 to 2010. In 2006–07, he led La Salle to 19 wins, its highest total in over a decade. The 2006 squad was only the second in school history to start a season 7–0, and posted a 10–3 home record. He previously served as an assistant coach at La Salle for 17 seasons, amassing a 296–196 record. He helped the team make two NCAA tournaments and one WNIT tournament. Lochner departed La Salle by mutual agreement following the 2009–10 season.

In 2011, Lochner joined the Delaware women's basketball staff as assistant to head coach Tina Martin.
