= Tina Martin =

American college basketball coach (born 1964)

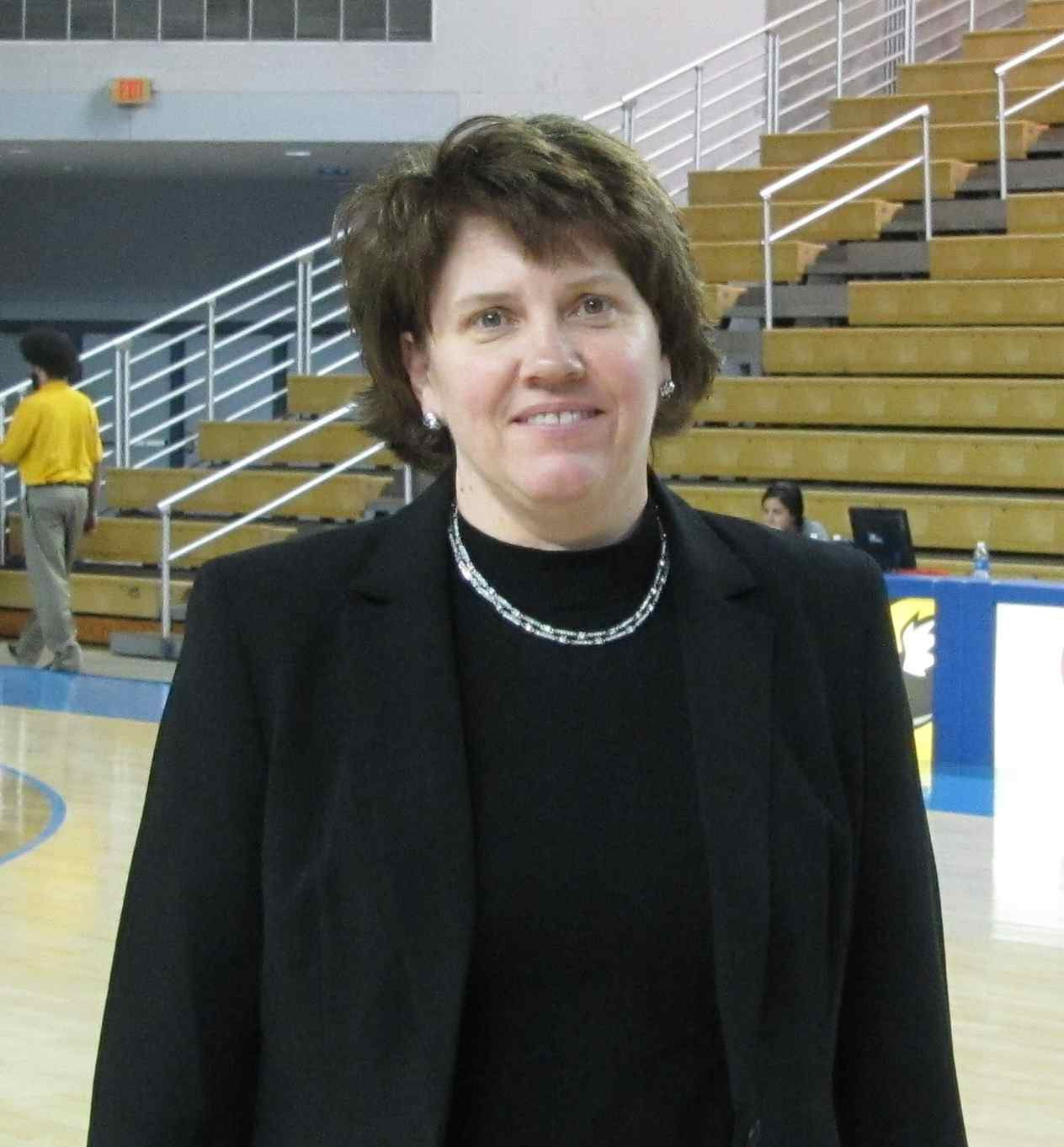

Biographical details
- Born: May 16, 1964 (age 61); Williamsport, Pennsylvania, U.S.

Playing career
- 1982–1986: Lock Haven

Coaching career (HC unless noted)
- 1986–1987: Lock Haven (grad. asst.)
- 1987–1996: Seton Hall (asst.)
- 1996–2017: Delaware
- 2017–2022: UNC Wilmington (asst.)
- 2022–2023: UNC Wilmington (interim HC)

Head coaching record
- Overall: 413–268 (.606)
- Tournaments: NCAA Division I: 3–4 (.429); WNIT: 0–7 (.000)

Tina Martin (born May 16, 1964) is an American former college basketball coach. From 1996 to 2017, she was the head women's basketball coach at the University of Delaware. She helped make Delaware a women's basketball power, with eleven 20-win seasons including four regular-season CAA championships. Her teams also made four NCAA Tournament appearances, in addition to five WNIT appearances. She served as an assistant coach at Seton Hall University and at UNC Wilmington where she became interim head coach on February 13, 2022 and continued to serve as head coach for the 2022–23 season.

== Early life and education ==
Born in Williamsport, Pennsylvania, Martin played college basketball at Lock Haven University of Pennsylvania from 1982 to 1986, earning two NCAA Division II All-American honors and scoring a Pennsylvania State Athletic Conference record 2,157 career points.

== Coaching career ==
Martin began her coaching career as a graduate assistant at Lock Haven for the 1986–87 season before joining Phyllis Mangina's staff at Seton Hall as an assistant coach in 1987. At Seton Hall, Martin helped a losing program make back-to-back NCAA Tournament appearances in 1994 and 1995 NCAA Division I women's basketball tournament. The 1993–94 Seton Hall team went 27–5 and made the Sweet 16 round of the NCAA Tournament and remains the most successful team in program history.

On May 14, 1996, the University of Delaware hired Martin as head coach for Delaware Fightin' Blue Hens women's basketball. Martin went 408–238 in 21 seasons as head coach, with four NCAA Tournament appearances (2001, 2007, 2012, and 2013) and seven Women's National Invitation Tournament appearances (2002, 2003, 2005, 2006, 2010, 2011, and 2014). The 2012–13 Delaware team was the most successful in her tenure, as the team finished 32–4 with both CAA regular season and tournament titles and the program's first-ever appearance in the NCAA Sweet 16. Elena Delle Donne, leading scorer of that team, was the second overall pick in the 2013 WNBA draft.

Martin retired from Delaware on April 28, 2017. In June 2017, Martin joined the staff at UNC Wilmington as an assistant coach and was made interim head coach in February 2022. She remained head coach for the 2022–23 season and was replaced after the season concluded by Nicole Woods.

== Head coaching record ==
Statistics overview
Season	Team	Overall	Conference	Standing	Postseason
Delaware Fightin' Blue Hens (America East Conference) (1996–2001)
1996–97	Delaware	9–19	6–12	7th	
1997–98	Delaware	6–21	3–15	10th	
1998–99	Delaware	16–11	10–8	5th	
1999–2000	Delaware	21–8	13–5	3rd	
2000–01	Delaware	26–5	17–1	1st	NCAA first round
Delaware (America East):		78–64 (.549)	49–41 (.544)		
Delaware Fightin' Blue Hens (Colonial Athletic Association) (2001–2017)
2001–02	Delaware	23–7	15–3	2nd	WNIT first round
2002–03	Delaware	22–9	15–3	T–1st	WNIT first round
2003–04	Delaware	19–10	10–8	4th	
2004–05	Delaware	25–6	16–2	1st	WNIT first round
2005–06	Delaware	22–8	13–5	3rd	WNIT first round
2006–07	Delaware	26–6	16–2	T–2nd	NCAA first round
2007–08	Delaware	7–24	6–12	9th	
2008–09	Delaware	15–15	7–11	9th	
2009–10	Delaware	21–12	11–7	5th	WNIT first round
2010–11	Delaware	20–14	10–8	T–5th	WNIT first round
2011–12	Delaware	31–2	18–0	1st	NCAA second round
2012–13	Delaware	32–4	18–0	1st	NCAA Sweet 16
2013–14	Delaware	20–11	10–6	2nd	WNIT First Round
2014–15	Delaware	15–17	8–10	7th	
2015–16	Delaware	16–15	10–8	5th	
2016–17	Delaware	16–14	10–8	4th	
Delaware (CAA):		330–174 (.655)	193–93 (.675)		
2021-22	UNC Wilmington	0–5	0–4	10th	
2022–23	UNC Wilmington	5–25	2–16	13th	
UNC Wilmington (CAA):		5–30 (.143)	2–20 (.091)		
Total:		413–268(.606)			
National champion Postseason invitational champion Conference regular season champion Conference regular season and conference tournament champion Division regular season champion Division regular season and conference tournament champion Conference tournament champion
