= The Show Place Arena =

Multi-purpose arena in Upper Marlboro, Maryland

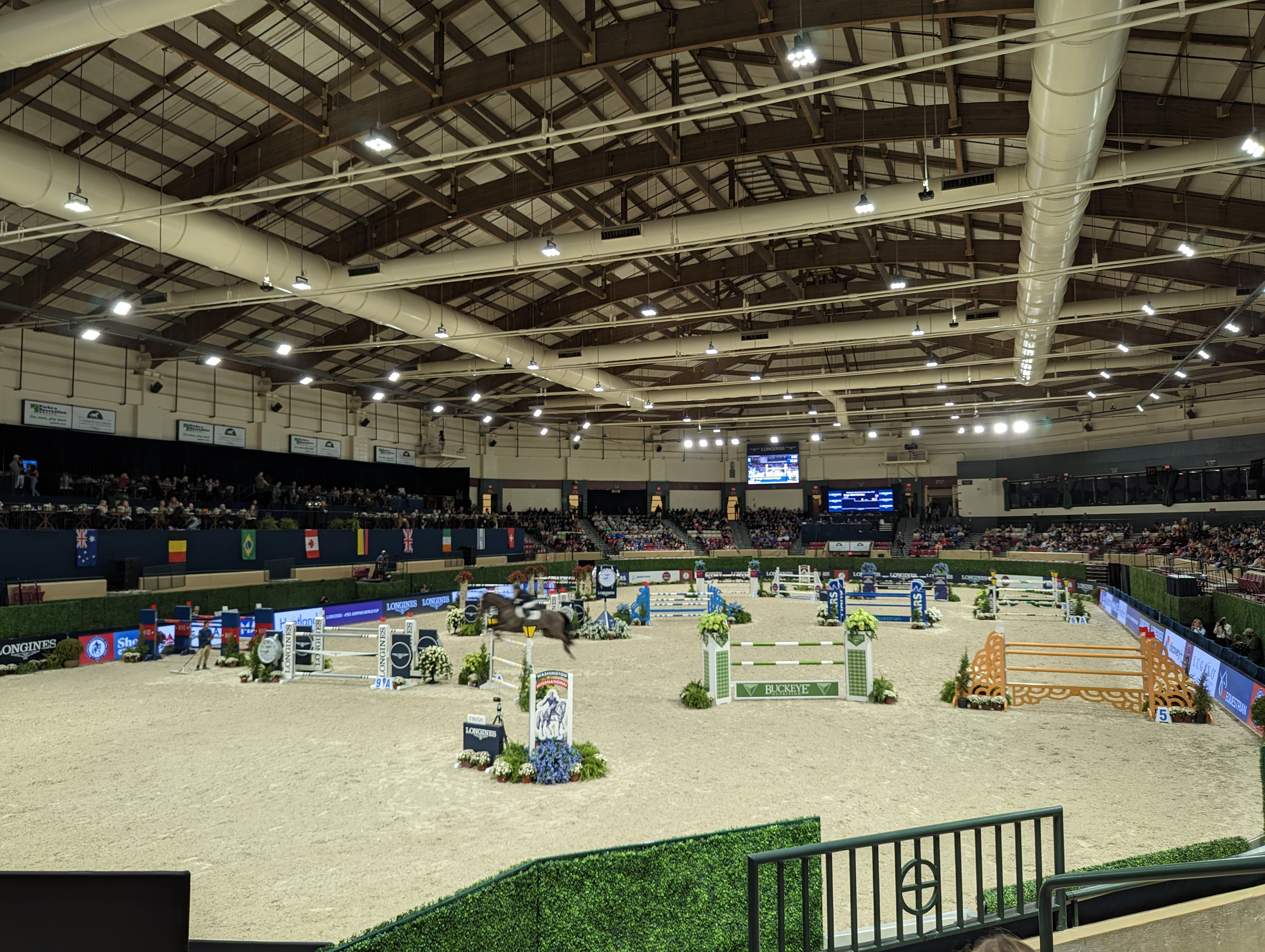
- Interior of Arena during the 2022 Washington International Horse Show.
- Interactive map of The Show Place Arena
- Location: 14900 Pennsylvania Avenue; Upper Marlboro, Maryland
- Coordinates: 38°48′38″N 76°45′1″W
- Owner: Maryland-National Capital Park and Planning Commission
- Capacity: 5,800

Construction
- Opened: 1993

Tenants
- Chesapeake Icebreakers (ECHL) (1997–1999); Maryland Nighthawks (ABA) (2004–2005); Chesapeake Tide (CIFL) (2007–2008); Maryland Maniacs (IFL) (2009); Colonial Athletic Association Women's Basketball Tournament (2011–2016)

Website
- www.showplacearena.com

The Show Place Arena is a 5,800-seat multi-purpose arena just south of Upper Marlboro, Maryland, which is used for sporting events, concerts, boxing and professional wrestling events, consumer shows, trade shows, religious services, graduations and other events. Opening in 1993, the Show Place Arena contains a 35,360-square-foot (136' by 260') floor allowing it to be used for various events such as concerts and trade shows. There are telescopic bleachers which can be placed in an open position to allow more permanent seating for events. In addition, equestrian, rodeo and other events use the arena with 6–8 inches of stonedust on the concrete floor to provide the preferred footing for equestrian events.

The arena is currently home to horse shows, computer shows, train shows, concerts, religious events, cultural festivals, trade shows and graduations. The facility was also the venue for the 2004–2005 season of the American Basketball Association Maryland Nighthawks as well as home of the Patriot League Men's and Women's Basketball Championship in 2002–2004, the Chesapeake Icebreakers minor league hockey team (1997–1999), the Chesapeake Tide and Maryland Maniacs indoor football teams and the 2010 Atlantic 10 Conference Women's Basketball Tournament. It had served as the host of the Colonial Athletic Association Women's Basketball Tournament from 2011 to 2016.

The arena has two Daktronics message/scoreboards and the floor to ceiling height measures 40 feet. There are three spotlights in the arena and a portable stage. The arena also contains two backstage ramps and two permanent concession stands plus a full-service bar. The arena also features ten handicapped-accessible restrooms and five private suites. There are three meeting rooms measuring a total of 7,000 square feet (700 m^{2}). Seating capacities are 3,000 for rodeos and horse shows, 5,500 for hockey and basketball, 5,200 for boxing and wrestling and up to 4,700 for concerts. A clock tower is located near the main entrance. There are 2,500 parking spaces at the complex with another 3,000 within walking distance.

In 2014, the building received significant upgrades to both the building and equipment used for hosting equestrian events.

In October 2022, it hosted the Washington International Horse Show. It was the first time in more than 20 years the WIHS was hosted in Prince George's County.

== Other facilities ==
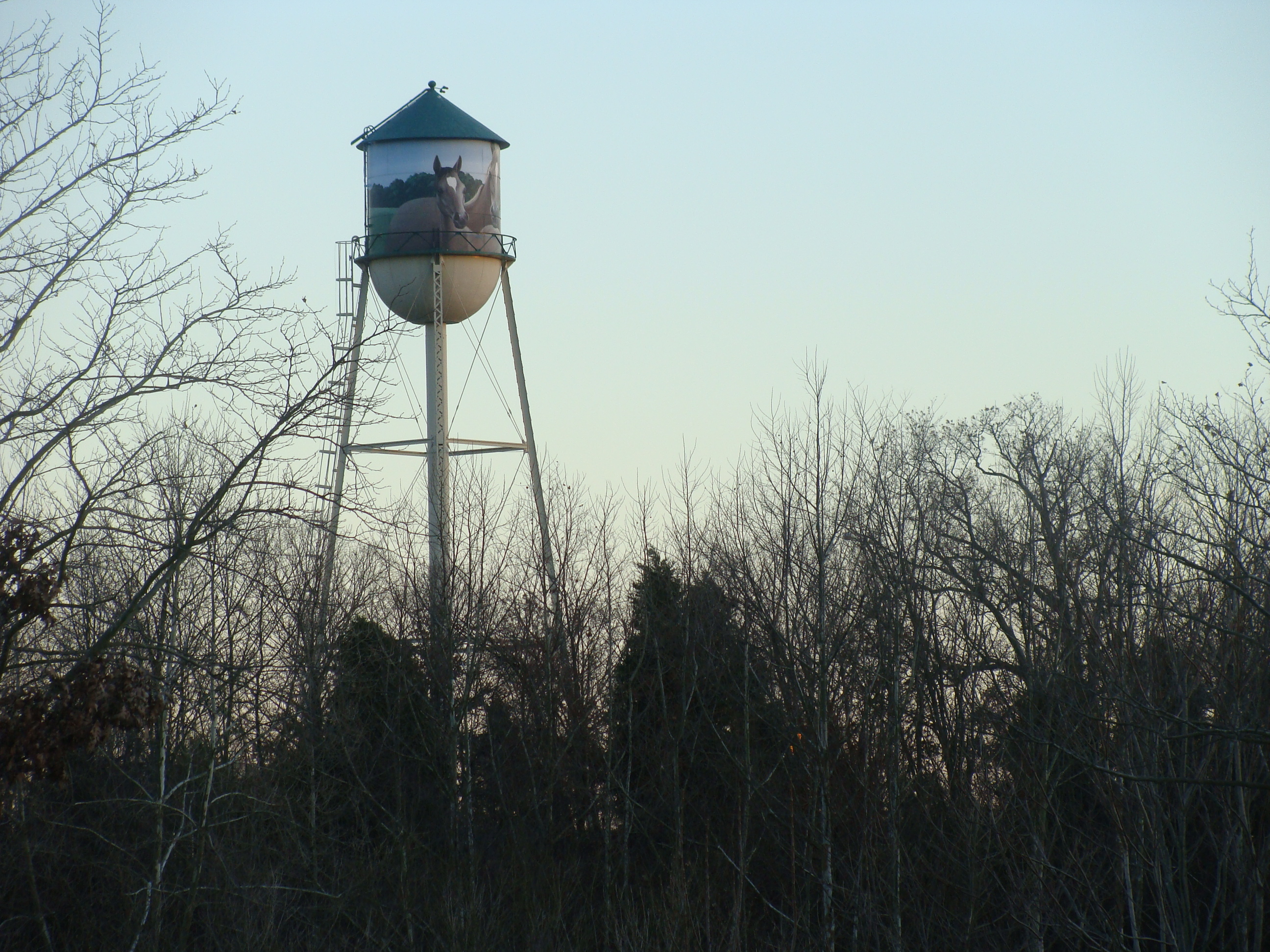
A painted watertower overlooking the Show Place Arena.

The Show Place Arena is located on the property of the Prince Georges Equestrian Center. The outdoor facilities include two 150' x 300' show rings with adjacent schooling rings, and one 140' x 280' show ring with adjacent schooling ring. Also located on the premises is a heated/air conditioned horse show secretaries office, permanent stabling for 240 horse, a vendor area, food concession building and an area for exhibitor campsites with electricity.
