= 2014–15 Washington Huskies women's basketball team =

Intercollegiate basketball season

2014–15 Washington Huskies women's basketball

Cancún Challenge Riviera Division champions

NCAA tournament, first round
- Conference: Pac-12 Conference
- Record: 23–10 (11–7 Pac-12)
- Head coach: Mike Neighbors (2nd season)
- Assistant coaches: Kevin Morrison; Fred Castro; Adia Barnes
- Home arena: Alaska Airlines Arena

2014–15 Pac-12 Conference women's basketball standings
| | Conf. | | | | Overall |
| Team | W | | L | PCT | W | | L | PCT |
|---|---|---|---|---|---|---|---|---|
| No. 10 Oregon State | 16 | – | 2 | .889 | 27 | – | 5 | .844 |
| No. 9 Arizona State | 15 | – | 3 | .833 | 29 | – | 6 | .829 |
| No. 14 Stanford^{†} | 13 | – | 5 | .722 | 26 | – | 10 | .722 |
| No. 24 California | 13 | – | 5 | .722 | 23 | – | 10 | .697 |
| Washington | 11 | – | 7 | .611 | 23 | – | 10 | .697 |
| UCLA | 8 | – | 10 | .444 | 19 | – | 18 | .514 |
| Washington State | 7 | – | 11 | .389 | 17 | – | 15 | .531 |
| USC | 7 | – | 11 | .389 | 15 | – | 15 | .500 |
| Colorado | 6 | – | 12 | .333 | 15 | – | 17 | .469 |
| Oregon | 6 | – | 12 | .333 | 13 | – | 17 | .433 |
| Arizona | 3 | – | 15 | .167 | 10 | – | 20 | .333 |
| Utah | 3 | – | 15 | .167 | 9 | – | 22 | .290 |
† 2015 Pac-12 Tournament winner As of April 4, 2015; Rankings from AP Poll

The 2014–15 Washington Huskies women's basketball team represented University of Washington during the 2014–15 NCAA Division I women's basketball season. The Huskies, led by second-year head coach Mike Neighbors, played their home games at Alaska Airlines Arena and were members of the Pac-12 Conference. They finished the season 23–10, 11–7 in Pac-12 play to finish in fifth place. They advanced to the quarterfinals of the Pac-12 women's tournament, where they lost to California. They received an at-large bid to the NCAA women's basketball tournament, which was their first trip to the NCAA Women's Tournament since 2007. They lost to Miami (FL) in the first round.

== Previous season ==
The Washington Huskies finished the 2013–14 season with an overall record of 20–14, with a record of 10–8 in the Pac-12 regular season. In the 2014 Pac-12 Tournament, the Huskies were defeated by Utah, 65–53 in the first round. They lost in the quarterfinals in the 2014 Women's National Invitation Tournament to UTEP, 70–63.

== Departures ==
| Name | Number | Pos. | Height | Year | Hometown | Reason for departure |
|---|---|---|---|---|---|---|
| Mercedes Wetmore | 1 | G | 5'8" | Senior | Lake Tapps, Washington | Graduated |
| Kassia Fortier | 30 | G | 5'8" | Senior | Issaquah, Washington | Graduated |

== 2014 recruiting class ==
College recruiting
| Name | Hometown | School | Height | Weight | Commit date |
|---|---|---|---|---|---|
| Hannah Johnson; W | Mission Hills, California | Bishop Alemany High School | 6 ft 0 in (1.83 m) | N/A | |
| Hannah Johnson; W | Recruit ratings: (90) | | | | |
| Kelli Kingma; PG | Mill Creek, Washington | Henry M. Jackson High School | 5 ft 9 in (1.75 m) | N/A | |
| Kelli Kingma; PG | Recruit ratings: (89) | | | | |
Overall recruit ranking:
Note: In many cases, Scout, Rivals, 247Sports, On3, and ESPN may conflict in their listings of height and weight.; In these cases, the average was taken. ESPN grades are on a 100-point scale.; Sources: "2014 Team Ranking". Rivals.

== Roster ==
2014–15 Washington Huskies women's basketball team
Players
Coaches

| Pos. | # | Name | Height | Year | Previous school | Hometown |
|---|---|---|---|---|---|---|
| F/C | 0 | Chantel Osahor | 6 ft 2 in (1.88 m) | So | Saint Mary's | Phoenix, AZ |
| F | 1 | Hannah Johnson | 6 ft 1 in (1.85 m) | Fr | Bishop Alemany | Los Angeles, CA |
| F | 3 | Talia Walton | 6 ft 2 in (1.88 m) | RS Jr | Federal Way | Federal Way, WA |
| G | 10 | Kelsey Plum | 5 ft 9 in (1.75 m) | So | La Jolla Country Day | Poway, CA |
| F/C | 11 | Mathilde Gilling | 6 ft 3 in (1.91 m) | Jr | Rungsted Gymnasium | Rungsted Kyst, Denmark |
| F/C | 13 | Katie Collier | 6 ft 3 in (1.91 m) | RS So | Seattle Christian | Covington, WA |
| G/F | 14 | Heather Corral | 6 ft 1 in (1.85 m) | Jr | Prairie | Vancouver, WA |
| G/F | 15 | Khalia Lark | 6 ft 0 in (1.83 m) | Fr | Mater Dei | Irvine, CA |
| G | 20 | Kelli Kingma | 5 ft 8 in (1.73 m) | Fr | Henry M. Jackson | Mill Creek, WA |
| G | 21 | Brianna Ruiz | 5 ft 10 in (1.78 m) | RS Fr | Del Oro | Sacramento, CA |
| G | 22 | Alexus Atchley | 5 ft 9 in (1.75 m) | Jr | Yorba Linda | Yorba Linda, CA |
| F | 23 | Aminah Williams | 6 ft 0 in (1.83 m) | Sr | Kennedy | Seattle, WA |
| G | 32 | Jazmine Davis | 5 ft 7 in (1.7 m) | Sr | Valley Christian | San Jose, CA |
| G | 42 | Mackenzie Wieburg | 5 ft 9 in (1.75 m) | Fr | Issaquah | Sammamish, WA |

Head coach

Mike Neighbors

Assistant coach(es)

Kevin Morrison
Fred Castro
Adia Barnes

Legend

- (C) Team captain
- (S) Suspended
- (I) Ineligible
- (W) Walk-on
- Injured
- Current redshirt

Roster
Last update: 2014-09-14

== Schedule ==
| Date time, TV | Rank^{#} | Opponent^{#} | Result | Record | Site (attendance) city, state |
Exhibition
| 11/05/2014*; 7:00 pm | | Concordia (Oregon) | W 95–45 | – | Alaska Airlines Arena (N/A); Seattle, WA |
Non-conference regular season
| 11/14/2014*; 5:00 pm | | at Oklahoma | L 80–90 | 0–1 | Lloyd Noble Center (5,230); Norman, OK |
| 11/20/2014*; 7:00 pm | | South Dakota | W 96–82 | 1–1 | Alaska Airlines Arena (1,363); Seattle, WA |
| 11/23/2014*; 7:30 pm | | Yale | W 81–51 | 2–1 | Alaska Airlines Arena (2,019); Seattle, WA |
| 11/27/2014*; 12:30 pm | | vs. Florida State; Cancún Challenge Riviera Division | W 80–68 | 3–1 | Moon Palace Golf & Spa Resort (650); Cancún, Mexico |
| 11/28/2014*; 12:30 pm | | vs. Hartford; Cancún Challenge Riviera Division | W 81–70 | 4–1 | Moon Palace Golf & Spa Resort (650); Cancún, Mexico |
| 11/29/2014*; 10:00 am | | vs. Furman; Cancún Challenge Riviera Division | W 101–69 | 5–1 | Moon Palace Golf & Spa Resort (650); Cancún, Mexico |
| 12/04/2014*; 7:00 pm | | at Seattle | W 102–69 | 6–1 | KeyArena (925); Seattle, WA |
| 12/07/2014*; 2:00 pm | | at Portland | W 80–45 | 7–1 | Chiles Center (341); Portland, OR |
| 12/14/2014*; 12:00 pm | | Grambling State | W 84–53 | 8–1 | Alaska Airlines Arena (1,379); Seattle, WA |
| 12/18/2014*; 6:00 pm | | at San Diego State | W 69–48 | 9–1 | Viejas Arena (925); San Diego, CA |
| 12/20/2014*; 5:00 pm | | at UC Riverside | W 74–71 | 10–1 | SRC Arena (310); Riverside, CA |
| 12/29/2014*; 6:00 pm, P12N | | No. 5 Texas A&M | W 70–49 | 11–1 | Alaska Airlines Arena (2,669); Seattle, WA |
Pac-12 regular season
| 01/03/2015; 1:00 pm, P12N | | at No. 22 Arizona State | L 48–62 | 11–2 (0–1) | Wells Fargo Arena (1,877); Tempe, AZ |
| 01/05/2015; 5:00 pm, P12N | | at Arizona | W 79–69 | 12–2 (1–1) | McKale Center (891); Tucson, AZ |
| 01/09/2015; 7:00 pm, P12N | | No. 15 Stanford | L 56–60 | 12–3 (1–2) | Alaska Airlines Arena (2,677); Seattle, WA |
| 01/11/2015; 3:00 pm, P12N | | California | W 79–77 | 13–3 (2–2) | Alaska Airlines Arena (2,795); Seattle, WA |
| 01/16/2015; 8:00 pm, P12N | | at Oregon | W 91–69 | 14–3 (3–2) | Matthew Knight Arena (1,317); Eugene, OR |
| 01/19/2015; 5:00 pm, P12N | | at No. 9 Oregon State | L 67–75 | 14–4 (3–3) | Gill Coliseum (3,262); Corvallis, OR |
| 01/23/2015; 7:00 pm, P12N | | Colorado | W 85–82 | 15–4 (4–3) | Alaska Airlines Arena (1,753); Seattle, WA |
| 01/25/2015; 11:00 am, P12N | | Utah | W 63–51 | 16–4 (5–3) | Alaska Airlines Arena (2,281); Seattle, WA |
| 01/31/2015; 2:30 pm, P12N | | at California | L 58–82 | 16–5 (5–4) | Haas Pavilion (2,962); Berkeley, CA |
| 02/02/2015; 7:00 pm, P12N | | at No. 12 Stanford | L 69–82 | 16–6 (5–5) | Maples Pavilion (2,885); Stanford, CA |
| 02/06/2015; 7:00 pm, P12N | | No. 7 Oregon State | W 76–67 | 17–6 (6–5) | Alaska Airlines Arena (2,510); Seattle, WA |
| 02/08/2015; 6:00 pm, P12N | | Oregon | W 70–55 | 18–6 (7–5) | Alaska Airlines Arena (2,232); Seattle, WA |
| 02/13/2015; 6:00 pm | | at Utah | L 61–69 | 18–7 (7–6) | Jon M. Huntsman Center (768); Salt Lake City, UT |
| 02/15/2015; 4:30 pm | | at Colorado | W 79–67 | 19–7 (8–6) | Coors Events Center (2,029); Boulder, CO |
| 02/20/2015; 7:00 pm, P12N | | Washington State | L 72–83 | 19–8 (8–7) | Alaska Airlines Arena (2,920); Seattle, WA |
| 02/22/2015; 1:00 pm, P12N | | at Washington State | W 83–43 | 20–8 (9–7) | Beasley Coliseum (1,203); Pullman, WA |
| 02/26/2015; 6:00 pm, P12N | | USC | W 60–48 | 21–8 (10–7) | Alaska Airlines Arena (1,717); Seattle, WA |
| 02/28/2015; 1:00 pm, P12N | | UCLA | W 74–61 | 22–8 (11–7) | Alaska Airlines Arena (3,447); Seattle, WA |
2015 Pac-12 Conference Women's Tournament
| 03/05/2015; 8:30 pm, P12N | | vs. Utah; First Round | W 75–64 | 23–8 | KeyArena (3,654); Seattle, WA |
| 03/06/2015; 8:30 pm, P12N | | vs. California; Quarterfinals | L 53–69 | 23–9 | KeyArena (5,545); Seattle, WA |
NCAA Women's Tournament
| 03/20/2015*; 9:00 am, ESPN2 | | vs. Miami (FL); First Round | L 80–86 | 23–10 | Carver–Hawkeye Arena (N/A); Iowa City, IA |
*Non-conference game. ^{#}Rankings from AP Poll. (#) Tournament seedings in parentheses. All times are in Pacific Time.

== Rankings ==
Ranking movement Legend: ██ Increase in ranking. ██ Decrease in ranking. NR = Not ranked. RV = Received votes.
| Poll | Pre | Wk 2 | Wk 3 | Wk 4 | Wk 5 | Wk 6 | Wk 7 | Wk 8 | Wk 9 | Wk 10 | Wk 11 | Wk 12 | Wk 13 | Wk 14 | Wk 15 | Wk 16 | Wk 17 | Wk 18 | Final |
|---|---|---|---|---|---|---|---|---|---|---|---|---|---|---|---|---|---|---|---|
| AP | NR | NR | NR | RV | RV | RV | RV | RV | RV | RV | RV | RV | NR | RV | RV | RV | RV | NR | NR |
| Coaches | NR | NR | NR | RV | RV | RV | RV | 23 | RV | RV | RV | RV | RV | RV | RV | RV | RV | NR | NR |

== See also ==
- 2014–15 Washington Huskies men's basketball team
