= 2015 Pac-12 Conference Tournament =

2015 Pac-12 Conference Tournament may refer to:

- 2015 Pac-12 Conference men's basketball tournament
- 2015 Pac-12 Conference women's basketball tournament
