= 2014–15 USC Trojans women's basketball team =

Intercollegiate basketball season

2014–15 USC Trojans women's basketball

SMU Thanksgiving Classic Champions
- Conference: Pac-12 Conference
- Record: 15–15 (7–11 Pac-12)
- Head coach: Cynthia Cooper-Dyke (2nd season)
- Assistant coaches: Beth Burns; Jualeah Woods; Taja Edwards
- Home arena: Galen Center

2014–15 Pac-12 Conference women's basketball standings
	Conf.				Overall
Team	W		L	PCT	W		L	PCT
No. 10 Oregon State	16	–	2	.889	27	–	5	.844
No. 9 Arizona State	15	–	3	.833	29	–	6	.829
No. 14 Stanford^{†}	13	–	5	.722	26	–	10	.722
No. 24 California	13	–	5	.722	23	–	10	.697
Washington	11	–	7	.611	23	–	10	.697
UCLA	8	–	10	.444	19	–	18	.514
Washington State	7	–	11	.389	17	–	15	.531
USC	7	–	11	.389	15	–	15	.500
Colorado	6	–	12	.333	15	–	17	.469
Oregon	6	–	12	.333	13	–	17	.433
Arizona	3	–	15	.167	10	–	20	.333
Utah	3	–	15	.167	9	–	22	.290
† 2015 Pac-12 Tournament winner As of April 4, 2015; Rankings from AP Poll

The 2014–15 USC Trojans women's basketball team represented University of Southern California during the 2014–15 NCAA Division I women's basketball season. The Trojans, led by second year head coach Cynthia Cooper-Dyke, played their home games at the Galen Center as members of the Pac-12 Conference. They finished the season 15–15, 7–11 in Pac-12 play to finish in a tie for seventh place. They lost in the first round of the Pac-12 women's basketball tournament to Colorado.

== Roster ==
2014–15 USC Trojans women's basketball team
Players
Coaches

Pos.	#	Name	Height	Year	Previous school	Hometown
G	1	Jordan Adams	6 ft 1 in (1.85 m)	RS So	Mater Dei HS	Irvine, CA
G	5	McKenzie Calvert	5 ft 9 in (1.75 m)	Fr	Byron P. Steele HS	Schertz, TX
G	10	Courtney Jaco	5 ft 8 in (1.73 m)	So	Windward School	Compton, CA
F	13	Kaneisha Horn	6 ft 1 in (1.85 m)	Sr	Ramsay High School; Alabama	Birmingham, AL
F	21	Alexyz Vaioletama	6 ft 1 in (1.85 m)	Sr	Mater Dei HS	Fountain Valley, CA
G	23	Brianna Barrett	5 ft 7 in (1.7 m)	Jr	Oaks Christian School	Winnetka, CA
F	24	Drew Edelman	6 ft 4 in (1.93 m)	So	Menlo School	Sunnydale, CA
F	25	Alexis Lloyd	5 ft 10 in (1.78 m)	RS So	Whitney Young HS; Virginia Tech	Chicago, IL
G	32	Kiki Alofaituli	6 ft 1 in (1.85 m)	Sr	Mater Dei HS	Tustin, CA
F	35	Kristen Simon	6 ft 1 in (1.85 m)	Fr	Windward School	Gardena, CA
F	42	Amy Okonkwo	6 ft 2 in (1.88 m)	Fr	Etiwanda HS	Fontana, CA

Head coach

Cynthia Cooper-Dyke

Assistant coach(es)

Beth Burns
Jualeah Woods
Taja Edwards

Legend

- (C) Team captain
- (S) Suspended
- (I) Ineligible
- (W) Walk-on
- Injured
- Current redshirt

Roster

== Schedule ==
Date time, TV	Rank^{#}	Opponent^{#}	Result	Record	Site (attendance) city, state
Exhibition
11/09/2014*; 2:00 pm		Concordia (California)	W 120–56	–	Galen Center (7,135); Los Angeles, CA
Regular Season
11/15/2014*; 4:00 pm		at No. 2 South Carolina	L 61–70	0–1	Colonial Life Arena (10,057); Columbia, SC
11/17/2014*; 4:00 pm		at Davidson	W 99–64	1–1	John M. Belk Arena (583); Davidson, NC
11/21/2014*; 4:30 pm		at Long Beach State	W 90–85 ^{OT}	2–1	Walter Pyramid (1,140); Long Beach, CA
11/23/2014*; 2:00 pm		Fresno State	W 68–50	3–1	Galen Center (801); Los Angeles, CA
11/28/2014*; 5:00 pm		vs. Sam Houston State; SMU Thanksgiving Classic semifinals	W 88–67	4–1	Moody Coliseum (738); Dallas, TX
11/29/2014*; 3:00 pm		at SMU; SMU Thanksgiving Classic championship	W 64–57	5–1	Moody Coliseum (641); Dallas, TX
12/06/2014*; 5:00 pm		at Saint Mary's	L 58–64	5–2	McKeon Pavilion (559); Moraga, CA
12/09/2014*; 6:00 pm		Cal State Northridge	W 85–74 ^{OT}	6–2	Galen Center (399); Los Angeles, CA
12/14/2014*; 2:00 pm		Sacramento State	W 101–99	7–2	Galen Center (498); Los Angeles, CA
12/18/2014*; 4:00 pm		Loyola Marymount	W 96–54	8–2	Galen Center (313); Los Angeles, CA
12/21/2014*; 12:00 pm, P12N		No. 19 Oklahoma State	L 62–66	8–3	Galen Center (729); Los Angeles, CA
12/30/2014; 6:00 pm, P12N		UCLA; Rivalry	L 52–59	8–4 (0–1)	Galen Center (1,587); Los Angeles, CA
01/03/2015; 3:00 pm, P12N		Oregon	W 70–54	9–4 (1–1)	Galen Center (956); Los Angeles, CA
01/05/2015; 7:00 pm, P12N		Oregon State	L 66–76	9–5 (1–2)	Galen Center (302); Los Angeles, CA
01/09/2015; 7:00 pm, P12N		at Colorado	W 81–61	10–5 (2–2)	Coors Events Center (1,701); Boulder, CO
01/11/2015; 11:00 am, P12N		at Utah	W 46–43	11–5 (3–2)	Jon M. Huntsman Center (652); Salt Lake City, UT
01/18/2015; 7:30 pm, P12N		at UCLA; Rivalry	L 60–71	11–6 (3–3)	Pauley Pavilion (4,022); Los Angeles, CA
01/23/2015; 7:00 pm		California	L 53–67	11–7 (3–4)	Galen Center (423); Los Angeles, CA
01/25/2015; 5:00 pm, P12N		No. 11 Stanford	L 60–71	11–8 (3–5)	Galen Center (1,312); Los Angeles, CA
01/31/2015; 2:30 pm, P12N		at No. 7 Oregon State	L 35–68	11–9 (3–6)	Gill Coliseum (4,511); Corvallis, OR
02/02/2015; 5:00 pm, P12N		at Oregon	L 57–63	11–10 (3–7)	Matthew Knight Arena (1,208); Eugene, OR
02/06/2015; 7:00 pm, P12N		Utah	W 73–54	12–10 (4–7)	Galen Center (246); Los Angeles, CA
02/08/2015; 12:00 pm, P12N		Colorado	W 66–51	13–10 (5–7)	Galen Center (752); Los Angeles, CA
02/13/2015; 6:00 pm, P12N		at No. 19 Stanford	L 60–79	13–11 (5–8)	Maples Pavilion (3,403); Stanford, CA
02/15/2015; 6:30 pm, P12N		at California	W 65–54	14–11 (6–8)	Haas Pavilion (2,841); Berkeley, CA
02/20/2015; 7:00 pm		Arizona	W 77–51	15–11 (7–8)	Galen Center (526); Los Angeles, CA
02/22/2015; 3:00 pm, P12N		No. 12 Arizona State	L 73–76 ^{2OT}	15–12 (7–9)	Galen Center (2,800); Los Angeles, CA
02/26/2015; 6:00 pm, P12N		at Washington	L 48–60	15–13 (7–10)	Alaska Airlines Arena (1,717); Seattle, WA
02/28/2015; 3:00 pm, P12N		at Washington State	L 62–68	15–14 (7–11)	Beasley Coliseum (827); Pullman, WA
2015 Pac-12 Conference Women's Tournament
03/05/2015; 6:00 pm, P12N		vs. Colorado; First Round	L 63–75	15–15	KeyArena (N/A); Seattle, WA
*Non-conference game. ^{#}Rankings from AP Poll. (#) Tournament seedings in parentheses. All times are in Pacific Time.

== See also ==
- 2014–15 USC Trojans men's basketball team
