= 2014–15 Washington State Cougars women's basketball team =

Intercollegiate basketball season

2014–15 Washington State Cougars women's basketball

WNIT, First Round
- Conference: Pac-12 Conference
- Record: 17–15 (7–11 Pac-12)
- Head coach: June Daugherty (8th season)
- Associate head coach: Brian Holsinger
- Assistant coaches: Mike Daugherty; Ashley Grover
- Home arena: Beasley Coliseum

2014–15 Pac-12 Conference women's basketball standings
	Conf.				Overall
Team	W		L	PCT	W		L	PCT
No. 10 Oregon State	16	–	2	.889	27	–	5	.844
No. 9 Arizona State	15	–	3	.833	29	–	6	.829
No. 14 Stanford^{†}	13	–	5	.722	26	–	10	.722
No. 24 California	13	–	5	.722	23	–	10	.697
Washington	11	–	7	.611	23	–	10	.697
UCLA	8	–	10	.444	19	–	18	.514
Washington State	7	–	11	.389	17	–	15	.531
USC	7	–	11	.389	15	–	15	.500
Colorado	6	–	12	.333	15	–	17	.469
Oregon	6	–	12	.333	13	–	17	.433
Arizona	3	–	15	.167	10	–	20	.333
Utah	3	–	15	.167	9	–	22	.290
† 2015 Pac-12 Tournament winner As of April 4, 2015; Rankings from AP Poll

The 2014–15 Washington State Cougars women's basketball team represented Washington State University during the 2014–15 NCAA Division I women's basketball season. The Cougars, led by eighth-year head coach June Daugherty, played their games at the Beasley Coliseum and were members of the Pac-12 Conference. They finished the season 17–15, 7–11 in the Pac-12 to finish in a tie for seventh place. They advanced to the quarterfinals of the Pac-12 women's tournament, where they lost to Arizona State. They were invited to the Women's National Invitation Tournament, where they lost in the first round against their in-state rival Eastern Washington.

== Roster ==
2014–15 Washington State Cougars women's basketball team
Players
Coaches

Pos.	#	Name	Height	Year	Previous school	Hometown
G	0	Ashley Bolston	6 ft 2 in (1.88 m)	Fr	South Medford HS	Medford, OR
G	1	Caila Hailey	5 ft 10 in (1.78 m)	Fr	Serra HS	Inglewood, CA
G	2	Krystle McKenzie	5 ft 8 in (1.73 m)	Fr		Brisbane, Australia
G	3	Lia Galdeira	5 ft 11 in (1.8 m)	Jr	Konawaena HS	Kamuela, HI
G	5	Tia Presley	5 ft 10 in (1.78 m)	Sr	Gonzaga Prep	Spokane, WA
G	10	Alexas Williamson	5 ft 9 in (1.75 m)	Jr	Mater Dei	Chino Hills, CA
G	11	Dawnyelle Awa	5 ft 9 in (1.75 m)	Jr	Konawaena HS	Kealakekua, HI
G	12	Taylor Edmundson	5 ft 11 in (1.8 m)	Jr	Carlsbad HS	Carlsbad, NM
F	15	Ivana Kmetovska	6 ft 3 in (1.91 m)	So	Orce Nikolov	Skopeje, Macedonia
F	21	Nike McClure	6 ft 3 in (1.91 m)	Fr	W. F. West HS	Tenino, WA
G	22	Pinelopi Pavlopoulou	5 ft 8 in (1.73 m)	Fr	ACS Athens	Athens, Greece
C	23	Shalie Dheensaw	6 ft 4 in (1.93 m)	Fr	Claremont Secondary	Victoria, BC
C	24	Bianca Blanaru	6 ft 5 in (1.96 m)	Fr		Timișoara, Romania
F	34	Mariah Cooks	6 ft 2 in (1.88 m)	Jr	Ernest Righetti	Santa Maria, CA
F	42	Louise Brown	6 ft 1 in (1.85 m)	Fr		Melbourne, Australia

Head coach

June Daugherty

Assistant coach(es)

Brian Holsinger
Mike Daugherty
Ashley Grover

Legend

- (C) Team captain
- (S) Suspended
- (I) Ineligible
- (W) Walk-on
- Injured
- Current redshirt

Roster

== Schedule ==
Date time, TV	Rank^{#}	Opponent^{#}	Result	Record	Site (attendance) city, state
Exhibition
11/02/2014*; 7:00 pm		Central Methodist	W 71–56	–	Beasley Coliseum (533); Pullman, WA
Non-conference regular season
11/14/2014*; 7:00 pm		No. 22 Dayton	W 76–60	1–0	Beasley Coliseum (827); Pullman, WA
11/16/2014*; 1:00 pm		Idaho State	W 84–34	2–0	Beasley Coliseum (622); Pullman, WA
11/19/2014*; 8:00 pm, P12N		No. 16 Nebraska	L 61–82	2–1	Beasley Coliseum (853); Pullman, WA
11/21/2014*; 8:30 pm		Seattle	W 82–62	3–1	Beasley Coliseum (2,138); Pullman, WA
11/25/2014*; 4:00 pm		at Hampton	W 74–60	4–1	Hampton Convocation Center (1,500); Hampton, VA
11/28/2014*; 9:00 am		vs. Michigan; San Juan Shootout	L 64–76	4–2	Mario Morales Coliseum (N/A); Guaynabo, PR
11/29/2014*; 11:30 am		vs. No. 10 Maryland; San Juan Shootout	W 70–64	5–2	Mario Morales Coliseum (N/A); Guaynabo, PR
12/04/2014*; 4:00 pm		at UC Santa Barbara	W 81–55	6–2	The Thunderdome (352); Santa Barbara, CA
12/09/2014*; 6:00 pm, SWX		at Gonzaga	W 59–58	7–2	McCarthey Athletic Center (5,363); Spokane, WA
12/20/2014*; 1:00 pm		Montana State	W 82–61	8–2	Beasley Coliseum (942); Pullman, WA
12/22/2014*; 2:00 pm		at Loyola Marymount	W 87–60	9–2	Gersten Pavilion (308); Los Angeles, CA
Pac-12 regular season
01/03/2015; 11:00 am, P12N		at Arizona	W 81–70	10–2 (1–0)	McKale Center (1,160); Tucson, AZ
01/05/2015; 7:00 pm, P12N		at No. 18 Arizona State	L 64–78	10–3 (1–1)	Wells Fargo Arena (1,366); Tempe, AZ
01/09/2015; 5:00 pm, P12N		California	L 62–70	10–4 (1–2)	Beasley Coliseum (923); Pullman, WA
01/11/2015; 1:00 pm, P12N		No. 15 Stanford	L 76–86 ^{OT}	10–5 (1–3)	Beasley Coliseum (1,098); Pullman, WA
01/16/2015; 6:00 pm, P12N		at No. 9 Oregon State	L 70–73	10–6 (1–4)	Gill Coliseum (3,087); Corvallis, OR
01/18/2015; 1:00 pm, P12N		at Oregon	W 79–76	11–6 (2–4)	Matthew Knight Arena (1,888); Eugene, OR
01/23/2015; 7:00 pm		Utah	W 63–54	12–6 (3–4)	Beasley Coliseum (874); Pullman, WA
01/25/2015; 1:00 pm, P12N		Colorado	W 73–68	13–6 (4–4)	Beasley Coliseum (887); Pullman, WA
01/31/2015; 12:30 pm, P12N		at No. 12 Stanford	L 56–75	13–7 (4–5)	Maples Pavilion (3,118); Stanford, CA
02/02/2015; 5:00 pm, P12N		at California	L 54–57	13–8 (4–6)	Haas Pavilion (1,026); Berkeley, CA
02/06/2015; 5:00 pm, P12N		Oregon	L 69–70	13–9 (4–7)	Beasley Coliseum (1,009); Pullman, WA
02/08/2015; 2:00 pm, P12N		Oregon State	L 56–61	13–10 (4–8)	Beasley Coliseum (1,102); Pullman, WA
02/13/2015; 6:00 pm		at Colorado	L 51–72	13–11 (4–9)	Coors Events Center (2,055); Boulder, CO
02/15/2015; 11:00 am, P12N		at Utah	W 61–52	14–11 (5–9)	Jon M. Huntsman Center (653); Salt Lake City, UT
02/20/2015; 7:30 pm, P12N		at Washington	W 83–72	15–11 (6–9)	Alaska Airlines Arena (2,920); Seattle, WA
02/22/2015; 1:00 pm, P12N		Washington	L 43–83	15–12 (6–10)	Beasley Coliseum (1,203); Pullman, WA
02/26/2015; 7:00 pm		UCLA	L 69–74	15–13 (6–11)	Beasley Coliseum (573); Pullman, WA
02/28/2015; 3:00 pm, P12N		USC	W 68–62	16–13 (7–11)	Beasley Coliseum (827); Pullman, WA
Pac-12 Women's Tournament
03/05/2015; 11:30 am, P12N		vs. Oregon; First Round	W 66–64	17–13	KeyArena (N/A); Seattle, WA
03/06/2015; 11:30 am, P12N		vs. No. 9 Arizona State; Quarterfinals	L 48–67	17–14	KeyArena (N/A); Seattle, WA
WNIT
03/18/2015*; 7:00 pm		Eastern Washington; First Round	L 65–67	17–15	Beasley Coliseum (903); Pullman, WA
*Non-conference game. ^{#}Rankings from AP Poll. (#) Tournament seedings in parentheses. All times are in Pacific Time.

== Rankings ==
Ranking movement Legend: ██ Increase in ranking. ██ Decrease in ranking. NR = Not ranked. RV = Received votes.
Poll	Pre	Wk 2	Wk 3	Wk 4	Wk 5	Wk 6	Wk 7	Wk 8	Wk 9	Wk 10	Wk 11	Wk 12	Wk 13	Wk 14	Wk 15	Wk 16	Wk 17	Wk 18	Final
AP	NR	RV	RV	RV	RV	RV	RV	RV	RV	NR	NR	NR	NR	NR	NR	NR	NR	NR	NR
Coaches	NR	RV	NR	NR	RV	RV	RV	NR	NR	NR	NR	NR	NR	NR	NR	NR	NR	NR	NR

== See also ==
- 2014–15 Washington State Cougars men's basketball team
