= 2014–15 California Golden Bears women's basketball team =

Intercollegiate basketball season

2014–15 California Golden Bears women's basketball

Cal Classic Champions

NCAA Women's Tournament, second round
- Conference: Pac-12 Conference

Ranking
- AP: No. 24
- Record: 24–10 (13–5 Pac-12)
- Head coach: Lindsay Gottlieb (4th season)
- Assistant coaches: Charmin Smith; Jeff Cammon; Kai Felton
- Home arena: Haas Pavilion

2014–15 Pac-12 Conference women's basketball standings
| | Conf. | | | | Overall |
| Team | W | | L | PCT | W | | L | PCT |
|---|---|---|---|---|---|---|---|---|
| No. 10 Oregon State | 16 | – | 2 | .889 | 27 | – | 5 | .844 |
| No. 9 Arizona State | 15 | – | 3 | .833 | 29 | – | 6 | .829 |
| No. 14 Stanford^{†} | 13 | – | 5 | .722 | 26 | – | 10 | .722 |
| No. 24 California | 13 | – | 5 | .722 | 23 | – | 10 | .697 |
| Washington | 11 | – | 7 | .611 | 23 | – | 10 | .697 |
| UCLA | 8 | – | 10 | .444 | 19 | – | 18 | .514 |
| Washington State | 7 | – | 11 | .389 | 17 | – | 15 | .531 |
| USC | 7 | – | 11 | .389 | 15 | – | 15 | .500 |
| Colorado | 6 | – | 12 | .333 | 15 | – | 17 | .469 |
| Oregon | 6 | – | 12 | .333 | 13 | – | 17 | .433 |
| Arizona | 3 | – | 15 | .167 | 10 | – | 20 | .333 |
| Utah | 3 | – | 15 | .167 | 9 | – | 22 | .290 |
† 2015 Pac-12 Tournament winner As of April 4, 2015; Rankings from AP Poll

The 2014–15 California Golden Bears women's basketball team represented University of California, Berkeley during the 2014–15 NCAA Division I women's basketball season. The Golden Bears, led by fourth-year head coach Lindsay Gottlieb, played their home games at the Haas Pavilion and were members of the Pac-12 Conference. They finished the season 24–10, 13–5 in Pac-12 play to finish in a tie for third place. They advanced to the championship game of the Pac-12 women's tournament, where they lost to their in-state rival Stanford. They received an at-large bid to the NCAA women's tournament, where they defeated Wichita State in the first round before being defeated by Texas in the second round.

== Roster ==
2014–15 California Golden Bears women's basketball team
Players
Coaches

| Pos. | # | Name | Height | Year | Previous school | Hometown |
|---|---|---|---|---|---|---|
| F | 3 | Mikayla Cowling | 6 ft 2 in (1.88 m) | Fr | Saint Mary's College | Benicia, CA |
| G | 10 | Mercedes Jefflo | 5 ft 10 in (1.78 m) | So | Centennial | Compton, CA |
| F | 12 | Penina Davidson | 6 ft 3 in (1.91 m) | Fr | Rangitoto College | Auckland, New Zealand |
| G | 15 | Brittany Boyd | 5 ft 9 in (1.75 m) | Sr | Berkeley | Berkeley, CA |
| F | 21 | Reshanda Gray | 6 ft 3 in (1.91 m) | Sr | Washington Prep | Los Angeles, CA |
| G | 23 | Brittany Shine | 5 ft 10 in (1.78 m) | RS Sr | Sacramento | Sacramento, CA |
| F | 24 | Courtney Range | 5 ft 3 in (1.6 m) | So | Manteca | Manteca, CA |
| G | 33 | Gabby Green | 6 ft 2 in (1.88 m) | Fr | Saint Mary's College | Oakland, CA |
| F | 40 | Justine Hartman | 6 ft 2 in (1.88 m) | Sr | Brea Olinda | Whittier, CA |
| F | 44 | KC Waters | 6 ft 2 in (1.88 m) | So | Bishop O'Dowd | San Ramon, CA |

Head coach

Lindsay Gottlieb

Assistant coach(es)

Charmin Smith
Jeff Cammon
Kai Felton

Legend

- (C) Team captain
- (S) Suspended
- (I) Ineligible
- (W) Walk-on
- Injured
- Current redshirt

Roster
Last update: 2014-11-25

== Rankings ==
Ranking movement Legend: ██ Increase in ranking. ██ Decrease in ranking. NR = Not ranked. RV = Received votes.
| Poll | Pre | Wk 2 | Wk 3 | Wk 4 | Wk 5 | Wk 6 | Wk 7 | Wk 8 | Wk 9 | Wk 10 | Wk 11 | Wk 12 | Wk 13 | Wk 14 | Wk 15 | Wk 16 | Wk 17 | Wk 18 | Final |
|---|---|---|---|---|---|---|---|---|---|---|---|---|---|---|---|---|---|---|---|
| AP | 15 | 14 | 14 | 10 | 18 | 24 | RV | RV | RV | RV | NR | NR | RV | RV | RV | 24 | RV | 25 | 24 |
| Coaches | 14 | 14 | 14 | 12 | 17 | 23 | RV | RV | RV | RV | NR | NR | RV | RV | RV | RV | RV | RV | RV |

== Schedule ==
| Date time, TV | Rank^{#} | Opponent^{#} | Result | Record | Site (attendance) city, state |
Exhibition
| 11/01/2014*; 2:00 pm | No. 15 | Vanguard | W 75–42 | – | Haas Pavilion (227); Berkeley, CA |
Non-conference regular season
| 11/16/2014*; 4:00 pm | No. 15 | at Pacific | W 84–64 | 1–0 | Alex G. Spanos Center (1,201); Stockton, CA |
| 11/18/2014*; 7:00 pm | No. 14 | Nevada | W 76–54 | 2–0 | Haas Pavilion (1,446); Berkeley, CA |
| 11/21/2014*; 10:00 pm | No. 14 | at Hawaiʻi; Hawai'i Tournament | W 79–72 | 3–0 | Stan Sheriff Center (1,828); Honolulu, HI |
| 11/23/2014*; 7:30 pm | No. 14 | vs. Missouri; Hawai'i Tournament | W 82–70 | 4–0 | Stan Sheriff Center (N/A); Honolulu, HI |
| 11/28/2014*; 5:30 pm | No. 14 | San Jose State; Cal Classic semifinals | W 110–87 | 5–0 | Haas Pavilion (2,309); Berkeley, CA |
| 11/29/2014*; 7:00 pm | No. 14 | Creighton; Cal Classic championship game | W 94–69 | 6–0 | Haas Pavilion (1,455); Berkeley, CA |
| 12/03/2014*; 11:00 am | No. 10 | Sacramento State | W 107–94 | 7–0 | Haas Pavilion (2,948); Berkeley, CA |
| 12/07/2014*; 3:00 pm, FS1 | No. 10 | at Kansas | L 39–62 | 7–1 | Allen Fieldhouse (2,355); Lawrence, KS |
| 12/13/2014*; 4:00 pm | No. 18 | at Long Beach State | L 56–58 ^{OT} | 7–2 | Walter Pyramid (1,086); Long Beach, CA |
| 12/21/2014*; 2:00 pm, P12N | No. 24 | No. 10 Louisville | L 57–70 | 7–3 | Haas Pavilion (8,339); Berkeley, CA |
| 12/29/2014*; 6:00 pm, P12N | | Old Dominion | W 79–59 | 8–3 | Haas Pavilion (1,576); Berkeley, CA |
Pac-12 regular season
| 01/03/2015; 3:00 pm, P12N | | Utah | W 67–49 | 9–3 (1–0) | Haas Pavilion (2,232); Berkeley, CA |
| 01/05/2015; 7:00 pm, P12N | | Colorado | W 75–59 | 10–3 (2–0) | Haas Pavilion (1,350); Berkeley, CA |
| 01/09/2015; 5:00 pm, P12N | | at Washington State | W 70–62 | 11–3 (3–0) | Beasley Coliseum (923); Pullman, WA |
| 01/11/2015; 3:00 pm, P12N | | at Washington | L 77–79 | 11–4 (3–1) | Alaska Airlines Arena (2,795); Seattle, WA |
| 01/16/2015; 6:00 pm, P12N | | No. 14 Arizona State | L 52–67 | 11–5 (3–2) | Haas Pavilion (2,042); Berkeley, CA |
| 01/18/2015; 1:00 pm, P12N | | Arizona | W 68–56 | 12–5 (4–2) | Haas Pavilion (2,569); Berkeley, CA |
| 01/23/2015; 7:00 pm | | at USC | W 67–53 | 13–5 (5–2) | Galen Center (423); Los Angeles, CA |
| 01/25/2015; 3:00 pm, P12N | | at UCLA | W 72–57 | 14–5 (6–2) | Pauley Pavilion (6,103); Los Angeles, CA |
| 01/31/2015; 2:30 pm, P12N | | Washington | W 82–58 | 15–5 (7–2) | Haas Pavilion (2,962); Berkeley, CA |
| 02/02/2015; 5:00 pm, P12N | | Washington State | W 57–54 | 16–5 (8–2) | Haas Pavilion (1,026); Berkeley, CA |
| 02/06/2015; 5:00 pm | | at Arizona | W 65–46 | 17–5 (9–2) | McKale Center (1,258); Tucson, AZ |
| 02/08/2015; 1:00 pm, ESPNU | | at No. 10 Arizona State | W 50–49 | 18–5 (10–2) | Wells Fargo Arena (2,150); Tempe, AZ |
| 02/12/2015; 8:00 pm, P12N | | UCLA | W 70–64 | 19–5 (11–2) | Haas Pavilion (2,013); Berkeley, CA |
| 02/15/2015; 6:30 pm, P12N | | USC | L 54–65 | 19–6 (11–3) | Haas Pavilion (2,841); Berkeley, CA |
| 02/18/2015; 7:00 pm, P12N | | No. 18 Stanford | L 47–59 | 19–7 (11–4) | Haas Pavilion (5,039); Berkeley, CA |
| 02/22/2015; 1:00 pm, ESPN2 | | at No. 18 Stanford | W 63–53 | 20–7 (12–4) | Maples Pavilion (5,209); Stanford, CA |
| 02/26/2015; 6:00 pm | No. 24 | at Oregon | W 74–59 | 21–7 (13–4) | Matthew Knight Arena (1,302); Eugene, OR |
| 02/28/2015; 3:00 pm, P12N | No. 24 | at No. 7 Oregon State | L 55–73 | 21–8 (13–5) | Gill Coliseum (6,238); Corvallis, OR |
Pac-12 Women's Tournament
| 03/06/2015; 8:30 pm, P12N | | vs. Washington; Quarterfinals | W 69–53 | 22–8 | KeyArena (5,545); Seattle, WA |
| 03/07/2015; 8:30 pm, P12N | | vs. Colorado; Semifinals | W 68–55 | 23–8 | KeyArena (6,059); Seattle, WA |
| 03/08/2015; 6:00 pm, ESPN | | vs. No. 19 Stanford; Championship Game | L 60–61 | 23–9 | KeyArena (4,864); Seattle, WA |
NCAA Women's Tournament
| 03/20/2015*; 4:45 pm, ESPN2 | No. 24 | Wichita State; First Round | W 78–66 | 24–9 | Haas Pavilion (2,079); Berkeley, CA |
| 03/22/2015*; 6:00 pm, ESPN2 | No. 24 | Texas; Second Round | L 70–73 | 24–10 | Haas Pavilion (2,852); Berkeley, CA |
*Non-conference game. ^{#}Rankings from AP Poll. (#) Tournament seedings in parentheses. All times are in Pacific Time.

== See also ==
- 2014–15 California Golden Bears men's basketball team
