= 2014–15 Stanford Cardinal women's basketball team =

Intercollegiate basketball season

2014–15 Stanford Cardinal women's basketball

Pac-12 Tournament champions

NCAA tournament, Sweet Sixteen
- Conference: Pac-12 Conference

Ranking
- Coaches: No. 17
- AP: No. 14
- Record: 26–10 (13–5 Pac-12)
- Head coach: Tara VanDerveer (29th season)
- Assistant coaches: Amy Tucker; Kate Paye; Tempie Brown
- Home arena: Maples Pavilion

2014–15 Pac-12 Conference women's basketball standings
	Conf.				Overall
Team	W		L	PCT	W		L	PCT
No. 10 Oregon State	16	–	2	.889	27	–	5	.844
No. 9 Arizona State	15	–	3	.833	29	–	6	.829
No. 14 Stanford^{†}	13	–	5	.722	26	–	10	.722
No. 24 California	13	–	5	.722	23	–	10	.697
Washington	11	–	7	.611	23	–	10	.697
UCLA	8	–	10	.444	19	–	18	.514
Washington State	7	–	11	.389	17	–	15	.531
USC	7	–	11	.389	15	–	15	.500
Colorado	6	–	12	.333	15	–	17	.469
Oregon	6	–	12	.333	13	–	17	.433
Arizona	3	–	15	.167	10	–	20	.333
Utah	3	–	15	.167	9	–	22	.290
† 2015 Pac-12 Tournament winner As of April 4, 2015; Rankings from AP Poll

The 2014–15 Stanford Cardinal women's basketball team represented Stanford University during the 2014–15 NCAA Division I women's basketball season. The Cardinal, led by 29th-year head coach Tara VanDerveer, played their home games at the Maples Pavilion and were members of the Pac-12 Conference. They finished the season 26–10, 13–5 in Pac-12 play to finish in a tie for third place. They won the Pac-12 women's tournament to earn an automatic trip to the NCAA women's tournament, where they defeated Cal State Northridge in the first round, and Oklahoma in the second round, before losing to Notre Dame in the sweet sixteen.

== Previous season ==
The Stanford Cardinal finished the 2013-14 season with an overall record of 33–4, with a record of 17–1 in the Pac-12 regular season to win their 24th Pac-12 regular season title. In the 2014 Pac-12 Tournament, the Cardinal were defeated by USC 72–68 in the semifinals. They were invited to the 2014 NCAA Division I women's basketball tournament, making their 27th straight appearance. They lost in the final to the 2014 NCAA Division I women's basketball tournament champion Connecticut, 75–56.

== Off season ==
=== Departures ===
Name	Number	Pos.	Height	Year	Hometown	Reason for departure
Mikaela Ruef	3	F	6'3"	RS senior	Beavercreek, OH	Graduated/2014 WNBA draft
Chiney Ogwumike	13	F	6'4"	Senior	Cypress, TX	Graduated/2014 WNBA draft
Sara James	21	G	5'10"	Senior	El Dorado Hills, CA	Graduated

=== 2014 recruiting class ===
College recruiting
Name	Hometown	School	Height	Weight	Commit date
Taylor Rooks; W	Warren, New Jersey	Gill St. Bernard's School	6 ft 0 in (1.83 m)	N/A	
Taylor Rooks; W	Recruit ratings: (98)				
Brittany McPhee; W	Normandy Park, Washington	Mount Rainier High School	5 ft 11 in (1.80 m)	N/A	
Brittany McPhee; W	Recruit ratings: (97)				
Kaylee Johnson; F	Casper, Wyoming	Natrona County High School	6 ft 3 in (1.91 m)	N/A	
Kaylee Johnson; F	Recruit ratings: (97)				
Overall recruit ranking:
Note: In many cases, Scout, Rivals, 247Sports, On3, and ESPN may conflict in their listings of height and weight.; In these cases, the average was taken. ESPN grades are on a 100-point scale.; Sources:

== Roster ==
2014–15 Stanford Cardinal women's basketball team
Players
Coaches

Pos.	#	Name	Height	Year	Previous school	Hometown
G	00	Alex Green	5 ft 6 in (1.68 m)	RS Jr	Bishop Lynch	Dallas, TX
G	1	Lili Thompson	5 ft 7 in (1.7 m)	So	Timberview	Mansfield, TX
F	4	Taylor Greenfield	6 ft 3 in (1.91 m)	Sr	Ballard Community	Huxley, IA
F	5	Kaylee Johnson	6 ft 3 in (1.91 m)	Fr	Natrona County	Casper, WY
G	10	Briana Roberson	5 ft 7 in (1.7 m)	So	Troy	Fullerton, CA
G	12	Brittany McPhee	6 ft 0 in (1.83 m)	Fr	Mount Rainier	Normandy Park, WA
G	23	Jasmine Camp	5 ft 7 in (1.7 m)	RS Jr	Chamblee	Ellenwood, GA
F	24	Erica McCall	6 ft 3 in (1.91 m)	So	Ridgeview	Bakersfield, CA
F	25	Erica Payne	6 ft 2 in (1.88 m)	Sr	Carondelet	Concord, CA
G	31	Taylor Rooks	6 ft 0 in (1.83 m)	Fr	Gill St. Bernard's	Warren, NJ
F	32	Kailee Johnson	6 ft 3 in (1.91 m)	So	Central Catholic	Portland, OR
G	33	Amber Orrange	5 ft 7 in (1.7 m)	Sr	Westbury Christian	Houston, TX
F/C	34	Tess Picknell	6 ft 5 in (1.96 m)	Jr	South Medford	Medford, OR
F	41	Bonnie Samuelson	6 ft 3 in (1.91 m)	Sr	Edison	Huntington Beach, CA
F	44	Karlie Samuelson	5 ft 11 in (1.8 m)	So	Mater Dei	Huntington Beach, CA

Head coach

Tara VanDerveer

Assistant coach(es)

Amy Tucker
Kate Paye
Tempie Brown

Legend

- (C) Team captain
- (S) Suspended
- (I) Ineligible
- (W) Walk-on
- Injured
- Current redshirt

Roster

== Schedule ==
Date time, TV	Rank^{#}	Opponent^{#}	Result	Record	Site (attendance) city, state
Exhibition
11/02/2014*; 2:00 pm	No. 6	Vanguard	W 105–50	–	Maples Pavilion (2,605); Stanford, CA
11/08/2014*; 2:00 pm	No. 6	UC San Diego	W 74–51	–	Maples Pavilion (2,072); Stanford, CA
Non-conference regular season
11/14/2014*; 5:30 pm	No. 6	Boston College	W 96–63	1–0	Maples Pavilion (3,278); Stanford, CA
11/17/2014*; 6:00 pm, ESPN2	No. 6	No. 1 Connecticut; Rivalry	W 88–86 ^{OT}	2–0	Maples Pavilion (5,367); Stanford, CA
11/20/2014*; 6:00 pm, P12N	No. 6	No. 10 Texas	L 81–87 ^{OT}	2–1	Maples Pavilion (3,674); Stanford, CA
11/24/2014*; 6:00 pm	No. 5	at New Mexico	W 70–65	3–1	The Pit (6,594); Albuquerque, NM
11/28/2014*; 4:00 pm	No. 5	vs. No. 11 North Carolina; Rainbow Wahine Shootout	L 54–70	3–2	Stan Sheriff Center (N/A); Honolulu, HI
11/29/2014*; 6:30 pm	No. 5	at Hawaiʻi; Rainbow Wahine Shootout	W 86–73	4–2	Stan Sheriff Center (2,589); Honolulu, HI
11/30/2014*; 4:00 pm	No. 5	vs. Prairie View A&M; Rainbow Wahine Shootout	W 88–45	5–2	Stan Sheriff Center (N/A); Honolulu, HI
12/14/2014*; 7:00 pm, P12N	No. 7	Santa Clara	W 82–43	6–2	Maples Pavilion (3,527); Stanford, CA
12/17/2014*; 3:00 pm	No. 7	at Chattanooga	L 46–54	6–3	McKenzie Arena (2,128); Chattanooga, TN
12/20/2014*; 10:00 am, SECN	No. 7	at No. 11 Tennessee; Rivalry	L 40–59	6–4	Thompson–Boling Arena (13,056); Knoxville, TN
12/22/2014*; 2:00 pm	No. 16	UC Davis	W 71–59	7–4	Maples Pavilion (3,375); Stanford, CA
12/28/2014*; 2:00 pm	No. 16	UC Santa Barbara	W 90–34	8–4	Maples Pavilion (4,041); Stanford, CA
Pac-12 regular season
01/03/2015; 7:00 pm, P12N	No. 15	Colorado	W 62–55	9–4 (1–0)	Maples Pavilion (3,507); Stanford, CA
01/05/2015; 5:00 pm, P12N	No. 15	Utah	W 55–44	10–4 (2–0)	Maples Pavilion (2,782); Stanford, CA
01/09/2015; 7:00 pm, P12N	No. 15	at Washington	W 60–56	11–4 (3–0)	Alaska Airlines Arena (2,677); Seattle, WA
01/11/2015; 1:00 pm, P12N	No. 15	at Washington State	W 86–76 ^{OT}	12–4 (4–0)	Beasley Coliseum (1,098); Pullman, WA
01/16/2015; 8:00 pm, P12N	No. 13	Arizona	W 77–47	13–4 (5–0)	Maples Pavilion (3,419); Stanford, CA
01/19/2015; 3:00 pm, P12N	No. 11	No. 13 Arizona State	L 57–60	13–5 (5–1)	Maples Pavilion (3,546); Stanford, CA
01/23/2015; 7:00 pm, P12N	No. 11	at UCLA	W 79–70	14–5 (6–1)	Pauley Pavilion (1,837); Los Angeles, CA
01/25/2015; 5:00 pm, P12N	No. 11	at USC	W 71–60	15–5 (7–1)	Galen Center (1,312); Los Angeles, CA
01/31/2015; 12:30 pm, P12N	No. 12	Washington State	W 75–56	16–5 (8–1)	Maples Pavilion (3,118); Stanford, CA
02/02/2015; 7:00 pm, P12N	No. 12	Washington	W 82–69	17–5 (9–1)	Maples Pavilion (2,885); Stanford, CA
02/06/2015; 7:00 pm, P12N	No. 12	at No. 10 Arizona State	L 52–53	17–6 (9–2)	Wells Fargo Arena (3,339); Tempe, AZ
02/08/2015; 2:00 pm, P12N	No. 12	at Arizona	L 57–60	17–7 (9–3)	McKale Center (1,359); Tucson, AZ
02/13/2015; 6:00 pm, P12N	No. 19	USC	W 79–60	18–7 (10–3)	Maples Pavilion (3,403); Stanford, CA
02/15/2015; 4:30 pm, P12N	No. 19	UCLA	W 68–50	19–7 (11–3)	Maples Pavilion (4,270); Stanford, CA
02/18/2015; 7:00 pm, P12N	No. 18	at California	W 59–47	20–7 (12–3)	Haas Pavilion (5,039); Berkeley, CA
02/22/2015; 1:00 pm, ESPN2	No. 18	California	L 53–63	20–8 (12–4)	Maples Pavilion (5,209); Stanford, CA
02/26/2015; 6:00 pm, P12N	No. 19	at No. 7 Oregon State	W 69–58	21–8 (13–4)	Gill Coliseum (6,157); Corvallis, OR
03/01/2015; 1:00 pm, ESPNU	No. 19	at Oregon	L 55–62	21–9 (13–5)	Matthew Knight Arena (1,949); Eugene, OR
Pac-12 Women's Tournament
03/06/2015; 2:00 pm, P12N	No. 19	vs. UCLA; Quarterfinals	W 67–62	22–9	KeyArena (3,869); Seattle, WA
03/07/2015; 6:00 pm, P12N	No. 19	vs. No. 9 Arizona State; Semifinals	W 59–56	23–9	KeyArena (N/A); Seattle, WA
03/08/2015; 6:00 pm, ESPN	No. 19	vs. California; Championship Game	W 61–60	24–9	KeyArena (4,864); Seattle, WA
NCAA Women's Tournament
03/21/2015*; 3:41 pm, ESPN2	No. 14	Cal State Northridge; First Round	W 73–60	25–9	Maples Pavilion (N/A); Stanford, CA
03/23/2015*; 3:30 pm, ESPN2	No. 14	Oklahoma; Second Round	W 86–76	26–9	Maples Pavilion (2,532); Stanford, CA
03/27/2015*; 7:00 pm, ESPN	No. 14	vs. No. 2 Notre Dame; Sweet Sixteen	L 60–81	26–10	Chesapeake Energy Arena (3,878); Oklahoma City, OK
*Non-conference game. ^{#}Rankings from AP Poll. (#) Tournament seedings in parentheses. All times are in Pacific Time.

== Rankings ==
Ranking movement Legend: ██ Increase in ranking. ██ Decrease in ranking. NR = Not ranked. RV = Received votes.
Poll	Pre	Wk 2	Wk 3	Wk 4	Wk 5	Wk 6	Wk 7	Wk 8	Wk 9	Wk 10	Wk 11	Wk 12	Wk 13	Wk 14	Wk 15	Wk 16	Wk 17	Wk 18	Final
AP	6	6	5	8	7	7	16	15	15	13	11	12т	12	19	18	19	19	14	14
Coaches	6	1	4	9	7	7	15	15	14	13	16	15	14	19	19	19т	20	17	17

== See also ==
- 2014–15 Stanford Cardinal men's basketball team
