= 2014–15 Oregon State Beavers women's basketball team =

Intercollegiate basketball season

2014–15 Oregon State Beavers women's basketball

Pac-12 Regular Season Champions

NCAA Women's Tournament, second round
- Conference: Pac-12 Conference

Ranking
- Coaches: No. 10
- AP: No. 10
- Record: 27–5 (16–2 Pac-12)
- Head coach: Scott Rueck (5th season)
- Associate head coach: Jonas Chatterton
- Assistant coaches: Eric Ely; Mandy Close
- Home arena: Gill Coliseum

2014–15 Pac-12 Conference women's basketball standings
	Conf.				Overall
Team	W		L	PCT	W		L	PCT
No. 10 Oregon State	16	–	2	.889	27	–	5	.844
No. 9 Arizona State	15	–	3	.833	29	–	6	.829
No. 14 Stanford^{†}	13	–	5	.722	26	–	10	.722
No. 24 California	13	–	5	.722	23	–	10	.697
Washington	11	–	7	.611	23	–	10	.697
UCLA	8	–	10	.444	19	–	18	.514
Washington State	7	–	11	.389	17	–	15	.531
USC	7	–	11	.389	15	–	15	.500
Colorado	6	–	12	.333	15	–	17	.469
Oregon	6	–	12	.333	13	–	17	.433
Arizona	3	–	15	.167	10	–	20	.333
Utah	3	–	15	.167	9	–	22	.290
† 2015 Pac-12 Tournament winner As of April 4, 2015; Rankings from AP Poll

The 2014–15 Oregon State Beavers women's basketball team represented Oregon State University during the 2014–15 NCAA Division I women's basketball season. The Beavers, led by fifth-year head coach Scott Rueck, played their games at the Gill Coliseum and were members of the Pac-12 Conference. They finished the season 27–5, 16–2 in Pac-12 play to win the Pac-12 regular season title. They lost in the quarterfinals of the Pac-12 women's tournament to Colorado. They received an at-large bid to the NCAA women's tournament, where they defeated South Dakota State in the first round before being upset by Gonzaga in the second round.

== Roster ==
2014–15 Oregon State Beavers women's basketball team
Players
Coaches

Pos.	#	Name	Height	Year	Previous school	Hometown
F/C	4	Breanna Brown	6 ft 3 in (1.91 m)	So	Bishop O'Dowd HS	Oakland, CA
F	5	Samantha Siegner	6 ft 3 in (1.91 m)	Jr	West Albany HS	Albany, OR
G	11	Gabriella Henson	5 ft 11 in (1.8 m)	So	Troy HS	Anaheim, CA
F	12	Kolbie Orum	6 ft 3 in (1.91 m)	So	Maple Ridge Secondary	Maple Ridge, BC
G	14	Allison Gibson	5 ft 11 in (1.8 m)	Sr	St. Mary's HS	Woodbridge, CA
G	15	Jamie Weisner	5 ft 10 in (1.78 m)	Jr	Clarkston HS	Clarkston, WA
C	21	Marie Gülich	6 ft 5 in (1.96 m)	Fr	Landrat-Lucas Gymnasium	Cologne, Germany
G	22	Jen'Von'Ta Hill	5 ft 8 in (1.73 m)	Jr	Hutchinson CC; Skyline HS	St. Paul, MN
G	23	Alex Kalmbach	5 ft 9 in (1.75 m)	Fr	Bishop O'Dowd HS	Oakland, CA
G	24	Sydney Wiese	6 ft 0 in (1.83 m)	So	Pinnacle HS	Phoenix, AZ
F	32	Deven Hunter	6 ft 3 in (1.91 m)	Jr	McNary HS	Keizer, OR
C	44	Ruth Hamblin	6 ft 6 in (1.98 m)	Jr	Houston Christian School	Houston, BC

Head coach

- Scott Rueck

Assistant coach(es)

- Jonas Chatterton
- Eric Ely
- Mandy Close

Legend

- (C) Team captain
- (S) Suspended
- (I) Ineligible
- (W) Walk-on
- Injured
- Current redshirt

Roster

== Rankings ==
Ranking movement Legend: ██ Increase in ranking. ██ Decrease in ranking. NR = Not ranked. RV = Received votes.
Poll	Pre	Wk 2	Wk 3	Wk 4	Wk 5	Wk 6	Wk 7	Wk 8	Wk 9	Wk 10	Wk 11	Wk 12	Wk 13	Wk 14	Wk 15	Wk 16	Wk 17	Wk 18	Final
AP	20	20	19	17	15	16	10т	13	11	9	9	7	7	8	7	7	8	10	10
Coaches	21	21	20	18	14	14	12	13	13	9	8	7	7	9	8	7	9	10	10

== Schedule ==
Date time, TV	Rank^{#}	Opponent^{#}	Result	Record	Site (attendance) city, state
Exhibition
11/09/2014*; 2:00 pm	No. 20	Western Oregon	W 98–38	–	Gill Coliseum (1,625); Corvallis, OR
Non-conference regular season
11/14/2014*; 4:00 pm	No. 20	Portland	W 87–65	1–0	Gill Coliseum (2,024); Corvallis, OR
11/16/2014*; 2:00 pm	No. 20	Utah State	W 85–62	2–0	Gill Coliseum (1,762); Corvallis, OR
11/22/2014*; 2:00 pm	No. 20	Concordia (Oregon)	W 92–35	3–0	Gill Coliseum (1,749); Corvallis, OR
11/27/2014*; 6:00 pm	No. 19	vs. Butler; Tom Westin Invitational	W 85–53	4–0	George Q. Cannon Activities Center (193); Laie, HI
11/29/2014*; 4:00 pm	No. 19	vs. BYU; Tom Westin Invitational	W 71–61	5–0	George Q. Cannon Activities Center (N/A); Laie, HI
12/04/2014*; 11:00 am	No. 17	Idaho	W 75–53	6–0	Gill Coliseum (7,537); Corvallis, OR
12/06/2014*; 2:00 pm	No. 17	Sacramento State	W 109–61	7–0	Gill Coliseum (2,204); Corvallis, OR
12/16/2014*; 3:00 pm, ESPN3	No. 16	at No. 6 North Carolina	W 70–55	8–0	Carmichael Arena (1,809); Chapel Hill, NC
12/19/2014*; 6:00 pm	No. 16	vs. Southern Illinois; New Orleans Shootout	W 71–55	9–0	Lakefront Arena (375); New Orleans, LA
12/20/2014*; 3:30 pm	No. 16	vs. Nevada; New Orleans Shootout	W 73–50	10–0	Lakefront Arena (365); New Orleans, LA
12/28/2014*; 10:00 am, SECN	No. 10	at No. 8 Tennessee	L 63–74	10–1	Thompson–Boling Arena (11,123); Knoxville, TN
Pac-12 regular season
01/03/2015; 5:00 pm, P12N	No. 13	at UCLA	W 65–47	11–1 (1–0)	Pauley Pavilion (1,498); Los Angeles, CA
01/05/2015; 7:00 pm, P12N	No. 11	at USC	W 76–66	12–1 (2–0)	Galen Center (302); Los Angeles, CA
01/09/2015; 7:00 pm, P12N	No. 11	Oregon; Civil War	W 70–37	13–1 (3–0)	Gill Coliseum (7,652); Corvallis, OR
01/11/2015; 5:00 pm, P12N	No. 11	at Oregon; Civil War	W 77–48	14–1 (4–0)	Matthew Knight Arena (2,106); Eugene, OR
01/16/2015; 6:00 pm, P12N	No. 9	Washington State	W 73–70	15–1 (5–0)	Gill Coliseum (3,087); Corvallis, OR
01/19/2015; 5:00 pm, P12N	No. 9	Washington	W 75–67	16–1 (6–0)	Gill Coliseum (3,262); Corvallis, OR
01/23/2015; 7:00 pm, P12N	No. 9	at Arizona	W 73–55	17–1 (7–0)	McKale Center (1,127); Tucson, AZ
01/25/2015; 1:00 pm, P12N	No. 9	at No. 13 Arizona State	W 68–57	18–1 (8–0)	Wells Fargo Arena (2,946); Tempe, AZ
01/31/2015; 2:30 pm, P12N	No. 7	USC	W 68–35	19–1 (9–0)	Gill Coliseum (4,511); Corvallis, OR
02/02/2015; 7:00 pm, P12N	No. 7	UCLA	W 82–64	20–1 (10–0)	Gill Coliseum (2,636); Corvallis, OR
02/06/2015; 6:00 pm, P12N	No. 7	at Washington	L 67–76	20–2 (10–1)	Alaska Airlines Arena (2,510); Seattle, WA
02/08/2015; 2:00 pm, P12N	No. 7	at Washington State	W 61–56	21–2 (11–1)	Beasley Coliseum (1,102); Pullman, WA
02/13/2015; 6:00 pm, P12N	No. 8	No. 12 Arizona State	W 70–64	22–2 (12–1)	Gill Coliseum (5,242); Corvallis, OR
02/15/2015; 11:00 am, P12N	No. 8	Arizona	W 73–48	23–2 (13–1)	Gill Coliseum (4,284); Corvallis, OR
02/20/2015; 5:30 pm, P12N	No. 7	at Colorado	W 66–44	24–2 (14–1)	Coors Events Center (2,694); Boulder, CO
02/22/2015; 11:00 am, P12N	No. 7	at Utah	W 52–42	25–2 (15–1)	Jon M. Huntsman Center (788); Salt Lake City, UT
02/26/2015; 6:00 pm, P12N	No. 7	No. 19 Stanford	L 58–69	25–3 (15–2)	Gill Coliseum (6,157); Corvallis, OR
02/28/2015; 3:00 pm, P12N	No. 7	No. 24 California	W 73–55	26–3 (16–2)	Gill Coliseum (6,238); Corvallis, OR
Pac-12 Women's Tournament
03/06/2014; 6:00 pm, P12N	No. 8	vs. Colorado; Quarterfinals	L 65–68	26–4	KeyArena (N/A); Seattle, WA
NCAA Women's Tournament
03/20/2015*; 2:00 pm, ESPN2	No. 10	South Dakota State; First Round	W 74–62	27–4	Gill Coliseum (3,706); Corvallis, OR
03/22/2015*; 4:00 pm, ESPN2	No. 10	Gonzaga; Second Round	L 64–76	27–5	Gill Coliseum (5,071); Corvallis, OR
*Non-conference game. ^{#}Rankings from AP Poll. (#) Tournament seedings in parentheses. All times are in Pacific Time.

== See also ==
- 2014–15 Oregon State Beavers men's basketball team
