= 2014–15 Colorado Buffaloes women's basketball team =

Intercollegiate basketball season

2014–15 Colorado Buffaloes women's basketball

Omni Hotels Classic Champions
- Conference: Pac-12 Conference
- Record: 15–17 (6–12 Pac-12)
- Head coach: Linda Lappe (5th season)
- Assistant coaches: Jenni Benningfield; Jamie Carey; Kelly Rae Finley
- Home arena: Coors Events Center

2014–15 Pac-12 Conference women's basketball standings
| | Conf. | | | | Overall |
| Team | W | | L | PCT | W | | L | PCT |
|---|---|---|---|---|---|---|---|---|
| No. 10 Oregon State | 16 | – | 2 | .889 | 27 | – | 5 | .844 |
| No. 9 Arizona State | 15 | – | 3 | .833 | 29 | – | 6 | .829 |
| No. 14 Stanford^{†} | 13 | – | 5 | .722 | 26 | – | 10 | .722 |
| No. 24 California | 13 | – | 5 | .722 | 23 | – | 10 | .697 |
| Washington | 11 | – | 7 | .611 | 23 | – | 10 | .697 |
| UCLA | 8 | – | 10 | .444 | 19 | – | 18 | .514 |
| Washington State | 7 | – | 11 | .389 | 17 | – | 15 | .531 |
| USC | 7 | – | 11 | .389 | 15 | – | 15 | .500 |
| Colorado | 6 | – | 12 | .333 | 15 | – | 17 | .469 |
| Oregon | 6 | – | 12 | .333 | 13 | – | 17 | .433 |
| Arizona | 3 | – | 15 | .167 | 10 | – | 20 | .333 |
| Utah | 3 | – | 15 | .167 | 9 | – | 22 | .290 |
† 2015 Pac-12 Tournament winner As of April 4, 2015; Rankings from AP Poll

The 2014–15 Colorado Buffaloes women's basketball team represented University of Colorado Boulder during the 2014–15 NCAA Division I women's basketball season. The Buffaloes, led by fifth-year head coach Linda Lappe, played their home games at the Coors Events Center and were members of the Pac-12 Conference. They finished the season 15–17, 6–12 in Pac-12 play to finish in a tie for ninth place. They advanced to the semifinals of the Pac-12 women's tournament, where they lost to California.

== Roster ==
2014–15 Colorado Buffaloes women's basketball team
Players
Coaches

| Pos. | # | Name | Height | Year | Previous school | Hometown |
|---|---|---|---|---|---|---|
| G | 1 | Lexy Kresel | 5 ft 11 in (1.8 m) | Sr | Shadow Mountain | Paradise Valley, AZ |
| C | 3 | Bri Watts | 6 ft 2 in (1.88 m) | So | Clovis West | Fresno, CA |
| G | 4 | Desiree Harris | 5 ft 8 in (1.73 m) | So | St. Joseph Notre Dame | Oakland, CA |
| G | 13 | Brecca Thomas | 5 ft 5 in (1.65 m) | Fr | The Kinkaid School | Stafford, TX |
| C | 15 | Zoe Correal | 6 ft 4 in (1.93 m) | Fr | Salesian | San Francisco, CA |
| G/F | 20 | Alina Hartman | 6 ft 0 in (1.83 m) | Fr | Kaiser-Heinrich-Gymnasium | Bamberg, Germany |
| G | 21 | Jasmine Sborov | 5 ft 11 in (1.8 m) | Sr | Round Rock | Round Rock, TX |
| G/F | 22 | Haley Smith | 6 ft 1 in (1.85 m) | So | Skyline | Sammamish, WA |
| G/F | 24 | Lauren Huggins | 6 ft 2 in (1.88 m) | So | Heritage | Littleton, CO |
| F | 31 | Zoe Beard-Fails | 6 ft 1 in (1.85 m) | So | Georgetown Day School | Herndon, VA |
| F | 32 | Arielle Roberson | 6 ft 1 in (1.85 m) | Jr | Wagner | San Antonio, TX |
| F | 34 | Jen Reese | 6 ft 2 in (1.88 m) | Sr | Clackamas | Clackamas, OR |
| F | 50 | Jamee Swan | 6 ft 2 in (1.88 m) | Jr | Marana | Marana, AZ |

Head coach

Linda Lappe

Assistant coach(es)

Jenni Benningfield
Jamie Carey
Kelly Rae Finley

Legend

- (C) Team captain
- (S) Suspended
- (I) Ineligible
- (W) Walk-on
- Injured
- Current redshirt

Roster

== Schedule ==
| Date time, TV | Rank^{#} | Opponent^{#} | Result | Record | Site (attendance) city, state |
Exhibition
| 11/08/2014*; 6:00 pm | | CSU–Pueblo | W 90–57 | – | Coors Events Center (582); Boulder, CO |
Regular season
| 11/15/2014*; 6:00 pm | | North Dakota; Preseason WNIT First Round | W 68–59 | 1–0 | Coors Events Center (1,875); Boulder, CO |
| 11/17/2014*; 7:00 pm | | WKU; Preseason WNIT Second Round | L 78–79 ^{OT} | 1–1 | Coors Events Center (1,550); Boulder, CO |
| 11/22/2014*; 6:00 pm | | Arkansas State; Preseason WNIT Consolation round | W 80–69 | 2–1 | Coors Events Center (619); Boulder, CO |
| 11/25/2014*; 7:00 pm, RTRM | | at Denver | W 77–49 | 3–1 | Magness Arena (674); Denver, CO |
| 11/28/2014*; 7:30 pm | | Missouri State; Omni Hotels Classic semifinals | W 87–59 | 4–1 | Coors Events Center (2,190); Boulder, CO |
| 11/29/2014*; 7:30 pm | | Colorado State; Omni Hotels Classic championship game | W 87–81 ^{2OT} | 5–1 | Coors Events Center (2,284); Boulder, CO |
| 12/05/2014*; 11:00 am | | San Jose State | W 97–89 ^{OT} | 6–1 | Coors Events Center (1,903); Boulder, CO |
| 12/07/2014*; 1:00 pm | | at No. 22 Iowa | L 63–78 | 6–2 | Carver–Hawkeye Arena (6,061); Iowa City, IA |
| 12/12/2014*; 6:00 pm | | at Missouri | L 50–53 | 6–3 | Mizzou Arena (1,615); Columbia, MO |
| 12/21/2014*; 2:00 pm | | Wyoming | W 76–71 | 7–3 | Coors Events Center (2,371); Boulder, CO |
| 12/30/2014*; 7:00 pm | | Long Beach State | L 56–62 | 7–4 | Coors Events Center (1,747); Boulder, CO |
| 01/03/2015; 8:00 pm, P12N | | at No. 15 Stanford | L 55–62 | 7–5 (0–1) | Maples Pavilion (3,507); Stanford, CA |
| 01/05/2015; 8:00 pm, P12N | | at California | L 59–75 | 7–6 (0–2) | Haas Pavilion (1,350); Berkeley, CA |
| 01/09/2015; 8:00 pm, P12N | | USC | L 61–81 | 7–7 (0–3) | Coors Events Center (1,701); Boulder, CO |
| 01/11/2015; 2:00 pm, P12N | | UCLA | L 84–90 | 7–8 (0–4) | Coors Events Center (2,190); Boulder, CO |
| 01/14/2015; 7:00 pm, P12N | | Utah | W 77–72 ^{OT} | 8–8 (1–4) | Coors Events Center (1,652); Boulder, CO |
| 01/18/2015; 2:00 pm, P12N | | at Utah | W 73–54 | 9–8 (2–4) | Jon M. Huntsman Center (523); Salt Lake City, UT |
| 01/23/2015; 8:00 pm, P12N | | at Washington | L 82–85 | 9–9 (2–5) | Alaska Airlines Arena (1,753); Seattle, WA |
| 01/25/2015; 2:00 pm, P12N | | at Washington State | L 68–73 | 9–10 (2–6) | Beasley Coliseum (887); Pullman, WA |
| 01/30/2015; 7:00 pm | | No. 11 Arizona State | L 60–68 | 9–11 (2–7) | Coors Events Center (3,954); Boulder, CO |
| 02/01/2015; 11:00 am, P12N | | Arizona | W 81–69 | 10–11 (3–7) | Coors Events Center (1,863); Boulder, CO |
| 02/06/2015; 8:00 pm | | at UCLA | L 65–72 | 10–12 (3–8) | Pauley Pavilion (1,134); Los Angeles, CA |
| 02/08/2015; 1:00 pm, P12N | | at USC | L 51–66 | 10–13 (3–9) | Galen Center (752); Los Angeles, CA |
| 02/13/2015; 7:00 pm | | Washington State | W 72–51 | 11–13 (4–9) | Coors Events Center (2,055); Boulder, CO |
| 02/15/2015; 5:30 pm | | Washington | L 67–79 | 11–14 (4–10) | Coors Events Center (2,029); Boulder, CO |
| 02/20/2015; 6:30 pm, P12N | | Oregon State | L 44–66 | 11–15 (4–11) | Coors Events Center (2,694); Boulder, CO |
| 02/22/2015; 2:00 pm | | Oregon | W 84–69 | 12–15 (5–11) | Coors Events Center (3,668); Boulder, CO |
| 02/27/2015; 6:00 pm, P12N | | at Arizona | W 66–51 | 13–15 (6–11) | McKale Center (1,279); Tucson, AZ |
| 03/01/2015; 2:00 pm | | at No. 10 Arizona State | L 46–59 | 13–16 (6–12) | Wells Fargo Arena (2,021); Tempe, AZ |
Pac-12 Conference Women's Tournament
| 03/05/2015; 7:00 pm, P12N | | vs. USC; First Round | W 75–63 | 14–16 | KeyArena (N/A); Seattle, WA |
| 03/06/2015; 7:00 pm, P12N | | vs. No. 8 Oregon State; Quarterfinals | W 68–65 | 15–16 | KeyArena (N/A); Seattle, WA |
| 03/07/2015; 9:30 pm, P12N | | vs. California; Semifinals | L 55–68 | 15–17 | KeyArena (6,059); Seattle, WA |
*Non-conference game. ^{#}Rankings from AP Poll. (#) Tournament seedings in parentheses. All times are in Mountain Time.

== See also ==
- 2014–15 Colorado Buffaloes men's basketball team
