= 2014–15 Arizona Wildcats women's basketball team =

Intercollegiate basketball season

2014–15 Arizona Wildcats women's basketball
- Conference: Pac-12 Conference
- Record: 10–20 (3–15 Pac-12)
- Head coach: Niya Butts (7th season)
- Assistant coaches: E.C. Hill; Sean LeBeauf; Calamity McEntire
- Home arena: McKale Center

2014–15 Pac-12 Conference women's basketball standings
	Conf.				Overall
Team	W		L	PCT	W		L	PCT
No. 10 Oregon State	16	–	2	.889	27	–	5	.844
No. 9 Arizona State	15	–	3	.833	29	–	6	.829
No. 14 Stanford^{†}	13	–	5	.722	26	–	10	.722
No. 24 California	13	–	5	.722	23	–	10	.697
Washington	11	–	7	.611	23	–	10	.697
UCLA	8	–	10	.444	19	–	18	.514
Washington State	7	–	11	.389	17	–	15	.531
USC	7	–	11	.389	15	–	15	.500
Colorado	6	–	12	.333	15	–	17	.469
Oregon	6	–	12	.333	13	–	17	.433
Arizona	3	–	15	.167	10	–	20	.333
Utah	3	–	15	.167	9	–	22	.290
† 2015 Pac-12 Tournament winner As of April 4, 2015; Rankings from AP Poll

The 2014–15 Arizona Wildcats women's basketball team represented University of Arizona during the 2014–15 NCAA Division I women's basketball season. The Wildcats, led by seventh-year head coach Niya Butts, played their games at the McKale Center and were members of the Pac-12 Conference. They finished the season 10–20, 3–15 in Pac-12 play to finish in a tie for eleventh place. They lost in the first round of the Pac-12 women's tournament to UCLA.

== Roster ==
2014–15 Arizona Wildcats women's basketball team
Players
Coaches

Pos.	#	Name	Height	Year	Previous school	Hometown
F	0	Breanna Workman	6 ft 1 in (1.85 m)	So	Centennial HS	Las Vegas, NV
G	1	Candice Worthen	5 ft 5 in (1.65 m)	RS Sr	Warren County HS	Warrenton, GA
G	3	Taryn Griffey	5 ft 7 in (1.7 m)	Fr	Dr. Phillips HS	Seattle, WA
G	4	Chy Cunningham	5 ft 10 in (1.78 m)	Jr	Tupelo HS	Tupelo, MS
G	10	Lauren Evans	5 ft 11 in (1.8 m)	Jr	Hamilton HS	Phoenix, AZ
G	11	Cherice Harris	5 ft 8 in (1.73 m)	Fr	Etiwanda HS	Rancho Cucamonga, CA
G	14	Malena Washington	5 ft 6 in (1.68 m)	So	Central HS	Beaumont, TX
G	15	Keyahndra Cannon	5 ft 9 in (1.75 m)	Jr	Mission Bay HS	San Diego, CA
G	20	Farrin Bell	6 ft 0 in (1.83 m)	RS So	Richardson HS	Richardson, TX
F	24	LaBrittney Jones	6 ft 1 in (1.85 m)	So	Cedar Hill HS	Cedar Hill, TX
F	30	Alli Gloyd	6 ft 1 in (1.85 m)	RS Sr	South Mountain HS	Phoenix, AZ
F	31	Dejza James	6 ft 1 in (1.85 m)	RS Fr	Pleasant Grove HS	Elk Grove, CA
G	33	JaLea Bennett	6 ft 0 in (1.83 m)	Fr	Mansfield Timberview HS	Grand Prairie, TX
G	44	Charise Holloway	5 ft 9 in (1.75 m)	Fr	St. Mary' HS	Tracy, CA

Head coach

Niya Butts

Assistant coach(es)

E.C. Hill
Sean LeBeauf
Calamity McEntire

Legend

- (C) Team captain
- (S) Suspended
- (I) Ineligible
- (W) Walk-on
- Injured
- Current redshirt

Roster

== Schedule ==
Date time, TV	Rank^{#}	Opponent^{#}	Result	Record	Site (attendance) city, state
Exitbition
11/11/2014*; 3:00 pm		Concordia (California)	W 76–55	–	McKale Center (885); Tucson, AZ
Regular Season
11/17/2014*; 7:00 pm		Cal State Bakersfield	L 72–76	0–1	McKale Center (1,205); Tucson, AZ
11/21/2014*; 6:00 pm		at Texas Tech	L 54–57	0–2	United Supermarkets Arena (3,525); Lubbock, TX
11/25/2014*; 11:00 am		UC Santa Barbara	W 61–34	1–2	McKale Center (6,268); Tucson, AZ
11/28/2014*; 4:00 pm		at FIU; FIU Thanksgiving Classic semifinals	W 65–58	2–2	FIU Arena (436); Miami, FL
11/30/2014*; 9:30 am		vs. Toledo; FIU Thanksgiving Classic championship	L 54–69	2–3	FIU Arena (123); Miami, FL
12/03/2014*; 7:00 pm		Grambling State	W 65–51	3–3	McKale Center (920); Tucson, AZ
12/07/2014*; 11:00 am		at Wake Forest	W 72–69 ^{OT}	4–3	LJVM Coliseum (512); Winston-Salem, NC
12/11/2014*; 7:00 pm		Southern	W 56–45	5–3	McKale Center (839); Tucson, AZ
12/14/2014*; 12:00 pm		UAB	W 49–44	6–3	McKale Center (859); Tucson, AZ
12/20/2014*; 3:30 pm		at Stephen F. Austin	L 60–72	6–4	William R. Johnson Coliseum (489); Nacogdoches, TX
12/29/2014*; 7:00 pm		Tennessee–Martin	W 61–56	7–4	McKale Center (1,110); Tucson, AZ
01/03/2015; 12:00 pm, P12N		Washington State	L 70–81	7–5 (0–1)	McKale Center (1,160); Tucson, AZ
01/05/2015; 6:00 pm, P12N		Washington	L 69–79	7–6 (0–2)	McKale Center (891); Tucson, AZ
01/08/2015; 6:00 pm, P12N		No. 18 Arizona State; State Farm Territorial Cup Series	L 41–88	7–7 (0–3)	McKale Center (2,804); Tucson, AZ
01/10/2015; 6:00 pm, P12N		at No. 18 Arizona State; State Farm Territorial Cup Series	L 54–71	7–8 (0–4)	Wells Fargo Arena (4,677); Tempe, AZ
01/16/2015; 9:00 pm, P12N		at No. 13 Stanford	L 47–77	7–9 (0–5)	Maples Pavilion (3,419); Stanford, CA
01/18/2015; 2:00 pm, P12N		at California	L 56–68	7–10 (0–6)	Haas Pavilion (2,569); Berkeley, CA
01/23/2015; 8:00 pm, P12N		No. 9 Oregon State	L 55–73	7–11 (0–7)	McKale Center (1,127); Tucson, AZ
01/25/2015; 1:00 pm		Oregon	W 81–78 ^{OT}	8–11 (1–7)	McKale Center (1,303); Tucson, AZ
01/30/2015; 7:00 pm		at Utah	L 48–62	8–12 (1–8)	Jon M. Huntsman Center (1,005); Salt Lake City, UT
02/01/2015; 11:00 am, P12N		at Colorado	L 69–81	8–13 (1–9)	Coors Events Center (1,863); Boulder, CO
02/06/2015; 6:00 pm		California	L 46–65	8–14 (1–10)	McKale Center (1,258); Tucson, AZ
02/08/2015; 3:00 pm, P12N		No. 12 Stanford	W 60–57	9–14 (2–10)	McKale Center (1,359); Tucson, AZ
02/13/2015; 7:00 pm		at Oregon	L 61–75	9–15 (2–11)	Matthew Knight Arena (1,435); Eugene, OR
02/15/2015; 12:00 pm, P12N		at No. 8 Oregon State	L 48–73	9–16 (2–12)	Gill Coliseum (4,284); Corvallis, OR
02/20/2015; 8:00 pm		at USC	L 51–77	9–17 (2–13)	Galen Center (526); Los Angeles, CA
02/22/2015; 2:00 pm, P12N		at UCLA	L 41–75	9–18 (2–14)	Pauley Pavilion (2,122); Los Angeles, CA
02/27/2015; 6:00 pm, P12N		Colorado	L 51–66	9–19 (2–15)	McKale Center (1,279); Tucson, AZ
03/01/2015; 3:00 pm, P12N		Utah	W 64–41	10–19 (3–15)	McKale Center (1,201); Tucson, AZ
2015 Pac-12 Tournament
03/05/2015; 3:00 pm, P12N		vs. UCLA; First Round	L 62–80	10–20	KeyArena (2,907); Seattle, WA
*Non-conference game. ^{#}Rankings from AP Poll. (#) Tournament seedings in parentheses. All times are in Mountain Time.

== See also ==
- 2014–15 Arizona Wildcats men's basketball team
