= Fred Castro =

American basketball coach

Current position
- Title: Associate head coach
- Team: Mississippi State
- Conference: SEC

Biographical details
- Born: Denton, Texas, U.S.
- Education: Oklahoma

Coaching career (HC unless noted)
- 2004–2005: Oklahoma (Volunteer asst.)
- 2007–2008: Rogers State (asst.)
- 2008–2009: Mercer (asst.)
- 2010–2011: Albany (asst.)
- 2011–2013: Tulsa (asst.)
- 2013–2016: Washington (asst.)
- 2016–2023: Eastern Michigan
- 2024–present: Mississippi State (assoc.)

Administrative career (AD unless noted)
- 2005–2007: Oklahoma (Video & Travel Coordinator)
- 2009–2010: Minnesota Lynx (scout)

Head coaching record
- Overall: 80–129 (.383)

Fred Castro is a women's basketball coach who is currently the associate head coach at Mississippi State. Formerly, he was head coach of the Eastern Michigan University women's basketball team, a position he assumed after the end of the 2016 season. He compiled an 80–129 record at Eastern Michigan. He was fired in December 2023 after a 1–7 start. Prior to that, he spent three years as the offensive coordinator of the University of Washington women's team, under head coach Mike Neighbors.

== Head coaching career ==
Sources:

- MAC 2017–18 Women's Basketball Standings
- MAC 2016–17 Women's Basketball Standings

Record table
| Season | Team | Overall | Conference | Standing | Postseason |
|---|---|---|---|---|---|
Eastern Michigan Eagles (Mid-American Conference) (2016–2023)
| 2016–17 | Eastern Michigan | 6–25 | 1–17 | 6th (West) | |
| 2017–18 | Eastern Michigan | 11–20 | 6–12 | 6th (West) | |
| 2018–19 | Eastern Michigan | 14–17 | 6–12 | 4th (West) | |
| 2019–20 | Eastern Michigan | 16–15 | 9–9 | 4th (West) | |
| 2020–21 | Eastern Michigan | 10–10 | 7–7 | 8th | |
| 2021–22 | Eastern Michigan | 7–20 | 4–16 | 11th | |
| 2022–23 | Eastern Michigan | 15–15 | 7–11 | 7th | |
| 2023–24 | Eastern Michigan | 1–7 | 0–0 | | |
| Eastern Michigan: | | 80–129 (.383) | 40–84 (.323) | | |
| Total: | | 80–129 (.383) | 40–84 (.323) | | |
National champion Postseason invitational champion Conference regular season champion Conference regular season and conference tournament champion Division regular season champion Division regular season and conference tournament champion Conference tournament champion
