= 2014–15 Arizona State Sun Devils women's basketball team =

Intercollegiate basketball season

2014–15 Arizona State Sun Devils women's basketball

ASU Classic Champions

NCAA Women's Tournament, Sweet Sixteen
- Conference: Pac-12 Conference

Ranking
- Coaches: No. 9
- AP: No. 9
- Record: 29–6 (15–3 Pac-12)
- Head coach: Charli Turner Thorne (18th season)
- Assistant coaches: Amanda Levens; Meg Sanders; Jackie Moore
- Home arena: Wells Fargo Arena

2014–15 Pac-12 Conference women's basketball standings
	Conf.				Overall
Team	W		L	PCT	W		L	PCT
No. 10 Oregon State	16	–	2	.889	27	–	5	.844
No. 9 Arizona State	15	–	3	.833	29	–	6	.829
No. 14 Stanford^{†}	13	–	5	.722	26	–	10	.722
No. 24 California	13	–	5	.722	23	–	10	.697
Washington	11	–	7	.611	23	–	10	.697
UCLA	8	–	10	.444	19	–	18	.514
Washington State	7	–	11	.389	17	–	15	.531
USC	7	–	11	.389	15	–	15	.500
Colorado	6	–	12	.333	15	–	17	.469
Oregon	6	–	12	.333	13	–	17	.433
Arizona	3	–	15	.167	10	–	20	.333
Utah	3	–	15	.167	9	–	22	.290
† 2015 Pac-12 Tournament winner As of April 4, 2015; Rankings from AP Poll

The 2014–15 Arizona State Sun Devils women's basketball team represented Arizona State University during the 2014–15 NCAA Division I women's basketball season. The Sun Devils, led by eighteenth-year head coach Charli Turner Thorne, played their games at the Wells Fargo Arena and were members of the Pac-12 Conference. They finished the season 29–5, 15–3 in Pac-12 play to finish in second place. They advanced to the semifinals of the Pac-12 women's tournament, where they lost to Stanford. They received an at-large bid to the NCAA women's tournament, where they defeated Ohio in the first round and Arkansas–Little Rock in the second round, before being defeated by Florida State in the sweet sixteen to end their season.

== Roster ==
2014–15 Arizona State Sun Devils women's basketball team
Players
Coaches

Pos.	#	Name	Height	Year	Previous school	Hometown
G	0	Katie Hempen	5 ft 9 in (1.75 m)	RS Jr	Highland HS/SIU Edwardsville	Highland, IL
G	1	Arnecia Hawkins	5 ft 10 in (1.78 m)	Jr	Mountain View HS	Mesa, AZ
G/F	2	Nicole Iademarco	6 ft 1 in (1.85 m)	Fr	The Woodlands HS	The Woodlands, TX
G	5	Tia Kanoa	5 ft 8 in (1.73 m)	Fr	Kamehameha HS	Honolulu, HI
G	10	Promise Amukamara	5 ft 8 in (1.73 m)	Sr	Apollo HS	Glendale, AZ
G	11	Peace Amukamara	5 ft 7 in (1.7 m)	Jr	Mesa CC/Millennium HS	Goodyear, AZ
G	20	Isidora Purkovic	5 ft 11 in (1.8 m)	Jr	Western Canada HS	Calgary, AB
F	21	Sophie Brunner	6 ft 1 in (1.85 m)	So	Aquin HS	Freeport, IL
C	22	Quinn Dornstauder	6 ft 4 in (1.93 m)	So	Dr. Martin LeBoldus HS	Regina, SK
G	23	Elisha Davis	5 ft 3 in (1.6 m)	Jr	Berkeley HS	Oakland, CA
F	24	Kelsey Moos	6 ft 0 in (1.83 m)	So	Reardan HS	Edwall, WA
C	34	Ayanna Edwards	6 ft 4 in (1.93 m)	Fr	Sacramento HS	Sacramento, CA
G	43	Eliza Normen	6 ft 0 in (1.83 m)	RS Jr	Monarch HS	Louisville, CO

Head coach

Charli Turner Thorne

Assistant coach(es)

Amanda Levens
Meg Sanders
Jackie Moore

Legend

- (C) Team captain
- (S) Suspended
- (I) Ineligible
- (W) Walk-on
- Injured
- Current redshirt

Roster

== Rankings ==
Ranking movement Legend: ██ Increase in ranking. ██ Decrease in ranking. NR = Not ranked. RV = Received votes.
Poll	Pre	Wk 2	Wk 3	Wk 4	Wk 5	Wk 6	Wk 7	Wk 8	Wk 9	Wk 10	Wk 11	Wk 12	Wk 13	Wk 14	Wk 15	Wk 16	Wk 17	Wk 18	Final
AP	RV	RV	RV	RV	RV	RV	25	22	18	14	13	11	10	12	12	10	9	9	9
Coaches	RV	RV	RV	RV	RV	RV	RV	RV	20	17	12	11	10	12	13	10	8	9	9

== Schedule ==
Date time, TV	Rank^{#}	Opponent^{#}	Result	Record	Site (attendance) city, state
Non-conference regular season
11/14/2014*; 5:00 pm		Middle Tennessee	W 81–67	1–0	Wells Fargo Arena (5,799); Tempe, AZ
11/19/2014*; 6:00 pm		Cal State Bakersfield	W 83–54	2–0	Wells Fargo Arena (1,165); Tempe, AZ
11/25/2014*; 5:00 pm		at Miami (FL)	W 65–61	3–0	BankUnited Center (584); Coral Gables, FL
11/28/2014*; 12:30 pm		vs. Villanova; Gulf Coast Showcase Quarterfinals	W 51–46	4–0	Germain Arena (N/A); Estero, FL
11/29/2014*; 4:00 pm		vs. Green Bay; Gulf Coast Showcase semifinals	L 57–63	4–1	Germain Arena (N/A); Estero, FL
11/30/2014*; 4:00 pm		vs. Vanderbilt; Gulf Coast Showcase 3rd place game	W 72–67	5–1	Germain Arena (N/A); Estero, FL
12/06/2014*; 3:00 pm, P12N		SMU	W 77–42	6–1	Wells Fargo Arena (1,634); Tempe, AZ
12/13/2014*; 2:30 pm		UC Davis	W 72–51	7–1	Wells Fargo Arena (5,890); Tempe, AZ
12/16/2014*; 6:05 pm		at Illinois State	W 89–44	8–1	Redbird Arena (1,505); Normal, IL
12/20/2014*; 1:00 pm		Lehigh; ASU Classic semifinals	W 81–61	9–1	Wells Fargo Arena (1,189); Tempe, AZ
12/21/2014*; 2:00 pm		Northwestern; ASU Classic championship	W 88–75	10–1	Wells Fargo Arena (2,647); Tempe, AZ
12/28/2014*; 2:30 pm	No. 25	Yale	W 69–51	11–1	Wells Fargo Arena (6,503); Tempe, AZ
Pac-12 regular season
01/03/2015; 2:00 pm, P12N	No. 22	Washington	W 62–48	12–1 (1–0)	Wells Fargo Arena (1,877); Tempe, AZ
01/05/2015; 8:00 pm, P12N	No. 18	Washington State	W 78–64	13–1 (2–0)	Wells Fargo Arena (1,366); Tempe, AZ
01/08/2015; 6:00 pm, P12N	No. 18	at Arizona; State Farm Territorial Cup Series	W 88–41	14–1 (3–0)	McKale Center (2,804); Tucson, AZ
01/10/2015; 6:00 pm, P12N	No. 18	Arizona; State Farm Territorial Cup Series	W 71–54	15–1 (4–0)	Wells Fargo Arena (4,677); Tempe, AZ
01/16/2015; 7:00 pm, P12N	No. 14	at California	W 67–52	16–1 (5–0)	Haas Pavilion (2,042); Berkeley, CA
01/19/2015; 4:00 pm, P12N	No. 13	at No. 11 Stanford	W 60–57	17–1 (6–0)	Maples Pavilion (3,546); Stanford, CA
01/23/2015; 11:00 am, P12N	No. 13	Oregon	W 70–58	18–1 (7–0)	Wells Fargo Arena (5,061); Tempe, AZ
01/25/2015; 2:00 pm, P12N	No. 13	No. 9 Oregon State	L 57–68	18–2 (7–1)	Wells Fargo Arena (2,946); Tempe, AZ
01/30/2015; 2:00 pm	No. 11	at Colorado	W 68–60	19–2 (8–1)	Coors Events Center (3,954); Boulder, CO
02/01/2015; 3:00 pm	No. 11	at Utah	W 58–48	20–2 (9–1)	Jon M. Huntsman Center (637); Salt Lake City, UT
02/06/2015; 4:00 pm, P12N	No. 10	No. 12 Stanford	W 53–52	21–2 (10–1)	Wells Fargo Arena (3,339); Tempe, AZ
02/08/2015; 2:00 pm, ESPNU	No. 10	California	L 49–50	21–3 (10–2)	Wells Fargo Arena (2,150); Tempe, AZ
02/13/2015; 7:00 pm, P12N	No. 12	at No. 8 Oregon State	L 64–70	21–4 (10–3)	Gill Coliseum (5,242); Corvallis, OR
02/15/2015; 5:30 pm, P12N	No. 12	at Oregon	W 72–52	22–4 (11–3)	Matthew Knight Arena (1,480); Eugene, OR
02/20/2015; 8:00 pm	No. 12	at UCLA	W 68–56	23–4 (12–3)	Pauley Pavilion (1,790); Los Angeles, CA
02/22/2015; 4:00 pm, P12N	No. 12	at USC	W 76–73 ^{2OT}	24–4 (13–3)	Galen Center (2,800); Los Angeles, CA
02/27/2015; 6:30 pm	No. 10	Utah	W 46–42	25–4 (14–3)	Wells Fargo Arena (2,405); Tempe, AZ
03/01/2015; 2:00 pm	No. 10	Colorado	W 59–46	26–4 (15–3)	Wells Fargo Arena (2,021); Tempe, AZ
Pac-12 Women's Tournament
03/06/2015; 12:30 pm, P12N	No. 9	vs. Washington State; Quarterfinals	W 67–48	27–4	KeyArena (N/A); Seattle, WA
03/07/2015; 7:00 pm, P12N	No. 9	vs. No. 19 Stanford; Semifinals	L 56–59	27–5	KeyArena (N/A); Seattle, WA
NCAA Women's Tournament
03/21/2015*; 3:35 pm, ESPN2	No. 9	Ohio; First Round	W 74–55	28–5	Wells Fargo Arena (2,588); Tempe, AZ
03/23/2015*; 6:00 pm, ESPN2	No. 9	Arkansas–Little Rock; Second Round	W 57–54	29–5	Wells Fargo Arena (1,891); Tempe, AZ
03/27/2015*; 6:30 pm, ESPN2	No. 9	vs. No. 7 Florida State; Sweet Sixteen	L 65–66	29–6	Greensboro Coliseum (6,286); Greensboro, NC
*Non-conference game. ^{#}Rankings from AP Poll. (#) Tournament seedings in parentheses. All times are in Mountain Time.

== See also ==
- 2014–15 Arizona State Sun Devils men's basketball team
