= 2014–15 UCLA Bruins women's basketball team =

American college basketball season

2014–15 UCLA Bruins women's basketball

WNIT champions
- Conference: Pac-12 Conference
- Record: 19–18 (8–10 Pac-12)
- Head coach: Cori Close (4th season)
- Assistant coaches: Jenny Huth; Tony Newnan; Shannon Perry
- Home arena: Pauley Pavilion

2014–15 Pac-12 Conference women's basketball standings
	Conf.				Overall
Team	W		L	PCT	W		L	PCT
No. 10 Oregon State	16	–	2	.889	27	–	5	.844
No. 9 Arizona State	15	–	3	.833	29	–	6	.829
No. 14 Stanford^{†}	13	–	5	.722	26	–	10	.722
No. 24 California	13	–	5	.722	23	–	10	.697
Washington	11	–	7	.611	23	–	10	.697
UCLA	8	–	10	.444	19	–	18	.514
Washington State	7	–	11	.389	17	–	15	.531
USC	7	–	11	.389	15	–	15	.500
Colorado	6	–	12	.333	15	–	17	.469
Oregon	6	–	12	.333	13	–	17	.433
Arizona	3	–	15	.167	10	–	20	.333
Utah	3	–	15	.167	9	–	22	.290
† 2015 Pac-12 Tournament winner As of April 4, 2015; Rankings from AP Poll

The 2014–15 UCLA Bruins women's basketball team represented the University of California, Los Angeles during the 2014–15 NCAA Division I women's basketball season. The Bruins, led by fourth year head coach Cori Close, play their home games at the Pauley Pavilion and were members of the Pac-12 Conference. The Bruins finished in 6th place in the Pac-12 Conference and were selected to play in the WNIT. The Bruins defeated the West Virginia Mountaineers 62–60 for the WNIT championship on April 4, 2015. Jordin Canada was the tournament's most valuable player.

== Roster ==
2014–15 UCLA Bruins women's basketball team
Players
Coaches

Pos.	#	Name	Height	Year	Previous school	Hometown
G	2	Kari Korver	5 ft 9 in (1.75 m)	RS So	Valley Christian	Paramount, CA
G	3	Jordin Canada	5 ft 6 in (1.68 m)	Fr	Windward	Los Angeles, CA
G	5	Recee' Caldwell	5 ft 8 in (1.73 m)	Fr	Homeschooled	San Antonio, TX
F	10	Kacy Swain	6 ft 3 in (1.91 m)	RS Jr	St. Bernard's	Los Angeles, CA
F	11	Lajahna Drummer	6 ft 1 in (1.85 m)	Fr	Long Beach Poly HS	Inglewood, CA
C	13	Luiana Livulo	6 ft 3 in (1.91 m)	Sr	Northwest Florida State College; Escola Secondaria Rainha D. Amelia	Lisbon, Portugal
G	20	Dominique Williams	5 ft 8 in (1.73 m)	So	Saint Mary's	Phoenix, AZ
G	21	Nirra Fields	5 ft 9 in (1.75 m)	Jr	Mater Dei	Montreal, QE
G	22	Madeline Poteet	5 ft 8 in (1.73 m)	Sr	Temecula HS	Temecula, CA
G	23	Kelli Hayes	6 ft 0 in (1.83 m)	Fr	Archbishop Mitty	San Jose, CA
F	24	Paulina Hersler	6 ft 3 in (1.91 m)	RS Fr	Igelstavikens Gymnasium	Malmö, Sweden
F	25	Monique Billings	6 ft 4 in (1.93 m)	Fr	Santiago	Corona, CA
G	32	Chrissy Baird	6 ft 1 in (1.85 m)	Fr	Wheaton North	Wheaton, IL
F/C	34	Corinne Costa	6 ft 4 in (1.93 m)	Sr	Liberty HS	Discovery Bay, CA
C	54	Savanna Trapp	6 ft 9 in (2.06 m)	RS Fr	Esko	Esko, MN

Head coach

Cori Close

Assistant coach(es)

Jenny Huth
Tony Newnan
Shannon Perry

Legend

- (C) Team captain
- (S) Suspended
- (I) Ineligible
- (W) Walk-on
- Injured
- Current redshirt

Roster

== Schedule ==
Date time, TV	Rank^{#}	Opponent^{#}	Result	Record	Site (attendance) city, state
Exhibition
11/02/2014*; 2:00 pm	No. 23	Westmont	W 92–54	–	Pauley Pavilion (1,198); Los Angeles, CA
Non-conference regular season
11/14/2014*; 10:00 am	No. 23	at James Madison	L 87–91 ^{OT}	0–1	JMU Convocation Center (2,831); Harrisburg, VA
11/16/2014*; 11:00 am	No. 23	at No. 11 North Carolina	L 68–84	0–2	Carmichael Arena (3,077); Chapel Hill, NC
11/23/2014*; 1:00 pm, P12N		No. 10 Texas	L 65–75	0–3	Pauley Pavilion (2,583); Los Angeles, CA
11/28/2014*; 1:00 pm, P12N		No. 15 Nebraska	L 66–71	0–4	Pauley Pavilion (1,169); Los Angeles, CA
12/02/2014*; 7:00 pm		Cincinnati	W 66–58	1–4	Pauley Pavilion (507); Los Angeles, CA
12/10/2014*; 5:00 pm, P12N		UC Riverside	W 67–53	2–4	Pauley Pavilion (550); Los Angeles, CA
12/12/2014*; 7:00 pm		Sacramento State	W 92–83	3–4	Pauley Pavilion (665); Los Angeles, CA
12/18/2014*; 3:00 pm		vs. Miami (FL); Tulane DoubleTree Classic	L 67–74	3–5	Devlin Fieldhouse (213); New Orleans, LA
12/19/2014*; 3:00 pm		vs. Samford; Tulane DoubleTree Classic	W 71–52	4–5	Devlin Fieldhouse (118); New Orleans, LA
12/21/2014*; 2:00 pm, ESPN2		vs. No. 2 Connecticut; Hall of Fame Women's Challenge	L 50–86	4–6	Mohegan Sun Arena (8,015); Uncasville, CT
12/28/2014*; 2:00 pm, P12N		No. 4 Notre Dame	L 67–82	4–7	Pauley Pavilion (3,004); Los Angeles, CA
Pac-12 regular season
12/30/2014; 6:00 pm, P12N		at USC; Rivalry	W 59–52	5–7 (1–0)	Galen Center (1,587); Los Angeles, CA
01/03/2015; 5:00 pm, P12N		No. 13 Oregon State	L 47–65	5–8 (1–1)	Pauley Pavilion (1,498); Los Angeles, CA
01/05/2015; 5:00 pm, P12N		Oregon	L 46–62	5–9 (1–2)	Pauley Pavilion (834); Los Angeles, CA
01/09/2015; 5:00 pm, P12N		at Utah	W 49–46	6–9 (2–2)	Jon M. Huntsman Center (980); Salt Lake City, UT
01/11/2015; 1:00 pm, P12N		at Colorado	W 90–84	7–9 (3–2)	Coors Events Center (2,190); Boulder, CO
01/18/2015; 7:30 pm, P12N		USC; Rivalry	W 71–60	8–9 (4–2)	Pauley Pavilion (4,022); Los Angeles, CA
01/23/2015; 7:00 pm, P12N		No. 11 Stanford	L 70–79	8–10 (4–3)	Pauley Pavilion (1,837); Los Angeles, CA
01/25/2015; 3:00 pm, P12N		California	L 57–72	8–11 (4–4)	Pauley Pavilion (6,103); Los Angeles, CA
01/31/2015; 12:30 pm, P12N		at Oregon	L 65–67	8–12 (4–5)	Matthew Knight Arena (1,501); Eugene, OR
02/02/2015; 7:00 pm, P12N		at No. 7 Oregon State	L 64–82	8–13 (4–6)	Gill Coliseum (2,636); Corvallis, OR
02/06/2015; 7:00 pm		Colorado	W 72–65	9–13 (5–6)	Pauley Pavilion (1,134); Los Angeles, CA
02/08/2015; 2:00 pm		Utah	W 58–45	10–13 (6–6)	Pauley Pavilion (1,562); Los Angeles, CA
02/12/2015; 8:00 pm, P12N		at California	L 64–70	10–14 (6–7)	Haas Pavilion (2,013); Berkeley, CA
02/15/2015; 4:30 pm, P12N		at No. 19 Stanford	L 50–68	10–15 (6–8)	Maples Pavilion (4,270); Stanford, CA
02/20/2015; 7:00 pm		No. 12 Arizona State	L 56–68	10–16 (6–9)	Pauley Pavilion (1,790); Los Angeles, CA
02/22/2015; 1:00 pm, P12N		Arizona	W 75–41	11–16 (7–9)	Pauley Pavilion (2,122); Los Angeles, CA
02/26/2015; 7:00 pm		at Washington State	W 74–69	12–16 (8–9)	Beasley Coliseum (573); Pullman, WA
02/28/2015; 1:00 pm, P12N		at Washington	L 61–74	12–17 (8–10)	Alaska Airlines Arena (3,447); Seattle, WA
Pac-12 Women's Tournament
03/05/2015; 2:00 pm, P12N		vs. Arizona; First Round	W 80–62	13–17	KeyArena (2,907); Seattle, WA
03/06/2015; 2:00 pm, P12N		vs. No. 19 Stanford; Quarterfinals	L 62–67	13–18	KeyArena (3,869); Seattle, WA
WNIT
03/19/2015*; 7:00 pm		Cal State Bakersfield; First Round	W 70–54	14–18	Pauley Pavilion (635); Los Angeles, CA
03/22/2015*; 2:00 pm		at San Diego; Second Round	W 63–58	15–18	Jenny Craig Pavilion (467); San Diego, CA
03/26/2015*; 7:00 pm		Northern Colorado; Third Round	W 74–60	16–18	Pauley Pavilion (760); Los Angeles, CA
03/29/2015*; 2:00 pm		Saint Mary's; Quarterfinals	W 82–66	17–18	Pauley Pavilion (746); Los Angeles, CA
04/01/2015*; 4:00 pm		at Michigan; Semifinals	W 69–65	18–18	Crisler Arena (2,209); Ann Arbor, MI
04/04/2015*; 12:00 pm, CBSSN		at West Virginia; Championship Game	W 62–60	19–18	Charleston Civic Center (8,403); Charleston, WV
*Non-conference game. ^{#}Rankings from AP Poll. (#) Tournament seedings in parentheses. All times are in Pacific Time.

== Rankings ==
Ranking movement Legend: ██ Increase in ranking. ██ Decrease in ranking. NR = Not ranked. RV = Received votes.
Poll	Pre	Wk 2	Wk 3	Wk 4	Wk 5	Wk 6	Wk 7	Wk 8	Wk 9	Wk 10	Wk 11	Wk 12	Wk 13	Wk 14	Wk 15	Wk 16	Wk 17	Wk 18	Final
AP	23	RV	RV	NR	NR	NR	NR	NR	NR	NR	NR	NR	NR	NR	NR	NR	NR	NR	NR
Coaches	23	NR	NR	NR	NR	NR	NR	NR	NR	NR	NR	NR	NR	NR	NR	NR	NR	NR	NR

== See also ==
- 2014–15 UCLA Bruins men's basketball team
