= 2014–15 Oregon Ducks women's basketball team =

Intercollegiate basketball season

2014–15 Oregon Ducks women's basketball
- Conference: Pac-12 Conference
- Record: 13–17 (6–12 Pac-12)
- Head coach: Kelly Graves (1st season)
- Assistant coaches: Jodie Berry; Mark Campbell; Nicole Powell
- Home arena: Matthew Knight Arena

2014–15 Pac-12 Conference women's basketball standings
	Conf.				Overall
Team	W		L	PCT	W		L	PCT
No. 10 Oregon State	16	–	2	.889	27	–	5	.844
No. 9 Arizona State	15	–	3	.833	29	–	6	.829
No. 14 Stanford^{†}	13	–	5	.722	26	–	10	.722
No. 24 California	13	–	5	.722	23	–	10	.697
Washington	11	–	7	.611	23	–	10	.697
UCLA	8	–	10	.444	19	–	18	.514
Washington State	7	–	11	.389	17	–	15	.531
USC	7	–	11	.389	15	–	15	.500
Colorado	6	–	12	.333	15	–	17	.469
Oregon	6	–	12	.333	13	–	17	.433
Arizona	3	–	15	.167	10	–	20	.333
Utah	3	–	15	.167	9	–	22	.290
† 2015 Pac-12 Tournament winner As of April 4, 2015; Rankings from AP Poll

The 2014–15 Oregon Ducks women's basketball team represented the University of Oregon during the 2014–15 NCAA Division I women's basketball season. The Ducks, led by first year head coach Kelly Graves, played their games at the Matthew Knight Arena and were members of the Pac-12 Conference. They finished the season 13–17, 6–12 in Pac-12 play to finish in a tie for ninth place. They lost in the first round in the Pac-12 women's tournament to Washington State.

== Roster ==
2014–15 Oregon Ducks women's basketball team
Players
Coaches

Pos.	#	Name	Height	Year	Previous school	Hometown
G	1	Drea Toler	5 ft 5 in (1.65 m)	So	Serra HS	Los Angeles, CA
G	3	Marie Berthuel	5 ft 3 in (1.6 m)	Sr	Lycée Guillaume Apollinaire	Nice, France
G	5	Jordan Loera	5 ft 9 in (1.75 m)	RS Jr	Moses Lake HS	Moses Lake, WA
G	10	Lexi Bando	5 ft 9 in (1.75 m)	Fr	Willamette HS	Eugene, OR
G	12	Amanda Delgado	5 ft 7 in (1.7 m)	Sr	Liberty HS	Las Vegas, NV
F	14	Jillian Alleyne	6 ft 3 in (1.91 m)	Jr	Summit HS	Fontana, CA
F	15	Jacinta Vandenberg	6 ft 5 in (1.96 m)	Jr	Fresno State; Sandringham College	Melbourne, Australia
G	23	Chloe Stiles	5 ft 8 in (1.73 m)	Jr	Sheldon HS	Eugene, OR
G	31	Katelyn Loper	5 ft 11 in (1.8 m)	Sr	Hofstra; Post Falls HS	Post Falls, ID
C	32	Janitah Iamaleava	6 ft 2 in (1.88 m)	Jr	Carson HS	Long Beach, CA
G	33	Lexi Petersen	5 ft 11 in (1.8 m)	Jr	Seattle Christian HS	Tukwila, WA
C	40	Megan Carpenter	6 ft 4 in (1.93 m)	Sr	Longmont HS	Longmont, CO
F	44	Tatum Neubert	6 ft 2 in (1.88 m)	Fr	Elizabeth HS	Elizabeth, CO
F	51	Katie Gruys	6 ft 0 in (1.83 m)	Jr	Annadale HS	Maple Lake, MN

Head coach

Kelly Graves

Assistant coach(es)

Jodie Berry
Mark Campbell
Nicole Powell

Legend

- (C) Team captain
- (S) Suspended
- (I) Ineligible
- (W) Walk-on
- Injured
- Current redshirt

Roster

== Schedule ==
Date time, TV	Rank^{#}	Opponent^{#}	Result	Record	Site (attendance) city, state
Exhibition
11/09/2014*; 2:00 pm		Westmont College	W 81–44	–	Matthew Knight Arena (N/A); Eugene, OR
Non-conference regular season
11/14/2014*; 12:00 pm		Utah State	W 100–77	1–0	Matthew Knight Arena (1,569); Eugene, OR
11/23/2014*; 3:00 pm, P12N		No. 13 North Carolina	L 59–76	1–1	Matthew Knight Arena (2,038); Eugene, OR
11/25/2014*; 6:00 pm		Portland State	W 63–56	2–1	Matthew Knight Arena (1,256); Eugene, OR
11/28/2014*; 6:00 pm		vs. Central Michigan; South Point Thanksgiving Shootout	L 67–73	2–2	South Point Arena (N/A); Enterprise, NV
11/29/2014*; 6:00 pm		vs. American; South Point Thanksgiving Shootout	L 64–72	2–3	South Point Arena (177); Enterprise, NV
12/05/2014*; 7:00 pm		at Portland	W 72–49	3–3	Chiles Center (313); Portland, OR
12/06/2014*; 7:00 pm		Navy	W 72–64	4–3	Matthew Knight Arena (1,300); Eugene, OR
12/13/2014*; 2:00 pm		Northern Arizona	W 59–47	5–3	Matthew Knight Arena (1,286); Eugene, OR
12/18/2014*; 6:00 pm		Santa Clara	W 92–88 ^{2OT}	6–3	Matthew Knight Arena (1,245); Eugene, OR
12/21/2014*; 2:00 pm		Fresno State	L 59–68	6–4	Matthew Knight Arena (1,321); Eugene, OR
12/29/2014*; 4:00 pm		Seattle	W 70–44	7–4	Matthew Knight Arena (1,310); Eugene, OR
Pac-12 regular season
01/03/2015; 3:00 pm, P12N		at USC	L 54–70	7–5 (0–1)	Galen Center (956); Los Angeles, CA
01/05/2015; 5:00 pm, P12N		at UCLA	W 62–46	8–5 (1–1)	Pauley Pavilion (834); Los Angeles, CA
01/09/2015; 7:00 pm, P12N		at No. 11 Oregon State; Civil War	L 37–70	8–6 (1–2)	Gill Coliseum (7,652); Corvallis, OR
01/11/2015; 5:00 pm, P12N		No. 11 Oregon State; Civil War	L 48–77	8–7 (1–3)	Matthew Knight Arena (2,106); Eugene, OR
01/16/2015; 8:00 pm, P12N		Washington	L 69–91	8–8 (1–4)	Matthew Knight Arena (1,317); Eugene, OR
01/18/2015; 1:00 pm, P12N		Washington State	L 76–79	8–9 (1–5)	Matthew Knight Arena (1,888); Eugene, OR
01/23/2015; 10:00 am, P12N		at Arizona State	L 58–70	8–10 (1–6)	Wells Fargo Arena (5,061); Tempe, AZ
01/25/2015; 12:00 pm		at Arizona	L 78–81 ^{OT}	8–11 (1–7)	McKale Center (1,303); Tucson, AZ
01/31/2015; 12:30 pm, P12N		UCLA	W 67–65	9–11 (2–7)	Matthew Knight Arena (1,501); Eugene, OR
02/02/2015; 5:00 pm, P12N		USC	W 63–57	10–11 (3–7)	Matthew Knight Arena (1,208); Eugene, OR
02/06/2015; 5:00 pm, P12N		at Washington State	W 70–69	11–11 (3–8)	Beasley Coliseum (1,009); Pullman, WA
02/08/2015; 6:00 pm, P12N		at Washington	L 55–70	11–12 (4–8)	Alaska Airlines Arena (2,232); Seattle, WA
02/13/2015; 6:00 pm		Arizona	W 75–61	12–12 (5–8)	Matthew Knight Arena (1,435); Eugene, OR
02/15/2015; 4:30 pm, P12N		No. 12 Arizona State	L 52–72	12–13 (5–9)	Matthew Knight Arena (1,480); Eugene, OR
02/20/2015; 6:00 pm		at Utah	L 64–66	12–14 (5–10)	Jon M. Huntsman Center (1,008); Salt Lake City, UT
02/22/2015; 1:00 pm		at Colorado	L 69–84	12–15 (5–11)	Coors Events Center (3,668); Boulder, CO
02/26/2015; 6:00 pm		No. 24 California	L 59–74	12–16 (5–12)	Matthew Knight Arena (1,302); Eugene, OR
03/01/2015; 1:00 pm, ESPNU		No. 19 Stanford	W 62–55	13–16 (6–12)	Matthew Knight Arena (1,949); Eugene, OR
Pac-12 Women's Tournament
03/05/2015; 11:30 am, P12N		vs. Washington State; First Round	L 64–66	13–17	KeyArena (N/A); Seattle, WA
*Non-conference game. ^{#}Rankings from AP Poll. (#) Tournament seedings in parentheses. All times are in Pacific Time.

== Rankings ==
Ranking movement Legend: ██ Increase in ranking. ██ Decrease in ranking. NR = Not ranked. RV = Received votes.
Poll	Pre	Wk 2	Wk 3	Wk 4	Wk 5	Wk 6	Wk 7	Wk 8	Wk 9	Wk 10	Wk 11	Wk 12	Wk 13	Wk 14	Wk 15	Wk 16	Wk 17	Wk 18	Final
AP	RV	RV	NR	NR	NR	NR	NR	NR	NR	NR	NR	NR	NR	NR	NR	NR	NR	NR	NR
Coaches	RV	RV	RV	NR	NR	NR	NR	NR	NR	NR	NR	NR	NR	NR	NR	NR	NR	NR	NR

== See also ==
- 2014–15 Oregon Ducks men's basketball team
