= 2014–15 Utah Utes women's basketball team =

Intercollegiate basketball season

2014–15 Utah Utes women's basketball
- Conference: Pac-12 Conference
- Record: 9–21 (3–15 Pac–12)
- Head coach: Anthony Levrets (5th season)
- Assistant coaches: Matt Legerski (6th season); Velaida Harris (12th season); JD Gustin (1st season)
- Home arena: Jon M. Huntsman Center

2014–15 Pac-12 Conference women's basketball standings
	Conf.				Overall
Team	W		L	PCT	W		L	PCT
No. 10 Oregon State	16	–	2	.889	27	–	5	.844
No. 9 Arizona State	15	–	3	.833	29	–	6	.829
No. 14 Stanford^{†}	13	–	5	.722	26	–	10	.722
No. 24 California	13	–	5	.722	23	–	10	.697
Washington	11	–	7	.611	23	–	10	.697
UCLA	8	–	10	.444	19	–	18	.514
Washington State	7	–	11	.389	17	–	15	.531
USC	7	–	11	.389	15	–	15	.500
Colorado	6	–	12	.333	15	–	17	.469
Oregon	6	–	12	.333	13	–	17	.433
Arizona	3	–	15	.167	10	–	20	.333
Utah	3	–	15	.167	9	–	22	.290
† 2015 Pac-12 Tournament winner As of April 4, 2015; Rankings from AP Poll

The 2014–15 Utah Utes women's basketball team represented the University of Utah during the 2014–15 NCAA Division I men's basketball season. They played their home games at the Jon M. Huntsman Center in Salt Lake City, Utah and were a member of the Pac-12 Conference. The Utes were led by fifth-year head coach Anthony Levrets. They finished the season 9–21, 3–15 in Pac-12 play to finish in a tie for eleventh place. They lost in the first round of the Pac-12 women's tournament to Washington.

== Roster ==
2014–15 Utah Utes women's basketball team
Players
Coaches

Pos.	#	Name	Height	Year	Previous school	Hometown
G	1	Gabrielle Bowie	5 ft 9 in (1.75 m)	Fr	Johnson HS	San Antonio, TX
F	2	Jada Matthews	6 ft 1 in (1.85 m)	Fr	Long Beach Poly HS	Long Beach, CA
F	3	Malia Nawahine	5 ft 10 in (1.78 m)	So	Springville HS	Springville, UT
G	5	Cheyenne Wilson	5 ft 11 in (1.8 m)	Sr	Cleveland HS	Seattle, WA
F	10	Nakia Arquette	6 ft 1 in (1.85 m)	RS So	Lewis and Clark HS	Spokane, WA
F	11	Taryn Wicijowski	6 ft 3 in (1.91 m)	RS Sr	National Elite Developmental Academy	Regina, SK
F	12	Emily Potter	6 ft 5 in (1.96 m)	So	Glenlawn Collegiate	Winnipeg, MB
G	13	Devri Owens	5 ft 8 in (1.73 m)	So	Plano West HS	Plano, TX
G	14	Paige Crozon	6 ft 1 in (1.85 m)	RS So	Humboldt Collegiate Institute	Humboldt, SK
G	20	Katie Kuklok	5 ft 10 in (1.78 m)	Fr	Utah Valley	Poway, CA
F	21	Wendy Anae	6 ft 3 in (1.91 m)	So	Cathedral Catholic HS	San Diego, CA
G	22	Danielle Rodriguez	5 ft 10 in (1.78 m)	Jr	Warren HS	Downey, CA
G	24	Valerie Nawahine	5 ft 9 in (1.75 m)	Jr	BYU	Springville, UT
F	32	Tanaeya Boclair	6 ft 0 in (1.83 m)	Fr	Brennan HS	San Antonio, TX
C	34	Joeseta Fatuesi	6 ft 4 in (1.93 m)	Fr	Wilcox HS	Santa Clara, CA

Head coach

Anthony Levrets

Assistant coach(es)

Matt Legerski
Velaida Harris
JD Gustin

Legend

- (C) Team captain
- (S) Suspended
- (I) Ineligible
- (W) Walk-on
- Injured
- Current redshirt

Roster
Last update: 2014-11-28

== Schedule and results ==
Date time, TV	Rank^{#}	Opponent^{#}	Result	Record	Site (attendance) city, state
Exhibition
11/05/2014*; 7:00 pm		Alaska Anchorage	L 61–67	–	Jon M. Huntsman Center (643); Salt Lake City, UT
Regular season
11/14/2014*; 5:00 pm		San Jose State	W 100–87 ^{OT}	1–0	Jon M. Huntsman Center (694); Salt Lake City, UT
11/20/2014*; 6:05 pm		at Creighton	L 56–64	1–1	D. J. Sokol Arena (1,437); Omaha, NE
11/23/2014*; 12:00 pm		at No. 16 Nebraska	L 43–66	1–2	Pinnacle Bank Arena (3,321); Lincoln, NE
11/28/2014*; 7:30 pm		vs. Ole Miss; Nugget Classic semifinals	L 38–52	1–3	Lawlor Events Center (163); Reno, NV
11/29/2014*; 3:00 pm		vs. Portland; Nugget Classic consolation round	L 50–58	1–4	Lawlor Events Center (368); Reno, NV
12/03/2014*; 6:00 pm		Utah State	W 63–57	2–4	Jon M. Huntsman Center (678); Salt Lake City, UT
12/06/2014*; 3:00 pm		UNLV	W 62–49	3–4	Jon M. Huntsman Center (626); Salt Lake City, UT
12/10/2014*; 7:00 pm		Idaho State	W 59–40	4–4	Jon M. Huntsman Center (616); Salt Lake City, UT
12/13/2014*; 12:00 pm, P12N		BYU; Desert First Duel	L 56–60	4–5	Jon M. Huntsman Center (1,159); Salt Lake City, UT
12/20/2014*; 3:00 pm		Louisiana Tech	W 67–52	5–5	Jon M. Huntsman Center (453); Salt Lake City, UT
12/29/2014*; 7:00 pm		Charlotte	W 54–52	6–5	Jon M. Huntsman Center (645); Salt Lake City, UT
01/03/2015; 6:00 pm, P12N		at California	L 49–67	6–6 (0–1)	Haas Pavilion (2,232); Berkeley, CA
01/05/2015; 6:00 pm, P12N		at No. 15 Stanford	L 44–55	6–7 (0–2)	Maples Pavilion (2,782); Stanford, CA
01/09/2015; 6:00 pm, P12N		UCLA	L 46–49	6–8 (0–3)	Jon M. Huntsman Center (980); Salt Lake City, UT
01/11/2015; 12:00 pm, P12N		USC	L 43–46	6–9 (0–4)	Jon M. Huntsman Center (652); Salt Lake City, UT
01/14/2015; 7:00 pm, P12N		at Colorado	L 72–77 ^{OT}	6–10 (0–5)	Coors Events Center (1,652); Boulder, CO
01/18/2015; 12:00 pm, P12N		Colorado	L 54–73	6–11 (0–6)	Jon M. Huntsman Center (523); Salt Lake City, UT
01/23/2015; 8:00 pm		at Washington State	L 54–63	6–12 (0–7)	Beasley Coliseum (874); Pullman, WA
01/25/2015; 12:00 pm, P12N		at Washington	L 51–63	6–13 (0–8)	Alaska Airlines Arena (2,281); Seattle, WA
01/30/2015; 7:00 pm		Arizona	W 62–48	7–13 (1–8)	Jon M. Huntsman Center (1,005); Salt Lake City, UT
02/01/2015; 3:00 pm		No. 11 Arizona State	L 48–58	7–14 (1–9)	Jon M. Huntsman Center (637); Salt Lake City, UT
02/06/2015; 8:00 pm, P12N		at USC	L 54–73	7–15 (1–10)	Galen Center (246); Los Angeles, CA
02/08/2015; 3:00 pm		at UCLA	L 45–58	7–16 (1–11)	Pauley Pavilion (1,562); Los Angeles, CA
02/13/2015; 7:00 pm		Washington	W 69–61	8–16 (2–11)	Jon M. Huntsman Center (768); Salt Lake City, UT
02/15/2015; 12:00 pm, P12N		Washington State	L 52–61	8–17 (2–12)	Jon M. Huntsman Center (653); Salt Lake City, UT
02/20/2015; 7:00 pm		Oregon	W 66–64	9–17 (3–12)	Jon M. Huntsman Center (1,008); Salt Lake City, UT
02/22/2015; 12:00 pm, P12N		No. 7 Oregon State	L 42–52	9–18 (3–13)	Jon M. Huntsman Center (788); Salt Lake City, UT
02/27/2015; 6:30 pm		at No. 10 Arizona State	L 42–46	9–19 (3–14)	Wells Fargo Arena (2,405); Tempe, AZ
03/01/2015; 3:00 pm, P12N		at Arizona	L 41–64	9–20 (3–15)	McKale Center (1,201); Tucson, AZ
Pac-12 Women's Tournament
03/05/2015; 9:30 pm, P12N		vs. Washington; First Round	L 64–75	9–21	KeyArena (3,654); Seattle, WA
*Non-conference game. ^{#}Rankings from AP Poll/Coaches' Poll. (#) Tournament seedings in parentheses. All times are in Mountain Time.

== See also ==
- 2014–15 Utah Utes men's basketball team
