= Mike Neighbors =

American college basketball coach (born 1969)

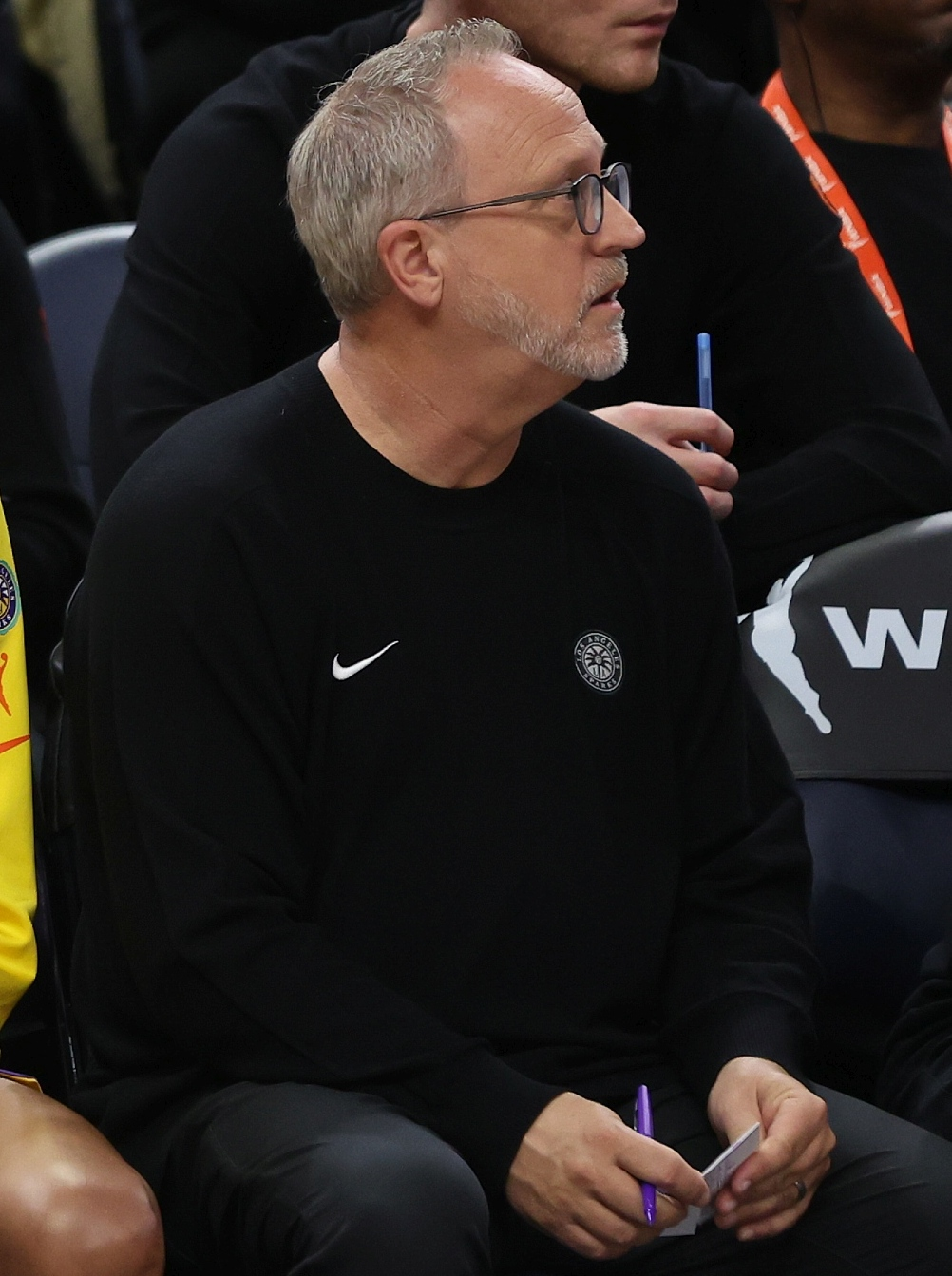
- Neighbors with the Los Angeles Sparks in 2025

Dallas Wings
- Position: Assistant coach
- League: WNBA

Personal information
- Born: March 29, 1969 (age 57) Greenwood, Arkansas, U.S.

Career information
- High school: Greenwood (Greenwood, Arkansas)
- College: Arkansas
- Coaching career: 1994–present

Career history

Coaching
- 1994–1998: Bentonville HS
- 1998–1999: Cabot HS
- 2001–2005: Tulsa (assistant)
- 2005–2006: Colorado (assistant)
- 2006–2007: Arkansas (assistant)
- 2007–2010: Xavier (assistant)
- 2010–2013: Washington (assistant)
- 2013–2017: Washington
- 2017–2025: Arkansas
- 2025: Los Angeles Sparks (assistant)
- 2026 – present: Dallas Wings (assistant)

Career highlights
- NCAA Regional – Final Four (2016)

Michael Earl Neighbors (born March 29, 1969) is an American professional basketball coach who is an assistant coach for the Dallas Wings of the Women's National Basketball Association (WNBA). He previously served as the head coach at Washington and at his alma mater, Arkansas.

== Early years ==
Neighbors was born and raised in Greenwood, Arkansas, where he played basketball at Greenwood High School. His family was very involved in the school system, as teachers, school secretaries, assistant superintendent and superintendent positions. Neighbors completed his associate degree at Westark Community College (now the University of Arkansas – Fort Smith) in 1989 and bachelor's degree at the University of Arkansas in 1993.

== Coaching career ==
In 1994, Neighbors became head girls' basketball coach at Bentonville High School in Bentonville, Arkansas. The team improved from a 1–24 record in his first season to winning at least 18 games in each of the next three seasons and reached the state finals in 1997.

Neighbors then took the same job at Cabot High School in Cabot, Arkansas in 1998 and taught biology at the school also. During his year at Cabot, he was playing pickup basketball. He had bet a high school player he could dunk. He won and played five pickup games that morning. After going home, he was resting on his couch when he experienced a heart attack. Doctors placed two stents in his chest to help with the blood flow, and he was back to coaching the following Friday. However, he decided he had to change his life and he resigned the head coaching position to take an administrative job at the University of Arkansas. The change resulted in a substantial pay cut.

=== College assistant ===
From 1999 to 2001, Neighbors was director of operations for Arkansas Razorbacks women's basketball. Neighbors explains his philosophy: "...be the head coach of whatever they ask you to do." He quickly moved upward to additional responsibilities. Coach Gary Blair asked him to help out with camps, then with viewing opponents' videos to write scouting reports.

After two years as director of basketball operations at Arkansas, Neighbors became an assistant coach at Tulsa under Kathy McConnell-Miller. While an assistant at Tulsa, the school had their best record in school history (19–12) and their first ever post-season invitation.

When McConnell-Miller left to take over the Colorado program, Neighbors continued as her assistant at Colorado.

After one year at Colorado, Susie Gardner persuaded Neighbors to return to Arkansas, this time as a full assistant. The return home did not last long, as Gardner and Arkansas parted ways at the end of the season. Arkansas replaced Gardner with Tom Collen, who chose to bring in his own staff as assistants.

Neighbors was hired by Xavier head coach Kevin McGuff in time for the 2007–08 season. He continued as McGuff's assistant through the 2010–11 season, during which time the Musketeers were 108–22, winning the A10 Conference Tournament three of the four years, making the NCAA tournament each year, and advancing to the Elite Eight in 2010, losing to national runner-up Stanford by just two points. While at Xavier, Neighbors was selected as one of the best assistant coaches in the country. He was chosen as one of five recipients for the BasketballScoop.com and ONS Performance Rising Star award.

McGuff was hired by the Washington Huskies for the 2011–12 season, bringing Neighbors along with him. In their first season under McGuff, the Huskies turned around their 11–17 record from the previous season, improving to 20–14 and making it to the quarterfinals of the WNIT. The next year, the team improved again, finishing 21–12, and finishing 5th in the Pac-12 Conference, their best finish since 2007. However, at the end of McGuff's second season, Ohio State decided to move on from Jim Foster, and persuaded McGuff to take over the head coaching position for the Buckeyes. McGuff, who had signed a three-year contract extension just three weeks earlier, was persuaded to return to his home state.

=== Washington head coach ===
On April 21, 2013, Washington hired Neighbors to be its women's basketball head coach.

In his first year, Washington finished 20–14 (10–8 Pac-12). Among the team's wins was a nationally televised upset of then-No. 3 Stanford at Alaska Airlines Arena that snapped Stanford's 58-game road conference winning streak.

Washington earned its first top-25 ranking since 2003 in Neighbors's second season in 2014–15 and made the NCAA tournament as a #6 seed. In the first round, Washington lost to #11 seed University of Miami.

In the 2015–16 postseason, the Huskies were picked as an at-large bid as a #7 seed in the 2016 NCAA tournament in the Lexington region. After beating #10 seed Penn 65–53, the Huskies upset #2 Maryland on their homecourt 74–65 to advance to the Sweet 16 for the first time since 2001. The Huskies played against #3 Kentucky on their homecourt to defeat the Wildcats 85–72 to advance to the Elite Eight. The Huskies played against their Pac-12 opponent Stanford in the Elite Eight, where the Huskies and Cardinal split the season series. The Huskies led throughout the game and they defeated the Cardinal 85–76 to advance to their first ever Final Four.

=== Arkansas head coach ===
On April 3, 2017, Neighbors was announced as the ninth coach in program history at his alma mater, where he once served as director of basketball operations and as an assistant. His contract is for six years, at $600,000 per year.

His first season was filled with ups and downs, as the team finished 13–18 overall and next to last in the conference. They won their opening round SEC Tournament game over Vanderbilt, before succumbing to former Arkansas coach Gary Blair and his Texas A&M team, 82–52.

In his second season at Arkansas, Neighbors' Razorbacks doubled their SEC wins from the previous year to 6. Neighbors coached his team into the SEC Women's Tournament championship game versus #5 Mississippi State, defeating Georgia, #12 South Carolina, and #15 Texas A&M on consecutive days. But the Razorbacks lost to Mississippi St. Arkansas accepted a bid to the 2019 Women's National Invitation Tournament (WNIT), beating Houston and UAB in the first two rounds at Bud Walton Arena in Fayetteville. Neighbors team lost at home to TCU, 82–78, in the third round, ending their season.

Neighbors entered his fourth season coming off arguably the best season for the Hogs ever in the Southeastern Conference, as his 2019–20 Hogs became one of just two teams to ever win 10 games in the league, while his most recent squad was one of just three Razorback teams in the SEC era to finish above .500 in the league. With their 10–6 record in 2020, the Hogs finished tied for third place in the conference, the best-ever conference finish for Arkansas women’s basketball. If not for the shortened season, Neighbors would have guided his Hogs back to the NCAA Tournament for the first time since 2015.

Arkansas defeated both Baylor and Connecticut at home in his fourth season, the first time the Razorbacks had knocked off two top five teams in the same year. The Razorbacks would earn a #4 seed in the 2021 NCAA Division I women's basketball tournament, but they were upset in the opening round to #13 seed Wright State. This marked the first time since 2014 that a 13-seed upset a 4-seed in the first round of the tournament.

Following the 2020–21 season, Neighbors signed an extension with the Razorbacks through the 2027–28 season. He resigned as head coach on March 11, 2025.

=== WNBA ===
On March 26, 2025, Neighbors was announced as an assistant coach for the Los Angeles Sparks under head coach Lynne Roberts.

On April 3, 2026, Neighbors was announced as an assistant coach for the Dallas Wings.

== Head coaching record ==
Record table
Season	Team	Overall	Conference	Standing	Postseason
Washington Huskies (Pac-12 Conference) (2013–2017)
2013–14	Washington	20–14	10–8	6th	WNIT Quarterfinals
2014–15	Washington	23–10	11–7	5th	NCAA First Round
2015–16	Washington	26–11	11–7	5th	NCAA Final Four
2016–17	Washington	29–6	15–3	T–2nd	NCAA Sweet Sixteen
Washington:		98–41 (.705)	47–25 (.653)		
Arkansas Razorbacks (Southeastern Conference) (2017–2025)
2017–18	Arkansas	13–18	3–13	13th	
2018–19	Arkansas	22–15	6–10	10th	WNIT Third Round
2019–20	Arkansas	24–8	10–6	T–3rd	Postseason cancelled due to the COVID-19 pandemic.
2020–21	Arkansas	19–9	9–6	T–5th	NCAA First Round
2021–22	Arkansas	18–13	7–9	T–8th	NCAA First Round
2022–23	Arkansas	24–13	7–9	8th	WNIT Great Eight
2023–24	Arkansas	18–15	6–10	T–9th	WBIT First Round
2024–25	Arkansas	10–22	3–13	T–13th	
Arkansas:		148–113 (.567)	51–76 (.402)		
Total:		246–154 (.615)			
National champion Postseason invitational champion Conference regular season champion Conference regular season and conference tournament champion Division regular season champion Division regular season and conference tournament champion Conference tournament champion
