= 2015 Pac-12 Conference women's basketball tournament =

- 2015 tournament logo
- Classification: Division I
- Season: 2014–15
- Teams: 12
- Site: KeyArena; Seattle, WA
- Champions: Stanford Cardinal (11th title)
- Winning coach: Tara VanDerveer (11th title)
- MVP: Taylor Greenfield (Stanford)
- Attendance: 26,898
- Television: Pac-12 Network and ESPN

2014–15 Pac-12 Conference women's basketball standings
	Conf.				Overall
Team	W		L	PCT	W		L	PCT
No. 10 Oregon State	16	–	2	.889	27	–	5	.844
No. 9 Arizona State	15	–	3	.833	29	–	6	.829
No. 14 Stanford^{†}	13	–	5	.722	26	–	10	.722
No. 24 California	13	–	5	.722	23	–	10	.697
Washington	11	–	7	.611	23	–	10	.697
UCLA	8	–	10	.444	19	–	18	.514
Washington State	7	–	11	.389	17	–	15	.531
USC	7	–	11	.389	15	–	15	.500
Colorado	6	–	12	.333	15	–	17	.469
Oregon	6	–	12	.333	13	–	17	.433
Arizona	3	–	15	.167	10	–	20	.333
Utah	3	–	15	.167	9	–	22	.290
† 2015 Pac-12 Tournament winner As of April 4, 2015; Rankings from AP Poll

The 2015 Pac-12 Conference women's basketball tournament was the postseason women's basketball tournament at KeyArena in Seattle, Washington from March 5–8, 2015.

== Seeds ==
Teams were seeded by conference record, with ties broken by record between the tied teams followed by record against the regular-season champion, if necessary.

Seed	School	Conf (Overall)	Tiebreaker
#1	Oregon State	16-2 (26-3)	
#2	Arizona State	15-3 (26-4)	
#3	Stanford	13-5 (21-9)	1-1 vs. Cal; 1-0 vs. OSU
#4	California	13-5 (21-8)	1-1 vs. Stanford; 0-1 vs. OSU
#5	Washington	11-7 (22-8)	
#6	UCLA	8-10 (12-17)	
#7	Washington State	7-11 (16-13)	1-0 vs USC
#8	USC	7-11 (15-14)	0-1 vs WSU
#9	Colorado	6-12 (13-16)	1-0 vs Oregon
#10	Oregon	6-12 (13-16)	0-1 vs Colorado
#11	Arizona	3-15 (10-19)	1-1 vs. Utah; 0-2 vs. OSU; 0-2 vs. ASU; 1-3 vs. Cal & Stanford
#12	Utah	3-15 (9-20)	1-1 vs. Arizona; 0-1 vs. OSU; 0-2 vs. ASU; 0-2 vs. Cal & Stanford

== Schedule ==
Thursday-Sunday, March 5–8, 2014

The top four seeds received a first-round bye.

Session	Game	Time*	Matchup^{#}	Television	Attendance
First round – Thursday, March 5
1	1	11:30 AM	#7 Washington State vs. #10 Oregon	P12N	2,907
1	2	2:00 PM	#6 UCLA vs. #11 Arizona	P12N	2,907
2	3	6:00 PM	#8 USC vs. #9 Colorado	P12N	3,654
2	4	8:30 PM	#5 Washington vs. #12 Utah	P12N	3,654
Quarterfinals – Friday, March 6
3	5	11:30 AM	#2 Arizona State vs. #7 Washington State	P12N	3,869
3	5	2:00 PM	#3 Stanford vs. #6 UCLA	P12N	3,869
4	7	6:00 PM	#1 Oregon State vs. #9 Colorado	P12N	5,545
4	8	8:30 PM	#4 California vs. #5 Washington	P12N	5,545
Semifinals – Saturday, March 7
5	9	6:00 PM	#2 Arizona State vs. #3 Stanford	P12N	6,059
5	10	8:30 PM	#9 Colorado vs. #4 California	P12N	6,059
Championship Game – Sunday, March 8
6	11	6:00 PM	#3 Stanford vs. #4 California	ESPN	4,864
*Game Times in PT.

== Bracket ==
First round
8	USC	63
9	Colorado	75
5	Washington	75
12	Utah	64
7	Washington State	66
10	Oregon	64
6	UCLA	80
11	Arizona	62

Quarterfinals
1	#8 Oregon State	65
9	Colorado	68
4	California	69
5	Washington	53
2	#9 Arizona State	67
7	Washington State	48
3	#19 Stanford	67
6	UCLA	62

Semifinals
9	Colorado	55
4	California	68
2	#9 Arizona State	56
3	#19 Stanford	59

Championship game
4	California	60
3	#19 Stanford	61

=== All-Tournament Team ===
Name	Pos.	Year	Team
Sophie Brunner	F	So.	Arizona State
Brittany Boyd	G	Sr.	California
Reshanda Gray	F	Sr.	California
Taylor Greenfield	F	Sr.	Stanford
Lexy Kresl	G	Sr.	Colorado
Amber Orrange	G	Sr.	Stanford

=== Most Outstanding Player ===
Name	Pos.	Year	Team
Taylor Greenfield	F	Sr.	Stanford

== See also ==
2015 Pac-12 Conference men's basketball tournament
