= Beth Burns =

American basketball coach

Current position
- Title: Associate Head coach
- Team: USC
- Conference: Big Ten

Biographical details
- Born: October 7, 1957 (age 69); Chatham, New Jersey, U.S.

Playing career
- 1975–1979: Ohio Wesleyan

Coaching career (HC unless noted)
- 1979–1981: Ohio State (grad. asst.)
- 1981–1983: East Carolina (asst.)
- 1983–1988: Colorado (asst.)
- 1988–1989: NC State (asst.)
- 1989–1997: San Diego State
- 1997–2002: Ohio State
- 2004–2005: Stanford (strength)
- 2005–2013: San Diego State
- 2014–2017: USC (assoc. HC)
- 2017–2022: Louisville (assoc. strength/conditioning)
- 2022–present: USC (assoc. HC)

Accomplishments and honors

Championships
- WNIT (2001); 2× MW Tournament (2010, 2012); 2× MW regular season (2009, 2012); 2× WAC tournament (1994, 1997); 3× WAC regular season (1994, 1995, 1997)

Awards
- 2× MW Coach of the Year (2009, 2012); 3× WAC Coach of the Year (1994, 1995, 1997)

Mary Elizabeth Burns (born October 7, 1957) is an American basketball coach who is currently the women's basketball associate head coach at The University of Southern California. Previously, Burns was the head coach at San Diego State for 1989 to 1997 and from 2005 to 2013 and at Ohio State from 1997 to 2002. With a 295–186 record at San Diego State, Burns has the most career wins in school history. She guided San Diego State to seven NCAA Tournament appearances and earned five Coach of the Year awards combined from the Western Athletic Conference and Mountain West Conference.

== Career ==
Burns played college basketball at Ohio Wesleyan from 1975 to 1979. From 1979 to 1981, while completing her master's degree in physical education, Burns served as a graduate assistant at Ohio State. Burns then was an assistant coach at East Carolina from 1981 to 1983, Colorado from 1983 to 1988, and NC State from 1988 to 1989.

Burns's first tenure as women's basketball head coach at San Diego State was from 1989 to 1997. During these eight seasons, San Diego State appeared in the 1994, 1995, and 1997 NCAA Tournaments, and Burns won Western Athletic Conference Coach of the Year honors in those years as well.

From 1997 to 2002, she served as the head women's basketball coach at Ohio State. Her teams went 81-65 during her tenure, and Ohio State won the 2001 Women's National Invitation Tournament. On March 4, 2002, Ohio State declined to renew Burns's contract, which expired after a 14–15 season in 2001–02.

Burns founded BBHoops, a fitness and basketball instruction business in San Diego, after leaving Ohio State. In 2004, Burns joined Tara VanDerveer's staff at Stanford as strength and conditioning coach.

On April 8, 2005, Burns began her second tenure as head coach at San Diego State. San Diego State formally signed Burns to a five-year contract on August 30, 2005. Inheriting a team that went 8–20, Burns went 3–24 in her first season back in 2005–06, but her teams improved to 12–16 and 18–13 over the next two seasons.

In the 2009 NCAA Women's Tournament, San Diego State was a 10 seed and advanced to the second round. During the 2009–10 season Burns led San Diego State to a 22–10 overall record and a 10–6 record in the Mountain West Conference (MWC), as well as the MWC Tournament Title. That season the team was an 11 seed in the NCAA Women's Tournament with an opening round match-up versus the sixth-seeded Texas Lady Longhorns, with San Diego State winning 74–63.

Eight months after signing a five-year contract, Burns resigned on April 16, 2013.

In 2014, Burns joined USC as associate head coach under Cynthia Cooper-Dyke.

After three seasons at USC, Burns joined Louisville as assistant strength and conditioning coach.

=== Lawsuit against San Diego State ===
On February 19, 2014, Burns filed a wrongful termination lawsuit against San Diego State University, alleging: "SDSU fired her in retaliation for her unwavering demands that SDSU put women’s basketball and men’s athletics on an equal footing." Burns also filed a similar claim against the California State University system in October 2013. Trial began in May 2016. In September 2016, Burns won the lawsuit, with an award of $3.35 million.

== Head coaching record ==
Sources: Ohio State, San Diego State

Record table
| Season | Team | Overall | Conference | Standing | Postseason |
|---|---|---|---|---|---|
San Diego State Aztecs (Big West Conference) (1989–1990)
| 1989–90 | San Diego State | 7–23 | 6–12 | 8th | |
San Diego State Aztecs (Western Athletic Conference) (1990–1997)
| 1990–91 | San Diego State | 14–14 | 6–6 | 4th | |
| 1991–92 | San Diego State | 18–11 | 9–5 | 4th | |
| 1992–93 | San Diego State | 19–9 | 9–5 | T–2nd | NCAA First Round |
| 1993–94 | San Diego State | 26–5 | 13–1 | 1st | NCAA Second Round |
| 1994–95 | San Diego State | 24–6 | 14–0 | 1st | NCAA First Round |
| 1995–96 | San Diego State | 20–8 | 9–5 | 3rd | |
| 1996–97 | San Diego State | 23–7 | 15–1 | 1st | NCAA First Round |
| San Diego State (first): | | 151–83 (.645) | 81–35 (.698) | | |
Ohio State Buckeyes (Big Ten Conference) (1997–2002)
| 1997–98 | Ohio State | 15–12 | 7–9 | 8th | |
| 1998–99 | Ohio State | 17–12 | 9–7 | 4th | NCAA First Round |
| 1999–2000 | Ohio State | 13–15 | 5–11 | T–8th | |
| 2000–01 | Ohio State | 22–11 | 6–12 | T–8th | WNIT Champion |
| 2001–02 | Ohio State | 14–15 | 8–8 | T–5th | |
| Ohio State: | | 81–65 (.555) | 35–47 (.427) | | |
San Diego State Aztecs (Mountain West Conference) (2005–2013)
| 2005–06 | San Diego State | 3–24 | 0–16 | 9th | |
| 2006–07 | San Diego State | 12–16 | 5–11 | 7th | |
| 2007–08 | San Diego State | 18–13 | 7–9 | T–5th | |
| 2008–09 | San Diego State | 24–8 | 13–3 | T–1st | NCAA Second Round |
| 2009–10 | San Diego State | 23–11 | 10–6 | T–3rd | NCAA Sweet 16 |
| 2010–11 | San Diego State | 12–17 | 6–10 | 6th | |
| 2011–12 | San Diego State | 25–7 | 12–2 | 1st | NCAA First Round |
| 2012–13 | San Diego State | 27–7 | 15–1 | 1st | WNIT Second Round |
| San Diego State (second): | | 144–103 (.583) | 68–58 (.540) | | |
| San Diego State (total): | | 295–186 (.613) | | | |
| Total: | | 376–251 (.600) | | | |
National champion Postseason invitational champion Conference regular season champion Conference regular season and conference tournament champion Division regular season champion Division regular season and conference tournament champion Conference tournament champion
