= 2014–15 Eastern Washington Eagles women's basketball team =

Intercollegiate basketball season

2014–15 Eastern Washington Eagles women's basketball

Gator Holiday Classic Champions

WNIT, Second Round
- Conference: Big Sky Conference
- Record: 21–12 (12–6 Big Sky)
- Head coach: Wendy Schuller (14th season)
- Assistant coaches: Jerise Freeman (1st season); Bryce Currie (1st season); Alex Earl (1st season)
- Home arena: Reese Court

2014–15 Big Sky women's basketball standings
	Conf.				Overall
Team	W		L	PCT	W		L	PCT
Montana†	14	–	4	.778	24	–	9	.727
Sacramento State	13	–	5	.722	18	–	16	.529
Eastern Washington	12	–	6	.667	21	–	12	.636
Northern Colorado	12	–	6	.667	22	–	13	.629
North Dakota	9	–	9	.500	17	–	15	.531
Montana State	9	–	9	.500	15	–	15	.500
Northern Arizona	9	–	9	.500	13	–	17	.433
Idaho	8	–	10	.444	14	–	15	.483
Idaho State	8	–	10	.444	13	–	17	.433
Southern Utah	6	–	12	.333	13	–	15	.464
Weber State	6	–	12	.333	11	–	18	.379
Portland State	2	–	16	.111	4	–	25	.138
† 2015 Big Sky tournament winner As of March 26, 2015; Rankings from AP poll

The 2014–15 Eastern Washington Eagles women's basketball team represented Eastern Washington University during the 2014–15 NCAA Division I women's basketball season. The Eagles, were led by fourteenth year head coach Wendy Schuller and played their home games at Reese Court. They were members of the Big Sky Conference. They finished the season 21–12, 12–6 in Big Sky to finish in a tie for third place. They advanced to the semifinals to the Big Sky women's tournament, where they lost to Montana. They were also invited to the Women's National Invitation Tournament, where they defeated Washington State in the first round before losing in the second round to a fellow Big Sky member Sacramento State.

== Roster ==
2014–15 Eastern Washington Eagles women's basketball team
Players
Coaches

Pos.	#	Name	Height	Year	Previous school	Hometown
G	3	Kiana Brown	5 ft 8 in (1.73 m)	Fr	Triangle Lake HS	Triangle Lake, Oregon
G	4	Delaney Hodgins	6 ft 0 in (1.83 m)	Fr	Chiawana HS	Pasco, Washington
F	11	Cece Pearl	5 ft 11 in (1.8 m)	RS So	Peoria HS	Peoria, Arizona
G	13	Lexie Nelson	5 ft 6 in (1.68 m)	RS Sr	Montana; Butte HS	Butte, Montana
G	20	Tisha Phillips	5 ft 9 in (1.75 m)	RS So	Lewiston HS	Lapwai, Idaho
G/F	22	Kayleigh Ryan	5 ft 10 in (1.78 m)	RS Jr	Lynden Christian HS	Lynden, Washington
F	23	Mariah Cunningham	6 ft 0 in (1.83 m)	Fr	Central Valley HS	Spokane, Washington
G	24	Miranda Mielke	5 ft 5 in (1.65 m)	Jr	Davenport HS	Davenport, Washington
G	25	Hayley Hodgins	5 ft 10 in (1.78 m)	RS Jr	Chiawana HS	Pasco, Washington
C	33	Marly Anderson	6 ft 2 in (1.88 m)	So	Glencoe HS	Portland, Oregon
G	34	Jade Redmon	5 ft 7 in (1.7 m)	So	Mead HS	Spokane, Washington
F	35	Haley Shaner	5 ft 11 in (1.8 m)	RS Fr	West Campus HS	Sacramento, California
F	42	Melissa Williams	6 ft 1 in (1.85 m)	Sr	Camas HS	Camas, WA
G	55	Beathany Montgomery	5 ft 9 in (1.75 m)	So	Wilson HS	Tacoma, Washington

Head coach

- Wendy Schuller

Assistant coach(es)

- Jerise Freeman
- Bryce Currie
- Alex Earl

Legend

- (C) Team captain
- (S) Suspended
- (I) Ineligible
- (W) Walk-on
- Injured
- Current redshirt

Roster

== Schedule ==
Date time, TV	Rank^{#}	Opponent^{#}	Result	Record	Site (attendance) city, state
Exhibition
10/30/2014*; 6:00 pm		Central Methodist	W 82–37	–	Reese Court (417); Cheney, Washington
Regular Season
11/14/2014*; 3:30 pm		at Utah Valley	W 68–62	1–0	UCCU Center (312); Orem, Utah
11/18/2014*; 6:00 pm		Wichita State	W 86–58	2–0	Reese Court (653); Cheney, Washington
11/22/2014*; 12:00 pm		at SMU	L 53–69	2–1	Moody Coliseum (N/A); Dallas, Texas
11/24/2014*; 5:00 pm		at Abilene Christian	L 72–79	2–2	Moody Coliseum (724); Abilene, Texas
11/30/2014*; 4:30 pm		Central Washington	W 83–70	3–2	Reese Court (654); Cheney, Washington
12/03/2014*; 6:00 pm, SWX		Gonzaga	L 60–61	3–3	Reese Court (1,877); Cheney, Washington
12/12/2014*; 11:00 am		Saint Martin's	W 69–39	4–3	Reese Court (689); Cheney, Washington
12/14/2014*; 1:00 pm		at Boise State	L 72–90	4–4	Taco Bell Arena (N/A); Boise, Idaho
12/17/2014*; 6:00 pm		Portland	W 72–65	5–4	Reese Court (461); Cheney, Washington
12/21/2014*; 9:00 am		vs. Georgia Southern; Gator Holiday Classic semifinals	W 55–42	6–4	O'Connell Center (N/A); Gainesville, Florida
12/22/2014*; 11:30 am		at Florida; Gator Holiday Classic championship	W 67–56	7–4	O'Connell Center (1,143); Gainesville, Florida
01/01/2015; 6:00 pm		at Weber State	W 69–55	8–4 (1–0)	Dee Events Center (626); Ogden, Utah
01/03/2015; 1:00 pm		at Idaho State	W 88–75	9–4 (2–0)	Reed Gym (907); Pocatello, Idaho
01/10/2015; 2:00 pm		Idaho	W 71–65	10–4 (3–0)	Reese Court (704); Cheney, Washington
01/15/2015; 6:00 pm		Portland State; The Dam Cup	W 101–54	11–4 (4–0)	Reese Court (507); Cheney, Washington
01/17/2015; 2:00 pm		Sacramento State	L 67–73	11–5 (4–1)	Reese Court (617); Cheney, Washington
01/22/2015; 6:00 pm		at Northern Colorado	L 56–64	11–6 (4–2)	Bank of Colorado Arena (640); Greeley, Colorado
01/24/2015; 12:00 pm		at North Dakota	L 82–96	11–7 (4–3)	Betty Engelstad Sioux Center (1,859); Grand Forks, North Dakota
01/31/2015; 2:00 pm		at Idaho	L 58–71	11–8 (4–4)	Cowan Spectrum (672); Moscow, Idaho
02/05/2015; 6:00 pm		Montana	W 65–64	12–8 (5–4)	Reese Court (574); Cheney, Washington
02/07/2015; 2:00 pm		Montana State	W 72–58	13–8 (6–4)	Reese Court (527); Cheney, Washington
02/12/2015; 7:00 pm		at Sacramento State	W 80–79	14–8 (7–4)	Colberg Court (422); Sacramento, California
02/14/2015; 6:00 pm		at Portland State; The Dam Cup	W 77–63	15–8 (8–4)	Stott Center (439); Portland, Oregon
02/19/2015; 6:00 pm		Southern Utah	W 88–67	16–8 (9–4)	Reese Court (488); Cheney, Washington
02/21/2015; 2:00 pm		Northern Arizona	W 73–42	17–8 (10–4)	Reese Court (415); Cheney, Washington
02/26/2015; 6:00 pm		at Montana State	L 53–63	17–9 (10–5)	Worthington Arena (950); Bozeman, Montana
02/28/2015; 1:00 pm		at Montana	L 59–69	17–10 (10–6)	Dahlberg Arena (3,615); Missoula, Montana
03/05/2015; 6:00 pm		Idaho State	W 62–58	18–10 (11–6)	Reese Court (617); Cheney, Washington
03/07/2015; 2:00 pm		Weber State	W 64–62 ^{OT}	19–10 (12–6)	Reese Court (503); Cheney, Washington
Big Sky Women's Tournament
03/11/2015; 4:30 pm	(4)	vs. (5) Northern Arizona; Quarterfinals	W 73–57	20–10	Dahlberg Arena (638); Missoula, Montana
03/13/2015; 12:30 pm	(4)	at (1) Montana; Semifinals	L 51–55	20–11	Dahlberg Arena (2,944); Missoula, Montana
WNIT
03/18/2015*; 7:00 pm		at Washington State; First Round	W 67–65	21–11	Beasley Coliseum (903); Pullman, Washington
03/23/2015*; 7:00 pm		at Sacramento State; Second Round	L 49–84	21–12	Colberg Court (536); Sacramento, California
*Non-conference game. ^{#}Rankings from AP Poll. (#) Tournament seedings in parentheses. All times are in Pacific Time.

== See also ==
- 2014–15 Eastern Washington Eagles men's basketball team
