= 2014–15 Cal State Northridge Matadors women's basketball team =

American college women's basketball season

2014–15 Cal State Northridge Matadors women's basketball
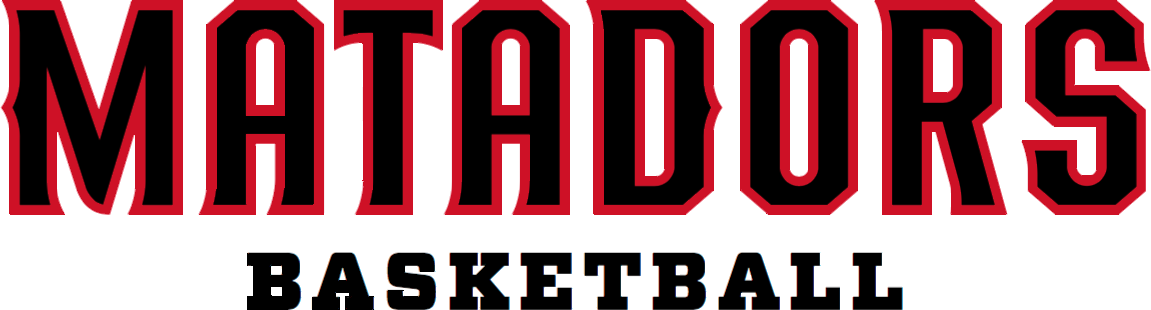

Big West Conference tournament champion

NCAA first round
- Conference: Big West Conference
- Record: 23–10 (11–5 Big West)
- Head coach: Jason Flowers (5th season)
- Associate head coach: Lindsey Foster
- Assistant coaches: Mario Trutanic; Christine Collins-Kiernan
- Home arena: Matadome (Capacity: 2,400)

2014–15 Big West women's basketball standings
	Conf.				Overall
Team	W		L	PCT	W		L	PCT
Hawai'i	14	–	2	.875	23	–	9	.719
Cal State Northridge†	11	–	5	.688	23	–	10	.697
Cal Poly	10	–	6	.625	15	–	13	.536
Long Beach State	9	–	7	.563	22	–	10	.688
UC Riverside	8	–	8	.500	17	–	13	.567
UC Davis	8	–	8	.500	13	–	15	.464
Cal State Fullerton	5	–	11	.313	11	–	18	.379
UC Irvine	5	–	11	.313	8	–	23	.258
UC Santa Barbara	2	–	14	.125	2	–	27	.069
† 2015 Big West tournament winner As of 29 June 2014; Rankings from AP poll

The 2014–15 Cal State Northridge Matadors women's basketball team represented California State University, Northridge during the 2014–15 NCAA Division I women's basketball season. The Matadors, led by fourth-year head coach Jason Flowers, played their games at the Matadome in Northridge, California as members of the Big West Conference. They finished the season 23–10 overall, 11–5 in Big West play, to finish in second place.

== Previous season ==
The Matadors finished the 2013–14 season 18–14 overall (12–4 in Big West), and won both the Big West regular-season and conference tournament. They were eliminated in the first round of the NCAA tournament with a 58–73 loss to South Carolina.

== Roster ==
2014–15 Cal State Northridge Matadors women's basketball team
Players
Coaches

Pos.	#	Name	Height	Year	Previous school	Hometown
G	3	Janae Sharpe	5 ft 7 in (1.7 m)	Sr	Rialto HS	Rialto, CA
C	4	Camille Mahlknecht	6 ft 2 in (1.88 m)	Sr	Agoura HS	Agoura, CA
G	5	Ashlee Guay	5 ft 7 in (1.7 m)	Sr	Academy of Our Lady of Peace	San Diego, CA
F	10	Tessa Boagni	6 ft 2 in (1.88 m)	Fr	Christchurch Girls' HS	Christchurch, New Zealand
G	11	Cinnamon Lister	5 ft 5 in (1.65 m)	RS Sr	Santiago HS Corona (CA); Boise State	Corona, CA
G	14	Emily Cole	5 ft 11 in (1.8 m)	So	West Hills HS	Santee, CA
G	21	Travis Newman	6 ft 0 in (1.83 m)	RS Jr	Chaminade College Prep (CA); Sonoma State	Simi Valley, CA
G	22	Randi Friess	6 ft 0 in (1.83 m)	Sr	Savannah Christian Prep	Savannah, GA
G	23	Serafina Maulupe	5 ft 8 in (1.73 m)	So	Vista Murrieta HS; Virginia Tech	Murrieta, CA
F	31	Caroline Gilling	6 ft 2 in (1.88 m)	Fr	Rungsted Gymnasium	Rungsted Kyst, Denmark
F	35	Jasmine Johnson	6 ft 0 in (1.83 m)	Jr	Canyon Springs HS	Moreno Valley, CA
G	55	Katelin King	5 ft 9 in (1.75 m)	RS Fr	River City HS	West Sacramento, CA

Head coach

- Jason Flowers (UCLA)

Assistant coach(es)

- Lindsey Foster (Northern Arizona)
  Associate head coach
- Mario Trutanic (Antioch)
- Christine Collins-Kiernan (Cal State Fullerton)

Legend

- (C) Team captain
- (S) Suspended
- (I) Ineligible
- (W) Walk-on
- Injured
- Current redshirt

Roster
Last update: October 9, 2024

== Schedule ==
Date time, TV	Rank^{#}	Opponent^{#}	Result	Record	High points	High rebounds	High assists	Site city, state
Exhibition
October 31, 2014*; 6:00 p.m.		The Master's	W 90–56		16 – Lister	7 – Boagni	6 – Sharpe	Matadome; Northridge, CA
Regular season
November 14, 2014*; 2:00 p.m.		Idaho	W 67–50	1–0	25 – Sharpe	10 – Mahlknecht	4 – Lister	Matadome (357); Northridge, CA
November 16, 2014*; 2:00 p.m.		Sacramento State	W 81–66	2–0	20 – Lister	8 – tied	9 – Guay	Matadome (347); Northridge, CA
November 19, 2014*; 11:00 a.m., BYU TV		at BYU	W 63–54	3–0	19 – Guay	10 – Friess	6 – Sharpe	Marriott Center (1,370); Provo, UT
November 21, 2014*; 7:00 p.m.		Portland	W 45–41	4–0	15 – Guay	9 – Mahlknecht	3 – Sharpe	Matadome (486); Northridge, CA
November 28, 2014*; 5:00 p.m.		Montana State; Radisson Chatsworth Hotel Thanksgiving Classic	W 78–66	5–0	24 – Guay	14 – Mahlknecht	3 – tied	Matadome (308); Northridge, CA
November 29, 2014*; 2:30 p.m.		Texas Southern; Radisson Chatsworth Hotel Thanksgiving Classic	W 63–50	6–0	15 – Sharpe	17 – Mahlknecht	5 – Sharpe	Matadome (307); Northridge, CA
December 4, 2014*; 6:00 p.m.		at Saint Mary's	L 63–73	6–1	16 – Guay	10 – Mahlknecht	8 – Sharpe	McKeon Pavilion (299); Moraga, CA
December 6, 2014*; 4:00 p.m.		Pepperdine	W 74–48	7–1	24 – Lister	10 – Mahlknecht	6 – Guay	Matadome (501); Northridge, CA
December 9, 2014*; 6:00 p.m.		at USC	L 74–85 ^{OT}	7–2	19 – tied	7 – Mahlknecht	4 – Guay	Galen Center (399); Los Angeles, CA
December 18, 2014*; 6:30 p.m.		at Northern Arizona	W 77–71	8–2	24 – Guay	10 – Mahlknecht	5 – Guay	Walkup Skydome (254); Flagstaff, AZ
December 20, 2014*; 2:00 p.m.		at San Diego State	W 65–54	9–2	20 – Sharpe	7 – Friess	4 – Guay	Viejas Arena (537); San Diego, CA
December 28, 2014*; 4:00 p.m.		vs. Florida Gulf Coast; Hawk Classic	L 64–73	9–3	22 – Guay	9 – Mahlknecht	4 – Guay	Hagan Arena (1,278); Philadelphia, PA
December 29, 2014*; 11:00 a.m.		at St. Joseph's; Hawk Classic	L 54–61	9–4	12 – Guay	10 – team	8 – Guay	Hagan Arena (1,054); Philadelphia, PA
January 3, 2015*; 2:00 p.m.		at Seattle	W 86–63	10–4	21 – Lister	6 – Sharpe	10 – Guay	Connolly Center (188); Seattle, WA
January 8, 2015; 7:00 p.m.		UC Davis	L 49–60	10–5 (0–1)	19 – Guay	6 – Friess	3 – tied	Matadome (418); Northridge, CA
January 10, 2015; 4:00 p.m.		Hawaii	W 53–46	11–5 (1–1)	16 – Guay	12 – team	2 – tied	Matadome (501); Northridge, CA
January 15, 2015; 7:00 p.m.		UC Santa Barbara	W 84–48	12–5 (2–1)	17 – Boagni	8 – Boagni	7 – Sharpe	Matadome (438); Northridge, CA
January 17, 2015; 4:05 p.m.		Cal Poly	L 54–63	12–6 (2–2)	15 – Lister	13 – Mahlknecht	8 – Guay	Mott Athletics Center (2,047); San Luis Obispo, CA
January 22, 2015; 7:00 p.m.		at UC Irvine	W 72–63	13–6 (3–2)	22 – Guay	15 – Johnson	7 – Sharpe	Bren Events Center (213); Irvine, CA
January 24, 2015; 4:00 p.m.		at Long Beach State	W 67–52	14–6 (4–2)	18 – Guay	13 – Mahlknecht	4 – Guay	Walter Pyramid (1,204); Long Beach, CA
January 29, 2015; 4:00 p.m.		UC Riverside	L 56–68	14–7 (4–3)	15 – Guay	9 – Boagni	4 – Sharpe	Matadome (182); Northridge, CA
January 31, 2015; 5:00 p.m., OC Sports		at Hawaii	L 49–64	14–8 (4–4)	14 – Sharpe	6 – Johnson	3 – Sharpe	Stan Sheriff Center (2,080); Honolulu, HI
February 5, 2015; 7:00 p.m.		at UC Davis	L 67–73	14–9 (4–5)	21 – Guay	10 – Sharpe	6 – Guay	The Pavilion (357); Davis, CA
February 7, 2015; 4:00 p.m.		Cal State Fullerton	W 81–52	15–9 (5–5)	14 – Lister	7 – Johnson	6 – Guay	Matadome (582); Northridge, CA
February 12, 2015; 7:00 p.m.		Cal Poly	W 70–58	16–9 (6–5)	17 – Guay	9 – Johnson	3 – tied	Matadome (550); Northridge, CA
February 14, 2015; 2:00 p.m.		at UC Santa Barbara	W 60–21	17–9 (7–5)	13 – Boagni	8 – Guay	4 – Guay	Thunderdome (311); Santa Barbara, CA
February 21, 2015; 4:00 p.m.		UC Irvine	W 82–60	18–9 (8–5)	18 – Guay	6 – Boagni	5 – tied	Matadome (630); Northridge, CA
February 26, 2015; 7:00 p.m.		at Cal State Fullerton	W 65–53	19–9 (9–5)	15 – Guay	8 – Sharpe	9 – Guay	Titan Gym (259); Fullerton, CA
February 28, 2015; 5:00 p.m.		at UC Riverside	W 88–70	20–9 (10–5)	33 – Guay	7 – Sharpe	6 – Sharpe	SRC Arena (316); Riverside, CA
March 5, 2015; 7:00 p.m.		Long Beach State	W 77–61	21–9 (11–5)	20 – Guay	13 – Guay	8 – Sharpe	Matadome (912); Northridge, CA
Big West tournament
March 13, 2015; 2:30 p.m.	(2)	vs. (5) UC Davis; Semifinals	W 61–47	22–9	21 – Guay	12 – Mahlknecht	6 – Guay	Honda Center (1,126); Anaheim, CA
March 14, 2015; 3:00 p.m.	(2)	vs. (1) Hawaii; Championship	W 67–60	23–9	22 – Guay	9 – team	6 – Guay	Honda Center (1,415); Anaheim, CA
NCAA women's tournament
March 21, 2015*; 3:41 p.m., ESPN2	(13)	at (4) No. 14 Stanford; First round	L 60–73	23–10	27 – Guay	6 – tied	4 – Guay	Maples Pavilion (2,830); Stanford, CA
*Non-conference game. ^{#}Rankings from AP Poll. (#) Tournament seedings in parentheses. All times are in Pacific.
