= 2014–15 Boise State Broncos women's basketball team =

American college basketball season

2014–15 Boise State Broncos women's basketball

Mountain West tournament Champions

NCAA women's tournament, first round
- Conference: Mountain West Conference
- Record: 22–11 (11–7 MWC)
- Head coach: Gordy Presnell (10th season)
- Assistant coaches: Sunny Smallwood; Cody Butler; Heather Sower
- Home arena: Taco Bell Arena

2014–15 Mountain West Conference women's basketball standings
	Conf.				Overall
Team	W		L	PCT	W		L	PCT
Colorado State	15	–	3	.833	23	–	8	.742
New Mexico	14	–	4	.778	21	–	13	.618
Fresno State	13	–	5	.722	23	–	10	.697
Boise State †	11	–	7	.611	21	–	11	.656
Wyoming	10	–	8	.556	16	–	14	.533
UNLV	10	–	8	.556	13	–	17	.433
San Diego State	8	–	10	.444	12	–	19	.387
San Jose State	7	–	11	.389	15	–	17	.469
Nevada	5	–	13	.278	9	–	21	.300
Utah State	5	–	13	.278	8	–	23	.258
Air Force	1	–	17	.056	2	–	28	.067
† 2015 MWC tournament winner Rankings from AP poll

The 2014–15 Boise State Broncos women's basketball team represented Boise State University during the 2014–15 NCAA Division I women's basketball season. The Broncos, led by tenth year head coach Gordy Presnell, played their home games at Taco Bell Arena and were a member of the Mountain West Conference. They finished the season 22–11, 11–7 in Mountain West play for a finish in fourth place. They were also champions of the 2015 Mountain West Conference women's basketball tournament and earn an automatic trip to the 2015 NCAA Division I women's basketball tournament where they lost in the first round to Tennessee.

== Roster ==
2014–15 Boise State Broncos women's basketball team
Players
Coaches

Pos.	#	Name	Height	Year	Previous school	Hometown
G/F	1	Deanna Weaver	5 ft 11 in (1.8 m)	RS Sr	Oregon; Wilcox HS	Santa Clara, CA
F	2	Shalem Shaw	6 ft 1 in (1.85 m)	Fr	Reno HS	Reno, NV
G	3	Tonishia Childress	5 ft 5 in (1.65 m)	So	Bishop Gorman HS	Las Vegas, NV
G	10	Yaiza Rodriguez Ortego	5 ft 5 in (1.65 m)	So	XXXX	Esplugues de Llobregat, Spain
G	11	Hailey Laird	5 ft 5 in (1.65 m)	Sr	Southwestern Oregon CC; Parma HS	Parma, ID
F	12	Kenna McDavis	6 ft 1 in (1.85 m)	So	Pinnacle HS	Phoenix, AZ
F	14	Julia Dufurrena	5 ft 11 in (1.8 m)	Jr	College of Southern Idaho; Lowry HS	Winnemucca, NV
F	15	Lexie Der	6 ft 1 in (1.85 m)	RS Jr	St. Thomas More HS	Burnaby, BC
G	21	Keiahnna Engel	5 ft 7 in (1.7 m)	RS Jr	Dimond HS	Anchorage, AK
C	24	Camille Redmon	6 ft 4 in (1.93 m)	Sr	Purdue; Mansfield Timberview HS	Grand Prairie, TX
C	31	Marijke Vanderschaaf	6 ft 3 in (1.91 m)	Fr	Eastlake HS	Sammamish, WA
C	32	Miquelle Askew	6 ft 3 in (1.91 m)	Jr	Skyline HS	South Jordan, UT
F	33	Kinzi Poteet	6 ft 1 in (1.85 m)	RS Sr	Grandview HS	Grandview, WA
G	40	Brittney Pahukoa	5 ft 7 in (1.7 m)	So	Lake Stevens HS	Lake Stevens, WA
G/F	42	Kayla Reinhart	5 ft 10 in (1.78 m)	Jr	Carroll HS	Southlake, TX
G	44	Brooke Pahukoa	5 ft 9 in (1.75 m)	So	Lake Stevens HS	Lake Stevens, WA

Head coach

- Gordy Presnell

Assistant coach(es)

- Sunny Smallwood
- Cody Butler
- Heather Sower

Legend

- (C) Team captain
- (S) Suspended
- (I) Ineligible
- (W) Walk-on
- Injured
- Current redshirt

Roster

== Schedule ==
Date time, TV	Rank^{#}	Opponent^{#}	Result	Record	Site (attendance) city, state
Exhibition
11/07/2014*; 5:30 pm		Northwest Nazarene	W 84–83	–	Taco Bell Arena (N/A); Boise, ID
Regular Season
11/14/2014*; 7:00 pm		Montana State	W 75–60	1–0	Taco Bell Arena (865); Boise, ID
11/18/2014*; 5:30 pm		New Mexico State	W 70–45	2–0	Taco Bell Arena (N/A); Boise, ID
11/21/2014*; 7:00 pm		at Southern Utah	L 65–66	2–1	Centrum Arena (N/A); Cedar City, UT
11/25/2014*; 8:00 pm		vs. Long Beach State; Great Alaska Shootout semifinals	L 50–68	2–2	Alaska Airlines Center (2,640); Anchorage, AK
11/26/2014*; 4:30 pm		vs. Yale; Great Alaska Shootout 3rd place game	W 59–53 ^{OT}	3–2	Alaska Airlines Center (2,356); Anchorage, AK
11/30/2014*; 2:00 pm		Carroll (Montana)	W 58–45	4–2	Taco Bell Arena (697); Boise, ID
12/04/2014*; 7:00 pm		at Idaho State	W 86–62	5–2	Reed Gym (913); Pocatello, ID
12/06/2014*; 3:00 pm		at Utah Valley	L 60–68	5–3	PE Building (240); Orem, UT
12/10/2014*; 7:00 pm		College of Idaho	W 91–40	6–3	Taco Bell Arena (556); Boise, ID
12/14/2014*; 2:00 pm		Eastern Washington	W 90–72	7–3	Taco Bell Arena (N/A); Boise, ID
12/21/2014*; 2:00 pm		Portland	W 94–58	8–3	Taco Bell Arena (533); Boise, ID
12/31/2014; 11:30 am		Colorado State	W 75–65	9–3 (1–0)	Taco Bell Arena (549); Boise, ID
01/03/2015; 2:00 pm		at Utah State	W 63–53	10–3 (2–0)	Smith Spectrum (404); Logan, UT
01/10/2015; 2:00 pm		Wyoming	L 59–64	10–4 (2–1)	Taco Bell Arena (936); Boise, ID
01/14/2015; 8:00 pm		at UNLV	W 78–67	11–4 (3–1)	Cox Pavilion (884); Paradise, NV
01/17/2015; 2:00 pm		New Mexico	W 86–65	12–4 (4–1)	Taco Bell Arena (925); Boise, ID
01/21/2015; 8:00 pm		at San Jose State	L 78–88	12–5 (4–2)	Event Center Arena (822); San Jose, CA
01/24/2015; 2:00 pm		Air Force	W 81–54	13–5 (5–2)	Taco Bell Arena (824); Boise, ID
01/28/2015; 7:00 pm		at Colorado State	L 82–83	13–6 (5–3)	Moby Arena (1,191); Fort Collins, CO
02/04/2015; 7:00 pm		Utah State	W 94–55	14–6 (6–3)	Taco Bell Arena (694); Boise, ID
02/07/2015; 3:00 pm		at San Diego State	L 40–57	14–7 (6–4)	Viejas Arena (1,538); San Diego, CA
02/11/2015; 7:00 pm		at Air Force	W 88–69	15–7 (7–4)	Clune Arena (209); Colorado Springs, CO
02/14/2015; 2:00 pm		Fresno State	W 75–66 ^{OT}	16–7 (8–4)	Taco Bell Arena (1,007); Boise, ID
02/18/2015; 7:00 pm		UNLV	L 60–74	16–8 (8–5)	Taco Bell Arena (774); Boise, ID
02/21/2015; 5:00 pm		at Nevada	W 51–47	17–8 (9–5)	Lawlor Events Center (1,313); Reno, NV
02/25/2015; 7:00 pm		at New Mexico	L 50–63	17–9 (9–6)	The Pit (6,591); Albuquerque, NM
02/28/2015; 2:00 pm		San Diego State	W 64–58	18–9 (10–6)	Taco Bell Arena (851); Boise, ID
03/03/2015; 7:00 pm		San Jose State	W 91–76	19–9 (11–6)	Taco Bell Arena (789); Boise, ID
03/06/2015; 8:00 pm		at Fresno State	L 52–55 ^{OT}	19–10 (11–7)	Save Mart Center (3,016); Fresno, CA
Mountain West Women's Tournament
03/10/2015; 3:30 pm, MWN		vs. UNLV; Quarterfinals	W 64–46	20–10	Thomas & Mack Center (1,457); Paradise, NV
03/11/2015; 7:00 pm, MWN		vs. San Jose State; Semifinals	W 76–67	21–10	Thomas & Mack Center (N/A); Paradise, NV
03/13/2015; 1:00 pm, MWN		vs. New Mexico; Championship Game	W 66–60	22–10	Thomas & Mack Center (5,195); Paradise, NV
NCAA Women's Tournament
03/21/2015*; 11:30 am, ESPN2		at No. 6 Tennessee; First Round	L 61–72	22–11	Thompson–Boling Arena (6,439); Knoxville, TN
*Non-conference game. ^{#}Rankings from AP Poll. (#) Tournament seedings in parentheses. All times are in Mountain Time.

== See also ==
2014–15 Boise State Broncos men's basketball team
