= 2014–15 Idaho Vandals women's basketball team =

Intercollegiate basketball season

2014–15 Idaho Vandals women's basketball
- Conference: Big Sky Conference
- Record: 14–15 (8–10 Big Sky)
- Head coach: Jon Newlee (7th season)
- Assistant coaches: Christa Stanford (1st season); Kristi Zeller (7th season); Miranda Forry (3rd season)
- Home arena: Cowan Spectrum; Memorial Gym

2014–15 Big Sky women's basketball standings
	Conf.				Overall
Team	W		L	PCT	W		L	PCT
Montana†	14	–	4	.778	24	–	9	.727
Sacramento State	13	–	5	.722	18	–	16	.529
Eastern Washington	12	–	6	.667	21	–	12	.636
Northern Colorado	12	–	6	.667	22	–	13	.629
North Dakota	9	–	9	.500	17	–	15	.531
Montana State	9	–	9	.500	15	–	15	.500
Northern Arizona	9	–	9	.500	13	–	17	.433
Idaho	8	–	10	.444	14	–	15	.483
Idaho State	8	–	10	.444	13	–	17	.433
Southern Utah	6	–	12	.333	13	–	15	.464
Weber State	6	–	12	.333	11	–	18	.379
Portland State	2	–	16	.111	4	–	25	.138
† 2015 Big Sky tournament winner As of March 26, 2015; Rankings from AP poll

The 2014–15 Idaho Vandals women's basketball team represented the University of Idaho during the 2014–15 NCAA Division I women's basketball season. The Vandals, led by seventh year head coach Jon Newlee, played their home games at the Cowan Spectrum with a couple of early season games at Memorial Gym, and were members of the Big Sky Conference. This was their first year returning to the Big Sky, the conference they were charter members of and called home from 1988–1996. They finished the season 14–15, 8–10 in Big Sky play to finish in a tie for eighth place. They failed to qualify for the Big Sky women's tournament.

== Roster ==
2014–15 Idaho Vandals women's basketball team
Players
Coaches

Pos.	#	Name	Height	Year	Previous school	Hometown
G	1	Christina Salvatore	5 ft 11 in (1.8 m)	Jr	Canyon HS	Anaheim, CA
G	2	Karlee Wilson	5 ft 4 in (1.63 m)	So	Lewiston HS	Lewiston, ID
F	4	Brooke Reilly	6 ft 1 in (1.85 m)	So	Mt. Spokane HS	Spokane, WA
G	10	Stacey Barr	5 ft 8 in (1.73 m)	Sr	Maribyrnong College	Melbourne, Australia
F	11	Tayla Corrigan	6 ft 2 in (1.88 m)	Jr	Mineral Area College	Adelaide, Australia
C	12	Nejra Solo	6 ft 5 in (1.96 m)	RS Fr	PRVA Gimnazija Zenica	Zenica, Bosnia
F	13	Ali Forde	6 ft 2 in (1.88 m)	Jr	Woodinville HS	Woodinville, WA
G/F	14	Maren Austgulen	6 ft 0 in (1.83 m)	Sr	Pinewood Prep	Bergen, Norway
G	22	Bethany Krause	5 ft 8 in (1.73 m)	Fr	Centerville HS	Centerville, OH
G/F	23	Ranae Mokrzycki	6 ft 0 in (1.83 m)	Jr	North Idaho College	Melbourne, Australia
G/F	31	Geraldine McCorkell	6 ft 0 in (1.83 m)	Fr	Penleigh & Essendon Grammar	Melbourne, Australia
G	32	Agueda Trujillo	6 ft 0 in (1.83 m)	So	IES CTEIB	Manacor, Spain
G	35	Connie Ballestero	5 ft 9 in (1.75 m)	Jr	Villa Park HS	Orange, CA

Head coach

- Jon Newlee

Assistant coach(es)

- Christa Stanford
- Kristi Zeller
- Miranda Forry

Legend

- (C) Team captain
- (S) Suspended
- (I) Ineligible
- (W) Walk-on
- Injured
- Current redshirt

Roster

== Schedule ==
Date time, TV	Rank^{#}	Opponent^{#}	Result	Record	Site (attendance) city, state
Exhibition
11/04/2014*; 6:00 pm		Central Washington	W 73–37	–	Memorial Gym (352); Moscow, ID
Regular Season
11/14/2014*; 2:00 pm		at Cal State Northridge	L 50–67	0–1	Matadome (357); Northridge, CA
11/17/2014*; 7:00 pm		at UC Santa Barbara	W 47–44	1–1	The Thunderdome (457); San Barbara, CA
11/22/2014*; 2:00 pm		San Diego	L 52–58	1–2	Memorial Gym (346); Moscow, ID
11/25/2014*; 6:00 pm		at Wyoming	W 77–66	2–2	Arena-Auditorium (3,269); Laramie, WY
11/29/2014*; 1:00 pm		at Seattle	W 65–50	3–2	Connolly Center (267); Seattle, WA
12/04/2014*; 11:00 am		at No. 17 Oregon State	L 53–75	3–3	Gill Coliseum (7,537); Corvallis, OR
12/07/2014*; 2:00 pm		Multnomah	W 104–19	4–3	Cowan Spectrum (422); Moscow, ID
12/10/2014*; 5:00 pm		at No. 9 Baylor	L 70–88	4–4	Ferrell Center (5,437); Waco, TX
12/13/2014*; 11:30 am		at Toledo; Glass City Tournament semifinals	L 67–80	4–5	Savage Arena (3,410); Toledo, OH
12/14/2014*; 9:00 am		vs. Southeast Missouri State; Glass City Tournament 3rd place game	W 78–62	5–5	Savage Arena (N/A); Toledo, OH
12/20/2014*; 7:00 pm		Lewis–Clark State	W 74–48	6–5	Cowan Spectrum (632); Moscow, ID
01/01/2015; 6:00 pm		at Idaho State	L 50–71	6–6 (0–1)	Reed Gym (879); Pocatello, ID
01/03/2015; 1:00 pm		at Weber State	W 67–60	7–6 (1–1)	Dee Events Center (673); Ogden, UT
01/10/2015; 2:00 pm		at Eastern Washington	L 65–71	7–7 (1–2)	Reese Court (704); Cheney, WA
01/15/2015; 6:00 pm		Sacramento State	L 89–107	7–8 (1–3)	Cowan Spectrum (591); Moscow, ID
01/17/2015; 2:00 pm		Portland State	W 77–49	8–8 (2–3)	Cowan Spectrum (578); Moscow, ID
01/22/2015; 5:00 pm		at North Dakota	L 62–68	8–9 (2–4)	Betty Engelstad Sioux Center (1,769); Grand Forks, ND
01/24/2015; 1:00 pm		at Northern Colorado	L 52–70	8–10 (2–5)	Bank of Colorado Arena (799); Greeley, CO
01/31/2015; 2:00 pm		Eastern Washington	W 71–58	9–10 (3–5)	Cowan Spectrum (672); Moscow, ID
02/05/2015; 7:00 pm		Montana State	L 65–76	9–11 (3–6)	Cowan Spectrum (579); Moscow, ID
02/07/2015; 2:00 pm		Montana	L 74–87	9–12 (3–7)	Cowan Spectrum (751); Moscow, ID
02/12/2015; 7:00 pm		at Portland State	W 69–49	10–12 (4–7)	Stott Center (327); Portland, OR
02/14/2015; 2:00 pm		at Sacramento State	L 84–92	10–13 (4–8)	Colberg Court (370); Sacramento, CA
02/19/2015; 6:00 pm		Northern Arizona	W 78–43	11–13 (5–8)	Cowan Spectrum (489); Moscow, ID
02/21/2015; 2:00 pm		Southern Utah	W 76–49	12–13 (6–8)	Cowan Spectrum (548); Moscow, ID
02/26/2015; 6:00 pm		at Montana	L 68–81	12–14 (6–9)	Dahlberg Arena (3,741); Missoula, MT
02/28/2015; 1:00 pm		at Montana State	L 62–71	12–15 (6–10)	Worthington Arena (784); Bozeman, MT
03/05/2015; 6:00 pm		Weber State	W 71–42	13–15 (7–10)	Cowan Spectrum (522); Moscow, ID
03/07/2015; 2:00 pm		Idaho State	W 77–53	14–15 (8–10)	Cowan Spectrum (523); Moscow, ID
*Non-conference game. ^{#}Rankings from AP Poll. (#) Tournament seedings in parentheses. All times are in Pacific Time.

== See also ==
2014–15 Idaho Vandals men's basketball team
