= 2014–15 Montana Lady Griz basketball team =

Intercollegiate basketball season

2014–15 Montana Lady Griz basketball

Big Sky Regular Season & Tournament Champions

NCAA Women's Tournament, first round
- Conference: Big Sky Conference
- Record: 24–9 (14–4 Big Sky)
- Head coach: Robin Selvig (37th season)
- Assistant coaches: Shannon Schweyen (23rd season); Trish Duce (21st season); Sonya Rogers (2nd season)
- Home arena: Dahlberg Arena

2014–15 Big Sky women's basketball standings
	Conf.				Overall
Team	W		L	PCT	W		L	PCT
Montana†	14	–	4	.778	24	–	9	.727
Sacramento State	13	–	5	.722	18	–	16	.529
Eastern Washington	12	–	6	.667	21	–	12	.636
Northern Colorado	12	–	6	.667	22	–	13	.629
North Dakota	9	–	9	.500	17	–	15	.531
Montana State	9	–	9	.500	15	–	15	.500
Northern Arizona	9	–	9	.500	13	–	17	.433
Idaho	8	–	10	.444	14	–	15	.483
Idaho State	8	–	10	.444	13	–	17	.433
Southern Utah	6	–	12	.333	13	–	15	.464
Weber State	6	–	12	.333	11	–	18	.379
Portland State	2	–	16	.111	4	–	25	.138
† 2015 Big Sky tournament winner As of March 26, 2015; Rankings from AP poll

The 2014–15 Montana Lady Griz basketball team represented the University of Montana during the 2014–15 NCAA Division I women's basketball season. The Lady Griz, led by thirty-seventh year head coach Robin Selvig, played their home games at Dahlberg Arena and were members of the Big Sky Conference. They finished the season 24–9, 14–4 in Big Sky play to win the Big Sky Regular Season Championship. They were also champions of the 2015 Big Sky Conference women's basketball tournament and earned an automatic trip to the 2015 NCAA Division I women's basketball tournament, where they lost to Notre Dame in the first round.

== Roster ==
2014–15 Montana Lady Griz women's basketball team
Players
Coaches

Pos.	#	Name	Height	Year	Previous school	Hometown
G	00	Maddie Keast	5 ft 9 in (1.75 m)	Fr	Sentinel HS	Missoula, Montana
G	3	Haley Vining	5 ft 7 in (1.7 m)	RS Jr	Charles M. Russell HS	Great Falls, Montana
G	4	Sierra Anderson	5 ft 6 in (1.68 m)	Fr	Henry M. Jackson HS	Mill Creek, WA
G	5	McCalle Feller	5 ft 10 in (1.78 m)	Jr	Fergus HS	Lewistown, Montana
F	10	Kayleigh Valley	5 ft 11 in (1.8 m)	So	University HS	Spokane, Washington
F	11	Rachel Staudacher	6 ft 1 in (1.85 m)	RS So	Cedar Park Christian	Bothell, Washington
G	12	Kellie Rubel	5 ft 9 in (1.75 m)	RS Sr	Bozeman HS	Bozeman, Montana
F	13	Alycia Sims	6 ft 3 in (1.91 m)	So	Stevensville HS	Stevensville, Montana
G	20	Hannah Doran	5 ft 11 in (1.8 m)	RS Jr	Crescent Valley HS	Corvallis, Oregon
F	22	Mekayla Isaak	6 ft 1 in (1.85 m)	RS Fr	Bend HS	Bend, Oregon
F	24	Carly Selvig	6 ft 3 in (1.91 m)	RS Sr	Dawson County HS	Glendive, Montana
F	32	Maggie Rickman	6 ft 0 in (1.83 m)	Sr	Capital HS	Helena, Montana
G	42	Shanae Gilham	5 ft 10 in (1.78 m)	RS So	Bozeman HS	Browning, Montana

Head coach

- Robin Selvig

Assistant coach(es)

- Shannon Schweyen
- Trish Duce
- Sonya Rogers

Legend

- (C) Team captain
- (S) Suspended
- (I) Ineligible
- (W) Walk-on
- Injured
- Current redshirt

Roster

== Schedule ==
Date time, TV	Rank^{#}	Opponent^{#}	Result	Record	Site (attendance) city, state
Exhibition
11/04/2014*; 7:00 pm		Great Falls	W 88–63	–	Dahlberg Arena (2,321); Missoula, Montana
11/07/2014*; 7:00 pm		Minot State	W 75–46	–	Dahlberg Arena (N/A); Missoula, Montana
Regular Season
11/17/2014*; 7:00 pm		Montana–Western	W 55–44	1–0	Dahlberg Arena (2,462); Missoula, Montana
11/21/2014*; 8:00 pm		at Pacific	L 50–62	1–1	Alex G. Spanos Center (404); Stockton, California
11/27/2014*; 4:00 pm		vs. Charlotte; Cancún Challenge Mayan Division	W 67–58	2–1	Hard Rock Resort (650); Playa del Carmen, Mexico
11/28/2014*; 4:00 pm		vs. Princeton; Cancún Challenge Mayan Division	L 55–80	2–2	Hard Rock Resort (650); Playa del Carmen, Mexico
11/29/2014*; 4:00 pm		vs. Wake Forest; Cancún Challenge Mayan Division	L 60–73	2–3	Hard Rock Resort (650); Playa del Carmen, Mexico
12/04/2014*; 7:00 pm		Wyoming	L 54–60	2–4	Dahlberg Arena (2,573); Missoula, Montana
12/07/2014*; 2:00 pm		Carroll (Montana)	W 64–34	3–4	Dahlberg Arena (2,495); Missoula, Montana
12/14/2014*; 3:00 pm		at Portland	W 69–55	4–4	Chiles Center (269); Portland, Oregon
12/17/2014*; 3:00 pm		at Seattle	W 70–64 ^{OT}	5–4	Connolly Center (146); Seattle, Washington
12/19/2014*; 7:30 pm		Utah Valley; 34th Lady Griz Classic semifinals	W 68–44	6–4	Dahlberg Arena (2,469); Missoula, Montana
12/20/2014*; 8:00 pm		Austin Peay; 34th Lady Griz Classic championship	W 83–62	7–4	Dahlberg Arena (2,564); Missoula, Montana
01/01/2015; 2:00 pm		at Northern Colorado	W 64–58	8–4 (1–0)	Bank of Colorado Arena (440); Greeley, Colorado
01/03/2015; 1:00 pm		at North Dakota	L 52–59	8–5 (1–1)	Betty Engelstad Sioux Center (1,606); Grand Forks, North Dakota
01/08/2015; 7:00 pm		Weber State	W 53–43	9–5 (2–1)	Dahlberg Arena (2,712); Missoula, Montana
01/10/2015; 2:00 pm		Idaho State	W 77–65	10–5 (3–1)	Dahlberg Arena (3,108); Missoula, Montana
01/17/2015; 2:00 pm		Montana State	W 62–48	11–5 (4–1)	Dahlberg Arena (3,535); Missoula, Montana
01/22/2015; 7:00 pm		at Northern Arizona	W 69–42	12–5 (5–1)	Walkup Skydome (408); Flagstaff, Arizona
01/24/2015; 7:00 pm		at Southern Utah	W 59–37	13–5 (6–1)	Centrum Arena (674); Cedar City, Utah
01/29/2015; 7:00 pm		Portland State	W 72–31	14–5 (7–1)	Dahlberg Arena (2,834); Missoula, Montana
01/31/2015; 2:00 pm		Sacramento State	W 94–86	15–5 (8–1)	Dahlberg Arena (3,301); Missoula, Montana
02/05/2015; 7:00 pm		at Eastern Washington	L 64–65	15–6 (8–2)	Reese Court (574); Cheney, Washington
02/07/2015; 3:00 pm		at Idaho	W 87–74	16–6 (9–2)	Cowan Spectrum (751); Moscow, Idaho
02/12/2015; 7:00 pm		North Dakota	W 66–51	17–6 (10–2)	Dahlberg Arena (3,137); Missoula, Montana
02/14/2015; 2:00 pm		Northern Colorado	L 51–52	17–7 (10–3)	Dahlberg Arena (3,220); Missoula, Montana
02/19/2015; 7:00 pm		at Idaho State	W 69–51	18–7 (11–3)	Reed Gym (880); Pocatello, Idaho
02/21/2015; 2:00 pm		at Weber State	W 64–60	19–7 (12–3)	Dee Events Center (963); Ogden, Utah
02/26/2015; 7:00 pm		Idaho	W 81–68	20–7 (13–3)	Dahlberg Arena (3,741); Missoula, Montana
02/28/2015; 2:00 pm		Eastern Washington	W 69–59	21–7 (14–3)	Dahlberg Arena (3,615); Missoula, Montana
03/07/2015; 2:00 pm		at Montana State	L 57–65	21–8 (14–4)	Worthington Arena (2,506); Bozeman, Montana
Big Sky Women's Tournament
03/11/2015; 8:00 pm		Idaho State; Quarterfinals	W 69–67	22–8	Dahlberg Arena (2,914); Missoula, Montana
03/13/2015; 1:30 pm		Eastern Washington; Semifinals	W 55–51	23–8	Dahlberg Arena (2,944); Missoula, Montana
03/14/2015; 2:00 pm		Northern Colorado; Championship Game	W 60–49	24–8	Dahlberg Arena (3,811); Missoula, Montana
NCAA Women's Tournament
03/20/2015*; 5:30 pm, ESPN2		at No. 2 Notre Dame; First Round	L 43–77	24–9	Edmund P. Joyce Center (6,198); South Bend, Indiana
*Non-conference game. ^{#}Rankings from AP Poll. (#) Tournament seedings in parentheses. All times are in Mountain Time.

== See also ==
2014–15 Montana Grizzlies basketball team
