= 2014–15 New Mexico Lobos women's basketball team =

Intercollegiate basketball season

2014–15 New Mexico Lobos women's basketball

WBI, Quarterfinals
- Conference: Mountain West Conference
- Record: 21–13 (14–4 Mountain West)
- Head coach: Yvonne Sanchez (4th season)
- Assistant coaches: Joseph Anders; Anthony Turner; Amy Beggin
- Home arena: The Pit; Johnson Gymnasium

2014–15 Mountain West Conference women's basketball standings
	Conf.				Overall
Team	W		L	PCT	W		L	PCT
Colorado State	15	–	3	.833	23	–	8	.742
New Mexico	14	–	4	.778	21	–	13	.618
Fresno State	13	–	5	.722	23	–	10	.697
Boise State †	11	–	7	.611	21	–	11	.656
Wyoming	10	–	8	.556	16	–	14	.533
UNLV	10	–	8	.556	13	–	17	.433
San Diego State	8	–	10	.444	12	–	19	.387
San Jose State	7	–	11	.389	15	–	17	.469
Nevada	5	–	13	.278	9	–	21	.300
Utah State	5	–	13	.278	8	–	23	.258
Air Force	1	–	17	.056	2	–	28	.067
† 2015 MWC tournament winner Rankings from AP poll

The 2014–15 New Mexico Lobos women's basketball team represented the University of New Mexico during the 2014–15 NCAA Division I women's basketball season. The Lobos, led by fourth year head coach Yvonne Sanchez. They played their home games at The Pit and were members of the Mountain West Conference. They finished the season 21–13, 14–4 in Mountain West play to finish in second place. They advanced to the championship game of the Mountain West Conference women's basketball tournament where they lost to Boise State. They were invited to the Women's Basketball Invitational where they defeated North Dakota in the first round before losing to Oral Roberts in the quarterfinals.

== Roster ==
2014–15 New Mexico Lobos women's basketball team
Players
Coaches

Pos.	#	Name	Height	Year	Previous school	Hometown
G	0	Cherise Beynon	5 ft 10 in (1.78 m)	Fr	Canyon Springs HS	Las Vegas, NV
G	1	Brooke Allemand	5 ft 4 in (1.63 m)	So	Boerne-Samuel V. Champion HS	Fair Oaks Ranch, TX
G	2	Kenya Pye	5 ft 8 in (1.73 m)	Fr	Maclay Prep	Tallahassee, FL
F	3	Josie Greenwood	5 ft 11 in (1.8 m)	So	Rosny College	Hobart, Australia
G	4	Alex Lapeyrolerie	5 ft 11 in (1.8 m)	So	Edward S. Marcus HS	Highland Village, TX
F	11	Alexa Chavez	6 ft 0 in (1.83 m)	Jr	St. Michael's HS	Santa Fe, NM
G	12	Bryce Owens	5 ft 4 in (1.63 m)	Jr	DeSoto HS	DeSoto, TX
F	13	Khadijah Shumpert	6 ft 0 in (1.83 m)	Jr	Benilde St. Margaret's HS	Minneapolis, MN
G	15	Antiesha Brown	5 ft 10 in (1.78 m)	RS Sr	Clovis HS; Texas Tech	Clovis, NM
G	21	Marissa Perry (W)	5 ft 4 in (1.63 m)	So	Hope Christian HS	Albuquerque, NM
G	24	Jayda Bovero	5 ft 11 in (1.8 m)	Fr	Syracuse HS	Farr West, UT
G	25	Laneah Bryan	5 ft 6 in (1.68 m)	Fr	Franklin HS	El Paso, TX
G	31	Brea Mitchell	5 ft 10 in (1.78 m)	Jr	Plano West HS	Plano, TX
F	32	Kianna Keller	6 ft 4 in (1.93 m)	So	Waukesha West HS	Waukesha, WI
C	33	Maddie Muraida (W)	6 ft 2 in (1.88 m)	Sr	Albuquerque Acad.	Albuquerque, NM

Head coach

Yvonne Sanchez

Assistant coach(es)

Joseph Anders
Anthony Turner
Amy Beggin

Legend

- (C) Team captain
- (S) Suspended
- (I) Ineligible
- (W) Walk-on
- Injured
- Current redshirt

Roster

== Schedule and results ==
Date time, TV	Rank^{#}	Opponent^{#}	Result	Record	Site (attendance) city, state
Exhibition
11/09/2014*; 2:00 pm		Eastern New Mexico	W 61–49	–	The Pit (5,204); Albuquerque, NM
Non-conference regular season
11/14/2014*; 2:30 pm		vs. Texas–Pan American; Maggie Dixon Classic	L 59–61	0–1	McGrath-Phillips Arena (N/A); Chicago, IL
11/15/2014*; 3:00 pm		vs. No. 5 Texas A&M; Maggie Dixon Classic	L 52–66	0–2	McGrath-Phillips Arena (N/A); Chicago, IL
11/16/2014*; 3:30 pm		at No. 18 DePaul; Maggie Dixon Classic	L 59–97	0–3	McGrath-Phillips Arena (2,139); Chicago, IL
11/24/2014*; 7:00 pm		No. 5 Stanford	L 65–70	0–4	The Pit (6,594); Albuquerque, NM
11/28/2014*; 7:00 pm		Boston University; Thanksgiving Tournament	W 56–49	1–4	The Pit (5,387); Albuquerque, NM
11/29/2014*; 7:00 pm		UC Riverside; Thanksgiving Tournament	L 62–70	1–5	The Pit (5,325); Albuquerque, NM
12/03/2014*; 6:00 pm, LHN		at No. 4 Texas	L 37–86	1–6	Frank Erwin Center (2,350); Austin, TX
12/07/2014*; 2:00 pm		at New Mexico State; Rio Grande Rivalry	L 59–70	1–7	Pan American Center (401); Las Cruces, NM
12/14/2014*; 2:00 pm		UTEP	W 72–57	2–7	The Pit (5,328); Albuquerque, NM
12/18/2014*; 7:00 pm		Cal Poly	W 84–68	3–7	The Pit (4,869); Albuquerque, NM
12/21/2014*; 1:00 pm		Northern Arizona	W 56–37	4–7	The Pit (5,144); Albuquerque, NM
Mountain West Regular Season
12/31/2014; 3:00 pm		at Fresno State	L 65–71	4–8 (0–1)	Save Mart Center (2,270); Fresno, CA
01/03/2015; 2:00 pm		at Colorado State	L 38–44	4–9 (0–2)	Moby Arena (1,178); Fort Collins, CO
01/07/2015; 7:00 pm		San Diego State	W 62–53	5–9 (1–2)	The Pit (4,929); Albuquerque, NM
01/10/2015; 2:00 pm		Utah State	W 60–59	6–9 (2–2)	The Pit (5,521); Albuquerque, NM
01/14/2015; 7:00 pm		at Air Force	W 70–47	7–9 (3–2)	Clune Arena (233); Colorado Springs, CO
01/17/2015; 2:00 pm		at Boise State	L 65–86	7–10 (3–3)	Taco Bell Arena (925); Boise, ID
01/21/2015; 7:00 pm		UNLV	W 63–60	8–10 (4–3)	The Pit (5,553); Albuquerque, NM
01/24/2015; 2:00 pm		Wyoming	W 60–54	9–10 (5–3)	The Pit (5,650); Albuquerque, NM
01/31/2015; 3:00 pm		at San Jose State	W 64–62	10–10 (6–3)	Event Center Arena (367); San Jose, CA
02/04/2015; 7:00 pm		Air Force	W 69–46	11–10 (7–3)	The Pit (5,098); Albuquerque, NM
02/07/2015; 2:00 pm		at Utah State	W 56–51	12–10 (8–3)	Smith Spectrum (457); Logan, UT
02/11/2015; 7:00 pm		Colorado State	W 67–40	13–10 (9–3)	The Pit (5,388); Albuquerque, NM
02/14/2015; 2:00 pm		Nevada	W 63–45	14–10 (10–3)	The Pit (6,598); Albuquerque, NM
02/18/2015; 7:00 pm		at San Diego State	W 63–47	15–10 (11–3)	Viejas Arena (411); San Diego, CA
02/21/2015; 3:00 pm		at UNLV	L 73–79	15–11 (11–4)	Cox Pavilion (1,311); Paradise, NV
02/25/2015; 7:00 pm		Boise State	W 63–50	16–11 (12–4)	The Pit (6,591); Albuquerque, NM
02/28/2015; 2:00 pm		Fresno State	W 63–60	17–11 (13–4)	The Pit (6,558); Albuquerque, NM
03/06/2015; 2:00 pm		at Wyoming	W 66–55	18–11 (14–4)	Arena-Auditorium (3,349); Laramie, WY
Mountain West Women's Tournament
03/10/2015; 7:00 pm, MWN		vs. San Diego State; Quarterfinals	W 57–56	19–11	Thomas & Mack Center (1,838); Paradise, NV
03/11/2015; 9:30 pm, MWN		vs. Fresno State; Semifinals	W 64–53	20–11	Thomas & Mack Center (3,188); Paradise, NV
03/13/2015; 1:00 pm, MWN		vs. Boise State; Championship Game	L 60–66	20–12	Thomas & Mack Center (5,195); Paradise, NV
WBI
03/18/2015*; 7:00 pm		North Dakota; First Round	W 54–51	21–12	Johnson Gymnasium (1,471); Albuquerque, NM
03/23/2015*; 7:00 pm		Oral Roberts; Quarterfinals	L 61–63	21–13	Johnson Gymnasium (1,845); Albuquerque, NM
*Non-conference game. ^{#}Rankings from AP Poll. (#) Tournament seedings in parentheses. All times are in Mountain Time.

== See also ==
- 2014–15 New Mexico Lobos men's basketball team
