= 2014–15 San Jose State Spartans women's basketball team =

Intercollegiate basketball season

2014–15 San Jose State Spartans women's basketball
- Conference: Mountain West Conference
- Record: 15–17 (7–11 Mountain West)
- Head coach: Jamie Craighead (2nd season)
- Assistant coaches: Dan Muscatell; Jourdan Willard; Mia Fisher
- Home arena: Event Center Arena

2014–15 Mountain West Conference women's basketball standings
	Conf.				Overall
Team	W		L	PCT	W		L	PCT
Colorado State	15	–	3	.833	23	–	8	.742
New Mexico	14	–	4	.778	21	–	13	.618
Fresno State	13	–	5	.722	23	–	10	.697
Boise State †	11	–	7	.611	21	–	11	.656
Wyoming	10	–	8	.556	16	–	14	.533
UNLV	10	–	8	.556	13	–	17	.433
San Diego State	8	–	10	.444	12	–	19	.387
San Jose State	7	–	11	.389	15	–	17	.469
Nevada	5	–	13	.278	9	–	21	.300
Utah State	5	–	13	.278	8	–	23	.258
Air Force	1	–	17	.056	2	–	28	.067
† 2015 MWC tournament winner Rankings from AP poll

The 2014–15 San Jose State Spartans women's basketball team represented San José State University during the 2014–15 NCAA Division I women's basketball season. The Spartans, led by second-year head coach Jamie Craighead, played their home games at the Event Center Arena and were members of the Mountain West Conference.

== Roster ==
2014–15 San Jose State Spartans women's basketball team
Players
Coaches

Pos.	#	Name	Height	Year	Previous school	Hometown
G	1	Myzhanique Ladd	5 ft 8 in (1.73 m)	Fr	Cleveland HS	Seattle, WA
G	2	Nyre Harris	5 ft 8 in (1.73 m)	Jr	Lincoln HS; U of Arizona	Stockton, CA
F	3	Paris Baird	6 ft 2 in (1.88 m)	RS So	Windward School	Van Nuys, CA
F	5	Ali Bettencourt	5 ft 10 in (1.78 m)	Fr	Oak Ridge HS	El Dorado Hills, CA
PG	10	Aniya Baker	5 ft 8 in (1.73 m)	RS So	Perris HS; UC Davis	Perris, CA
F	11	Jasmine Smith	6 ft 0 in (1.83 m)	So	Bellarmine-Jefferson HS	Burbank, CA
C	12	Emily Schill	6 ft 2 in (1.88 m)	RS So	Box Hill Secondary	Tecoma, Australia
G	20	Rachol West	5 ft 10 in (1.78 m)	So	Garces Memorial HS	Bakersfield, CA
PG	21	Dezz Ramos (I) (redshirt)	5 ft 7 in (1.7 m)	Jr	Hunter HS; Weber State	West Valley, UT
PG	22	Chereese Thomas	5 ft 8 in (1.73 m)	RS Sr	Dublin HS; Ohlone CC	Dublin, CA
F	24	Ellie Stevens	6 ft 0 in (1.83 m)	RS Jr	Geelong College; Idaho State; Lamar CC	Ocean Grove, Australia
F	32	Emily Vann	6 ft 0 in (1.83 m)	RS Jr	Saint Mary's College HS; UC Davis	Martinez, CA
F	33	Rebecca Woodberry	5 ft 10 in (1.78 m)	Sr	Tolleson Union HS; U of Nebraska	Phoenix, AZ
G	34	Ta'rea Cunnigan (C)	5 ft 9 in (1.75 m)	Sr	Chaparral HS	Winchester, CA
C	44	Riana Byrd	6 ft 2 in (1.88 m)	Jr	Inderkum HS	Richmond, CA

Head coach

- Jamie Craighead

Assistant coach(es)

- Dan Muscatell
- Jourdan Willard
- Mia Fisher

Legend

- (C) Team captain
- (S) Suspended
- (I) Ineligible
- (W) Walk-on
- Injured
- Current redshirt

Roster
Last update: April 1, 2016

== Schedule ==
Date time, TV	Rank^{#}	Opponent^{#}	Result	Record	Site (attendance) city, state
Exhibition
11/09/2014*; 2:00 pm		UC Santa Cruz	W 90–53		Event Center Arena (441); San Jose, CA
Non-conference regular season
11/14/2014*; 4:00 pm		at Utah	L 87–100 ^{OT}	0–1	Jon M. Huntsman Center (694); Salt Lake City, UT
11/16/2014*; 3:30 pm		Columbia	W 119–76	1–1	Event Center Arena (1,453); San Jose, CA
11/20/2014*; 2:00 pm		at UC Riverside	L 80–100 ^{OT}	1–2	UC Riverside Student Recreation Center (162); Riverside, CA
11/22/2014*; 7:00 pm		at UC Irvine	W 91–65	2–2	Bren Events Center (316); Irvine, CA
11/28/2014*; 5:30 pm	No. 14	at California; Cal Classic	L 87–110	2–3	Haas Pavilion (2,309); Berkeley, CA
11/29/2014*; 5:00 pm		vs. Cincinnati; Cal Classic	W 79–54	3–3	Haas Pavilion; Berkeley, CA
12/02/2014*; 7:00 pm		Southern Oregon	W 110–91	4–3	Event Center Arena (227); San Jose, CA
12/05/2014*; 10:00 am		at Colorado	L 89–97 ^{OT}	4–4	Coors Events Center (1,903); Boulder, CO
12/10/2014*; 7:00 pm		UC Davis	W 89–75	5–4	Event Center Arena (413); San Jose, CA
12/20/2014*; 2:00 pm		San Francisco	L 62–77	5–5	War Memorial Gymnasium (306); San Francisco, CA
12/22/2014*; 2:00 pm		Sacramento State	W 102–94	6–5	Event Center Arena (553); San Jose, CA
Mountain West regular season
12/31/2014; 7:00 pm		Utah State	W 62–58	7–5 (1–0)	Event Center Arena (288); San Jose, CA
01/03/2015; 1:00 pm		at Wyoming	L 60–96	7–6 (1–1)	Arena-Auditorium (3,004); Laramie, WY
01/07/2015; 7:00 pm		Air Force	W 91–64	8–6 (2–1)	Event Center Arena (274); San Jose, CA
01/10/2015; 1:00 pm		UNLV	L 68–72 ^{2}	8–7 (2–2)	Event Center Arena (416); San Jose, CA
01/14/2015; 7:05 pm		at Fresno State; Rivalry	L 46–58	8–8 (2–3)	Save Mart Center (2,231); Fresno, CA
01/17/2015; 11:00 am		Colorado State	L 59–77	8–9 (2–4)	Moby Arena (1,246); Fort Collins, CO
01/21/2015; 7:00 pm		Boise State	W 88–78	9–9 (3–4)	Event Center Arena (822); San Jose, CA
01/28/2015; 6:00 pm		at Air Force	L 57–71	9–10 (3–5)	Clune Arena (149); Colorado Springs, CO
01/31/2015; 2:00 pm		New Mexico	L 62–64	9–11 (3–6)	Event Center Arena (367); San Jose, CA
02/04/2015; 7:00 pm		Fresno State; Rivalry	W 56–51	10–11 (4–6)	Event Center Arena (623); San Jose, CA
02/07/2015; 4:00 pm		at Nevada	W 80–77 ^{2OT}	11–11 (5–6)	Lawlor Events Center (1,067); Reno, NV
02/14/2015; 2:00 pm		Wyoming	L 61–71	11–12 (5–7)	Event Center Arena (566); San Jose, CA
02/18/2015; 6:00 pm		at Utah State	L 80–85	11–13 (5–8)	Smith Spectrum (382); Logan, UT
02/21/2015; 2:00 pm		at San Diego State	L 61–71	11–14 (5–9)	Viejas Arena (711); San Diego, CA
02/25/2015; 7:00 pm		Colorado State	L 76–85	11–15 (5–10)	Event Center Arena (361); San Jose, CA
02/28/2015; 2:00 pm		Nevada	W 81–72	12–15 (6–10)	Event Center Arena (734); San Jose, CA
03/03/2015; 6:10 pm		Boise State	L 76–91	12–16 (6–11)	Taco Bell Arena (789); Boise, ID
03/06/2015; 5:00 pm		at UNLV	W 99–97	13–16 (7–11)	Cox Pavilion (870); Las Vegas, NV
Mountain West Women's Tournament
03/09/2015; 2:00 pm	(8)	vs. (9) Utah State; First Round	W 99–85	14–16	Thomas & Mack Center (1,838); Paradise, NV
03/10/2015; 12:00 pm	(8)	vs. (1) Colorado State; Quarterfinals	W 64–55	15–16	Thomas & Mack Center (1,457); Paradise, NV
03/11/2015; 6:00 pm	(8)	vs. (4) Boise State; Semifinals	L 67–76	15–17	Thomas & Mack Center (3,188); Paradise, NV
*Non-conference game. ^{#}Rankings from AP Poll. (#) Tournament seedings in parentheses. All times are in Pacific Time.
