= 2015 Big West Conference women's basketball tournament =

- Classification: Division I
- Season: 2014–15
- Teams: 8
- Site: Titan Gym; Honda Center; Fullerton, CA; Anaheim, CA
- Champions: Cal State Northridge (2nd title)
- Winning coach: Jason Flowers (2nd title)
- Television: ESPN3; FS PRIME/FCS Pacific

2014–15 Big West women's basketball standings
	Conf.				Overall
Team	W		L	PCT	W		L	PCT
Hawai'i	14	–	2	.875	23	–	9	.719
Cal State Northridge†	11	–	5	.688	23	–	10	.697
Cal Poly	10	–	6	.625	15	–	13	.536
Long Beach State	9	–	7	.563	22	–	10	.688
UC Riverside	8	–	8	.500	17	–	13	.567
UC Davis	8	–	8	.500	13	–	15	.464
Cal State Fullerton	5	–	11	.313	11	–	18	.379
UC Irvine	5	–	11	.313	8	–	23	.258
UC Santa Barbara	2	–	14	.125	2	–	27	.069
† 2015 Big West tournament winner As of 29 June 2014; Rankings from AP poll

The 2015 Big West Conference women's basketball tournament took place March 10–14, 2015. The first two rounds occurred at Titan Gym while the semifinals and championship were at the Honda Center in Anaheim, California. The winner of the tournament received the conference's automatic bid to the 2015 NCAA Women's Division I Basketball Tournament.

Cal State Northridge defeated Hawaii in the championship game.

== Format ==
The top eight teams qualified for the 2015 Big West tournament. Seeds 1 and 2 received a double-bye while seeds 3 and 4 received a single bye. The first round featured 5 vs. 8 and 6 vs. 7. The lowest seed from round 1 moved on to play seed 3 in the quarterfinals while the other winner moved on to play seed 4 in the quarterfinals. The semifinals once again had the lowest seed from the quarterfinals move on to play seed 1 while the other remaining seed played seed 2 in the semifinals.

== Bracket ==
First round Tuesday, March 10; ESPN3
6	UC Riverside	59
7	Cal State Fullerton	71
5	UC Davis	80
8	UC Irvine	71

Quarterfinals (Re-Seeded); Wednesday, March 11; ESPN3
3	Cal Poly	48
7	Cal State Fullerton	55
4	Long Beach State	67
5	UC Davis	70

Semifinals (Re-Seeded); Friday, March 13; ESPN3
1	Hawaii	73
7	Cal State Fullerton	64
2	Cal State Northridge	61
5	UC Davis	47

Championship game Saturday, March 14; FS PRIME/FCS Pacific
1	Hawaii	60
2	Cal State Northridge	67

== See also ==
- 2015 Big West Conference men's basketball tournament
