= 2014–15 Portland State Vikings women's basketball team =

American college basketball season

2014–15 Portland State Vikings women's basketball
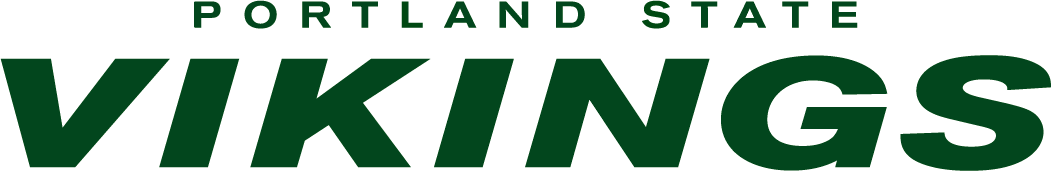
- Conference: Big Sky Conference
- Record: 4–25 (2–16 Big Sky)
- Head coach: Sherri Murrell (first 24 games, 8th year); Jennifer Mountain (interim HC)
- Assistant coaches: Jennifer Mountain; Jennifer Wassom; Chris Lehecka
- Home arena: Stott Center

2014–15 Big Sky women's basketball standings
	Conf.				Overall
Team	W		L	PCT	W		L	PCT
Montana†	14	–	4	.778	24	–	9	.727
Sacramento State	13	–	5	.722	18	–	16	.529
Eastern Washington	12	–	6	.667	21	–	12	.636
Northern Colorado	12	–	6	.667	22	–	13	.629
North Dakota	9	–	9	.500	17	–	15	.531
Montana State	9	–	9	.500	15	–	15	.500
Northern Arizona	9	–	9	.500	13	–	17	.433
Idaho	8	–	10	.444	14	–	15	.483
Idaho State	8	–	10	.444	13	–	17	.433
Southern Utah	6	–	12	.333	13	–	15	.464
Weber State	6	–	12	.333	11	–	18	.379
Portland State	2	–	16	.111	4	–	25	.138
† 2015 Big Sky tournament winner As of March 26, 2015; Rankings from AP poll

The 2014–15 Portland State Vikings women's basketball team represented Portland State University during the 2014–15 NCAA Division I women's basketball season. The Vikings, led by eighth year head coach Sherri Murrell, played their home games at the Peter Stott Center and were members of the Big Sky Conference. After a 3–21 start to the season, head coach Sherri Murrell was fired. Assistant coach Jennifer Mountain was named the Vikings interim head coach for the remainder of the season. They finished the season 4–25, 2–16 in Big Sky play to finish in last place. They failed to qualify for the Big Sky women's tournament.

== Roster ==
2014–15 Portland State Vikings women's basketball team
Players
Coaches

Pos.	#	Name	Height	Year	Previous school	Hometown
F	1	Danah Haley	6 ft 0 in (1.83 m)	So	Fairfax HS; Blue Mountain CC	Los Angeles, California
G	3	Nele Aha	5 ft 7 in (1.7 m)	Fr	Hainberg-Gymnasium	Göttingen, Germany
G	4	Ani Avenessian	5 ft 9 in (1.75 m)	Sr	Monroe HS	San Fernando Valley, California
G	5	Lauren Holt	5 ft 11 in (1.8 m)	So	Leigh HS	San Jose, California
C	10	Cara Olden	6 ft 1 in (1.85 m)	GS	Tumwater HS	Tumwater, Washington
F	11	Cici West	5 ft 10 in (1.78 m)	Fr	Holy Names Acad.	Seattle, Washington
G	20	Lariel Powell	5 ft 8 in (1.73 m)	Sr	Bishop O'Dowd HS	Hayward, California
C	21	Alicia Carline	6 ft 3 in (1.91 m)	Jr	Freyberg HS; Gillette College	Feilding, New Zealand
G	22	Emily Easom	5 ft 10 in (1.78 m)	Jr	Marin Catholic HS	San Rafael, California
G	23	Yaremi Mejia (redshirt)	5 ft 7 in (1.7 m)	So	South Medford HS	Medford, Oregon
F	32	Mikaela Rivard	5 ft 11 in (1.8 m)	Sr	Chiawana HS	Tri-Cities, Washington
C	44	Shelby Sanders	6 ft 2 in (1.88 m)	Fr	Hermiston HS	Hermiston, Oregon
C	45	Katie O'Brien	6 ft 1 in (1.85 m)	Sr	Monarch HS	Louisville, Colorado
G		Montana Walters (redshirt)	5 ft 4 in (1.63 m)	So	Oregon City HS; Santa Clara	Oregon City, Oregon

Head coach

- Sherri Murrell (Pepperdine)

Assistant coach(es)

- Jennifer Mountain (Gonzaga)
- Jennifer Wassom (Portland)
- Chris Lehecka (Kansas State)

Legend

- (C) Team captain
- (S) Suspended
- (I) Ineligible
- (W) Walk-on
- Injured
- Current redshirt

Roster

== Schedule ==
Date time, TV	Rank^{#}	Opponent^{#}	Result	Record	Site (attendance) city, state
Exhibition
11/02/2014*; 5:00 pm		George Fox	W 71–69	–	Stott Center (392); Portland, Oregon
11/08/2014*; 5:00 pm		Lewis & Clark	W 74–56	–	Stott Center (344); Portland, Oregon
Regular season
11/16/2014*; 5:00 pm		at Seattle	L 47–54	0–1	Connolly Center (331); Seattle, Washington
11/19/2014*; 7:00 pm		South Dakota	L 57–86	0–2	Stott Center (275); Portland, Oregon
11/22/2014*; 2:00 pm		Corban	L 64–74	0–3	Stott Center (156); Portland, Oregon
11/25/2014*; 6:00 pm		at Oregon	L 56–63	0–4	Matthew Knight Arena (1,256); Eugene, Oregon
11/29/2014*; 1:00 pm		Long Beach State	L 58–62	0–5	Stott Center (208); Portland, Oregon
12/05/2014*; 7:00 pm		Navy	W 56–50	1–5	Stott Center (221); Portland, Oregon
12/07/2014*; 2:00 pm		at Gonzaga	L 41–73	1–6	McCarthey Athletic Center (5,204); Spokane, Washington
12/12/2014*; 7:00 pm		at Portland	L 63–91	1–7	Chiles Center (288); Portland, Oregon
12/14/2014*; 2:00 pm		Western Washington	L 64–75	1–8	Stott Center (221); Portland, Oregon
12/19/2014*; 2:30 pm		at Princeton	L 33–104	1–9	Jadwin Gymnasium (645); Princeton, New Jersey
12/21/2014*; 9:00 am		at Columbia	W 71–66	2–9	Levien Gymnasium (251); New York City, New York
01/01/2015; 6:00 pm		at Southern Utah	L 74–86	2–10 (0–1)	Centrum Arena (449); Cedar City, Utah
01/03/2015; 1:00 pm		at Northern Arizona	L 46–94	2–11 (0–2)	Walkup Skydome (169); Flagstaff, Arizona
01/08/2015; 7:00 pm		Northern Colorado	L 54–68	2–12 (0–3)	Stott Center (248); Portland, Oregon
01/10/2015; 2:00 pm		North Dakota	W 73–70	3–12 (1–3)	Stott Center (208); Portland, Oregon
01/15/2015; 6:00 pm		at Eastern Washington; The Dam Cup	L 54–101	3–13 (1–4)	Reese Court (507); Cheney, Washington
01/17/2015; 2:00 pm		at Idaho	L 49–77	3–14 (1–5)	Cowan Spectrum (578); Moscow, Idaho
01/22/2015; 7:00 pm		Weber State	L 51–60	3–15 (1–6)	Stott Center (418); Portland, Oregon
01/24/2015; 7:00 pm		Idaho State	L 53–65	3–16 (1–7)	Stott Center (381); Portland, Oregon
01/29/2015; 6:00 pm		at Montana	L 31–72	3–17 (1–8)	Dahlberg Arena (2,834); Missoula, Montana
01/31/2015; 1:00 pm		at Montana State	L 46–63	3–18 (1–9)	Worthington Arena (936); Bozeman, Montana
02/07/2015; 7:00 pm		Sacramento State	L 60–92	3–19 (1–10)	Stott Center (429); Portland, Oregon
02/12/2015; 7:00 pm		Idaho	L 49–69	3–20 (1–11)	Stott Center (327); Portland, Oregon
02/14/2015; 2:00 pm		Eastern Washington; The Dam Cup	L 63–77	3–21 (1–12)	Stott Center (439); Portland, Oregon
02/19/2015; 5:00 pm		at North Dakota	L 45–76	3–22 (1–13)	Betty Engelstad Sioux Center (1,609); Grand Forks, North Dakota
02/21/2015; 1:00 pm		at Northern Colorado	L 50–90	3–23 (1–14)	Bank of Colorado Arena (623); Greeley, Colorado
02/28/2015; 12:00 pm		at Sacramento State	L 77–123	3–24 (1–15)	Colberg Court (380); Sacramento, California
03/05/2015; 7:00 pm		Northern Arizona	L 62–79	3–25 (1–16)	Stott Center (355); Portland, Oregon
03/07/2015; 7:00 pm		Southern Utah	W 80–65	4–25 (2–16)	Stott Center (436); Portland, Oregon
*Non-conference game. ^{#}Rankings from AP Poll. (#) Tournament seedings in parentheses. All times are in Pacific Time.

== See also ==
2014–15 Portland State Vikings men's basketball team
