= 2014–15 Wyoming Cowgirls basketball team =

Intercollegiate basketball season

2014–15 Wyoming Cowgirls basketball
- Conference: Mountain West Conference
- Record: 16–14 (10–8 Mountain West)
- Head coach: Joe Legerski (12th season)
- Assistant coaches: Gerald Mattinson; Katie Kern; Mike Petrino
- Home arena: Arena-Auditorium

2014–15 Mountain West Conference women's basketball standings
	Conf.				Overall
Team	W		L	PCT	W		L	PCT
Colorado State	15	–	3	.833	23	–	8	.742
New Mexico	14	–	4	.778	21	–	13	.618
Fresno State	13	–	5	.722	23	–	10	.697
Boise State †	11	–	7	.611	21	–	11	.656
Wyoming	10	–	8	.556	16	–	14	.533
UNLV	10	–	8	.556	13	–	17	.433
San Diego State	8	–	10	.444	12	–	19	.387
San Jose State	7	–	11	.389	15	–	17	.469
Nevada	5	–	13	.278	9	–	21	.300
Utah State	5	–	13	.278	8	–	23	.258
Air Force	1	–	17	.056	2	–	28	.067
† 2015 MWC tournament winner Rankings from AP poll

The 2014–15 Wyoming Cowgirls basketball team represented University of Wyoming in the 2014–15 college basketball season. The Cowgirls, led by twelfth year head coach Joe Legerski, played their home games at the Arena-Auditorium and were members of the Mountain West Conference. They finished the season 16–14, 10–8 in Mountain West play for a tie to finish in fifth place. They advance to the quarterfinals of the 2015 Mountain West Conference women's basketball tournament, where they lost to Fresno State in the quarterfinals.

== Roster ==
2014–15 Wyoming Cowgirls women's basketball team
Players
Coaches

Pos.	#	Name	Height	Year	Previous school	Hometown
F	4	Kayla Woodward	5 ft 11 in (1.8 m)	Sr	Sheridan HS	Sherdian, WY
G	5	Jasmine Davis	5 ft 9 in (1.75 m)	Jr	Sheridan College; Sacred Heart College	Petone, New Zealand
G	10	Marquelle Dent	5 ft 7 in (1.7 m)	Jr	Regis Jesuit HS	Denver, CO
G	13	Liv Roberts	5 ft 11 in (1.8 m)	Fr	Sentinel HS	Missoula, MT
F	14	Natalie Baker	6 ft 0 in (1.83 m)	Fr	Chaparral HS	Parker, CO
G	22	Jordan Kelly	6 ft 0 in (1.83 m)	RS Jr	Washington State; Campbell County HS	Gillette, WY
F	23	Bailee Cotton	6 ft 2 in (1.88 m)	Fr	Denver School S&T	Denver, CO
G	24	Skylar Snodgrass	5 ft 10 in (1.78 m)	Fr	Andover Central HS	Wichita, KS
G	31	Kaitlyn Mileto	5 ft 10 in (1.78 m)	Sr	Mesa Ridge HS	Colorado Springs, CO
G	33	Hailey Ligocki	5 ft 8 in (1.73 m)	So	Sheridan HS	Sherdian, WY
F	40	Jordan Sibrel	6 ft 1 in (1.85 m)	Sr	Thompson Valley HS	Loveland, CO
F	42	Marleah Campbell	6 ft 2 in (1.88 m)	Fr	Shawnee Mission West HS	Lenexa, KS
C	45	Kaylie Rader	6 ft 4 in (1.93 m)	So	Horizon HS	Thornton, CO

Head coach

- Joe Legerski

Assistant coach(es)

- Gerald Mattinson
- Katie Kern
- Mike Petrino

Legend

- (C) Team captain
- (S) Suspended
- (I) Ineligible
- (W) Walk-on
- Injured
- Current redshirt

Roster

== Schedule ==
Date time, TV	Rank^{#}	Opponent^{#}	Result	Record	Site (attendance) city, state
Non-conference regular season
11/17/2014*; 7:00 pm		Western State	W 104–29	1–0	Arena-Auditorium (3,873); Laramie, WY
11/21/2014*; 7:00 pm		Denver	W 82–41	2–0	Arena-Auditorium (4,081); Laramie, WY
11/25/2014*; 7:00 pm		Idaho	L 66–77	2–1	Arena-Auditorium (3,269); Laramie, WY
11/28/2014*; 1:00 pm		vs. Iowa State; St. Mary's Hilton Concord Thanksgiving Classic	L 63–84	2–2	McKeon Pavilion (151); Moraga, CA
11/29/2014*; 1:00 pm		vs. Howard; St. Mary's Hilton Concord Thanksgiving Classic	W 67–53	3–2	McKeon Pavilion (151); Moraga, CA
12/04/2014*; 7:00 pm		at Montana	W 60–54	4–2	Dahlberg Arena (2,573); Missoula, MT
12/06/2014*; 5:00 pm		at Montana State	L 52–79	4–3	Worthington Arena (848); Bozeman, MT
12/10/2014*; 7:00 pm		South Dakota Tech	W 77–41	5–3	Arena-Auditorium (2,809); Laramie, WY
12/12/2014*; 7:00 pm		Gonzaga	L 56–70	5–4	Arena-Auditorium (3,620); Laramie, WY
12/21/2014*; 2:00 pm		at Colorado	L 71–76	5–5	Coors Events Center (2,371); Boulder, CO
Mountain West Regular Season
12/31/2014; 3:00 pm		at UNLV	L 55–58	5–6 (0–1)	Cox Pavilion (852); Paradise, NV
01/03/2015; 2:00 pm		San Jose State	W 96–60	6–6 (1–1)	Arena-Auditorium (3,004); Laramie, WY
01/07/2015; 7:00 pm		Colorado State; Border War	L 55–58	6–7 (1–2)	Arena-Auditorium (2,955); Laramie, WY
01/10/2015; 2:00 pm		at Boise State	W 64–59	7–7 (2–2)	Taco Bell Arena (936); Boise, ID
01/14/2015; 7:00 pm		at San Diego State	L 54–57	7–8 (2–3)	Viejas Arena (341); San Diego, CA
01/17/2015; 2:00 pm		Fresno State	L 65–66	7–9 (2–4)	Arena-Auditorium (3,055); Laramie, WY
01/24/2015; 2:00 pm		at New Mexico	L 54–60	7–10 (2–5)	The Pit (5,650); Albuquerque, NM
01/28/2015; 7:00 pm		Utah State	W 86–51	8–10 (3–5)	Arena-Auditorium (2,861); Laramie, WY
01/31/2015; 5:00 pm		at Nevada	W 61–45	9–10 (4–5)	Lawlor Events Center (1,068); Reno, NV
02/04/2015; 6:00 pm		at Colorado State; Border War	L 58–67	9–11 (4–6)	Moby Arena (1,786); Fort Collins, CO
02/07/2015; 2:00 pm		Air Force	W 74–51	10–11 (5–6)	Arena-Auditorium (3,220); Laramie, WY
02/11/2015; 7:00 pm		San Diego State	W 74–66	11–11 (6–6)	Arena-Auditorium (2,898); Laramie, WY
02/14/2015; 3:00 pm		at San Jose State	W 71–61	12–11 (7–6)	Event Center Arena (566); San Jose, CA
02/18/2015; 7:00 pm		Nevada	W 77–54	13–11 (8–6)	Arena-Auditorium (2,854); Laramie, WY
02/25/2015; 8:00 pm		at Fresno State	L 50–67	13–12 (8–7)	Save Mart Center (2,333); Fresno, CA
02/28/2015; 2:00 pm		UNLV	W 99–68	14–12 (9–7)	Arena-Auditorium (3,338); Laramie, WY
03/03/2015; 7:00 pm		at Utah State	W 61–57	15–12 (10–7)	Smith Spectrum (571); Logan, UT
03/06/2015; 2:00 pm		New Mexico	L 55–66	15–13 (10–8)	Arena-Auditorium (3,349); Laramie, WY
Mountain West tournament
03/09/2015; 8:00 pm, MWN	(6)	vs. (11) Air Force; First Round	W 70–48	16–13	Thomas & Mack Center (1,838); Paradise, NV
03/10/2015; 9:30 pm, MWN	(6)	vs. (3) Fresno State; Quarterfinals	L 66–74	16–14	Thomas & Mack Center (3,015); Paradise, NV
*Non-conference game. ^{#}Rankings from AP Poll. (#) Tournament seedings in parentheses. All times are in Mountain Time. All dates, times and TV are tentative and subject to change.

== See also ==
- 2014–15 Wyoming Cowboys basketball team
