= 2014–15 Idaho State Bengals women's basketball team =

Intercollegiate basketball season

2014–15 Idaho State Bengals women's basketball
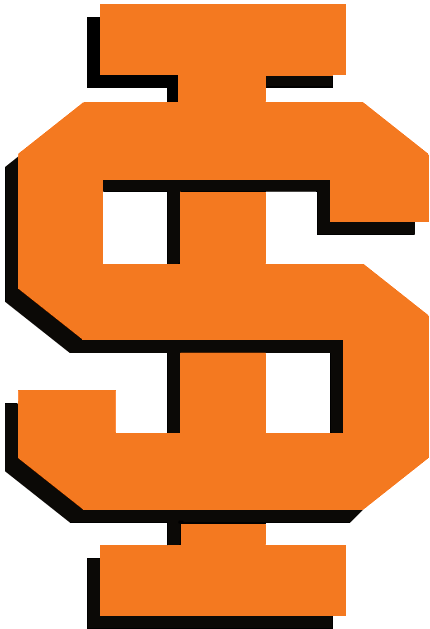
- Conference: Big Sky Conference
- Record: 13–17 (8–10 Big Sky)
- Head coach: Seton Sobolewski (7th season)
- Assistant coaches: Mike Trujillo; Ryan Johnson; Andrea Videbeck
- Home arena: Reed Gym

2014–15 Big Sky women's basketball standings
	Conf.				Overall
Team	W		L	PCT	W		L	PCT
Montana†	14	–	4	.778	24	–	9	.727
Sacramento State	13	–	5	.722	18	–	16	.529
Eastern Washington	12	–	6	.667	21	–	12	.636
Northern Colorado	12	–	6	.667	22	–	13	.629
North Dakota	9	–	9	.500	17	–	15	.531
Montana State	9	–	9	.500	15	–	15	.500
Northern Arizona	9	–	9	.500	13	–	17	.433
Idaho	8	–	10	.444	14	–	15	.483
Idaho State	8	–	10	.444	13	–	17	.433
Southern Utah	6	–	12	.333	13	–	15	.464
Weber State	6	–	12	.333	11	–	18	.379
Portland State	2	–	16	.111	4	–	25	.138
† 2015 Big Sky tournament winner As of March 26, 2015; Rankings from AP poll

The 2014–15 Idaho State Bengals women's basketball team represented Idaho State University during the 2014–15 NCAA Division I women's basketball season. The Bengals, led by seventh year head coach Seton Sobolewski, played ten of their home games at Reed Gym. They were members of the Big Sky Conference. They finished the season 13–17, 8–10 in Big Sky play to finish in a tie for eighth place. They failed to qualify for the Big Sky women's tournament.

== Schedule ==
Date time, TV	Rank^{#}	Opponent^{#}	Result	Record	Site (attendance) city, state
Exhibition
11/11/2014*; 2:00 pm		Western New Mexico	W 75–58	–	Reed Gym (N/A); Pocatello, ID
Non-conference regular season
11/16/2014*; 2:00 pm		at Washington State	L 34–84	0–1	Beasley Coliseum (622); Pullman, WA
11/18/2014*; 7:00 pm		at No. 24 Gonzaga	L 63–88	0–2	McCarthey Athletic Center (4,541); Spokane, WA
11/24/2014*; 2:00 pm		Northwest Nazarene	W 88–69	1–2	Reed Gym (612); Pocatello, ID
11/27/2014*; 12:00 pm		vs. San Diego State; San Juan Shootout	L 53–68	1–3	Mario Morales Coliseum (N/A); Guaynabo, PR
11/28/2014*; 3:00 pm		vs. Houston; San Juan Shootout	W 73–67	2–3	Mario Morales Coliseum (N/A); Guaynabo, PR
12/04/2014*; 7:00 pm		Boise State	L 62–86	2–4	Reed Gym (913); Pocatello, ID
12/06/2014*; 2:00 pm		Drake	L 66–80	2–5	Reed Gym (728); Pocatello, ID
12/10/2014*; 7:00 pm		at Utah	L 40–59	2–6	Jon M. Huntsman Center (616); Salt Lake City, UT
12/13/2014*; 2:00 pm		Utah Valley	W 68–67	3–6	Reed Gym (786); Pocatello, ID
12/21/2014*; 2:00 pm		at Seattle	W 63–55	4–6	Connolly Center (371); Seattle, WA
12/29/2014*; 7:00 pm		College of Idaho	W 81–48	5–6	Reed Gym (812); Pocatello, ID
Big Sky Regular Season
01/01/2015; 7:00 pm		Idaho	W 71–50	6–6 (1–0)	Reed Gym (879); Pocatello, ID
01/03/2015; 2:00 pm		Eastern Washington	L 75–88	6–7 (1–1)	Reed Gym (907); Pocatello, ID
01/08/2015; 7:00 pm		at Montana State	W 65–62	7–7 (2–1)	Worthington Arena (1,084); Bozeman, MT
01/10/2015; 2:00 pm		at Montana	L 65–77	7–8 (2–2)	Dahlberg Arena (3,108); Missoula, MT
01/15/2015; 7:00 pm		Southern Utah	L 61–68	7–9 (2–3)	Reed Gym (1,028); Pocatello, ID
01/17/2015; 2:00 pm		Northern Arizona	W 69–68	8–9 (3–3)	Reed Gym (975); Pocatello, ID
01/22/2015; 8:00 pm		at Sacramento State	L 53–84	8–10 (3–4)	Hornets Nest (417); Sacramento, CA
01/24/2015; 8:00 pm		at Portland State	W 65–53	9–10 (4–4)	Stott Center (381); Portland, OR
01/29/2015; 7:00 pm		Northern Colorado	W 70–61	10–10 (5–4)	Reed Gym (984); Pocatello, ID
01/31/2015; 2:00 pm		North Dakota	W 75–69	11–10 (6–4)	Reed Gym (969); Pocatello, ID
02/07/2015; 2:00 pm		at Weber State	L 57–63	11–11 (6–5)	Dee Events Center (806); Ogden, UT
02/12/2015; 6:35 pm		at Northern Arizona	L 47–64	11–12 (6–6)	Walkup Skydome (437); Flagstaff, AZ
02/14/2015; 7:00 pm		at Southern Utah	L 75–76	11–13 (6–7)	Centrum Arena (566); Cedar City, UT
02/19/2015; 7:00 pm		Montana	L 51–69	11–14 (6–8)	Reed Gym (880); Pocatello, ID
02/21/2015; 2:00 pm		Montana State	W 87–74	12–14 (7–8)	Reed Gym (1,125); Pocatello, ID
02/28/2015; 2:00 pm		Weber State	W 63–56	13–14 (8–8)	Reed Gym (1,062); Pocatello, ID
03/05/2015; 7:05 pm		at Eastern Washington	L 58–62	13–15 (8–9)	Reese Court (617); Cheney, WA
03/07/2015; 3:00 pm		at Idaho	L 53–77	13–16 (8–10)	Cowan Spectrum (523); Moscow, ID
Big Sky Women's Tournament
03/11/2015; 8:00 pm	(8)	at (1) Montana; Quarterfinals	L 67–69	13–17	Dahlberg Arena (2,914); Missoula, Montana
*Non-conference game. ^{#}Rankings from AP Poll. (#) Tournament seedings in parentheses. All times are in Mountain Time.

== See also ==
2014–15 Idaho State Bengals men's basketball team
