= 2014–15 Northern Arizona Lumberjacks women's basketball team =

Intercollegiate basketball season

2014–15 Northern Arizona Lumberjacks women's basketball
- Conference: Big Sky Conference
- Record: 13–17 (9–9 Big Sky)
- Head coach: Sue Darling (3rd season)
- Assistant coaches: Jamie Shadian; Robyne Bostick; Karlie Burris
- Home arena: Walkup Skydome; Rolle Activity Center

2014–15 Big Sky women's basketball standings
	Conf.				Overall
Team	W		L	PCT	W		L	PCT
Montana†	14	–	4	.778	24	–	9	.727
Sacramento State	13	–	5	.722	18	–	16	.529
Eastern Washington	12	–	6	.667	21	–	12	.636
Northern Colorado	12	–	6	.667	22	–	13	.629
North Dakota	9	–	9	.500	17	–	15	.531
Montana State	9	–	9	.500	15	–	15	.500
Northern Arizona	9	–	9	.500	13	–	17	.433
Idaho	8	–	10	.444	14	–	15	.483
Idaho State	8	–	10	.444	13	–	17	.433
Southern Utah	6	–	12	.333	13	–	15	.464
Weber State	6	–	12	.333	11	–	18	.379
Portland State	2	–	16	.111	4	–	25	.138
† 2015 Big Sky tournament winner As of March 26, 2015; Rankings from AP poll

The 2014–15 Northern Arizona Lumberjacks women's basketball team represented Northern Arizona University during the 2014–15 NCAA Division I women's basketball season. The Lumberjacks, led by third year head coach Sue Darling and played their home games at the Walkup Skydome and seven games at the Rolle Activity Center. They were members of the Big Sky Conference. They finished the season 13–17, 9–9 in Big Sky play to finish in a three-way tie for fifth place. They lost in the quarterfinals of the Big Sky women's tournament to Eastern Washington.

== Roster ==
2014–15 Northern Arizona Lumberjacks women's basketball team
Players
Coaches

Pos.	#	Name	Height	Year	Previous school	Hometown
G	1	Rene Coggins	5 ft 8 in (1.73 m)	So	Mountain View	Mesa, Arizona
G	4	Brittani Lusain	5 ft 8 in (1.73 m)	So	Mater Dei Catholic	San Diego, California
F	14	Erikka Banks	6 ft 0 in (1.83 m)	Sr	Clovis East	Fresno, California
G	21	Mariah Willadsen	5 ft 8 in (1.73 m)	Jr	Red Mountain; Mesa CC	Mesa, Arizona
F	22	Catelyn Preston	5 ft 10 in (1.78 m)	So	Oregon City	Oregon City, Oregon
F	24	Shay Young	5 ft 11 in (1.8 m)	RS So	Mount Miguel; New Mexico State	San Diego, California
C	25	Raven Anderson	6 ft 2 in (1.88 m)	Sr	Chandler	Tempe, Arizona
F	30	Madi Austin	6 ft 0 in (1.83 m)	Jr	Horizon; Mesa CC	Scottsdale, Arizona
G	34	Taylor Leyva	5 ft 11 in (1.8 m)	So	Pueblo West	Pueblo West, Colorado
G	35	Tori Lloyd	5 ft 7 in (1.7 m)	Fr	Dobson	Mesa, Arizona
G	42	Monique Mulder	5 ft 3 in (1.6 m)	Jr	Deer Valley; New Mexico JC	Antioch, California
G	50	Bradlee Cotton	6 ft 0 in (1.83 m)	So	Denver School S&T	Denver, Colorado

Head coach

- Sue Darling

Assistant coach(es)

- Jamie Shadian
- Robyne Bostick
- Karlie Burris

Legend

- (C) Team captain
- (S) Suspended
- (I) Ineligible
- (W) Walk-on
- Injured
- Current redshirt

Roster

== Schedule ==
Date time, TV	Rank^{#}	Opponent^{#}	Result	Record	Site (attendance) city, state
Exhibition
11/03/2014*; 5:00 pm		New Mexico Highlands	W 84–53	–	Rolle Activity Center (194); Flagstaff, Arizona
Regular Season
11/14/2014*; 5:30 pm, NAU-TV		UC Irvine	W 66–35	1–0	Rolle Activity Center (344); Flagstaff, Arizona
11/16/2014*; 2:00 pm		Western New Mexico	L 54–58	1–1	Rolle Activity Center (347); Flagstaff, Arizona
11/19/2014*; 7:00 pm		at UTEP	L 58–82	1–2	Don Haskins Center (682); El Paso, Texas
11/23/2014*; 2:00 pm		UC Santa Barbara	W 67–49	2–2	Rolle Activity Center (232); Flagstaff, Arizona
11/26/2014*; 6:00 pm		at Texas–Arlington	L 62–80	2–3	College Park Center (951); Arlington, Texas
11/29/2014*; 2:00 pm		Fort Lewis	W 61–43	3–3	Rolle Activity Center (161); Flagstaff, Arizona
12/03/2014*; 5:00 pm, FSAZ/FCSP		Loyola Marymount	W 82–64	4–3	Walkup Skydome (406); Flagstaff, Arizona
12/13/2014*; 3:00 pm		at Oregon	L 47–59	4–4	Matthew Knight Arena (1,286); Eugene, Oregon
12/16/2014*; 12:00 pm		Pepperdine	L 63–66	4–5	Walkup Skydome (803); Flagstaff, Arizona
12/18/2014*; 6:30 pm		Cal State Northridge	L 71–77	4–6	Walkup Skydome (254); Flagstaff, Arizona
12/21/2014*; 1:00 pm		at New Mexico	L 37–56	4–7	The Pit (5,144); Albuquerque, New Mexico
01/01/2015; 2:00 pm		Sacramento State	W 64–60	5–7 (1–0)	Walkup Skydome (204); Flagstaff, Arizona
01/03/2015; 2:00 pm		Portland State	W 94–46	6–7 (2–0)	Walkup Skydome (169); Flagstaff, Arizona
01/10/2015; 7:00 pm		at Southern Utah	L 53–63	6–8 (2–1)	Centrum Arena (463); Cedar City, Utah
01/15/2015; 7:00 pm		at Weber State	L 53–66	6–9 (2–2)	Dee Events Center (712); Ogden, Utah
01/17/2015; 2:00 pm		at Idaho State	L 68–69	6–10 (2–3)	Reed Gym (975); Pocatello, Idaho
01/22/2015; 7:00 pm, FSAZ+/FCSA		Montana	L 42–69	6–11 (2–4)	Walkup Skydome (408); Flagstaff, Arizona
01/24/2015; 6:30 pm, FSAZ/FCSC		Montana State	W 79–64	7–11 (3–4)	Walkup Skydome (495); Flagstaff, Arizona
01/31/2015; 5:30 pm, FSAZ/FCSA		Southern Utah	W 73–64 ^{OT}	8–11 (4–4)	Walkup Skydome (557); Flagstaff, Arizona
02/05/2015; 7:00 pm		at Northern Colorado	W 51–49	9–11 (5–4)	Bank of Colorado Arena (545); Greeley, Colorado
02/07/2015; 1:00 pm		at North Dakota	L 62–78	9–12 (5–5)	Betty Engelstad Sioux Center (1,975); Grand Forks, North Dakota
02/12/2015; 6:30 pm, FSAZ/FCSC		Idaho State	W 64–47	10–12 (6–5)	Walkup Skydome (437); Flagstaff, Arizona
02/14/2015; 2:00 pm, FSAZ+/FCSP		Weber State	W 56–52	11–12 (7–5)	Rolle Activity Center (448); Flagstaff, Arizona
02/19/2015; 7:00 pm		at Idaho	L 43–78	11–13 (7–6)	Cowan Spectrum (489); Moscow, Idaho
02/21/2015; 3:00 pm		at Eastern Washington	L 42–73	11–14 (7–7)	Reese Court (415); Cheney, Washington
02/26/2015; 6:30 pm, FSAZ/FCSA		North Dakota	W 72–68 ^{2OT}	12–14 (8–7)	Rolle Activity Center (403); Flagstaff, Arizona
02/28/2015; 8:00 pm, FSAZ+/FCSP		Northern Colorado	L 67–88	12–15 (8–8)	Walkup Skydome (455); Flagstaff, Arizona
03/05/2015; 8:00 pm		at Portland State	W 79–62	13–15 (9–8)	Stott Center (355); Portland, Oregon
03/07/2015; 3:00 pm		at Sacramento State	L 81–105	13–16 (9–9)	Colberg Court (506); Sacramento, California
Big Sky Women's Tournament
03/11/2015; 4:30 pm		vs. Eastern Washington; Quarterfinals	L 57–73	13–17	Dahlberg Arena (638); Missoula, Montana
*Non-conference game. ^{#}Rankings from AP Poll. (#) Tournament seedings in parentheses. All times are in Mountain Time.

== See also ==
2014–15 Northern Arizona Lumberjacks men's basketball team
