= 2014–15 Montana State Bobcats women's basketball team =

Intercollegiate basketball season

2014–15 Montana State Bobcats women's basketball
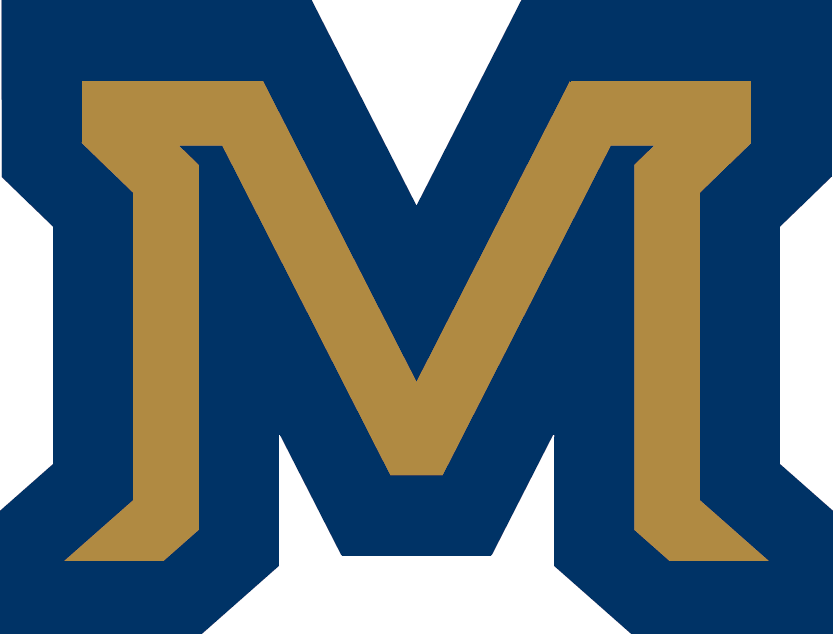
- Conference: Big Sky Conference
- Record: 15–15 (9–9 Big Sky)
- Head coach: Tricia Binford (9th season)
- Assistant coaches: Amy Starr; Kellee Barney; Nate Harris
- Home arena: Worthington Arena

2014–15 Big Sky women's basketball standings
	Conf.				Overall
Team	W		L	PCT	W		L	PCT
Montana†	14	–	4	.778	24	–	9	.727
Sacramento State	13	–	5	.722	18	–	16	.529
Eastern Washington	12	–	6	.667	21	–	12	.636
Northern Colorado	12	–	6	.667	22	–	13	.629
North Dakota	9	–	9	.500	17	–	15	.531
Montana State	9	–	9	.500	15	–	15	.500
Northern Arizona	9	–	9	.500	13	–	17	.433
Idaho	8	–	10	.444	14	–	15	.483
Idaho State	8	–	10	.444	13	–	17	.433
Southern Utah	6	–	12	.333	13	–	15	.464
Weber State	6	–	12	.333	11	–	18	.379
Portland State	2	–	16	.111	4	–	25	.138
† 2015 Big Sky tournament winner As of March 26, 2015; Rankings from AP poll

The 2014–15 Montana State Bobcats women's basketball team represented Montana State University during the 2014–15 NCAA Division I women's basketball season. The Bobcats, led by ninth year head coach Tricia Binford, played their home games at Worthington Arena and were members of the Big Sky Conference. They finished the season 15–15, 9–9 in Big Sky play to finish in a three-way tie for fifth place. They lost in the quarterfinals of the Big Sky women's tournament to Sacramento State.

== Roster ==
2014–15 Montana State Bobcats women's basketball team
Players
Coaches

Pos.	#	Name	Height	Year	Previous school	Hometown
G	0	Ausha Cole	5 ft 8 in (1.73 m)	Sr	Gilbert HS	Mesa, Arizona
G	2	Peyton Ferris	5 ft 9 in (1.75 m)	RS So	Twin Bridges HS	Twin Bridges, Montana
G	3	Kalli Durham	5 ft 7 in (1.7 m)	Sr	Custer County HS	Miles City, Montana
G	10	Margreet Barhoum	5 ft 6 in (1.68 m)	RS So	Meadowdale HS	Edmonds, WA
G	11	Lindsay Stockton	5 ft 6 in (1.68 m)	Jr	Gonzaga Prep	Spokane, Washington
G	12	Delany Junkermier	6 ft 0 in (1.83 m)	Fr	Mead HS	Spokane, Washington
F	13	Ashton Siegner	6 ft 1 in (1.85 m)	Fr	West Albany HS	Albany, Oregon
G	14	Michelle Seitz	5 ft 6 in (1.68 m)	Jr	Nezperce HS; Walla Walla CC	Nezperce, Idaho
F	15	Jackie Elliott	6 ft 0 in (1.83 m)	Sr	Billings Central HS	Billings, Montana
F	22	Alexa Dawkins	6 ft 1 in (1.85 m)	Jr	Bozeman HS	Bozeman, Montana
G	23	Hannah Caudill	5 ft 7 in (1.7 m)	Fr	Gonzaga Prep	Spokane, Washington
F	24	Riley Nordgaard	5 ft 10 in (1.78 m)	Jr	Canby HS; Augustana College	Canby, Minnesota
F	33	Amy Davis	6 ft 1 in (1.85 m)	Fr	Bozeman HS	Bozeman, Montana
F	34	Jasmine Hommes	6 ft 1 in (1.85 m)	Jr	Lynden Christian	Lynden, Washington
C	44	Haley Blodgett	6 ft 3 in (1.91 m)	Fr	Golden HS	Golden, Colorado

Head coach

- Tricia Binford

Assistant coach(es)

- Amy Starr
- Kellee Barney
- Nate Harris

Legend

- (C) Team captain
- (S) Suspended
- (I) Ineligible
- (W) Walk-on
- Injured
- Current redshirt

Roster

== Schedule ==
Date time, TV	Rank^{#}	Opponent^{#}	Result	Record	Site (attendance) city, state
Regular Season
11/14/2014*; 7:00 pm		at Boise State	L 60–75	0–1	Taco Bell Arena (865); Boise, Idaho
11/16/2014*; 2:00 pm		at Cal State Fullerton	W 63–47	1–1	Titan Gym (N/A); Fullerton, California
11/21/2014*; 7:00 pm		No. 24 Gonzaga	L 60–89	1–2	Worthington Arena (1,517); Bozeman, Montana
11/23/2014*; 2:00 pm		Seattle	W 74–61	2–2	Worthington Arena (1,067); Bozeman, Montana
11/25/2014*; 7:00 pm		at San Diego	L 64–79	2–3	Jenny Craig Pavilion (426); San Diego, California
11/28/2014*; 6:00 pm		at Cal State Northridge; Matador Classic semifinals	L 66–78	2–4	Matadome (308); Northridge, California
11/29/2014*; 1:00 pm		vs. IUPUI; Matador Classic 3rd place game	W 80–74	3–4	Matadome (N/A); Northridge, California
12/04/2014*; 7:00 pm		Great Falls	W 87–71	4–4	Worthington Arena (865); Bozeman, Montana
12/06/2014*; 5:00 pm		Wyoming	W 79–52	5–4	Worthington Arena (848); Bozeman, Montana
12/15/2014*; 7:00 pm		Montana State Billings	W 76–57	6–4	Worthington Arena (788); Bozeman, Montana
12/20/2014*; 2:00 pm		at Washington State	L 61–82	6–5	Beasley Coliseum (942); Pullman, Washington
01/01/2015; 6:00 pm		at North Dakota	L 74–82	6–6 (0–1)	Betty Engelstad Sioux Center (1,509); Grand Forks, North Dakota
01/03/2015; 2:00 pm		at Northern Colorado	L 61–80	6–7 (0–2)	Bank of Colorado Arena (315); Greeley, Colorado
01/08/2015; 7:00 pm		Idaho State	L 62–65	6–8 (0–3)	Worthington Arena (1,084); Bozeman, Montana
01/10/2015; 2:00 pm		Weber State	W 62–54	7–8 (1–3)	Worthington Arena (817); Bozeman, Montana
01/17/2015; 2:00 pm		at Montana	L 48–62	7–9 (1–4)	Dahlberg Arena (3,535); Missoula, Montana
01/22/2015; 7:00 pm		at Southern Utah	L 69–74	7–10 (1–5)	Centrum Arena (674); Cedar City, Utah
01/24/2015; 6:30 pm		at Northern Arizona	L 64–79	7–11 (1–6)	Walkup Skydome (495); Flagstaff, Arizona
01/29/2015; 7:00 pm		Sacramento State	W 91–64	8–11 (2–6)	Worthington Arena (885); Bozeman, Montana
01/31/2015; 2:00 pm		Portland State	W 63–46	9–11 (3–6)	Worthington Arena (936); Bozeman, Montana
02/05/2015; 8:00 pm		at Idaho	W 76–65	10–11 (4–6)	Cowan Spectrum (579); Moscow, Idaho
02/07/2015; 3:00 pm		at Eastern Washington	L 58–72	10–12 (4–7)	Reese Court (527); Cheney, Washington
02/12/2015; 7:00 pm		Northern Colorado	L 63–84	10–13 (4–8)	Worthington Arena (897); Bozeman, Montana
02/14/2015; 2:00 pm		North Dakota	W 80–62	11–13 (5–8)	Worthington Arena (960); Bozeman, Montana
02/19/2015; 7:00 pm		at Weber State	W 60–49	12–13 (6–8)	Dee Events Center (826); Ogden, Utah
02/21/2015; 2:00 pm		at Idaho State	L 74–87 ^{OT}	12–14 (6–9)	Reed Gym (1,125); Pocatello, Idaho
02/26/2015; 7:00 pm		Eastern Washington	W 63–53	13–14 (7–9)	Worthington Arena (950); Bozeman, Montana
02/28/2015; 2:00 pm		Idaho	W 71–62	14–14 (8–9)	Worthington Arena (784); Bozeman, Montana
03/07/2015; 2:00 pm		Montana	W 65–57	15–14 (9–9)	Worthington Arena (2,506); Bozeman, Montana
Big Sky Women's Tournament
03/11/2015; 11:00 am		vs. Sacramento State; Quarterfinals	L 62–78	15–15	Dahlburg Arena (308); Missoula, Montana
*Non-conference game. ^{#}Rankings from AP Poll. (#) Tournament seedings in parentheses. All times are in Mountain Time.

== See also ==
2014–15 Montana State Bobcats men's basketball team
