= 2014–15 Utah State Aggies women's basketball team =

Intercollegiate basketball season

2014–15 Utah State Aggies women's basketball
- Conference: Mountain West Conference
- Record: 8–23 (5–13 Mountain West)
- Head coach: Jerry Finkbeiner (3rd season)
- Assistant coaches: Ben Finkbeiner (1st season); JC Carter (1st season); Micha Thompson (3rd season)
- Home arena: Smith Spectrum

2014–15 Mountain West Conference women's basketball standings
	Conf.				Overall
Team	W		L	PCT	W		L	PCT
Colorado State	15	–	3	.833	23	–	8	.742
New Mexico	14	–	4	.778	21	–	13	.618
Fresno State	13	–	5	.722	23	–	10	.697
Boise State †	11	–	7	.611	21	–	11	.656
Wyoming	10	–	8	.556	16	–	14	.533
UNLV	10	–	8	.556	13	–	17	.433
San Diego State	8	–	10	.444	12	–	19	.387
San Jose State	7	–	11	.389	15	–	17	.469
Nevada	5	–	13	.278	9	–	21	.300
Utah State	5	–	13	.278	8	–	23	.258
Air Force	1	–	17	.056	2	–	28	.067
† 2015 MWC tournament winner Rankings from AP poll

The 2014–15 Utah State Aggies women's basketball team represented Utah State University in the 2014–15 college basketball season. The Aggies, led by third year head coach Jerry Finkbeiner. The Aggies played their home games at the Smith Spectrum and were second year members of the Mountain West Conference. They finished the season 8–23, 5–13 in Mountain West play in a tie to finish in tenth place. They lost in the first round of the Mountain West women's tournament to San Jose State.

== Roster ==
2014–15 Utah State Aggies women's basketball team
Players
Coaches

Pos.	#	Name	Height	Year	Previous school	Hometown
G	2	Elise Nelson	5 ft 9 in (1.75 m)	Sr	Thurston HS	Springfield, OR
G/F	3	Funda Nakkaşoğlu	5 ft 7 in (1.7 m)	Fr	St. Leonard's	Hampton, Australia
G/F	4	Tilar Clark	5 ft 11 in (1.8 m)	Fr	Skyline HS	Idaho Falls, ID
G/F	10	Julianne Anchling	6 ft 3 in (1.91 m)	Jr	Notre Dame des Victoires; Trinity Valley CC	Faverges de la Tour, France
G/F	12	Milanna Barnes	6 ft 0 in (1.83 m)	Fr	Mountain Crest HS	Hyrum, UT
G/F	14	Signe Kyrkjebo	6 ft 0 in (1.83 m)	Fr	Nordhal Grieg HS	Bergen, Norway
G	20	Mariah Miles	5 ft 7 in (1.7 m)	Jr	Calumet HS; Oral Roberts	Geary, OK
F	22	Tijana Djukic	6 ft 4 in (1.93 m)	Jr	Gymnasium J.J. Zmaj; Miami Dade College	Kikinda, Serbia
F	23	Baylee Peck	5 ft 7 in (1.7 m)	Fr	Rouse HS	Leander, TX
G/F	24	Jasmine Porter	6 ft 3 in (1.91 m)	RS Sr	Layton Christian Academy; San Diego State	Layton, UT
G	25	Lynette Johnson	5 ft 9 in (1.75 m)	So	John F. Kennedy HS	Sacramento, CA
C	40	Hannah Hutchins	6 ft 4 in (1.93 m)	Fr	Ledyard HS	Ledyead, CT
F	44	Franny Vaaulu	6 ft 2 in (1.88 m)	Sr	Warren HS	Los Angeles, CA
F	50	Ingrida Strikas	6 ft 1 in (1.85 m)	Sr	Riga Secondary School No. 47; Vincennes	Riga, Latvia

Head coach

- Jerry Finkbeiner (Southern Nazarene)

Assistant coach(es)

- Ben Finkbeiner (Oral Roberts)
- JC Carter (Southwest Baptist)
- Micha Thompson (Pensacola Christian)

Legend

- (C) Team captain
- (S) Suspended
- (I) Ineligible
- (W) Walk-on
- Injured
- Current redshirt

Roster

== Schedule ==
Date time, TV	Rank^{#}	Opponent^{#}	Result	Record	Site (attendance) city, state
Exhibition
11/03/2014*; 7:00 pm		Western New Mexico	W 87–66	–	Smith Spectrum (438); Logan, UT
Non-conference regular season
11/14/2014*; 1:00 pm		at Oregon	L 77–100	0–1	Matthew Knight Arena (1,569); Eugene, OR
11/16/2014*; 3:00 pm		at No. 20 Oregon State	L 62–85	0–2	Gill Coliseum (1,762); Corvallis, OR
11/20/2014*; 7:00 pm		Utah Valley	W 79–61	1–2	Smith Spectrum (500); Logan, UT
11/28/2014*; 6:00 pm		at No. 13 Baylor; BTI Classic	L 43–99	1–3	Ferrell Center (5,754); Waco, TX
11/29/2014*; 1:00 pm		vs. Marist; BTI Classic	L 65–68	1–4	Ferrell Center (5,458); Waco, TX
11/30/2014*; 11:00 am		vs. Stetson; BTI Classic	L 64–84	1–5	Ferrell Center (N/A); Waco, TX
12/03/2014*; 6:00 pm		at Utah	L 57–62	1–6	Jon M. Huntsman Center (678); Salt Lake City, UT
12/06/2014*; 2:00 pm		Westminster	W 60–51	2–6	Smith Spectrum (374); Logan, UT
12/14/2014*; 7:00 pm		Northern Colorado	W 65–61	3–6	Smith Spectrum (341); Logan, UT
12/16/2014*; 8:00 pm		at Pacific	L 62–70	3–7	Alex G. Spanos Center (325); Stockton, CA
12/19/2014*; 8:00 pm		at Sacramento State	L 92–102	3–8	Colberg Court (258); Sacramento, CA
12/22/2014*; 7:00 pm		BYU	L 58–62 ^{2OT}	3–9	Smith Spectrum (258); Logan, UT
Mountain West Regular Season
12/31/2014; 8:00 pm		at San Jose State	L 58–62	3–10 (0–1)	Event Center Arena (288); San Jose, CA
01/03/2015; 2:00 pm		Boise State	L 53–63	3–11 (0–2)	Smith Spectrum (404); Logan, UT
01/07/2015; 7:00 pm		Fresno State	L 64–70	3–12 (0–3)	Smith Spectrum (561); Logan, UT
01/10/2015; 2:00 pm		at New Mexico	L 59–60	3–13 (0–4)	The Pit (5,521); Albuquerque, NM
01/17/2015; 2:00 pm		at Air Force	W 69–53	4–13 (1–4)	Clune Arena (305); Colorado Springs, CO
01/21/2015; 7:00 pm		Nevada	W 68–57	5–13 (2–4)	Smith Spectrum (510); Logan, UT
01/24/2015; 2:00 pm		UNLV	W 85–72	6–13 (3–4)	Smith Spectrum (457); Logan, UT
01/28/2015; 7:00 pm		at Wyoming	L 51–86	6–14 (3–5)	Arena-Auditorium (2,861); Laramie, WY
01/31/2015; 2:00 pm		San Diego State	L 59–70	6–15 (3–6)	Smith Spectrum (471); Logan, UT
02/04/2015; 7:00 pm		at Boise State	L 55–94	6–16 (3–7)	Smith Spectrum (404); Logan, UT
02/07/2015; 2:00 pm		New Mexico	L 51–56	6–17 (3–8)	Smith Spectrum (457); Logan, UT
02/11/2015; 7:00 pm		at Nevada	L 44–49	6–18 (3–9)	Lawlor Events Center (853); Reno, NV
02/18/2015; 8:00 pm		San Jose State	W 85–80	7–18 (4–9)	Smith Spectrum (382); Logan, UT
02/21/2015; 3:00 pm		at Fresno State	L 55–64	7–19 (4–10)	Save Mart Center (2,814); Fresno, CA
02/25/2015; 8:00 pm		at UNLV	L 61–69	7–20 (4–11)	Cox Pavilion (787); Paradise, NV
02/28/2015; 2:00 pm		Air Force	W 84–50	8–20 (5–11)	Smith Spectrum (616); Logan, UT
03/03/2015; 7:00 pm		Wyoming	L 57–61	8–21 (5–12)	Smith Spectrum (571); Logan, UT
03/06/2015; 2:00 pm		Colorado State	L 58–76	8–22 (5–13)	Smith Spectrum (1,825); Logan, UT
Mountain West Women's Tournament
03/09/2015; 3:00 pm, MWN		vs. San Jose State; First Round	L 85–99	8–23	Thomas & Mack Center; Paradise, NV
*Non-conference game. ^{#}Rankings from AP Poll. (#) Tournament seedings in parentheses. All times are in Mountain Time. All dates, times and TV are tentative and subject to change.

== See also ==
- 2014–15 Utah State Aggies men's basketball team
