= 2014–15 Colorado State Rams women's basketball team =

Intercollegiate basketball season

2014–15 Colorado State Rams women's basketball
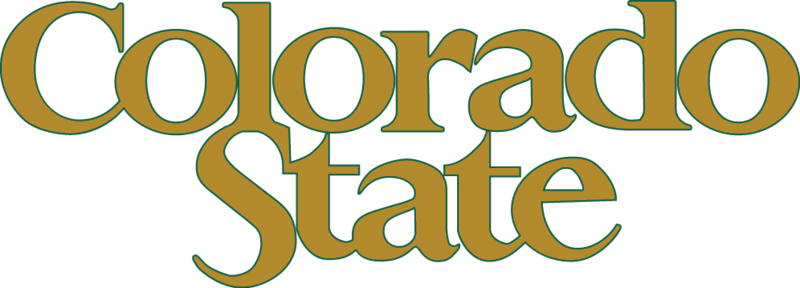

Mountain West Regular Season Champions

WNIT, First Round
- Conference: Mountain West Conference
- Record: 23–8 (15–3 Mountain West)
- Head coach: Ryun Williams (3rd season)
- Assistant coaches: Tim Moser (3rd season); Brooke Atkinson (1st season); Rebecca Alvidrez (1st season)
- Home arena: Moby Arena

2014–15 Mountain West Conference women's basketball standings
	Conf.				Overall
Team	W		L	PCT	W		L	PCT
Colorado State	15	–	3	.833	23	–	8	.742
New Mexico	14	–	4	.778	21	–	13	.618
Fresno State	13	–	5	.722	23	–	10	.697
Boise State †	11	–	7	.611	21	–	11	.656
Wyoming	10	–	8	.556	16	–	14	.533
UNLV	10	–	8	.556	13	–	17	.433
San Diego State	8	–	10	.444	12	–	19	.387
San Jose State	7	–	11	.389	15	–	17	.469
Nevada	5	–	13	.278	9	–	21	.300
Utah State	5	–	13	.278	8	–	23	.258
Air Force	1	–	17	.056	2	–	28	.067
† 2015 MWC tournament winner Rankings from AP poll

The 2014–15 Colorado State Rams women's basketball team represented Colorado State University in the 2014–15 college basketball season. The Rams, led by third-year head coach Ryun Williams. They Rams played their home games at the Moby Arena and were members of the Mountain West Conference. They finished the season 23–8, 15–3 in Mountain West play to win the regular season championship. The Rams lost in the quarterfinals of the Mountain West Conference women's basketball tournament to San Jose State. As regular season champions who failed to win their conference tournament, they received an automatic bid to the Women's National Invitation Tournament, where they lost in the first round to Northern Colorado.

== Roster ==
2014–15 Colorado State Rams women's basketball team
Players	Coaches
Pos. / # / Name / Height / Year / Previous school / Hometown	Head coach: Ryun Williams; Assistant coach(es): Tim Moser; Brooke Atkinson; Rebecca Alvidrez; Legend: (C) Team captain; (S) Suspended; (I) Ineligible; (W) Walk-on; Injured; Current redshirt; Roster

== Schedule ==
Date time, TV	Rank^{#}	Opponent^{#}	Result	Record	Site (attendance) city, state
Exhibition
10/30/2014*; 7:00 pm		Metro State	W 90–62	–	Moby Arena (1,271); Fort Collins, CO
Non-conference regular season
11/14/2014*; 7:00 pm		Hawai'i	L 58–63 ^{OT}	0–1	Moby Arena (1,179); Fort Collins, CO
11/18/2014*; 7:00 pm		Colorado School of Mines	W 99–45	1–1	Moby Arena (914); Fort Collins, CO
11/23/2014*; 12:00 pm		Illinois State	W 70–49	2–1	Moby Arena (1,102); Fort Collins, CO
11/28/2014*; 5:00 pm		vs. TCU; Omni Classic semifinals	W 76–62	3–1	Coors Events Center (2,190); Boulder, CO
11/29/2014*; 7:30 pm		at Colorado; Omni Classic championship	L 81–87 ^{2OT}	3–2	Coors Events Center (2,284); Boulder, CO
12/03/2014*; 6:00 pm		at Drake	W 69–56	4–2	Knapp Center (1,779); Des Moines, IA
12/06/2014*; 2:00 pm, BYUtv		vs. BYU	L 58–69	4–3	EnergySolutions Arena (450); Salt Lake City, UT
12/09/2014*; 7:00 pm		South Dakota School of Mines	W 75–39	5–3	Moby Arena (1,140); Fort Collins, CO
12/11/2014*; 7:00 pm		Denver	W 81–61	6–3	Moby Arena (1,107); Fort Collins, CO
12/14/2014*; 12:00 pm		Florida Atlantic	W 59–46	7–3	Moby Arena (923); Fort Collins, CO
12/21/2014*; 2:00 pm		Cal Poly	W 65–63	8–3	Moby Arena (989); Fort Collins, CO
Mountain West regular season
12/31/2014; 11:30 am		at Boise State	L 65–75	8–4 (0–1)	Taco Bell Arena (549); Boise, ID
01/03/2015; 2:00 pm		New Mexico	W 44–38	9–4 (1–1)	Moby Arena (1,178); Fort Collins, CO
01/07/2015; 7:00 pm		at Wyoming; Border War	W 58–55	10–4 (2–1)	Arena-Auditorium (2,955); Laramie, WY
01/10/2015; 3:00 pm		Air Force	W 62–42	11–4 (3–1)	Moby Arena (1,153); Fort Collins, CO
01/14/2015; 7:30 pm		at Nevada	W 59–58	12–4 (4–1)	Lawlor Events Center (1,022); Reno, NV
01/17/2015; 12:00 pm		San Jose State	W 77–59	13–4 (5–1)	Moby Arena (1,246); Fort Collins, CO
01/24/2015; 3:00 pm		at San Diego State	W 49–36	14–4 (6–1)	Viejas Arena (643); San Diego, CA
01/28/2015; 7:00 pm		Boise State	W 83–82	15–4 (7–1)	Moby Arena (1,191); Fort Collins, CO
01/31/2015; 3:00 pm		at Fresno State	L 49–53	15–5 (7–2)	Save Mart Center (N/A); Fresno, CA
02/04/2015; 6:00 pm		Wyoming; Border War	W 67–58	16–5 (8–2)	Moby Arena (1,786); Fort Collins, CO
02/07/2015; 5:00 pm		at UNLV	W 55–43	17–5 (9–2)	Cox Pavilion (1,176); Paradise, NV
02/11/2015; 7:00 pm		at New Mexico	L 40–67	17–6 (9–3)	The Pit (5,388); Albuquerque, NM
02/14/2015; 3:00 pm		San Diego State	W 65–42	18–6 (10–3)	Moby Arena (2,420); Fort Collins, CO
02/18/2015; 6:00 pm		Fresno State	W 70–56	19–6 (11–3)	Moby Arena (1,247); Fort Collins, CO
02/21/2015; 2:00 pm		at Air Force	W 85–49	20–6 (12–3)	Clune Arena (311); Colorado Springs, CO
02/25/2015; 8:00 pm		at San Jose State	W 85–76	21–6 (13–3)	Event Center Arena (361); San Jose, CA
03/03/2015; 7:00 pm		Nevada	W 68–61	22–6 (14–3)	Moby Arena (1,155); Fort Collins, CO
03/06/2015; 7:00 pm		Utah State	W 76–58	23–6 (15–3)	Moby Arena (1,825); Fort Collins, CO
Mountain West Women's Tournament
03/10/2015; 1:00 pm	(1)	vs. (8) San Jose State; Quarterfinals	L 55–64	23–7	Thomas & Mack Center (1,457); Paradise, NV
2015 WNIT
03/19/2015*; 7:00 pm		Northern Colorado; First Round	L 48–53	23–8	Moby Arena (1,367); Fort Collins, CO
*Non-conference game. ^{#}Rankings from AP Poll. (#) Tournament seedings in parentheses. All times are in Mountain Time.

== See also ==
- 2014–15 Colorado State Rams men's basketball team
