= 2014–15 San Diego State Aztecs women's basketball team =

Intercollegiate basketball season

2014–15 San Diego State Aztecs women's basketball
- Conference: Mountain West Conference
- Record: 12–19 (8–10 Mountain West)
- Head coach: Stacie Terry (2nd season)
- Assistant coaches: Jesse Clark; Ciara Carl; Nick Grant
- Home arena: Viejas Arena

2014–15 Mountain West Conference women's basketball standings
	Conf.				Overall
Team	W		L	PCT	W		L	PCT
Colorado State	15	–	3	.833	23	–	8	.742
New Mexico	14	–	4	.778	21	–	13	.618
Fresno State	13	–	5	.722	23	–	10	.697
Boise State †	11	–	7	.611	21	–	11	.656
Wyoming	10	–	8	.556	16	–	14	.533
UNLV	10	–	8	.556	13	–	17	.433
San Diego State	8	–	10	.444	12	–	19	.387
San Jose State	7	–	11	.389	15	–	17	.469
Nevada	5	–	13	.278	9	–	21	.300
Utah State	5	–	13	.278	8	–	23	.258
Air Force	1	–	17	.056	2	–	28	.067
† 2015 MWC tournament winner Rankings from AP poll

The 2014–15 San Diego State Aztecs women's basketball team represented San Diego State University in the 2014–15 college basketball season. The Aztecs, led by second year head coach Stacie Terry, played their home games at Viejas Arena and were members of the Mountain West Conference. They finished the season 12–19, 8–10 in Mountain West play to finish in seventh place. They advance to the quarterfinals of the 2015 Mountain West Conference women's basketball tournament, where they lost to New Mexico in the quarterfinals.

== Roster ==
2014–15 San Diego State Aztecs women's basketball team
Players	Coaches
Pos. / # / Name / Height / Year / Previous school / Hometown	Head coach: Stacie Terry; Assistant coach(es): Jesse Clark; Ciara Carl; Nick Grant; Legend: (C) Team captain; (S) Suspended; (I) Ineligible; (W) Walk-on; Injured; Current redshirt; Roster

== Schedule ==
Date time, TV	Rank^{#}	Opponent^{#}	Result	Record	Site (attendance) city, state
Exhibition
11/08/2014*; 12:00 pm		Point Loma Nazarene	W 55–52	–	Viejas Arena (3,873); San Diego, CA
Non-conference regular season
11/14/2014*; 2:00 pm		Sacramento State	W 99–91	1–0	Viejas Arena (391); San Diego, CA
11/16/2014*; 2:00 pm		Long Beach State	L 62–74	1–1	Viejas Arena (545); San Diego, CA
11/21/2014*; 7:00 pm		at Furman	L 43–60	1–2	Timmons Arena (577); Greenville, SC
11/23/2014*; 2:00 pm		at No. 2 South Carolina	L 38–89	1–3	Colonial Life Arena (10,301); Columbia, SC
11/27/2014*; 3:00 pm		vs. Idaho State; San Juan Shootout	W 68–53	2–3	Mario Morales Coliseum (N/A); Guaynabo, PR
11/29/2014*; 1:00 pm		vs. Michigan; San Juan Shootout	L 50–70	2–4	Mario Morales Coliseum (N/A); Guaynabo, PR
12/07/2014*; 2:00 pm		UC Santa Barbara	W 64–58	3–4	Viejas Arena (421); San Diego, CA
12/09/2014*; 6:00 pm		at San Diego	L 44–66	3–5	Jenny Craig Pavilion (963); San Diego, CA
12/18/2014*; 6:00 pm		Washington	L 48–69	3–6	Viejas Arena (925); San Diego, CA
12/20/2014*; 2:00 pm		Cal State Northridge	L 54–65	3–7	Viejas Arena (537); San Diego, CA
12/23/2014*; 2:00 pm		at UC Riverside	L 54–64	3–8	SRC Arena (179); Riverside, CA
Mountain West Regular Season
12/31/2014; 12:00 pm		at Air Force	W 74–65	4–8 (1–0)	Clune Arena (313); Colorado Springs, CO
01/03/2015; 2:00 pm		Fresno State	L 44–56	4–9 (1–1)	Viejas Arena (517); San Diego, CA
01/07/2015; 7:00 pm		at New Mexico	L 53–62	4–10 (1–2)	The Pit (4,929); Albuquerque, NM
01/14/2015; 6:00 pm		Wyoming	W 57–54	5–10 (2–2)	Viejas Arena (341); San Diego, CA
01/17/2015; 2:00 pm		at UNLV	L 47–64	5–11 (2–3)	Cox Pavilion (1,006); Paradise, NV
01/21/2015; 6:00 pm		Air Force	W 70–47	6–11 (3–3)	Viejas Arena (362); San Diego, CA
01/24/2015; 2:00 pm		Colorado State	L 36–49	6–12 (3–4)	Viejas Arena (643); San Diego, CA
01/28/2015; 7:00 pm		at Fresno State	L 50–57	6–13 (3–5)	Save Mart Center (2,361); Fresno, CA
01/31/2015; 2:00 pm		at Utah State	W 70–59	7–13 (4–5)	Smith Spectrum (471); Logan, UT
02/04/2015; 6:00 pm		Nevada	W 57–49	8–13 (5–5)	Viejas Arena (603); San Diego, CA
02/07/2015; 2:00 pm		Boise State	W 57–40	9–13 (6–5)	Viejas Arena (1,538); San Diego, CA
02/11/2015; 7:00 pm		at Wyoming	L 66–74	9–14 (6–6)	Arena-Auditorium (2,898); Laramie, WY
02/14/2015; 2:00 pm		at Colorado State	L 42–65	9–15 (6–7)	Moby Arena (2,420); Fort Collins, CO
02/18/2015; 6:00 pm		New Mexico	L 47–63	9–16 (6–8)	Viejas Arena (411); San Diego, CA
02/21/2015; 2:00 pm		San Jose State	W 71–61	10–16 (7–8)	Viejas Arena (711); San Diego, CA
02/28/2015; 2:00 pm		at Boise State	L 58–64	10–17 (7–9)	Taco Bell Arena (851); Boise, ID
03/03/2015; 6:00 pm		UNLV	W 76–61	11–17 (8–9)	Viejas Arena (517); San Diego, CA
03/06/2015; 6:30 pm		at Nevada	L 44–50	11–18 (8–10)	Lawlor Events Center (1,298); Reno, NV
Mountain West Women's Tournament
03/09/2015; 4:30 pm, MWN	(7)	vs. (10) Nevada; First round	W 70–48	12–18	Thomas & Mack Center (1,838); Paradise, NV
03/10/2015; 6:00 pm, MWN	(7)	vs. (2) New Mexico; Quarterfinals	L 56–57	12–19	Thomas & Mack Center (3,015); Paradise, NV
*Non-conference game. ^{#}Rankings from AP Poll. (#) Tournament seedings in parentheses. All times are in Pacific Time.

== See also ==
- 2014–15 San Diego State Aztecs men's basketball team
