= 2014–15 Northern Colorado Bears women's basketball team =

Intercollegiate basketball season

2014–15 Northern Colorado Bears women's basketball
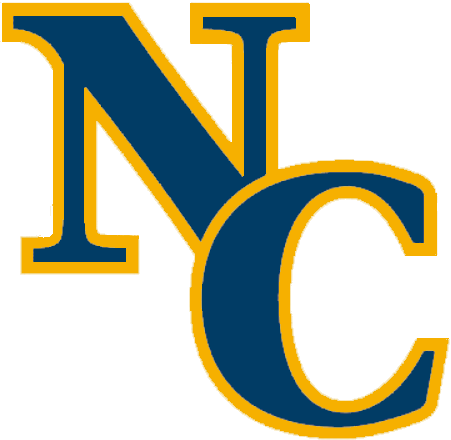

WNIT, Third Round
- Conference: Big Sky Conference
- Record: 22–13 (12–6 Big Sky)
- Head coach: Kamie Ethridge (1st season)
- Assistant coaches: Shalee Lehning; Kelly Moylan; Deb Patterson
- Home arena: Bank of Colorado Arena

2014–15 Big Sky women's basketball standings
	Conf.				Overall
Team	W		L	PCT	W		L	PCT
Montana†	14	–	4	.778	24	–	9	.727
Sacramento State	13	–	5	.722	18	–	16	.529
Eastern Washington	12	–	6	.667	21	–	12	.636
Northern Colorado	12	–	6	.667	22	–	13	.629
North Dakota	9	–	9	.500	17	–	15	.531
Montana State	9	–	9	.500	15	–	15	.500
Northern Arizona	9	–	9	.500	13	–	17	.433
Idaho	8	–	10	.444	14	–	15	.483
Idaho State	8	–	10	.444	13	–	17	.433
Southern Utah	6	–	12	.333	13	–	15	.464
Weber State	6	–	12	.333	11	–	18	.379
Portland State	2	–	16	.111	4	–	25	.138
† 2015 Big Sky tournament winner As of March 26, 2015; Rankings from AP poll

The 2014–15 Northern Colorado Bears women's basketball team represented the University of Northern Colorado during the 2014–15 NCAA Division I women's basketball season. The Bears were led by first year head coach Kamie Ethridge and played their home games at the Bank of Colorado Arena. They were a member of the Big Sky Conference. They finished the season 21–12, 12–6 in Big Sky for a tie to finish in third place. They advance to the championship game 2015 Big Sky Conference women's basketball tournament, where they lost to Montana. They were invited to the 2015 Women's National Invitation Tournament, where they defeated Colorado State and South Dakota in the first and second rounds before losing to UCLA in the third round.

== Roster ==
2014–15 Northern Colorado Bears women's basketball team
Players
Coaches

Pos.	#	Name	Height	Year	Previous school	Hometown
G	1	Shelby Dougherty (redshirt)	5 ft 9 in (1.75 m)	Jr	Troy HS; Seattle	Fullerton, CA
G	2	Savannah Scott	5 ft 7 in (1.7 m)	Fr	Westmont HS	Campbell, CA
G	3	D'shara Strange	5 ft 10 in (1.78 m)	Sr	Fountain-Fort Carson HS	Fountain, CO
G	5	Jamie Derrieux	5 ft 10 in (1.78 m)	RS Jr	Grand Junction HS	Grand Junction, CO
G	10	Savannah Smith	5 ft 6 in (1.68 m)	Fr	Fossil Ridge HS	Fort Collins, CO
F	14	Kourteney Zadina	6 ft 2 in (1.88 m)	So	Seward HS	Seward, NE
G	15	Katie Longwell	5 ft 6 in (1.68 m)	So	Chaparral HS	Parker, CO
G	20	Lindsay Mallon	6 ft 0 in (1.83 m)	So	Highlands Ranch HS	Lone Tree, CO
F	22	Amber Van Deudekom	5 ft 11 in (1.8 m)	Sr	Brea Olinda HS	Brea, CA
G	24	Kyleigh Hiser	5 ft 9 in (1.75 m)	Jr	Laramie HS	Laramie, WY
F/C	31	Rebecca Howell	6 ft 1 in (1.85 m)	Jr	Bishop Machebeuf Catholic HS	Denver, CO
G	33	Kianna Williams	5 ft 9 in (1.75 m)	Fr	Lake Elsinore HS	Perris, CA
G	41	Stephanie Lee	6 ft 1 in (1.85 m)	Sr	Natrona County HS	Casper, WY

Head coach

- Kamie Ethridge

Assistant coach(es)

- Shalee Lehning
- Kelly Moylan
- Deb Patterson

Legend

- (C) Team captain
- (S) Suspended
- (I) Ineligible
- (W) Walk-on
- Injured
- Current redshirt

Roster

== Schedule ==
Date time, TV	Rank^{#}	Opponent^{#}	Result	Record	Site (attendance) city, state
Exhibition
11/01/2014*; 2:00 pm		CSU–Pueblo	W 70–44	–	Bank of Colorado Arena (318); Greeley, CO
Regular season
11/14/2014*; 5:00 pm		at SMU	W 57–44	1–0	Moody Coliseum (7,000); Dallas, TX
11/17/2014*; 10:30 am		at North Texas	W 53–48	2–0	The Super Pit (2,947); Denton, TX
11/24/2014*; 5:00 pm		Western State Colorado	W 85–37	3–0	Bank of Colorado Arena (412); Greeley, CO
11/28/2014*; 6:00 pm		at Omaha	W 67–58	4–0	Lee & Helene Sapp Fieldhouse (184); Omaha, NE
11/30/2014*; 1:00 pm		at No. 15 Nebraska	L 56–63	4–1	Pinnacle Bank Arena (4,975); Lincoln, NE
12/02/2014*; 7:00 pm		Air Force	W 76–35	5–1	Bank of Colorado Arena (538); Greeley, CO
12/06/2014*; 2:00 pm		South Dakota State	L 48–71	5–2	Bank of Colorado Arena (287); Greeley, CO
12/10/2014*; 7:00 pm		Grand Canyon	W 66–47	6–2	Bank of Colorado Arena (481); Greeley, CO
12/14/2014*; 7:00 pm		at Utah State	L 61–65	6–3	Smith Spectrum (341); Logan, UT
12/17/2014*; 5:00 pm		at South Florida	L 43–84	6–4	USF Sun Dome (1,275); Tampa, FL
12/19/2014*; 1:30 pm, ESPN3		at Florida Gulf Coast	L 56–69	6–5	Alico Arena (1,207); Fort Myers, FL
01/01/2015; 2:00 pm		Montana	L 58–64	6–6 (0–1)	Bank of Colorado Arena (440); Greeley, CO
01/03/2015; 2:00 pm		Montana State	W 80–61	7–6 (1–1)	Bank of Colorado Arena (315); Greeley, CO
01/08/2015; 8:00 pm		at Portland State	W 68–54	8–6 (2–1)	Stott Center (248); Portland, OR
01/10/2015; 3:00 pm		at Sacramento State	L 71–76	8–7 (2–2)	Colberg Court (403); Sacramento, CA
01/17/2015; 2:00 pm		North Dakota	L 58–68	8–8 (2–3)	Bank of Colorado Arena (478); Greeley, CO
01/22/2015; 7:00 pm		Eastern Washington	W 64–56	9–8 (3–3)	Bank of Colorado Arena (640); Greeley, CO
01/24/2015; 2:00 pm		Idaho	W 70–52	10–8 (4–3)	Bank of Colorado Arena (799); Greeley, CO
01/29/2015; 7:00 pm		at Idaho State	L 61–70	10–9 (4–4)	Reed Gym (984); Pocatello, ID
01/31/2015; 2:00 pm		at Weber State	L 52–59	10–10 (4–5)	Dee Events Center (779); Ogden, UT
02/05/2015; 7:00 pm		Northern Arizona	L 49–51	10–11 (4–6)	Bank of Colorado Arena (545); Greeley, CO
02/07/2015; 2:00 pm		Southern Utah	W 87–58	11–11 (5–6)	Bank of Colorado Arena (412); Greeley, CO
02/12/2015; 7:00 pm		at Montana State	W 84–63	12–11 (6–6)	Worthington Arena (897); Bozeman, MT
02/14/2015; 2:00 pm		at Montana	W 52–51	13–11 (7–6)	Dahlberg Arena (3,220); Missoula, MT
02/19/2015; 7:00 pm		Sacramento State	W 78–76	14–11 (8–6)	Bank of Colorado Arena (510); Greeley, CO
02/21/2015; 2:00 pm		Portland State	W 90–50	15–11 (9–6)	Bank of Colorado Arena (623); Greeley, CO
02/26/2015; 7:00 pm		at Southern Utah	W 88–66	16–11 (10–6)	Centrum Arena (789); Cedar City, UT
02/28/2015; 8:00 pm		at Northern Arizona	W 88–67	17–11 (11–6)	Walkup Skydome (455); Flagstaff, AZ
03/07/2015; 1:00 pm		at North Dakota	W 67–56	18–11 (12–6)	Betty Engelstad Sioux Center (1,646); Grand Forks, ND
Big Sky Women's Tournament
03/11/2015; 1:30 pm		vs. North Dakota; Quarterfinals	W 72–64	19–11	Dahlberg Arena (269); Missoula, MT
03/13/2015; 11:30 am		vs. Sacramento State; Semifinals	W 81–79 ^{OT}	20–11	Dahlberg Arena (1,382); Missoula, MT
03/14/2015; 2:00 pm		at Montana; Championship Game	L 49–60	20–12	Dahlberg Arena (3,811); Missoula, MT
WNIT
03/19/2015*; 7:00 pm		at Colorado State; First Round	W 53–48	21–12	Moby Arena (1,367); Fort Collins, CO
03/22/2015*; 5:00 pm		South Dakota; Second Round	W 59–58	22–12	Bank of Colorado Arena (1,233); Greeley, CO
03/26/2015*; 8:00 pm		at UCLA; Third Round	L 60–74	22–13	Pauley Pavilion (760); Los Angeles, CA
*Non-conference game. ^{#}Rankings from AP Poll. (#) Tournament seedings in parentheses. All times are in Mountain Time.

== See also ==
- 2014–15 Northern Colorado Bears men's basketball team
