= 2015 Mountain West Conference women's basketball tournament =

US college basketball tournament

- Classification: Division I
- Season: 2014–15
- Teams: 11
- Site: Thomas & Mack Center; Paradise, NV
- Champions: Boise State (1st MW- 2nd overall title)
- Winning coach: Gordy Presnell (1st title)
- Television: MWN

The 2015 Mountain West Conference women's basketball tournament was held on March 9–13, 2015 at the Thomas & Mack Center in Las Vegas, Nevada. As with last year, the top 5 seeds got the first round bye. For the 3rd year in a row, Mountain West Network carried all games of the tournament. This year they also added the championship game to their schedule. The tournament champion received the Mountain West's only bid to the 2015 NCAA tournament.

2014–15 Mountain West Conference women's basketball standings
	Conf.				Overall
Team	W		L	PCT	W		L	PCT
Colorado State	15	–	3	.833	23	–	8	.742
New Mexico	14	–	4	.778	21	–	13	.618
Fresno State	13	–	5	.722	23	–	10	.697
Boise State †	11	–	7	.611	21	–	11	.656
Wyoming	10	–	8	.556	16	–	14	.533
UNLV	10	–	8	.556	13	–	17	.433
San Diego State	8	–	10	.444	12	–	19	.387
San Jose State	7	–	11	.389	15	–	17	.469
Nevada	5	–	13	.278	9	–	21	.300
Utah State	5	–	13	.278	8	–	23	.258
Air Force	1	–	17	.056	2	–	28	.067
† 2015 MWC tournament winner Rankings from AP poll

== Seeds ==
Teams are seeded by conference record, with a ties broken by record between the tied teams followed by record against the regular-season champion, if necessary.

Seed	School	Conf (Overall)	Tiebreaker
#1	Colorado State	15–3 (23–6)	
#2	New Mexico	14–4 (18–11)	
#3	Fresno State	13–5 (21–8)	
#4	Boise State	11–7 (19–10)	
#5	UNLV	10–8 (13–16)	1–1 vs. Wyoming, 1–1 vs. New Mexico
#6	Wyoming	10–8 (15–13)	1–1 vs. Wyoming, 0–2 vs. New Mexico
#7	San Diego State	8–10 (11–18)	
#8	San Jose State	7–11 (13–16)	
#9	Utah State	5–13 (8–22)	1–1 vs. Nevada, 1–1 vs. San Jose State
#10	Nevada	5–13 (9–20)	1–1 vs. Utah State, 0–2 vs. San Jose State
#11	Air Force	1–17 (2–27)	

== Schedule ==
Game	Time*	Matchup^{#}	Television	TV Announcers	MW Radio Announcers
First round – Monday, March 9
1	2:00 pm	#8 San Jose State vs. #9 Utah State	MWN	Rich Cellini & Krista Blunk	Nate Kreckman & Robert Smith
2	4:30 pm	#7 San Diego State vs. #10 Nevada	MWN	Rich Cellini & Krista Blunk	Brett Grant & Robert Smith
3	7:00 pm	#6 Wyoming vs. #11 Air Force	MWN	Rich Cellini & Krista Blunk	Mitch Moss & Marty Fletcher
Quarterfinals – Tuesday, March 10
4	Noon	#1 Colorado State vs. #8 San Jose State	MWN	Rich Cellini & Krista Blunk	Chad Andrus & Marty Fletcher
5	2:30 pm	#4 Boise State vs. #5 UNLV	MWN	Rich Cellini & Krista Blunk	Nate Kreckman & Marty Fletcher
6	6:00 pm	#2 New Mexico vs. #7 San Diego State	MWN	Rich Cellini & Krista Blunk	Chad Andrus & Robert Smith
7	8:30 pm	#3 Fresno State vs. #6 Wyoming	MWN	Rich Cellini & Krista Blunk	Nate Kreckman & Robert Smith
Semifinals – Wednesday, March 11
8	6:00 pm	#4 Boise State vs. #8 San Jose State	MWN	Rich Cellini & Krista Blunk	Chad Andrus & Robert Smith
9	8:30 pm	#2 New Mexico vs. #3 Fresno State	MWN	Rich Cellini & Krista Blunk	Nate Kreckman & Robert Smith
Championship – Friday, March 13
10	12:00 pm	#2 New Mexico vs. #4 Boise State	MWN	Rich Cellini & Krista Blunk	Chad Andrus & Robert Smith
*Game Times in PT. #-Rankings denote tournament seeding.

== Bracket ==
First round Monday, March 9 MWN
8	San Jose State	99
9	Utah State	85
7	San Diego State	70
10	Nevada	48
6	Wyoming	70
11	Air Force	48

Quarterfinals; Tuesday, March 10; MWN
1	Colorado State	55
8	San Jose State	64
4	Boise State	64
5	UNLV	46
2	New Mexico	57
7	San Diego State	56
3	Fresno State	74
6	Wyoming	66

Semifinals; Wednesday, March 11; MWN
8	San Jose State	67
4	Boise State	76
2	New Mexico	64
3	Fresno State	53

Championship; Friday, March 13; MWN
4	Boise State	66
2	New Mexico	60
