= 2014–15 West Coast Conference women's basketball season =

- League: NCAA Division I
- Sport: Women's basketball
- Teams: 10
- TV partner(s): National: ESPNU, BYUtv, TheW.tv; Regional: SWX, TV-32 Malibu

Regular season
- Season champions: Gonzaga
- Runners-up: San Diego
- Season MVP: Morgan Bailey, BYU
- Top scorer: Lexi Eaton, BYU

Tournament
- Champions: BYU
- Runners-up: San Francisco
- Finals MVP: Lexi Eaton, BYU

Basketball seasons
- ← 13–14 15–16 →

2014–15 West Coast Conference women's basketball standings
	Conf.				Overall
Team	W		L	PCT	W		L	PCT
Gonzaga	16	–	2	.889	26	–	8	.765
San Diego	14	–	4	.778	25	–	7	.781
Pacific	13	–	5	.722	21	–	10	.677
Saint Mary's	13	–	5	.722	23	–	11	.676
BYU †	12	–	6	.667	23	–	10	.697
San Francisco	8	–	10	.444	19	–	14	.576
Santa Clara	5	–	13	.278	11	–	18	.379
Loyola Marymount	4	–	14	.222	7	–	24	.226
Pepperdine	3	–	15	.167	8	–	22	.267
Portland	2	–	16	.111	4	–	26	.133
† Tournament winner As of March 29, 2015; Rankings from AP poll

The 2014–15 West Coast Conference women's basketball season began with practices in October 2014 and ended with the 2015 West Coast Conference women's basketball tournament at the Orleans Arena March 5–10, 2015 in Paradise, Nevada. The regular season began in November, with the conference schedule starting at the end of December.

This was the 30th season for WCC women's basketball, which began in the 1985–86 season when the league was known as the West Coast Athletic Conference (WCAC). It was also the 26th season under the West Coast Conference name (the conference began as the California Basketball Association in 1952, became the WCAC in 1956, and dropped the word "Athletic" in 1989).

== Pre-season ==
- Pre-season media day took place in October at the Time Warner Cable SportsNet and Time Warner Cable Deportes Studios. Video interviews were hosted on the WCC's streaming video outlet, TheW.tv, beginning at 11:30 AM PDT. Jeff Lampe of WCC Live interviewed each coach and got a preview of their respective season. The regional television schedule announcement, the Pre-season Conference team, and the pre-season coaches rankings were some of the additional events that took place.

=== 2014–15 West Coast Women's Basketball Media Poll ===
Rank, School (first-place votes), Points
1. Gonzaga (7), 78
2. BYU (2), 71
3. San Diego (1), 65
4. Pacific, 60
5. Saint Mary's, 48
6. San Francisco, 37
7. Portland, 32
8. Loyola Marymount, 27
9. Pepperdine, 17
10. Santa Clara, 15

=== 2014–15 West Coast Women's Preseason All-West Conference Team ===
Player, School, Yr., Pos.
Morgan Bailey, BYU, Sr., F
Zhane Dikes, San Francisco, Jr., G
Lexi Eaton, BYU, Jr., G
Nici Gilday, Santa Clara, Sr., G
Sunny Greinacher, Gonzaga, Sr., F
Malina Hood, San Diego, Jr., F
Deanna Johnson, Loyola Marymount, Jr., G
Kendall Kenyon, Pacific, Sr., F
Taylor Proctor, San Francisco, Jr., F
Jasmine Wooton, Portland, Sr., G

== Rankings ==
The AP Poll does not do a post-season rankings. As a result, their last rankings are Week 19. The Coaches Poll does a post-season poll and the end of the NCAA Tournament.

Legend
	Improvement in ranking
	Drop in ranking
RV	Received votes but were not ranked in Top 25 of poll

		Pre/ Wk 1	Wk 2	Wk 3	Wk 4	Wk 5	Wk 6	Wk 7	Wk 8	Wk 9	Wk 10	Wk 11	Wk 12	Wk 13	Wk 14	Wk 15	Wk 16	Wk 17	Wk 18	Wk 19	Post
BYU	AP	RV																			
BYU	C	RV	RV																		
Gonzaga	AP	RV	24	RV										RV							
Gonzaga	C	RV	RV	RV																	
Loyola Marymount	AP																				
Loyola Marymount	C																				
Pacific	AP																				
Pacific	C																				
Pepperdine	AP																				
Pepperdine	C																				
Portland	AP																				
Portland	C																				
Saint Mary's	AP																				
Saint Mary's	C																				
San Diego	AP																				
San Diego	C																				
San Francisco	AP																				
San Francisco	C																				
Santa Clara	AP																				
Santa Clara	C																				

== Non-Conference games ==
- Gonzaga defeated #22 Dayton 75—65.
- Saint Mary's won the 2014 Hilton Concord Classic.
- Santa Clara won the 2014 Air Force Classic.
- Loyola Marymount won the 2014 DoubleTree LA Thanksgiving Classic.

== Conference games ==
=== Composite Matrix ===
This table summarizes the head-to-head results between teams in conference play. (x) indicates games remaining this season.

	BYU	Gonzaga	LMU	Pacific	Pepperdine	Portland	Saint Mary's	San Diego	San Francisco	Santa Clara
vs. Brigham Young	-	2–0	0–2	1–1	0–2	0–2	2–0	1–1	0–2	0–2
vs. Gonzaga	0–2	–	0–2	1–1	0–2	0–2	0–2	1–1	0–2	0–2
vs. Loyola Marymount	2–0	2–0	–	2–0	1–1	1–1	2–0	2–0	2–0	0–2
vs. Pacific	1–1	1–1	0–2	-	0–2	0–2	0–2	2–0	1–1	0–2
vs. Pepperdine	2–0	2–0	1–1	2–0	-	1–1	2–0	2–0	1–1	2–0
vs. Portland	2–0	2–0	1–1	2–0	1–1	-	2–0	2–0	2–0	2–0
vs. Saint Mary's	0–2	2–0	0–2	2–0	0–2	0–2	-	0–2	1–1	0–2
vs. San Diego	1–1	1–1	0–2	0–2	0–2	0–2	2–0	-	0–2	0–2
vs. San Francisco	2–0	2–0	0–2	1–1	1–1	0–2	1–1	2–0	-	1–1
vs. Santa Clara	2–0	2–0	2–0	2–0	0–2	0–2	2–0	2–0	1–1	-
Total	12–6	16–2	4–14	13–5	3–15	2–16	13–5	14–4	8–10	5-13

== Conference tournament ==
- March 5–10, 2015– West Coast Conference Basketball Tournament, Orleans Arena, Paradise, Nevada.

First round Thursday, March 5 BYUtv
8	Loyola Marymount	68
9	Pepperdine	67
7	Santa Clara	66
10	Portland	58

Quarterfinals; Thurs & Fri, Mar 5-6; BYUtv
1	Gonzaga	70
8	Loyola Marymount	50
4	Saint Mary's	64
5	BYU	65
2	San Diego	51
7	Santa Clara	42
3	Pacific	64
6	San Francisco	74

Semifinals; Monday, March 9 BYUtv
1	Gonzaga	55
5	BYU	61
2	San Diego	57
6	San Francisco	65

Championship Game; Tuesday, March 10; ESPNU
5	BYU	76
6	San Francisco	65

== Head coaches ==
The 2014-15 season saw a lot of new faces to the WCC. Three of the conference members had new head coaches. Kelly Graves left the Zags to become the new head coach at Oregon, Jim Sollars retired, and Jennifer Mountain did not have her contract renewed. As a result Gonzaga, Portland, and Santa Clara all introduced new coaches into the fold.

Jeff Judkins, BYU
Lisa Mispley Fortier, Gonzaga
Charity Elliott, Loyola Marymount
Lynne Roberts, Pacific
Ryan Weisenberg, Pepperdine
Cheryl Sorensen, Portland
Paul Thomas, Saint Mary's
Cindy Fisher, San Diego
Jennifer Azzi, San Francisco
JR Payne, Santa Clara

== Postseason ==
=== NCAA tournament ===
Seed	Bracket	School	First Round	Second Round	Sweet 16	Elite 8	Final Four	Championship
11	Spokane Regional	Gonzaga	#6 George Washington; Mar. 20, Corvallis; W, 82–69	#3 Oregon State; Mar. 22, Corvallis; W, 76–64	#2 Tennessee; Mar. 28, Spokane; L, 69–73 (OT)			
14	Albany Regional	BYU	#3 Louisville; Mar. 21, Tampa; L, 53–86					
2 Bids	W-L (%):	TOTAL: 2–2 .500	1–1 .500	1–0 1.000	0–1 .000	0–0 –	0–0 –	0–0 –

=== WNIT ===
School	First Round	Second Round	Third Round	Quarterfinals	Semifinals	Championship
Saint Mary's	Hawaii; Mar. 20, Moraga; W, 92–88 (OT)	Fresno State; Mar. 23, Moraga; W, 83–64	Sacramento State; Mar. 26, Sacramento; W, 77–69	UCLA; Mar. 29, Los Angeles; L, 66–82		
San Diego	Long Beach State; Mar. 19, San Diego; W, 63–56	UCLA; Mar. 22, San Diego; L, 58–63				
Pacific	Sacramento State; Mar. 19, Stockton; L, 79–87					
San Francisco	Fresno State; Mar. 19, Fresno; L, 73–79					
4 Bids; W-L (%); TOTAL: 4–4 .500	2–2 .500	1–1 .500	1–0 1.000	0–1 .000	0–0 –	0–0 –

=== WBI ===
No WCC teams participated in the 2015 WBI.

== Awards and honors ==
=== WCC Player-of-the-Week ===
The WCC player of the week awards are given each Monday once the season begins.

- Nov. 17- Maya Hood, G, San Diego
- Dec. 1- Lauren Nicholson, G, Saint Mary's
- Dec. 15- Morgan Bailey, F, BYU
- Dec. 30- Kendall Kenyon, F, Pacific
- Jan. 12- Kendall Kenyon, F, Pacific
- Jan. 26- Elle Tinkle, G, Gonzaga
- Feb. 9- Lexi Eaton, G, BYU
- Feb. 23- Leslie Lopez-Wood, G, Loyola Marymount
- Nov. 24- Sophia Ederaine, F, San Diego
- Dec. 8- Nici Gilday, G, Santa Clara
- Dec. 22- Taylor Proctor, F, San Francisco
- Jan. 5- Lauren Nicholson, G, Saint Mary's
- Jan. 19- Sophia Ederaine, F, San Diego
- Feb. 2- Morgan Bailey, F, BYU
- Feb. 16- Shannon Mauldin, G, Saint Mary's
- Mar. 2- Taylor Proctor, F, San Francisco

=== College Madness West Coast Player of the Week ===
College Madness WCC player of the Week Awards will be given every Sunday once the season begins.

- Nov. 16- Lindsay Sherbert, G, Gonzaga
- Nov. 30- Lauren Nicholson, G, Saint Mary's
- Dec. 14- Morgan Bailey, F, BYU
- Dec. 28- Kendall Kenyon, F, Pacific
- Jan. 11- Elle Tinkle, G, Gonzaga
- Jan. 25- Taylor Proctor, F, San Francisco
- Feb. 8- Lexi Eaton, G, BYU
- Feb. 22-Sophia Ederaine, F, San Diego
- Nov. 23- Madison Parrish, G, Pacific
- Dec. 7- Lexi Eaton, G, BYU
- Dec. 21- Taylor Proctor, F, San Francisco
- Jan. 4- Morgan Bailey, F, BYU
- Jan. 18- Cassandra Brown, F, Portland
- Feb. 1- Malina Hood, F, San Diego
- Feb. 15- Nici Gilday, G, Santa Clara
- Mar. 1- Taylor Proctor, F, San Francisco

=== All West Coast Conference teams ===
Voting was by conference coaches:

- Player of The Year: Morgan Bailey, BYU
- Newcomer of The Year: Stella Beck, Saint Mary's
- Defensive Player of The Year: Sophia Ederaine, San Diego
- Coach of The Year: Lisa Fortier, Gonzaga; Lynne Roberts, Pacific, & Paul Thomas, Saint Mary's

College Sports Madness Selections

- Player of the Year: Sophia Ederaine, San Diego
- Newcomer of the Year: Stella Beck, Saint Mary's
- Coach of the Year: Lynne Roberts, Pacific

=== All-Conference First team ===
Name	School	Pos.	Year
Morgan Bailey	BYU	F	Senior
Lexi Eaton	BYU	G	Junior
Sophia Ederaine	San Diego	C	Senior
Nici Gilday	Santa Clara	G	Senior
Sunny Greinacher	Gonzaga	F	Senior
Malina Hood	San Diego	G	Junior
Kendall Kenyon	Pacific	F	Senior
Lauren Nicholson	Saint Mary's	G	Junior
Taylor Proctor	San Francisco	F	Junior
Elle Tinkle	Gonzaga	F	Junior

College Sports Madness Selections

Name	School	Pos.	Year
Morgan Bailey	BYU	F	Senior
Lexi Eaton	BYU	G	Junior
Sophia Ederaine	San Diego	C	Senior
Nici Gilday	Santa Clara	G	Senior
Kendall Kenyon	Pacific	F	Senior

=== All-Conference Second team ===
Name	School	Pos.	Year
Keani Albanez	Gonzaga	F	Senior
Cassandra Brown	Portland	F	Senior
Hailie Eackles	Pacific	G	Junior
Shannon Mauldin	Saint Mary's	G	Junior
Bria Richardson	San Diego	G	Senior

College Sports Madness Selections

Name	School	Pos.	Year
Keani Albanez	Gonzaga	F	Senior
Sunny Greinacher	Gonzaga	F	Senior
Malina Hood	San Diego	G	Junior
Lauren Nicholson	Saint Mary's	G	Junior
Taylor Proctor	San Francisco	F	Junior

=== Honorable mention ===
Name	School
Emily Ben-Jumbo	Loyola Marymount
Zhane Dikes	San Francisco
Leslie Lopez-Wood	Pacific
Madison Parrish	Pacific
Carli Rosenthal	Saint Mary's

=== All-Freshman team ===
Name	School	Pos.
Stella Beck	Saint Mary's	G
Makenzie Cast	Loyola Marymount	G
GeAnna Luaulu-Summers	Pacific	G
Olivia Ogwumike	Pepperdine	F
Emma Wolfram	Gonzaga	C

=== All Academic team ===
Player, School	Year	GPA	Major
Emily Ben-Jumbo, Loyola Marymount	Senior	3.33	Communications
Lexi Eaton, BYU	Junior	3.32	Psychology
Sophia Ederaine, San Diego	Senior	3.69	Psychology
Ashley Garfield, BYU	Senior	3.98	School Health
Sunny Greinacher, Gonzaga	Graduate	3.52	Master's in Counseling
Hayley Hendrickson, Saint Mary's	Senior	3.58	Biopshychology
Kari Luttinen, Portland	Senior	3.39	Finance
Bria Richardson, Pepperdine	Senior	3.31	Liberal Arts
Paige Spietz, San Francisco	Senior	3.41	Environmental Science
Elle Tinkle, Gonzaga	Junior	3.44	Nursing

== See also ==
- 2014-15 NCAA Division I women's basketball season
- West Coast Conference women's basketball tournament
- 2014–15 West Coast Conference men's basketball season
- West Coast Conference men's basketball tournament
- 2015 West Coast Conference men's basketball tournament
