= 2014–15 Pacific Tigers women's basketball team =

Intercollegiate basketball season

2014–15 Pacific Tigers women's basketball

WNIT, First Round
- Conference: West Coast Conference
- Record: 21–10 (13–5 WCC)
- Head coach: Lynne Roberts (9th season)
- Assistant coaches: Bradley Davis; Gavin Petersen; Amy VanHollebeke
- Home arena: Alex G. Spanos Center

2014–15 West Coast Conference women's basketball standings
	Conf.				Overall
Team	W		L	PCT	W		L	PCT
Gonzaga	16	–	2	.889	26	–	8	.765
San Diego	14	–	4	.778	25	–	7	.781
Pacific	13	–	5	.722	21	–	10	.677
Saint Mary's	13	–	5	.722	23	–	11	.676
BYU †	12	–	6	.667	23	–	10	.697
San Francisco	8	–	10	.444	19	–	14	.576
Santa Clara	5	–	13	.278	11	–	18	.379
Loyola Marymount	4	–	14	.222	7	–	24	.226
Pepperdine	3	–	15	.167	8	–	22	.267
Portland	2	–	16	.111	4	–	26	.133
† Tournament winner As of March 29, 2015; Rankings from AP poll

The 2014–15 Pacific Tigers women's basketball team represented the University of the Pacific during the 2014–15 NCAA Division I women's basketball season. The Tigers came off of a season of new beginnings after they rejoined the West Coast Conference. Despite the new conference, the Tigers placed third in the WCC and made the WNIT for the third consecutive season. The Tigers were led by ninth year head coach Lynne Roberts and played their home games in the Alex G. Spanos Center. They finished the season 21–10, 13–5 in WCC play to finish in a tie for third place. They lost in the quarterfinals of the 2015 West Coast Conference women's basketball tournament to San Francisco. They were invited to the Women's National Invitation Tournament, where they lost to Sacramento State in the first round.

== Roster ==
2014–15 Pacific Tigers women's basketball team
Players
Coaches

Pos.	#	Name	Height	Year	Previous school	Hometown
G	2	Gena Johnson	5 ft 9 in (1.75 m)	RS Sr	Franklin	Elk Grove, CA
G	3	Kristina Johnson	5 ft 5 in (1.65 m)	Sr	Santa Monica	Santa Monica, CA
G	5	Emily Simons	5 ft 10 in (1.78 m)	So	Box Hill Secondary	Doncaster, Victoria, Australia
F	10	Kendall Kenyon	6 ft 2 in (1.88 m)	Sr	St. Mary's	Stockton, CA
G	11	Madison Parrish	5 ft 8 in (1.73 m)	Sr	Hanford; Fresno State	Hanford, CA
F	12	Erin Butler	5 ft 11 in (1.8 m)	RS So	Mission Viejo; Arizona	Rancho Santa Margarita, CA
G	15	GeAnna Luaulu-Summers	5 ft 9 in (1.75 m)	Fr	Sacred Heart Cathedral	San Francisco, CA
G	20	Unique Coleman	5 ft 10 in (1.78 m)	So	St. Mary's	Stockton, CA
G	21	Claire Conricode	5 ft 9 in (1.75 m)	Sr	Holy Names	Bothell, WA
G/F	22	Desire Finnie	5 ft 11 in (1.8 m)	Fr	Berkeley	Berkeley, CA
G	23	Hailie Eackles	5 ft 9 in (1.75 m)	RS Jr	Pinewood	Sunnyvale, CA
G	30	Najah Queenland	5 ft 10 in (1.78 m)	Fr	Sacramento	Sacramento, CA
F	40	Marjorie Heard	6 ft 1 in (1.85 m)	RS Jr	Glacier Peak	Snohomish, WA
F	44	Jasmine Jenkins	6 ft 2 in (1.88 m)	So	Dougherty Valley	San Ramon, CA

Head coach

- Lynne Roberts (Seattle Pacific)

Assistant coach(es)

- Bradley Davis (California)
- Gavin Petersen (Hawaii Pacific)
- Amy VanHollebeke (Pacific)

Legend

- (C) Team captain
- (S) Suspended
- (I) Ineligible
- (W) Walk-on
- Injured
- Current redshirt

Roster
Last update: 2014-07-20

== Schedule ==
Date time, TV	Rank^{#}	Opponent^{#}	Result	Record	Site (attendance) city, state
Exhibition
11/08/2014*; 4:30 pm, TheW.tv		San Francisco State	W 84–66	–	Alex G. Spanos Center (2,424); Stockton, CA
Regular Season
11/14/2014*; 11:00 am, TheW.tv		Cal State Stanislaus	W 98–67	1–0	Alex G. Spanos Center (1,033); Stockton, CA
11/16/2014*; 4:00 pm, TheW.tv		No. 15 California	L 64–84	1–1	Alex G. Spanos Center (1,201); Stockton, CA
11/21/2014*; 7:00 pm, TheW.tv		Montana	W 62–50	2–1	Alex G. Spanos Center (404); Stockton, CA
11/23/2014*; 1:00 pm, TheW.tv		Iona	W 64–49	3–1	Alex G. Spanos Center (369); Stockton, CA
11/29/2014*; 4:30 pm, BigWest.tv		at UC Davis	L 53–60	3–2	The Pavilion (N/A); Davis, CA
12/02/2014*; 6:30 pm, MW Net		at Nevada	W 64–53	4–2	Lawlor Events Center (828); Reno, NV
12/06/2014*; 9:00 pm, OC Sports		at Hawaiʻi	W 69–61	5–2	Stan Sheriff Center (1,666); Honolulu, HI
12/12/2014*; 7:00 pm, TheW.tv		Cal State Maritime	W 70–23	6–2	Alex G. Spanos Center (N/A); Stockton, CA
12/16/2014*; 7:00 pm, TheW.tv		Utah State	W 70–62	7–2	Alex G. Spanos Center (325); Stockton, CA
12/19/2014*; 7:00 pm, BigWest.tv		vs. New Mexico State; Beach Classic	W 67–62	8–2	Walter Pyramid (721); Long Beach, CA
12/20/2014*; 5:00 pm, BigWest.tv		at Long Beach State; Beach Classic	L 43–53	8–3	Walter Pyramid (708); Long Beach, CA
12/27/2014; 2:00 pm, TheW.tv		at San Francisco	W 92–54	9–3 (1–0)	War Memorial Gymnasium (311); San Francisco, CA
12/29/2014; 7:00 pm, Santa Clara Portal		at Santa Clara	W 61–59	10–3 (2–0)	Leavey Center (N/A); Santa Clara, CA
01/01/2015; 7:00 pm, TheW.tv		Loyola Marymount	W 89–69	11–3 (3–0)	Alex G. Spanos Center (430); Stockton, CA
01/03/2015; 2:00 pm, TheW.tv		Pepperdine	W 77–60	12–3 (4–0)	Alex G. Spanos Center (542); Stockton, CA
01/10/2015; 1:00 pm, TheW.tv		at Saint Mary's	W 88–86 ^{OT}	13–3 (5–0)	McKeon Pavilion (505); Moraga, CA
01/15/2015; 6:00 pm, BYUtv		at BYU	L 72–89	13–4 (5–1)	Marriott Center (498); Provo, UT
01/17/2015; 2:00 pm, TheW.tv		at San Diego	L 52–56	13–5 (5–2)	Jenny Craig Pavilion (543); San Diego, CA
01/22/2015; 7:00 pm, TheW.tv		Portland	W 72–69	14–5 (6–2)	Alex G. Spanos Center (491); Stockton, CA
01/24/2015; 2:00 pm, TheW.tv		Gonzaga	L 63–73	14–6 (6–3)	Alex G. Spanos Center (673); Stockton, CA
01/29/2015; 7:00 pm, WavesCast		at Pepperdine	W 63–59	15–6 (7–3)	Firestone Fieldhouse (167); Malibu, CA
01/31/2015; 2:00 pm, LMUSN		at Loyola Marymount	W 84–61	16–6 (8–3)	Gersten Pavilion (321); Los Angeles, CA
02/07/2015; 2:00 pm, TheW.tv		Saint Mary's	W 61–48	17–6 (9–3)	Alex G. Spanos Center (797); Stockton, CA
02/12/2015; 7:00 pm, TheW.tv		San Diego	L 53–63	17–7 (9–4)	Alex G. Spanos Center (505); Stockton, CA
02/14/2015; 2:00 pm, TheW.tv		BYU	W 86–82	18–7 (10–4)	Alex G. Spanos Center (524); Stockton, CA
02/19/2015; 7:00 pm, Portland Portal		at Portland	W 80–78	19–7 (11–4)	Chiles Center (331); Portland, OR
02/21/2015; 2:00 pm, TheW.tv		at Gonzaga	W 71–59	20–7 (12–4)	McCarthey Athletic Center (6,000); Spokane, WA
02/26/2015; 7:00 pm, TheW.tv		Santa Clara	W 87–75	21–7 (13–4)	Alex G. Spanos Center (612); Stockton, CA
02/28/2015; 2:00 pm, TheW.tv		San Francisco	L 79–91	21–8 (13–5)	Alex G. Spanos Center (805); Stockton, CA
2015 WCC Tournament
03/05/2015; 6:00 pm, BYUtv		vs. San Francisco; Quarterfinals	L 64–74	21–9	Orleans Arena (N/A); Paradise, NV
WNIT
03/19/2015*; 7:00 pm		Sacramento State; First Round	L 79–87	21–10	Alex G. Spanos Center (918); Stockton, CA
*Non-conference game. ^{#}Rankings from AP Poll. (#) Tournament seedings in parentheses. All times are in Pacific Time.

== Rankings ==
+ Regular season polls	Poll	Pre- season	Week 1	Week 2	Week 3	Week 4	Week 5	Week 6	Week 7	Week 8	Week 9	Week 10	Week 11	Week 12	Week 13	Week 14	Week 15	Week 16	Week 17	Week 18 Postseason	Final
AP																					
Coaches																					

Legend
	Increase in ranking
	Decrease in ranking
	No change
(RV)	Received votes
