= 2014–15 Santa Clara Broncos women's basketball team =

Intercollegiate basketball season

2014–15 Santa Clara Broncos women's basketball
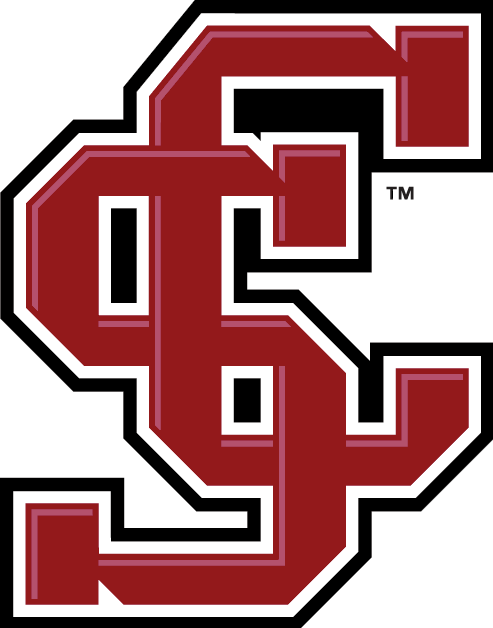

Air Force Classic Champions
- Conference: West Coast Conference
- Record: 11–18 (5–13 WCC)
- Head coach: JR Payne (1st season)
- Assistant coaches: Toriano Towns; Shandrika Lee; Bianca Ziemann
- Home arena: Leavey Center

2014–15 West Coast Conference women's basketball standings
	Conf.				Overall
Team	W		L	PCT	W		L	PCT
Gonzaga	16	–	2	.889	26	–	8	.765
San Diego	14	–	4	.778	25	–	7	.781
Pacific	13	–	5	.722	21	–	10	.677
Saint Mary's	13	–	5	.722	23	–	11	.676
BYU †	12	–	6	.667	23	–	10	.697
San Francisco	8	–	10	.444	19	–	14	.576
Santa Clara	5	–	13	.278	11	–	18	.379
Loyola Marymount	4	–	14	.222	7	–	24	.226
Pepperdine	3	–	15	.167	8	–	22	.267
Portland	2	–	16	.111	4	–	26	.133
† Tournament winner As of March 29, 2015; Rankings from AP poll

The 2014–15 Santa Clara Broncos women's basketball team represented Santa Clara University in the 2014–15 college basketball season. It was head coach JR Payne's first season at Santa Clara. The Broncos were members of the West Coast Conference and played their home games at the Leavey Center. They finished the season 11–18, 5–13 in WCC to finish in seventh place. They advanced to the quarterfinals of the WCC women's tournament, where they lost to San Diego.

== Roster ==
2014–15 Santa Clara Broncos women's basketball team
Players
Coaches

Pos.	#	Name	Height	Year	Previous school	Hometown
F	2	Lori Parkinson	6 ft 1 in (1.85 m)	Jr	Cyprus	West Valley, UT
G	3	Taylor Berry	5 ft 11 in (1.8 m)	Fr	St. Mary's	Martinez, CA
F	5	Beth Carlson	6 ft 2 in (1.88 m)	RS Fr	Archbishop Murphy	Everett, WA
G/F	10	Katie Hawkins	5 ft 11 in (1.8 m)	Jr	Glacier Park	Snohomish, WA
G	12	Nici Gilday	5 ft 7 in (1.7 m)	Sr	Presentation	San Jose, CA
F	15	Marie Bertholdt	6 ft 1 in (1.85 m)	So	Alameda	Alameda, CA
F	20	Courtney Lisowski	6 ft 0 in (1.83 m)	RS So	Archbishop Mitty	Los Gatos, CA
G	21	Raquel Avila	5 ft 5 in (1.65 m)	Sr	St. Ignatius College Prep	S. San Francisco, CA
G	22	Brooke Gallaway	5 ft 11 in (1.8 m)	Jr	Central Valley	Greenacres, WA
F	23	Taylor Williams	6 ft 0 in (1.83 m)	So	ThunderRidge	Highlands Ranch, CO
G	25	Emily Wolph	5 ft 5 in (1.65 m)	Fr	Desert Vista	Phoenix, AZ
G	30	Sidney Rielly	5 ft 10 in (1.78 m)	Fr	Everett	Everett, WA
F	32	Morgan McGwire	6 ft 2 in (1.88 m)	Fr	Reno	Reno, NV
F	44	Maddison Allen	6 ft 3 in (1.91 m)	Jr	John Paul College	Brisbane, Australia
F/C	45	Vanessa Leo	6 ft 4 in (1.93 m)	RS Jr	Archbishop Mitty	San Jose, CA

Head coach

- JR Payne (Saint Mary's)

Assistant coach(es)

- Toriano Towns (Saint Mary's)
- Shandrika Lee (Pepperdine)
- Bianca Ziemann (Loyola Marymount)

Legend

- (C) Team captain
- (S) Suspended
- (I) Ineligible
- (W) Walk-on
- Injured
- Current redshirt

Roster

== Schedule and results ==
Date time, TV	Rank^{#}	Opponent^{#}	Result	Record	Site (attendance) city, state
Exhibition
11/01/2014*; 6:00 pm, Santa Clara Portal		Notre Dame de Namur	W 77–40	-	Leavey Center (N/A); Santa Clara, CA
11/06/2014*; 7:00 pm, Santa Clara Portal		Dominican	W 81–55	-	Leavey Cebter (N/A); Santa Clara, CA
Regular Season
11/14/2014*; 5:00 pm, BigWest.tv		at UC Riverside	L 60–89	0–1	UC Riverside Student Recreation Center (184); Riverside, CA
11/16/2014*; 7:00 pm, Santa Clara Portal		San Francisco State	W 87–41	1–1	Leavey Center (N/A); Santa Clara, CA
11/20/2014*; 7:00 pm, BigWest.tv		at UC Santa Barbara	W 47–33	2–1	The Thunderdome (391); Santa Barbara, CA
11/25/2014*; 12:30 pm		vs. LSU; Puerto Vallarta Hardwood Tournament of Hope	W 69–67	3–1	Puerto Vallarta International Convention Center (275); Puerto Vallarta, Mexico
11/26/2014*; 3:00 pm		vs. Kansas State; Puerto Vallarta Hardwood Tournament of Hope			Puerto Vallarta International Convention Center; Puerto Vallarta, Mexico
11/27/2014*; 12:30 pm		vs. UTEP; Puerto Vallarta Hardwood Tournament of Hope			Puerto Vallarta International Convention Center; Puerto Vallarta, Mexico
12/02/2014*; 7:00 pm, Santa Clara Portal		Cal Poly	L 73–79	3–2	Leavey Center (N/A); Santa Clara, CA
12/05/2014*; 3:30 pm, MW Net		vs. UC Davis; Air Force Classic	W 79–76	4–2	Clune Arena (N/A); Colorado Springs, CO
12/06/2014*; 1:00 pm, MW Net		at Air Force; Air Force Classic	W 85–64	5–2	Clune Arena (373); Colorado Springs, CO
12/14/2014*; 7:00 pm, P12N		at No. 7 Stanford	L 43–82	5–3	Maples Pavilion (3,527); Stanford, CA
12/18/2014*; 6:00 pm		at Oregon	L 88–92 ^{2OT}	5–4	Matthew Knight Arena (1,245); Eugene, OR
12/27/2014; 7:00 pm, Santa Clara Portal		Saint Mary's	L 61–62	5–5 (0–1)	Leavey Center (250); Santa Clara, CA
12/29/2014; 7:00 pm, Santa Clara Portal		Pacific	L 59–61	5–6 (0–2)	Leavey Center (N/A); Santa Clara, CA
01/01/2015; 1:00 pm, TheW.tv		at BYU	L 55–84	5–7 (0–3)	Marriott Center (693); Provo, UT
01/03/2015; 2:00 pm, TheW.tv		at San Diego	L 59–72	5–8 (0–4)	Jenny Craig Pavilion (414); San Diego, CA
01/08/2015; 7:00 pm, Santa Clara Portal		Portland	W 83–68	6–8 (1–4)	Leavey Center (365); Santa Clara, CA
01/10/2015; 2:00 pm, Santa Clara Portal		Gonzaga	L 70–78	6–9 (1–5)	Leavey Center (371); Santa Clara, CA
01/17/2015; 2:00 pm, TheW.tv		at San Francisco	L 45–62	6–10 (1–6)	War Memorial Gymnasium (348); San Francisco, CA
01/22/2015; 7:00 pm, LMUSN		at Loyola Marymount	L 57–82	6–11 (1–7)	Gersten Pavilion (321); Los Angeles, CA
01/24/2015; 12:00 pm, WavesCast		at Pepperdine	W 65–54	7–11 (2–7)	Firestone Fieldhouse (214); Malibu, CA
01/29/2015; 7:00 pm, Santa Clara Portal		San Diego	L 61–64	7–12 (2–8)	Leavey Center (250); Santa Clara, CA
01/31/2015; 2:00 pm, Santa Clara Portal		BYU	L 56–58	7–13 (2–9)	Leavey Center (315); Santa Clara, CA
02/05/2015; 6:00 pm, TheW.tv		at Gonzaga	L 49–76	7–14 (2–10)	McCarthey Athletic Center (5,082); Spokane, WA
02/07/2015; 2:00 pm, Portland Portal		at Portland	W 64–55	8–14 (3–10)	Chiles Center (390); Portland, OR
02/14/2015; 2:00 pm, Santa Clara Portal		San Francisco	W 80–79 ^{OT}	9–14 (4–10)	Leavey Center (N/A); Santa Clara, CA
02/19/2015; 7:00 pm, Santa Clara Portal		Pepperdine	W 84–66	10–14 (5–10)	Leavey Center (N/A); Santa Clara, CA
02/21/2015; 2:00 pm, Santa Clara Portal		Loyola Marymount	L 65–73	10–15 (5–11)	Leavey Center (N/A); Santa Clara, CA
02/26/2015; 7:00 pm, TheW.tv		at Pacific	L 75–87	10–16 (5–12)	Alex G. Spanos Center (612); Stockton, CA
02/28/2015; 1:00 pm, TheW.tv		at Saint Mary's	L 71–74	10–17 (5–13)	McKeon Pavilion (534); Moraga, CA
2015 WCC Tournament
03/05/2015; 2:00 pm, BYUtv		vs. Portland; First Round	W 66–58	11–17	Orleans Arena (N/A); Las Vegas, NV
03/06/2015; 2:00 pm, BYUtv		vs. San Diego; Quarterfinals	L 42–51	11–18	Orleans Arena (7,110); Las Vegas, NV
*Non-conference game. ^{#}Rankings from AP Poll. (#) Tournament seedings in parentheses. All times are in Pacific Time.

== Rankings ==
+ Regular season polls	Poll	Pre- Season	Week 1	Week 2	Week 3	Week 4	Week 5	Week 6	Week 7	Week 8	Week 9	Week 10	Week 11	Week 12	Week 13	Week 14	Week 15	Week 16	Week 17	Week 18	Final
AP																					
Coaches																					

Legend
	Increase in ranking
	Decrease in ranking
	No change
(RV)	Received votes
(NR)	Not ranked

== See also ==
- 2014–15 Santa Clara Broncos men's basketball team
- Santa Clara Broncos women's basketball
