= 2014–15 Saint Mary's Gaels women's basketball team =

Intercollegiate basketball season

2014–15 Saint Mary's Gaels women's basketball

Hilton Concord Classic Champions

WNIT, Quarterfinals
- Conference: West Coast Conference
- Record: 23–11 (13–5 WCC)
- Head coach: Paul Thomas (9th season)
- Assistant coaches: Tracy Sanders; Allyson Fasnacht; Lisa O'Meara
- Home arena: McKeon Pavilion

2014–15 West Coast Conference women's basketball standings
	Conf.				Overall
Team	W		L	PCT	W		L	PCT
Gonzaga	16	–	2	.889	26	–	8	.765
San Diego	14	–	4	.778	25	–	7	.781
Pacific	13	–	5	.722	21	–	10	.677
Saint Mary's	13	–	5	.722	23	–	11	.676
BYU †	12	–	6	.667	23	–	10	.697
San Francisco	8	–	10	.444	19	–	14	.576
Santa Clara	5	–	13	.278	11	–	18	.379
Loyola Marymount	4	–	14	.222	7	–	24	.226
Pepperdine	3	–	15	.167	8	–	22	.267
Portland	2	–	16	.111	4	–	26	.133
† Tournament winner As of March 29, 2015; Rankings from AP poll

The 2014–15 Saint Mary's Gaels women's basketball team represented Saint Mary's College of California in the 2014–15 college basketball season. It was head coach Paul Thomas's ninth season at Saint Mary's. The Gaels, members of the West Coast Conference, played their home games at the McKeon Pavilion. They finished the season 23–11, 13–5 in WCC play to finish in a tie for third place. They lost in the quarterfinals of the WCC women's basketball tournament to BYU. They were invited to the Women's National Invitation Tournament, where they defeated Hawaii in the first round, Fresno State in the second round and Sacramento State in the third round before losing to UCLA in the quarterfinals.

== Roster ==
2014–15 Saint Mary's Gaels women's basketball team
Players
Coaches

Pos.	#	Name	Height	Year	Previous school	Hometown
G	1	Lauren Nicholson	6 ft 0 in (1.83 m)	Jr	Woolooware	Sydney, Australia
G	3	Devyn Galland	5 ft 8 in (1.73 m)	RS So	Lewis & Clark; Oregon	Spokane, WA
G	5	Hannah Kaser	5 ft 10 in (1.78 m)	Jr	Australian Institute of Sport	Eltham, Victoria, Australia
G	10	Carly Turner	5 ft 11 in (1.8 m)	Fr	Australia Institute of Sport	Sydney, Australia
F	11	Valerie Moore	5 ft 10 in (1.78 m)	RS So	Modesto Christian	Merced, CA
F	12	Hayley Hendricksen	6 ft 0 in (1.83 m)	Sr	Lewis and Clark	Spokane, WA
G	14	Shannon Mauldin	5 ft 9 in (1.75 m)	Jr	Saint Mary's	San Pablo, CA
G	21	Stella Beck	6 ft 0 in (1.83 m)	Fr	Hutt Valley	Lower Hutt, New Zealand
F	22	Devon Brookshire (redshirt)	6 ft 2 in (1.88 m)	Jr	Bishop Montgomery; Northwestern	Rancho Palos Verdes, CA
G	23	Alia McCoy	5 ft 11 in (1.8 m)	RS Fr	Canyon	Santa Clarita, CA
G	24	Samira McDonald	5 ft 9 in (1.75 m)	RS So	River Ridge	Lacey, WA
F	25	Carli Rosenthal	6 ft 3 in (1.91 m)	Sr	Coeur d'Alene	Coeur d'Alene, ID
F	30	Amanda Arter	6 ft 2 in (1.88 m)	Jr	Brea Olinda	Brea, CA
F	32	Lisa Janko	6 ft 1 in (1.85 m)	Fr	Rhein MB II	Essen, Germany
C	33	Sabrina Engelstad	6 ft 3 in (1.91 m)	So	Heritage	Brentwood, CA

Head coach

- Paul Thomas (Wayne State College)

Assistant coach(es)

- Tracy Sanders (St. Mary's)
- Allyson Fasnacht (Liberty)
- Lisa O'Meara (St. Mary's)

Legend

- (C) Team captain
- (S) Suspended
- (I) Ineligible
- (W) Walk-on
- Injured
- Current redshirt

Roster

== Schedule and results ==
Date time, TV	Rank^{#}	Opponent^{#}	Result	Record	Site (attendance) city, state
Regular Season
11/16/2014*; 1:00 pm, TheW.tv		Boston College	L 72–82	0–1	McKeon Pavilion (277); Moraga, CA
11/22/2014*; 11:00 am, BigWest.tv		at UC Davis	W 57–55	1–1	The Pavilion (220); Davis, CA
11/24/2014*; 6:00 pm, TheW.tv		Sacramento State	W 99–91	2–1	McKeon Pavilion (445); Moraga, CA
11/28/2014*; 2:00 pm, TheW.tv		Howard; Hilton Concord Classic	W 80–55	3–1	McKeon Pavilion (353); Moraga, CA
11/29/2014*; 2:00 pm, TheW.tv		Iowa State; Hilton Concord Classic	W 67–63	4–1	McKeon Pavilion (379); Moraga, CA
12/04/2014*; 6:00 pm, TheW.tv		Cal State Northridge	W 73–63	5–1	McKeon Pavilion (299); Moraga, CA
12/06/2014*; 5:00 pm, TheW.tv		USC	W 64–58	6–1	McKeon Pavilion (559); Moraga, CA
12/12/2014*; 7:00 pm, MW Network		at Fresno State	L 56–60	6–2	Save Mart Center (2,084); Fresno, CA
12/14/2014*; 2:00 pm, BigWest.tv		at Cal Poly	W 65–64 ^{OT}	7–2	Mott Gym (307); San Luis Obispo, CA
12/19/2014*; 4:00 pm, Cavaliers Live		at Virginia	L 49–62	7–3	John Paul Jones Arena (2,950); Charlottesville, VA
12/21/2014*; 9:00 am, A10 Digital		at George Washington	L 52–70	7–4	Charles E. Smith Athletic Center (452); Washington, D.C.
12/27/2014; 2:00 pm, Santa Clara Portal		at Santa Clara	W 62–61	8–4 (1–0)	Leavey Center (250); Santa Clara, CA
12/29/2014; 7:00 pm, TheW.tv		at San Francisco	W 68–66	9–4 (2–0)	War Memorial Gymnasium (244); San Francisco, CA
01/01/2015; 6:00 pm, TheW.tv		Pepperdine	W 73–68	10–4 (3–0)	McKeon Pavilion (303); Moraga, CA
01/03/2015; 1:00 pm, TheW.tv		Loyola Marymount	W 72–71	11–4 (4–0)	McKeon Pavilion (439); Moraga, CA
01/10/2015; 1:00 pm, TheW.tv		Pacific	L 86–88 ^{OT}	11–5 (4–1)	McKeon Pavilion (505); Moraga, CA
01/15/2015; 6:00 pm, TheW.tv		at San Diego	W 57–56	12–5 (5–1)	Jenny Craig Pavilion (590); San Diego, CA
01/17/2015; 1:00 pm, BYUtv		at BYU	W 61–51	13–5 (6–1)	Marriott Center (797); Provo, UT
01/22/2015; 6:00 pm, TheW.tv		Gonzaga	L 42–52	13–6 (6–2)	McKeon Pavilion (603); Moraga, CA
01/24/2015; 1:00 pm, TheW.tv		Portland	W 66–53	14–6 (7–2)	McKeon Pavilion (393); Moraga, CA
01/29/2015; 7:00 pm, LMUSN		at Loyola Marymount	W 56–49	15–6 (8–2)	Gersten Pavilion (290); Los Angeles, CA
01/31/2015; 12:00 pm, WavesCast		at Pepperdine	W 53–49	16–6 (9–2)	Firestone Fieldhouse (152); Malibu, CA
02/07/2015; 2:00 pm, TheW.tv		at Pacific	L 48–61	16–7 (9–3)	Alex G. Spanos Center (797); Stockton, CA
02/12/2015; 6:00 pm, TheW.tv		BYU	W 76–71 ^{OT}	17–7 (10–3)	McKeon Pavilion (295); Moraga, CA
02/14/2015; 1:00 pm, TheW.tv		San Diego	W 68–66	18–7 (11–3)	McKeon Pavilion (469); Moraga, CA
02/19/2015; 6:00 pm, TheW.tv		at Gonzaga	L 72–80	18–8 (11–4)	McCarthey Athletic Center (5,719); Spokane, WA
02/21/2015; 7:00 pm, Portland Portal		at Portland	W 62–58	19–8 (12–4)	Chiles Center (491); Portland, OR
02/26/2015; 6:00 pm, TheW.tv		San Francisco	L 63–65	19–9 (12–5)	McKeon Pavilion (355); Moraga, CA
02/28/2015; 1:00 pm, TheW.tv		Santa Clara	W 74–71	20–9 (13–5)	McKeon Pavilion (534); Moraga, CA
WCC Women's Tournament
03/05/2015; 8:00 pm, BYUtv		vs. BYU; Quarterfinals	L 64–65	20–10	Orleans Arena (7,110); Las Vegas, NV
WNIT
03/20/2015*; 6:00 pm		Hawaii; First Round	W 92–88 ^{OT}	21–10	McKeon Pavilion (279); Moraga, CA
03/23/2015*; 7:00 pm		Fresno State; Second Round	W 83–64	22–10	McKeon Pavilion (380); Moraga, CA
03/26/2015*; 7:00 pm		at Sacramento State; Third Round	W 77–69	23–10	Colberg Court (626); Sacramento, CA
03/29/2015*; 2:00 pm		at UCLA; Quarterfinals	L 66–82	23–11	Pauley Pavilion (746); Los Angeles, CA
*Non-conference game. ^{#}Rankings from AP Poll. (#) Tournament seedings in parentheses. All times are in Pacific Time.

== Rankings ==
+ Regular season polls	Poll	Pre- Season	Week 2	Week 3	Week 4	Week 5	Week 6	Week 7	Week 8	Week 9	Week 10	Week 11	Week 12	Week 13	Week 14	Week 15	Week 16	Week 17	Week 18	Week 19	Final
AP																					
Coaches																					

Legend
	Increase in ranking
	Decrease in ranking
	No change
(RV)	Received votes

== See also ==
- Saint Mary's Gaels women's basketball
- 2014–15 Saint Mary's Gaels men's basketball team
