= 2014–15 San Diego Toreros women's basketball team =

Intercollegiate basketball season

2014–15 San Diego Toreros women's basketball

WNIT, Second Round
- Conference: West Coast Conference
- Record: 25–7 (14–4 WCC)
- Head coach: Cindy Fisher (10th season)
- Assistant coaches: Mary Ann Falcosky; Niecee Nelson; Ashley Ford
- Home arena: Jenny Craig Pavilion

2014–15 West Coast Conference women's basketball standings
	Conf.				Overall
Team	W		L	PCT	W		L	PCT
Gonzaga	16	–	2	.889	26	–	8	.765
San Diego	14	–	4	.778	25	–	7	.781
Pacific	13	–	5	.722	21	–	10	.677
Saint Mary's	13	–	5	.722	23	–	11	.676
BYU †	12	–	6	.667	23	–	10	.697
San Francisco	8	–	10	.444	19	–	14	.576
Santa Clara	5	–	13	.278	11	–	18	.379
Loyola Marymount	4	–	14	.222	7	–	24	.226
Pepperdine	3	–	15	.167	8	–	22	.267
Portland	2	–	16	.111	4	–	26	.133
† Tournament winner As of March 29, 2015; Rankings from AP poll

The 2014–15 San Diego Toreros women's basketball team represented the University of San Diego in the 2014–15 college basketball season. The Toreros, members of the West Coast Conference, are led by head coach Cindy Fisher, in her tenth season at the school. The Toreros played their home games at the Jenny Craig Pavilion on the university campus in San Diego, California. They finished the season 25–7, 14–4 in WCC play to finish in second place. They advanced to semifinals the WCC women's tournament, where they lost to San Francisco. They were invited to the Women's National Invitation Tournament, where they defeated Long Beach State in the first round before losing to UCLA in the second round.

== Roster ==
2014–15 San Diego Toreros women's basketball team
Players
Coaches

Pos.	#	Name	Height	Year	Previous school	Hometown
G	1	Brooke Jelniker	6 ft 0 in (1.83 m)	RS Sr	ThunderRidge	Highlands Ranch, Colorado
F	2	Malina Hood	5 ft 10 in (1.78 m)	Jr	La Jolla Country Day	San Diego, California
G	3	Sophie Ederaine	5 ft 9 in (1.75 m)	Sr	Canyon Springs	Moreno Valley, California
G	5	Aubrey Ward-El	5 ft 9 in (1.75 m)	Fr	Skyview	Vancouver, Washington
F	11	Katelyn McDaniel	6 ft 1 in (1.85 m)	Sr	Highlands Ranch	Littleton, Colorado
F	12	Sophia Ederaine	6 ft 3 in (1.91 m)	Sr	Canyon Springs	Moreno Valley, California
F	21	Edi Utibe	6 ft 2 in (1.88 m)	RS Fr	Charlotte Amalie	Virgin Islands
F	22	Maya Hood	5 ft 10 in (1.78 m)	RS So	La Jolla Country Day	San Diego, California
F	24	Caroline Buhr	6 ft 1 in (1.85 m)	Fr	Penn	Mishawaka, Indiana
G	25	Katherine Hamilton	5 ft 8 in (1.73 m)	So	Dobson	Chandler, Arizona
G	32	Cori Woodward	5 ft 6 in (1.68 m)	Fr	Prairie	Vancouver, Washington
G	40	Jamie Kissinger	5 ft 9 in (1.75 m)	Fr	Minden	Minden, Nebraska
F	44	Sydney Williams	6 ft 1 in (1.85 m)	Fr	Coeur d'Alene	Coeur d'Alene, Idaho
F	55	Alexandria Young	6 ft 0 in (1.83 m)	Fr	Mater Dei	San Diego, California

Head coach

- Cindy Fisher (Eastern Wyoming College)

Assistant coach(es)

- Mary Ann Falcosky (Northern Arizona)
- Niecee Nelson (Concordia)
- Ashley Ford (Nebraska)

Legend

- (C) Team captain
- (S) Suspended
- (I) Ineligible
- (W) Walk-on
- Injured
- Current redshirt

Roster

== Schedule ==
Date time, TV	Rank^{#}	Opponent^{#}	Result	Record	Site (attendance) city, state
Exhibition
11/09/2014*; 2:00 pm, TheW.tv		San Diego Christian	W 110–71	–	Jenny Craig Pavilion (N/A); San Diego, California
Non-Conference regular season
11/15/2014*; 6:00 pm, TheW.tv		Cal State San Marcos	W 82–42	1–0	Jenny Craig Pavilion (325); San Diego, California
11/22/2014*; 6:00 pm, TheW.tv		Cal State Fullerton	W 60–54	2–0	Jenny Craig Pavilion (327); San Diego, California
11/22/2014*; 2:00 pm, Watch Big Sky		at Idaho	W 58–52	3–0	Memorial Gym (346); Moscow, Idaho
11/25/2014*; 6:00 pm, TheW.tv		Montana State	W 79–64	4–0	Jenny Craig Pavilion (426); San Diego, California
11/28/2014*; 6:00 pm, TheW.tv		Fresno State	L 88–93	4–1	Jenny Craig Pavilion (433); San Diego, California
12/01/2014*; 6:00 pm, TheW.tv		Dartmouth	W 78–53	5–1	Jenny Craig Pavilion (432); San Diego, California
12/06/2014*; 2:00 pm, Watch Big Sky		at Weber State	W 59–50	6–1	Dee Events Center (614); Ogden, Utah
12/09/2014*; 6:00 pm, TheW.tv		San Diego State	W 66–44	7–1	Jenny Craig Pavilion (963); San Diego, California
12/12/2014*; 7:00 pm		at Seattle	W 59–54	8–1	Connolly Center (153); Seattle, Washington
12/14/2014*; 4:00 pm, BigWest.tv		at UC Irvine	W 87–64	9–1	Bren Events Center (165); Irvine, California
WCC regular season
12/27/2014; 5:00 pm		at Portland	W 87–65	10–1 (1–0)	Chiles Center (445); Portland, Oregon
12/29/2014; 6:00 pm, TheW.tv		at Gonzaga	L 49–67	10–2 (1–1)	McCarthey Athletic Center (5,279); Spokane, Washington
01/01/2015; 6:00 pm, TheW.tv		San Francisco	W 56–55	11–2 (2–1)	Jenny Craig Pavilion (520); San Diego, California
01/03/2015; 2:00 pm, TheW.tv		Santa Clara	W 72–59	12–2 (3–1)	Jenny Craig Pavilion (414); San Diego, California
01/08/2015; 7:00 pm		at Pepperdine	W 68–64	13–2 (4–1)	Firestone Fieldhouse (217); Malibu, California
01/10/2015; 1:00 pm		at Loyola Marymount	W 67–59	14–2 (5–1)	Gersten Pavilion (320); Los Angeles, California
01/15/2015; 6:00 pm, TheW.tv		Saint Mary's	L 56–57	14–3 (5–2)	Jenny Craig Pavilion (590); San Diego, California
01/17/2015; 2:00 pm, TheW.tv		Pacific	W 56–52	15–3 (6–2)	Jenny Craig Pavilion (543); San Diego, California
01/24/2015; 1:00 pm, BYUtv		at BYU	L 50–54	15–4 (6–3)	Marriott Center (690); Provo, Utah
01/29/2015; 7:00 pm		at Santa Clara	W 64–61	16–4 (7–3)	Leavey Center (250); Santa Clara, California
01/31/2015; 2:00 pm, TheW.tv		at San Francisco, California	W 74–69	17–4 (8–3)	War Memorial Gymnasium (354); San Francisco
02/05/2015; 6:00 pm, TheW.tv		Loyola Marymount	W 68–49	18–4 (9–3)	Jenny Craig Pavilion (501); San Diego, California
02/07/2015; 2:00 pm, TheW.tv		Pepperdine	W 72–55	19–4 (10–3)	Jenny Craig Pavilion (466); San Diego, California
02/12/2015; 7:00 pm, TheW.tv		at Pacific	W 63–53	20–4 (11–3)	Alex G. Spanos Center (505); Stockton, California
02/14/2015; 1:00 pm, TheW.tv		at Saint Mary's	L 66–68	20–5 (11–4)	McKeon Pavilion (469); Moraga, California
02/21/2015; 2:00 pm, TheW.tv		BYU	W 69–59	21–5 (12–4)	Jenny Craig Pavilion (698); San Diego, California
02/26/2015; 6:00 pm, TheW.tv		Gonzaga	W 75–62	22–5 (13–4)	Jenny Craig Pavilion (633); San Diego, California
02/28/2015; 2:00 pm, TheW.tv		Portland	W 80–72	23–5 (14–4)	Jenny Craig Pavilion (769); San Diego, California
WCC Women's Tournament
03/06/2015; 2:00 pm, BYUtv		vs. Santa Clara; Quarterfinals	W 51–42	24–5	Orleans Arena (7,110); Paradise, Nevada
03/09/2015; 2:00 pm, BYUtv		vs. San Francisco; Semifinals	L 57–65	24–6	Orleans Arena (7,110); Paradise, Nevada
WNIT
03/19/2015*; 6:00 pm		Long Beach State; First Round	W 63–56	25–6	Jenny Craig Pavilion (677); San Diego, California
03/22/2015*; 2:00 pm		UCLA; Second Round	L 58–63	25–7	Jenny Craig Pavilion (467); San Diego, California
*Non-conference game. ^{#}Rankings from AP Poll. (#) Tournament seedings in parentheses. All times are in Pacific Time.
