= 2014–15 Loyola Marymount Lions women's basketball team =

Intercollegiate basketball season

2014–15 Loyola Marymount Lions women's basketball

DoubleTree LA Thanksgiving Classic Champions
- Conference: West Coast Conference
- Record: 7–24 (4–14 WCC)
- Head coach: Charity Elliott (3rd season)
- Assistant coaches: Alexis Mezzetta; Chris Elliott; Kiva Herman
- Home arena: Gersten Pavilion

2014–15 West Coast Conference women's basketball standings
	Conf.				Overall
Team	W		L	PCT	W		L	PCT
Gonzaga	16	–	2	.889	26	–	8	.765
San Diego	14	–	4	.778	25	–	7	.781
Pacific	13	–	5	.722	21	–	10	.677
Saint Mary's	13	–	5	.722	23	–	11	.676
BYU †	12	–	6	.667	23	–	10	.697
San Francisco	8	–	10	.444	19	–	14	.576
Santa Clara	5	–	13	.278	11	–	18	.379
Loyola Marymount	4	–	14	.222	7	–	24	.226
Pepperdine	3	–	15	.167	8	–	22	.267
Portland	2	–	16	.111	4	–	26	.133
† Tournament winner As of March 29, 2015; Rankings from AP poll

The 2014–15 Loyola Marymount Lions women's basketball team represented Loyola Marymount University in the 2014–15 college basketball season. The Lions, members of the West Coast Conference, are led by head coach Charity Elliott, in her third season at the school. The Lions play their home games at the Gersten Pavilion on the university campus in Los Angeles, California. They finished the season 7–24, 4–14 in WCC play to finish in eighth place. They advanced to the quarterfinals of the WCC women's tournament where they lost to Gonzaga.

== Roster ==
2014–15 Loyola Marymount Lions women's basketball team
Players
Coaches

Pos.	#	Name	Height	Year	Previous school	Hometown
G	2	Shelbi Aimonetti	5 ft 8 in (1.73 m)	Fr	St. Francis	Redwood City, CA
G	5	Chloe Hall	6 ft 0 in (1.83 m)	Fr	North Toronto Collegiate Institute	Toronto, Canada
G/F	10	Alyson Lock	5 ft 10 in (1.78 m)	Fr	Mark Keppel	Montebello, CA
F	12	Tamara Jovanovic	6 ft 3 in (1.91 m)	Fr	Third Belgrade	Belgrade, Serbia
G	13	Deanna Johnson	5 ft 7 in (1.7 m)	RS So	Norco	Corona, CA
F	15	Emily Ben-Jumbo	6 ft 1 in (1.85 m)	Jr	Tualatin	Tualatin, OR
G/F	20	Sophie Taylor	6 ft 0 in (1.83 m)	So	Acalanes	Lafayette, CA
G	21	Taylor Anderson	6 ft 0 in (1.83 m)	Jr	Bonita	La Verne, CA
G	22	Olivia Lucero	5 ft 8 in (1.73 m)	Fr	Highland	Gilbert, AZ
G	23	Leslie Lopez-Wood	5 ft 9 in (1.75 m)	Fr	Bishop Alemany	North Hollywood, CA
F	24	Bree Alford	6 ft 0 in (1.83 m)	Fr	Miramonte	Walnut Creek, CA
G	25	Deshka Olson	5 ft 8 in (1.73 m)	Fr	Salmon	Salmon, ID
F	30	NK Ilang	6 ft 0 in (1.83 m)	Fr	St. Anne's-Belfield	Ebonyi State, Nigeria
G	32	Makenzie Cast	5 ft 9 in (1.75 m)	Fr	Carondelet	Antioch, CA

Head coach

- Charity Elliott (Missouri State)

Assistant coach(es)

- Alexis Mezzetta (UC San Diego)
- Chris Elliott (Missouri State)
- Kiva Herman (San Diego)

Legend

- (C) Team captain
- (S) Suspended
- (I) Ineligible
- (W) Walk-on
- Injured
- Current redshirt

Roster

== Schedule ==
Date time, TV	Rank^{#}	Opponent^{#}	Result	Record	Site (attendance) city, state
Exhibition
11/03/2014*; 7:00 pm		Cal State Dominguez Hills	W 88–86	-	Gersten Pavilion (N/A); Los Angeles, CA
11/09/2014*; 3:00 pm		Bethesda (CA)	W 79–62	-	Gersten Pavilion (387); Los Angeles, CA
Regular Season
11/14/2014*; 9:00 am, OKSt.tv		at Oklahoma State	L 65–76	0–1	Gallagher-Iba Arena (5,546); Stillwater, OK
11/17/2014*; 5:00 pm, MW Network		at UNLV	L 76–91	0–2	Cox Pavilion (719); Las Vegas, NV
11/21/2014*; 7:00 pm, LMUSN		Cal Poly	L 79–87	0–3	Gersten Pavilion (543); Los Angeles, CA
11/28/2014*; 3:30 pm, LMUSN		UAB; DoubleTree LA Thanksgiving Classic	W 66–61	1–3	Gersten Pavilion (229); Los Angeles, CA
11/29/2014*; 3:30 pm, LMUSN		Bowling Green; DoubleTree LA Thanksgiving Classic	W 51–48	2–3	Gersten Pavilion (380); Los Angeles, CA
12/03/2014*; 4:00 pm, FCS Pacific		at Northern Arizona	L 64–82	2–4	Walkup Skydome (406); Flagstaff, AZ
12/06/2014*; 2:00 pm, WAC Digital		at Seattle	L 57–62	2–5	Connolly Center (149); Seattle, WA
12/13/2014*; 7:00 pm, LMUSN		UC Riverside	L 55–81	2–6	Gersten Pavilion (220); Los Angeles, CA
12/18/2014*; 4:00 pm, P12 Digital		at USC	L 54–96	2–7	Galen Center (313); Los Angeles, CA
12/20/2014*; 2:00 pm, LMUSN		Hawaiʻi	L 76–85	2–8	Gersten Pavilion (423); Los Angeles, CA
12/22/2014*; 2:00 pm, LMUSN		Washington State	L 60–87	2–9	Gersten Pavilion (308); Los Angeles, CA
12/29/2014; 1:00 pm, WavesCast		at Pepperdine	L 91–98 ^{OT}	2–10 (0–1)	Firestone Fieldhouse (212); Malibu, CA
01/01/2015; 7:00 pm, TheW.tv		at Pacific	L 69–89	2–11 (0–2)	Alex G. Spanos Center (430); Stockton, CA
01/03/2015; 1:00 pm, TheW.tv		at Saint Mary's	L 71–72	2–12 (0–3)	McKeon Pavilion (439); Moraga, CA
01/08/2015; 7:00 pm, LMUSN		BYU	L 63–71	2–13 (0–4)	Gersten Pavilion (875); Los Angeles, CA
01/10/2015; 2:00 pm, LMUSN		San Diego	L 59–67	2–14 (0–5)	Gersten Pavilion (320); Los Angeles, CA
01/15/2015; 7:00 pm, Portland Portal		at Portland	L 65–83	2–15 (0–6)	Chiles Center (297); Portland, OR
01/17/2015; 2:00 pm, TheW.tv		at Gonzaga	L 62–76	2–16 (0–7)	McCarthey Athletic Center (5,282); Spokane, WA
01/22/2015; 7:00 pm, LMUSN		Santa Clara	W 82–57	3–16 (1–7)	Gersten Pavilion (321); Los Angeles, CA
01/24/2015; 2:00 pm, LMUSN		San Francisco	L 65–74	3–17 (1–8)	Gersten Pavilion (421); Los Angeles, CA
01/29/2015; 7:00 pm, LMUSN		Saint Mary's	L 49–56	3–18 (1–9)	Gersten Pavilion (290); Los Angeles, CA
01/31/2015; 2:00 pm, LMUSN		Pacific	L 61–84	3–19 (1–10)	Gersten Pavilion (321); Los Angeles, CA
02/05/2015; 6:00 pm, TheW.tv		at San Diego	L 49–68	3–20 (1–11)	Jenny Craig Pavilion (501); San Diego, CA
02/07/2015; 1:00 pm, BYUtv		at BYU	L 59–74	3–21 (1–12)	Marriott Center (748); Provo, UT
02/12/2015; 7:00 pm, LMUSN		Gonzaga	L 59–82	3–22 (1–13)	Gersten Pavilion (338); Los Angeles, CA
02/14/2015; 2:00 pm, LMUSN		Portland	W 77–73	4–22 (2–13)	Gersten Pavilion (410); Los Angeles, CA
02/19/2015; 7:00 pm, TheW.tv		at San Francisco	L 75–87	4–23 (2–14)	War Memorial Gymnasium (334); San Francisco, CA
02/21/2015; 2:00 pm, Santa Clara Portal		at Santa Clara	W 75–63	5–23 (3–14)	Leavey Center (N/A); Santa Clara, CA
02/28/2015; 2:00 pm, LMUSN		Pepperdine	W 74–57	6–23 (4–14)	Gersten Pavilion (505); Los Angeles, CA
2015 WCC Tournament
03/05/2015; 12:00 pm, BYUtv		vs. Pepperdine; First Round	W 68–67	7–23	Orleans Arena (N/A); Las Vegas, NV
03/06/2015; 12:00 pm, BYUtv		vs. Gonzaga; Quarterfinals	L 50–70	7–24	Orleans Arena (7,110); Las Vegas, NV
*Non-conference game. ^{#}Rankings from AP Poll. (#) Tournament seedings in parentheses.

== Rankings ==
+ Regular season polls	Poll	Pre- Season	Week 1	Week 2	Week 3	Week 4	Week 5	Week 6	Week 7	Week 8	Week 9	Week 10	Week 11	Week 12	Week 13	Week 14	Week 15	Week 16	Week 17	Week 18	Final
AP																					
Coaches																					

Legend
	Increase in ranking
	Decrease in ranking
	No change
(RV)	Received votes
(NR)	Not ranked

== See also ==
- Loyola Marymount Lions women's basketball
