= Cindy Fisher (basketball) =

American college basketball coach

Biographical details
- Born: August 2, 1964 (age 62)

Coaching career (HC unless noted)
- 1989–1990: Mesa CC (asst.)
- 1990–1993: Illinois State (asst.)
- 1993–1994: Mesa CC (asst.)
- 1994–1995: Weber State (asst.)
- 1996–1998: Old Dominion (asst.)
- 1998–2003: Wyoming
- 2004–2005: Nebraska (asst.)
- 2005–2025: San Diego

Head coaching record
- Overall: 405–351 (.536)
- Tournaments: 0–1 (NCAA); 11–8 (WNIT)

Accomplishments and honors

Championships
- WCC tournament (2008)

Cindy Ann Fisher (born August 2, 1964) is an American college basketball coach who was the head coach of the San Diego Toreros women's basketball team at the University of San Diego (USD) from 2005 to 2025.

== Early Years (1994–1998) ==
She also served as an assistant coach at Weber State University and Old Dominion University.

== Wyoming Cowgirls (1998–2003) ==
Fisher led the Cowgirls for five years and finishing with a 59–81 record, where she led the Cowgirls to the WNIT Second Round in her final season as head coach.

== Nebraska Cornhuskers Assistant Coach (2003–2005) ==
Fisher was appointed to top assistant coach for the Nebraska Cornhuskers. She led Nebraska to back-to-back WNIT appearances in her two seasons there. In 2005, Nebraska won 103–99 against fifth ranked Baylor, the highest ranked opponent Nebraska defeated in team history.

== San Diego Toreros (2005–2025) ==
From 2005 to 2006, she orchestrated the largest turnaround in school history, implementing a 12-game improvement over the previous year.
In the 2007–08 season, Fisher led the Toreros to the NCAA tournament with an upset over the Gonzaga Bulldogs in the WCC championship game.
In addition to the NCAA tournament in 2008, Fisher led the Toreros to eight WNIT appearances.
In the 2019–20 season, Fisher turned the Toreros from a 2–16, tied for last place finish the season before to a 13–5 second-place finish. The team's performance led West Coast conference to award her Coach of the Year honors.
Fisher was let go from her head coaching position, following the 2024–25 season after 20 years at the helm.

== Head coaching record ==
Record table
Season	Team	Overall	Conference	Standing	Postseason
Wyoming Cowgirls (Western Athletic Conference) (1998–1999)
1998–99	Wyoming	7–19	3–11	7th (Mountain)	
Wyoming Cowgirls (Mountain West Conference) (1999–2003)
1999–00	Wyoming	10–18	4–10	6th	
2000–01	Wyoming	11–17	3–11	7th	
2001–02	Wyoming	13–15	5–9	6th	
2002–03	Wyoming	18–12	7–7	6th	WNIT Second Round
Wyoming:		59–81 (.421)	22–48 (.314)		
San Diego Toreros (West Coast Conference) (2005–2025)
2005–06	San Diego	9–19	4–10	7th	
2006–07	San Diego	21–9	10–4	2nd	WNIT First Round
2007–08	San Diego	19–13	7–7	T–3rd	NCAA First Round
2008–09	San Diego	19–13	7–7	T–4th	
2009–10	San Diego	15–14	7–7	T–4th	
2010–11	San Diego	17–14	5–9	T–7th	
2011–12	San Diego	26–9	12–4	T–2nd	WNIT Semifinals
2012–13	San Diego	22–10	13–4	T–2nd	WNIT Second Round
2013–14	San Diego	24–9	11–7	T-4th	WNIT Third Round
2014–15	San Diego	25–7	14–4	2nd	WNIT Second Round
2015–16	San Diego	25–8	13–5	T–3rd	WNIT Third Round
2016–17	San Diego	14–16	7–11	7th	
2017–18	San Diego	17–15	8–10	6th	
2018–19	San Diego	9–21	2–16	T–9th	
2019–20	San Diego	20–11	13–5	T-2nd	
2020–21	San Diego	12–7	9–5	3rd	
2021–22	San Diego	17–15	8–9	6th	WNIT Second Round
2022–23	San Diego	19–14	11–7	3rd	WNIT Super 16
2023–24	San Diego	9–22	4–12	8th	
2024–25	San Diego	7–24	2–18	11th	
San Diego:		346–256 (.575)	167–161 (.509)		
Total:		405–351 (.536)			
National champion Postseason invitational champion Conference regular season champion Conference regular season and conference tournament champion Division regular season champion Division regular season and conference tournament champion Conference tournament champion

== Awards and honors ==
- WCC Coach of the Year- 3 times (2007, 2012 & 2020)
