= 2014–15 Hawaii Rainbow Wahine basketball team =

Intercollegiate basketball season

2014–15 Hawaii Rainbow Wahine basketball

Big West Regular Season Champion

WNIT, First round
- Conference: Big West Conference
- Record: 23–9 (14–2 Big West)
- Head coach: Laura Beeman (3rd season)
- Assistant coaches: Mary Wooley (associate head coach, 3rd season); Dekita Williams (2nd season); Alex Delanian (1st season)
- Home arena: Stan Sheriff Center

2014–15 Big West women's basketball standings
	Conf.				Overall
Team	W		L	PCT	W		L	PCT
Hawai'i	14	–	2	.875	23	–	9	.719
Cal State Northridge†	11	–	5	.688	23	–	10	.697
Cal Poly	10	–	6	.625	15	–	13	.536
Long Beach State	9	–	7	.563	22	–	10	.688
UC Riverside	8	–	8	.500	17	–	13	.567
UC Davis	8	–	8	.500	13	–	15	.464
Cal State Fullerton	5	–	11	.313	11	–	18	.379
UC Irvine	5	–	11	.313	8	–	23	.258
UC Santa Barbara	2	–	14	.125	2	–	27	.069
† 2015 Big West tournament winner As of 29 June 2014; Rankings from AP poll

The 2014–15 Hawaii Rainbow Wahine women's basketball team represented the University of Hawaii at Manoa during the 2014–15 NCAA Division I women's basketball season. The Wahine, led by third-year head coach Laura Beeman, played their home games at the Stan Sheriff Center as members of the Big West Conference. They finished the season 23–9, including 14–2 in Big West play to finish in first place. Hawaii lost the Big West tournament final to Cal State Northridge. However, by winning a conference regular season title, Hawaii earned an automatic bid to the WNIT. Hawaii lost the first round of the WNIT to Saint Mary's.

== Previous season ==
The Wahine finished the 2014–15 season 23–9 (14–2 Big West), good for first place in the conference. After losing the championship round of the Big West tournament, Hawaii earned an automatic bid to the WNIT by virtue of winning its regular season conference title and lost in the first round.

== Roster ==
2014–15 Hawaii Rainbow Wahine women's basketball team
Players
Coaches

Pos.	#	Name	Height	Year	Previous school	Hometown
C	00	Brianna Kennedy (I)	6 ft 3 in (1.91 m)	RS So	Bonita HS; Loyola Marymount	La Verne, CA
G	3	Marissa Wimbley	5 ft 6 in (1.68 m)	Jr	Pleasant Grove HS	Elk Grove, CA
PG	4	Briana Harris	5 ft 6 in (1.68 m)	So	Saint Monica Catholic HS	Inglewood, CA
G	5	Sarah Toeaina	5 ft 11 in (1.8 m)	Fr	Kentwood HS	Covington, WA
F	12	Breana Jones	5 ft 10 in (1.78 m)	Fr	Maryknoll HS	Westport, New Zealand
G	15	Jasmine Redmon	5 ft 9 in (1.75 m)	Fr	Monterey Trail HS	Sacramento, CA
G	21	Shawna-Lei Kuehu	5 ft 10 in (1.78 m)	RS Sr	Punahou HS	Aiea, HI
G	22	Ashleigh Karaitiana	6 ft 0 in (1.83 m)	RS Jr	Endeavour Sports HS	Hamilton, New Zealand
F	24	Dalayna Sampton	6 ft 1 in (1.85 m)	Fr	Florin HS	Vallejo, CA
C	31	Megan Huff	6 ft 3 in (1.91 m)	Fr	Todd Beamer HS	Federal Way, WA
C	32	Shawlina Segovia	6 ft 1 in (1.85 m)	RS Sr	North HS; Mt. San Antonio CC	Riverside, CA
C	33	Connie Morris	6 ft 4 in (1.93 m)	Jr	Virgin Valley HS; Salt Lake CC	Mesquite, NV
G/F	34	Destiny King	5 ft 9 in (1.75 m)	Jr	Long Beach Poly HS	Long Beach, CA

Head coach

- Laura Beeman (Cal State San Bernardino)

Assistant coach(es)

- Mary Wooley (South Carolina–Aiken)
- Dekita Williams (Louisiana)
- Alex Delanian (USC)

Legend

- (C) Team captain
- (S) Suspended
- (I) Ineligible
- (W) Walk-on
- Injured
- Current redshirt

Roster
Last update: 2016-06-24

== Schedule ==
Date time, TV	Rank^{#}	Opponent^{#}	Result	Record	Site (attendance) city, state
Exhibition
10/29/2014*; 7:00 pm		Hawaii–Hilo	W 90–53		Stan Sheriff Center; Honolulu, HI
Non-conference regular season
11/14/2014*; 4:00 pm		Colorado State	W 63–58 ^{OT}	1–0	Moby Arena (1,179); Fort Collins, CO
11/16/2014*; 10:00 am		at Denver	W 60–58	2–0	Magness Arena (479); Denver, CO
11/21/2014*; 7:00 pm		California; Rainbow Wahine Classic	L 72–79	2–1	Stan Sheriff Center (1,828); Honolulu, HI
11/23/2014*; 7:00 pm		UNLV; Rainbow Wahine Classic	W 79–70	3–1	Stan Sheriff Center (1,638); Honolulu, HI
11/28/2014*; 4:30 pm		Prairie View A&M; Rainbow Wahine Shootout	W 72–59	4–1	Stan Sheriff Center (1,819); Honolulu, HI
11/29/2014*; 4:30 pm		No. 5 Stanford; Rainbow Wahine Shootout	L 73–86	4–2	Stan Sheriff Center (2,589); Honolulu, HI
11/30/2014*; 4:30 pm		No. 11 North Carolina; Rainbow Wahine Shootout	L 65–74	4–3	Stan Sheriff Center (1,983); Honolulu, HI
12/06/2014*; 7:00 pm		Pacific	L 61–69	4–4	Stan Sheriff Center (1,666); Honolulu, HI
12/13/2014*; 7:00 pm		BYU–Hawaii	W 92–40	5–4	Stan Sheriff Center (1,649); Honolulu, HI
12/20/2014*; 12:00 pm		at Loyola Marymount	W 85–76	6–4	Gersten Pavilion (423); Los Angeles, CA
12/23/2014*; 11:03 am		at Cal State Bakersfield	L 69–78	6–5	Icardo Center (750); Bakersfield, CA
12/31/2014*; 1:00 pm		Hawaii Pacific	W 76–68	7–5	Stan Sheriff Center (1,476); Honolulu, HI
01/02/2015*; 5:00 pm		UNC Greensboro	W 74–54	8–5	Stan Sheriff Center (1,633); Honolulu, HI
Big West regular season
01/08/2015; 5:05 pm		at Cal Poly	L 65–70	8–6 (0–1)	Mott Athletic Center (312); San Luis Obispo, CA
01/10/2015; 2:00 pm		at Cal State Northridge	L 46–53	8–7 (0–2)	Matadome (501); Northridge, CA
01/17/2015; 5:00 pm		UC Riverside	W 69–38	9–7 (1–2)	Stan Sheriff Center (1,834); Honolulu, HI
01/22/2015; 5:00 pm		at UC Davis	W 58–53	10–7 (2–2)	The Pavilion (521); Davis, CA
01/24/2015; 12:00 pm		at UC Irvine	W 85–50	11–7 (3–2)	Bren Events Center (343); Irvine, CA
01/29/2015; 7:00 pm		Long Beach State	W 72–64	12–7 (4–2)	Stan Sheriff Center (1,750); Honolulu, HI
01/31/2015; 5:00 pm		Cal State Northridge	W 64–49	13–7 (5–2)	Stan Sheriff Center (2,080); Honolulu, HI
02/05/2015; 7:00 pm		UC Santa Barbara	W 60–43	14–7 (6–2)	Stan Sheriff Center (1,605); Honolulu, HI
02/07/2015; 5:00 pm		Cal Poly	W 79–64	15–7 (7–2)	Stan Sheriff Center (2,141); Honolulu, HI
02/12/2016; 5:00 pm		at UC Riverside	W 72–69	16–7 (8–2)	UC Riverside Student Recreation Center (428); Riverside, CA
02/14/2015; 4:00 pm		at Cal State Fullerton	W 54–43	17–7 (9–2)	Titan Gym (263); Fullerton, CA
02/19/2015; 7:00 pm		UC Irvine	W 75–37	18–7 (10–2)	Stan Sheriff Center (1,876); Honolulu, HI
02/21/2015; 5:05 pm		UC Davis	W 62–60	19–7 (11–2)	Stan Sheriff Center (2,859); Honolulu, HI
02/26/2015; 5:00 pm		at Long Beach State	W 47–46	20–7 (12–2)	Walter Pyramid (831); Long Beach, CA
03/05/2015; 5:00 pm		at UC Santa Barbara	W 60–36	21–7 (13–2)	UC Santa Barbara Events Center (411); Santa Barbara, CA
03/07/2015; 5:05 pm		Cal State Fullerton	W 61–38	22–7 (14–2)	Stan Sheriff Center (4,340); Honolulu, HI
Big West tournament
03/13/2015; 10:00 am, ESPN3	(1)	vs. (7) Cal State Fullerton; Semifinal	W 73–64	23–7	Honda Center (1,048); Anaheim, CA
03/14/2015; 1:00 pm	(1)	vs. (2) Cal State Northridge; Final	L 60–67	23–8	Honda Center (1,415); Anaheim, CA
Women's National Invitation Tournament
03/20/2015*; 4:00 pm		at Saint Mary's; First round	L 88–92 ^{OT}	23–9	McKeon Pavilion (279); Moraga, CA
*Non-conference game. ^{#}Rankings from AP Poll. (#) Tournament seedings in parentheses. All times are in Hawaii–Aleutian Time.

== See also ==
- 2014–15 Hawaii Rainbow Warriors basketball team
