= 2014–15 Gonzaga Bulldogs women's basketball team =

Intercollegiate basketball season

2014–15 Gonzaga Bulldogs women's basketball

WCC Regular Season Champions

NCAA Women's Tournament, Sweet Sixteen
- Conference: West Coast Conference
- Record: 26–8 (16–2 WCC)
- Head coach: Lisa Fortier (1st season)
- Assistant coaches: Jordan Green; Stacy Clinesmith; Craig Fortier
- Home arena: McCarthey Athletic Center

2014–15 West Coast Conference women's basketball standings
	Conf.				Overall
Team	W		L	PCT	W		L	PCT
Gonzaga	16	–	2	.889	26	–	8	.765
San Diego	14	–	4	.778	25	–	7	.781
Pacific	13	–	5	.722	21	–	10	.677
Saint Mary's	13	–	5	.722	23	–	11	.676
BYU †	12	–	6	.667	23	–	10	.697
San Francisco	8	–	10	.444	19	–	14	.576
Santa Clara	5	–	13	.278	11	–	18	.379
Loyola Marymount	4	–	14	.222	7	–	24	.226
Pepperdine	3	–	15	.167	8	–	22	.267
Portland	2	–	16	.111	4	–	26	.133
† Tournament winner As of March 29, 2015; Rankings from AP poll

The 2014–15 Gonzaga Bulldogs women's basketball team represented Gonzaga University in the 2014–15 college basketball season. The Bulldogs (also informally referred to as the "Zags"), members of the West Coast Conference, were led by new head coach Lisa Fortier; she replaced Kelly Graves, who left to take the head coaching vacancy at Oregon. The Zags played their home games at the McCarthey Athletic Center on the university campus in Spokane, Washington. They finished the season 26-8, 12-4 in WCC play to win the WCC regular season title. They advanced to the semifinals to WCC women's tournament, where they lost to BYU. They received at-large bid to the NCAA women's basketball tournament, where they upset George Washington in the first round, Oregon State in the second round, before losing to Tennessee in the Sweet Sixteen to end their Cinderella run.

== Roster ==
2014–15 Gonzaga Bulldogs women's basketball team
Players
Coaches

Pos.	#	Name	Height	Year	Previous school	Hometown
G/F	1	Chelsea Waters	6 ft 1 in (1.85 m)	Jr	Lewiston	Lewiston, ID
G	3	Kacie Bosch	5 ft 9 in (1.75 m)	Fr	Chinook	Lethbridge, AB
G	5	Georgia Stirton	5 ft 8 in (1.73 m)	Jr	Waverly Falcons; College of Southern Idaho	Melbourne, Australia
G	11	Laura Sullivan	5 ft 4 in (1.63 m)	Sr	Holy Names Academy	Seattle, WA
C	12	Emma Wolfram	6 ft 5 in (1.96 m)	RS Fr	South Kamloops	Kamloops, BC
F	13	Jill Barta	6 ft 3 in (1.91 m)	Fr	Fairfield	Fairfield, MT
F	14	Sunny Greinacher	6 ft 4 in (1.93 m)	Sr	Grashof Gymnasium	Essen, Germany
F	22	Shaniqua Nilles	6 ft 0 in (1.83 m)	RS Jr	West Valley	Spokane, WA
F	23	Kiara Kudron	6 ft 2 in (1.88 m)	Jr	Huron	New Boston, MI
G	24	Keani Albanez	5 ft 10 in (1.78 m)	Sr	Buena	Santa Barbara, CA
G	31	Elle Tinkle	6 ft 2 in (1.88 m)	Jr	Big Sky	Missoula, MT
G	33	Lindsay Sherbert	6 ft 0 in (1.83 m)	Sr	Great Oak; California	Temecula, CA
G	42	Emma Stach	5 ft 9 in (1.75 m)	Fr	Avides Hurricanes	Buchholz, Germany
C	44	Shelby Cheslek	6 ft 5 in (1.96 m)	RS Jr	Pullman	Pullman, WA

Head coach

- Lisa Mispley Fortier (Cal State Monterey)

Assistant coach(es)

- Jordan Green (George Fox)
- Stacy Clinesmith (UC Santa Barbara)
- Craig Fortier (Cal State Monterey)

Legend

- (C) Team captain
- (S) Suspended
- (I) Ineligible
- (W) Walk-on
- Injured
- Current redshirt

Roster
Last update: 2014-11-25

== Schedule ==
Date time, TV	Rank^{#}	Opponent^{#}	Result	Record	Site (attendance) city, state
Exhibition
11/02/2014*; 2:00 pm		Eastern Oregon	W 92–44	–	McCarthey Athletic Center (4,765); Spokane, WA
Non-conference regular season
11/16/2014*; 2:00 pm, SWX		No. 22 Dayton	W 75–65	1–0	McCarthey Athletic Center (5,442); Spokane, WA
11/18/2014*; 6:00 pm, TheW.tv	No. 24	Idaho State	W 88–63	2–0	McCarthey Athletic Center (4,541); Spokane, WA
11/21/2014*; 6:00 pm, Watch Big Sky	No. 24	at Montana State	W 89–60	3–0	Worthington Arena (1,517); Bozeman, MT
11/28/2014*; 3:30 pm		vs. American; South Point Shootout	L 56–59	3–1	South Point Arena (N/A); Las Vegas, NV
11/29/2014*; 3:30 pm		vs. No. 17 Iowa; South Point Shootout	L 67–79	3–2	South Point Arena (177); Las Vegas, NV
12/03/2014*; 6:00 pm, SWX		at Eastern Washington	W 61–60	4–2	Reese Court (1,877); Cheney, WA
12/07/2014*; 2:00 pm, TheW.tv		Portland State	W 73–41	5–2	McCarthey Athletic Center (5,204); Spokane, WA
12/09/2014*; 6:00 pm, SWX		Washington State	L 58–59	5–3	McCarthey Athletic Center (5,363); Spokane, WA
12/12/2014*; 6:00 pm, MW Net		at Wyoming	W 70–56	6–3	Arena-Auditorium (3,620); Laramie, WY
12/15/2014*; 10:00 am		at Northwestern	L 43–62	6–4	Welsh-Ryan Arena (5,047); Evanston, IL
12/20/2014*; 2:00 pm, TheW.tv		Southern Utah	W 70–51	7–4	McCarthey Athletic Center (5,251); Spokane, WA
WCC regular season
12/27/2014; 2:00 pm, SWX		BYU	W 78–62	8–4 (1–0)	McCarthey Athletic Center (5,911); Spokane, WA
12/29/2014; 6:00 pm, TheW.tv		San Diego	W 67–49	9–4 (2–0)	McCarthey Athletic Center (5,279); Spokane, WA
01/03/2015; 2:00 pm, TheW.tv		Portland	W 79–57	10–4 (3–0)	McCarthey Athletic Center (5,072); Spokane, WA
01/08/2015; 7:00 pm, TheW.tv		at San Francisco	W 75–64	11–4 (4–0)	War Memorial Gymnasium (257); San Francisco, CA
01/10/2015; 2:00 pm		at Santa Clara	W 78–70	12–4 (5–0)	Leavey Center (371); Santa Clara, CA
01/15/2015; 6:00 pm, TheW.tv		Pepperdine	W 73–64	13–4 (6–0)	McCarthey Athletic Center (4,981); Spokane, WA
01/17/2015; 2:00 pm, SWX		Loyola Marymount	W 76–62	14–4 (7–0)	McCarthey Athletic Center (5,282); Spokane, WA
01/22/2015; 6:00 pm, TheW.tv		at Saint Mary's	W 52–42	15–4 (8–0)	McKeon Pavilion (603); Moraga, CA
01/24/2015; 2:00 pm, TheW.tv		at Pacific	W 73–63	16–4 (9–0)	Alex G. Spanos Center (673); Stockton, CA
01/31/2015; 2:00 pm		at Portland	W 85–63	17–4 (10–0)	Chiles Center (773); Portland, OR
02/05/2015; 6:00 pm, TheW.tv		Santa Clara	W 76–49	18–4 (11–0)	McCarthey Athletic Center (5,082); Spokane, WA
02/07/2015; 2:00 pm, TheW.tv		San Francisco	W 91–84 ^{4OT}	19–4 (12–0)	McCarthey Athletic Center (6,000); Spokane, WA
02/12/2015; 7:00 pm		at Loyola Marymount	W 82–59	20–4 (13–0)	Gersten Pavilion (338); Los Angeles, CA
02/14/2015; 12:00 pm		at Pepperdine	W 78–56	21–4 (14–0)	Firestone Fieldhouse (246); Malibu, CA
02/19/2015; 6:00 pm, SWX		Saint Mary's	W 80–72	22–4 (15–0)	McCarthey Athletic Center (5,719); Spokane, WA
02/21/2015; 2:00 pm, TheW.tv		Pacific	L 59–71	22–5 (15–1)	McCarthey Athletic Center (6,000); Spokane, WA
02/26/2015; 6:00 pm, TheW.tv		at San Diego	L 62–75	22–6 (15–2)	Jenny Craig Pavilion (633); San Diego, CA
02/28/2015; 1:00 pm, BYUtv		at BYU	W 73–66	23–6 (16–2)	Marriott Center (1,226); Provo, UT
WCC Women's Tournament
03/06/2015; 12:00 pm, BYUtv		vs. Loyola Marymount; Quarterfinals	W 70–50	24–6	Orleans Arena (7,110); Las Vegas, NV
03/09/2015; 12:00 pm, BYUtv		vs. BYU; Semifinals	L 55–61	24–7	Orleans Arena (N/A); Las Vegas, NV
NCAA tournament
03/20/2015*; 4:30 pm, ESPN2		vs. No. 19 George Washington; First Round	W 82–69	25–7	Gill Coliseum (3,728); Corvallis, OR
03/22/2015*; 4:00 pm, ESPN2		at No. 10 Oregon State; Second Round	W 76–64	26–7	Gill Coliseum (5,071); Corvallis, OR
03/28/2015*; 4:00 pm, ESPN		vs. No. 6 Tennessee; Sweet Sixteen	L 69–73 ^{OT}	26–8	Spokane Arena (8,686); Spokane, WA
*Non-conference game. ^{#}Rankings from AP Poll. (#) Tournament seedings in parentheses. All times are in Pacific Time.

== Rankings ==
2014–15 NCAA Division I women's basketball rankings

Regular season polls
Poll	Pre- Season	Week 2	Week 3	Week 4	Week 5	Week 6	Week 7	Week 8	Week 9	Week 10	Week 11	Week 12	Week 13	Week 14	Week 15	Week 16	Week 17	Week 18	Final
AP	RV	24	NR	NR	NR	NR	NR	NR	NR	NR	NR	NR	RV	RV	RV	RV	NR	NR	NR
Coaches	RV	RV	RV	NR	NR	NR	NR	NR	NR	NR	RV	RV	RV	RV	RV	RV	NR	NR	NR

Legend
	Increase in ranking
	Decrease in ranking
	Not ranked previous week
(RV)	Received Votes

== See also ==
- 2014–15 Gonzaga Bulldogs men's basketball team
- Gonzaga Bulldogs women's basketball
