= 2014–15 San Francisco Dons women's basketball team =

Intercollegiate basketball season

2014–15 San Francisco Dons women's basketball
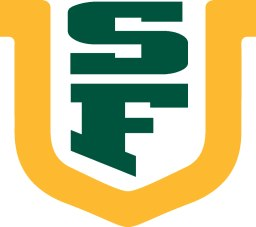

WNIT, First Round
- Conference: West Coast Conference
- Record: 19–14 (8–10 WCC)
- Head coach: Jennifer Azzi (5th season)
- Assistant coaches: Blair Hardiek; Shanele Stires; Britinee Yasukochi
- Home arena: War Memorial Gymnasium

2014–15 West Coast Conference women's basketball standings
	Conf.				Overall
Team	W		L	PCT	W		L	PCT
Gonzaga	16	–	2	.889	26	–	8	.765
San Diego	14	–	4	.778	25	–	7	.781
Pacific	13	–	5	.722	21	–	10	.677
Saint Mary's	13	–	5	.722	23	–	11	.676
BYU †	12	–	6	.667	23	–	10	.697
San Francisco	8	–	10	.444	19	–	14	.576
Santa Clara	5	–	13	.278	11	–	18	.379
Loyola Marymount	4	–	14	.222	7	–	24	.226
Pepperdine	3	–	15	.167	8	–	22	.267
Portland	2	–	16	.111	4	–	26	.133
† Tournament winner As of March 29, 2015; Rankings from AP poll

The 2014–15 San Francisco Dons women's basketball team represented the University of San Francisco in the 2014–15 college basketball season. It was head coach Jennifer Azzi's fifth season at San Francisco. The Dons, members of the West Coast Conference, played their home games at War Memorial Gymnasium. They finished the season 19–14, 8–10 in WCC play to finish in sixth place. They advanced to the championship of the WCC women's tournament, where they lost to BYU. They were invited to the Women's National Invitation Tournament, where they lost in the first round to Fresno State.

== Roster ==
2014–15 San Francisco Dons women's basketball team
Players
Coaches

Pos.	#	Name	Height	Year	Previous school	Hometown
G	1	Zhane Dykes	5 ft 9 in (1.75 m)	Jr	Bishop Gorman	Las Vegas, NV
G	2	Taj Winston	5 ft 10 in (1.78 m)	Sr	Long Beach Poly	Long Beach, CA
F	3	Paige Spietz	6 ft 3 in (1.91 m)	RS Sr	Missouri	Brimfield, IL
G	4	Tiara Tucker	5 ft 3 in (1.6 m)	Fr	McNair	Stockton, CA
G	5	Aundrea Gordon	5 ft 7 in (1.7 m)	Sr	McKinney	McKinney, TX
G	11	Rachel Howard	5 ft 10 in (1.78 m)	So	Berkeley	Berkeley, CA
F	12	Byrn Stark	6 ft 0 in (1.83 m)	RS So	Bishops' School	La Jolla, CA
F	14	Michaela Rakova	6 ft 3 in (1.91 m)	Fr	Gymnazium Hubeneho	Ivanka pri Dunaji, Slovakia
G	21	Anna Seilund	5 ft 9 in (1.75 m)	Fr	Falkonergaarden	Copenhagen, Denmark
F	22	Claudia Price	5 ft 11 in (1.8 m)	So	West Mesquite	Mesquite, TX
G	23	Chelsey Jacox	5 ft 7 in (1.7 m)	RS Jr	North Iowa Area CC	Minneapolis, MN
F	25	Alicia Scafidi	6 ft 1 in (1.85 m)	RS Jr	Sam Barlow	Gresham, OR
F	32	Taylor Proctor	6 ft 0 in (1.83 m)	Jr	Sand Creek	Colorado Springs, CO
G	35	Kalyn Simon	5 ft 9 in (1.75 m)	RS Fr	Archbishop Mitty	San Jose, CA
F	44	Hashima Carothers	5 ft 11 in (1.8 m)	So	Eastside College Prep	Las Vegas, NV

Head coach

- Jennifer Azzi (Stanford)

Assistant coach(es)

- Blair Hardiek (Missouri)
- Shanele Stires (Kansas State)
- Britinee Yasukochi (Occidental)

Legend

- (C) Team captain
- (S) Suspended
- (I) Ineligible
- (W) Walk-on
- Injured
- Current redshirt

Roster

== Schedule and results ==
Date time, TV	Rank^{#}	Opponent^{#}	Result	Record	Site (attendance) city, state
Exhibition Season
11/08/2014*; 2:00 pm		St. Thomas	W 87–69	–	War Memorial Gymnasium (199); San Francisco, CA
Regular Season
11/14/2014*; 7:00 pm, TheW.tv		Columbia	W 70–65	1–0	War Memorial Gymnasium (422); San Francisco, CA
11/16/2014*; 2:00 pm, TheW.tv		Sonoma State	W 83–42	2–0	War Memorial Gymnasium (450); San Francisco, CA
11/18/2014*; 7:00 pm, TheW.tv		Cal State Monterey Bay	W 85–48	3–0	War Memorial Gymnasium (203); San Francisco, CA
11/22/2014*; 2:00 pm, BigWest.tv		at UC Riverside	L 53–66	3–1	UC Riverside Student Recreation Center (209); Riverside, CA
11/25/2014*; 7:30 pm, TheW.tv		Nevada	W 63–48	4–1	War Memorial Gymnasium (622); San Francisco, CA
11/29/2014*; 2:00 pm, TheW.tv		Utah Valley	W 69–50	5–1	War Memorial Gymnasium (266); San Francisco, CA
12/02/2014*; 7:00 pm, BigWest.tv		at UC Davis	W 73–70	6–1	The Pavilion (365); Davis, CA
12/07/2014*; 2:00 pm, BigWest.tv		at Long Beach State	L 58–70	6–2	Walter Pyramid (676); Long Beach, CA
12/14/2014*; 2:00 pm, WAC Digital Net		at Seattle	W 67–56	7–2	Connolly Center (175); Seattle, WA
12/17/2014*; 7:00 pm, TheW.tv		North Texas	W 60–42	8–2	War Memorial Gymnasium (157); San Francisco, CA
12/20/2014*; 2:00 pm, TheW.tv		San Jose State	W 77–62	9–2	War Memorial Gymnasium (306); San Francisco, CA
12/27/2014; 2:00 pm, TheW.tv		Pacific	L 54–92	9–3 (0–1)	War Memorial Gymnasium (311); San Francisco, CA
12/29/2014; 7:00 pm, TheW.tv		Saint Mary's	L 66–68	9–4 (0–2)	War Memorial Gymnasium (244); San Francisco, CA
01/01/2015; 6:00 pm, TheW.tv		at San Diego	L 55–56	9–5 (0–3)	Jenny Craig Pavilion (520); San Diego, CA
01/03/2015; 1:00 pm, BYUtv		at BYU	L 62–65	9–6 (0–4)	Marriott Center (622); Provo, UT
01/08/2015; 7:00 pm, TheW.tv		Gonzaga	L 64–75	9–7 (0–5)	War Memorial Gymnasium (257); San Francisco, CA
01/10/2015; 2:00 pm, TheW.tv		Portland	W 85–68	10–7 (1–5)	War Memorial Gymnasium (269); San Francisco, CA
01/17/2015; 2:00 pm, TheW.tv		Santa Clara	W 62–45	11–7 (2–5)	War Memorial Gymnasium (348); San Francisco, CA
01/22/2015; 7:00 pm, WavesCast		at Pepperdine	W 69–58	12–7 (3–5)	Firestone Fieldhouse (203); Malibu, CA
01/24/2015; 2:00 pm, LMUSN		at Loyola Marymount	W 74–65	13–7 (4–5)	Gersten Pavilion (421); Los Angeles, CA
01/29/2015; 7:00 pm, TheW.tv		BYU	L 63–68	13–8 (4–6)	War Memorial Gymnasium (221); San Francisco, CA
01/31/2015; 2:00 pm, TheW.tv		San Diego	L 69–74	13–9 (4–7)	War Memorial Gymnasium (354); San Francisco, CA
02/05/2015; 7:00 pm, Portland Portal		at Portland	W 79–44	14–9 (5–7)	Chiles Center (296); Portland, OR
02/07/2015; 2:00 pm, TheW.tv		at Gonzaga	L 84–91 ^{4OT}	14–10 (5–8)	McCarthey Athletic Center (6,000); Spokane, WA
02/14/2015; 2:00 pm, Santa Clara Portal		at Santa Clara	L 79–80 ^{OT}	14–11 (5–9)	Leavey Center (N/A); Santa Clara, CA
02/19/2015; 7:00 pm, TheW.tv		Loyola Marymount	W 87–75	15–11 (6–9)	War Memorial Gymnasium (334); San Francisco, CA
02/21/2015; 2:00 pm, TheW.tv		Pepperdine	L 65–76	15–12 (6–10)	War Memorial Gymnasium (418); San Francisco, CA
02/26/2015; 6:00 pm, TheW.tv		at Saint Mary's	W 65–63	16–12 (7–10)	McKeon Pavilion (355); Moraga, CA
02/28/2015; 2:00 pm, TheW.tv		at Pacific	W 91–79	17–12 (8–10)	Alex G. Spanos Center (805); Stockton, CA
2015 WCC Tournament
03/05/2015; 6:00 pm, BYUtv		vs. Pacific; Quarterfinals	W 74–64	18–12	Orleans Arena (N/A); Las Vegas, NV
03/09/2015; 2:00 pm, BYUtv		vs. San Diego; Semifinals	W 65–57	19–12	Orleans Arena (7,110); Las Vegas, NV
03/10/2015; 1:00 pm, ESPNU		vs. BYU; Championship Game	L 65–76	19–13	Orleans Arena (8,000); Las Vegas, NV
WNIT
03/19/2015*; 7:00 pm		at Fresno State; First Round	L 73–79	19–14	Save Mart Center (1,354); Fresno, CA
*Non-conference game. ^{#}Rankings from AP Poll. (#) Tournament seedings in parentheses. All times are in Pacific Time.

== Rankings ==
+ Regular season polls	Poll	Pre- Season	Week 1	Week 2	Week 3	Week 4	Week 5	Week 6	Week 7	Week 8	Week 9	Week 10	Week 11	Week 12	Week 13	Week 14	Week 15	Week 16	Week 17	Week 18	Final
AP																					
Coaches																					

Legend
	Increase in ranking
	Decrease in ranking
	No change
(RV)	Received votes
(NR)	Not ranked

== See also ==
- 2014–15 San Francisco Dons men's basketball team
- San Francisco Dons women's basketball
