= 2014–15 Portland Pilots women's basketball team =

Intercollegiate basketball season

2014–15 Portland Pilots women's basketball
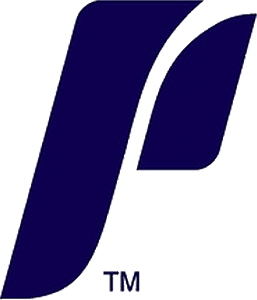
- Conference: West Coast Conference
- Record: 4–26 (2–16 WCC)
- Head coach: Cheryl Sorenson (1st season)
- Assistant coaches: Steve Lowe; Brianna Chambers; Megan Osmer
- Home arena: Chiles Center

2014–15 West Coast Conference women's basketball standings
	Conf.				Overall
Team	W		L	PCT	W		L	PCT
Gonzaga	16	–	2	.889	26	–	8	.765
San Diego	14	–	4	.778	25	–	7	.781
Pacific	13	–	5	.722	21	–	10	.677
Saint Mary's	13	–	5	.722	23	–	11	.676
BYU †	12	–	6	.667	23	–	10	.697
San Francisco	8	–	10	.444	19	–	14	.576
Santa Clara	5	–	13	.278	11	–	18	.379
Loyola Marymount	4	–	14	.222	7	–	24	.226
Pepperdine	3	–	15	.167	8	–	22	.267
Portland	2	–	16	.111	4	–	26	.133
† Tournament winner As of March 29, 2015; Rankings from AP poll

The 2014–15 Portland Pilots women's basketball team represented the University of Portland in the 2014–15 college basketball season. It was head coach Cheryl Sorensen's first season as head coach at Portland. The Pilots were members of the West Coast Conference and played their home games at the Chiles Center. They finished the season 4–26, 2–16 in WCC play to finish in last place. They lost in the first round of the WCC women's tournament to Santa Clara.

== 2014–15 Roster ==
2014–15 Portland Pilots women's basketball team
Players
Coaches

Pos.	#	Name	Height	Year	Previous school	Hometown
G	3	Kaylie Van Loo	5 ft 9 in (1.75 m)	So	Glencoe HS	Hillsboro, Ore.
G	10	Colleen Olinger	5 ft 8 in (1.73 m)	Sr	Academy of Notre Dame de Namur	Springfield, Pa.
F	11	Sara Ines Hernandez	6 ft 1 in (1.85 m)	Jr	Liceo Scientifico Nomentano	Rome, Italy
G	14	Alison Ryan	5 ft 10 in (1.78 m)	RS So	Ponderosa HS	Cameron Park, Calif.
G	15	Madison Ward	5 ft 10 in (1.78 m)	RS Fr	Mullen HS	Golden, Colo.
G	20	Hannah Mattson	5 ft 9 in (1.75 m)	So	West Valley HS	Fairbanks, Alaska
G/F	22	Cassandra Brown	6 ft 2 in (1.88 m)	RS Sr	Clarence Fulton	Vernon, B.C.
G	23	Kari Luttinen	5 ft 10 in (1.78 m)	Sr	Seattle Prep	Seattle, Wash.
G	24	Stefania Sideri	5 ft 9 in (1.75 m)	RS Fr	Ano Liosia HS	Athens, Greece
F	30	Cassandra Thompson	6 ft 2 in (1.88 m)	Sr	Timberlake HS	Spirit Lake, Idaho
G	32	Jasmine Wooton	5 ft 8 in (1.73 m)	Sr	Chatsworth HS	Northridge, Calif.
F	33	Ashley Gray	6 ft 1 in (1.85 m)	Fr	West Valley HS	Yakima, Wash.
C	35	Sara Zaragoza	6 ft 4 in (1.93 m)	Fr	Instituto Veritas	Madrid, Spain

Head coach

- Cheryl Sorenson (Washington)

Assistant coach(es)

- Steve Lowe (Central Washington)
- Brianna Chambers (Cal State Bakersfield)
- Jazmine Foreman (Lynn)

Legend

- (C) Team captain
- (S) Suspended
- (I) Ineligible
- (W) Walk-on
- Injured
- Current redshirt

Roster

== Schedule and results ==
Date time, TV	Rank^{#}	Opponent^{#}	Result	Record	Site (attendance) city, state
Exhibition
11/05/2014*; 7:00 pm		Western Oregon	W 70–60	-	Chiles Center (292); Portland, OR
11/11/2014*; 7:00 pm		Concordia	W 83–46	-	Chiles Center (267); Portland, OR
Regular Season
11/14/2014*; 4:00 pm, P12 Digital		at No. 20 Oregon State	L 65–87	0–1	Gill Coliseum (2,024); Corvallis, OR
11/21/2014*; 7:00 pm, BigWest.tv		at Cal State Northridge	L 41–45	0–2	Matadome (486); Northridge, CA
11/23/2014*; 1:00 pm, BigWest.tv		at Cal Poly	L 67–76	0–3	Mott Gym (687); San Luis Obispo, CA
11/28/2014*; 4:00 pm, MW Net		at Nevada; Nugget Classic	L 59–84	0–4	Lawlor Events Center (1,131); Reno, NV
11/29/2014*; 2:00 pm, MW Net		vs. Utah; Nugget Classic	W 58–50	1–4	Lawlor Events Center (368); Reno, NV
12/05/2014*; 7:00 pm, Portland Portal		Oregon	L 49–72	1–5	Chiles Center (313); Portland, OR
12/07/2014*; 2:00 pm, Portland Portal		Washington	L 45–80	1–6	Chiles Center (341); Portland, OR
12/12/2014*; 7:00 pm, Portland Portal		Portland State	W 91–63	2–6	Chiles Center (288); Portland, OR
12/14/2014*; 2:00 pm, Portland Portal		Montana	L 55–69	2–7	Chiles Center (269); Portland, OR
12/17/2014*; 6:00 pm, Watch Big Sky		at Eastern Washington	L 65–72	2–8	Reese Court (461); Cheney, WA
12/21/2014*; 1:00 pm, MW Network		at Boise State	L 58–94	2–9	Taco Bell Arena (533); Boise, ID
12/27/2014; 5:00 pm, Portland Portal		San Diego	L 65–87	2–10 (0–1)	Chiles Center (445); Portland, OR
12/29/2014; 7:00 pm, Portland Portal		BYU	L 79–83	2–11 (0–2)	Chiles Center (339); Portland, OR
01/03/2015; 2:00 pm, TheW.tv		at Gonzaga	L 57–79	2–12 (0–3)	McCarthey Athletic Center (5,072); Spokane, WA
01/08/2015; 7:00 pm, Santa Clara Portal		at Santa Clara	L 68–83	2–13 (0–4)	Leavey Center (365); Santa Clara, CA
01/10/2015; 2:00 pm, TheW.tv		at San Francisco	L 68–85	2–14 (0–5)	War Memorial Gymnasium (269); San Francisco, CA
01/15/2015; 7:00 pm, Portland Portal		Loyola Marymount	W 83–65	3–14 (1–5)	Chiles Center (297); Portland, OR
01/17/2015; 2:00 pm, Portland Portal		Pepperdine	W 80–61	4–14 (2–5)	Chiles Center (247); Portland, OR
01/22/2015; 7:00 pm, TheW.tv		at Pacific	L 69–72	4–15 (2–6)	Alex G. Spanos Center (491); Stockton, CA
01/24/2015; 2:00 pm, TheW.tv		at Saint Mary's	L 53–66	4–16 (2–7)	McKeon Pavilion (393); Moraga, CA
01/31/2015; 2:00 pm, Portland Portal		Gonzaga	L 63–85	4–17 (2–8)	Chiles Center (473); Portland, OR
02/05/2015; 7:00 pm, Portland Portal		San Francisco	L 44–79	4–18 (2–9)	Chiles Center (296); Portland, OR
02/07/2015; 2:00 pm, Portland Portal		Santa Clara	L 55–64	4–19 (2–10)	Chiles Center (390); Portland, OR
02/12/2015; 7:00 pm, WavesCast		at Pepperdine	L 72–76	4–20 (2–11)	Firestone Fieldhouse (202); Malibu, CA
02/14/2015; 2:00 pm, LMUSN		at Loyola Marymount	L 73–77	4–21 (2–12)	Gersten Pavilion (410); Los Angeles, CA
02/19/2015; 7:00 pm, Portland Portal		Pacific	L 78–80	4–22 (2–13)	Chiles Center (331); Portland, OR
02/21/2015; 7:00 pm, Portland Portal		Saint Mary's	L 58–62	4–23 (2–14)	Chiles Center (491); Portland, OR
02/26/2015; 6:00 pm, BYUtv		at BYU	L 63–65	4–24 (2–15)	Marriott Center (858); Provo, UT
02/28/2015; 2:00 pm, TheW.tv		at San Diego	L 72–80	4–25 (2–16)	Jenny Craig Pavilion (769); San Diego, CA
2015 WCC Tournament
03/05/2015; 2:00 pm, BYUtv		vs. Santa Clara; First Round	L 58–66	4–26	Orleans Arena (N/A); Las Vegas, NV
*Non-conference game. ^{#}Rankings from AP Poll. (#) Tournament seedings in parentheses. All times are in Pacific Time.

== Rankings ==
+ Regular season polls	Poll	Pre- Season	Week 1	Week 2	Week 3	Week 4	Week 5	Week 6	Week 7	Week 8	Week 9	Week 10	Week 11	Week 12	Week 13	Week 14	Week 15	Week 16	Week 17	Week 18	Final
AP																					
Coaches																					

Legend
	Increase in ranking
	Decrease in ranking
	No change
(RV)	Received votes
(NR)	Not ranked

== See also ==
- 2014–15 Portland Pilots men's basketball team
- Portland Pilots women's basketball
