= 2014–15 Pepperdine Waves women's basketball team =

Intercollegiate basketball season

2014–15 Pepperdine Waves women's basketball
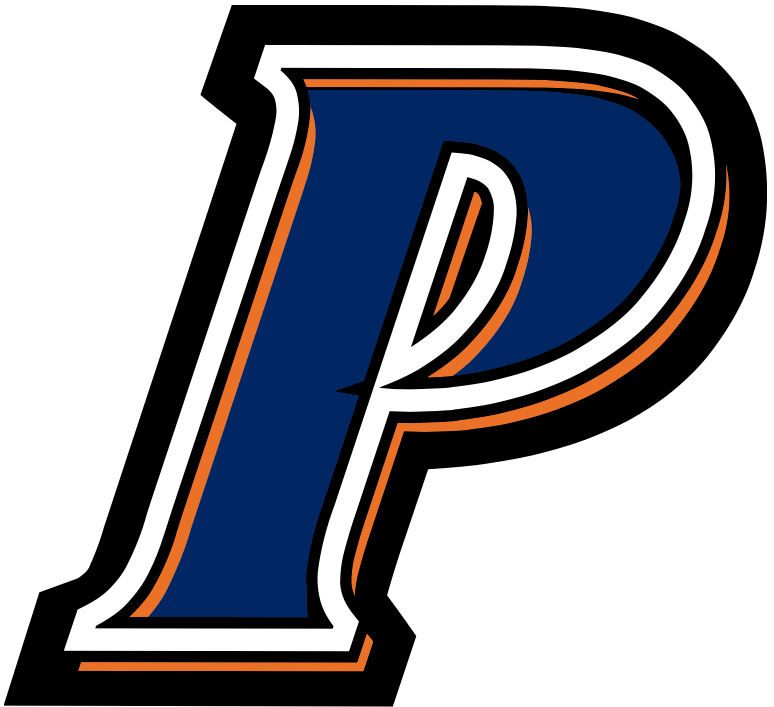
- Conference: West Coast Conference
- Record: 8–22 (3–15 WCC)
- Head coach: Ryan Weisenberg (2nd season)
- Assistant coaches: Trisha Raniewicz; Mallorie Winn; Jordan Adams-Smith
- Home arena: Firestone Fieldhouse

2014–15 West Coast Conference women's basketball standings
	Conf.				Overall
Team	W		L	PCT	W		L	PCT
Gonzaga	16	–	2	.889	26	–	8	.765
San Diego	14	–	4	.778	25	–	7	.781
Pacific	13	–	5	.722	21	–	10	.677
Saint Mary's	13	–	5	.722	23	–	11	.676
BYU †	12	–	6	.667	23	–	10	.697
San Francisco	8	–	10	.444	19	–	14	.576
Santa Clara	5	–	13	.278	11	–	18	.379
Loyola Marymount	4	–	14	.222	7	–	24	.226
Pepperdine	3	–	15	.167	8	–	22	.267
Portland	2	–	16	.111	4	–	26	.133
† Tournament winner As of March 29, 2015; Rankings from AP poll

The 2014–15 Pepperdine Waves women's basketball team represented Pepperdine University in the 2014–15 college basketball season. The Waves, members of the West Coast Conference, were led by second year coach Ryan Weisenberg. The Waves played their home games at the Firestone Fieldhouse on the university campus in Malibu, California. They finished the season 8–22, 3–15 in WCC play to finish in ninth place. They lost in the first round of the WCC women's tournament to Loyola Marymount.

== Roster ==
2014–15 Pepperdine Waves women's basketball team
Players
Coaches

Pos.	#	Name	Height	Year	Previous school	Hometown
G	0	Kameron Johnston	5 ft 8 in (1.73 m)	Fr	Randall	Amarillo, TX
G	1	Whitney Williams	5 ft 8 in (1.73 m)	So	El Toro	Lake Forest, CA
G	2	Layana White	5 ft 9 in (1.75 m)	RS Jr	Bellarmine-Jefferson; Arizona	Lancaster, CA
G	3	Kim Jacobs	5 ft 10 in (1.78 m)	Fr	Agoura	Agoura Hills, CA
G	10	Bria Richardson	5 ft 8 in (1.73 m)	Sr	Serra	Hawthorne, CA
G	11	Ea Shoushtari	5 ft 8 in (1.73 m)	Sr	Los Angeles Center for Enriched Studies	Los Angeles, CA
C	14	Devin Stanback	6 ft 3 in (1.91 m)	Fr	Chaminade	West Hills, CA
G	22	Allie Green	5 ft 10 in (1.78 m)	So	Sacramento Charter	Sacramento, CA
F	24	Krista Pettepier	6 ft 2 in (1.88 m)	RS So	Ankeny; Iowa	Ankeny, IA
F/C	25	Tessa Emerson	6 ft 2 in (1.88 m)	Sr	Santa Barbara	Santa Barbara, CA
F	30	Olivia Ogwumike	5 ft 11 in (1.8 m)	Fr	Cypress Woods	Cypress, TX
F	42	Haley Videcks	6 ft 0 in (1.83 m)	RS So	Bartlett; Arizona State	Bartlett, IL
F	44	Kelsey Brockway	6 ft 1 in (1.85 m)	Jr	Palos Verdes	Rolling Hills, CA
G/F	51	Keitra Wallace	5 ft 11 in (1.8 m)	Jr	Brea Olinda	Brea, CA

Head coach

- Ryan Weisenberg (Cal Poly)

Assistant coach(es)

- Trisha Raniewicz (Cal State San Bernardino)
- Mallorie Winn (Pittsburgh)
- Jordan Adams-Smith (New Mexico)

Legend

- (C) Team captain
- (S) Suspended
- (I) Ineligible
- (W) Walk-on
- Injured
- Current redshirt

Roster

== Schedule ==
Date time, TV	Rank^{#}	Opponent^{#}	Result	Record	Site (attendance) city, state
Exhibition
11/08/2014*; 12:00 pm, WavesCast		Cal State Dominguez Hills	W 79–68	–	Firestone Fieldhouse (N/A); Malibu, CA
Non-conference Regular Season
11/15/2014*; 9:00 am, BTN+		at No. 16 Nebraska	L 65–100	0–1	Pinnacle Bank Arena (4,520); Lincoln, NE
11/19/2014*; 7:00 pm, BigWest.tv		at UC Irvine	W 76–53	1–1	Bren Events Center (241); Irvine, CA
11/21/2014*; 5:30 pm, BTN+		at No. 19 Iowa; Hawkeye Challenge	L 68–97	1–2	Carver-Hawkeye Arena (3,578); Iowa City, IA
11/22/2014*; 3:00 pm, BTN+		vs. UT Martin; Hawkeye Challenge	W 59–58	2–2	Carver-Hawkeye Arena (229); Iowa City, IA
11/25/2014*; 5:00 pm, BigWest.tv		at Cal Poly	W 76–69	3–2	Mott Gym (387); San Luis Obispo, CA
11/30/2014*; 1:00 pm, WavesCast		Army	L 44–56	3–3	Firestone Fieldhouse (N/A); Malibu, CA
12/03/2014*; 7:00 pm, WavesCast		Long Beach State	L 69–78	3–4	Firestone Fieldhouse (207); Malibu, CA
12/06/2014*; 4:00 pm, BigWest.tv		at Cal State Northridge	L 48–74	3–5	Matadome (501); Northridge, CA
12/12/2014*; 7:00 pm, BigWest.tv		at UC Santa Barbara	W 66–44	4–5	UC Santa Barbara Events Center (342); Santa Barbara, CA
12/16/2014*; 11:00 am, Watch Big Sky		at Northern Arizona	W 66–63	5–5	Walkup Skydome (803); Flagstaff, AZ
12/19/2014*; 1:00 pm, WavesCast		Albany	L 36–61	5–6	Firestone Fieldhouse (311); Malibu, CA
WCC Regular Season
12/29/2014; 1:00 pm, WavesCast		Loyola Marymount	W 98–91 ^{OT}	6–6 (1–0)	Firestone Fieldhouse (212); Malibu, CA
01/01/2014; 6:00 pm, TheW.tv		at Saint Mary's	L 68–73	6–7 (1–1)	McKeon Pavilion (303); Moraga, CA
01/03/2015; 2:00 pm, TheW.tv		at Pacific	L 60–77	6–8 (1–2)	Alex G. Spanos Center (542); Stockton, CA
01/08/2015; 7:00 pm, WavesCast		San Diego	L 64–68	6–9 (1–3)	Firestone Fieldhouse (217); Malibu, CA
01/10/2015; 12:00 pm, WavesCast		BYU	L 78–84	6–10 (1–4)	Firestone Fieldhouse (212); Malibu, CA
01/15/2015; 6:00 pm, TheW.tv		at Gonzaga	L 64–73	6–11 (1–5)	McCarthey Athletic Center (4,981); Spokane, WA
01/17/2015; 2:00 pm, Portland Portal		at Portland	L 61–80	6–12 (1–6)	Chiles Center (247); Portland, OR
01/22/2015; 7:00 pm, WavesCast		San Francisco	L 58–69	6–13 (1–7)	Firestone Fieldhouse (203); Malibu, CA
01/24/2015; 12:00 pm, WavesCast		Santa Clara	L 54–65	6–14 (1–8)	Firestone Fieldhouse (214); Malibu, CA
01/29/2015; 7:00 pm, WavesCast		Pacific	L 59–63	6–15 (1–9)	Firestone Fieldhouse (167); Malibu, CA
01/31/2015; 12:00 pm, WavesCast		Saint Mary's	L 49–53	6–16 (1–10)	Firestone Fieldhouse (152); Malibu, CA
02/05/2015; 6:00 pm, BYUtv		at BYU	L 58–77	6–17 (1–10)	Marriott Center (585); Provo, UT
02/07/2015; 2:00 pm, TheW.tv		at San Diego	L 55–72	6–18 (1–11)	Jenny Craig Pavilion (466); San Diego, CA
02/12/2015; 7:00 pm, WavesCast		Portland	W 76–72	7–18 (2–11)	Firestone Fieldhouse (202); Malibu, CA
02/14/2015; 12:00 pm, WavesCast		Gonzaga	L 56–78	7–19 (2–12)	Firestone Fieldhouse (246); Malibu, CA
02/19/2015; 7:00 pm, Santa Clara Portal		at Santa Clara	L 66–84	7–20 (2–14)	Leavey Center (N/A); Santa Clara, CA
02/21/2015; 2:00 pm, TheW.tv		at San Francisco	W 76–65	8–20 (3–14)	War Memorial Gymnasium (418); San Francisco, CA
02/28/2014; 2:00 pm, LMUSN		at Loyola Marymount	L 57–74	8–21 (3–15)	Gersten Pavilion (505); Los Angeles, CA
2015 WCC Tournament
03/05/2015; 12:00 pm, BYUtv		vs. Loyola Marymount; First Round	L 67–68	8–22	Orleans Arena (N/A); Paradise, NV
*Non-conference game. ^{#}Rankings from AP Poll. (#) Tournament seedings in parentheses. All times are in Pacific Time.

== Rankings ==
+ Regular season polls	Poll	Pre- Season	Week 1	Week 2	Week 3	Week 4	Week 5	Week 6	Week 7	Week 8	Week 9	Week 10	Week 11	Week 12	Week 13	Week 14	Week 15	Week 16	Week 17	Week 18	Final
AP																					
Coaches																					

Legend
	Increase in ranking
	Decrease in ranking
	No change
(RV)	Received votes
