= 2014–15 Sacramento State Hornets women's basketball team =

Intercollegiate basketball season

2014–15 Sacramento State Hornets women's basketball

WNIT, Third round
- Conference: Big Sky Conference
- Record: 18–16 (13–5 Big Sky)
- Head coach: Bunky Harkleroad (2nd season)
- Assistant coaches: Kim Stephens; Bill Baxter; Derrick Florence
- Home arena: Hornets Nest

2014–15 Big Sky women's basketball standings
	Conf.				Overall
Team	W		L	PCT	W		L	PCT
Montana†	14	–	4	.778	24	–	9	.727
Sacramento State	13	–	5	.722	18	–	16	.529
Eastern Washington	12	–	6	.667	21	–	12	.636
Northern Colorado	12	–	6	.667	22	–	13	.629
North Dakota	9	–	9	.500	17	–	15	.531
Montana State	9	–	9	.500	15	–	15	.500
Northern Arizona	9	–	9	.500	13	–	17	.433
Idaho	8	–	10	.444	14	–	15	.483
Idaho State	8	–	10	.444	13	–	17	.433
Southern Utah	6	–	12	.333	13	–	15	.464
Weber State	6	–	12	.333	11	–	18	.379
Portland State	2	–	16	.111	4	–	25	.138
† 2015 Big Sky tournament winner As of March 26, 2015; Rankings from AP poll

The 2014–15 Sacramento State Hornets women's basketball team represented California State University, Sacramento during the 2014–15 NCAA Division I women's basketball season. The Hornets, were led by second year head coach Bunky Harkleroad and played their home games at Hornets Nest. They were members of the Big Sky Conference. They finished the season 18–16, 13–5 in Big Sky play to finish in second place. They advanced to the semifinals of the Big Sky tournament where they lost to Northern Colorado. They were invited to the Women's National Invitation Tournament where they defeated Pacific and Eastern Washington in the first and second rounds before losing in the third round to Saint Mary's.

== Roster ==
2014–15 Sacramento State Hornets women's basketball team
Players
Coaches

Pos.	#	Name	Height	Year	Previous school	Hometown
G	1	Fantasia Hilliard	5 ft 3 in (1.6 m)	Sr	Sacramento HS	Sacramento, California
G	2	Taylor Brown	5 ft 7 in (1.7 m)	Fr	Chino HS	Chino, California
G	3	Brianna Burgos	5 ft 6 in (1.68 m)	RS So	Sheldon HS; Sonoma State	Sacramento, California
G	4	Ericka Magaña	5 ft 7 in (1.7 m)	Jr	Inderkum HS; Sierra CC	Sacramento, California
G	5	Kelli Robinson	5 ft 6 in (1.68 m)	Fr	Woodbridge HS	Irvine, California
F	10	Margaret Huntington	6 ft 0 in (1.83 m)	So	Bishop O'Dowd HS	Oakland, California
G	11	Takara Burse	5 ft 8 in (1.73 m)	Sr	Eastside Prep HS	East Palo Alto, California
G	12	Ashlyn Crenshaw	5 ft 8 in (1.73 m)	So	Lincoln HS	Stockton, California
G	14	Justyce Dawson	5 ft 4 in (1.63 m)	Fr	Long Beach Poly HS	Carson, California
F	15	Sydonia Daniels	6 ft 1 in (1.85 m)	Jr	Arts HS; State Fair CC	Irvington, New Jersey
G	20	Adella Randle-El	5 ft 8 in (1.73 m)	Jr	J.I. Case HS; State Fair CC	Racine, Wisconsin
G	22	Maranne Johnson	5 ft 7 in (1.7 m)	Fr	Deer Valley HS	Antioch, California
F	24	Gretchen Harrigan	5 ft 8 in (1.73 m)	So	Casa Grande HS; Santa Rosa JC	Petaluma, California
F	30	Kyhonta Doughty	6 ft 1 in (1.85 m)	So	Warren Easton HS; Trinity Valley CC	New Orleans, Louisiana
G	32	Andrea Chenier	5 ft 11 in (1.8 m)	So	Piedmont HS; New Mexico State	Piedmont, California

Head coach

- Bunky Harkleroad

Assistant coach(es)

- Kim Stephens
- Bill Baxter
- Derrick Florence

Legend

- (C) Team captain
- (S) Suspended
- (I) Ineligible
- (W) Walk-on
- Injured
- Current redshirt

Roster

== Schedule ==
Date time, TV	Rank^{#}	Opponent^{#}	Result	Record	Site (attendance) city, state
Regular season
11/14/2014*; 2:00 pm		at San Diego State	L 91–99	0–1	Viejas Arena (391); San Diego, California
11/16/2014*; 2:00 pm		at Cal State Northridge	L 66–81	0–2	Matadome (347); Northridge, California
11/18/2014*; 7:00 pm		UC Davis	L 82–90	0–3	Hornets Nest (494); Sacramento, California
11/20/2014*; 7:00 pm		New Mexico State	W 93–85	1–3	Hornets Nest (317); Sacramento, California
11/24/2014*; 6:00 pm		at Saint Mary's	L 91–99	1–4	McKeon Pavilion (445); Moraga, California
12/03/2014*; 11:00 am		at No. 10 California	L 94–107	1–5	Haas Pavilion (2,948); Berkeley, California
12/06/2014*; 2:00 pm		at No. 17 Oregon State	L 61–109	1–6	Gill Coliseum (2,204); Corvallis, Oregon
12/12/2014*; 7:00 pm		at UCLA	L 83–92	1–7	Pauley Pavilion (665); Los Angeles, California
12/14/2014*; 2:00 pm		at USC	L 99–101	1–8	Galen Center (498); Los Angeles, California
12/19/2014*; 7:00 pm		Utah State	W 102–92	2–8	Hornets Nest (258); Sacramento, California
12/22/2014*; 2:00 pm		at San Jose State	L 94–102	2–9	Event Center Arena (553); San Jose, California
01/01/2015; 1:00 pm		at Northern Arizona	L 60–64	2–10 (0–1)	Walkup Skydome (204); Flagstaff, Arizona
01/03/2015; 6:00 pm		at Southern Utah	W 69–67	3–10 (1–1)	Centrum Arena (527); Cedar City, Utah
01/08/2015; 7:00 pm		North Dakota	W 93–86	4–10 (2–1)	Hornets Nest (224); Sacramento, California
01/10/2015; 2:00 pm		Northern Colorado	W 76–71	5–10 (3–1)	Hornets Nest (403); Sacramento, California
01/15/2015; 6:00 pm		at Idaho	W 107–89	6–10 (4–1)	Cowan Spectrum (591); Moscow, Idaho
01/17/2015; 2:00 pm		at Eastern Washington	W 73–67	7–10 (5–1)	Reese Court (617); Cheney, Washington
01/22/2015; 7:00 pm		Idaho State	W 84–53	8–10 (6–1)	Hornets Nest (417); Sacramento, California
01/24/2015; 2:00 pm		Weber State	W 108–65	9–10 (7–1)	Hornets Nest (652); Sacramento, California
01/29/2015; 6:00 pm		at Montana State	L 64–91	9–11 (7–2)	Worthington Arena (885); Bozeman, Montana
01/31/2015; 1:00 pm		at Montana	L 86–94	9–12 (7–3)	Dahlberg Arena (3,301); Missoula, Montana
01/31/2015; 7:00 pm		at Portland State	W 92–60	10–12 (8–3)	Stott Center (429); Portland, Oregon
02/12/2015; 7:00 pm		Eastern Washington	L 79–80	10–13 (9–3)	Hornets Nest (422); Sacramento, California
02/14/2015; 2:00 pm		Idaho	W 92–84	11–13 (9–4)	Hornets Nest (370); Sacramento, California
02/19/2015; 6:00 pm		at Northern Colorado	L 76–78	11–14 (9–5)	Bank of Colorado Arena (510); Greeley, Colorado
02/21/2015; 12:00 pm		at North Dakota	W 64–62	12–14 (10–5)	Betty Engelstad Sioux Center (1,767); Grand Forks, North Dakota
02/28/2015; 12:00 pm		Portland State	W 123–77	13–14 (11–5)	Hornets Nest (380); Sacramento, California
03/05/2015; 7:00 pm		Southern Utah	W 107–73	14–14 (12–5)	Hornets Nest (387); Sacramento, California
03/07/2015; 2:00 pm		Northern Arizona	W 105–81	15–14 (13–5)	Hornets Nest (506); Sacramento, California
Big Sky Women's Tournament
03/11/2015*; 10:00 am	(2)	vs. (7) Montana State; Quarterfinals	W 78–62	16–14	Dahlberg Arena (308); Missoula, Montana
03/13/2015*; 10:30 am	(2)	vs. (3) Northern Colorado; Semifinals	L 79–81 ^{OT}	16–15	Dahlberg Arena (1,382); Missoula, Montana
WNIT
03/19/2015*; 7:00 pm		at Pacific; First Round	W 87–79	17–15	Alex G. Spanos Center (918); Stockton, California
03/23/2015*; 7:00 pm		Eastern Washington; Second Round	W 84–49	18–15	Hornets Nest (536); Sacramento, California
03/26/2015*; 7:00 pm		Saint Mary's; Third Round	L 69–77	18–16	Hornets Nest (626); Sacramento, California
*Non-conference game. ^{#}Rankings from AP Poll. (#) Tournament seedings in parentheses. All times are in Pacific Time.

== See also ==
- 2014–15 Sacramento State Hornets men's basketball team
