= 2015 Women's National Invitation Tournament =

American college basketball tournament

- Season: 2014–15
- Teams: 64
- Finals site: Charleston Civic Center, Charleston, West Virginia
- Champions: UCLA (1st title)
- Runner-up: West Virginia (2nd title game)
- Semifinalists: Michigan; Temple
- Winning coach: Cori Close (1st title)
- MVP: Jordin Canada (UCLA)
- Attendance: 8,403 (championship game)

The 2015 Women's National Invitation Tournament was a single-elimination tournament of 64 NCAA Division I teams that were not selected to participate in the 2015 Women's NCAA tournament. The annual tournament began on March 18 and ended on April 4, with the championship game televised on CBS Sports Network. All games were played on the campus sites of participating schools. The Tournament was won by the UCLA Bruins who defeated the West Virginia Mountaineers, 62–60, in the final before a crowd of 8,658 at the Charleston Civic Center in Charleston, West Virginia, on April 4. It was UCLA's first WNIT title. UCLA's Jordin Canada was named the tournament's most valuable player.

== Participants ==
Sixty-four teams were selected to participate in the 2015 WNIT. Thirty-two teams received automatic berths into the tournament from being the highest-ranked team in their conference that failed to make the NCAA Women's Tournament. The other 32 teams earned at-large bids, by having a winning record but failing to make the NCAA Women's Tournament. If a conference’s automatic qualifier declines the WNIT invitation, the conference forfeits that automatic spot, and that selection goes into the pool of at-large schools.

=== Automatic qualifiers ===
Conference	School
America East	Maine
American	Tulsa
Atlantic 10	Duquesne
ACC	Virginia
Atlantic Sun	Stetson
Big 12	TCU
Big East	Villanova
Big Sky	Sacramento State
Big South	Radford
Big Ten	Michigan
Big West	Hawai'i
Colonial	Drexel
C-USA	Middle Tennessee
Horizon	Wright State
Ivy League	Penn
MAAC	Marist
MAC	Ball State
MEAC	Hampton
Missouri Valley	Drake
Mountain West	Colorado State
Northeast	Central Connecticut
Ohio Valley	Tennessee–Martin
Pac-12	UCLA
Patriot	Army
SEC	Missouri
Southern	East Tennessee State
Southland	Stephen F. Austin
SWAC	Texas Southern
Summit	South Dakota
Sun Belt	Arkansas State
WCC	San Diego
WAC	Cal State Bakersfield

=== At-large bids ===
Conference	School
MAC	Akron
MAC	Buffalo
Horizon	Cleveland State
Big East	Creighton
American	East Carolina
MAC	Eastern Michigan
Big Sky	Eastern Washington
Colonial	Elon
Atlantic 10	Fordham
Mountain West	Fresno State
ACC	Georgia Tech
Colonial	Hofstra
Big 12	Kansas State
Big West	Long Beach State
MVC	Missouri State
ACC	NC State
Big Sky	Northern Colorado
MVC	Northern Iowa
C-USA	Old Dominion
SEC	Ole Miss
WCC	Pacific
Atlantic 10	Richmond
WCC	Saint Mary's
WCC	San Francisco
C-USA	Southern Miss
Big East	St. John's
American	Temple
MAC	Toledo
Pac-12	Washington State
Big 12	West Virginia
MAC	Western Michigan
Horizon	Youngstown State

== Bracket ==
=== West Region ===
Round 1 March 18–20
Washington State	66
Eastern Washington	67
Pacific	79
Sacramento State	83
Fresno State	79
San Francisco	73
St. Mary's (CA)	92*
Hawai'i	88
Colorado State	48
Northern Colorado	53
South Dakota	68
Creighton	58
UCLA	70
CS Bakersfield	54
San Diego	63
Long Beach State	58

Round 2 March 22–24
Eastern Washington	49
Sacramento State	84
Fresno State	64
St. Mary's (CA)	83
Northern Colorado	59
South Dakota	58
UCLA	63
San Diego	58

Round 3 March 25–27
Sacramento State	69
St. Mary's (CA)	77
Northern Colorado	60
UCLA	74

Quarterfinals; March 28–30
St. Mary's (CA)	66
UCLA	82

=== Midwest Region ===
Round 1 March 18–20
Michigan	72
Cleveland State	50
Toledo	72
Wright State	64
Kansas State	86
Akron	68
Northern Iowa	61
Missouri	69
Drake	70
Eastern Michigan	80
Missouri State	72
Tulsa	78
Southern Mississippi	79
Texas Southern	69
Texas Christian	85
Stephen F. Austin	80

Round 2 March 22–24
Michigan	74
Toledo	58
Kansas State	48
Missouri	67
Eastern Michigan	69
Tulsa	59
Southern Mississippi	77*
Texas Christian	73

Round 3 March 25–27
Michigan	65
Missouri	55
Eastern Michigan	65
Southern Mississippi	76

Quarterfinals; March 28–30
Michigan	69
Southern Mississippi	60

* - Denotes overtime

=== South Region ===
Round 1 March 18–20
Middle Tennessee St.	69
Ball State	58
Arkansas State	61
Western Michigan	49
Georgia Tech	69
Elon	47
Ole Miss	80
Tennessee-Martin	70
Marist	54
Temple	67
Penn	65
Hofstra	58
East Carolina	74
Radford	52
East Tennessee State	58
North Carolina State	73

Round 2 March 22–24
Middle Tennessee St.	70
Arkansas State	60
Georgia Tech	48
Ole Miss	63
Temple	61
Penn	56
East Carolina	65
North Carolina State	69

Round 3 March 25–27
Middle Tennessee St.	82
Ole Miss	70
Temple	80*
North Carolina State	79

Quarterfinals; March 28–30
Middle Tennessee State	57
Temple	69

* - Denotes overtime

=== East Region ===
Round 1 March 18–20
Youngstown State	54
Duquesne	72
Stetson	66
Richmond	67
West Virginia	84
Buffalo	61
Drexel	42
Hampton	45
Fordham	70
Central Connecticut State	67
St. John's	64
Army	56
Villanova	71
Maine	60
Old Dominion	69
Virginia	62

Round 2 March 22–24
Duquesne	48
Richmond	47
West Virginia	57
Hampton	39
Fordham	63
St. John's	77
Villanova	71
Old Dominion	66

Round 3 March 25–27
Duquesne	39
West Virginia	60
St. John's	55
Villanova	63

Quarterfinals; March 28–30
West Virginia	75*
Villanova	70

* - Denotes overtime

=== Semifinals and championship game ===
Semifinals; April 1
UCLA	69
Michigan	65
Temple	58
West Virginia	66*

Championship Game; April 4 CBSSN
UCLA	62
West Virginia	60

* - Denotes overtime

Championship Game was played at Charleston Civic Center, Charleston, West Virginia.

== All-tournament team ==
- Jordin Canada, UCLA (MVP)
- Nicole Elmblad, Michigan
- Averee Fields, West Virginia
- Nirra Fields, UCLA
- Bria Holmes, West Virginia
- Tyonna Williams, Temple

== See also ==
- 2015 National Invitation Tournament
