= 2015 West Coast Conference women's basketball tournament =

- Classification: Division I
- Season: 2014–15
- Teams: 10
- Finals site: Orleans Arena; Paradise, Nevada
- Champions: BYU (2nd title)
- Winning coach: Jeff Judkins (2nd WCC title)
- MVP: Lexi Eaton (BYU)
- Television: ESPNU/BYUtv

2014–15 West Coast Conference women's basketball standings
	Conf.				Overall
Team	W		L	PCT	W		L	PCT
Gonzaga	16	–	2	.889	26	–	8	.765
San Diego	14	–	4	.778	25	–	7	.781
Pacific	13	–	5	.722	21	–	10	.677
Saint Mary's	13	–	5	.722	23	–	11	.676
BYU †	12	–	6	.667	23	–	10	.697
San Francisco	8	–	10	.444	19	–	14	.576
Santa Clara	5	–	13	.278	11	–	18	.379
Loyola Marymount	4	–	14	.222	7	–	24	.226
Pepperdine	3	–	15	.167	8	–	22	.267
Portland	2	–	16	.111	4	–	26	.133
† Tournament winner As of March 29, 2015; Rankings from AP poll

The 2015 West Coast Conference women's basketball tournament was held March 5–10, 2015, at Orleans Arena in the Las Vegas Valley community of Paradise, Nevada. Seeds were determined based on a schools conference record, not the overall record. The winner received the conference's automatic bid to the 2015 NCAA Division I women's basketball tournament.

== Seeds ==
WCC tiebreaker procedures went as follows:

1. Head-to-head
2. Better record against a higher seed
3. Higher RPI

2015 West Coast Conference women's basketball tournament seeds
Seed	School	Conference Record	Overall Record (End of Regular season)	Tiebreaker
1.	Gonzaga	16–2	23–6	
2.	San Diego	14–4	23–5	
3.	Pacific	13–5	21–8	2–0 vs. SMC
4.	Saint Mary's	13–5	20–9	0–2 vs. Pacific
5.	BYU	12–6	20–9	
6.	San Francisco	8–10	17–12	
7.	Santa Clara	5–13	10–17	
8.	Loyola Marymount	4–14	6–23	
9.	Pepperdine	3–15	8–21	
10.	Portland	2–16	4–25	

== Schedule ==
Session	Game	Time*	Matchup^{#}
First round – Thursday, March 5
1	1	12:00 PM	#8 Loyola Marymount vs. #9 Pepperdine
1	2	2:00 PM	#7 Santa Clara vs. #10 Portland
Quarterfinals – Thursday, March 5 & Friday, March 6
2	3	6:00 PM	#3 Pacific vs. #6 San Francisco
2	4	8:00 PM	#4 Saint Mary's vs. #5 BYU
3	5	12:00 PM	#1 Gonzaga vs. #8 Loyola Marymount
3	6	2:00 PM	#2 San Diego vs. #7 Santa Clara
Semifinals – Monday, March 9
4	7	12:00 PM	#5 BYU vs. #1 Gonzaga
4	8	2:30 PM	#6 San Francisco vs. #2 San Diego
Championship Game – Tuesday, March 10
5	9	1:00 PM	#5 BYU vs. #6 San Francisco
*Game Times in PT. #-Rankings denote tournament seeding.

== Bracket and scores ==
- All BYUtv games were simulcast online and streamed at TheW.tv.

First round Thursday, March 5 BYUtv
8	Loyola Marymount	68
9	Pepperdine	67
7	Santa Clara	66
10	Portland	58

Quarterfinals; Thurs & Fri, Mar 5–6; BYUtv
1	Gonzaga	70
8	Loyola Marymount	50
4	Saint Mary's	64
5	BYU	65
2	San Diego	51
7	Santa Clara	42
3	Pacific	64
6	San Francisco	74

Semifinals; Monday, March 9 BYUtv
1	Gonzaga	55
5	BYU	61
2	San Diego	57
6	San Francisco	65

Championship game Tuesday, March 10; ESPNU
5	BYU	76
6	San Francisco	65

== Game summaries ==
=== Loyola Marymount vs. Pepperdine ===
Series History: Loyola Marymount leads 52-20
Broadcasters: Spencer Linton & Kristen Kozlowski

BYUtv

Mar 5
12:00 pm PST

Recap

Pepperdine Waves 67, Loyola Marymount Lions 68
Scoring by half: 30-34, 37-34
Pts: Keitra Wallace 22; Rebs: Ea Shoushtari 14; Asts: Ea Shoushtari 7	Pts: Sophie Taylor 22; Rebs: Emily Ben-Jumbo, Sophie Taylor, & Bree Alford 8 Asts: Leslie Lopez-Wood 5

Orleans Arena
Paradise, NV
Attendance: 7,110
Referees: Darren B., Teresa Turner, Ify Seales

=== Santa Clara vs. Portland ===
Series History: Santa Clara leads 37-30
Broadcasters: Spencer Linton & Kristen Kozlowski

BYUtv

Mar 5
2:00 pm PST

Recap

Portland Pilots 58, Santa Clara Broncos 66
Scoring by half: 23-35, 35-31
Pts: Cassandra Brown 19; Rebs: Cassandra Brown & Cassandra Thompson 6 Asts: Jasmine Wooton 5	Pts: Nici Gilday 14; Rebs: Morgan McGwire 7 Asts: Nici Gilday & Raquel Avila 5

Orleans Arena
Paradise, NV
Attendance: 7,110
Referees: Wanda Szeremeta, In'Fini Robinson, Gordon Torigoe

=== Pacific vs. San Francisco ===
Series History: San Francisco leads 16-15
Broadcasters: Dave McCann & Blaine Fowler

BYUtv

Mar 5
6:00 pm PST

Recap

San Francisco Dons 74, Pacific Tigers 64
Scoring by half: 43-37, 31-27
Pts: Taj Winson 20; Rebs: Taj Winson 7 Asts: Paige Spietz 3	Pts: Hailie Eackles 17; Rebs: Kendall Kenyon 8 Asts: Maddison Parrish 4

Orleans Arena
Paradise, NV
Attendance: 7,110
Referees: Bart Baldwin, Brian Woods, Tiffany Bird

=== Saint Mary's vs. BYU ===
Series History: Saint Mary's leads 5-4
Broadcasters: Dave McCann & Blaine Fowler

BYUtv

Mar 5
8:00 pm PST

Recap

BYU Cougars 65, Saint Mary's Gaels 64
Scoring by half: 28-30, 37-34
Pts: Lexi Eaton 30; Rebs: Morgan Bailey 9 Asts: Kylie Maeda & Lexi Eaton 2	Pts: Lauren Nicholson 23; Rebs: Carli Rosenthal 12; Asts: Lauren Nicholson & Shannon Mauldin 1

Orleans Arena
Paradise, NV
Attendance: 7,110
Referees: Rich Waters, Benny Luna, Karen Lasuik

=== Gonzaga vs. Loyola Marymount ===
Series History: Gonzaga leads 33-27
Broadcasters: Spencer Linton & Kristen Kozlowski

BYUtv

Mar 6
12:00 pm PST

Recap

Loyola Marymount Lions 50, Gonzaga Bulldogs 70
Scoring by half: 23-28, 27-42
Pts: Sophie Taylor 16; Rebs: Bree Alford 10; Asts: Bree Alford, Makenzie Cast & Alyson Lock 2	Pts: Shelby Cheslek & Sunny Greinacher 14; Rebs: Sunny Greinacher 14; Asts: Sunny Greinacher 6

Orleans Arena
Paradise, NV
Attendance: 7,110
Referees: Karen Lasuik, Bart Baldwin, Wanda Szeremeta

=== San Diego vs. Santa Clara ===
Series History: San Diego leads 35-32
Broadcasters: Spencer Linton & Kristen Kozlowski

BYUtv

Mar 6
2:00 pm PST

Recap

Santa Clara Broncos 42, San Diego Toreros 51
Scoring by half: 19-28, 23-23
Pts: Nici Gilday 22; Rebs: Taylor Berry & Nici Gilday 6 Asts: Raquel Avila 4	Pts: Katelyn McDaniel 16; Rebs: Sophia Ederaine & Maya Hood 10; Asts: Katherine Hamilton 5

Orleans Arena
Paradise, NV
Attendance: 7,110
Referees: Darren Krzesnik, Brian Woods, In'Fini Robinson

=== BYU vs. Gonzaga ===
Series History: Gonzaga leads 11-6
Broadcasters: Dave McCann & Blaine Fowler

BYUtv

Mar 9
12:00 p.m. PDT

Recap

BYU Cougars 61, Gonzaga Bulldogs 55
Scoring by half: 22-32, 39-23
Pts: Makenzi Morrison 18; Rebs: Morgan Bailey 9 Asts: Kylie Maeda 6	Pts: Sunny Greinacher 15; Rebs: Sunny Greinacher 12; Asts: Georgia Stirton 6

Orleans Arena
Paradise, NV
Attendance: 7,110
Referees: Darren Krzesnik, Brian Woods, In'Fini Robinson

=== San Diego vs. San Francisco ===
Series History: San Diego leads 38-25
Broadcasters: Dave McCann & Blaine Fowler

BYUtv

Mar 9
2:30 p.m. PDT

Recap

San Francisco Dons 65, San Diego Toreros 57
Scoring by half: 29-42, 36-15
Pts: Taj Winston 18; Rebs: Taylor Proctor 10; Asts: Taylor Proctor 4	Pts: Katelyn McDaniel 11; Rebs: Sophia Ederaine 12; Asts: Sophi Ederaine 4

Orleans Arena
Paradise, NV
Attendance: 7,110
Referees: Shelley Rusi, Karen Lasuik, Bart Baldwin

=== WCC Championship: San Francisco vs. BYU ===
Series History: BYU leads series 12-2
Broadcasters: Beth Mowins & Katie Smith (ESPNU)
Dave McCann & Blaine Fowler; Spencer Linton & Ben Bagley–Halftime (BYU Radio)

ESPNU
BYU Radio

Mar 10
1:00 p.m. PDT

San Francisco Dons 65, BYU Cougars 76
Scoring by half: 27-39, 38-37
Pts: Taj Winston 24; Rebs: Taj Winston & Paige Spietz 10; Asts: Zhane Dikes & Taylor Proctor 3	Pts: Lexi Eaton 22; Rebs: Morgan Bailey 8 Asts: Kylie Maeda 5

Orleans Arena
Paradise, NV
Attendance: 8,000
Referees: Robert Scofield, Anita Ortega, Michol Murray

== All-Tournament team ==
Player, School, Yr., Pos.
Lexi Eaton, BYU, Jr., G (Most Outstanding Player)
Morgan Bailey, BYU, RS Sr., F
Makenzi Morrison, BYU, RS So., G
Taj Winston, San Francisco, Sr., G
Sunny Greinacher, Gonzaga, Sr., F

== See also ==
- 2014–15 NCAA Division I women's basketball season
- West Coast Conference men's basketball tournament
- 2015 West Coast Conference men's basketball tournament
- 2014–15 West Coast Conference women's basketball season
- West Coast Conference women's basketball tournament
