= 2011–12 West Coast Conference women's basketball season =

2011–12 West Coast Conference Women's Basketball Season
- League: NCAA Division I
- Sport: Basketball
- Teams: 9
- TV partner(s): ESPNU, BYUtv, SWX, CBSSN

Regular Season
- Season champions: Gonzaga
- Runners-up: BYU
- Season MVP: Kristen Riley, BYU

Tournament
- Champions: BYU
- Runners-up: Gonzaga
- Finals MVP: Haley Steed, BYU

Basketball seasons
- ← 10–11 12–13 →

2011–12 West Coast Conference women's basketball standings
	Conf.				Overall
Team	W		L	PCT	W		L	PCT
Gonzaga	14	–	2	.875	28	–	6	.824
BYU†	12	–	4	.750	26	–	7	.788
San Diego	12	–	4	.750	26	–	10	.722
Saint Mary's	11	–	5	.688	22	–	11	.667
Pepperdine	8	–	8	.500	14	–	15	.483
Santa Clara	5	–	11	.313	12	–	18	.400
Portland	4	–	12	.250	12	–	20	.375
San Francisco	3	–	13	.188	5	–	25	.167
Loyola Marymount	3	–	13	.188	8	–	22	.267
† 2012 West Coast Conference women's basketball tournament winner As of March 28, 2012/ FINAL 2011–12 STANDINGS; Rankings from AP Poll

The 2011–12 West Coast Conference women's basketball season began with practices in October 2011 and ended with the 2012 West Coast Conference women's basketball tournament from February 29- March 5, 2012 at the Orleans Arena in Las Vegas. The regular season began on the weekend of November 11, with the conference schedule starting on December 29.

This was the 27th season for WCC women's basketball, which began in the 1985–86 season when the league was known as the West Coast Athletic Conference (WCAC). It was also the 22nd season under the West Coast Conference name (the conference began as the California Basketball Association in 1952, became the WCAC in 1956, and dropped the word "Athletic" in 1989). In July 2011, a new faith based, private school joined the conference. BYU came from the Mountain West, marking the WCC's first change in membership since 1980.

== Pre-season ==
- Pre-season media day was held on October 27, 2011, at YouTube's headquarters in San Bruno, California.
- 2011–12 West Coast Women's Basketball Media Poll:

Rank, School (first-place votes), Points
1. Gonzaga University (8), 64
2. Brigham Young University (1), 52
3. Pepperdine University, 50
4. Loyola Marymount University, 36
5. Saint Mary's College, 34
6. University of Portland, 32
7. University of San Diego, 26
8. Santa Clara University, 22
9. University of San Francisco, 8

- 2011–12 West Coast Women's Preseason All-West Conference Team:

Player, School, Yr., Pos.
Dominique Conners, USD, Sr., G
Alex Cowling, Loyola Marymount, RS-Jr., G/F
Natalie Day, Portland, Sr.., G/F
Jazmine Jackson, Pepperdine, Sr., G
Katelan Redmon, Gonzaga, Sr., G/F
Kristen Riley, Brigham Young University, Sr., F
Alyssa Shoji, Santa Clara, Sr., G
Jasmine Smith, Saint Mary's, RS-Sr., G
Kayla Standish, Gonzaga, Sr., F
ReZina TecleMariam, Portland, Sr., G

== Rankings ==
Legend
	Improvement in ranking
	Drop in ranking
RV	Received votes but were not ranked in Top 25 of poll

		Pre/ Wk 1	Wk 2	Wk 3	Wk 4	Wk 5	Wk 6	Wk 7	Wk 8	Wk 9	Wk 10	Wk 11	Wk 12	Wk 13	Wk 14	Wk 15	Wk 16	Wk 17	Wk 18	Wk 19	Final
BYU	AP					RV	RV	RV			RV	23	22	RV	23	RV				RV	
BYU	C							RV				RV	RV	RV	RV						
Gonzaga	AP	RV	RV	RV	RV	RV	RV	RV	RV	23	RV	22	20	19	RV	25	22	23	23	RV	
Gonzaga	C	RV	RV	24	RV	25	24	24	24	22	25	20	19	18	23	21	20	24	24	24	
Loyola Marymount	AP																				
Loyola Marymount	C																				
Pepperdine	AP																				
Pepperdine	C																				
Portland	AP																				
Portland	C																				
Saint Mary's	AP										RV	RV									
Saint Mary's	C																				
San Diego	AP																				
San Diego	C																				
San Francisco	AP																				
San Francisco	C																				
Santa Clara	AP																				
Santa Clara	C																				

== Non-Conference games ==
- BYU would lose to #8 Duke 61–55 on November 11, 2011.

== Conference games ==
- 2 Conference Games would be shown nationally on CBS Sports Network- Portland at San Diego on January 19, 2012, and Loyola Marymount at Gonzaga on January 26, 2012.
- BYUtv would show all home BYU games except for the Saint Mary's game on February 4, 2012.
- SWX Right Now would show all Gonzaga home games except for the game shown nationally on CBS Sports Network.
- In Week 11 the WCC had two teams rank in the Top 25 for the first time in the conference's history with BYU and Gonzaga both claiming Top 25 spots.

=== Composite Matrix ===
This table summarizes the head-to-head results between teams in conference play. (x) indicates games remaining this season.

	BYU	Gonzaga	LMU	Pepperdine	Portland	Saint Mary's	San Diego	San Francisco	Santa Clara
vs. Brigham Young	–	1–1	0–2	1–1	0–2	1–1	0–2	1–1	0–2
vs. Gonzaga	1–1	–	0–2	0–2	0–2	1–1	0–2	0–2	0–2
vs. Loyola Marymount	2–0	2–0	–	2–0	1–1	2–0	2–0	1–1	1–1
vs. Pepperdine	1–1	2–0	0–2	–	1–1	2–0	2–0	0–2	0–2
vs. Portland	2–0	2–0	1–1	1–1	–	2–0	2–0	0–2	2–0
vs. Saint Mary's	1–1	1–1	0–2	0–2	0–2	–	2–0	1–1	0–2
vs. San Diego	2–0	2–0	0–2	0–2	0–2	0–2	–	0–2	0–2
vs. San Francisco	1–1	2–0	1–1	2–0	2–0	1–1	2–0	–	2–0
vs. Santa Clara	2–0	2–0	1–1	2–0	0–2	2–0	2–0	0–2	–
Total	12–4	14–2	3–13	8–8	4–12	11–5	12–4	3–13	5–11

== Conference tournament ==
- February 29- March 5, 2012 – West Coast Conference Basketball Tournament, Orleans Arena, Las Vegas, NV.

== Head coaches ==
Jeff Judkins, BYU
Kelly Graves, Gonzaga
Julie Wilhoit, Loyola Marymount
Julie Rousseau, Pepperdine
Jim Sollars, Portland
Paul Thomas, Saint Mary's
Cindy Fisher, San Diego
Jennifer Azzi, San Francisco
Jennifer Mountain, Santa Clara

== Post-season ==
=== NCAA tournament ===
- Gonzaga was an 11-seed. They advanced to the Sweet Sixteen after winning the 1st and 2nd Round games on their home court.
- BYU was a 10-seed. They lost in the first round against DePaul on the DePaul men's team home court.

=== WNIT ===
- San Diego was granted the WCC's automatic bid to the WNIT after Gonzaga was taken as an at large team. They played into the semifinals on the WNIT before they were finally defeated at Oklahoma State. USD won 2 road games to make the semifinals of the WNIT- at Texas Tech in the regional semi's and then at Washington in the regional final.
- Saint Mary's was taken as an at-large selection. They defeated UNLV in the first round before losing at Oregon State. Oregon State would lose in the next round to Washington who was eliminated by fellow WCC school San Diego in the quarterfinals.

=== WBI ===
- No WCC school qualified for the WBI.

== Awards and honors ==
=== Primetime Performers Honor Roll by Collegesports360.com ===
- Haiden Palmer, Gonzaga, Week of Dec 19–25
- Alex Carbonel, Saint Mary's, Week of Jan 9–15
- Taelor Karr, Gonzaga, Week of Jan 23–29
- Jennifer Hamson, BYU, Week of Feb 6–12

=== Player-of-the-Week ===
- Nov. 14 – Natalie Day, Portland
- Nov. 28 – Natalie Day, Portland
- Dec. 12 – Alex Cowling, Loyola Marymount
- Dec. 26 – Jasmine Smith, Saint Mary's
- Jan. 9 – Dominique Conners, San Diego
- Jan. 23 – Katelan Redmon, Gonzaga
- Feb. 6 – Lauren Bell, Pepperdine
- Feb. 20 – Kelly Bowen, Gonzaga
- Nov. 21 – Natalie Day, Portland
- Dec. 5 – Kim Parker, BYU
- Dec. 19 – Haiden Palmer, Gonzaga
- Jan. 2 – Morgan Woodrow, San Diego
- Jan. 16 – Alex Carbonel, Saint Mary's
- Jan. 30 – Kristen Riley, BYU
- Feb. 13 – Kim Parker, BYU
- Feb. 27 – Katelan Redmon, Gonzaga

=== Player-of-the-Month ===
- November – Natalie Day, Portland
- December – Alex Cowling, Loyola Marymount
- January – Kristen Riley, BYU
- February – Kristen Riley, BYU

=== All West Coast Conference teams ===
Voting was by conference coaches:

- Player of The Year: Kristen Riley, BYU
- Co-Newcomer of The Year: Lexi Eaton, BYU
- Co-Newcomer of the Year: Haiden Palmer, Gonzaga
- Defensive Player of The Year: Jazmine Jackson, Pepperdine
- Coach of The Year: Cindy Fisher, San Diego

=== All-Conference team ===
Name	School	Pos.	Year	Ht.	Hometown
Dominique Conners	San Diego	G	Senior	5' 8"	Oceanside, California
Alex Cowling	Loyola Marymount	G/F	RS Junior	5' 11"	Benicia, California
Natalie Day	Portland	F/G	Senior	6' 0"	Germantown, Maryland
Jazmine Jackson	Pepperdine	G	Senior	5' 9"	Oakland, California
Katelan Redmon	Gonzaga	G/F	Senior	6' 1"	Spokane, Washington
Kristen Riley	BYU	F	Senior	6' 3"	San Clemente, California
Jasmine Smith	Saint Mary's	G	Senior	5' 8"	Pinole, California
Kayla Standish	Gonzaga	F	Senior	6' 2"	Ellensburg, Washington
Haley Steed	BYU	G	Senior	5' 4"	Syracuse, Utah
Morgan Woodrow	San Diego	F	Senior	6' 0"	Fremont, California

=== Honorable mention ===
Name	School
Rheina Ale	San Francisco
Lauren Bell	Pepperdine
Alex Carbonel	Saint Mary's
Amy Kame	San Diego
Lindsay Leo	Santa Clara
Jackie Nared	Saint Mary's
Haiden Palmer	Gonzaga
Alyssa Shoji	Santa Clara

=== All-Freshman team ===
Name	School	Pos.	Ht.	Hometown
Lexi Eaton	BYU	G	5' 10"	Mapleton, Utah
Carli Rosenthal	Saint Mary's	F	6' 3"	Coeur dʼAlene, Idaho
Kari Luttinen	Portland	G	5' 10"	Seattle, Washington
Sunny Greinacher	Gonzaga	F	6' 4"	Essen, Germany
Taj Winston	San Francisco	G	5' 10"	Long Beach, California

=== All Academic team ===
Player, School	Year	GPA	Major
Ashley Armstrong, Santa Clara	Junior	3.86	Anthropology
Courtney Collishaw, Loyola Marymount	Senior	3.26	Sociology
Meagan Fulps, Santa Clara	Junior	3.63	Communication
Jennifer Hamson, BYU	Sophomore	3.70	Exercise Science
Kim Parker, BYU	Sophomore	3.78	School Health
Kelsey Patrick, Pepperdine	Junior	3.80	Advertising
Amy Pupa, Portland	Sophomore	3.49	Business
Ricki Radanovich, Santa Clara	Sophomore	3.34	Accounting
Shannon Reader, Gonzaga	Senior	3.26	Public Relations
Vania Singleterry, San Francisco	Senior	3.57	Exercise Sport Science

== See also ==
- 2011-12 NCAA Division I men's basketball season
- West Coast Conference men's basketball tournament
- 2011–12 West Coast Conference men's basketball season
- West Coast Conference women's basketball tournament
- 2012 West Coast Conference women's basketball tournament
