= West Coast Conference Tournament =

West Coast Conference Tournament may refer to:

- West Coast Conference Men's Basketball Tournament, the men's basketball championship tournament
- West Coast Conference Women's Basketball Tournament, the women's basketball championship tournament
