= 2012 West Coast Conference women's basketball tournament =

- Classification: Division I
- Teams: 9
- Site: Orleans Arena; Paradise, NV
- Finals site: Orleans Arena; Paradise, NV
- Champions: BYU (1st title)
- Winning coach: Jeff Judkins (1st WCC title)
- MVP: Haley Steed (BYU)
- Television: ESPNU/BYUtv

2011–12 West Coast Conference women's basketball standings
	Conf.				Overall
Team	W		L	PCT	W		L	PCT
Gonzaga	14	–	2	.875	28	–	6	.824
BYU†	12	–	4	.750	26	–	7	.788
San Diego	12	–	4	.750	26	–	10	.722
Saint Mary's	11	–	5	.688	22	–	11	.667
Pepperdine	8	–	8	.500	14	–	15	.483
Santa Clara	5	–	11	.313	12	–	18	.400
Portland	4	–	12	.250	12	–	20	.375
San Francisco	3	–	13	.188	5	–	25	.167
Loyola Marymount	3	–	13	.188	8	–	22	.267
† 2012 West Coast Conference women's basketball tournament winner As of March 28, 2012/ FINAL 2011–12 STANDINGS; Rankings from AP Poll

The 2012 West Coast Conference women's basketball tournament was held February 29 though March 5 at the Orleans Arena in the Las Vegas area community of Paradise, Nevada.

== Format ==
With the addition of BYU to the conference, a new format will be introduced for the 2012 tournament. The tournament will now start on Wednesday instead of Friday, and a first round 8 vs. 9 game has been added. The winner of the 8/9 game will play the 5 seed on Day 2 of the Tournament (Thursday) as well as the 6 vs. 7 match. BYUtv Sports will broadcast all the games from the second round through the semifinals. Day 3, or the Quarterfinals (Friday), will feature the winner of the 5/8/9 game playing the 4 seed and the winner of the 6/7 game playing the 3 seed. The semifinals (Saturday) will feature the appearance of the top 2 seeds. All teams will be off on Sunday, and the championship game will be played Monday afternoon on ESPNU.

== Seeds ==
2012 West Coast Conference women's basketball tournament seeds
Seed	School	Conference Record	Overall Record (End of Regular season)	Tiebreaker
1.	#22 Gonzaga	14–2	25–4	
2.	BYU	12–4	24–6	BYU swept USD 2–0 during regular season
3.	San Diego	12–4	21–7	
4.	Saint Mary's	11–5	19–9	
5.	Pepperdine	8–8	13–14	
6.	Santa Clara	5–11	12–17	
7.	Portland	4–12	11–19	
8.	San Francisco	3–13	5–24	USF swept LMU 2–0 during regular season
9.	Loyola Marymount	3–13	7–21	

== Schedule ==
All games on TV were streamed live online on ESPN3 and on Facebook.com. ESPN Full Court broadcast all the BYUtv games except for the first semi-final. All BYUtv games were also streamed online at www.byutvsports.com/gameday.

Session	Game	Time*	Matchup^{#}
First round – Wednesday, February 29
1	1	3:00 PM	#8 San Francisco vs #9 Loyola Marymount
Second round – Thursday, March 1
2	2	12:00 PM	#5 Pepperdine vs #9 Loyola Marymount
2	3	2:30 PM	#6 Santa Clara vs #7 Portland
Quarterfinals – Friday, March 2
3	4	12:00 PM	#4 Saint Mary's vs. #5 Pepperdine
3	5	2:30 PM	#3 San Diego vs. #7 Portland
Semifinals – Saturday, March 3
4	6	12:00 PM	#1 Gonzaga vs. #4 Saint Mary's
4	7	2:30 PM	#2 BYU vs. #3 San Diego
Championship Game – Monday, March 5
5	8	12:00 PM	#1 Gonzaga vs. #2 BYU
*Game Times in PT. #-Rankings denote tournament seeding.

== Bracket and scores ==
First round Wednesday, February 29, 2012 wccsports.com
8	San Francisco	60
9	Loyola Marymount	66

Second round Thursday, March 1, 2012; BYUtv
1	#22 Gonzaga
(bye)
4	Saint Mary's
(bye)
5	Pepperdine	56
9	Loyola Marymount	45
2	BYU
(bye)
3	San Diego
(bye)
6	Santa Clara	76
7	Portland	90

Quarterfinals; Friday, March 2, 2012; BYUtv
1	#22 Gonzaga
(bye)
4	Saint Mary's	67
5	Pepperdine	63
2	BYU
(bye)
3	San Diego	70
7	Portland	60

Semifinals; Saturday, March 3, 2012; BYUtv
1	#22 Gonzaga	83
4	Saint Mary's	78
2	BYU	64
3	San Diego	46

Championship; Monday, March 5, 2012; ESPNU
1	#22 Gonzaga	66
2	BYU	78

* Denotes Overtime Game

== Game summaries ==
wccsports.com

Feb 29
3:00 pm

Recap

Loyola Marymount Lions 66, San Francisco Dons 60
Scoring by half: 38-28, 28-32
Pts: Alex Cowling 24; Rebs: Taylor Andersen 9 Asts: Hazel Ramirez 5	Pts: Alicia Scafidi 12; Rebs: Rheina Ale 8 Asts: 2 tied with 3

Orleans Arena
Attendance: N/A
Referees: Darren Krzesnik, Michelle Russi, Karen Lasuik

BYUtv

Mar 1
12:00 pm

Recap

Pepperdine Waves 56, Loyola Marymount Lions 45
Scoring by half: 27-25, 20-29
Pts: Jazmine Jackson 20; Rebs: Jazmine Jackson 9 Asts: Lauren Bell 2	Pts: Alex Cowling 13; Rebs: Alex Cowling 6 Asts: Dani LeNior 2

Orleans Arena
Attendance: N/A
Referees: Brenda Pantoja, Darren Krzesnik, Karen Lasuik

BYUtv

Mar 1
2:30 pm

Recap

Portland Pilots 90, Santa Clara Broncos 76
Scoring by half: 44-31, 46-45
Pts: Cassandra Brown 32; Rebs: Natalie Day 12; Asts: Alexis Byrd 6	Pts: Meagan Fulps 25; Rebs: Lindsay Leo 13; Asts: Meagan Fulps 4

Orleans Arena
Attendance: N/A
Referees: Anita Ortega, Penny Davis, Cheryl Fores

BYUtv

Mar 2
12:00 pm

Recap

Saint Mary's Gaels 67, Pepperdine Waves 63
Scoring by half: 32-33, 35-30
Pts: Danielle Mauldin 17; Rebs: 2 tied with 9 Asts: Jasmine Smith 5	Pts: Lauren Bell 30; Rebs: Skye Barnett 9 Asts: Jazmine Jackson 5

Orleans Arena
Attendance: N/A
Referees: Anita Ortega, Penny Davis, Kyle Bacon

BYUtv

Mar 2
2:45 pm

Recap

San Diego Toreros 70, Portland Pilots 60
Scoring by half: 36-30, 34-30
Pts: Dominique Conners 25; Rebs: Amy Kame 7 Asts: Morgan Woodrow 6	Pts: Natalie Day 17; Rebs: Natalie Day 8 Asts: ReZine Teclemariam 2

Orleans Arena
Attendance: N/A
Referees: Melissa Barlow, Wanda Szermeta, James Morrell

BYUtv

Mar 3
12:00 pm

Recap

#22 Gonzaga Bulldogs 83, Saint Mary's Gaels 78
Scoring by half: 47-49, 36-29
Pts: Kayla Standish 31; Rebs: Kayla Standish 9 Asts: Taelor Karr 7	Pts: Jackie Nared 26; Rebs: Danielle Mauldin 12; Asts: Jackie Nared 4

Orleans Arena
Attendance: N/A
Referees: Melissa Barlow, Darren Krzesnik, Wanda Szermeta

BYUtv

Mar 3
2:30 pm

Recap

BYU Cougars 64, San Diego Toreros 46
Scoring by half: 29-21, 35-25
Pts: Lexi Eaton 26; Rebs: Kristen Riley 10; Asts: Haley Steed 8	Pts: Dominique Conners 20; Rebs: Amy Kame 9 Asts: Dominique Conners 2

Orleans Arena
Attendance: 2,341
Referees: Anita Ortega, Brenda Pantoja, Kyle Bacon

ESPNU

Mar 5
12:00 pm

Recap

#23 Gonzaga Bulldogs 66, BYU Cougars 78
Scoring by half: 35-36, 31-42
Pts: Haiden Palmer 28; Rebs: Haiden Palmer 5 Asts: Taelor Karr 5	Pts: Dani Peterson 18; Rebs: Dani Peterson 12; Asts: Kim Parker 10

Orleans Arena
Attendance: 2,941
Referees: Melissa Barlow, Brenda Pantoja, Darren Krzesnik

== All tournament conference team ==
Name	School	Pos.	Year	Ht.	Hometown
Jennifer Hamson	BYU	C	Sophomore	6' 7"	Lindon, Utah
Haiden Palmer	Gonzaga	G	Sophomore	5' 8"	Moreno Valley, California
Dani Peterson	BYU	F	Senior	6' 1"	Salt Lake City, Utah
Kayla Standish	Gonzaga	F	Senior	6' 2"	Ellensburg, Washington
Haley Steed	BYU	G	Senior	5' 4"	Syracuse, Utah

== See also ==
- 2011-12 NCAA Division I Women's basketball season
- West Coast Conference men's basketball tournament
- 2012 West Coast Conference men's basketball tournament
- 2011–12 West Coast Conference women's basketball season
- West Coast Conference women's basketball tournament
