= 2014–15 BYU Cougars women's basketball team =

Intercollegiate basketball season

2014–15 BYU Cougars women's basketball

WCC Tournament Champions

NCAA women's tournament, first round
- Conference: West Coast Conference
- Record: 23–10 (12–6 WCC)
- Head coach: Jeff Judkins (14th season)
- Assistant coaches: Melinda Bendall (4th season); Ray Stewart (4th season); Dan Nielson (2nd season)
- Home arena: Marriott Center

2014–15 West Coast Conference women's basketball standings
	Conf.				Overall
Team	W		L	PCT	W		L	PCT
Gonzaga	16	–	2	.889	26	–	8	.765
San Diego	14	–	4	.778	25	–	7	.781
Pacific	13	–	5	.722	21	–	10	.677
Saint Mary's	13	–	5	.722	23	–	11	.676
BYU †	12	–	6	.667	23	–	10	.697
San Francisco	8	–	10	.444	19	–	14	.576
Santa Clara	5	–	13	.278	11	–	18	.379
Loyola Marymount	4	–	14	.222	7	–	24	.226
Pepperdine	3	–	15	.167	8	–	22	.267
Portland	2	–	16	.111	4	–	26	.133
† Tournament winner As of March 29, 2015; Rankings from AP poll

The 2014–15 BYU Cougars women's basketball team represented Brigham Young University during the 2014–15 college basketball season. It was head coach Jeff Judkins' fourteenth season at BYU. The Cougars, members of the West Coast Conference, played their home games at the Marriott Center. They finished the season 22–10, 12–6 in WCC play to finish in fifth place. They Cougars won the WCC Tournament and earned an automatic trip to the NCAA women's tournament where they lost to Louisville in the first round.

== Before the season ==
=== Departures ===
Name	Number	Pos.	Height	Year	Hometown	Notes
Kim Beeston	4	G	5'11"	RS Senior	Heber, Utah	Graduated
Jennifer Hamson	41	C	6'7"	Senior	Lindon, Utah	Graduated, selected in 2014 WNBA draft by Los Angeles Sparks with 23rd pick.
Stephanie Rovetti	12	G	5'6"	RS Junior	Reno, Nevada	Graduated, transferred to Fresno State for senior season.

=== Recruiting ===
==== 2013-14 Class ====
The 2013-14 recruiting class information will be posted as soon as it becomes available.

==== Future Classes ====
Name	Pos.	Height	Hometown	High School	Notes
MaCayla Hanks	P	6'4"	Hyrum, Utah	Mountain Crest High School	Early commitment that will complete senior year of high school this coming season. Will join the team for the 2015-16 season.

== 2014–15 media ==
=== BYU Radio Sports Network Affiliates ===
All Lady Cougar games that don't conflict with men's basketball or football games will be featured live on BYU Radio, found nationwide on Dish Network 980, on Sirius XM 143, and online at www.byuradio.org. Home games will be a BYUtv simulcast while road games will be voiced by Robbie Bullough. Select home games and road games will air on TheW.tv.

== Roster ==
2014–15 BYU Cougars women's basketball team
Players
Coaches

Pos.	#	Name	Height	Year	Previous school	Hometown
G	1	Carly Stratton	5 ft 7 in (1.7 m)	Jr	Hurricane	St. George, UT
G	3	Ashley Garfield (C)	5 ft 10 in (1.78 m)	Sr	Morgan	Morgan, UT
F	4	Amanda Wayment	6 ft 1 in (1.85 m)	Fr	Fremont	Ogden, UT
G	11	Xojian Harry (C)	5 ft 11 in (1.8 m)	Sr	Viewmont	Bountiful, UT
G	12	Maddy Ziering-Smith	5 ft 5 in (1.65 m)	Fr	Laguna Hills	Laguna Hills, CA
G	12	Hannah Packard	5 ft 5 in (1.65 m)	So	Springville	Springville, UT
G	15	Kylie Maeda	5 ft 5 in (1.65 m)	Jr	Iolani	Honolulu, HI
G	20	Cassie Broadhead	5 ft 8 in (1.73 m)	RS Fr	Scotia Glenville	Glenville, NY
G	21	Lexi Eaton (C)	5 ft 10 in (1.78 m)	Jr	Springville	Mapleton, UT
G/F	22	Kristine Fuller	5 ft 11 in (1.8 m)	RS So	Palm Harbor University	Crystal Beach, FL
G	23	Makenzi Morrison	5 ft 8 in (1.73 m)	RS So	Alta	Draper, UT
F	25	Alohi Robins-Hardy	6 ft 2 in (1.88 m)	Fr	Kamehameha Kapalama	Waimānalo, HI
G	31	Hannah Rose	5 ft 9 in (1.75 m)	So	Southridge	Beaverton, OR
F	34	Micaelee Orton	6 ft 2 in (1.88 m)	RS So	Kearns	Kearns, UT
F	41	Morgan Bailey (C)	6 ft 2 in (1.88 m)	RS Sr	Timpanogos	Orem, UT
C	42	Savannah Irwin	6 ft 5 in (1.96 m)	RS Fr	La Costa Canyon	Carlsbad, CA
F	50	Eternity Galeai	6 ft 0 in (1.83 m)	Fr	Timpanogos	Orem, UT

Head coach

- Jeff Judkins (Utah)

Assistant coach(es)

- Melinda Bendall (BYU)
- Ray Stewart (Utah Valley)
- Dan Nielson (BYU)
- Haley Steed- Director of Operations (BYU)

Legend

- (C) Team captain
- (S) Suspended
- (I) Ineligible
- (W) Walk-on
- Injured
- Current redshirt

Roster
Last update: 2014-08-19

== Schedule ==
Date time, TV	Rank^{#}	Opponent^{#}	Result	Record	Site city, state
Exhibition
08/18/2014*		vs. Club Baloncesto Torrelodones (co-ed)	W 94–93	-	Madrid, Spain
08/21/2014*		vs. Euskadi	W 55–52	-	San Sebastián, Spain
08/22/2014*		vs. Euskadi	W 69–50	-	Bilbao, Spain
08/24/2014*		vs. Femini Santa Adria Club	W 66–49	-	Barcelona, Spain
11/01/2014*; 3:00 pm, TheW.tv		Westminster	L 54–59	-	Marriott Center; Provo, UT
11/08/2014*; 2:00 pm, TheW.tv		Ft. Lewis	W 79–43	-	Marriott Center; Provo, UT
Regular Season
11/14/2014*; 7:00 pm, Jackrabbit Extra		at South Dakota State	L 65–75	0–1	Frost Arena; Brookings, SD
11/19/2014*; 11:00 am, BYUtv		Cal State Northridge	L 54–63	0–2	Marriott Center; Provo, UT
11/22/2014*; 7:30 pm, BYUtv		Nevada	W 65–60	1–2	Marriott Center; Provo, UT
11/26/2014*; 6:00 pm		vs. Butler; Tom Weston Invitational	W 81–62	2–2	George Q. Cannon Activities Center; Laie, HI
11/27/2014*; 4:00 pm, BYUH Live		at BYU-Hawaiʻi; Tom Weston Invitational	W 73–52	3–2	George Q. Cannon Activities Center; Laie, HI
11/29/2014*; 4:00 pm		vs. No. 19/20 Oregon State; Tom Weston Invitational	L 61–71	3–3	George Q. Cannon Activities Center; Laie, HI
12/04/2014*; 7:00 pm, BYUtv		UNLV	W 76–61	4–3	Smith Fieldhouse; Provo, UT
12/06/2014*; 3:00 pm, BYUtv		vs. Colorado State	W 69–58	5–3	Energy Solutions Arena; Salt Lake City, UT
12/09/2014*; 7:00 pm, BYUtv		Weber State	W 64–53	6–3	Marriott Center; Provo, UT
12/13/2014*; 12:00 pm, P12 Mtn.		at y-Utah; Desert First Duel	W 60–56	7–3	Huntsman Center; Salt Lake City, UT
12/22/2014*; 7:00 pm, MW Net		at y-Utah State	W 62–58 ^{2OT}	8–3	Dee Glen Smith Spectrum; Logan, UT
12/27/2014; 3:00 pm, SWX & TheW.tv		at Gonzaga	L 62–78	8–4 (0–1)	McCarthey Athletic Center; Spokane, WA
12/29/2014; 8:00 pm, Portland Portal		at Portland	W 83–79	9–4 (1–1)	Chiles Center; Portland, OR
01/01/2015; 12:30 pm, BYUtv		Santa Clara	W 84–55	10–4 (2–1)	Marriott Center; Provo, UT
01/03/2015; 2:00 pm, BYUtv		San Francisco	W 65–62	11–4 (3–1)	Marriott Center; Provo, UT
01/08/2015; 8:00 pm, LMUSN		at Loyola Marymount	W 71–63	12–4 (4–1)	Gersten Pavilion; Los Angeles, CA
01/10/2015; 1:00 pm, WavesCast		at y-Pepperdine	W 84–78	13–4 (5–1)	Firestone Fieldhouse; Malibu, CA
01/15/2015; 7:00 pm, BYUtv		Pacific	W 89–72	14–4 (6–1)	Marriott Center; Provo, UT
01/17/2015; 2:00 pm, BYUtv		Saint Mary's	L 51–61	14–5 (6–2)	Marriott Center; Provo, UT
01/24/2015; 2:00 pm, BYUtv		San Diego	W 54–50	15–5 (7–2)	Marriott Center; Provo, UT
01/29/2015; 8:00 pm, TheW.tv		at San Francisco	W 68–63	16–5 (8–2)	War Memorial Gymnasium; San Francisco, CA
01/31/2015; 3:00 pm, Santa Clara Portal		at y-Santa Clara	W 58–56	17–5 (9–2)	Leavey Center; Santa Clara, CA
02/05/2015; 7:00 pm, BYUtv		Pepperdine	W 77–58	18–5 (10–2)	Marriott Center; Provo, UT
02/07/2015; 2:00 pm, TheW.tv		Loyola Marymount	W 74–59	19–5 (11–2)	Marriott Center; Provo, UT
02/12/2015; 7:00 pm, TheW.tv		at Saint Mary's	L 71–76 ^{OT}	19–6 (11–3)	McKeon Pavilion; Moraga, CA
02/14/2015; 3:00 pm, TheW.tv		at y- Pacific	L 82–86	19–7 (11–4)	Alex G. Spanos Center; Stockton, CA
02/21/2015; 3:00 pm, TheW.tv		at y- San Diego	L 59–69	19–8 (11–5)	Jenny Craig Pavilion; San Diego, CA
02/26/2015; 7:00 pm, BYUtv		Portland	W 65–63	20–8 (12–5)	Marriott Center; Provo, UT
02/28/2015; 2:00 pm, BYUtv		Gonzaga	L 66–73	20–9 (12–6)	Marriott Center; Provo, UT
2015 WCC Tournament
03/06/2015; 9:00 pm, BYUtv		vs. Saint Mary's; Quarterfinals	W 65–64	21–9	Orleans Arena; Paradise, NV
03/09/2015; 1:00 pm, BYUtv		vs. Gonzaga; Semifinals	W 61–55	22–9	Orleans Arena; Paradise, NV
03/10/2015; 2:00 pm, ESPNU		vs. z-San Francisco; Championship	W 76–65	23–9	Orleans Arena; Paradise, NV
2015 NCAA Tournament
03/21/2015*; 2:00 pm, ESPN2/ESPN3	(14)	vs. (y-3) No. 8 Louisville; First Round	L 53–86	23–10	USF Sun Dome; Tampa, FL
*Non-conference game. ^{#}Rankings from AP Poll / Coaches' Poll. (#) Tournament seedings in parentheses. All times are in Mountain.

All BYUtv games were simulcast on BYU Radio with the BYUtv announcers, listed below. Select other games, listed with an x and y, were also broadcast on BYU Radio.
y- BYU Radio road broadcasts w/ Robbie Bullough.
z- Non-BYUtv BYU Radio broadcast w/ Dave McCann & Blaine Fowler.

== Game summaries ==
=== Westminster ===
Broadcasters: Robbie Bullough & Keilani Unga
Starting Lineups:

- Westminster: Shelby Ellsworth, Amy Krommenhoek, Tia Pappas, Amanda Hacking, Alli Winters
- BYU: Ashley Garfield, Kylie Maeda, Lexi Eaton, Makenzi Morrison, Morgan Bailey

TheW.tv

Nov 1
3:00 p.m. MDT

Recap

Westminster Griffins 59, BYU Cougars 54
Scoring by half: 34-21, 25-33
Pts: Tia Pappas 16; Rebs: Tia Pappas 12; Asts: Amy Krommenhoek & Tia Pappas 5	Pts: Lexi Eaton 17; Rebs: Morgan Bailey 9 Asts: Ashley Garfield 4

Marriott Center
Provo, UT
Attendance: 625
Referees: Cathi Cornell, Brian Woods, Rigo Vasquez

=== Ft. Lewis ===
Broadcasters: Robbie Bullough & Keilani Unga
Starting Lineups:

- Ft. Lewis: Simone Ruedin, Kaile Magazzeni, Kate Bayes, Emily McCue, Kylie Santos
- BYU: Ashley Garfield, Kylie Maeda, Lexi Eaton, Makenzi Morrison, Morgan Bailey

TheW.tv

Nov 8
2:00 p.m. MST

Recap

Ft. Lewis Skyhawks 43, BYU Cougars 79
Scoring by half: 18-41, 25-38
Pts: Kylie Santos 12; Rebs: Kaile Magazzeni 7 Asts: Dallas Dickerson 2	Pts: Lexi Eaton 14; Rebs: Micaelee Orton 6 Asts: Kylie Maeda 5

Marriott Center
Provo, UT
Attendance: N/A
Referees: Anita Ortega, Cheryl Flores, Lisa Ulmer

=== South Dakota State ===
Series History: BYU leads series 1-0
Starting Lineups:

- BYU: Ashley Garfield, Kylie Maeda, Lexi Eaton, Makenzi Morrison, Morgan Bailey
- South Dakota State: Chynna Stevens, Kerri Young, Macy Miller, Megan Wayatashek, Mariah Clarin

Nov 14
8:00 p.m. CST

Recap

BYU Cougars 65, South Dakota State Jackrabbits 75
Scoring by half: 26-31, 39-44
Pts: Morgan Bailey 25; Rebs: Ashley Garfield & Morgan Bailey 8 Asts: Morgan Bailey 4	Pts: Megan Wayatashek 15; Rebs: Chynna Stevens 11; Asts: Kerri Young 5

Frost Arena
Brookins, SD
Attendance: 1,921
Referees: Shelly Nakasone, Ifeyinwa Seales, Lucy Banuelos

=== Cal State Northridge ===
Broadcasters: Spencer Linton & Kristen Kozlowski
Series History: BYU leads 4-0
Starting Lineups:

- CSUN: Janae Sharp, Camille Mahlknecht, Ashlee Guay, Cinnamon Lister, Randi Friess
- BYU: Ashley Garfield, Kylie Maeda, Lexi Eaton, Makenzi Morrison, Morgan Bailey

BYUtv

Nov 19
11:00 a.m. MST

Recap

Cal State Northridge Matadors 63, BYU Cougars 54
Scoring by half: 34-23, 29-31
Pts: Ashlee Guay 19; Rebs: Randy Friess 10; Asts: Janae Sharpe 6	Pts: Morgan Bailey 22; Rebs: Ashley Garfield 7 Asts: Ashley Garfield 5

Marriott Center
Provo, UT
Attendance: 1,370
Referees: Penny Davis, Lorena Ahumada, Bart Baldwin

=== Nevada ===
Broadcasters: Spencer Linton & Kristen Kozlowski
Series History: BYU leads series 7-1
Starting Lineups:

- Nevada: Terilyn Moe, Kelsey Kaelin, Nyasha Lesure, Emily Burns, Mimi Mungedi
- BYU: Ashley Garfield, Kylie Maeda, Lexi Eaton, Makenzi Morrison, Morgan Bailey

BYUtv

Nov 22
7:30 p.m. MST

Recap

Nevada Wolfpack 60, BYU Cougars 65
Scoring by half: 33-41, 27-24
Pts: Terilyn Moe 15; Rebs: Mimi Mungedi 10; Asts: Teriln Moe 5	Pts: Lexi Eaton 29; Rebs: Morgan Bailey 17; Asts: Kylie Maeda 4

Marriott Center
Provo, UT
Attendance: 481
Referees: Charles Gonzales, Shelley Russi, Crystal Hogan

=== Butler ===
Series History: First Meeting
Starting Lineups:

- Butler: Ijeoma Uchendu, Blaire Langlois, Sydney Buck, Lexus Murry, Laryn Goodwin
- BYU: Ashley Garfield, Kylie Maeda, Lexi Eaton, Makenzi Morrison, Morgan Bailey

Nov 26
3:00 p.m. HST

Recap

Butler Bulldogs 62, BYU Cougars 81
Scoring by half: 26-41, 36-40
Pts: Loryn Goodwin 16; Rebs: Loryn Goodwin 5 Asts: Blaire Langlois 4	Pts: Makenzi Morrison 16; Rebs: Morgan Bailey 8 Asts: Kylie Maeda 6

George Q. Cannon Activities Center
Laie, HI
Attendance: 214
Referees: Laura Rahe, Teresa Turner, Ken Sowby

=== BYU-Hawaiʻi ===
Broadcaster: Landon Southwick
Series History: BYU leads 2-0
Starting Lineups:

- BYU: Ashley Garfield, Kylie Maeda, Lexi Eaton, Makenzi Morrison, Morgan Bailey
- BYU-Hawaii: Celeste Claw, Bry Tatupu-Leopoldo, Marquessa Gilson, Emily Nelson, Whitney Fieldsted

BYUH Live Stream

Nov 27
1:00 p.m. HST

Recap

BYU Cougars 73, BYU-Hawaiʻi Seasiders 52
Scoring by half: 45-25, 28-27
Pts: Lexi Eaton 17; Rebs: Morgan Bailey 9 Asts: Kylie Maeda 5	Pts: Celeste Claw 18; Rebs: Celeste Claw 6 Asts: Celeste Claw 6

George Q. Cannon Activities Center
Laie, HI
Attendance: 193
Referees: Tim Tomashiro, Tiki Kahoano, Clayton Tang

=== Oregon State ===
Series History: Oregon State leads series 5-4
Starting Lineups:

- Oregon State: Ali Gibson, Jamie Weisner, Sydney Weise, Deven Hunter, Ruth Hamblin
- BYU: Ashley Garfield, Kylie Maeda, Lexi Eaton, Makenzi Morrison, Morgan Bailey

Nov 29
1:00 p.m. HST

Recap

Oregon State Beavers 71, BYU Cougars 61
Scoring by half: 34-29, 37-32
Pts: Jamie Weisner 20; Rebs: Ruth Hamblin 15; Asts: Sydney Weise 6	Pts: Morgan Bailey 26; Rebs: Morgan Bailey 9 Asts: Kylie Maeda & Lexi Eaton 4

George Q. Cannon Activities Center
Laie, HI
Attendance: 113
Referees: Laura Rahe, Ken Sowby, Teresa Turner

=== UNLV ===
Broadcasters: Dave McCann & Kristen Kozlowski
Series History: BYU leads series 28-12
Starting Lineups:

- UNLV: Nikki Wheatley, Aley Rohde, Diamond Major, Alana Cesarz, Danielle Miller
- BYU: Ashley Garfield, Kylie Maeda, Lexi Eaton, Makenzi Morrison, Morgan Bailey

BYUtv

Dec 4
7:00 p.m. MST

Recap

UNLV Lady Rebels 61, BYU Cougars 76
Scoring by half: 25-39, 36-37
Pts: Alana Cesarz 24; Rebs: Alana Cesarz 11; Asts: Brooke Johnson, Alana Cesarz, Danielle Miller, & Briana Charles 2	Pts: Lexi Eaton 19; Rebs: Ashley Garfield 15; Asts: Kylie Maeda 8

Smith Fieldhouse
Provo, UT
Attendance: 767
Referees: Kyle Bacon, Teresa Turner, Janetta Graham

=== Colorado State ===
Broadcasters: Spencer Linton & Blaine Fowler
Series History: BYU leads series 53-22
Starting Lineups:

- Colorado State: Gritt Ryder, Ellen Nystrom, Emilie Hesseldal, Elin Gustavsson, Keyora Wharry
- BYU: Ashley Garfield, Kylie Maeda, Lexi Eaton, Makenzi Morrison, Morgan Bailey

BYUtv

Dec 6
2:00 p.m. MST

Recap

Colorado State Rams 58, BYU Cougars 69
Scoring by half: 25-33, 33-36
Pts: Gritt Ryder 13; Rebs: Emilie Hesseldal 7 Asts: Gritt Ryder 6	Pts: Lexi Eaton 30; Rebs: Lexi Eaton 13; Asts: Kylie Maeda 5

Energy Solutions Arena
Salt Lake City, UT
Attendance: 450
Referees: Brenda Pantoja, Benny Luna, Alex Carroll

=== Weber State ===
Broadcasters: Spencer Linton & Kristen Kozlowski
Series History: BYU leads series 41-9
Starting Lineups:

- Weber State: Jalen Carpenter, Kailie Quinn, Zakiyyah Shahid-Martin, Brittney Dunbar, Regina Okoye
- BYU: Ashley Garfield, Kylie Maeda, Lexi Eaton, Makenzi Morrison, Morgan Bailey

BYUtv

Dec 9
7:00 p.m. MST

Recap

Weber State Wildcats 53, BYU Cougars 64
Scoring by half: 20-29, 33-35
Pts: Jocelyn Adams 12; Rebs: Jalen Carpenter & Jocelyn Adams 11; Asts: Brittney Dunbar 4	Pts: Morgan Bailey 28; Rebs: Lexi Eaton 9 Asts: Ashley Garfield, Lexi Eaton, & Cassie Broadhead 3

Marriott Center
Provo, UT
Attendance: 445
Referees: Melissa Barlow, Darren Krzesnik, Brittany Groves

=== Utah ===
Broadcasters: Anne Marie Anderson & Mary Murphy
Series History: Utah leads series 62-40
Starting Lineups:

- BYU: Ashley Garfield, Kylie Maeda, Lexi Eaton, Makenzi Morrison, Morgan Bailey
- Utah: Taryn Wicijowski, Paige Crozon, Danielle Rodriguez, Tanaeya Boclair, Joeseta Fatuesi

P12 Mtn.

Dec 13
12:00 p.m. MST

Recap

BYU Cougars 60, Utah Utes 56
Scoring by half: 32-29, 28-27
Pts: Morgan Bailey 18; Rebs: Morgan Bailey 10; Asts: Ashley Garfield & Kylie Maeda 5	Pts: Taryn Wicijowski 15; Rebs: Taryn Wicijowski 13; Asts: Taryn Wicijowski 7

Huntsman Center
Salt Lake City, UT
Attendance: 1,159
Referees: Michael Price, Michol Murray, Penny Davis

=== Utah State ===
Broadcaster: Craig Hislop
Series History: BYU leads series 32-3
Starting Lineups:

- BYU: Ashley Garfield, Kylie Maeda, Lexi Eaton, Makenzi Morrison, Morgan Bailey
- Utah State: Elise Nelson, Funda Nakkasoglu, Tilar Clark, Hannah Hutchins, Franny Vaaulu

MWN

Dec 22
7:00 p.m. MST

Recap

BYU Cougars 62, Utah State Aggies 58 (OT)
Scoring by half: 23-18, 27-32 Overtime: 2-2, 10-6
Pts: Lexi Eaton 29; Rebs: Morgan Bailey 22; Asts: Lexi Eaton 4	Pts: Funda Nakkasoglu 19; Rebs: Elise Nelson 11; Asts: Elise Nelson 3

Dee Glen Smith Spectrum
Logan, UT
Attendance: 800
Referees: Lisa Jones, Michael Price, Bob Scofield

=== Gonzaga ===
Broadcasters: Greg Heister & Michelle Clark
Series History: Gonzaga leads series 9-6
Starting Lineups:

- BYU: Ashley Garfield, Kylie Maeda, Lexi Eaton, Makenzi Morrison, Morgan Bailey
- Gonzaga: Georgia Stirton, Sunny Greinacher, Keani Albanez, Elle Tinkle, Shleby Cheslek

SWX
TheW.tv

Dec 27
2:00 p.m. PST

Recap

BYU Cougars 62, Gonzaga Bulldogs 78
Scoring by half: 34-45, 28-33
Pts: Lexi Eaton & Morgan Bailey 13; Rebs: Ashley Garfield & Xojain Harry 7 Asts: Kylie Maeda 4	Pts: Keani Albanez 20; Rebs: Sunny Greinacher 8 Asts: Georgia Stirton 5

McCarthey Athletic Center
Spokane, WA
Attendance: 5,911
Referees: Charles Gonzales, Karen Lasuik, In'fini Robinson

=== Portland ===
Broadcaster: Cody Barton & Lindsay Gregg
Series History: BYU leads series 14-4
Starting Lineups:

- BYU: Ashley Garfield, Kylie Maeda, Lexi Eaton, Makenzi Morrison, Morgan Bailey
- Portland: Cassandra Brown, Kari Luttinen, Cassandra Thompson, Jasmine Wooton, Sara Zaragoza

Portland Portal

Dec 29
7:00 p.m. PST

Recap

BYU Cougars 83, Portland Pilots 79
Scoring by half: 28-37, 55-42
Pts: Morgan Bailey 31; Rebs: Morgan Bailey 11; Asts: Kylie Maeda 6	Pts: Kari Luttinen 22; Rebs: Cassandra Thompson 7 Asts: Jasmine Wooton 9

Chiles Center
Portland, OR
Attendance: 339
Referees: Daren Krzesnik, Kenneth Nash, Steve Belnap

=== Santa Clara ===
Broadcasters: Spencer Linton & Kristen Kozlowski
Series History: BYU leads series 8-1
Starting Lineups:

- Santa Clara: Beth Carlson, Nici Gilday, Marie Bertholdt, Raquel Avila, Brooke Galloway
- BYU: Ashley Garfield, Kylie Maeda, Lexi Eaton, Makenzi Morrison, Morgan Bailey

BYUtv

Jan 1
12:30 p.m. MST

Recap

Santa Clara Broncos 55, BYU Cougars 84
Scoring by half: 25-40, 30-44
Pts: Raquel Avila & Emily Wolph 11; Rebs: Taylor Berry 8 Asts: Raquel Avila 3	Pts: Lexi Eaton 22; Rebs: Morgan Bailey 14; Asts: Morgan Bailey 7

Marriott Center
Provo, UT
Attendance: 693
Referees: Kyle Bacon, Tiffany Bird, Renee Robinson

=== San Francisco ===
Broadcaster: Spencer Linton & Kristen Kozlowski
Series History: BYU leads series 10-2
Starting Lineups:

- San Francisco: Zhane Dikes, Taj Winston, Paige Spietz, Rachel Howard, Taylor Proctor
- BYU: Ashley Garfield, Kylie Maeda, Lexi Eaton, Makenzi Morrison, Morgan Bailey

BYUtv

Jan 3
2:00 p.m. MST

Recap

San Francisco Dons 62, BYU Cougars 65
Scoring by half: 35-33, 27-32
Pts: Taylor Proctor 20; Rebs: Paige Spietz 10; Asts: Zhane Dikes 6	Pts: Morgan Bailey 26; Rebs: Morgan Bailey & Ashley Garfield 12; Asts: Kylie Maeda & Xojian Harry 4

Marriott Center
Provo, UT
Attendance: 622
Referees: Rick Showers, Janetta Graham, Rigo Vasquez

=== Loyola Marymount ===
Broadcasters: Derek Georgino
Series History: BYU leads series 8-1
Starting Lineups:

- BYU: Ashley Garfield, Kylie Maeda, Lexi Eaton, Makenzi Morrison, Morgan Bailey
- LMU: Emily Ben-Jumbo, Sophie Taylor, Taylor Anderson, Leslie Lopez-Wood, Makenzie Cast

LMUSN

Jan 8
7:00 p.m. PST

Recap

BYU Cougars 71, Loyola Marymount Lions 63
Scoring by half: 23-28, 48-35
Pts: Morgan Bailey 22; Rebs: Morgan Bailey 16; Asts: Kylie Maeda 7	Pts: Makenzie Cast 16; Rebs: Sophie Taylor 8 Asts: Taylor Anderson 6

Gersten Pavilion
Los Angeles, CA
Attendance: 875
Referees: Lisa Jones, Teresa Turner, Lucy Banuelos

=== Pepperdine ===
Broadcaster: Josh Perigo
Series History: BYU leads series 8-2
Starting Lineups:

- BYU: Xojian Harry, Kylie Maeda, Lexi Eaton, Makenzi Morrison, Morgan Bailey
- Pepperdine: Bria Richardson, Ea Shoushtari, Krista Pettepier, Olivia Ogwumike, Keitra Wallace

WavesCast

Jan 10
12:05 p.m. PST

Recap

BYU Cougars 84, Pepperdine Waves 78
Scoring by half: 33-31, 51-47
Pts: Lexi Eaton 29; Rebs: Morgan Bailey 14; Asts: Kylie Maeda 5 Makeni Morrison 7/7 from 3	Pts: Bria Richardson & Allie Green 24; Rebs: Keitra Wallace 8 Asts: Ea Shoushtari 6

Firestone Fieldhouse
Malibu, CA
Attendance: 212
Referees: Cathi Cornell, Cheryl Flores, Alecia Murray

=== Pacific ===
Broadcasters: Spencer Linton, Kristen Kozlowski, & Andy Boyce
Series History: BYU leads series 7-2
Starting Lineups:

- Pacific: Kristina Johnson, Kendall Kenyon, Madison Parrish, Unique Coleman, Hailie Eackles
- BYU: Xojian Harry, Kylie Maeda, Lexi Eaton, Makenzi Morrison, Morgan Bailey

BYUtv

Jan 15
7 p.m. MST

Recap

Pacific Tigers 72, BYU Cougars 89
Scoring by half: 34-45, 38-44
Pts: Geanna Luaulu-Summers 18; Rebs: Kendall Kenyon 8 Asts: Kristina Johnson & Geanna Luaulu-Summers 4	Pts: Lexi Eaton 32; Rebs: Morgan Bailey 11; Asts: Kylie Maeda 9

Marriott Center
Provo, UT
Attendance: 498
Referees: Brenda Pantoja, Karen Lasuik, Paul Patterson

=== Saint Mary's ===
Broadcaster: Dave McCann, Kristen Kozlowski, & Andy Boyce
Series History: BYU leads series 4-3
Starting Lineups:

- Saint Mary's: Lauren Nicholson, Hayley Hendricksen, Shannon Mauldin, Stella Beck, Carli Rosenthal
- BYU: Xojian Harry, Kylie Maeda, Lexi Eaton, Makenzi Morrison, Morgan Bailey

BYUtv

Jan 17
2 p.m. MST

Saint Mary's Gaels 61, BYU Cougars 51
Scoring by half: 24-31, 37-20
Pts: Lauren Nicholson 20; Rebs: Lauren Nicholson 11; Asts: Lauren Nicholson 4	Pts: Lexi Eaton & Morgan Bailey 17; Rebs: Morgan Bailey 10; Asts: Kylie Maeda 3

Marriott Center
Provo, UT
Attendance: 797
Referees: Kyle Bacon, Benny Luna, Robert Scofield

=== San Diego ===
Broadcasters: Dave McCann, Kristen Kozlowski, & Andy Boyce
Series History: BYU leads series 7-1
Starting Lineups:

- San Diego: Malina Hood, Katelyn McDaniel, Sophia Ederaine, Maya Hood, Cori Woodward
- BYU: Xojian Harry, Kylie Maeda, Lexi Eaton, Makenzi Morrison, Morgan Bailey

BYUtv

Jan 24
2 p.m. MST

Recap

San Diego Toreros 50, BYU Cougars 54
Scoring by half: 21-30, 29-24
Pts: Malina Hood & Sophia Ederaine 14; Rebs: Sophia Ederaine 13; Asts: Malina Hood 3	Pts: Lexi Eaton 16; Rebs: Morgan Bailey 8 Asts: Morgan Bailey 6

Marriott Center
Provo, UT
Attendance: 690
Referees: Penny Davis, In'Fini Robinson, Felecity Willis

=== San Francisco ===
Broadcaster: George Devine
Series History: BYU leads series 11-2
Starting Lineups:

- BYU: Xojian Harry, Kylie Maeda, Lexi Eaton, Makenzi Morrison, Morgan Bailey
- San Francisco: Zhane Dikes, Taj Winston, Paige Spietz, Aundrea Gordon, Taylor Proctor

TheW.tv

Jan 29
7 p.m. PST

Recap

BYU Cougars 68, San Francisco Dons 63
Scoring by half: 31-27, 37-36
Pts: Morgan Bailey 19; Rebs: Morgan Bailey 11; Asts: Makenzi Morrison 5	Pts: Taj Winston 19; Rebs: Taylor Proctor 9 Asts: Zhane Dikes 2

War Memorial Gymnasium
San Francisco, CA
Attendance: 221
Referees: Cathi Cornell, Wanda Szeremeta, Deon Lewis

=== Santa Clara ===
Series History: BYU leads series 9-1
Starting Lineups:

- BYU: Xojian Harry, Kylie Maeda, Lexi Eaton, Makenzi Morrison, Morgan Bailey
- Santa Clara: Taylor Berry, Nici Gilday, Marie Bertholdt, Courtney Lisowski, Raquel Avila

SCU Portal

Jan 31
2 p.m. PST

Recap

BYU Cougars 58, Santa Clara Broncos 56
Scoring by half: 23-30, 35-26
Pts: Lexi Eaton 27; Rebs: Lexi Eaton 13; Asts: Xojian Harry & Makenzi Morrison 3	Pts: Nici Gilday 22; Rebs: Marie Bertholdt, Maddison Allen, & Vanessa Leo 8 Asts: Raquel Avila 5

Leavey Center
Santa Clara, CA
Attendance: 315
Referees: Anita Orega, Rigo Vasquez, Alex Carroll

=== Pepperdine ===
Broadcaster: Spencer Linton & Kristen Kozlowski
Series History: BYU leads series 9-2
Starting Lineups:

- Pepperdine: Bria Richardson, Ea Shoushtari, Allie Green, Olivia Ogwumike, Keitra Wallace
- BYU: Xojian Harry, Kylie Maeda, Lexi Eaton, Makenzi Morrison, Morgan Bailey

BYUtv

Feb 5
7 p.m. MST

Recap

Pepperdine Waves 58, BYU Cougars 77
Scoring by half: 26-36, 32-41
Pts: Bria Richardson 15; Rebs: Ea Shoushtari 8 Asts: Bria Richardson 5	Pts: Lexi Eaton 37; Rebs: Lexi Eaton 14; Asts: Kylie Maeda 8 Jeff Judkins 300th coaching win

Marriott Center
Provo, UT
Attendance: 585
Referees: Robert Scofield, Lorena Ahumada, Tiffany Jump

=== Loyola Marymount ===
Broadcasters: Robbie Bullough & Keilani Unga
Series History: BYU leads series 9-1
Starting Lineups:

- LMU: Emily Ben-Jumbo, Sophie Taylor, Olivia Lucero, Leslie Lopez-Wood, Makenzie Cast
- BYU: Xojian Harry, Kylie Maeda, Lexi Eaton, Makenzi Morrison, Morgan Bailey

TheW.tv

Feb 7
2 p.m. MST

Recap

Loyola Marymount Lions 59, BYU Cougars 74
Scoring by half: 26-41, 33-33
Pts: Emily Ben-Jumbo & Leslie Lopez-Wood 16; Rebs: Emily Ben-Jumbo 5 Asts: Olivia Lucero 4	Pts: Lexi Eaton 24; Rebs: Morgan Bailey 12; Asts: Kylie Maeda & Makenzi Morrison 6

Marriott Center
Provo, UT
Attendance: 748
Referees: Michol Murray, Gordon Torigoe, Tyler Trimble

=== Saint Mary's ===
Broadcaster: Elias Feldman
Series History: Series even 4-4
Starting Lineups:

- BYU: Xojian Harry, Kylie Maeda, Lexi Eaton, Makenzi Morrison, Morgan Bailey
- Saint Mary's: Lauren Nicholson, Hayley Hendricksen, Shannon Mauldin, Stella Beck, Carli Rosenthal

TheW.tv

Feb 12
6 p.m. PST

Recap

BYU Cougars 71, Saint Mary's Gaels 76 (OT)
Scoring by half: 38-32, 26-39 Overtime: 7-12
Pts: Lexi Eaton 23; Rebs: Morgan Bailey 15; Asts: Kylie Maeda & Morgan Bailey 6	Pts: Shannon Mauldin 21; Rebs: Carli Rosenthal 11; Asts: Shannon Mauldin 7

McKeon Pavilion
Moraga, CA
Attendance: 295
Referees: Melissa Barlow, Michelle Russi, Brian Woods

=== Pacific ===
Broadcaster: Don Gubbins
Series History: BYU leads series 8-2
Starting Lineups:

- BYU: Xojian Harry, Kylie Maeda, Lexi Eaton, Makenzi Morrison, Morgan Bailey
- Pacific: Kristina Johnson, Kendall Kenyon, Madison Parrish, Erin Butler, Hailie Eackles

TheW.tv

Feb 14
2:05 p.m. PST

Recap

BYU Cougars 82, Pacific Tigers 86
Scoring by half: 37-42, 45-44
Pts: Lexi Eaton 29; Rebs: Morgan Bailey 11; Asts: Morgan Bailey 6	Pts: Hailie Eackles 17; Rebs: Kendall Kenyon 13; Asts: Kristina Johnson 5

Alex G. Spanos Center
Stockton, CA
Attendance: 524
Referees: Laren Lasuik, In'Fini Robinson, Tiffany Jump

=== San Diego ===
Broadcasters: Paula Bott & Susie Erpelding-Barosso
Series History: BYU leads series 8-1
Starting Lineups:

- BYU: Xojian Harry, Kylie Maeda, Lexi Eaton, Makenzi Morrison, Morgan Bailey
- San Diego: Malina Hood, Katelyn McDaniel, Sophia Ederaine, Maya Hood, Cori Woodward

TheW.tv

Feb 21
2 p.m. PST

Recap

BYU Cougars 59, San Diego Toreros 69
Scoring by half: 22-22, 37-47
Pts: Lexi Eaton 24; Rebs: Lexi Eaton 6 Asts: Lexi Eaton 5	Pts: Sophia Ederaine 28; Rebs: Sophia Ederaine & Maya Hood 10; Asts: Katherine Hamilton 4

Jenny Craig Pavilion
San Diego, CA
Attendance: 698
Referees: Brenda Pantoja, Rick Showers, Alex Carroll

=== Portland ===
Broadcaster: Spencer Linton, Kristen Kozlowski, & Andy Boyce
Series History: BYU leads series 15-4
Starting Lineups:

- Portland: Kaylie Van Loo, Cassandra Brown, Kari Luttinen, Cassandra Thompson, Jasmine Wooton
- BYU: Xojian Harry, Kylie Maeda, Lexi Eaton, Makenzi Morrison, Morgan Bailey

BYUtv

Feb 26
7 p.m. MST

Recap

Portland Pilots 63, BYU Cougars 65
Scoring by half: 29-32, 34-33
Pts: Cassandra Brown 19; Rebs: Cassandra Thompson 8 Asts: Cassandra Thompson 5	Pts: Morgan Bailey 17; Rebs: Morgan Bailey 12; Asts: Lexi Eaton 6

Marriott Center
Provo, UT
Attendance: 858
Referees: Wanda Szeremata, Richard Waters, Alejandro Morena

=== Gonzaga ===
Broadcasters: Dave McCann & Kristen Kozlowski
Series History: Gonzaga leads series 10-6
Starting Lineups:

- Gonzaga: Georgia Stirton, Sunny Greinacher, Keani Albanez, Elle Tinkle, Shelby Cheslek
- BYU: Ashley Garfield, Kylie Maeda, Lexi Eaton, Makenzi Morrison, Morgan Bailey

BYUtv

Feb 28
2 p.m. MST

Recap

Gonzaga Bulldogs 73, BYU Cougars 66
Scoring by half: 34-28, 39-38
Pts: Elle Tinkle 20; Rebs: Sunny Greinacher 5 Asts: Georgia Striton 7	Pts: Makenzi Morrison 20; Rebs: Morgan Bailey 9 Asts: Lexi Eaton 4

Marriott Center
Provo, UT
Attendance: 1,226
Referees: Melissa Barlow, Ifeyinwa Seales, Rigoberto Vasquez

=== WCC Quarter: Saint Mary's ===
Broadcasters: Dave McCann & Blaine Fowler
Series History: Saint Mary's leads series 5-4
Starting Lineups:

- BYU: Xojian Harry, Kylie Maeda, Lexi Eaton, Makenzi Morrison, Morgan Bailey
- Saint Mary's: Lauren Nicholson, Hayley Hendricksen, Shannon Mauldin, Stella Beck, Carli Rosenthal

BYUtv

Mar 5
8 p.m. PST

Recap

BYU Cougars 65, Saint Mary's Gaels 64
Scoring by half: 28-30, 37-34
Pts: Lexi Eaton 30; Rebs: Morgan Bailey 9 Asts: Kylie Maeda & Lexi Eaton 2	Pts: Lauren Nicholson 23; Rebs: Carli Rosenthal 12; Asts: Lauren Nicholson & Shannon Mauldin 1

Orleans Arena
Paradise, NV
Attendance: 7,110
Referees: Rich Waters, Benny Luna, Karen Lasuik

=== WCC Semi: Gonzaga ===
Broadcasters: Dave McCann & Blaine Fowler
Series History: Gonzaga leads series 11-6
Starting Lineups:

- BYU: Xojian Harry, Kylie Maeda, Lexi Eaton, Makenzi Morrison, Morgan Bailey
- Gonzaga: Georgia Stirton, Sunny Greinacher, Keani Albanez, Elle Tinkle, Shelby Cheslek

BYUtv

Mar 9
12 p.m. PDT

Recap

BYU Cougars 61, Gonzaga Bulldogs 55
Scoring by half: 22-32, 39-23
Pts: Makenzi Morrison 18; Rebs: Morgan Bailey 9 Asts: Kylie Maeda 6	Pts: Sunny Greinacher 15; Rebs: Sunny Greinacher 12; Asts: Georgia Stirton 6

Orleans Arena
Paradise, NV
Attendance: 7,110
Referees: Darren Krzesnik, Brian Woods, In'Fini Robinson

=== WCC Championship: San Francisco ===
Broadcasters: Beth Mowins & Katie Smith
Series History: BYU leads series 12-2
Starting Lineups:

- San Francisco: Zhane Dikes, Taj Winston, Paige Spietz, Aundrea Gordon, Taylor Proctor
- BYU: Xojian Harry, Kylie Maeda, Lexi Eaton, Makenzi Morrison, Morgan Bailey

ESPNU

Mar 10
1 p.m. PDT

Recap

San Francisco Dons 65, BYU Cougars 76
Scoring by half: 27-39, 38-37
Pts: Taj Winston 24; Rebs: Taj Winston & Paige Spietz 10; Asts: Zhane Dikes & Taylor Proctor 3	Pts: Lexi Eaton 22; Rebs: Morgan Bailey 8 Asts: Kylie Maeda 5

Orleans Arena
Paradise, NV
Attendance: 8,000
Referees: Robert Scofield, Anita Ortega, Michol Murray

=== NCAA 64: Louisville ===
Broadcasters: Bob Picozzi & Brooke Weisbrod
Series History: Louisville leads series 1-0
Starting Lineups:

- BYU: Xojian Harry, Kylie Maeda, Lexi Eaton, Makenzi Morrison, Morgan Bailey
- Louisville: Myisha Hines-Allen, Jude Schimmel, Mariya Moore, Sara Hammond, Sheronne Vails

ESPN2

Mar 21
4 p.m. EDT

Recap

BYU Cougars 53, Louisville Cardinals 86
Scoring by half: 24-38, 29-48
Pts: Morgan Bailey 15; Rebs: Morgan Bailey 10; Asts: Cassie Broadhead 4	Pts: Myisha Hines-Allen 19; Rebs: Myisha Hines-Allen 8 Asts: Arica Carter 5

Sun Dome
Tampa, FL
Attendance: 5,560
Referees: Brenda Pantoja, Brian Garland, Joe Cunningham

== Rankings ==
Regular season polls
Poll	Pre- Season	Week 1	Week 2	Week 3	Week 4	Week 5	Week 6	Week 7	Week 8	Week 9	Week 10	Week 11	Week 12	Week 13	Week 14	Week 15	Week 16	Week 17	Week 18	Week 19 Postseason	Final
AP	RV																				
Coaches	RV	RV																			

Legend
	Increase in ranking
	Decrease in ranking
	Not ranked previous week
(RV)	Received Votes

== See also ==
- BYU Cougars women's basketball
