= West Coast Conference women's basketball tournament =

- Conference basketball championship
- Sport: College basketball
- Conference: West Coast Conference
- Number of teams: 11
- Format: Single-elimination tournament
- Current stadium: Orleans Arena
- Current location: Las Vegas, Nevada
- Played: 1992-present
- Last contest: 2026
- Current champion: Gonzaga Bulldogs
- Most championships: Gonzaga Bulldogs (11)
- TV partner(s): BYUtv, ESPNU
- Official website: WCCSports.com Women's Basketball

Sponsors
- University Credit Union (2019)

The West Coast Conference women's basketball tournament is the annual concluding tournament for the NCAA college basketball in the West Coast Conference. The winner receives an automatic berth into the NCAA Women's Basketball Championship. The championship is broadcast nationally on ESPNU.

Games were at campus sites from 1992 to 1994, then were played at the same location as the men's tournament, beginning in 1995.

Beginning in 2012, the WCC adopted a new format to incorporate a ninth team (BYU). In 2012 and 2013, the tournament started on Wednesday instead of Friday, and a first round 8 vs. 9 game was added. The winner of the 8/9 game played the 5 seed on Day 2 of the Tournament (Thursday). The 6 vs. 7 match took place that same day. Day 3, or the Quarterfinals (Friday), featured the winner of the 5/8/9 game playing the 4 seed and the winner of the 6/7 game playing the 3 seed. The top two seeds entered in the semifinals on Saturday. All teams were off on Sunday (all full WCC members are private, faith-based schools, and BYU, which had been a member from 2011 to 2023, has a strict policy against Sunday play), and the championship game was played Monday on ESPNU. BYUtv Sports showed all games on the women's side except for the championship.

The format changed to a traditional 10-team tournament with the addition of Pacific for the 2013–14 season.

At the end of each tournament, an all-tournament team is named, with one individual selected as Most Valuable Player. Four players have earned MVP honors more than once—Valerie Gillom of San Francisco, Jill Barta of Gonzaga, and Alex Fowler of Portland twice each; and Gonzaga's Courtney Vandersloot three times.

== Past WCC women's basketball tournament results ==
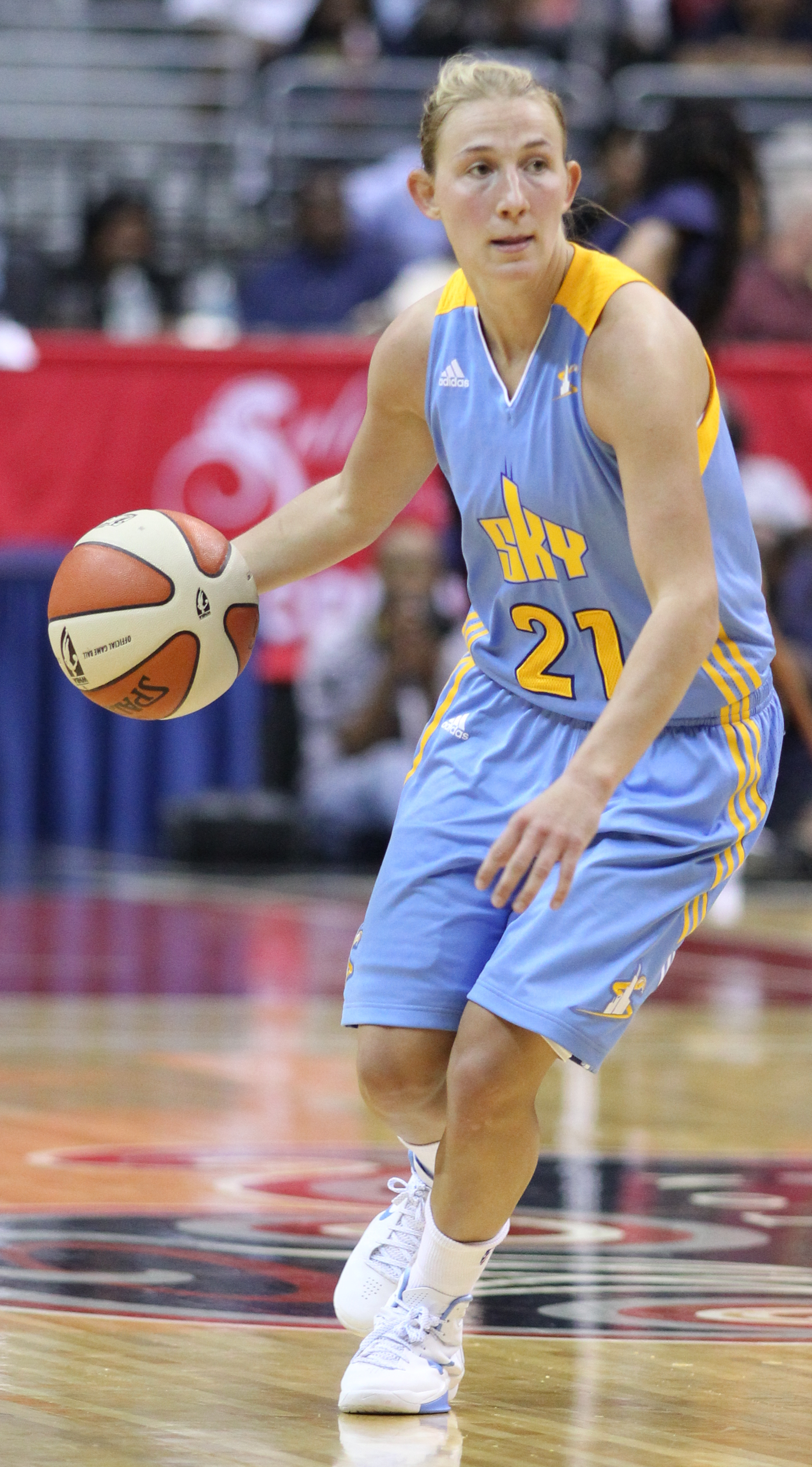
Gonzaga's Courtney Vandersloot, the only three-time tournament MVP, is also the WCC's only three-time Player of the Year.

Year	Champion	Runner-up	Venue	Tournament MVP
1992	Santa Clara	San Francisco	Toso Pavilion, Santa Clara, California	Melissa King, Santa Clara
1993	San Diego	Santa Clara	Toso Pavilion, Santa Clara, California	Jill Shaver, San Diego
1994	Portland	Gonzaga	Toso Pavilion, Santa Clara, California	Amy Claboe, Portland
1995	San Francisco	Portland	Toso Pavilion, Santa Clara, California	Valerie Gillon, San Francisco
1996	San Francisco	Portland	Toso Pavilion, Santa Clara, California	Valerie Gillon, San Francisco
1997	San Francisco	Portland	Gersten Pavilion, Los Angeles, California	Brittany Lindhe, San Francisco
1998	Santa Clara	Saint Mary's	Toso Pavilion, Santa Clara, California	Lisa Sacco, Santa Clara
1999	Saint Mary's	Pepperdine	Toso Pavilion, Santa Clara, California	Tracy Morris, Saint Mary's
2000	San Diego	Pepperdine	Toso Pavilion, Santa Clara, California	Jessica Gray, San Diego
2001	Saint Mary's	Loyola Marymount	Jenny Craig Pavilion, San Diego, California	Jermisha Dosty, Saint Mary's
2002	Pepperdine	Santa Clara	Jenny Craig Pavilion, San Diego, California	Damaris Hinojosa, Pepperdine
2003	Pepperdine	Santa Clara	Jenny Craig Pavilion, San Diego, California	Kendra Rhea, Santa Clara
2004	Loyola Marymount	Gonzaga	Leavey Center, Santa Clara, California	Adrianne Slaughter, Loyola Marymount
2005	Santa Clara	Gonzaga	Leavey Center, Santa Clara, California	Michelle Cozad, Santa Clara
2006	Pepperdine	Santa Clara	McCarthey Athletic Center, Spokane, Washington	Daphanie Kennedy, Pepperdine
2007	Gonzaga	Loyola Marymount	Chiles Center, Portland, Oregon	Heather Bowman, Gonzaga
2008	San Diego	Gonzaga	Jenny Craig Pavilion, San Diego, California	Amanda Rego, San Diego
2009	Gonzaga	San Diego	Orleans Arena, Paradise, Nevada	Courtney Vandersloot, Gonzaga
2010	Gonzaga	Pepperdine	Orleans Arena, Paradise, Nevada	Courtney Vandersloot, Gonzaga
2011	Gonzaga	Saint Mary's	Orleans Arena, Paradise, Nevada	Courtney Vandersloot, Gonzaga
2012	BYU	Gonzaga	Orleans Arena, Paradise, Nevada	Haley Steed, BYU
2013	Gonzaga	San Diego	Orleans Arena, Paradise, Nevada	Haiden Palmer, Gonzaga
2014	Gonzaga	BYU	Orleans Arena, Paradise, Nevada	Sunny Greinacher, Gonzaga
2015	BYU	San Francisco	Orleans Arena, Paradise, Nevada	Lexi Eaton, BYU
2016	San Francisco	BYU	Orleans Arena, Paradise, Nevada	Taylor Proctor, San Francisco
2017	Gonzaga	Saint Mary's	Orleans Arena, Paradise, Nevada	Jill Barta, Gonzaga
2018	Gonzaga	San Diego	Orleans Arena, Paradise, Nevada	Jill Barta, Gonzaga
2019	BYU	Gonzaga	Orleans Arena, Paradise, Nevada	Paisley Johnson, BYU
2020	Portland	San Diego	Orleans Arena, Paradise, Nevada	Alex Fowler, Portland
2021	Gonzaga	BYU	Orleans Arena, Paradise, Nevada	Jill Townsend, Gonzaga
2022	Gonzaga	BYU	Orleans Arena, Paradise, Nevada	Melody Kempton, Gonzaga
2023	Portland	Gonzaga	Orleans Arena, Paradise, Nevada	Alex Fowler, Portland
2024	Portland	Gonzaga	Orleans Arena, Paradise, Nevada	Kennedy Dickie, Portland
2025	Oregon State	Portland	Orleans Arena, Paradise, Nevada	Catarina Ferreira, Oregon State
2026	Gonzaga	Oregon State	Orleans Arena, Paradise, Nevada	Lauren Whittaker, Gonzaga

== Performance by school ==
Former WCC members, as of the next WCC season in 2026–27, highlighted in pink.

School	Championships	Championship Years
Gonzaga	11	2007, 2009, 2010, 2011, 2013, 2014, 2017, 2018, 2021, 2022, 2026
Portland	4	1994, 2020, 2023, 2024
San Francisco	4	1995, 1996, 1997, 2016
BYU	3	2012, 2015, 2019
San Diego	3	1993, 2000, 2008
Pepperdine	3	2002, 2003, 2006
Santa Clara	3	1992, 1998, 2005
Saint Mary's	2	1999, 2001
Loyola Marymount	1	2004
Oregon State	1	2025
Pacific	0	
Washington State	0	
Seattle	0	

Denver will play its first WCC season in 2026–27, with UC San Diego following in 2027–28.

== See also ==
- West Coast Conference men's basketball tournament
