= Jasmine Smith =

Jasmine Smith may refer to:

- Jasmine Curtis-Smith, actress
- Jasmine Smith, played in 2011–12 West Coast Conference women's basketball season
