= Lee Cummard =

American basketball player (born 1985)

BYU Cougars
- Title: Head coach
- League: Big 12 Conference

Personal information
- Born: March 31, 1985 (age 41) Mesa, Arizona, U.S.

Career information
- High school: Mesa (Mesa, Arizona)
- College: BYU (2005–2009)
- NBA draft: 2009: undrafted
- Playing career: 2009–2016
- Position: Small forward / shooting guard
- Number: 24, 8
- Coaching career: 2016–present

Career history

Playing
- 2009–2010: Utah Flash
- 2010–2011: Fos-sur-Mer
- 2011–2012: Kyoto Hannaryz
- 2012–2013: Fos-sur-Mer
- 2013–2016: Okapi Aalstar

Coaching
- 2016–2018: BYU (men's graduate assistant)
- 2018–2019: BYU (men's assistant)
- 2019–2025: BYU (women's assistant)
- 2025–present: BYU (women's)

Career highlights
- MWC co-Player of the Year (2008); 2x First-team All-MWC (2008, 2009)

Lee Cummard (born March 31, 1985) is an American basketball coach and former player who is head coach of the Brigham Young University (BYU) women's basketball team. Cummard served as an assistant coach for both the men's and women's teams at BYU before being named head coach of the women's team in 2025. Prior to his career in coaching, Cummard was a player himself, appearing in all 131 games BYU played during his four seasons in Provo, and then playing at the professional and minor league levels in the United States and in other countries.

== Playing career ==
Cummard was born and raised in Mesa, Arizona, where he attended Mesa High School. There he was named the 2004 Arizona Player of the Year and a McDonald's All-America nominee. He led his team to the 5A State Championship, averaging 20.0 points, 5.5 rebounds and 3.5 assists as a senior in 2003–04.

In his freshman year at BYU, he started 14 games, averaging 4.9 points while shooting .455 from the floor, .395 on threes and .765 from the line in 14.8 minutes overall for the Cougars. He also went 2-for-3 from three-point range against TCU to record 6 points while adding 4 rebounds and tying his career high with 4 assists in 19 minutes that season. In his sophomore year, Cummard started all 34 contests and averaging 9.4 points per game. He also led BYU in rebounds eight times, assists eight times and scoring twice, helping the Cougars claim the outright MWC title and a 25–9 overall record. In his junior season, he led BYU in rebounds, assists, and scoring, helping the team claim the outright MWC title and a 25–9 overall record. In his senior season, Cummard earned first-team All-MWC honors and was named a fourth-team All-American by FOXSports.com. He received High-Major All-America Second Team honors from CollegeHoops.net. That season, he received the Male Athlete of the Year Award and the Dale McCann Spirit of Sport Award at the 2009 Y Awards. That same season, Cummard was named to Wooden Award and Naismith Award preseason watch lists led the team in scoring, blocked shots, free throw percentage and three-point percentage was second on the team in field goal percentage, assists, and rebounding.

His name is found throughout the BYU record book, as Cummard is top-20 all-time in program history in scoring, field goals made, field goal percentage, 3-point field goals made, 3-point field goal percentage, free-throw percentage, rebounds, assists, blocks and steals. Cummard never missed a game as a player, appearing in all 131 games BYU played during his four seasons in Provo. He earned a starting spot midway through his freshman season and was in the starting five in 116 straight games.

Cummard started the 2009–10 season playing for Utah Flash in the D-League. Cummard played for the Sacramento Kings in the NBA Summer League in 2010. In January 2010 he signed with the Fos Ouest Provence Basket in France, with whom he played the remainder of the season. From 2012 to 2016, he playing for Okapi Aalstar in Belgium where he helped the club finish second in the regular season standings twice in four years. Okapi Aalstar made it to the league semifinals all four years Cummard was on the team, finishing as Belgian Cup runner-up in 2013.

== Coaching ==
In 2016, Cummard joined the coaching staff at Brigham Young University as a graduate assistant. On April 25, 2018, he was hired by BYU head coach Dave Rose as an assistant coach, filling a vacancy left by Heath Schroyer.

On March 31, 2025, BYU named Cummard its women's basketball coach after having served as interim coach since March 8 when Amber Whiting announced that she would not be returning for a fourth season as head coach.

== Head coaching record ==
Record table
Season	Team	Overall	Conference	Standing	Postseason
BYU Cougars (Big 12 Conference) (2025–present)
2025–26	BYU	26–12	9–9	T–9th	WBIT Runner-Up
BYU:		26–12 (.684)	9–9 (.500)		
Total:		26–12 (.684)			

== Personal ==
Cummard is married to Sarah Mabry; they have three sons. He is a member of the Church of Jesus Christ of Latter-day Saints and served as a missionary in Tennessee.
