= 2011–12 BYU Cougars women's basketball team =

Intercollegiate basketball season

2011–12 BYU Cougars women's basketball

2011 Hukilau Invitational Champions 2012 West Coast Conference Tournament Champions

NCAA Tournament 10-Seed, first round
- Conference: West Coast Conference
- Record: 26–7 (12–4 WCC)
- Head coach: Jeff Judkins (11th season)
- Assistant coaches: Chris Boettcher; Melinda Bendall; Ray Stewart
- Home arena: Marriott Center

2011–12 West Coast Conference women's basketball standings
	Conf.				Overall
Team	W		L	PCT	W		L	PCT
Gonzaga	14	–	2	.875	28	–	6	.824
BYU†	12	–	4	.750	26	–	7	.788
San Diego	12	–	4	.750	26	–	10	.722
Saint Mary's	11	–	5	.688	22	–	11	.667
Pepperdine	8	–	8	.500	14	–	15	.483
Santa Clara	5	–	11	.313	12	–	18	.400
Portland	4	–	12	.250	12	–	20	.375
San Francisco	3	–	13	.188	5	–	25	.167
Loyola Marymount	3	–	13	.188	8	–	22	.267
† 2012 West Coast Conference women's basketball tournament winner As of March 28, 2012/ FINAL 2011–12 STANDINGS; Rankings from AP Poll

The 2011–12 BYU Cougars women's basketball team represented Brigham Young University in the 2011–12 college basketball season. This was head coach Jeff Judkins eleventh season at BYU. The Cougars, played in their first season in the West Coast Conference and played their home games at the Marriott Center. The Cougars won the 2011 Hukilau Invitational and the 2012 West Coast Conference Basketball Tournament, earning themselves a 10-Seed in the NCAA Tournament. They lost in the first round to DePaul.

== Before the season ==
The Lady Cougars were picked to finish second in the WCC behind only Gonzaga in the pre-season polls.

== 2011-12 media ==
The Lady Cougars got more exposure than ever before for the 2011-12 season. Every Lady Cougars home game, except for the game against St. Mary's, was featured nationally on BYUtv Sports. Robbie Bullough acted as the play-by-play man, though Dave McCann and Jared Johnson were assigned a few games. Kristen Kozlowski served as the analyst for all BYUtv Sports broadcasts. Lakia Holmes served as the sideline reporter for the Winter Semester, but after she graduated multiple sideline reporters would be used for BYUtv.

=== BYU Radio Sports Network Affiliates ===
All Lady Cougar games that don't conflict with men's basketball or football games were featured live on BYU Radio found nationwide on Dish Network 980, on Sirius XM 143, and online at www.byuradio.org. Games not broadcast on BYU Radio were 11/19 (at Weber State), 12/3 (vs. Syracuse), 12/31 (at Saint Mary's), 1/7 (at San Francisco), 1/19 (at Loyola Marymount), and 2/2 (at Pepperdine). However internet streaming of all those games was available at the opposing schools website.

== Roster ==
2011–12 BYU Cougars women's basketball team
Players
Coaches

Pos.	#	Name	Height	Year	Previous school	Hometown
G	1	Sadi Dias	5 ft 7 in (1.7 m)	Fr	Pine View	St. George, UT
G	2	Stephanie Rovetti	5 ft 6 in (1.68 m)	RS Fr	Reno	Reno, NV
G	3	Ashley Garfield	5 ft 10 in (1.78 m)	Fr	Morgan	Morgan, UT
G	4	Kim Parker	5 ft 11 in (1.8 m)	RS So	Wasatch	Heber City, UT
C	5	Jennifer Hamson	6 ft 7 in (2.01 m)	So	Pleasant Grove	Lindon, UT
F	10	Alexis Kaufusi	6 ft 1 in (1.85 m)	Jr	Timpview	Provo, UT
G	11	Xojian Harry	5 ft 11 in (1.8 m)	Fr	Viewmont	Bountiful, UT
G/F	12	Stephanie Vermunt	6 ft 0 in (1.83 m)	RS So	Bert Church	Airdrie, UT
F	14	Mackenzie Nielson	6 ft 0 in (1.83 m)	Fr	Springville	Springville, UT
G	21	Lexi Eaton	5 ft 10 in (1.78 m)	Fr	Springville	Mapleton, UT
G	30	Kylie Brown (W)	5 ft 10 in (1.78 m)	Fr	Grangeville	Grangeville, ID
F	32	Dani Peterson	6 ft 1 in (1.85 m)	RS Sr	Skyline	Salt Lake City, UT
G	33	Haley Steed (C)	5 ft 4 in (1.63 m)	Sr	Clearfield	Syracuse, UT
F	35	Kristen Riley (C)	6 ft 3 in (1.91 m)	Sr	San Clemente	San Clemente, CA
F	41	Morgan Bailey	6 ft 2 in (1.88 m)	RS Fr	Timpanogos High School	Orem, UT
G	50	Valerie Nawahine (W)	5 ft 9 in (1.75 m)	Fr	Cathedral Catholic; La Jolla	La Jolla, CA
G	55	Kari Ryser (W)	5 ft 8 in (1.73 m)	So	Calabasas	Tarzana, CA

Head coach

- Jeff Judkins (Utah)

Assistant coach(es)

- Chris Boettcher (BYU)
- Melinda Bendall (BYU)
- Ray Stewart (Utah Valley)

Legend

- (C) Team captain
- (S) Suspended
- (I) Ineligible
- (W) Walk-on
- Injured
- Current redshirt

== Schedule and results ==
Date time, TV	Rank^{#}	Opponent^{#}	Result	Record	Site city, state
Exhibition
11/03/2011*; 7:00pm		Western Oregon	W 90–61	-	Marriott Center; Provo, UT
11/04/2011*; 4:00pm, BYUtv		Dixie State	W 91–54	-	Marriott Center; Provo, UT
Regular Season
11/11/2011*; 7:00pm, BYUtv		No. 8 Duke	L 55–61	0–1	Marriott Center; Provo, UT
11/14/2011*; 6:00pm		at Tulsa	W 46–59	1–1	Reynolds Center; Tulsa, OK
11/16/2011*; 6:00pm, K-StateHD		at Kansas State	L 46–59	1–2	Bramlage Coliseum; Manhattan, KS
11/19/2011*; 7:00pm, Big Sky TV		at Weber State	W 84–67	2–2	Dee Events Center; Ogden, UT
11/23/2011*; 7:00pm, BYUtv		Wisconsin	W 77–59	3–2	Marriott Center; Provo, UT
11/26/2011*; 7:00pm, BYUtv		Eastern Washington	W 77–58	4–2	Marriott Center; Provo, UT
11/29/2011*; 6:00pm		at BYU-Hawaiʻi; Hukilau Invitational	W 88–27	5–2	George Q. Cannon Activities Center; Laie, HI
12/01/2011*; 6:00pm		vs. Arizona; Hukilau Invitational	W 82–73	6–2	Cannon Activities Center; Laie, HI
12/03/2011*; 4:00pm		vs. Syracuse; Hukilau Invitational	W 83–59	7–2	Cannon Activities Center; Laie, HI
12/08/2011*; 7:00pm, BYUtv		Southern Utah	W 84–47	8–2	Marriott Center; Provo, UT
12/10/2011*; 3:00pm, BYUtv		Utah	W 63–58	9–2	Marriott Center; Provo, UT
12/17/2011*; 2:00pm, KCSG		at Utah State	W 73–65	10–2	Dee Glen Smith Spectrum; Logan, UT
12/22/2011*; 1:00pm, BYUtv		Nevada	W 84–53	11–2	Marriott Center; Provo, UT
12/31/2011; 3:00pm		at Saint Mary's	L 48–54	11–3 (0–1)	McKeon Pavilion; Moraga, CA
01/02/2012; 3:00pm		at Portland	W 79–53	12–3 (1–1)	Chiles Center; Portland, OR
01/05/2012; 5:00pm, BYUtv		Loyola Marymount	W 80–47	13–3 (2–1)	Marriott Center; Provo, UT
01/07/2012; 3:00pm		at San Francisco	W 76–67	14–3 (3–1)	War Memorial Gymnasium; San Francisco, CA
01/12/2012; 7:00pm, BYUtv		Pepperdine	W 80–56	15–3 (4–1)	Marriott Center; Provo, UT
01/14/2012; 3:00pm		at San Diego	W 62–53	16–3 (5–1)	Jenny Craig Pavilion; San Diego, CA
01/19/2012; 8:00pm		at Loyola Marymount	W 72–48	17–3 (6–1)	Gersten Pavilion; Los Angeles, CA
01/21/2012; 2:00pm, BYUtv		Portland	W 76–55	18–3 (7–1)	Marriott Center; Provo, UT
01/25/2012*; 8:00pm	No. 23	at Seattle	W 69–56	19–3	Connolly Center; Seattle, WA
01/28/2012; 3:00pm	No. 23	at Santa Clara	W 74–64	20–3 (8–1)	Leavey Center; Santa Clara, CA
02/02/2012; 8:00pm, TV-32 Malibu	No. 22	at Pepperdine	L 49–61	20–4 (8–2)	Firestone Fieldhouse; Malibu, CA
02/04/2012; 2:00pm	No. 22	Saint Mary's	W 83–47	21–4 (9–2)	Marriott Center; Provo, UT
02/09/2012; 7:00pm, BYUtv		No. 19 Gonzaga	W 70–40	22–4 (10–2)	Marriott Center; Provo, UT
02/16/2012; 7:00pm, BYUtv	No. 23	San Francisco	L 64–71	22–5 (10–3)	Marriott Center; Provo, UT
02/18/2012; 1:00pm, BYUtv	No. 23	San Diego	W 64–50	23–5 (11–3)	Marriott Center; Provo, UT
02/23/2012; 7:00pm, BYUtv		Santa Clara	W 84–57	24–5 (12–3)	Marriott Center; Provo, UT
02/25/2012; 3:00pm, SWX		at No. 25 Gonzaga	L 60–77	24–6 (12–4)	McCarthey Athletic Center; Spokane, WA
2012 West Coast Conference women's basketball tournament
03/03/2012; 3:30pm, BYUtv		vs. San Diego; Semi-finals	W 64–46	25–6	Orleans Arena; Las Vegas, NV
03/05/2012; 1:00pm, ESPNU		vs. No. 23 Gonzaga; Championship	W 78–66	26–6	Orleans Arena; Las Vegas, NV
2012 NCAA Division I women's basketball tournament
03/17/2012*; 4:26pm, ESPN2		at DePaul; NCAA 1st Round	L 55–59	26–7	Allstate Arena; Rosemont, IL
*Non-conference game. ^{#}Rankings from AP Poll. (#) Tournament seedings in parentheses.

== Game summaries ==
Nov 3
7:00 pm

Recap

Western Oregon Wolves 61, BYU Cougars 90
Scoring by half: 29–40, 32–50
Pts: Rylee Peterson 25; Rebs: Lorrie Clifford 6 Asts: 3 tied with 2	Pts: Lexi Eaton 14; Rebs: Stephanie Vermunt 4 Asts: Haley Steed 6

Marriott Center
Provo, UT
Attendance: 400
Referees: Robert Schofield, Karen Lasuik, Tiffany Bird

BYUtv

Nov 4
4:00 pm

Recap

Dixie State Red Storm 54, BYU Cougars 91
Scoring by half: 24–47, 30–44
Pts: 2 tied with 9 Rebs: Becca Thomas 4 Asts: 2 tied with 3	Pts: 2 tied with 15; Rebs: Stephanie Vermunt 8 Asts: Haley Steed 6

Marriott Center
Provo, UT
Attendance: 1,153
Referees: Michelle Russi, Carla Fujimoto, Tiffany Jump

BYUtv

Nov 11
7:00 pm

Recap

#8 Duke Blue Devils 61, BYU Cougars 55
Scoring by half: 27–20, 34–35
Pts: Chelsea Gray 15; Rebs: 2 tied with 5 Asts: Chloe Wells 4	Pts: Kim Parker 14; Rebs: Haley Steed 15; Asts: Haley Steed 5

Marriott Center
Provo, UT
Attendance: 2,553
Referees: Brenda Pantoja, Bethany Graves, Benny Luna

tulsahurricane.com

Nov 14
6:00 pm

Recap

BYU Cougars 64, Tulsa Golden Hurricane 61
Scoring by half: 28–27, 36–34
Pts: Haley Steed 24; Rebs: Kristen Riley 12; Asts: Kim Parker 5	Pts: Taylor Hooker 16; Rebs: 3 tied with 6 Asts: Taleya Mayberry 5

Reynolds Center
Tulsa, OK
Attendance: 577
Referees: Felicia Grinter, Michelle Kramer, Rachael Monroe

K-StateHD.TV

Nov 16
6:00 pm

Recap

BYU Cougars 46, Kansas State Wildcats 59
Scoring by half: 21–29, 25–30
Pts: Lexi Eaton 16; Rebs: 2 tied with 5 Asts: Haley Steed 5	Pts: Jalana Childs 18; Rebs: Jalana Childs 9 Asts: Mariah White 5

Bramlage Coliseum
Manhattan, KS
Attendance: 2,889
Referees: Michael Price, Laura Morris, Jules Gallien

Big Sky TV

Nov 19
7:00 pm

Recap

BYU Cougars 84, Weber State Wildcats 67
Scoring by half: 48–28, 36–39
Pts: 2 tied with 12; Rebs: Haley Steed 10; Asts: Haley Steed 5	Pts: Mikell Woodfield 14; Rebs: Mikell Woodfield 7 Asts: 2 tied with 3

Dee Events Center
Ogden, UT
Attendance: 864
Referees: Michelle Russi, Warren Smith, Rachael Monroe

BYUtv

Nov 23
7:00 pm

Recap

Wisconsin Badgers 59, BYU Cougars 77
Scoring by half: 33–46, 26–31
Pts: Taylor Wurtz 18; Rebs: Taylor Wurtz 8 Asts: 2 tied with 3	Pts: Dani Peterson 15; Rebs: Lexi Eaton 4 Asts: Haley Steed 7

Marriott Center
Provo, UT
Attendance: 711
Referees: Penny Davis, Richard Waters, Lisa Ulmer

BYUtv

Nov 26
7:00 pm

Recap

Eastern Washington Eagles 59, BYU Cougars 77
Scoring by half: 33–46, 26–31
Pts: Taylor Wurtz 18; Rebs: Taylor Wurtz 8 Asts: 2 tied with 3	Pts: Dani Peterson 15; Rebs: Lexi Eaton 4 Asts: Haley Steed 7

Marriott Center
Provo, UT
Attendance: 719
Referees: Marianne Karp, Jay Schumaker, Renee Robinson

americaonesports.com

Nov 29
6:00 pm

Recap

BYU Cougars 88, BYU-Hawaiʻi Seasiders 27
Scoring by half: 48–8, 40–19
Pts: Kim Parker 17; Rebs: Stephanie Rovetti 6 Asts: Haley Steed 6	Pts: Shayla Washington 10; Rebs: Taylor Mann 8 Asts: Taylor Mann 2

George Q. Cannon Activities Center
Laie, HI
Attendance: 111
Referees: Laura Rahe, Tim Tamashiro, Ken Sobe

americaonesports.com

Dec 1
6:00 pm

Recap

Arizona Wildcats 73, BYU Cougars 82
Scoring by half: 33–38, 40–44
Pts: Davellyn Whyte 19; Rebs: Erica Barnes 8 Asts: Candice Warthen 6	Pts: Kim Parker 25; Rebs: Kristen Riley 12; Asts: 3 tied with 6

George Q. Cannon Activities Center
Laie, HI
Attendance: 211
Referees: Laura Rahe, Ken Sobe, Kirk Hottendorf

americaonesports.com

Dec 3
4:00 pm

Recap

Syracuse Orange 59, BYU Cougars 83
Scoring by half: 25–45, 34–38
Pts: Kayla Alexander 26; Rebs: Kayla Alexander 6 Asts: Rachel Coffey 2	Pts: Kim Parker 22; Rebs: Dani Peterson 10; Asts: Haley Steed 8

George Q. Cannon Activities Center
Laie, HI
Attendance: 75
Referees: Laura Rahe, Tiki Kahoano, Ken Sobe

BYUtv

Dec 8
7:00 pm

Recap

Southern Utah Thunderbirds 73, BYU Cougars 82
Scoring by half: 15–35, 34–47
Pts: Tayler Anderson 12; Rebs: Kimie Hawkins 8 Asts: 3 tied with 2	Pts: Kim Parker 17; Rebs: Jennifer Hamson 7 Asts: Haley Steed 6

Marriott Center
Provo, UT
Attendance: 711
Referees: Kyle Bacon, Bret Gervasoni, Enrique Arroyo

BYUtv

Dec 10
3:00 pm

Recap

Utah Utes 58, BYU Cougars 63
Scoring by half: 29–30, 29–33
Pts: Michelle Plouffe 21; Rebs: Michelle Plouffe 9 Asts: Janita Badon 5	Pts: Stephanie Vermunt 14; Rebs: Haley Steed 9 Asts: Haley Steed 8

Marriott Center
Provo, UT
Attendance: 1,270
Referees: Anita Ortega, Shelley Nakasone, Brian Woods

KCSG

Dec 17
2:00 pm

Recap

BYU Cougars 73, Utah State Aggies 65
Scoring by half: 24–34, 49–31
Pts: Dani Peterson 14; Rebs: Haley Steed 10; Asts: Haley Steed 8	Pts: Devyn Christensen 18; Rebs: Ashlee Brown 8 Asts: Ashlee Brown 4

Dee Glen Smith Spectrum
Logan, UT
Attendance: 551
Referees: Kent Johnson, Julie Krommenhoek, Eric Larson

BYUtv

Dec 22
1:00 pm

Recap

Nevada Wolf Pack 53, BYU Cougars 84
Scoring by half: 22–44, 31–40
Pts: Danika Sharp 14; Rebs: 3 tied with 4 Asts: Arielle Wideman 4	Pts: Kristen Riley 17; Rebs: Jennifer Hamson 10; Asts: Haley Steed 11

Marriott Center
Provo, UT
Attendance: 801
Referees: Chuck Gonzales, Rick Showers, Cheryll Blue

smcgaels.com

Dec 31
3:00 pm

Recap

BYU Cougars 48, Saint Mary's Gaels 54
Scoring by half: 24-30, 24-24
Pts: Kristen Riley 17; Rebs: Kristen Riley 11; Asts: Haley Steed 5	Pts: Jackie Nared 16; Rebs: 2 tied with 8 Asts: Alex Carbonel 3

McKeon Pavilion
Moraga, CA
Attendance: 438
Referees: Shelley Russi, Alejandro Moreno, Lorena Ahumada

Portlandpilots.com

Jan 2
3:00 pm

Recap

BYU Cougars 79, Portland Pilots 53
Scoring by half: 27-26, 52-27
Pts: Kristen Riley 19; Rebs: 2 tied with 9 Asts: Haley Steed 5	Pts: Natalie Day 16; Rebs: 2 tied with 7 Asts: ReZina TecleMariam 9

Chiles Center
Portland, OR
Attendance: 312
Referees: Wanda Szermeta, Karen Lasuik, Tiffany Jump

BYUtv

Jan 5
5:00 pm

Recap

Loyola Marymount Lions 47, BYU Cougars 80
Scoring by half: 22-48, 25-32
Pts: Alex Cowling 23; Rebs: 2 tied with 7 Asts: 2 tied with 2	Pts: Kristen Riley 16; Rebs: Jennifer Hamson 7 Asts: Haley Steed 8

Marriott Center
Provo, UT
Attendance: 787
Referees: Michol Murraym, Shelley Nakasone, Alecia Balich-Murray

usfdons.com

Jan 7
3:00 pm

Recap

BYU Cougars 76, San Francisco Dons 67
Scoring by half: 38-32, 38-35
Pts: Kristen Riley 19; Rebs: Jennifer Hamson 7 Asts: Haley Steed 5	Pts: Rheina Ale 21; Rebs: 6 tied with 4 Asts: 2 tied with 2

War Memorial Gymnasium/ The Hilltop
San Francisco, CA
Attendance: 517
Referees: Anita Ortega, Paul Patterson, Gordon Torigoe

BYUtv

Jan 12
7:00 pm

Recap

Pepperdine Waves 56, BYU Cougars 80
Scoring by half: 27-37, 29-43
Pts: Lauren Bell 16; Rebs: Jazmine Jackson 6 Asts: Lauren Bell 4	Pts: Lexi Eaton 15; Rebs: 2 tied with 7 Asts: Haley Steed 14; Coach Jeff Judkins 220th win- new record for BYU Women's Basketball Coach

Marriott Center
Provo, UT
Attendance: 1,304
Referees: Rich Showers, Brian Woods, Tiffany Bird

usdtoreros.com

Jan 14
3:00 pm

Recap

BYU Cougars 62, San Diego Toreros 53
Scoring by half: 30-29, 32-24
Pts: Lexi Eaton 16; Rebs: Kristen Riley 13; Asts: Haley Steed 5	Pts: Amy Kame 19; Rebs: Izzy Chilcott 12; Asts: Izzy Chilcott 3

Jenny Craig Pavilion/ The Slim Gym
San Diego, CA
Attendance: 606
Referees: Kyle Bacon, Jay Schumaker, Jeff Yamoka

lmulions.com

Jan 19
8:00 pm

Recap

BYU Cougars 72, Loyola Marymount Lions 48
Scoring by half: 31-20, 41-28
Pts: Kristen Riley 22; Rebs: Kristen Riley 10; Asts: Haley Steed 9	Pts: Alex Cowling 14; Rebs: Alex Cowling 8 Asts: Dani LeNoir 4

Gersten Pavilion
Los Angeles, CA
Attendance: 298
Referees: Chuck Gonzales, Mary Whatford, Tiffany Jump

BYUtv

Jan 21
2:00 pm

Recap

Portland Pilots 55, BYU Cougars 76
Scoring by half: 28-41, 27-35
Pts: Cassandra Brown 14; Rebs: Natalie Day 9 Asts: Amy Pupa 4	Pts: Lexi Eaton 16; Rebs: Jennifer Hamson 10; Asts: Haley Steed 10

Marriott Center
Provo, UT
Attendance: 1,196
Referees: Jim Morrell, Cheryl Flores, Enrique Arroyo

goseattleu.com

Jan 25
8:00 pm

Recap

#23 BYU Cougars 69, Seattle Redhawks 56
Scoring by half: 36-22, 33-34
Pts: Kristen Riley 16; Rebs: Kristen Riley 10; Asts: Haley Steed 5	Pts: Ashley Ward 18; Rebs: Kacie Sowell 16; Asts: 3 tied with 2

Connolly Center
Seattle, WA
Attendance: 677
Referees: Lisa Jones, Wanda Szermeta, Bob Scofield

santaclarabroncos.com

Jan 28
3:00 pm

Recap

#23 BYU Cougars 74, Santa Clara Broncos 64
Scoring by half: 36-39, 38-25
Pts: Kristen Riley 17; Rebs: Kristen Riley 11; Asts: Kim Parker 3	Pts: Meagan Fulps 24; Rebs: Lindsay Leo 14; Asts: 2 tied with 2

Leavey Center
Santa Clara, CA
Attendance: 805
Referees: Cathi Cornell, Chris Hirano, Skelly Wigard

pepperdinesports.com
TV-32 Malibu

Feb 2
8:00 pm

Recap

#22 BYU Cougars 49, Pepperdine Waves 61
Scoring by half: 23-22, 26-39
Pts: Kristen Riley 15; Rebs: Kristen Riley 13; Asts: Haley Steed 8	Pts: Lauren Bell 26; Rebs: Skye Barnett 9 Asts: Skye Barnett 3

Firestone Fieldhouse
Malibu, CA
Attendance: 313
Referees: Anita Ortega, Rick Showers, Crystal Hogan

Feb 4
2:00 pm

Recap

Saint Mary's Gaels 47, #22 BYU Cougars 83
Scoring by half: 23-44, 24-39
Pts: Jackie Nared 8 Rebs: 3 tied with 7 Asts: Morgan Hatten 3	Pts: Jennifer Hamson 18; Rebs: Jennifer Hamson 9 Asts: Haley Steed 10

Marriott Center
Provo, UT
Attendance: 1,296
Referees: Darren Krzesnick, Lisa Ulmer, Paul Patterson

BYUtv

Feb 9
7:00 pm

Recap

#19 Gonzaga Bulldogs 40, BYU Cougars 70
Scoring by half: 20-24, 20-46
Pts: Kayla Standish 12; Rebs: Kayla Standish 12; Asts: Taelor Karr 2	Pts: Kim Parker 16; Rebs: 2 tied with 10; Asts: Haley Steed 10

Marriott Center
Provo, UT
Attendance: 2,014
Referees: Chuck Gonzales, Lorena Ahumada, Jay Schumaker

BYUtv

Feb 16
7:00 pm

Recap

San Francisco Dons 71, #23 BYU Cougars 64
Scoring by half: 35-32, 36-32
Pts: Jamie Katuna 21; Rebs: Bailey Barbour 7 Asts: Mel Kholk 7	Pts: Kristen Riley 16; Rebs: Kristen Riley 11; Asts: Haley Steed 6

Marriott Center
Provo, UT
Attendance: 968
Referees: Brenda Patoja, Mary Whatford, Julie Vanni

BYUtv

Feb 18
1:00 pm

Recap

San Diego Toreros 50, #23 BYU Cougars 64
Scoring by half: 26-26, 24-38
Pts: Dominique Connors 11; Rebs: 2 tied with 6 Asts: Dominique Connors 3	Pts: 2 tied with 14; Rebs: Kristen Riley 13; Asts: Haley Steed 5 Haley Steed becomes #2 All-Time in Assts at BYU

Marriott Center
Provo, UT
Attendance: 1,129
Referees: Wanda Szermeta, Bret Gervasoni, Richard Waters

BYUtv

Feb 23
7:00 pm

Recap

Santa Clara Broncos 57, BYU Cougars 84
Scoring by half: 22-46, 35-38
Pts: Ricki Radanovich 14; Rebs: Ashley Armstrong 6 Asts: 4 tied with 2	Pts: Kristen Riley 17; Rebs: Dani Peterson 13; Asts: Haley Steed 11

Marriott Center
Provo, UT
Attendance: 1,424
Referees: Michael Price, Kyle Bacon, Bart Baldwin

SWX, gozags.com

Feb 25
3:00 pm

Recap

BYU Cougars 60, #25 Gonzaga Bulldogs 77
Scoring by half: 27-29, 33-48
Pts: Haley Steed 17; Rebs: Kristen Riley 9 Asts: Haley Steed 8	Pts: Katelan Redmon 28; Rebs: Kelly Bowen 8 Asts: Taelor Karr 6

McCarthey Athletic Center/The Kennel
Spokane, WA
Attendance: 6,000
Referees: Michelle Russi, Darren Krzesnik, Skelly Wingard

BYUtv

Mar 3
3:30 pm

Recap

BYU Cougars 64, San Diego Toreros 46
Scoring by half: 29-21, 35-25
Pts: Lexi Eaton 26; Rebs: Kristen Riley 10; Asts: Haley Steed 8	Pts: Dominique Conners 20; Rebs: Amy Kame 9 Asts: Dominique Conners 2

Orleans Arena
Las Vegas, NV
Attendance: 2,341
Referees: Anita Ortega, Brenda Pantoja, Kyle Bacon

ESPNU

Mar 5
1:00 pm

Recap

#23 Gonzaga Bulldogs 66, BYU Cougars 78
Scoring by half: 35-36, 31-42
Pts: Haiden Palmer 28; Rebs: Haiden Palmer 5 Asts: Taelor Karr 5	Pts: Dani Peterson 18; Rebs: Dani Peterson 12; Asts: Kim Parker 10

Orleans Arena
Las Vegas, NV
Attendance: 2,941
Referees: Melissa Barlow, Brenda Pantoja, Darren Krzesnik

ESPN2

Mar 17
4:26 pm

Recap

BYU Cougars 55, DePaul Blue Demons 59
Scoring by half: 29-27, 26-32
Pts: Jennifer Hamson 21; Rebs: Kristen Riley 12; Asts: Kristen Riley 7	Pts: Anna Martin 17; Rebs: Katherine Harry 9 Asts: Brittany Hrynko 3

Allstate Arena
Rosemont, IL
Attendance: 4,161
Referees: Karen Lasuik, Denise Brooks, Jeneane Pence

== Game-by-Game TV and Internet Streaming Announcers ==
Dixie State: Robbie Bullough and Kristen Kozlowski
Duke: Dave McCann, Kristen Kozlowski, and Lakia Holmes
at Tulsa: Brandon Hart
at Kansas State: Brian Smoller and Danielle Zanotti
at Weber State: Trevor Amicone and M Brandon Garside
Wisconsin: Robbie Bullough, Kristen Kozlowski, and Lakia Holmes
Eastern Washington: Robbie Bullough, Kristen Kozlowski, and Lakia Holmes
at BYU-Hawaiʻi: Robbie Bullough
vs. Arizona: Robbie Bullough
vs. Syracuse: Brian Higgins
Southern Utah: Jared Johnson, Kristen Kozlowski, and Lakia Holmes
Utah: Dave McCann, Kristen Kozlowski, and Lakia Holmes
at Utah State: Mychal Clayton and Brooks Hansen
Nevada: Robbie Bullough and Kristen Kozolwski
at Saint Mary's: Alex Jensen
at Portland: Sarah Griffin
Loyola Marymount: Robbie Bullough and Kristen Kozlowski
at San Francisco: George Devine
Pepperdine: Robbie Bullough, Kristen Kozlowski, and Harrison Collier
at San Diego: Paula Bott
at Loyola Marymount: Angie Kiel and Bryn Britton
Portland: Robbie Bullough, Kristen Kozolwski, and Harrison Collier
at Seattle: Brian Abker and Gary Hill Jr.
at Santa Clara: Sam Farber
at Pepperdine: Izzy Loya and Skyler Davenport
#19 Gonzaga: Robbie Bullough, Kristen Kozlowski, and Harrison Collier
San Francisco: Robbie Bullough and Kristen Kozlowski
San Diego: Robbie Bullough, Kristen Kozlowski, and Rachel Schwartz
Santa Clara: Robbie Bullough, Kristen Kozlowski, and Blake Tillotson
at #25 Gonzaga: Sam Adams and Stephanie Hawk Freeman
WCC Semifinals- San Diego: Dave McCann and Steve Cleveland
WCC Championship- #23 Gonzaga: Dave Flemming and Kayte Christensen
NCAA 1st Round- DePaul: Jon Sciambi and Brooke Weisbrod

== Rankings ==
+ Regular season polls	Poll	Pre- Season	Week 1	Week 2	Week 3	Week 4	Week 5	Week 6	Week 7	Week 8	Week 9	Week 10	Week 11	Week 12	Week 13	Week 14	Week 15	Week 16	Week 17	Week 18	Final
AP	(NV)	(NV)	(NV)	(NV)	(NV)	(RV)	(RV)	(RV)	(NV)	(NV)	(RV)	23	22	(RV)	23	(RV)	(NV)	(NV)	(RV)		
Coaches	(NV)	(NV)	(NV)	(NV)	(NV)	(NV)	(NV)	(RV)	(NV)	(NV)	(NV)	(RV)	(RV)	(RV)	(RV)	(NV)	(NV)	(NV)	(NV)		

Legend
	Increase in ranking
	Decrease in ranking
	No change
(RV)	Received votes
(NV)	No Votes

== See also ==
- BYU Cougars women's basketball
