= Brigham Young Cougars basketball =

Brigham Young Cougars basketball may refer to either of the basketball teams that represent the Brigham Young University:

- BYU Cougars men's basketball
- BYU Cougars women's basketball
