= Crystal Beach, Florida =

Crystal Beach
- Unincorporated community
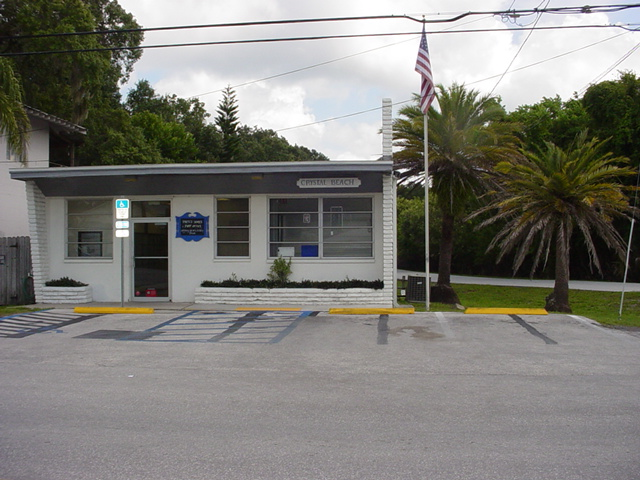
- Post office

- Location within the state of Florida
- Coordinates: 28°05′29″N 82°46′47″W
- Country: United States
- State: Florida
- County: Pinellas
- Elevation: 13 ft (4.0 m)
- Time zone: UTC-5 (Eastern (EST))
  - Summer (DST): UTC-4 (EDT)
- ZIP codes: 34681
- Area code: 727
- GNIS feature ID: 293977

Crystal Beach is an unincorporated community in the census-designated place of Palm Harbor in Pinellas County, Florida, United States. Crystal Beach is one of the original communities in Pinellas County.

== History ==
The first settlers came to the area and began homesteading around 1850. It was initially called the town of Seaside and the Orange Belt Railway was completed in the Spring of 1888 and connected the town of Seaside North to Tarpon Springs and South to Dunedin, Clearwater and St. Petersburgh.

Land developers Dr. J.D. Hanby and A.D. Powers of the Crystal Beach Development Co. took over a beach side development company that was initially started by Mr. Avery and Mr. Rebstock & Co.. John E Rebstock (1852–1924). Rebstock was the founder of Crystal Beach Park in Crystal Beach, Ontario. Crystal Beach, Ontario that was originally a Chautauqua with a beach and side show attractions in 1888. Rebstock turned his Park in Canada into a full-fledged amusement park and vacation destination in 1890. Avery and Rebstock named Crystal Beach, FL after their Amusement Park on Lake Erie in Canada. They referred to it as "Little Crystal Beach", but the town was still Seaside. Before the Great Depression, the Crystal Beach Development Company platted the community and laid out a gridded street system. Included in that plat was a park along the Gulf of Mexico. Named Gulf Shore Park, this area was described in marketing materials produced by the company in 1927 as a “narrow strip of land entirely along the west of Gulf Drive from the north end of the drive to the south end of the property.” It consists of a shell path and paved portions of Gulf Drive running from Georgia Avenue to Ohio Avenue. Powers and Hanby intended the park land to be forever held as a public amenity, and wrote, “This park is for all the people all the time. It is the front yard of Crystal Beach, and you are always welcome to come and enjoy the sunsets and cooling breezes.” The company clearly believed they were building a special community and saw the Gulf Shore Park as a focal point in preserving access to the beautiful waterfront for everyone, and part of the foundational character of Crystal Beach. Pinellas County separated from Hillsborough County in 1911. A Pinellas County Property map from 1925 identifies the town of Seaside with a Crystal Beach along the shore and a Crystal Beach Avenue leading to its Live Oak Park and Crystal Beach. Once Hanby and Powers started marketing their development after 1925, the community took on its modern name of Crystal Beach and this was solidified when the US Post Office assigned it a zip code 34681.

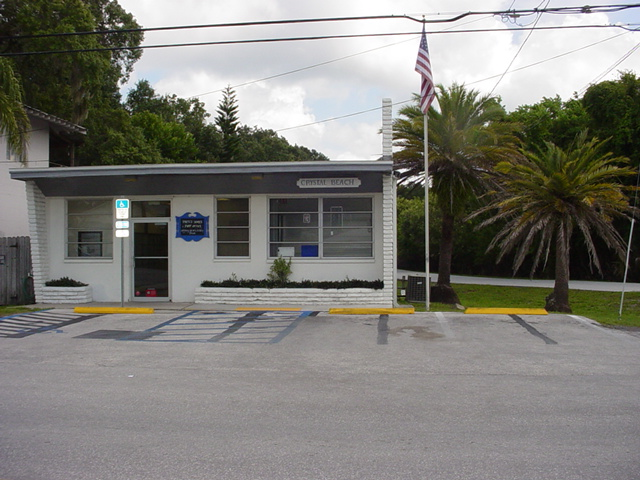
Post Office Crystal Beach FL

== Post office ==
The United States Postal Service operates the Crystal Beach Post Office at 420 Crystal Beach Avenue. Residents of Crystal Beach do not have home mail delivery; they travel to the post office to send and receive mail.

As of June 2025, the Crystal Beach pier has been destroyed by a hurricane but is in the process of being rebuilt.
