= Amber Whiting =

American college basketball coach

Career information
- College: Snow College (1997–1999); Weber State (1999–2000); BYU (2000–2001)
- Coaching career: 2018–present

Career history

Coaching
- 2018-2022: Burley HS
- 2022–2025: BYU

Amber Whiting (née Russell) is an American college basketball coach who was the head coach of the Brigham Young University (BYU) women's basketball team from 2022 to 2025. Prior to that, she coached high school basketball in Idaho. Whiting also played for the BYU women's basketball team during the 2000–01 season.

== Career ==
Whiting was born in Ogden, Utah. She played college basketball for three colleges in Utah: Snow College from 1997 to 1999, Weber State University in 1999–2000, and BYU in 2000–01. She began her coaching career by coaching AAU basketball and other private academy teams. From 2018 to 2022, she coached the girls' basketball team at Burley High School in Burley, Idaho. She led the team to a state championship in 2022 and was named the 4A Coach of the Year by the Idaho Statesman.

BYU hired Whiting as head coach prior to the 2022–23 season. In her first season, she led the team to a 16–17 record and an appearance in the 2023 Women's National Invitation Tournament.

Whiting was fired as coach of the BYU women's basketball team on March 8, 2025.

== Personal life ==
Whiting is married to Trent Whiting, who also played college basketball at Snow College and BYU. The two met while students at Snow College. She and Trent have two children; her daughter Amari played under her at BYU for two years.

== Head coaching record ==
Record table
Season	Team	Overall	Conference	Standing	Postseason
BYU (West Coast Conference) (2022–2023)
2022–23	BYU	16–17	9–9	T-4th	WNIT First Round
BYU (Big 12 Conference) (2023–2025)
2023–24	BYU	16–17	6–12	T–9th	WBIT First Round
2024–25	BYU	13–17	4–14	T–12th	—
BYU:		45–51 (.469)	19–35 (.352)		
Total:		45–51 (.469)	19–35 (.352)		
National champion Postseason invitational champion Conference regular season champion Conference regular season and conference tournament champion Division regular season champion Division regular season and conference tournament champion Conference tournament champion
