= Morgan High School (Utah) =

Location
- 55 N. 200 E. Morgan, Utah 84050; United States
- Coordinates: 41°02′18″N 111°40′24″W

Information
- Type: Public
- Established: 1911
- NCES School ID: 490057000363
- Principal: Thomas, Lucas
- Faculty: 30
- Teaching staff: 46.93 (FTE)
- Grades: 9–12
- Enrollment: 1,143 (2023–2024)
- Student to teacher ratio: 24.36
- Colors: Maroon and white
- Team name: Trojans
- Website: www.mhs.morgansd.org

Morgan High School is a public high school in Morgan, Utah, United States, for grades 9–12. It is the only high school in Morgan County and the Morgan School District. Morgan High School is accredited by the Northwestern Accreditation Association.
