= Jeff Judkins =

American basketball player and coach (born 1956)

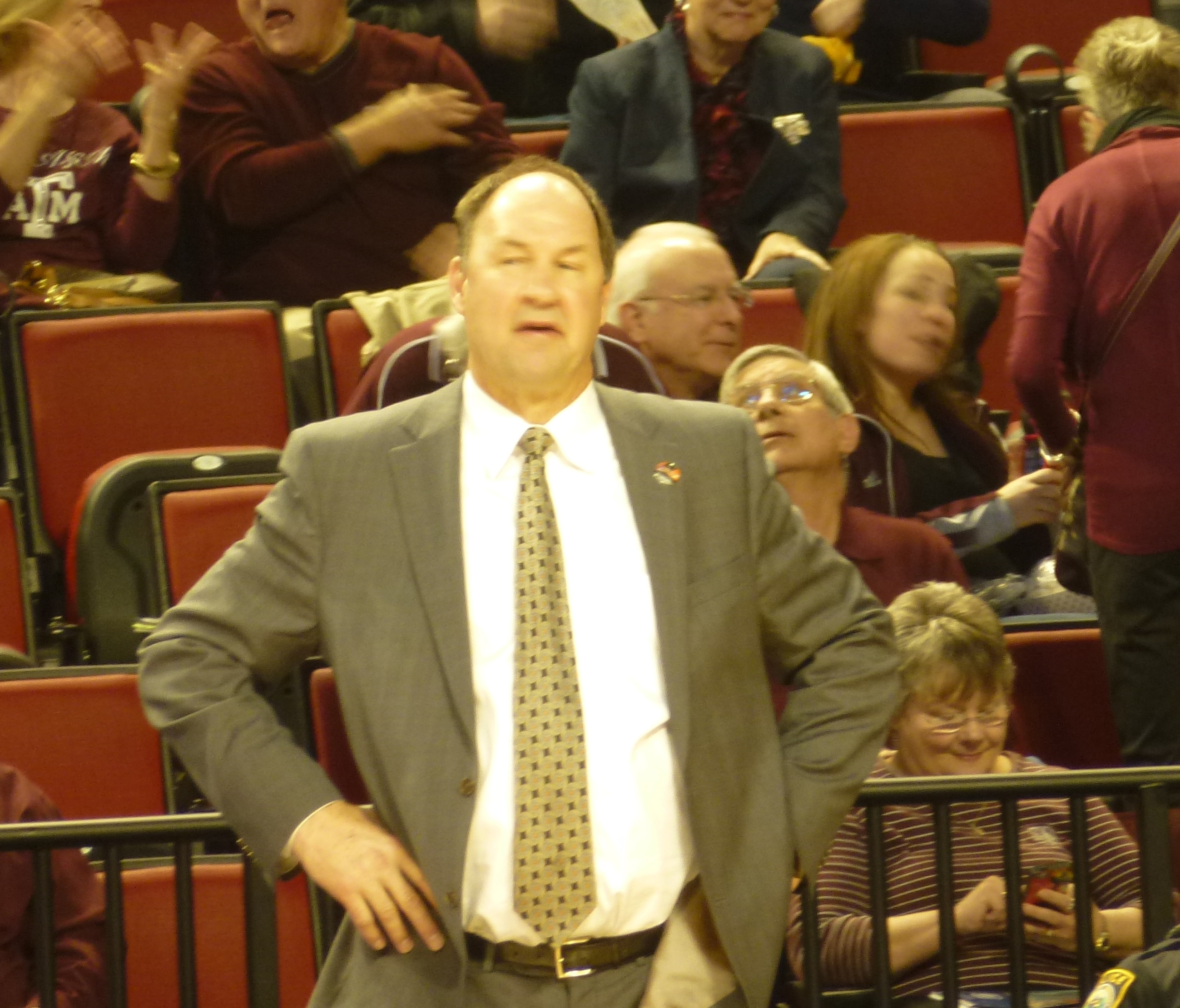

Utah Utes
- Title: Assistant coach
- League: Big 12 conference

Personal information
- Born: March 23, 1956 (age 70) Salt Lake City, Utah, U.S.
- Listed height: 6 ft 6 in (1.98 m)
- Listed weight: 240 lb (109 kg)

Career information
- High school: Highland (Salt Lake City, Utah)
- College: Utah (1974–1978)
- NBA draft: 1978: 2nd round, 30th overall pick
- Drafted by: Boston Celtics
- Playing career: 1978–1983
- Position: Shooting guard / small forward
- Number: 32, 5, 22
- Coaching career: 1989–present

Career history

Playing
- 1978–1980: Boston Celtics
- 1980–1981: Utah Jazz
- 1981–1982: Detroit Pistons
- 1982–1983: Portland Trail Blazers

Coaching
- 1989–1999: U of Utah (men's asst.)
- 1999–2001: BYU (women's asst.)
- 2001–2022: BYU (women's)
- 2023–present: U of Utah (women's asst.)

Career highlights
- 3× First-team All-WAC (1976–1978)

Career NBA playing statistics
- Points: 1,482 (5.4 ppg)
- Rebounds: 427 (1.6 rpg)
- Assists: 282 (1.0 apg)
- Stats at NBA.com
- Stats at Basketball Reference

Career coaching record
- MWC/WCC: 456–204 (.691)

Jeff Reed Judkins (born March 27, 1956) is an American former professional basketball player and coach. He coached the Brigham Young University (BYU) Cougars women's basketball team from 2001 to 2022, after serving as their assistant coach in 2000–01. A 6'6", 185-lb shooting guard, he played college basketball for the Utah Utes from 1974 to 1978 and had a career in the NBA from 1978 to 1983.

== Early life and education ==
Born in Salt Lake City, Judkins attended Highland High School, where his jersey no. 34 was retired in February 2006. He was all-state in football, baseball as well as basketball. After high school, he played with the University of Utah under Utes head coach Jerry Pimm.

== Professional playing career ==
Judkins was selected by the Boston Celtics with the 8th pick in the 2nd round of the 1978 NBA draft (he was Boston's second pick in that draft after Hall-of-Famer Larry Bird.) He would be the last Celtic to wear #32 before the arrival of Kevin McHale. As well as playing for the Celtics, Judkins spent time with the Utah Jazz, Detroit Pistons and Portland Trail Blazers. He holds career averages of 5.4 points, 1.6 rebounds and 1.0 assist per game.

== Coaching career ==
After retiring from professional basketball, Judkins became an executive with Safelite.

As well as previously serving at BYU as a women's assistant coach to his predecessor Trent Shippen, and as the director of basketball operations, Judkins has also served as a men's assistant coach under Rick Majerus at the University of Utah.
Judkins served as assistant coach for his alma mater men's basketball team from 1989 to 1999.
After leaving Utah, he became assistant coach for BYU Cougars from 1999 to 2001 before being promoted to head coach, where he led the Cougars to 10 NCAA tournament appearances in his 21 years as head coach.
Judkins retired from head coach of BYU at the conclusion of the 2021–22 season.
After being retired for a year, Judkins became Utah Utes Assistant Coach of Player Development and Community Ambassador in September 2023.

== Personal life ==
A member of the Church of Jesus Christ of Latter-day Saints, Judkins is married and has five children and 21 grandchildren. Judkins' brother, Jon, is currently the head coach of Division I Utah Tech in St. George, Utah He is a cousin of Danny Vranes, his teammate at Utah.

== Career playing statistics ==
Legend
GP	Games played	GS	Games started	MPG	Minutes per game
FG%	Field goal percentage	3P%	3-point field goal percentage	FT%	Free throw percentage
RPG	Rebounds per game	APG	Assists per game	SPG	Steals per game
BPG	Blocks per game	PPG	Points per game	**Bold**	Career high

=== NBA ===
==== Regular season ====
Year	Team	GP	GS	MPG	FG%	3P%	FT%	RPG	APG	SPG	BPG	PPG
1978–79	Boston	**81**		**18.8**	.503		.815	**2.4**	**1.8**	**1.0**	.1	**8.8**
1979–80	Boston	65	0	10.4	**.504**	**.407**	.816	1.0	.7	.4	.1	5.4
1980–81	Utah	62		10.7	.426	.321	**.882**	1.5	1.0	.3	.0	3.8
1981–82	Detroit	30	0	8.4	.383	.100	.615	1.1	.5	.2	**.2**	2.6
1982–83	Portland	34	0	9.1	.443	.250	.833	1.3	.5	.4	.1	3.1
Career		272	0	12.6	.478	.315	.812	1.6	1.0	.5	.1	5.4

==== Playoffs ====
Year	Team	GP	MPG	FG%	3P%	FT%	RPG	APG	SPG	BPG	PPG
1980	Boston	7	1.4	.500	.333	–	.6	.0	.1	.0	1.3

== Head coaching record ==
Record table
Season	Team	Overall	Conference	Standing	Postseason
BYU Cougars (Mountain West Conference) (2001–2011)
2001–02	BYU	24–9	10–4	2nd	NCAA Sweet Sixteen
2002–03	BYU	19–12	8–6	T–3rd	NCAA first round
2003–04	BYU	15–14	5–9	6th	
2004–05	BYU	19–11	9–5	3rd	WNIT First Round
2005–06	BYU	26–6	13–3	1st	NCAA second round
2006–07	BYU	23–10	12–4	1st	NCAA first round
2007–08	BYU	13–16	7–9	T–5th	
2008–09	BYU	18–11	8–8	T–5th	
2009–10	BYU	23–10	11–5	2nd	WNIT Quarterfinals
2010–11	BYU	25–9	15–1	1st	WNIT Third Round
BYU (MW):		205–108 (.655)	98–54 (.645)		
BYU Cougars (West Coast Conference) (2011–2022)
2011–12	BYU	26–7	12–4	2nd	NCAA first round
2012–13	BYU	23–11	11–5	T–3rd	WNIT Third Round
2013–14	BYU	28–7	14–4	2nd	NCAA Sweet Sixteen
2014–15	BYU	23–10	12–6	5th	NCAA first round
2015–16	BYU	26–7	16–2	1st	NCAA first round
2016–17	BYU	20–12	13–5	T-2nd	WNIT First Round
2017–18	BYU	16–14	11–7	4th	
2018–19	BYU	26–7	11–7	4th	
2019–20	BYU	18–11	13–5	T–2nd	
2020–21	BYU	19–6	13–3	2nd	NCAA second round
2021–22	BYU	26–4	15–1	1st	NCAA first round
BYU (WCC):		251–96 (.723)	130–44 (.747)		
Total:		456–204 (.691)			
National champion Postseason invitational champion Conference regular season champion Conference regular season and conference tournament champion Division regular season champion Division regular season and conference tournament champion Conference tournament champion
