= BYU Cougars women's basketball =

2026–27 BYU Cougars women's basketball team
- University: Brigham Young University
- First season: 1972–1973
- Athletic director: Brian Santiago
- Head coach: Lee Cummard (2nd season)
- Location: Provo, Utah
- Arena: Marriott Center (capacity: 17,978)
- Conference: Big 12 Conference
- Nickname: Cougars
- Colors: Blue and white
- Student section: The ROC
- All-time record: 934–557 (.626)

NCAA Division I tournament Sweet Sixteen
- 2002, 2014

NCAA Division I tournament appearances
- 1984, 1985, 1993, 2000, 2002, 2003, 2006, 2007, 2012, 2014, 2015, 2016, 2019, 2021, 2022

AIAW tournament second round
- 1980

AIAW tournament appearances
- 1978, 1979, 1980

Conference tournament champions
- 1993, 2002, 2012, 2015, 2019

Conference regular-season champions
- 1978, 1979, 1980, 1981, 1982, 1984, 1985, 1993, 2006, 2007, 2011, 2016, 2022

Uniforms
Home	Away

The BYU Cougars women's basketball is the team who is the women's college basketball program representing Brigham Young University (BYU) in Provo, Utah. The Cougars began female collegiate basketball competition in 1972 and they have won 18 conference championships. They currently compete in the Big 12 Conference.

== History ==
The BYU Cougars women's basketball team traces its roots to 1900, when a team was created at Brigham Young Academy, the precursor to BYU. Its official inaugural season was in 1972. From 1972 to 1977, the team was coached by Elaine Michaelis, during which time she simultaneously coached women's volleyball, field hockey, and softball at one point. The program found early success under coach Courtney Leishman, who took over in 1977, with the team winning five straight regular-season championships in the Intermountain Athletic Conference (IAC) from 1977–78 to 1981–82. The Cougars also made three appearances in the AIAW Tournament (1978, 1979, 1980), reaching the Sweet Sixteen in 1980. BYU made the transition to NCAA Division I and earned its first NCAA Tournament bid in the 1983–84 season. The Cougars competed in the High Country Athletic Conference (HCAC), Western Athletic Conference (WAC), and Mountain West Conference (MWC) during the years that followed, securing several conference titles. The team made notable NCAA Tournament appearances in the 1980s and 1990s, including a WAC Tournament Championship in 1993.

The most consistent period of success for the program came under head coach Jeff Judkins, who led the team from the 2001–02 season through 2021–22, becoming the winningest coach in program history. Judkins guided the Cougars to the NCAA Sweet Sixteen twice: 2002 and 2014. The team won multiple regular-season and tournament championships in both the Mountain West Conference and the West Coast Conference (WCC), which they joined in 2011. During their time in the WCC (2011–2023), BYU was a consistent contender, winning three WCC Tournament Championships (2012, 2015, 2019) and two WCC Regular Season Championships (2021, 2022). The BYU Cougars made a significant move in 2023, joining the Big 12 Conference.

As of 2025, the Cougars have been ranked in the AP poll a total of 38 times since 1977, with its highest rank at #15.

== Venue ==
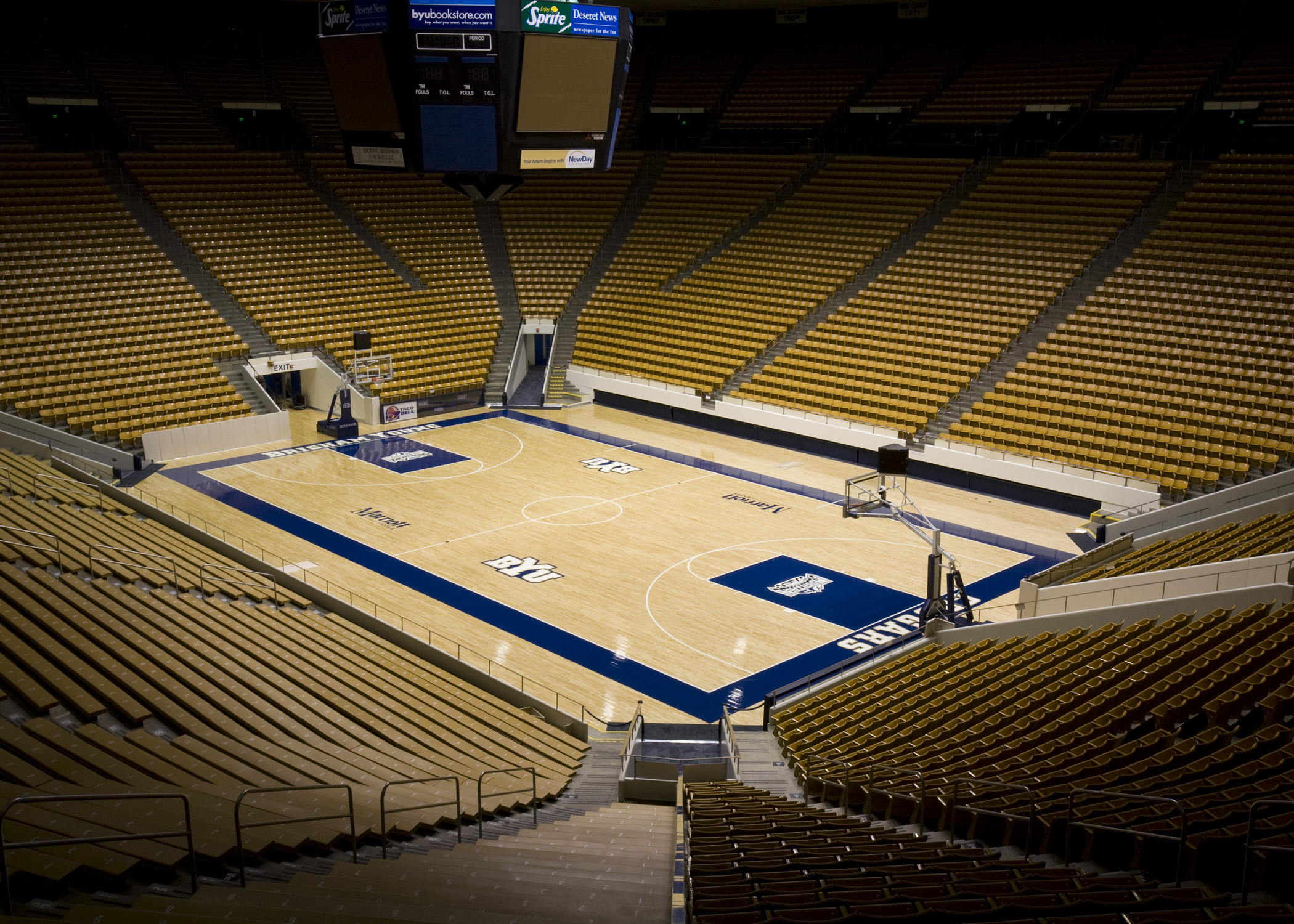
The Cougars play home games at the Marriott Center.

The Cougars play their home games in the Marriott Center, which is the largest basketball arena in the Big 12 Conference, with a capacity of 17,978.

== Coaches ==
Name	Career	Record	Pct.
Elaine Michaelis	1972–1977	48–28	.632
Courtney Leishman	1977–1989	219–124	.638
Jeanie Wilson	1989–1994	79–63	.556
Soni Adams	1994–1997	28–55	.337
Trent Shippen	1997–2001	72–49	.595
Jeff Judkins	2001–2022	351–162	.684
Amber Whiting	2022–2025	45–51	.469
Lee Cummard	2025–present	26–12	.700

== Players ==
The BYU women's basketball team has produced 16 All-Americans, including Tina Gunn Robison, who was the 1980 AWSF National Player of the Year. Players who have gone on to play in the WNBA include Erin Thorn, Ambrosia Anderson, and Jennifer Hamson.

== Results by season ==
Record table
Season	Coach	Overall	Conference	Standing	Postseason
Elaine Michaelis (Intermountain Athletic Conference) (1972–1977)
1972–1973	Elaine Michaelis	9–3	9–3	2nd	—
1973–1974	Elaine Michaelis	9–5	9–5	2nd	—
1974–1975	Elaine Michaelis	7–6	7–5	5th	—
1975–1976	Elaine Michaelis	11–6	10–3	2nd	—
1976–1977	Elaine Michaelis	12–8	10–3	2nd	—
Elaine Michaelis:		56–32	45–19		
Courtney Leishman (Intermountain Athletic Conference) (1977–1982)
1977–1978	Courtney Leishman	22–6	13–0	1st	AIAW First Round
1978–1979	Courtney Leishman	21–7	11–2	1st	AIAW First Round
1979–1980	Courtney Leishman	24–9	8–2	T-1st	AIAW Second Round
1980–1981	Courtney Leishman	21–8	9–1	T-1st	—
1981–1982	Courtney Leishman	24–13	7–3	1st	WNIT Third Round
Courtney Leishman:		112–43	48–8		
Courtney Leishman (High Country Athletic Conference) (1982–1990)
1982–1983	Courtney Leishman	17–8	8–2	2nd	—
1983–1984	Courtney Leishman	18–8	9–1	1st	NCAA First Round
1984–1985	Courtney Leishman	19–9	11–1	1st	NCAA First Round
1985–1986	Courtney Leishman	16–11	9–3	2nd	—
1986–1987	Courtney Leishman	16–11	9–3	2nd	—
1987–1988	Courtney Leishman	12–15	4–6	3rd	—
1988–1989	Courtney Leishman	8–19	3–7	4th	—
Courtney Leishman:		107–81	55–23		
Jeanie Wilson (High Country Athletic Conference) (1989–1990)
1989–1990	Jeanie Wilson	10–17	2–8	5th	—
Jeanie Wilson:		10–17	2–8		
Jeanie Wilson (Western Athletic Conference) (1990–1994)
1990–1991	Jeanie Wilson	8–21	3–9	5th	—
1991–1992	Jeanie Wilson	21–8	12–2	2nd	—
1992–1993	Jeanie Wilson	24–5	13–1	1st	NCAA First Round
1993–1994	Jeanie Wilson	16–12	10–4	2nd	—
Jeanie Wilson:		79–63	40–24		
Soni Adams (Western Athletic Conference) (1994–1997)
1994–1995	Soni Adams	8–19	4–10	7th	—
1995–1996	Soni Adams	9–18	3–11	7th	—
1996–1997	Soni Adams	11–18	7–9	5th	—
Soni Adams:		28–55	14–30		
Trent Shippen (Western Athletic Conference) (1997–1999)
1997–1998	Trent Shippen	15–14	6–8	5th	—
1998–1999	Trent Shippen	16–13	9–5	3rd	WNIT First Round
Trent Shippen:		31–27	15–13		
Trent Shippen (Mountain West Conference) (1999–2001)
1999–2000	Trent Shippen	22–9	10–4	2nd	NCAA First Round
2000–2001	Trent Shippen	19–13	8–6	3rd	WNIT Second Round
Trent Shippen:		41–22	18–10		
Jeff Judkins (Mountain West Conference) (2001–2011)
2001–2002	Jeff Judkins	24–9	10–4	3rd	NCAA Sweet Sixteen
2002–2003	Jeff Judkins	19–12	8–6	3rd	NCAA First Round
2003–2004	Jeff Judkins	15–14	5–9	6th	—
2004–2005	Jeff Judkins	19–11	9–5	3rd	WNIT First Round
2005–2006	Jeff Judkins	26–6	13–3	1st	NCAA Second Round
2006–2007	Jeff Judkins	23–10	12–4	1st	NCAA First Round
2007–2008	Jeff Judkins	13–16	7–9	5th	—
2008–2009	Jeff Judkins	18–11	8–8	5th	—
2009–2010	Jeff Judkins	23–10	11–5	2nd	WNIT Elite Eight
2010–2011	Jeff Judkins	25–9	15–1	1st	WNIT Sweet Sixteen
Jeff Judkins:		205–108	98–54		
Jeff Judkins (West Coast Conference) (2011–2022)
2011–2012	Jeff Judkins	26–7	12–4	2nd	NCAA First Round
2012–2013	Jeff Judkins	23–11	11–5	3rd	WNIT Sweet Sixteen
2013–2014	Jeff Judkins	28–7	14–4	2nd	NCAA Sweet Sixteen
2014–2015	Jeff Judkins	23–10	12–6	5th	NCAA First Round
2015–2016	Jeff Judkins	26–7	16–2	1st	NCAA First Round
2016–2017	Jeff Judkins	20–12	13–5	2nd	WNIT First Round
2017–2018	Jeff Judkins	16–14	11–7	3rd	—
2018–2019	Jeff Judkins	26–7	15–3	2nd	NCAA Second Round
2019–2020	Jeff Judkins	14–9	9–4	2nd	Cancelled (COVID)
2020–2021	Jeff Judkins	19–6	13–3	2nd	NCAA Second Round
2021–2022	Jeff Judkins	26–4	15–1	1st	NCAA Second Round
Jeff Judkins:		251–96	141–47		
Amber Whiting (West Coast Conference) (2022–2023)
2022–2023	Amber Whiting	16–17	9–9	T-4th	WNIT First Round
Amber Whiting:		16–17	9–9		
Amber Whiting (Big 12 Conference) (2023–2025)
2023–2024	Amber Whiting	16–17	6–12	T–9th	WBIT First Round
2024–2025	Amber Whiting	13–17	4–14	T–12th	—
Amber Whiting:		29–34	10–26		
Lee Cummard (Big 12 Conference) (2025–present)
2025–2026	Lee Cummard	26–12	9–9	T–9th	WBIT Runner-Up
Lee Cummard:		26–12	9–9		
Total:		981–590			
National champion Postseason invitational champion Conference regular season champion Conference regular season and conference tournament champion Division regular season champion Division regular season and conference tournament champion Conference tournament champion

== Postseason appearances ==
=== NCAA Division I ===
BYU has reached the NCAA Division I women's basketball tournament fifteen times. They have a record of 7–15.

Year	Seed	Round	Opponent	Result
1984	#8	First Round	#1 USC	L 72–97
1985	#8	First Round	#1 Long Beach State	L 85–112
1993	#12	First Round	#5 UC Santa Barbara	L 79–88
2000	#12	First Round	#5 Oklahoma	L 81–86
2002	#11	First Round; Second Round; Sweet Sixteen	#6 Florida #3 Iowa State #2 Tennessee	W 90–52; W 75–69; L 57–68
2003	#11	First Round	#6 Colorado	L 45–84
2006	#7	First Round; Second Round	#10 Iowa #2 Oklahoma	W 67–62; L 70–86
2007	#11	First Round	#6 Louisville	L 54–80
2012	#10	First Round	#7 DePaul	L 55–59
2014	#12	First Round; Second Round; Sweet Sixteen	#5 NC State #4 Nebraska #1 Connecticut	W 72–57; W 80–76; L 51–70
2015	#14	First Round	#3 Louisville	L 53–86
2016	#7	First Round	#10 Missouri	L 69–78
2019	#7	First Round; Second Round	#10 Auburn #2 Stanford	W 73–64; L 63–72
2021	#11	First Round; Second Round	#6 Rutgers #3 Arizona	W 69–66; L 46–52
2022	#6	First Round	#11 Villanova	L 57–61

=== WBIT ===
BYU has made the WBIT two times. They are 4–2, reaching as far as the championship game in 2026 and losing in the Championship game to the Columbia Lions.

Year	Seed	Round	Opponent	Result
2024	NS	First Round	#4 Santa Clara	L 59–60
2026	#1	First Round; Second Round; Quarterfinals; Semifinals; Finals	Alabama A&M #4 Missouri #2 Stanford #2 Kansas #4 Columbia	W 72–47; W 93–75; W 76–61; W 70–67; L 64–81

=== WNIT ===
BYU has made the Women's National Invitation Tournament nine times and has a 10-9 record
