= 2015 NCAA Division I women's basketball tournament =

Women's basketball championship

- Season: 2014–15
- Teams: 64
- Finals site: Amalie Arena, Tampa, Florida
- Champions: UConn Huskies (10th title, 10th title game, 16th Final Four)
- Runner-up: Notre Dame Fighting Irish (5th title game, 7th Final Four)
- Semifinalists: Maryland Terrapins (5th Final Four); South Carolina Gamecocks (1st Final Four)
- Winning coach: Geno Auriemma (10th title)
- MOP: Breanna Stewart (UConn)

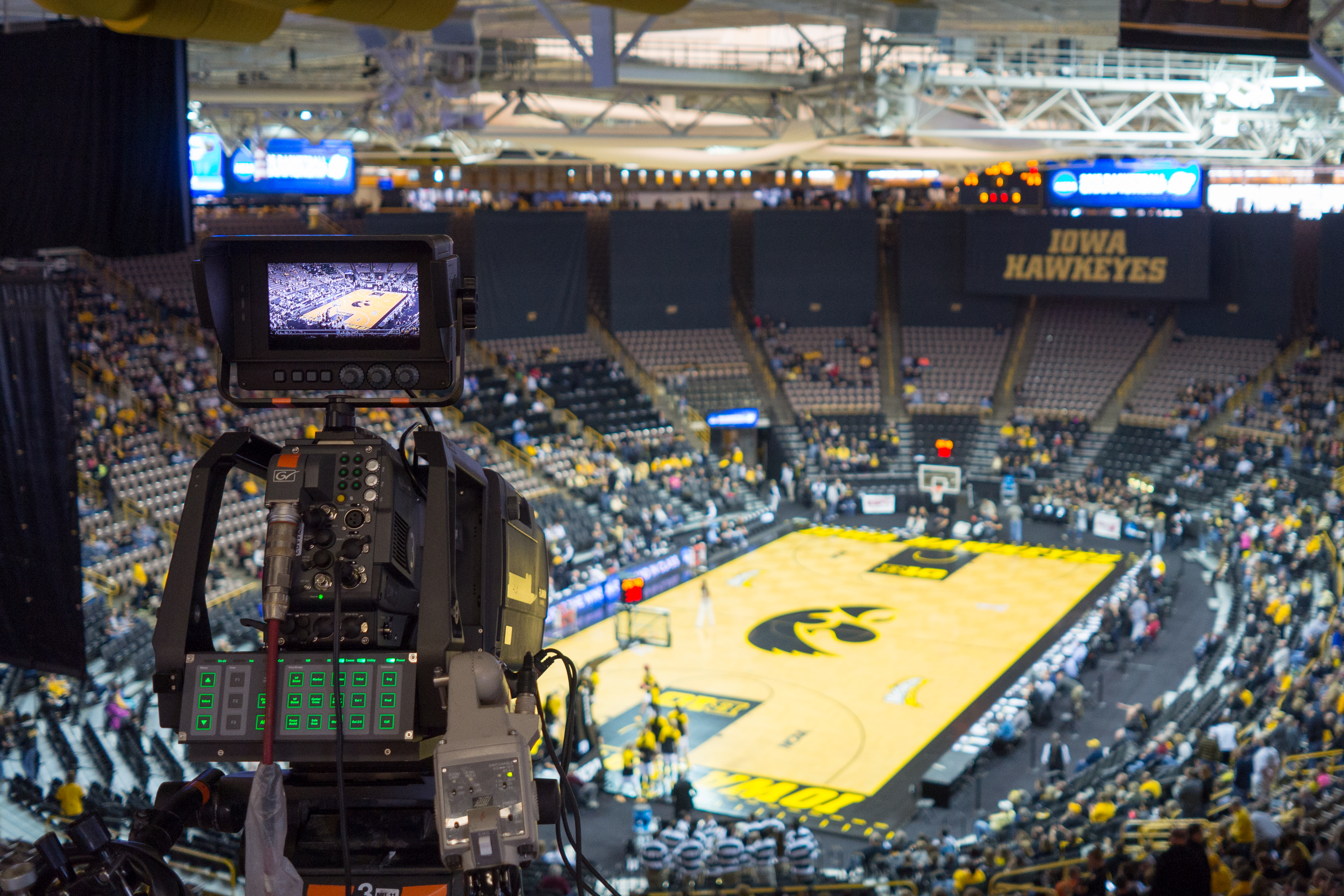
Iowa vs. Miami in the second round

The 2015 NCAA Division I women's basketball tournament was played between March and April 2015, with the Final Four played April 5 & 7. The regional locations, after a one-year experiment allowing tournament teams to host, returned to four neutral sites: Oklahoma City, Spokane, Greensboro and Albany. The subregionals were played 20–23 March, while the regionals were played 27–30 March. This represented a change; in the past, the rounds were played starting on a Saturday and ending on a Tuesday. In 2015, the opening rounds and regionals (but not the Final Four) were played starting on a Friday and ending on a Monday. The Final Four was played at Amalie Arena in Tampa, Florida. For only the third time in history, all four of the number one seeds made it to the Final Four.

Tennessee continued its record streak of making every NCAA women's basketball tournament at 34 consecutive appearances. UConn also continued its record streak of eight consecutive Final Four appearances.

== Tournament procedure ==
Pending any changes to the format, a total of 64 teams will enter the 2016 tournament. 32 automatic bids shall be awarded to each program that wins their conference's tournament. The remaining 36 bids are "at-large", with selections extended by the NCAA Selection Committee. The tournament is split into four regional tournaments, and each regional has teams seeded from 1 to 16, with the committee ostensibly making every region as comparable to the others as possible. The top-seeded team in each region plays the #16 team, the #2 team plays the #15, etc. (meaning where the two seeds add up to 17, that team will be assigned to play another).

The basis for the subregionals returned to the approach used between 1982 and 2002; the top sixteen teams, as chosen in the bracket selection process, hosted the first two rounds on campus.

The selection committee assigned seeds to the entire field from 1 to 64.

== Schedule and venues ==
The subregionals were played from 20–23 March 2015.

2015 NCAA subregionals: Fri/Sun (green), Sat/Mon (blue) (Hover over city to see link to Host)
2015 NCAA Regionals (blue) and Final Four (red) (Hover over city to see link to arena)

The basis for the subregionals returned to the approach used between 1982 and 2002; the top sixteen teams, as chosen in the bracket selection process, hosted the first two rounds on campus. The following sites were selected to host each round of the 2015 tournament:

First and Second Rounds (Subregionals)

- March 20 and 22
  - Haas Pavilion, Berkeley, California (Host: California)
  - Colonial Life Arena, Columbia, South Carolina (Host: South Carolina)
  - Gill Coliseum, Corvallis, Oregon (Host: Oregon State)
  - Cameron Indoor Stadium, Durham, North Carolina (Host: Duke)
  - Carver–Hawkeye Arena, Iowa City, Iowa (Host: Iowa)
  - Memorial Coliseum, Lexington, Kentucky (Host: Kentucky)
  - Edmund P. Joyce Center, Notre Dame, Indiana (Host: Notre Dame)
  - Ferrell Center, Waco, Texas (Host: Baylor)
- March 21 and 23
  - Carmichael Arena, Chapel Hill, North Carolina (Host: North Carolina)
  - Xfinity Center, College Park, Maryland (Host: Maryland)
  - Thompson–Boling Arena, Knoxville, Tennessee (Host: Tennessee)
  - Maples Pavilion, Stanford, California (Host: Stanford)
  - Harry A. Gampel Pavilion, Storrs, Connecticut (Host: Connecticut)
  - Donald L. Tucker Civic Center, Tallahassee, Florida (Host: Florida State)
  - USF Sun Dome, Tampa, Florida (Host: South Florida)
  - Wells Fargo Arena, Tempe, Arizona (Host: Arizona State)

Regional semifinals and finals (Sweet Sixteen and Elite Eight)

- March 27 and 29
  - Oklahoma City Regional, Chesapeake Energy Arena, Oklahoma City Host: Oklahoma and OKC All Sports Association
  - Greensboro Regional, Greensboro Coliseum, Greensboro, North Carolina Host: ACC
- March 28 and 30
  - Spokane Regional, Spokane Veterans Memorial Arena, Spokane, Washington Host: Washington State
  - Albany Regional, Times Union Center, Albany, New York Host: Siena College MAAC

National semifinals and championship (Final Four and championship)

- April 5 and 7
  - Amalie Arena, Tampa, Florida, Host: South Florida.

This was the second time that Tampa had hosted a Women's Final Four Basketball tournament; the prior time was in 2008.

== Subregionals tournament & automatic qualifiers ==
=== Automatic qualifiers ===
The following teams automatically qualified for the 2015 NCAA field by virtue of winning their conference's tournament (except for the Ivy League, whose regular-season champion received the automatic bid).

Conference	Team	Appearance	Last bid
ACC	Notre Dame	22nd	2014
America East	Albany	4th	2014
American	Connecticut	27th	2014
Atlantic 10	George Washington	16th	2003
Atlantic Sun	Florida Gulf Coast	3rd	2014
Big 12	Baylor	14th	2014
Big East	DePaul	20th	2014
Big Sky	Montana	21st	2013
Big South	Liberty	16th	2013
Big Ten	Maryland	23rd	2014
Big West	Cal State Northridge	3rd	2014
Colonial	James Madison	11th	2014
C-USA	Western Kentucky	18th	2014
Horizon	Green Bay	15th	2013
Ivy League	Princeton	5th	2013
MAAC	Quinnipiac	2nd	2013
MAC	Ohio	3rd	1995
MEAC	Savannah State	1st	Never
Missouri Valley	Wichita State	3rd	2014
Mountain West	Boise State	3rd	2007
Northeast	St. Francis Brooklyn	1st	Never
Ohio Valley	Tennessee State	3rd	1995
Pac-12	Stanford	29th	2014
Patriot	American	1st	Never
SEC	South Carolina	12th	2014
Southern	Chattanooga	13th	2014
Southland	Northwestern State	4th	2014
SWAC	Alabama State	2nd	2003
Summit	South Dakota State	6th	2013
Sun Belt	Arkansas-Little Rock	4th	2012
West Coast	BYU	11th	2014
WAC	New Mexico State	3rd	1988

=== Tournament seeds ===
Albany RegionalTimes Union Center, Albany
Seed	School	Conference	Record	RPI	Berth type
1	UConn	American	32–1	5	Automatic
2	Kentucky	SEC	23–9	8	At-large
3	Louisville	ACC	25–6	7	At-large
4	California	Pac-12	23–9	24	At-large
5	Texas	Big 12	22–10	21	At-large
6	South Florida	American	26–7	26	At-large
7	Dayton	Atlantic 10	25–6	13	At-large
8	Rutgers	Big Ten	22–9	43	At-large
9	Seton Hall	Big East	28–5	39	At-large
10	Iowa State	Big 12	18–12	57	At-large
11	LSU	SEC	17–13	58	At-large
12	Western Kentucky	Conference USA	30–4	28	Automatic
13	Wichita State	Missouri Valley	29–4	37	Automatic
14	BYU	West Coast	23–9	51	Automatic
15	Tennessee State	Ohio Valley	18–12	157	Automatic
16	St. Francis Brooklyn	Northeast	15–18	244	Automatic

Oklahoma City RegionalChesapeake Energy Arena, Oklahoma City
Seed	School	Conference	Record	RPI	Berth type
1	Notre Dame	ACC	31–2	1	Automatic
2	Baylor	Big 12	30–3	4	Automatic
3	Iowa	Big Ten	24–7	9	At-large
4	Stanford	Pac-12	24–9	18	Automatic
5	Oklahoma	Big 12	20–11	23	At-large
6	Washington	Pac-12	23–9	33	At-large
7	Northwestern	Big Ten	23–8	34	At-large
8	Minnesota	Big Ten	23–9	44	At-large
9	DePaul	Big East	26–7	38	Automatic
10	Arkansas	SEC	17–13	42	At-large
11	Miami (FL)	ACC	19–12	65	At-large
12	Quinnipiac	MAAC	31–3	25	Automatic
13	Cal State Northridge	Big West	23–9	70	Automatic
14	American	Patriot	24–8	49	Automatic
15	Northwestern State	Southland	19–14	191	Automatic
16	Montana	Big Sky	24–8	88	Automatic

Spokane RegionalSpokane Veterans Memorial Arena, Spokane
Seed	School	Conference	Record	RPI	Berth type
1	Maryland	Big Ten	30–2	6	Automatic
2	Tennessee	SEC	27–5	2	At-large
3	Oregon State	Pac-12	26–4	19	At-large
4	Duke	ACC	21–10	15	At-large
5	Mississippi State	SEC	26–6	31	At-large
6	George Washington	Atlantic 10	29–3	11	Automatic
7	Chattanooga	Southern	29–3	20	Automatic
8	Princeton	Ivy League	30–0	12	Automatic
9	Green Bay	Horizon	28–4	22	Automatic
10	Pittsburgh	ACC	19–11	41	At-large
11	Gonzaga	West Coast	24–7	40	At-large
12	Tulane	American	22–10	52	At-large
13	Albany	America East	24–8	77	Automatic
14	South Dakota State	Summit	24–8	47	Automatic
15	Boise State	Mountain West	22–10	112	Automatic
16	New Mexico State	WAC	22–7	97	Automatic

Greensboro RegionalGreensboro Coliseum, Greensboro
Seed	School	Conference	Record	RPI	Berth type
1	South Carolina	SEC	30–2	3	Automatic
2	Florida State	ACC	29–4	10	At-large
3	Arizona State	Pac-12	27–5	17	At-large
4	North Carolina	ACC	24–8	16	At-large
5	Ohio State	Big Ten	23–10	30	At-large
6	Texas A&M	SEC	23–9	32	At-large
7	Florida Gulf Coast	Atlantic Sun	30–2	14	Automatic
8	Syracuse	ACC	21–9	35	At-large
9	Nebraska	Big Ten	21–10	36	At-large
10	Oklahoma State	Big 12	20–11	46	At-large
11	Arkansas–Little Rock	Sun Belt	28–4	29	Automatic
12	James Madison	Colonial	29–3	27	Automatic
13	Liberty	Big South	26–6	63	Automatic
14	Ohio	MAC	27–4	50	Automatic
15	Alabama State	SWAC	17–14	250	Automatic
16	Savannah State	MEAC	21–10	138	Automatic

== Tournament records ==
- Most three-point field goals—Connecticut hit 54 three-pointers over the course of the tournament, the most ever recorded in a tournament. Stanford set a new record in 2021 with 59 three point field goals.

== Bracket ==
* – Denotes overtime period

Unless otherwise noted, all times listed are Eastern Daylight Time (UTC−04).

=== Albany Regional – Albany, New York ===
==== First round ====
- Alexis Govan and Chastity Gooch combined for 45 points, as Western Kentucky sunk a school record 12 threes, while putting a scare into Texas; however, Texas managed to escape with two free throws from Brooke McCarty with 20.8 seconds remaining to put Texas ahead for good 66–64.
- Rutgers managed to knock out in-state rival, Seton Hall, behind 21 points each from Kahleah Copper and Tyler Scaife. Rutgers managed to keep Seton Hall to 35.9% shooting; however, the game was largely lost when Seton Hall shot just 12–23 from the Free Throw line, as Daisha Simmons fell to her former team in her penultimate season.
- Kentucky easily defeated Tennessee State 97–52, with six Wildcats scoring in double digits. After each team scored three points, Kentucky scored 16 consecutive to build a lead they would never relinquish.
- Dayton pulled out to a seventeen-point lead in the second half. Iowa State cut the lead back to seven points with under three minutes remaining, but could not get any closer, and the Flyers went on to win 78–66. Dayton's Ally Malott scored 18 points and recorded 12 rebounds to help the Flyers win.
- California and Wichita State were tied at eight points each, and Wichita State was within two points with under five minutes to go in the first half, but the Golden Bears opened up a ten-point lead at halftime over the Shockers. Wichita State would get as close to within four points, but California then extended the lead and ended with a twelve-point win 78–66. Cal's Reshanda Gray scored 22 points and left the game to a standing ovation.
- Connecticut's Morgan Tuck did not play in the prior year's NCAA Tournament, but made up for it in the first game of this year's tournament. She had 20 points in the first half, single-handedly outscoring St. Francis. She ended up hitting 12 of her 13 shots. Sarah Benedetti, who grew up in Canton, Connecticut as a UConn fan, was the high scorer for St. Francis with 13 points. The school was playing tin their first ever NCAA Tournament. The Huskies won with a final score of 89–33.
- Louisville's Myisha Hines-Allen scored 19 points for the Cardinals. Louisville forced 30 turnovers which lead to 38 points, and the Cardinals beat BYU 86–53.
- Normally, the game between South Florida and LSU would have been held on the court of the 3 seed Louisville but the Cardinals had a scheduling conflict so South Florida hosted. Courtney Williams, playing on her home court had a double-double with 17 points and 11 rebounds, leading her team to a nine-point victory over LSU 73–64.

==== Second round ====
- Kentucky forced 24 turnovers against Dayton, but the Flyers hit 11 three-pointers to help overcome the lost possessions. Kentucky held a three-point lead at halftime, which they opened up to eight points, but Dayton responded. With the score tied at 87 points each with just over a minute to go, Dayton's Kelley Austria hit a three points. Kentucky hit two free throws, then Dayton's Amber Deane hit a three with 30 seconds left in the game. Kentucky was forced to foul but Dayton hit their last six free throw attempts to preserve the upset with a score of 99–94.
- The 4 and 5 seeds, Texas and California, played on Cal's home court. At the end of the half, the two teams were tied. The Longhorns opened the second half with a 12–0 run, but the Golden Bears closed within 4 points with 90 seconds to go in the game. But Kelsey Lang scored at the other end. Imani McGee-Stafford had a double-double for the Longhorns with 20 points and 11 rebounds and Texas held on to win 73–70, sending the team to their first Sweet Sixteen in eleven years.
- When Connecticut and Rutgers took the floor, the two head coaches, Geno Auriemma and C. Vivian Stringer had 1865 combined victories, the most combined victories by any two coaches in an NCAA Tournament game. Playing on Auriemma's birthday, the Scarlet Knights scored the first basket, but that was the last time they would lead in the game. Kaleena Mosqueda-Lewis scored 23, and Moriah Jefferson 19 to lead the Huskies to a 91–55 win.
- The 3 seed Louisville faced the 6 seed South Florida. The first half was close most of the way, with the Cardinals holding on to a slim, five point lead at halftime. Louisville extended the lead to nine in the second half, but the Bulls responded, and took a one-point lead just before the final media time-out of the game. Louisville's Jude Schimmel scored eight points in a three-minute stretch to give the lead back to the Cardinals, and help secure the 60–52 win.

===== Sweet Sixteen =====
- Connecticut had a seven-point lead midway through the first half, when they scored 13 consecutive points against Texas, which they extended into a 44–9 run to blow the game open. Stewart had 31 points as the Huskies rolled to a 105–54 win over the Longhorns. The victory was a milestone for coach Geno Auriemma, representing his 100th victory in the NCAA tournament. He is one of only two coaches, the other being Pat Summitt, with 100 or more victories in the tournament.
- Dayton, the 7 seed, faced Louisville the 3 seed. The Flyers held a slim one point lead at halftime, but outscored the Cardinals by 15 in the second half to win 82–66. Andrea Hoover scored 26 points, including 15 for 15 from the free throw line. It is the first time in regional history that a player with 12 or more attempts was perfect from the line. The Flyers, who had never before made it to a Sweet Sixteen game, moved on to the Elite Eight round.

===== Elite Eight (Regional Final) =====
- Dayton and Connecticut played close to even for the first 20 minutes, with neither team garnering more than a five-point margin. The Huskies had a five-point lead with three minutes to go in the half, but the Flyers scored the next six points to take a lead at halftime, representing the first time the Huskies had been down at the half in two seasons. The Flyers made their first four three-point attempts and hit seven of their first ten shots. In the second half, the Huskies opened with a 15–3 run to take a double-digit lead. On the next possession Kaleena Mosqueda-Lewis hit a three to give her 393 in her career, an NCAA record. The 44 points given up by Connecticut in the first half is the most given up by them in the first half since 2008. Connecticut went on to win 91–70.

==== Bracket ====
First round Round of 64; March 20–21
1	UConn	89
16	St. Francis Brooklyn	33
Storrs, Connecticut – Sat/Mon
8	Rutgers	79
9	Seton Hall	66
5	Texas	66
12	Western Kentucky	64
Berkeley, California – Fri/Sun
4	California	78
13	Wichita State	66
6	South Florida	73
11	LSU	64
Tampa, Florida – Sat/Mon
3	Louisville	86
14	BYU	53
7	Dayton	78
10	Iowa State	66
Lexington, Kentucky – Fri/Sun
2	Kentucky	97
15	Tennessee State	52

Second round Round of 32; March 22–23
1	UConn	91
8	Rutgers	55
5	Texas	73
4	California	70
6	South Florida	52
3	Louisville	60
7	Dayton	99
2	Kentucky	94

Regional semifinals Sweet 16; March 28
1	UConn	105
5	Texas	54
3	Louisville	66
7	Dayton	82

Regional finals Elite 8 March 30
1	UConn	91
7	Dayton	70

==== Regional Final summary ====
ESPN

March 30
7:00 pm EDT

Summary

#7 Dayton Flyers 70, #1 UConn Huskies 91
Scoring by half: 44–43, 26–48
Pts: Malott – 14; Rebs: Cornelie – 6 Asts: Austria – 5	Pts: Mosqueda-Lewis – 27; Rebs: Stewart – 16; Asts: Jefferson – 6

Times Union Center • Albany, New York
Attendance: 7,686
Referees: Michael Price, Eric Brewton, Karen Preato

==== Albany Regional all-tournament team ====
- Breanna Stewart – Connecticut – Most Outstanding Player
- Kaleena Mosqueda-Lewis – Connecticut
- Moriah Jefferson – Connecticut
- Andrea Hoover – Dayton
- Ally Malott – Dayton

=== Spokane Regional – Spokane, Washington ===
==== First round ====
- Undefeated Princeton came into the game as an 8 seed against the 9 seed Green Bay. The Phoenix had a single point lead at the half, with President Barack Obama in the stands to watch his niece Leslie Robinson, a Princeton forward, although she did not play. The Tigers played better in the second half, and kept their winning streak alive with an 80–70 win. Michelle Miller led Princeton with 20 points, including a perfect 4 of 4 from behind the arc. Miller was supported by a cast which saw five Tigers in double figures, that countered a 21-point effort from Mehryn Kraker.
- #13 Albany fell just short of stunning #4 Duke. Rebecca Greenwell orchestrated the rescue of Duke's season, as she tallied 20 points, including what proved to be a game winning 3-pointer with just 17 seconds left. Azurá Stevens sunk one free throw in order to create the final margin, as Albany fell 54–52.
- The 3 seed Oregon State played the 14 seed South Dakota State, knowing that a three seed has never lost a first-round game in the NCAA D1 women's tournament. However, the Jackrabbits led much of the first half, as much as by seven points 28–21 with just over five minutes to go in the first half. The Beavers, still trailing at halftime, tied up the game early in the second half and gradually extended the lead to double digits. Oregon State, with 23 points from Sydney Wiese, went on to win 74–62.
- The 5 seed Mississippi State had a small, five point lead at halftime, but Tulane came back and took a two-point lead early in the second half. The Bulldogs coach, Vic Schaefer, took a timeout and challenged his team to play their best. The responded and took a double digit lead. The Green Wave cut the lead to nine, but could not get closer, and Mississippi State went on to win 57–47.
- 11th seeded Gonzaga opened with the first seven points of the game over 6th seeded George Washington, and later in the first half, went on a 17–1 run to double up the Colonials 38–19. Late in the second half, George Washington cut the lead to six points, but Gonzaga's Sunny Greinacher hit a three-pointer on the next possession to extend the lead the nine points. Gonzaga held on for the upset win 82–69.
- The top seeded team in the region, Maryland took on the 16 seed New Mexico State. The Terrapins center hit seven of her ten shots from the field and eight of nine from the free throw line. She left the game with just under six minutes left with 22 points, only two points off her career high. Maryland won 75–57 to win a school record 25th consecutive game. Their next opponent, Princeton, is undefeated with a 31-game winning streak.
- The second seeded Tennessee faced 15 seed Boise State. The Lady Vols had a seven-point lead at halftime which they extended to 13 in the second half but the Broncos cut the lead to five with under three minutes left. Tennessee's Bashaara Graves had a career-high 24 points and the team had a late 8–0 run to preserve the win 72–61.

===== Second round =====
- Fresh off a first round upset, Gonzaga tried to make it two upsets in a row against Oregon State. The Zags had a three-point lead at the half, which they extended to a dozen in the second half, but the Beavers fought back and tied the game at 64 points each on a Jamie Weisner three with three and a half minutes to go in the game. However, that would be the last score for Oregon State as Gonzaga scored the final 12 points of the game to win 76–64.
- Mississippi State, the 5 seed, took on the 4 seed Duke on their home court, but led by four at the half, and extended the lead to six early in the second half. That's when the Blue Devils took over, scoring 12 consecutive points as part of a 26–5 run that put Duke decisively in the lead. Azurá Stevens, a freshman for Duke, had a double-double with 22 points and 10 rebounds to help Duke advance with a score of 64–56.
- Princeton brought their undefeated record, and best known fan (President Barack Obama) to take on the 1 Seed Maryland. Despite playing the top seed, the Tigers led by 4 points, 28–24, as late as 14 minutes into the first half. Then the second half started, and the Terrapins hit 56% of their field goal attempts including seven of eight from beyond the arc to take over the game. Maryland ended Princeton's win streak 85–70.
- Tennessee had an 11–0 run early in the first half to open up an early lead and reached halftime with a 12-point margin. Pittsburgh tried for a comeback and got the margin down to four points 69–65. but that occurred with only 38 seconds left in the game. Tennessee's Ariel Massengale hit six consecutive free throws and had a steal to seal the ten point win 77–67.

====== Sweet Sixteen ======
- Maryland faced Duke, the first time the two team have played since Maryland transferred to the Big Ten. The Terrapins' Laurin Mincy scored all of her 15 points in the first half, while Shatori Walker-Kimbrough scored 18 of her 24 points in the second half, to help lead Maryland to a ten-point victory, 65–55, over the Blue Devils.
- Gonzaga had upsets in their first two games, and were looking to make it a third against Tennessee. The Zags had a lead as large as eight points in the first half, but the Lady Vols tied the game at halftime. In the second half, the Zags again took the lead. Tennessee only managed one basket in the first eight minutes of the half, and built a lead which grew to 17 points. The Lady Vols came back, never led, but tied up the game late at 63 points each to send the game to the tournament's first overtime match. Tennessee would not hit a basket in overtime, but hit ten free throws to win the game 73–69.

====== Elite Eight (Regional Final) ======
- Tennessee took an early lead in their game against Maryland, scoring the first 5 points, and led 9–2 six minutes into the game. The Terrapins came back and the teams traded leads in the first half with Maryland taking a one-point lead into halftime. The Lady Vols led by five points early in the second half, then the teams traded leads again. It wasn't until four and a half minutes left in the game that Lexie Brown hit a three-pointer to put Maryland in the lead for good. Tennessee had a chance at tying the game with under a minute to go, but missed a three-pointer. Maryland then sank seven of eight free throws to close the half and win 58–48.

==== Bracket ====
First round Round of 64; March 20–21
1	Maryland	75
16	New Mexico State	57
College Park, Maryland – Sat/Mon
8	Princeton	80
9	Green Bay	70
5	Mississippi State	57
12	Tulane	47
Durham, North Carolina – Fri/Sun
4	Duke	54
13	Albany	52
6	George Washington	69
11	Gonzaga	82
Corvallis, Oregon – Fri/Sun
3	Oregon State	74
14	South Dakota State	62
7	Chattanooga	40
10	Pittsburgh	51
Knoxville, Tennessee – Sat/Mon
2	Tennessee	72
15	Boise State	61

Second round Round of 32; March 22–23
1	Maryland	85
8	Princeton	70
5	Mississippi State	56
4	Duke	64
11	Gonzaga	76
3	Oregon State	64
10	Pittsburgh	67
2	Tennessee	77

Regional semifinals Sweet 16; March 28
1	Maryland	65
4	Duke	55
11	Gonzaga	69
2	Tennessee	73*

Regional finals Elite 8 March 30
1	Maryland	58
2	Tennessee	48

==== Regional Final summary ====
ESPN

March 30
6:00 pm PDT

Summary

#2 Tennessee Lady Volunteers 48, #1 Maryland Terrapins 58
Scoring by half: 21–22, 27–36
Pts: Massengale – 16; Rebs: Graves, Reynolds – 7 Asts: Burdick – 4	Pts: Brown – 15; Rebs: Jones – 9 Asts: Mincy – 5

Spokane Arena • Spokane, Washington
Attendance: 5,032
Referees: Lisa Mattingly, Roy Gulbeyan, Kyle Bacon

==== Spokane Regional all-tournament team ====
- Shatori Walker-Kimbrough – Maryland – Most Outstanding Player
- Sunny Greinacher – Gonzaga
- Brionna Jones – Maryland
- Ariel Massengale – Tennessee
- Cierra Burdick – Tennessee

=== Oklahoma City Regional – Oklahoma City ===
==== First round ====
- Montana was fourth in the nation in field goal defense, holding their opponents to under 34% on average. However, they were not ready for Notre Dame, who hit 62% of their shots. Jewell Loyd scored 18 points, and the Irish beat the Lady Griz 77–43.
- The Baylor team watched their men's counterpart lose in an upset to a 14 seed the day before, which filled them with resolve to ensure it did not happen to them. After an early 7–7 tie, they went on a 14–2 run to open up a large lead against Northwestern State they would never relinquish. The Lady Bears held the Lady Demons to 24% shooting from the field and won easily, 77–36.
- Although the 3 seed Iowa started out 8–2 against the 14 seed American on their home court, the Eagles responded and led by as many as five in the first half. The Hawkeyes responded and tied the game up at the half. The second half would remain close, but Iowa took a lead that they never gave up, and ended with an eight-point win 75–67.
- Arkansas was the 10 seed, playing under first year coach Jimmy Dykes, a former Razorback. Arkansas led 9–2 early but Northwestern tied it up and the team remained close until tied at half-time. Northwestern scored the first six points of the second half, and extended the lead out to 13 just before the midpoint of the half, but the Razorbacks came back. The game was tied at 55 points each when, with 30 seconds left, Jessica Jackson hit one of two free throws. Each team would have additional chances, but no more baskets would be scored, only an additional free throw with two seconds left in the game to give Arkansas the upset 57–55.
- Four seed Stanford had all they could handle playing the 13 seed Cal State Northridge. Playing on Stanford's home court, Maples Arena, Stanford opened up a ten-point lead in the first half, but then went scoreless for eight minutes. The Matadors held a one-point lead at halftime, and extended the lead to six in the second half. Then the Cardinal scored eight straight points to take a lead they would never give up. Stanford won 73–60.
- 12 seed Quinnipiac came into their game against Oklahoma on a 21-game winning streak, but had not played a team with the speed and size of the Sooners. Oklahoma had a 17-point lead at halftime. The Bobcats would cut the lead to seven, but the Sooners took over and won 111–84.
- Miami was the 11 seed, but they had beaten one of the top seeds, Notre Dame, in the regular season, so they had the talent to play with the best. The Hurricanes Adrienne Motley scored 30 points, while the Washington Huskies best scorers Kelsey Plum and Jazmine Davis were a combined 10 for 30 from the field. The Huskies got to within three points in the second half, but Miami held on to win 86–80.
- DePaul took on Minnesota in the 8–9 game. Despite being down by double digits at halftime, The Blue Demons coach, Doug Bruno, thought his team was in a good place; that they had exhausted the Golden Gophers. Minnesota's Amanda Zahui B. recorded 22 rebounds, one off the NCAA record, along with 21 points, but it was not enough, and DePaul came back to win the game 79–72.

===== Second round =====
- DePaul opened with a press against the top seed Notre Dame and was initially successful, forcing four turnovers in the first five possessions, but the Irish settled down and opened up a six-point lead in the first half, which they doubled in the second half. Notre Dame's Michaela Mabrey scored 19 points, including five of seven three-point shots to help lead the Irish to the 79–67 win over the Blue Demons.
- Arkansas played roughly even with Baylor in the beginning of the game, with three ties and ten lead changes and were still holding onto a lead nine minutes into the half. But the Lady Bears ended the half on a 30–7 run to reach a 20-point lead, and expanded the lead by nine more points in the second half. Baylor won the game over the Razorbacks, 73–44.
- Iowa faced Miami in the second round, knowing they had failed to reach the Sweet Sixteen in their last seven tries. However, in many of those games, the Hawkeyes were an 8 or 9 seed, and went on to play the top seed in the region. This year, Iowa was a 3 seed, facing the 11th-seeded Hurricanes. The Hawkeyes hit 2/3 of their shots in the second half, extending a seven-point halftime lead to 17 and won the game 88–70.
- Oklahoma led Stanford by four points at the end of the first half, a half in which Stanford's Bonnie Samuelson failed to score. She made up for that in the second half, scoring 19 points. That, along with Amber Orrange's 24 points helped the Cardinal beat the Sooners by ten points, 86–76, sending Stanford to their eighth consecutive Sweet Sixteen.

==== Sweet Sixteen ====
- Baylor's Sune Agbuke had a scoring average of just under six points per game and a career high of 16 points, but she scored 23 points for the Bears. Teammate Nina Davis contributed 20 points, and Iowa fell to Baylor 81–66. Iowa's Samantha Logic had a triple double with 13 points, 10 rebounds and 14 assists for the Hawkeyes, but it was not enough.
- Hall of Fame coaches Tara VanDerveer and Muffet McGraw had never before met in the post-season, and the two teams, Stanford and Notre Dame, had only met twice previously, with Stanford winning in 1990 and 1991. Notre Dame's Lindsay Allen, who averages just under ten points a game, matched her career high of 24 in the first half, and ended with 28 points. Jewell Loyd scored 21, and the Irish ended up with a double-digit lead by halftime, and extended the lead by ten more to win 81–60.

===== Elite Eight (Regional Final) =====
- Notre Dame and Baylor, the one and two seeds in the region, faced off for the opportunity to go to the Final Four. Baylor led early, by as much as nine points 26–17 in the first half but the Irish came back to take a two-point lead at halftime. The Bears retook the lead in the second half, and were still leading at the second media timeout with 12 minutes to go in the game when Jewell Loyd made a layup to give the Irish a lead they would not relinquish. Notre Dame ended with the win 77–68.

==== Bracket ====
First round Round of 64; March 20–21
1	Notre Dame	77
16	Montana	43
Notre Dame, Indiana – Fri/Sun
8	Minnesota	72
9	DePaul	79
5	Oklahoma	111
12	Quinnipiac	84
Stanford, California – Sat/Mon
4	Stanford	73
13	Cal State Northridge	60
6	Washington	80
11	Miami (FL)	86
Iowa City, Iowa – Fri/Sun
3	Iowa	75
14	American	67
7	Northwestern	55
10	Arkansas	57
Waco, Texas – Fri/Sun
2	Baylor	77
15	Northwestern State	36

Second round Round of 32; March 22–23
1	Notre Dame	79
9	DePaul	67
5	Oklahoma	76
4	Stanford	86
11	Miami	70
3	Iowa	88
10	Arkansas	44
2	Baylor	73

Regional semifinals Sweet 16; March 27
1	Notre Dame	81
4	Stanford	60
3	Iowa	66
2	Baylor	81

Regional finals Elite 8 March 29
1	Notre Dame	77
2	Baylor	68

==== Regional Final summary ====
ESPN

March 29
7:30 pm CDT

Summary

#2 Baylor Lady Bears 68, #1 Notre Dame Fighting Irish 77
Scoring by half: 37–39, 31–38
Pts: Davis – 26; Rebs: Davis – 13; Asts: Johnson – 10	Pts: Allen – 23; Rebs: Turner – 10; Asts: Allen – 23

Chesapeake Energy Arena • Oklahoma City
Attendance: 3,329
Referees: Dee Kantner, Brenda Pantoja, Doug Knight

==== Oklahoma City Regional all-tournament team ====
- Lindsay Allen – Notre Dame – Most Outstanding Player
- Nina Davis – Baylor
- Jewell Loyd – Notre Dame
- Samantha Logic – Iowa
- Niya Johnson – Baylor

=== Greensboro Regional – Greensboro, North Carolina ===
==== First round ====
- Despite leading by 13 points at the end of the first half, South Carolina's coach Dawn Staley was not happy with the team's performance. Aleighsa Welch urged her teammates to "do something about it" and the team put together a 21–1 run early in the second half to put Savannah State away. The Gamecocks won, 81–48.
- Syracuse and Nebraska were the 8th and 9th seeds, meaning the selection committee viewed them as comparable. They lived up to expectations, reaching the end of the first half tied. The go-ahead basket was scored by Syracuse with less than a minute remaining in the game, and the Orange defeated the Cornhuskers, 72–69.
- Florida State opened up an 18-point lead over Alabama State by halftime, and continued to extend the lead in the second half. The Seminoles forced 32 turnovers, including 18 steals which led to a 91–49 win, resulting in the first-ever 30-win season by Florida State.
- Arizona State played a home game in the NCAA tournament for the first time in a decade, opening up a 16-point lead by halftime. The Sun Devils' Katie Hempen scored 23 points, a career high, and Sophie Brunner added 14 points, as Arizona State extended the lead in the second half against Ohio. Although the Bobcats were a good three-point shooting team, they converted only 4 of 16 attempts. Arizona State beat Ohio by 19, 74–55.
- The 4th seed North Carolina had a lead of 14 points at halftime over the 13th seed Liberty, but the Flames used a 52–35 rebounding advantage to make the game closer in the second half. Liberty cut the lead to six points, but were unable to close the gap, and failed to win their first ever NCAA Tournament game. North Carolina held on to win, 71–65.
- The game between Florida Gulf Coast and Oklahoma State was a rematch of a 2014 NCAA Tournament first-round game. In the prior game Oklahoma State prevailed 61–60 in overtime. This year the Eagles would get their revenge, behind 26 points from Kaneisha Atwater and 19 from Whitney Knight, as FGCU won their 26th consecutive game by a score of 75–67, the third-longest active streak in NCAA DI women's basketball.
- The 11th seed Arkansas-Little Rock took on the 6th seed Texas A&M. The first half was close, with the Aggies taking a one-point lead into halftime. In a second half fueled by 25 points from Taylor Gault and 22 points from Kiera Clark, they took the lead and extended it to win by nine points, 69–60. The Aggies' Courtney Williams recorded a double-double, with 23 points and eleven rebounds but without teammate Jordan Jones, it was not enough. The win was the 700th for Trojans' coach Joe Foley.
- The 5 seed Ohio State took on the 12 seed James Madison. The Buckeyes pushed the lead to double digits several times in the second half, but the Dukes cut the lead back to single digits, and were as close as four points with just over eight minutes to go. Ameryst Alston scored 28 points, Kelsey Mitchell 23 and Alexa Hart 20 for Ohio State. The Buckeyes ended with a ten-point margin, 90–80.

===== Second round =====
- South Carolina faced Syracuse in a rematch of a game played earlier in the season. In that game, played in the Junkanoo Jam in the Bahamas, the Orange opened up a double-digit lead in the second half, before The Gamecocks responded and finished with a four-point win. This game proceeded very differently, with South Carolina leading by 28 points at the half. While the second half was roughly even the Gamecocks were too far ahead and won the game, 97–68.
- Florida Gulf Coast brought a 26-game winning streak to their match-up with Florida State, but the Seminoles were "...too big, too fast and too deep...". Florida State opened with a 17–2 run, held the Eagles to 31% shooting and a season low 47 points, and won the game, 65–47.
- After their upset in the first round, Arkansas-Little Rock took on a higher-ranked opponent in Arizona State, and initially appeared headed to another upset. The Trojans led by 16 points in the second half and by ten with under eight minutes to go. The Sun Devils slowly cut into the lead, and took their first lead since leading 2–0 with under a minute to go, on Sophie Brunner's layup. The teams traded baskets, then with seven seconds remaining in the game Katie Hempen was fouled and sank two free throws to extend the lead to three points. Alexius Dawn missed a three-pointer with a second left in the game, and Arizona State completed the comeback, 57–54.
- North Carolina took on Ohio State and pulled out to a lead as large as 23 points, before giving up the lead late in the game. OSU's Kelsey Mitchell hit a three-pointer to tie up the game with 44 seconds left, and after the Tar Heels responded with a basket, hit two free throws to tie the game again. North Carolina's Jamie Cherry hit a jumper with one second left on the clock to preserve the 86–84 victory.

===== Sweet Sixteen =====
- In the 2014 Tournament, South Carolina, as a 1 seed, faced North Carolina as a 4 seed in a Sweet Sixteen match up. North Carolina upset South Carolina in that game. This year, South Carolina was again a 1 seed and North Carolina a 4 seed, and they faced each other in a Sweet Sixteen match-up. With a minute and a half to go in the game, the Tar Heels had a three-point lead, and with under 20 seconds to go, the game was tied. The Gamecocks Tiffany Mitchell made a layup with five seconds to go in the game to prevent another upset. South Carolina won 67–65.
- In the first half, Florida State and Arizona State played even for the first seventeen minutes of the half. With just over three minutes to go in the half, the Sun Devils tied the game at 22 points each, but would not score again in the half, and the Seminoles would reach halftime with a ten-point lead. In the second half, the Sun Devils came back to within a single point when Elisha Davis hit a three-pointer with six seconds left. They would get the ball once more time, but the Seminoles' Maegan Conwright stole the ball on a final drive to the basket. Florida State won, behind a career-high 21 points from Leticia Romero 66–65.

====== Elite Eight (regional final) ======
- The top two seeds in the Greensboro regional, South Carolina and Florida State, met in the regional final. The Gamecocks hit 61% of their field goal attempt, but despite the excellent shooting, did not take a lead until about nine minutes were left in the second half. South Carolina's Tiffany Mitchell put her team ahead for good with two minutes to go, and scored seven points in the final two minutes. South Carolina won 80–74 to advance them to their first ever Final Four.

==== Bracket ====
First round Round of 64; March 20–21
1	South Carolina	81
16	Savannah State	48
Columbia, South Carolina – Fri/Sun
8	Syracuse	72
9	Nebraska	69
5	Ohio State	90
12	James Madison	80
Chapel Hill, North Carolina – Sat/Mon
4	North Carolina	71
13	Liberty	65
6	Texas A&M	60
11	Arkansas-Little Rock	69
Tempe, Arizona – Sat/Mon
3	Arizona State	74
14	Ohio	55
7	Florida Gulf Coast	75
10	Oklahoma State	67
Tallahassee, Florida – Sat/Mon
2	Florida State	91
15	Alabama State	49

Second round Round of 32; March 22–23
1	South Carolina	97
8	Syracuse	68
5	Ohio State	84
4	North Carolina	86
11	Arkansas-Little Rock	54
3	Arizona State	57
7	Florida Gulf Coast	47
2	Florida State	65

Regional semifinals Sweet 16; March 27
1	South Carolina	67
4	North Carolina	65
3	Arizona State	65
2	Florida State	66

Regional finals Elite 8 March 29
1	South Carolina	80
2	Florida State	74

==== Regional Final summary ====
ESPN

March 29
12:00 pm EDT

Box Score

#2 Florida State Seminoles 74, #1 South Carolina Gamecocks 80
Scoring by half: 41–38, 33–42
Pts: Romero – 13; Rebs: Slaughter, Romero – 7 Asts: Slaughter, Romero – 4	Pts: Mitchell – 21; Rebs: Mitchell – 6 Asts: Mitchell – 5

Greensboro Coliseum • Greensboro, North Carolina
Attendance: 6,364
Referees: Felicia Grinter, Penny Davis, Brian Enterline

==== Greensboro Regional all-tournament team ====
- Alaina Coates – South Carolina – Most Outstanding Player
- Latifah Coleman – North Carolina
- Adut Bulgak – Florida State
- Leticia Romero – Florida State
- Tiffany Mitchell – South Carolina

== Final Four ==
During the Final Four round, regardless of the seeds of the participating teams, the champion of the top overall top seed's region plays against the champion of the fourth-ranked top seed's region, and the champion of the second overall top seed's region plays against the champion of the third-ranked top seed's region. The committee placed the four No. 1 seeded teams 1 through 4 in each of the four regions, thus determining the Final Four semifinals pairings.

=== Amalie Arena — Tampa, Florida ===
National semifinals April 5
ALB1	UConn	81
SPO1	Maryland	58
OKC1	Notre Dame	66
GRN1	South Carolina	65

National Championship Game; April 7
ALB1	UConn	63
OKC1	Notre Dame	53

=== Game summaries ===
==== Final four ====
ESPN

April 5
6:30 PM EDT

Box Score

#1 South Carolina Gamecocks 65, #1 Notre Dame Fighting Irish 66
Scoring by half: 28–32, 37–34
Pts: A. Wilson – 20; Rebs: A. Welch – 14; Asts: B. Cuevas – 3	Pts: J. Loyd – 22; Rebs: B. Turner – 8 Asts: M. Mabrey – 5

Amalie Arena – Tampa, Florida
Referees: Brian Brunette, Felicia Grinter, Lisa Mattingly

ESPN

April 5
9:04 PM EDT

Box Score

#1 Maryland Terrapins 58, #1 UConn Huskies 81
Scoring by half: 33–44, 25–37
Pts: B. Jones – 14; Rebs: T. Pfirman – 5 Asts: B. Moseley – 4	Pts: B. Stewart – 25; Rebs: M. Tuck – 9 Asts: K. Mosqueda-Lewis – 7

Amalie Arena – Tampa, Florida
Attendance: 19,730
Referees: Eric Brewton, Maj Forsberg, Joseph Vaszily

==== National Championship ====
ESPN

April 7
8:30 PM EDT

Box score

#1 Notre Dame Fighting Irish 53, #1 Connecticut Huskies 63
Scoring by half: 23–31, 30–32
Pts: B. Turner – 14; Rebs: T. Reimer – 11; Asts: L. Allen – 7	Pts: M. Jefferson, K. Mosqueda-Lewis – 15; Rebs: B. Stewart – 15; Asts: M. Tuck – 7

Amalie Arena • Tampa, Florida
Attendance: 19,810
Referees: Denise Brooks, Dee Kantner, Mark Zentz

==== Final Four all-tournament team ====
- Breanna Stewart, Connecticut
- Morgan Tuck, Connecticut
- Moriah Jefferson, Connecticut
- Brianna Turner, Notre Dame
- Jewell Loyd, Notre Dame

== Record by conference ==
Conference	Bids	Record	Win %	R64	R32	S16	E8	F4	CG	NC
American	3	7–2	.778	3	2	1	1	1	1	1
ACC	8	17–8	.680	8	8	5	2	1	1	–
Big Ten	7	8–7	.533	7	4	2	1	1	–	–
SEC	7	10–7	.588	7	5	2	2	1	–	–
Big 12	5	6–5	.545	5	3	2	1	–	–	–
Atlantic 10	2	3–2	.600	2	1	1	1	–	–	–
Pac-12	5	6–5	.545	5	4	2	–	–	–	–
WCC	2	2–2	.500	2	1	1	–	–	–	–
Sun Belt	1	1–1	.500	1	1	–	–	–	–	–
Atlantic Sun	1	1–1	.500	1	1	–	–	–	–	–
Ivy	1	1–1	.500	1	1	–	–	–	–	–
Big East	2	1–2	.333	2	1	–	–	–	–	–

- The R64, R32, S16, E8, F4, CG, NC columns indicate how many teams from each conference were in the round of 64 (second round), round of 32 (third round), Sweet 16, Elite Eight, Final Four, championship game, and national champion, respectively.
- The America East, Big Sky, Big South, Big West, CAA, C-USA, Horizon, MAAC, MAC, MEAC, MVC, NW, NEC, OVC, Patriot, SoCon, Southland, SWAC, Summit, and WAC each had one representative, eliminated in the first round with a record of 0–1.

== Game Officials ==
- Lisa Mattingly (semifinal)
- Felicia Grinter (semifinal)
- Bryan Brunette (semifinal)
- Joe Vaszily (semifinal)
- Eric Brewton (semifinal)
- Maj Forsberg (semifinal)
- Dee Kanter (final)
- Denise Brooks (final)
- Mark Zentz (final)
- Penny Davis (Standby)

== Media coverage ==
=== Television ===
ESPN had US television rights to all games during the tournament. For the first and second round, ESPN aired select games nationally on ESPN, ESPNU, or ESPNews. All other games aired regionally on ESPN, ESPN2, or ESPN3 and were streamed online via WatchESPN. Most of the nation got whip-a-round coverage during this time, which allowed ESPN to rotate between the games and focus the nation on the one that had the closest score. The regional semifinals were split between ESPN and ESPN2, and ESPN aired the regional finals, national semifinals, and championship match. Coverage began with the selection show on Monday, March 12, 2015.

==== Studio host & analysts ====
- Kevin Negandhi (Host)
- Kara Lawson (Analyst)
- Rebecca Lobo (Analyst)

==== Broadcast Assignments ====
First & Second Rounds Friday/Sunday

- Tiffany Greene and LaChina Robinson – Durham, North Carolina
- Brenda VanLengen and Carol Ross – Lexington, Kentucky
- Clay Matvick and Katie Smith – Iowa City, Iowa
- Fran Harris and Nell Fortner – Waco, Texas
- Beth Mowins and Stephanie White – Notre Dame, Indiana
- Pam Ward and Carolyn Peck – Columbia, South Carolina
- Cara Capuano and Steffi Sorensen – Corvallis, Oregon
- Melissa Lee and Mary Murphy – Berkeley, California

Sweet Sixteen & Elite Eight Friday/Sunday

- Beth Mowins, Stephanie White, and Maria Taylor – Greensboro, North Carolina
- Pam Ward, Carolyn Peck, and LaChina Robinson – Oklahoma City, Oklahoma

Final Four

- Dave O'Brien, Doris Burke, and Holly Rowe – Tampa, Florida

First & Second Rounds Saturday/Monday

- Paul Sunderland and Gail Goestenkors – Knoxville, Tennessee
- Dave O'Brien and Doris Burke – College Park, Maryland
- Marc Kestecher and Christy Winters-Scott – Chapel Hill, North Carolina
- Mark Jones and Sue Bird – Tallahassee, Florida
- Bob Picozzi and Brooke Weisbrod – Tampa, Florida
- Dave Pasch and Debbie Antonelli – Tempe, Arizona
- Dave Flemming and Sean Farnham – Stanford, California
- Bob Wischusen and LaPhonso Ellis – Storrs, Connecticut

Sweet Sixteen & Elite Eight Saturday/Monday

- Dave O'Brien, Doris Burke, and Holly Rowe – Albany, New York
- Dave Pasch, Debbie Antonelli, and Allison Williams – Spokane, Washington

Championship

- Dave O'Brien, Doris Burke, and Holly Rowe – Tampa, Florida

=== Radio ===
Westwood One had exclusive radio rights to the entire tournament. Teams participating in the Regional Finals, Final Four, and championship were allowed to have their own local broadcasts, but they were not allowed to stream those broadcasts online.

Regional Finals Sunday

- Amy Lawrence and Ann Meyers Drysdale – Oklahoma City, Oklahoma
- Craig Way and Brenda VanLengen – Greensboro, North Carolina

Final Four

- John Sadak, Debbie Antonelli, and Krista Blunk – Tampa, Florida

Regional Finals Monday

- John Sadak and Swin Cash – Albany, New York
- Dick Fain and Krista Blunk – Spokane, Washington

Championship

- John Sadak, Debbie Antonelli, and Krista Blunk – Tampa, Florida

== See also ==
- 2015 NCAA Division I men's basketball tournament
- 2015 NAIA Division I women's basketball tournament
- 2015 Women's National Invitation Tournament
- 2015 NCAA Women's Division III basketball tournament
- UConn–Notre Dame rivalry
