= 2015 Summit League women's basketball tournament =

- Classification: Division I
- Season: 2014–15
- Teams: 8
- Site: Denny Sanford Premier Center; Sioux Falls, South Dakota
- Champions: South Dakota State (6th title)
- Winning coach: Aaron Johnston (6th title)
- MVP: Nicole Seekamp (South Dakota)
- Television: Midco Sport Network; ESPN3; ESPNU

2014–15 Summit League women's basketball standings
	Conf.				Overall
Team	W		L	PCT	W		L	PCT
South Dakota	13	–	3	.813	26	–	8	.765
South Dakota State†	12	–	4	.750	24	–	9	.727
Western Illinois	9	–	7	.563	17	–	13	.567
Oral Roberts	9	–	7	.563	18	–	16	.529
IUPUI	9	–	7	.563	15	–	16	.484
North Dakota State	7	–	9	.438	11	–	18	.379
Omaha*	5	–	11	.313	10	–	18	.357
Denver	5	–	11	.313	8	–	23	.258
IPFW	3	–	13	.188	9	–	21	.300
† 2015 Summit League Tournament winner As of March 22, 2015; Rankings from AP Poll *ineligible for postseason due to Div. I transition

The 2015 Summit League women's basketball tournament was a post-season women's basketball tournament for The Summit League. The tournament took place March 7–10 at the Denny Sanford Premier Center in Sioux Falls, South Dakota. The Top 8 teams in the final standings will qualify for the tournament. Omaha's transition into Division I basketball has deemed them ineligible from postseason play and instead of the top 8 teams qualify for the Summit League tournament it will be the 8 teams eligible for the tournament will play. South Dakota State defeated South Dakota to win the Summit League tournament title to receive an automatic bid into the 2015 NCAA tournament.

== Seeds ==
Seed	School	Conference	Overall	Tiebreaker #1	Tiebreaker #2
1	South Dakota	13-3	26-8		
2	South Dakota State	12-4	24-9		
3	Oral Roberts	9-7	18-16		
4	Western Illinois	9-7	17-13		
5	IUPUI	9-7	15-16		
6	North Dakota State	7-9	11-18		
7	Denver	5-11	8-23		
8	IPFW	3-13	9-21		

== Schedule ==
Session	Game	Time*	Matchup^{#}	Television	Attendance
Quarterfinals – Saturday March 7, 2015
1	1	12:00 PM	#1 South Dakota vs. #8 IPFW	MidcoSN/ESPN3	
1	2	2:30 PM	#2 South Dakota State vs. #7 Denver	MidcoSN/ESPN3	
Quarterfinals – Sunday March 8, 2015
2	3	12:00 PM	#4 Western Illinois vs. #5 IUPUI	MidcoSN/ESPN3	
2	4	2:30 PM	#3 Oral Roberts vs. #6 North Dakota State	MidcoSN/ESPN3	
Semifinals – March 9, 2015
3	5	12:00 PM	#1 South Dakota vs. #5 IUPUI	MidcoSN/ESPN3	
3	6	2:30 PM	#2 South Dakota State vs. #6 Oral Roberts	MidcoSN/ESPN3	
Championship – Tuesday March 10, 2015
4	7	1:00 PM	#1 South Dakota vs. #2 South Dakota State	ESPNU	
*Game times in CT. #-Rankings denote tournament seed

== Bracket ==
Quarterfinals; Saturday/Sunday March 7–8; MidcoSN/ ESPN3
1	South Dakota	78
8	IPFW	70
4	Western Illinois	59
5	IUPUI	66
2	South Dakota State	79
7	Denver	61
3	Oral Roberts	71
6	North Dakota State	58

Semifinals; Monday March 9 Midco Sport Network/ESPN3
1	South Dakota	69
5	IUPUI	58
2	South Dakota State	59'
6	Oral Roberts	48

Championship game Tuesday March 10; ESPNU
1	South Dakota	57
2	South Dakota State	72
