= 2015 SWAC women's basketball tournament =

- Tournament logo
- Classification: Division I
- Season: 2014–15
- Teams: 8
- Site: Toyota Center; Houston, Texas
- Television: ESPN3

2014–15 SWAC women's basketball standings
	Conf.				Overall
Team	W		L	PCT	W		L	PCT
Texas Southern	16	–	2	.889	19	–	10	.655
Southern*	15	–	3	.833	19	–	12	.613
Alabama State†	10	–	8	.556	17	–	14	.548
Jackson State	10	–	8	.556	14	–	17	.452
Prairie View A&M	10	–	8	.556	14	–	18	.438
Alcorn State	9	–	9	.500	10	–	18	.357
Grambling State	7	–	11	.389	10	–	20	.333
Arkansas-Pine Bluff @	5	–	13	.278	7	–	22	.241
Alabama A&M	5	–	13	.278	6	–	24	.200
Mississippi Valley State	2	–	16	.111	4	–	26	.133
† 2015 SWAC tournament winner As of 14 March 2015; Rankings from AP poll *ineligible for postseason play for failure to supply usable academic data to the NCAA @-ineligible for postseason play due to low APR

The 2015 SWAC women's basketball tournament took place March 11–14, 2015, at the Toyota Center in Houston, Texas. The tournament champion received the Southwestern Athletic Conference's automatic bid to the 2015 NCAA Women's Division I Basketball Championship.

== Format ==
8 teams competed in the 2015 WBB Tournament. Texas Southern, who was the regular season champions, withdrew from the tournament after 8 players were suspended due to a season-ending brawl with Southern. Arkansas–Pine Bluff was ineligible to participate due to a low APR.

== Seeds ==
2015 SWAC Women's Basketball Tournament seeds
Seed	School	Conference Record	Overall Record (End of Regular season)	Tiebreaker
1.	Texas Southern	16-2	19-10	Withdrew from tourney due to 8 suspensions.
2.	Southern	15-3	17-11	
3.	Jackson State	10-8	13-16	2–0 vs. Alabama State, 1–1 vs. Prairie View A&M
4.	Prairie View A&M	10-8	13-17	1–1 vs. Jackson State, 1–1 vs. Alabama State
5.	Alabama State	10-8	14-14	1–1 vs. Prairie View A&M, 0–2 vs. Jackson State
6.	Alcorn State	9-9	10-17	
7.	Grambling State	7-11	10-19	
8.	Arkansas–Pine Bluff	5-13	7-22	Ineligible for SWAC Tournament.
9.	Alabama A&M	5-13	6-23	
10.	Mississippi Valley State	2-16	4-25	

== Bracket ==
Quarterfinals; Wednesday, March 11; Thursday, March 12; SWAC Digital- Wed only
1	Southern	62
8	Mississippi Valley State	57
4	Prairie View A&M	66
5	Alcorn State	59
2	Jackson State	89
7	Alabama A&M	82^{OT}
3	Alabama State	65
6	Grambling State	62

Semifinals; Friday, March 13
1	Southern	60
4	Prairie View A&M	42
2	Jackson State	60
3	Alabama State	62

Championship; Saturday, March 14; ESPN3
1	Southern	55
3	Alabama State	73

All times listed are Central
