= 2014–15 NCAA Division I women's basketball season =

American college basketball season

- Preseason AP No. 1: Connecticut
- Regular season: November 2014 – April 7, 2015
- NCAA Tournament: 2015
- Tournament dates: March 20 – April 7, 2015
- National Championship: Amalie Arena; Tampa, Florida
- NCAA Champions: Connecticut
- Other champions: UCLA (WNIT); Louisiana–Lafayette (WBI)
- Player of the Year (Naismith, Wooden): Breanna Stewart

The 2014–15 NCAA Division I women's basketball season began in November and ended with the Final Four in Tampa, Florida, April 5–7. Practices officially began on October 3.

This was the final season in which NCAA women's basketball games were played in 20-minute halves. Beginning with the 2015–16 season, the women's game switched to 10-minute quarters, the standard for FIBA and WNBA play.

== Season headlines ==
- May 14 – The NCAA announced its Academic Progress Rate (APR) sanctions for the 2014–15 school year. A total of 36 programs in 11 sports were declared ineligible for postseason play due to failure to meet the required APR benchmark. While no women's basketball teams were forbidden from postseason play due to APR sanctions, three Division I women's basketball teams faced level 1 or 2 sanctions:
  - New Orleans (Level 2)
  - Savannah State (Level 1)
  - Towson (Level 1)
- Southern was declared ineligible for postseason play in all sports for failing to supply usable academic data to the NCAA.

== Milestones and records ==
- February 3 – Connecticut's Geno Auriemma earned his 900th career win in the Huskies' 96–36 blowout of Cincinnati. Auriemma, coaching in his 1,034th game, broke the previous record that was held by Pat Summitt for the fewest games to reach 900 wins. He also became the first man to reach the 900-win mark in NCAA women's basketball; the previous six coaches to do so are all women.

== Conference membership changes ==
The 2014–15 season saw the final wave of membership changes resulting from a major realignment of NCAA Division I conferences. The cycle began in 2010 with the Big Ten and the then-Pac-10 publicly announcing their intentions to expand. The fallout from these conferences' moves later affected a majority of D-I conferences.

School	Former conference	New conference
Appalachian State Mountaineers	Southern	Sun Belt
Davidson Wildcats	Southern	Atlantic 10
East Carolina Pirates	C-USA	The American
East Tennessee State Buccaneers	Atlantic Sun	Southern
Elon Phoenix	Southern	CAA
Georgia Southern Eagles	Southern	Sun Belt
Idaho Vandals	WAC	Big Sky
Louisville Cardinals	The American	ACC
Maryland Terrapins	ACC	Big Ten
Mercer Bears	Atlantic Sun	Southern
Oral Roberts Golden Eagles	Southland	The Summit
Rutgers Scarlet Knights	The American	Big Ten
Tulane Green Wave	C-USA	The American
Tulsa Golden Hurricane	C-USA	The American
Western Kentucky Lady Toppers	Sun Belt	C-USA

== Season outlook ==
=== Pre-season polls ===
The top 25 from the AP and USA Today Coaches Polls.

Associated Press
Ranking	Team
1	Connecticut (35)
2	South Carolina
3	Notre Dame
4	Tennessee
5	Texas A&M
6	Stanford
7	Duke
8	Baylor
9	Texas
10	Maryland
11	Kentucky
12	Louisville
13	North Carolina
14	Michigan State
15	Cal
16	Nebraska
17	West Virginia
18	DePaul
19	Iowa
20	Oregon State
21	Oklahoma State
22	Dayton
23	UCLA
24	Rutgers
25	Syracuse

USA Today Coaches
Ranking	Team
1	Connecticut (32)
2	South Carolina
3	Notre Dame
4	Tennessee
5	Texas A&M
6	Stanford
7	Duke
8	Maryland
9	Baylor
10	Kentucky
11	Louisville
12	Texas
13	North Carolina
14	Cal
15	Michigan State
16	Nebraska
17	West Virginia
18	DePaul
19	Iowa
20	Oklahoma State
21	Oregon State
22	Dayton
23	UCLA
24	LSU
25	Syracuse

== Regular season ==
=== Early season tournaments ===
Although these tournaments include more teams, only the number listed play for the championship.

=== Conference winners and tournaments ===
Thirty-one athletic conferences each end their regular seasons with a single-elimination tournament. The teams in each conference that win their regular season title are given the number one seed in each tournament. The winners of these tournaments receive automatic invitations to the 2015 NCAA Women's Division I Basketball Tournament. The Ivy League does not have a conference tournament, instead giving their automatic invitation to their regular season champion.

Conference	Regular season winner	Conference player of the year	Conference Coach of the Year	Conference tournament	Tournament venue (city)	Tournament winner
America East Conference	Albany & Maine	Shereesha Richards, Albany	Richard Barron, Maine	2015 America East women's basketball tournament	Binghamton University Events Center (Binghamton, New York)	Albany
American Athletic Conference	Connecticut	Breanna Stewart, Connecticut	Geno Auriemma, Connecticut	2015 American Athletic Conference women's basketball tournament	Mohegan Sun Arena (Uncasville, Connecticut)	Connecticut
Atlantic 10 Conference	George Washington	Jonquel Jones, George Washington	Jonathan Tsipis, George Washington	2015 Atlantic 10 women's basketball tournament	Richmond Coliseum (Richmond, Virginia)	George Washington
Atlantic Coast Conference	Notre Dame	Jewell Loyd, Notre Dame	Sue Semrau, Florida State	2015 ACC women's basketball tournament	Greensboro Coliseum (Greensboro, North Carolina)	Notre Dame
Atlantic Sun Conference	Florida Gulf Coast	Whitney Knight, Florida Gulf Coast	Karl Smesko, Florida Gulf Coast	2015 Atlantic Sun women's basketball tournament	Campus sites	Florida Gulf Coast
Big 12 Conference	Baylor	Nina Davis, Baylor	Kim Mulkey, Baylor	2015 Big 12 women's basketball tournament	American Airlines Center (Dallas)	Baylor
Big East Conference	DePaul & Seton Hall	Brittany Hrynko, DePaul	Tony Bozzella, Seton Hall	2015 Big East women's basketball tournament	Allstate Arena (Rosemont, Illinois)	DePaul
Big Sky Conference	Montana	Kellie Rubel, Montana; D'shara Strange, Northern Colorado	Robin Selvig, Montana	2015 Big Sky Conference women's basketball tournament	Dahlberg Arena (Missoula, Montana)	Montana
Big South Conference	Liberty	Stacia Robertson, High Point	Mike McGuire, Radford	2015 Big South Conference women's basketball tournament	HTC Center (Conway, South Carolina)	Liberty
Big Ten Conference	Maryland	Amanda Zahui B., Minnesota (media); Kelsey Mitchell, Ohio State (coaches)	Brenda Frese, Maryland	2015 Big Ten Conference women's basketball tournament	Sears Centre (Hoffman Estates, Illinois)	Maryland
Big West Conference	Hawaii	Brittany Crain, UC Riverside	Laura Beeman, Hawaii	2015 Big West Conference women's basketball tournament	Honda Center (Anaheim, California)	Cal State Northridge
Colonial Athletic Association	James Madison	Precious Hall, James Madison	Kenny Brooks, James Madison	2015 CAA women's basketball tournament	Show Place Arena (Upper Marlboro, Maryland)	James Madison
Conference USA	WKU	Chastity Gooch, WKU	Michelle Clark-Heard, WKU	2015 Conference USA women's basketball tournament	Birmingham–Jefferson Convention Complex (Birmingham, Alabama)	WKU
Horizon League	Green Bay	Tay'ler Mingo, Wright State	Mike Bradbury, Wright State	2015 Horizon League women's basketball tournament	1st & Quarters: Campus sites Semifinals & Finals @ highest remaining seed	Green Bay
Ivy League	Princeton	Blake Dietrick, Princeton	Courtney Banghart, Princeton	No tournament		
Metro Atlantic Athletic Conference	Quinnipiac	Damika Martinez, Iona	Tricia Fabbri, Quinnipiac	2015 MAAC women's basketball tournament	Times Union Center (Albany, New York)	Quinnipiac
Mid-American Conference	Ohio (East); Ball State (West)	Sina King, Akron	Bob Boldon, Ohio	2015 Mid-American Conference women's basketball tournament	First round at campus sites Remainder at Quicken Loans Arena (Cleveland, Ohio)	Ohio
Mid-Eastern Athletic Conference	Hampton	Malia Tate-DeFreitas, Hampton	Cedric Baker, Savannah State	2015 MEAC women's basketball tournament	Norfolk Scope (Norfolk, Virginia)	Savannah State
Missouri Valley Conference	Wichita State	Alex Harden, Wichita State	Jody Adams, Wichita State	2015 Missouri Valley Conference women's basketball tournament	Family Arena (St. Charles, Missouri)	Wichita State
Mountain West Conference	Colorado State	Gritt Ryder, Colorado State; Alex Sheedy, Fresno State	Yvonne Sanchez, New Mexico	2015 Mountain West Conference women's basketball tournament	Thomas & Mack Center (Paradise, Nevada)	Boise State
Northeast Conference	Bryant & Central Connecticut	Breanna Rucker, Bryant	Beryl Piper, Central Connecticut	2015 Northeast Conference women's basketball tournament	Campus sites	St. Francis Brooklyn
Ohio Valley Conference	Tennessee–Martin (East); Tennessee State (West)	Ashia Jones, Tennessee–Martin	Kevin McMillan, Tennessee–Martin	2015 Ohio Valley Conference women's basketball tournament	Nashville Municipal Auditorium (Nashville, Tennessee)	Tennessee State
Pac-12 Conference	Oregon State	Reshanda Gray, California (coaches); Ruth Hamblin, Oregon State (media)	Scott Rueck, Oregon State	2015 Pac-12 Conference women's basketball tournament	KeyArena (Seattle)	Stanford
Patriot League	American	Jen Dumiak, American	Megan Gebbia, American	2015 Patriot League women's basketball tournament	Campus sites	American
Southeastern Conference	South Carolina & Tennessee	Tiffany Mitchell, South Carolina	Vic Schaefer, Mississippi State (AP and coaches); Dawn Staley, South Carolina (coaches)	2015 SEC women's basketball tournament	Verizon Arena (North Little Rock, Arkansas)	South Carolina
Southern Conference	Chattanooga	Precious Bridges, Mercer	Jim Foster, Chattanooga	2015 Southern Conference women's basketball tournament	U.S. Cellular Center (Asheville, North Carolina)	Chattanooga
Southland Conference	Stephen F. Austin	Porsha Roberts, Stephen F. Austin	Brandon Schneider, Stephen F. Austin; DoBee Plaisance, Nicholls State	2015 Southland Conference women's basketball tournament	Leonard E. Merrell Center (Katy, Texas)	Northwestern State
Southwestern Athletic Conference	Texas Southern	Jeanette Jackson, Prairie View A&M	Johnetta Hayes-Perry, Texas Southern	2015 SWAC women's basketball tournament	Toyota Center (Houston, Texas)	Alabama State
The Summit League	South Dakota	Ashley Luke, Western Illinois	Amy Williams, South Dakota	2015 Summit League women's basketball tournament	Sioux Falls Arena (Sioux Falls, South Dakota)	South Dakota State
Sun Belt Conference	Arkansas-Little Rock	Aundrea Gamble, Arkansas State	Joe Foley, Arkansas–Little Rock	2015 Sun Belt Conference women's basketball tournament	Lakefront Arena (New Orleans)	Arkansas-Little Rock
West Coast Conference	Gonzaga	Morgan Bailey, BYU	Lisa Fortier, Gonzaga; Lynne Roberts, Pacific; Paul Thomas, Saint Mary's	2015 West Coast Conference women's basketball tournament	Orleans Arena (Paradise, Nevada)	BYU
Western Athletic Conference	New Mexico State	Brianna Freeman, New Mexico State	Mark Trakh, New Mexico State	2015 WAC women's basketball tournament	Orleans Arena (Paradise, Nevada)	New Mexico State

=== Statistical leaders ===
Points per game			Rebounds per game			Assists per game			Steals per game		
Player	School	PPG	Player	School	RPG	Player	School	APG	Player	School	SPG
Kelsey Mitchell	Ohio State	24.9	Vicky McIntyre	Oral Roberts	15.8	Niya Johnson	Baylor	8.9	Regina Okoye	Weber State	3.69
Jasmine Nwaje	Wagner	24.8	Jillian Alleyne	Oregon	15.2	Almesha Jones	Morehead State	8.2	Tiasha Gray	Austin Peay	3.67
Damika Martinez	Iona	23.8	Ruvanna Campbell	UIC	14.1	Samantha Logic	Iowa	8.1	Dominique Brothers	Jackson State	3.57
Ashia Jones	UT Martin	23.4	Amanda Zahui B.	Minnesota	12.9	Angela Mickens	James Madison	7.6	Syessence Davis	Rutgers	3.28
Alexa Hayward	Saint Francis (PA)	23.2	Joy Adams	Iona	12.6	Shayne Mullaney	Minnesota	7.5	Lia Galdeira	Washington State	3.28

Blocked shots per game			Field goal percentage			Three-point field goal percentage			Free throw percentage		
Player	School	BPG	Player	School	FG%	Player	School	3FG%	Player	School	FT%
Sophia Ederaine	San Diego	4.75	Brianna Turner	Notre Dame	65.2	Kaleena Mosqueda-Lewis	Connecticut	48.8	Nici Gilday	Santa Clara	94.5
Vicky McIntyre	Oral Roberts	4.71	Porsha Roberts	Stephen F. Austin	63.2	Nicole Bauman	Wisconsin	48.8	Arlesia Morse	Marquette	92.5
Kailyn Williams	Bethune–Cookman	4.30	Alexa Hart	Ohio State	62.7	Kelsey Harris	UC Davis	48.3	Jen Dumiak	American	92.2
Amanda Zahui B.	Minnesota	4.09	Kaylon Williams	Oklahoma	59.6	Andrea Hoover	Dayton	45.6	Sophie Bikofsky	Brown	92.1
Jasmine Joyner	Chattanooga	4.00	Morgan Tuck	Connecticut	59.6	Madeline Blais	Marist	45.1	Haley Seibert	IPFW	91/4

== Postseason tournaments ==
=== NCAA tournament ===
==== Final Four – Amalie Arena, Tampa, Florida ====
National Semifinals; April 7
1ALB	Connecticut	81
1SPO	Maryland	58
1OKC	Notre Dame	66
1GRN	South Carolina	65

National Championship Game; April 9
1ALB	Connecticut	63
1OKC	Notre Dame	53

==== Tournament upsets ====
For this list, a "major upset" is defined as a win by a team seeded seven or more spots below its defeated opponent.

Date	Winner	Score	Loser	Region	Round
March 22	#11 Gonzaga	76–64	#3 Oregon State	Spokane	Second

=== Women's National Invitation tournament ===
After the NCAA Tournament field was announced, 64 teams were invited to participate in the Women's National Invitation Tournament. The tournament began on March 20, 2013, and ended with the final on April 6. Unlike the men's National Invitation Tournament, whose semifinals and finals are held at Madison Square Garden, the WNIT holds all of its games at campus sites.

==== WNIT semifinals and final ====
Played at campus sites

Semifinals; April 3
1	UCLA	69
4	Michigan	65
3	Temple	58
2	West Virginia	66*

Championship game April 6
UCLA	62
West Virginia	60

=== Women's Invitational tournament ===
The sixth Women's Basketball Invitational (WBI) Tournament began in March 2015, and ended with a best-of-three final scheduled for March 31, April 2, and April 5; the final went the full three games. This tournament featured 16 teams who were left out of the NCAA Tournament and NIT.

==== WBI semifinals and final ====
Played at campus sites

Semifinals; April 3
2	Louisiana–Lafayette	65
5	Oral Roberts	64
3	Siena	65
4	Mercer	54

Championship game April 6
2	Louisiana–Lafayette	52
3	Siena	50

== Conference standings ==
2014–15 American Athletic Conference women's basketball standings
	Conf.				Overall
Team	W		L	PCT	W		L	PCT
No. 1 UConn †	18	–	0	1.000	38	–	1	.974
No. 25 South Florida	15	–	3	.833	27	–	8	.771
Tulsa	12	–	6	.667	18	–	14	.563
Temple	12	–	6	.667	20	–	17	.541
East Carolina	11	–	7	.611	22	–	11	.667
Tulane	11	–	7	.611	22	–	11	.667
Memphis	7	–	11	.389	14	–	17	.452
UCF	5	–	13	.278	9	–	21	.300
Cincinnati	4	–	14	.222	8	–	23	.258
SMU	3	–	15	.167	7	–	23	.233
Houston	1	–	17	.056	6	–	24	.200
† American Tournament winner winner As of 7 April 2015; Rankings from AP poll

2014–15 America East Conference women's basketball standings
	Conf.				Overall
Team	W		L	PCT	W		L	PCT
Albany †	14	–	2	.875	24	–	9	.727
Maine	14	–	2	.875	23	–	9	.719
Stony Brook	10	–	6	.625	17	–	14	.548
New Hampshire	9	–	7	.563	17	–	12	.586
Hartford	8	–	8	.500	16	–	17	.485
UMass Lowell*	7	–	9	.438	14	–	15	.483
UMBC	6	–	10	.375	12	–	19	.387
Vermont	2	–	14	.125	5	–	24	.172
Binghamton	2	–	14	.125	4	–	26	.133
† 2015 America East tournament winner As of March 20, 2015 *ineligible for postseason play due to Div. I transitions Rankings from AP poll

2014–15 Atlantic 10 women's basketball standings
	Conf.				Overall
Team	W		L	PCT	W		L	PCT
No. 19 George Washington^{†}	15	–	1	.938	29	–	4	.879
Dayton	14	–	2	.875	28	–	7	.800
Duquesne	12	–	4	.750	23	–	11	.676
Fordham	11	–	5	.688	21	–	12	.636
Richmond	9	–	7	.563	19	–	14	.576
Rhode Island	8	–	8	.500	17	–	13	.567
Saint Joseph's	8	–	8	.500	13	–	17	.433
VCU	7	–	9	.438	16	–	14	.533
Saint Louis	7	–	9	.438	15	–	16	.484
St. Bonaventure	5	–	11	.313	15	–	15	.500
La Salle	5	–	11	.313	15	–	16	.484
George Mason	5	–	11	.313	13	–	17	.433
UMass	5	–	11	.313	12	–	18	.400
Davidson	1	–	15	.063	5	–	25	.167
† 2015 A10 Tournament winner As of 30 March 2015; Rankings from AP poll

2014–15 Atlantic Sun women's basketball standings
	Conf.				Overall
Team	W		L	PCT	W		L	PCT
No. 20 Florida Gulf Coast†	14	–	0	1.000	31	–	3	.912
Stetson	11	–	3	.786	23	–	8	.742
Northern Kentucky*	8	–	6	.571	19	–	14	.576
Kennesaw State	6	–	8	.429	17	–	13	.567
USC Upstate	6	–	8	.429	14	–	16	.467
Jacksonville	6	–	8	.429	12	–	17	.414
Lipscomb	3	–	11	.214	8	–	21	.276
North Florida	2	–	12	.143	11	–	19	.367
† 2015 Atlantic Sun Tournament winner As of March 23, 2015; Rankings from AP poll *Ineligible for postseason play due to Div. I transition

2014–15 ACC women's basketball standings
	Conf.				Overall
Team	W		L	PCT	W		L	PCT
No. 2 Notre Dame^{†}	15	–	1	.938	36	–	3	.923
No. 7 Florida State	14	–	2	.875	32	–	5	.865
No. 8 Louisville	12	–	4	.750	27	–	7	.794
No. 16 Duke	11	–	5	.688	23	–	11	.676
Syracuse	11	–	5	.688	22	–	10	.688
No. 15 North Carolina	10	–	6	.625	26	–	9	.743
Pittsburgh	9	–	7	.563	20	–	12	.625
Miami (FL)	8	–	8	.500	20	–	13	.606
Virginia	7	–	9	.438	17	–	14	.548
NC State	7	–	9	.438	18	–	15	.545
Georgia Tech	7	–	9	.438	19	–	15	.559
Boston College	5	–	11	.313	13	–	17	.433
Wake Forest	2	–	14	.125	13	–	20	.394
Virginia Tech	1	–	15	.063	12	–	20	.375
Clemson	1	–	15	.063	9	–	21	.300
† 2015 ACC tournament winner As of 7 April 2015; Rankings from AP poll

2014–15 Big East Conference women's basketball standings
	Conf.				Overall
Team	W		L	PCT	W		L	PCT
Seton Hall *	15	–	3	.833	28	–	6	.824
DePaul †	15	–	3	.833	27	–	8	.771
Villanova	12	–	6	.667	22	–	14	.611
St. John's	11	–	7	.611	23	–	11	.676
Creighton	10	–	8	.556	17	–	14	.548
Butler	10	–	8	.556	14	–	16	.467
Xavier	8	–	10	.444	18	–	14	.563
Marquette	4	–	14	.222	9	–	22	.290
Providence	3	–	15	.167	6	–	24	.200
Georgetown	2	–	16	.111	4	–	27	.129
† 2015 Big East Basketball Tournament winner * Tournament #1 seed As of March 29, 2015; Rankings from AP poll

2014–15 Big Sky women's basketball standings
	Conf.				Overall
Team	W		L	PCT	W		L	PCT
Montana†	14	–	4	.778	24	–	9	.727
Sacramento State	13	–	5	.722	18	–	16	.529
Eastern Washington	12	–	6	.667	21	–	12	.636
Northern Colorado	12	–	6	.667	22	–	13	.629
North Dakota	9	–	9	.500	17	–	15	.531
Montana State	9	–	9	.500	15	–	15	.500
Northern Arizona	9	–	9	.500	13	–	17	.433
Idaho	8	–	10	.444	14	–	15	.483
Idaho State	8	–	10	.444	13	–	17	.433
Southern Utah	6	–	12	.333	13	–	15	.464
Weber State	6	–	12	.333	11	–	18	.379
Portland State	2	–	16	.111	4	–	25	.138
† 2015 Big Sky tournament winner As of March 26, 2015; Rankings from AP poll

2014–15 Big South women's basketball standings
	Conf.				Overall
Team	W		L	PCT	W		L	PCT
Liberty†	19	–	1	.950	26	–	6	.813
Radford	14	–	6	.700	17	–	13	.567
High Point	14	–	6	.700	20	–	12	.625
Winthrop	13	–	7	.650	17	–	13	.567
Campbell	13	–	7	.650	19	–	12	.613
Presbyterian	10	–	10	.500	16	–	15	.516
Gardner-Webb	9	–	11	.450	15	–	17	.469
UNC Asheville	7	–	13	.350	9	–	22	.290
Coastal Carolina	6	–	14	.300	12	–	18	.400
Longwood	4	–	16	.200	4	–	26	.133
Charleston Southern	1	–	19	.050	5	–	25	.167
† 2015 Big South tournament winner As of March 19, 2015; Rankings from AP poll

2014–15 Big Ten women's basketball standings
	Conf.				Overall
Team	W		L	PCT	W		L	PCT
No. 4 Maryland†	18	–	0	1.000	34	–	3	.919
No. 18 Iowa	14	–	4	.778	26	–	8	.765
No. 23 Ohio State	13	–	5	.722	24	–	11	.686
No. 22 Northwestern	12	–	6	.667	23	–	9	.719
Rutgers	12	–	6	.667	23	–	10	.697
Minnesota	11	–	7	.611	23	–	10	.697
Nebraska	10	–	8	.556	21	–	11	.656
Michigan	8	–	10	.444	20	–	15	.571
Michigan State	7	–	11	.389	16	–	15	.516
Illinois	6	–	12	.333	15	–	16	.484
Wisconsin	5	–	13	.278	9	–	20	.310
Indiana	4	–	14	.222	15	–	16	.484
Purdue	3	–	15	.167	11	–	20	.355
Penn State	3	–	15	.167	6	–	24	.200
† 2015 Big Ten tournament winner As of April 5, 2015; Rankings from AP poll

2014–15 Big West women's basketball standings
	Conf.				Overall
Team	W		L	PCT	W		L	PCT
Hawai'i	14	–	2	.875	23	–	9	.719
Cal State Northridge†	11	–	5	.688	23	–	10	.697
Cal Poly	10	–	6	.625	15	–	13	.536
Long Beach State	9	–	7	.563	22	–	10	.688
UC Riverside	8	–	8	.500	17	–	13	.567
UC Davis	8	–	8	.500	13	–	15	.464
Cal State Fullerton	5	–	11	.313	11	–	18	.379
UC Irvine	5	–	11	.313	8	–	23	.258
UC Santa Barbara	2	–	14	.125	2	–	27	.069
† 2015 Big West tournament winner As of 29 June 2014; Rankings from AP poll

2014–15 Big 12 Conference women's basketball standings
	Conf.				Overall
Team	W		L	PCT	W		L	PCT
No. 5 Baylor †	16	–	2	.889	33	–	4	.892
Oklahoma	13	–	5	.722	21	–	12	.636
TCU	9	–	9	.500	18	–	14	.563
Oklahoma State	9	–	9	.500	20	–	12	.625
Iowa State	9	–	9	.500	18	–	13	.581
Texas	9	–	9	.500	24	–	11	.686
West Virginia	7	–	11	.389	23	–	15	.605
Kansas State	7	–	11	.389	19	–	14	.576
Kansas	6	–	12	.333	15	–	17	.469
Texas Tech	5	–	13	.278	15	–	16	.484
† 2015 Big 12 Tournament winner Rankings from AP poll

2014–15 CAA women's basketball standings
	Conf.				Overall
Team	W		L	PCT	W		L	PCT
James Madison†	17	–	1	.944	29	–	4	.879
Drexel	14	–	4	.778	20	–	11	.645
Hofstra	11	–	7	.611	20	–	13	.606
Elon	11	–	7	.611	19	–	13	.594
UNC Wilmington	10	–	8	.556	14	–	16	.467
William & Mary	9	–	9	.500	15	–	16	.484
Delaware	8	–	10	.444	15	–	17	.469
Towson	6	–	12	.333	11	–	21	.344
College of Charleston	3	–	15	.167	5	–	25	.167
Northeastern	1	–	17	.056	4	–	25	.138
† 2015 CAA tournament winner Rankings from AP poll

2014–15 Conference USA women's basketball standings
	Conf.				Overall
Team	W		L	PCT	W		L	PCT
WKU †	16	–	2	.889	30	–	5	.857
Middle Tennessee	14	–	4	.778	24	–	10	.706
Southern Miss	13	–	5	.722	25	–	11	.694
Old Dominion	11	–	7	.611	21	–	13	.618
UAB	11	–	7	.611	18	–	13	.581
UTSA	11	–	7	.611	16	–	15	.516
Louisiana Tech	10	–	8	.556	16	–	15	.516
Charlotte	10	–	8	.556	15	–	17	.469
Marshall	8	–	10	.444	17	–	15	.531
Florida Atlantic	7	–	11	.389	13	–	17	.433
UTEP	7	–	11	.389	12	–	16	.429
Rice	4	–	14	.222	9	–	21	.300
North Texas	4	–	14	.222	5	–	24	.172
FIU	0	–	18	.000	3	–	26	.103
† 2015 C-USA tournament winner As of 29 March 2015; Rankings from AP poll

2014–15 Horizon League women's basketball standings
	Conf.				Overall
Team	W		L	PCT	W		L	PCT
Green Bay †	15	–	1	.938	28	–	5	.848
Wright State	12	–	4	.750	25	–	8	.758
Cleveland State	10	–	6	.625	19	–	12	.613
Youngstown State	9	–	7	.563	21	–	10	.677
Detroit	7	–	9	.438	12	–	18	.400
Illinois-Chicago	6	–	10	.375	16	–	14	.533
Oakland	6	–	10	.375	12	–	18	.400
Milwaukee	5	–	11	.313	10	–	20	.333
Valparaiso	2	–	14	.125	6	–	24	.200
† 2015 Horizon League Tournament winner As of 15 March 2015; Rankings from AP poll

2014–15 Ivy League women's basketball standings
	Conf.				Overall
Team	W		L	PCT	W		L	PCT
No. 13 Princeton^{†}	14	–	0	1.000	31	–	1	.969
Penn	11	–	3	.786	21	–	9	.700
Harvard	7	–	7	.500	14	–	14	.500
Yale	7	–	7	.500	13	–	15	.464
Cornell	6	–	8	.429	15	–	13	.536
Dartmouth	5	–	9	.357	14	–	14	.500
Brown	4	–	10	.286	10	–	18	.357
Columbia	2	–	12	.143	8	–	20	.286
† Ivy League winner Rankings from AP Poll

2014–15 Mid-American Conference women's basketball standings
	Conf.				Overall
Team	W		L	PCT	W		L	PCT
Ohio†	16	–	2	.889	27	–	5	.844
Akron	12	–	6	.667	22	–	8	.733
Buffalo	11	–	7	.611	19	–	12	.613
Miami (OH)	4	–	14	.222	7	–	23	.233
Kent State	3	–	15	.167	5	–	25	.167
Bowling Green	2	–	16	.111	9	–	21	.300
West
Ball State	13	–	5	.722	17	–	13	.567
Eastern Michigan	11	–	7	.611	22	–	13	.629
Western Michigan	11	–	7	.611	20	–	12	.625
Toledo	10	–	8	.556	18	–	13	.581
Northern Illinois	8	–	10	.444	12	–	17	.414
Central Michigan	7	–	11	.389	13	–	18	.419
† 2015 MAC tournament winner As of 14 March 2015; Rankings from AP poll

2014–15 MAAC women's basketball standings
	Conf.				Overall
Team	W		L	PCT	W		L	PCT
Quinnipiac†	20	–	0	1.000	31	–	4	.886
Marist	15	–	5	.750	21	–	12	.636
Fairfield	13	–	7	.650	15	–	16	.484
Iona	12	–	8	.600	15	–	15	.500
Siena	11	–	9	.550	22	–	13	.629
Niagara	9	–	11	.450	14	–	17	.452
Rider	8	–	12	.400	11	–	20	.355
Canisius	8	–	12	.400	10	–	20	.333
Monmouth	8	–	12	.400	13	–	18	.419
Saint Peter's	4	–	16	.200	5	–	26	.161
Manhattan	2	–	18	.100	3	–	27	.100
† 2015 MAAC tournament winner As of March 30, 2015; Rankings from AP poll

2014–15 MEAC women's basketball standings
	Conf.				Overall
Team	W		L	PCT	W		L	PCT
Hampton	14	–	2	.875	19	–	13	.594
Savannah State*†	13	–	3	.813	21	–	11	.656
North Carolina A&T	12	–	4	.750	20	–	11	.645
Norfolk State	11	–	5	.688	14	–	16	.467
Bethune-Cookman	9	–	7	.563	13	–	7	.650
South Carolina State	9	–	7	.563	16	–	12	.571
Maryland-Eastern Shore	8	–	8	.500	14	–	17	.452
Morgan State	8	–	8	.500	11	–	19	.367
Florida A&M	5	–	11	.313	8	–	21	.276
Coppin State	5	–	11	.313	7	–	22	.241
North Carolina Central	5	–	11	.313	7	–	22	.241
Howard	3	–	13	.188	4	–	27	.129
Delaware State	2	–	14	.125	5	–	25	.167
† 2015 MEAC tournament winner As of 20 March 2015; Rankings from AP poll *Facing level 1 sanctions due to APR penalties

2014–15 Missouri Valley Conference women's basketball standings
	Conf.				Overall
Team	W		L	PCT	W		L	PCT
Wichita State	17	–	1	.944	28	–	4	.875
Drake	15	–	3	.833	20	–	10	.667
Missouri State	13	–	5	.722	17	–	13	.567
Northern Iowa	12	–	6	.667	17	–	14	.548
Southern Illinois	10	–	8	.556	17	–	13	.567
Indiana State	7	–	11	.389	17	–	13	.567
Evansville	6	–	12	.333	13	–	18	.419
Bradley	5	–	13	.278	6	–	24	.200
Loyola-Chicago	3	–	15	.167	6	–	25	.194
Illinois State	2	–	16	.111	2	–	28	.067
† 2015 MVC tournament winner As of 14 March 2015; Rankings from AP poll

2014–15 Mountain West Conference women's basketball standings
	Conf.				Overall
Team	W		L	PCT	W		L	PCT
Colorado State	15	–	3	.833	23	–	8	.742
New Mexico	14	–	4	.778	21	–	13	.618
Fresno State	13	–	5	.722	23	–	10	.697
Boise State †	11	–	7	.611	21	–	11	.656
Wyoming	10	–	8	.556	16	–	14	.533
UNLV	10	–	8	.556	13	–	17	.433
San Diego State	8	–	10	.444	12	–	19	.387
San Jose State	7	–	11	.389	15	–	17	.469
Nevada	5	–	13	.278	9	–	21	.300
Utah State	5	–	13	.278	8	–	23	.258
Air Force	1	–	17	.056	2	–	28	.067
† 2015 MWC tournament winner Rankings from AP poll

2014–15 Northeast Conference women's basketball standings
	Conf.				Overall
Team	W		L	PCT	W		L	PCT
Bryant	14	–	4	.778	22	–	9	.710
Central Connecticut	14	–	4	.778	19	–	13	.594
Robert Morris	13	–	5	.722	17	–	15	.531
Sacred Heart	11	–	7	.611	16	–	13	.552
St. Francis Brooklyn†	9	–	9	.500	15	–	19	.441
Fairleigh Dickinson	7	–	11	.389	10	–	20	.333
LIU Brooklyn	6	–	12	.333	9	–	21	.300
Mount St. Mary's	6	–	12	.333	8	–	22	.267
Wagner	5	–	13	.278	7	–	22	.241
Saint Francis (PA)	5	–	13	.278	6	–	23	.207
† 2015 NEC tournament winner As of March 15, 2015; Rankings from AP poll

2014–15 Ohio Valley Conference women's basketball standings
	Conf.				Overall
Team	W		L	PCT	W		L	PCT
West
UT Martin	16	–	0	1.000	22	–	10	.688
SIU Edwardsville	13	–	3	.813	19	–	12	.613
Austin Peay	7	–	9	.438	10	–	20	.333
Eastern Illinois	7	–	9	.438	10	–	20	.333
Southeast Missouri State	3	–	13	.188	10	–	19	.345
Murray State	3	–	13	.188	8	–	21	.276
East
Tennessee State†	12	–	4	.750	18	–	13	.581
Jacksonville State	10	–	6	.625	19	–	10	.655
Belmont	10	–	6	.625	14	–	17	.452
Morehead State	8	–	8	.500	12	–	18	.400
Eastern Kentucky	4	–	12	.250	9	–	17	.346
Tennessee Tech	3	–	13	.188	6	–	23	.207
† 2015 OVC tournament winner As of 20 March 2015; Rankings from AP poll

2014–15 Pac-12 Conference women's basketball standings
	Conf.				Overall
Team	W		L	PCT	W		L	PCT
No. 10 Oregon State	16	–	2	.889	27	–	5	.844
No. 9 Arizona State	15	–	3	.833	29	–	6	.829
No. 14 Stanford^{†}	13	–	5	.722	26	–	10	.722
No. 24 California	13	–	5	.722	23	–	10	.697
Washington	11	–	7	.611	23	–	10	.697
UCLA	8	–	10	.444	19	–	18	.514
Washington State	7	–	11	.389	17	–	15	.531
USC	7	–	11	.389	15	–	15	.500
Colorado	6	–	12	.333	15	–	17	.469
Oregon	6	–	12	.333	13	–	17	.433
Arizona	3	–	15	.167	10	–	20	.333
Utah	3	–	15	.167	9	–	22	.290
† 2015 Pac-12 Tournament winner As of April 4, 2015; Rankings from AP Poll

2014–15 Patriot League women's basketball standings
	Conf.				Overall
Team	W		L	PCT	W		L	PCT
American†	16	–	2	.889	24	–	8	.750
Army	14	–	4	.778	23	–	8	.742
Holy Cross	11	–	7	.611	15	–	17	.469
Bucknell	10	–	8	.556	18	–	12	.600
Navy	10	–	8	.556	17	–	14	.548
Lehigh	9	–	9	.500	19	–	12	.613
Colgate	7	–	11	.389	9	–	22	.290
Lafayette	6	–	12	.333	14	–	17	.452
Loyola (MD)	5	–	13	.278	7	–	23	.233
Boston University	2	–	16	.111	5	–	25	.167
† 2015 Patriot League tournament winner As of March 19, 2015; Rankings from AP poll

2014–15 SEC women's basketball standings
	Conf.				Overall
Team	W		L	PCT	W		L	PCT
No. 3 South Carolina*^{†}	15	–	1	.938	34	–	3	.919
No. 6 Tennessee	15	–	1	.938	30	–	6	.833
No. 12 Mississippi State	11	–	5	.688	27	–	7	.794
No. 11 Kentucky	10	–	6	.625	24	–	10	.706
No. 21 Texas A&M	10	–	6	.625	23	–	10	.697
LSU	10	–	6	.625	17	–	14	.548
Missouri	7	–	9	.438	19	–	14	.576
Ole Miss	7	–	9	.438	19	–	14	.576
Georgia	6	–	10	.375	19	–	12	.613
Arkansas	6	–	10	.375	18	–	14	.563
Vanderbilt	5	–	11	.313	15	–	16	.484
Florida	5	–	11	.313	13	–	17	.433
Auburn	3	–	13	.188	13	–	18	.419
Alabama	2	–	14	.125	13	–	19	.406
† 2015 SEC tournament winner Rankings from AP poll

2014–15 Southern Conference women's basketball standings
	Conf.				Overall
Team	W		L	PCT	W		L	PCT
Chattanooga	14	–	0	1.000	27	–	3	.900
East Tennessee State	11	–	3	.786	20	–	10	.667
Mercer	9	–	5	.643	18	–	13	.581
Samford	8	–	6	.571	15	–	15	.500
Furman	7	–	7	.500	19	–	12	.613
Western Carolina	3	–	11	.214	11	–	19	.367
Wofford	3	–	11	.214	8	–	22	.267
UNC Greensboro	1	–	13	.071	6	–	24	.200
† 2015 SoCon Tournament winner As of February 28, 2015; Rankings from AP poll

2014–15 Southland Conference women's basketball standings
	Conf.				Overall
Team	W		L	PCT	W		L	PCT
Stephen F. Austin***	16	–	2	.889	23	–	8	.742
Lamar	14	–	4	.778	17	–	13	.567
Nicholls State	13	–	5	.722	17	–	13	.567
Texas A&M-CC	12	–	6	.667	16	–	14	.533
McNeese State	11	–	7	.611	18	–	14	.563
Northwestern State†	10	–	8	.556	19	–	15	.559
Central Arkansas	10	–	8	.556	17	–	14	.548
Abilene Christian*	9	–	9	.500	17	–	12	.586
Houston Baptist	6	–	12	.333	15	–	18	.455
New Orleans**	6	–	12	.333	8	–	19	.296
Sam Houston State	5	–	13	.278	6	–	22	.214
SE Louisiana	3	–	15	.167	7	–	22	.241
Incarnate Word*	2	–	16	.111	5	–	24	.172
† 2015 Southland tournament winner As of March 21, 2015; *Ineligible for postseason play due to Div. I transition **Facing level 2 sanctions due to APR penalties ***Southland tournament #1 seed Rankings from AP poll

2014–15 SWAC women's basketball standings
	Conf.				Overall
Team	W		L	PCT	W		L	PCT
Texas Southern	16	–	2	.889	19	–	10	.655
Southern*	15	–	3	.833	19	–	12	.613
Alabama State†	10	–	8	.556	17	–	14	.548
Jackson State	10	–	8	.556	14	–	17	.452
Prairie View A&M	10	–	8	.556	14	–	18	.438
Alcorn State	9	–	9	.500	10	–	18	.357
Grambling State	7	–	11	.389	10	–	20	.333
Arkansas-Pine Bluff @	5	–	13	.278	7	–	22	.241
Alabama A&M	5	–	13	.278	6	–	24	.200
Mississippi Valley State	2	–	16	.111	4	–	26	.133
† 2015 SWAC tournament winner As of 14 March 2015; Rankings from AP poll *ineligible for postseason play for failure to supply usable academic data to the NCAA @-ineligible for postseason play due to low APR

2014–15 Sun Belt Conference women's basketball standings
	Conf.				Overall
Team	W		L	PCT	W		L	PCT
Arkansas–Little Rock †	18	–	2	.900	25	–	4	.862
Arkansas State	16	–	4	.800	21	–	9	.700
Troy	15	–	5	.750	20	–	9	.690
UT Arlington	11	–	9	.550	17	–	12	.586
Texas State	11	–	9	.550	16	–	13	.552
Louisiana–Lafayette	10	–	10	.500	18	–	11	.621
Appalachian State	9	–	11	.450	14	–	15	.483
Georgia State	8	–	12	.400	13	–	16	.448
Louisiana–Monroe	8	–	12	.400	12	–	17	.414
Georgia Southern	2	–	18	.100	5	–	24	.172
South Alabama	2	–	18	.100	5	–	24	.172
† 2015 Sun Belt tournament winner

2014–15 Summit League women's basketball standings
	Conf.				Overall
Team	W		L	PCT	W		L	PCT
South Dakota	13	–	3	.813	26	–	8	.765
South Dakota State†	12	–	4	.750	24	–	9	.727
Western Illinois	9	–	7	.563	17	–	13	.567
Oral Roberts	9	–	7	.563	18	–	16	.529
IUPUI	9	–	7	.563	15	–	16	.484
North Dakota State	7	–	9	.438	11	–	18	.379
Omaha*	5	–	11	.313	10	–	18	.357
Denver	5	–	11	.313	8	–	23	.258
IPFW	3	–	13	.188	9	–	21	.300
† 2015 Summit League Tournament winner As of March 22, 2015; Rankings from AP Poll *ineligible for postseason due to Div. I transition

2014–15 West Coast Conference women's basketball standings
	Conf.				Overall
Team	W		L	PCT	W		L	PCT
Gonzaga	16	–	2	.889	26	–	8	.765
San Diego	14	–	4	.778	25	–	7	.781
Pacific	13	–	5	.722	21	–	10	.677
Saint Mary's	13	–	5	.722	23	–	11	.676
BYU †	12	–	6	.667	23	–	10	.697
San Francisco	8	–	10	.444	19	–	14	.576
Santa Clara	5	–	13	.278	11	–	18	.379
Loyola Marymount	4	–	14	.222	7	–	24	.226
Pepperdine	3	–	15	.167	8	–	22	.267
Portland	2	–	16	.111	4	–	26	.133
† Tournament winner As of March 29, 2015; Rankings from AP poll

2014–15 WAC women's basketball standings
	Conf.				Overall
Team	W		L	PCT	W		L	PCT
New Mexico State	13	–	1	.929	22	–	8	.733
Cal State Bakersfield	11	–	3	.786	23	–	9	.719
Texas-Pan American	9	–	5	.643	19	–	15	.559
Grand Canyon*	7	–	7	.500	13	–	14	.481
Seattle U	6	–	8	.429	10	–	21	.323
Utah Valley	5	–	9	.357	11	–	19	.367
UMKC	4	–	10	.286	6	–	24	.200
Chicago State	1	–	13	.071	4	–	25	.138
† 2015 WAC tournament winner As of 21 March 2015 (UTC) * Grand Canyon ineligible for WAC Basketball Tournament as part of reclassification from Division II; Rankings from AP poll

== Award winners ==
=== All-America teams ===
The NCAA has never recognized a consensus All-America team in women's basketball. This differs from the practice in men's basketball, in which the NCAA uses a combination of selections by the Associated Press (AP), the National Association of Basketball Coaches (NABC), the Sporting News, and the United States Basketball Writers Association (USBWA) to determine a consensus All-America team. The selection of a consensus team is possible because all four organizations select at least a first and second team, with only the USBWA not selecting a third team.

However, of the major selectors in women's basketball, only the AP divides its selections into separate teams. The women's counterpart to the NABC, the Women's Basketball Coaches Association (WBCA), selects a single 10-member (plus ties) team, as does the USBWA. The NCAA does not recognize Sporting News as an All-America selector in women's basketball.

With that in mind, the following players were named to at least two of the three major teams:

"Consensus" All-Americans
Player	Position	Class	School	AP	USBWA	WBCA
Brittany Boyd	G	Senior	California	2nd	—	Yes
Nina Davis	F	Sophomore	Baylor	1st	Yes	Yes
Moriah Jefferson	G	Junior	Connecticut	2nd	Yes	Yes
Samantha Logic	PG	Senior	Iowa	3rd	Yes	Yes
Jewell Loyd	G	Junior	Notre Dame	1st	Yes	Yes
Kelsey Mitchell	G	Freshman	Ohio State	2nd	Yes	—
Tiffany Mitchell	G	Junior	South Carolina	1st	Yes	Yes
Kaleena Mosqueda-Lewis	F	Senior	Connecticut	2nd	Yes	Yes
Breanna Stewart	PF/SF	Junior	Connecticut	1st	Yes	Yes
Elizabeth Williams	F/C	Senior	Duke	2nd	Yes	Yes
Amanda Zahui B.	C	Sophomore	Minnesota	1st	Yes	Yes

=== Major player of the year awards ===
- Wooden Award: Breanna Stewart, Connecticut
- Naismith Award: Breanna Stewart, Connecticut
- Associated Press Player of the Year: Breanna Stewart, Connecticut
- Wade Trophy: Breanna Stewart, Connecticut
- espnW National Player of the Year: Jewell Loyd, Notre Dame

=== Major freshman of the year awards ===
- USBWA National Freshman of the Year (USBWA): Kelsey Mitchell, Ohio State

=== Major coach of the year awards ===
- Associated Press Coach of the Year: Sue Semrau, Florida State
- Naismith College Coach of the Year: Courtney Banghart, Princeton
- WBCA National Coach of the Year Award: Sue Semrau, Florida State

=== Other major awards ===
- Nancy Lieberman Award (best point guard): Moriah Jefferson, Connecticut
- Senior CLASS Award (top senior): Samantha Logic, Iowa
- Maggie Dixon Award (top first-year head coach): Lisa Fortier, Gonzaga
- Academic All-American of the Year (top scholar-athlete): Ashley Luke, Western Illinois
- Elite 89 Award (top GPA among upperclass players at Final Four):

== Coaching changes ==
A number of teams changed coaches during and after the season.

Team	Former coach	Interim coach	New coach	Reason
Air Force	Andrea Williams		Chris Gobrecht	Williams was fired after five seasons and a 22–128 overall record, including a 2–28 record this season. Yale's Gobrecht was hired as the next head coach.
Detroit	Autumn Rademacher		Bernard Scott	Rademacher was fired after four seasons and a 101–120 overall record. She led the Titans to the 2013 WBI title and a WNIT berth in 2012, but never made the NCAA Tournament and went 12–18 this season.
FIU	Cindy Russo	Inge Nissen	Marlin Chinn	Russo announced her resignation during her 36th season at FIU on January 22, effective immediately. In her announcement, she alluded to burnout from balancing coaching with caring for her ailing mother, who died earlier this season. Russo finished with a 667–371 record at FIU and 707–391 overall. FIU hired Maryland assistant Chinn after the season.
Georgia	Andy Landers		Joni Taylor	On March 16, Women's Basketball Hall of Fame member Landers announced his retirement. Hired in 1979 as the program's first full-time coach, he led the Lady Bulldogs to 31 NCAA Tournament appearances, five Final Fours, seven SEC regular-season titles, and four SEC Tournament crowns. Georgia stayed in-house for its new coach, promoting top assistant Joni Taylor on April 12.
Kansas	Bonnie Henrickson		Brandon Schneider	Henrickson was fired after 11 seasons. Although the Jayhawks made two NCAA Sweet Sixteen appearances, those were the team's only NCAA tournament appearances under Henrickson, and the team never finished higher than sixth in the Big 12.
Lafayette	Dianne Nolan		Theresa Grentz	On March 26, Nolan announced her retirement after five seasons at Lafayette and 38 seasons overall. She finishes with a 575–509 overall record, with 456 of those wins coming during her 28 seasons at Fairfield. Lafayette hired Women's Hall of Fame coach Grentz, who returned to college head coaching after an eight-year absence.
North Texas	Mike Petersen		Jalie Mitchell	On March 10, Petersen was fired after three seasons with a 28–61 record, ending with a 5–24 season in which UNT failed to make the Conference USA tournament. The Mean Green hired Mitchell, their career leading scorer, after she served three seasons as an assistant at Texas.
Pacific	Lynne Roberts		Bradley Davis	Roberts left for the Utah job. The school promoted top assistant Davis to head coach.
Rice	Greg Williams		Tina Langley	Williams announced his retirement on March 17 after 10 seasons at his alma mater. Like fellow C-USA member FIU, Rice hired a Maryland assistant in Langley.
Stephen F. Austin	Brandon Schneider		Mark Kellogg	Schneider left for the Kansas job.
Utah	Anthony Levrets		Lynne Roberts	Levrets was fired after five seasons and a 78–87 overall record, with a 9–21 overall and 3–15 Pac-12 record in 2014–15.
Yale	Chris Gobrecht		Allison Guth	Gobrecht left for an Air Force job.

== See also ==
- 2014–15 NCAA Division I men's basketball season
