= 2014–15 Green Bay Phoenix women's basketball team =

Intercollegiate basketball season

2014–15 Green Bay Phoenix women's basketball

Horizon League Regular Season & Tournament Champions

NCAA Women's Tournament, round of 64
- Conference: Horizon League
- Record: 28–5 (15–1 Horizon)
- Head coach: Kevin Borseth (12th season)
- Assistant coaches: Amanda Leonhard-Perry; Sarah Bronk; Megan Vogel
- Home arena: Kress Events Center

2014–15 Horizon League women's basketball standings
	Conf.				Overall
Team	W		L	PCT	W		L	PCT
Green Bay †	15	–	1	.938	28	–	5	.848
Wright State	12	–	4	.750	25	–	8	.758
Cleveland State	10	–	6	.625	19	–	12	.613
Youngstown State	9	–	7	.563	21	–	10	.677
Detroit	7	–	9	.438	12	–	18	.400
Illinois-Chicago	6	–	10	.375	16	–	14	.533
Oakland	6	–	10	.375	12	–	18	.400
Milwaukee	5	–	11	.313	10	–	20	.333
Valparaiso	2	–	14	.125	6	–	24	.200
† 2015 Horizon League Tournament winner As of 15 March 2015; Rankings from AP poll

The 2014–15 Green Bay Phoenix women's basketball team represented the University of Wisconsin-Green Bay in the 2014–15 NCAA Division I women's basketball season. Their head coach, Kevin Borseth, was in the third season of his second stint at Green Bay and 12th overall at the school. The Phoenix played their home games at the Kress Events Center and were members of the Horizon League. It was the 36th season of Green Bay women's basketball. They finished the season 28–5, 15–1 in Horizon play to win the Horizon League regular and tournament titles to earn an automatic to the 2015 NCAA Division I women's basketball tournament. They lost to then-unbeaten Princeton in the first round.

== Roster ==
2014–15 Green Bay Phoenix women's basketball team
Players
Coaches

Pos.	#	Name	Height	Year	Previous school	Hometown
G	2	Tesha Buck	5 ft 11 in (1.8 m)	So	Red Wing	Red Wing, Minn.
G	21	Ellen Edison	5 ft 9 in (1.75 m)	Sr	Maple Grove	Maple Grove, Minn.
G	5	Laken James	5 ft 9 in (1.75 m)	Fr	Oconto	Oconto, Wis.
F	10	Mehryn Kraker	6 ft 0 in (1.83 m)	RS So	West Allis Central	West Allis, Wis.
G	24	Allie LeClaire	5 ft 10 in (1.78 m)	Fr	Notre Dame Academy	Green Bay, Wis.
F	20	Jessica Lindstrom	6 ft 1 in (1.85 m)	Fr	Superior	Superior, Wis.
G	4	Kaili Lukan	5 ft 10 in (1.78 m)	Jr	Barrie Central	Barrie, Ontario, Canada
G	14	Megan Lukan	5 ft 7 in (1.7 m)	RS Sr	Barrie Central	Barrie, Ontario, Canada
F	44	Mariah Monke	6 ft 2 in (1.88 m)	RS So	Fergus Falls	Fergus Falls, Minn.
G/F	55	Sam Terry	6 ft 0 in (1.83 m)	So	Baraboo	Baraboo, Wis.
C	33	Lexi Weitzer	6 ft 3 in (1.91 m)	So	Waukesha South	Waukesha, Wis.
G	1	Jen Wellnitz	5 ft 8 in (1.73 m)	Fr	Black Hawk	South Wayne, Wis.

Head coach

Kevin Borseth

Assistant coach(es)

Amanda Leonhard-Perry
Sarah Bronk
Megan Vogel

Legend

- (C) Team captain
- (S) Suspended
- (I) Ineligible
- (W) Walk-on
- Injured
- Current redshirt

Roster
Last update: 2014-07-23

== Schedule ==
Date time, TV	Rank^{#}	Opponent^{#}	Result	Record	Site (attendance) city, state
Exhibition
11/01/2014*; 1:00 pm		Michigan Tech	W 74–50	–	Kress Events Center (2,084); Green Bay, WI
11/06/2014*; 7:00 pm		UW–Oshkosh	W 61–34	–	Kress Events Center (2,347); Green Bay, WI
Regular Season
11/15/2014*; 1:00 pm		at Marquette	W 94–66	1–0	Al McGuire Center (1,399); Milwaukee, WI
11/17/2014*; 7:00 pm		at Vanderbilt	L 64–68 ^{OT}	1–1	Memorial Gymnasium (2,557); Nashville, TN
11/19/2014*; 4:30 pm		at No. 24 Purdue	W 81–78 ^{2OT}	2–1	Mackey Arena (5,730); West Lafayette, IN
11/22/2014*; 1:00 pm, ESPN3		Duquesne	W 84–52	3–1	Kress Events Center (1,914); Green Bay, WI
11/28/2014*; 12:00 pm		vs. Georgia Tech; Gulf Coast Showcase Quarterfinals	W 71–50	4–1	Germain Arena (N/A); Estero, FL
11/29/2014*; 6:00 pm		vs. Arizona State; Gulf Coast Showcase Semifinals	W 63–57	5–1	Germain Arena (N/A); Estero, FL
11/30/2014*; 7:30 pm, SNY		vs. No. 3 Connecticut; Gulf Coast Showcase championship	L 53–89	5–2	Germain Arena (3,217); Estero, FL
12/06/2014*; 1:00 pm, ESPN3		Western Michigan	W 70–55	6–2	Kress Events Center (2,061); Green Bay, WI
12/10/2014*; 7:00 pm, ESPN3		at South Dakota State	W 77–75	7–2	Frost Arena (1,802); Brookings, SD
12/13/2014*; 7:00 pm, TWCSC/ESPN3		Wisconsin	W 63–53	8–2	Kress Events Center (3,581); Green Bay, WI
12/20/2014*; 1:00 pm, ESPN3		Vermont	W 60–40	9–2	Kress Events Center (2,218); Green Bay, WI
12/28/2014*; 1:00 pm	No. 24	at Dayton	L 66–72	9–3	UD Arena (1,755); Dayton, OH
01/03/2015*; 1:00 pm, ESPN3		Davenport	W 53–40	10–3	Kress Events Center (2,268); Green Bay, WI
Horizon League regular season
01/07/2015; 6:00 pm, ESPN3		at Wright State	W 68–59	11–3 (1–0)	Nutter Center (513); Dayton, OH
01/10/2015; 1:00 pm, ESPN3		Youngstown State	W 66–43	12–3 (2–0)	Kress Events Center (2,287); Green Bay, WI
01/17/2015; 1:00 pm, TWCSC/ESPN3		Milwaukee	W 63–37	13–3 (3–0)	Kress Events Center (2,956); Green Bay, WI
01/22/2015; 6:00 pm, ESPN3		at Cleveland State	W 65–61	14–3 (4–0)	Wolstein Center (257); Cleveland, OH
01/24/2015; 1:00 pm, ESPN3		at Detroit	W 75–58	15–3 (5–0)	Calihan Hall (249); Detroit, MI
01/29/2015; 7:00 pm, ESPN3		at Valparaiso	W 67–52	16–3 (6–0)	Athletics–Recreation Center (416); Valparaiso, IN
01/31/2015; 7:00 pm, ESPN3		at UIC	W 64–45	17–3 (7–0)	UIC Pavilion (581); Chicago, IL
02/04/2015; 7:00 pm, TWCSC/ESPN3		Oakland	L 67–70	17–4 (7–1)	Kress Events Center (2,075); Green Bay, WI
02/07/2015; 1:00 pm, ESPN3		Cleveland State	W 74–50	18–4 (8–1)	Kress Events Center (2,734); Green Bay, WI
02/12/2015; 7:00 pm, TWCSC/ESPN3		Wright State	W 61–45	19–4 (9–1)	Kress Events Center (2,187); Green Bay, WI
02/14/2015; 2:00 pm, TWCSC/ESPN3		at Milwaukee	W 79–62	20–4 (10–1)	Klotsche Center (1,055); Milwaukee, WI
02/19/2015; 7:00 pm, ESPN3		Valparaiso	W 87–45	21–4 (11–1)	Kress Events Center (1,856); Green Bay, WI
02/21/2015; 1:00 pm, ESPN3		UIC	W 71–32	22–4 (12–1)	Kress Events Center (2,829); Green Bay, WI
02/26/2015; 6:00 pm, ESPN3		at Oakland	W 70–55	23–4 (13–1)	Athletics Center O'rena (452); Rochester, MI
02/28/2015; 3:30 pm, ESPN3		at Youngstown State	W 73–27	24–4 (14–1)	Beeghly Center (3,195); Youngstown, OH
03/07/2015; 1:00 pm, ESPN3		Detroit	W 52–51	25–4 (15–1)	Kress Events Center (3,342); Green Bay, WI
2015 Horizon League Tournament
03/11/2015; 7:00 pm, ESPN3		Milwaukee; Quarterfinal	W 74–62	26–4	Kress Events Center (1,672); Green Bay, WI
03/13/2015; 7:30 pm, TWCSC/ESPN3		Youngstown State; Semifinal	W 63–54	27–4	Kress Events Center (2,217); Green Bay, WI
03/15/2015; 2:00 pm, ESPNU		Wright State; Championship Game	W 86–77 ^{OT}	28–4	Kress Events Center (2,214); Green Bay, WI
NCAA Women's Tournament
03/21/2015*; 10:05 am, ESPN2		vs. No. 13 Princeton; First Round	L 70–80	28–5	Xfinity Center (N/A); College Park, MD
*Non-conference game. ^{#}Rankings from AP Poll. (#) Tournament seedings in parentheses. All times are in Central Time.

== Rankings ==
Ranking movement Legend: ██ Increase in ranking. ██ Decrease in ranking. NR = Not ranked. RV = Received votes.
Poll	Pre	Wk 2	Wk 3	Wk 4	Wk 5	Wk 6	Wk 7	Wk 8	Wk 9	Wk 10	Wk 11	Wk 12	Wk 13	Wk 14	Wk 15	Wk 16	Wk 17	Wk 18	Final
AP	RV	RV	RV	RV	RV	RV	24	RV	RV	RV	RV	RV	RV	RV	RV	RV	RV	RV	RV
Coaches	NR	NR	NR	RV	RV	RV	RV	NR	NR	RV	RV	NR	NR	NR	NR	NR	NR	NR	NR

== See also ==
2014–15 Green Bay Phoenix men's basketball team
