= 2015 Horizon League women's basketball tournament =

- Classification: Division I
- Season: 2014–15
- Teams: 9
- First round site: Campus sites
- Semifinals site: Kress Events Center; Green Bay, Wisconsin
- Finals site: Kress Events Center; Green Bay
- Champions: Green Bay (13th title)
- Winning coach: Kevin Borseth (9th title)
- MVP: Tesha Buck (Green Bay)
- Television: ESPN3, TWCS, and ESPNU

The 2015 Horizon League women's basketball tournament, held from March 9–15, concluded the 2014–15 season of the Horizon League. For the first time, every game was available on an ESPN Network. Rounds 1 & 2 were on ESPN3, with the semifinals on TWCS and simulcast on ESPN3. The championship was on ESPNU. The tournament champion received an automatic bid to the 2015 NCAA tournament.

2014–15 Horizon League women's basketball standings
	Conf.				Overall
Team	W		L	PCT	W		L	PCT
Green Bay †	15	–	1	.938	28	–	5	.848
Wright State	12	–	4	.750	25	–	8	.758
Cleveland State	10	–	6	.625	19	–	12	.613
Youngstown State	9	–	7	.563	21	–	10	.677
Detroit	7	–	9	.438	12	–	18	.400
Illinois-Chicago	6	–	10	.375	16	–	14	.533
Oakland	6	–	10	.375	12	–	18	.400
Milwaukee	5	–	11	.313	10	–	20	.333
Valparaiso	2	–	14	.125	6	–	24	.200
† 2015 Horizon League Tournament winner As of 15 March 2015; Rankings from AP poll

== Seeds ==
All 9 Horizon League schools participated in the tournament. Teams were seeded by 2014–15 Horizon League season record. The top 7 teams received a first-round bye.

Seeding for the tournament was determined at the close of the regular conference season:

Seed	Team	Record	Tiebreaker
1	Green Bay	16–2	
2	Milwaukee	12–4	2–0 vs. Wright State
3	Wright State	12–4	0–2 vs. Milwaukee
4	Detroit	9–7	
5	Northern Kentucky	9–9	2–0 vs. Youngstown State
6	Youngstown State	9–9	0–2 vs. Northern Kentucky
7	Oakland	7–11	
8	Cleveland State	6–12	
9	Valparaiso	5–13	
9	UIC	3–15	

== Schedule ==
Game	Time*	Matchup^{#}	Television
First round – Monday, March 9
1	7:00 PM	#9 Valparaiso at #8 Milwaukee	ESPN3
Quarterfinals - Wednesday, March 11
2	7:00 PM	#9 Milwaukee at #1 Green Bay	ESPN3
3	7:00 PM	#5 Detroit at #4 Youngstown State	ESPN3
4	7:00 PM	#6 UIC at #3 Cleveland State	ESPN3
5	7:00 PM	#7 Oakland at #2 Wright State	ESPN3
Semifinals – Friday, March 13 (Hosted by Green Bay)
6	6:00 PM	#3 Cleveland State vs. #2 Wright State	TWCS
7	8:30 PM	#4 Youngstown State at #1 Green Bay	TWCS
Championship – Sunday, March 15
8	1:00 PM	#2 Wright State at #1 Green Bay	ESPNU
*First and second round times are local time. Semifinal and championship times are in Eastern Time Zone. *Rankings denote tournament seeding.

== Bracket ==
First round Monday, March 9 Hosted by Milwaukee
8	Milwaukee	77
9	Valparaiso	64

Quarterfinals; Wednesday, March 11; Hosted on campus sites
1	Green Bay	74
8	Milwaukee	62
4	Youngstown State	73
5	Detroit	55
2	Wright State	95
7	Oakland	60
3	Cleveland State	76
6	UIC	70

Semifinals; Friday, March 13; Hosted by Green Bay
1	Green Bay	63
4	Youngstown State	54
2	Wright State	99
3	Cleveland State	87

Championship; Sunday, March 15; Hosted by Green Bay
1	Green Bay	86^{OT}
2	Wright State	77
