= 2015 Atlantic 10 women's basketball tournament =

- Classification: Division I
- Season: 2014–15
- Teams: 14
- Site: Richmond Coliseum; Richmond, VA
- Champions: George Washington (5th title)
- Winning coach: Jonathan Tsipis (1st title)
- MVP: Jonquel Jones (George Washington)
- Television: A10 Digital, ASN, CBSSN, ESPNU

2014–15 Atlantic 10 women's basketball standings
	Conf.				Overall
Team	W		L	PCT	W		L	PCT
No. 19 George Washington^{†}	15	–	1	.938	29	–	4	.879
Dayton	14	–	2	.875	28	–	7	.800
Duquesne	12	–	4	.750	23	–	11	.676
Fordham	11	–	5	.688	21	–	12	.636
Richmond	9	–	7	.563	19	–	14	.576
Rhode Island	8	–	8	.500	17	–	13	.567
Saint Joseph's	8	–	8	.500	13	–	17	.433
VCU	7	–	9	.438	16	–	14	.533
Saint Louis	7	–	9	.438	15	–	16	.484
St. Bonaventure	5	–	11	.313	15	–	15	.500
La Salle	5	–	11	.313	15	–	16	.484
George Mason	5	–	11	.313	13	–	17	.433
UMass	5	–	11	.313	12	–	18	.400
Davidson	1	–	15	.063	5	–	25	.167
† 2015 A10 Tournament winner As of 30 March 2015; Rankings from AP poll

The 2015 Atlantic 10 women's basketball tournament was played March 4–8 at the Richmond Coliseum in Richmond, Virginia. This will be a 14 team Tournament with the addition of Davidson. The top 10 seeds received a first round bye and the top 4 seeds received a double bye. The 2015 tournament champion received an automatic bid to the 2015 NCAA tournament.

George Washington won the championship by defeating Dayton in the final.

== Seeds ==
Teams are seeded by record within the conference, with a tiebreaker system to seed teams with identical conference records.

Seed	School	Conf (Overall)	Tiebreaker
#1	George Washington	15–1 (26–3)	
#2	Dayton	14–2 (23–5)	
#3	Duquesne	12–4 (20–9)	
#4	Fordham	11–5 (19–10)	
#5	Richmond	9–7 (17–12)	
#6	Rhode Island	8–8 (16–12)	1–0 vs. St. Joseph's
#7	Saint Joseph's	8–8 (12–16)	0–1 vs. Rhode Island
#8	VCU	7–9 (16–13)	1–0 vs. St. Louis
#9	Saint Louis	7–9 (14–15)	0–1 vs. VCU
#10	George Mason	5–11 (13–16)	2–1 vs. La Salle, St. Bona, UMass
#11	La Salle	5–11 (14–15)	2–2 vs. GM, St. Bona, UMass; 1-0 vs. St. Bona
#12	St. Bonaventure	5–11 (15–14)	2–2 vs. GM, La Salle, UMass; 0-1 vs. La Salle
#13	Massachusetts	5–11 (11–17)	2–3 vs. GM, La Salle, St. Bona
#14	Davidson	1–15 (5–24)	

== Schedule ==
Session	Game	Time*	Matchup^{#}	Television	Score
First round - Wednesday, March 4
1	1	4:30 pm	#13 Massachusetts vs. #12 St. Bonaventure	A10 Net	UMass 55-49
1	2	7:00 pm	#14 Davidson vs. #11 La Salle	A10 Net	La Salle, 74-63
Second round - Thursday, March 5
2	3	11:30 am	#9 Saint Louis vs. #8 VCU	A10 Net	Saint Louis, 65-58
2	4	2:00 pm	#13 Massachusetts vs. #5 Richmond	A10 Net	Richmond, 67-63
3	5	4:30 pm	#10 George Mason vs. #7 Saint Joseph's	A10 Net	Saint Joseph's 71-43
3	6	7:00 pm	#11 La Salle vs. #6 Rhode Island	A10 Net	Rhode Island 65-60
Quarterfinals - Friday, March 6
4	7	11:30 am	#9 Saint Louis vs. #1 George Washington	ASN	George Washington 77-63
4	8	2:00 pm	#5 Richmond vs. #4 Fordham	ASN	Fordham 46-45
5	9	4:30 pm	#7 Saint Joseph's vs. #2 Dayton	ASN	Dayton 80-61
5	10	7:00 pm	#6 Rhode Island vs. #3 Duquesne	ASN	Duquesne 66-53
Semifinals - Saturday, March 7
6	11	11:00 am	#1 George Washington vs. #4 Fordham	CBSSN	George Washington 72-60
6	12	1:30 pm	#2 Dayton vs. #3 Duquesne	CBSSN	Dayton 74-60
Championship - Sunday, March 8
7	13	1:00pm	#1 George Washington vs. #2 Dayton	ESPNU	George Washington 75-62

*Game times in Eastern Time. #Rankings denote tournament seeding.

== Bracket ==
First round Wednesday, March 4
12	St. Bonaventure	49
13	Massachusetts	55
11	La Salle	74
14	Davidson	63

Second round Thursday, March 5
8	VCU	58
9	Saint Louis	65
5	Richmond	67
13	Massachusetts	63
7	Saint Joseph's	71
10	George Mason	43
6	Rhode Island	65
11	La Salle	60

Quarterfinals; Friday, March 6
1	George Washington	77
9	Saint Louis	63
4	Fordham	46
5	Richmond	45
2	Dayton	80
7	Saint Joseph's	61
3	Duquesne	66
6	Rhode Island	53

Semifinals; Saturday, March 7
1	George Washington	72
4	Fordham	60
2	Dayton	74
3	Duquesne	60

Championship; Sunday, March 8
1	George Washington	75
2	Dayton	62

== See also ==
2015 Atlantic 10 men's basketball tournament
