= 2015 Southern Conference women's basketball tournament =

- Classification: Division I
- Season: 2014–15
- Teams: 10
- Site: U.S. Cellular Center; Asheville, North Carolina
- Champions: Chattanooga (16th title)
- Television: ESPN3/CSS

2014–15 Southern Conference women's basketball standings
| | Conf. | | | | Overall |
| Team | W | | L | PCT | W | | L | PCT |
|---|---|---|---|---|---|---|---|---|
| Chattanooga | 14 | – | 0 | 1.000 | 27 | – | 3 | .900 |
| East Tennessee State | 11 | – | 3 | .786 | 20 | – | 10 | .667 |
| Mercer | 9 | – | 5 | .643 | 18 | – | 13 | .581 |
| Samford | 8 | – | 6 | .571 | 15 | – | 15 | .500 |
| Furman | 7 | – | 7 | .500 | 19 | – | 12 | .613 |
| Western Carolina | 3 | – | 11 | .214 | 11 | – | 19 | .367 |
| Wofford | 3 | – | 11 | .214 | 8 | – | 22 | .267 |
| UNC Greensboro | 1 | – | 13 | .071 | 6 | – | 24 | .200 |
† 2015 SoCon Tournament winner As of February 28, 2015; Rankings from AP poll

The 2015 Southern Conference women's basketball tournament was held between Thursday, March 5 and Sunday, March 8 in Asheville, North Carolina, at Kimmel Arena and the U.S. Cellular Center. Chattanooga won their 16th tournament championship and earned the SoCon's automatic bid into the 2015 NCAA Women's Division I Basketball Tournament.

== Bracket ==
March 5, Kimmel Arena
1 | Chattanooga | 78
8 | UNC Greensboro | 44
4 | Samford | 54
5 | Furman | 65
3 | Mercer | 75
6 | Wofford | 53
2 | East Tennessee State | 73
7 | Western Carolina | 53

March 6, U.S. Cellular Center
1 | Chattanooga | 68
5 | Furman | 55
3 | Mercer | 56
2 | East Tennessee State | 66

March 8, U.S. Cellular Center
1 | Chattanooga | 61^{OT}
2 | East Tennessee State | 56
