= 2014–15 Tennessee Lady Volunteers basketball team =

Intercollegiate basketball season

2014–15 Tennessee Lady Volunteers basketball

SEC regular season co-champions

NCAA tournament, Elite Eight
- Conference: Southeastern Conference

Ranking
- Coaches: No. 5
- AP: No. 6
- Record: 30–6 (15–1 SEC)
- Head coach: Holly Warlick (3rd season)
- Assistant coaches: Kyra Elzy; Jolette Law; Dean Lockwood
- Home arena: Thompson–Boling Arena

2014–15 SEC women's basketball standings
	Conf.				Overall
Team	W		L	PCT	W		L	PCT
No. 3 South Carolina*^{†}	15	–	1	.938	34	–	3	.919
No. 6 Tennessee	15	–	1	.938	30	–	6	.833
No. 12 Mississippi State	11	–	5	.688	27	–	7	.794
No. 11 Kentucky	10	–	6	.625	24	–	10	.706
No. 21 Texas A&M	10	–	6	.625	23	–	10	.697
LSU	10	–	6	.625	17	–	14	.548
Missouri	7	–	9	.438	19	–	14	.576
Ole Miss	7	–	9	.438	19	–	14	.576
Georgia	6	–	10	.375	19	–	12	.613
Arkansas	6	–	10	.375	18	–	14	.563
Vanderbilt	5	–	11	.313	15	–	16	.484
Florida	5	–	11	.313	13	–	17	.433
Auburn	3	–	13	.188	13	–	18	.419
Alabama	2	–	14	.125	13	–	19	.406
† 2015 SEC tournament winner Rankings from AP poll

The 2014–15 Tennessee Lady Volunteers basketball team represented the University of Tennessee in the 2014–15 college basketball season. The Lady Vols, led by 3rd year head coach Holly Warlick, played their games at Thompson–Boling Arena and were members of the Southeastern Conference.

They finished the season 30–6, 15–1 SEC play to share the SEC regular season title with South Carolina. They advanced to the SEC women's tournament championship game where they lost to South Carolina. They received an at-large bid to the NCAA women's tournament, where they beat Boise State in first round, Pittsburgh in the second round, and Gonzaga in the Sweet Sixteen, before losing last year's Sweet Sixteen rematch to Maryland in the Elite Eight.

In the 2015 SEC women's basketball tournament quarterfinals, senior Ariel Massengale became only the third Tennessee player to have 1,000 points and 500 career assists.

== 2014–15 roster ==
2014–15 Tennessee Lady Volunteers women's basketball team
Players
Coaches

Pos.	#	Name	Height	Year	Previous school	Hometown
F	11	Cierra Burdick	6 ft 2 in (1.88 m)	Sr	Butler H.S.	Charlotte, N.C.
G	14	Andraya Carter	5 ft 9 in (1.75 m)	RS So	Buford H.S.	Flowery Branch, Ga.
G	10	Diamond DeShields	6 ft 1 in (1.85 m)	So	North Carolina	Norcross, Ga.
G/F	13	Kortney Dunbar	6 ft 2 in (1.88 m)	Fr	Edwardsville H.S.	Edwardsville, Ill.
F	12	Bashaara Graves	6 ft 2 in (1.88 m)	Jr	Clarksville H.S.	Clarksville, Tenn.
C	20	Isabelle Harrison (injured)	6 ft 3 in (1.91 m)	Sr	Hillsboro H.S.	Nashville, Tenn.
F	2	Jasmine Jones (injured)	6 ft 2 in (1.88 m)	Jr	Bob Jones H.S.	Madison, Ala.
PG	5	Ariel Massengale	5 ft 7 in (1.7 m)	Sr	Bolingbrook H.S.	Bolingbrook, Ill.
G	33	Alexa Middleton	5 ft 9 in (1.75 m)	Fr	Riverdale H.S.	Murfreesboro, Tenn.
C	1	Nia Moore	6 ft 3 in (1.91 m)	Jr	Bolingbrook H.S.	Chicago, Ill.
G/F	31	Jaime Nared	6 ft 2 in (1.88 m)	Fr	Westview H.S.	Portland, Ore.
G	0	Jordan Reynolds	5 ft 11 in (1.8 m)	So	Central Catholic H.S.	Portland, Ore.
C	21	Mercedes Russell (redshirt)	6 ft 6 in (1.98 m)	RS So	Springfield H.S.	Springfield, Ore.
G	4	Jannah Tucker	6 ft 0 in (1.83 m)	RS Fr	New Town H.S.	Baltimore, Md.

Head coach

Holly Warlick

Assistant coach(es)

Kyra Elzy
Jolette Law
Dean Lockwood

Legend

- (C) Team captain
- (S) Suspended
- (I) Ineligible
- (W) Walk-on
- Injured
- Current redshirt

Roster
Last update: 2014-09-14

== Rankings ==
Ranking movement Legend: ██ Increase in ranking. ██ Decrease in ranking. NR = Not ranked. RV = Received votes.
Poll	Pre	Wk 2	Wk 3	Wk 4	Wk 5	Wk 6	Wk 7	Wk 8	Wk 9	Wk 10	Wk 11	Wk 12	Wk 13	Wk 14	Wk 15	Wk 16	Wk 17	Wk 18	Final
AP	4	4	4	14	11	11	8	8	7	6	5	6	6	6	6	6	5	6	6
Coaches	4	5	5	14	13	12	11	9	9	6	7	6	6	6	6	6	5	5	5

== Schedule and results ==
Date time, TV	Rank^{#}	Opponent^{#}	Result	Record	Site (attendance) city, state
Exhibition
Nov 9, 2014*; 2:00 p.m.	No. 4	Carson–Newman	W 90–57	–	Thompson–Boling Arena (9,924); Knoxville, TN
Regular Season
Nov 14, 2014*; 7:00 p.m.	No. 4	Penn	W 97–52	1–0	Thompson–Boling Arena (9,706); Knoxville, TN
Nov 17, 2014*; 7:00 p.m.	No. 4	Oral Roberts	W 91–39	2–0	Thompson–Boling Arena (8,861); Knoxville, TN
Nov 21, 2014*; 7:00 p.m.	No. 4	Winthrop	W 81–48	3–0	Thompson–Boling Arena (9,267); Knoxville, TN
Nov 24, 2014*; 7:00 p.m.	No. 4	Tennessee State	W 97–46	4–0	Thompson–Boling Arena (9,137); Knoxville, TN
Nov 26, 2014*; 7:00 p.m.	No. 4	at Chattanooga	L 63–67	4–1	McKenzie Arena (4,160); Chattanooga, TN
Nov 30, 2014*; 6:30 p.m., FS1	No. 4	at No. 6 Texas	L 57–72	4–2	Frank Erwin Center (4,198); Austin, TX
Dec 3, 2014*; 7:00 p.m.	No. 14	Saint Francis (PA)	W 111–44	5–2	Thompson–Boling Arena (9,126); Knoxville, TN
Dec 7, 2014*; 3:00 p.m., ESPN3	No. 14	at Lipscomb	W 85–51	6–2	Allen Arena (2,742); Nashville, TN
Dec 14, 2014*; 3:00 p.m., ESPN2	No. 11	at No. 17 Rutgers	W 55–45	7–2	The RAC (4,543); Piscataway, NJ
Dec 16, 2014*; 7:00 p.m., SECN	No. 11	Wichita State	W 54–51	8–2	Thompson–Boling Arena (9,026); Knoxville, TN
Dec 20, 2014*; 1:00 p.m., SECN	No. 11	No. 7 Stanford; Rivalry	W 59–40	9–2	Thompson–Boling Arena (13,056); Knoxville, TN
Dec 28, 2014*; 1:00 p.m., SECN	No. 8	No. 10 Oregon State	W 74–63	10–2	Thompson–Boling Arena (11,123); Knoxville, TN
Jan 2, 2015; 9:00 p.m., SECN	No. 8	Missouri	W 63–53	11–2 (1–0)	Thompson–Boling Arena (9,570); Knoxville, TN
Jan 5, 2015; 7:00 p.m., SECN	No. 7	at Vanderbilt; Rivalry	W 57–49	12–2 (2–0)	Memorial Gymnasium (7,212); Nashville, TN
Jan 8, 2015; 7:00 p.m., SECN	No. 7	No. 9 Texas A&M	W 81–58	13–2 (3–0)	Thompson–Boling Arena (10,507); Knoxville, TN
Jan 11, 2015; 3:00 p.m., ESPNU	No. 7	at Arkansas	W 60–51	14–2 (4–0)	Bud Walton Arena (2,344); Fayetteville, AR
Jan 15, 2015; 8:00 p.m., FSN	No. 6	at Auburn	W 54–42	15–2 (5–0)	Auburn Arena (2,590); Auburn, AL
Jan 19, 2015*; 7:00 p.m., ESPN2	No. 5	at No. 6 Notre Dame	L 77–88	15–3	Edmund P. Joyce Center (9,149); South Bend, IN
Jan 22, 2015; 7:00 p.m., SECN	No. 5	LSU	W 75–58	16–3 (6–0)	Thompson–Boling Arena (11,612); Knoxville, TN
Jan 25, 2015; 2:00 p.m., SECN	No. 5	No. 22 Georgia	W 59–51	17–3 (7–0)	Thompson–Boling Arena (13,428); Knoxville, TN
Jan 29, 2015; 7:00 p.m., SECN	No. 6	at No. 10 Kentucky; Rivalry	W 73–72	18–3 (8–0)	Memorial Coliseum (7,407); Lexington, KY
Feb 1, 2015; 3:00 p.m., SECN	No. 6	No. 18 Mississippi State	W 79–67	19–3 (9–0)	Thompson–Boling Arena (11,507); Knoxville, TN
Feb 8, 2015; 2:00 p.m., ESPNU	No. 6	at Florida	W 64–56	20–3 (10–0)	O'Connell Center (3,439); Gainesville, FL
Feb 12, 2015; 7:00 p.m.	No. 6	at Ole Miss	W 69–49	21–3 (11–0)	Tad Smith Coliseum (2,051); Oxford, MS
Feb 15, 2015; 3:00 p.m., ESPN2	No. 6	No. 10 Kentucky; Rivalry	W 72–58	22–3 (12–0)	Thompson–Boling Arena (16,013); Knoxville, TN
Feb 19, 2015; 7:00 p.m., FSN	No. 6	Alabama	W 77–56	23–3 (13–0)	Thompson–Boling Arena (9,637); Knoxville, TN
Feb 23, 2015; 9:00 p.m., ESPN2	No. 6	at No. 2 South Carolina	L 66–71	23–4 (13–1)	Colonial Life Arena (14,390); Columbia, SC
Feb 26, 2015; 9:00 p.m., SECN	No. 6	at Georgia	W 70–59	24–4 (14–1)	Stegeman Coliseum (3,624); Athens, GA
Mar 1, 2015; 5:00 p.m., SECN	No. 6	Vanderbilt; Rivalry	W 79–49	25–4 (15–1)	Thompson–Boling Arena (13,027); Knoxville, TN
2015 SEC Tournament
Mar 6, 2015; 7:00 p.m., SECN	No. 5	vs. Georgia; Quarterfinals	W 75–41	26–4	Verizon Arena (4,189); North Little Rock, AR
Mar 7, 2015; 7:30 p.m., ESPNU	No. 5	vs. No. 12 Kentucky; Semifinals / Rivalry	W 75–64	27–4	Verizon Arena (5,524); North Little Rock, AR
Mar 8, 2015; 3:30 p.m., ESPN	No. 5	vs. No. 3 South Carolina; Championship Game	L 46–62	27–5	Verizon Arena (5,819); North Little Rock, AR
2015 NCAA Women's Tournament
Mar 21, 2015*; 1:30 p.m., ESPN2	No. 6	Boise State; First Round	W 72–61	28–5	Thompson–Boling Arena (6,439); Knoxville, TN
Mar 23, 2015*; 6:30 p.m., ESPN2	No. 6	Pittsburgh; Second Round	W 77–67	29–5	Thompson–Boling Arena (5,712); Knoxville, TN
Mar 28, 2015*; 7:00 p.m., ESPN	No. 6	vs. Gonzaga; Sweet Sixteen	W 73–69 ^{OT}	30–5	Spokane Arena (8,686); Spokane, WA
Mar 30, 2015*; 9:00 p.m., ESPN	No. 6	vs. No. 4 Maryland; Elite Eight	L 48–58	30–6	Spokane Arena (5,064); Spokane, WA
*Non-conference game. ^{#}Rankings from AP Poll. (#) Tournament seedings in parentheses. All times are in Eastern Time.

== See also ==
- 2014–15 Tennessee Volunteers basketball team
