= Steffi Sorensen =

American basketball analyst and reporter

Steffi Sorensen is a college basketball analyst and sideline reporter for ESPN and the SEC Network. She played for the Florida Gators women's basketball team from 2008–2010.

== Early life and college ==
Steffi grew up in Jacksonville, Florida. She went to Bartram Trail High School where she was Miss Florida Basketball in her senior year in 2006 and she was the second-highest scorer in St. John's County with 2,147 points. She ended up going to Florida Gulf Coast University and was second in points averaging 14.5 points per game, leading the team to the Division II finals losing to Southern Connecticut State. Despite her successful freshman season and FGCU going to Division I, Sorensen transferred to Santa Fe Community College to be closer to family. After a year at SFCC, she walked-on at the University of Florida for the 2008–09 season under head coach Amanda Butler who recruited Sorensen while at the University of North Carolina at Charlotte. Sorensen earned a scholarship before her junior year ended. In her two years at Florida, she scored nine points per game and led the Lady Gators to the Second Round of the 2009 NCAA Division I women's basketball tournament. In her junior year, she set the school’s single-season 3-point percentage record, shooting 39.2 percent from beyond the arc. She was the captain and Most Valuable Player on the women’s basketball team her senior year. Sorensen graduated from the University of Florida with a bachelor of science degree in telecommunications management in 2010.

Her dad, Chris, along with his brother, Robin, were firefighters in Jacksonville and together founded Firehouse Subs.

== Broadcasting career ==
After being undrafted in the 2010 WNBA draft and playing a season in France, she joined ESPN 3 as an analyst before joining ESPN a year later as a color commentator, and is now a college basketball analyst for SEC Now and sideline reporter for SEC Network. She also worked for Fox Sports.
