= 2015 Big South Conference women's basketball tournament =

- Classification: Division I
- Season: 2014–15
- Teams: 11
- Site: HTC Center; Conway, South Carolina
- Champions: Liberty

The 2015 Big South women's basketball tournament was the postseason women's basketball tournament for the Big South Conference that took place March 3–8, 2015, at the HTC Center in Conway, South Carolina. All rounds after 1st were broadcast on ESPN3, 1st Round on Big South Network.

== Format ==
All 11 teams were eligible for the tournament.

== Seeds ==
Seed	School	Conference	Overall	Tiebreaker
1	Liberty ‡	19-1	26–6	
2	Radford	14-6	17-13	(2-0 vs Presbyterian)
3	High Point	14-6	20–12	(1-1 vs. Presbyterian)
4	Winthrop	13-7	17-13	(1-1 vs. Liberty)
5	Campbell	13-7	19-12	(0-2 vs. Liberty)
6	Presbyterian	10-10	16-15	
7	Gardner Webb	9-11	15-17	
8	UNC Asheville	7-13	9-22	
9	Coastal Carolina	6-14	12-18	
10	Longwood	4-16	4-26	
11	Charleston Southern	1-19	5-25	
‡ – Big South regular season champion. Overall records are as of the end of the regular season.

== Schedule ==
Session	Game	Time*	Matchup^{#}	Television	Score
First round - Monday, March 3
1	1	12:00 pm	#7 Gardner Webb vs. #10 Longwood	BSN	63-55
1	2	2:00 pm	#6 Presbyterian vs. #11 Charleston Southern	BSN	47-39
2	3	6:00 pm	#8 UNC Asheville vs. #9 Coastal Carolina	BSN	68-54
2	Quarterfinals - Thursday, March 5				
3	5	12:00 pm	#1 Liberty vs. #8 UNC Asheville	ESPN3	59-51
3	6	2:00 pm	#4 Winthrop vs. #5 Campbell	ESPN3	65-52
4	7	6:00 pm	#7 Gardner Webb vs. #2 Radford	ESPN3	70-56
4	8	8:00 pm	#3 High Point vs. #6 Presbyterian	ESPN3	75-62
Semifinals - Friday, March 7
5	9	6:00 pm	#1 Liberty vs. #5 Campbell	ESPN3	71-43
5	10	8:00 pm	#3 High Point vs. #7 Gardner Webb	ESPN3	56-53
Championship Game - Sunday, March 9
6	11	15:00 pm	#1 Liberty vs. #3 High Point	ESPN3	74-64

*Game times in Eastern Time. #Rankings denote tournament seeding.

== Bracket ==
First round March 3, 2014
8	UNC Asheville	68
9	Coastal Carolina	54
7	Gardner Webb	63
10	Longwood	55
6	Presbyterian	47
11	Charleston Southern	39

Quarterfinals; March 5, 2014; ESPN3
1	Liberty	59
8	UNC Asheville	51
4	Winthrop	52
5	Campbell	65
2	Radford	56
7	Gardner Webb	70
3	High Point	75
6	Presbyterian	62

Semifinals; March 7, 2014; ESPN3
1	Liberty	71
5	Campbell	43
7	Gardner Webb	53
3	High Point	56

Championship; March 8, 2014; ESPN3
1	Liberty	74
3	High Point	64
