= 2015 WAC women's basketball tournament =

2015 Western Athletic Conference women's basketball tournament
- Classification: Division I
- Season: 2014–15
- Teams: 7
- Site: Orleans Arena; Paradise, Nevada
- Champions: New Mexico State
- MVP: Brianna Freeman (New Mexico State)
- Attendance: 2,624
- Television: ESPNU; WAC Digital

2014–15 WAC women's basketball standings
	Conf.				Overall
Team	W		L	PCT	W		L	PCT
New Mexico State	13	–	1	.929	22	–	8	.733
Cal State Bakersfield	11	–	3	.786	23	–	9	.719
Texas-Pan American	9	–	5	.643	19	–	15	.559
Grand Canyon*	7	–	7	.500	13	–	14	.481
Seattle U	6	–	8	.429	10	–	21	.323
Utah Valley	5	–	9	.357	11	–	19	.367
UMKC	4	–	10	.286	6	–	24	.200
Chicago State	1	–	13	.071	4	–	25	.138
† 2015 WAC tournament winner As of 21 March 2015 (UTC) * Grand Canyon ineligible for WAC Basketball Tournament as part of reclassification from Division II; Rankings from AP poll

The 2015 WAC women's basketball tournament was held on March 11–14, 2015, at the Orleans Arena in Paradise, Nevada. This was the fourth consecutive year the WAC Tournament took place in Vegas.

== Format ==
Grand Canyon did not compete in the 2015 women's basketball tournament. As a D2 to D1 transitioning school, they were ineligible to compete in the NCAA tournament until the 2018 season, so they could not win the conference tournament since the winner received an automatic bid to the NCAA Tournament. However Grand Canyon was eligible to win the regular season title and is eligible to compete in the WNIT or WBI should they be invited.
Since Idaho left the WAC at the start of the year, 7 teams competed in the 2015 tournament in a traditional single-elimination style tournament. 1 had a bye in the first round 8, 2 played 7, 3 played 6, and 4 played 5 on Wednesday, March 11. The winners met in the semifinals on Friday, March 13. The championship was held on Saturday, March 14.

== Seeds ==
2014 WAC Women's Basketball Tournament seeds
Seed	School	Conference Record	Overall Record (End of Regular season)	Tiebreaker
1.	New Mexico State	13–1	20–7	
2.	Cal State Bakersfield	11–3	22–7	
3.	UT Pan American	9–5	17–13	
4.	Grand Canyon	7–7	13–14	Since Grand Canyon can't qualify for the WAC Tourney, teams 5–8 will be seeded 4–7.
5.	Seattle U	6–8	9–20	
6.	Utah Valley	5–9	11–18	
7.	UMKC	4–10	6–23	
8.	Chicago State	1–13	4–24	

== Schedule ==
Session	Game	Time*	Matchup^{#}
Quarterfinals – Wednesday, March 11
1	1	2:00 PM	#4 Seattle vs. #5 Utah Valley
1	2	4:30 PM	#2 Cal State Bakersfield vs. #7 Chicago State
2	3	7:00 PM	#3 UT Pan American vs. #6 UMKC
2	Semifinals – Friday, March 13		
3	4	12:00 PM	#1 New Mexico State vs. #4 Seattle
3	5	2:30 PM	#2 Cal State Bakersfield vs. #3 UT Pan American
Championship Game – Saturday, March 14
4	6	1:00 PM	#1 New Mexico State vs. #3 UT Pan American
*Game Times in PT. #-Rankings denote tournament seeding.

== Bracket ==
Quarterfinals; Wednesday, March 11
4	Seattle U	64
5	Utah Valley	62
2	Cal State Bakersfield	77
7	Chicago State	53
3	UT Pan American	61
6	UMKC	50

Semifinals; Friday, March 13
1	New Mexico State	79
4	Seattle U	75^{OT}
2	Cal State Bakersfield	70
3	UT Pan American	76

Championship; Saturday, March 14
1	New Mexico State	70
3	UT Pan American	52

== Game summaries ==
=== Seattle U vs. Utah Valley ===
Broadcasters: Mychal Clanton, Steven Hunter, & Evyn Murray

WAC Digital

Mar 11
2 p.m. PDT

Utah Valley Wolverines 62, Seattle U Redhawks 64
Scoring by half: 27–24, 35–40
Pts: Rhai Spooner-Knight 14; Rebs: Sam Loogins 11; Asts: Georgia Agnew 6	Pts: Taelor Ross 22; Rebs: Taelor Ross 14; Asts: Jazmine Johnson 6

Orleans Arena
Paradise, NV
Attendance: 657
Referees: Lisa Jones, Jack Jones, Brenda Pantoja

=== Cal State Bakersfield vs. Chicago State ===
Broadcasters: Mychal Clanton, Steven Hunter, & Evyn Murray

WAC Digital

Mar 11
4:30 p.m. PDT

Chicago State Cougars 53, Cal State Bakersfield Roadrunners 77
Scoring by half: 23–40, 30–37
Pts: Paris Williams 21; Rebs: Layne Murphy 10; Asts: Sarah Amalou 3	Pts: Tyonna Outland 17; Rebs: Batabe Zempare 10; Asts: Tyonna Outland 6

Orleans Arena
Paradise, NV
Attendance: 657
Referees: Penny Davis, Carla Fujimoto, Peter Contreras

=== UT Pan American vs. UMKC ===
Broadcasters: Mychal Clanton, Steven Hunter, & Evyn Murray

WAC Digital

Mar 11
8 p.m. PDT

UMKC Kangaroos 50, UT Pan American Broncs 61
Scoring by half: 27–26, 23–35
Pts: Calli White 12; Rebs: Kiana Law 8 Asts: Sierra Bone 3	Pts: Shawnte' Goff & Brittany Bush 17; Rebs: Brittany Bush 7 Asts: T'Ondria Nolen 4

Orleans Arena
Paradise, NV
Attendance: 657
Referees: Melissa Barlow, Kent Johnson, Julie Krommenhoek

=== New Mexico State vs. Seattle U ===
Broadcasters: Mychal Clanton, Steven Hunter, & Evyn Murray

WAC Digital

Mar 13
12 p.m. PDT

Seattle Redhawks 75, New Mexico State Aggies 79 (OT)
Scoring by half: 35–30, 32–37 Overtime: 8–12
Pts: Crystal Allen & Taelor Ross 21; Rebs: Taelor Ross 17; Asts: Kaylee Best 6	Pts: Sasha Weber 22; Rebs: Brianna Freeman 16; Asts: Shanice Davis 5

Orleans Arena
Paradise, NV
Attendance:
Referees: Julie Krommenhoek, Kent Johnson, Peter Contreras

=== Cal State Bakersfield vs. UT Pan American ===
Broadcasters: Mychal Clanton, Steven Hunter, & Evyn Murray

WAC Digital

Mar 13
2:30 p.m. PDT

UT Pan American Broncs 76, Cal State Bakersfield Roadrunners 70
Scoring by half: 43–41, 33–29
Pts: Shawnte' Goff 14; Rebs: Shawnte' Goff 11; Asts: Rickell Preston 6	Pts: Tyonna Outland 24; Rebs: Tyonna Outland 12; Asts: Tyonna Outland 5

Orleans Arena
Paradise, NV
Attendance:
Referees: Brenda Pantoja, Jack Jones, Ify Seales

=== Championship: New Mexico State vs. UT Pan American ===
Broadcasters: Steve Quis & Katie Smith

ESPNU

Mar 14
1 p.m. PDT

UT Pan American Broncs 52, New Mexico State Aggies 70
Scoring by half: 27–25, 46–24
Pts: Cha'zaye Wright 15; Rebs: Bush; Wright 8 Asts: Preston; Wright 2	Pts: Sasha Weber 20; Rebs: Freeman; Mack 9 Asts: Moriah Mack 4

Orleans Arena
Paradise, NV
Attendance: 888
Referees: Melissa Barlow; Lisa Jones; Julie Krommenhoek

== Awards and honors ==
Tournament MVP: Brianna Freeman – New Mexico State

All-Tournament teams:

- Brianna Freeman – New Mexico State
- Shawnte' Goff – Texas–Pan American
- Tyonna Outland – CSU–Bakersfield
- Taelor Ross – Seattle
- Sasha Weber – New Mexico State
