= 2014–15 NC State Wolfpack women's basketball team =

Intercollegiate basketball season

2014–15 NC State Wolfpack women's basketball

WNIT, Third Round
- Conference: Atlantic Coast Conference
- Record: 18–15 (7–9 ACC)
- Head coach: Wes Moore (2nd season)
- Assistant coaches: Nikki West; Gene Hill; Lindsay Edmonds
- Home arena: Reynolds Coliseum

2014–15 ACC women's basketball standings
	Conf.				Overall
Team	W		L	PCT	W		L	PCT
No. 2 Notre Dame^{†}	15	–	1	.938	36	–	3	.923
No. 7 Florida State	14	–	2	.875	32	–	5	.865
No. 8 Louisville	12	–	4	.750	27	–	7	.794
No. 16 Duke	11	–	5	.688	23	–	11	.676
Syracuse	11	–	5	.688	22	–	10	.688
No. 15 North Carolina	10	–	6	.625	26	–	9	.743
Pittsburgh	9	–	7	.563	20	–	12	.625
Miami (FL)	8	–	8	.500	20	–	13	.606
Virginia	7	–	9	.438	17	–	14	.548
NC State	7	–	9	.438	18	–	15	.545
Georgia Tech	7	–	9	.438	19	–	15	.559
Boston College	5	–	11	.313	13	–	17	.433
Wake Forest	2	–	14	.125	13	–	20	.394
Virginia Tech	1	–	15	.063	12	–	20	.375
Clemson	1	–	15	.063	9	–	21	.300
† 2015 ACC tournament winner As of 7 April 2015; Rankings from AP poll

The 2014–15 NC State Wolfpack women's basketball team represented North Carolina State University during the 2014–15 NCAA Division I women's basketball season. The Wolfpack, led by second-year head coach Wes Moore, played their home games at Reynolds Coliseum and were members of the Atlantic Coast Conference. They finished the season 18–15, 7–9 in ACC play to finish in a three way tie for ninth place. They lost in the first round of the ACC women's tournament to Virginia Tech. They were invited to the Women's National Invitation Tournament, where they defeated East Tennessee State in the first round and East Carolina in the second round, before falling to Temple in the third round.

== Roster ==
2014–15 NC State Wolfpack women's basketball team
Players
Coaches

Pos.	#	Name	Height	Year	Previous school	Hometown
G	2	Len'Nique Brown-Hoskin	5 ft 5 in (1.65 m)	RS Sr	Karen Wagner	San Antonio, TX
G	3	Miah Spencer	5 ft 8 in (1.73 m)	So	Columbia	Decatur, GA
G	4	Ashley Williams	5 ft 8 in (1.73 m)	RS So	Green Hope	Cary, NC
F	5	Chelsea Nelson	6 ft 1 in (1.85 m)	Fr	John Overton	Antioch, TN
G/F	10	Ashley Eli	5 ft 11 in (1.8 m)	Jr	Summit	Mansfield, TX
F	11	Jennifer Mathurin	6 ft 1 in (1.85 m)	So	Champlain College State Lambert	Montreal, Quebec
F	12	Krystal Barrett	5 ft 9 in (1.75 m)	Sr	Skyline	Dallas, TX
C	15	Sara Boric	6 ft 5 in (1.96 m)	Fr	Tehnicka Skola	Banja Luka, Bosnia
G	22	Dominique Wilson	5 ft 8 in (1.73 m)	Jr	McEachern	Powder Springs, GA
G	23	Chloe Jackson	5 ft 9 in (1.75 m)	Fr	Riverdale Baptist	Upper Marlboro, MD
F/C	25	Carlee Schuhmacher	6 ft 1 in (1.85 m)	Jr	Des Moines Area CC	Watertown, WI
G	30	Kaley Moser	5 ft 11 in (1.8 m)	Jr	Williams	Burlington, NC
C	32	Akela Maize	6 ft 5 in (1.96 m)	Fr	New Hope Christian Academy	Greensboro, NC

Head coach

- Wes Moore (NC State)

Assistant coach(es)

- Nikki West (Clemson)
- Gene Hill (Georgia Tech)
- Lindsay Edmonds (Appalachian State)

Legend

- (C) Team captain
- (S) Suspended
- (I) Ineligible
- (W) Walk-on
- Injured
- Current redshirt

Roster
Last update: 2014-07-04

== Media ==
WKNC acts as the home for Wolfpack women's basketball. Patrick Kinas and Rachel Stockdale provide the call for the games. ESPN and the ACC RSN televise select Wolfpack games during the season. All non-televised home conference games are shown on ESPN3 using the radio broadcasters for the call.

== Schedule ==
Date time, TV	Rank^{#}	Opponent^{#}	Result	Record	Site (attendance) city, state
Exhibition
11/07/2014*; 6:30 pm		Lenoir–Rhyne	W 70–52	–	Reynolds Coliseum (1,073); Raleigh, NC
Non-conference regular season
11/14/2014*; 7:00 pm		Tennessee State	W 84–55	1–0	Reynolds Coliseum (1,337); Raleigh, NC
11/16/2014*; 2:00 pm		Coppin State	W 81–61	2–0	Reynolds Coliseum (1,554); Raleigh, NC
11/18/2014*; 7:00 pm		at Charlotte	W 70–63	3–0	Dale F. Halton Arena (1,592); Charlotte, NC
11/21/2014*; 7:00 pm		High Point	W 66–62	4–0	Reynolds Coliseum (1,672); Raleigh, NC
11/24/2014*; 8:00 pm		at Tulane	L 51–60	4–1	Devlin Fieldhouse (648); New Orleans, LA
11/28/2014*; 1:00 pm		vs. George Washington; Junkanoo Jam Freeport Division	L 66–74	4–2	St. Georges High School (N/A); Grand Bahama Island
11/29/2014*; 1:00 pm		vs. Texas Tech; Junkanoo Jam Freeport Division	W 75–42	5–2	St. Georges High School (247); Grand Bahama Island
12/03/2014*; 7:00 pm, ESPN3		Minnesota; ACC–Big Ten Women's Challenge	L 55–60	5–3	Reynolds Coliseum (1,535); Raleigh, NC
12/07/2014*; 2:00 pm		Elon	W 84–51	6–3	Reynolds Coliseum (1,615); Raleigh, NC
12/13/2014*; 7:00 pm		Mount St. Mary's	W 85–60	7–3	Reynolds Coliseum (1,397); Raleigh, NC
12/17/2014*; 12:00 pm		Liberty	W 67–64	8–3	Reynolds Coliseum (937); Raleigh, NC
12/19/2014*; 7:00 pm		Davidson	W 82–66	9–3	Reynolds Coliseum (1,275); Raleigh, NC
12/30/2014*; 7:00 pm		at Villanova	L 65–74	9–4	The Pavilion (609); Villanova, PA
ACC regular season
01/04/2015; 3:00 pm, RSN		at No. 9 North Carolina; Carolina–State Game	L 56–72	9–5 (0–1)	Carmichael Arena (5,421); Chapel Hill, NC
01/08/2015; 7:00 pm		Virginia Tech	W 73–59	10–5 (1–1)	Reynolds Coliseum (1,394); Raleigh, NC
01/10/2015; 2:00 pm		Clemson	W 76–50	11–5 (2–1)	Reynolds Coliseum (2,476); Raleigh, NC
01/14/2015; 7:00 pm		at No. 4 Louisville	L 58–65	11–6 (2–2)	KFC Yum! Center (7,736); Louisville, KY
01/18/2015; 2:00 pm		at Wake Forest	W 78–70	12–6 (3–2)	LJVM Coliseum (1,240); Winston-Salem, NC
01/22/2015; 7:00 pm, ESPN3		No. 12 North Carolina; Carolina–State Game	L 63–67	12–7 (3–3)	Reynolds Coliseum (2,736); Raleigh, NC
01/25/2015; 3:30 pm, RSN		at No. 23 Syracuse	L 49–66	12–8 (3–4)	Carrier Dome (1,300); Syracuse, NY
01/29/2015; 7:00 pm		at Virginia	L 63–71	12–9 (3–5)	John Paul Jones Arena (3,092); Charlottesville, VA
02/05/2015; 7:00 pm		Pittsburgh	L 50–60	12–10 (3–6)	Reynolds Coliseum (1,719); Raleigh, NC
02/08/2015; 2:00 pm		Wake Forest	W 71–55	13–10 (4–6)	Reynolds Coliseum (3,119); Raleigh, NC
02/12/2015; 7:00 pm		at Georgia Tech	W 65–64	14–10 (5–6)	McCamish Pavilion (613); Atlanta, GA
02/16/2015; 5:30 pm		at Boston College; Postponed from 2/15	L 59–64 ^{OT}	14–11 (5–7)	Conte Forum (527); Chestnut Hill, MA
02/19/2015; 7:00 pm		Miami (FL)	W 68–65	15–11 (6–7)	Reynolds Coliseum (1,570); Raleigh, NC
02/22/2015; 12:00 pm, ESPN2		No. 10 Duke	W 72–59	16–11 (7–7)	Reynolds Coliseum (4,896); Raleigh, NC
02/26/2015; 7:00 pm, ESPN3		at No. 9 Florida State	L 52–72	16–12 (7–8)	Donald L. Tucker Civic Center (4,048); Tallahassee, FL
03/01/2015; 2:00 pm, ESPN3		No. 4 Notre Dame	L 60–67	16–13 (7–9)	Reynolds Coliseum (2,649); Raleigh, NC
ACC Women's Tournament
03/04/2015; 3:30 pm, RSN		vs. Virginia Tech; First Round	L 56–57	16–14	Greensboro Coliseum (3,917); Greensboro, NC
WNIT
03/19/2015*; 7:00 pm		at East Tennessee State; First Round	W 73–58	17–14	J. Madison Brooks Gymnasium (1,471); Johnson City, TN
03/22/2015*; 4:00 pm		at East Carolina; Second Round	W 69–65	18–14	Williams Arena at Minges Coliseum (2,160); Greenville, NC
03/26/2015*; 7:00 pm		at Temple; Third Round	L 79–80 ^{OT}	18–15	McGonigle Hall (438); Philadelphia, PA
*Non-conference game. ^{#}Rankings from AP Poll. (#) Tournament seedings in parentheses. All times are in Eastern.

== Rankings ==
- 2014–15 NCAA Division I women's basketball rankings

Regular season polls
Poll	Pre- season	Week 2	Week 3	Week 4	Week 5	Week 6	Week 7	Week 8	Week 9	Week 10	Week 11	Week 12	Week 13	Week 14	Week 15	Week 16	Week 17	Week 18	Final
AP	RV	RV	RV	NR	NR	NR	NR	NR	NR	NR	NR	NR	NR	NR	NR	RV	NR	NR	NR
Coaches	RV	RV	RV	NR	NR	NR	NR	NR	NR	NR	NR	NR	NR	NR	NR	NR	NR	NR	NR

Legend
	Increase in ranking
	Decrease in ranking
	No change
(RV)	Received votes
(NR)	Not ranked

== See also ==
- NC State Wolfpack women's basketball
- 2014–15 NC State Wolfpack men's basketball team
