= 2015 ACC women's basketball tournament =

- Classification: Division I
- Season: 2014–15
- Teams: 15
- Site: Greensboro Coliseum; Greensboro, North Carolina
- Champions: Notre Dame (2nd title)
- Winning coach: Muffet McGraw (2nd title)
- MVP: Jewell Loyd (Notre Dame)
- Attendance: 106,045
- Television: ESPN, ESPNU, ACCRSN

2014–15 ACC women's basketball standings
	Conf.				Overall
Team	W		L	PCT	W		L	PCT
No. 2 Notre Dame^{†}	15	–	1	.938	36	–	3	.923
No. 7 Florida State	14	–	2	.875	32	–	5	.865
No. 8 Louisville	12	–	4	.750	27	–	7	.794
No. 16 Duke	11	–	5	.688	23	–	11	.676
Syracuse	11	–	5	.688	22	–	10	.688
No. 15 North Carolina	10	–	6	.625	26	–	9	.743
Pittsburgh	9	–	7	.563	20	–	12	.625
Miami (FL)	8	–	8	.500	20	–	13	.606
Virginia	7	–	9	.438	17	–	14	.548
NC State	7	–	9	.438	18	–	15	.545
Georgia Tech	7	–	9	.438	19	–	15	.559
Boston College	5	–	11	.313	13	–	17	.433
Wake Forest	2	–	14	.125	13	–	20	.394
Virginia Tech	1	–	15	.063	12	–	20	.375
Clemson	1	–	15	.063	9	–	21	.300
† 2015 ACC tournament winner As of 7 April 2015; Rankings from AP poll

The 2015 Atlantic Coast Conference women's basketball tournament was the postseason women's basketball tournament for the Atlantic Coast Conference held March 4–8, 2015, in Greensboro, North Carolina, at the Greensboro Coliseum. The tournament was won by Notre Dame, who defeated Florida State in the championship game.

== Seeding ==
Tournament seeds are determined by teams' regular season conference record with tiebreakers determined by ACC tiebreaking rules.

2014 ACC women's basketball tournament seeds and results
Seed	School	Conf.	Over.	Tiebreaker
1	Notre Dame^{†‡}	15–1	28–2	
2	Florida State^{†}	14–2	27–3	
3	Louisville^{†}	12–4	24–5	
4	Duke^{†}	11–5	20–9	1–0 vs. Syracuse
5	Syracuse^{#}	11–5	21–8	0–1 vs. Duke
6	North Carolina^{#}	10–6	23–7	
7	Pittsburgh^{#}	9–7	19–10	
8	Miami (FL)^{#}	8–8	18–11	
9	Virginia^{#}	7–9	17–12	1–0 Georgia Tech, 0–1 NC State
10	NC State	7–9	16–13	1–0 Virginia, 0–1 Georgia Tech
11	Georgia Tech	7–9	17–13	1–0 NC State, 0–1 Virginia
12	Boston College	5–11	11–16	
13	Wake Forest	2–14	11–19	
14	Clemson	1–15	9–20	1–0 vs. Virginia Tech
15	Virginia Tech	1–15	10–19	0–1 vs. Clemson
‡ – ACC regular season champions, and tournament No. 1 seed. † – Received a double-bye in the conference tournament. # – Received a single-bye in the conference tournament. Overall records include all games played in the ACC Tournament.

== Schedule ==
Session	Game	Time*	Matchup^{#}	Television	Attendance
First round – Wednesday, March 4
Opening day	1	1:00 pm	#12 Boston College vs #13 Wake Forest	ACCRSN	3,917
Opening day	2	3:30 pm	#10 NC State vs #15 Virginia Tech	ACCRSN	3,917
Opening day	3	6:30 pm	#11 Georgia Tech vs #14 Clemson	ACCRSN	3,573
Second round – Thursday, March 5
1	4	11:00 am	#5 Syracuse vs #13 Wake Forest	ACCRSN	9,386
1	5	2:00 pm	#8 Miami vs #9 Virginia	ACCRSN	9,386
2	6	6:00 pm	#7 Pittsburgh vs #15 Virginia Tech	ACCRSN	5,359
2	7	8:00 pm	#6 North Carolina vs #11 Georgia Tech	ACCRSN	5,359
Quarterfinals – Friday, March 6
3	8	11:00 am	#4 Duke vs #13 Wake Forest	ACCRSN	11,007
3	9	2:00 pm	#1 Notre Dame vs #8 Miami	ACCRSN	11,007
4	10	6:00 pm	#2 Florida State vs #15 Virginia Tech	ACCRSN	5,848
4	11	8:00 pm	#3 Louisville vs #6 North Carolina	ACCRSN	5,848
Semifinals – Saturday, March 7
5	12	12:00 pm	#1 Notre Dame vs #4 Duke	ESPNU	7,108
5	13	2:30 pm	#2 Florida State vs #3 Louisville	ESPNU	7,108
Championship Game – Sunday, March 8
6	14	1:00 pm	#1 Notre Dame vs #2 Florida State	ESPN	6,874
*Game Times in ET. #-Rankings denote tournament seed

== Bracket ==
First round Wednesday, March 4 ACCRSN
12	Boston College	53
13	Wake Forest	69
10	NC State	56
15	Virginia Tech	57
11	Georgia Tech	80
14	Clemson	53

Second round Thursday, March 5 ACCRSN
8	Miami	62
9	Virginia	52
5	#22 Syracuse	79
13	Wake Forest	85
7	Pittsburgh	45
15	Virginia Tech	51
6	#15 North Carolina	84
11	Georgia Tech	64

Quarterfinals; Friday, March 6 ACCRSN
1	#2 Notre Dame	77
8	Miami	61
4	#16 Duke	77
13	Wake Forest	68
2	#7 Florida State	82
15	Virginia Tech	43
3	#10 Louisville	77^{OT}
6	#15 North Carolina	75

Semifinals; Saturday, March 7 ESPNU
1	#2 Notre Dame	55
4	#16 Duke	49
2	#7 Florida State	66
3	#10 Louisville	51

Championship game Sunday, March 8 ESPN
1	#2 Notre Dame	71
2	#7 Florida State	58

== Awards and honors ==
Tournament MVP: Jewell Loyd – Notre Dame

All-Tournament teams:

First Team
- Jewell Loyd – Notre Dame
- Brianna Turner – Notre Dame
- Elizabeth Williams – Duke
- Dearica Hamby – Wake Forest
- Shakayla Thomas – Florida State

Second Team

- Madison Cable – Notre Dame
- Taya Reimer – Notre Dame
- Stephanie Mavunga – North Carolina
- Vanessa Panousis – Virginia Tech
- Leticia Romero – Florida State

== See also ==
- 2015 ACC men's basketball tournament
