= 2014–15 Georgia Tech Yellow Jackets women's basketball team =

Intercollegiate basketball season

2014–15 Georgia Tech Yellow Jackets women's basketball

Georgia Tech Holiday Tournament Champions

WNIT, Second Round
- Conference: Atlantic Coast Conference
- Record: 19–15 (7–9 ACC)
- Head coach: MaChelle Joseph
- Assistant coaches: Deja Foster; Michael Wholey; M.L. Willis
- Home arena: McCamish Pavilion

2014–15 ACC women's basketball standings
	Conf.				Overall
Team	W		L	PCT	W		L	PCT
No. 2 Notre Dame^{†}	15	–	1	.938	36	–	3	.923
No. 7 Florida State	14	–	2	.875	32	–	5	.865
No. 8 Louisville	12	–	4	.750	27	–	7	.794
No. 16 Duke	11	–	5	.688	23	–	11	.676
Syracuse	11	–	5	.688	22	–	10	.688
No. 15 North Carolina	10	–	6	.625	26	–	9	.743
Pittsburgh	9	–	7	.563	20	–	12	.625
Miami (FL)	8	–	8	.500	20	–	13	.606
Virginia	7	–	9	.438	17	–	14	.548
NC State	7	–	9	.438	18	–	15	.545
Georgia Tech	7	–	9	.438	19	–	15	.559
Boston College	5	–	11	.313	13	–	17	.433
Wake Forest	2	–	14	.125	13	–	20	.394
Virginia Tech	1	–	15	.063	12	–	20	.375
Clemson	1	–	15	.063	9	–	21	.300
† 2015 ACC tournament winner As of 7 April 2015; Rankings from AP poll

The 2014–15 Georgia Tech Yellow Jackets women's basketball team represented Georgia Institute of Technology during the 2014–15 NCAA Division I women's basketball season. Returning as head coach was MaChelle Joseph entering her 12th season. The team played its home games at the McCamish Pavilion in Atlanta, Georgia as members of the Atlantic Coast Conference. They finished the season 19–15, 7–9 in ACC play to finish in a three way tie for ninth place. They advanced to the second round of the ACC women's tournament where they lost to North Carolina. They were invited to the Women's National Invitation Tournament, where they defeated Elon before losing to Ole Miss in the second round.

== 2014–15 media ==
All Yellow Jackets games will air on the Yellow Jackets IMG Sports Network. WREK once again serves as the home of the Ramblin Wreck women's basketball team.

== 2014–15 Roster ==
2014–15 Georgia Tech Yellow Jackets women's basketball team
Players
Coaches

Pos.	#	Name	Height	Year	Previous school	Hometown
G	0	Imani Tilford	5 ft 5 in (1.65 m)	Fr	Woodlands High School	Greenburgh, N.Y.
G/F	2	Aaliyah Whiteside	6 ft 0 in (1.83 m)	Jr	Memphis Central	Memphis, Tenn.
G	3	Kaela Davis	6 ft 2 in (1.88 m)	So	Buford HS	Suwanee, Ga.
F	10	Katarina Vuckovic	6 ft 3 in (1.91 m)	So	Crvena Zvezda	Smederevo, Serbia
C	11	Nariah Taylor	6 ft 5 in (1.96 m)	Jr	North Central	Indianapolis, Ind.
F	13	Erin Garner	6 ft 3 in (1.91 m)	Fr	Trenton Catholic Academy	Philadelphia, Pa.
C	14	Simina Avram	6 ft 3 in (1.91 m)	Fr	Andre Saguna	Brasov, Romania
F	21	Zaire O'Neil	5 ft 11 in (1.8 m)	Fr	Malcolm X Shabazz	Newark, N.J.
G	23	Sydney Wallace	5 ft 8 in (1.73 m)	Sr	Northview High School	Johns Creek, Ga.
F	24	De'Ashia Jones	5 ft 10 in (1.78 m)	Fr	Malcolm X Shabazz	Newark, N.J.
F	54	Roddreka Rogers	6 ft 0 in (1.83 m)	Jr	Myers Park	Charlotte, N.C.
G	55	Antonia Peresson	5 ft 9 in (1.75 m)	Fr	Liceo Stefanini Yenezia	Pordenone, Italy

Head coach

MaChelle Joseph

Assistant coach(es)

M.L. Willis
Michael Wholey
Deja Foster

Legend

- (C) Team captain
- (S) Suspended
- (I) Ineligible
- (W) Walk-on
- Injured
- Current redshirt

Roster
Last update: 2014-09-13

== Schedule ==
Date time, TV	Rank^{#}	Opponent^{#}	Result	Record	Site (attendance) city, state
Exhibition
11/02/2014*; 2:00 pm		Flagler	W 102–44	–	McCamish Pavilion (614); Atlanta, GA
Regular Season
11/14/2014*; 6:00 pm		at Loyola–Chicago	W 92–57	1–0	Joseph J. Gentile Arena (N/A); Chicago, IL
11/16/2014*; 2:00 pm		Morgan State	W 105–76	2–0	McCamish Pavilion (875); Atlanta, GA
11/19/2014*; 7:00 pm		Kennesaw State	W 77–48	3–0	McCamish Pavilion (593); Atlanta, GA
11/23/2014*; 2:00 pm, ESPN3		No. 24 Georgia	L 57–64	3–1	McCamish Pavilion (2,468); Atlanta, GA
11/25/2014*; 7:00 pm		Grambling State	W 97–64	4–1	McCamish Pavilion (522); Atlanta, GA
11/28/2014*; 12:00 pm		vs. Green Bay; Gulf Coast Showcase Quarterfinals	L 50–71	4–2	Germain Arena (N/A); Estero, FL
11/29/2014*; 12:00 pm		vs. Villanova; Gulf Coast Showcase consolation 2nd round	W 71–63	5–2	Germain Arena (N/A); Estero, FL
11/30/2014*; 2:30 pm		vs. Minnesota; Gulf Coast Showcase 5th place game	L 69–72	5–3	Germain Arena (N/A); Estero, FL
12/04/2014*; 7:00 pm		at No. 16 Michigan State; ACC–Big Ten Women's Challenge	L 73–79 ^{OT}	5–4	Breslin Center (6,636); East Lansing, MI
12/14/2014*; 4:00 pm		Central Arkansas	W 88–50	6–4	McCamish Pavilion (N/A); Atlanta, GA
12/17/2014*; 4:00 pm		Alabama State	W 77–53	7–4	McCamish Pavilion (432); Atlanta, GA
12/20/2014*; 12:00 pm		at Saint Francis Brooklyn	W 65–59	8–4	Generoso Pope Athletic Complex (415); Brooklyn, NY
12/29/2014*; 4:00 pm		Lipscomb; Georgia Tech Holiday Tournament semifinals	W 71–53	9–4	McCamish Pavilion (767); Atlanta, GA
12/30/2014*; 4:00 pm		Louisiana Tech; Georgia Tech Holiday Tournament championship	W 96–81	10–4	McCamish Pavilion (656); Atlanta, GA
01/02/2015; 7:00 pm		at No. 7 Louisville	L 48–75	10–5 (0–1)	KFC Yum! Center (9,049); Louisville, KY
01/04/2015; 2:00 pm		Clemson	W 74–66	11–5 (1–1)	McCamish Pavilion (1,267); Atlanta, GA
01/08/2015; 7:00 pm		at Boston College	W 80–77	12–5 (2–1)	Conte Forum (479); Chestnut Hill, MA
01/11/2015; 3:00 pm, RSN		at No. 8 North Carolina	L 81–96	12–6 (2–2)	Carmichael Arena (3,129); Chapel Hill, NC
01/18/2015; 2:00 pm		Pittsburgh	L 72–75 ^{OT}	12–7 (2–3)	McCamish Pavilion (1,548); Atlanta, GA
01/22/2015; 7:00 pm, ESPN3		at No. 6 Notre Dame	L 76–89	12–8 (2–4)	Edmund P. Joyce Center (8,865); South Bend, IN
01/25/2015; 2:00 pm		at Virginia	W 68–62	13–8 (3–4)	John Paul Jones Arena (3,975); Charlottesville, VA
01/30/2015; 7:00 pm, RSN		No. 9 Florida State	L 62–82	13–9 (3–5)	McCamish Pavilion (1,166); Atlanta, GA
02/01/2015; 2:00 pm, ESPN3		Virginia Tech	W 79–71	14–9 (4–5)	McCamish Pavilion (1,072); Atlanta, GA
02/08/2015; 2:00 pm		No. 25 Syracuse	L 60–65	14–10 (4–6)	McCamish Pavilion (1,622); Atlanta, GA
02/12/2015; 7:00 pm, ESPN3		NC State	L 64–65	14–11 (4–7)	McCamish Pavilion (613); Atlanta, GA
02/15/2015; 3:00 pm, RSN		at Miami (FL)	L 59–64	14–12 (4–8)	BankUnited Center (1,442); Coral Gables, FL
02/19/2015; 7:00 pm, RSN		No. 4 Notre Dame	L 61–71	14–13 (4–9)	McCamish Pavilion (2,303); Atlanta, GA
02/22/2015; 2:00 pm		at Clemson	W 71–59	15–13 (5–9)	Littlejohn Coliseum (739); Clemson, SC
02/26/2015; 7:00 pm, ESPN3		No. 16 Duke	W 71–62	16–13 (6–9)	McCamish Pavilion (1,153); Atlanta, GA
02/28/2015; 2:00 pm		at Wake Forest	W 67–60	17–13 (7–9)	LJVM Coliseum (1,085); Winston-Salem, NC
2015 ACC Tournament
03/04/2015; 6:30 pm, RSN		vs. Clemson; First Round	W 80–53	18–13	Greensboro Coliseum (3,573); Greensboro, NC
03/05/2015; 8:00 pm, RSN		vs. No. 15 North Carolina; Second Round	L 64–84	18–14	Greensboro Coliseum (5,359); Greensboro, NC
WNIT
03/19/2015*; 7:05 pm		Elon; First Round	W 69–47	19–14	McCamish Pavilion (421); Atlanta, GA
03/22/2015*; 7:00 pm		at Ole Miss; Second Round	L 48–63	19–15	Tad Smith Coliseum (1,075); Oxford, MS
*Non-conference game. ^{#}Rankings from AP Poll,. (#) Tournament seedings in parentheses. All times are in Eastern Time.

== Rankings ==
2014–15 NCAA Division I women's basketball rankings

Regular season polls
Poll	Pre- Season	Week 2	Week 3	Week 4	Week 5	Week 6	Week 7	Week 8	Week 9	Week 10	Week 11	Week 12	Week 13	Week 14	Week 15	Week 16	Week 17	Week 18	Final
AP	NR	NR	NR	NR	NR	NR	NR	NR	NR	NR	NR	NR	NR	NR	NR	NR	NR	NR	NR
Coaches	NR	NR	NR	NR	NR	NR	NR	NR	NR	NR	NR	NR	NR	NR	NR	NR	NR	NR	NR

Legend
	Increase in ranking
	Decrease in ranking
	No change
(RV)	Received votes
(NR)	Not ranked
