= 2014–15 Virginia Cavaliers women's basketball team =

Intercollegiate basketball season

2014–15 Virginia Cavaliers women's basketball

WNIT, First Round
- Conference: Atlantic Coast Conference
- Record: 17–14 (7–9 ACC)
- Head coach: Joanne Boyle (4th season)
- Assistant coaches: Kim McNeill (4th season); La'Keshia Frett Meredith (2nd season); Cory McNeill (4th season)
- Home arena: John Paul Jones Arena

2014–15 ACC women's basketball standings
	Conf.				Overall
Team	W		L	PCT	W		L	PCT
No. 2 Notre Dame^{†}	15	–	1	.938	36	–	3	.923
No. 7 Florida State	14	–	2	.875	32	–	5	.865
No. 8 Louisville	12	–	4	.750	27	–	7	.794
No. 16 Duke	11	–	5	.688	23	–	11	.676
Syracuse	11	–	5	.688	22	–	10	.688
No. 15 North Carolina	10	–	6	.625	26	–	9	.743
Pittsburgh	9	–	7	.563	20	–	12	.625
Miami (FL)	8	–	8	.500	20	–	13	.606
Virginia	7	–	9	.438	17	–	14	.548
NC State	7	–	9	.438	18	–	15	.545
Georgia Tech	7	–	9	.438	19	–	15	.559
Boston College	5	–	11	.313	13	–	17	.433
Wake Forest	2	–	14	.125	13	–	20	.394
Virginia Tech	1	–	15	.063	12	–	20	.375
Clemson	1	–	15	.063	9	–	21	.300
† 2015 ACC tournament winner As of 7 April 2015; Rankings from AP poll

The 2014–15 Virginia Cavaliers women's basketball team represented the University of Virginia during the 2014–15 college basketball season. Joanne Boyle resumed the responsibility as head coach for a fourth consecutive season. The Cavaliers were members of the Atlantic Coast Conference, and played their home games at the John Paul Jones Arena. They finished the season 17–14, 7–9 in ACC play to finish in a three-way tie for ninth place. They lost in the second round of the ACC women's tournament to Miami (FL). They were invited to the Women's National Invitation Tournament, where they lost in the first round to Old Dominion.

== 2014–15 media ==
=== Virginia Cavaliers Sports Network ===
The Virginia Cavaliers Sports Network will broadcast select Cavaliers games on WINA. John Freeman, Larry Johnson, and Myron Ripley will provide the call for the games. Games not broadcast on WINA can be listened to online through Cavaliers Live at virginiasports.com.

== Roster ==
2014–15 Virginia Cavaliers women's basketball team
Players
Coaches

Pos.	#	Name	Height	Year	Previous school	Hometown
G	1	Mikayla Venson	5 ft 7 in (1.7 m)	Fr	Yorktown	Arlington, VA
F	2	Jae'Lisa Allen	6 ft 2 in (1.88 m)	Fr	White Hall	Pine Bluff, AR
F	3	Sarah Beth Barnett	6 ft 2 in (1.88 m)	Sr	Lexington Christian Academy	Lexington, KY
G	12	Breyana Mason	5 ft 8 in (1.73 m)	So	Forest Park	Woodbridge, VA
G	13	Tiffany Suarez	5 ft 11 in (1.8 m)	So	Our Lady of Lourdes	Miami, FL
G	15	Jaryn Garner	5 ft 7 in (1.7 m)	Jr	Germantown Academy	Sewell, NJ
G	20	Faith Randolph	5 ft 10 in (1.78 m)	Jr	Our Lady of Good Counsel	Derwood, MD
F	21	Lauren Moses	6 ft 2 in (1.88 m)	Fr	Rancocas	Mt. Holly, NJ
G	23	Aliyah Huland El	6 ft 1 in (1.85 m)	Fr	Randolph	Randolph, NJ
C	42	Sarah Imovbioh	6 ft 2 in (1.88 m)	Sr	St. Anne's-Belfield	Abuja, Nigeria
F	44	Sydney Umeri	6 ft 1 in (1.85 m)	So	The Lovett School	Acworth, GA

Head coach

- Joanne Boyle (Duke)

Assistant coach(es)

- Kim McNeill (Richmond)
- La'Keisha Frett Meredith (Georgia)
- Cory McNeill (Morgan State)

Legend

- (C) Team captain
- (S) Suspended
- (I) Ineligible
- (W) Walk-on
- Injured
- Current redshirt

Roster
Last update: 2014-07-05

== Schedule ==
Date time, TV	Rank^{#}	Opponent^{#}	Result	Record	Site (attendance) city, state
Non-conference regular season
November 14*; 7:00 pm		Ohio State	W 87–82	1–0	John Paul Jones Arena (3,358); Charlottesville, VA
November 16*; 1:00 pm		Radford	W 75–47	2–0	John Paul Jones Arena (3,172); Charlottesville, VA
November 20*; 7:00 pm		at Xavier	W 71–62	3–0	Cintas Center (714); Cincinnati, OH
November 23*; 2:00 pm		Auburn	W 66–51	4–0	John Paul Jones Arena (3,526); Charlottesville, VA
November 28*; 8:00 pm		vs. Toledo; Florida International Tournament	L 62–64	4–1	FIU Arena (436); Miami, FL
November 30*; 2:00 pm		at FIU; Florida International Tournament	W 74–61	5–1	FIU Arena (305); Miami, FL
December 3*; 8:00 pm		at Illinois; ACC–Big Ten Women's Challenge	L 63–86	5–2	State Farm Center (1,253); Champaign, IL
December 6*; 7:00 pm		Delaware State	W 100–62	6–2	John Paul Jones Arena (2,998); Charlottesville, VA
December 16*; 7:00 pm		Longwood	W 91–49	7–2	John Paul Jones Arena (2,841); Charlottesville, VA
December 19*; 7:00 pm		Saint Mary's	W 62–49	8–2	John Paul Jones Arena (2,950); Charlottesville, VA
December 21*; 6:00 pm		Howard	W 74–53	9–2	John Paul Jones Arena (3,014); Charlottesville, VA
December 28*; 2:30 pm		Davidson; Holiday Inn University Area Cavalier Classic	L 57–67	9–3	John Paul Jones Arena (3,302); Charlottesville, VA
December 29*; 7:00 pm		Drexel; Holiday Inn University Area Cavalier Classic	W 72–66	10–3	John Paul Jones Arena (3,031); Charlottesville, VA
Conference regular season
January 4; 2:00 pm		at Virginia Tech; Commonwealth Classic	W 62–47	11–3 (1–0)	Cassell Coliseum (1,225); Blacksburg, VA
January 8; 7:00 pm		Wake Forest	W 72–70	12–3 (2–0)	John Paul Jones Arena (3,034); Charlottesville, VA
January 11; 1:00 pm		at No. 21 Syracuse	L 58–70	12–4 (2–1)	Carrier Dome (708); Syracuse, NY
January 15; 7:00 pm		Boston College	W 68–56	13–4 (3–1)	John Paul Jones Arena (3,397); Charlottesville, VA
January 18; 3:00 pm, RSN		at No. 4 Louisville; Rivalry	L 55–67	13–5 (3–2)	KFC Yum! Center (11,322); Louisvilly, KY
January 21; 7:00 pm		at Miami (FL)	L 58–67	13–6 (3–3)	BankUnited Center (1,406); Miami, FL
January 25; 2:00 pm		Georgia Tech	L 62–68	13–7 (3–4)	John Paul Jones Arena (3,975); Charlottesville, VA
January 29; 7:00 pm		NC State	W 71–63	14–7 (4–4)	John Paul Jones Arena (3,092); Charlottesville, VA
February 1; 2:00 pm, ESPN3		at Clemson	W 77–72	15–7 (5–4)	Littlejohn Coliseum (902); Clemson, SC
February 5; 7:00 pm, ESPN3		at No. 4 Notre Dame	L 54–75	15–8 (5–5)	Edmund P. Joyce Center (8,738); South Bend, IN
February 12; 7:00 pm		No. 11 Duke	L 43–71	15–9 (5–6)	John Paul Jones Arena (3,333); Charlottesville, VA
February 15; 1:00 pm, RSN		No. 7 Florida State	L 56–65	15–10 (5–7)	John Paul Jones Arena (4,042); Charlottesville, VA
February 19; 7:00 pm		at Pittsburgh	L 63–68 ^{OT}	15–11 (5–8)	Petersen Events Center (736); Pittsburgh, PA
February 22; 1:00 pm		Virginia Tech; Commonwealth Classic	W 73–59	16–11 (6–8)	John Paul Jones Arena (3,772); Charlottesville, VA
February 26; 7:00 pm, RSN		at No. 15 North Carolina	L 70–72	16–12 (6–9)	Carmichael Arena (2,988); Chapel Hill, NC
March 1; 1:00 pm, RSN		No. 8 Louisville; Rivalry	W 75–59	17–12 (7–9)	John Paul Jones Arena (3,744); Charlottesville, VA
2015 ACC Tournament
March 5; 2:00 pm, RSN		vs. Miami (FL); Second Round	L 52–62	17–13	Greensboro Coliseum (3,688); Greensboro, NC
WNIT
March 19*; 7:00 pm		at Old Dominion; First Round	L 62–69	17–14	Ted Constant Convocation Center (973); Norfolk, VA
*Non-conference game. ^{#}Rankings from AP Poll. (#) Tournament seedings in parentheses. All times are in Eastern.

== Rankings ==
2014–15 NCAA Division I women's basketball rankings

Regular season polls
Poll	Pre- season	Week 2	Week 3	Week 4	Week 5	Week 6	Week 7	Week 8	Week 9	Week 10	Week 11	Week 12	Week 13	Week 14	Week 15	Week 16	Week 17	Week 18	Final
AP	NR	NR	NR	NR	NR	NR	NR	NR	NR	NR	NR	NR	NR	NR	NR	NR	NR	NR	NR
Coaches	NR	RV	RV	NR	NR	NR	NR	NR	NR	NR	NR	NR	NR	NR	NR	NR	NR	NR	NR

Legend
	Increase in ranking
	Decrease in ranking
	No change
(RV)	Received votes
(NR)	Not ranked

== See also ==
- 2014–15 Virginia Cavaliers men's basketball team
