= 2014–15 Clemson Tigers women's basketball team =

Intercollegiate basketball season

2014–15 Clemson Tigers women's basketball
- Conference: Atlantic Coast Conference
- Record: 9–21 (1–15 ACC)
- Head coach: Audra Smith (2nd season)
- Assistant coaches: Daryl Oliver (2nd season); Marc Wilson (2nd season); Kayla Ard (2nd season)
- Home arena: Littlejohn Coliseum

2014–15 ACC women's basketball standings
| | Conf. | | | | Overall |
| Team | W | | L | PCT | W | | L | PCT |
|---|---|---|---|---|---|---|---|---|
| No. 2 Notre Dame^{†} | 15 | – | 1 | .938 | 36 | – | 3 | .923 |
| No. 7 Florida State | 14 | – | 2 | .875 | 32 | – | 5 | .865 |
| No. 8 Louisville | 12 | – | 4 | .750 | 27 | – | 7 | .794 |
| No. 16 Duke | 11 | – | 5 | .688 | 23 | – | 11 | .676 |
| Syracuse | 11 | – | 5 | .688 | 22 | – | 10 | .688 |
| No. 15 North Carolina | 10 | – | 6 | .625 | 26 | – | 9 | .743 |
| Pittsburgh | 9 | – | 7 | .563 | 20 | – | 12 | .625 |
| Miami (FL) | 8 | – | 8 | .500 | 20 | – | 13 | .606 |
| Virginia | 7 | – | 9 | .438 | 17 | – | 14 | .548 |
| NC State | 7 | – | 9 | .438 | 18 | – | 15 | .545 |
| Georgia Tech | 7 | – | 9 | .438 | 19 | – | 15 | .559 |
| Boston College | 5 | – | 11 | .313 | 13 | – | 17 | .433 |
| Wake Forest | 2 | – | 14 | .125 | 13 | – | 20 | .394 |
| Virginia Tech | 1 | – | 15 | .063 | 12 | – | 20 | .375 |
| Clemson | 1 | – | 15 | .063 | 9 | – | 21 | .300 |
† 2015 ACC tournament winner As of 7 April 2015; Rankings from AP poll

The 2014–15 Clemson Tigers women's basketball team represented Clemson University during the 2014–15 college basketball season. Audra Smith resumed the responsibility as head coach for a second consecutive season. The Tigers, members of the Atlantic Coast Conference, played their home games at the Littlejohn Coliseum. They finished the season 9–21, 1–15 in ACC play to finish in a tie for fourteenth place. They lost in the first round of the ACC women's tournament to Georgia Tech.

== 2014–15 media ==
=== Clemson Tigers IMG Sports Network ===
The Clemson Tigers IMG Sports Network will broadcast all Tigers games. WCCP will broadcast select games. Games not on WCCP can be found online through the athletic website. Play-by-play will rotate while Dory Kidd will provide the analysis. Non-televised home games can be watched online via Tigercast with the Tigers Sports Network call.

== 2014–15 roster ==
2014–15 Clemson Tigers women's basketball team
Players
Coaches

| Pos. | # | Name | Height | Year | Previous school | Hometown |
|---|---|---|---|---|---|---|
| G/F | 00 | Shelbie Davenport | 6 ft 0 in (1.83 m) | Fr | Riverdale | Murfreesboro, Tenn. |
| G | 1 | Tiffany Lewis | 5 ft 8 in (1.73 m) | So | Chipola | Murfreesboro, Tenn. |
| G | 2 | Chelsea Lindsay | 5 ft 6 in (1.68 m) | Sr | Hillside HS | Durham, NC |
| G | 3 | Victoria Cardaci | 5 ft 5 in (1.65 m) | Fr | Holmdel | Holmdel, N.J. |
| C | 12 | MaKayla Johnson | 6 ft 4 in (1.93 m) | Fr | Dreher | Columbia, S.C. |
| G/F | 13 | Daneesha Provo | 5 ft 11 in (1.8 m) | Fr | Kent School | Dartmouth, Nova Scotia |
| G/F | 14 | Paige Mosley | 5 ft 11 in (1.8 m) | So | Wesleyan School | Peachtree Corners, GA |
| F/C | 15 | Nyilah Jamison-Myers | 6 ft 3 in (1.91 m) | Jr | Orangeburg-Wilkinson HS | Orangeburg, SC |
| G/F | 21 | Nikki Dixon | 5 ft 10 in (1.78 m) | Sr | Milton HS | Alpharetta, GA |
| C | 24 | Ivy Atkism | 6 ft 2 in (1.88 m) | Fr | George Walton Academy | Monroe, GA |
| G/F | 25 | Cha'nelle Perry | 5 ft 10 in (1.78 m) | Fr | Brimm Medical Arts | Camden, N.J. |
| G | 33 | Alexis Carter | 5 ft 7 in (1.7 m) | Fr | Tigard | Tigard, OR |
| C | 34 | Justice Wright | 6 ft 4 in (1.93 m) | Fr | Houston County | Warner Robins, GA |

Head coach

Audra Smith

Assistant coach(es)

Daryl Oliver
Marc Wilson
Kayla Ard

Legend

- (C) Team captain
- (S) Suspended
- (I) Ineligible
- (W) Walk-on
- Injured
- Current redshirt

Roster
Last update: 2014-09-14

== Schedule ==
| Date time, TV | Rank^{#} | Opponent^{#} | Result | Record | Site (attendance) city, state |
Exhibition
| 11/02/2014*; 2:00 pm | | Queens | W 73–36 | – | Littlejohn Coliseum (N/A); Clemson, SC |
| 11/08/2014*; 2:00 pm | | Georgia College | W 68–56 | – | Littlejohn Coliseum (N/A); Clemson, SC |
Regular Season
| 11/14/2014*; 12:00 pm | | UNC Greensboro | W 80–51 | 1–0 | Littlejohn Coliseum (1,051); Clemson, SC |
| 11/16/2014*; 2:00 pm | | Troy | W 82–73 | 2–0 | Littlejohn Coliseum (527); Clemson, SC |
| 11/20/2014*; 7:00 pm, SECN | | at No. 2 South Carolina; Battle of the Palmetto State | L 41–99 | 2–1 | Colonial Life Arena (11,012); Columbia, SC |
| 11/23/2014*; 7:00 pm | | Furman | W 79–69 | 3–1 | Littlejohn Coliseum (619); Clemson, SC |
| 11/27/2014*; 1:15 pm | | vs. Ohio State; Paradise Jam tournament | L 77–86 | 3–2 | Sports and Fitness Center (N/A); Saint Thomas, USVI |
| 11/28/2014*; 3:30 pm | | vs. Florida Gulf Coast; Paradise Jam Tournament | L 61–86 | 3–3 | Sports and Fitness Center (N/A); Saint Thomas, USVI |
| 11/29/2014*; 1:15 pm | | vs. Wichita State; Paradise Jam Tournament | L 48–63 | 3–4 | Sports and Fitness Center (N/A); Saint Thomas, USVI |
| 12/03/2014*; 12:00 pm | | at Middle Tennessee | L 28–69 | 3–5 | Murphy Center (11,307); Murfreesboro, TN |
| 12/06/2014*; 6:00 pm | | Tennessee Tech | W 76–61 | 4–5 | Littlejohn Coliseum (756); Clemson, SC |
| 12/13/2014*; 7:00 pm | | North Dakota | W 72–67 | 5–5 | Littlejohn Coliseum (702); Clemson, SC |
| 12/19/2014*; 7:00 pm | | Longwood | W 72–56 | 6–5 | Littlejohn Coliseum (578); Clemson, SC |
| 12/21/2014*; 2:00 pm | | South Carolina State | W 66–57 | 7–5 | Littlejohn Coliseum (593); Clemson, SC |
| 12/29/2014*; 7:00 pm | | NJIT | W 64–47 | 8–5 | Littlejohn Coliseum (490); Clemson, SC |
| 01/02/2015; 7:00 pm | | Virginia Tech | W 63–54 ^{OT} | 9–5 (1–0) | Littlejohn Coliseum (632); Clemson, SC |
| 01/04/2015; 2:00 pm | | at Georgia Tech | L 66–74 | 9–6 (1–1) | McCamish Pavilion (1,267); Atlanta, GA |
| 01/08/2015; 7:00 pm | | Florida State | L 52–87 | 9–7 (1–2) | Littlejohn Coliseum (557); Clemson, SC |
| 01/10/2015; 2:00 pm | | at NC State | L 50–76 | 9–8 (1–3) | Reynolds Coliseum (2,476); Raleigh, NC |
| 01/15/2015; 7:00 pm, ESPN3 | | at Miami (FL) | L 42–79 | 9–9 (1–4) | BankUnited Center (1,248); Coral Gables, FL |
| 01/18/2015; 2:00 pm | | No. 12 North Carolina | L 56–78 | 9–10 (1–5) | Littlejohn Coliseum (1,392); Clemson, SC |
| 01/24/2015; 5:00 pm | | No. 6 Notre Dame | L 36–74 | 9–11 (1–6) | Littlejohn Coliseum (1,214); Clemson, SC |
| 01/29/2015; 7:00 pm, RSN | | at Wake Forest | L 62–64 | 9–12 (1–7) | LJVM Coliseum (581); Winston-Salem, NC |
| 02/01/2015; 2:00 pm, ESPN3 | | Virginia | L 72–77 | 9–13 (1–8) | Littlejohn Coliseum (902); Clemson, SC |
| 02/05/2015; 7:00 pm | | at Boston College | L 53–68 | 9–14 (1–9) | Conte Forum (332); Chestnut Hill, MA |
| 02/08/2015; 2:00 pm | | at No. 15 Duke | L 60–89 | 9–15 (1–10) | Cameron Indoor Stadium (4,455); Durham, NC |
| 02/12/2015; 7:00 pm | | No. 9 Louisville | L 49–81 | 9–16 (1–11) | Littlejohn Coliseum (1,394); Clemson, SC |
| 02/19/2015; 7:00 pm | | at No. 9 Florida State | L 38–81 | 9–17 (1–12) | Donald L. Tucker Civic Center (2,819); Tallahassee, FL |
| 02/22/2015; 2:00 pm | | Georgia Tech | L 59–71 | 9–18 (1–13) | Littlejohn Coliseum (739); Clemson, SC |
| 02/26/2015; 7:00 pm, ESPN3 | | No. 23 Syracuse | L 55–60 | 9–19 (1–14) | Littlejohn Coliseum (454); Clemson, SC |
| 03/01/2015; 2:00 pm | | at Pittsburgh | L 56–61 | 9–20 (1–15) | Peterson Events Center (2,998); Pittsburgh, PA |
2015 ACC Tournament
| 03/04/2015; 6:30 pm, RSN | | vs. Georgia Tech; First Round | L 53–80 | 9–21 | Greensboro Coliseum (3,573); Greensboro, NC |
*Non-conference game. ^{#}Rankings from AP Poll. (#) Tournament seedings in parentheses. All times are in Eastern.

== Rankings ==
2014–15 NCAA Division I women's basketball rankings

Regular season polls
| Poll | Pre- Season | Week 2 | Week 3 | Week 4 | Week 5 | Week 6 | Week 7 | Week 8 | Week 9 | Week 10 | Week 11 | Week 12 | Week 13 | Week 14 | Week 15 | Week 16 | Week 17 | Week 18 | Final |
|---|---|---|---|---|---|---|---|---|---|---|---|---|---|---|---|---|---|---|---|
| AP | NR | NR | NR | NR | NR | NR | NR | NR | NR | NR | NR | NR | NR | NR | NR | NR | NR | NR | NR |
| Coaches | NR | NR | NR | NR | NR | NR | NR | NR | NR | NR | NR | NR | NR | NR | NR | NR | NR | NR | NR |

Legend
| | Increase in ranking |
| | Decrease in ranking |
| | No change |
| (RV) | Received votes |
| (NR) | Not ranked |
