= 2014–15 North Carolina Tar Heels women's basketball team =

Intercollegiate basketball season

2014–15 North Carolina Tar Heels women's basketball

NCAA Women's Tournament, Sweet Sixteen
- Conference: Atlantic Coast Conference

Ranking
- Coaches: No. 12
- AP: No. 15
- Record: 26–9 (10–6 ACC)
- Head coach: Sylvia Hatchell (29th season)
- Assistant coaches: Andrew Calder; Ivory Latta; Tracey Williams-Johnson
- Home arena: Carmichael Arena

2014–15 ACC women's basketball standings
	Conf.				Overall
Team	W		L	PCT	W		L	PCT
No. 2 Notre Dame^{†}	15	–	1	.938	36	–	3	.923
No. 7 Florida State	14	–	2	.875	32	–	5	.865
No. 8 Louisville	12	–	4	.750	27	–	7	.794
No. 16 Duke	11	–	5	.688	23	–	11	.676
Syracuse	11	–	5	.688	22	–	10	.688
No. 15 North Carolina	10	–	6	.625	26	–	9	.743
Pittsburgh	9	–	7	.563	20	–	12	.625
Miami (FL)	8	–	8	.500	20	–	13	.606
Virginia	7	–	9	.438	17	–	14	.548
NC State	7	–	9	.438	18	–	15	.545
Georgia Tech	7	–	9	.438	19	–	15	.559
Boston College	5	–	11	.313	13	–	17	.433
Wake Forest	2	–	14	.125	13	–	20	.394
Virginia Tech	1	–	15	.063	12	–	20	.375
Clemson	1	–	15	.063	9	–	21	.300
† 2015 ACC tournament winner As of 7 April 2015; Rankings from AP poll

The 2014–15 North Carolina Tar Heels women's basketball team represented the University of North Carolina at Chapel Hill during the 2014–15 NCAA Division I women's basketball season. The Tar Heels, led by twenty-ninth-year head coach Sylvia Hatchell, played their games at Carmichael Arena and were members of the Atlantic Coast Conference. They finished the season 26–9, 10–6 ACC play to finish in sixth place. They advanced to the quarterfinals of the ACC women's tournament, where they lost to Louisville. They received an at-large bid to the NCAA women's tournament, where they defeated Liberty in the first round and Ohio State in the second round, before losing to South Carolina in the sweet sixteen.

== Roster ==
2014–15 North Carolina Tar Heels women's basketball team
Players
Coaches

Pos.	#	Name	Height	Year	Previous school	Hometown
G	0	Jamie Cherry	5 ft 8 in (1.73 m)	Fr	West Craven	Cove City, N.C.
F	1	Stephanie Mavunga	6 ft 3 in (1.91 m)	So	Brownsburg	Indianapolis, Ind.
G	2	Coleman Latifah	5 ft 9 in (1.75 m)	Sr	Central	Pageland, S.C.
G	3	Buckland Megan	6 ft 0 in (1.83 m)	Jr	Bishop McGuinness	High Point, N.C.
G	10	Butts Danielle	5 ft 10 in (1.78 m)	Sr	South Central	Winterville, N.C.
G	11	Rountree Brittany	5 ft 9 in (1.75 m)	Sr	The Potter's House	Jacksonville, Fla.
F	13	Fuller Hillary	6 ft 2 in (1.88 m)	RS So	The Potter's House	Jacksonville, Fla.
G	15	Allisha Gray	6 ft 0 in (1.83 m)	So	Washington County	Sandersville, Ga.
G	22	Bryant N'Dea	6 ft 0 in (1.83 m)	Jr	Goose Creek	Goose Creek, S.C.
G	24	Washington Jessica	5 ft 8 in (1.73 m)	So	Jenks	Tulsa, Okla.
F	30	Summers Hillary	6 ft 2 in (1.88 m)	RS So	Village Christian Academy	Fayetteville, N.C.
G	31	Johnson Erika	6 ft 1 in (1.85 m)	Sr	Holy Names Academy	Seattle, Wash.
F	34	McDaniel Xylina	6 ft 2 in (1.88 m)	Jr	Spring Valley	Columbia, S.C.

Head coach

- Sylvia Hatchell (Carson-Newman)

Assistant coach(es)

- Andrew Calder (Coker)
- Ivory Latta (North Carolina)
- Tracey Williams-Johnson (UNC Pembroke)

Legend

- (C) Team captain
- (S) Suspended
- (I) Ineligible
- (W) Walk-on
- Injured
- Current redshirt

Roster
Last update: 2014-10-17

== Schedule ==
Date time, TV	Rank^{#}	Opponent^{#}	Result	Record	Site (attendance) city, state
Exhibition
11/05/2014*; 6:00 pm	No. 13	Carson-Newman	W 88–27	–	Carmichael Arena (N/A); Chapel Hill, NC
11/10/2014*; 6:00 pm	No. 13	Wingate	W 92–50	–	Carmichael Arena (N/A); Chapel Hill, NC
Non-conference regular season
11/14/2014*; 6:00 pm	No. 13	Howard	W 83–49	1–0	Carmichael Arena (1,915); Chapel Hill, NC
11/16/2014*; 2:00 pm	No. 13	No. 23 UCLA	W 84–68	2–0	Carmichael Arena (3,077); Chapel Hill, NC
11/19/2014*; 6:00 pm, ESPN3	No. 11	No. 21 Oklahoma State	W 79–77	3–0	Carmichael Arena (2,575); Chapel Hill, NC
11/23/2014*; 6:00 pm, P12N	No. 11	at Oregon	W 76–59	4–0	Matthew Knight Arena (2,038); Eugene, OR
11/28/2014*; 8:00 pm	No. 11	vs. No. 5 Stanford; Rainbow Wahine Showdown	W 70–54	5–0	Stan Sheriff Center (N/A); Honolulu, HI
11/29/2014*; 8:00 pm	No. 11	vs. Prairie View A&M; Rainbow Wahine Showdown	W 81–45	6–0	Stan Sheriff Center (N/A); Honolulu, HI
11/30/2014*; 10:30 pm	No. 11	at Hawaiʻi; Rainbow Wahine Showdown	W 74–65	7–0	Stan Sheriff Center (1,983); Honolulu, HI
12/04/2014*; 7:00 pm, BTN	No. 6	at No. 18 Rutgers; ACC–Big Ten Women's Challenge	W 96–93 ^{2OT}	8–0	The RAC (2,028); Piscataway, NJ
12/14/2014*; 2:00 pm	No. 6	Appalachian State	W 84–52	9–0	Carmichael Arena (2,724); Chapel Hill, NC
12/16/2014*; 6:00 pm, ESPN3	No. 6	No. 16 Oregon State	L 55–70	9–1	Carmichael Arena (1,809); Chapel Hill, NC
12/19/2014*; 7:00 pm	No. 6	vs. Maine; Carolinas Challenge	W 65–36	10–1	Myrtle Beach Convention Center (837); Myrtle Beach, SC
12/21/2014*; 3:00 pm	No. 6	vs. Elon; Carolinas Challenge	W 85–67	11–1	Myrtle Beach Convention Center (N/A); Myrtle Beach, SC
12/30/2014*; 2:00 pm	No. 9	Albany	W 71–56	12–1	Carmichael Arena (4,123); Chapel Hill, NC
01/02/2015*; 2:00 pm	No. 9	East Tennessee State	W 95–62	13–1	Carmichael Arena (2,829); Chapel Hill, NC
ACC regular season
01/04/2015; 3:00 pm, RSN	No. 9	NC State; Carolina–State Game	W 72–56	14–1 (1–0)	Carmichael Arena (5,421); Chapel Hill, NC
01/08/2015; 7:00 pm	No. 8	at Pittsburgh	L 59–84	14–2 (1–1)	Peterson Events Center (1,121); Pittsburgh, PA
01/11/2015; 3:00 pm, RSN	No. 8	Georgia Tech	W 96–81	15–2 (2–1)	Carmichael Arena (3,129); Chapel Hill, NC
01/11/2015; 7:00 pm, RSN	No. 12	No. 7 Notre Dame	L 79–89	15–3 (2–2)	Carmichael Arena (4,358); Chapel Hill, NC
01/18/2015; 2:00 pm	No. 12	at Clemson	W 78–56	16–3 (3–2)	Littlejohn Coliseum (1,392); Clemson, SC
01/22/2015; 7:00 pm	No. 12	at NC State; Carolina–State Game	W 67–63	17–3 (4–2)	Reynolds Coliseum (2,736); Raleigh, NC
01/25/2015; 5:00 pm, ESPN2	No. 12	No. 15 Duke	L 67–74 ^{OT}	17–4 (4–3)	Carmichael Arena (6,822); Chapel Hill, NC
02/01/2015; 2:00 pm, ESPN3	No. 16	Boston College	W 72–60	18–4 (5–3)	Carmichael Arena (3,802); Chapel Hill, NC
02/05/2015; 7:00 pm, ESPN3	No. 13	at No. 25 Syracuse	L 56–61	18–5 (5–4)	Carrier Dome (564); Syracuse, NY
02/08/2015; 1:00 pm, RSN	No. 13	at Virginia Tech	W 74–52	19–5 (6–4)	Cassell Coliseum (2,297); Blacksburg, VA
02/12/2015; 7:00 pm, RSN	No. 17	No. 9 Florida State	W 71–63	20–5 (7–4)	Carmichael Arena (3,211); Chapel Hill, NC
02/15/2015; 1:00 pm, ESPN2	No. 17	at No. 9 Louisville	L 66–75	20–6 (7–5)	KFC Yum! Center (13,115); Louisville, KY
02/19/2015; 7:00 pm, ESPN3	No. 17	Wake Forest	W 83–45	21–6 (8–5)	Carmichael Arena (3,224); Chapel Hill, NC
02/22/2015; 3:00 pm, RSN	No. 17	at Miami (FL)	W 66–65	22–6 (9–5)	BankUnited Center (2,132); Coral Gables, FL
02/26/2015; 7:00 pm, RSN	No. 15	Virginia	W 72–70	23–6 (10–5)	Carmichael Arena (2,988); Chapel Hill, NC
03/01/2015; 1:00 pm, ESPN2	No. 15	at No. 16 Duke	L 80–81	23–7 (10–6)	Cameron Indoor Stadium (9,314); Durham, NC
ACC Women's Tournament
03/05/2015; 8:00 pm, RSN	No. 15	vs. Georgia Tech; Second Round	W 84–64	24–7	Greensboro Coliseum (5,359); Greensboro, NC
03/06/2015; 8:00 pm, RSN	No. 15	vs. No. 10 Louisville; Quarterfinals	L 75–77 ^{OT}	24–8	Greensboro Coliseum (5,848); Greensboro, NC
NCAA Women's Tournament
03/21/2015*; 11:00 am, ESPN2	No. 15	Liberty; First Round	W 71–65	25–8	Carmichael Arena (2,098); Chapel Hill, NC
03/23/2015*; 6:30 pm, ESPN2	No. 15	No. 23 Ohio State; Second Round	W 86–84	26–8	Carmichael Arena (2,163); Chapel Hill, NC
03/27/2015*; 7:15 pm, ESPN	No. 15	vs. No. 3 South Carolina; Sweet Sixteen	L 65–67	26–9	Greensboro Coliseum (N/A); Greensboro, NC
*Non-conference game. ^{#}Rankings from AP Poll. (#) Tournament seedings in parentheses. All times are in Eastern.

== Rankings ==
Regular season polls
Poll	Pre- season	Week 2	Week 3	Week 4	Week 5	Week 6	Week 7	Week 8	Week 9	Week 10	Week 11	Week 12	Week 13	Week 14	Week 15	Week 16	Week 17	Week 18	Final
AP	13	11	11	6	6	6	9	9	8	12	12	16	13	17	17	15	15	15	15
Coaches	13	11	12	6	6	6	8	7	6	10	11	12	11	14	14	11	12	12	12

Legend
	Increase in ranking
	Decrease in ranking
	No change
(RV)	Received votes
(NR)	Not ranked

== See also ==
- 2014–15 North Carolina Tar Heels men's basketball team
