= 2014–15 Pittsburgh Panthers women's basketball team =

Intercollegiate basketball season

2014–15 Pittsburgh Panthers women's basketball

NCAA Women's Tournament, second round
- Conference: Atlantic Coast Conference
- Record: 20–12 (9–7 ACC)
- Head coach: Suzie McConnell-Serio (2nd season)
- Assistant coaches: Kathy McConnell-Miller (2nd season); Carmen Bruce (2nd season); Lindsay Richards (2nd season)
- Home arena: Petersen Events Center

2014–15 ACC women's basketball standings
	Conf.				Overall
Team	W		L	PCT	W		L	PCT
No. 2 Notre Dame^{†}	15	–	1	.938	36	–	3	.923
No. 7 Florida State	14	–	2	.875	32	–	5	.865
No. 8 Louisville	12	–	4	.750	27	–	7	.794
No. 16 Duke	11	–	5	.688	23	–	11	.676
Syracuse	11	–	5	.688	22	–	10	.688
No. 15 North Carolina	10	–	6	.625	26	–	9	.743
Pittsburgh	9	–	7	.563	20	–	12	.625
Miami (FL)	8	–	8	.500	20	–	13	.606
Virginia	7	–	9	.438	17	–	14	.548
NC State	7	–	9	.438	18	–	15	.545
Georgia Tech	7	–	9	.438	19	–	15	.559
Boston College	5	–	11	.313	13	–	17	.433
Wake Forest	2	–	14	.125	13	–	20	.394
Virginia Tech	1	–	15	.063	12	–	20	.375
Clemson	1	–	15	.063	9	–	21	.300
† 2015 ACC tournament winner As of 7 April 2015; Rankings from AP poll

The 2014–15 Pittsburgh Panthers women's basketball team represented the University of Pittsburgh during the 2014–15 college basketball season. Suzie McConnell-Serio resumed responsibility as head coach for a second consecutive season. The Panthers, second-year members of the Atlantic Coast Conference, played their home games at the Petersen Events Center. They finished the season 20–12, 9–7 in ACC play to finish in seventh place. They lost in the second round of the ACC women's tournament to Virginia Tech. They received an at-large bid to the NCAA women's tournament, where they defeated Chattanooga in the first round before being defeated by Tennessee in the second round.

== 2014–15 media ==
=== Pitt Panthers Sports Network ===
The Pitt Panthers Sports Network broadcast all Panthers games on WJAS. George Von Benko provided the play-by-play while Jen Tuscano provided the analysis. Non-televised home games were aired online via Pitt Panthers TV with the Panthers Sports Network call.

== 2014–15 roster ==
2014–15 Pittsburgh Panthers women's basketball team
Players
Coaches

Pos.	#	Name	Height	Year	Previous school	Hometown
G	2	Aysia Bugg	5 ft 7 in (1.7 m)	Fr	Bolingbrook	Chicago, Ill.
G	3	Brianna Kiesel	5 ft 7 in (1.7 m)	Sr	Thomas R. Proctor	Utica, N.Y.
F	12	Yacine Diop	5 ft 10 in (1.78 m)	Fr	Seton-LaSalle	Dakar, Senegal
G	14	Fred Potvin	5 ft 11 in (1.8 m)	So	Vanier College	Montreal, Canada
G	22	Chelsea Welch	5 ft 9 in (1.75 m)	So	Fairmont	Kettering, Ohio
F	24	Monica Wignot	6 ft 3 in (1.91 m)	GS	Holy Redeemer	Wilkes Barre, Pa.
G	25	Brittany Gordon	5 ft 8 in (1.73 m)	Jr	South Charleston	South Charleston, W.Virginia
F	35	Stasha Carey	6 ft 2 in (1.88 m)	Fr	Berea-Midpark	Cleveland, Ohio
C	44	Bubbles Anderson	6 ft 11 in (2.11 m)	RS So	Rutgers Prep (NJ)	Clarendon, Jamaica
F/C	51	Cora McManus	6 ft 0 in (1.83 m)	Sr	Garfield	Seattle

Head coach

Suzie McConnell-Serio

Assistant coach(es)

Kathy McConnell-Miller
Carmen Bruce
Lindsay Richards

Legend

- (C) Team captain
- (S) Suspended
- (I) Ineligible
- (W) Walk-on
- Injured
- Current redshirt

Roster
Last update: 2014-09-13

== Schedule ==
Date time, TV	Rank^{#}	Opponent^{#}	Result	Record	Site (attendance) city, state
Exhibition
11/03/2014*; 2:00 pm		Indiana (PA)	W 69–61	–	Peterson Events Center (830); Pittsburgh
Regular season
11/14/2014*; 11:00 am		Princeton	L 43–59	0–1	Peterson Events Center (3,798); Pittsburgh
11/17/2014*; 7:00 pm		Niagara	W 70–54	1–1	Peterson Events Center (804); Pittsburgh
11/20/2014*; 7:00 pm		Michigan	W 85–64	2–1	Peterson Events Center (707); Pittsburgh
11/23/2014*; 2:00 pm		at James Madison	L 64–80	2–2	JMU Convocation Center (2,157); Harrisonburg, Virginia
11/26/2014*; 2:00 pm		Radford	W 72–47	3–2	Peterson Events Center (356); Pittsburgh
11/30/2014*; 2:00 pm		Loyola (MD)	W 84–46	4–2	Peterson Events Center (523); Pittsburgh
12/03/2014*; 7:00 pm		at Ohio State; ACC–Big Ten Women's Challenge	W 78–74	5–2	Value City Arena (3,777); Columbus, Ohio
12/07/2014*; 2:00 pm		at Duquesne; City Game	L 77–87	5–3	Palumbo Center (821); Pittsburgh
12/14/2014*; 2:00 pm		Drexel	W 72–53	6–3	Peterson Events Center (798); Pittsburgh
12/18/2014*; 7:00 pm		Ball State	W 59–47	7–3	Peterson Events Center (413); Pittsburgh
12/21/2014*; 2:00 pm		Youngstown State	W 78–52	8–3	Peterson Events Center (827); Pittsburgh
12/28/2014*; 2:00 pm		Saint Francis (PA)	W 97–59	9–3	Peterson Events Center (854); Pittsburgh
12/30/2014*; 5:00 pm		Delaware State	W 93–54	10–3	Peterson Events Center (914); Pittsburgh
01/04/2015; 2:00 pm, ESPN3		No. 7 Louisville	L 57–63	10–4 (0–1)	Peterson Events Center (1,811); Pittsburgh
01/08/2015; 7:00 pm, ESPN3		No. 8 North Carolina	W 84–59	11–4 (1–1)	Peterson Events Center (1,121); Pittsburgh
01/15/2015; 7:00 pm, ESPN3		at No. 20 Florida State	L 43–58	11–5 (1–2)	Donald L. Tucker Civic Center (2,259); Tallahassee, Florida
01/18/2015; 2:00 pm		at Georgia Tech	W 75–72 ^{OT}	12–5 (2–2)	McCamish Pavilion (1,548); Atlanta
01/22/2015; 7:00 pm		No. 23 Syracuse	L 60–68	12–6 (2–3)	Peterson Events Center (1,003); Pittsburgh
01/24/2015; 4:00 pm, RSN		Boston College	W 78–70	13–6 (3–3)	Peterson Events Center (3,921); Pittsburgh
01/29/2015; 6:30 pm		at No. 17 Duke	L 45–62	13–7 (3–4)	Cameron Indoor Stadium (4,333); Durham, North Carolina
02/01/2015; 1:00 pm, ESPN3		Miami (FL)	W 81–66	14–7 (4–4)	Peterson Events Center (1,401); Pittsburgh
02/05/2015; 7:00 pm		at NC State	W 60–50	15–7 (5–4)	Reynolds Center (1,719); Raleigh, North Carolina
02/08/2015; 2:00 pm		at No. 8 Louisville	L 35–48	15–8 (5–5)	KFC Yum! Center (13,656); Syracuse, New York
02/12/2015; 7:00 pm		Virginia Tech	W 53–35	16–8 (6–5)	Peterson Events Center (742); Pittsburgh
02/15/2015; 2:00 pm		at Wake Forest	W 65–41	17–8 (7–5)	LJVM Coliseum (642); Winston-Salem, North Carolina
02/19/2015; 7:00 pm, ESPN3		Virginia	W 68–63 ^{OT}	18–8 (8–5)	Peterson Events Center (736); Pittsburgh
02/22/2015; 12:00 pm		at No. 25 Syracuse	L 54–68	18–9 (8–6)	Carrier Dome (1,226); Syracuse, New York
02/26/2015; 7:00 pm		at No. 4 Notre Dame	L 59–87	18–10 (8–7)	Edmund P. Joyce Center (8,810); South Bend, Indiana
03/01/2015; 2:00 pm		Clemson	W 61–56	19–10 (9–7)	Peterson Events Center (2,998); Pittsburgh
2015 ACC Tournament
03/05/2015; 6:00 pm, RSN		vs. Virginia Tech; Second Round	L 45–51	19–11	Greensboro Coliseum (N/A); Greensboro, North Carolina
NCAA Women's Tournament
03/21/2015*; 11:00 am, ESPN2		vs. Chattanooga; First Round	W 51–40	20–11	Thompson–Boling Arena (N/A); Knoxville, Tennessee
03/23/2015*; 6:30 pm, ESPN2		at No. 6 Tennessee; Second Round	L 67–77	20–12	Thompson–Boling Arena (5,712); Knoxville, Tennessee
*Non-conference game. ^{#}Rankings from AP Poll. (#) Tournament seedings in parentheses. All times are in Eastern.

== Rankings ==
Regular season polls
Poll	Pre- season	Week 2	Week 3	Week 4	Week 5	Week 6	Week 7	Week 8	Week 9	Week 10	Week 11	Week 12	Week 13	Week 14	Week 15	Week 16	Week 17	Week 18	Final
AP	NR	NR	NR	NR	NR	NR	NR	NR	NR	NR	RV	NR	NR	NR	RV	NR	NR	NR	NR
Coaches	NR	NR	NR	NR	NR	NR	NR	NR	NR	NR	NR	NR	NR	NR	NR	NR	NR	NR	NR

Legend
	Increase in ranking
	Decrease in ranking
	No change
(RV)	Received votes
(NR)	Not ranked

== See also ==
- 2014–15 Pittsburgh Panthers men's basketball team
- Pittsburgh Panthers women's basketball
