= 2014–15 Virginia Tech Hokies women's basketball team =

Intercollegiate basketball season

2014–15 Virginia Tech Hokies women's basketball
- Conference: Atlantic Coast Conference
- Record: 12–20 (1–15 ACC)
- Head coach: Dennis Wolff (4th season)
- Assistant coaches: Thomas Joyce (4th season); Bett Shelby (2nd season); Jermaine Woods (2nd season)
- Home arena: Cassell Coliseum

2014–15 ACC women's basketball standings
	Conf.				Overall
Team	W		L	PCT	W		L	PCT
No. 2 Notre Dame^{†}	15	–	1	.938	36	–	3	.923
No. 7 Florida State	14	–	2	.875	32	–	5	.865
No. 8 Louisville	12	–	4	.750	27	–	7	.794
No. 16 Duke	11	–	5	.688	23	–	11	.676
Syracuse	11	–	5	.688	22	–	10	.688
No. 15 North Carolina	10	–	6	.625	26	–	9	.743
Pittsburgh	9	–	7	.563	20	–	12	.625
Miami (FL)	8	–	8	.500	20	–	13	.606
Virginia	7	–	9	.438	17	–	14	.548
NC State	7	–	9	.438	18	–	15	.545
Georgia Tech	7	–	9	.438	19	–	15	.559
Boston College	5	–	11	.313	13	–	17	.433
Wake Forest	2	–	14	.125	13	–	20	.394
Virginia Tech	1	–	15	.063	12	–	20	.375
Clemson	1	–	15	.063	9	–	21	.300
† 2015 ACC tournament winner As of 7 April 2015; Rankings from AP poll

The 2014–15 Virginia Tech Hokies women's basketball team represented Virginia Tech during the 2014–15 NCAA Division I women's basketball season. Dennis Wolff resumed the responsibility as head coach for a fourth consecutive season. The Hokies were members of the Atlantic Coast Conference and play their home games at the Cassell Coliseum. They finished the season 12–20, 1–15 in ACC play to finish in a tie for fourteenth place. They advanced to the quarterfinals of the ACC women's tournament where they lost to Florida State.

== 2014–15 media ==
=== Virginia Tech Hokies Sports Network ===
The Virginia Tech Hokies IMG Sports Network broadcast Hokies games on WNMX. Andrew Allegretta provide dthe call for the games and for select ESPN3 games. All WNMX games and games not on WNMX could be heard online through HokiesXtra.

== 2014–15 Roster ==
2014–15 Virginia Tech Hokies women's basketball team
Players
Coaches

Pos.	#	Name	Height	Year	Previous school	Hometown
F	00	Brielle Blaire	6 ft 2 in (1.88 m)	Fr	North Rowan	Salisbury, N.C.
F	2	Sidney Cook	6 ft 2 in (1.88 m)	So	Southview	Parkton, N.C.
F	4	Hannah Young	6 ft 1 in (1.85 m)	Jr	St. Francis Xavier College	Newcastle, Australia
G	5	Vanessa Panousis	5 ft 7 in (1.7 m)	So	Brigidine College Randwick	Sydney, Australia
F	11	Regan Magarity	6 ft 3 in (1.91 m)	Fr	Igelstavikens Gymnasium	Norrköping, Sweden
G	15	Maddison Penn	6 ft 0 in (1.83 m)	So	Pymble Ladies College	Avoca Beach, Australia
G	22	Lindsey Oblitey	5 ft 9 in (1.75 m)	Fr	Paul VI	Fairfax, Va.
G	23	Rachel Camp	5 ft 11 in (1.8 m)	Fr	East Rutherford	Forest City, N.C.
F	24	Taijah Campbell	6 ft 3 in (1.91 m)	Jr	Pickering	Toronto, Canada
G	25	Samantha Hill	5 ft 10 in (1.78 m)	So	Eastern Commerce	Toronto, Canada
G	33	Kelsey Conyers	5 ft 9 in (1.75 m)	Sr	Cosby	Chesterfield, Va.
C	35	Tara Nahodil	6 ft 4 in (1.93 m)	So	Tri-Valley	Pine Grove, Pa.
F	40	Dominique Powell	6 ft 3 in (1.91 m)	Jr	Archbishop Carroll/Gulf Coast State	Washington, D.C.
F/C	45	Khadedra Croker	6 ft 2 in (1.88 m)	Fr	King Fork	Suffolk, Va.

Head coach

Dennis Wolff

Assistant coach(es)

Morgan Valley
Bett Shelby
Jermaine Woods

Legend

- (C) Team captain
- (S) Suspended
- (I) Ineligible
- (W) Walk-on
- Injured
- Current redshirt

Roster
Last update: 2014-09-13

== Schedule ==
Date time, TV	Rank^{#}	Opponent^{#}	Result	Record	Site (attendance) city, state
Exhibition
11/10/2014*; 7:00 pm		Washington and Lee	W 93–12	–	Cassell Coliseum (N/A); Blacksburg, VA
Regular Season
11/14/2014*; 5:00 pm		at George Mason	L 69–77	0–1	Patriot Center (1,119); Fairfax, VA
11/16/2014*; 12:00 pm		Maryland Eastern Shore	W 63–41	1–1	Cassell Coliseum (1,203); Blacksburg, VA
11/18/2014*; 7:00 pm		Norfolk State	W 60–49	2–1	Cassell Coliseum (1,194); Blacksburg, VA
11/23/2014*; 1:00 pm		at Providence	W 72–69	3–1	Alumni Hall (282); Providence, RI
11/25/2014*; 7:00 pm		Old Dominion	L 62–69	3–2	Cassell Coliseum (1,189); Blacksburg, VA
11/29/2014*; 5:00 pm		East Tennessee	W 72–65	4–2	Cassell Coliseum (1,119); Blacksburg, VA
12/01/2014*; 9:00 pm, SECN		at Florida	L 44–73	4–3	O'Connell Center (925); Gainesville, FL
12/04/2014*; 7:00 pm		Northwestern; ACC–Big Ten Women's Challenge	L 45–70	4–4	Cassell Coliseum (1,430); Blacksburg, VA
12/06/2014*; 2:00 pm		Longwood	W 74–42	5–4	Cassell Coliseum (1,149); Blacksburg, VA
12/10/2014*; 7:00 pm		North Carolina Central	W 80–44	6–4	Cassell Coliseum (1,394); Blacksburg, VA
12/14/2014*; 12:00 pm		Western Carolina	W 79–58	7–4	Cassell Coliseum (1,183); Blacksburg, VA
12/21/2014*; 1:00 pm		Radford	W 73–60	8–4	Cassell Coliseum (1,253); Blacksburg, VA
12/30/2014*; 7:00 pm		Hofstra	W 60–43	9–4	Cassell Coliseum (1,006); Blacksburg, VA
01/02/2015; 7:00 pm		at Clemson	L 54–63 ^{OT}	9–5 (0–1)	Littlejohn Coliseum (632); Clemson, SC
01/04/2015; 2:00 pm		Virginia; Commonwealth Challenge	L 47–62	9–6 (0–2)	Cassell Coliseum (1,225); Blacksburg, VA
01/08/2015; 7:00 pm		at NC State	L 59–73	9–7 (0–3)	Reynolds Center (1,394); Raleigh, NC
01/11/2015; 2:00 pm		Miami (FL)	L 45–62	9–8 (0–4)	Cassell Coliseum (1,627); Blacksburg, VA
01/15/2015; 6:30 pm		at No. 16 Duke	L 40–65	9–9 (0–5)	Cameron Indoor Stadium (4,010); Durham, NC
01/18/2015; 2:00 pm		No. 20 Florida State	L 44–59	9–10 (0–6)	Cassell Coliseum (1,971); Blacksburg, VA
01/23/2015; 7:00 pm, RSN		Wake Forest	W 76–59	10–10 (1–6)	Cassell Coliseum (2,611); Blacksburg, VA
01/29/2015; 7:00 pm, ESPN3		No. 4 Notre Dame	L 50–74	10–11 (1–7)	Cassell Coliseum (1,835); Blacksburg, VA
02/01/2015; 2:00 pm		at Georgia Tech	L 71–79	10–12 (1–8)	McCamish Pavilion (1,072); Atlanta, GA
02/05/2015; 7:00 pm		at Miami (FL)	L 39–42	10–13 (1–9)	BankUnited Center (1,109); Coral Gables, FL
02/08/2015; 1:00 pm, RSN		No. 13 North Carolina	L 52–74	10–14 (1–10)	Cassell Coliseum (2,297); Blacksburg, VA
02/12/2015; 7:00 pm		at Pittsburgh	L 35–53	10–15 (1–11)	Peterson Events Center (742); Pittsburgh, PA
02/15/2015; 2:00 pm		No. 23 Syracuse	L 51–59	10–16 (1–12)	Cassell Coliseum (1,702); Blacksburg, VA
02/19/2015; 7:00 pm		No. 8 Louisville	L 49–69	10–17 (1–13)	Cassell Coliseum (1,573); Blacksburg, VA
02/22/2015; 1:00 pm		at Virginia; Commonwealth Challenge	L 59–73	10–18 (1–14)	John Paul Jones Arena (3,772); Charlottesville, VA
03/01/2015; 1:00 pm		at Boston College	L 47–49	10–19 (1–15)	Conte Forum (1,183); Chestnut Hill, MA
2015 ACC Tournament
03/04/2015; 3:30 pm, RSN		vs. NC State; First Round	W 57–56	11–19	Greensboro Coliseum (3,917); Greensboro, NC
03/05/2015; 6:00 pm, RSN		vs. Pittsburgh; Second Round	W 51–45	12–19	Greensboro Coliseum (N/A); Greensboro, NC
03/06/2015; 6:00 pm, RSN		vs. No. 7 Florida State; Quarterfinals	L 43–82	12–20	Greensboro Coliseum (N/A); Greensboro, NC
*Non-conference game. ^{#}Rankings from AP Poll. (#) Tournament seedings in parentheses. All times are in Eastern.

== Rankings ==
2014–15 NCAA Division I women's basketball rankings

Regular season polls
Poll	Pre- Season	Week 2	Week 3	Week 4	Week 5	Week 6	Week 7	Week 8	Week 9	Week 10	Week 11	Week 12	Week 13	Week 14	Week 15	Week 16	Week 17	Week 18	Final
AP	NR	NR	NR	NR	NR	NR	NR	NR	NR	NR	NR	NR	NR	NR	NR	NR	NR	NR	NR
Coaches	NR	NR	NR	NR	NR	NR	NR	NR	NR	NR	NR	NR	NR	NR	NR	NR	NR	NR	NR

Legend
	Increase in ranking
	Decrease in ranking
	No change
(RV)	Received votes
(NR)	Not ranked

== See also ==
- Virginia Tech Hokies women's basketball
