= 1996–97 Boston University Terriers men's basketball team =

American college basketball season

1996–97 Boston University Terriers men's basketball

America East Regular season champions America East tournament champions

NCAA tournament
- Conference: America East Conference
- Record: 25–5 (17–1 AE)
- Head coach: Dennis Wolff (3rd season)
- Home arena: Case Gym

1996–97 America East Conference men's basketball standings
	Conf.				Overall
Team	W		L	PCT	W		L	PCT
Boston University †	17	–	1	.944	25	–	5	.833
Drexel	16	–	2	.889	22	–	9	.710
Hartford	11	–	7	.611	17	–	11	.607
Hofstra	9	–	9	.500	12	–	15	.444
Delaware	9	–	9	.500	12	–	15	.444
Vermont	7	–	11	.389	14	–	13	.519
Northeastern	6	–	12	.333	7	–	20	.259
Maine	6	–	12	.333	11	–	20	.355
New Hampshire	5	–	13	.278	7	–	20	.259
Towson State	5	–	13	.278	9	–	19	.321
† 1997 America East tournament winner Rankings from AP poll

The 1996–97 Boston University Terriers men's basketball team represented Boston University during the 1996–97 NCAA Division I men's basketball season. The Terriers, led by third year head coach Dennis Wolff, played their home games at Case Gym and were members of the America East Conference. They finished the season 25–5, 17–1 in America East play to win the regular season conference title. The Terriers won the America East tournament to receive an automatic bid to the NCAA tournament as No. 12 seed in the Midwest region. Boston University was defeated by No. 5 seed Tulsa in the opening round, 81–52.

Senior forward Tunji Awojobi was selected America East Player of the Year and finished his career as BU's all-time leader in scoring, rebounding, and blocks.

== Roster ==
1996–97 Boston University Terriers men's basketball team
Players
Coaches

Pos.	#	Name	Height	Weight	Year	Hometown
PF	12	Tunji Awojobi	6 ft 7 in (2.01 m)	240 lb (109 kg)	Sr	Lagos, Nigeria
C	5	Joey Beard	6 ft 10 in (2.08 m)	—	Jr

Head coach

- Dennis Wolff (Connecticut)

Assistant coach(es)

Legend

- (C) Team captain
- (S) Suspended
- (I) Ineligible
- (W) Walk-on
- Injured
- Current redshirt

== Schedule and results ==
Date time, TV	Rank^{#}	Opponent^{#}	Result	Record	Site (attendance) city, state
Regular season
Nov 22, 1996*		vs. Florida A&M	W 85–54	1–0	Charles E. Smith Center (4,000); Washington, D.C.
Nov 23, 1996*		at No. 24 George Washington	L 68–73	1–1	Charles E. Smith Center (4,540); Washington, D.C.
Nov 30, 1996*		vs. East Carolina	W 68–66	2–1	Halifax Metro Centre (3,612); Halifax, Nova Scotia
Dec 6, 1996		at Towson State	W 81–63	3–1 (1–0)	Towson Center (975); Towson, Maryland
Dec 8, 1996		at Delaware	W 58–56	4–1 (2–0)	Bob Carpenter Center (2,827); Newark, Delaware
Dec 10, 1996*		at Harvard	W 80–72	5–1	Lavietes Pavilion (745); Cambridge, Massachusetts
Dec 12, 1996*		at TCU	L 80–81	5–2	Daniel-Meyer Coliseum (3,692); Fort Worth, Texas
Dec 23, 1996*		at Rhode Island	L 61–69	5–3	Keaney Gymnasium (3,001); Kingston, Rhode Island
Dec 27, 1996*		vs. Loyola (MD)	W 71–51	6–3	Sun Dome (2,000); Tampa, Florida
Dec 28, 1996*		at South Florida	W 65–49	7–3	Sun Dome (3,613); Tampa, Florida
Jan 2, 1997		at New Hampshire	W 61–54	8–3 (3–0)	Lundholm Gym (1,050); Durham, New Hampshire
Jan 4, 1997		Maine	W 67–62 ^{OT}	9–3 (4–0)	Case Gym (801); Boston, Massachusetts
Jan 10, 1997		Hofstra	W 70–65	10–3 (5–0)	Case Gym (748); Boston, Massachusetts
Jan 12, 1997		Drexel	W 71–67 ^{OT}	11–3 (6–0)	Case Gym (1,064); Boston, Massachusetts
Jan 16, 1997		at Hartford	W 61–49	12–3 (7–0)	Chase Arena at Reich Family Pavilion (1,136); Hartford, Connecticut
Jan 18, 1997		at Vermont	W 69–68	13–3 (8–0)	Roy L. Patrick Gymnasium (1,200); Burlington, Vermont
Jan 21, 1997		Northeastern	W 59–48	14–3 (9–0)	Case Gym (1,039); Boston, Massachusetts
Jan 24, 1997		Delaware	W 79–72 ^{OT}	15–3 (10–0)	Case Gym (967); Boston, Massachusetts
Jan 26, 1997		Towson State	W 78–69	16–3 (11–0)	Case Gym (845); Boston, Massachusetts
Feb 1, 1997		at Northeastern	W 70–52	17–3 (12–0)	Matthews Arena (1,251); Boston, Massachusetts
Feb 7, 1997		at Hofstra	W 70–58	18–3 (13–0)	Physical Fitness Center (2,237); Hempstead, New York
Feb 9, 1997		at Drexel	L 42–73	18–4 (13–1)	Daskalakis Athletic Center (2,369); Philadelphia, Pennsylvania
Feb 13, 1997		Vermont	W 61–56	19–4 (14–1)	Case Gym (819); Boston, Massachusetts
Feb 15, 1997		Hartford	W 69–66	20–4 (15–1)	Case Gym (1,965); Boston, Massachusetts
Feb 20, 1997		New Hampshire	W 63–60	21–4 (16–1)	Case Gym (1,842); Boston, Massachusetts
Feb 23, 1997		at Maine	W 57–50	22–4 (17–1)	Alfond Arena (3,553); Orono, Maine
America East tournament
Mar 1, 1997*		vs. Maine; Quarterfinals	W 67–49	23–4	Bob Carpenter Center (2,778); Newark, Delaware
Mar 2, 1997*		at Delaware; Semifinals	W 69–65	24–4	Bob Carpenter Center (3,500); Newark, Delaware
Mar 7, 1997*		Drexel; Championship game	W 68–61	25–4	Case Gym (2,200); Boston, Massachusetts
NCAA tournament
Mar 14, 1997*	(12 MW)	vs. (5 MW) Tulsa; First round	L 52–81	25–5	Kemper Arena (12,100); Kansas City, Missouri
*Non-conference game. ^{#}Rankings from AP poll. (#) Tournament seedings in parentheses. MW=Midwest. All times are in Eastern Time.

== Awards and honors ==
- Tunji Awojobi – America East Player of the Year
