= Dennis Wolff =

American basketball coach (born 1955)

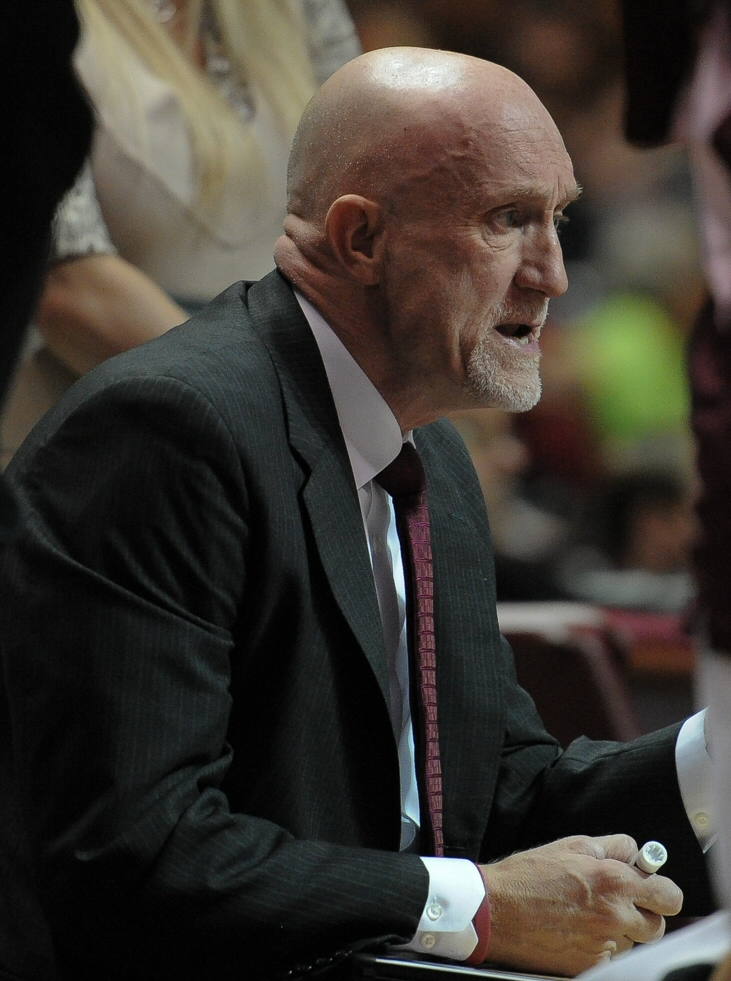
- Wolff at Virginia Tech in 2013

Biographical details
- Born: March 1, 1955 (age 71); New York City, New York, U.S.

Playing career
- 1973–1975: LSU
- 1976–1978: UConn
- Position: Guard

Coaching career (HC unless noted)
- 1980–1982: Connecticut College
- 1982–1985: St. Bonaventure (assistant)
- 1985–1989: Wake Forest (assistant)
- 1989–1990: SMU (assistant)
- 1990–1994: Virginia (assistant)
- 1994–2009: Boston University
- 2009–2010: Virginia Tech (assistant)
- 2011–2016: Virginia Tech (women's)

Administrative career (AD unless noted)
- 2016–2021: Old Dominion (DBO)

Head coaching record
- Overall: 277–215 (men's); 62–93 (women's)
- Tournaments: 0–2 (NCAA Division I); 0–3 (NIT); 1–1 (WNIT)

Accomplishments and honors

Championships
- 2 America East tournament (1997, 2002); 5 America East regular season (1997, 1998, 2002–2004)

Awards
- 3× America East Coach of the Year (1997, 2003, 2004)

Dennis Wolff (born March 1, 1955) is an American basketball coach whose most recent coaching position was with the Virginia Tech Hokies women's team. The role is Wolff's first job coaching a women's team. Prior to the role, Wolff served as director of basketball operations and assistant to the head coach for the Virginia Tech men's team. He is the former head coach of men's basketball at Boston University, a position from which he was fired on March 11, 2009, after 15 seasons.

Wolff, a native of New York City, finished his collegiate basketball career at UConn after playing two years at LSU. He became the head coach at Boston University following the 1993–94 season, taking over for Bob Brown. He was previously the head coach at Connecticut College, where he coached from 1980 to 1982. In between his head coaching jobs, Wolff was an assistant at St. Bonaventure, Wake Forest, SMU, and the University of Virginia. Wolff left BU with a record of 247–197, the most wins in school history. His career overall record is 277–215 in men's college basketball and 62–93 in women's.

The following season, Wolff was the Director of Operations for Virginia Tech under Seth Greenberg.

That following season, athletic director Jim Weaver named him the new Virginia Tech women's basketball coach.

After bringing the Virginia Tech women's basketball team to the postseason, making the NIT, for the first time since 2006–07, Wolff was fired on March 22, 2016.

From 2016 to 2021, Wolff was Director of Basketball Operations for Old Dominion University under head coach Jeff Jones.

== Family ==
Wolff and his wife, JoAnn, have three children: Nicole, Matthew and Michael. Nicole played for the University of Connecticut women's basketball team, while Matthew played for his father at Boston University and is an assistant coach at American University. Michael played hockey at Brown University.

== Head coaching record ==
=== Men's ===
Record table
Season	Team	Overall	Conference	Standing	Postseason
Connecticut College Camels (NCAA Division III independent) (1980–1982)
1980–81	Connecticut College	16–8			
1981–82	Connecticut College	14–10			
Connecticut College:		30–18			
Boston University Terriers (America East Conference) (1994–2009)
1994–95	Boston University	15–16	7–9	T–4th	
1995–96	Boston University	18–11	13–5	2nd	
1996–97	Boston University	25–5	17–1	1st	NCAA Division I First Round
1997–98	Boston University	19–11	12–6	T–1st	
1998–99	Boston University	9–18	5–13	8th	
1999–00	Boston University	7–22	5–13	T–8th	
2000–01	Boston University	14–14	9–9	5th	
2001–02	Boston University	22–10	13–3	T–1st	NCAA Division I First Round
2002–03	Boston University	20–11	13–3	T–1st	NIT First Round
2003–04	Boston University	23–6	17–1	1st	NIT Opening Round
2004–05	Boston University	20–9	14–4	3rd	NIT First Round
2005–06	Boston University	12–16	9–7	T–3rd	
2006–07	Boston University	12–18	8–8	3rd	
2007–08	Boston University	14–17	9–7	6th	
2008–09	Boston University	17–13	11–5	3rd	
Boston University:		247–197	162–94		
Total:		277–215			
National champion Postseason invitational champion Conference regular season champion Conference regular season and conference tournament champion Division regular season champion Division regular season and conference tournament champion Conference tournament champion

=== Women's ===
Record table
Season	Team	Overall	Conference	Standing	Postseason
Virginia Tech Hokies (Atlantic Coast Conference) (2011–2016)
2011–12	Virginia Tech	7–23	3–13	13th	
2012–13	Virginia Tech	10–20	4–14	12th	
2013–14	Virginia Tech	14–16	4–12	12th	
2014–15	Virginia Tech	12–20	1–15	14th	
2015–16	Virginia Tech	18–14	5–11	11th	WNIT Second Round
Virginia Tech:		62–93	17–65		
Total:		62–93			
