= 1996–97 Drexel Dragons men's basketball team =

American college basketball season

1996–97 Drexel Dragons men's basketball

NIT tournament first round, L 53–66
- Conference: America East Conference
- Record: 22–9 (16–2 AEC)
- Head coach: Bill Herrion (6th season)
- Assistant coach: Steve Seymour (6th season)
- Home arena: Daskalakis Athletic Center

1996–97 America East Conference men's basketball standings
	Conf.				Overall
Team	W		L	PCT	W		L	PCT
Boston University †	17	–	1	.944	25	–	5	.833
Drexel	16	–	2	.889	22	–	9	.710
Hartford	11	–	7	.611	17	–	11	.607
Hofstra	9	–	9	.500	12	–	15	.444
Delaware	9	–	9	.500	12	–	15	.444
Vermont	7	–	11	.389	14	–	13	.519
Northeastern	6	–	12	.333	7	–	20	.259
Maine	6	–	12	.333	11	–	20	.355
New Hampshire	5	–	13	.278	7	–	20	.259
Towson State	5	–	13	.278	9	–	19	.321
† 1997 America East tournament winner Rankings from AP poll

The 1996–97 Drexel Dragons men's basketball team represented Drexel University during the 1996–97 NCAA Division I men's basketball season. The Dragons, led by 6th year head coach Bill Herrion, played their home games at the Daskalakis Athletic Center and were members of the America East Conference (AEC).

The team finished the season 22–9, and finished in 2nd place in the AEC in the regular season.

The Dragons were eliminated in the first round of the NIT by Bradley.

== Roster ==
1996–97 Drexel Dragons men's basketball team
Players	Coaches
Pos. / # / Name / Height / Weight / Year / Previous school / Hometown; / / / — / —	Head coach: Bill Herrion (Merrimack); Assistant coach(es): Steve Seymour (Bridgewater State); Legend: (C) Team captain; (S) Suspended; (I) Ineligible; (W) Walk-on; Injured; Current redshirt

== Schedule ==
Date time, TV	Rank^{#}	Opponent^{#}	Result	Record	High points	High rebounds	High assists	Site (attendance) city, state
Regular season
November 20, 1996*		at Evansville; Preseason NIT	L 61–65	0–1	–	–	–	Roberts Municipal Stadium (7,820); Evansville, IN
December 3, 1996*		Monmouth	W 77–66	1–1	29 – Myers	9 – Linderman	6 – Guittar	Daskalakis Athletic Center (1,755); Philadelphia, PA
December 6, 1996		at New Hampshire	W 80–55	2–1 (1–0)	–	–	–	Lundholm Gym (875); Durham, NH
December 8, 1996		at Maine	W 71–57	3–1 (2–0)	–	–	–	Alfond Arena (1,116); Orono, ME
December 12, 1996*		at UMass	L 48–69	3–2	–	–	–	Mullins Center (9,493); Amherst, MA
December 14, 1996*		at La Salle	L 58–63	3–3	–	–	–	Spectrum (1,745); Philadelphia, PA
December 21, 1996*		Lehigh	W 92–73	4–3	–	–	–	Daskalakis Athletic Center (1,102); Philadelphia, PA
December 28, 1996*		at Charleston; College of Charleston Tournament semifinal	L 65–75	4–4	–	–	–	F. Mitchell Johnson Arena (3,722); Charleston, SC
December 29, 1996*		vs. UNC Greensboro; College of Charleston Tournament 3rd place	W 69–61	5–4	–	–	–	F. Mitchell Johnson Arena (2,561); Charleston, SC
January 2, 1997		Hartford	W 86–79	6–4 (3–0)	–	–	–	Daskalakis Athletic Center (1,007); Philadelphia, PA
January 4, 1997		vs. Vermont	W 74–49	7–4 (4–0)	–	–	–	Spectrum (1,925); Philadelphia, PA
January 7, 1997		Towson State	W 102–72	8–4 (5–0)	–	–	–	Daskalakis Athletic Center (1,579); Philadelphia, PA
January 10, 1997		at Northeastern	L 54–57	8–5 (5–1)	–	–	–	Matthews Arena (720); Boston, MA
January 12, 1997		at Boston University	L 67–71 ^{OT}	8–6 (5–2)	–	–	–	Case Gym (1,064); Boston, MA
January 15, 1997*		at Penn; Battle of 33rd Street	W 58–52	9–6	14 – Linderman	–	–	Palestra (5,108); Philadelphia, PA
January 18, 1997		at Hofstra	W 64–61	10–6 (6–2)	–	–	–	Hofstra Physical Fitness Center (1,583); Hempstead, NY
January 21, 1997		at Delaware	W 77–73	11–6 (7–2)	–	–	–	Bob Carpenter Center (4,048); Newark, DE
January 24, 1997		Maine	W 74–51	12–6 (8–2)	–	–	–	Daskalakis Athletic Center (2,006); Philadelphia, PA
January 26, 1997		New Hampshire	W 77–74 ^{2OT}	13–6 (9–2)	–	–	–	Daskalakis Athletic Center (1,244); Philadelphia, PA
January 31, 1997		Delaware	W 74–70	14–6 (10–2)	–	–	–	Daskalakis Athletic Center (2,369); Philadelphia, PA
February 2, 1997		at Towson State	W 79–66	15–6 (11–2)	–	–	–	Towson Center (702); Towson, MD
February 7, 1997		Northeastern	W 78–61	16–6 (12–2)	–	–	–	Daskalakis Athletic Center (1,978); Philadelphia, PA
February 9, 1997		Boston University	W 73–42	17–6 (13–2)	–	–	–	Daskalakis Athletic Center (2,369); Philadelphia, PA
February 11, 1997*		at Saint Joseph's	L 62–63	17–7	–	–	–	Hagan Arena (3,200); Philadelphia, PA
February 16, 1997		Hofstra	W 83–70	18–7 (14–2)	–	–	–	Daskalakis Athletic Center (2,369); Philadelphia, PA
February 20, 1997		at Hartford	W 87–76	19–7 (15–2)	–	–	–	Chase Arena (1,280); Hartford, CT
February 22, 1997		at Vermont	W 78–59	20–7 (16–2)	–	–	–	Patrick Gym (1,409); Burlington, VT
AEC tournament
March 1, 1997	(2)	vs. (10) Towson State; Quarterfinal	W 78–75	21–7	–	–	–	Bob Carpenter Center (2,504); Newark, DE
March 2, 1997	(2)	vs. (3) Hartford; Semifinal	W 75–69	22–7	–	–	–	Bob Carpenter Center (3,651); Newark, DE
March 7, 1997	(2)	at (1) Boston University; Championship	L 61–68	22–8	–	–	–	Case Gym (2,600); Boston, MA
NIT
March 12, 1997		at Bradley; First Round	L 53–66	22–9	–	–	–	Carver Arena (8,277); Peoria, IL
*Non-conference game. ^{#}Rankings from AP. (#) Tournament seedings in parentheses. All times are in Eastern Time.

== Awards ==
Mike DeRocckis

- AEC All-Conference Second Team

Chuck Guittar

- AEC All-Conference Third Team
- AEC Player of the Week

Joe Linderman

- AEC Rookie of the Year
- AEC All-Conference Third Team
- AEC All-Rookie Team
- AEC All-Championship Team
- AEC Rookie of the Week (2)

Jeff Myers

- AEC All-Conference First Team
- AEC All-Championship Team
- AEC Player of the Week (2)
