= 2014–15 Miami Hurricanes women's basketball team =

Women's basketball team

2014–15 Miami Hurricanes women's basketball

Miami Thanksgiving Tournament Champions Miami Holiday Tournament Champions

NCAA Women's Tournament, second round
- Conference: Atlantic Coast Conference
- Record: 20–13 (8–8 ACC)
- Head coach: Katie Meier (10th season)
- Assistant coaches: Octavia Blue; Darrick Gubbs; Zach Kancher
- Home arena: BankUnited Center

2014–15 ACC women's basketball standings
	Conf.				Overall
Team	W		L	PCT	W		L	PCT
No. 2 Notre Dame^{†}	15	–	1	.938	36	–	3	.923
No. 7 Florida State	14	–	2	.875	32	–	5	.865
No. 8 Louisville	12	–	4	.750	27	–	7	.794
No. 16 Duke	11	–	5	.688	23	–	11	.676
Syracuse	11	–	5	.688	22	–	10	.688
No. 15 North Carolina	10	–	6	.625	26	–	9	.743
Pittsburgh	9	–	7	.563	20	–	12	.625
Miami (FL)	8	–	8	.500	20	–	13	.606
Virginia	7	–	9	.438	17	–	14	.548
NC State	7	–	9	.438	18	–	15	.545
Georgia Tech	7	–	9	.438	19	–	15	.559
Boston College	5	–	11	.313	13	–	17	.433
Wake Forest	2	–	14	.125	13	–	20	.394
Virginia Tech	1	–	15	.063	12	–	20	.375
Clemson	1	–	15	.063	9	–	21	.300
† 2015 ACC tournament winner As of 7 April 2015; Rankings from AP poll

The 2014–15 Miami hurricanes women's basketball team represented the University of Miami during the 2014–15 NCAA Division I women's basketball season. The Hurricanes, led by tenth-year head coach Katie Meier, played their home games at the BankUnited Center and were members of the Atlantic Coast Conference. They finished the season 20–13, 8–8 in ACC play to finish in eighth place. They advanced to the quarterfinals of the ACC women's tournament, where they lost to Notre Dame. They received an at-large bid to the NCAA women's tournament, where they upset Washington in the first round before losing to Iowa in the second round.

== Roster ==
2014–15 Miami Hurricanes women's basketball team
Players
Coaches

Pos.	#	Name	Height	Year	Previous school	Hometown
F	0	Keyanna Harris	6 ft 0 in (1.83 m)	Fr	Pershing	Palm Beach Gardens, FL
G	3	Jessica Thomas	5 ft 6 in (1.68 m)	So	Buchholz	Gainesville, FL
G	5	Nigia Greene	5 ft 10 in (1.78 m)	RS Fr	St. Francis	Atlanta, GA
G	10	Michelle Woods	5 ft 8 in (1.73 m)	Sr	Community	Naples, FL
G	12	Laura Quevedo	6 ft 1 in (1.85 m)	Fr	Rivas Ecópolis	Madrid, Spain
G	14	Aisha Edwards	5 ft 8 in (1.73 m)	Fr	West Boca Raton	Boca Raton, FL
F	15	Necole Sterling	5 ft 10 in (1.78 m)	Sr	Stonewall Jackson; Gulf Coast Community	Los Angeles, CA
F	20	Keyona Hayes	6 ft 1 in (1.85 m)	Sr	St. Francis	Marietta, GA
F	21	Jassany Williams	6 ft 2 in (1.88 m)	RS Sr	Nova	Davie, FL
G	23	Adrienne Motley	5 ft 9 in (1.75 m)	So	Woodside	Newport News, VA
F	25	Khaila Prather	6 ft 1 in (1.85 m)	Fr	Riverdale Baptist HS	Baltimore, MD
F	30	Erykah Davenport	6 ft 2 in (1.88 m)	Fr	Tucker HS	Tucker, GA
G	33	Suriya McGuire	5 ft 11 in (1.8 m)	Sr	Roosevelt	Minneapolis, MN

Head coach

- Katie Meier (Duke)

Assistant coach(es)

- Octavia Blue (Miami (FL))
- Darrick Gibbs (Wofford)
- Zach Kancher (George Washington)

Legend

- (C) Team captain
- (S) Suspended
- (I) Ineligible
- (W) Walk-on
- Injured
- Current redshirt

== Media ==
All home games and conference road games will be broadcast on WVUM as part of the Miami Hurricanes Learfield Sports contract.

== Schedule ==
Date time, TV	Rank^{#}	Opponent^{#}	Result	Record	Site (attendance) city, state
Exhibition
Nov 6, 2014*; 4:00 pm		Nova Southeastern	W 69–42	–	BankUnited Center (N/A); Coral Gables, FL
Non-conference regular season
Nov 14, 2014*; 11:00 am		Oakland	W 66–53	1–0	BankUnited Center (2,726); Coral Gables, FL
Nov 17, 2014*; 8:00 pm, ASN		at Middle Tennessee	L 48–53	1–1	Murphy Center (3,806); Murfreesboro, TN
Nov 21, 2014*; 8:00 pm		North Florida	W 81–53	2–1	BankUnited Center (674); Coral Gables, FL
Nov 25, 2014*; 7:00 pm		Arizona State	L 61–65	2–2	BankUnited Center (584); Coral Gables, FL
Nov 28, 2014*; 1:00 pm		Illinois State; Miami Thanksgiving Tournament	W 95–44	3–2	BankUnited Center (600); Coral Gables, FL
Nov 29, 2014*; 1:00 pm		Tulsa; Miami Thanksgiving Tournament	W 69–57	4–2	BankUnited Center (558); Coral Gables, FL
Dec 4, 2014*; 7:00 pm		Wisconsin; ACC–Big Ten Women's Challenge	W 66–54	5–2	BankUnited Center (593); Coral Gables, FL
Dec 6, 2014*; 7:00 pm		Jacksonville	W 65–36	6–2	BankUnited Center (638); Coral Gables, FL
Dec 13, 2014*; 1:00 pm		Coppin State	W 70–54	7–2	BankUnited Center (1,546); Coral Gables, FL
Dec 18, 2014*; 6:00 pm		vs. UCLA; Tulane DoubleTree Classic	W 74–67	8–2	Devlin Fieldhouse (213); New Orleans, LA
Dec 19, 2014*; 8:00 pm		at Tulane; Tulane DoubleTree Classic	L 65–70	8–3	Devlin Fieldhouse (1,022); New Orleans, LA
Dec 28, 2014*; 1:00 pm		Florida A&M; Miami Holiday Tournament	W 83–47	9–3	BankUnited Center (1,167); Coral Gables, FL
Dec 29, 2014*; 3:30 pm		LSU; Miami Holiday Tournament	W 76–71	10–3	BankUnited Center (1,134); Coral Gables, FL
ACC regular season
Jan 4, 2015; 1:00 pm		Boston College	W 74–53	11–3 (1–0)	BankUnited Center (1,095); Coral Gables, FL
Jan 8, 2015; 7:00 pm, ESPN3		No. 4 Notre Dame	W 78–63	12–3 (2–0)	BankUnited Center (1,836); Coral Gables, FL
Jan 11, 2015; 2:00 pm		at Virginia Tech	W 62–45	13–3 (3–0)	Cassell Coliseum (1,627); Blacksburg, VA
Jan 15, 2015; 7:00 pm, ESPN3		Clemson	W 79–42	14–3 (4–0)	BankUnited Center (1,248); Coral Gables, FL
Jan 18, 2015; 1:00 pm, RSN		at No. 16 Duke	L 53–68	14–4 (4–1)	Cameron Indoor Stadium (4,564); Durham, NC
Jan 21, 2015; 7:00 pm, ESPN3		Virginia	W 67–58	15–4 (5–1)	BankUnited Center (1,406); Coral Gables, FL
Jan 25, 2015; 5:00 pm, RSN		at No. 4 Louisville	L 55–68	15–5 (5–2)	KFC Yum! Center (9,887); Louisville, KY
Feb 01, 2015; 1:00 pm, ESPN3		at Pittsburgh	L 66–81	15–6 (5–3)	Peterson Events Center (1,401); Pittsburgh, PA
Feb 5, 2015; 7:00 pm		Virginia Tech	W 42–39	16–6 (6–3)	BankUnited Center (1,109); Coral Gables, FL
Feb 8, 2015; 2:00 pm, ESPN3		at No. 9 Florida State	L 60–80	16–7 (6–4)	Donald L. Tucker Civic Center (3,435); Tallahassee, FL
Feb 12, 2015; 7:00 pm		at No. 23 Syracuse	W 85–71	17–7 (7–4)	Carrier Dome (435); Syracuse, NY
Feb 15, 2015; 3:00 pm, RSN		Georgia Tech	W 64–59	18–7 (8–4)	BankUnited Center (1,442); Coral Gables, FL
Feb 19, 2015; 7:00 pm		at NC State	L 65–68	18–8 (8–5)	Reynolds Center (1,570); Raleigh, NC
Feb 22, 2015; 2:00 pm, RSN		No. 17 North Carolina	L 65–66	18–9 (8–6)	BankUnited Center (2,132); Coral Gables, FL
Feb 26, 2015; 7:00 pm		at Wake Forest	L 59–60	18–10 (8–7)	LJVM Coliseum (318); Winston-Salem, NC
Mar 01, 2015; 3:00 pm, RSN		No. 9 Florida State	L 55–69	18–11 (8–8)	BankUnited Center (2,077); Coral Gables, FL
ACC Women's Tournament
Mar 5, 2015; 2:00 pm, RSN		vs. Virginia; Second Round	W 62–52	19–11	Greensboro Coliseum (3,688); Greensboro, NC
Mar 6, 2015; 2:00 pm, RSN		vs. No. 2 Notre Dame; Quarterfinals	L 61–77	19–12	Greensboro Coliseum (4,019); Greensboro, NC
NCAA Women's Tournament
Mar 20, 2015*; 12:00 pm, ESPN2		vs. Washington; First Round	W 86–80	20–12	Carver–Hawkeye Arena (N/A); Iowa City, IA
Mar 22, 2015*; 12:00 pm, ESPN2		at No. 18 Iowa; Second Round	L 70–88	20–13	Carver–Hawkeye Arena (7,220); Iowa City, IA
*Non-conference game. ^{#}Rankings from AP Poll. (#) Tournament seedings in parentheses. All times are in Eastern.

== Rankings ==
Regular season polls
Poll	Pre- season	Week 2	Week 3	Week 4	Week 5	Week 6	Week 7	Week 8	Week 9	Week 10	Week 11	Week 12	Week 13	Week 14	Week 15	Week 16	Week 17	Week 18	Final
AP	NR	NR	NR	NR	NR	NR	NR	NR	NR	RV	RV	NR	NR	NR	RV	NR	NR	NR	NR
Coaches	NR	NR	NR	NR	NR	NR	NR	NR	NR	RV	RV	RV	NR	NR	RV	RV	NR	NR	NR

Legend
	Increase in ranking
	Decrease in ranking
	No change
(RV)	Received votes
(NR)	Not ranked

== See also ==
- 2014–15 Miami Hurricanes men's basketball team
