= 2014–15 Wake Forest Demon Deacons women's basketball team =

Intercollegiate basketball season

2014–15 Wake Forest Demon Deacons women's basketball
- Conference: Atlantic Coast Conference
- Record: 13–20 (2–14 ACC)
- Head coach: Jen Hoover (3rd season)
- Assistant coaches: Mike Terry (3rd season); Gayle Coats Fulks (3rd season); Clarisse Garcia (2nd season)
- Home arena: LJVM Coliseum

2014–15 ACC women's basketball standings
	Conf.				Overall
Team	W		L	PCT	W		L	PCT
No. 2 Notre Dame^{†}	15	–	1	.938	36	–	3	.923
No. 7 Florida State	14	–	2	.875	32	–	5	.865
No. 8 Louisville	12	–	4	.750	27	–	7	.794
No. 16 Duke	11	–	5	.688	23	–	11	.676
Syracuse	11	–	5	.688	22	–	10	.688
No. 15 North Carolina	10	–	6	.625	26	–	9	.743
Pittsburgh	9	–	7	.563	20	–	12	.625
Miami (FL)	8	–	8	.500	20	–	13	.606
Virginia	7	–	9	.438	17	–	14	.548
NC State	7	–	9	.438	18	–	15	.545
Georgia Tech	7	–	9	.438	19	–	15	.559
Boston College	5	–	11	.313	13	–	17	.433
Wake Forest	2	–	14	.125	13	–	20	.394
Virginia Tech	1	–	15	.063	12	–	20	.375
Clemson	1	–	15	.063	9	–	21	.300
† 2015 ACC tournament winner As of 7 April 2015; Rankings from AP poll

The 2014–15 Wake Forest Demon Deacons women's basketball team represented Wake Forest University during the 2014–15 college basketball season. Jen Hoover resumed the responsibility as head coach for a third consecutive season. The Demon Deacons were members of the Atlantic Coast Conference and played their home games at the Lawrence Joel Veterans Memorial Coliseum. They finished the season 13–20, 2–14 in ACC play to finish in thirteenth place. They advanced to the quarterfinals of the ACC women's tournament, where they lost to Duke.

== 2014–15 media ==
=== Wake Forest IMG Sports Network ===
The Wake Forest Demon Deacons IMG Sports Network broadcast Hokies games on Wake Forest All Access. Information was also posted on Twitter @WakeWBB. Post-game interviews were posted on the school's YouTube channel.

== Roster ==
2014–15 Wake Forest Demon Deacons women's basketball team
Players
Coaches

Pos.	#	Name	Height	Year	Previous school	Hometown
G	2	Amber Campbell	5 ft 9 in (1.75 m)	Fr	Northwood Academy	Charleston, SC
G	3	Ataijah Taylor	5 ft 9 in (1.75 m)	So	Salem	Roanoke, VA
G	4	Mykia Jones	5 ft 8 in (1.73 m)	So	Millbrook	Raleigh, NC
G	10	Taylor Gordon	5 ft 11 in (1.8 m)	Fr	McEachern	Powder Springs, GA
G	11	Jill Brunori	6 ft 1 in (1.85 m)	So	Hilton Head Preparatory	Hilton Head, SC
F	14	Susie Webster	6 ft 3 in (1.91 m)	Sr	Marietta	Marietta, GA
G	15	Millesa Calicott	6 ft 0 in (1.83 m)	Sr	Mount Tabor	Winston-Salem, NC
F	22	Keri Fulp	6 ft 3 in (1.91 m)	So	East Surry	Shoals, NC
G	24	Kelila Atkinson	6 ft 0 in (1.83 m)	RS So	Riverdale Baptist	Woodbridge, VA
F	25	Dearica Hamby	6 ft 3 in (1.91 m)	Sr	Norcross	Marietta, GA
F	32	Milan Quinn	6 ft 1 in (1.85 m)	So	Phillip O. Berry Academy of Technology	Charlotte, NC
F	40	Nicole Floyd	6 ft 2 in (1.88 m)	Fr	Stonewall Jackson	Manassas, VA
F	42	Kandice Ball	6 ft 3 in (1.91 m)	Jr	Oak Hill Academy	Pulaski, VA

Head coach

- Jen Hoover (Wake Forest)

Assistant coach(es)

- Mike Terry (Western Ontario)
- Gayle Coats Fulks (Fairleigh Dickinson)
- Clairsse Garcia (Villanova)

Legend

- (C) Team captain
- (S) Suspended
- (I) Ineligible
- (W) Walk-on
- Injured
- Current redshirt

Roster
Last update: 2014-07-05

== Schedule ==
Date time, TV	Rank^{#}	Opponent^{#}	Result	Record	Site (attendance) city, state
Regular season
11/15/2014*; 2:00 pm		Longwood	W 64–60	1–0	LJVM Coliseum (511); Winston-Salem, NC
11/18/2014*; 7:00 pm		Tennessee Tech	W 89–62	2–0	LJVM Coliseum (358); Winston-Salem, NC
11/21/2014*; 6:00 pm		Marquette	W 89–77	3–0	LJVM Coliseum (821); Winston-Salem, NC
11/23/2014*; 2:00 pm		Coppin State	W 65–54	4–0	LJVM Coliseum (427); Winston-Salem, NC
11/27/2014*; 8:30 pm		vs. Princeton; Cancún Challenge Mayan Division	L 55–72	4–1	Hard Rock Resort (650); Playa del Carmen, Mexico
11/28/2014*; 8:30 pm		vs. Charlotte; Cancún Challenge Mayan Division	W 65–58	5–1	Hard Rock Resort (650); Playa de Carmen, Mexico
11/29/2014*; 6:00 pm		vs. Montana; Cancún Challenge Mayan Division	W 73–60	6–1	Hard Rock Resort (650); Playa del Carmen, Mexico
12/03/2014*; 7:00 pm		at Michigan; ACC–Big Ten Women's Challenge	L 69–83	6–2	Crisler Center (1,225); Ann Arbor, MI
12/07/2014*; 1:00 pm		Arizona	L 69–72 ^{OT}	6–3	LJVM Coliseum (512); Winston-Salem, NC
12/14/2014*; 2:00 pm		at Richmond	L 72–79	6–4	Robins Center (521); Richmond, VA
12/18/2014*; 11:30 am		Towson	W 74–64	7–4	LJVM Coliseum (4,845); Winston-Salem, NC
12/20/2014*; 2:00 pm		Missouri	L 64–79	7–5	LJVM Coliseum (422); Winston-Salem, NC
12/28/2014*; 2:00 pm		American	W 77–64	8–5	LJVM Coliseum (551); Winston-Salem, NC
12/31/2014*; 3:30 pm		Western Carolina	W 77–59	9–5	LJVM Coliseum (1,334); Winston-Salem, NC
01/04/2015; 2:00 pm		at No. 10 Duke	L 63–70	9–6 (0–1)	Cameron Indoor Stadium (4,207); Durham, NC
01/08/2015; 7:00 pm		at Virginia	L 70–72	9–7 (0–2)	John Paul Jones Arena (3,034); Charlottesville, NC
01/11/2015; 2:00 pm		No. 6 Louisville	L 68–79	9–8 (0–3)	LJVM Coliseum (719); Winston-Salem, NC
01/15/2015; 7:00 pm		at No. 25 Syracuse	L 62–73	9–9 (0–4)	Carrier Dome (364); Syracuse, NY
01/18/2015; 2:00 pm		NC State	L 70–78	9–10 (0–5)	LJVM Coliseum (1,240); Winston-Salem, NC
01/23/2015; 7:00 pm, RSN		at Virginia Tech	L 59–76	9–11 (0–6)	Cassell Coliseum (2,611); Blacksburg, VA
01/25/2015; 7:00 pm		at No. 17 Florida State	L 80–110	9–12 (0–7)	Donald L. Tucker Civic Center (2,779); Tallahassee, FL
01/29/2015; 7:00 pm, RSN		Clemson	W 64–62	10–12 (1–7)	LJVM Coliseum (581); Winston-Salem, NC
02/01/2015; 1:00 pm, RSN		at No. 4 Notre Dame	L 63–92	10–13 (1–8)	Edmund P. Joyce Center (8,741); South Bend, IN
02/05/2015; 7:00 pm		No. 15 Duke	L 53–70	10–14 (1–9)	LJVM Coliseum (867); Winston-Salem, NC
02/08/2015; 2:00 pm		at NC State	L 55–71	10–15 (1–10)	Reynolds Coliseum (3,119); Raleigh, NC
02/12/2015; 7:00 pm		Boston College	L 74–75	10–16 (1–11)	LJVM Coliseum (342); Winston-Salem, NC
02/15/2015; 2:00 pm		Pittsburgh	L 41–65	10–17 (1–12)	LJVM Coliseum (642); Winston-Salem, NC
02/19/2015; 7:00 pm, ESPN3		at No. 17 North Carolina	L 45–83	10–18 (1–13)	Carmichael Arena (3,224); Chapel Hill, NC
02/26/2015; 7:00 pm		Miami (FL)	W 60–59	11–18 (2–13)	LJVM Coliseum (318); Winston-Salem, NC
02/28/2015; 2:00 pm		Georgia Tech	L 60–67	11–19 (2–14)	LJVM Coliseum (1,085); Winston-Salem, NC
2015 ACC Tournament
03/04/2015; 1:00 pm, RSN		vs. Boston College; First Round	W 69–53	12–19	Greensboro Coliseum (N/A); Greensboro, NC
03/05/2015; 11:00 am, RSN		vs. No. 22 Syracuse; Second Round	W 85–79	13–19	Greensboro Coliseum (9,384); Greensboro, NC
03/06/2015; 11:00 am, RSN		vs. No. 16 Duke; Quarterfinals	L 68–77	13–20	Greensboro Coliseum (11,007); Greensboro, NC
*Non-conference game. ^{#}Rankings from AP Poll. (#) Tournament seedings in parentheses. All times are in Eastern.

== Rankings ==
Regular season polls
Poll	Pre- season	Week 2	Week 3	Week 4	Week 5	Week 6	Week 7	Week 8	Week 9	Week 10	Week 11	Week 12	Week 13	Week 14	Week 15	Week 16	Week 17	Week 18	Final
AP	NR	NR	NR	NR	NR	NR	NR	NR	NR	NR	NR	NR	NR	NR	NR	NR	NR	NR	NR
Coaches	NR	NR	NR	NR	NR	NR	NR	NR	NR	NR	NR	NR	NR	NR	NR	NR	NR	NR	NR

Legend
	Increase in ranking
	Decrease in ranking
	No change
(RV)	Received votes
(NR)	Not ranked

== See also ==
- Wake Forest Demon Deacons women's basketball
