= 2014–15 Boston College Eagles women's basketball team =

Intercollegiate basketball season

2014–15 Boston College Eagles women's basketball
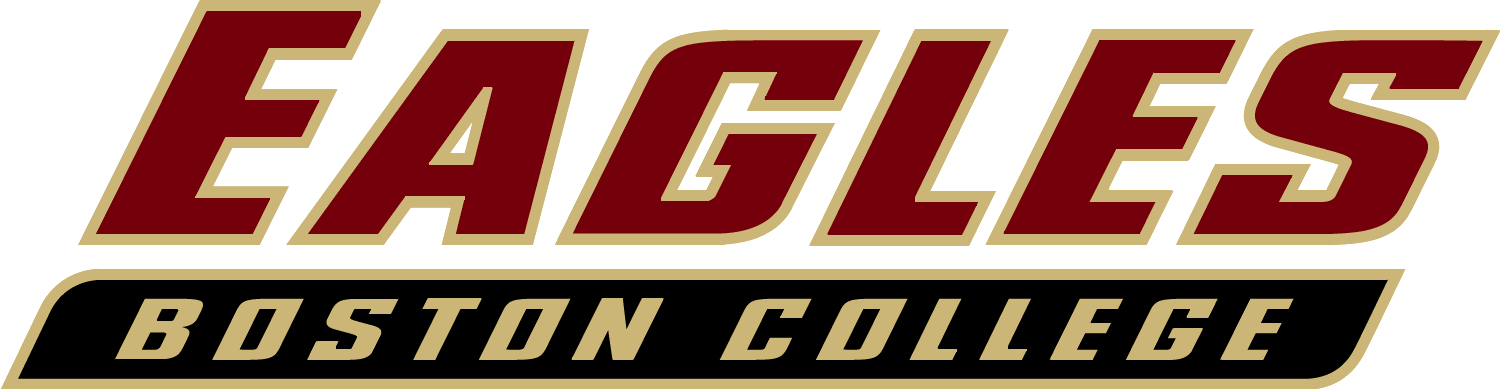
- Conference: Atlantic Coast Conference
- Record: 13–17 (5–11 ACC)
- Head coach: Erik Johnson (3rd season)
- Assistant coaches: Yvonne Hawkins (3rd season); Shelley Sheetz (3rd season); Lisa Faulkner (3rd season)
- Home arena: Conte Forum

2014–15 ACC women's basketball standings
| | Conf. | | | | Overall |
| Team | W | | L | PCT | W | | L | PCT |
|---|---|---|---|---|---|---|---|---|
| No. 2 Notre Dame^{†} | 15 | – | 1 | .938 | 36 | – | 3 | .923 |
| No. 7 Florida State | 14 | – | 2 | .875 | 32 | – | 5 | .865 |
| No. 8 Louisville | 12 | – | 4 | .750 | 27 | – | 7 | .794 |
| No. 16 Duke | 11 | – | 5 | .688 | 23 | – | 11 | .676 |
| Syracuse | 11 | – | 5 | .688 | 22 | – | 10 | .688 |
| No. 15 North Carolina | 10 | – | 6 | .625 | 26 | – | 9 | .743 |
| Pittsburgh | 9 | – | 7 | .563 | 20 | – | 12 | .625 |
| Miami (FL) | 8 | – | 8 | .500 | 20 | – | 13 | .606 |
| Virginia | 7 | – | 9 | .438 | 17 | – | 14 | .548 |
| NC State | 7 | – | 9 | .438 | 18 | – | 15 | .545 |
| Georgia Tech | 7 | – | 9 | .438 | 19 | – | 15 | .559 |
| Boston College | 5 | – | 11 | .313 | 13 | – | 17 | .433 |
| Wake Forest | 2 | – | 14 | .125 | 13 | – | 20 | .394 |
| Virginia Tech | 1 | – | 15 | .063 | 12 | – | 20 | .375 |
| Clemson | 1 | – | 15 | .063 | 9 | – | 21 | .300 |
† 2015 ACC tournament winner As of 7 April 2015; Rankings from AP poll

The 2014–15 Boston College Eagles women's basketball team represented Boston College during the 2014–15 college basketball season. Erik Johnson resumed the responsibility as head coach for a third consecutive season. The Eagles, members of the Atlantic Coast Conference, played their home games at the Conte Forum. They finished the season 13–17, 5–11 in ACC play to finish in twelfth place. They lost in the first round of the ACC women's tournament to Wake Forest.

== Before the season ==
=== Departures ===
| Name | Number | Pos. | Height | Year | Hometown | Notes |
|---|---|---|---|---|---|---|
| Amber Cooper | 5 | G | 6'4" | RS Freshman | New Orleans, Louisiana | |
| Kristen Doherty | 21 | G/F | 5'11" | Senior | Holtsville, New York | Graduated |
| Kami Mickens | 24 | G | 5'5" | Senior | Westlake, Texas | Graduated |
| Katie Zenevitch | 45 | F/C | 6'3" | Senior | Methuen, Massachusetts | Graduated |

== 2014–15 media ==
=== Boston College IMG Sports Network Affiliates ===
Select BC games, mostly home games and conference road games, will be broadcast on ZBC Sports. BC Game notes and stories will continue to be posted through their athletic website and on Twitter by following @bc_wbb.

== Roster ==
2014–15 Boston College Eagles women's basketball team
Players
Coaches

| Pos. | # | Name | Height | Year | Previous school | Hometown |
|---|---|---|---|---|---|---|
| G | 0 | Ashley Kelsick | 5 ft 7 in (1.7 m) | Fr | Highland | Palmdale, Cal. |
| G | 2 | Rachel Gartner | 5 ft 8 in (1.73 m) | Fr | Danbury | Danbury, Conn. |
| G/F | 10 | Ella Awobajo | 6 ft 0 in (1.83 m) | Fr | Neumann-Goretti | Kaduna, Nigeria |
| G | 11 | Nicole Boudreau | 5 ft 9 in (1.75 m) | Jr | Andover | Andover, Mass. |
| F | 13 | Alexa Coulombe | 6 ft 2 in (1.88 m) | Jr | Catherine McAuley | Falmouth, Maine |
| G/F | 14 | Kailey Edwards | 5 ft 9 in (1.75 m) | RS Jr | Denver | Broomfield, Col. |
| G | 15 | Lauren Engeln | 5 ft 11 in (1.8 m) | RS Sr | UConn | Laguna Hills, Calif. |
| G/F | 20 | Shayra Brown | 5 ft 9 in (1.75 m) | RS Sr | Bishop Ford | Brooklyn, N.Y. |
| G/F | 22 | Emilee Daley | 6 ft 1 in (1.85 m) | So | Rivers School | Sharon, Mass. |
| G | 23 | Kelly Hughes | 5 ft 11 in (1.8 m) | So | Point Pleasant Boro | Point Pleasant, NJ |
| F/C | 25 | Karima Gabriel | 6 ft 2 in (1.88 m) | RS Jr | DePaul | Manchester, NH |
| F | 32 | Victoria Lesko | 6 ft 2 in (1.88 m) | Sr | Rumson-Fair Haven | Rumson, N.J. |
| C | 42 | Katie Quandt | 6 ft 3 in (1.91 m) | Fr | Lakeville South | Lakeville, Minn. |
| G/F | 44 | Kat Cooper | 6 ft 0 in (1.83 m) | RS Jr | Auburn Riverside | Tacoma, Wash. |

Head coach

Erik Johnson (UC San Diego)

Assistant coach(es)

Yvonne Hawkins (Ashland)
Shelley Sheetz (Colorado)
Lisa Faulkner (Denver)

Legend

- (C) Team captain
- (S) Suspended
- (I) Ineligible
- (W) Walk-on
- Injured
- Current redshirt

Roster
Last update: 2014-07-01

== Schedule ==
| Date time, TV | Rank^{#} | Opponent^{#} | Result | Record | Site (attendance) city, state |
Regular Season
| 11/14/2014*; 8:30 pm | | at No. 6 Stanford | L 63–96 | 0–1 | Maples Pavilion (3,278); Stanford, CA |
| 11/16/2014*; 4:00 pm | | at Saint Mary's | W 82–72 | 1–1 | McKeon Pavilion (277); Moraga, CA |
| 11/20/2014*; 7:00 pm | | Boston University; Green Line Rivalry | W 73–56 | 2–1 | Conte Forum (673); Chestnut Hill, MA |
| 11/23/2014*; 1:00 pm | | Bryant | W 90–79 | 3–1 | Conte Forum (721); Chestnut Hill, MA |
| 11/28/2014*; 3:00 pm | | vs. Brown; Black Bear Thanksgiving Tournament | W 90–80 | 4–1 | Cross Insurance Center (358); Bangor, ME |
| 11/30/2014*; 1:00 pm | | at Maine; Black Bear Thanksgiving Tournament | L 64–69 ^{OT} | 4–2 | Cross Insurance Center (1,239); Bagor, ME |
| 12/03/2014*; 7:00 pm | | Indiana; ACC–Big Ten Women's Challenge | L 67–76 | 4–3 | Conte Forum (353); Chestnut Hill, MA |
| 12/07/2014*; 2:00 pm | | at Hartford | W 73–61 | 5–3 | Chase Arena at Reich Family Pavilion (1,585); Hartford, CT |
| 12/10/2014*; 7:00 pm | | at Holy Cross | L 63–80 | 5–4 | Hart Center (867); Worcester, MA |
| 12/14/2014*; 4:00 pm | | New Hampshire | W 64–58 | 6–4 | Conte Forum (588); Chestnut Hill, MA |
| 12/21/2014*; 12:00 pm | | Hofstra | L 61–75 | 6–5 | Conte Forum (531); Chestnut Hill, MA |
| 12/28/2014*; 1:00 pm | | Providence | W 79–51 | 7–5 | Conte Forum (847); Chestnut Hill, MA |
| 12/31/2014*; 1:00 pm | | Northeastern | W 66–56 | 8–5 | Conte Forum (721); Chestnut Hill, MA |
| 01/04/2015; 1:00 pm | | at Miami (FL) | L 53–74 | 8–6 (0–1) | BankUnited Center (1,095); Coral Gables, FL |
| 01/08/2015; 7:00 pm | | Georgia Tech | L 77–80 | 8–7 (0–2) | Conte Forum (479); Chestnut Hill, MA |
| 01/11/2015; 1:00 pm, ESPN3 | | at No. 4 Notre Dame | L 58–104 | 8–8 (0–3) | Edmund P. Joyce Center (9,149); South Bend, IN |
| 01/15/2015; 7:00 pm | | at Virginia | L 56–68 | 8–9 (0–4) | John Paul Jones Arena (3,397); Charlottesville, VA |
| 01/18/2015; 1:00 pm | | No. 25 Syracuse | L 46–64 | 8–10 (0–5) | Conte Forum (1,088); Chestnut Hill, MA |
| 01/22/2015; 7:00 pm | | No. 15 Duke | W 60–56 | 9–10 (1–5) | Conte Forum (1,309); Chestnut Hill, MA |
| 01/24/2015; 4:00 pm, RSN | | at Pittsburgh | L 70–78 | 9–11 (1–6) | Petersen Events Center (3,921); Pittsburgh, PA |
| 02/01/2015; 2:00 pm, ESPN3 | | at No. 16 North Carolina | L 60–72 | 9–12 (1–7) | Carmichael Arena (3,802); Chapel Hill, NC |
| 02/05/2015; 7:00 pm | | Clemson | W 68–53 | 10–12 (2–7) | Conte Forum (332); Chestnut Hill, MA |
| 02/08/2015; 1:00 pm | | No. 4 Notre Dame | L 56–89 | 10–13 (2–8) | Conte Forum (1,924); Chestnut Hill, MA |
| 02/12/2015; 7:00 pm | | at Wake Forest | W 75–74 | 11–13 (3–8) | LJVM Coliseum (342); Winston-Salem, NC |
| 02/16/2015; 5:30 pm | | NC State; Postponed from 2/15 | W 64–59 ^{OT} | 12–13 (4–8) | Conte Forum (527); Chestnut Hill, MA |
| 02/19/2015; 7:00 pm | | at No. 25 Syracuse | L 51–73 | 12–14 (4–9) | Carrier Dome (738); Syracuse, NY |
| 02/22/2015; 1:00 pm | | No. 9 Florida State | L 68–86 | 12–15 (4–10) | Conte Forum (912); Chestnut Hill, MA |
| 02/26/2015; 7:00 pm | | at No. 8 Louisville | L 60–77 | 12–16 (4–11) | KFC Yum! Center (10,488); Louisville, KY |
| 03/01/2015; 1:00 pm | | Virginia Tech | W 49–47 | 13–16 (5–11) | Conte Forum (1,183); Chestnut Hill, MA |
2015 ACC Tournament
| 03/04/2015; 1:00 pm, RSN | | vs. Wake Forest; First Round | L 53–69 | 13–17 | Greensboro Coliseum (N/A); Greensboro, NC |
*Non-conference game. ^{#}Rankings from AP Poll. (#) Tournament seedings in parentheses. All times are in Eastern.

== Rankings ==
2014–15 NCAA Division I women's basketball rankings

Regular season polls
| Poll | Pre- season | Week 2 | Week 3 | Week 4 | Week 5 | Week 6 | Week 7 | Week 8 | Week 9 | Week 10 | Week 11 | Week 12 | Week 13 | Week 14 | Week 15 | Week 16 | Week 17 | Week 18 | Final |
|---|---|---|---|---|---|---|---|---|---|---|---|---|---|---|---|---|---|---|---|
| AP | NR | NR | NR | NR | NR | NR | NR | NR | NR | NR | NR | NR | NR | NR | NR | NR | NR | NR | NR |
| Coaches | NR | NR | NR | NR | NR | NR | NR | NR | NR | NR | NR | NR | NR | NR | NR | NR | NR | NR | NR |

Legend
| | Increase in ranking |
| | Decrease in ranking |
| | No change |
| (RV) | Received votes |
| (NR) | Not ranked |

== See also ==
- Boston College Eagles women's basketball
