= 1997 America East men's basketball tournament =

- Classification: Division I
- Season: 1996–97
- Teams: 10
- Champions: Boston University (4th title)
- Winning coach: Dennis Wolff (1st title)
- MVP: Tunji Awojobi (Boston U.)

1996–97 America East Conference men's basketball standings
	Conf.				Overall
Team	W		L	PCT	W		L	PCT
Boston University †	17	–	1	.944	25	–	5	.833
Drexel	16	–	2	.889	22	–	9	.710
Hartford	11	–	7	.611	17	–	11	.607
Hofstra	9	–	9	.500	12	–	15	.444
Delaware	9	–	9	.500	12	–	15	.444
Vermont	7	–	11	.389	14	–	13	.519
Northeastern	6	–	12	.333	7	–	20	.259
Maine	6	–	12	.333	11	–	20	.355
New Hampshire	5	–	13	.278	7	–	20	.259
Towson State	5	–	13	.278	9	–	19	.321
† 1997 America East tournament winner Rankings from AP poll

The 1997 America East men's basketball tournament was hosted by the Delaware Blue Hens at Bob Carpenter Center . The final was held at Case Gym on the campus of Boston University. Boston University gained its fourth overall America East Conference Championship and an automatic berth to the NCAA tournament with its win over Drexel. Boston University was given the 12th seed in the Midwest Regional of the NCAA Tournament and lost in the first round to Tulsa 81–52. Drexel University gained a bid to the NIT and lost in the first round to Bradley 66–53.

== Bracket and Results ==
First round
8	Maine	76
9	New Hampshire	47
7	Northeastern	62
10	Towson State	79

Second round
1	Boston U.	67
8	Maine	49
4	Hofstra	73
5	Delaware	86
2	Drexel	78
10	Towson State	75
3	Hartford	70
6	Vermont	44

Semifinals
1	Boston U.	69
5	Delaware	65
2	Drexel	75
3	Hartford	69

Finals
1	Boston U.	68
2	Drexel	61

== See also ==
- America East Conference
