= 2014–15 Syracuse Orange women's basketball team =

Intercollegiate basketball season

2014–15 Syracuse Orange women's basketball

NCAA tournament, second round
- Conference: Atlantic Coast Conference
- Record: 22–10 (11–5 ACC)
- Head coach: Quentin Hillsman (8th season)
- Assistant coaches: Vonn Read (4th season); Kelley Gibson (5th season); Sasha Palmer (2nd season)
- Home arena: Carrier Dome

2014–15 ACC women's basketball standings
	Conf.				Overall
Team	W		L	PCT	W		L	PCT
No. 2 Notre Dame^{†}	15	–	1	.938	36	–	3	.923
No. 7 Florida State	14	–	2	.875	32	–	5	.865
No. 8 Louisville	12	–	4	.750	27	–	7	.794
No. 16 Duke	11	–	5	.688	23	–	11	.676
Syracuse	11	–	5	.688	22	–	10	.688
No. 15 North Carolina	10	–	6	.625	26	–	9	.743
Pittsburgh	9	–	7	.563	20	–	12	.625
Miami (FL)	8	–	8	.500	20	–	13	.606
Virginia	7	–	9	.438	17	–	14	.548
NC State	7	–	9	.438	18	–	15	.545
Georgia Tech	7	–	9	.438	19	–	15	.559
Boston College	5	–	11	.313	13	–	17	.433
Wake Forest	2	–	14	.125	13	–	20	.394
Virginia Tech	1	–	15	.063	12	–	20	.375
Clemson	1	–	15	.063	9	–	21	.300
† 2015 ACC tournament winner As of 7 April 2015; Rankings from AP poll

The 2014–15 Syracuse Orange women's basketball team represented Syracuse University during the 2014–15 college basketball season. Quentin Hillsman resumed responsibility as head coach for an eighth consecutive season. The Orange were second-year members of the Atlantic Coast Conference and played their home games at the Carrier Dome. They finished the season 22–10, 11–5 in ACC play to finish in a tie for fourth place. They lost in the second round of the ACC women's tournament to Wake Forest. They received an at-large bid to the NCAA women's tournament, where they defeated Nebraska in the first round before losing to South Carolina in the second round.

== 2014–15 media ==
=== Syracuse IMG Sports Network ===
The Syracuse Orange IMG Sports Network broadcast all Orange games on WTLA ESPN Radio 97.7/100.1 FM & 1200 AM, with Brian Higgins on the call. The games also were streamed online at Cuse.com.

== 2014–15 roster ==
2014–15 Syracuse Orange women's basketball team
Players
Coaches

Pos.	#	Name	Height	Year	Previous school	Hometown
G	0	Diamond Henderson	5 ft 6 in (1.68 m)	Sr	St. Francis	Kennesaw, Ga.
G	1	Alexis Peterson	5 ft 7 in (1.7 m)	So	Northland	Columbus, Ohio
G	4	Maggie Morrison	5 ft 8 in (1.73 m)	Sr	Archbishop Spalding	Millersville, Md.
F	10	Isabella Slim	6 ft 0 in (1.83 m)	So	CTO Amsterdam	Amsterdam, Netherlands
G	11	Cornelia Fondren	5 ft 8 in (1.73 m)	Jr	Overton	Memphis, Tenn.
G	13	Brianna Butler	5 ft 11 in (1.8 m)	Jr	Nazareth Regional (N.Y.)	King of Prussia, Pa.
G	20	Brittney Sykes	5 ft 9 in (1.75 m)	Jr	University	Newark, N.J.
G	21	Danielle Minott	5 ft 8 in (1.73 m)	Fr	Miami Country Day	Miami, Fla.
F	22	Taylor Ford	6 ft 0 in (1.83 m)	Jr	Nazareth Regional	Bronx, N.Y.
C	25	Michelle Van Dyke	6 ft 6 in (1.98 m)	So	Eastern Christian	Franklin Lakes, N.J.
G	32	Tiara Butler	5 ft 10 in (1.78 m)	RS Sr	North Point	Waldorf, Md.
C	44	Amber Witherspoon	6 ft 4 in (1.93 m)	Fr	Lincoln Park	Chicago, Ill.
C	50	Briana Day	6 ft 4 in (1.93 m)	So	Millbrook	Raleigh, N.C.
F	55	Bria Day	6 ft 4 in (1.93 m)	So	Millbrook	Raleigh, N.C.

Head coach

Quentin Hillsman

Assistant coach(es)

Vonn Read
Kelley Gibson
Sasha Palmer

Legend

- (C) Team captain
- (S) Suspended
- (I) Ineligible
- (W) Walk-on
- Injured
- Current redshirt

Roster
Last update: 2014-09-13

== Schedule ==
Date time, TV	Rank^{#}	Opponent^{#}	Result	Record	Site (attendance) city, state
Regular season
11/16/2014*; 12:00 pm	No. 24	Fordham	W 59–42	1–0	Carrier Dome (N/A); Syracuse, NY
11/19/2014*; 7:00 pm	No. 23	at Duquesne	W 90–84	2–0	Palumbo Center (732); Pittsburgh, PA
11/22/2014*; 3:00 pm	No. 23	at Jacksonville	W 76–61	3–0	Swisher Gymnasium (576); Jacksonville, FL
11/27/2014*; 2:00 pm	No. 22	vs. East Carolina; Junkanoo Jam Lucaya Division semifinals	W 69–58	4–0	St. Georges High School (150); Grand Bahama Island
11/28/2014*; 8:00 pm	No. 22	vs. No. 1 South Carolina; Junkanoo Jam Lucaya Division championship	L 63–67	4–1	St. Georges High School (342); Grand Bahama Island
12/01/2014*; 7:00 pm, TWCSC	No. 21	Vermont	W 94–63	5–1	Carrier Dome (357); Syracuse, NY
12/04/2014*; 7:00 pm	No. 21	Penn State; ACC–Big Ten Women's Challenge	W 61–39	6–1	Carrier Dome (258); Syracuse, NY
12/14/2014*; 12:00 pm	No. 20	North Carolina Central	W 74–25	7–1	Carrier Dome (447); Syracuse, NY
12/16/2014*; 7:00 pm, TWCSC	No. 19	Canisius	W 70–37	8–1	Carrier Dome (393); Syracuse, NY
12/19/2014*; 7:00 pm	No. 19	vs. No. 9 Baylor; Florida Sunshine Tournament	L 72–74	8–2	Worden Arena (889); Winter Haven, FL
12/21/2014*; 4:00 pm	No. 19	vs. No. 18 Michigan State; Florida Sunshine Tournament	L 76–89	8–3	Worden Arena (502); Winter Haven, FL
12/28/2014*; 6:00 pm	No. 22	Cornell	W 76–59	9–3	Carrier Dome (649); Syracuse, NY
12/30/2014*; 7:00 pm	No. 21	Central Connecticut	W 74–43	10–3	Carrier Dome (508); Syracuse, NY
01/04/2015; 1:00 pm, RSN	No. 21	No. 4 Notre Dame	L 74–85	10–4 (0–1)	Carrier Dome (2,158); Syracuse, NY
01/08/2015; 6:30 pm, ESPN3	No. 21	at No. 13 Duke	L 72–74	10–5 (0–2)	Cameron Indoor Stadium (3,899); Durham, NC
01/11/2015; 1:00 pm	No. 21	Virginia	W 70–58	11–5 (1–2)	Carrier Dome (708); Syracuse, NY
01/15/2015; 7:00 pm, TWCSC	No. 25	Wake Forest	W 73–62	12–5 (2–2)	Carrier Dome (364); Syracuse, NY
01/18/2015; 1:00 pm	No. 25	at Boston College	W 64–46	13–5 (3–2)	Conte Forum (1,088); Chestnut Hill, MA
01/22/2015; 7:00 pm	No. 23	at Pittsburgh	W 68–60	14–5 (4–2)	Peterson Events Center (1,003); Pittsburgh, PA
01/25/2015; 3:00 pm, RSN	No. 23	NC State	W 66–49	15–5 (5–2)	Carrier Dome (1,300); Syracuse, NY
01/29/2015; 7:00 pm	No. 23	at No. 8 Louisville	L 58–78	15–6 (5–3)	KFC Yum! Center (8,387); Louisville, KY
02/02/2015; 7:00 pm, RSN	No. 25	at No. 9 Florida State	L 52–62	15–7 (5–4)	Donald L. Tucker Civic Center (2,758); Tallahassee, FL
02/05/2015; 7:00 pm, TWCSC	No. 25	No. 13 North Carolina	W 61–56	16–7 (6–4)	Carrier Dome (564); Syracuse, NY
02/08/2015; 2:00 pm	No. 25	at Georgia Tech	W 65–60	17–7 (7–4)	Hank McCamish Pavilion (1,622); Atlanta, GA
02/12/2015; 7:00 pm	No. 23	Miami (FL)	L 71–85	17–8 (7–5)	Carrier Dome (435); Syracuse, NY
02/15/2015; 2:00 pm	No. 23	at Virginia Tech	W 59–51	18–8 (8–5)	Cassell Coliseum (1,702); Blacksburg, VA
02/19/2015; 7:00 pm	No. 25	Boston College	W 73–51	19–8 (9–5)	Carrier Dome (738); Syracuse, NY
02/22/2015; 12:00 pm, TWCSC	No. 25	Pittsburgh	W 68–54	20–8 (10–5)	Carrier Dome (1,226); Syracuse, NY
02/26/2015; 7:00 pm	No. 23	at Clemson	W 60–55	21–8 (11–5)	Littlejohn Coliseum (454); Clemson, SC
2015 ACC Tournament
03/05/2015; 11:00 am, RSN	No. 22	vs. Wake Forest; Second Round	L 79–85	21–9	Greensboro Coliseum (9,384); Greensboro, NC
NCAA Women's Tournament
03/20/2015*; 7:36 pm, ESPN2		vs. Nebraska; First Round	W 72–69	22–9	Colonial Life Arena (10,644); Columbia, SC
03/22/2015*; 7:00 pm, ESPN		at No. 3 South Carolina; Second Round	L 68–97	22–10	Colonial Life Arena (10,485); Columbia, SC
*Non-conference game. ^{#}Rankings from AP Poll. (#) Tournament seedings in parentheses. All times are in Eastern.

== Rankings ==
Regular season polls
Poll	Pre- season	Week 2	Week 3	Week 4	Week 5	Week 6	Week 7	Week 8	Week 9	Week 10	Week 11	Week 12	Week 13	Week 14	Week 15	Week 16	Week 17	Week 18	Final
AP	24т	23	22т	21	20т	19т	22	21	21	25	23	23	25	23	25	23	22	RV	RV
Coaches	25	22	23	22	22	22	23	22	21	24	22	22	25	22	RV	RV	24	RV	RV

Legend
	Increase in ranking
	Decrease in ranking
	No change
(RV)	Received votes
(NR)	Not ranked

== See also ==
- Syracuse Orange women's basketball
- 2014–15 Syracuse Orange men's basketball team
