= 2014–15 Vanderbilt Commodores women's basketball team =

Intercollegiate basketball season

2014–15 Vanderbilt Commodores women's basketball
- Conference: Southeastern Conference
- Record: 15–16 (5–11 SEC)
- Head coach: Melanie Balcomb (13th season)
- Assistant coaches: Tom Garrick; Kim Rosamond; Ashley Earley
- Home arena: Memorial Gymnasium

2014–15 SEC women's basketball standings
| | Conf. | | | | Overall |
| Team | W | | L | PCT | W | | L | PCT |
|---|---|---|---|---|---|---|---|---|
| No. 3 South Carolina*^{†} | 15 | – | 1 | .938 | 34 | – | 3 | .919 |
| No. 6 Tennessee | 15 | – | 1 | .938 | 30 | – | 6 | .833 |
| No. 12 Mississippi State | 11 | – | 5 | .688 | 27 | – | 7 | .794 |
| No. 11 Kentucky | 10 | – | 6 | .625 | 24 | – | 10 | .706 |
| No. 21 Texas A&M | 10 | – | 6 | .625 | 23 | – | 10 | .697 |
| LSU | 10 | – | 6 | .625 | 17 | – | 14 | .548 |
| Missouri | 7 | – | 9 | .438 | 19 | – | 14 | .576 |
| Ole Miss | 7 | – | 9 | .438 | 19 | – | 14 | .576 |
| Georgia | 6 | – | 10 | .375 | 19 | – | 12 | .613 |
| Arkansas | 6 | – | 10 | .375 | 18 | – | 14 | .563 |
| Vanderbilt | 5 | – | 11 | .313 | 15 | – | 16 | .484 |
| Florida | 5 | – | 11 | .313 | 13 | – | 17 | .433 |
| Auburn | 3 | – | 13 | .188 | 13 | – | 18 | .419 |
| Alabama | 2 | – | 14 | .125 | 13 | – | 19 | .406 |
† 2015 SEC tournament winner Rankings from AP poll

The 2014–15 Vanderbilt Commodores women's basketball team represented Vanderbilt University in the 2014–15 college basketball season. The team's head coach was Melanie Balcomb, in her thirteenth season at Vanderbilt. The team played their home games at Memorial Gymnasium in Nashville, Tennessee, as a member of the Southeastern Conference. They finished the season 15–16, 5–11 in SEC play to finish in a tie for eleventh place. They advanced to the second round of the SEC women's tournament, where they lost to Kentucky.

== Roster ==
2014–15 Vanderbilt Commodores women's basketball team
Players
Coaches

| Pos. | # | Name | Height | Year | Previous school | Hometown |
|---|---|---|---|---|---|---|
| G | 1 | Rebekah Dahlman | 5 ft 9 in (1.75 m) | RS Fr | Braham Area | Braham, Minn. |
| G | 3 | Rachel Bell | 5 ft 10 in (1.78 m) | Fr | Creek Wood | Cumberland Furnace, Tenn. |
| F | 10 | Khaléann Caron-Goudreau | 6 ft 3 in (1.91 m) | Fr | IMG Academy (Fla.) | Gatineau, Quebec |
| F | 13 | Audrey-Ann Caron-Goudreau | 6 ft 3 in (1.91 m) | Fr | IMG Academy (Fla.) | Gatineau, Quebec |
| G | 15 | Jasmine Jenkins | 5 ft 8 in (1.73 m) | Jr | East Hall | Gainesville, Ga. |
| F | 21 | Heather Bowe | 6 ft 0 in (1.83 m) | Jr | Regis | Eau Claire, Wis. |
| F | 22 | Marqu'es Webb | 6 ft 1 in (1.85 m) | So | Hoover | Hoover, Ala. |
| F | 24 | Kristen Gaffney | 6 ft 1 in (1.85 m) | RS So | Green Hope | Cary, N.C. |
| G | 25 | Morgan Batey | 5 ft 10 in (1.78 m) | Jr | Pace Academy | Atlanta, Ga. |
| G | 33 | Christa Reed | 5 ft 11 in (1.8 m) | Fr | Bay | Bay St. Louis, Miss. |
| C | 35 | Kendall Shaw | 6 ft 4 in (1.93 m) | RS So | Barbers Hill | Mont Belvieu, Texas |
| G | 41 | Paris Kea | 5 ft 8 in (1.73 m) | Fr | Page | Greensboro, N.C. |
| F | 44 | Rayte'a Long | 6 ft 0 in (1.83 m) | So | Chaminade | Dayton, Ohio |

Head coach

Melanie Balcomb

Assistant coach(es)

Tom Garrick
Kim Rosamond
Ashley Earley

Legend

- (C) Team captain
- (S) Suspended
- (I) Ineligible
- (W) Walk-on
- Injured
- Current redshirt

Roster
Last update: 2013-08-16

== Schedule ==
| Date time, TV | Rank^{#} | Opponent^{#} | Result | Record | Site (attendance) city, state |
Exhibition
| Nov 8, 2014*; Noon | | Coker | W 93–31 | – | Memorial Gymnasium (3,585); Nashville, TN |
Non-conference regular season
| Nov 14, 2014*; 7:00 p.m. | | Belmont | W 65–58 | 1–0 | Memorial Gymnasium (2,909); Nashville, TN |
| Nov 17, 2014*; 7:00 p.m. | | Green Bay | W 68–64 ^{OT} | 2–0 | Memorial Gymnasium (2,557); Nashville, TN |
| Nov 20, 2014*; 7:00 p.m. | | at Wisconsin | W 67–58 | 3–0 | Kohl Center (3,168); Madison, WI |
| Nov 24, 2014*; 11:30 a.m. | | Saint Louis | W 75–57 | 4–0 | Memorial Gymnasium (6,598); Nashville, TN |
| Nov 28, 2014*; 5:00 p.m. | | vs. Minnesota; Gulf Coast Showcase Quarterfinals | W 71–54 | 5–0 | Germain Arena (N/A); Estero, FL |
| Nov 29, 2014*; 7:30 p.m., ESPN3 | | vs. No. 3 Connecticut; Gulf Coast Showcase Semifinals | L 52–91 | 5–1 | Germain Arena (3,177); Estero, FL |
| Nov 30, 2014*; 5:00 p.m. | | vs. Arizona State; Gulf Coast Showcase 3rd place game | L 67–72 | 5–2 | Germain Arena (N/A); Estero, FL |
| Dec 3, 2014*; 7:00 p.m. | | Mississippi Valley State | W 63–37 | 6–2 | Memorial Gymnasium (2,602); Nashville, TN |
| Dec 14, 2014*; 1:00 p.m. | | at Elon | W 66–50 | 7–2 | Alumni Gym (838); Elon, NC |
| Dec 18, 2014*; 11:30 a.m. | | at Marquette | L 67–80 | 7–3 | Al McGuire Center (3,585); Milwaukee, WI |
| Dec 21, 2014*; 2:00 p.m. | | Dayton | L 67–71 | 7–4 | Memorial Gymnasium (2,910); Nashville, TN |
| Dec 29, 2014*; 7:00 p.m. | | James Madison | W 66–62 | 8–4 | Memorial Gymnasium (2,965); Nashville, TN |
SEC regular season
| Jan 2, 2015; 7:00 p.m. | | at No. 5 Texas A&M | L 61–75 | 8–5 (0–1) | Reed Arena (4,513); College Station, TX |
| Jan 5, 2015; 6:00 p.m., SECN | | No. 7 Tennessee; Rivalry | L 49–57 | 8–6 (0–2) | Memorial Gymnasium (7,212); Nashville, TN |
| Jan 8, 2015; 8:00 p.m., SECN | | at LSU | L 44–64 | 8–7 (0–3) | Maravich Center (2,131); Baton Rouge, LA |
| Jan 11, 2015; 2:00 p.m. | | No. 14 Mississippi State | W 78–62 | 9–7 (1–3) | Memorial Gymnasium (3,690); Nashville, TN |
| Jan 15, 2015*; 7:00 p.m. | | Alabama–Huntsville | W 74–51 | 10–7 | Memorial Gymnasium (2,626); Nashville, TN |
| Jan 18, 2015; 11:00 a.m., FSN | | at No. 18 Georgia | L 53–64 | 10–8 (1–4) | Stegeman Coliseum (4,401); Athens, GA |
| Jan 22, 2015; 7:00 p.m. | | Arkansas | W 55–53 | 11–8 (2–4) | Memorial Gymnasium (2,685); Nashville, TN |
| Jan 25, 2015; 2:00 p.m., FSN | | at Alabama | W 55–52 | 12–8 (3–4) | Foster Auditorium (2,628); Tuscaloosa, AL |
| Jan 29, 2015; 7:00 p.m. | | at No. 18 Mississippi State | L 44–69 | 12–9 (3–5) | Humphrey Coliseum (5,056); Starkville, MS |
| Feb 1, 2015; 3:00 p.m., FSN | | Florida | L 58–67 | 12–10 (3–6) | Memorial Gymnasium (3,262); Nashville, TN |
| Feb 5, 2015; 7:00 p.m. | | Ole Miss | W 58–54 | 13–10 (4–6) | Memorial Gymnasium (2,785); Nashville, TN |
| Feb 8, 2015; Noon, SECN | | No. 11 Kentucky | L 68–82 | 13–11 (4–7) | Memorial Gymnasium (4,235); Nashville, TN |
| Feb 15, 2015; 11:00 a.m., ESPNU | | at No. 1 South Carolina | L 59–89 | 13–12 (4–8) | Colonial Life Arena (15,255); Columbia, SC |
| Feb 19, 2015; 6:00 p.m., SECN | | at Florida | W 76–75 ^{OT} | 14–12 (5–8) | O'Connell Center (1,134); Gainesville, FL |
| Feb 22, 2015; 1:00 p.m., SECN | | Missouri | L 51–54 | 14–13 (5–9) | Memorial Gymnasium (3,314); Nashville, TN |
| Feb 26, 2015; 8:00 p.m., FSN | | Auburn | L 58–70 | 14–14 (5–10) | Memorial Gymnasium (2,930); Nashville, TN |
| Mar 1, 2015; 4:00 p.m., SECN | | at No. 6 Tennessee; Rivalry | L 49–79 | 14–15 (5–11) | Thompson–Boling Arena (13,027); Knoxville, TN |
2015 SEC Tournament
| Mar 4, 2015; 6:30 p.m., SECN | | vs. Alabama; First Round | W 66–56 | 15–15 | Verizon Arena (1,915); North Little Rock, AR |
| Mar 5, 2015; 7:30 p.m., SECN | | vs. No. 12 Kentucky; Second Round | L 61–67 | 15–16 | Verizon Arena (1,622); North Little Rock, AR |
*Non-conference game. ^{#}Rankings from AP Poll. (#) Tournament seedings in parentheses. All times are in Central Time.

== Rankings ==
Ranking movement Legend: ██ Increase in ranking. ██ Decrease in ranking. NR = Not ranked. RV = Received votes.
| Poll | Pre | Wk 2 | Wk 3 | Wk 4 | Wk 5 | Wk 6 | Wk 7 | Wk 8 | Wk 9 | Wk 10 | Wk 11 | Wk 12 | Wk 13 | Wk 14 | Wk 15 | Wk 16 | Wk 17 | Wk 18 | Final |
|---|---|---|---|---|---|---|---|---|---|---|---|---|---|---|---|---|---|---|---|
| AP | RV | RV | RV | NR | NR | NR | NR | NR | NR | NR | NR | NR | NR | NR | NR | NR | NR | NR | NR |
| Coaches | RV | RV | RV | RV | NR | NR | NR | NR | NR | NR | NR | NR | NR | NR | NR | NR | NR | NR | NR |

== See also ==
- 2014–15 Vanderbilt Commodores men's basketball team
