= 2014–15 Auburn Tigers women's basketball team =

Intercollegiate basketball season

2014–15 Auburn Tigers women's basketball
- Conference: Southeastern Conference
- Record: 13–18 (3–13 SEC)
- Head coach: Terri Williams-Flournoy (3rd season)
- Assistant coaches: Ty Evans; Adrian Walters; Sherill Baker
- Home arena: Auburn Arena

2014–15 SEC women's basketball standings
| | Conf. | | | | Overall |
| Team | W | | L | PCT | W | | L | PCT |
|---|---|---|---|---|---|---|---|---|
| No. 3 South Carolina*^{†} | 15 | – | 1 | .938 | 34 | – | 3 | .919 |
| No. 6 Tennessee | 15 | – | 1 | .938 | 30 | – | 6 | .833 |
| No. 12 Mississippi State | 11 | – | 5 | .688 | 27 | – | 7 | .794 |
| No. 11 Kentucky | 10 | – | 6 | .625 | 24 | – | 10 | .706 |
| No. 21 Texas A&M | 10 | – | 6 | .625 | 23 | – | 10 | .697 |
| LSU | 10 | – | 6 | .625 | 17 | – | 14 | .548 |
| Missouri | 7 | – | 9 | .438 | 19 | – | 14 | .576 |
| Ole Miss | 7 | – | 9 | .438 | 19 | – | 14 | .576 |
| Georgia | 6 | – | 10 | .375 | 19 | – | 12 | .613 |
| Arkansas | 6 | – | 10 | .375 | 18 | – | 14 | .563 |
| Vanderbilt | 5 | – | 11 | .313 | 15 | – | 16 | .484 |
| Florida | 5 | – | 11 | .313 | 13 | – | 17 | .433 |
| Auburn | 3 | – | 13 | .188 | 13 | – | 18 | .419 |
| Alabama | 2 | – | 14 | .125 | 13 | – | 19 | .406 |
† 2015 SEC tournament winner Rankings from AP poll

The 2014–15 Auburn Tigers women's basketball team represented Auburn University during the 2014–15 NCAA Division I women's basketball season. The Tigers, led by third-year head coach Terri Williams-Flournoy, played their home games at Auburn Arena and were members of the Southeastern Conference. They finished the season 12–17, 3–13 in SEC play to finish in thirteenth place. They advanced to the second round of the SEC women's tournament, where they lost Texas A&M.

== Roster ==
2014–15 Auburn Tigers women's basketball team
Players
Coaches

| Pos. | # | Name | Height | Year | Previous school | Hometown |
|---|---|---|---|---|---|---|
| G | 00 | Hasina Muhammad | 6 ft 1 in (1.85 m) | Sr | Ridgeway | Memphis, Tenn. |
| G | 2 | Bria Johnson | 5 ft 8 in (1.73 m) | Fr | Episcopal | Baton Rouge, La. |
| G | 3 | Allina Starr | 5 ft 10 in (1.78 m) | So | De LaSalle | Minneapolis, Minn. |
| G | 10 | Brandy Montgomery | 5 ft 10 in (1.78 m) | So | Lincoln Park Academy | Port St. Lucie, Fla. |
| G/F | 13 | Katie Frerking | 6 ft 1 in (1.85 m) | So | Wesleyan School | Johns Creek, Ga. |
| F | 15 | Jazmine Jones | 6 ft 2 in (1.88 m) | Fr | West Forsyth | Winston-Salem, N.C. |
| G | 22 | Kiani Parker | 5 ft 9 in (1.75 m) | Sr | NW Fla. State College | Ft. Walton Beach, Fla. |
| G | 23 | Jessica Jones | 6 ft 2 in (1.88 m) | Fr | West Forsyth | Winston-Salem, N.C. |
| G | 25 | Neydja Petithomme | 5 ft 8 in (1.73 m) | Fr | Grandview Prep | Boca Raton, Fla. |
| F | 35 | Asia Robeson | 6 ft 4 in (1.93 m) | Fr | Kalamazoo Central | Kalamazoo, Mich. |
| G | 40 | Ndeye Dieng | 5 ft 10 in (1.78 m) | So | Gatewood (Ga.) School | Dakar, Senegal |
| F/C | 44 | Tra'Cee Tanner | 6 ft 3 in (1.91 m) | Jr | Hoover | Birmingham, Ala. |
| F | 50 | Cabriana Capers | 6 ft 1 in (1.85 m) | Jr | Bolingbrook | Bolingbrook, Ill. |

Head coach

Terri Williams-Flournoy

Assistant coach(es)

Ty Evans
Adrian Walters
Sherill Baker

Legend

- (C) Team captain
- (S) Suspended
- (I) Ineligible
- (W) Walk-on
- Injured
- Current redshirt

Roster
Last update: 2014-09-27

== Schedule ==
| Date time, TV | Rank^{#} | Opponent^{#} | Result | Record | Site (attendance) city, state |
Non-conference regular season
| Nov 14, 2014*; 6:00 p.m. | | Troy | W 71–54 | 1–0 | Auburn Arena (1,777); Auburn, AL |
| Nov 17, 2014*; 6:00 p.m. | | Grambling State | W 92–42 | 2–0 | Auburn Arena (1,376); Auburn, AL |
| Nov 20, 2014*; 6:00 p.m. | | Florida Gulf Coast | W 72–69 | 3–0 | Auburn Arena (1,534); Auburn, AL |
| Nov 23, 2014*; 1:00 p.m. | | at Virginia | L 51–66 | 3–1 | John Paul Jones Arena (3,526); Charlottesville, VA |
| Nov 29, 2014*; Noon | | at Winthrop | L 54–56 | 3–2 | Winthrop Coliseum (329); Rock Hill, SC |
| Dec 2, 2014*; 6:00 p.m. | | Marquette | W 79–53 | 4–2 | Auburn Arena (2,590); Auburn, AL |
| Dec 4, 2014*; 6:00 p.m. | | Southeastern Louisiana | W 72–44 | 5–2 | Auburn Arena (1,469); Auburn, AL |
| Dec 14, 2014*; 2:00 p.m. | | Samford | W 64–41 | 6–2 | Auburn Arena (1,658); Auburn, AL |
| Dec 17, 2014*; 5:30 p.m. | | Savannah State | W 62–56 | 7–2 | Auburn Arena (1,623); Auburn, AL |
| Dec 20, 2014*; 11:00 a.m., ESPN3 | | at St. John's; St. John's Invitational semifinals | L 49–56 | 7–3 | Carnesecca Arena (N/A); Queens, NY |
| Dec 21, 2014*; 11:00 a.m., ESPN3 | | vs. SMU; St. John's Invitational 3rd place game | W 56–43 | 8–3 | Carnesecca Arena (N/A); Queens, NY |
| Dec 29, 2014*; 5:00 p.m. | | at FIU; FIU Fun & Sun Classic semifinals | W 81–44 | 9–3 | FIU Arena (352); Miami, FL |
| Dec 30, 2014*; 2:30 p.m. | | vs. Hampton; FIU Fun & Sun Classic championship | L 42–44 | 9–4 | FIU Arena (N/A); Miami, FL |
SEC regular season
| Jan 2, 2015; 6:00 p.m. | | at No. 1 South Carolina | L 58–77 | 9–5 (0–1) | Colonial Life Arena (16,465); Columbia, SC |
| Jan 4, 2015; 3:00 p.m., SECN | | Florida | L 50–63 | 9–6 (0–2) | Auburn Arena (1,990); Auburn, AL |
| Jan 8, 2015; 6:00 p.m. | | at No. 10 Kentucky | L 57–78 | 9–7 (0–3) | Memorial Coliseum (4,587); Lexington, KY |
| Jan 11, 2015; 1:00 p.m., SECN | | No. 20 Georgia | L 52–57 | 9–8 (0–4) | Auburn Arena (2,751); Auburn, AL |
| Jan 15, 2015; 7:00 p.m., FSN | | No. 6 Tennessee | L 42–54 | 9–9 (0–5) | Auburn Arena (2,590); Auburn, AL |
| Jan 22, 2015; 8:00 p.m., FSN | | at Alabama | L 50–51 | 9–10 (0–6) | Foster Auditorium (2,506); Tuscaloosa, AL |
| Jan 26, 2015; 8:00 p.m., SECN | | No. 18 Mississippi State | L 48–59 | 9–11 (0–7) | Auburn Arena (1,787); Auburn, AL |
| Jan 29, 2015; 7:00 p.m. | | at Arkansas | L 47–52 | 9–12 (0–8) | Bud Walton Arena (1,474); Fayetteville, AR |
| Feb 1, 2015; 2:00 p.m. | | at No. 12 Texas A&M | L 45–78 | 9–13 (0–9) | Reed Arena (4,086); College Station, TX |
| Feb 5, 2015; 6:00 p.m., FSN | | LSU | L 49–60 | 9–14 (0–10) | Auburn Arena (1,899); Auburn, AL |
| Jan 8, 2015; 2:00 p.m. | | at Missouri | L 49–59 | 9–15 (0–11) | Mizzou Arena (2,614); Columbia, MO |
| Feb 15, 2015; 1:00 p.m., SECN | | Arkansas | L 36–54 | 9–16 (0–12) | Auburn Arena (2,270); Auburn, AL |
| Feb 19, 2015; 8:00 p.m., FSN | | Ole Miss | L 46–51 | 9–17 (0–13) | Auburn Arena (1,790); Auburn, AL |
| Feb 22, 2015; 1:00 p.m. | | at Georgia | W 44–26 | 10–17 (1–13) | Stegeman Coliseum (4,855); Athens, GA |
| Feb 26, 2015; 8:00 p.m., FSN | | at Vanderbilt | W 70–58 | 11–17 (2–13) | Memorial Gymnasium (2,930); Nashville, TN |
| Mar 1, 2015; 2:00 p.m. | | Alabama | W 80–73 | 12–17 (3–13) | Auburn Arena (3,721); Auburn, AL |
SEC Women's Tournament
| Mar 4, 2015; 4:00 p.m., SECN | | vs. Florida; First Round | W 71–49 | 13–17 | Verizon Center (1,915); North Little Rock, AR |
| Mar 5, 2015; 2:30 p.m., SECN | | vs. No. 18 Texas A&M; Second Round | L 47–57 | 13–18 | Verizon Center (N/A); North Little Rock, AR |
*Non-conference game. ^{#}Rankings from AP Poll. (#) Tournament seedings in parentheses. All times are in Central Time.

== See also ==
- 2014–15 Auburn Tigers men's basketball team
