= 2015 SEC women's basketball tournament =

- Classification: Division I
- Season: 2014–15
- Teams: 14
- Site: Verizon Arena; North Little Rock, AR
- Champions: South Carolina (1st title)
- Winning coach: Dawn Staley (1st title)
- MVP: Aleighsa Welch (South Carolina)
- Attendance: 25,821
- Television: SEC Network, ESPN, ESPNU

2014–15 SEC women's basketball standings
	Conf.				Overall
Team	W		L	PCT	W		L	PCT
No. 3 South Carolina*^{†}	15	–	1	.938	34	–	3	.919
No. 6 Tennessee	15	–	1	.938	30	–	6	.833
No. 12 Mississippi State	11	–	5	.688	27	–	7	.794
No. 11 Kentucky	10	–	6	.625	24	–	10	.706
No. 21 Texas A&M	10	–	6	.625	23	–	10	.697
LSU	10	–	6	.625	17	–	14	.548
Missouri	7	–	9	.438	19	–	14	.576
Ole Miss	7	–	9	.438	19	–	14	.576
Georgia	6	–	10	.375	19	–	12	.613
Arkansas	6	–	10	.375	18	–	14	.563
Vanderbilt	5	–	11	.313	15	–	16	.484
Florida	5	–	11	.313	13	–	17	.433
Auburn	3	–	13	.188	13	–	18	.419
Alabama	2	–	14	.125	13	–	19	.406
† 2015 SEC tournament winner Rankings from AP poll

The 2015 Southeastern Conference women's basketball tournament was the postseason women's basketball tournament for the Southeastern Conference held at Verizon Arena, now known as Simmons Bank Arena. in North Little Rock, Arkansas from March 4 through 8, 2015. The tournament consisted of five rounds and included all 14 SEC teams. Seeds 5 through 10 received a first-round bye, and the top four seeds received a "double bye" through the first and second rounds.

== Seeds ==
2015 SEC Women's Basketball Tournament seeds
Seed	School	Conf.	Over.	Tiebreaker
1	South Carolina^{c‡†}	15–1	29–2	1–0 vs. Tennessee
2	Tennessee^{c†}	15–1	28–4	0–1 vs. South Carolina
3	Mississippi State^{†}	11–5	26–6	
4	LSU^{†}	10–6	17–13	1–0 vs. Kentucky; 1–1 vs. Texas A&M; 1–0 vs. Mississippi State
5	Texas A&M^{#}	10–6	23–9	1–0 vs. Kentucky; 1–1 vs. LSU; 0–1 vs. Mississippi State
6	Kentucky^{#}	10–6	23–9	0–2 vs. Texas A&M, LSU
7	Missouri^{#}	7–9	17–13	1–0 vs. Ole Miss
8	Ole Miss^{#}	7–9	17–13	0–1 vs. Missouri
9	Arkansas^{#}	6–10	17–13	1–0 vs. Georgia
10	Georgia^{#}	6–10	19–12	0–1 vs. Arkansas
11	Vanderbilt	5–11	15–16	1–1 vs. Florida; 1–1 vs. Mississippi State
12	Florida	5–11	13–17	1–1 vs. Vanderbilt; 0–1 vs. Mississippi State
13	Auburn	3–13	13–18	
14	Alabama	2–14	13–19	
‡ – Tournament No. 1 seed. c – SEC Regular Season co-champions. † – Received a double-bye in the conference tournament. # – Received a single-bye in the conference tournament. Overall records include all games played in the SEC Tournament.

== Schedule ==
Game	Time*	Matchup^{#}	Television	Attendance
First Round – Wednesday, March 4
1	4:00 p.m.	#12 Florida vs. #13 Auburn	SECN	1,915
2	6:30 p.m.	#11 Vanderbilt vs. #14 Alabama	SECN	1,915
Second Round – Thursday, March 5
3	Noon	#9 Arkansas vs. #8 Ole Miss	SECN	
4	2:30 p.m.	#5 Texas A&M vs. #13 Auburn	SECN	
5	5:00 p.m.	#7 Missouri vs. #10 Georgia	SECN	3,744
6	7:30 p.m.	#6 Kentucky vs. #11 Vanderbilt	SECN	3,744
Quarterfinals – Friday, March 6
7	Noon	#1 South Carolina vs. #9 Arkansas	SECN	4,630
8	2:30 p.m.	#4 LSU vs. #5 Texas A&M	SECN	4,630
9	6:00 p.m.	#2 Tennessee vs. #10 Georgia	SECN	4,189
10	8:30 p.m.	#3 Mississippi State vs. #6 Kentucky	SECN	4,189
Semifinals – Saturday, March 7
11	4:00 p.m.	#1 South Carolina vs. #4 LSU	ESPNU	5,524
12	6:30 p.m.	#2 Tennessee vs. #6 Kentucky	ESPNU	5,524
Championship – Sunday, March 8
13	2:30 p.m.	#1 South Carolina vs. #2 Tennessee	ESPN	5,819
*Game times in CT. # – Rankings denote tournament seed.

== Bracket ==
First round Wednesday, March 4 SECN
12	Florida	49
13	Auburn	71
11	Vanderbilt	66
14	Alabama	56

Second round Thursday, March 5 SECN
9	Arkansas	72
8	Ole Miss	61
13	Auburn	47
5	Texas A&M	57
10	Georgia	75
7	Missouri	64
11	Vanderbilt	61
6	Kentucky	67

Quarterfinals; Friday, March 6 SECN
9	Arkansas	36
1	South Carolina	58
5	Texas A&M	65
4	LSU	71
10	Georgia	41
2	Tennessee	75
6	Kentucky	76
3	Mississippi State	67

Semifinals; Saturday, March 7 ESPNU
1	South Carolina	74
4	LSU	54
2	Tennessee	75
6	Kentucky	64

Championship Game; Sunday, March 8 ESPN
1	South Carolina	62
2	Tennessee	46

== Tourney awards ==
- MVP – Aleighsa Welch, South Carolina
- All-Tournament Team – Makayla Epps (Kentucky), Cierra Burdick (Tennessee), Jordan Reynolds (Tennessee), Aleighsa Welch (South Carolina), and Alaina Coates (South Carolina)

== See also ==
- 2015 SEC men's basketball tournament
