= 2014–15 Arkansas Razorbacks women's basketball team =

Intercollegiate basketball season

2014–15 Arkansas Razorbacks women's basketball

NCAA Tournament, Round of 32
- Conference: Southeastern Conference
- Record: 18–14 (6–10 SEC)
- Head coach: Jimmy Dykes (1st season)
- Assistant coaches: Christy Smith; Tari Cummings; Simeon Hinsey
- Home arena: Bud Walton Arena

2014–15 SEC women's basketball standings
	Conf.				Overall
Team	W		L	PCT	W		L	PCT
No. 3 South Carolina*^{†}	15	–	1	.938	34	–	3	.919
No. 6 Tennessee	15	–	1	.938	30	–	6	.833
No. 12 Mississippi State	11	–	5	.688	27	–	7	.794
No. 11 Kentucky	10	–	6	.625	24	–	10	.706
No. 21 Texas A&M	10	–	6	.625	23	–	10	.697
LSU	10	–	6	.625	17	–	14	.548
Missouri	7	–	9	.438	19	–	14	.576
Ole Miss	7	–	9	.438	19	–	14	.576
Georgia	6	–	10	.375	19	–	12	.613
Arkansas	6	–	10	.375	18	–	14	.563
Vanderbilt	5	–	11	.313	15	–	16	.484
Florida	5	–	11	.313	13	–	17	.433
Auburn	3	–	13	.188	13	–	18	.419
Alabama	2	–	14	.125	13	–	19	.406
† 2015 SEC tournament winner Rankings from AP poll

The 2014–15 Arkansas Razorbacks women's basketball team represented the University of Arkansas in the 2014–15 college basketball season. The Razorbacks, led by first-year head coach Jimmy Dykes, played their games at Bud Walton Arena and were members of the Southeastern Conference. They finished the season 18–14, 6–10 in SEC play to finish in a tie for ninth place. They advanced to the quarterfinals of the SEC women's tournament, where they lost to South Carolina. They received an at-large bid to the NCAA women's tournament, where they defeated Northwestern in the first round before losing to Baylor in the second round.

== Roster ==
2014–15 Arkansas Razorbacks women's basketball team
Players
Coaches

Pos.	#	Name	Height	Year	Previous school	Hometown
F	00	Jessica Jackson	6 ft 3 in (1.91 m)	So	Jacksonville HS	Jacksonville, Ark.
G	11	Calli Berna	5 ft 10 in (1.78 m)	Sr	Fayetteville HS	Fayetteville, Ark.
G	14	McKinley Bostad	5 ft 9 in (1.75 m)	Fr	Kennedale HS	Kennedale, Texas
G	15	Kelsey Brooks	5 ft 9 in (1.75 m)	So	Olathe Northwest	Olathe, Kan.
F	21	Katie Powell	6 ft 4 in (1.93 m)	Fr	Duluth HS	Duluth, Ga.
F	25	Joey Bailey	6 ft 1 in (1.85 m)	RS Jr	Gunter HS	Gunter, Texas
F	32	Khadijah West	6 ft 2 in (1.88 m)	So	Huntington	Shreveport, La.
F	33	Melissa Wolff	6 ft 0 in (1.83 m)	Jr	Cabot HS	Cabot, Ark.
F	42	Jhasmin Bowen	6 ft 1 in (1.85 m)	Sr	Wichita Heights HS	Wichita, Kan.

Head coach

Jimmy Dykes

Assistant coach(es)

Christy Smith
Tari Cummings
Simeon Hinsey

Legend

- (C) Team captain
- (S) Suspended
- (I) Ineligible
- (W) Walk-on
- Injured
- Current redshirt

Roster
Last update: 2014-11-06

== Rankings ==
Ranking movement Legend: ██ Increase in ranking. ██ Decrease in ranking. NR = Not ranked. RV = Received votes.
Poll	Pre	Wk 2	Wk 3	Wk 4	Wk 5	Wk 6	Wk 7	Wk 8	Wk 9	Wk 10	Wk 11	Wk 12	Wk 13	Wk 14	Wk 15	Wk 16	Wk 17	Wk 18	Final
AP	RV	RV	RV	25т	RV	RV	RV	RV	RV	NR	NR	NR	NR	NR	NR	NR	NR	NR	NR
Coaches	RV	NR	NR	RV	NR	NR	NR	NR	NR	NR	NR	NR	NR	NR	NR	NR	NR	NR	NR

== Schedule ==
Date time, TV	Rank^{#}	Opponent^{#}	Result	Record	Site (attendance) city, state
Exhibition
Nov 9, 2014*; 2:00 p.m.		Northeastern State	W 65–32	–	Bud Walton Arena (N/A); Fayetteville, AR
Non-conference regular season
Nov 14, 2014*; 11:00 a.m.		Nicholls State	W 63–52	1–0	Bud Walton Arena (4,541); Fayetteville, AR
Nov 16, 2014*; 1:00 p.m.		Savannah State	W 75–46	2–0	Bud Walton Arena (703); Fayetteville, AR
Nov 20, 2014*; 6:00 p.m.		at Middle Tennessee	W 58–51	3–0	Murphy Center (4,120); Murfreesboro, TN
Nov 23, 2014*; 2:00 p.m.		Northwestern State	W 78–30	4–0	Bud Walton Arena (1,647); Fayetteville, AR
Nov 28, 2014*; 3:00 p.m.		vs. No. 18 Iowa; South Point Thanksgiving Shootout	W 77–67	5–0	South Point Arena (N/A); Las Vegas, NV
Nov 29, 2014*; 3:00 p.m.		vs. Richmond; South Point Thanksgiving Shootout	W 74–55	6–0	South Point Arena (177); Las Vegas, NV
Dec 4, 2014*; 7:00 p.m.	No. 25	South Dakota State	L 75–80 ^{OT}	6–1	Bud Walton Arena (1,577); Fayetteville, AR
Dec 7, 2014*; 2:00 p.m.	No. 25	No. 18 Rutgers	L 52–64	6–2	Bud Walton Arena (1,997); Fayetteville, AR
Dec 10, 2014*; 7:05 p.m.		at Missouri State	W 59–50	7–2	JQH Arena (2,503); Springfield, MO
Dec 14, 2014*; 2:00 p.m., ESPN3		at Tulsa	W 64–53	8–2	Reynolds Center (1,050); Tulsa, OK
Dec 21, 2014*; 3:00 p.m., SECN		vs. Oklahoma; Big 12/SEC Women's Challenge	W 71–64	9–2	Verizon Arena (3,689); North Little Rock, AR
Dec 29, 2014*; 7:00 p.m.		Grambling State	W 77–35	10–2	Bud Walton Arena (1,733); Fayetteville, AR
SEC regular season
Jan 2, 2015; 6:00 p.m.		at Ole Miss	L 57–71	10–3 (0–1)	Tad Smith Coliseum (1,098); Oxford, MS
Jan 4, 2014; 12:30 p.m., ESPNU		No. 5 Texas A&M	L 50–52	10–4 (0–2)	Bud Walton Arena (2,106); Fayetteville, AR
Jan 8, 2015; 8:00 p.m., FSN		at No. 14 Mississippi State	L 57–72	10–5 (0–3)	Humphrey Coliseum (3,556); Starkville, MS
Jan 11, 2015; 2:00 p.m., ESPNU		No. 7 Tennessee	L 51–60	10–6 (0–4)	Bud Walton Arena (2,344); Fayetteville, AR
Jan 18, 2015; 2:00 p.m., SECN		Missouri	W 73–55	11–6 (1–4)	Bud Walton Arena (4,299); Fayetteville, AR
Jan 22, 2015; 7:00 p.m.		at Vanderbilt	L 53–55	11–7 (1–5)	Memorial Gymnasium (2,685); Nashville, TN
Jan 25, 2015; 11:00 a.m., ESPNU		at Florida	L 58–72	11–8 (1–6)	O'Connell Center (2,214); Gainesville, FL
Jan 29, 2015; 7:00 p.m.		Auburn	W 52–47	12–8 (2–6)	Bud Walton Arena (1,474); Fayetteville, AR
Feb 5, 2015; 1:00 p.m., FSN		at Alabama	W 53–42	13–8 (3–6)	Foster Auditorium (2,591); Tuscaloosa, AL
Feb 29, 2015; 6:00 p.m., SECN		No. 24 Georgia	W 54–48	14–8 (4–6)	Bud Walton Arena (1,488); Fayetteville, AR
Feb 12, 2015; 8:00 p.m., SECN		at No. 15 Texas A&M	L 55–59	14–9 (4–7)	Reed Arena (4,443); College Station, TX
Feb 15, 2015; 1:00 p.m., SECN		at Auburn	W 54–36	15–9 (5–7)	Auburn Arena (2,270); Auburn, AL
Feb 19, 2015; 8:00 p.m., SECN		No. 2 South Carolina	L 56–73	15–10 (5–8)	Bud Walton Arena (1,531); Fayetteville, AR
Feb 22, 2015; 1:00 p.m., ESPNU		LSU	W 63–41	16–10 (6–8)	Bud Walton Arena (2,923); Fayetteville, AR
Feb 26, 2015; 7:00 p.m.		No. 13 Kentucky	L 51–59	16–11 (6–9)	Bud Walton Arena (2,614); Fayetteville, AR
Mar 1, 2015; 2:00 p.m.		at Missouri	L 41–57	16–12 (6–10)	Mizzou Arena (1,940); Columbia, MO
SEC Women's Tournament
Mar 5, 2015; Noon, SECN	(9)	vs. (8) Ole Miss; Second Round	W 72–61	17–12	Verizon Arena (N/A); North Little Rock, AR
Mar 6, 2015; Noon, SECN	(9)	vs. (1) No. 3 South Carolina; Quarterfinals	L 36–58	17–13	Verizon Arena (N/A); North Little Rock, AR
NCAA Women's Tournament
Mar 20, 2015*; 11:00 a.m., ESPN2	(10)	vs. (7) No. 22 Northwestern; First Round	W 57–55	18–13	Ferrell Center (N/A); Waco, TX
Mar 22, 2015*; 1:30 p.m., ESPN2	(10)	at (2) No. 5 Baylor; Second Round	L 44–73	18–14	Ferrell Center (4,593); Waco, TX
*Non-conference game. ^{#}Rankings from AP Polls. (#) Tournament seedings in parentheses. All times are in Central Time.

== See also ==
- 2014–15 Arkansas Razorbacks men's basketball team
