= Terri Williams =

American basketball player and coach

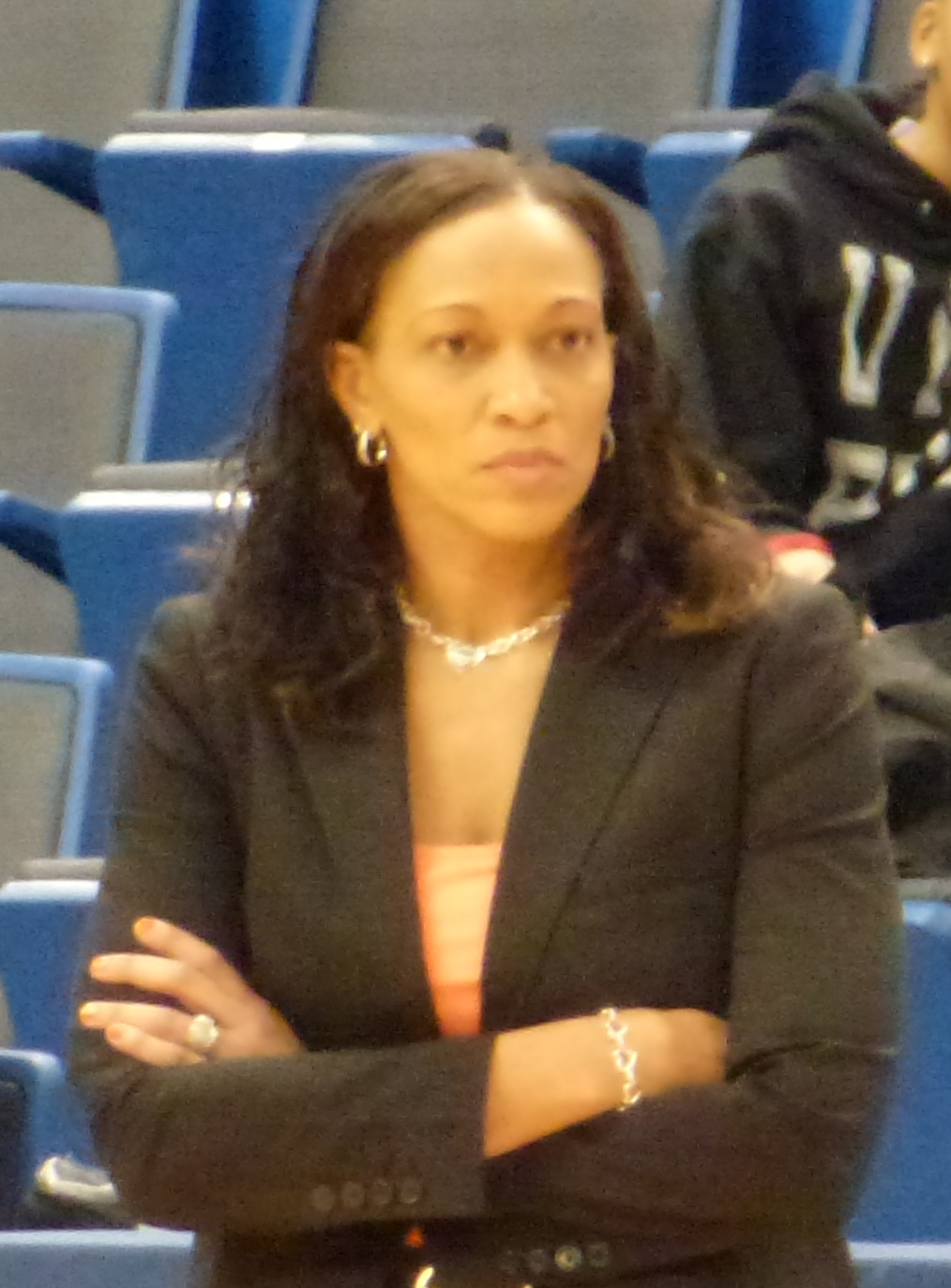

Current position
- Title: Head coach
- Team: Gardner–Webb
- Conference: Big South
- Record: 12–19 (.387)

Biographical details
- Born: January 11, 1969 (age 57); Hampton, Virginia, U.S.

Playing career
- 1988–91: Penn State

Coaching career (HC unless noted)
- 1992–1996: Georgetown (assistant)
- 1996–2002: Georgia (assistant)
- 2002–2004: Missouri State (assistant)
- 2004–2012: Georgetown
- 2012–2021: Auburn
- 2022–2025: Penn State (assistant)
- 2025–present: Gardner–Webb

Head coaching record
- Overall: 295–261 (.531)

Accomplishments and honors

Awards
- Big South Conference Co-coach of the Year (2026)
Medal record
Women's basketball
Assistant Coach for United States
World University Games
| Gold medal – first place | 2011 Shenzhen, China | Team competition |

Terri Williams (born January 11, 1969) is an American women's college basketball coach, who is currently head coach for the Gardner–Webb women's basketball team. From 2012 to 2021, she coached at Auburn University. From 2004 to 2012, she was coach at Georgetown. She had previously served as an assistant coach at Georgetown, Georgia, and Southwest Missouri State. Her overall record as an assistant coach is 251–116, through 12 seasons.

She played college basketball at Penn State from 1988 to 1991. The Nittany Lions played in the NCAA tournament 3 of those 4 years, and had won 2 straight conference championships in 1990 and 1991.

== Head coaching record ==
Record table
| Season | Team | Overall | Conference | Standing | Postseason |
|---|---|---|---|---|---|
Georgetown Hoyas (Big East Conference) (2004–2012)
| 2004–05 | Georgetown | 12–16 | 7–9 | T-6th | |
| 2005–06 | Georgetown | 10–17 | 3–13 | T-13th | |
| 2006–07 | Georgetown | 13–16 | 3–13 | T-13th | |
| 2007–08 | Georgetown | 15–14 | 5–11 | T-11th | |
| 2008–09 | Georgetown | 20–14 | 7–9 | T-9th | WNIT Elite Eight |
| 2009–10 | Georgetown | 26–7 | 13–3 | T-2nd | NCAA Second Round |
| 2010–11 | Georgetown | 24–11 | 9–7 | T-7th | NCAA Sweet Sixteen |
| 2011–12 | Georgetown | 23–9 | 11–5 | T-4th | NCAA Second Round |
| Georgetown: | | 143–104 (.579) | 58–70 (.453) | | |
Auburn Tigers (Southeastern Conference) (2012–2021)
| 2012–13 | Auburn | 19–15 | 5–11 | T-10th | WNIT Quarterfinals |
| 2013–14 | Auburn | 19–15 | 7–9 | 11th | WNIT Third Round |
| 2014–15 | Auburn | 13–18 | 3–13 | 13th | |
| 2015–16 | Auburn | 20–13 | 8–8 | T-7th | NCAA Second Round |
| 2016–17 | Auburn | 17–15 | 7–9 | T-8th | NCAA First Round |
| 2017–18 | Auburn | 14–15 | 5-11 | 10th | |
| 2018–19 | Auburn | 22–10 | 9–7 | T-6th | NCAA First Round |
| 2019–20 | Auburn | 11–18 | 4–12 | T-12th | |
| 2020–21 | Auburn | 5–19 | 0–15 | 13th | |
| Auburn: | | 140–138 (.504) | 48–95 (.336) | | |
Gardner–Webb Runnin' Bulldogs (Big South Conference) (2025–present)
| 2025–26 | Gardner–Webb | 12–19 | 9–7 | 4th | |
| Gardner–Webb: | | 12–19 (.387) | 9–7 (.563) | | |
| Total: | | 295–261 (.531) | | | |
National champion Postseason invitational champion Conference regular season champion Conference regular season and conference tournament champion Division regular season champion Division regular season and conference tournament champion Conference tournament champion

== Career statistics ==
Legend
| GP | Games played | GS | Games started | MPG | Minutes per game | RPG | Rebounds per game |
| APG | Assists per game | SPG | Steals per game | BPG | Blocks per game | PPG | Points per game |
| TO | Turnovers per game | FG% | Field-goal percentage | 3P% | 3-point field-goal percentage | FT% | Free-throw percentage |
| **Bold** | Career best | ° | League leader |

=== College ===
| Year | Team | GP | GS | MPG | FG% | 3P% | FT% | RPG | APG | SPG | BPG | TO | PPG |
|---|---|---|---|---|---|---|---|---|---|---|---|---|---|
| 1987–88 | Penn State | 29 | - | - | **40.9** | 0.0 | 63.6 | **1.7** | 0.3 | 0.2 | **0.1** | - | 2.7 |
| 1988–89 | Penn State | 26 | - | - | 27.1 | 0.0 | 47.6 | 1.4 | 0.4 | 0.4 | 0.0 | - | 1.6 |
| 1990–91 | Penn State | **30** | - | - | 34.9 | 29.4 | **77.8** | 1.5 | **0.9** | **0.8** | **0.1** | - | 2.9 |
| 1991–92 | Penn State | 26 | - | - | 35.8 | **33.3** | 69.6 | 0.9 | 0.6 | 0.5 | **0.1** | - | **3.2** |
| **Career** | | 111 | - | - | 35.4 | 29.8 | 65.9 | 1.4 | 0.5 | 0.5 | **0.1** | - | 2.6 |
Statistics retrieved from Sports-Reference.
