= 2014–15 LSU Lady Tigers basketball team =

Intercollegiate basketball season

2014–15 LSU Lady Tigers basketball

NCAA Women's Tournament, first round
- Conference: Southeastern Conference
- Record: 17–14 (10–6 SEC)
- Head coach: Nikki Fargas (4th season)
- Assistant coaches: Tasha Butts; Tony Perotti
- Home arena: Pete Maravich Assembly Center

2014–15 SEC women's basketball standings
| | Conf. | | | | Overall |
| Team | W | | L | PCT | W | | L | PCT |
|---|---|---|---|---|---|---|---|---|
| No. 3 South Carolina*^{†} | 15 | – | 1 | .938 | 34 | – | 3 | .919 |
| No. 6 Tennessee | 15 | – | 1 | .938 | 30 | – | 6 | .833 |
| No. 12 Mississippi State | 11 | – | 5 | .688 | 27 | – | 7 | .794 |
| No. 11 Kentucky | 10 | – | 6 | .625 | 24 | – | 10 | .706 |
| No. 21 Texas A&M | 10 | – | 6 | .625 | 23 | – | 10 | .697 |
| LSU | 10 | – | 6 | .625 | 17 | – | 14 | .548 |
| Missouri | 7 | – | 9 | .438 | 19 | – | 14 | .576 |
| Ole Miss | 7 | – | 9 | .438 | 19 | – | 14 | .576 |
| Georgia | 6 | – | 10 | .375 | 19 | – | 12 | .613 |
| Arkansas | 6 | – | 10 | .375 | 18 | – | 14 | .563 |
| Vanderbilt | 5 | – | 11 | .313 | 15 | – | 16 | .484 |
| Florida | 5 | – | 11 | .313 | 13 | – | 17 | .433 |
| Auburn | 3 | – | 13 | .188 | 13 | – | 18 | .419 |
| Alabama | 2 | – | 14 | .125 | 13 | – | 19 | .406 |
† 2015 SEC tournament winner Rankings from AP poll

The 2014–15 LSU Lady Tigers basketball team represented Louisiana State University during the 2014–15 NCAA Division I women's basketball season college basketball season. The Lady Tigers were led by fourth year head coach Nikki Fargas. They played their home games at Pete Maravich Assembly Center and were members of the Southeastern Conference. They finished the season 17–14, 10–6 in SEC play to finish in a three-way tie for fourth place. They advanced to the semifinals of the SEC women's tournament, where they lost to LSU. They received an at-large bid to the NCAA women's tournament, where they lost to South Florida in the first round.

== Roster ==
2014–15 LSU Tigers women's basketball team
Players
Coaches

| Pos. | # | Name | Height | Year | Previous school | Hometown |
|---|---|---|---|---|---|---|
| G | 1 | Jenna Deemer | 5 ft 7 in (1.7 m) | Fr | Ursuline Academy | New Orleans, La. |
| G | 3 | Akilah Bethel | 6 ft 0 in (1.83 m) | Jr | Academy of Holy Cross/West Virginia | Baltimore, Md. |
| G | 4 | Anne Pedersen | 6 ft 1 in (1.85 m) | Jr | The Rock School (Fla.) | Copenhagen, Denmark |
| G | 10 | Jasmine Rhodes | 5 ft 10 in (1.78 m) | So | Faith Academy | Mobile, Ala. |
| G | 11 | Raigyne Moncrief | 5 ft 10 in (1.78 m) | So | American Heritage HS | Fort Lauderdale, Fla. |
| G | 13 | Rina Hill | 5 ft 7 in (1.7 m) | So | IMG Academy (Fla.) | Nagoya-Shi, Japan |
| F | 20 | Alexis Hyder | 5 ft 11 in (1.8 m) | Jr | Lyndon B. Johnson Early College HS/North Texas | Austin, Texas |
| F | 21 | Stephanie Amichia | 6 ft 1 in (1.85 m) | Fr | North Gwinnett HS | Suwanee, Ga. |
| G | 24 | DaShawn Harden | 5 ft 9 in (1.75 m) | Sr | St. Thomas Aquinas HS/Johnson County (Kan.) CC | Olathe, Kan. |
| F | 31 | Ann Jones | 6 ft 3 in (1.91 m) | Jr | Liberty Magnet School/Memphis | Jackson, Tenn. |
| G | 32 | Danielle Ballard | 5 ft 9 in (1.75 m) | Jr | Memphis Central HS | Memphis, Tenn. |
| F/C | 35 | Alliyah Fareo | 6 ft 3 in (1.91 m) | Fr | New South Wales HS | Sydney, Australia |
| F | 42 | Sheila Boykin | 6 ft 2 in (1.88 m) | Sr | Long Beach Poly HS | Los Angeles, Calif. |

Head coach

Nikki Fargas

Assistant coach(es)

Tasha Butts
Tony Perotti

Legend

- (C) Team captain
- (S) Suspended
- (I) Ineligible
- (W) Walk-on
- Injured
- Current redshirt

Roster
Last update: 2013-10-04

== Schedule and results ==
| Date time, TV | Rank^{#} | Opponent^{#} | Result | Record | Site (attendance) city, state |
Exhibition
| Nov 5, 2014*; 7:00 p.m. | | Loyola (New Orleans) | W 93–71 | – | Maravich Center (875); Baton Rouge, LA |
| Nov 9, 2014*; 1:00 p.m. | | Mississippi College | W 96–35 | – | Maravich Center (675); Baton Rouge, LA |
Non-conference regular season
| Nov 14, 2014*; 11:30 a.m. | | Arkansas–Little Rock | L 54–70 | 0–1 | Maravich Center (4,914); Baton Rouge, LA |
| Nov 15, 2014*; 3:30 p.m. | | Sam Houston State | W 71–45 | 1–1 | Maravich Center (2,102); Baton Rouge, LA |
| Nov 17, 2014*; 7:00 p.m. | | Jackson State | W 52–44 ^{OT} | 2–1 | Maravich Center (2,129); Baton Rouge, LA |
| Nov 19, 2014*; 7:00 p.m. | | Tulane | L 45–51 | 2–2 | Maravich Center (2,111); Baton Rouge, LA |
| Nov 22, 2014*; 2:00 p.m. | | No. 22 Rutgers; Sue Gunter Classic | L 57–64 | 2–3 | Maravich Center (2,846); Baton Rouge, LA |
| Nov 25, 2014*; 3:30 p.m. | | vs. Santa Clara; Hardwood Tournament of Hope | L 67–69 | 2–4 | Puerto Vallarta International Convention Center (275); Puerto Vallarta, MX |
| Nov 26, 2014*; 3:30 p.m. | | vs. UTEP; Hardwood Tournament of Hope | | | Puerto Vallarta International Convention Center; Puerto Vallarta, MX |
| Nov 27, 2014*; 5:00 p.m. | | vs. Kansas State; Hardwood Tournament of Hope | | | Puerto Vallarta International Convention Center; Puerto Vallarta, MX |
| Dec 3, 2014*; 6:00 p.m., SECN | | Louisiana Tech | W 73–59 | 3–4 | Maravich Center (2,272); Baton Rouge, LA |
| Dec 14, 2014*; 2:00 p.m. | | Southeastern Louisiana | W 75–42 | 4–4 | Maravich Center (2,511); Baton Rouge, LA |
| Dec 16, 2014*; 9:00 p.m. | | at Long Beach State | L 44–59 | 4–5 | Walter Pyramid (690); Long Beach, CA |
| Dec 19, 2014*; 9:30 p.m. | | at UC Santa Barbara | W 78–45 | 5–5 | The Thunderdome (522); Santa Barbara, CA |
| Dec 28, 2014*; 2:30 p.m. | | vs. UNC Greensboro; Miami Holiday Tournament semifinals | W 82–61 | 6–5 | BankUnited Center (1,123); Coral Gables, FL |
| Dec 29, 2014*; 2:30 p.m. | | at Miami (FL); Miami Holiday Tournament championship | L 71–76 | 6–6 | BankUnited Center (1,134); Coral Gables, FL |
SEC regular season
| Jan 2, 2015; 6:00 p.m. | | at Florida | W 68–65 | 7–6 (1–0) | O'Connell Center (1,620); Gainesville, FL |
| Jan 4, 2015; 2:00 p.m., ESPN2 | | No. 1 South Carolina | L 51–75 | 7–7 (1–1) | Maravich Center (3,438); Baton Rouge, LA |
| Jan 8, 2015; 8:00 p.m., SECN | | Vanderbilt | W 64–44 | 8–7 (2–1) | Maravich Center (2,131); Baton Rouge, LA |
| Jan 11, 2015; Noon, ESPNU | | at No. 9 Texas A&M | L 48–55 | 8–8 (2–2) | Reed Arena (4,763); College Station, TX |
| Jan 15, 2015; 7:00 p.m. | | at No. 15 Mississippi State | W 71–69 ^{2OT} | 9–8 (3–2) | Humphrey Coliseum (4,727); Starkville, MS |
| Jan 18, 2015; 1:00 p.m., ESPNU | | No. 10 Kentucky | W 84–79 | 10–8 (4–2) | Maravich Center (3,820); Baton Rouge, LA |
| Jan 22, 2015; 6:00 p.m., SECN | | at No. 5 Tennessee | L 58–75 | 10–9 (4–3) | Thompson–Boling Arena (11,612); Knoxville, TN |
| Jan 29, 2015; 8:00 p.m., SECN | | Ole Miss | W 70–41 | 11–9 (5–3) | Maravich Center (2,321); Baton Rouge, LA |
| Feb 2, 2015; 6:00 p.m., SECN | | Missouri | W 74–65 | 12–9 (6–3) | Maravich Center (2,483); Baton Rouge, LA |
| Feb 5, 2015; 6:00 p.m., FSN | | at Auburn | W 60–49 | 13–9 (7–3) | Auburn Arena (1,899); Auburn, AL |
| Feb 8, 2015; 4:00 p.m., SECN | | Alabama | W 51–39 | 14–9 (8–3) | Maravich Center (3,416); Baton Rouge, LA |
| Feb 12, 2015; 6:00 p.m., FSN | | at No. 1 South Carolina | L 62–86 | 14–10 (8–4) | Colonial Life Arena (12,342); Columbia, SC |
| Feb 19, 2015; 7:00 p.m. | | Georgia | W 64–52 | 15–10 (9–4) | Maravich Center (2,635); Baton Rouge, LA |
| Feb 22, 2015; 1:00 p.m., ESPNU | | at Arkansas | L 41–63 | 15–11 (9–5) | Bud Walton Arena (2,923); Fayetteville, AR |
| Feb 26, 2015; 6:00 p.m. | | at Ole Miss | L 57–58 | 15–12 (9–6) | Tad Smith Coliseum (1,346); Oxford, MS |
| Mar 1, 2015; 1:00 p.m., ESPNU | | No. 12 Texas A&M | W 80–63 | 16–12 (10–6) | Maravich Center (3,463); Baton Rouge, LA |
2015 SEC Tournament
| Mar 6, 2015; 2:30 p.m., SECN | | vs. No. 18 Texas A&M; Quarterfinals | W 71–65 | 17–12 | Verizon Arena (4,630); North Little Rock, AR |
| Mar 7, 2015; 4:00 p.m., ESPNU | | vs. No. 3 South Carolina; Semifinals | L 54–74 | 17–13 | Verizon Arena (N/A); North Little Rock, AR |
NCAA Women's Tournament
| Mar 21, 2015*; 5:30 p.m., ESPN2 | | at No. 25 South Florida; First Round | L 64–73 | 17–14 | USF Sun Dome; Tampa, FL |
*Non-conference game. ^{#}Rankings from AP Poll. (#) Tournament seedings in parentheses. All times are in Central Time.

== Rankings ==
Ranking movement Legend: ██ Increase in ranking. ██ Decrease in ranking. NR = Not ranked. RV = Received votes.
| Poll | Pre | Wk 2 | Wk 3 | Wk 4 | Wk 5 | Wk 6 | Wk 7 | Wk 8 | Wk 9 | Wk 10 | Wk 11 | Wk 12 | Wk 13 | Wk 14 | Wk 15 | Wk 16 | Wk 17 | Wk 18 | Final |
|---|---|---|---|---|---|---|---|---|---|---|---|---|---|---|---|---|---|---|---|
| AP | RV | NR | NR | NR | NR | NR | NR | NR | NR | NR | RV | RV | RV | RV | RV | NR | RV | RV | RV |
| Coaches | 24 | NR | NR | NR | NR | NR | NR | NR | NR | NR | RV | RV | RV | RV | RV | NR | NR | NR | NR |

* The November 26 game vs. UTEP and November 27th vs. Kansas was canceled due to a facility conflict. Those games were not rescheduled.

== See also ==
2014–15 LSU Tigers basketball team
