= 2014–15 Georgia Lady Bulldogs basketball team =

Intercollegiate basketball season

2014–15 Georgia Lady Bulldogs basketball
- Conference: Southeastern Conference
- Record: 19–12 (6–10 SEC)
- Head coach: Andy Landers (36th season)
- Assistant coaches: Joni Taylor; Angie Johnson; Robert Mosley
- Home arena: Stegeman Coliseum

2014–15 SEC women's basketball standings
	Conf.				Overall
Team	W		L	PCT	W		L	PCT
No. 3 South Carolina*^{†}	15	–	1	.938	34	–	3	.919
No. 6 Tennessee	15	–	1	.938	30	–	6	.833
No. 12 Mississippi State	11	–	5	.688	27	–	7	.794
No. 11 Kentucky	10	–	6	.625	24	–	10	.706
No. 21 Texas A&M	10	–	6	.625	23	–	10	.697
LSU	10	–	6	.625	17	–	14	.548
Missouri	7	–	9	.438	19	–	14	.576
Ole Miss	7	–	9	.438	19	–	14	.576
Georgia	6	–	10	.375	19	–	12	.613
Arkansas	6	–	10	.375	18	–	14	.563
Vanderbilt	5	–	11	.313	15	–	16	.484
Florida	5	–	11	.313	13	–	17	.433
Auburn	3	–	13	.188	13	–	18	.419
Alabama	2	–	14	.125	13	–	19	.406
† 2015 SEC tournament winner Rankings from AP poll

The 2014–15 Georgia Lady Bulldogs women's basketball team represented University of Georgia in the 2014–15 college basketball season. The Lady Bulldogs, led by thirty-sixth and final year head coach Andy Landers. The team plays their home games at Stegeman Coliseum and were members of the Southeastern Conference. They finished the season 19–12, 6–10 in SEC play to finish in a tie for ninth place. They advanced to the quarterfinals of the SEC women's tournament where they lost to Tennessee. They missed the postseason tournament for the first time since 1994.

== Roster ==
2014–15 Georgia Bulldogs women's basketball team
Players
Coaches

Pos.	#	Name	Height	Year	Previous school	Hometown
G	1	Terryuana Goodwin	5 ft 4 in (1.63 m)	RS Jr	Butler (Kans.) CC	Hogansville, Ga.
G	2	Sydnei McCaskill	5 ft 6 in (1.68 m)	So	Dr. Phillips HS	Orlando, Fla.
G	3	Tiaria Griffin	5 ft 7 in (1.7 m)	Jr	Hattiesburg HS	Monticello, Miss.
G	4	Hannahkohl Almire	5 ft 9 in (1.75 m)	So	Riverwood Charter School	Atlanta, Ga.
F	10	Samantha Glodis	6 ft 3 in (1.91 m)	So	Dwyer HS	West Palm Beach, Fla.
G/F	11	Pachis Roberts	5 ft 11 in (1.8 m)	RS So	Syracuse	Powder Springs, Ga.
G	12	Haley Clark	5 ft 9 in (1.75 m)	Fr	Edgewater HS	Orlando, Fla.
F	13	Merritt Hempe	6 ft 2 in (1.88 m)	Jr	Stafford HS	Fredericksburg, Va.
G	14	Jasmine Carter	5 ft 7 in (1.7 m)	Fr	St. Pius X HS	Dacula, Ga.
F	15	Krista Donald	5 ft 11 in (1.8 m)	Sr	Lake HS	Lake, Miss.
G/F	20	Shacobia Barbee	5 ft 10 in (1.78 m)	Jr	Riverdale HS	Murfreesboro, Tenn.
F	23	Halle Washington	6 ft 2 in (1.88 m)	So	Parkway HS	Bossier City, La.
G	24	Marjorie Butler	5 ft 8 in (1.73 m)	Jr	The Webb School	Knoxville, Tenn.
G	31	Erika Ford	5 ft 9 in (1.75 m)	Sr	Chattahoochee HS	Alpharetta, Ga.
F	33	Mackenzie Engram	6 ft 2 in (1.88 m)	Fr	Hillgrove HS	Powder Springs, Ga.
F	54	Nasheema Oliver	6 ft 3 in (1.91 m)	Fr	Crisp County HS	Cordele, Ga.

Head coach

Andy Landers

Assistant coach(es)

Joni Crenshaw
Angie Johnson
Robert Mosley

Legend

- (C) Team captain
- (S) Suspended
- (I) Ineligible
- (W) Walk-on
- Injured
- Current redshirt

Roster
Last update: 2014-09-03

== Schedule ==
Date time, TV	Rank^{#}	Opponent^{#}	Result	Record	Site (attendance) city, state
Non-conference regular season
Nov 14, 2014*; 7:00 p.m.		Morgan State	W 68–36	1–0	Stegeman Coliseum (3,054); Athens, GA
Nov 16, 2014*; 1:00 p.m.		TCU	W 62–53	2–0	Stegeman Coliseum (2,994); Athens, GA
Nov 19, 2014*; 7:00 p.m.	No. 24	at Ohio State	W 67–59	3–0	Value City Arena (3,844); Columbus, OH
Nov 23, 2014*; 2:00 p.m.	No. 24	at Georgia Tech	W 64–57	4–0	Hank McCamish Pavilion (2,468); Atlanta, GA
Nov 25, 2014*; 7:00 p.m.	No. 22	Georgia Southern	W 93–52	5–0	Stegeman Coliseum (2,508); Athens, GA
Nov 26, 2014*; 7:00 p.m.	No. 22	Colgate	W 66–35	6–0	Stegeman Coliseum (2,240); Athens, GA
Nov 29, 2014*; 7:00 p.m.	No. 22	at Tennessee Tech	W 71–54	7–0	Eblen Center (923); Cookeville, TN
Dec 2, 2014*; 7:00 p.m.	No. 19	Coppin State	W 49–29	8–0	Stegeman Coliseum (2,303); Athens, GA
Dec 4, 2014*; 7:00 p.m.	No. 19	at Mercer	W 68–49	9–0	Hawkins Arena (2,816); Macon, GA
Dec 7, 2014*; 4:00 p.m., SECN	No. 19	No. 16 Michigan State	W 69–60	10–0	Stegeman Coliseum (3,524); Athens, GA
Dec 20, 2014*; 4:00 p.m.	No. 15	Furman	W 58–51	11–0	Stegeman Coliseum (2,869); Athens, GA
Dec 22, 2014*; 7:00 p.m.	No. 14	Belmont	W 62–43	12–0	Stegeman Coliseum (2,363); Athens, GA
Dec 28, 2014*; 2:00 p.m.	No. 14	at Seton Hall	L 51–70	12–1	Walsh Gymnasium (724); South Orange, NJ
SEC Regular Season
Jan 2, 2015; 8:00 p.m.	No. 19	at No. 17 Mississippi State	L 56–64	12–2 (0–1)	Humphrey Coliseum (4,114); Starkville, MS
Jan 4, 2015; 1:00 p.m., FSN	No. 19	Alabama	W 64–47	13–2 (1–1)	Stegeman Coliseum (3,419); Athens, GA
Jan 8, 2015; 7:00 p.m.	No. 20	Missouri	W 69–48	14–2 (2–1)	Stegeman Coliseum (2,467); Athens, GA
Jan 11, 2015; 2:00 p.m., SECN	No. 20	at Auburn	W 57–52	15–2 (3–1)	Auburn Arena (2,751); Auburn, AL
Jan 15, 2015; 7:00 p.m.	No. 18	at Ole Miss	L 52–55	15–3 (3–2)	Tad Smith Coliseum (917); Oxford, MS
Jan 18, 2015; Noon, SECN	No. 18	Vanderbilt	W 64–53	16–3 (4–2)	Stegeman Coliseum (4,401); Athens, GA
Jan 22, 2015; 7:00 p.m.	No. 22	No. 10 Texas A&M	W 54–51	17–3 (5–2)	Stegeman Coliseum (2,946); Athens, GA
Jan 25, 2015; 2:00 p.m., SECN	No. 22	at No. 5 Tennessee	L 51–59	17–4 (5–3)	Thompson–Boling Arena (13,428); Nashville, TN
Feb 1, 2015; 1:00 p.m., SECN	No. 21	at No. 10 Kentucky	L 72–80	17–5 (5–4)	Memorial Coliseum (6,991); Lexington, KY
Feb 5, 2015; 7:00 p.m., SECN	No. 22	No. 1 South Carolina	L 35–58	17–6 (5–5)	Stegeman Coliseum (4,896); Athens, GA
Feb 9, 2015; 7:00 p.m., SECN	No. 24	at Arkansas	L 48–54	17–7 (5–6)	Bud Walton Arena (1,488); Fayetteville, AR
Feb 12, 2015; 7:00 p.m.	No. 24	Florida	L 48–51	17–8 (5–7)	Stegeman Coliseum (3,322); Athens, GA
Feb 19, 2015; 8:00 p.m.		at LSU	L 52–64	17–9 (5–8)	Maravich Center (2,635); Baton Rouge, LA
Feb 22, 2015; 2:00 p.m.		Auburn	L 26–44	17–10 (5–9)	Stegeman Coliseum (4,855); Athens, GA
Feb 26, 2015; 9:00 p.m., SECN		No. 6 Tennessee	L 59–70	17–11 (5–10)	Stegeman Coliseum (3,624); Athens, GA
Mar 1, 2015; 3:00 p.m., SECN		at Florida	W 52–45	18–11 (6–10)	O'Connell Center (2,331); Gainesville, FL
SEC Women's Tournament
Mar 5, 2015; 6:00 p.m., SECN		vs. Missouri; Second Round	W 75–64	19–11	Verizon Arena (N/A); North Little Rock, AR
Mar 6, 2015; 7:00 p.m., SECN		vs. No. 5 Tennessee; Quarterfinals	L 41–75	19–12	Verizon Arena (4,189); North Little Rock, AR
*Non-conference game. ^{#}Rankings from AP Poll. (#) Tournament seedings in parentheses. All times are in Eastern Time.

== Rankings ==
Ranking movement Legend: ██ Increase in ranking. ██ Decrease in ranking. NR = Not ranked. RV = Received votes.
Poll	Pre	Wk 2	Wk 3	Wk 4	Wk 5	Wk 6	Wk 7	Wk 8	Wk 9	Wk 10	Wk 11	Wk 12	Wk 13	Wk 14	Wk 15	Wk 16	Wk 17	Wk 18	Final
AP	RV	24т	22т	19	16	15	14	19	20	18	22	21	22	24	RV	NR	NR	NR	NR
Coaches	RV	RV	25	23	18	17	16	19	19	16	19	20	21	RV	RV	NR	NR	NR	NR

== See also ==
- 2014–15 Georgia Bulldogs basketball team
