= 2014–15 Florida Gators women's basketball team =

Intercollegiate basketball season

2014–15 Florida Gators women's basketball
- Conference: Southeastern Conference
- Record: 13–17 (5–11 SEC)
- Head coach: Amanda Butler (8th season)
- Assistant coaches: David Lowery (2nd season); Murriel Page (5th season); Angela Crosby (8th season)
- Home arena: O'Connell Center

2014–15 SEC women's basketball standings
	Conf.				Overall
Team	W		L	PCT	W		L	PCT
No. 3 South Carolina*^{†}	15	–	1	.938	34	–	3	.919
No. 6 Tennessee	15	–	1	.938	30	–	6	.833
No. 12 Mississippi State	11	–	5	.688	27	–	7	.794
No. 11 Kentucky	10	–	6	.625	24	–	10	.706
No. 21 Texas A&M	10	–	6	.625	23	–	10	.697
LSU	10	–	6	.625	17	–	14	.548
Missouri	7	–	9	.438	19	–	14	.576
Ole Miss	7	–	9	.438	19	–	14	.576
Georgia	6	–	10	.375	19	–	12	.613
Arkansas	6	–	10	.375	18	–	14	.563
Vanderbilt	5	–	11	.313	15	–	16	.484
Florida	5	–	11	.313	13	–	17	.433
Auburn	3	–	13	.188	13	–	18	.419
Alabama	2	–	14	.125	13	–	19	.406
† 2015 SEC tournament winner Rankings from AP poll

The 2014–15 Florida Gators women's basketball team represented the University of Florida in the sport of basketball during the 2014–15 women's college basketball season. The Gators competed in Division I of the National Collegiate Athletic Association (NCAA) and the Southeastern Conference (SEC). They were led by eighth-year head coach Amanda Butler, and played their home games in the O'Connell Center on the university's Gainesville, Florida campus. They finished the season 13–17, 5–11 in SEC play to finish in a tie for eleventh place. They lost in the first round of SEC women's tournament to Auburn.

== Previous season ==
The Gators finished the season 20–13, 8–8 in SEC play for a fifth-place finish. In the postseason, the Gators advanced to the Quarterfinal round of the SEC tournament, where they were defeated by the Kentucky Wildcats 70–75, their only loss to Kentucky of the season. The Gators were then selected to compete in the NCAA tournament, and advanced to the second round after defeating the Dayton Flyers 83–69. In the second round, the Gators were ousted by the Penn State Lady Lions 61–83.

== Roster ==
2014–15 Florida Gators women's basketball team
Players
Coaches

Pos.	#	Name	Height	Year	Hometown
G/F	1	Ronni Williams	6 ft 0 in (1.83 m)	So	Daytona Beach, Florida
G	2	Isis Young	5 ft 7 in (1.7 m)	Fr	Berlin, New Jersey
G	3	January Miller	5 ft 8 in (1.73 m)	Jr	Orlando, Florida
G	4	Carlie Needles	5 ft 6 in (1.68 m)	RS Jr	Highlands Ranch, Colorado
G	5	Antoinette Bannister	5 ft 10 in (1.78 m)	Jr	Jacksonville, Florida
G	11	Dyandria Anderson	5 ft 10 in (1.78 m)	Fr	Viera, Florida
F	12	Pamela Begič	6 ft 0 in (1.83 m)	So	Semič, Slovenia
G	13	Cassie Peoples	5 ft 6 in (1.68 m)	RS Jr	San Antonio, Texas
C	15	Viktorija Dimaite	6 ft 4 in (1.93 m)	RS Jr	Panevėžys, Lithuania
G	22	Kayla Lewis	6 ft 0 in (1.83 m)	RS Sr	Decatur, Georgia
F	23	Brooke Copeland	6 ft 2 in (1.88 m)	Fr	Cleveland, Tennessee
F	44	Haley Lorenzen	6 ft 3 in (1.91 m)	Fr	Iowa City, Iowa

Head coach

- Amanda Butler (8th year)

Assistant coach(es)

- David Lowery (8th year)
- Murriel Page (5th year)
- Angela Crosby (2nd year)

Legend

- (C) Team captain
- (S) Suspended
- (I) Ineligible
- (W) Walk-on
- Injured
- Current redshirt

Roster
Last update: 2014-10-02

=== Coaches ===
Name	Position	College	Graduating year
Amanda Butler	Head coach	University of Florida	1995
Angela Crosby	Assistant coach	Appalachian State University	1995
David Lowery	Assistant coach	Mississippi State University	2000
Murriel Page	Assistant coach	University of Florida	1998
Serena Wilson	Director of Basketball Operations	University of Florida	2008
Shellie Greenman	Program Coordinator	Emory and Henry College	1988
Travis Kwok	Video Coordinator	University of Florida	2008
Tyler Stuart	Strength & Conditioning Coordinator	Anderson University	2007
John "JB" Barrett	Athletic trainer	Mississippi State University	1997
Judy Traveis	Academic Advisor	University of Florida	1993

== Schedule and results ==
Date time, TV	Rank^{#}	Opponent^{#}	Result	Record	Site (attendance) city, state
Non-conference Regular Season
Nov 14, 2014*; 3:15 p.m.		Jacksonville	W 84–73	1–0	O'Connell Center (1,439); Gainesville, FL
Nov 17, 2014*; 4:15 p.m.		Longwood	W 91–46	2–0	O'Connell Center (1,224); Gainesville, FL
Nov 20, 2014*; 7:00 p.m.		at St. John's	L 66–72	2–1	Carnesecca Arena (1,272); Queens, NY
Nov 25, 2014*; 7:00 p.m.		Charleston Southern	W 92–64	3–1	O'Connell Center (1,080); Gainesville, FL
Nov 28, 2014*; 7:00 p.m.		at Georgetown	W 81–73	4–1	McDonough Gymnasium (741); Washington, D.C.
Dec 1, 2014*; 9:00 p.m., SECN		Virginia Tech	W 73–44	5–1	O'Connell Center (925); Gainesville, FL
Dec 4, 2014*; 6:00 p.m.		at Savannah State	L 58–68	5–2	Tiger Arena (2,268); Savannah, GA
Dec 7, 2014*; 2:00 p.m., ESPN3		at Florida State	L 51–77	5–3	Donald L. Tucker Civic Center (3,008); Tallahassee, FL
Dec 10, 2014*; 7:00 p.m., SECN		Wisconsin	L 48–51	5–4	O'Connell Center (1,679); Gainesville, FL
Dec 14, 2014*; 1:00 p.m.		Stetson	W 59–54	6–4	O'Connell Center (1,309); Gainesville, FL
Dec 21, 2014*; 2:30 p.m.		Southern; Gator Holiday Classic semifinals	W 78–49	7–4	O'Connell Center (1,350); Gainesville, FL
Dec 22, 2014*; 2:30 p.m.		Eastern Washington; Gator Holiday Classic championship	L 56–67	7–5	O'Connell Center (1,143); Gainesville, FL
Dec 28, 2014*; 2:00 p.m.		North Florida	W 63–51	8–5	O'Connell Center (1,413); Gainesville, FL
SEC Regular season
Jan 2, 2015; 7:00 p.m.		LSU	L 65–68	8–6 (0–1)	O'Connell Center (1,620); Gainesville, FL
Jan 4, 2015; 4:00 p.m., SECN		at Auburn	W 63–50	9–6 (1–1)	Auburn Arena (1,990); Auburn, AL
Jan 8, 2015; 7:00 p.m., FSN		Ole Miss	L 57–64	9–7 (1–2)	O'Connell Center (1,125); Gainesville, FL
Jan 11, 2015; 4:00 p.m., SECN		at Missouri	L 47–66	9–8 (1–3)	Mizzou Arena (1,676); Columbia, MO
Jan 15, 2015; 7:00 p.m., SECN		at No. 10 Kentucky	L 56–62	9–9 (1–4)	Memorial Coliseum (5,134); Lexington, KY
Jan 19, 2015; 7:00 p.m., SECN		No. 1 South Carolina	L 42–77	9–10 (1–5)	O'Connell Center (1,503); Gainesville, FL
Jan 25, 2015; Noon, ESPNU		Arkansas	W 72–58	10–10 (2–5)	O'Connell Center (2,214); Gainesville, FL
Jan 29, 2015; 7:00 p.m.		Missouri	L 52–68	10–11 (2–6)	O'Connell Center (1,161); Gainesville, FL
Feb 1, 2015; 1:00 p.m., FSN		at Vanderbilt	W 67–58	11–11 (3–6)	Memorial Gymnasium (3,292); Nashville, TN
Feb 8, 2015; 2:00 p.m., ESPNU		No. 6 Tennessee	L 56–64	11–12 (3–7)	O'Connell Center (3,439); Gainesville, FL
Feb 12, 2015; 7:00 p.m.		at No. 24 Georgia	W 51–48	12–12 (4–7)	Stegeman Coliseum (3,322); Athens, GA
Feb 15, 2015; 4:00 p.m., SECN		at No. 13 Mississippi State	L 62–75	12–13 (4–8)	Humphrey Coliseum (5,183); Starkville, MS
Feb 19, 2015; 7:00 p.m., SECN		Vanderbilt	L 75–76 ^{OT}	12–14 (4–9)	O'Connell Center (1,134); Gainesville, FL
Feb 22, 2015; 4:00 p.m., SECN		at No. 15 Texas A&M	L 46–66	12–15 (4–10)	Reed Arena (5,631); College Station, TX
Feb 26, 2015; 7:00 p.m., SECN		at Alabama	W 53–49	13–15 (5–10)	Foster Auditorium (2,314); Tuscaloosa, AL
Mar 1, 2015; 3:00 p.m., SECN		Georgia	L 45–52	13–16 (5–11)	O'Connell Center (2,331); Gainesville, FL
2015 SEC Tournament
Mar 4, 2015; 5:00 p.m., SECN		vs. Auburn; First Round	L 49–71	13–17	Verizon Arena (1,915); North Little Rock, AR
*Non-conference game. ^{#}Rankings from AP Poll. (#) Tournament seedings in parentheses. All times are in Eastern Time.

== Rankings ==
Ranking movement Legend: ██ Increase in ranking. ██ Decrease in ranking. NR = Not ranked. RV = Received votes.
Poll	Pre	Wk 2	Wk 3	Wk 4	Wk 5	Wk 6	Wk 7	Wk 8	Wk 9	Wk 10	Wk 11	Wk 12	Wk 13	Wk 14	Wk 15	Wk 16	Wk 17	Wk 18	Final
AP	NR	NR	NR	NR	NR	NR	NR	NR	NR	NR	NR	NR	NR	NR	NR	NR	NR	NR	NR
Coaches	NR	NR	NR	NR	NR	NR	NR	NR	NR	NR	NR	NR	NR	NR	NR	NR	NR	NR	NR

== See also ==
- 2014–15 Florida Gators men's basketball team
