= 2014–15 Missouri Tigers women's basketball team =

Intercollegiate basketball season

2014–15 Missouri Tigers women's basketball

WNIT, Third Round
- Conference: Southeastern Conference
- Record: 19–14 (7–9 SEC)
- Head coach: Robin Pingeton (5th season)
- Assistant coaches: Jenny Putnam; Willie Cox; Michael Porter
- Home arena: Mizzou Arena

2014–15 SEC women's basketball standings
| | Conf. | | | | Overall |
| Team | W | | L | PCT | W | | L | PCT |
|---|---|---|---|---|---|---|---|---|
| No. 3 South Carolina*^{†} | 15 | – | 1 | .938 | 34 | – | 3 | .919 |
| No. 6 Tennessee | 15 | – | 1 | .938 | 30 | – | 6 | .833 |
| No. 12 Mississippi State | 11 | – | 5 | .688 | 27 | – | 7 | .794 |
| No. 11 Kentucky | 10 | – | 6 | .625 | 24 | – | 10 | .706 |
| No. 21 Texas A&M | 10 | – | 6 | .625 | 23 | – | 10 | .697 |
| LSU | 10 | – | 6 | .625 | 17 | – | 14 | .548 |
| Missouri | 7 | – | 9 | .438 | 19 | – | 14 | .576 |
| Ole Miss | 7 | – | 9 | .438 | 19 | – | 14 | .576 |
| Georgia | 6 | – | 10 | .375 | 19 | – | 12 | .613 |
| Arkansas | 6 | – | 10 | .375 | 18 | – | 14 | .563 |
| Vanderbilt | 5 | – | 11 | .313 | 15 | – | 16 | .484 |
| Florida | 5 | – | 11 | .313 | 13 | – | 17 | .433 |
| Auburn | 3 | – | 13 | .188 | 13 | – | 18 | .419 |
| Alabama | 2 | – | 14 | .125 | 13 | – | 19 | .406 |
† 2015 SEC tournament winner Rankings from AP poll

The 2014–15 Missouri Tigers women's basketball team represented the University of Missouri in the 2014–15 NCAA Division I women's basketball season. The Tigers led by fifth year head coach Robin Pingeton, they played their games at Mizzou Arena and were members of the Southeastern Conference. They finished the season 19–14, 7–9 in SEC play to finish in a tie for seventh place. They lost in the second round of the SEC women's basketball tournament to Georgia. They were invited to the Women's National Invitation Tournament, where they defeated Northern Iowa in the first round, Kansas State in the second round before getting defeated by Michigan in the third round.

== Roster ==
2014–15 Missouri Tigers women's basketball team
Players
Coaches

| Pos. | # | Name | Height | Year | Previous school | Hometown |
|---|---|---|---|---|---|---|
| G | 1 | Lianna Doty | 5 ft 7 in (1.7 m) | Jr | Kirkwood | St. Louis, Mo. |
| G | 2 | Morgan Stock | 6 ft 1 in (1.85 m) | Jr | St. Joseph's Academy | Town & Country, Mo. |
| G | 3 | Bree Fowler | 5 ft 9 in (1.75 m) | Sr | Staley | Kansas City, Mo. |
| F | 4 | Bri Porter | 6 ft 3 in (1.91 m) | Fr | Rock Bridge | Columbia, Mo. |
| F | 5 | Davionna Holmes | 6 ft 3 in (1.91 m) | RS Fr | Louisville | East St. Louis, Ill. |
| G | 10 | Maddie Stock | 6 ft 0 in (1.83 m) | Jr | St. Joseph's Academy | Town & Country, Mo. |
| G | 11 | Lindsey Cunningham | 6 ft 0 in (1.83 m) | RS So | Rock Bridge | Columbia, Mo. |
| F | 12 | Michelle Hudyn | 6 ft 2 in (1.88 m) | Jr | Eastwood Collegiate | Kitchener, Ontario |
| G | 15 | Carrie Shephard | 5 ft 4 in (1.63 m) | Fr | South Pemiscot | Steele, Mo. |
| F | 20 | Kayla McDowell | 6 ft 2 in (1.88 m) | So | Mason High School | Cincinnati, Ohio |
| G/F | 22 | Jordan Fereicks | 6 ft 1 in (1.85 m) | So | Quincy Notre Dame | Quincy, Ill. |
| G | 23 | Juanita Robinson | 5 ft 10 in (1.78 m) | Jr | Johnson County Community College | Chicago, Ill. |
| G | 24 | Sierra Michaelis | 5 ft 10 in (1.78 m) | So | North Mercer High School | Mercer, Mo. |
| G | 30 | Morgan Eye | 5 ft 9 in (1.75 m) | Sr | Montrose | Montrose, Mo. |

Head coach

Robin Pingeton

Assistant coach(es)

Jenny Putnam
Willie Cox
Michael Porter

Legend

- (C) Team captain
- (S) Suspended
- (I) Ineligible
- (W) Walk-on
- Injured
- Current redshirt

Roster
Last update: 2014-10-05

== Schedule and results ==
| Date time, TV | Rank^{#} | Opponent^{#} | Result | Record | Site (attendance) city, state |
Exhibition
| Nov 5, 2014*; 7:00 p.m. | | Lindenwood | W 67–61 | – | Mizzou Arena (N/A); Columbia, MO |
| Nov 11, 2014*; 7:00 p.m. | | Missouri Western | W 78–75 | – | Mizzou Arena (N/A); Columbia, MO |
Non-conference regular season
| Nov 15, 2014*; 2:00 p.m. | | Western Illinois | W 89–52 | 1–0 | Mizzou Arena (1,351); Columbia, MO |
| Nov 17, 2014*; 7:00 p.m. | | Southeast Missouri State | W 88–42 | 2–0 | Mizzou Arena (1,375); Columbia, MO |
| Nov 21, 2014*; 8:30 p.m. | | vs. UNLV; Rainbow Wahine Showdown | W 79–60 | 3–0 | Stan Sheriff Center (N/A); Honolulu, HI |
| Nov 23, 2014*; 6:00 p.m. | | vs. No. 14 California; Rainbow Wahine Showdown | L 70–82 | 3–1 | Stan Sheriff Center (N/A); Honolulu, HI |
| Nov 30, 2014*; 2:00 p.m. | | Milwaukee | W 68–55 | 4–1 | Mizzou Arena (1,066); Columbia, MO |
| Dec 3, 2014*; 7:00 p.m. | | Loyola–Chicago | W 56–45 | 5–1 | Mizzou Arena (1,062); Columbia, MO |
| Dec 6, 2014*; 2:00 p.m. | | at Bradley | L 64–76 | 5–2 | Renaissance Coliseum (534); Peoria, IL |
| Dec 8, 2014*; 7:00 p.m. | | Saint Louis | W 74–55 | 6–2 | Mizzou Arena (1,212); Columbia, MO |
| Dec 12, 2014*; 7:00 p.m. | | Colorado | W 53–50 | 7–2 | Mizzou Arena (1,615); Columbia, MO |
| Dec 14, 2014*; 2:00 p.m. | | Northern Illinois | W 47–40 | 8–2 | Mizzou Arena (1,348); Columbia, MO |
| Dec 20, 2014*; 1:00 p.m. | | at Wake Forest | W 79–64 | 9–2 | LJVM Coliseum (422); Winston-Salem, NC |
| Dec 22, 2014*; 7:00 p.m. | | Tennessee–Martin | W 74–65 | 10–2 | Mizzou Arena (2,104); Columbia, MO |
| Dec 30, 2014*; 4:00 p.m. | | vs. Missouri State | L 52–57 | 10–3 | Sprint Center (4,052); Kansas City, MO |
SEC regular season
| Jan 2, 2015; 8:00 p.m., SECN | | at No. 8 Tennessee | L 53–63 | 10–4 (0–1) | Thompson–Boling Arena (9,570); Knoxville, TN |
| Jan 4, 2015; 2:00 p.m. | | No. 17 Mississippi State | L 47–53 | 10–5 (0–2) | Mizzou Arena (1,432); Columbia, MO |
| Jan 8, 2015; 6:00 p.m. | | at No. 20 Georgia | L 48–69 | 10–6 (0–3) | Stegeman Coliseum (2,467); Athens, GA |
| Jan 11, 2015; 3:00 p.m., SECN | | Florida | W 66–47 | 11–6 (1–3) | Mizzou Arena (1,646); Columbia, MO |
| Jan 15, 2015; 8:00 p.m., SECN | | No. 1 South Carolina | L 49–60 | 11–7 (1–4) | Mizzou Arena (1,440); Columbia, MO |
| Jan 18, 2015; 2:00 p.m., SECN | | at Arkansas | L 55–73 | 11–8 (1–5) | Bud Walton Arena (4,299); Fayetteville, AR |
| Jan 25, 2015; 3:00 p.m., SECN | | No. 14 Kentucky | L 69–83 | 11–9 (1–6) | Mizzou Arena (2,471); Columbia, MO |
| Jan 29, 2015; 6:00 p.m. | | at Florida | W 68–52 | 12–9 (2–6) | O'Connell Center (1,161); Gainesville, FL |
| Feb 2, 2015; 6:00 p.m., SECN | | at LSU | L 65–74 | 12–10 (2–7) | Maravich Center (2,483); Baton Rouge, LA |
| Feb 5, 2015; 8:00 p.m., SECN | | No. 14 Texas A&M | L 48–55 | 12–11 (2–8) | Mizzou Arena (N/A); Columbia, MO |
| Feb 8, 2015; 2:00 p.m. | | Auburn | W 59–49 | 13–11 (3–8) | Mizzou Arena (2,614); Columbia, MO |
| Feb 12, 2015; 8:00 p.m., FSN | | at Alabama | L 64–67 | 13–12 (3–9) | Foster Auditorium (2,180); Tuscaloosa, AL |
| Feb 15, 2015; 2:00 p.m. | | Ole Miss | W 72–58 | 14–12 (4–9) | Mizzou Arena (2,103); Columbia, MO |
| Feb 22, 2015; 1:00 p.m., SECN | | at Vanderbilt | W 54–51 | 15–12 (5–9) | Memorial Gymnasium (3,314); Nashville, TN |
| Feb 26, 2015; 7:00 p.m. | | at No. 12 Texas A&M | W 70–69 | 16–12 (6–9) | Reed Arena (6,733); College Station, TX |
| Mar 1, 2015; 2:00 p.m., SECN | | Arkansas | W 57–41 | 17–12 (7–9) | Mizzou Arena (1,940); Columbia, MO |
SEC Tournament
| Mar 5, 2015; 5:00 p.m., SECN | | vs. Georgia; Second Round | L 64–75 | 17–13 | Verizon Arena (N/A); North Little Rock, AR |
WNIT
| Mar 19, 2015*; 7:00 p.m. | | at Northern Iowa; First Round | W 69–61 | 18–13 | McLeod Center (632); Cedar Falls, IA |
| Mar 22, 2015*; 2:00 p.m. | | at Kansas State; Second Round | W 68–47 | 19–13 | Bramlage Coliseum (1,772); Manhattan, KS |
| Mar 26, 2015*; 6:00 p.m. | | at Michigan; Third Round | L 55–65 | 19–14 | Crisler Center (1,383); Ann Arbor, MI |
*Non-conference game. ^{#}Rankings from AP Poll. (#) Tournament seedings in parentheses. All times are in Central Time.

== See also ==
- 2014–15 Missouri Tigers men's basketball team
