= 2014–15 Ole Miss Rebels women's basketball team =

Intercollegiate basketball season

2014–15 Ole Miss Rebels women's basketball

Nugget Classic Champions

WNIT, Third Round
- Conference: Southeastern Conference
- Record: 19–14 (7–9 SEC)
- Head coach: Matt Insell (2nd season)
- Assistant coaches: Alex Simmons; Brittany Hudson; Todd Schaefer
- Home arena: Tad Smith Coliseum

2014–15 SEC women's basketball standings
	Conf.				Overall
Team	W		L	PCT	W		L	PCT
No. 3 South Carolina*^{†}	15	–	1	.938	34	–	3	.919
No. 6 Tennessee	15	–	1	.938	30	–	6	.833
No. 12 Mississippi State	11	–	5	.688	27	–	7	.794
No. 11 Kentucky	10	–	6	.625	24	–	10	.706
No. 21 Texas A&M	10	–	6	.625	23	–	10	.697
LSU	10	–	6	.625	17	–	14	.548
Missouri	7	–	9	.438	19	–	14	.576
Ole Miss	7	–	9	.438	19	–	14	.576
Georgia	6	–	10	.375	19	–	12	.613
Arkansas	6	–	10	.375	18	–	14	.563
Vanderbilt	5	–	11	.313	15	–	16	.484
Florida	5	–	11	.313	13	–	17	.433
Auburn	3	–	13	.188	13	–	18	.419
Alabama	2	–	14	.125	13	–	19	.406
† 2015 SEC tournament winner Rankings from AP poll

The 2014–15 Ole Miss Rebels women's basketball team represented University of Mississippi during the 2014–15 NCAA Division I women's basketball season. The Rebels, who were led by second-year head coach Matt Insell, played their home games at Tad Smith Coliseum and are members of the Southeastern Conference. They finished the season 19–14, 7–9 in SEC play to finish in a tie for seventh place. They lost in the second round of the SEC women's basketball tournament to Arkansas. They were invited to the Women's National Invitation Tournament where they defeated Tennessee–Martin in the first round, Georgia Tech in the second round before losing to Middle Tennessee in the third round.

== Roster ==
2014–15 Ole Miss Rebels women's basketball team
Players
Coaches

Pos.	#	Name	Height	Year	Previous school	Hometown
G	00	Kiara Golden	5 ft 8 in (1.73 m)	Fr	Center Hill H.S.	Olive Branch, Miss.
G	1	Toree Thompson	5 ft 10 in (1.78 m)	Fr	Broken Arrow H.S.	Broken Arrow, Okla.
G	3	A'Queen Hayes	5 ft 8 in (1.73 m)	Fr	Horn Lake H.S.	Horn Lake, Miss.
G/F	4	Precious Person	6 ft 1 in (1.85 m)	Jr	Rutgers	Jonesboro, Ga.
G	5	Erika Sisk	5 ft 9 in (1.75 m)	So	Murray State	Oxford, Miss.
F	11	Shequila Joseph	6 ft 3 in (1.91 m)	So	Barking Abby School	London, England
G	12	Gracie Frizzell	5 ft 10 in (1.78 m)	Jr	Central Arkansas Christian H.S.	Little Rock, Ark.
G	13	Sarah Porter	5 ft 10 in (1.78 m)	Fr	Horizon Christian Academy	San Diego, Calif.
F	15	Kelsey Briggs	6 ft 3 in (1.91 m)	Fr	Overton	Memphis, Tenn.
G	20	Amber Singletary	5 ft 9 in (1.75 m)	Sr	Seton Keough H.S.	Baltimore, Md.
F	22	Danielle McCray	6 ft 1 in (1.85 m)	Sr	Trinity Christian Academy	West Palm Beach, Fla.
G	23	Shandricka Sessom	5 ft 10 in (1.78 m)	Fr	Byhalia H.S.	Byhalia, Miss.
F	32	Tia Faleru	6 ft 1 in (1.85 m)	Sr	Carroll H.S.	Ozark, Ala.

Head coach

Matt Insell

Assistant coach(es)

Alex Simmons
Brittany Hudson
Todd Schaefer

Legend

- (C) Team captain
- (S) Suspended
- (I) Ineligible
- (W) Walk-on
- Injured
- Current redshirt

Roster
Last update: 2014-10-08

== Schedule ==
Date time, TV	Rank^{#}	Opponent^{#}	Result	Record	Site (attendance) city, state
Exhibition
Nov 7, 2014*; 5:00 p.m.		Christian Brothers	W 111–43	–	Tad Smith Coliseum (N/A); Oxford, MS
Non-conference regular season
Nov 14, 2014*; 11:00 a.m.		Grambling State	W 92–67	1–0	Tad Smith Coliseum (5,696); Oxford, MS
Nov 16, 2014*; 2:00 p.m.		Mississippi State Valley	W 91–38	2–0	Tad Smith Coliseum (660); Oxford, MS
Nov 20, 2014*; 6:00 p.m.		Southern	W 91–68	3–0	Tad Smith Coliseum (683); Oxford, MS
Nov 23, 2014*; 3:00 p.m.		Middle Tennessee	L 65–71	3–1	Tad Smith Coliseum (1,075); Oxford, MS
Nov 25, 2014*; 3:00 p.m.		Southeast Missouri State	W 58–57	4–1	Tad Smith Coliseum (881); Oxford, MS
Nov 28, 2014*; 8:30 p.m.		vs. Utah; Nugget Classic semifinals	W 52–38	5–1	Lawlor Events Center (163); Reno, NV
Nov 29, 2014*; 6:30 p.m.		at Nevada; Nugget Classic championship	W 77–66	6–1	Lawlor Events Center (631); Reno, NV
Dec 4, 2014*; 7:00 p.m., ASN		at WKU	L 69–98	6–2	E. A. Diddle Arena (1,396); Bowling Green, KY
Dec 7, 2014*; 2:00 p.m.		No. 11 Baylor	L 57–96	6–3	Tad Smith Coliseum (2,388); Oxford, MS
Dec 14, 2014*; 2:00 p.m.		South Alabama	W 88–48	7–3	Tad Smith Coliseum (950); Oxford, MS
Dec 18, 2014*; 4:00 p.m.		Southern Miss	W 68–66	8–3	Tad Smith Coliseum (796); Oxford, MS
Dec 20, 2014*; Noon		Alabama A&M	W 71–47	9–3	Tad Smith Coliseum (758); Oxford, MS
Dec 29, 2014*; 6:00 p.m.		Southeastern Louisiana	W 79–71 ^{OT}	10–3	Tad Smith Coliseum (912); Oxford, MS
SEC regular season
Jan 2, 2015; 6:00 p.m.		Arkansas	W 71–57	11–3 (1–0)	Tad Smith Coliseum (1,098); Oxford, MS
Jan 4, 2015; 1:00 p.m., SECN		at No. 11 Kentucky	L 58–64	11–4 (1–1)	Memorial Coliseum (6,162); Lexington, KY
Jan 8, 2015; 6:00 p.m., FSN		at Florida	W 64–57	12–4 (2–1)	O'Connell Center (1,125); Gainesville, FL
Jan 11, 2015; 2:00 p.m.		Alabama	W 77–63	13–4 (3–1)	Tad Smith Coliseum (970); Oxford, MS
Jan 15, 2015; 6:00 p.m.		No. 18 Georgia	W 55–52	14–4 (4–1)	Tad Smith Coliseum (917); Oxford, MS
Jan 18, 2015; 4:00 p.m., SECN		at No. 11 Texas A&M	L 49–58	14–5 (4–2)	Reed Arena (4,732); College Station, TX
Jan 22, 2015; 8:00 p.m., SECN		No. 18 Mississippi State	L 62–64	14–6 (4–3)	Tad Smith Coliseum (3,383); Oxford, MS
Jan 29, 2015; 8:00 p.m., SECN		at LSU	L 41–70	14–7 (4–4)	Maravich Center (2,321); Baton Rouge, LA
Feb 1, 2015; 3:30 p.m., ESPNU		No. 1 South Carolina	L 59–77	14–8 (4–5)	Tad Smith Coliseum (1,935); Oxford, MS
Feb 5, 2015; 7:00 p.m.		at Vanderbilt	L 54–58	14–9 (4–6)	Memorial Gymnasium (2,785); Nashville, TN
Feb 12, 2015; 6:00 p.m.		No. 6 Tennessee	L 49–69	14–10 (4–7)	Tad Smith Coliseum (2,051); Oxford, MS
Feb 15, 2015; 7:00 p.m.		at Missouri	L 58–72	14–11 (4–8)	Mizzou Arena (2,103); Columbia, MO
Feb 19, 2015; 8:00 p.m., FSN		at Auburn	W 51–46	15–11 (5–8)	Auburn Arena (1,790); Auburn, AL
Feb 23, 2015; 6:00 p.m., SECN		No. 13 Kentucky	W 67–59	16–11 (6–8)	Tad Smith Coliseum (1,017); Oxford, MS
Feb 26, 2015; 8:00 p.m., SECN		LSU	W 58–57	17–11 (7–8)	Tad Smith Coliseum (1,346); Oxford, MS
Mar 1, 2015; 1:00 p.m., FSN		at No. 11 Mississippi State	L 47–55	17–12 (7–9)	Humphrey Coliseum (7,326); Starkville, MS
SEC Women's Tournament
Mar 5, 2015; Noon, SECN		vs. Arkansas; Second Round	L 61–72	17–13	Verizon Arena (N/A); North Little Rock, AR
WNIT
Mar 18, 2015*; 7:00 p.m.		Tennessee–Martin; First Round	W 80–70	18–13	Tad Smith Coliseum (1,178); Oxford, MS
Mar 22, 2015*; 6:00 p.m.		Georgia Tech; Second Round	W 63–48	19–13	Tad Smith Coliseum (1,075); Oxford, MS
Mar 26, 2015*; 7:00 p.m.		at Middle Tennessee; Third Round	L 70–82	19–14	Murphy Center (2,806); Murfreesboro, TN
*Non-conference game. ^{#}Rankings from AP Poll. (#) Tournament seedings in parentheses. All times are in Central Time.

== See also ==
- 2014–15 Ole Miss Rebels men's basketball team
