= 2014–15 Alabama Crimson Tide women's basketball team =

Intercollegiate basketball season

2014–15 Alabama Crimson Tide women's basketball
- Conference: Southeastern Conference
- Record: 13–19 (2–14 SEC)
- Head coach: Kristy Curry (2nd season)
- Assistant coaches: Kelly Curry; Terry Nooner; Shereka Wright
- Home arena: Foster Auditorium; Coleman Coliseum

2014–15 SEC women's basketball standings
	Conf.				Overall
Team	W		L	PCT	W		L	PCT
No. 3 South Carolina*^{†}	15	–	1	.938	34	–	3	.919
No. 6 Tennessee	15	–	1	.938	30	–	6	.833
No. 12 Mississippi State	11	–	5	.688	27	–	7	.794
No. 11 Kentucky	10	–	6	.625	24	–	10	.706
No. 21 Texas A&M	10	–	6	.625	23	–	10	.697
LSU	10	–	6	.625	17	–	14	.548
Missouri	7	–	9	.438	19	–	14	.576
Ole Miss	7	–	9	.438	19	–	14	.576
Georgia	6	–	10	.375	19	–	12	.613
Arkansas	6	–	10	.375	18	–	14	.563
Vanderbilt	5	–	11	.313	15	–	16	.484
Florida	5	–	11	.313	13	–	17	.433
Auburn	3	–	13	.188	13	–	18	.419
Alabama	2	–	14	.125	13	–	19	.406
† 2015 SEC tournament winner Rankings from AP poll

The 2014–15 Alabama Crimson Tide women's basketball team represented the University of Alabama in the 2014–15 college basketball season. The Crimson Tide, led by second year head coach Kristy Curry, played their games at Foster Auditorium with two games at Coleman Coliseum and were members of the Southeastern Conference. They finished the season 13–19, 2–14 in SEC play to finish in last place. They lost in the first round of the SEC women's tournament to Vanderbilt.

== Roster ==
2014–15 Alabama Crimson Tide women's basketball team
Players
Coaches

Pos.	#	Name	Height	Year	Previous school	Hometown
F	1	Quanetria Bolton	6 ft 0 in (1.83 m)	Fr	Anniston HS	Anniston, Ala.
F	3	Khadijah Carter	6 ft 1 in (1.85 m)	Jr	Jacksonville College	Goodrich, Texas
G	11	Hannah Cook	6 ft 0 in (1.83 m)	Fr	Ozark HS	Ozark, Mo.
F/C	34	Oceana Hamilton	6 ft 4 in (1.93 m)	So	St. Edmund Campion	Mississauga, Ontario, Canada
G	5	Breanna Hayden	5 ft 8 in (1.73 m)	So	Baylor	Dallas, Texas
F	13	Nikki Hegstetter	6 ft 2 in (1.88 m)	Jr	Harrison HS	Kennesaw, Ga.
F	25	Briana Hutchen	6 ft 1 in (1.85 m)	Sr	Rutgers	Baltimore, Md.
G	15	Meoshonti Knight	5 ft 8 in (1.73 m)	Fr	Central Catholic HS	Morgan City, La.
G	22	Karyla Middlebrook	5 ft 7 in (1.7 m)	RS Fr	Blue Springs HS	Blue Springs, Mo.
G	33	Sharin Rivers	5 ft 3 in (1.6 m)	Sr	Shelton State	Huntsville, Ala.
F	20	Ashley Williams	6 ft 0 in (1.83 m)	So	Alcovy HS	Covington, Ga.

Head coach

Kristy Curry

Assistant coach(es)

Kelly Curry
Terry Nooner
Shereka Wright

Legend

- (C) Team captain
- (S) Suspended
- (I) Ineligible
- (W) Walk-on
- Injured
- Current redshirt

Roster
Last update: 2014-08-22

== Schedule ==
Date time, TV	Rank^{#}	Opponent^{#}	Result	Record	Site (attendance) city, state
Exhibition
Nov 9, 2014*; 2:00 p.m.		North Alabama	W 80–48	–	Foster Auditorium (2,001); Tuscaloosa, AL
Regular Season
Nov 14, 2014*; 5:30 p.m.		Florida A&M	W 60–44	1–0	Coleman Coliseum (2,309); Tuscaloosa, AL
Nov 16, 2014*; 7:00 p.m., SECN		No. 7 Duke	L 40–90	1–1	Foster Auditorium (2,765); Tuscaloosa, AL
Nov 18, 2014*; 6:00 p.m.		Jacksonville State	L 62–64	1–2	Foster Auditorium (2,244); Tuscaloosa, AL
Nov 21, 2014*; 6:00 p.m., ESPN3		at Kansas; Hall of Fame Women's Challenge	W 85–80	2–2	Allen Fieldhouse (N/A); Lawrence, KS
Nov 22, 2014*; 6:30 p.m.		vs. Georgetown; Hall of Fame Women's Challenge	W 72–58	3–2	Allen Fieldhouse (1,719); Lawrence, KS
Nov 23, 2014*; 11:30 a.m.		vs. Temple; Hall of Fame Women's Challenge	W 58–51	4–2	Allen Fieldhouse (N/A); Lawrence, KS
Nov 26, 2014*; 6:00 p.m.		Alabama A&M	W 75–44	5–2	Foster Auditorium (2,541); Tuscaloosa, AL
Nov 30, 2014*; 10:00 a.m., ESPN3		vs. Quinnipiac; Hall of Fame Women's Challenge	L 66–73	5–3	Mohegan Sun Arena (N/A); Uncasville, CT
Dec 2, 2014*; 6:00 p.m.		USC Upstate	W 74–65	6–3	Foster Auditorium (2,243); Tuscaloosa, AL
Dec 4, 2014*; 6:00 p.m.		Tennessee–Martin	W 68–55	7–3	Foster Auditorium (2,194); Tuscaloosa, AL
Dec 7, 2014*; 2:00 p.m.		No. 12 Nebraska	W 53–51	8–3	Foster Auditorium (2,562); Tuscaloosa, AL
Dec 14, 2014*; Noon, SECN		Mercer	L 39–46	8–4	Foster Auditorium (2,246); Tuscaloosa, AL
Dec 16, 2014*; 11:00 a.m.		Arkansas–Pine Bluff	W 71–27	9–4	Coleman Coliseum (4,242); Tuscaloosa, AL
Dec 21, 2014*; 2:00 p.m.		New Orleans	W 87–58	10–4	Foster Auditorium (2,365); Tuscaloosa, AL
Dec 28, 2014*; 2:00 p.m.		Mississippi Valley State	W 71–40	11–4	Foster Auditorium (2,273); Tuscaloosa, AL
Jan 2, 2015; 6:00 p.m.		No. 11 Kentucky	L 66–78	11–5 (0–1)	Foster Auditorium (2,654); Tuscaloosa, AL
Jan 4, 2015; Noon, FSN		at No. 19 Georgia	L 47–64	11–6 (0–2)	Stegeman Coliseum (3,419); Athens, GA
Jan 8, 2015; 6:00 p.m.		No. 1 South Carolina	L 59–102	11–7 (0–3)	Foster Auditorium (2,454); Tuscaloosa, AL
Jan 11, 2015; 2:00 p.m.		at Ole Miss	L 63–77	11–8 (0–4)	Tad Smith Coliseum (970); Oxford, MS
Jan 18, 2015; 3:00 p.m., FSN		at No. 15 Mississippi State	L 50–66	11–9 (0–5)	Humphrey Coliseum (4,557); Starkville, MS
Jan 22, 2015; 8:00 p.m., FSN		Auburn	W 51–50	12–9 (1–5)	Foster Auditorium (2,506); Tuscaloosa, AL
Jan 25, 2015; Noon, FSN		Vanderbilt	L 52–55	12–10 (1–6)	Foster Auditorium (2,628); Tuscaloosa, AL
Jan 29, 2015; 6:00 p.m.		at No. 1 South Carolina	L 54–85	12–11 (1–7)	Colonial Life Arena (11,927); Columbia, SC
Feb 1, 2015; 1:00 p.m.		Arkansas	L 42–53	12–12 (1–8)	Foster Auditorium (2,591); Tuscaloosa, AL
Feb 8, 2015; 4:00 p.m., SECN		at LSU	L 39–51	12–13 (1–9)	Maravich Center (3,416); Baton Rouge, LA
Feb 12, 2015; 8:00 p.m., FSN		Missouri	W 67–64	13–13 (2–9)	Foster Auditorium (2,180); Tuscaloosa, AL
Feb 16, 2015; 6:00 p.m., SECN		at Texas A&M	L 49–70	13–14 (2–10)	Foster Auditorium (4,507); Tuscaloosa, AL
Feb 19, 2015; 6:00 p.m., FSN		at No. 6 Tennessee	L 56–77	13–15 (2–11)	Thompson–Boling Arena (9,637); Knoxville, TN
Feb 22, 2015; 2:00 p.m.		No. 14 Mississippi State	L 55–57	13–16 (2–12)	Foster Auditorium (3,133); Tuscaloosa, AL
Feb 26, 2015; 6:00 p.m., SECN		Florida	L 49–53	13–17 (2–13)	Foster Auditorium (2,314); Tuscaloosa, AL
Mar 1, 2015; 2:00 p.m.		at Auburn	L 73–80	13–18 (2–14)	Auburn Arena (3,721); Auburn, AL
2015 SEC Tournament
Mar 4, 2015; 6:30 p.m., SECN	(14)	vs. (11) Vanderbilt; First Round	L 56–66	13–19	Verizon Arena (1,915); North Little Rock, AR
*Non-conference game. ^{#}Rankings from AP Poll. (#) Tournament seedings in parentheses. All times are in Central Time.

== See also ==
- 2014–15 Alabama Crimson Tide men's basketball team
