= 2014–15 Mississippi State Lady Bulldogs basketball team =

Intercollegiate basketball season

2014–15 Mississippi State Lady Bulldogs basketball

Preseason WNIT champions

NCAA tournament, second round
- Conference: Southeastern Conference

Ranking
- Coaches: No. 14
- AP: No. 12
- Record: 27–7 (11–5 SEC)
- Head coach: Vic Schaefer (3rd season)
- Assistant coaches: Johnnie Harris; Aqua Franklin; Elena Lovato
- Home arena: Humphrey Coliseum

2014–15 SEC women's basketball standings
	Conf.				Overall
Team	W		L	PCT	W		L	PCT
No. 3 South Carolina*^{†}	15	–	1	.938	34	–	3	.919
No. 6 Tennessee	15	–	1	.938	30	–	6	.833
No. 12 Mississippi State	11	–	5	.688	27	–	7	.794
No. 11 Kentucky	10	–	6	.625	24	–	10	.706
No. 21 Texas A&M	10	–	6	.625	23	–	10	.697
LSU	10	–	6	.625	17	–	14	.548
Missouri	7	–	9	.438	19	–	14	.576
Ole Miss	7	–	9	.438	19	–	14	.576
Georgia	6	–	10	.375	19	–	12	.613
Arkansas	6	–	10	.375	18	–	14	.563
Vanderbilt	5	–	11	.313	15	–	16	.484
Florida	5	–	11	.313	13	–	17	.433
Auburn	3	–	13	.188	13	–	18	.419
Alabama	2	–	14	.125	13	–	19	.406
† 2015 SEC tournament winner Rankings from AP poll

The 2014–15 Mississippi State Lady Bulldogs basketball team represented Mississippi State University during the 2014–15 NCAA Division I women's basketball season college basketball season. The Lady Bulldogs were led by third year head coach Vic Schaefer. They played their home games at Humphrey Coliseum and were members of the Southeastern Conference. They finished the season 27–7, 11–5 in SEC play to finish in third place. They lost in the quarterfinals of the SEC women's tournament to Kentucky. They received at-large bid to the NCAA women's tournament, where they defeated Tulane in the first round before losing to Duke in the second round.

== Roster ==
2014–15 Mississippi State Bulldogs women's basketball team
Players
Coaches

Pos.	#	Name	Height	Year	Previous school	Hometown
G	00	Dominique Dillingham	5 ft 9 in (1.75 m)	So	Klein Collins HS	Spring, TX
G	1	Blair Schaefer	5 ft 7 in (1.7 m)	Fr	Starkville HS	Starkville, MS
G	2	Morgan William	5 ft 5 in (1.65 m)	Fr	Shades Valley HS	Birmingham, AL
F	3	Breanna Richardson	6 ft 1 in (1.85 m)	So	Rockdale County HS	Conyers, GA
F	5	Sherise Williams	6 ft 1 in (1.85 m)	Jr	McCluer HS	St. Louis, MO
C	10	Martha Alwal	6 ft 4 in (1.93 m)	Sr	Worthington HS	Worthington, MN
F	13	Ketara Chapel	6 ft 1 in (1.85 m)	So	Temple HS	Temple, TX
G	14	Kendra Grant	5 ft 11 in (1.8 m)	Sr	Richland HS	Richland, MS
G	21	Jerica James	5 ft 5 in (1.65 m)	Sr	North Little Rock HS	Wynne, AR
G	23	Kayla Nevitt	5 ft 10 in (1.78 m)	Fr	Andy Dekaney HS	Houston, TX
F	35	Victoria Vivians	6 ft 1 in (1.85 m)	Fr	Scott Central HS	Forest, MS
F	44	LaKaris Salter	6 ft 1 in (1.85 m)	Fr	FAMU DRS	Tallahassee, FL
C	45	Chinwe Okorie	6 ft 5 in (1.96 m)	So	Stoneleigh-Burnham Prep	Lagos, Nigeria
G	51	Savannah Carter	5 ft 9 in (1.75 m)	Sr	Trinity Valley CC	Tulsa, OK

Head coach

Vic Schaefer

Assistant coach(es)

Johnnie Harris
Aqua Franklin
Elena Lovato

Legend

- (C) Team captain
- (S) Suspended
- (I) Ineligible
- (W) Walk-on
- Injured
- Current redshirt

Roster
Last update: 2014-10-04

== Schedule ==
Date time, TV	Rank^{#}	Opponent^{#}	Result	Record	Site (attendance) city, state
Exhibition
Nov 9, 2014*; 2:00 p.m.		Arkansas–Fort Smith	W 114–58	–	Humphrey Coliseum (973); Starkville, MS
Non-conference regular season
Nov 14, 2014*; 8:00 p.m.		Mercer; Preseason WNIT First Round	W 92–60	1–0	Humphrey Coliseum (2,531); Starkville, MS
Nov 16, 2014*; 6:00 p.m.		Arkansas State; Preseason WNIT Second Round	W 93–83	2–0	Humphrey Coliseum (2,011); Starkville, MS
Nov 20, 2014*; 7:00 p.m.		No. 17 West Virginia; Preseason WNIT Semifinals	W 74–61	3–0	Humphrey Coliseum (2,502); Starkville, MS
Nov 23, 2014*; 2:00 p.m., CBSSN		WKU; Preseason WNIT Championship	W 88–77	4–0	Humphrey Coliseum (3,773); Starkville, MS
Nov 25, 2014*; 7:00 p.m.	No. 25	Louisiana–Monroe	W 80–46	5–0	Humphrey Coliseum (2,954); Starkville, MS
Nov 29, 2014*; 2:00 p.m.	No. 25	at New Orleans	W 85–45	6–0	Lakefront Arena (284); New Orleans, LA
Dec 2, 2014*; 7:00 p.m.	No. 23	North Dakota State	W 109–58	7–0	Humphrey Coliseum (2,659); Starkville, MS
Dec 7, 2014*; 2:00 p.m.	No. 23	Southeastern Louisiana	W 97–36	8–0	Humphrey Coliseum (3,020); Starkville, MS
Dec 11, 2014*; 7:00 p.m.	No. 22	Louisiana Tech	W 81–77	9–0	Humphrey Coliseum (3,012); Starkville, MS
Dec 14, 2014*; 2:00 p.m., ASN	No. 22	at Southern Miss	W 73–46	10–0	Reed Green Coliseum (2,561); Hattiesburg, MS
Dec 15, 2014*; 7:00 p.m.	No. 21	Mississippi Valley State	W 104–41	11–0	Humphrey Coliseum (3,011); Starkville, MS
Dec 17, 2014*; 11:00 a.m.	No. 21	at Louisiana–Lafayette	W 66–51	12–0	Earl K. Long Gymnasium (1,656); Lafayette, LA
Dec 20, 2014*; 9:30 p.m.	No. 21	vs. UIC; Las Vegas Holiday Hoops Classic	W 73–36	13–0	South Point Arena (150); Las Vegas, NV
Dec 21, 2014*; 4:00 p.m.	No. 21	vs. Miami (OH); Las Vegas Holiday Hoops Classic	W 68–42	14–0	South Point Arena (175); Las Vegas, NV
Dec 29, 2014*; 7:00 p.m.	No. 17	Arkansas–Pine Bluff	W 83–26	15–0	Humphrey Coliseum (2,955); Starkville, MS
SEC regular season
Jan 2, 2015; 3:00 p.m.	No. 17	No. 19 Georgia	W 64–56	16–0 (1–0)	Humphrey Coliseum (4,114); Starkville, MS
Jan 4, 2015; 2:00 p.m.	No. 17	at Missouri	W 53–47	17–0 (2–0)	Mizzou Arena (1,432); Columbia, MO
Jan 8, 2015; 8:00 p.m., FSN	No. 14	Arkansas	W 72–57	18–0 (3–0)	Humphrey Coliseum (3,556); Starkville, MS
Jan 11, 2015; 2:00 p.m.	No. 14	at Vanderbilt	L 62–78	18–1 (3–1)	Memorial Gymnasium (3,690); Nashville, TN
Jan 15, 2015; 7:00 p.m.	No. 15	LSU	L 69–71 ^{2OT}	18–2 (3–2)	Humphrey Coliseum (4,727); Starkville, MS
Jan 18, 2015; 3:00 p.m., FSN	No. 15	Alabama	W 66–50	19–2 (4–2)	Humphrey Coliseum (4,557); Starkville, MS
Jan 22, 2015; 8:00 p.m., SECN	No. 18	at Ole Miss	W 64–62	20–2 (5–2)	Tad Smith Coliseum (3,383); Oxford, MS
Jan 26, 2015; 8:00 p.m., SECN	No. 18	at Auburn	W 59–48	21–2 (6–2)	Auburn Arena (1,787); Auburn, AL
Jan 29, 2015; 7:00 p.m.	No. 18	Vanderbilt	W 69–44	22–2 (7–2)	Humphrey Coliseum (5,056); Starkville, MS
Feb 1, 2015; 2:00 p.m., SECN	No. 18	at No. 6 Tennessee	L 67–79	22–3 (7–3)	Thompson–Boling Arena (11,507); Knoxville, TN
Feb 8, 2015; 2:00 p.m., SECN	No. 17	No. 14 Texas A&M	W 63–61 ^{OT}	23–3 (8–3)	Humphrey Coliseum (4,651); Starkville, MS
Feb 12, 2015; 6:00 p.m., SECN	No. 13	at No. 10 Kentucky	L 90–92 ^{2OT}	23–4 (8–4)	Memorial Coliseum (5,100); Lexington, KY
Feb 15, 2015; 3:00 p.m., SECN	No. 13	Florida	W 75–62	24–4 (9–4)	Humphrey Coliseum (5,183); Starkville, MS
Feb 22, 2015; 2:00 p.m.	No. 14	at Alabama	W 57–55	25–4 (10–4)	Foster Auditorium (3,133); Tuscaloosa, AL
Feb 26, 2015; 6:00 p.m., FSN	No. 11	at No. 2 South Carolina	L 50–69	25–5 (10–5)	Colonial Life Arena (15,047); Columbia, SC
Mar 1, 2015; 1:00 p.m., FSN	No. 11	Ole Miss	W 55–47	26–5 (11–5)	Humphrey Coliseum (7,326); Starkville, MS
2015 SEC Tournament
Mar 6, 2015; 8:30 p.m., SECN	No. 11	vs. No. 12 Kentucky; Quarterfinals	L 67–76	26–6	Verizon Arena (4,189); North Little Rock, AR
NCAA Women's Tournament
Mar 20, 2015*; 2:39 p.m., ESPN2	No. 12	vs. Tulane; First Round	W 57–47	27–6	Cameron Indoor Stadium (2,712); Durham, NC
Mar 22, 2015*; 11:00 a.m., ESPN2	No. 12	at No. 16 Duke; Second Round	L 56–64	27–7	Cameron Indoor Stadium (2,293); Durham, NC
*Non-conference game. ^{#}Rankings from AP Poll. (#) Tournament seedings in parentheses. All times are in Central Time.

== Rankings ==
Ranking movement Legend: ██ Increase in ranking. ██ Decrease in ranking. NR = Not ranked. RV = Received votes.
Poll	Pre	Wk 2	Wk 3	Wk 4	Wk 5	Wk 6	Wk 7	Wk 8	Wk 9	Wk 10	Wk 11	Wk 12	Wk 13	Wk 14	Wk 15	Wk 16	Wk 17	Wk 18	Final
AP	RV	RV	25	23	22	21	19	17	14	15	18	18	17	13	14	11	11	12	12
Coaches	NR	RV	RV	25	22	20	19	17	15	18	20	18	19	15	16	13	13	14	14

== See also ==
2014–15 Mississippi State Bulldogs basketball team
