= 2014–15 South Carolina Gamecocks women's basketball team =

Intercollegiate basketball season

2014–15 South Carolina Gamecocks women's basketball

Junkanoo Jam Lucaya Division Champions SEC Regular Season co-champions SEC Tournament Champions NCAA Women's Tournament Greensboro Regional Champions

NCAA Women's Tournament, Final Four (lost to Notre Dame)
- Conference: Southeastern Conference

Ranking
- Coaches: No. 4
- AP: No. 3
- Record: 34–3 (15–1 SEC)
- Head coach: Dawn Staley (7th season)
- Assistant coaches: Lisa Boyer; Nikki McCray; Darius Taylor
- Home arena: Colonial Life Arena

2014–15 SEC women's basketball standings
	Conf.				Overall
Team	W		L	PCT	W		L	PCT
No. 3 South Carolina*^{†}	15	–	1	.938	34	–	3	.919
No. 6 Tennessee	15	–	1	.938	30	–	6	.833
No. 12 Mississippi State	11	–	5	.688	27	–	7	.794
No. 11 Kentucky	10	–	6	.625	24	–	10	.706
No. 21 Texas A&M	10	–	6	.625	23	–	10	.697
LSU	10	–	6	.625	17	–	14	.548
Missouri	7	–	9	.438	19	–	14	.576
Ole Miss	7	–	9	.438	19	–	14	.576
Georgia	6	–	10	.375	19	–	12	.613
Arkansas	6	–	10	.375	18	–	14	.563
Vanderbilt	5	–	11	.313	15	–	16	.484
Florida	5	–	11	.313	13	–	17	.433
Auburn	3	–	13	.188	13	–	18	.419
Alabama	2	–	14	.125	13	–	19	.406
† 2015 SEC tournament winner Rankings from AP poll

The 2014–15 South Carolina Gamecocks women's basketball team represented the University of South Carolina during the 2014–15 NCAA Division I women's basketball season. The Gamecocks, led by seventh year head coach Dawn Staley, played their home games at the Colonial Life Arena and were members of the Southeastern Conference. A’ja Wilson, the top-ranked recruit in the nation and a Columbia native, averaged 13.1 points and 6.6 rebounds per game and was named the National Freshman of the Year. The Gamecocks repeated as Southeastern Conference regular season Champions; however, it was shared with Tennessee this year. The 2014–15 Gamecocks won their first SEC Tournament Championship by beating Tennessee 62–46. USC received a #1 seed in the 2015 Women's NCAA Tournament where they advanced to the final four where they lost 66–65 to Notre Dame, as Tiffany Mitchell's desperation three in the final seconds came up short.

== Recruits ==
College recruiting information
Name	Hometown	School	Height	Weight	Commit date
A'ja Wilson; F	Hopkins, SC	Heathwood Hall Episcopal School	6 ft 1 in (1.85 m)	N/A	
A'ja Wilson; F	Recruit ratings: ESPN: (98)				
Jatarie White; P	Charlotte, NC	Providence Day School	6 ft 4 in (1.93 m)	N/A	
Jatarie White; P	Recruit ratings: ESPN: (98)				
Kaydra Duckett; G	Columbia, SC	Dreher	5 ft 10 in (1.78 m)	N/A	
Kaydra Duckett; G	Recruit ratings: ESPN: (97)				
Bianca Cuevas; PG	Bronx, NY	Nazareth Regional	5 ft 6 in (1.68 m)	N/A	
Bianca Cuevas; PG	Recruit ratings: ESPN: (97)				
Doniyah Cliney; G	Newark, NJ	Malcolm X. Shabazz	5 ft 6 in (1.68 m)	N/A	
Doniyah Cliney; G	Recruit ratings: ESPN: (90)				
Overall recruit ranking:
Note: In many cases, Scout, Rivals, 247Sports, On3, and ESPN may conflict in their listings of height and weight.; In these cases, the average was taken. ESPN grades are on a 100-point scale.; Sources: "2014 Player Commits". ESPN. Archived from the original on March 16, 2018.

== Roster ==
2014–15 South Carolina Gamecocks women's basketball team
Players
Coaches

Pos.	#	Name	Height	Year	Previous school	Hometown
G	0	India Farmer	6 ft 0 in (1.83 m)	So	North Myrtle Beach	North Myrtle Beach, S.C.
G	1	Bianca Cuevas	5 ft 6 in (1.68 m)	Fr	Nazareth Regional	Bronx, N.Y.
G	2	Olivia Gaines	5 ft 7 in (1.7 m)	Sr	Louisburg College (N.C.)	Chester, S.C.
G	3	Kaydra Duckett	5 ft 8 in (1.73 m)	Fr	Dreher	Columbia, S.C.
G	4	Doniyah Cliney	6 ft 0 in (1.83 m)	Fr	Malcolm X Shabazz	Newark, N.J.
G	5	Khadijah Sessions	5 ft 8 in (1.73 m)	Jr	Myrtle Beach	Myrtle Beach, S.C.
G	15	Tiffany Davis	5 ft 7 in (1.7 m)	RS So	Westbury Christian	Houston, Texas
G/F	22	A'ja Wilson	6 ft 5 in (1.96 m)	Fr	Heathwood Hall	Hopkins, S.C.
G	23	Tina Roy	5 ft 11 in (1.8 m)	RS Jr	Kaplan	Kaplan, La.
F	24	Aleighsa Welch	6 ft 0 in (1.83 m)	Sr	Goose Creek	Goose Creek, S.C.
G	25	Tiffany Mitchell	5 ft 9 in (1.75 m)	Jr	Providence Day	Charlotte, N.C.
G/F	31	Asia Dozier	6 ft 0 in (1.83 m)	Jr	Spring Valley	Columbia, S.C.
C	33	Elem Ibiam	6 ft 4 in (1.93 m)	Sr	Fayette County	Fayetteville, Ga.
F	40	Jatarie White	6 ft 4 in (1.93 m)	Fr	Providence Day	Charlotte, N.C.
C	41	Alaina Coates	6 ft 4 in (1.93 m)	So	Dutch Fork	Irmo, S.C.

Head coach

Dawn Staley

Assistant coach(es)

Lisa Boyer
Nikki McCray
Darius Taylor

Legend

- (C) Team captain
- (S) Suspended
- (I) Ineligible
- (W) Walk-on
- Injured
- Current redshirt

Roster
Last update: 2014-10-08

== Schedule ==
Date time, TV	Rank^{#}	Opponent^{#}	Result	Record	Site (attendance) city, state
Exhibition
Nov 2, 2014*; 3:00 p.m.	No. 2	Coker	W 100–25	–	Colonial Life Arena (N/A); Columbia, SC
Non-conference Regular Season
Nov 15, 2014*; 7:00 p.m.	No. 2	Southern California	W 70–61	1–0	Colonial Life Arena (10,057); Columbia, SC
Nov 20, 2014*; 7:00 p.m., SECN	No. 2	Clemson; Battle of the Palmetto State	W 99–41	2–0	Colonial Life Arena (11,012); Columbia, SC
Nov 23, 2014*; 3:00 p.m.	No. 2	San Diego State	W 89–38	3–0	Colonial Life Arena (10,301); Columbia, SC
Nov 27, 2014*; 4:15 p.m.	No. 1	vs. Wisconsin; Junkanoo Jam semifinals	W 67–44	4–0	St. George HS Gymnasium (167); Freeport, BAH
Nov 28, 2014*; 8:00 p.m.	No. 1	vs. No. 22 Syracuse; Junkanoo Jam Championship	W 67–63	5–0	St. George HS Gymnasium (342); Freeport, BAH
Dec 1, 2014*; 7:00 p.m.	No. 1	North Carolina Central	W 90–26	6–0	Colonial Life Arena (8,823); Columbia, SC
Dec 4, 2014*; 8:00 p.m., SECN	No. 1	Charlotte	W 82–61	7–0	Colonial Life Arena (9,629); Columbia, SC
Dec 7, 2014*; 1:00 p.m., ESPN2	No. 1	at No. 9 Duke	W 51–50	8–0	Cameron Indoor Stadium (6,004); Durham, NC
Dec 14, 2014*; Noon	No. 1	Savannah State	W 111–49	9–0	Colonial Life Arena (9,605); Columbia, SC
Dec 17, 2014*; 7:00 p.m.	No. 1	at Hampton	W 69–49	10–0	Hampton Convocation Center (4,000); Hampton, VA
Dec 20, 2014*; 1:00 p.m.	No. 1	vs. Central Michigan; Subway Classic	W 80–45	11–0	Williams Arena (N/A); Minneapolis, MN
Dec 21, 2014*; 1:00 p.m.	No. 1	vs. Liberty; Subway Classic	W 84–44	12–0	Williams Arena (N/A); Minneapolis, MN
SEC Regular Season
Jan 2, 2015; 7:00 p.m., SECN	No. 1	Auburn	W 77–58	13–0 (1–0)	Colonial Life Arena (16,465); Columbia, SC
Jan 4, 2015; 3:00 p.m., ESPN2	No. 1	at LSU	W 75–51	14–0 (2–0)	Maravich Center (3,438); Baton Rouge, LA
Jan 8, 2015; 7:00 p.m.	No. 1	at Alabama	W 102–59	15–0 (3–0)	Foster Auditorium (2,454); Tuscaloosa, AL
Jan 11, 2015; 1:00 p.m., ESPN2	No. 1	No. 10 Kentucky	W 68–60	16–0 (4–0)	Colonial Life Arena (17,156); Columbia, SC
Jan 15, 2015; 9:00 p.m., SECN	No. 1	at Missouri	W 60–49	17–0 (5–0)	Mizzou Arena (1,440); Columbia, SC
Jan 19, 2015; 7:00 p.m., SECN	No. 1	at Florida	W 77–42	18–0 (6–0)	O'Connell Center (1,503); Gainesville, FL
Jan 26, 2015; 7:00 p.m., ESPN2	No. 1	No. 12 Texas A&M	W 79–61	19–0 (7–0)	Colonial Life Arena (13,546); Columbia, SC
Jan 29, 2015; 7:00 p.m.	No. 1	Alabama	W 85–54	20–0 (8–0)	Colonial Life Arena (11,927); Columbia, SC
Feb 1, 2015; 4:30 p.m., ESPNU	No. 1	at Ole Miss	W 77–59	21–0 (9–0)	Tad Smith Coliseum (1,935); Oxford, MS
Feb 5, 2015; 7:00 p.m., SECN	No. 1	at No. 22 Georgia	W 58–35	22–0 (10–0)	Stegeman Coliseum (4,896); Athens, GA
Feb 9, 2015*; 8:00 p.m., ESPN2	No. 1	at No. 2 Connecticut	L 62–87	22–1	Gampel Pavilion (10,167); Storrs, CT
Feb 12, 2015; 7:00 p.m., FSN	No. 1	LSU	W 86–62	23–1 (11–0)	Colonial Life Arena (12,342); Columbia, SC
Feb 15, 2015; Noon, ESPNU	No. 1	Vanderbilt	W 89–59	24–1 (12–0)	Colonial Life Arena (15,255); Columbia, SC
Feb 19, 2015; 9:00 p.m., SECN	No. 2	at Arkansas	W 73–56	25–1 (13–0)	Bud Walton Arena (1,531); Fayetteville, AR
Feb 23, 2015; 9:00 p.m., ESPN2	No. 2	No. 6 Tennessee	W 71–66	26–1 (14–0)	Colonial Life Arena (14,390); Columbia, SC
Feb 26, 2015; 7:00 p.m., FSN	No. 2	No. 11 Mississippi State	W 69–50	27–1 (15–0)	Colonial Life Arena (15,047); Columbia, SC
Mar 1, 2015; 5:00 p.m., ESPN2	No. 2	at No. 13 Kentucky	L 56–67	27–2 (15–1)	Memorial Coliseum (7,560); Lexington, KY
SEC Tournament
Mar 6, 2015; 1:00 p.m., SECN	No. 3	vs. Arkansas; Quarterfinals	W 58–36	28–2	Verizon Arena (N/A); North Little Rock, AR
Mar 7, 2015; 5:00 p.m., ESPNU	No. 3	vs. LSU; Semifinals	W 74–54	29–2	Verizon Arena (N/A); North Little Rock, AR
Mar 8, 2015; 3:30 p.m., ESPN	No. 3	vs. No. 5 Tennessee; Championship Game	W 62–46	30–2	Verizon Arena (5,819); North Little Rock, AR
NCAA Women's Tournament
Mar 20, 2015*; 5:00 p.m., ESPN2	No. 3	Savannah State; First Round	W 81–48	31–2	Colonial Life Arena (10,644); Columbia, SC
Mar 22, 2015*; 7:00 p.m., ESPN	No. 3	Syracuse; Second Round	W 97–68	32–2	Colonial Life Arena (10,485); Columbia, SC
Mar 27, 2015*; 7:00 p.m., ESPN	No. 3	vs. No. 15 North Carolina; Sweet Sixteen	W 67–65	33–2	Greensboro Coliseum (N/A); Greensboro, NC
Mar 29, 2015*; 12:00 p.m., ESPN	No. 3	vs. No. 7 Florida State; Elite Eight	W 80–74	34–2	Greensboro Coliseum (6,364); Greensboro, NC
Apr 5, 2015*; 6:30 p.m., ESPN	No. 3	vs. No. 2 Notre Dame; Final Four	L 65–66	34–3	Amalie Arena (19,730); Tampa, FL
*Non-conference game. ^{#}Rankings from AP Poll. (#) Tournament seedings in parentheses. All times are in Eastern Time.

== Rankings ==
Ranking movement Legend: ██ Increase in ranking. ██ Decrease in ranking. NR = Not ranked. RV = Received votes.
Poll	Pre	Wk 2	Wk 3	Wk 4	Wk 5	Wk 6	Wk 7	Wk 8	Wk 9	Wk 10	Wk 11	Wk 12	Wk 13	Wk 14	Wk 15	Wk 16	Wk 17	Wk 18	Final
AP	2	2	1	1	1	1	1	1	1	1	1	1	1	1	2	2	3	3	3
Coaches	2	3	2	2	1	1	1	1	1	1	1	1	1	2	2	2	4	4	4

== See also ==
2014–15 South Carolina Gamecocks men's basketball team
