= 2014–15 Southeastern Conference women's basketball season =

2014–15 SEC Women's Basketball Season
- League: NCAA Division I
- Sport: Basketball
- Teams: 14
- TV partner(s): ESPN2, SEC Network, FSN

WNBA Draft

Regular Season
- 2015 SEC Co-Champions: South Carolina, Tennessee

Tournament

Basketball seasons
- ← 2013–14 2015–16 →

2014–15 SEC women's basketball standings
	Conf.				Overall
Team	W		L	PCT	W		L	PCT
No. 3 South Carolina*^{†}	15	–	1	.938	34	–	3	.919
No. 6 Tennessee	15	–	1	.938	30	–	6	.833
No. 12 Mississippi State	11	–	5	.688	27	–	7	.794
No. 11 Kentucky	10	–	6	.625	24	–	10	.706
No. 21 Texas A&M	10	–	6	.625	23	–	10	.697
LSU	10	–	6	.625	17	–	14	.548
Missouri	7	–	9	.438	19	–	14	.576
Ole Miss	7	–	9	.438	19	–	14	.576
Georgia	6	–	10	.375	19	–	12	.613
Arkansas	6	–	10	.375	18	–	14	.563
Vanderbilt	5	–	11	.313	15	–	16	.484
Florida	5	–	11	.313	13	–	17	.433
Auburn	3	–	13	.188	13	–	18	.419
Alabama	2	–	14	.125	13	–	19	.406
† 2015 SEC tournament winner Rankings from AP poll

The 2014–15 SEC women's basketball season began with practices in October 2014, followed by the start of the 2014–15 NCAA Division I women's basketball season in November. Conference play started in early January 2015 and concluded in March, followed by the 2015 SEC women's basketball tournament at the Verizon Arena in North Little Rock, Arkansas.

== Preseason ==
	Media
1.	South Carolina (210)
2.	Tennessee
3.	Texas A&M
4.	Kentucky
5.	Vanderbilt
6.	Georgia
7.	LSU
8.	Mississippi State
9.	Florida
10.	Auburn
11.	Arkansas (tie)
11.	Missouri (tie)
13.	Alabama
14.	Ole Miss

=== Preseason All-SEC teams ===
Media
Martha Alwal Mississippi State
**Tiffany Mitchell South Carolina**
Aleighsa Welch South Carolina
Isabelle Harrison Tennessee
Courtney Walker Texas A&M

- Coaches select 5 players
- Players in bold are choices for SEC Player of the Year

== Rankings ==
Legend
Increase in ranking
Decrease in ranking
Not ranked previous week

		Pre	Wk 2	Wk 3	Wk 4	Wk 5	Wk 6	Wk 7	Wk 8	Wk 9	Wk 10	Wk 11	Wk 12	Wk 13	Wk 14	Wk 15	Wk 16	Wk 17	Wk 18	Final
Alabama	AP	NR	NR	NR	NR	NR	NR	NR	NR	NR	NR	NR	NR	NR	NR	NR	NR	NR	NR	NR
Alabama	C	NR	NR	NR	NR	NR	NR	NR	NR	NR	NR	NR	NR	NR	NR	NR	NR	NR	NR	NR
Arkansas	AP	RV	RV	RV	25т	RV	RV	RV	RV	RV	NR	NR	NR	NR	NR	NR	NR	NR	NR	NR
Arkansas	C	RV	NR	NR	RV	NR	NR	NR	NR	NR	NR	NR	NR	NR	NR	NR	NR	NR	NR	NR
Auburn	AP	NR	NR	NR	NR	NR	NR	NR	NR	NR	NR	NR	NR	NR	NR	NR	NR	NR	NR	NR
Auburn	C	NR	NR	NR	NR	NR	NR	NR	NR	NR	NR	NR	NR	NR	NR	NR	NR	NR	NR	NR
Florida	AP	NR	NR	NR	NR	NR	NR	NR	NR	NR	NR	NR	NR	NR	NR	NR	NR	NR	NR	NR
Florida	C	NR	NR	NR	NR	NR	NR	NR	NR	NR	NR	NR	NR	NR	NR	NR	NR	NR	NR	NR
Georgia	AP	RV	24т	22т	19	16	15	14	19	20	18	22	21	22	24	RV	NR	NR	NR	NR
Georgia	C	RV	RV	25	23	18	17	16	19	19	16	19	20	21	RV	RV	NR	NR	NR	NR
Kentucky	AP	11	13	9	13	8	8	12	11	10	10	14	10	11	10	11	13	12	11	11
Kentucky	C	10	9	10	13	8	8	13	11	11	11	14	10	12	10	10	15	11	11	11
LSU	AP	RV	NR	NR	NR	NR	NR	NR	NR	NR	NR	RV	RV	RV	RV	RV	NR	RV	RV	RV
LSU	C	24	NR	NR	NR	NR	NR	NR	NR	NR	NR	RV	RV	RV	RV	RV	NR	NR	NR	NR
Mississippi State	AP	RV	RV	25	23	22	21	19	17	14	15	18	18	17	13	14	11	11	12	12
Mississippi State	C	NR	RV	RV	25	22	20	19	17	15	18	20	18	19	15	16	13	13	14	14
Missouri	AP	NR	NR	NR	NR	NR	NR	NR	NR	NR	NR	NR	NR	NR	NR	NR	NR	NR	NR	NR
Missouri	C	NR	NR	NR	NR	NR	NR	NR	NR	NR	NR	NR	NR	NR	NR	NR	NR	NR	NR	NR
Ole Miss	AP	NR	NR	NR	NR	NR	NR	NR	NR	NR	NR	NR	NR	NR	NR	NR	NR	NR	NR	NR
Ole Miss	C	NR	NR	NR	NR	NR	NR	NR	NR	NR	NR	NR	NR	NR	NR	NR	NR	NR	NR	NR
South Carolina	AP	2	2	1	1	1	1	1	1	1	1	1	1	1	1	2	2	3	3	3
South Carolina	C	2	3	2	2	1	1	1	1	1	1	1	1	1	2	2	2	4	4	4
Tennessee	AP	4	4	4	14	11	11	8	8	7	6	5	6	6	6	6	6	5	6	6
Tennessee	C	4	5	5	14	13	11	12	9	9	6	7	6	6	6	6	6	5	5	5
Texas A&M	AP	5	5	7	5	4	4	5	5	9	11	10	12	14	15	15	12	18	21	21
Texas A&M	C	5	6	6	5	5	5	5	8	8	12	10	14	13	16	15	12	17	19	20
Vanderbilt	AP	RV	RV	RV	NR	NR	NR	NR	NR	NR	NR	NR	NR	NR	NR	NR	NR	NR	NR	NR
Vanderbilt	C	RV	RV	RV	RV	NR	NR	NR	NR	NR	NR	NR	NR	NR	NR	NR	NR	NR	NR	NR

== SEC regular season ==
=== Conference matrix ===
This table summarizes the head-to-head results between teams in conference play.

	Alabama	Arkansas	Auburn	Florida	Georgia	Kentucky	LSU	Mississippi State	Missouri	Ole Miss	South Carolina	Tennessee	Texas A&M	Vanderbilt
vs. Alabama	–	1–0	1–1	1–0	1–0	1–0	1–0	2–0	0–1	1–0	2–0	1–0	1–0	1–0
vs. Arkansas	0–1	–	0–2	1–0	0–1	1–0	0–1	1–0	1–1	1–1	1–0	1–0	2–0	1–0
vs. Auburn	1–1	2–0	–	1–0	1–1	1–0	1–0	1–0	1–0	1–0	1–0	1–0	1–0	0–1
vs. Florida	0–1	0–1	0–1	–	1–1	1–0	1–0	1–0	2–0	1–0	1–0	1–0	1–0	1–1
vs. Georgia	0–1	1–0	1–1	1–1	–	1–0	1–0	1–0	0–1	1–0	1–0	2–0	0–1	0–1
vs. Kentucky	0–1	0–1	0–1	0–1	0–1	–	1–0	0–1	0–1	1–1	1–1	2–0	1–0	0–1
vs. LSU	0–1	1–0	0–1	0–1	0–1	0–1	–	0–1	0–1	1–1	1–0	1–0	1–1	0–1
vs. Mississippi State	0–2	0–1	0–1	0–1	0–1	1–0	1–0	–	0–1	0–1	1–0	1–0	0–1	1–1
vs. Missouri	1–0	1–1	0–1	0–2	1–0	1–0	1–0	1–0	–	0–1	1–0	1–0	1–1	0–1
vs. Ole Miss	0–1	0–1	0–1	0–1	0–1	1–1	1–1	2–0	1–0	–	1–0	1–0	1–0	1–0
vs. South Carolina	0–2	0–1	0–1	0–1	0–1	1–1	0–2	0–1	0–1	0–1	–	0–1	0–1	0–1
vs. Tennessee	0–1	0–1	0–1	0–1	0–2	0–2	0–1	0–1	0–1	0–1	1–0	–	0–1	0–2
vs. Texas A&M	0–1	0–2	0–1	0–1	1–0	0–1	1–1	1–0	1–1	0–1	1–0	1–0	–	0–1
vs. Vanderbilt	0–1	0–1	1–0	1–1	1–0	1–0	1–0	1–1	1–0	0–1	1–0	2–0	1–0	–
Total	2–14	6–10	3–13	5–11	6–10	10–6	10–6	11–5	7–9	7–9	15–1	15–1	10–6	5–11

== Postseason ==
=== SEC tournament ===
- March 4–8, 2015 Southeastern Conference Basketball Tournament, Verizon Arena, North Little Rock, Arkansas

**2015 SEC women's basketball tournament seeds and results**
Seed	School	Conf.	Over.	Tiebreaker	First Round March 4	Second Round March 5	Quarterfinals March 6	Semifinals March 7	Championship March 8
1.	‡ **South Carolina**	15–1	27–2	1–0 vs. UT	BYE	BYE	vs. #9 Arkansas – **W 58–36**	vs. #4 LSU – **W 74–54**	vs. #2 Tennessee – **W 62–46**
2.	† **Tennessee**	15–1	25–4	0–1 vs. USC	BYE	BYE	vs. #10 Georgia – **W 75–41**	vs. #6 Kentucky – **W 75–64**	vs. #1 South Carolina – **L 46–62**
3.	† **Mississippi State**	11–5	26–5		BYE	BYE	vs. #6 Kentucky – **L 67–76**		
4.	† **LSU**	10–6	16–12	1–0 vs. UK, MSU; 1–1 vs. TAMU	BYE	BYE	vs. #5 Texas A&M – **W 71–65**	vs. #1 South Carolina – **L 54–74**	
5.	# **Texas A&M**	10–6	22–8	1–0 vs. UK; 1–1 vs. LSU; 0–1 vs. MSU	BYE	vs. #13 Auburn – **W 57–47**	vs. #4 LSU – **L 65–71**		
6.	# **Kentucky**	10–6	21–8	0–2 vs. TAMU, LSU	BYE	vs. #11 Vanderbilt – **W 67–61**	vs. #3 Mississippi State – **W 76–67**	vs. #2 Tennessee – **L 64–75**	
7.	# **Missouri**	7–9	17–12	1–0 vs. UM	BYE	vs. #10 Georgia – **L 64–75**			
8.	# **Ole Miss**	7–9	17–12	0–1 vs. MU	BYE	vs. #9 Arkansas – **L 61–72**			
9.	# **Arkansas**	6–10	16–12	1–0 vs. UGA	BYE	vs. #8 Ole Miss – **W 72–65**	vs. #1 South Carolina – **L 36–58**		
10.	# **Georgia**	6–10	18–11	0–1 vs. UArk	BYE	vs. #7 Missouri – **W 75–64**	vs. #2 Tennessee – **L 41–75**		
11.	**Vanderbilt**	5–11	14–15	1–1 vs. UF, MSU	vs. #14 Alabama – **W 66–56**	vs. #6 Kentucky – **L 61–67**			
12.	**Florida**	5–11	13–16	1–1 vs. VU; 0–1 vs. MSU	vs. #13 Auburn – **L 49–71**				
13.	**Auburn**	3–13	12–17		vs. #12 Florida – **W 71–49**	vs. #5 Texas A&M – **L 47–57**			
14.	**Alabama**	2–14	13–18		vs. #11 Vanderbilt – **L 56–66**				
‡ – SEC regular season champions, and tournament No. 1 seed. † – Received a double-bye in the conference tournament. # – Received a single-bye in the conference tournament. Overall records include all games played in the SEC tournament.

== Honors and awards ==
=== All-SEC awards and teams ===
**2015 SEC Women's Basketball Individual Awards**
Award	Recipient(s)
Player of the Year	**Tiffany Mitchell**, S. CAROLINA
Coach of the Year	**Vic Schaefer**, MISS. ST. **Dawn Staley**, S. CAROLINA
Defensive Player of the Year	**Jordan Jones**, TEXAS A&M
Freshman of the Year	**A'ja Wilson**, S. CAROLINA
Scholar-Athlete of the Year	**Aleighsa Welch**, S. CAROLINA
Sixth Player Award	**Jennifer O'Neill**, KENTUCKY

**2015 SEC Women's Basketball All-Conference Teams**
First Team	Second Team	All-Freshman Team	All-Defensive Team
Makayla Epps, Kentucky; Danielle Ballard, LSU; Tia Faleru, Ole Miss; Tiffany Mitchell, South Carolina; Aleighsa Welch, South Carolina; A'ja Wilson, South Carolina; Cierra Burdick, Tennessee; Isabelle Harrison, Tennessee; Courtney Walker, Texas A&M	Jessica Jackson, Arkansas; Jennifer O'Neill, Kentucky; Jordan Frericks, Missouri; Martha Alwal, Mississippi State; Victoria Vivians, Mississippi State; Alaina Coates, South Carolina; Jordan Jones, Texas A&M; Courtney Williams, Texas A&M	Haley Lorenzen, Florida; Mackenzie Engram, Georgia; Alexis Jennings, Kentucky; A'Queen Hayes, Ole Miss; Victoria Vivians, Mississippi State; Morgan William, Mississippi State; A'ja Wilson, South Carolina; Rebekah Dahlman, Vanderbilt	Linnae Harper, Kentucky; Danielle Ballard, LSU; Martha Alwal, Mississippi State; Alaina Coates, South Carolina; Jordan Jones, Texas A&M
