= 2014–15 Michigan State Spartans women's basketball team =

Intercollegiate basketball season

2014–15 Michigan State Spartans women's basketball
- Conference: Big Ten Conference
- Record: 16–15 (7–11 Big Ten)
- Head coach: Suzy Merchant (8th season)
- Assistant coaches: Amaka Agugua; NcKell Copeland; Mark Simons
- Home arena: Breslin Center

2014–15 Big Ten women's basketball standings
	Conf.				Overall
Team	W		L	PCT	W		L	PCT
No. 4 Maryland†	18	–	0	1.000	34	–	3	.919
No. 18 Iowa	14	–	4	.778	26	–	8	.765
No. 23 Ohio State	13	–	5	.722	24	–	11	.686
No. 22 Northwestern	12	–	6	.667	23	–	9	.719
Rutgers	12	–	6	.667	23	–	10	.697
Minnesota	11	–	7	.611	23	–	10	.697
Nebraska	10	–	8	.556	21	–	11	.656
Michigan	8	–	10	.444	20	–	15	.571
Michigan State	7	–	11	.389	16	–	15	.516
Illinois	6	–	12	.333	15	–	16	.484
Wisconsin	5	–	13	.278	9	–	20	.310
Indiana	4	–	14	.222	15	–	16	.484
Purdue	3	–	15	.167	11	–	20	.355
Penn State	3	–	15	.167	6	–	24	.200
† 2015 Big Ten tournament winner As of April 5, 2015; Rankings from AP poll

The 2014–15 Michigan State Spartans women's basketball team represented Michigan State University during the 2014–15 NCAA Division I women's basketball season. The Spartans, led by eighth year head coach Suzy Merchant, played their home games at the Breslin Center and were members of the Big Ten Conference. They finished the season 16–15, 7–11 in Big Ten play to finish in ninth place. They advanced to the quarterfinals of the Big Ten women's tournament, where they lost to Maryland. They did not participate in a postseason tournament for the first time since 2001.

== Roster ==
2014–15 Michigan State Spartans women's basketball team
Players
Coaches

Pos.	#	Name	Height	Year	Previous school	Hometown
G	1	Tori Jankoska	5 ft 8 in (1.73 m)	So	Freeland	Freeland, Mich.
G	2	Cara Miller	6 ft 1 in (1.85 m)	Jr	Divine Child	Farmington Hills, Mich.
G	3	Kiara Carter	5 ft 1 in (1.55 m)	Fr	Homewood Flossmoor	Homewood, Ill
C	4	Jasmine Hines	6 ft 3 in (1.91 m)	Sr	Central Lake	Central Lake, Mich.
G	10	Brannadais Agee	5 ft 11 in (1.8 m)	RS So	Cass Technical	Detroit, Mich.
G	11	Anna Morrissey	5 ft 10 in (1.78 m)	Sr	Stevenson	Lincolnshire, Ill.
G/F	21	Jasmine Lumpkin	6 ft 0 in (1.83 m)	Fr	Joliet Catholic Academy	Bolingbrook, Ill.
G	23	Aerial Powers	6 ft 0 in (1.83 m)	RS So	Detroit Country Day	Detroit, Mich.
G/F	24	Lexi Gussert	6 ft 0 in (1.83 m)	Fr	Forest Park	Crystal Falls, Mich.
F	25	Kendra Lumpkin	5 ft 11 in (1.8 m)	Sr	Plainfield North	Bolingbrook, Ill.
C	40	Madison Williams	6 ft 7 in (2.01 m)	RS Sr	Detroit Country Day	Berkley, Mich.
F	52	Becca Mills	6 ft 4 in (1.93 m)	Sr	Midland Dow	Midland, Mich.
F	55	Kennedy Johnson	6 ft 2 in (1.88 m)	Fr	Wildwood Catholic	Galloway, N.J.

Head coach

Suzy Merchant

Assistant coach(es)

Amaka Agugua
NcKell Copeland
Mark Simons

Legend

- (C) Team captain
- (S) Suspended
- (I) Ineligible
- (W) Walk-on
- Injured
- Current redshirt

Roster
Last update: 2014-11-05

== Schedule ==
Date time, TV	Rank^{#}	Opponent^{#}	Result	Record	Site (attendance) city, state
Exhibition
11/09/2014*; 4:00 pm	No. 14	Grand Valley State	W 70–51	–	Breslin Center (4,818); East Lansing, MI
Non-conference regular season
11/16/2014*; 2:00 pm	No. 14	Eastern Michigan	W 68–61	1–0	Breslin Center (5,311); East Lansing, MI
11/19/2014*; 7:00 pm, BTN	No. 15	No. 3 Notre Dame	L 63–71	1–1	Breslin Center (8,644); East Lansing, MI
11/23/2014*; 2:00 pm	No. 15	IUPUI	W 64–45	2–1	Breslin Center (5,200); East Lansing, MI
11/26/2014*; 7:30 pm	No. 16	Oakland	W 79–64	3–1	Breslin Center (5,396); East Lansing, MI
11/30/2014*; 2:00 pm	No. 16	Miami (OH)	W 85–39	4–1	Breslin Center (4,007); East Lansing, MI
12/04/2014*; 7:00 pm	No. 15	Georgia Tech; ACC–Big Ten Women's Challenge	W 79–73 ^{OT}	5–1	Breslin Center (6,636); East Lansing, MI
12/07/2014*; 4:00 pm, SECN	No. 15	at No. 19 Georgia	L 60–69	5–2	Stegeman Coliseum (3,524); Athens, GA
12/14/2014*; 3:00 pm	No. 19	at Loyola–Chicago	W 90–38	6–2	Joseph J. Gentile Arena (583); Chicago, IL
12/16/2014*; 7:00 pm	No. 18	Alcorn State	W 77–41	7–2	Breslin Center (5,243); East Lansing, MI
12/20/2014*; 4:00 pm	No. 18	vs. No. 9 Baylor; Florida Sunshine Classic	L 65–84	7–3	Worden Arena (755); Winter Haven, FL
12/21/2014*; 4:00 pm	No. 18	vs. No. 19 Syracuse; Florida Sunshine Classic	W 89–76	8–3	Worden Arena (502); Winter Haven, FL
Big Ten regular season
12/28/2014; 2:00 pm	No. 20	Northwestern	L 57–61	8–4 (0–1)	Breslin Center (8,128); East Lansing, MI
12/31/2014; 7:00 pm	No. 24	at Indiana	L 51–70	8–5 (0–2)	Assembly Hall (2,714); Bloomington, IN
01/04/2015; 2:00 pm, BTN	No. 24	at Michigan; Rivalry	L 65–74	8–6 (0–3)	Crisler Center (4,520); Ann Arbor, MI
01/08/2015; 8:30 pm, BTN		No. 19 Nebraska	L 67–71	8–7 (0–4)	Breslin Center (4,652); East Lansing, MI
01/11/2015; 3:00 pm		at Northwestern	L 70–77	8–8 (0–5)	Welsh-Ryan Arena (1,152); Evanston, IL
01/15/2015; 7:00 pm		Illinois	W 63–56	9–8 (1–5)	Breslin Center (4,419); East Lansing, MI
01/18/2015; 3:00 pm, ESPN2		No. 22 Iowa	L 50–52	9–9 (1–6)	Breslin Center (8,923); East Lansing, MI
01/22/2015; 7:00 pm, BTN		at No. 7 Maryland	L 56–85	9–10 (1–7)	Xfinity Center (5,012); College Park, MD
01/25/2015; 2:00 pm		Wisconsin	W 77–71	10–10 (2–7)	Breslin Center (7,560); East Lansing, MI
01/28/2014; 7:00 pm		Indiana	W 72–57	11–10 (3–7)	Breslin Center (4,800); East Lansing, MI
02/02/2015; 6:30 pm, BTN		at Ohio State	L 62–76	11–11 (3–8)	Value City Arena (4,234); Columbus, OH
02/05/2015; 7:00 pm		Michigan; Rivalry	L 59–72	11–12 (3–9)	Breslin Center (5,315); East Lansing, MI
02/08/2015; 3:00 pm		at Minnesota	L 79–86	11–13 (3–10)	Williams Arena (6,570); Minneapolis, MN
02/11/2015; 7:00 pm		at Penn State	W 74–67	12–13 (4–10)	Bryce Jordan Center (3,319); University Park, PA
02/16/2015; 7:00 pm, ESPN2		No. 5 Maryland	L 69–75	12–14 (4–11)	Breslin Center (5,562); East Lansing, MI
02/22/2015; 2:00 pm, ESPN2		No. 19 Rutgers	W 60–50	13–14 (5–11)	Breslin Center (8,110); East Lansing, MI
02/25/2015; 8:00 pm		at Illinois	W 67–65	14–14 (6–11)	State Farm Center (1,815); Champaign, IL
02/28/2015; 2:00 pm, BTN		at Purdue	W 61–56	15–14 (7–11)	Mackey Arena (7,030); West Lafayette, IN
Big Ten Women's Tournament
03/05/2015; 12:30 pm, BTN		vs. Michigan; Second Round/Rivalry	W 69–49	16–14	Sears Centre (N/A); Hoffman Estates, IL
03/06/2015; 12:30 pm, BTN		vs. No. 4 Maryland; Quarterfinals	L 60–70	16–15	Sears Centre (N/A); Hoffman Estates, IL
*Non-conference game. ^{#}Rankings from AP Poll. (#) Tournament seedings in parentheses. All times are in Pacific Time.

== Rankings ==
Ranking movement Legend: ██ Increase in ranking. ██ Decrease in ranking. NR = Not ranked. RV = Received votes.
Poll	Pre	Wk 2	Wk 3	Wk 4	Wk 5	Wk 6	Wk 7	Wk 8	Wk 9	Wk 10	Wk 11	Wk 12	Wk 13	Wk 14	Wk 15	Wk 16	Wk 17	Wk 18	Final
AP	14	15	16	15	19	21	20	24	NR	NR	NR	NR	NR	NR	NR	NR	NR	NR	NR
Coaches	15	17	17	16	21	18	22	RV	NR	NR	NR	NR	NR	NR	NR	NR	NR	NR	NR

== See also ==
2014–15 Michigan State Spartans men's basketball team
