= 2014–15 Illinois Fighting Illini women's basketball team =

Intercollegiate basketball season

2014–15 Illinois Fighting Illini women's basketball
- Conference: Big Ten Conference
- Record: 15–16 (6–12 Big Ten)
- Head coach: Matt Bollant
- Assistant coaches: Mike Divilbiss; Tianna Kirkland; LaKale Malone
- Home arena: State Farm Center

2014–15 Big Ten women's basketball standings
	Conf.				Overall
Team	W		L	PCT	W		L	PCT
No. 4 Maryland†	18	–	0	1.000	34	–	3	.919
No. 18 Iowa	14	–	4	.778	26	–	8	.765
No. 23 Ohio State	13	–	5	.722	24	–	11	.686
No. 22 Northwestern	12	–	6	.667	23	–	9	.719
Rutgers	12	–	6	.667	23	–	10	.697
Minnesota	11	–	7	.611	23	–	10	.697
Nebraska	10	–	8	.556	21	–	11	.656
Michigan	8	–	10	.444	20	–	15	.571
Michigan State	7	–	11	.389	16	–	15	.516
Illinois	6	–	12	.333	15	–	16	.484
Wisconsin	5	–	13	.278	9	–	20	.310
Indiana	4	–	14	.222	15	–	16	.484
Purdue	3	–	15	.167	11	–	20	.355
Penn State	3	–	15	.167	6	–	24	.200
† 2015 Big Ten tournament winner As of April 5, 2015; Rankings from AP poll

The 2014–15 Illinois Fighting Illini women's basketball team represented University of Illinois at Urbana–Champaign during the 2014–15 NCAA Division I women's basketball season. The Fighting Illini, led by third year head coach Matt Bollant, played their home games at the State Farm Center and were members of the Big Ten Conference. They finished the season 15–16, 6–12 in Big Ten play to finish in tenth place. They lost in the second round of the Big Ten women's tournament to Nebraska.

== 2014–15 Roster ==
2014–15 Illinois Fighting Illini women's basketball team
Players
Coaches

Pos.	#	Name	Height	Year	Previous school	Hometown
G	0	Sarah Hartwell	5 ft 10 in (1.78 m)	RS Jr	Bellarmine Prep	Tacoma, Wash.
G	2	Taylor Gleason	5 ft 8 in (1.73 m)	So	Goodrich	Grand Blanc, Mich.
G/F	3	Taylor Tuck	6 ft 0 in (1.83 m)	Sr	Bolingbrook	Bolingbrook, Ill.
F	5	Nia Oden	5 ft 10 in (1.78 m)	Sr	Christ The King	Brooklyn, N.Y.
G	10	Amarah Coleman	5 ft 11 in (1.8 m)	Fr	Homewood-Flossmoor	Bolingbrook, Ill.
G	12	Ashley McConnell	5 ft 9 in (1.75 m)	So	Fremd	Palatine, Ill.
G/F	13	Mikaala Shackelford	5 ft 10 in (1.78 m)	RS Fr	Hopkins	Plymouth, Minn.
G	15	Kyley Simmons	5 ft 7 in (1.7 m)	RS Jr	Lewis Central	Council Bluffs, Iowa
G	20	Brittany Carter	6 ft 0 in (1.83 m)	Sr	Incarnate Word Academy	St. Louis, Mo.
G	21	Brooke Kissinger	5 ft 7 in (1.7 m)	Fr	Minden	Minden, Neb.
G	22	Ivory Crawford	5 ft 10 in (1.78 m)	Sr	Proviso East	Chicago, Ill.
G	23	Alexis Smith	5 ft 9 in (1.75 m)	Sr	St. John the Baptist	Medford, N.Y.
G	25	Kennedy Cattenhead	5 ft 10 in (1.78 m)	RS Fr	Bolingbrook	Bolingbrook, Ill.
C	32	Chatrice White	6 ft 3 in (1.91 m)	Fr	Shelby-Rising City	Shelby, Neb.
F	34	Jacqui Grant	6 ft 3 in (1.91 m)	So	Maine South	Park Ridge, Ill.

Head coach

Matt Bollant

Assistant coach(es)

Mike Divilbiss
Tianna Kirkland
LaKale Malone

Legend

- (C) Team captain
- (S) Suspended
- (I) Ineligible
- (W) Walk-on
- Injured
- Current redshirt

Roster
Last update: 2014-09-14

== Schedule ==
Date time, TV	Rank^{#}	Opponent^{#}	Result	Record	Site (attendance) city, state
Exhibition
11/08/2014*; 2:00 pm		Millikin	W 108–38	–	State Farm Center (1,607); Champaign, IL
Non-conference regular season
11/14/2014*; 3:00 pm		IPFW	W 70–63	1–0	State Farm Center (1,283); Champaign, IL
11/18/2014*; 7:00 pm		Robert Morris	W 66–48	2–0	State Farm Center (1,171); Champaign, IL
11/20/2014*; 7:00 pm		Memphis	W 60–58	3–0	State Farm Center (1,250); Champaign, IL
11/23/2014*; 2:00 pm		Southern	W 62–42	4–0	State Farm Center (1,642); Champaign, IL
11/27/2014*; 5:00 pm		vs. No. 9 Kentucky; Paradise Jam tournament	W 77–71	5–0	Sports and Fitness Center (N/A); Saint Thomas, USVI
11/28/2014*; 7:15 pm		vs. South Florida; Paradise Jam Tournament	L 61–67	5–1	Sports and Fitness Center (N/A); Saint Thomas, USVI
11/29/2014*; 5:00 pm		vs. Oklahoma; Paradise Jam Tournament	L 76–78 ^{OT}	5–2	Sports and Fitness Center (N/A); Saint Thomas, USVI
12/03/2014*; 7:00 pm		Virginia; ACC–Big Ten Women's Challenge	W 86–63	6–2	State Farm Center (1,253); Champaign, IL
12/06/2014*; 2:05 pm		at Southern Illinois	W 86–42	7–2	SIU Arena (1,975); Carbondale, IL
12/09/2014*; 6:00 pm		at Seton Hall	L 72–82	7–3	Walsh Gymnasium (467); South Orange, NJ
12/13/2014*; 1:30 pm, ESPN3		at Valparaiso	W 80–58	8–3	Athletics–Recreation Center (408); Valparaiso, IN
12/22/2014*; 7:00 pm		Murray State	W 64–44	9–3	State Farm Center (1,892); Champaign, IL
Big Ten regular season
12/28/2014; 2:00 pm		Purdue	L 55–62	9–4 (0–1)	State Farm Center (2,548); Champaign, IL
01/04/2015; 1:00 pm		at Penn State	W 91–76	10–4 (1–1)	Bryce Jordan Center (3,933); University Park, PA
01/08/2015; 7:00 pm		No. 17 Iowa	W 73–61	11–4 (2–1)	State Farm Center (1,650); Champaign, IL
01/11/2015; 2:00 pm		No. 19 Nebraska	L 53–58	11–5 (2–2)	State Farm Center (3,263); Champaign, IL
01/15/2015; 6:00 pm		at Michigan State	L 56–63	11–6 (2–3)	Breslin Center (4,419); East Lansing, MI
01/18/2015; 1:00 pm		at No. 8 Maryland	L 54–74	11–7 (2–4)	Xfinity Center (6,191); College Park, MD
01/22/2015; 7:00 pm		Northwestern	L 67–68	11–8 (2–5)	State Farm Center (1,725); Champaign, IL
01/26/2015; 6:00 pm, BTN		at Michigan	L 57–70	11–9 (2–6)	Crisler Arena (1,780); Ann Arbor, MI
01/29/2015; 7:00 pm		at No. 15 Nebraska	L 57–59	11–10 (2–7)	Pinnacle Bank Arena (7,378); Lincoln, NE
02/01/2015; 2:00 pm		Wisconsin	L 62–73	11–11 (2–8)	State Farm Center (1,797); Champaign, IL
02/05/2015; 8:00 pm, BTN		Minnesota	W 95–69	12–11 (3–8)	State Farm Center (1,693); Champaign, IL
02/08/2015; 1:00 pm		Northwestern	L 58–64	12–12 (3–9)	Welsh-Ryan Arena (2,011); Evanston, IL
02/11/2015; 6:00 pm		at Indiana	L 58–85	12–13 (3–10)	Assembly Hall (2,236); Bloomington, IN
02/14/2015; 3:00 pm, BTN		Ohio State	W 66–55	13–13 (4–10)	State Farm Center (2,708); Champaign, IL
02/17/2015; 6:00 pm		at No. 21 Rutgers	L 56–80	13–14 (4–11)	The RAC (2,329); Piscataway, NJ
02/21/2015; 1:00 pm		at Purdue	W 47–46	14–14 (5–11)	Mackey Arena (6,348); West Lafayette, IN
02/25/2015; 7:00 pm		Michigan State	L 65–67	14–15 (5–12)	State Farm Center (1,815); Champaign, IL
02/28/2015; 11:00 am, BTN		Michigan	W 72–60	15–15 (6–12)	State Farm Center (2,989); Champaign, IL
Big Ten Women's tournament
03/05/2015; 6:00 pm, BTN		vs. Nebraska; Second Round	L 71–86	15–16	Sears Centre (N/A); Hoffman Estates, IL
*Non-conference game. ^{#}Rankings from AP Poll. (#) Tournament seedings in parentheses. All times are in Central Time.

== See also ==
2014–15 Illinois Fighting Illini men's basketball team
