= 2014–15 Iowa Hawkeyes women's basketball team =

Intercollegiate basketball season

2014–15 Iowa Hawkeyes women's basketball

Hawkeye Classic champions

NCAA tournament, Sweet Sixteen
- Conference: Big Ten Conference

Ranking
- Coaches: No. 15
- AP: No. 18
- Record: 26–8 (14–4 Big Ten)
- Head coach: Lisa Bluder (15th season)
- Assistant coaches: Jan Jensen; Jenni Fitzgerald; Lacey Goldwire
- Home arena: Carver–Hawkeye Arena

2014–15 Big Ten women's basketball standings
	Conf.				Overall
Team	W		L	PCT	W		L	PCT
No. 4 Maryland†	18	–	0	1.000	34	–	3	.919
No. 18 Iowa	14	–	4	.778	26	–	8	.765
No. 23 Ohio State	13	–	5	.722	24	–	11	.686
No. 22 Northwestern	12	–	6	.667	23	–	9	.719
Rutgers	12	–	6	.667	23	–	10	.697
Minnesota	11	–	7	.611	23	–	10	.697
Nebraska	10	–	8	.556	21	–	11	.656
Michigan	8	–	10	.444	20	–	15	.571
Michigan State	7	–	11	.389	16	–	15	.516
Illinois	6	–	12	.333	15	–	16	.484
Wisconsin	5	–	13	.278	9	–	20	.310
Indiana	4	–	14	.222	15	–	16	.484
Purdue	3	–	15	.167	11	–	20	.355
Penn State	3	–	15	.167	6	–	24	.200
† 2015 Big Ten tournament winner As of April 5, 2015; Rankings from AP poll

The 2014–15 Iowa Hawkeyes women's basketball team represented University of Iowa during the 2014–15 NCAA Division I women's basketball season. The Hawkeyes, led by fifteenth-year head coach Lisa Bluder, played their home games at the Carver–Hawkeye Arena and were members of the Big Ten Conference. They finished the season 26–8, 14–4 in Big Ten play to finish in second place. They advanced to the semifinals of the Big Ten women's basketball tournament, where they lost to Ohio State. They received an at-large bid to the NCAA women's tournament, where they defeated American in the first round, and Miami (FL) in the second round, before falling to Baylor in the sweet sixteen.

== Roster ==
2014–15 Iowa Hawkeyes women's basketball team
Players
Coaches

Pos.	#	Name	Height	Year	Previous school	Hometown
G	1	Alexa Kastanek	5 ft 10 in (1.78 m)	So	Southeast	Lincoln, Nebraska
G	2	Ally Disterhoft	6 ft 0 in (1.83 m)	So	West	Iowa City, Iowa
F	3	Claire Till	6 ft 0 in (1.83 m)	Jr	Wahlert	Dubuque, Iowa
F	4	Chase Coley	6 ft 3 in (1.91 m)	Fr	Washburn	Minneapolis, Minnesota
G	15	Whitney Jennings	5 ft 5 in (1.65 m)	Fr	Logansport	Logansport, Indiana
G	21	Melissa Dixon	5 ft 8 in (1.73 m)	Sr	Johnsburg	Johnsburg, Illinois
G	22	Samantha Logic	5 ft 9 in (1.75 m)	Sr	Racine J.I. Case	Racine, Wisconsin
F	23	Christina Buttenham	6 ft 0 in (1.83 m)	Fr	St. Mary Catholic Secondary	Hamilton, Ontario
F	25	Kali Peschel	6 ft 1 in (1.85 m)	Jr	Sauk Centre	Sauk Centre, Minnesota
G	33	Kathryn Reynolds	5 ft 7 in (1.7 m)	Sr	Mount Notre Dame	Cincinnati, Ohio
F	34	Carly Mohns	6 ft 1 in (1.85 m)	Fr	Brodhead	Brodhead, Wisconsin
F	40	Hailey Schneden	6 ft 2 in (1.88 m)	So	Assumption	Davenport, Iowa
C	45	Nicole Smith	6 ft 4 in (1.93 m)	Jr	Hononegah	Rockton, Illinois
C	51	Bethany Doolittle	6 ft 4 in (1.93 m)	Sr	Hill-Murray	Oakdale, Minnesota

Head coach

Lisa Bluder

Assistant coach(es)

Jan Jensen
Jenni Fitzgerald
Lacey Goldwire

Legend

- (C) Team captain
- (S) Suspended
- (I) Ineligible
- (W) Walk-on
- Injured
- Current redshirt

Roster
Last update: 2014-10-15

== Schedule ==
Date time, TV	Rank^{#}	Opponent^{#}	Result	Record	Site (attendance) city, state
Exhibition
11/09/2014*; 3:00 pm	No. 19	St. Ambrose	W 119–57	–	Carver–Hawkeye Arena (3,990); Iowa City, Iowa
Non-conference regular season
11/14/2014*; 6:00 pm	No. 19	USC Upstate	W 107–56	1–0	Carver–Hawkeye Arena (5,291); Iowa City, Iowa
11/16/2014*; 2:00 pm, MC22	No. 19	Robert Morris	W 85–67	2–0	Carver–Hawkeye Arena (4,030); Iowa City, Iowa
11/21/2014*; 7:00 pm, MC22	No. 18	Pepperdine; Hawkeye Classic semifinals	W 97–68	3–0	Carver–Hawkeye Arena (3,578); Iowa City, Iowa
11/22/2014*; 7:30 pm, MC22	No. 18	Dayton; Hawkeye Classic championship	W 90–83	4–0	Carver–Hawkeye Arena (3,381); Iowa City, Iowa
11/25/2014*; 7:00 pm, MC22	No. 17	Northern Iowa	W 73–45	5–0	Carver–Hawkeye Arena (3,711); Iowa City, Iowa
11/28/2014*; 3:00 pm	No. 17	vs. Arkansas; South Point Thanksgiving Shootout	L 67–77	5–1	South Point Arena (N/A); Enterprise, Nevada
11/29/2014*; 5:30 pm	No. 17	vs. Gonzaga; South Point Thanksgiving Shootout	W 79–67	6–1	South Point Arena (177); Enterprise, Nevada
12/04/2014*; 6:00 pm, ESPN3	No. 22	at No. 7 Louisville; ACC–Big Ten Women's Challenge	L 52–86	6–2	KFC Yum! Center (7,854); Louisville, Kentucky
12/07/2014*; 2:00 pm, MC22	No. 22	Colorado	W 78–63	7–2	Carver–Hawkeye Arena (6,061); Iowa City, Iowa
12/11/2014*; 7:00 pm, BTN	No. 24	Iowa State; Iowa Corn Cy-Hawk Series	W 76–67	8–2	Carver–Hawkeye Arena (4,902); Iowa City, Iowa
12/21/2014*; 2:00 pm, MC22	No. 23	at Drake	W 100–98	9–2	Knapp Center (3,130); Des Moines, Iowa
Big Ten regular season
12/28/2014; 2:00 pm	No. 23	Penn State	W 77–52	10–2 (1–0)	Carver–Hawkeye Arena (5,411); Iowa City, Iowa
01/04/2015; 11:00 am, BTN	No. 20	at No. 16 Rutgers	W 79–72	11–2 (2–0)	Louis Brown Athletic Center (2,542); Piscataway, New Jersey
01/08/2015; 7:00 pm	No. 17	at Illinois	L 61–73	11–3 (2–1)	State Farm Center (1,650); Champaign, Illinois
01/11/2015; 1:00 pm, BTN	No. 17	Purdue	W 73–59	12–3 (3–1)	Carver–Hawkeye Arena (7,359); Iowa City, Iowa
01/14/2015; 7:00 pm	No. 22	Northwestern	W 83–70	13–3 (4–1)	Carver–Hawkeye Arena (4,027); Iowa City, Iowa
01/18/2015; 2:00 pm, ESPN2	No. 22	at Michigan State	W 52–50	14–3 (5–1)	Breslin Center (8,923); East Lansing, Michigan
01/22/2015; 8:00 pm, BTN	No. 20	Michigan	W 76–70	15–3 (6–1)	Carver–Hawkeye Arena (3,584); Iowa City, Iowa
01/26/2015; 8:00 pm, BTN	No. 20	No. 15 Nebraska	W 78–72 ^{OT}	16–3 (7–1)	Carver–Hawkeye Arena (4,489); Iowa City, Iowa
01/29/2015; 7:00 pm	No. 20	at Northwestern	W 102–99	17–3 (8–1)	Welsh-Ryan Arena (987); Evanston, Illinois
02/01/2015; 3:00 pm, ESPN2	No. 20	at No. 5 Maryland	L 88–93	17–4 (8–2)	Xfinity Center (5,373); College Park, Maryland
02/05/2015; 7:00 pm	No. 16	Ohio State	W 73–65	18–4 (9–2)	Carver–Hawkeye Arena (4,572); Iowa City, Iowa
02/08/2015; 2:00 pm	No. 16	at Wisconsin	W 87–75	19–4 (10–2)	Kohl Center (11,428); Madison, Wisconsin
02/12/2015; 8:00 pm, BTN	No. 14	at No. 22 Nebraska	W 69–61	20–4 (11–2)	Pinnacle Bank Arena (5,260); Lincoln, Nebraska
02/15/2015; 5:00 pm	No. 14	Indiana	W 81–64	21–4 (12–2)	Carver–Hawkeye Arena (8,748); Iowa City, Iowa
02/17/2015; 7:00 pm, BTN	No. 13	at Minnesota	L 80–93	21–5 (12–3)	Williams Arena (3,265); Minneapolis, Minnesota
02/21/2015; 6:00 pm, BTN	No. 13	at Ohio State	L 82–100	21–6 (12–4)	Value City Arena (6,471); Columbus, Ohio
02/26/2015; 7:00 pm	No. 17	Wisconsin	W 78–74	22–6 (13–4)	Carver–Hawkeye Arena (4,536); Iowa City, Iowa
03/01/2015; 2:00 pm, BTN	No. 17	Minnesota	W 92–76	23–6 (14–4)	Carver–Hawkeye Arena (9,726); Iowa City, Iowa
Big Ten Conference Women's Tournament
03/06/2015; 6:00 pm, BTN	No. 14	vs. Nebraska; Quarterfinals	W 74–65	24–6	Sears Centre (N/A); Hoffman Estates, Illinois
03/07/2015; 8:30 pm, BTN	No. 14	vs. Ohio State; Semifinals	L 85–91 ^{OT}	24–7	Sears Centre (5,642); Hoffman Estates, Illinois
NCAA Women's Tournament
03/20/2015*; 1:30 pm, ESPN2	No. 18	American; First Round	W 75–67	25–7	Carver–Hawkeye Arena (4,429); Iowa City, Iowa
03/22/2015*; 11:00 am, ESPN2	No. 18	Miami (FL); Second Round	W 88–70	26–7	Carver–Hawkeye Arena (7,220); Iowa City, Iowa
03/27/2015*; 6:30 pm, ESPN2	No. 18	vs. No. 5 Baylor; Sweet Sixteen	L 66–81	26–8	Chesapeake Energy Arena (N/A); Oklahoma City, Oklahoma
*Non-conference game. ^{#}Rankings from AP Poll. (#) Tournament seedings in parentheses. All times are in Central Time.

== Rankings ==
Ranking movement Legend: ██ Increase in ranking. ██ Decrease in ranking. NR = Not ranked. RV = Received votes.
Poll	Pre	Wk 2	Wk 3	Wk 4	Wk 5	Wk 6	Wk 7	Wk 8	Wk 9	Wk 10	Wk 11	Wk 12	Wk 13	Wk 14	Wk 15	Wk 16	Wk 17	Wk 18	Final
AP	19	18т	17	22	24	23	23	20	17	22	20	20	16	14	13	17	14	18	18
Coaches	19	18	16	19	24	24	20	20	17	21	18	17	17	13	11	16	15	15	15

== See also ==
- 2014–15 Iowa Hawkeyes men's basketball team
