= 2015 Big Ten women's basketball tournament =

- Classification: Division I
- Season: 2014–15
- Teams: 14
- Site: Sears Centre; Hoffman Estates, IL
- Champions: Maryland Terrapins (1st title)
- Winning coach: Brenda Frese (1st title)
- MVP: Lexie Brown (Maryland)
- Attendance: 21,706
- Television: Big Ten Network and ESPN

2014–15 Big Ten women's basketball standings
	Conf.				Overall
Team	W		L	PCT	W		L	PCT
No. 4 Maryland†	18	–	0	1.000	34	–	3	.919
No. 18 Iowa	14	–	4	.778	26	–	8	.765
No. 23 Ohio State	13	–	5	.722	24	–	11	.686
No. 22 Northwestern	12	–	6	.667	23	–	9	.719
Rutgers	12	–	6	.667	23	–	10	.697
Minnesota	11	–	7	.611	23	–	10	.697
Nebraska	10	–	8	.556	21	–	11	.656
Michigan	8	–	10	.444	20	–	15	.571
Michigan State	7	–	11	.389	16	–	15	.516
Illinois	6	–	12	.333	15	–	16	.484
Wisconsin	5	–	13	.278	9	–	20	.310
Indiana	4	–	14	.222	15	–	16	.484
Purdue	3	–	15	.167	11	–	20	.355
Penn State	3	–	15	.167	6	–	24	.200
† 2015 Big Ten tournament winner As of April 5, 2015; Rankings from AP poll

The 2015 Big Ten women's basketball tournament was held from March 4–8, 2015 at the Sears Centre in Hoffman Estates, IL.

== Seeds ==
All 14 Big Ten schools participate in the tournament. Teams were seeded by 2014–15 Big Ten Conference season record. The top 10 teams received a first-round bye and the top 4 teams received a double bye.

Seeding for the tournament was determined at the close of the regular conference season:

Seed	School	Conf	Tiebreak 1	Tiebreak 2
#1	Maryland	18–0		
#2	Iowa	14-4		
#3	Ohio State	13-5		
#4	Northwestern	12-6	1-0 vs. Rutgers	
#5	Rutgers	12-6	0-1 vs. Northwestern	
#6	Minnesota	11-7		
#7	Nebraska	10-8		
#8	Michigan	8–10		
#9	Michigan State	7–11		
#10	Illinois	6–12		
#11	Wisconsin	5-13		
#12	Indiana	4-14		
#13	Penn State	3-15	1-0 vs. Purdue	
#14	Purdue	3-15	0-1 vs. Penn State	

== Schedule ==
Session	Game	Time*	Matchup^{#}	Television	Score
First round - Wednesday, March 4
1	1	5:00 pm	#13 Penn State vs. #12 Indiana		63-68
1	2	7:30 pm	#14 Purdue vs. #11 Wisconsin		58-56
Second round - Thursday, March 5
2	3	11:30 am	#9 Michigan State vs. #8 Michigan	BTN	69-49
2	4	2:00 pm	#12 Indiana vs. #5 Rutgers	BTN	52-63
3	5	6:00 pm	#10 Illinois vs. #7 Nebraska	BTN	71-86
3	6	8:30 pm	#14 Purdue vs. #6 Minnesota	BTN	78-82
Quarterfinals - Friday, March 6
4	7	11:30 am	#9 Michigan State vs. #1 Maryland	BTN	60-70
4	8	2:00 pm	#5 Rutgers vs. #4 Northwestern	BTN	57-62
5	9	6:00 pm	#7 Nebraska vs. #2 Iowa	BTN	65-74
5	10	8:30 pm	#6 Minnesota vs. #3 Ohio State	BTN	71-83
Semifinals - Saturday, March 7
6	11	6:00 pm	#4 Northwestern vs. #1 Maryland	BTN	63-74
6	12	8:30 pm	#3 Ohio State vs. #2 Iowa	BTN	91-85 OT
Championship - Sunday, March 8
7	13	6:00pm	#3 Ohio State vs. #1 Maryland	ESPN	74-77

*Game times in Central Time. #Rankings denote tournament seeding.

== Bracket ==
First round Wednesday, March 4
12	Indiana	68
13	Penn State	63
11	Wisconsin	56
14	Purdue	58

Second round Thursday, March 5 BTN
8	Michigan	49
9	Michigan State	69
5	Rutgers	63
12	Indiana	52
7	Nebraska	86
10	Illinois	71
6	Minnesota	82
14	Purdue	78

Quarterfinals; Friday, March 6 BTN
1	Maryland	70
9	Michigan State	60
4	Northwestern	62
5	Rutgers	57
2	Iowa	74
7	Nebraska	65
3	Ohio State	83
6	Minnesota	71

Semifinals; Saturday, March 7 BTN
1	Maryland	74
4	Northwestern	63
2	Iowa	85
3	Ohio State	91^{OT}

Championship; Sunday, March 8 ESPN
1	Maryland	77
3	Ohio State	74

== All-Tournament Team ==
- Lexie Brown, Guard, Maryland (Most Outstanding Player)
- Bethany Doolittle, Center, Iowa
- Alexa Hart, Forward, Ohio State
- Kelsey Mitchell, Guard, Ohio State
- Amanda Zahui B., Center, Minnesota

== See also ==
- 2015 Big Ten Conference men's basketball tournament
