= 2014–15 Michigan Wolverines women's basketball team =

Intercollegiate basketball season

2014–15 Michigan Wolverines women's basketball

WNIT, Semifinals
- Conference: Big Ten Conference
- Record: 20–15 (8–10 Big Ten)
- Head coach: Kim Barnes Arico (3rd season)
- Assistant coaches: Melanie Moore; Megan Duffy; Joy McCorvey
- Home arena: Crisler Center

2014–15 Big Ten women's basketball standings
	Conf.				Overall
Team	W		L	PCT	W		L	PCT
No. 4 Maryland†	18	–	0	1.000	34	–	3	.919
No. 18 Iowa	14	–	4	.778	26	–	8	.765
No. 23 Ohio State	13	–	5	.722	24	–	11	.686
No. 22 Northwestern	12	–	6	.667	23	–	9	.719
Rutgers	12	–	6	.667	23	–	10	.697
Minnesota	11	–	7	.611	23	–	10	.697
Nebraska	10	–	8	.556	21	–	11	.656
Michigan	8	–	10	.444	20	–	15	.571
Michigan State	7	–	11	.389	16	–	15	.516
Illinois	6	–	12	.333	15	–	16	.484
Wisconsin	5	–	13	.278	9	–	20	.310
Indiana	4	–	14	.222	15	–	16	.484
Purdue	3	–	15	.167	11	–	20	.355
Penn State	3	–	15	.167	6	–	24	.200
† 2015 Big Ten tournament winner As of April 5, 2015; Rankings from AP poll

The 2014–15 Michigan Wolverines women's basketball team represented University of Michigan during the 2014–15 NCAA Division I women's basketball season. The Wolverines, led by third year head coach Kim Barnes Arico, played their home games at the Crisler Center and were members of the Big Ten Conference. They finished the season 20–15, 8–10 in Big Ten play to finish in eighth place. They lost in the second round in the Big Ten women's basketball tournament to their in-state rival Michigan State. They were invited to the Women's National Invitation Tournament, where they defeated Cleveland State, Toledo and Missouri in the first, second and third rounds, Southern Miss in the quarterfinals before losing to UCLA in the semifinals.

== Roster ==
2014–15 Michigan Wolverines women's basketball team
Players
Coaches

Pos.	#	Name	Height	Year	Previous school	Hometown
G	1	Madison Ristovski	5 ft 10 in (1.78 m)	Jr	University Liggett	Sterling Heights, Mich.
G	2	Siera Thompson	5 ft 7 in (1.7 m)	So	Serra	Gardena, Calif.
G	3	Katelynn Flaherty	5 ft 7 in (1.7 m)	Fr	Metuchen	Point Pleasant, N.J.
G	4	Hallie Wangler	5 ft 9 in (1.75 m)	RS Jr	Shrine Catholic	Royal Oak, Mich.
G	5	Shannon Smith	5 ft 7 in (1.7 m)	Sr	Forestview	Gastonia, N.C.
G	11	Jillian Dunston	5 ft 11 in (1.8 m)	Fr	Academy of the Holy Cross	Germantown, Md.
C	12	Terra Stapleton	6 ft 4 in (1.93 m)	Fr	Fairland	Proctorville, Ohio
G	14	Nicole Elmblad	5 ft 11 in (1.8 m)	Sr	LaSalle	St. Ignace, Mich.
G	15	Paige Rakers	5 ft 11 in (1.8 m)	So	Carlyle	Carlyle, Ill.
G	20	Danielle Williams	5 ft 9 in (1.75 m)	So	St. Mary's	Phoenix, Ariz.
F	22	Cyesha Goree	6 ft 3 in (1.91 m)	Sr	Wyoming Park	Grand Rapids, Mich.
G/F	23	Maria Backman	6 ft 1 in (1.85 m)	Fr	Cardinal Spellman	Bronx, N.Y.
F	24	Emoni Jackson	6 ft 1 in (1.85 m)	Fr	Long Beach Polytechnic	Pasadena, Calif.
F	32	Kelsey Mitchell	6 ft 0 in (1.83 m)	Jr	Inkster	Detroit, Mich.

Head coach

Kim Barnes Arico

Assistant coach(es)

Melanie Moore
Megan Duffy
Joy McCorvey

Legend

- (C) Team captain
- (S) Suspended
- (I) Ineligible
- (W) Walk-on
- Injured
- Current redshirt

Roster
Last update: 2014-07-28

== Schedule ==
Date time, TV	Rank^{#}	Opponent^{#}	Result	Record	Site (attendance) city, state
Exhibition
11/02/2014*; 2:00 pm		Davenport	W 74–39	–	Crisler Center (786); Ann Arbor, MI
Non-conference regular season
11/14/2014*; 7:00 pm		Detroit	W 76–57	1–0	Crisler Center (2,062); Ann Arbor, MI
11/16/2014*; 2:00 pm		Bucknell	W 68–61	2–0	Crisler Center (1,913); Ann Arbor, MI
11/20/2014*; 7:00 pm		at Pittsburgh	L 64–85	2–1	Peterson Events Center (707); Pittsburgh, PA
11/23/2014*; 2:00 pm		Western Michigan	W 74–47	3–1	Crisler Center (2,110); Ann Arbor, MI
11/28/2014*; 12:00 pm		vs. Washington State; San Juan Shootout	W 76–64	4–1	Mario Morales Coliseum (N/A); Guaynabo, PR
11/29/2014*; 12:00 pm		vs. San Diego State; San Juan Shootout	W 70–50	5–1	Mario Morales Coliseum (N/A); Guaynabo, PR
12/03/2014*; 7:00 pm		Wake Forest; ACC–Big Ten Women's Challenge	W 83–69	6–1	Crisler Center (1,225); Ann Arbor, MI
12/09/2014*; 6:30 pm		Princeton	L 55–85	6–2	Crisler Center (1,193); Ann Arbor, MI
12/13/2014*; 1:00 pm		at No. 5 Notre Dame	L 50–70	6–3	Edmund P. Joyce Center (8,904); South Bend, IN
12/19/2014*; 7:00 pm		Canisius	W 79–43	7–3	Crisler Center (1,985); Ann Arbor, MI
12/22/2014*; 12:00 pm		Eastern Michigan	W 81–52	8–3	Crisler Center (3,946); Ann Arbor, MI
Big Ten regular season
12/28/2014; 4:00 pm, BTN		at Wisconsin	L 53–63	8–4 (0–1)	Kohl Center (3,528); Madison, WI
01/01/2015; 1:00 pm		Penn State	W 89–53	9–4 (1–1)	Crisler Center (3,034); Ann Arbor, MI
01/04/2015; 2:00 pm, BTN		No. 24 Michigan State; Rivalry	W 74–65	10–4 (2–1)	Crisler Center (4,520); Ann Arbor, MI
01/07/2015; 7:00 pm		at No. 24 Rutgers	L 68–81	10–5 (2–2)	Louis Brown Athletic Center (2,554); Piscataway, NJ
01/11/2015; 2:00 pm		Ohio State; Rivalry	W 100–94 ^{OT}	11–5 (3–2)	Crisler Center (3,351); Ann Arbor, MI
01/17/2015; 6:00 pm, BTN		at Northwestern	W 73–66	12–5 (4–2)	Welsh-Ryan Arena (2,112); Evanston, IL
01/22/2015; 9:00 pm, BTN		at No. 20 Iowa	L 70–76	12–6 (4–3)	Carver–Hawkeye Arena (3,584); Iowa City, IA
01/26/2015; 7:00 pm, BTN		Illinois	W 70–57	13–6 (5–3)	Crisler Center (1,780); Ann Arbor, MI
01/29/2015; 7:00 pm		No. 5 Maryland	L 65–91	13–7 (5–4)	Crisler Center (1,358); Ann Arbor, MI
02/01/2015; 3:00 pm		at No. 15 Nebraska	L 60–75	13–8 (5–5)	Pinnacle Bank Arena (5,386); Lincoln, NE
02/05/2015; 7:00 pm		at Michigan State	W 72–59	14–8 (6–5)	Breslin Center (5,315); East Lansing, MI
02/08/2015; 2:00 pm		No. 21 Rutgers	L 50–57	14–9 (6–6)	Crisler Center (3,478); Ann Arbor, MI
02/10/2015; 7:00 pm		at Ohio State; Rivalry	L 73–77	14–10 (6–7)	Value City Arena (4,668); Columbus, OH
02/14/2015; 2:00 pm		Northwestern	L 62–63	14–11 (6–8)	Crisler Center (2,129); Ann Arbor, MI
02/18/2015; 7:00 pm		Indiana	W 68–52	15–11 (7–8)	Crisler Center (1,806); Ann Arbor, MI
02/21/2015; 2:00 pm, BTN		at Minnesota	L 88–91 ^{2OT}	15–12 (7–9)	Williams Arena (6,053); Minneapolis, MN
02/24/2015; 7:00 pm, BTN		Purdue	W 81–50	16–12 (8–9)	Crisler Center (1,534); Ann Arbor, MI
02/28/2015; 12:00 pm, BTN		at Illinois	L 60–72	16–13 (8–10)	State Farm Center (2,989); Champaign, IL
Big Ten Women's Tournament
03/05/2015; 12:30 pm, BTN		vs. Michigan State; Second Round	L 49–69	16–14	Sears Centre (N/A); Hoffman Estates, IN
WNIT
03/18/2015*; 7:00 pm		Cleveland State; First Round	W 72–50	17–14	Crisler Center (1,028); Ann Arbor, MI
03/23/2015*; 7:00 pm		at Toledo; Second Round	W 74–58	18–14	Savage Arena (3,004); Toledo, OH
03/26/2015*; 7:00 pm		Missouri; Third Round	W 65–55	19–14	Crisler Center (1,383); Ann Arbor, MI
03/29/2015*; 3:00 pm		at Southern Miss; Quarterfinals	W 69–60	20–14	Reed Green Coliseum (5,480); Hattiesburg, MS
04/01/2015*; 7:00 pm		UCLA; Semifinals	L 65–69	20–15	Crisler Center (2,209); Ann Arbor, MI
*Non-conference game. ^{#}Rankings from AP Poll. (#) Tournament seedings in parentheses. All times are in Eastern Time.

== See also ==
2014–15 Michigan Wolverines men's basketball team

== Rankings ==
Ranking movement Legend: ██ Increase in ranking. ██ Decrease in ranking. NR = Not ranked. RV = Received votes.
Poll	Pre	Wk 2	Wk 3	Wk 4	Wk 5	Wk 6	Wk 7	Wk 8	Wk 9	Wk 10	Wk 11	Wk 12	Wk 13	Wk 14	Wk 15	Wk 16	Wk 17	Wk 18	Final
AP	NR	NR	NR	NR	NR	NR	NR	NR	NR	NR	NR	NR	NR	NR	NR	NR	NR	NR	NR
Coaches	NR	NR	NR	NR	RV	NR	NR	NR	NR	NR	NR	NR	NR	NR	NR	NR	NR	NR	NR
