= 2014–15 Nebraska Cornhuskers women's basketball team =

Intercollegiate basketball season

2014–15 Nebraska Cornhuskers women's basketball

NCAA Women's Tournament, first round
- Conference: Big Ten Conference
- Record: 21–11 (10–8 Big Ten)
- Head coach: Connie Yori (13th season)
- Assistant coaches: Sunny Smallwood; Shimmy Gray-Miller; Dayna Finch
- Home arena: Pinnacle Bank Arena

2014–15 Big Ten women's basketball standings
	Conf.				Overall
Team	W		L	PCT	W		L	PCT
No. 4 Maryland†	18	–	0	1.000	34	–	3	.919
No. 18 Iowa	14	–	4	.778	26	–	8	.765
No. 23 Ohio State	13	–	5	.722	24	–	11	.686
No. 22 Northwestern	12	–	6	.667	23	–	9	.719
Rutgers	12	–	6	.667	23	–	10	.697
Minnesota	11	–	7	.611	23	–	10	.697
Nebraska	10	–	8	.556	21	–	11	.656
Michigan	8	–	10	.444	20	–	15	.571
Michigan State	7	–	11	.389	16	–	15	.516
Illinois	6	–	12	.333	15	–	16	.484
Wisconsin	5	–	13	.278	9	–	20	.310
Indiana	4	–	14	.222	15	–	16	.484
Purdue	3	–	15	.167	11	–	20	.355
Penn State	3	–	15	.167	6	–	24	.200
† 2015 Big Ten tournament winner As of April 5, 2015; Rankings from AP poll

The 2014–15 Nebraska Cornhuskers women's basketball team represented University of Nebraska–Lincoln during the 2014–15 NCAA Division I women's basketball season. The Cornhuskers, led by 13th-year head coach Connie Yori, played their home games at the newly Pinnacle Bank Arena and were members of the Big Ten Conference. They finished the season 21–11, 10–8 in Big Ten play to finish in seventh place. They advanced to the quarterfinals of the Big Ten women's tournament, where they lost to Iowa. They received an at-large bid to the NCAA women's tournament, where they lost to Syracuse in the first round.

== Previous season ==
The Nebraska Cornhuskers finished the 2013-14 season with an overall record of 26–7, with a record of 12–4 in the Big Ten regular season for a 3rd-place finish. In the 2014 Big Ten tournament, the Cornhuskers won their first Big Ten Women's Basketball Tournament in school history. They were invited to the 2014 NCAA Division I women's basketball tournament, making their 12th appearance. They lost in the second round to BYU.

== Offseason ==
=== Departures ===
Name	Number	Pos.	Height	Year	Hometown	Reason for departure
Jordan Hooper	35	F	6'2"	Senior	Alliance, NE	Graduated/2014 WNBA draft

=== 2014 recruiting class ===
College recruiting
Name	Hometown	School	Height	Weight	Commit date
Kaylee Page; W	Wamego, Kansas	Wamego High School	6 ft 2 in (1.88 m)	N/A	
Kaylee Page; W	Recruit ratings: (96)				
Natalie Romeo; PG	Martinez, California	Carondelet High School	5 ft 7 in (1.70 m)	N/A	
Natalie Romeo; PG	Recruit ratings: (95)				
Chandler Smith; W	Okanogan, Washington	Brewster High School	6 ft 1 in (1.85 m)	N/A	
Chandler Smith; W	Recruit ratings: (95)				
Jasmine Cincore; PG	Arlington, Tennessee	Briarcrest Christian School	5 ft 8 in (1.73 m)	N/A	
Jasmine Cincore; PG	Recruit ratings: (90)				
Darrien Washington; P	Oakland, California	Skyline High School	6 ft 2 in (1.88 m)	N/A	
Darrien Washington; P	Recruit ratings: (90)				
Overall recruit ranking:
Note: In many cases, Scout, Rivals, 247Sports, On3, and ESPN may conflict in their listings of height and weight.; In these cases, the average was taken. ESPN grades are on a 100-point scale.; Sources:

== Roster ==
2014–15 Nebraska Cornhuskers women's basketball team
Players
Coaches

Pos.	#	Name	Height	Year	Previous school	Hometown
G	1	Tear'a Laudermill	5 ft 9 in (1.75 m)	Sr	Canyon Springs	Riverside, CA
F	3	Hailie Sample	6 ft 1 in (1.85 m)	Sr	Marcus	Flower Mound, TX
G	5	Natalie Romeo	5 ft 7 in (1.7 m)	Fr	Carondelet	Martinez, CA
G	11	Esther Ramacieri	5 ft 8 in (1.73 m)	So	Dawson College/Felix Leclerc	Repentigny, QE, Canada
G	12	Emily Wood	5 ft 5 in (1.65 m)	Fr	Salina Central	Salina, KS
G	13	Brandi Jeffery	5 ft 7 in (1.7 m)	Sr	St. James	Vacherie, LA
F	22	Allie Havers	6 ft 5 in (1.96 m)	So	Mattawan	Paw Paw, MI
F	23	Emily Cady	6 ft 2 in (1.88 m)	Sr	Seward	Seward, NE
G/F	30	Chandler Smith	6 ft 1 in (1.85 m)	Fr	Brewster	Okanogan, WA
F	31	Anya Kalenta	6 ft 3 in (1.91 m)	Jr	Vincennes/Broward College; General Secondary #21	Minsk, Belarus
G	33	Rachel Theriot	6 ft 0 in (1.83 m)	Jr	Midpark	Middleburg Heights, OH
G	34	Jasmine Cincore	5 ft 8 in (1.73 m)	Fr	Briarcrest Christian School	Arlington, TN
C	50	Darrien Washington	6 ft 2 in (1.88 m)	Fr	Skyline	Oakland, CA

Head coach

Connie Yori

Assistant coach(es)

Sunny Smallwood
Shimmy Gray-Miller
Dayna Finch

Legend

- (C) Team captain
- (S) Suspended
- (I) Ineligible
- (W) Walk-on
- Injured
- Current redshirt

Roster
Last update: 2014-09-14

== Schedule ==
Date time, TV	Rank^{#}	Opponent^{#}	Result	Record	Site (attendance) city, state
Exhibition
11/02/2014*; 2:00 pm	No. 16	Wayne State	W 84–43	–	Pinnacle Bank Arena (4,948); Lincoln, NE
11/09/2014*; 2:00 pm	No. 16	Concordia	W 78–46	–	Pinnacle Bank Arena (4,467); Lincoln, NE
Non-conference regular season
11/15/2014*; 11:00 am	No. 16	Pepperdine	W 100–65	1–0	Pinnacle Bank Arena (4,520); Lincoln, NE
11/16/2014*; 5:00 pm	No. 16	Alcorn State	W 83–49	2–0	Pinnacle Bank Arena (4,770); Lincoln, NE
11/19/2014*; 10:00 pm, P12N	No. 16	at Washington State	W 82–61	3–0	Beasley Coliseum (853); Pullman, WA
11/23/2014*; 1:00 pm	No. 16	Utah	W 66–43	4–0	Pinnacle Bank Arena (3,321); Lincoln, NE
11/28/2014*; 3:00 pm, P12N	No. 15	at UCLA	W 71–66	5–0	Pauley Pavilion (1,169); Los Angeles, CA
11/30/2014*; 2:00 pm	No. 15	Northern Colorado	W 63–56	6–0	Pinnacle Bank Arena (4,975); Lincoln, NE
12/03/2014*; 6:30 pm, BTN	No. 12	No. 9 Duke; ACC–Big Ten Women's Challenge	W 60–54	7–0	Pinnacle Bank Arena (7,571); Lincoln, NE
12/07/2014*; 2:00 pm	No. 12	at Alabama	L 51–53	7–1	Foster Auditorium (2,562); Tuscaloosa, AL
12/11/2014*; 8:05 pm, FS1	No. 12	at Creighton	W 60–57	8–1	D. J. Sokol Arena (1,411); Omaha, NE
12/13/2013*; 2:00 pm	No. 12	Cal State Bakersfield	W 54–45	9–1	Pinnacle Bank Arena (4,957); Lincoln, NE
12/20/2014*; 3:00 pm	No. 12	High Point	W 83–57	10–1	Pinnacle Bank Arena (5,244); Lincoln, NE
Big Ten regular season
12/29/2014; 8:00 pm, BTN	No. 12	at Minnesota	L 69–72	10–2 (0–1)	Williams Arena (3,300); Minneapolis, MN
01/03/2015; 3:00 pm, CBS	No. 12	No. 14 Maryland	L 47–75	10–3 (0–2)	Pinnacle Bank Arena (7,505); Lincoln, NE
01/08/2015; 7:30 pm, BTN	No. 19	at Michigan State	W 71–67	11–3 (1–2)	Breslin Center (4,652); East Lansing, MI
01/11/2015; 2:00 pm	No. 19	at Illinois	W 58–53	12–3 (2–2)	State Farm Center (3,263); Champaign, IL
01/15/2015; 6:00 pm, BTN	No. 17	Penn State	W 73–45	13–3 (3–2)	Pinnacle Bank Arena (5,395); Lincoln, NE
01/19/2015; 6:00 pm, BTN	No. 16	Purdue	W 69–59	14–3 (4–2)	Pinnacle Bank Arena (5,095); Lincoln, NE
01/22/2015; 7:00 pm	No. 16	at Wisconsin	W 89–72	15–3 (5–2)	Kohl Center (3,023); Madison, WI
01/26/2015; 8:00 pm, BTN	No. 15	at No. 20 Iowa	L 72–78 ^{OT}	15–4 (5–3)	Carver–Hawkeye Arena (4,489); Iowa City, IA
01/29/2015; 7:00 pm	No. 15	Illinois	W 59–57	16–4 (6–3)	Pinnacle Bank Arena (7,378); Lincoln, NE
02/01/2015; 2:00 pm	No. 15	Michigan	W 75–60	17–4 (7–3)	Pinnacle Bank Arena (5,386); Lincoln, NE
02/05/2015; 6:00 pm, BTN	No. 19	at No. 21 Rutgers	L 43–46	17–5 (7–4)	Louis Brown Athletic Center (2,436); Piscataway, NJ
02/08/2015; 3:00 pm, ESPN2	No. 19	at No. 5 Maryland	L 47–59	17–6 (7–5)	Xfinity Center (10,937); College Park, MD
02/12/2015; 8:00 pm, BTN	No. 22	No. 14 Iowa	L 61–69	17–7 (7–6)	Pinnacle Bank Arena (5,260); Lincoln, NE
02/15/2015; 2:00 pm	No. 22	Wisconsin	W 70–63	18–7 (8–6)	Pinnacle Bank Arena (8,622); Lincoln, NE
02/18/2015; 7:00 pm	No. 21	at Northwestern	L 51–59	18–8 (8–7)	Welsh-Ryan Arena (779); Evanston, IL
02/21/2015; 11:00 am, BTN	No. 21	at Indiana	W 67–64	19–8 (9–7)	Assembly Hall (2,490); Bloomington, IN
02/24/2015; 8:00 pm, BTN		Minnesota	W 74–50	20–8 (10–7)	Pinnacle Bank Arena (5,290); Lincoln, NE
03/01/2015; 4:00 pm, BTN		Ohio State	L 60–78	20–9 (10–8)	Pinnacle Bank Arena (8,418); Lincoln, NE
Big Ten women's tournament
03/05/2015; 6:00 pm, BTN		vs. Illinois; Second Round	W 86–71	21–9	Sears Centre (N/A); Hoffman Estates, IL
03/05/2015; 6:00 pm, BTN		vs. No. 14 Iowa; Quarterfinals	L 65–74	21–10	Sears Centre (N/A); Hoffman Estates, IL
NCAA women's tournament
03/20/2015*; 6:36 pm, ESPN2		vs. Syracuse; First Round	L 69–72	21–11	Colonial Life Arena (10,644); Columbia, SC
*Non-conference game. ^{#}Rankings from AP Poll. (#) Tournament seedings in parentheses. All times are in Central Time.

== Rankings ==
Ranking movement Legend: ██ Increase in ranking. ██ Decrease in ranking. NR = Not ranked. RV = Received votes.
Poll	Pre	Wk 2	Wk 3	Wk 4	Wk 5	Wk 6	Wk 7	Wk 8	Wk 9	Wk 10	Wk 11	Wk 12	Wk 13	Wk 14	Wk 15	Wk 16	Wk 17	Wk 18	Final
AP	16	16	15	12	12	12	12	12	19	17	16	15	19	22	21	RV	RV	NR	NR
Coaches	16	15	15	15	15	15	12	16	18	15	15	19	18	20	20	23	25	NR	NR

== See also ==
- 2014–15 Nebraska Cornhuskers men's basketball team
