= 2014–15 Purdue Boilermakers women's basketball team =

Intercollegiate basketball season

2014–15 Purdue Boilermakers women's basketball
- Conference: Big Ten Conference
- Record: 11–20 (3–15 Big Ten)
- Head coach: Sharon Versyp
- Assistant coaches: Nadine Morgan; Kelly Komara; Lindsay Wisdom-Hylton
- Home arena: Mackey Arena

2014–15 Big Ten women's basketball standings
| | Conf. | | | | Overall |
| Team | W | | L | PCT | W | | L | PCT |
|---|---|---|---|---|---|---|---|---|
| No. 4 Maryland† | 18 | – | 0 | 1.000 | 34 | – | 3 | .919 |
| No. 18 Iowa | 14 | – | 4 | .778 | 26 | – | 8 | .765 |
| No. 23 Ohio State | 13 | – | 5 | .722 | 24 | – | 11 | .686 |
| No. 22 Northwestern | 12 | – | 6 | .667 | 23 | – | 9 | .719 |
| Rutgers | 12 | – | 6 | .667 | 23 | – | 10 | .697 |
| Minnesota | 11 | – | 7 | .611 | 23 | – | 10 | .697 |
| Nebraska | 10 | – | 8 | .556 | 21 | – | 11 | .656 |
| Michigan | 8 | – | 10 | .444 | 20 | – | 15 | .571 |
| Michigan State | 7 | – | 11 | .389 | 16 | – | 15 | .516 |
| Illinois | 6 | – | 12 | .333 | 15 | – | 16 | .484 |
| Wisconsin | 5 | – | 13 | .278 | 9 | – | 20 | .310 |
| Indiana | 4 | – | 14 | .222 | 15 | – | 16 | .484 |
| Purdue | 3 | – | 15 | .167 | 11 | – | 20 | .355 |
| Penn State | 3 | – | 15 | .167 | 6 | – | 24 | .200 |
† 2015 Big Ten tournament winner As of April 5, 2015; Rankings from AP poll

The 2014–15 Purdue Boilermakers women's basketball team represented Purdue University during the 2014–15 NCAA Division I women's basketball season. The Boilermakers, led by ninth year head coach Sharon Versyp, played their home games at the Mackey Arena and were members of the Big Ten Conference. They finished the season 11–20, 3–15 to finish in tie for thirteenth place. They advanced to the second round of the Big Ten women's tournament, where they lost to Minnesota.

== Roster ==
2014–15 Purdue Boilermakers women's basketball team
Players
Coaches

| Pos. | # | Name | Height | Year | Previous school | Hometown |
|---|---|---|---|---|---|---|
| F | 32 | Whitney Bays | 6 ft 2 in (1.88 m) | RS Sr | Huntington | Huntington, W.Va. |
| F | 43 | Haley Bodnar | 6 ft 3 in (1.91 m) | Fr | Desert Hills | Saint George, Utah |
| F | 23 | Liza Clemons | 6 ft 2 in (1.88 m) | Sr | Snider/Elmhurst | Fort Wayne, Ind. |
| G | 5 | Justine Hall | 5 ft 10 in (1.78 m) | Fr | Regis Jesuit | Denver, Colo. |
| G | 10 | Hayden Hamby | 5 ft 7 in (1.7 m) | Jr | West Morgan | Trinity, Ala. |
| C | 22 | Bree Horrocks | 6 ft 5 in (1.96 m) | Fr | Buford | Buford, Ga. |
| G | 24 | Andreona Keys | 5 ft 10 in (1.78 m) | Fr | Roswell | Atlanta, Ga. |
| F | 21 | Erica Moore | 6 ft 2 in (1.88 m) | Fr | Mount Vernon | Fortville, Ind. |
| G | 1 | Ashley Morrissette | 5 ft 9 in (1.75 m) | So | Twinsburg | Twinsburg, Ohio |
| G | 13 | Bridget Perry | 6 ft 2 in (1.88 m) | So | Roncalli | Mooresville, Ind. |
| G | 4 | Torrie Thornton | 6 ft 0 in (1.83 m) | RS Jr | Carmel | Carmel, Ind. |
| G | 25 | April Wilson | 5 ft 7 in (1.7 m) | Jr | Manual | Louisville, Ky. |

Head coach

Sharon Versyp

Assistant coach(es)

Nadine Morgan
Kelly Komara
Lindsay Wisdom-Hylton

Legend

- (C) Team captain
- (S) Suspended
- (I) Ineligible
- (W) Walk-on
- Injured
- Current redshirt

Roster
Last update: 2013-07-28

== Schedule ==
| Date time, TV | Rank^{#} | Opponent^{#} | Result | Record | Site (attendance) city, state |
Exhibition
| 11/09/2014*; 2:00 pm | | Findlay | W 84–25 | – | Mackey Arena (5,948); West Lafayette, IN |
Non-conference regular season
| 11/14/2014*; 7:00 pm | | at Ball State | W 66–60 | 1–0 | Worthen Arena (4,012); Muncie, IN |
| 11/19/2014*; 5:30 pm | No. 24 | Green Bay | L 78–81 ^{2OT} | 1–1 | Mackey Arena (5,730); West Lafayette, IN |
| 11/23/2014*; 2:00 pm | No. 24 | Toledo | W 66–48 | 2–1 | Mackey Arena (5,969); West Lafayette, IN |
| 11/28/2014*; 3:15 pm | | vs. Texas Tech; Junkanoo Jam Quarterfinals | W 69–53 | 3–1 | St. George HS Gymnasium (225); Freeport, BAH |
| 11/29/2014*; 3:15 pm | | vs. George Washington; Junkanoo Jam championship | L 59–79 | 3–2 | St. George HS Gymnasium (429); Freeport, BAH |
| 12/03/2014*; 7:00 pm | | Florida State; ACC–Big Ten Women's Challenge | L 64–67 ^{OT} | 3–3 | Mackey Arena (5,725); West Lafayette, IN |
| 12/07/2014*; 2:00 pm | | at Dayton | L 61–63 | 3–4 | University of Dayton Arena (2,106); Dayton, OH |
| 12/11/2014*; 7:00 pm | | Kansas | W 61–48 | 4–4 | Mackey Arena (5,760); West Lafayette, IN |
| 12/19/2014*; 12:00 pm | | UC Irvine; World Vision Classic | W 69–44 | 5–4 | Mackey Arena (7,283); West Lafayette, IN |
| 12/20/2014*; 2:30 pm | | Denver; World Vision Classic | W 65–51 | 6–4 | Mackey Arena (6,009); West Lafayette, IN |
| 12/21/2014*; 2:30 pm | | Wright State; World Vision Classic | W 70–46 | 7–4 | Mackey Arena (5,966); West Lafayette, IN |
Big Ten regular season
| 12/28/2014; 3:00 pm | | at Illinois | W 62–55 | 8–4 (1–0) | State Farm Center (2,548); Champaign, IL |
| 01/01/2015; 2:00 pm | | Minnesota | L 68–81 | 8–5 (1–1) | Mackey Arena (6,361); West Lafayette, IN |
| 01/04/2015; 2:00 pm | | Indiana; Rivalry/Crimson and Gold Cup | W 86–64 | 9–5 (2–1) | Mackey Arena (6,990); West Lafayette, IN |
| 01/08/2015; 2:00 pm, BTN | | at No. 12 Maryland | L 64–88 | 9–6 (2–2) | Xfinity Center (4,277); College Park, MD |
| 01/11/2015; 2:00 pm, BTN | | at No. 17 Iowa | L 59–73 | 9–7 (2–3) | Carver–Hawkeye Arena (7,359); Iowa City, IA |
| 01/15/2015; 7:00 pm | | Wisconsin | L 56–65 | 9–8 (2–4) | Mackey Arena (5,916); West Lafayette, IN |
| 01/19/2015; 7:00 pm, BTN | | at No. 16 Nebraska | L 59–69 | 9–9 (2–5) | Pinnacle Bank Arena (5,095); Lincoln, NE |
| 01/22/2015; 8:00 pm | | at No. 21 Minnesota | W 90–88 ^{OT} | 10–9 (3–5) | Williams Arena (3,714); Minneapolis, MN |
| 01/25/2015; 2:00 pm | | Ohio State | L 71–79 ^{OT} | 10–10 (3–6) | Mackey Arena (6,801); West Lafayette, IN |
| 01/29/2015; 7:00 pm, BTN | | No. 22 Rutgers | L 49–58 | 10–11 (3–7) | Mackey Arena (5,780); West Lafayette, IN |
| 02/02/2015; 8:30 pm, BTN | | at Indiana; Rivalry/Crimson and Gold Cup | L 55–72 | 10–12 (3–8) | Assembly Hall (2,468); Bloomington, IN |
| 02/08/2015; 2:00 pm | | Penn State | L 50–54 | 10–13 (3–9) | Mackey Arena (6,861); West Lafayette, IN |
| 02/11/2015; 7:00 pm | | Northwestern | L 65–73 ^{OT} | 10–14 (3–10) | Mackey Arena (5,929); West Lafayette, IN |
| 02/14/2015; 12:00 pm, BTN | | at No. 18 Rutgers | L 49–78 | 10–15 (3–11) | Louis Brown Athletic Center (2,713); Piscataway, NJ |
| 02/17/2015; 7:00 pm, BTN | | at Ohio State | L 60–92 | 10–16 (3–12) | Value City Arena (4,185); Columbus, OH |
| 02/21/2015; 2:00 pm | | Illinois | L 46–47 | 10–17 (3–13) | Mackey Arena (6,348); West Lafayette, IN |
| 02/24/2015; 7:00 pm, BTN | | at Michigan | L 50–81 | 10–18 (3–14) | Crisler Arena (1,534); Ann Arbor, MI |
| 02/28/2015; 2:00 pm, BTN | | Michigan State | L 56–61 | 10–19 (3–15) | Mackey Arena (7,030); West Lafayette, IN |
Big Ten Women's Tournament
| 03/04/2015; 8:30 pm | | vs. Wisconsin; First Round | W 58–56 | 11–19 | Sears Centre (3,471); Hoffman Estates, IL |
| 03/05/2015; 9:30 pm, BTN | | vs. Minnesota; Second Round | L 78–82 | 11–20 | Sears Centre (3,681); Hoffman Estates, IL |
*Non-conference game. ^{#}Rankings from AP Poll. (#) Tournament seedings in parentheses. All times are in Eastern Time.

== Rankings ==
Ranking movement Legend: ██ Increase in ranking. ██ Decrease in ranking. NR = Not ranked. RV = Received votes.
| Poll | Pre | Wk 2 | Wk 3 | Wk 4 | Wk 5 | Wk 6 | Wk 7 | Wk 8 | Wk 9 | Wk 10 | Wk 11 | Wk 12 | Wk 13 | Wk 14 | Wk 15 | Wk 16 | Wk 17 | Wk 18 | Final |
|---|---|---|---|---|---|---|---|---|---|---|---|---|---|---|---|---|---|---|---|
| AP | RV | 24т | RV | NR | NR | NR | NR | NR | NR | NR | NR | NR | NR | NR | NR | NR | NR | NR | NR |
| Coaches | RV | RV | RV | NR | NR | NR | NR | NR | NR | NR | NR | NR | NR | NR | NR | NR | NR | NR | NR |

== See also ==
2014–15 Purdue Boilermakers men's basketball team
