= 2014–15 Wisconsin Badgers women's basketball team =

Intercollegiate basketball season

2014–15 Wisconsin Badgers women's basketball
- Conference: Big Ten Conference
- Record: 9–20 (5–13 Big Ten)
- Head coach: Bobbie Kelsey
- Assistant coaches: Jayme Callahan Stewart; Stacy Cantley; Alysiah Bond
- Home arena: Kohl Center

2014–15 Big Ten women's basketball standings
| | Conf. | | | | Overall |
| Team | W | | L | PCT | W | | L | PCT |
|---|---|---|---|---|---|---|---|---|
| No. 4 Maryland† | 18 | – | 0 | 1.000 | 34 | – | 3 | .919 |
| No. 18 Iowa | 14 | – | 4 | .778 | 26 | – | 8 | .765 |
| No. 23 Ohio State | 13 | – | 5 | .722 | 24 | – | 11 | .686 |
| No. 22 Northwestern | 12 | – | 6 | .667 | 23 | – | 9 | .719 |
| Rutgers | 12 | – | 6 | .667 | 23 | – | 10 | .697 |
| Minnesota | 11 | – | 7 | .611 | 23 | – | 10 | .697 |
| Nebraska | 10 | – | 8 | .556 | 21 | – | 11 | .656 |
| Michigan | 8 | – | 10 | .444 | 20 | – | 15 | .571 |
| Michigan State | 7 | – | 11 | .389 | 16 | – | 15 | .516 |
| Illinois | 6 | – | 12 | .333 | 15 | – | 16 | .484 |
| Wisconsin | 5 | – | 13 | .278 | 9 | – | 20 | .310 |
| Indiana | 4 | – | 14 | .222 | 15 | – | 16 | .484 |
| Purdue | 3 | – | 15 | .167 | 11 | – | 20 | .355 |
| Penn State | 3 | – | 15 | .167 | 6 | – | 24 | .200 |
† 2015 Big Ten tournament winner As of April 5, 2015; Rankings from AP poll

The 2014–15 Wisconsin Badgers women's basketball team represented the University of Wisconsin–Madison during the 2014–15 NCAA Division I women's basketball season. The Badgers, led by fourth year head coach Bobbie Kelsey, play their home games at the Kohl Center and were members of the Big Ten Conference. They finished the season 9–20, 5–13 in Big Ten play to finish in eleventh place. They lost in the first round of the Big Ten women's tournament to Purdue.

== Roster ==
2014–15 Wisconsin Badgers women's basketball team
Players
Coaches

| Pos. | # | Name | Height | Year | Previous school | Hometown |
|---|---|---|---|---|---|---|
| F | 00 | Shannon Malone | 6 ft 1 in (1.85 m) | Jr | Marcus | Flower Mound, Texas |
| G | 1 | Dakota Whyte | 5 ft 8 in (1.73 m) | Jr | Notre Dame Catholic | Ajax, Ontario |
| G/F | 3 | AnnMarie Brown | 6 ft 0 in (1.83 m) | Sr | St. Peter | St. Peter, Minn. |
| G | 4 | Nicole Bauman | 5 ft 10 in (1.78 m) | Jr | Eisenhower | New Berlin, Wis. |
| G | 5 | Roichelle Marble | 5 ft 7 in (1.7 m) | Fr | East | Des Moines, Iowa |
| G | 22 | Tessa Cichy | 6 ft 0 in (1.83 m) | Jr | Hill-Murray (Maplewood, Minn.) | Somerset, Wis. |
| G | 23 | Cayla McMorris | 5 ft 10 in (1.78 m) | Fr | Park Center | Brooklyn, Minn. |
| F/C | 24 | Malayna Johnson | 6 ft 4 in (1.93 m) | So | Montini Catholic | Bellwood, Ill. |
| F/C | 25 | Michala Johnson | 6 ft 3 in (1.91 m) | RS Sr | Connecticut | Bellwood, Ill. |
| G | 30 | Carly Truesdale | 5 ft 9 in (1.75 m) | So | Westbury Christian | San Antonio, Texas |
| F | 32 | Michala Crall | 6 ft 3 in (1.91 m) | RS Fr | Olathe Northwest | Olathe, Kansas |
| F | 35 | Jacki Gulczynski | 6 ft 1 in (1.85 m) | Sr | Bartlett | Carol Stream, Ill. |
| F | 40 | Avyanna Young | 6 ft 1 in (1.85 m) | Jr | Milwaukee | Milwaukee, Wis. |
| C | 41 | Rosanna Gambino | 6 ft 4 in (1.93 m) | RS Jr | Kishwaukee College | Oswego, Ill. |
| F/C | 43 | Cassie Rochel | 6 ft 4 in (1.93 m) | RS Sr | Lakeville North | Lakeville, Minn. |

Head coach

Bobbie Kelsey

Assistant coach(es)

Jayme Callahan Stewart
Stacy Cantley
Alysiah Bond

Legend

- (C) Team captain
- (S) Suspended
- (I) Ineligible
- (W) Walk-on
- Injured
- Current redshirt

Roster
Last update: 2014-07-13

== Schedule ==
| Date time, TV | Rank^{#} | Opponent^{#} | Result | Record | Site (attendance) city, state |
Exhibition
| 11/09/2014*; 2:00 pm | | UW-River Falls | W 94–55 | – | Kohl Center (N/A); Madison, WI |
| 11/12/2014*; 7:00 pm | | Minnesota Duluth | W 80–60 | – | Kohl Center (2,943); Madison, WI |
Non-conference regular season
| 11/16/2014*; 4:00 pm | | Illinois State | W 71–60 | 1–0 | Kohl Center (3,239); Madison, WI |
| 11/20/2014*; 7:00 pm | | Vanderbilt | L 58–67 | 1–1 | Kohl Center (3,168); Madison, WI |
| 11/23/2014*; 2:00 pm | | at Drake | L 77–89 | 1–2 | Knapp Center (2,430); Des Moines, IA |
| 11/27/2014*; 3:15 pm | | vs. No. 1 South Carolina; Junkanoo Jam semifinals | L 44–67 | 1–3 | St. George HS Gymnasium (167); Freeport, BAH |
| 11/28/2014*; 4:45 pm | | vs. East Carolina; Junkanoo Jam consolation 3rd place game | L 43–61 | 1–4 | St. George HS Gymnasium (150); Freeport, BAH |
| 12/04/2014*; 6:00 pm | | at Miami (FL); ACC–Big Ten Women's Challenge | L 54–66 | 1–5 | BankUnited Center (593); Coral Gables, FL |
| 12/06/2014*; 1:00 pm | | Marquette | W 89–64 | 2–5 | Kohl Center (3,412); Madison, WI |
| 12/10/2014*; 6:00 pm, SECN | | at Florida | W 51–48 | 3–5 | O'Connell Center (1,679); Gainesville, FL |
| 12/13/2014*; 7:00 pm, ESPN3 | | at Green Bay | L 43–53 | 3–6 | Kress Events Center (3,581); Green Bay, WI |
| 12/20/2014*; 5:00 pm | | Oral Roberts | W 70–52 | 4–6 | Wisconsin Field House (3,476); Madison, WI |
Big Ten regular season
| 12/28/2014; 3:00 pm, BTN | | Michigan | W 63–53 | 5–6 (1–0) | Kohl Center (3,528); Madison, WI |
| 01/01/2015; 1:00 pm | | at Northwestern | L 46–68 | 5–7 (1–1) | Welsh-Ryan Arena (1,163); Evanston, IL |
| 01/04/2015; 2:00 pm | | Minnesota | L 60–72 | 5–8 (1–2) | Kohl Center (3,814); Madison, WI |
| 01/06/2015; 8:00 pm, BTN | | Penn State | W 65–46 | 6–8 (2–2) | Kohl Center (2,822); Madison, WI |
| 01/11/2015; 3:00 pm | | at Indiana | L 52–67 | 6–9 (2–3) | Assembly Hall (3,155); Bloomington, IN |
| 01/15/2015; 6:00 pm | | at Purdue | W 65–56 | 7–9 (3–3) | Mackey Arena (5,916); West Lafayette, IN |
| 01/18/2015; 2:00 pm | | No. 24 Rutgers | L 63–73 | 7–10 (3–4) | Kohl Center (4,114); Madison, WI |
| 01/22/2015; 7:00 pm | | No. 16 Nebraska | L 72–89 | 7–11 (3–5) | Kohl Center (3,023); Madison, WI |
| 01/25/2015; 1:00 pm | | at Michigan State | L 71–77 | 7–12 (3–6) | Breslin Center (7,560); East Lansing, MI |
| 01/29/2015; 8:00 pm, BTN | | Ohio State | L 73–85 | 7–13 (3–7) | Kohl Center (3,296); Madison, WI |
| 02/01/2015; 2:00 pm | | at Illinois | W 73–62 | 8–13 (4–7) | State Farm Center (1,797); Champaign, IL |
| 02/08/2015; 2:00 pm | | No. 16 Iowa | L 75–87 | 8–14 (4–8) | Kohl Center (11,428); Madison, WI |
| 02/11/2015; 7:00 pm | | at Minnesota | L 82–93 | 8–15 (4–9) | Williams Arena (3,609); Minnesota, MN |
| 02/15/2015; 2:00 pm | | at No. 22 Nebraska | L 63–70 | 8–16 (4–10) | Pinnacle Bank Arena (8,622); Lincoln, NE |
| 02/19/2015; 8:00 pm, BTN | | No. 5 Maryland | L 70–81 | 8–17 (4–11) | Kohl Center (3,026); Madison, WI |
| 02/22/2015; 3:00 pm | | Northwestern | L 83–86 ^{OT} | 8–18 (4–12) | Kohl Center (N/A); Madison, WI |
| 02/26/2015; 7:00 pm | | at No. 17 Iowa | L 74–78 | 8–19 (4–13) | Carver–Hawkeye Arena (4,536); Iowa City, IA |
| 03/01/2015; 1:00 pm | | at Penn State | W 62–56 | 9–19 (5–13) | Bryce Jordan Center (9,270); University Park, PA |
Big Ten Women's Tournament
| 03/04/2015; 7:30 pm | | vs. Purdue; First Round | L 56–58 | 9–20 | Sears Centre (3,471); Hoffman Estates, IL |
*Non-conference game. ^{#}Rankings from AP Poll. (#) Tournament seedings in parentheses. All times are in Central Time.

== See also ==
2014–15 Wisconsin Badgers men's basketball team
