= 2014–15 Northwestern Wildcats women's basketball team =

Intercollegiate basketball season

2014–15 Northwestern Wildcats women's basketball

NCAA tournament, First round
- Conference: Big Ten Conference

Ranking
- AP: No. 22
- Record: 23–9 (12–6 Big Ten)
- Head coach: Joe McKeown (7th season)
- Assistant coaches: Sam Dixon; Allison Guth; Carrie Banks
- Home arena: Welsh-Ryan Arena

2014–15 Big Ten women's basketball standings
	Conf.				Overall
Team	W		L	PCT	W		L	PCT
No. 4 Maryland†	18	–	0	1.000	34	–	3	.919
No. 18 Iowa	14	–	4	.778	26	–	8	.765
No. 23 Ohio State	13	–	5	.722	24	–	11	.686
No. 22 Northwestern	12	–	6	.667	23	–	9	.719
Rutgers	12	–	6	.667	23	–	10	.697
Minnesota	11	–	7	.611	23	–	10	.697
Nebraska	10	–	8	.556	21	–	11	.656
Michigan	8	–	10	.444	20	–	15	.571
Michigan State	7	–	11	.389	16	–	15	.516
Illinois	6	–	12	.333	15	–	16	.484
Wisconsin	5	–	13	.278	9	–	20	.310
Indiana	4	–	14	.222	15	–	16	.484
Purdue	3	–	15	.167	11	–	20	.355
Penn State	3	–	15	.167	6	–	24	.200
† 2015 Big Ten tournament winner As of April 5, 2015; Rankings from AP poll

The 2014–15 Northwestern Wildcats women's basketball team represented Northwestern University during the 2014–15 NCAA Division I women's basketball season. The Wildcats, led by seventh-year head coach Joe McKeown, played their home games at the Welsh-Ryan Arena and were members of the Big Ten Conference. They finished the season 23–9, 12–6 in Big Ten play to finish in a tie for fourth place. They advanced to the semifinals of the Big Ten women's tournament, where they lost to Maryland. They received an at-large bid to the NCAA women's basketball tournament, which was their first trip since 1997. They lost in the first round to Arkansas.

== 2014–15 roster ==
2014–15 Northwestern Wildcats women's basketball team
Players
Coaches

Pos.	#	Name	Height	Year	Previous school	Hometown
F	10	Nia Coffey	6 ft 1 in (1.85 m)	So	Hopkins	Minneapolis, Minn.
F/C	5	Alex Cohen	6 ft 5 in (1.96 m)	Sr	Nicolet	Bayside, Wis.
G	3	Ashley Deary	5 ft 4 in (1.63 m)	So	Flower Mound	Flower Mound, Texas
F	11	Lauren Douglas	6 ft 2 in (1.88 m)	Jr	Briarcrest Christian	Collierville, Tenn.
G	21	Alexis Glasgow	5 ft 11 in (1.8 m)	Fr	Rolling Meadows	Arlington Heights, Ill.
G	1	Morgan Green	5 ft 8 in (1.73 m)	Fr	Pacific Collegiate	Santa Cruz, Calif.
G	2	Tessa Haldes	5 ft 10 in (1.78 m)	Jr	Whitney Young	Chicago, Ill.
G	24	Christen Inman	5 ft 10 in (1.78 m)	So	Seven Lakes	Katy, Texas
F	32	Christen Johnson	6 ft 3 in (1.91 m)	Jr	The Lovett School	Powder Springs, Ga.
G	35	Maya Jonas	6 ft 2 in (1.88 m)	Fr	Whitefish Bay	Whitefish Bay, Wis.
G	13	Nof Kedem	5 ft 6 in (1.68 m)	Jr	Ostrovski High School	Olesh, Israel
G	25	Maggie Lyon	6 ft 1 in (1.85 m)	Jr	California	California
G	12	Lydia Rohde	5 ft 10 in (1.78 m)	Fr	Brookfield Central	Brookfield, Wis.
G	42	Karly Roser	5 ft 10 in (1.78 m)	Sr	Saint Mary's	Hamilton, Ontario, Canada
F/C	30	Allie Tuttle	6 ft 4 in (1.93 m)	So	Panther Creek	Cary, N.C.
			—

Head coach

Joe McKeown

Assistant coach(es)

Sam Dixon, Ph.D.
Allison Guth
Carrie Banks

Legend

- (C) Team captain
- (S) Suspended
- (I) Ineligible
- (W) Walk-on
- Injured
- Current redshirt

Roster
Last update: 2014-09-14

== Schedule ==
Date time, TV	Rank^{#}	Opponent^{#}	Result	Record	Site (attendance) city, state
Exhibition
11/09/2014*; 2:00 pm		UW–Parkside	W 78–47	–	Welsh-Ryan Arena (N/A); Evanston, IL
Non-conference regular season
11/14/2014*; 7:05 pm		at Chicago State	W 102–48	1–0	Jones Convocation Center (N/A); Chicago, IL
11/16/2014*; 2:00 pm		Hampton	W 62–36	2–0	Welsh-Ryan Arena (546); Evanston, IL
11/21/2014*; 7:00 pm		Kent State	W 72–54	3–0	Welsh-Ryan Arena (452); Evanston, IL
11/26/2014*; 12:00 pm		UIC	W 61–40	4–0	Welsh-Ryan Arena (414); Evanston, IL
11/29/2014*; 7:00 pm		at No. 18 DePaul	W 97–91 ^{2OT}	5–0	Sullivan Athletic Center (2,565); Chicago, IL
12/04/2014*; 6:00 pm		at Virginia Tech; ACC–Big Ten Women's Challenge	W 70–45	6–0	Cassell Coliseum (1,430); Blacksburg, VA
12/07/2014*; 2:00 pm		Loyola–Chicago	W 70–33	7–0	Welsh-Ryan Arena (612); Evanston, IL
12/15/2014*; 12:00 pm		Gonzaga	W 62–43	8–0	Welsh-Ryan Arena (5,047); Evanston, IL
12/17/2014*; 6:00 pm		at UNLV	W 88–84	9–0	Thomas & Mack Center (N/A); Paradise, NV
12/20/2014*; 4:30 pm		vs. Eastern Illinois; ASU Tournament semifinals	W 92–44	10–0	Wells Fargo Arena (1,189); Tempe, AZ
12/21/2014*; 3:00 pm		at Arizona State; ASU Tournament championship	L 75–88	10–1	Wells Fargo Arena (2,647); Tempe, AZ
Big Ten regular season
12/28/2014; 1:00 pm		at No. 20 Michigan State	W 61–57	11–1 (1–0)	Breslin Center (8,128); East Lansing, MI
01/01/2015; 1:00 pm		Wisconsin	W 68–46	12–1 (2–0)	Welsh-Ryan Arena (1,163); Evanston, IL
01/04/2015; 3:00 pm, BTN		at Ohio State	L 64–73	12–2 (2–1)	Value City Arena (5,402); Columbus, OH
01/11/2015; 2:00 pm		Michigan State	W 77–70	13–2 (3–1)	Welsh-Ryan Arena (1,152); Evanston, IL
01/14/2015; 7:00 pm		at No. 22 Iowa	L 70–83	13–3 (3–2)	Carver–Hawkeye Arena (4,027); Iowa City, IA
01/17/2015; 5:00 pm, BTN		Michigan	L 66–73	13–4 (3–3)	Welsh-Ryan Arena (2,112); Evanston, IL
01/22/2015; 7:00 pm		at Illinois	W 68–67	14–4 (4–3)	State Farm Center (1,725); Champaign, IL
01/25/2015; 1:00 pm		at Penn State	L 75–76	14–5 (4–4)	Bryce Jordan Center (3,786); University Park, PA
01/29/2015; 7:00 pm		No. 20 Iowa	L 99–102	14–6 (4–5)	Welsh-Ryan Arena (987); Evanston, IL
02/01/2015; 2:00 pm		Minnesota	W 70–49	15–6 (5–5)	Welsh-Ryan Arena (918); Evanston, IL
02/05/2015; 6:00 pm		at Indiana	W 75–69	16–6 (6–5)	Assembly Hall (2,094); Bloomington, IN
02/08/2015; 1:00 pm		Illinois	W 64–58	17–6 (7–5)	Welsh-Ryan Arena (2,011); Evanston, IL
02/11/2015; 6:00 pm		at Purdue	W 73–65 ^{OT}	18–6 (8–5)	Mackey Arena (5,929); West Lafayette, IN
02/14/2015; 1:00 pm, BTN		at Michigan	W 63–62	19–6 (9–5)	Crisler Center (2,129); Ann Arbor, MI
02/18/2015; 7:00 pm		No. 21 Nebraska	W 59–51	20–6 (10–5)	Welsh-Ryan Arena (779); Evanston, IL
02/22/2015; 3:00 pm		at Wisconsin	W 86–83 ^{OT}	21–6 (11–5)	Kohl Center (N/A); Madison, WI
02/26/2015; 7:00 pm	No. 25	No. 20 Rutgers	W 80–60	22–6 (12–5)	Welsh-Ryan Arena (903); Evanston, IL
03/01/2015; 12:00 pm, BTN	No. 25	No. 5 Maryland	L 48–69	22–7 (12–6)	Welsh-Ryan Arena (1,743); Evanston, IL
Big Ten Women's Tournament
03/06/2015; 2:00 pm, BTN	No. 24	vs. No. 23 Rutgers; Quarterfinals	W 62–57	23–7	Sears Centre (5,293); Hoffman Estates, IL
03/07/2015; 6:00 pm, BTN	No. 24	vs. No. 4 Maryland; Semifinals	L 57–62	23–8	Sears Centre (N/A); Hoffman Estates, IL
NCAA Women's Tournament
03/20/2015*; 11:00 am, ESPN2	No. 22	vs. Arkansas; First Round	L 55–57	23–9	Ferrell Center (N/A); Waco, TX
*Non-conference game. ^{#}Rankings from AP Poll. (#) Tournament seedings in parentheses. All times are in Central Time.

== Rankings ==
Ranking movement Legend: ██ Increase in ranking. ██ Decrease in ranking. NR = Not ranked. RV = Received votes.
Poll	Pre	Wk 2	Wk 3	Wk 4	Wk 5	Wk 6	Wk 7	Wk 8	Wk 9	Wk 10	Wk 11	Wk 12	Wk 13	Wk 14	Wk 15	Wk 16	Wk 17	Wk 18	Final
AP	RV	RV	NR	RV	RV	RV	RV	RV	RV	RV	NR	NR	NR	NR	RV	25	24	22	22
Coaches	NR	NR	NR	RV	RV	RV	RV	25	RV	RV	RV	RV	RV	RV	RV	RV	RV	25	RV

== See also ==
- 2014–15 Northwestern Wildcats men's basketball team
