= 2014–15 Indiana Hoosiers women's basketball team =

Intercollegiate basketball season

2014–15 Indiana Hoosiers women's basketball
- Conference: Big Ten Conference
- Record: 15–16 (4–14 Big Ten)
- Head coach: Teri Moren
- Assistant coaches: Curtis Loyd; Todd Starkey; Rhet Wierzba
- Home arena: Assembly Hall

2014–15 Big Ten women's basketball standings
	Conf.				Overall
Team	W		L	PCT	W		L	PCT
No. 4 Maryland†	18	–	0	1.000	34	–	3	.919
No. 18 Iowa	14	–	4	.778	26	–	8	.765
No. 23 Ohio State	13	–	5	.722	24	–	11	.686
No. 22 Northwestern	12	–	6	.667	23	–	9	.719
Rutgers	12	–	6	.667	23	–	10	.697
Minnesota	11	–	7	.611	23	–	10	.697
Nebraska	10	–	8	.556	21	–	11	.656
Michigan	8	–	10	.444	20	–	15	.571
Michigan State	7	–	11	.389	16	–	15	.516
Illinois	6	–	12	.333	15	–	16	.484
Wisconsin	5	–	13	.278	9	–	20	.310
Indiana	4	–	14	.222	15	–	16	.484
Purdue	3	–	15	.167	11	–	20	.355
Penn State	3	–	15	.167	6	–	24	.200
† 2015 Big Ten tournament winner As of April 5, 2015; Rankings from AP poll

The 2014–15 Indiana Hoosiers women's basketball team represented Indiana University Bloomington during the 2014–15 NCAA Division I women's basketball season. The Hoosiers, led by first-year head coach Teri Moren, played their home games at Assembly Hall and were members of the Big Ten Conference. They finished the season 15–16, 4–14 in Big Ten play to finish in twelfth place. They advanced to the second round of the Big Ten women's tournament, where they lost to Rutgers.

== Roster ==
2014–15 Indiana Hoosiers women's basketball team
Players
Coaches

Pos.	#	Name	Height	Year	Previous school	Hometown
G	2	Jess Walter	5 ft 11 in (1.8 m)	Fr	Midland	Midland, Mich.
G	3	Tyra Buss	5 ft 7 in (1.7 m)	Fr	Mt. Carmel	Mt. Carmel, Ill.
G	5	Larryn Brooks	5 ft 5 in (1.65 m)	So	Madison Central	Richmond, Ky.
G	10	Taylor Agler	5 ft 9 in (1.75 m)	So	Olentangy Orange	Westerville, Ohio
G	12	Nicole Bell	5 ft 4 in (1.63 m)	Jr	Indian Hill	Cincinnati, Ohio
F	14	Liz Stratman	6 ft 2 in (1.88 m)	Sr	Butler	New Palestine, Ind.
G/F	15	Kaila Hulls	5 ft 11 in (1.8 m)	RS Jr	Bloomington South	Bloomington, Ind.
G	20	Lizzy Pedigo	5 ft 8 in (1.73 m)	So	Franklin Central	Indianapolis, Ind.
G	23	Alexis Gassion	5 ft 10 in (1.78 m)	So	Fairborn	Fairborn, Ohio
G	24	Karlee McBride	5 ft 10 in (1.78 m)	So	Villa Maria	Erie, Pa.
G	31	Maura Muensterman	6 ft 0 in (1.83 m)	Fr	Mater Dei	Evansville, Ind.
G	32	Andrea Mize	5 ft 9 in (1.75 m)	Sr	Whiteland	Greenwood, Ind.
F	33	Amanda Cahill	6 ft 2 in (1.88 m)	Fr	Clyde	Clyde, Ohio
F	34	Claire Jakubicek	6 ft 0 in (1.83 m)	RS Jr	Cary-Grove	Cary, Ill.
F	40	Lyndsay Leikem	6 ft 1 in (1.85 m)	Jr	Flowing Wells	Tucson, Ariz.
C	43	Jenn Anderson	6 ft 3 in (1.91 m)	So	Westfield	Sheridan, Ind.

Head coach

Teri Moren

Assistant coach(es)

Curtis Loyd
Todd Starkey
Rhet Wierzba

Legend

- (C) Team captain
- (S) Suspended
- (I) Ineligible
- (W) Walk-on
- Injured
- Current redshirt

Roster

== Schedule ==
Date time, TV	Rank^{#}	Opponent^{#}	Result	Record	Site (attendance) city, state
Exhibition
11/09/2014*; 2:00 pm		Indianapolis	W 80–49	–	Assembly Hall (N/A); Bloomington, IN
Non-conference regular season
11/15/2014*; 2:00 pm		Gardner–Webb	W 115–54	1–0	Assembly Hall (2,472); Bloomington, IN
11/18/2014*; 7:00 pm		Valparaiso	W 81–49	2–0	Assembly Hall (1,985); Bloomington, IN
11/21/2014*; 7:00 pm		Morehead State	W 98–57	3–0	Assembly Hall (2,713); Bloomington, IN
11/23/2014*; 2:00 pm		Incarnate Word	W 85–49	4–0	Assembly Hall (2,140); Bloomington, IN
11/26/2014*; 7:00 pm		East Tennessee State	W 97–69	5–0	Assembly Hall (2,179); Bloomington, IN
11/30/2014*; 2:00 pm		Indiana State	L 61–65 ^{OT}	5–1	Assembly Hall (3,287); Bloomington, IN
12/03/2014*; 7:00 pm		at Boston College; ACC–Big Ten Women's Challenge	W 76–67	6–1	Conte Forum (353); Chestnut Hill, MA
12/07/2014*; 2:00 pm		IUPUI	W 68–55	7–1	Assembly Hall (2,503); Bloomington, IN
12/10/2014*; 7:00 pm		IPFW	W 80–37	8–1	Assembly Hall (2,261); Bloomington, IN
12/14/2014*; 2:00 pm, ESPN3		at Milwaukee	W 82–56	9–1	Klotsche Center (507); Milwaukee, WI
12/20/2014*; 2:00 pm		at Oakland	W 88–61	10–1	Athletics Center O'rena (619); Rochester, MI
Big Ten regular season
12/28/2014; 2:00 pm		No. 17 Rutgers	L 51–66	10–2 (0–1)	Assembly Hall (3,925); Bloomington, IN
12/31/2014; 7:00 pm		No. 24 Michigan State	W 70–51	11–2 (1–1)	Assembly Hall (2,714); Bloomington, IN
01/04/2015; 7:00 pm		at Purdue; Rivalry/Crimson and Gold Cup	L 64–86	11–3 (1–2)	Mackey Arena (6,990); West Lafayette, IN
01/08/2015; 7:00 pm		Ohio State	L 49–103	11–4 (1–3)	Assembly Hall (2,189); Bloomington, IN
01/11/2015; 2:00 pm		Wisconsin	W 67–52	12–4 (2–3)	Assembly Hall (3,155); Bloomington, IN
01/18/2015; 3:00 pm, BTN		at No. 23 Minnesota	L 61–65	12–5 (2–4)	Williams Arena (5,424); Minneapolis, MN
01/22/2015; 7:00 pm		at Penn State	L 75–79	12–6 (2–5)	Bryce Jordan Center (3,290); University Park, PA
01/25/2015; 3:00 pm, BTN		No. 8 Maryland	L 74–84	12–7 (2–6)	Assembly Hall (3,670); Bloomington, IN
01/28/2015; 7:00 pm		at Michigan State	L 57–72	12–8 (2–7)	Breslin Center (4,800); East Lansing, MI
02/02/2015; 8:30 pm, BTN		Purdue; Rivalry/Crimson and Gold Cup	W 72–55	13–8 (3–7)	Assembly Hall (2,468); Bloomington, IN
02/05/2015; 7:00 pm		Northwestern	L 69–75	13–9 (3–8)	Assembly Hall (2,094); Bloomington, IN
02/08/2015; 2:00 pm		at Ohio State	L 70–78	13–10 (3–9)	Value City Arena (7,639); Columbus, OH
02/11/2015; 7:00 pm		Illinois	W 85–58	14–10 (4–9)	Assembly Hall (2,236); Bloomington, IN
02/15/2015; 6:00 pm		at No. 14 Iowa	L 64–81	14–11 (4–10)	Carver–Hawkeye Arena (8,748); Iowa City, IA
02/18/2015; 7:00 pm		at Michigan	L 52–68	14–12 (4–11)	Crisler Center (1,806); Ann Arbor, MI
02/21/2015; 12:00 pm, BTN		No. 21 Nebraska	L 64–67	14–13 (4–12)	Assembly Hall (2,490); Bloomington, IN
02/26/2015; 7:00 pm		at No. 5 Maryland	L 72–83	14–14 (4–13)	Xfinity Center (5,601); College Park, MD
03/01/2015; 2:00 pm		at No. 20 Rutgers	L 60–71	14–15 (4–14)	The RAC (3,374); Piscataway, NJ
Big Ten Women's Tournament
03/04/2015; 6:00 pm		vs. Penn State; First Round	W 68–63	15–15	Sears Centre (N/A); Hoffman Estates, IL
03/04/2015; 3:00 pm, BTN		vs. No. 23 Rutgers; Second Round	L 52–63	15–16	Sears Centre (4,941); Hoffman Estates, IL
*Non-conference game. ^{#}Rankings from AP Poll. (#) Tournament seedings in parentheses. All times are in Eastern Time.

== See also ==
- 2014–15 Indiana Hoosiers men's basketball team
