= 2014–15 Ohio State Buckeyes women's basketball team =

Intercollegiate basketball season

2014–15 Ohio State Buckeyes women's basketball

NCAA Women's tournament, second round
- Conference: Big Ten Conference

Ranking
- Coaches: No. 23
- AP: No. 23
- Record: 24–11 (13–5 Big Ten)
- Head coach: Kevin McGuff (2nd season)
- Assistant coaches: Joy Cheek; Patrick Klein; Mark Mitchell
- Home arena: Value City Arena

2014–15 Big Ten women's basketball standings
	Conf.				Overall
Team	W		L	PCT	W		L	PCT
No. 4 Maryland†	18	–	0	1.000	34	–	3	.919
No. 18 Iowa	14	–	4	.778	26	–	8	.765
No. 23 Ohio State	13	–	5	.722	24	–	11	.686
No. 22 Northwestern	12	–	6	.667	23	–	9	.719
Rutgers	12	–	6	.667	23	–	10	.697
Minnesota	11	–	7	.611	23	–	10	.697
Nebraska	10	–	8	.556	21	–	11	.656
Michigan	8	–	10	.444	20	–	15	.571
Michigan State	7	–	11	.389	16	–	15	.516
Illinois	6	–	12	.333	15	–	16	.484
Wisconsin	5	–	13	.278	9	–	20	.310
Indiana	4	–	14	.222	15	–	16	.484
Purdue	3	–	15	.167	11	–	20	.355
Penn State	3	–	15	.167	6	–	24	.200
† 2015 Big Ten tournament winner As of April 5, 2015; Rankings from AP poll

The 2014–15 Ohio State Buckeyes women's basketball team represented the Ohio State University during the 2014–15 NCAA Division I women's basketball season. The Buckeyes, led by second-year head coach Kevin McGuff, played their home games at Value City Arena and were members of the Big Ten Conference. They finished the season 24–11, 13–5 in Big Ten play to finish in third place. They advanced to the championship game of the Big Ten women's basketball tournament, where they lost to Maryland. They received an at-large bid to the NCAA women's tournament, where they defeated James Madison in the first round before losing the gamewinning buzzer beater to North Carolina in the second round to end their season.

== Roster ==
2014–15 Ohio State Buckeyes women's basketball team
Players
Coaches

Pos.	#	Name	Height	Year	Previous school	Hometown
F	1	Kalpana Beach	6 ft 1 in (1.85 m)	RS So	Westlake	Westlake, Ohio
G	3	Kelsey Mitchell	5 ft 8 in (1.73 m)	Fr	Princeton	Cincinnati, Ohio
F	5	Chelsea Mitchell	5 ft 11 in (1.8 m)	Fr	Princeton	Cincinnati, Ohio
G	12	Kianna Holland	5 ft 9 in (1.75 m)	Fr	Seneca	Seneca, S.C.
G	13	Cait Craft	5 ft 8 in (1.73 m)	Jr	Liberty-Benton	Findlay, Ohio
G	14	Ameryst Alston	5 ft 9 in (1.75 m)	Jr	McKinley	Canton, Ohio
G	20	Asia Doss	5 ft 7 in (1.7 m)	Fr	Country Day School	Detroit, Mich.
C	21	Lisa Blair	6 ft 6 in (1.98 m)	RS So	Nazareth Regional	Brooklyn, N.Y.
F	22	Alexa Hart	6 ft 3 in (1.91 m)	Fr	Africentric	Columbus, Ohio
F	24	Makayla Waterman	6 ft 2 in (1.88 m)	Fr	Fairmont	Kettering, Ohio
F	32	Shayla Cooper	6 ft 2 in (1.88 m)	So	Georgetown	Norcross, Ga.

Head coach

Kevin McGuff

Assistant coach(es)

Joy Cheek
Patrick Klein
Mark Mitchell

Legend

- (C) Team captain
- (S) Suspended
- (I) Ineligible
- (W) Walk-on
- Injured
- Current redshirt

Roster

== Schedule ==
Date time, TV	Rank^{#}	Opponent^{#}	Result	Record	Site (attendance) city, state
Exhibition
11/09/2014*; 1:00 pm		Eckerd	W 92–73	–	Value City Arena (3,775); Columbus, OH
Non-conference regular season
11/14/2014*; 7:00 pm		at Virginia	L 82–87	0–1	John Paul Jones Arena (3,358); Charlottesville, VA
11/16/2014*; 2:00 pm		Saint Francis (PA)	W 113–97	1–1	Value City Arena (3,968); Columbus, OH
11/19/2014*; 7:00 pm		No. 24 Georgia	L 59–67	1–2	Value City Arena (3,844); Columbus, OH
11/23/2014*; 2:00 pm		VCU	W 96–86	2–2	Value City Arena (4,201); Columbus, OH
11/27/2014*; 1:15 pm		vs. Clemson; Paradise Jam tournament	W 86–77	3–2	Sports and Fitness Center (207); Saint Thomas, USVI
11/28/2014*; 1:15 pm		vs. Wichita State; Paradise Jam Tournament	L 50–70	3–3	Sports and Fitness Center (238); Saint Thomas, USVI
11/29/2014*; 3:30 pm		vs. Florida Gulf Coast; Paradise Jam Tournament	W 90–83 ^{2OT}	4–3	Sports and Fitness Center (421); Saint Thomas, USVI
12/03/2014*; 7:00 pm		Pittsburgh; ACC–Big Ten Women's Challenge	L 74–78	4–4	Value City Arena (3,777); Columbus, OH
12/07/2014*; 2:00 pm		Winthrop	W 66–52	5–4	Value City Arena (4,384); Columbus, OH
12/11/2014*; 7:00 pm		Arkansas State	W 67–52	6–4	Value City Arena (3,719); Columbus, OH
12/14/2014*; 2:00 pm		Western Michigan	W 82–46	7–4	Value City Arena (4,298); Columbus, OH
12/22/2014*; 2:00 pm		No. 22 West Virginia	W 96–54	8–4	Value City Arena (5,048); Columbus, OH
Big Ten regular season
12/29/2014; 7:00 pm, BTN		at No. 12 Maryland	L 78–87	8–5 (0–1)	Xfinity Center (5,671); College Park, MD
01/01/2015; 2:00 pm		No. 16 Rutgers	W 85–68	9–5 (1–1)	Value City Arena (4,557); Columbus, OH
01/04/2015; 2:00 pm, BTN		Northwestern	W 73–64	10–5 (2–1)	Value City Arena (5,402); Columbus, OH
01/08/2015; 7:00 pm		at Indiana	W 103–49	11–5 (3–1)	Assembly Hall (2,189); Bloomington, IN
01/11/2015; 2:00 pm		at Michigan; Rivalry	L 94–100 ^{OT}	11–6 (3–2)	Crisler Center (3,351); Ann Arbor, MI
01/15/2015; 7:00 pm		No. 23 Minnesota	L 72–76	11–7 (3–3)	Value City Arena (4,509); Columbus, OH
01/18/2015; 2:00 pm		Penn State	W 69–60	12–7 (4–3)	Value City Arena (6,346); Columbus, OH
01/25/2015; 2:00 pm		at Purdue	W 79–71	13–7 (5–3)	Mackey Arena (6,801); West Lafayette, IN
01/29/2015; 9:00 pm, BTN		at Wisconsin	W 85–73	14–7 (6–3)	Kohl Center (3,296); Madison, WI
02/02/2015; 6:30 pm, BTN		Michigan State	W 76–62	15–7 (7–3)	Value City Arena (4,234); Columbus, OH
02/05/2015; 8:00 pm		at No. 16 Iowa	L 65–73	15–8 (7–4)	Carver–Hawkeye Arena (4,572); Iowa City, IA
02/08/2015; 2:00 pm		Indiana	W 78–70	16–8 (8–4)	Value City Arena (7,639); Columbus, OH
02/12/2015; 7:00 pm		Michigan; Rivalry	W 77–73	17–8 (9–4)	Value City Arena (4,668); Columbus, OH
02/14/2015; 4:00 pm, BTN		at Illinois	L 55–66	17–9 (9–5)	State Farm Center (2,708); Champaign, IL
02/17/2015; 7:00 pm, BTN		Purdue	W 92–60	18–9 (10–5)	Value City Arena (4,185); Columbus, OH
02/21/2015; 7:00 pm, BTN		No. 13 Iowa	W 100–82	19–9 (11–5)	Value City Arena (6,471); Columbus, OH
02/26/2015; 7:00 pm		at Penn State	W 88–70	20–9 (12–5)	Bryce Jordan Center (3,529); University Park, PA
03/01/2015; 5:00 pm, BTN		at Nebraska	W 78–60	21–9 (13–5)	Pinnacle Bank Arena (8,418); Lincoln, NE
2015 Big Ten Conference Women's tournament
03/06/2015; 9:30 pm, BTN		vs. Minnesota; Quarterfinals	W 83–71	22–9	Sears Centre (4,781); Hoffman Estates, IL
03/07/2015; 9:30 pm, BTN		vs. No. 14 Iowa; Semifinals	W 91–85 ^{OT}	23–9	Sears Centre (5,642); Hoffman Estates, IL
03/08/2015; 7:00 pm, ESPN		vs. No. 4 Maryland; Championship Game	L 74–77	23–10	Sears Centre (4,131); Hoffman Estates, IL
NCAA Women's tournament
03/21/2015*; 1:30 pm, ESPN2	No. 23	vs. James Madison; First Round	W 90–80	24–10	Carmichael Arena (2,233); Chapel Hill, NC
03/23/2015*; 6:30 pm, ESPN2	No. 23	at No. 15 North Carolina; Second Round	L 84–86	24–11	Carmichael Arena (2,163); Chapel Hill, NC
*Non-conference game. ^{#}Rankings from AP Poll. (#) Tournament seedings in parentheses. All times are in Eastern Time.

== Rankings ==
Ranking movement Legend: ██ Increase in ranking. ██ Decrease in ranking. NR = Not ranked. RV = Received votes.
Poll	Pre	Wk 2	Wk 3	Wk 4	Wk 5	Wk 6	Wk 7	Wk 8	Wk 9	Wk 10	Wk 11	Wk 12	Wk 13	Wk 14	Wk 15	Wk 16	Wk 17	Wk 18	Final
AP	NR	NR	NR	NR	NR	NR	NR	NR	RV	RV	NR	NR	NR	NR	NR	RV	RV	23	23
Coaches	RV	RV	NR	NR	NR	NR	NR	NR	NR	NR	NR	NR	NR	NR	NR	RV	RV	24	23

== See also ==
- 2014–15 Ohio State Buckeyes men's basketball team
