= 2014–15 Minnesota Golden Gophers women's basketball team =

Intercollegiate basketball season

2014–15 Minnesota Golden Gophers women's basketball

NCAA Women's Tournament, first round
- Conference: Big Ten Conference
- Record: 23–10 (11–7 Big Ten)
- Head coach: Marlene Stollings (1st season)
- Assistant coaches: Nikita Lowry Dawkins; Fred Chmiel; John Motherwell
- Home arena: Williams Arena

2014–15 Big Ten women's basketball standings
	Conf.				Overall
Team	W		L	PCT	W		L	PCT
No. 4 Maryland†	18	–	0	1.000	34	–	3	.919
No. 18 Iowa	14	–	4	.778	26	–	8	.765
No. 23 Ohio State	13	–	5	.722	24	–	11	.686
No. 22 Northwestern	12	–	6	.667	23	–	9	.719
Rutgers	12	–	6	.667	23	–	10	.697
Minnesota	11	–	7	.611	23	–	10	.697
Nebraska	10	–	8	.556	21	–	11	.656
Michigan	8	–	10	.444	20	–	15	.571
Michigan State	7	–	11	.389	16	–	15	.516
Illinois	6	–	12	.333	15	–	16	.484
Wisconsin	5	–	13	.278	9	–	20	.310
Indiana	4	–	14	.222	15	–	16	.484
Purdue	3	–	15	.167	11	–	20	.355
Penn State	3	–	15	.167	6	–	24	.200
† 2015 Big Ten tournament winner As of April 5, 2015; Rankings from AP poll

The 2014–15 Minnesota Golden Gophers women's basketball team represented the University of Minnesota in the 2014-15 college basketball season. Led by first-year head coach Marlene Stollings, the Golden Gophers, members of the Big Ten Conference, played their home games at Williams Arena in Minneapolis, Minnesota. They finished the season 23–10, 11–7 in Big Ten play to finish in sixth place. They advanced to the quarterfinals of the Big Ten women's tournament, where they lost to Ohio State. They received an at-large bid to the NCAA women's tournament, where they were defeated by DePaul in the first round.

== Roster ==
2014–15 Minnesota Golden Gophers women's basketball team
Players
Coaches

Pos.	#	Name	Height	Year	Previous school	Hometown
G	24	Mikayla Bailey	5 ft 9 in (1.75 m)	Jr	Osseo HS	Maple Grove, Minn.
G	1	Rachel Banham	5 ft 9 in (1.75 m)	Sr	Lakeville North HS	Lakeville, Minn.
F	35	Rangie Bessard	6 ft 0 in (1.83 m)	Fr	Manvel HS	Rosharon, Texas
C	52	Josie Buckingham	6 ft 5 in (1.96 m)	Fr	New Richmond HS	New Richmond, Ohio
G	11	Grace Coughlin	5 ft 8 in (1.73 m)	Fr	Benilde-St. Margaret's School	Edina, Minn.
G	22	Joanna Hedstrom	6 ft 1 in (1.85 m)	So	Minnetonka HS	Minnetonka, Minn.
G/F	20	Kayla Hirt	6 ft 2 in (1.88 m)	Jr	Bemidji HS	Bemidji, Minn.
G/F	5	Tory Jacobs	5 ft 10 in (1.78 m)	Fr	Irving MacArthur HS	Irving, Texas
F	4	Jackie Johnson	6 ft 2 in (1.88 m)	Jr	Eden Prairie HS	Eden Prairie, Minn.
F	23	Shae Kelley	6 ft 1 in (1.85 m)	Sr	Old Dominion	Denver, Colo.
G	2	Stabresa McDaniel	5 ft 10 in (1.78 m)	So	Skyline HS	Dallas, Texas
G	3	Shayne Mullaney	5 ft 10 in (1.78 m)	Jr	Eden Prairie HS	Eden Prairie, Minn.
G	33	Carlie Wagner	5 ft 10 in (1.78 m)	Fr	New Richland-Hartland-Ellendale-Geneva HS	New Richland, Minn.
C	32	Amanda Zahui B.	6 ft 5 in (1.96 m)	RS So	Igelstavikens Gymnasium	Stockholm, Sweden

Head coach

Marlene Stollings

Assistant coach(es)

Nikita Lowry Dawkins
Fred Chmiel
John Motherwell

Legend

- (C) Team captain
- (S) Suspended
- (I) Ineligible
- (W) Walk-on
- Injured
- Current redshirt

Roster

== Schedule and results ==
Date time, TV	Rank^{#}	Opponent^{#}	Result	Record	Site (attendance) city, state
Non conference regular season
11/14/2014*; 7:00 pm		Southeastern Louisiana	W 109–60	1–0	Williams Arena (3,879); Minneapolis, MN
11/19/2014*; 12:00 pm		Cleveland State	W 93–76	2–0	Williams Arena (2,447); Minneapolis, MN
11/23/2014*; 2:00 pm		at Memphis	W 68–62	3–0	Elma Roane Fieldhouse (892); Memphis, TN
11/25/2014*; 7:00 pm		Southern	W 107–62	4–0	Williams Arena (2,235); Minneapolis, MN
11/28/2014*; 5:00 pm		vs. Vanderbilt; Gulf Coast Showcase Quarterfinals	L 54–71	4–1	Germain Arena (N/A); Estero, FL
11/29/2014*; 1:30 pm		vs. College of Charleston; Gulf Coast Showcase consolation 2nd round	W 74–50	5–1	Germain Arena (N/A); Estero, FL
11/30/2014*; 1:30 pm		vs. Georgia Tech; Gulf Coast Showcase 5th place game	W 72–69	6–1	Germain Arena (N/A); Estero, FL
12/03/2014*; 6:00 pm, ESPN3		at NC State; ACC–Big Ten Women's Challenge	W 60–55	7–1	Reynolds Coliseum (1,535); Raleigh, NC
12/07/2014*; 6:00 pm		Butler	W 88–86 ^{OT}	8–1	Williams Arena (3,477); Minneapolis, MN
12/10/2014*; 7:00 pm, FSNOR+		at North Dakota	W 68–55	9–1	Betty Engelstad Sioux Center (2,734); Grand Forks, ND
12/20/2014*; 2:30 pm		Liberty; Subway Classic	W 74–68	10–1	Williams Arena (2,858); Minneapolis, MN
12/21/2014*; 2:30 pm		Western Michigan; Subway Classic	W 67–64	11–1	Williams Arena (2,659); Minneapolis, MN
Big Ten regular season
12/29/2014; 8:00 pm, BTN		No. 12 Nebraska	W 72–69	12–1 (1–0)	Williams Arena (3,300); Minneapolis, MN
01/01/2015; 1:00 pm		at Purdue	W 81–68	13–1 (2–0)	Mackey Arena (6,361); West Lafayette, IN
01/04/2015; 2:00 pm		at Wisconsin	W 72–60	14–1 (3–0)	Kohl Center (3,814); Madison, WI
01/11/2015; 2:00 pm, ESPN2	No. 23	No. 12 Maryland	L 73–77	14–2 (3–1)	Williams Arena (5,468); Minneapolis, MN
01/15/2015; 6:00 pm	No. 23	at Ohio State	W 76–72	15–2 (4–1)	Value City Arena (4,509); Columbus, OH
01/18/2015; 2:00 pm, BTN	No. 23	Indiana	W 65–61	16–2 (5–1)	Williams Arena (5,424); Minneapolis, MN
01/22/2015; 7:00 pm	No. 21	Purdue	L 88–90 ^{OT}	16–3 (5–2)	Williams Arena (3,714); Minneapolis, MN
01/25/2015; 4:15 pm, BTN	No. 21	at No. 25 Rutgers	L 61–66	16–4 (5–3)	The RAC (2,811); Piscataway, NJ
01/28/2015; 7:00 pm		Penn State	W 75–64	17–4 (6–3)	Williams Arena (2,738); Minneapolis, MN
02/01/2015; 2:00 pm		at Northwestern	L 49–70	17–5 (6–4)	Welsh-Ryan Arena (918); Evanston, IL
02/05/2015; 8:00 pm, BTN		at Illinois	L 69–95	17–6 (6–5)	State Farm Center (1,693); Champaign, IL
02/08/2015; 2:00 pm		Michigan State	W 86–79	18–6 (7–5)	Williams Arena (6,570); Minneapolis, MN
02/11/2015; 7:00 pm		Wisconsin	W 93–82	19–6 (8–5)	Williams Arena (3,609); Minneapolis, MN
02/15/2015; 1:00 pm		at Penn State	W 85–77	20–6 (9–5)	Bryce Jordan Center (4,462); University Park, PA
02/17/2015; 8:00 pm, BTN		No. 13 Iowa	W 93–80	21–6 (10–5)	Williams Arena (3,265); Minneapolis, MN
02/21/2015; 1:00 pm, BTN		Michigan	W 91–88 ^{2OT}	22–6 (11–5)	Williams Arena (6,053); Minneapolis, MN
02/24/2015; 8:00 pm, BTN		at Nebraska	L 50–74	22–7 (11–6)	Pinnacle Bank Arena (5,290); Lincoln, NE
03/01/2015; 2:00 pm		at No. 17 Iowa	L 76–92	22–8 (11–7)	Carver–Hawkeye Arena (9,726); Iowa City, IA
Big Ten Women's Tournament
03/05/2015; 8:30 pm, BTN		vs. Purdue; Second Round	W 82–78	23–8	Sears Centre (3,681); Hoffman Estates, IL
03/06/2015; 8:30 pm, BTN		vs. Ohio State; Quarterfinals	L 71–83	23–9	Sears Centre (4,781); Hoffman Estates, IL
NCAA Women's Tournament
03/20/2015*; 4:00 pm, ESPN2		vs. DePaul; First Round	L 72–79	23–10	Edmund P. Joyce Center (N/A); South Bend, IN
*Non-conference game. ^{#}Rankings from AP Poll. (#) Tournament seedings in parentheses. All times are in Central Time.

== Rankings ==
Ranking movement Legend: ██ Increase in ranking. ██ Decrease in ranking. NR = Not ranked. RV = Received votes.
Poll	Pre	Wk 2	Wk 3	Wk 4	Wk 5	Wk 6	Wk 7	Wk 8	Wk 9	Wk 10	Wk 11	Wk 12	Wk 13	Wk 14	Wk 15	Wk 16	Wk 17	Wk 18	Final
AP	RV	RV	RV	RV	RV	NR	NR	NR	23	23	21	RV	RV	NR	RV	RV	NR	NR	NR
Coaches	NR	NR	NR	NR	NR	NR	NR	NR	RV	NR	RV	NR	NR	NR	NR	RV	NR	NR	NR

== See also ==
- 2014–15 Minnesota Golden Gophers men's basketball team
