= 2014–15 Rutgers Scarlet Knights women's basketball team =

Intercollegiate basketball season

2014–15 Rutgers Scarlet Knights women's basketball

NCAA women's tournament, second round
- Conference: Big Ten Conference

Ranking
- Coaches: No. 22
- Record: 23–10 (12–6 Big Ten)
- Head coach: C. Vivian Stringer (20th season)
- Assistant coaches: Tia Jackson; Tasha Pointer; Chelsea Newton
- Home arena: Louis Brown Athletic Center

2014–15 Big Ten women's basketball standings
	Conf.				Overall
Team	W		L	PCT	W		L	PCT
No. 4 Maryland†	18	–	0	1.000	34	–	3	.919
No. 18 Iowa	14	–	4	.778	26	–	8	.765
No. 23 Ohio State	13	–	5	.722	24	–	11	.686
No. 22 Northwestern	12	–	6	.667	23	–	9	.719
Rutgers	12	–	6	.667	23	–	10	.697
Minnesota	11	–	7	.611	23	–	10	.697
Nebraska	10	–	8	.556	21	–	11	.656
Michigan	8	–	10	.444	20	–	15	.571
Michigan State	7	–	11	.389	16	–	15	.516
Illinois	6	–	12	.333	15	–	16	.484
Wisconsin	5	–	13	.278	9	–	20	.310
Indiana	4	–	14	.222	15	–	16	.484
Purdue	3	–	15	.167	11	–	20	.355
Penn State	3	–	15	.167	6	–	24	.200
† 2015 Big Ten tournament winner As of April 5, 2015; Rankings from AP poll

The 2014–15 Rutgers Scarlet Knights women's basketball team represented Rutgers University during the 2014–15 NCAA Division I women's basketball season. The Scarlet Knights, led by twentieth-year head coach C. Vivian Stringer, played their home games at the Louis Brown Athletic Center, better known as The RAC, as first-year members of the Big Ten Conference. They finished the season 23–10, 12–6 in Big Ten play, to finish in a tie for fourth place. They advanced to the quarterfinals of the Big Ten women's tournament, where they lost to Northwestern. They received at-large to the NCAA women's tournament, where they defeated Seton Hall in the first round before losing to the national champions, Connecticut in the second round.

== Roster ==
2014–15 Rutgers Scarlet Knights women's basketball team
Players
Coaches

Pos.	#	Name	Height	Year	Previous school	Hometown
C	1	Rachel Hollivay	6 ft 4 in (1.93 m)	Jr	Heritage Academy	Columbus, MS
G/F	2	Kahleah Copper	6 ft 1 in (1.85 m)	Jr	Prep Charter	Philadelphia, PA
G	3	Tyler Scaife	5 ft 9 in (1.75 m)	So	Hall	Little Rock, AR
G	4	Briyona Canty	5 ft 9 in (1.75 m)	RS Jr	Trenton Catholic	Willingboro, NJ
G	5	Natalie Parsons	5 ft 9 in (1.75 m)	Jr	Woods Cross/Salt Lake CC	Bountiful, UT
G	10	Shrita Parker	5 ft 7 in (1.7 m)	Fr	Ocean Lakes	Virginia Beach, VA
G/F	11	Ashli Jeune	6 ft 1 in (1.85 m)	Fr	Life Center Academy	Westampton, NJ
G	13	Cynthia Hernandez	5 ft 7 in (1.7 m)	Jr	Buena/Ventura College	Ventura, CA
G	15	Syessence Davis	5 ft 7 in (1.7 m)	Sr	Neptune	Neptune, NJ
C	20	Christa Evans	6 ft 3 in (1.91 m)	Sr	Jackson Memorial	Jackson, NJ
F	22	Alexis Burke	5 ft 11 in (1.8 m)	RS Sr	Bainbridge/Illinois	Bainbridge, GA
G	33	Alex Alfano	5 ft 8 in (1.73 m)	So	Red Bank Catholic	Atlantic Highlands, NJ
C	43	Ariel Butts	6 ft 3 in (1.91 m)	Jr	Carver	Columbus, GA
G/F	44	Betnijah Laney	6 ft 0 in (1.83 m)	Sr	Smyrna	Clayton, DE

Head coach

C. Vivian Stringer

Assistant coach(es)

Tia Jackson
Tasha Pointer
Chelsea Newton

Legend

- (C) Team captain
- (S) Suspended
- (I) Ineligible
- (W) Walk-on
- Injured
- Current redshirt

Roster
Last update: June 14, 2024

== Schedule ==
Date time, TV	Rank^{#}	Opponent^{#}	Result	Record	Site (attendance) city, state
Non-conference regular season
11/14/2014*; 7:00 p.m.	No. 24	Saint Joseph's	W 76–52	1–0	Louis Brown Athletic Center (1,805); Piscataway, NJ
11/18/2014*; 7:00 p.m.	No. 22	Northeastern	W 74–60	2–0	Louis Brown Athletic Center (1,213); Piscataway, NJ
11/22/2014*; 2:00 p.m.	No. 22	at LSU	W 64–57	3–0	Maravich Center (2,846); Baton Rouge, LA
11/25/2014*; 7:00 p.m.	No. 21	at Wagner	W 81–53	4–0	Spiro Sports Center (1,608); Staten Island, NY
11/28/2014*; 2:00 p.m.	No. 21	Colgate	W 60–44	5–0	Louis Brown Athletic Center (1,428); Piscataway, NJ
11/30/2014*; 1:00 p.m.	No. 21	Davidson	W 100–44	6–0	Louis Brown Athletic Center (1,513); Piscataway, NJ
12/04/2014*; 7:00 p.m., BTN	No. 18	No. 6 North Carolina; ACC–Big Ten Women's Challenge	L 93–96 ^{2OT}	6–1	Louis Brown Athletic Center (2,028); Piscataway, NJ
12/07/2014*; 2:00 p.m.	No. 18	at No. 25 Arkansas	W 64–52	7–1	Bud Walton Arena (1,997); Fayetteville, AR
12/10/2014*; 6:00 p.m.	No. 17	at Temple	W 88–55	8–1	McGonigle Hall (867); Philadelphia, PA
12/14/2014*; 3:00 p.m., ESPN2	No. 17	No. 11 Tennessee	L 45–55	8–2	Louis Brown Athletic Center (4,543); Piscataway, NJ
12/20/2014*; 2:00 p.m.	No. 17	at Iona	W 66–58	9–2	Hynes Athletic Center (942); New Rochelle, NY
Big Ten regular season
12/28/2014; 2:00 p.m.	No. 17	at Indiana	W 66–51	10–2 (1–0)	Assembly Hall (3,925); Bloomington, IN
01/01/2015; 2:00 p.m.	No. 16	at Ohio State	L 68–85	10–3 (1–1)	Value City Arena (4,557); Columbus, OH
01/04/2015; 12:00 p.m., BTN	No. 16	No. 20 Iowa	L 72–79	10–4 (1–2)	Louis Brown Athletic Center (2,542); Piscataway, NJ
01/07/2015; 7:00 p.m.	No. 24	Michigan	W 81–68	11–4 (2–2)	Louis Brown Athletic Center (2,554); Piscataway, NJ
01/10/2015; 12:00 p.m., BTN	No. 24	at Penn State	W 71–51	12–4 (3–2)	Bryce Jordan Center (3,705); University Park, PA
01/15/2015; 9:00 p.m., BTN	No. 24	No. 8 Maryland	L 59–79	12–5 (3–3)	Louis Brown Athletic Center (2,116); Piscataway, NJ
01/18/2015; 3:00 p.m.	No. 24	at Wisconsin	W 73–63	13–5 (4–3)	Kohl Center (4,114); Madison, WI
01/25/2015; 5:15 p.m., BTN	No. 25	No. 21 Minnesota	W 66–61	14–5 (5–3)	Louis Brown Athletic Center (2,811); Piscataway, NJ
01/29/2015; 7:00 p.m., BTN	No. 22	at Purdue	W 58–49	15–5 (6–3)	Mackey Arena (5,780); West Lafayette, IN
02/01/2015; 12:00 p.m., BTN	No. 22	Penn State	W 76–65	16–5 (7–3)	Louis Brown Athletic Center (2,931); Piscataway, NJ
02/05/2015; 7:00 p.m., BTN	No. 21	No. 19 Nebraska	W 46–43	17–5 (8–3)	Louis Brown Athletic Center (2,436); Piscataway, NJ
02/08/2015; 7:00 p.m.	No. 21	at Michigan	W 57–50	18–5 (9–3)	Crisler Center (3,478); Ann Arbor, MI
02/10/2015; 9:00 p.m., BTN	No. 18	at No. 5 Maryland	L 69–80	18–6 (9–4)	Xfinity Center (3,636); College Park, MD
02/14/2015; 12:00 p.m., BTN	No. 18	Purdue	W 78–49	19–6 (10–4)	Louis Brown Athletic Center (2,713); Piscataway, NJ
02/17/2015; 7:00 p.m.	No. 19	Illinois	W 80–56	20–6 (11–4)	Louis Brown Athletic Center (2,329); Piscataway, NJ
02/22/2015; 2:00 p.m., ESPN2	No. 19	at Michigan State	L 50–60	20–7 (11–5)	Breslin Center (8,110); East Lansing, MI
02/26/2015; 8:00 p.m.	No. 20	at No. 25 Northwestern	L 60–80	20–8 (11–6)	Welsh-Ryan Arena (903); Evanston, IL
03/01/2015; 2:00 p.m.	No. 20	Indiana	W 71–60	21–8 (12–6)	Louis Brown Athletic Center (3,374); Piscataway, NJ
Big Ten women's tournament
03/05/2015; 3:00 p.m., BTN	No. 23	vs. Indiana; Second round	W 63–52	22–8	Sears Centre (4,941); Hoffman Estates, IL
03/06/2015; 3:00 p.m., BTN	No. 23	vs. No. 24 Northwestern; Quarterfinals	L 57–62	22–9	Sears Centre (5,293); Hoffman Estates, IL
NCAA women's tournament
03/21/2015*; 6:30 p.m., ESPN2		vs. Seton Hall; First round	W 79–66	23–9	Gampel Pavilion (N/A); Storrs, CT
03/23/2015*; 9:00 p.m., ESPN2		at No. 1 Connecticut; Second round/Rivalry	L 55–91	23–10	Gampel Pavilion (3,486); Storrs, CT
*Non-conference game. ^{#}Rankings from AP poll. (#) Tournament seedings in parentheses. All times are in Eastern.

== Rankings ==
Ranking movement Legend: ██ Increase in ranking ██ Decrease in ranking. NR = Not ranked. RV = Received votes
Poll	Pre	Wk 2	Wk 3	Wk 4	Wk 5	Wk 6	Wk 7	Wk 8	Wk 9	Wk 10	Wk 11	Wk 12	Wk 13	Wk 14	Wk 15	Wk 16	Wk 17	Wk 18	Final
AP	24т	22	21	18	17	17	17	16	24	24	25	22	21	18	19	20	23	RV	RV
Coaches	RV	24	24	20	19	19	18	17	23	22	23	23	22	17	18	18	22	23	22

== See also ==
- 2014–15 Rutgers Scarlet Knights men's basketball team
