= 2014–15 Penn State Lady Lions basketball team =

Intercollegiate basketball season

2014–15 Penn State Lady Lions basketball
- Conference: Big Ten Conference
- Record: 6–24 (3–15 Big Ten)
- Head coach: Coquese Washington
- Assistant coaches: Itoro Coleman; Kia Damon; Jocelyn Wyatt
- Home arena: Bryce Jordan Center

2014–15 Big Ten women's basketball standings
	Conf.				Overall
Team	W		L	PCT	W		L	PCT
No. 4 Maryland†	18	–	0	1.000	34	–	3	.919
No. 18 Iowa	14	–	4	.778	26	–	8	.765
No. 23 Ohio State	13	–	5	.722	24	–	11	.686
No. 22 Northwestern	12	–	6	.667	23	–	9	.719
Rutgers	12	–	6	.667	23	–	10	.697
Minnesota	11	–	7	.611	23	–	10	.697
Nebraska	10	–	8	.556	21	–	11	.656
Michigan	8	–	10	.444	20	–	15	.571
Michigan State	7	–	11	.389	16	–	15	.516
Illinois	6	–	12	.333	15	–	16	.484
Wisconsin	5	–	13	.278	9	–	20	.310
Indiana	4	–	14	.222	15	–	16	.484
Purdue	3	–	15	.167	11	–	20	.355
Penn State	3	–	15	.167	6	–	24	.200
† 2015 Big Ten tournament winner As of April 5, 2015; Rankings from AP poll

The 2014–15 Penn State Lady Lions basketball team represented Pennsylvania State University during the 2014–15 NCAA Division I women's basketball season. The Lady Lions, led by eighth year head coach Coquese Washington, played their home games at the Bryce Jordan Center and were members of the Big Ten Conference. They finished the season 6–24, 3–15 in Big Ten play to finish in tie for thirteenth place. They lost in the first round of the Big Ten women's tournament to Indiana.

== Roster ==
2014–15 Penn State Nittany Lions women's basketball team
Players
Coaches

Pos.	#	Name	Height	Year	Previous school	Hometown
F/C	1	Candice Agee	6 ft 6 in (1.98 m)	Jr	Silverado	Victorville, Calif.
G	3	Brianna Banks (redshirt)	5 ft 9 in (1.75 m)	RS Sr	Fayette County	Newnan, Ga.
G	5	Sierra Moore	5 ft 11 in (1.8 m)	RS So	Delone Catholic	Hanover, Pa.
G	10	Keke Sevillian	5 ft 7 in (1.7 m)	So	Goodrich	Goodrich, Mich.
F	11	Alex Harris	6 ft 3 in (1.91 m)	So	Lorain	Lorain, Ohio
G	12	Lindsey Spann	5 ft 6 in (1.68 m)	RS Fr	Good Counsel	Laurel, Md.
F	14	Dominique Brooks	6 ft 4 in (1.93 m)	Jr	T.F. South	Lansing, Ill.
G/F	15	Kaliyah Mitchell	6 ft 2 in (1.88 m)	So	Stephenson	Stone Mountain, Ga.
G/F	25	Peyton Whitted	6 ft 3 in (1.91 m)	So	North Gwinnett	Suwanee, Ga.
G/F	41	Jenny DeGraaf	6 ft 1 in (1.85 m)	So	Springboro	Springboro, Ohio
F/C	44	Tori Waldner	6 ft 5 in (1.96 m)	Sr	Milton	Milton, Ga.

Head coach

Coquese Washington

Assistant coach(es)

Itoro Coleman
Kia Damon
Jocelyn Wyatt

Legend

- (C) Team captain
- (S) Suspended
- (I) Ineligible
- (W) Walk-on
- Injured
- Current redshirt

Roster
Last update: 2014-09-14

== Schedule ==
Date time, TV	Rank^{#}	Opponent^{#}	Result	Record	Site (attendance) city, state
Exhibition
11/02/2014*; 2:00 pm		Indiana (PA)	W 75–71	–	Bryce Jordan Center (3,327); University Park, PA
Non-conference regular season
11/14/2014*; 12:00 pm		Towson; Preseason WNIT First Round	W 71–64	1–0	Bryce Jordan Center (3,123); University Park, PA
11/16/2014*; 7:00 pm		Albany; Preseason WNIT Second Round	L 53–54	1–1	Bryce Jordan Center (8,607); University Park, PA
11/22/2014*; 7:00 pm		Seton Hall; Preseason WNIT Consolation Round	L 70–75	1–2	Bryce Jordan Center (3,114); University Park, PA
11/25/2014*; 5:30 pm		St. Bonaventure	L 54–56	1–3	Bryce Jordan Center (6,703); University Park, PA
11/28/2014*; 2:00 pm		vs. Liberty; Georgia State Thanksgiving Tournament semifinals	L 68–80	1–4	GSU Sports Arena (645); Atlanta, GA
11/30/2014*; 12:30 pm		vs. Samford; Georgia State Thanksgiving Tournament consolation	L 56–59 ^{OT}	1–5	GSU Sports Arena (522); Atlanta, GA
12/04/2014*; 7:00 pm		at No. 21 Syracuse; ACC–Big Ten Women's Challenge	L 39–61	1–6	Carrier Dome (258); Syracuse, NY
12/07/2014*; 2:00 pm		Wagner	W 96–66	2–6	Bryce Jordan Center (3,657); University Park, PA
12/10/2014*; 7:00 pm		at Hartford	L 57–62	2–7	Chase Arena (1,467); West Hartford, CT
12/14/2014*; 2:30 pm		Rider	W 85–51	3–7	Bryce Jordan Center (9,991); University Park, PA
12/21/2014*; 2:00 pm		South Florida	L 87–90 ^{OT}	3–8	Bryce Jordan Center (3,429); University Park, PA
Big Ten regular season
12/28/2014; 3:00 pm		at No. 23 Iowa	L 52–77	3–9 (0–1)	Carver–Hawkeye Arena (5,411); Iowa City, IA
01/01/2015; 1:00 pm		at Michigan	L 53–89	3–10 (0–2)	Crisler Center (3,034); Ann Arbor, MI
01/04/2015; 2:00 pm		Illinois	L 76–91	3–11 (0–3)	Bryce Jordan Center (3,933); University Park, PA
01/06/2015; 9:00 pm, BTN		at Wisconsin	L 46–65	3–12 (0–4)	Kohl Center (2,822); Madison, WI
01/10/2015; 12:00 pm, BTN		No. 24 Rutgers	L 51–71	3–13 (0–5)	Bryce Jordan Center (3,705); University Park, PA
01/15/2015; 7:00 pm, BTN		at No. 17 Nebraska	L 45–73	3–14 (0–6)	Pinnacle Bank Arena (5,395); Lincoln, NE
01/18/2015; 2:00 pm		at Ohio State	L 60–69	3–15 (0–7)	Value City Arena (6,346); Columbus, OH
01/22/2015; 7:00 pm		Indiana	W 79–75	4–15 (1–7)	Bryce Jordan Center (3,290); University Park, PA
01/25/2015; 2:00 pm		Northwestern	W 76–75	5–15 (2–7)	Bryce Jordan Center (3,786); University Park, PA
01/28/2015; 8:00 pm		at Minnesota	L 64–75	5–16 (2–8)	Williams Arena (2,738); Minneapolis, MN
02/01/2015; 12:00 pm, BTN		at No. 22 Rutgers	L 65–76	5–17 (2–9)	The RAC (2,931); Piscataway, NJ
02/05/2015; 7:00 pm		No. 5 Maryland	L 62–77	5–18 (2–10)	Bryce Jordan Center (3,809); University Park, PA
02/08/2015; 2:00 pm		at Purdue	W 54–50	6–18 (3–10)	Mackey Arena (6,861); West Lafayette, IN
02/11/2015; 7:00 pm		Michigan State	L 67–74	6–19 (3–11)	Bryce Jordan Center (3,319); University Park, PA
02/15/2015; 2:00 pm		Minnesota	L 77–85	6–20 (3–12)	Bryce Jordan Center (4,462); University Park, PA
02/23/2015; 7:00 pm, BTN		at No. 5 Maryland	L 34–65	6–21 (3–13)	Xfinity Center (6,307); College Park, MD
02/26/2015; 7:00 pm		Ohio State	L 70–88	6–22 (3–14)	Bryce Jordan Center (3,529); University Park, PA
03/01/2015; 2:00 pm		Wisconsin	L 56–62	6–23 (3–15)	Bryce Jordan Center (9,270); University Park, PA
Big Ten Women's Tournament
03/04/2015; 8:30 pm		vs. Indiana; First Round	L 63–68	6–24	Sears Centre (N/A); Hoffman Estates, IL
*Non-conference game. ^{#}Rankings from AP Poll. (#) Tournament seedings in parentheses. All times are in Eastern Time.

== Rankings ==
Ranking movement Legend: ██ Increase in ranking. ██ Decrease in ranking. NR = Not ranked. RV = Received votes.
Poll	Pre	Wk 2	Wk 3	Wk 4	Wk 5	Wk 6	Wk 7	Wk 8	Wk 9	Wk 10	Wk 11	Wk 12	Wk 13	Wk 14	Wk 15	Wk 16	Wk 17	Wk 18	Final
AP	RV	NR	NR	NR	NR	NR	NR	NR	NR	NR	NR	NR	NR	NR	NR	NR	NR	NR	NR
Coaches	RV	RV	NR	NR	NR	NR	NR	NR	NR	NR	NR	NR	NR	NR	NR	NR	NR	NR	NR

== See also ==
2014–15 Penn State Nittany Lions basketball team
