= 2014–15 Southeastern Louisiana Lady Lions basketball team =

Intercollegiate basketball season

2014–15 Southeastern Louisiana Lady Lions basketball
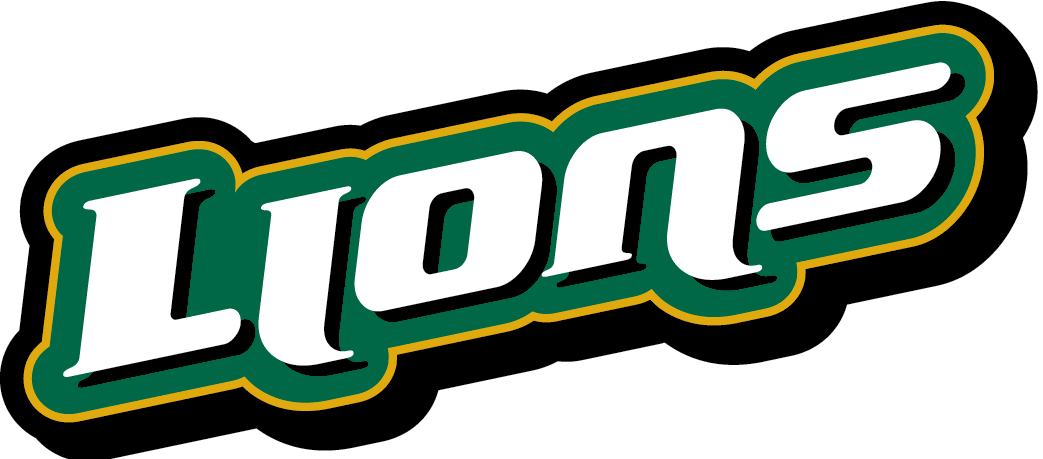
- Conference: Southland Conference
- Record: 7–22 (3–15 Southland)
- Head coach: Yolanda Moore (1st season)
- Assistant coaches: Levar Willis (1st season); Jelani McCaskey (1st season); Travis Ponton (1st season); 1st
- Home arena: University Center (Capacity: 7,500)

2014–15 Southland Conference women's basketball standings
	Conf.				Overall
Team	W		L	PCT	W		L	PCT
Stephen F. Austin***	16	–	2	.889	23	–	8	.742
Lamar	14	–	4	.778	17	–	13	.567
Nicholls State	13	–	5	.722	17	–	13	.567
Texas A&M-CC	12	–	6	.667	16	–	14	.533
McNeese State	11	–	7	.611	18	–	14	.563
Northwestern State†	10	–	8	.556	19	–	15	.559
Central Arkansas	10	–	8	.556	17	–	14	.548
Abilene Christian*	9	–	9	.500	17	–	12	.586
Houston Baptist	6	–	12	.333	15	–	18	.455
New Orleans**	6	–	12	.333	8	–	19	.296
Sam Houston State	5	–	13	.278	6	–	22	.214
SE Louisiana	3	–	15	.167	7	–	22	.241
Incarnate Word*	2	–	16	.111	5	–	24	.172
† 2015 Southland tournament winner As of March 21, 2015; *Ineligible for postseason play due to Div. I transition **Facing level 2 sanctions due to APR penalties ***Southland tournament #1 seed Rankings from AP poll

The 2014–15 Southeastern Louisiana Lady Lions basketball team represented Southeastern Louisiana University during the 2014–15 NCAA Division I women's basketball season. The Lady Lions, led by first-year head coach Yolanda Moore, played their home games at the University Center. They were members of the Southland Conference.

== Roster ==
2014–15 Southeastern Louisiana Lions women's basketball team
Players
Coaches

Pos.	#	Name	Height	Year	Previous school	Hometown
F	0	Gabriella Delaune	6 ft 2 in (1.88 m)	So	St. Mary's Dominican HS; Delago CC	Harahan, LA
G	1	Taylin Underwood	5 ft 7 in (1.7 m)	Fr	Doyle HS	Livingston, LA
G	3	Peaches Anderson	5 ft 8 in (1.73 m)	Jr	Meridian HS; Michigan	Meridian, MS
G	4	Annessa De La Cruz	5 ft 9 in (1.75 m)	Sr	Dr. Michael M. Krop HS; Palm Beach State CC	Los Angeles, CA
G	11	Elizabeth Styles	5 ft 3 in (1.6 m)	Sr	Ridge View HS	Savannah, GA
G	13	Erica Hernandez	5 ft 9 in (1.75 m)	Jr	Floresville HS	Floresville, TX
F	20	Dani Fielder	5 ft 11 in (1.8 m)	So	Cypress Creek HS	Houston, TX
F	22	Chev Stewart	6 ft 1 in (1.85 m)	So	Wylie HS	Wylie, TX
G	23	Jameika Hoskins	5 ft 10 in (1.78 m)	Sr	Aberdeen HS; Itawamba CC	Aberdeen, MS
G	24	Symone Miller	5 ft 4 in (1.63 m)	Sr	East Ascension HS	Gonzales, LA
G	33	Bre Warren	5 ft 8 in (1.73 m)	So	Northshore HS; Milwaukee	Slidell, LA
F	34	Adrina LaVern	5 ft 10 in (1.78 m)	Sr	West Anchorage HS; Kaskaskia College	Anchorage, AK
F	42	Nanna Pool	6 ft 1 in (1.85 m)	Jr	Amite County HS	Magnolia, MS

Head coach

- Yolanda Moore (Mississippi)

Assistant coach(es)

- Levar Willis (West Virginia Tech)
- Jelani McCaskey
- Travis Ponton

Legend

- (C) Team captain
- (S) Suspended
- (I) Ineligible
- (W) Walk-on
- Injured
- Current redshirt

Roster
Last update: 2014-10-18

== Schedule ==
Date time, TV	Opponent	Result	Record	Site (attendance) city, state
Out of conference schedule
11/14/2014*; 7:00 pm	at Minnesota	L 60–109	0–1	Williams Arena (3,879); Minneapolis, MN
11/18/2014*; 7:00 pm	Southern	W 79–76	1–1	University Center (647); Hammond, LA
11/21/2014*; 12:00 pm	at Troy	L 78–80	1–2	Trojan Arena (1,121); Troy, AL
11/25/2014*; 7:00 pm	University of Mobile	W 74–47	2–2	University Center (528); Hammond, LA
11/29/2014*; 2:00 pm	Louisiana–Lafayette	L 60–71	2–3	University Center (325); Hammond, LA
12/02/2014*; 7:00 pm	William Carey University	W 62–35	3–3	University Center (468); Hammond, LA
12/04/2014*; 6:00 pm	at Auburn	L 44–72	3–4	Auburn Arena (1,469); Auburn, AL
12/07/2014*; 2:00 pm	at No. 23 Mississippi State	L 36–97	3–5	Humphrey Coliseum (3,020); Starkville, MS
12/14/2014*; 2:00 pm, SECN+	at LSU	L 42–75	3–6	Pete Maravich Assembly Center (2,511); Baton Rouge, LA
12/20/2014*; 2:00 pm	Florida A&M	W 69–67	4–6	University Center (202); Hammond, LA
12/29/2014*; 6:00 pm	at Mississippi	L 71–79 ^{OT}	4–7	Tad Smith Coliseum (912); Oxford, MS
Southland Conference schedule
01/05/2015; 6:00 pm	at Stephen F. Austin	L 71–78	4–8 (0–1)	William R. Johnson Coliseum (587); Nacogdoches, TX
01/08/2015; 7:00 pm	Sam Houston State	W 78–76	5–8 (1–1)	University Center (316); Hammond, LA
01/10/2015; 7:00 pm	Houston Baptist	W 67–59	6–8 (2–1)	University Center (315); Hammond, LA
01/15/2015; 7:00 pm	at Lamar	L 60–83	6–9 (2–2)	Montagne Center (661); Beaumont, TX
01/17/2015; 2:00 pm	at Incarnate Word	L 70–82	6–10 (2–3)	McDermott Center (818); San Antonio, TX
01/22/2015; 7:00 pm	Texas A&M–Corpus Christi	L 53–74	6–11 (2–4)	University Center (343); Hammond, LA
01/29/2015; 7:00 pm	McNeese State	L 57–78	6–12 (2–5)	University Center (527); Hammond, LA
01/31/2015; 4:30 pm	Northwestern State	W 58–52	7–12 (3–5)	University Center (554); Hammond, LA
02/04/2015; 7:00 pm	Central Arkansas	L 48–60	7–14 (3–7)	University Center (605); Hammond, LA
02/07/2015; 2:00 pm	at Abilene Christian	L 74–75	7–14 (3–7)	Moody Coliseum (765); Abilene, TX
02/12/2015; 7:00 pm	at McNeese State	L 62–66	7–15 (3–8)	Burton Coliseum (951); Lake Charles, LA
02/14/2015; 1:00 pm	at Nicholls State	L 83–90	7–16 (3–9)	Stopher Gym (417); Thibodaux, LA
02/19/2015; 7:00 pm	New Orleans	L 64–76	7–17 (3–10)	University Center (431); Hammond, LA
02/21/2015; 4:30 pm, ESPN3	Abilene Christian	L 65–83	7–18 (3–11)	University Center (530); Hammond, LA
02/26/2015; 6:30 pm	at Northwestern State	L 60–71	7–19 (3–12)	Prather Coliseum (713); Natchitoches, LA
02/28/2015; 2:00 pm	at Central Arkansas	L 57–73	7–20 (3–13)	Farris Center (912); Conway, AR
03/05/2015; 5:30 pm	at New Orleans	L 75–84	7–21 (3–14)	Lakefront Arena (348); New Orleans, LA
03/07/2015; 4:30 pm	Nicholls State	L 74–77	7–22 (3–15)	University Center (478); Hammond, LA
*Non-conference game. ^{#}Rankings from AP Poll. (#) Tournament seedings in parentheses. All times are in Central Time.

== See also ==
- 2014–15 Southeastern Louisiana Lions basketball team
