= 2014–15 New Orleans Privateers women's basketball team =

Intercollegiate basketball season

2014–15 New Orleans Privateers women's basketball
- Conference: Southland Conference
- Record: 8–19 (6–12 Southland)
- Head coach: Keeshawn Davenport (4th season)
- Assistant coaches: Alpha English (4th season); Tomekia Reed (1st season)
- Home arena: Lakefront Arena (Capacity: 10,000)

2014–15 Southland Conference women's basketball standings
	Conf.				Overall
Team	W		L	PCT	W		L	PCT
Stephen F. Austin***	16	–	2	.889	23	–	8	.742
Lamar	14	–	4	.778	17	–	13	.567
Nicholls State	13	–	5	.722	17	–	13	.567
Texas A&M-CC	12	–	6	.667	16	–	14	.533
McNeese State	11	–	7	.611	18	–	14	.563
Northwestern State†	10	–	8	.556	19	–	15	.559
Central Arkansas	10	–	8	.556	17	–	14	.548
Abilene Christian*	9	–	9	.500	17	–	12	.586
Houston Baptist	6	–	12	.333	15	–	18	.455
New Orleans**	6	–	12	.333	8	–	19	.296
Sam Houston State	5	–	13	.278	6	–	22	.214
SE Louisiana	3	–	15	.167	7	–	22	.241
Incarnate Word*	2	–	16	.111	5	–	24	.172
† 2015 Southland tournament winner As of March 21, 2015; *Ineligible for postseason play due to Div. I transition **Facing level 2 sanctions due to APR penalties ***Southland tournament #1 seed Rankings from AP poll

The 2014–15 New Orleans Privateers women's basketball team represented the University of New Orleans during the 2014–15 NCAA Division I women's basketball season. The Privateers, led by fourth-year head coach Keeshawn Davenport, played their home games at Lakefront Arena. They were members of the Southland Conference.

== Roster ==
2014–15 New Orleans Privateers women's basketball team
Players
Coaches

Pos.	#	Name	Height	Year	Previous school	Hometown
F	00	Haile Matthews	6 ft 0 in (1.83 m)	Fr	West Jefferson HS	Harvey, LA
G	1	Jordan Carr	5 ft 7 in (1.7 m)	So	Parkers Chapel HS	Raleigh, NC
G	3	Jewel Angelo	5 ft 11 in (1.8 m)	So	Manvel HS	Manvel, TX
G	4	Ariele Davis	5 ft 8 in (1.73 m)	So	Pineville HS	Alexandria, LA
G	5	Alexis Martin	5 ft 7 in (1.7 m)	So	Loyola Prep HS	Shreveport, LA
G	10	Jazmine Ocanas	5 ft 6 in (1.68 m)	Jr	Elsik HS; Southern-Shreveport	Houston, TX
G	11	Octavia Wilson	5 ft 9 in (1.75 m)	So	Lexington Catholic HS	Nicholasville, KY
F	14	Raven Coleman	6 ft 0 in (1.83 m)	So	John Ehret HS	Marrero, LA
G	20	Dasia Batiste	5 ft 7 in (1.7 m)	So	Episcopal HS	Houston, TX
G	21	Randi Brown	5 ft 7 in (1.7 m)	Fr	Central Catholic HS	Houma, LA
F/C	22	Mathilde Fogelstrom	6 ft 2 in (1.88 m)	Jr	Kent HS; Orestad Gymnasium	Copenhagen, Denmark
G	23	Mariah Wright	5 ft 3 in (1.6 m)	Fr	Zachary HS	Zachary, LA
G	25	Kayla Mundy	5 ft 8 in (1.73 m)	Fr	Liberty HS	McKinney, TX
F	30	BriAnna Shavers	6 ft 0 in (1.83 m)	Fr	Carrollton HS	Carrollton, TX
G	31	Dannisha Jackson	5 ft 10 in (1.78 m)	Sr	Evangel Christian HS; Panola JC	Shreveport, LA
G	32	Danielle Davis	5 ft 8 in (1.73 m)	Jr	Oakton HS; Central Connecticut	Oakton, LA
G	33	Allison Jacks	5 ft 7 in (1.7 m)	Fr	Lumberton HS	Beaumont, TX
F	34	Bria Platenburg	5 ft 10 in (1.78 m)	Jr	Wakeland HS; Texas Women's University	Frisco, TX
F	35	Yasmin Taylor	5 ft 10 in (1.78 m)	Jr	Grace King HS	Metarie, LA

Head coach

Keeshawn Davenport

Assistant coach(es)

Alpha English
Tomekia Reed

Legend

- (C) Team captain
- (S) Suspended
- (I) Ineligible
- (W) Walk-on
- Injured
- Current redshirt

Roster
Last update: 2014-10-10

== Schedule ==
Date time, TV	Rank^{#}	Opponent^{#}	Result	Record	Site (attendance) city, state
Out of conference schedule
11/14/2014*; 5:00 pm		West Alabama	L 54–66	0–1	Human Performance Center (395); New Orleans, LA
11/22/2014*; 2:00 pm		at Jacksonville State	L 51–65	1–1	Pete Mathews Coliseum (541); Anniston, AL
11/29/2014*; 2:00 pm		No. 25 Mississippi State	L 45–85	0–3	Lakefront Arena (284); New Orleans, LA
12/03/2014*; 9:00 pm		at Grand Canyon	L 57–59	0–4	GCU Arena (381); Phoenix, AZ
12/02/2014*; 4:00 pm		Crowley's Ridge	W 87–54	1–4	Lakefront Arena (365); New Orleans, LA
12/15/2014*; 7:00 pm		at No. 19 Oklahoma State	L 33–84	1–5	Gallagher-Iba Arena (1,954); Stillwater, OK
12/18/2014*; 7:00 pm		at Tulsa	L 55–78	1–6	Reynolds Arena (695); Tulsa, OK
12/21/2014*; 2:00 pm, SECN+		at Alabama	L 58–87	1–7	Foster Auditorium (2,365); Tuscaloosa, AL
12/30/2014*; 2:00 pm		Kent State	W 58–55	2–7	Lakefront Arena (309); New Orleans, LA
Southland Conference schedule
01/05/2015; 5:30 pm		Lamar	L 54–64	2–8 (0–1)	Lakefront Arena (309); New Orleans, LA
01/08/2015; 6:00 pm		at Incarnate Word	L 56–71	2–9 (0–2)	McDermott Center (211); San Antonio, TX
01/10/2015; 4:00 pm		Sam Houston State	L 59–75	2–10 (0–3)	Lakefront Arena (347); New Orleans, LA
01/15/2015; 7:00 pm		at Stephen F. Austin	L 56–76	2–11 (0–4)	William R. Johnson Coliseum (279); Nacogdoches, TX
01/17/2015; 4:00 pm		at Houston Baptist	L 45–63	2–12 (0–5)	Sharp Gymnasium (768); Houston, TX
01/21/2015; 7:00 pm		Central Arkansas	L 46–53	2–13 (0–6)	Lakefront Arena (393); New Orleans, LA
01/24/2015; 4:00 pm		Texas A&M–Corpus Christi	L 46–58	2–14 (0–7)	Lakefront Arena (508); New Orleans, LA
01/29/2015; 6:00 pm		at Nicholls State	L 40–56	2–15 (0–8)	Stopher Gym (505); Thibodaux, LA
01/31/2015; 1:00 pm		at McNeese State	L 58–82	2–16 (0–9)	Burton Coliseum (1,823); Lake Charles, LA
02/05/2015; 7:00 pm		McNeese State	W 90–86 ^{3OT}	3–16 (1–9)	Lakefront Arena (302); New Orleans, LA
02/07/2015; 2:00 pm, ESPN3		at Central Arkansas	L 44–50	3–17 (1–10)	Farris Center (795); Conway, AR
02/12/2015; 7:00 pm		at Texas A&M–Corpus Christi	L 52–66	3–18 (1–11)	American Bank Center (645); Corpus Christi, TX
02/19/2015; 7:00 pm		at Southeastern Louisiana	W 76–64	4–18 (2–11)	University Center (431); Hammond, LA
02/21/2015; 4:00 pm		Northwestern State	L 63–75	4–19 (2–12)	Lakefront Arena (309); New Orleans, LA
02/26/2015; 7:00 pm		Nicholls State	W 68–63	5–19 (3–12)	Lakefront Arena (482); New Orleans, LA
02/28/2015; 4:00 pm		Abilene Christian	W 71–50	6–19 (4–12)	Lakefront Arena (309); New Orleans, LA
03/05/2015; 5:30 pm		Southeastern Louisiana	W 84–75	7–19 (5–12)	Lakefront Arena (327); New Orleans, LA
03/07/2015; 1:00 pm		Northwestern State	W 72–70	8–19 (6–12)	Prather Coliseum (1,213); Natchitoches, LA
*Non-conference game. ^{#}Rankings from AP Poll. (#) Tournament seedings in parentheses. All times are in Central Time.

== See also ==
- 2014–15 New Orleans Privateers men's basketball team
