= 2014–15 Abilene Christian Wildcats women's basketball team =

Intercollegiate basketball season

2014–15 Abilene Christian Wildcats women's basketball
- Conference: Southland Conference
- Record: 17–12 (9–9 Southland)
- Head coach: Julie Goodenough (3rd season)
- Assistant coaches: Kendra Hassell (2nd season); Kyle Felan; Matt Stine
- Home arena: Moody Coliseum (Capacity: 4,600)

2014–15 Southland Conference women's basketball standings
	Conf.				Overall
Team	W		L	PCT	W		L	PCT
Stephen F. Austin***	16	–	2	.889	23	–	8	.742
Lamar	14	–	4	.778	17	–	13	.567
Nicholls State	13	–	5	.722	17	–	13	.567
Texas A&M-CC	12	–	6	.667	16	–	14	.533
McNeese State	11	–	7	.611	18	–	14	.563
Northwestern State†	10	–	8	.556	19	–	15	.559
Central Arkansas	10	–	8	.556	17	–	14	.548
Abilene Christian*	9	–	9	.500	17	–	12	.586
Houston Baptist	6	–	12	.333	15	–	18	.455
New Orleans**	6	–	12	.333	8	–	19	.296
Sam Houston State	5	–	13	.278	6	–	22	.214
SE Louisiana	3	–	15	.167	7	–	22	.241
Incarnate Word*	2	–	16	.111	5	–	24	.172
† 2015 Southland tournament winner As of March 21, 2015; *Ineligible for postseason play due to Div. I transition **Facing level 2 sanctions due to APR penalties ***Southland tournament #1 seed Rankings from AP poll

The 2014–15 Abilene Christian Wildcats women's basketball team represented Abilene Christian University during the 2014–15 NCAA Division I women's basketball season. The Wildcats were led by third-year head coach Julie Goodenough and played their home games at the Moody Coliseum. This was the second year of a four-year transition phase from D2 to D1. In the second year of transition, Abilene Christian could not participate in the Southland Tournament, but was a Division I counter and was part of the Division I RPI calculation. The Wildcats played a full conference schedule in 2014–15. Although not eligible for the Southland Conference and NCAA tournament, the Wildcats were able to participate in the WNIT or WBI tournaments if invited.

== Roster ==
2014–15 Abilene Christian Wildcats women's basketball team
Players
Coaches

Pos.	#	Name	Height	Year	Previous school	Hometown
G	2	Alyssa Echols	5 ft 7 in (1.7 m)	Fr	Pflugerville HS	Pflugerville, TX
G	5	Alana Aquirre	5 ft 10 in (1.78 m)	Fr	Frisco Wakeland HS	Frisco, TX
G	10	Paris Webb	5 ft 4 in (1.63 m)	Jr	Midland HS	Midland, TX
G	12	Whitney West	5 ft 7 in (1.7 m)	Jr	Gregory-Portland HS	Portland, TX
G	14	Ellyn Avery	5 ft 10 in (1.78 m)	So	Lenora-Grady HS	Lenora, TX
G	15	Alexis Mason	5 ft 9 in (1.75 m)	So	McKinney North HS	McKinney, TX
C	22	Sierra Allen	6 ft 1 in (1.85 m)	Fr	Roscoe Highland HS	Roscoe, TX
F	23	Suzzy Dimba	5 ft 11 in (1.8 m)	So	Lubbuck Coronado HS	Lubbock, TX
G	24	Katelyn Goodman	5 ft 8 in (1.73 m)	RS Fr	Abilene HS	Abilene, TX
F	32	Lizzy Dimba	5 ft 11 in (1.8 m)	So	Lubbuck Coronado HS	Lubbock, TX
F	33	Sydney Shelstead	6 ft 3 in (1.91 m)	So	Mineral Wells HS	Mineral Wells, TX
C	42	Madison Parker	5 ft 10 in (1.78 m)	Fr	Canyon HS	Amarillo, TX

Head coach

- Julie Goodenough (Abilene Christian)

Assistant coach(es)

- Kendra Hassell
- Kyle Felan (Texas A&M)
- Matt Stine (Dayton)

Legend

- (C) Team captain
- (S) Suspended
- (I) Ineligible
- (W) Walk-on
- Injured
- Current redshirt

Roster
Last update: 2014-10-01

== Schedule ==
Date time, TV	Opponent	Result	Record	Site (attendance) city, state
Out of conference schedule
11/15/2014*; 5:00 pm	Wayland Baptist	W 91–64	1–0	Moody Coliseum (725); Abilene, TX
11/17/2014*; 7:00 pm	Howard Payne	W 102–60	2–0	Moody Coliseum (717); Abilene, TX
11/19/2014*; 7:00 pm	at UTSA	L 57–70	2–1	Convocation Center (410); San Antonio, TX
11/24/2014*; 7:00 pm	Eastern Washington	W 79–72	3–1	Moody Coliseum (724); Abilene, TX
11/28/2014*; 3:30 pm	vs. George Mason; Plaza Lights Classic	W 88–86	4–1	Swinney Recreation Center (597); Kansas City, MO
11/29/2014*; 3:30 pm	at UMKC; Plaza Lights Classic	W 80–55	5–1	Swinney Recreation Center (247); Kansas City, MO
12/03/2014*; 11:00 am	at Texas Tech	L 44–61	5–2	United Spirit Arena (6,477); Lubbock, TX
12/15/2014*; 7:00 pm	Southwestern Christian College	W 100–52	6–2	Moody Coliseum (873); Abilene, TX
12/20/2014*; 1:00 pm	Air Force	W 80–44	7–2	Moody Coliseum (1,720); Abilene, TX
12/22/2014*; 7:00 pm	at Kansas State	L 53–68	7–3	Bramlage Coliseum (3,834); Manhattan, KS
Southland Conference schedule
01/04/2015; 1:00 pm	Central Arkansas	L 60–66	7–4 (0–1)	Moody Coliseum (604); Abilene, TX
01/07/2015; 6:30 pm	at Northwestern State	L 56–61	7–5 (0–2)	Prather Coliseum (413); Natchitoches, LA
01/11/2015; 2:00 pm	Nicholls State	L 39–63	7–6 (0–3)	Moody Coliseum (540); Abilene, TX
01/14/2015; 7:00 pm	at McNeese State	W 75–59	8–6 (1–3)	Burton Coliseum (1,032); Lake Charles, LA
01/17/2015; 2:00 pm	Stephen F. Austin	L 69–71 ^{OT}	8–7 (1–4)	Moody Coliseum (1,232); Abilene, TX
01/22/2015; 7:00 pm	Sam Houston State	L 58–63	8–8 (1–5)	Moody Coliseum (875); Abilene, TX
01/24/2015; 2:00 pm	Incarnate Word	W 78–54	9–8 (2–5)	Moody Coliseum (1,125); Abilene, TX
01/26/2015*; 5:00 pm	Angelo State	W 70–55	10–8	Moody Coliseum (742); Abilene, TX
01/29/2015; 7:00 pm	at Houston Baptist	W 53–50	11–8 (3–5)	Sharp Gym (489); Houston, TX
01/31/2015; 4:00 pm	at Lamar	L 72–76	11–9 (3–6)	Montagne Center (943); Beaumont, TX
02/05/2015; 7:00 pm	Lamar	L 58–73	11–10 (3–7)	Moody Coliseum (675); Abilene, TX
02/07/2015; 2:00 pm	Southeastern Louisiana	W 75–74	12–10 (4–7)	Moody Coliseum (765); Abilene, TX
02/12/2015; 6:30 pm	at Sam Houston State	W 63–48	13–10 (5–7)	Bernard Johnson Coliseum (903); Huntsville, TX
02/18/2015; 7:00 pm	Texas A&M–Corpus Christi	W 76–41	14–10 (6–7)	Moody Coliseum (1,128); Abilene, TX
02/21/2015; 4:30 pm, ESPN3	at Southeastern Louisiana	W 83–65	15–10 (7–7)	University Center (530); Abilene, TX
02/25/2015; 7:00 pm	Houston Baptist	W 68–53	16–10 (8–7)	Moody Coliseum (1,025); Abilene, TX
02/28/2015; 4:00 pm	at New Orleans	L 50–71	16–11 (8–8)	Lakefront Arena (309); New Orleans, LA
03/05/2015; 6:00 pm	at Incarnate Word	W 72–62	17–11 (9–8)	McDermott Center (1,021); San Antonio, TX
03/07/2015; 1:00 pm	at Texas A&M–Corpus Christi	L 40–60	17–12 (9–9)	American Bank Center (N/A); Corpus Christi, TX
*Non-conference game. ^{#}Rankings from AP Poll. (#) Tournament seedings in parentheses. All times are in Central Time.

== See also ==
- 2014–15 Abilene Christian Wildcats men's basketball team
