= 2014–15 Nicholls State Colonels women's basketball team =

Intercollegiate basketball season

2014–15 Nicholls State Colonels women's basketball
- Conference: Southland Conference
- Record: 17–13 (13–5 Southland)
- Head coach: DoBee Plaisance (7th season)
- Assistant coaches: Justin Payne (4th season); Kris Goff (1st season)
- Home arena: Stopher Gym (capacity: 3,800)

2014–15 Southland Conference women's basketball standings
	Conf.				Overall
Team	W		L	PCT	W		L	PCT
Stephen F. Austin***	16	–	2	.889	23	–	8	.742
Lamar	14	–	4	.778	17	–	13	.567
Nicholls State	13	–	5	.722	17	–	13	.567
Texas A&M-CC	12	–	6	.667	16	–	14	.533
McNeese State	11	–	7	.611	18	–	14	.563
Northwestern State†	10	–	8	.556	19	–	15	.559
Central Arkansas	10	–	8	.556	17	–	14	.548
Abilene Christian*	9	–	9	.500	17	–	12	.586
Houston Baptist	6	–	12	.333	15	–	18	.455
New Orleans**	6	–	12	.333	8	–	19	.296
Sam Houston State	5	–	13	.278	6	–	22	.214
SE Louisiana	3	–	15	.167	7	–	22	.241
Incarnate Word*	2	–	16	.111	5	–	24	.172
† 2015 Southland tournament winner As of March 21, 2015; *Ineligible for postseason play due to Div. I transition **Facing level 2 sanctions due to APR penalties ***Southland tournament #1 seed Rankings from AP poll

The 2014–15 Nicholls State Colonels women's basketball team represented Nicholls State University during the 2014–15 NCAA Division I women's basketball season. The Colonels, led by seventh-year head coach DoBee Plaisance, played their home games at Stopher Gym and were members of the Southland Conference. The team's overall record was 17–13, including one game as the #3 seed in the 2015 Southland Conference women's basketball tournament. In conference play, the Colonels had a 13–5 record third place.

== Roster ==
2014–15 Nicholls State Colonels women's basketball team
Players
Coaches

Pos.	#	Name	Height	Year	Previous school	Hometown
G	0	Emani White	5 ft 4 in (1.63 m)	Jr	Archbishop Chapelle HS	New Orleans, LA
C	1	Jovana Mandic	6 ft 4 in (1.93 m)	Jr	The Rock School; North Carolina-Wilmington	Knin, Croatiana
C	2	Shay Amick	6 ft 2 in (1.88 m)	Sr	Carter HS; Northeast Oklahoma A&M	Dallas, TX
F	3	Elexus Allen	6 ft 1 in (1.85 m)	So	John Paul Stevens HS	San Antonio, TX
G	5	Hope Pawlowski	5 ft 7 in (1.7 m)	Jr	Orlando Christian Preparatory	Orlando, FL
G	12	Jenny Nash	5 ft 10 in (1.78 m)	Sr	Cypress Woods HS	Houston, TX
G	15	Tia Charles	5 ft 6 in (1.68 m)	Fr	John Curtis HS	New Orleans, LA
F	21	Syleida Davis	5 ft 9 in (1.75 m)	Jr	C.E. Bird HS	Shreveport, LA
F	22	Ekiya Gray	6 ft 1 in (1.85 m)	Fr	Klein Forest HS	Houston, TX
G	23	Veronica Ryan	5 ft 7 in (1.7 m)	Jr	Westpoint HS; Palm Beach State	Clearwater, FL
G	24	Taylor Morrison	5 ft 8 in (1.73 m)	So	St. Michael HS	Baton Roughe, LA
F	32	LiAnn McCarthy	5 ft 11 in (1.8 m)	RS Sr	Ursuline Academy HS	New Orleans, LA
C	40	Marina Lilly	6 ft 3 in (1.91 m)	So	Skyline HS	Dallas, TX
C	55	JonMarie Guillory	6 ft 1 in (1.85 m)	Sr	St. Louis Catholic HS	Lake Charles, LA

Head coach

DoBee Plaisance

Assistant coach(es)

Justin Payne
Kris Goff

Legend

- (C) Team captain
- (S) Suspended
- (I) Ineligible
- (W) Walk-on
- Injured
- Current redshirt

Roster
Last update: 2014-10-10

== Schedule ==
Date time, TV	Opponent	Result	Record	Site (attendance) city, state
Out of conference schedule
11/14/2014*; 11:00 am	at Arkansas	L 52–63	0–1	Bud Walton Arena (4,541); Fayetteville, AR
11/17/2014*; 6:00 pm	SUNO	W 87–84	1–1	Stopher Gym (501); Thibodaux, LA
11/21/2014*; 5:00 pm	LSU–Alexandria			Stopher Gym (-); Thibodaux, LA
11/29/2014*; 1:00 pm	at vs. Youngstown State; Teresa Phillips Thanksgiving Classic	L 50–51	1–2	Gentry Complex (321); Nashville, TN
11/30/2014*; 12:00 pm	at vs. Norfolk State; Teresa Phillips Thanksgiving Classic	W 69–64	2–2	Gentry Complex (273); Nashville, TN
12/03/2014*; 7:00 pm	at Tulane	L 44–77	2–3	Devlin Fieldhouse (843); New Orleans, LA
12/06/2014*; 1:00 pm	South Alabama	W 66–62	3–3	Stopher Gym (602); Thibodaux, LA
12/15/2014*; TBA	at Louisiana Tech	L 62–80	3–4	Thomas Assembly Center (2,215); Ruston, LA
12/19/2014*; 5:30 pm	at Texas Tech; Athletes in Action Tournament	L 49–76	3–5	United Spirit Arena (3,958); Lubbock, TX
12/20/2014*; 12:00 pm	vs. Houston; Athletes in Action Tournament	L 47–65	3–6	United Spirit Arena; Lubbock, TX
12/21/2014*; 11:00 am	vs. UTSA; Athletes in Action Tournament	W 57–49	4–6	United Spirit Arena; Lubbock, TX
12/29/2014*; 6:00 pm	Southern Miss	L 57–89	4–7	Stopher Gym (501); Thibodaux, LA
Southland Conference schedule
01/03/2015; 4:00 pm	at Lamar	L 62–69	4–8 (0–1)	Montagne Center (744); Beaumont, TX
01/08/2015; 6:00 pm	Houston Baptist	W 70–58	5–8 (1–1)	Stopher Gym (334); Thibodaux, LA
01/11/2015; 2:00 pm	at Abilene Christian	W 63–39	6–8 (2–1)	Moody Coliseum (540); Abilene, TX
01/15/2015; 6:00 pm	Sam Houston State	W 67–64	7–8 (3–1)	Stopher Gym (407); Thibodaux, LA
01/17/2015; 1:00 pm	Texas A&M–Corpus Christi	L 59–75	7–9 (3–2)	Stopher Gym (317); Thibodaux, LA
01/21/2015; 6:30 pm	at Northwestern State	L 71–74	7–10 (3–3)	Prather Coliseum (738); Natchitoches, LA
01/24/2015; 2:00 pm	at Central Arkansas	W 75–72 ^{OT}	8–10 (4–3)	Farris Center (1,178); Conway, AR
01/29/2015; 6:00 pm	New Orleans	W 56–40	9–10 (5–3)	Stopher Gym (505); Thibodaux, LA
01/31/2015; 1:00 pm	Incarnate Word	W 67–34	10–10 (6–3)	Stopher Gym (404); Thibodaux, LA
02/04/2015; 6:00 pm	at Incarnate Word	W 69–58	11–10 (7–3)	McDermott Center (566); San Antonio, TX
02/07/2015; 1:00 pm	McNeese State	W 70–59	12–10 (8–3)	Stopher Gym (623); Thibodaux, LA
02/14/2015; 1:00 pm	Southeastern Louisiana	W 90–83	13–10 (9–3)	Stopher Gym (417); Thibodaux, LA
02/18/2015; 6:00 pm	Northwestern State	W 59–40	14–10 (10–3)	Stopher Gym (617); Thibodaux, LA
02/21/2015; 4:00 pm	at Stephen F. Austin	L 59–68	14–11 (10–4)	William R. Johnson Coliseum (648); Nacogdoches, TX
02/26/2015; 7:00 pm	at New Orleans	L 63–68	14–12 (10–5)	Lakefront Arena (482); New Orleans, LA
02/28/2015; 12:15 pm, ESPN3	at McNeese State	W 73–68	15–12 (11–5)	Burton Coliseum (1,418); Lake Charles, LA
03/05/2015; 5:00 pm	Central Arkansas	W 53–43	16–12 (12–5)	Stopher Gym (345); Thibodaux, LA
03/07/2015; 4:30 pm	at Southeastern Louisiana	W 77–74	17–12 (13–5)	University Center (478); Hammond, LA
Southland Conference tournament
03/13/2015; 1:30 pm	vs. Northwestern State	L 67–84	17–13	Merrell Center (860); Katy, TX
*Non-conference game. ^{#}Rankings from AP Poll. (#) Tournament seedings in parentheses. All times are in Central Time.

== See also ==
- 2014–15 Nicholls State Colonels men's basketball team
