= 2014–15 Houston Baptist Huskies women's basketball team =

Intercollegiate basketball season

2014–15 Houston Baptist Huskies women's basketball
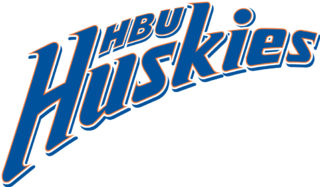
- Conference: Southland Conference
- Record: 15–18 (6–12 Southland)
- Head coach: Donna Finnie (2nd season)
- Assistant coaches: Ben Chase (2nd season); Lauren Tippert (2nd season); Becca Allison (1st season)
- Home arena: Sharp Gymnasium (Capacity: 1,500)

2014–15 Southland Conference women's basketball standings
	Conf.				Overall
Team	W		L	PCT	W		L	PCT
Stephen F. Austin***	16	–	2	.889	23	–	8	.742
Lamar	14	–	4	.778	17	–	13	.567
Nicholls State	13	–	5	.722	17	–	13	.567
Texas A&M-CC	12	–	6	.667	16	–	14	.533
McNeese State	11	–	7	.611	18	–	14	.563
Northwestern State†	10	–	8	.556	19	–	15	.559
Central Arkansas	10	–	8	.556	17	–	14	.548
Abilene Christian*	9	–	9	.500	17	–	12	.586
Houston Baptist	6	–	12	.333	15	–	18	.455
New Orleans**	6	–	12	.333	8	–	19	.296
Sam Houston State	5	–	13	.278	6	–	22	.214
SE Louisiana	3	–	15	.167	7	–	22	.241
Incarnate Word*	2	–	16	.111	5	–	24	.172
† 2015 Southland tournament winner As of March 21, 2015; *Ineligible for postseason play due to Div. I transition **Facing level 2 sanctions due to APR penalties ***Southland tournament #1 seed Rankings from AP poll

The 2014–15 Houston Baptist Huskies women's basketball team represented Houston Baptist University (HBU) in the 2014–15 NCAA Division I women's basketball season season. This was head coach Donna Finnie's second season as head coach at HBU. The Huskies played their home games at the Sharp Gymnasium in Houston, Texas and were members of the Southland Conference.

== Media ==
All Houston Baptist games were broadcast online live by Legacy Sports Network (LSN) with audio for all road games and video for all home games.

== Roster ==
2014–15 Houston Baptist Huskies women's basketball team
Players
Coaches

Pos.	#	Name	Height	Year	Previous school	Hometown
G	3	Heidi Sihvola	5 ft 8 in (1.73 m)	So	Makelanrinne	Helsinki, Finland
G	5	Lisa Zderadicka	5 ft 6 in (1.68 m)	Fr	HAK Korneuburg	Vienna, Austria
G	11	Tayler Jefferson	5 ft 4 in (1.63 m)	Sr	North Shore	Houston, TX
F	12	Caro Lloyd	6 ft 4 in (1.93 m)	Fr	The Kings Hospital	Dublin, Ireland
G	13	Emely Lopez	5 ft 8 in (1.73 m)	So	Westbury	Houston, TX
F	14	Erin McGarrachan	6 ft 0 in (1.83 m)	Sr	St. Maurice's; UTEP	Cumbernauld, Scotland
F	20	Shanice Steenholdt	6 ft 0 in (1.83 m)	Sr	Roswell	Roswell, NM
G	21	Rachel Arthur	5 ft 7 in (1.7 m)	Jr	Atascocita	Humble, TX
F	23	Anna Strickland	6 ft 1 in (1.85 m)	Jr	The Woodlands; Harding	The Woodlands, TX
G	24	Meghan Shank	5 ft 8 in (1.73 m)	Jr	Ventura	Ventura, CA
F	25	Monet Neal	5 ft 10 in (1.78 m)	Jr	William Howard Taft	San Antonio, TX
F	30	Carissa Diaz	6 ft 2 in (1.88 m)	Fr	Tomball	Tomball, TX
G	33	Maisie Elston	5 ft 10 in (1.78 m)	Sr	Barking Abbey	Rochford, England
G	35	Ekemini Essien	5 ft 9 in (1.75 m)	Jr	Dallas Lutheran	Carrollton, TX
F	42	Ashleigh Nwanguma	6 ft 1 in (1.85 m)	Jr	Cinco Ranch	Katy, TX

Head coach

- Donna Finnie (Heriot–Watt)

Assistant coach(es)

- Ben Chase (Emerson)
- Lauren Tippet (Sam Houston State)
- Becca Allison (Old Dominion)

Legend

- (C) Team captain
- (S) Suspended
- (I) Ineligible
- (W) Walk-on
- Injured
- Current redshirt

Roster
Last update: March 30, 2025

== Schedule and results ==
Date time, TV	Rank^{#}	Opponent^{#}	Result	Record	Site (attendance) city, state
Non-conference schedule
November 14, 2014*; 2:00 p.m.		at TCU	L 67–84	0–1	Daniel–Meyer Coliseum (1,344); Fort Worth, TX
November 16, 2014*; 3:00 p.m.		at Texas–Arlington	L 73–83	0–2	College Park Center (1,263); Arlington, TX
November 22, 2014*; 2:00 p.m.		at Texas State	W 61–56	1–2	Strahan Coliseum (1,166); San Marcos, TX
November 25, 2014*; 6:30 p.m.		Southwestern Assemblies of God	W 85–57	2–2	Sharp Gymnasium (620); Houston, TX
November 29, 2014*; 2:00 p.m.		at Texas–Pan American	L 72–75	2–3	UTPA Fieldhouse (342); Edinburg, TX
December 6, 2014*; 3:00 p.m.		at UTEP	W 88–77	3–3	Don Haskins Center (1,309); El Paso, TX
December 13, 2014*; 4:00 p.m.		Arlington Baptist College	W 92–62	4–3	Sharp Gymnasium (407); Houston, TX
December 17, 2014*; 6:00 p.m.		Texas Southern	L 80–92	4–4	Sharp Gymnasium (483); Houston, TX
December 19, 2014*; 6:00 p.m.		McMurry	W 69–49	5–4	Sharp Gymnasium (149); Houston, TX
December 28, 2014*; 2:00 p.m.		Huston–Tillotson	W 86–36	6–4	Sharp Gymnasium (150); Houston, TX
December 30, 2014*; 7:00 p.m., FSN/FCS		at Texas Tech	L 59–60	6–5	United Spirit Arena (2,249); Lubbock, TX
Southland Conference schedule
January 2, 2015; 3:00 p.m.		Northwestern State	L 68–78	6–6 (0–1)	Sharp Gymnasium (305); Houston, TX
January 5, 2015; 5:30 p.m.		at McNeese State	L 57–60	6–7 (0–2)	Burton Coliseum (977); Lake Charles, LA
January 8, 2015; 6:00 p.m.		at Nicholls State	L 58–70	6–8 (0–3)	Stopher Gym (334); Thibodaux, LA
January 10, 2015; 4:30 p.m.		at Southeastern Louisiana	L 59–67	6–9 (0–4)	Southeastern Louisiana (315); Hammond, LA
January 15, 2015; 7:00 p.m.		Central Arkansas	W 58–37	7–9 (1–4)	Sharp Gymnasium (670); Houston, TX
January 17/205; 4:00 p.m.		New Orleans	W 63–45	8–9 (2–4)	Sharp Gymnasium (768); Houston, TX
January 24, 2015; 4:00 p.m.		Lamar	L 64–80	8–10 (2–5)	Sharp Gymnasium (722); Houston, TX
January 29, 2015; 7:00 p.m.		Abilene Christian	L 50–53	8–11 (2–6)	Sharp Gymnasium (489); Houston, TX
January 31, 2015; 1:30 p.m., ESPN3		at Sam Houston State	L 67–74	8–12 (2–7)	Bernard Johnson Coliseum (807); Huntsville, TX
February 5, 2015; 7:00 p.m.		Texas A&M–Corpus Christi	W 59–54	9–12 (3–7)	Sharp Gymnasium (590); Houston, TX
February 7, 2015; 4:00 p.m.		at Stephen F. Austin	L 67–72	9–13 (3–8)	William R. Johnson Coliseum (1,481); Nacogdoches, TX
February 12, 2015; 7:00 p.m.		at Lamar	L 62–79	9–14 (3–9)	Montagne Center (765); Beaumont, TX
February 14, 2015; 4:00 p.m.		Sam Houston State; Play for Kay	W 66–61	10–14 (4–9)	Sharp Gymnasium (680); Houston, TX
February 19, 2015; 7:00 p.m.		Incarnate Word	W 67–64	11–14 (5–9)	Sharp Gymnasium (223); Houston, TX
February 25, 2015; 7:00 p.m.		at Abilene Christian	L 53–68	11–15 (5–10)	Moody Coliseum (1,025); Abilene, TX
February 28, 2015; 4:00 p.m.		Stephen F. Austin	L 57–69	11–16 (5–11)	Sharp Gymnasium (820); Houston, TX
March 5, 2015; 5:00 p.m.		at Texas A&M–Corpus Christi	L 48–73	11–17 (5–12)	American Bank Center (N/A); Corpus Christi, TX
March 7, 2015; 2:00 p.m.		at Incarnate Word	W 81–71	12–17 (6–12)	McDermott Convocation Center (216); San Antonio, TX
Southland Conference tournament
March 12, 2015; 11:00 a.m.	(8)	vs. (5) McNeese State; First round	W 70–68	13–17	Merrell Center (N/A); Katy, TX
March 13, 2015; 11:00 a.m.	(8)	vs. (4) Texas A&M–Corpus Christi; Quarterfinals	W 49–48	14–17	Merrell Center (N/A); Katy, TX
March 14, 2015; 1:00 p.m., ESPN3	(8)	vs. (1) Stephen F. Austin; Semifinals	W 88–81	15–17	Merrell Center (N/A); Katy, TX
March 15, 2015; 12:00 p.m., CBSSN	(8)	vs. (6) Northwestern State; Championship	L 50–58	15–18	Merrell Center (968); Katy, TX
*Non-conference game. ^{#}Rankings from AP poll. (#) Tournament seedings in parentheses. All times are in Central.

== See also ==
- 2014–15 Houston Baptist Huskies men's basketball team
