= 2014–15 McNeese State Cowgirls basketball team =

Intercollegiate basketball season

2014–15 McNeese State Cowgirls basketball

2015 Women's Basketball Invitational, Quarterfinals
- Conference: Southland Conference
- Record: 18–14 (11–7 Southland)
- Head coach: Brooks Donald-Williams (8th season)
- Assistant coaches: Kacie Cryer (4th season); Benjamin Law (2nd season); Tyria Snow (2nd season)
- Home arena: Burton Coliseum (Capacity: 8,000)

2014–15 Southland Conference women's basketball standings
	Conf.				Overall
Team	W		L	PCT	W		L	PCT
Stephen F. Austin***	16	–	2	.889	23	–	8	.742
Lamar	14	–	4	.778	17	–	13	.567
Nicholls State	13	–	5	.722	17	–	13	.567
Texas A&M-CC	12	–	6	.667	16	–	14	.533
McNeese State	11	–	7	.611	18	–	14	.563
Northwestern State†	10	–	8	.556	19	–	15	.559
Central Arkansas	10	–	8	.556	17	–	14	.548
Abilene Christian*	9	–	9	.500	17	–	12	.586
Houston Baptist	6	–	12	.333	15	–	18	.455
New Orleans**	6	–	12	.333	8	–	19	.296
Sam Houston State	5	–	13	.278	6	–	22	.214
SE Louisiana	3	–	15	.167	7	–	22	.241
Incarnate Word*	2	–	16	.111	5	–	24	.172
† 2015 Southland tournament winner As of March 21, 2015; *Ineligible for postseason play due to Div. I transition **Facing level 2 sanctions due to APR penalties ***Southland tournament #1 seed Rankings from AP poll

The 2014–15 McNeese State Cowgirls basketball team represented McNeese State University during the 2014–15 NCAA Division I women's basketball season. The Cowgirls, led by eighth year head coach Brooks Donald-Williams, played all their home games at Burton Coliseum. They are members of the Southland Conference. The team completed the 2014–15 season with an 18–14 overall record and an 11–7 Southland Conference record. The Cowgirls, seeded fifth in the 2015 Southland Conference Tournament, fell to eighth seed Houston Baptist 68–70 in the first round of the Southland Conference tournament. They received an invitation to the 2015 Women's Basketball Invitational tournament. In first round play, the Cowgirls defeated the Furman Paladins. The 2014–15 season ended when the team fell to the Louisiana–Lafayette Ragin' Cajuns in the second round of the tournament.

== Roster ==
2014–15 McNeese State Cowgirls women's basketball team
Players
Coaches

Pos.	#	Name	Height	Year	Previous school	Hometown
G	00	Keara Hudnall	6 ft 0 in (1.83 m)	Fr	Pearland HS	Pearland, TX
G	1	Allison Baggett	5 ft 9 in (1.75 m)	Jr	Iota HS	Iota, LA
F	3	Jayin Johnson	5 ft 5 in (1.65 m)	Jr	Jennings HS	Jennings, LA
G	4	Dede Sheppard	5 ft 8 in (1.73 m)	Fr	North Caddo HS	Vivian, LA
F	5	Jasmyn Carswell	6 ft 0 in (1.83 m)	Fr	Airline HS	Bossier, LA
G	12	Alaina Verdin	5 ft 9 in (1.75 m)	Sr	Terrebonne HS	Houma, LA
F	14	Jerica Bolin	6 ft 3 in (1.91 m)	Fr	Ozen HS	Beaumont, TX
G	15	Gabby Guidry	5 ft 6 in (1.68 m)	Fr	Lake Arthur HS	Lake Arthur, LA
F	21	Mercedes Rogers	6 ft 0 in (1.83 m)	Fr	Crowley HS	Crowley, LA
G	22	Hannah Cupit	5 ft 8 in (1.73 m)	So	Sulphur HS	Sulphur, LA
G	23	Amber Donnes	5 ft 9 in (1.75 m)	So	St. Thomas Aquinas HS	Hammond, LA
G	24	Haily Jenkins	5 ft 9 in (1.75 m)	So	Martins Mill HS	Ben Wheeler, TX
F	25	Frederica Haywood	6 ft 1 in (1.85 m)	Fr	JFK HS	Mound Bayou, MS
G	33	Victoria Rachal	5 ft 7 in (1.7 m)	So	Natchitoches Central HS	Natchitoches, LA
F	34	Talisa Boyd	6 ft 0 in (1.83 m)	Sr	Natchitoches Central HS; NE Mississippi	Natchitoches, LA
F	44	Ann Nwosah	6 ft 0 in (1.83 m)	Fr	Lamar Consolidated HS	Houston, TX

Head coach

Brooks Donald-Williams

Assistant coach(es)

Kacie Cryer
Benjamin Law
Tyria Snow

Legend

- (C) Team captain
- (S) Suspended
- (I) Ineligible
- (W) Walk-on
- Injured
- Current redshirt

Roster
Last update: 2014-10-08

== Schedule ==
Date time, TV	Rank^{#}	Opponent^{#}	Result	Record	Site (attendance) city, state
Out of Conference Schedule
11/14/2014*; 7:00 pm		Louisiana College	W 83–61	1–0	Burton Coliseum (476); Lake Charles, LA
11/16/2014*; 2:00 pm		Tulane	L 55–75	1–1	Burton Coliseum (384); Lake Charles, LA
11/20/2014*; 7:00 pm		LSU–Alexandria	W 79–70	2–1	Burton Coliseum (537); Lake Charles, LA
11/23/2014*; 2:00 pm		Southern Miss	W 57–55	3–1	Burton Coliseum (589); Lake Charles, LA
11/26/2014*; 7:00 pm, SECN+		at Texas A&M	L 27–93	3–2	Reed Arena (4,073); College Station, TX
12/03/2014*; 6:00 pm		Wiley College	W 67–66	4–2	Burton Coliseum (324); Lake Charles, LA
12/10/2014*; 7:00 pm		Centenary	W 86–35	5–2	Burton Coliseum (334); Lake Charles, LA
12/13/2014*; 2:00 pm		at Louisiana–Monroe	L 63–66	5–3	Fant–Ewing Coliseum (783); Monroe, LA
12/17/2014*; 7:00 pm, LHN		at Texas	L 59–76	5–4	Frank Erwin Center (2,408); Austin, TX
12/19/2014*; 6:00 pm		at Rice	L 55–57 ^{OT}	5–5	Tudor Fieldhouse (220); Houston, TX
12/29/2014*; 7:00 pm		Texas Southern	W 74–70	6–5	Burton Coliseum (433); Lake Charles, LA
Southland Conference Schedule
01/03/2015; 1:00 pm		Stephen F. Austin	W 73–67	7–5 (1–0)	Burton Coliseum (1,046); Lake Charles, LA
01/05/2015; 5:30 pm		Houston Baptist	W 60–57	8–5 (2–0)	Burton Coliseum (977); Lake Charles, LA
01/10/2015; 4:30 pm		at Texas A&M–Corpus Christi	L 65–76	8–6 (2–1)	Dugan Wellness Center (839); Corpus Christi, TX
01/14/2015; 7:00 pm		Abilene Christian	L 59–75	8–7 (2–2)	Burton Coliseum (1,032); Lake Charles, LA
01/17/2015; 2:00 pm		at Sam Houston State	W 79–74	9–7 (3–2)	Bernard Johnson Coliseum (477); Huntsville, TX
01/22/2015; 6:00 pm		at Incarnate Word	W 104–101 ^{2OT}	10–7 (4–2)	McDermott Center (286); San Antonio, TX
01/24/2015; 1:00 pm		at Northwestern State	L 54–75	10–8 (4–3)	Prather Coliseum (1,912); Natchitoches, LA
01/29/2015; 7:00 pm		at Southeastern Louisiana	W 78–57	11–8 (5–3)	University Center (527); Hammond, LA
01/31/2015; 7:00 pm		New Orleans	W 82–58	12–8 (6–3)	Burton Coliseum (1,823); Lake Charles, LA
02/05/2015; 7:00 pm		at New Orleans	L 86–90 ^{3OT}	12–9 (6–4)	Lakefront Arena (302); New Orleans, LA
02/07/2015; 1:00 pm		at Nicholls State	L 59–70	12–10 (6–5)	Stopher Gym (623); Thibodaux, LA
02/12/2015; 7:00 pm		Southeastern Louisiana	W 66–62	13–10 (7–5)	Burton Coliseum (951); Lake Charles, LA
02/14/2015; 1:00 pm		Northwestern State	W 68–57	14–10 (8–5)	Burton Coliseum (1,079); Lake Charles, LA
02/18/2015; 7:00 pm		at Central Arkansas	W 65–53	15–10 (9–5)	Farris Center (687); Conway, AR
02/21/2015; 4:00 pm		at Lamar	L 67–75	15–11 (9–6)	Montagne Center (997); Beaumont, TX
02/26/2015; 7:00 pm		Lamar	W 98–77	16–11 (10–6)	Burton Coliseum (1,002); Lake Charles, LA
02/28/2015; 12:15 pm, ESPN3		Nicholls State	L 68–73	16–12 (10–7)	Burton Coliseum (1,418); Lake Charles, LA
03/07/2015; 11:00 am		Central Arkansas	W 72–68	17–12 (11–7)	Burton Coliseum (1,005); Lake Charles, LA
Southland Conference Tournament
03/12/2015; 11:00 am	(5)	vs. (8) Houston Baptist; First round	L 68–70	17–13	Leonard E. Merrell Center (N/A); Katy, TX
2015 Women's Basketball Invitational
03/19/2015; 7:00 pm	(6W)	(3W) Furman; First Round	W 87–70	18–13	Lake Charles Civic Center (630); Lake Charles, LA
03/21/2015; 7:00 pm	(6W)	(2W) Louisiana–Lafayette; Quarterfinals	L 58–63	18–14	CajunDome (1,169); Lafayette, LA
*Non-conference game. ^{#}Rankings from AP Poll. (#) Tournament seedings in parentheses. All times are in Central Time.

== See also ==
- 2014–15 McNeese State Cowboys basketball team
