= 2014–15 Stephen F. Austin Ladyjacks basketball team =

Intercollegiate basketball season

2014–15 Stephen F. Austin Ladyjacks basketball

Southland Regular Season Champions

2015 Women's National Invitation Tournament, 1st round
- Conference: Southland Conference
- Record: 23–8 (16–2 Southland)
- Head coach: Brandon Schneider (5th season)
- Assistant coaches: Andy Majors (5th season); Jodi Greve (5th season); Jamila Ganter (2nd season)
- Home arena: William R. Johnson Coliseum (Capacity: 7,203)

2014–15 Southland Conference women's basketball standings
	Conf.				Overall
Team	W		L	PCT	W		L	PCT
Stephen F. Austin***	16	–	2	.889	23	–	8	.742
Lamar	14	–	4	.778	17	–	13	.567
Nicholls State	13	–	5	.722	17	–	13	.567
Texas A&M-CC	12	–	6	.667	16	–	14	.533
McNeese State	11	–	7	.611	18	–	14	.563
Northwestern State†	10	–	8	.556	19	–	15	.559
Central Arkansas	10	–	8	.556	17	–	14	.548
Abilene Christian*	9	–	9	.500	17	–	12	.586
Houston Baptist	6	–	12	.333	15	–	18	.455
New Orleans**	6	–	12	.333	8	–	19	.296
Sam Houston State	5	–	13	.278	6	–	22	.214
SE Louisiana	3	–	15	.167	7	–	22	.241
Incarnate Word*	2	–	16	.111	5	–	24	.172
† 2015 Southland tournament winner As of March 21, 2015; *Ineligible for postseason play due to Div. I transition **Facing level 2 sanctions due to APR penalties ***Southland tournament #1 seed Rankings from AP poll

The 2014–15 Stephen F. Austin Ladyjacks basketball team represented Stephen F. Austin University during the 2014–15 NCAA Division I women's basketball season. The Ladyjacks were led by fifth year head coach Brandon Schneider and played their home games at the William R. Johnson Coliseum. They are members of the Southland Conference. Winning the Southland Conference regular season championship, the Ladyjacks had an overall record of 23–8 and a conference record of 16–2. After losing the SLC tournament championship game to the Northwestern State Lady Demons, the Ladyjacks were an automatic qualifier to the 2015 Women's National Invitation Tournament where they met the TCU Horned Frogs. The season ended with an 80–85 first round loss to the Horned Frogs in Fort Worth, TX.

== Roster ==
2014–15 Stephen F. Austin Lumberjacks women's basketball team
Players
Coaches

Pos.	#	Name	Height	Year	Previous school	Hometown
F	0	Kaylah Starlinglink	6 ft 1 in (1.85 m)	Fr	Tatum HS	Tatum, TX
G	1	Brittney Matthew	5 ft 7 in (1.7 m)	Sr	Ft. Bend Hightower HS	Houston, TX
G	2	Taylor Ross	5 ft 6 in (1.68 m)	So	Pfluegerville HS	Pfluegerville, TX
G	3	Taylor Schippers	5 ft 8 in (1.73 m)	RS Sr	Concordia Lutheran HS; Butler	Houston, TX
C	5	Porsha Roberts	6 ft 2 in (1.88 m)	Sr	La Vega HS	Waco, TX
G	10	Brentney Branch	5 ft 6 in (1.68 m)	So	Clear Creek HS	Houston, TX
G	20	Victoria Pena	5 ft 7 in (1.7 m)	Jr	Edinburg North HS	Edinburg, TX
F	21	Stevi Parker	6 ft 0 in (1.83 m)	So	Bixby HS; Tulsa	Bixby, OK
G	23	Paulletta Powell	5 ft 8 in (1.73 m)	Jr	Port Arthur Memorial HS	Port Arthur, TX
G	24	Charisma Alexander	5 ft 9 in (1.75 m)	Fr	Georgetown HS	Georgetown, TX
F	25	Danielle Rogers	6 ft 2 in (1.88 m)	Fr	Bishop Lynch HS	DeSoto, TX
F	31	Tierany Henderson	5 ft 11 in (1.8 m)	Sr	Lyndon B. Johnson HS	Austin, TX
C	32	Destiny Bragman	6 ft 2 in (1.88 m)	Sr	Manzano HS; Trinidad State JC	Albuquerque, NM
F	34	LaNesha Middleton	5 ft 10 in (1.78 m)	RS So	Stillwater HS	Stillwater, OK
C	55	Adrienne Lewis	6 ft 1 in (1.85 m)	So	DeSoto HS	DeSoto, TX

Head coach

Brandon Schneider

Assistant coach(es)

Andy Majors
Jodi Greve
Jamila Ganter

Legend

- (C) Team captain
- (S) Suspended
- (I) Ineligible
- (W) Walk-on
- Injured
- Current redshirt

Roster
Last update: 2014-10-18

== Schedule ==
Date time, TV	Rank^{#}	Opponent^{#}	Result	Record	Site (attendance) city, state
Non-conference Schedule
11/15/2014*; 7:30 pm		Louisiana Tech	L 69–76	0–1	William R. Johnson Coliseum (1,833); Nacogdoches, TX
11/18/2014*; 7:00 pm		Prairie View A&M	W 83–73	1–1	William R. Johnson Coliseum (381); Nacogdoches, TX
11/21/2014*; 7:00 pm		Louisiana-Monroe	W 82–54	2–1	William R. Johnson Coliseum (303); Nacogdoches, TX
11/25/2014*; 7:00 pm		St. Edward's	W 65–56	3–1	William R. Johnson Coliseum (378); Nacogdoches, TX
11/28/2014*; 6:00 pm		vs. UC Riverside; University of New Mexico Thanksgiving Classic	L 62–90	3–2	The Pit (425); Albuquerque, NM
11/29/2014*; TBA		at Boston University; University of New Mexico Thanksgiving Classic	L 57–62	3–3	The Pit (5,325); Albuquerque, NM
12/02/2014*; 7:00 pm		Texas A&M–Kingsville	W 90–50	4–3	William R. Johnson Coliseum (344); Nacogdoches, TX
12/06/2014*; 2:00 pm		at Rice	W 70–59	5–3	Tudor Fieldhouse (187); Houston, TX
12/14/2014*; 2:00 pm		at Baylor	L 57–96	5–4	Ferrell Center (5,947); Waco, TX
12/20/2014*; 4:30 pm		Arizona	W 72–60	6–4	William R. Johnson Coliseum (489); Nacogdoches, TX
12/31/2014*; 6:00 pm		Southern Arkansas	W 73–50	7–4	William R. Johnson Coliseum (410); Nacogdoches, TX
Southland Conference Schedule
01/03/2015; 1:00 pm		at McNeese State	L 67–73	7–5 (0–1)	Burton Coliseum (1,046); Lake Charles, LA
01/05/2015; 6:00 pm		Southeastern Louisiana	W 78–71	8–5 (1–1)	William R. Johnson Coliseum (587); Nacogdoches, TX
01/08/2015; 7:00 pm		at Central Arkansas	W 73–46	9–5 (2–1)	Farris Center (512); Conway, AR
01/15/2015; 7:00 pm		New Orleans	W 76–56	10–5 (3–1)	William R. Johnson Coliseum (279); Nacogdoches, TX
01/17/2015; 2:00 pm		at Abilene Christian	W 71–69 ^{OT}	11–5 (4–1)	Moody Coliseum (1,232); Abilene, TX
01/22/2015; 7:00 pm		at Lamar	W 59–54	12–5 (5–1)	Montagne Center (962); Beaumont, TX
01/24/2015; 1:30 pm		at Sam Houston State	L 64–65	12–6 (5–2)	Bernard Johnson Coliseum (1,565); Huntsville, TX
01/31/2015; 4:00 pm		Texas A&M–Corpus Christi	W 64–55	13–6 (6–2)	William R. Johnson Coliseum (1,874); Nacogdoches, TX
02/05/2015; 6:30 pm		at Northwestern State	W 69–61	14–6 (7–2)	Prather Coliseum (1,623); Natchitoches, LA
02/07/2015; 4:00 pm		Houston Baptist	W 72–67	15–6 (8–2)	William R. Johnson Coliseum (1,481); Nacogdoches, TX
02/12/2015; 4:00 pm		at Incarnate Word	W 64–47	16–6 (9–2)	McDermott Center (276); San Antonio, TX
02/14/2015; 1:00 pm, ESPN3		at Texas A&M–Corpus Christi	W 74–62	17–6 (10–2)	American Bank Center (N/A); Corpus Christi, TX
02/19/2015; 7:00 pm		Lamar	W 71–60	18–6 (11–2)	William R. Johnson Coliseum (379); Nacogdoches, TX
02/21/2015; 4:00 pm		Nicholls State	W 68–59	19–6 (12–2)	William R. Johnson Coliseum (648); Nacogdoches, TX
02/26/2015; 4:00 pm		Incarnate Word	W 58–44	20–6 (13–2)	William R. Johnson Coliseum (289); Nacogdoches, TX
02/28/2015; 4:00 pm		at Houston Baptist	W 69–57	21–6 (14–2)	Sharp Gymnasium (820); Houston, TX
03/05/2015; 6:00 pm, ESPN3		Northwestern State	W 56–45	22–6 (15–2)	William R. Johnson Coliseum (3,183); Nacogdoches, TX
03/07/2015; 4:00 pm		Sam Houston State	W 79–65	23–6 (16–2)	William R. Johnson Coliseum (N/A); Nacogdoches, TX
Southland Conference Tournament
03/14/2015; 1:00 pm, ESPN3	(1)	vs. (8) Houston Baptist; Semifinals	L 81–88	23–7	Merrell Center (N/A); Katy, TX
Women's National Invitation Tournament (WNIT)
03/19/2015; 7:00 pm		at TCU; First Round	L 80–85	23–8	Daniel–Meyer Coliseum (722); Fort Worth, TX
*Non-conference game. ^{#}Rankings from AP Poll. (#) Tournament seedings in parentheses. All times are in Central Time.

== See also ==
- 2014–15 Stephen F. Austin Lumberjacks basketball team
