= 2014–15 Lamar Lady Cardinals basketball team =

Intercollegiate basketball season

2014–15 Lamar Lady Cardinals basketball
- Conference: Southland Conference
- Record: 17–13 (14–4 Southland)
- Head coach: Robin Harmony (2nd season)
- Assistant coaches: Randy Schneider (2nd season); Candace Walker (2nd season); Lejon Wright Sr.; Alice Robinson, Student Assistant
- Home arena: Montagne Center (Capacity: 10,080)

For information on all Lamar University sports, see Lamar Cardinals and Lady Cardinals

2014–15 Southland Conference women's basketball standings
	Conf.				Overall
Team	W		L	PCT	W		L	PCT
Stephen F. Austin***	16	–	2	.889	23	–	8	.742
Lamar	14	–	4	.778	17	–	13	.567
Nicholls State	13	–	5	.722	17	–	13	.567
Texas A&M-CC	12	–	6	.667	16	–	14	.533
McNeese State	11	–	7	.611	18	–	14	.563
Northwestern State†	10	–	8	.556	19	–	15	.559
Central Arkansas	10	–	8	.556	17	–	14	.548
Abilene Christian*	9	–	9	.500	17	–	12	.586
Houston Baptist	6	–	12	.333	15	–	18	.455
New Orleans**	6	–	12	.333	8	–	19	.296
Sam Houston State	5	–	13	.278	6	–	22	.214
SE Louisiana	3	–	15	.167	7	–	22	.241
Incarnate Word*	2	–	16	.111	5	–	24	.172
† 2015 Southland tournament winner As of March 21, 2015; *Ineligible for postseason play due to Div. I transition **Facing level 2 sanctions due to APR penalties ***Southland tournament #1 seed Rankings from AP poll

The 2014–15 Lamar Lady Cardinals basketball team represented Lamar University during the 2014–15 NCAA Division I women's basketball season. The Lady Cardinals, led by second year head coach Robin Harmony, played their home games at the Montagne Center and are members of the Southland Conference.

Two Lady Cardinals were recognized by the Southland Conference at the conclusion of the regular season. JaMeisha Edwards was named to both the conference All-Defense team and the All-Southland Conference, 1st team. Dominique Edwards was named to the All-Southland Conference, 3rd team.

== Off season ==
Randy Schneider was promoted to Associate Head Coach on August 4. Lejon Wright joined the Lady Cardinals staff as an assistant coach.

On October 20, 2014, it was announced that senior guard Jameisha Edwards will not play for the Cardinals due to a career ending injury. On December 2, 2014, following medical reevaluation and a compromised participation plan, Jameisha Edwards was cleared to return to the team.

=== Departures ===
Name	Number	Pos.	Height	Year	Hometown	Notes
Departures
Chantelle Brockett	3	Center	6' 1"	Senior	Geelong Australia	Graduated.
Dominique Edwards	25	Forward	5' 11"	Senior	Grand Prairie, TX	Graduated.
Alice Robinson	24	Forward	5' 10"	Senior	Bossier City, LA	Graduated.
Gia Ayers	1	Guard	5' 7"	Senior	Bryan, TX	Graduated.
Francesca Bellatin	10	Forward	6'5"	Senior	Lima Peru	Completed Eligibility.

=== Class of 2014 transfers and high school recruits ===
Name	Pos.	Height	Year	Hometown	High School/Junior College
Transfers
Addesha Collins	Guard	5' 3"	Junior	Anniston, AL	Tallahassee CC
April Levy	Guard	5' 6"	Junior	Jackson, MS	Southwest Mississippi CC
Teleshia Riley	Wing	5' 10"	Sophomore	Brampton, Ontario, Canada	Tallahassee CC
High School Recruits
Baileigh O'Dell	Guard	5' 6"	Freshman	Verdigris, OK	Verdigris High School
Samantha Morgan	Guard	5' 10"	Freshman	Miami, FL	Miami Beach High School
Marquelle Williams	Forward	6' 0"	Freshman	Toledo, OH	Rogers High School
Leah Smith	Forward	5' 11"	Freshman	Fort Lauderdale, FL	Coral Springs Charter High School
Laka Blache	Forward	6' 1"	Freshman	Memphis, TN	Whitehaven High School

2014 Transfers and High School Recruits:

== Roster ==
2014–15 Lamar Lady Cardinals women's basketball team
Players
Coaches

Pos.	#	Name	Height	Year	Previous school	Hometown
F	15	Caroline Adesulu	6 ft 1 in (1.85 m)	Sr	Mansfield Legacy HS	Arlington, Texas
F	35	Laka Blache	6 ft 0 in (1.83 m)	Fr	Whitehaven	Memphis, Tenn.
	33	Kiandra Bowers	5 ft 11 in (1.8 m)	So	Dwyer HS	West Palm Beach, Fla.
G	1	Addesha Collins	5 ft 3 in (1.6 m)	Jr	Saks HS	Anniston, Ala.
F	24	Bethany Cox	5 ft 11 in (1.8 m)	So	Norman HS	Glenpool, Okla.
F	25	Dominique Edwards	5 ft 11 in (1.8 m)	GS	S. Grand Prairie HS	Grand Prairie, Texas
G	20	JaMeisha Edwards	5 ft 5 in (1.65 m)	Jr	Crockett HS	Crockett, Texas
G	14	April Levy	5 ft 5 in (1.65 m)	Jr	Callaway HS	Jackson, Miss.
G	4	Joann Lira	5 ft 4 in (1.63 m)	So	Clear Springs HS	Houston, Texas
G	32	Shauna Long	5 ft 4 in (1.63 m)	Sr	Standing Rock Central HS	Fort Yates, N.D.
	2	Sam Morgan	5 ft 8 in (1.73 m)	Fr	Miami Beach HS	Miami Beach, Fla.
G	5	Baileigh O'Dell	5 ft 3 in (1.6 m)	Fr	Verdigris HS	Claremore, Okla.
G	13	Teleshia Riley	5 ft 10 in (1.78 m)	So	St. Edmond Campion Secondary	Brampton, Ontario
	45	Lejha Smith	5 ft 11 in (1.8 m)	Fr	Coral Springs Charter School	Fort Lauderdale, Fla.
F/C	3	Marquelle Williams	6 ft 1 in (1.85 m)	Fr	Rogers HS	Toledo, Ohio

Head coach

Robin Harmony

Assistant coach(es)

Randy Schneider
Candace Walker
Lejon Wright Sr.

Legend

- (C) Team captain
- (S) Suspended
- (I) Ineligible
- (W) Walk-on
- Injured
- Current redshirt

Roster
Last update: 2014-12-02

== Schedule ==
Date time, TV	Opponent	Result	Record	High points	High rebounds	High assists	Site (attendance) city, state
Out of Conference Schedule
11/14/2014*; 7:00 pm, BRSN	Louisiana-Lafayette	L 55–75	0–1	20 – Edwards, D	8 – Blache	2 – Three players	Montagne Center (894); Beaumont, TX
11/17/2014*; 7:00 pm	Tulsa	L 69–73	0–2	25 – O'Dell	10 – Edwards, D	4 – Cox, Edwards, D	Reynolds Center (896); Tulsa, OK
11/18/2014*; 7:00 pm	at Oklahoma	L 73–100	0–3	24 – Edwards, D	13 – Edwards, D	4 – O'Dell	Lloyd Noble Center (4,201); Norman, OK
11/23/2014*; 2:00 pm, BRSN	UTSA	L 40–72	0–4	8 – Long	8 – Bowers	2 – O'Dell	Montagne Center (630); Beaumont, TX
11/25/2014*; 7:00 pm	at Texas State	L 72–79	0–5	18 – O'Dell	9 – Bowers	3 – O'Dell	Strahan Coliseum (986); San Marcos, TX
11/29/2014*; 4:00 pm, BRSN	St. Thomas	W 67–35	1–5	13 – Collins	8 – Adesulu	5 – O'Dell	Montagne Center (594); Beaumont, TX
12/02/2014*; 7:00 pm, BRSN	Huston–Tillotson	W 95–47	2–5	13 – Adesulu	12 – Bowers	5 – Collins	Montagne Center (685); Beaumont, TX
12/11/2014*; 7:00 pm	at TCU	L 68–72	2–6	18 – Edwards, D	10 – Edwards, D	4 – Edwards, J	University Recreation Center (1,332); Fort Worth, TX
12/14/2014*; 3:00 pm	at Wright State	L 61–82	2–7	17 – Edwards, D	10 – Edwards, D	3 – Edwards, D Bowers	Nutter Center (583); Dayton, OH
12/16/2014*; 6:00 pm	at Ohio Valley University	W 93–42	3–7	16 – Bowers	9 – Edwards, D	6 – Long	Snyder Activity Center (95); Vienna, WV
12/28/2014*; 2:00 pm	at Rice	L 63–97	3–8	19 – Edwards, J	5 – Bowers	4 – Edwards, J	Tudor Fieldhouse (340); Houston, TX
Southland Conference Schedule
01/03/2015; 4:00 pm, BRSN	Nicholls State	W 69–62	4–8 (1–0)	20 – Edwards, J	8 – Smith	7 – Edwards, J	Montagne Center (744); Beaumont, TX
01/05/2015; 5:00 pm	at New Orleans	W 64–54	5–8 (2–0)	17 – Edwards, J	9 – Edwards, D	4 – Collins	Lakefront Arena (309); New Orleans, LA
01/08/2015; 7:00 pm	at Texas A&M-Corpus Christi	L 51–56	5–9 (2–1)	10 – Edwards, D	8 – Adesulu	3 – O'Dell	American Bank Center (565); Corpus Christi, TX
01/13/2015; 7:00 pm, BRSN	Central Arkansas	W 82–46	6–9 (3–1)	24 – Edwards, J	10 – Edwards, D	2 – 6 players	Montagne Center (708); Beaumont, TX
01/15/2015; 7:00 pm, BRSN	Southeastern Louisiana	W 83–60	7–9 (4–1)	18 – O'Dell	11 – Edwards, D	4 – Collins	Montagne Center (661); Beaumont, TX
01/17/2015; 1:00 pm	at Northwestern State	W 82–72	8–9 (5–1)	19 – Long	10 – Edwards, D	6 – Edwards, J	Prather Coliseum (773); Natchitoches, LA
01/22/2015; 7:00 pm, BRSN	Stephen F. Austin	L 54–59	8–10 (5–2)	17 – Edwards, J	11 – Edwards, D	4 – Edwards, D	Montagne Center (962); Beaumont, TX
01/24/2015; 4:00 pm	at Houston Baptist	W 80–64	9–10 (6–2)	21 – Edwards, J	11 – Edwards, D	6 – Edwards, J	Sharp Gymnasium (722); Houston, TX
01/29/2015; 6:30 pm	at Sam Houston State	W 87–68	10–10 (7–2)	22 – Edwards, J	7 – Bowers	7 – Collins	Bernard Johnson Coliseum (851); Huntsville, TX
01/31/2015; 4:00 pm, BRSN	Abilene Christian	W 76–72	11–10 (8–2)	20 – O'Dell	14 – Edwards, D	5 – O'Dell	Montagne Center (943); Beaumont, TX
02/05/2015; 7:00 pm	at Abilene Christian	W 73–58	12–10 (9–2)	29 – Edwards, J	10 – Edwards, D	3 – Edwards, J; Bowers	Moody Coliseum (675); Abilene, TX
02/07/2015; 2:00 pm, ESPN3	at Incarnate Word	W 67–45	13–10 (10–2)	20 – Bowers	10 – Edwards, D	5 – O'Dell	McDermott Center (404); San Antonio, TX
02/12/2015; 7:00 pm, BRSN	Houston Baptist	W 79–62	14–10 (11–2)	26 – Edwards, J	12 – Bowers	4 – Edwards, D; Collins	Montagne Center (765); Beaumont, TX
02/19/2015; 7:00 pm	at Stephen F. Austin	L 60–71	14–11 (11–3)	20 – Collins	15 – Edwards, D	4 – Collins	William R. Johnson Coliseum (379); Nacogdoches, TX
02/21/2015; 4:00 pm, BRSN	McNeese State; Battle of the Border	W 75–67	15–11 (12–3)	22 – Edwards, J	13 – Edwards, D	6 – Edwards, D	Montagne Center (997); Beaumont, TX
02/26/2015; 7:00 pm	at McNeese State; Battle of the Border	L 77–98	15–12 (12–4)	23 – O'Dell	6 – Edwards, D	5 – Edwards, D; Edwards, J	Burton Coliseum (1,002); Lake Charles, LA
02/28/2015; 4:00 pm, BRSN	Incarnate Word	W 81–64	16–12 (13–4)	35 – Edwards, J	10 – Bowers	8 – O'Dell	Montagne Center (842); Beaumont, TX
03/05/2015; 5:30 pm, BRSN	Sam Houston State	W 92–73	17–12 (14–4)	24 – Collins	15 – Edwards, D	6 – O'Dell	Montagne Center (890); Beaumont, TX
Southland Conference Tournament
03/14/2015; 3:30 pm, ESPN3	vs. Northwestern State	L 64–70 ^{OT}	17–13	16 – Bowers	12 – Bowers	5 – Collins; O'Dell	Merrell Center (1,596); Katy, TX
*Non-conference game. ^{#}Rankings from AP Poll. (#) Tournament seedings in parentheses. All times are in Central Time.

== See also ==
- 2014–15 Lamar Cardinals basketball team
