= 2014–15 Central Arkansas Sugar Bears basketball team =

Intercollegiate basketball season

2014–15 Central Arkansas Sugar Bears basketball
- Conference: Southland Conference
- Record: 17–14 (10–8 Southland)
- Head coach: Sandra Rushing (3rd season)
- Assistant coaches: Kaci Bailey (2nd season); Destinee Rogers (2nd season); Chris Sartorius (1st season)
- Home arena: Farris Center (capacity: 6,000)

2014–15 Southland Conference women's basketball standings
	Conf.				Overall
Team	W		L	PCT	W		L	PCT
Stephen F. Austin***	16	–	2	.889	23	–	8	.742
Lamar	14	–	4	.778	17	–	13	.567
Nicholls State	13	–	5	.722	17	–	13	.567
Texas A&M-CC	12	–	6	.667	16	–	14	.533
McNeese State	11	–	7	.611	18	–	14	.563
Northwestern State†	10	–	8	.556	19	–	15	.559
Central Arkansas	10	–	8	.556	17	–	14	.548
Abilene Christian*	9	–	9	.500	17	–	12	.586
Houston Baptist	6	–	12	.333	15	–	18	.455
New Orleans**	6	–	12	.333	8	–	19	.296
Sam Houston State	5	–	13	.278	6	–	22	.214
SE Louisiana	3	–	15	.167	7	–	22	.241
Incarnate Word*	2	–	16	.111	5	–	24	.172
† 2015 Southland tournament winner As of March 21, 2015; *Ineligible for postseason play due to Div. I transition **Facing level 2 sanctions due to APR penalties ***Southland tournament #1 seed Rankings from AP poll

The 2014–15 Central Arkansas Sugar Bears basketball team represented the University of Central Arkansas during the 2014–15 NCAA Division I women's basketball season. The Bears were led by third-year head coach Sandra Rushing and played their home games at the Farris Center. They were members of the Southland Conference. The Sugar Bears entered the 2015 Southland Conference women's basketball tournament as the seventh seed, and were paired against the sixth seeded Northwestern State Lady Demons. The team's season ended with a 49–63 tournament game loss to the Lady Demons. The Sugar Bears' final 2014–15 overall record was 17–14, while their conference record was 10–8.

== Roster ==
2014–15 Central Arkansas Sugar Bears women's basketball team
Players
Coaches

Pos.	#	Name	Height	Year	Previous school	Hometown
G	0	Kelsey McClure	5 ft 8 in (1.73 m)	So	Muskogee HS	Muskogee, OK
F	4	Raquel Logan	6 ft 1 in (1.85 m)	So	West Memphis HS	West Memphis, AR
G	5	Jameka Watkins	5 ft 6 in (1.68 m)	Jr	England HS	England, AR
G	11	Brianna Mullins	5 ft 6 in (1.68 m)	So	Nevada HS	Rosston, AR
G	11	Kendara Watts	5 ft 10 in (1.78 m)	Jr	Fairfield HS; Shelton State CC	Fairfield, Alabama
F	13	Terai Sadler	5 ft 10 in (1.78 m)	Sr	New Plymouth HS	New Plymouth NZ
G	21	Angel Williams	5 ft 7 in (1.7 m)	Fr	Bellaire HS	Bellaire, TX
G	22	Maggie Proffitt	5 ft 7 in (1.7 m)	Fr	Starkville Academy	Columbus, MS
F	23	Brittany Agee	5 ft 11 in (1.8 m)	Sr	Bessemer HS; Shelton State CC	Bessemer, AL
C	24	Peyton Herrell	6 ft 2 in (1.88 m)	So	Jessieville HS	Jessieville, AR
G	25	Olivia McWilliams	5 ft 7 in (1.7 m)	Fr	eStem HS	Little Rock, AR
F	32	Alexis Hardaway	5 ft 10 in (1.78 m)	Jr	HW Byers HS; Austin Peay	Byhalia, MS
F	50	Taisiya Novokreschevnova	6 ft 0 in (1.83 m)	Jr	Frank Phillips College	Moscow Russia

Head coach

- Sandra Rushing

Assistant coach(es)

- Kaci Bailey
- Destinee Rogers
- Chris Sartorius

Legend

- (C) Team captain
- (S) Suspended
- (I) Ineligible
- (W) Walk-on
- Injured
- Current redshirt

Roster
Last update: 2014-10-01

== Schedule ==
Date time, TV	Rank^{#}	Opponent^{#}	Result	Record	Site (attendance) city, state
Out of conference schedule
11/14/2014*; TBA		at WKU; Preseason WNIT	L 57–93	0–1	E. A. Diddle Arena (1,341); Bowling Green, KY
11/21/2014*; 4:00 pm		vs. Eastern Kentucky; Preseason WNIT	L 55–56	0–2	Hawkins Arena (972); Macon, GA
11/22/2014*; 4:00 pm		vs. Jackson State; Preseason WNIT	W 56–45	1–2	Hawkins Arena (1,012); Macon, GA
11/25/2014*; 7:00 pm		Lyon College	W 59–43	2–2	Farris Center (721); Conway, AR
11/29/2014*; 2:00 pm		Jacksonville State	L 54–63	2–3	Farris Center (523); Conway, AR
12/02/2014*; 6:00 pm		at Alcorn State	W 62–36	3–3	Davey Whitney Complex (219); Lorman, MS
12/04/2014*; 7:00 pm		Central Baptist College	W 72–39	4–3	Farris Center (375); Conway, AR
12/06/2014*; 2:00 pm		Southeast Missouri State	L 46–48	4–4	Farris Center (653); Conway, AR
12/13/2014*; 1:00 pm		at Georgia Tech	L 50–88	4–5	Hank McCamish Pavilion (N/A); Atlanta, GA
12/16/2014*; 4:00 pm		Williams Baptist College	W 73–57	5–5	Farris Center (243); Conway, AR
12/19/2014*; 2:00 pm		Blue Mountain College	W 71–30	6–5	Farris Center (203); Conway, AR
12/30/2014*; 2:00 pm		Austin Peay	W 63–54	7–5	Farris Center (395); Conway, AR
Southland Conference schedule
01/04/2015; 1:00 pm		at Abilene Christian	W 66–60	8–5 (1–0)	Moody Coliseum (604); Abilene, TX
01/06/2015; 6:00 pm		Texas A&M–Corpus Christi	W 63–59	9–5 (2–0)	Farris Center (752); Conway, AR
01/08/2015; 7:00 pm		Stephen F. Austin	L 46–73	9–6 (2–1)	Farris Center (512); Conway, AR
01/13/2015; 7:00 pm		at Lamar	L 46–82	9–7 (2–2)	Montagne Center (708); Beaumont, TX
01/15/2015; 7:00 pm		at Houston Baptist	L 37–58	9–8 (2–3)	Sharp Gymnasium (670); Houston, TX
01/21/2015; 7:00 pm		at New Orleans	W 53–46	10–8 (3–3)	Lakefront Arena (393); New Orleans, LA
01/24/2015; 2:00 pm		Nicholls State	L 72–75 ^{OT}	10–9 (3–4)	Farris Center (1,178); Conway, AR
01/28/2015; 7:00 pm		Northwestern State	W 63–46	11–9 (4–4)	Farris Center (522); Conway, AR
02/04/2015; 7:00 pm		at Southeastern Louisiana	W 63–46	12–9 (5–4)	University Center (522); Hammond, LA
02/07/2015; 2:00 pm, ESPN3		New Orleans	L 44–50	13–9 (6–4)	Farris Center (795); Conway, AR
02/12/2015; 6:30 pm		at Northwestern State	L 52–54	13–10 (6–5)	Prather Coliseum (695); Natchitoches, LA
02/15/2015; 1:00 pm		Incarnate Word	W 58–48	14–10 (7–5)	Farris Center (752); Conway, AR
02/18/2015; 7:00 pm		McNeese State	L 63–65	14–11 (7–6)	Farris Center (687); Conway, AR
02/21/2015; 2:00 pm		Sam Houston State	W 66–63	15–11 (8–6)	Farris Center (1,085); Conway, AR
02/26/2015; 6:30 pm		at Sam Houston State	W 64–56	16–11 (9–6)	Bernard Johnson Coliseum (842); Huntsville, TX
02/28/2015; 2:00 pm		Southeastern Louisiana	W 73–57	17–11 (10–6)	Farris Center (912); Conway, AR
03/05/2015; 5:00 pm		at Nicholls State	L 43–53	17–12 (10–7)	Stopher Gym (345); Thibodaux, LA
03/07/2015; 11:00 am		at McNeese State	L 68–72	17–13 (10–8)	Burton Coliseum (1,005); Lake Charles, LA
Southland Conference tournament
03/12/2015; 1:30 pm	(7)	vs. (6) Northwestern State; First round	L 49–63	17–14	Merrell Center (862); Katy, TX
*Non-conference game. ^{#}Rankings from AP Poll. (#) Tournament seedings in parentheses. All times are in Central Time.

== See also ==
- 2014–15 Central Arkansas Bears basketball team
