= 2014–15 Northwestern State Lady Demons basketball team =

Intercollegiate basketball season

2014–15 Northwestern State Lady Demons basketball

Southland tournament Champions

NCAA Women's Tournament, first round
- Conference: Southland Conference
- Record: 19–15 (10–8 Southland)
- Head coach: Brooke Stoehr & Scott Stoehr (3rd season)
- Assistant coaches: Learie Sandy (2nd season); Kasondra Foreman (2nd season)
- Home arena: Prather Coliseum (Capacity: 3,900)

2014–15 Southland Conference women's basketball standings
	Conf.				Overall
Team	W		L	PCT	W		L	PCT
Stephen F. Austin***	16	–	2	.889	23	–	8	.742
Lamar	14	–	4	.778	17	–	13	.567
Nicholls State	13	–	5	.722	17	–	13	.567
Texas A&M-CC	12	–	6	.667	16	–	14	.533
McNeese State	11	–	7	.611	18	–	14	.563
Northwestern State†	10	–	8	.556	19	–	15	.559
Central Arkansas	10	–	8	.556	17	–	14	.548
Abilene Christian*	9	–	9	.500	17	–	12	.586
Houston Baptist	6	–	12	.333	15	–	18	.455
New Orleans**	6	–	12	.333	8	–	19	.296
Sam Houston State	5	–	13	.278	6	–	22	.214
SE Louisiana	3	–	15	.167	7	–	22	.241
Incarnate Word*	2	–	16	.111	5	–	24	.172
† 2015 Southland tournament winner As of March 21, 2015; *Ineligible for postseason play due to Div. I transition **Facing level 2 sanctions due to APR penalties ***Southland tournament #1 seed Rankings from AP poll

The 2014–15 Northwestern State Lady Demons basketball team represented Northwestern State University during the 2014–15 NCAA Division I women's basketball season. The Demons, led by third year co-head coaches Brooke Stoehr and Scott Stoehr, played their home games at Prather Coliseum and were members of the Southland Conference. They finished the season 19–15, 10–8 in Southland play to finish in a tie for sixth place. They were champions of the Southland Women's Basketball Tournament and received an automatic bid to the 2015 NCAA Division I women's basketball tournament. They lost to Baylor in the first round.

== Roster ==
2014–15 Northwestern State Demons women's basketball team
Players
Coaches

Pos.	#	Name	Height	Year	Previous school	Hometown
G	1	Amy Staha	5 ft 10 in (1.78 m)	So	Pflugerville HS	Pflugerville, TX
G	3	Keisha Lee	5 ft 5 in (1.65 m)	Jr	Denham Springs HS	Denham Springs, LA
G	4	TaSheena Moore	5 ft 8 in (1.73 m)	Jr	Frenship HS; South Plains College	Lubbock, TX
G	5	Sami Thomas	5 ft 5 in (1.65 m)	Fr	Pickering HS	Leesville, LA
F	11	Meghan Cross	6 ft 0 in (1.83 m)	Jr	Lynnwoody HS; LSU-Eunice	Lynnwood, WA
G	12	Chelsea Rogers	5 ft 9 in (1.75 m)	Sr	Ruston HS; Jacksonville College	Ruston, LA
G	13	Janelle Perez	5 ft 2 in (1.57 m)	Jr	Horizon HS	El Paso, TX
G	14	Jackie Perez	5 ft 5 in (1.65 m)	Fr	Americas HS	El Paso, TX
F	15	Presley Owens	6 ft 1 in (1.85 m)	Sr	Vancleave HS; Mississippi Gulf Coast CC	Vancleave, MS
G	20	Arianne Ausmer	5 ft 5 in (1.65 m)	Sr	Pass Christian HS	Pass Christian, MS
F	24	Ndey Sonko	6 ft 1 in (1.85 m)	Fr	Medowdale HS	Edmonds, WA
G	30	Beatrice Attura	5 ft 7 in (1.7 m)	So	Frisco Liberty HS	Frisco, TX
F	32	Andreal Fleming	6 ft 0 in (1.83 m)	Fr	Canton HS	Canton, MS
F	44	Tia Youngblood	5 ft 10 in (1.78 m)	Fr	DeRidder HS	DeRidder, LA
G	50	Robin Richardson	5 ft 9 in (1.75 m)	So	Ponchatoula HS	Independence, LA

Head coach

Brooke Stoehr
Scott Stoehr

Assistant coach(es)

Learie Sandy
Kasondra Foreman

Legend

- (C) Team captain
- (S) Suspended
- (I) Ineligible
- (W) Walk-on
- Injured
- Current redshirt

Roster
Last update: 2014-10-10

== Media ==
Select Lady Demon basketball games can be listened to with a Northwestern feed at Demons Showcase. Many opponents have an audio stream available to listen to the games live that aren't done on Demons Showcase. NSU TV will also broadcast most of the Lady Demons wins tape delayed.

== Schedule ==
Date time, TV	Rank^{#}	Opponent^{#}	Result	Record	Site (attendance) city, state
Out of conference schedule
11/14/2014*; 6:30 pm		LeTourneau	W 78–35	1–0	Prather Coliseum (368); Natchitoches, LA
11/18/2014*; 6:30 pm		Louisiana Tech	W 69–57	2–0	Prather Coliseum (1,418); Natchitoches, LA
11/23/2014*; 2:00 pm		at Arkansas	L 30–78	2–1	Bud Walton Arena (1,647); Fayetteville, AR
11/25/2014*; 6:30 pm		LSU-Alexandria	W 86–58	3–1	Prather Coliseum (334); Natchitoches, LA
12/01/2014*; 6:30 pm		Central Baptist College	W 71–43	4–1	Prather Coliseum (315); Natchitoches, LA
12/03/2014*; 11:00 am		at Texas A&M	L 42–75	4–2	Reed Arena (7,712); College Station, TX
12/06/2014*; 6:00 pm		at Grambling State	L 41–44	4–3	Fredrick C. Hobdy Assembly Center (230); Grambling, LA
12/14/2014*; 3:00 pm		at Texas	L 34–74	4–4	Frank Erwin Center (2,302); Austin, TX
12/17/2014*; 6:30 pm		Arkansas-Monticello	W 61–56	5–4	Prather Coliseum (315); Natchitoches, LA
12/20/2014*; 2:00 pm		at Jackson State	L 61–62	5–5	Williams Assembly Center (249); Jackson, MS
12/29/2014*; 7:00 pm		at Oklahoma State	L 44–89	5–6	Gallagher-Iba Arena (2,218); Stillwater, OK
Southland Conference schedule
01/02/2015; 3:00 pm		at Houston Baptist	W 78–68	6–6 (1–0)	Sharp Gymnasium (305); Houston, TX
01/05/2015; 5:30 pm		at Sam Houston State	W 66–57	7–6 (2–0)	Bernard Johnson Coliseum (321); Huntsville, TX
01/07/2015; 6:30 pm		Abilene Christian	W 61–56	8–6 (3–0)	Prather Coliseum (413); Natchitoches, LA
01/10/2015; 1:00 pm		Incarnate Word	W 73–51	9–6 (4–0)	Prather Coliseum (613); Natchitoches, LA
01/14/2015; 7:00 pm		at Texas A&M–Corpus Christi	W 66–59	10–6 (5–0)	American Bank Center (715); Corpus Christi, TX
01/17/2015; 1:00 pm		Lamar	L 72–82	10–7 (5–1)	Prather Coliseum (773); Natchitoches, LA
01/21/2015; 6:30 pm		Nicholls State	W 74–71	11–7 (6–1)	Prather Coliseum (738); Natchitoches, LA
01/24/2015; 1:00 pm		McNeese State	W 75–54	12–7 (7–1)	Prather Coliseum (1,912); Natchitoches, LA
01/28/2015; 7:00 pm		at Central Arkansas	L 46–63	12–8 (7–2)	Farris Center (522); Conway, AR
01/31/2015; 4:30 pm		at Southeastern Louisiana	L 52–58	12–9 (7–3)	University Center (554); Hammond, LA
02/05/2015; 6:30 pm		Stephen F. Austin	L 61–69	12–10 (7–4)	Prather Coliseum (1,623); Natchitoches, LA
02/12/2015; 6:30 pm		Central Arkansas	W 54–52	13–10 (8–4)	Prather Coliseum (695); Natchitoches, LA
02/14/2015; 1:00 pm		at McNeese State	L 57–68	13–11 (8–5)	Burton Coliseum (1,075); Lake Charles, LA
02/18/2015; 6:00 pm		at Nicholls State	L 40–59	13–12 (8–6)	Stopher Gym (617); Thibodaux, LA
02/21/2015; 4:00 pm		at New Orleans	W 75–63	14–12 (9–6)	Lakefront Arena (309); New Orleans, LA
02/26/2015; 6:30 pm		Southeastern Louisiana	W 71–60	15–12 (10–6)	Prather Coliseum (713); Natchitoches, LA
03/05/2015; 6:00 pm, ESPN3		at Stephen F. Austin	L 45–56	15–13 (10–7)	William R. Johnson Coliseum (3,183); Nacogdoches, TX
03/07/2015; 1:00 pm		New Orleans	L 70–72	15–14 (10–8)	Prather Coliseum (1,213); Natchitoches, LA
Southland Conference tournament
03/12/2015; 1:30 pm	(6)	vs. (7) Central Arkansas; First Round	W 63–49	16–14	Merrell Center (862); Katy, TX
03/13/2015; 1:30 pm	(6)	vs. (3) Nicholls State; Quarterfinals	W 84–67	17–14	Merrell Center (860); Katy, TX
03/14/2015; 3:30 pm, ESPN3	(6)	vs. (2) Lamar; Semifinals	W 70–64 ^{OT}	18–14	Merrell Center (1,596); Katy, TX
03/15/2015; 12:00 pm, CBSSN	(6)	vs. (8) Houston Baptist; Championship Game	W 58–50	19–14	Merrell Center (968); Katy, TX
NCAA Division I women's basketball tournament
03/20/2015*; 1:33 pm, ESPN2	(15)	at (2) No. 5 Baylor; First Round	L 36–77	19–15	Ferrell Center (4,775); Waco, TX
*Non-conference game. ^{#}Rankings from AP Poll. (#) Tournament seedings in parentheses. All times are in Central Time.

== See also ==
- 2014–15 Northwestern State Demons basketball team
