= 2014–15 Sam Houston State Bearkats women's basketball team =

Intercollegiate basketball season

2014–15 Sam Houston State Bearkats women's basketball
- Conference: Southland Conference
- Record: 6–22 (5–13 Southland)
- Head coach: Brenda Welch-Nichols (9th season)
- Assistant coaches: Rosalind Jennings (1st season); Stacy Stephens (1st season)
- Home arena: Bernard Johnson Coliseum (Capacity: 6,100)

2014–15 Southland Conference women's basketball standings
	Conf.				Overall
Team	W		L	PCT	W		L	PCT
Stephen F. Austin***	16	–	2	.889	23	–	8	.742
Lamar	14	–	4	.778	17	–	13	.567
Nicholls State	13	–	5	.722	17	–	13	.567
Texas A&M-CC	12	–	6	.667	16	–	14	.533
McNeese State	11	–	7	.611	18	–	14	.563
Northwestern State†	10	–	8	.556	19	–	15	.559
Central Arkansas	10	–	8	.556	17	–	14	.548
Abilene Christian*	9	–	9	.500	17	–	12	.586
Houston Baptist	6	–	12	.333	15	–	18	.455
New Orleans**	6	–	12	.333	8	–	19	.296
Sam Houston State	5	–	13	.278	6	–	22	.214
SE Louisiana	3	–	15	.167	7	–	22	.241
Incarnate Word*	2	–	16	.111	5	–	24	.172
† 2015 Southland tournament winner As of March 21, 2015; *Ineligible for postseason play due to Div. I transition **Facing level 2 sanctions due to APR penalties ***Southland tournament #1 seed Rankings from AP poll

The 2014–15 Sam Houston State Bearkats women's basketball team represented Sam Houston State University during the 2014–15 NCAA Division I women's basketball season. The Bearkats, led by ninth-year head coach Brenda Welch-Nichols, played their home games at the Bernard Johnson Coliseum and were members of the Southland Conference.

== Roster ==
2014–15 Sam Houston State Bearkats women's basketball team
Players
Coaches

Pos.	#	Name	Height	Year	Previous school	Hometown
G	1	Sally Clavelle	5 ft 8 in (1.73 m)	Jr	Karr HS	New Orleans, LA
G	3	Shernise Robertson	5 ft 6 in (1.68 m)	Jr	Cy Falls HS; Tyler JC	Cypress, TX
G	4	Jasmin Anderson	5 ft 7 in (1.7 m)	Jr	Loyola Prep	Shreveport, LA
G	5	Morghen Day	5 ft 6 in (1.68 m)	So	Rockwall HS	Rockwall, TX
G	10	Angela Delaney	5 ft 8 in (1.73 m)	Fr	Harker Heights HS	Killeen, TX
G	11	Taylor Dorsey	5 ft 6 in (1.68 m)	So	Dunbar HS	Fort Worth, TX
F	12	Angela Beadle	6 ft 3 in (1.91 m)	Sr	Crockett HS	Austin, TX
F	14	Jasmine Robinson	6 ft 1 in (1.85 m)	Sr	Trimble Tech	Fort Worth
G	15	Summer Fife	5 ft 11 in (1.8 m)	Sr	Liberty Christian HS	Fort Worth, TX
F	21	Jazmin Wiley	5 ft 11 in (1.8 m)	Sr	Dunbar HS	Fort Worth, TX
G	23	Amanda Barnes	5 ft 5 in (1.65 m)	GS	Martin HS	Arlington, TX
F	25	Saundra Guillory	6 ft 1 in (1.85 m)	Fr	Anderson HS	Austin, TX
F	30	Alexandria Kimble	5 ft 11 in (1.8 m)	RS Fr	Floyd E. Kellam HS	Virginia Beach, VA
F	31	Maygan Washington	5 ft 10 in (1.78 m)	Fr	Smithville HS	Smithville, TX
G	32	Krystin Curtis	5 ft 5 in (1.65 m)	Fr	Trinity Christian HS	Cedar Hill, TX
F	33	Shadijah Moore	6 ft 2 in (1.88 m)	Jr	Shelton State	Demopolis, AL
G	34	Zhane Anderson	5 ft 6 in (1.68 m)	Jr	Not Listed	Lufkin, TX

Head coach

Brenda Welch-Nichols

Assistant coach(es)

Rosalind Jennings
Stacy Stephens

Legend

- (C) Team captain
- (S) Suspended
- (I) Ineligible
- (W) Walk-on
- Injured
- Current redshirt

Roster
Last update: 2014-10-17

== Schedule ==
Date time, TV	Opponent	Result	Record	Site (attendance) city, state
Exhibition
11/08/2014*; 6:00 pm	Mary Hardin–Baylor	W 85–67	-	Bernard Johnson Coliseum (N/A); Huntsville, TX
Out of conference schedule
11/15/2014*; 3:30 pm, SECN+	at LSU	L 45–71	0–1	Pete Maravich Assembly Center (2,102); Baton Rouge, LA
11/21/2014*; 11:00 am	Wiley College	L 48–65	0–2	Bernard Johnson Coliseum (2,566); Huntsville, TX
11/24/2014*; 6:00 pm	South Dakota State	L 49–60	0–3	Frost Arena (1,557); Brookings, SD
11/28/2014*; 5:00 pm	vs. USC; SMU Thannksgiving Classic	L 67–88	0–4	Moody Coliseum (738); Dallas, TX
11/29/2014*; 7:00 pm	at Florida A&M; SMU Thanksgiving Classic	L 67–69	0–5	Moody Coliseum (364); Dallas, TX
12/03/2014*; 6:30 pm	Texas Southern	W 61–54	1–5	Bernard Johnson Coliseum (639); Huntsville, TX
12/06/2014*; 2:00 pm	at Louisiana–Lafayette	L 46–65	1–6	Cajundome (269); Lafayette, LA
12/17/2014*; 6:30 pm	Prairie View A&M	L 53–70	1–7	Bernard Johnson Coliseum (597); Huntsville, TX
12/21/2014*; 1:00 pm	at TCU	L 55–79	1–8	University Recreation Center (1,350); Fort Worth, TX
12/28/2014*; 2:00 pm	at Wichita State	L 46–70	1–9	Charles Koch Arena (1,608); Wichita, KS
Southland Conference schedule
01/03/2015; 2:00 pm	Incarnate Word	W 59–55	2–9 (1–0)	Bernard Johnson Coliseum (234); Huntsville, TX
01/05/2015; 5:30 pm	Northwestern State	L 57–66	2–10 (1–1)	Bernard Johnson Coliseum (321); Huntsville, TX
01/08/2015; 7:00 pm	at Southeastern Louisiana	L 76–78	2–11 (1–2)	University Center (316); Hammond, LA
01/10/2015; 4:00 pm	at New Orleans	W 75–59	3–11 (2–2)	Lakefront Arena (347); New Orleans, LA
01/15/2015; 6:00 pm	at Nicholls State	L 64–67	3–12 (2–3)	Stopher Gym (407); Thibodaux, LA
01/17/2015; 2:00 pm	McNeese State	L 74–79	3–13 (2–4)	Bernard Johnson Coliseum (477); Huntsville, TX
01/22/2015; 7:00 pm	at Abilene Christian	W 63–58	4–13 (3–4)	Moody Coliseum (875); Abilene, TX
01/24/2015; 2:00 pm	Stephen F. Austin	W 65–64	5–13 (4–4)	Bernard Johnson Coliseum (1,565); Huntsville, TX
01/29/2015; 6:30 pm	Lamar	L 68–87	5–14 (4–5)	Bernard Johnson Coliseum (851); Huntsville, TX
01/31/2015; 2:00 pm, ESPN3	Houston Baptist	W 74–67	6–14 (5–5)	Bernard Johnson Coliseum (807); Huntsville, TX
02/07/2015; 2:00 pm	Texas A&M–Corpus Christi	L 50–63	6–15 (5–6)	Bernard Johnson Coliseum (948); Huntsville, TX
02/12/2015; 6:30 pm	Abilene Christian	L 48–63	6–16 (5–7)	Bernard Johnson Coliseum (903); Huntsville, TX
02/14/2015; 4:00 pm	at Houston Baptist	L 61–66	6–17 (5–8)	Sharp Gymnasium (680); Houston, TX
02/21/2015; 2:00 pm	at Central Arkansas	L 63–66	6–18 (5–9)	Farris Center (1,085); Conway, AR
02/26/2015; 6:30 pm	Central Arkansas	L 56–64	6–19 (5–10)	Bernard Johnson Coliseum (842); Huntsville, TX
02/28/2015; 12:00 pm	at Texas A&M–Corpus Christi	L 52–60	6–20 (5–11)	American Bank Center (789); Corpus Christi, TX
03/05/2015; 5:30 pm, BRSN	at Lamar	L 73–92	6–21 (5–12)	Montagne Center (890); Beaumont, TX
03/07/2015; 4:00 pm	at Stephen F. Austin	L 65–79	6–22 (5–13)	William R. Johnson Coliseum (N/A); Nacogdoches, TX
*Non-conference game. ^{#}Rankings from AP Poll. (#) Tournament seedings in parentheses. All times are in Central Time.

== See also ==
- 2014–15 Sam Houston State Bearkats men's basketball team
