= 2015 Southland Conference women's basketball tournament =

- Classification: Division I
- Season: 2014–15
- Teams: 8
- Site: Merrell Center; Katy, Texas
- Champions: Northwestern State (3 title)
- Winning coach: Brooke Stoehr and Brad Stoehr (2 title)
- MVP: Beatrice Attura (Northwestern State)
- Attendance: 4,286
- Television: SLC Digital/ESPN3/CBSSN

2014–15 Southland Conference women's basketball standings
	Conf.				Overall
Team	W		L	PCT	W		L	PCT
Stephen F. Austin***	16	–	2	.889	23	–	8	.742
Lamar	14	–	4	.778	17	–	13	.567
Nicholls State	13	–	5	.722	17	–	13	.567
Texas A&M-CC	12	–	6	.667	16	–	14	.533
McNeese State	11	–	7	.611	18	–	14	.563
Northwestern State†	10	–	8	.556	19	–	15	.559
Central Arkansas	10	–	8	.556	17	–	14	.548
Abilene Christian*	9	–	9	.500	17	–	12	.586
Houston Baptist	6	–	12	.333	15	–	18	.455
New Orleans**	6	–	12	.333	8	–	19	.296
Sam Houston State	5	–	13	.278	6	–	22	.214
SE Louisiana	3	–	15	.167	7	–	22	.241
Incarnate Word*	2	–	16	.111	5	–	24	.172
† 2015 Southland tournament winner As of March 21, 2015; *Ineligible for postseason play due to Div. I transition **Facing level 2 sanctions due to APR penalties ***Southland tournament #1 seed Rankings from AP poll

The 2015 Southland Conference women's basketball tournament, a part of the 2014–15 NCAA Division I women's basketball season, took place March 11–14, 2015 at the Merrell Center in Katy, Texas. The winner of the tournament received the Southland Conference's automatic bid to the 2015 NCAA tournament.

== Seeds & Regular Season Standings ==
Only the Top 8 teams advanced to the Southland Conference tournament. If a team ineligible for the NCAA Tourney finished in the top 8, their seed would fall to the next eligible team. Abilene Christian and Incarnate Word were ineligible for post-season play as they were in the second year of a 4-year transition from D2 to D1. They were not eligible for the Southland tourney until 2018. This chart shows all the teams records and standings and explains why teams advanced to the conference tourney or finished in certain tiebreaking positions.

2015 Southland Conference women's basketball tournament seeds
Seed	School	Conference Record	Overall Record (End of Regular Season)	Tiebreaker
1.	Stephen F. Austin‡*	16–2	23–6	
2.	Lamar*	14–4	17–12	
3.	Nicholls State#	13–5	17–12	
4.	Texas A&M–Corpus Christi#	12–6	16–13	
5.	McNeese State	11–7	17–12	
6.	Northwestern State	10–8	15–14	1–1 vs. Nicholls State
7.	Central Arkansas	10–8	17–13	0–2 vs. Nicholls State
8.	Abilene Christian	9–9	17–12	D1 transitioning, ineligible for NCAA Tourney
9.	Houston Baptist	6–12	12–17	
10.	New Orleans	6–12	8–19	Low APR, ineligible for NCAA Tourney
11.	Sam Houston State	5–13	6–22	
12.	Southeastern Louisiana	3–15	7–22	
13.	Incarnate Word	2–16	5–24	D1 transitioning, ineligible for NCAA Tourney
‡ – Southland Conference regular season champions. * – Received a first-round and second-round bye in the conference tournament. # – Received a first-round bye in the conference tournament. Overall record are as of the end of the regular season.

== Schedule ==
Session	Game	Time*	Matchup^{#}	Television
First round – Thursday, March 12
1	1	11:00 am	#5 McNeese State vs. #8 Houston Baptist	SLC Digital
1	2	1:30 pm	#6 Northwestern State vs. #7 Central Arkansas	SLC Digital
Quarterfinals – Friday, March 13
2	3	11:00 am	#4 Texas A&M–Corpus Christi vs. #8 Houston Baptist	SLC Digital
2	4	1:30 pm	#3 Nicholls State vs. #6 Northwestern State	SLC Digital
Semifinals – Saturday, March 14
3	5	1:00 pm	#1 Stephen F. Austin vs. #8 Houston Baptist	ESPN3
3	6	3:30 pm	#2 Lamar vs. #6 Northwestern State	ESPN3
Championship – Sunday, March 15
4	7	12:00 pm	#6 Northwestern State vs #8 Houston Baptist	CBSSN
*Game times in CST. #-Rankings denote tournament seeding.

== Bracket ==
First round Thursday, March 12; SLC Digital
5	McNeese State	68
8	Houston Baptist	70
7	Central Arkansas	49
6	Northwestern State	63

Quarterfinals; Friday, March 13; SLC Digital
4	Texas A&M–Corpus Christi	48
8	Houston Baptist	49
3	Nicholls State	67
6	Northwestern State	84

Semifinals; Saturday, March 14; ESPN3
1	Stephen F. Austin	81
8	Houston Baptist	88
2	Lamar	64
6	Northwestern State	70 OT

Championship Game; Sunday, March 15; CBSSN
6	Northwestern State	58
8	Houston Baptist	50

== Game summaries ==
SLC Digital Network

Mar 12
11:00 am

Recap

Houston Baptist Huskies 70, McNeese State Cowgirls 68
Scoring by half: 39–35, 31–33
Pts: Anna Strickland 16; Rebs: Anna Strickland 20; Asts: Tayler Jefferson 4	Pts: Jayln Johnson 17; Rebs: Talisa Boyd 12; Asts: Jayln Johnson 8

Merrell Center
Katy, TX
Attendance: N/A
Referees: Doug Williams; Travis Jones; Jaclyn Watson

SLC Digital Network

Mar 12
1:30 pm

Recap

Northwestern State Lady Demons 63, Central Arkansas Sugar Bears 49
Scoring by half: 23–24, 40–25
Pts: Keisha Lee 19; Rebs: Presley Owens 6 Asts: Presley Owens; Janelle Perez 4	Pts: Terai Sadler; Brianna Mullins 10; Rebs: Jameka Watkins 8 Asts: Jameka Watkins 4

Merrell Center
Katy, TX
Attendance: 862
Referees: Marlin Ramsey; Britton Sherry; Kristin McKinnon

SLC Digital Network

Mar 13
11:00 am

Recap

Houston Baptist Huskies 49, Texas A&M–Corpus Christi Islanders 48
Scoring by half: 20–25, 29–23
Pts: Erin McGarrachan 16; Rebs: Erin McGarrachan 10; Asts: Heidi Sihvola 4	Pts: Kassie Jone 13; Rebs: Shay Weaver 6 Asts: Shay Weaver; Kassie Jones 4

Merrell Center
Katy, TX
Attendance: N/A
Referees: Jeff Malham; Toby Martinez; Pat Boeh

SLC Digital Network

Mar 13
1:30 pm

Recap

Northwestern State Lady Demons 84, Nicholls Colonels 67
Scoring by half: 38–31, 46–36
Pts: Janelle Perez 24; Rebs: Chelsea Rogers 8 Asts: Chelsea Rogers 5	Pts: Jenny Nash 18; Rebs: Ekiya Gray 8 Asts: Tia Charles 5

Merrell Center
Katy, TX
Attendance: 860
Referees: Marc Meritt; Chaney Muench; Travis Jones

ESPN3

Mar 14
1:00 pm

Recap

Stephen F. Austin Ladyjacks 81, Houston Baptist Huskies 88
Scoring by half: 41–37, 40–51
Pts: Porsha Roberts 22; Rebs: Porsha Roberts 8 Asts: Brittney Matthew 6	Pts: Tayler Jefferson 29; Rebs: Anna Strickland 8 Asts: Rachel Arthur 6

Merrell Center
Katy, TX
Attendance: N/A
Referees: Chaney Muench; Jules Gallien; Travis Jones

ESPN3

Mar 14
3:30 pm

Recap

Lamar Lady Cardinals 64, Northwestern State Lady Demons 70 (OT)
Scoring by half: 39–30, 19–28 Overtime: 6–12
Pts: Kiandra Bowers 16; Rebs: Kiandra Bowers 12; Asts: Addesha Collins; Baleigh O'Dell 5	Pts: Janell Perez 24; Rebs: Chelsea Rogers 12; Asts: Chelsea Rogers 3

Merrell Center
Katy, TX
Attendance: 1,596
Referees: John Fletcher; D'Lynn Schertz; Britton Sherry

CBSSN

Mar 15
12:00 pm

Recap

Northwestern State Lady Demons 58, Houston Baptist Huskies 50
Scoring by half: 23–23, 35–27
Pts: Beatrice Attura 19; Rebs: Chelsea Rogers 10; Asts: Janelle Perez 7	Pts: Erin McGarrachan 22; Rebs: Anna Strickland 13; Asts: Heidi Sihvola 8

Merrell Center
Katy, TX
Attendance: 968
Referees: Brian Garland; John Fletcher; Chaney Muench

== Awards and honors ==
Tournament MVP: Beatrice Attura – Northwestern State

All-Tournament Teams:

- Beatrice Attura – Northwestern State
- Janelle Perez – Northwestern State
- Porscha Rogers – Stephen F. Austin
- Erin McGarrachan – Houston Baptist
- Tayler Jefferson – Houston Baptist

== See also ==
- 2015 Southland Conference men's basketball tournament
- Southland Conference women's basketball tournament
