= 2014–15 Incarnate Word Cardinals women's basketball team =

Intercollegiate basketball season

2014–15 Incarnate Word Cardinals women's basketball
- Conference: Southland Conference
- Record: 5–24 (2–16 Southland)
- Head coach: Kate Henderson (1st season)
- Assistant coaches: Alexis Green (1st season); Jamie Nash (2nd season); Bryant Porter (1st season)
- Home arena: McDermott Convocation Center (Capacity: 2,000)

2014–15 Southland Conference women's basketball standings
	Conf.				Overall
Team	W		L	PCT	W		L	PCT
Stephen F. Austin***	16	–	2	.889	23	–	8	.742
Lamar	14	–	4	.778	17	–	13	.567
Nicholls State	13	–	5	.722	17	–	13	.567
Texas A&M-CC	12	–	6	.667	16	–	14	.533
McNeese State	11	–	7	.611	18	–	14	.563
Northwestern State†	10	–	8	.556	19	–	15	.559
Central Arkansas	10	–	8	.556	17	–	14	.548
Abilene Christian*	9	–	9	.500	17	–	12	.586
Houston Baptist	6	–	12	.333	15	–	18	.455
New Orleans**	6	–	12	.333	8	–	19	.296
Sam Houston State	5	–	13	.278	6	–	22	.214
SE Louisiana	3	–	15	.167	7	–	22	.241
Incarnate Word*	2	–	16	.111	5	–	24	.172
† 2015 Southland tournament winner As of March 21, 2015; *Ineligible for postseason play due to Div. I transition **Facing level 2 sanctions due to APR penalties ***Southland tournament #1 seed Rankings from AP poll

The 2014–15 Incarnate Word Cardinals women's basketball team represented the University of the Incarnate Word during the 2014–15 NCAA Division I women's basketball season. The Cardinals, led by first-year head coach Kate Henderson, played their home games at McDermott Convocation Center. They are members of the Southland Conference.

The 2014–15 season was year 2 of a four-year transitional period for Incarnate Word from Division II to Division I. In years 2–4 Incarnate Word was classified as a Division I school for scheduling purposes. They played a full conference schedule, and they could have won the regular-season conference title. However, Incarnate Word were not permitted to participate in the conference tourney until the 2017–18 season, at which time they were also able to enter the NCAA tournament, should they win the conference. Incarnate Word was eligible to participate in the WBI or WNIT should they be invited.

== Audio streaming ==
All Incarnate Word games were broadcast on KUIW Radio, and they provided streaming of all non-televised home games shown via UIW TV.

== Roster ==
2014–15 Incarnate Word Cardinals women's basketball team
Players
Coaches

Pos.	#	Name	Height	Year	Previous school	Hometown
G	3	Jazmine Holman	5 ft 8 in (1.73 m)	Fr	Arlington Bowie HS	Arlington, TX
G	10	Haley Frias	5 ft 8 in (1.73 m)	Fr	Georgetown HS	Georgetown, TX
G	11	Alyssa Ward	5 ft 8 in (1.73 m)	So	Palmeto HS	Palmetto, FL
PG	12	Melina Merritt	5 ft 8 in (1.73 m)	Fr	Cedar Ridge HS	Round Rock, TX
PG	20	Aricka Adams	5 ft 5 in (1.65 m)	Jr	Round Rock HS; Temple	Round Rock, TX
G	22	Jordan Franks	5 ft 9 in (1.75 m)	Jr	Norman HS; Eastern Oklahoma	Norman, OK
F	23	Samantha Swarts	6 ft 0 in (1.83 m)	Jr	Faith Academy HS; Temple	Liberty Hill, TX
F	24	Quincy Baker	6 ft 2 in (1.88 m)	Fr	Klein HS	Houston, TX
F	25	Yvonne Maosa	5 ft 10 in (1.78 m)	Jr	Mansfield HS; Jacksonville College	Mansfield, TX
C	31	Krystal Ochulo	6 ft 2 in (1.88 m)	Fr	Roosevelt HS	Flower Mound, TX
F	32	Breanna Bimingham	6 ft 0 in (1.83 m)	Jr	Harper Creek HS; Kalamazoo Valley CC	Battle Creek, MI
C	33	Shanise Brooks	6 ft 1 in (1.85 m)	Jr	Highland Park HS; Seward CC	Topeka, KS
G	41	Cheyenne Berry	5 ft 9 in (1.75 m)	Fr	Lytle HS; Tarleton State	Lytle, TX

Head coach

- Kate Henderson

Assistant coach(es)

- Alexis Green
- Jamie Nash
- Bryant Porter

Legend

- (C) Team captain
- (S) Suspended
- (I) Ineligible
- (W) Walk-on
- Injured
- Current redshirt

Roster
Last update: 2024-04-09

== Schedule ==
Date time, TV	Opponent	Result	Record	Site (attendance) city, state
Out-of-conference schedule
11/14/2014*; 6:00 pm	Texas Wesleyan	L 66–74	0–1	McDermott Center (618); San Antonio, TX
11/17/2014*; 7:00 pm	at Houston	W 50–48	1–1	Hofheinz Pavilion (526); Houston, TX
10/20/2014*; 6:00 pm	St. Thomas	W 64–49	2–1	McDermott Center (175); San Antonio, TX
11/23/2014*; 2:00 pm	at Indiana	L 49–85	2–2	Assembly Hall (2,140); Bloomington, IN
11/28/2014*; 12:00 pm	vs. Fordham; UTSA Classic	L 42–74	2–3	Convocation Center (N/A); San Antonio, TX
11/30/2014*; 4:30 pm	at UTSA; UTSA Classic	L 31–57	2–4	Convocation Center (849); San Antonio, TX
12/04/2014*; 7:00 pm, ESPN3	at Kansas	L 46–68	2–5	Allen Fieldhouse (1,498); Lawrence, KS
12/10/2014*; 7:00 pm	Texas Lutheran	W 61–42	3–5	McDermott Center (275); San Antonio, TX
12/15/2014*; 6:00 pm	Our Lady of the Lake	L 92–104	3–6	McDermott Center (379); San Antonio, TX
12/18/2014*; 7:00 pm	at UTPA	L 61–65	3–7	UTPA Fieldhouse (440); Edinburg, TX
12/30/2014*; 6:00 pm	Grand Canyon	L 67–72	3–8	McDermott Center (175); San Antonio, TX
Southland Conference schedule
01/03/2015; 2:00 pm	at Sam Houston State	L 55–59	3–9 (0–1)	Bernard Johnson Coliseum (234); Huntsville, TX
01/08/2015; 6:00 pm	New Orleans	W 71–59	4–9 (1–1)	McDermott Center (211); San Antonio, TX
01/10/2015; 1:00 pm	at Northwestern State	L 51–73	4–10 (1–2)	Prather Coliseum (613); Natchitoches, LA
01/17/2015; 2:00 pm	Southeastern Louisiana	W 82–70	5–10 (2–2)	McDermott Center (818); San Antonio, TX
01/22/2015; 6:00 pm	McNeese State	L 101–104 ^{2OT}	5–11 (2–3)	McDermott Center (286); San Antonio, TX
01/24/2015; 2:00 pm	at Abilene Christian	L 54–78	5–12 (2–4)	Moody Coliseum (1,125); Abilene, TX
01/29/2015; 7:00 pm	at Texas A&M–Corpus Christi	L 54–63	5–13 (2–5)	Dugan Wellness Center (785); Corpus Christi, TX
01/31/2014; 1:00 pm	at Nicholls State	L 34–67	5–14 (2–6)	Stopher Gym (404); Thibodaux, LA
02//4/2015; 6:00 pm	Nicholls State	L 58–69	5–15 (2–7)	McDermott Center (566); San Antonio, TX
02/07/2015; 6:00 pm, ESPN3	Lamar	L 45–67	5–16 (2–8)	McDermott Center (404); San Antonio, TX
02/12/2015; 6:00 pm	Stephen F. Austin	L 47–64	5–17 (2–9)	McDermott Center (276); San Antonio, TX
02/15/2015; 1:00 pm	at Central Arkansas	L 49–58	5–18 (2–10)	Farris Center (752); Conway, AR
02/19/2015; 6:00 pm	at Houston Baptist	L 64–67	5–19 (2–11)	Sharp Gymnasium (223); Houston, TX
02/21/2015; 2:00 pm	Texas A&M–Corpus Christi	L 49–61	5–20 (2–12)	McDermott Center (1,085); San Antonio, TX
02/26/2015; 7:00 pm	at Stephen F. Austin	L 44–58	5–21 (2–13)	William R. Johnson Coliseum (289); Nacogdoches, TX
02/28/2015; 4:00 pm	at Lamar	L 64–81	5–22 (2–14)	Montagne Center (842); Beaumont, TX
03/05/2015; 6:00 pm	Abilene Christian	L 62–72	5–23 (2–15)	McDermott Center (1,021); San Antonio, TX
03/07/2015; 2:00 pm	Houston Baptist	L 71–81	5–24 (2–16)	McDermott Center (216); San Antonio, TX
*Non-conference game. ^{#}Rankings from AP poll. (#) Tournament seedings in parentheses. All times are in Central Time.

== See also ==
- 2014–15 Incarnate Word Cardinals men's basketball team
