= 2014–15 Texas A&M–Corpus Christi Islanders women's basketball team =

Intercollegiate basketball season

2014–15 Texas A&M–Corpus Christi Islanders women's basketball
- Conference: Southland Conference
- Record: 16–14 (12–6 Southland)
- Head coach: Royce Chadwick (3rd season)
- Assistant coaches: Roxanne White (Associate head coach) (3rd season); Darren Brunson (3rd season); Geoff Grawn (13th season)
- Home arena: American Bank Center (Capacity: 8,280); Dugan Wellness Center (Capacity: 1,200)

2014–15 Southland Conference women's basketball standings
	Conf.				Overall
Team	W		L	PCT	W		L	PCT
Stephen F. Austin***	16	–	2	.889	23	–	8	.742
Lamar	14	–	4	.778	17	–	13	.567
Nicholls State	13	–	5	.722	17	–	13	.567
Texas A&M-CC	12	–	6	.667	16	–	14	.533
McNeese State	11	–	7	.611	18	–	14	.563
Northwestern State†	10	–	8	.556	19	–	15	.559
Central Arkansas	10	–	8	.556	17	–	14	.548
Abilene Christian*	9	–	9	.500	17	–	12	.586
Houston Baptist	6	–	12	.333	15	–	18	.455
New Orleans**	6	–	12	.333	8	–	19	.296
Sam Houston State	5	–	13	.278	6	–	22	.214
SE Louisiana	3	–	15	.167	7	–	22	.241
Incarnate Word*	2	–	16	.111	5	–	24	.172
† 2015 Southland tournament winner As of March 21, 2015; *Ineligible for postseason play due to Div. I transition **Facing level 2 sanctions due to APR penalties ***Southland tournament #1 seed Rankings from AP poll

The 2014–15 Texas A&M–Corpus Christi Islanders men's basketball team represented Texas A&M University–Corpus Christi in the 2014–15 NCAA Division I women's basketball season. This was head coach Royce Chadwick's third season at Texas A&M–Corpus Christi. The Islanders are members of the Southland Conference and played their home games at the American Bank Center and the Dugan Wellness Center. The team finished the season with a 16–14 record including one game in the 2015 Southland Conference women's basketball tournament. The Islanders's conference record was 12–6 with a fourth-place finish.

== Media ==
Video streaming of all non-televised home games and audio for all road games is available at GoIslanders.com.

== Roster ==
2014–15 Texas A&M–Corpus Christi Islanders women's basketball team
Players
Coaches

Pos.	#	Name	Height	Year	Previous school	Hometown
G	1	Jennifer Ramirez	5 ft 6 in (1.68 m)	Jr	ASA College	Bronx, NY
G	2	Shelby Miskell	5 ft 4 in (1.63 m)	Fr	New Braunfels Christian Academy	New Braunfels, TX
G	3	Emmeri Archer	5 ft 7 in (1.7 m)	Fr	South Shore HS	Brooklyn, NY
F	4	Camesha Davis	6 ft 1 in (1.85 m)	So	Desoto HS	Desoto, TX
G	10	Shay Weaver	5 ft 9 in (1.75 m)	Jr	Marshall HS	Arlington, TX
G	11	Kassie Jones	5 ft 7 in (1.7 m)	So	Lufkin HS	Lufkin, TX
G	13	Ashley James	5 ft 5 in (1.65 m)	Fr	Marcus HS	Flower Mound, TX
G	14	Shola Adebayo	5 ft 8 in (1.73 m)	Sr	Eastern Oklahoma State CC	Oklahoma City, OK
G	15	Brittany Mbamalu	5 ft 8 in (1.73 m)	So	Dulles HS	Houston, TX
F	22	Ashanti Plummer	6 ft 2 in (1.88 m)	Jr	NYC Museum HS	Manhattan, NY
F	23	Gee Lawler	6 ft 1 in (1.85 m)	Jr	San Jacinto JC	Bloomfield Hills, MI
F	24	Doshi Davis	6 ft 1 in (1.85 m)	So	Memorial HS	Port Arthur, TX
F	33	Olivia Fouty	6 ft 0 in (1.83 m)	Sr	Eastern Michigan	Toledo, OH
F	44	Jaiton Wells	6 ft 2 in (1.88 m)	Fr	Stony Point HS	Round Rock, TX

Head coach

Royce Chadwick

Assistant coach(es)

Roxanne White
Darren Brunson
Geoff Grawn

Legend

- (C) Team captain
- (S) Suspended
- (I) Ineligible
- (W) Walk-on
- Injured
- Current redshirt

Roster
Last update: 2014-10-18

== Schedule and results ==
Date time, TV	Rank^{#}	Opponent^{#}	Result	Record	Site (attendance) city, state
Exhibition
11/09/2014*; 2:00 pm		Texas A&M International	W 74–60		Dugan Wellness Center (315); Corpus Christi, TX
Out of Conference Schedule
11/14/2014*; 6:00 pm		at UNLV	L 65–77	0–1	Cox Pavilion (1,066); Las Vegas, NV
11/21/2014*; 7:00 pm		Houston	L 66–68	0–2	Dugan Wellness Center (565); Corpus Christi, TX
11/24/2014*; 6:00 pm		at Rice	L 54–59	0–3	Tudor Fieldhouse (379); Houston, TX
11/19/2013*; 6:00 pm		vs. Kent State; Cal Poly/ShareSLO Holiday Tournament	W 57–47	1–3	Mott Gym (105); San Luis Obispo, CA
11/29/2014*; 9:00 pm		at Cal Poly; Cal Poly/ShareSLO Holiday Tournament	L 48–63	1–4	Mott Gym (281); San Luis Obispo, CA
12/06/2014*; 2:00 pm		at Texas–Pan American	W 60–57	2–4	UTPA Fieldhouse (362); Edinburg, TX
12/13/2014*; 5:00 pm		Texas–Arlington	L 28–42	2–5	Dugan Wellness Center (284); Corpus Christi, TX
12/15/2014*; 5:00 pm		Tennessee State	L 61–72	2–6	American Bank Center (N/A); Corpus Christi, TX
12/17/2014*; 7:00 pm		Oakland	L 54–61	2–7	American Bank Center (579); Corpus Christi, TX
12/20/2014*; 1:00 pm		Texas Southern	W 68–63	3–7	American Bank Center (657); Corpus Christi, TX
12/30/2014*; 5:00 pm		Huston–Tillotson University	W 99–33	4–7	American Bank Center (N/A); Corpus Christi, TX
Southland Conference Schedule
01/06/2015; 6:00 pm		at Central Arkansas	L 59–63	4–8 (0–1)	Farris Center (752); Conway, AR
01/08/2015; 7:00 pm		Lamar	W 56–51	5–8 (1–1)	American Bank Center (565); Corpus Christi, TX
01/10/2014; 4:30 pm		McNeese State	W 76–65	6–8 (2–1)	Dugan Wellness Center (839); Corpus Christi, TX
01/14/2015; 7:00 pm		Northwestern State	L 59–66	6–9 (2–2)	American Bank Center (715); Corpus Christi, TX
01/17/2015; 1:00 pm		at Nicholls State	W 75–59	7–9 (3–2)	Stopher Gym (317); Thibodaux, LA
01/22/2015; 7:00 pm		at Southeastern Louisiana	W 74–53	8–9 (4–2)	University Center (343); Hammond, LA
01/24/2015; 4:00 pm		at New Orleans	W 58–46	9–9 (5–2)	Lakefront Arena (508); New Orleans, LA
01/29/2015; 7:00 pm		Incarnate Word	W 63–54	10–9 (6–2)	Dugan Wellness Center (785); Corpus Christi, TX
01/31/2015; 4:00 pm		at Stephen F. Austin	L 55–64	10–10 (6–3)	William R. Johnson Coliseum (1,874); Nacogdoches, TX
02/05/2015; 7:00 pm		at Houston Baptist	L 54–59	10–11 (6–4)	Sharp Gymnasium (590); Houston, TX
02/07/2015; 2:00 pm		at Sam Houston State	W 63–50	11–11 (7–4)	Bernard Johnson Coliseum (948); Huntsville, TX
02/12/2015; 7:00 pm		New Orleans	W 66–52	12–11 (8–4)	American Bank Center (645); Corpus Christi, TX
02/14/2015; 1:00 pm, ESPN3		Stephen F. Austin	L 62–74	12–12 (8–5)	American Bank Center (N/A); Corpus Christi, TX
02/18/2015; 7:00 pm		at Abilene Christian	L 41–76	12–13 (8–6)	Moody Coliseum (1,128); Abilene, TX
02/21/2015; 2:00 pm		at Incarnate Word	W 61–49	13–13 (9–6)	McDermott Center (566); San Antonio, TX
02/28/2015; 12:00 pm		Sam Houston State	W 60–52	14–13 (10–6)	American Bank Center (789); Corpus Christi, TX
03/05/2015; 5:00 pm		Houston Baptist	W 73–47	15–13 (11–6)	American Bank Center (N/A); Corpus Christi, TX
03/07/2015; 1:00 pm		Abilene Christian	W 60–40	16–13 (12–6)	American Bank Center (N/A); Corpus Christi, TX
Southland Conference tournament
03/13/2015; 11:00 am	(4)	vs. (8) Houston Baptist; Quarterfinals	L 48–49	16–14	Merrell Center (N/A); Katy, TX
*Non-conference game. ^{#}Rankings from AP Poll. (#) Tournament seedings in parentheses.

== See also ==
- 2014–15 Texas A&M–Corpus Christi Islanders men's basketball team
