= Burton Coliseum =

Arena in Lake Charles, Louisiana

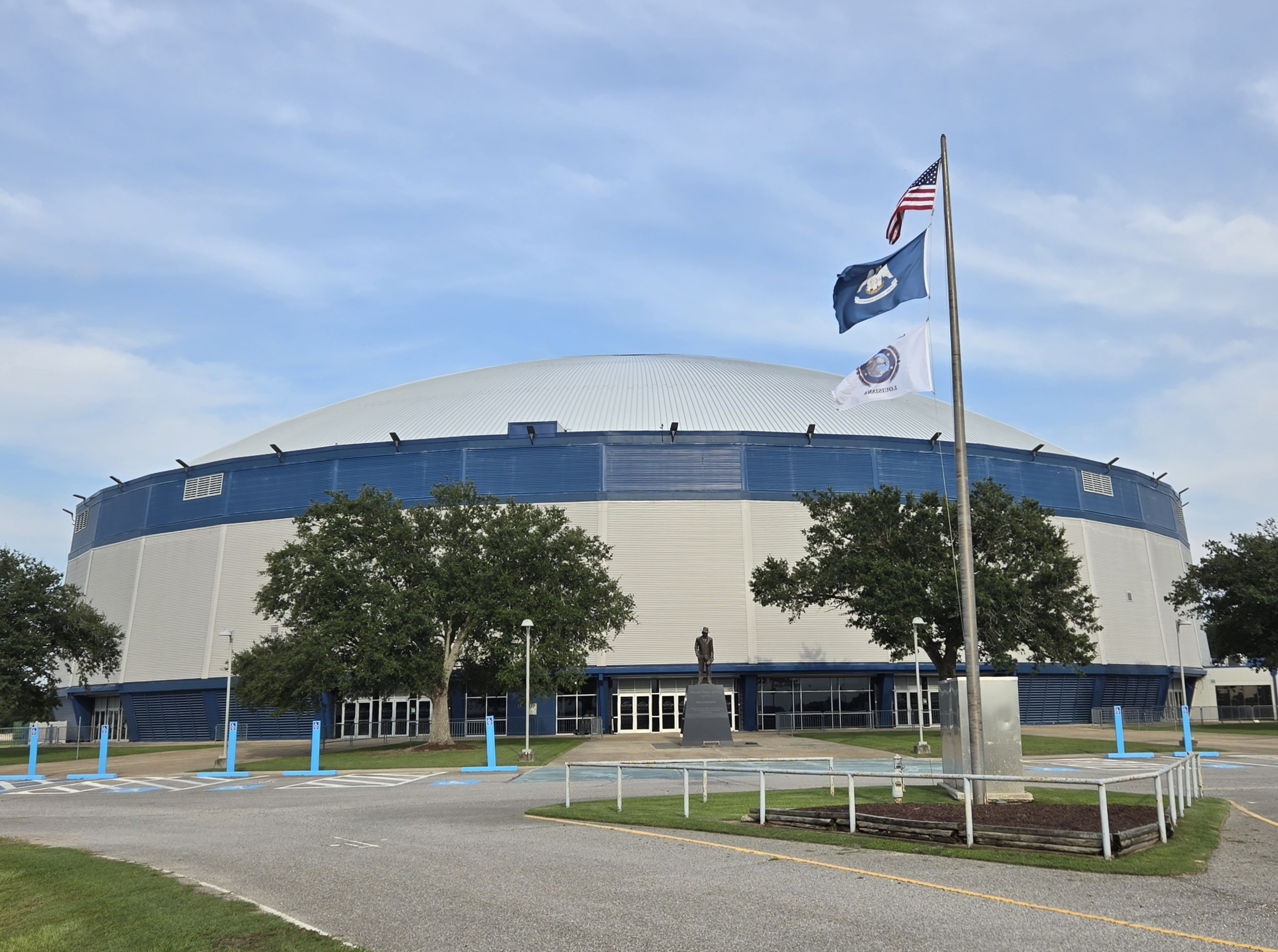
- Burton Coliseum located in the Burton Complex
- Interactive map of Burton Coliseum
- Location: 7001 Gulf Highway; Common Street; Lake Charles, Louisiana 70607
- Coordinates: 30.136989°N 93.211476°W
- Owner: Calcasieu Parish Police Jury
- Operator: McNeese State University
- Capacity: 8,500
- Surface: Concrete

Construction
- Built: 1976
- Opened: 1977

Tenants
- McNeese State Cowboys basketball McNeese State Cowgirls basketball

Website
- www.burtoncomplex.com

The Burton Coliseum, built in 1976, is located in Lake Charles, Louisiana.

The arena contains a domed roof and stands 105 feet from the floor to the top of the roof. It and other buildings in the Burton Complex serve many purposes. The coliseum served as home to the McNeese State Cowboys and Cowgirls basketball teams from 1986 to 2018. The coliseum has a total seating capacity of 8,500 including 6,500-permanent seat multi-purpose arena and 2,000 in temporary seating.

In 2014, Burton Coliseum started hosting the semifinals and finals of the Louisiana High School Athletic Association's boys basketball state tournaments.

Additional uses for Burton Coliseum includes rodeos, equestrian events, concerts, trade shows, and conventions, Festivals, and Mardi Gras Balls. The Complex operates 314 event days annually.

== Burton Complex ==
The Burton Coliseum was one component of a multi-building 50-acre site. Buildings in the Burton Complex include the following:

- Burton Coliseum – (discussed above)
  - The Chalkey Room – a banquet room in the coliseum.
- Burton Event Barn – A 160,000 sq ft building used for various types of events including livestock shows, flea markets, and car shows
- Burton Arena – A 50,000 sq ft building used for equestrian and rodeo events
- RV Park – 275 units with utilities

The complex was used for numerous events including education events, western events, McNeese State basketball and rodeo competition, high school tournaments, flea markets, and livestock shows. Around 200 events were held at the complex each year.

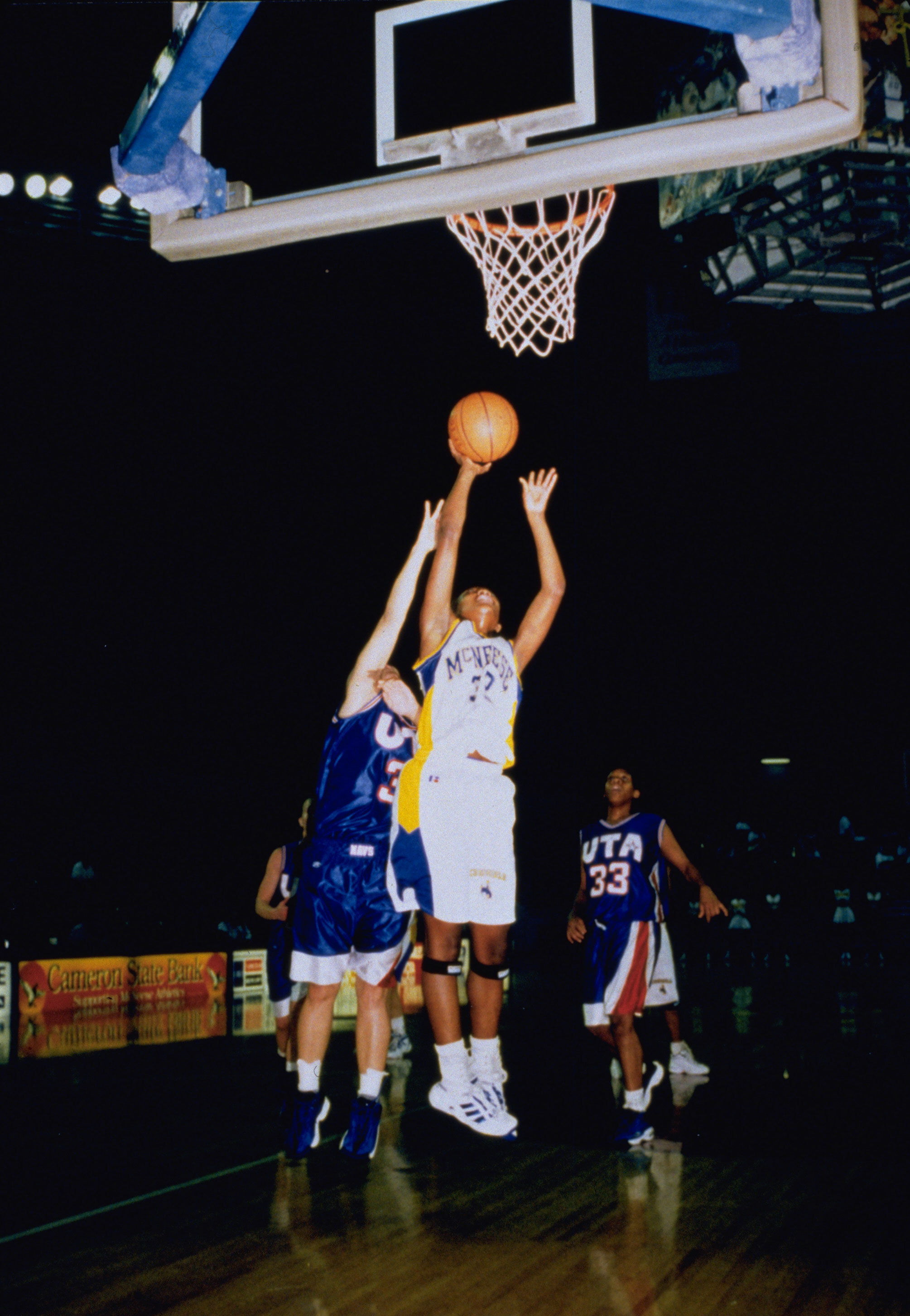
McNeeseStateU basketball v UTArlington

== Gallery ==
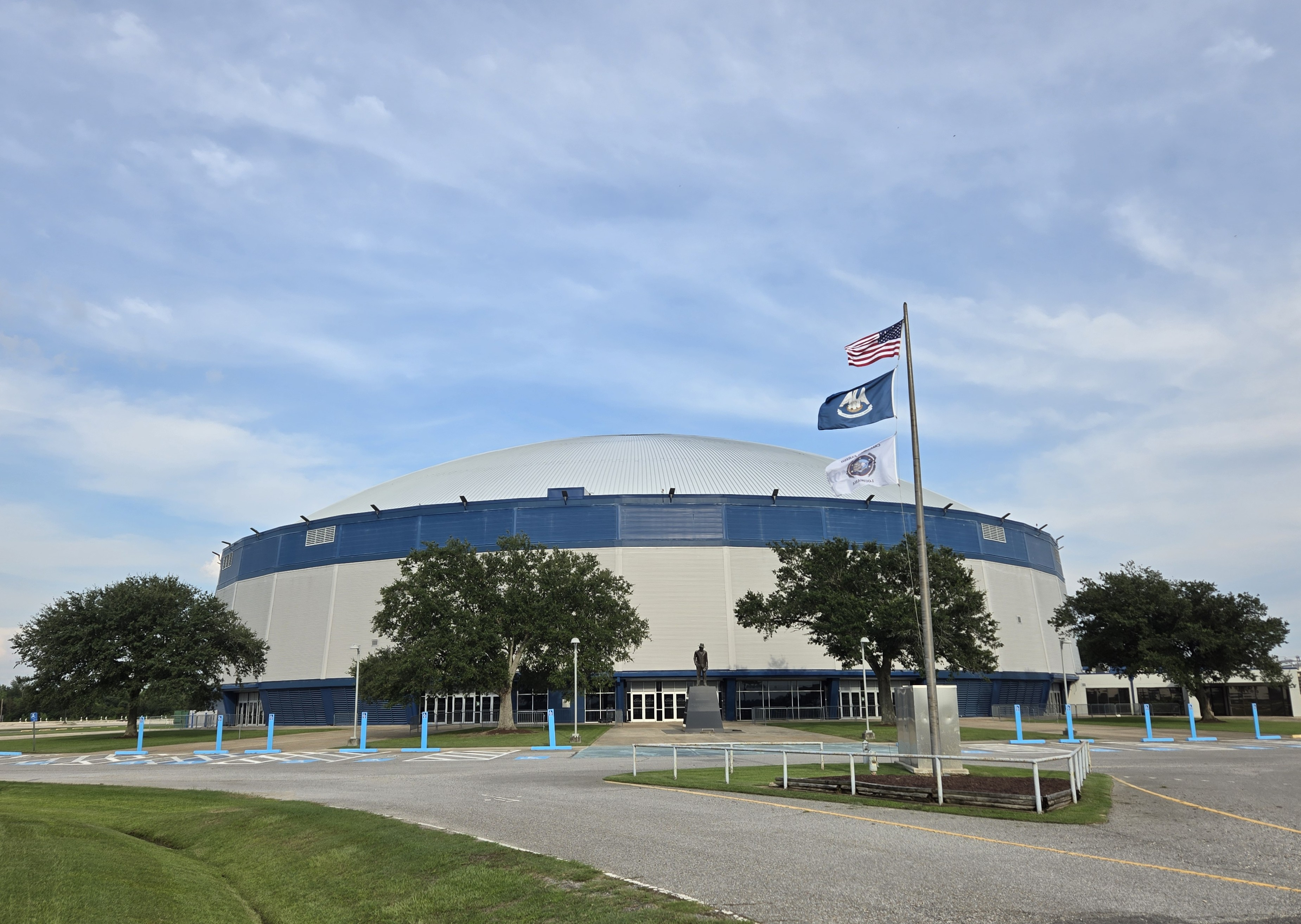
Burton Coliseum main entrance

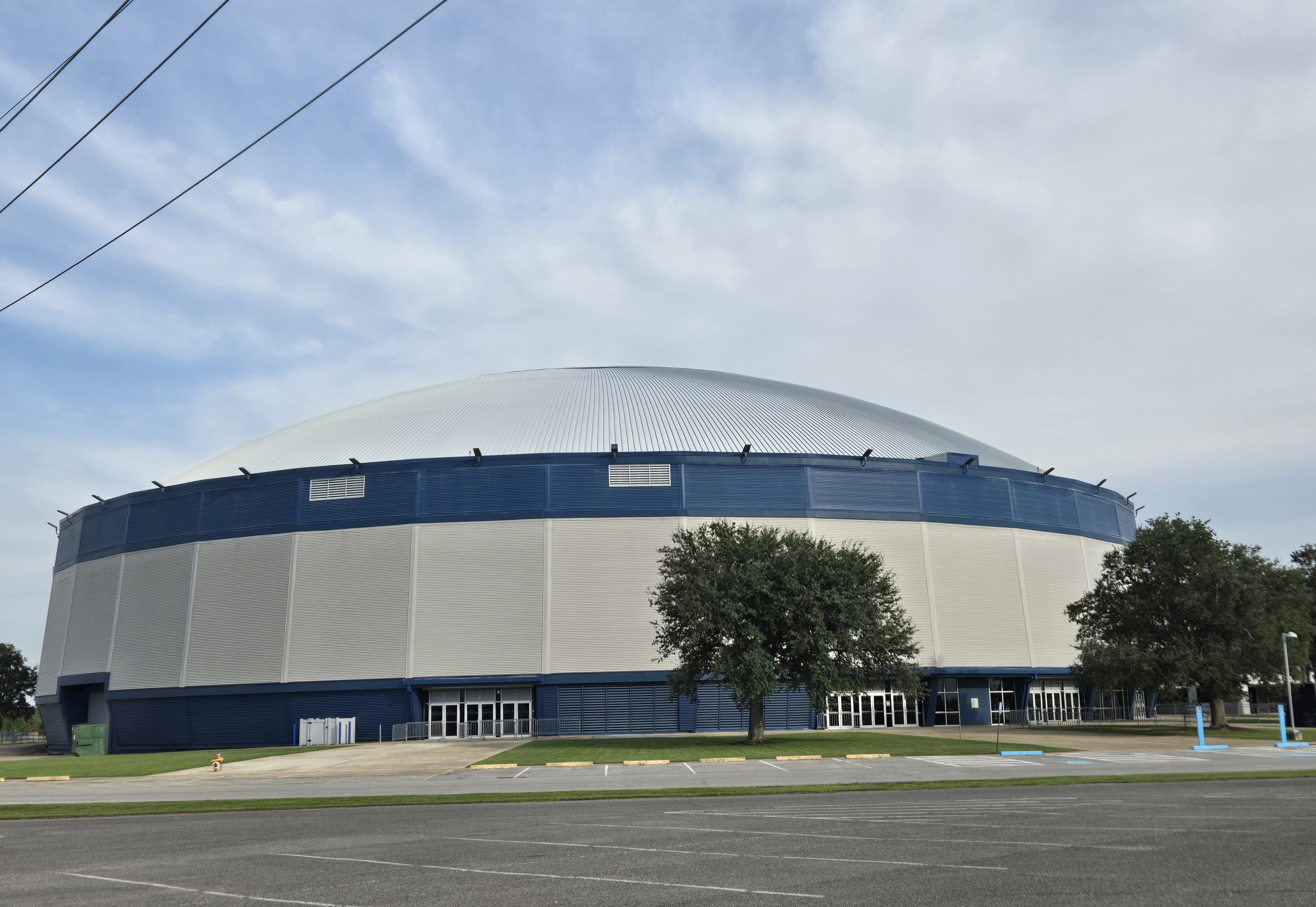
Burton Coliseum side view

== See also ==
- List of convention centers in the United States
- List of NCAA Division I basketball arenas
- List of music venues
