= 2014–15 Middle Tennessee Blue Raiders women's basketball team =

Intercollegiate basketball season

2014–15 Middle Tennessee Blue Raiders women's basketball

WNIT, Quarterfinals
- Conference: Conference USA
- Record: 24–10 (14–4 C-USA)
- Head coach: Rick Insell (10th season)
- Assistant coaches: Kim Brewton; Tom Hodges; Shalon Pillow
- Home arena: Murphy Center

2014–15 Conference USA women's basketball standings
	Conf.				Overall
Team	W		L	PCT	W		L	PCT
WKU †	16	–	2	.889	30	–	5	.857
Middle Tennessee	14	–	4	.778	24	–	10	.706
Southern Miss	13	–	5	.722	25	–	11	.694
Old Dominion	11	–	7	.611	21	–	13	.618
UAB	11	–	7	.611	18	–	13	.581
UTSA	11	–	7	.611	16	–	15	.516
Louisiana Tech	10	–	8	.556	16	–	15	.516
Charlotte	10	–	8	.556	15	–	17	.469
Marshall	8	–	10	.444	17	–	15	.531
Florida Atlantic	7	–	11	.389	13	–	17	.433
UTEP	7	–	11	.389	12	–	16	.429
Rice	4	–	14	.222	9	–	21	.300
North Texas	4	–	14	.222	5	–	24	.172
FIU	0	–	18	.000	3	–	26	.103
† 2015 C-USA tournament winner As of 29 March 2015; Rankings from AP poll

The 2014–15 Middle Tennessee Blue Raiders women's basketball team represented Middle Tennessee State University during the 2014–15 NCAA Division I women's basketball season. The Blue Raiders, led by 10th-year head coach Rick Insell, played their home games at the Murphy Center and were second year members of Conference USA. They finished the season 24–10, 14–4 in C-USA play to finish in second place. They advanced to the semifinals of the C-USA women's tournament, where they lost to Southern Miss. They were invited to the Women's National Invitation Tournament, where they defeated Ball State in the first round, Arkansas State in the second round and Ole Miss in the third round before falling to Temple in the quarterfinals.

== Roster ==
2014–15 Middle Tennessee Blue Raiders women's basketball team
Players
Coaches

Pos.	#	Name	Height	Year	Previous school	Hometown
G	2	Hannah Preservati	5 ft 8 in (1.73 m)	RS Fr	Princeton HS	Princeton, WV
G	3	Abbey Sissom	5 ft 8 in (1.73 m)	Fr	Cannon County HS	Woodbury, TN
G	5	Shanice Cason	5 ft 6 in (1.68 m)	Sr	Siegel HS	Murfreesboro, TN
F	10	Mackenzie Sells	5 ft 10 in (1.78 m)	Jr	Livingston Academy	Livingston, TN
G/F	12	Brea Edwards	5 ft 10 in (1.78 m)	Jr	Central Arizona College	Rockford, IL
G	20	Ty Petty	5 ft 7 in (1.7 m)	So	Riverdale HS	Murfreesboro, TN
F	22	Rebecca Reuter	6 ft 2 in (1.88 m)	Fr	Bradley Central HS	Cleveland, TN
F	23	Gabby Lyon	6 ft 0 in (1.83 m)	Fr	Science Hill HS	Johnson City, TN
G	24	China Dow	5 ft 8 in (1.73 m)	So	Christian Academy of Louisville	Louisville, KY
F	30	Caya Williams	6 ft 1 in (1.85 m)	So	Mount Juliet, TN	Mount Juliet, TN
F	31	TiAnna Porter	6 ft 2 in (1.88 m)	RS Jr	Pittsburgh	Paris, TN
G	32	Caroline Warden	5 ft 7 in (1.7 m)	Jr	Jackson County HS	Gainesboro, TN
G/F	34	Olivia Jones	5 ft 10 in (1.78 m)	So	Riverdale HS	Murfreesboro, TN

Head coach

Rick Insell

Assistant coach(es)

Kim Brewton
Tom Hodges
Shalon Pillow

Legend

- (C) Team captain
- (S) Suspended
- (I) Ineligible
- (W) Walk-on
- Injured
- Current redshirt

Roster

== Rankings ==
Regular season polls
Poll	Pre- Season	Week 2	Week 3	Week 4	Week 5	Week 6	Week 7	Week 8	Week 9	Week 10	Week 11	Week 12	Week 13	Week 14	Week 15	Week 16	Week 17	Week 18	Final
AP	NR	NR	NR	NR	NR	NR	NR	NR	NR	NR	NR	RV	RV	NR	NR	NR	NR	NR	NR
Coaches	NR	NR	NR	NR	NR	NR	NR	NR	NR	NR	NR	NR	NR	NR	NR	NR	NR	NR	NR

Legend
	Increase in ranking
	Decrease in ranking
	No change
(RV)	Received votes
(NR)	Not ranked

== Schedule ==
Date time, TV	Rank^{#}	Opponent^{#}	Result	Record	Site (attendance) city, state
Exhibition
11/06/2014*; 7:00 pm		Martin Methodist	W 93–44	–	Murphy Center (2,116); Murfreesboro, TN
11/10/2014*; 5:00 pm		Alabama–Huntsville	W 75–50	–	Murphy Center (N/A); Murfreesboro, TN
Regular season
11/14/2014*; 6:00 pm		at Arizona State	L 67–81	0–1	Wells Fargo Arena (5,799); Tempe, AZ
11/17/2014*; 7:00 pm, ASN		Miami (FL)	W 53–48	1–1	Murphy Center (3,806); Murfreesboro, TN
11/20/2014*; 7:00 pm		Arkansas	L 51–58	1–2	Murphy Center (N/A); Murfreesboro, TN
11/23/2014*; 3:00 pm		at Ole Miss	W 71–65	2–2	Tad Smith Coliseum (1,075); Oxford, MS
12/03/2014*; 11:00 am		Clemson	W 68–29	3–2	Murphy Center (11,307); Murfreesboro, TN
12/07/2014*; 2:00 pm		Xavier	W 90–68	4–2	Murphy Center (3,398); Murfreesboro, TN
12/12/2014*; 8:00 pm, SECN		at No. 8 Kentucky	L 62–78	4–3	Memorial Coliseum (4,761); Lexington, KY
12/15/2014*; 7:00 pm		at South Dakota State	L 61–65	4–4	Frost Arena (1,026); Brookings, SD
12/20/2014*; 2:00 pm		UCF	W 79–57	5–4	Murphy Center (3,925); Murfreesboro, TN
12/28/2014*; 2:00 pm		at Tennessee Tech	W 98–76	6–4	Eblen Center (1,291); Cookeville, TN
01/04/2015; 2:00 pm		at UAB	W 76–68	7–4 (1–0)	Bartow Arena (368); Birmingham, AL
01/08/2015; 5:00 pm		at FIU	W 75–60	8–4 (2–0)	FIU Arena (N/A); Miami, FL
01/10/2015; 4:00 pm		at Florida Atlantic	W 101–69	9–4 (3–0)	FAU Arena (588); Boca Raton, FL
01/15/2015; 7:00 pm		Southern Miss	L 75–77	9–5 (3–1)	Murphy Center (3,912); Murfreesboro, TN
01/17/2015; 7:00 pm, ASN		Louisiana Tech	W 82–59	10–5 (4–1)	Murphy Center (4,917); Murfreesboro, TN
01/22/2015; 6:00 pm		at Old Dominion	W 65–48	11–5 (5–1)	Ted Constant Convocation Center (1,892); Norfolk, VA
01/24/2015; 11:00 am, FSN		at Charlotte	W 84–54	12–5 (6–1)	Dale F. Halton Arena (768); Charlotte, NC
01/29/2015; 7:00 pm		UTSA	W 73–53	13–5 (7–1)	Murphy Center (4,605); Murfreesboro, TN
01/31/2015; 11:00 am, FSN		UTEP	W 74–53	14–5 (8–1)	Murphy Center (4,465); Murfreesboro, TN
02/05/2015; 6:00 pm		at Southern Miss	L 65–70 ^{OT}	14–6 (8–2)	Reed Green Coliseum (1,277); Hattiesburg, MS
02/07/2015; 6:00 pm		at Louisiana Tech	W 68–44	15–6 (9–2)	Thomas Assembly Center (1,907); Ruston, LA
02/12/2015; 7:00 pm		Rice	W 79–61	16–6 (10–2)	Murphy Center (4,094); Murfreesboro, TN
02/14/2015; 4:00 pm		North Texas	W 85–59	17–6 (11–2)	Murphy Center (4,414); Murfreesboro, TN
02/19/2015; 12:00 pm		at Marshall	W 74–48	18–6 (12–2)	Cam Henderson Center (531); Huntington, WV
02/21/2015; 2:00 pm		at WKU	L 60–63	18–7 (12–3)	E. A. Diddle Arena (3,023); Bowling Green, KY
02/28/2015; 5:00 pm		UAB	L 57–62	18–8 (12–4)	Murphy Center (4,307); Murfreesboro, TN
03/05/2015; 8:00 pm		FIU	W 79–30	19–8 (13–4)	Murphy Center (3,605); Murfreesboro, TN
03/07/2015; 10:30 am		Florida Atlantic	W 73–60	20–8 (14–4)	Murphy Center (3,512); Murfreesboro, TN
Conference USA Tournament
03/12/2015; 1:30 pm, ASN		vs. Louisiana Tech; Quarterfinals	W 77–58	21–8	Bartow Arena (632); Birmingham, AL
03/13/2015; 10:00 am, CBSSN		vs. Southern Miss; Semifinals	L 53–65	21–9	Birmingham–Jefferson Convention Complex (N/A); Birmingham, AL
WNIT
03/19/2015*; 7:00 pm		Ball State; First Round	W 69–58	22–9	Murphy Center (2,519); Murfreesboro, TN
03/22/2015*; 2:00 pm		Arkansas State; Second Round	W 70–60	23–9	Murphy Center (2,806); Murfreesboro, TN
03/26/2015*; 7:00 pm		Ole Miss; Third Round	W 82–70	24–9	Murphy Center (2,806); Murfreesboro, TN
03/29/2015*; 4:00 pm		Temple; Quarterfinals	L 57–69	24–10	Murphy Center (2,587); Murfreesboro, TN
*Non-conference game. ^{#}Rankings from AP Poll. (#) Tournament seedings in parentheses. All times are in Central Time.

== See also ==
- 2014–15 Middle Tennessee Blue Raiders men's basketball team
