= 2014–15 Marshall Thundering Herd women's basketball team =

Intercollegiate basketball season

2014–15 Marshall Thundering Herd women's basketball

WBI, Quarterfinals
- Conference: Conference USA
- Record: 17–15 (8–10 C-USA)
- Head coach: Matt Daniel (2nd season)
- Assistant coaches: Tony Kemper; Caronica Randle; Devrinn Paul
- Home arena: Cam Henderson Center

2014–15 Conference USA women's basketball standings
	Conf.				Overall
Team	W		L	PCT	W		L	PCT
WKU †	16	–	2	.889	30	–	5	.857
Middle Tennessee	14	–	4	.778	24	–	10	.706
Southern Miss	13	–	5	.722	25	–	11	.694
Old Dominion	11	–	7	.611	21	–	13	.618
UAB	11	–	7	.611	18	–	13	.581
UTSA	11	–	7	.611	16	–	15	.516
Louisiana Tech	10	–	8	.556	16	–	15	.516
Charlotte	10	–	8	.556	15	–	17	.469
Marshall	8	–	10	.444	17	–	15	.531
Florida Atlantic	7	–	11	.389	13	–	17	.433
UTEP	7	–	11	.389	12	–	16	.429
Rice	4	–	14	.222	9	–	21	.300
North Texas	4	–	14	.222	5	–	24	.172
FIU	0	–	18	.000	3	–	26	.103
† 2015 C-USA tournament winner As of 29 March 2015; Rankings from AP poll

The 2014–15 Marshall Thundering Herd women's basketball team represented the Marshall University during the 2014–15 NCAA Division I women's basketball season. The Thundering Herd, led by third year head coach Matt Daniel, played their home games at the Cam Henderson Center and were members of Conference USA. They finished the season 17–15, 8–10 for in C-USA play to finish in ninth place. They lost in the quarterfinals of the C-USA women's tournament to Charlotte. They were invited to the Women's Basketball Invitational, where they defeated Northern Kentucky in the first round before losing to Mercer in the quarterfinals.

== Roster ==
2014–15 Marshall Thundering Herd women's basketball team
Players
Coaches

Pos.	#	Name	Height	Year	Previous school	Hometown
F	0	Talequia Hamilton	6 ft 0 in (1.83 m)	Jr	Cincinnati	Huntington, WV
G/F	1	Leah Scott	6 ft 0 in (1.83 m)	Sr	Iowa Western CC	Detroit, MI
G	3	AJ Johnson	5 ft 5 in (1.65 m)	Sr	Northeast CC	Silver Spring, MD
G	4	Taylor Porter	5 ft 8 in (1.73 m)	RS So	Murray State	Fort Gay, WV
G	5	McKenzie Akers	5 ft 6 in (1.68 m)	So	Princeton Senior HS	Princeton, WV
G	11	Aja Sorrells	5 ft 9 in (1.75 m)	Sr	Hutchinson CC	Athens, GA
G	20	Norrisha Victrum	5 ft 5 in (1.65 m)	Jr	Columbia HS	Columbia, SC
F	21	Chelsey Romero	6 ft 1 in (1.85 m)	So	Kecoughtan HS	Hampton, VA
G	22	Kiana Evans	6 ft 0 in (1.83 m)	So	Huntington HS	Huntington, WV
G	23	Enjonae Chambers	5 ft 7 in (1.7 m)	So	Conway HS	Conaway, AR
G	24	Ashley Lambert	5 ft 11 in (1.8 m)	Jr	UMBC	Woodbridge, VA
C	33	Chukwuka Ezeigbo	6 ft 3 in (1.91 m)	Sr	Notre Dame HS	Trenton, NJ

Head coach

- Matt Daniel (Harding)

Assistant coach(es)

- Tony Kemper (Fort Hays State)
- Devrinn Paul (Kentucky State)
- Caronica Randle (Central Arkansas)

Legend

- (C) Team captain
- (S) Suspended
- (I) Ineligible
- (W) Walk-on
- Injured
- Current redshirt

Roster

== Schedule ==
Date time, TV	Rank^{#}	Opponent^{#}	Result	Record	Site (attendance) city, state
Regular season
11/14/2014*; 11:00 am		at Rhode Island; URI Tip-Off	W 61–45	1–0	Ryan Center (908); Kingston, RI
11/15/2014*; 12:30 pm		vs. Fairfield; URI Tip-Off	W 68–55	2–0	Ryan Center (N/A); Kingston, RI
11/22/2014*; 1:00 pm		Maryland Eastern Shore	W 74–57	3–0	Cam Henderson Center (447); Huntington, WV
11/26/2014*; 5:00 pm		at Cornell	L 49–58	3–1	Newman Arena (458); Ithaca, NY
11/29/2014*; 2:00 pm		at Coastal Carolina	W 77–65	4–1	HTC Center (316); Conway, SC
12/06/2014*; 4:00 pm		at Eastern Kentucky	L 58–63	4–2	Alumni Coliseum (175); Richmond, KY
12/10/2014*; 6:00 pm		Salem International	W 84–41	5–2	Cam Henderson Center (472); Huntington, WV
12/16/2014*; 6:00 pm		at Norfolk State	W 73–71	6–2	Joseph G. Echols Memorial Hall (165); Norfolk, VA
12/20/2014*; 4:00 pm		vs. No. 22 West Virginia; Chesapeake Energy Capital Classic	L 56–69	6–3	Charleston Civic Center (2,421); Charleston, WV
12/22/2014*; 1:00 pm		Brescia	W 127–56	7–3	Cam Henderson Center (312); Huntington, WV
12/29/2014*; 6:00 pm		Robert Morris	W 62–46	8–3	Cam Henderson Center (541); Huntington, WV
01/04/2015; 1:00 pm		WKU	L 53–67	8–4 (0–1)	Cam Henderson Center (681); Huntington, WV
01/08/2015; 7:00 pm		at Old Dominion	W 69–37	9–4 (1–1)	Ted Constant Convocation Center (1,808); Norfolk, VA
01/10/2015; 7:00 pm		at Charlotte	L 56–74	9–5 (1–2)	Dale F. Halton Arena (746); Charlotte, NC
01/15/2015; 6:00 pm		FIU	W 67–61	10–5 (2–2)	Cam Henderson Center (445); Huntington, WV
01/17/2015; 1:00 pm		Florida Atlantic	W 66–59	11–5 (3–2)	Cam Henderson Center (467); Huntington, WV
01/22/2015; 8:00 pm		at UTSA	L 48–60	11–6 (3–3)	Convocation Center (546); San Antonio, TX
01/24/2015; 4:00 pm		at UTEP	W 76–71	12–6 (4–3)	Don Haskins Center (1,744); El Paso, TX
01/29/2015; 6:00 pm		Southern Miss	W 67–65	13–6 (5–3)	Cam Henderson Center (454); Huntington, WV
01/31/2015; 1:00 pm		Louisiana Tech	L 67–68	13–7 (5–4)	Cam Henderson Center (643); Huntington, WV
02/05/2015; 7:00 pm		at Rice	W 72–69	14–7 (6–4)	Tudor Fieldhouse (218); Houston, TX
02/07/2015; 5:00 pm		at North Texas	L 42–45	14–8 (6–5)	The Super Pit (277); Denton, TX
02/14/2015; 1:00 pm, FSN		at WKU	L 60–74	14–9 (6–6)	E. A. Diddle Arena (1,419); Bowling Green, KY
02/19/2015; 1:00 pm		Middle Tennessee	L 48–74	14–10 (6–7)	Cam Henderson Center (531); Huntington, WV
02/21/2015; 1:00 pm		UAB	W 71–52	15–10 (7–7)	Cam Henderson Center (638); Huntington, WV
02/26/2015; 6:00 pm		at FIU	W 74–50	16–10 (8–7)	FIU Arena (296); Miami, FL
02/28/2015; 5:00 pm		at Florida Atlantic	L 73–83	16–11 (8–8)	FAU Arena (592); Boca Raton, FL
03/05/2015; 6:00 pm		Old Dominion	L 55–67	16–12 (8–9)	Cam Henderson Center (575); Huntington, WV
03/07/2015; 1:00 pm		Charlotte	L 58–66	16–13 (8–10)	Cam Henderson Center (805); Huntington, WV
Conference USA Tournament
03/11/2015; 6:00 pm, ASN	(9)	vs. (8) Charlotte; Quarterfinals	L 52–67	16–14	Bartow Arena (212); Birmingham, AL
WBI
03/19/2015*; 7:00 pm, ESPN3		at Northern Kentucky; First Round	W 81–79	17–14	The Bank of Kentucky Center (486); Highland Heights, KY
03/22/2015*; 3:00 pm, ESPN3		at Mercer; Quarterfinals	L 71–73	17–15	Hawkins Arena (1,227); Macon, GA
*Non-conference game. ^{#}Rankings from AP Poll. (#) Tournament seedings in parentheses. All times are in Eastern Time.

== See also ==
2014–15 Marshall Thundering Herd men's basketball team
