= 2014–15 UTSA Roadrunners women's basketball team =

Intercollegiate basketball season

2014–15 UTSA Roadrunners women's basketball
- Conference: Conference USA
- Record: 16–15 (11–7 C-USA)
- Head coach: Lubomyr Lichonczak (2nd season)
- Assistant coaches: Kristen Holt; Nicole Dunson
- Home arena: Convocation Center

2014–15 Conference USA women's basketball standings
	Conf.				Overall
Team	W		L	PCT	W		L	PCT
WKU †	16	–	2	.889	30	–	5	.857
Middle Tennessee	14	–	4	.778	24	–	10	.706
Southern Miss	13	–	5	.722	25	–	11	.694
Old Dominion	11	–	7	.611	21	–	13	.618
UAB	11	–	7	.611	18	–	13	.581
UTSA	11	–	7	.611	16	–	15	.516
Louisiana Tech	10	–	8	.556	16	–	15	.516
Charlotte	10	–	8	.556	15	–	17	.469
Marshall	8	–	10	.444	17	–	15	.531
Florida Atlantic	7	–	11	.389	13	–	17	.433
UTEP	7	–	11	.389	12	–	16	.429
Rice	4	–	14	.222	9	–	21	.300
North Texas	4	–	14	.222	5	–	24	.172
FIU	0	–	18	.000	3	–	26	.103
† 2015 C-USA tournament winner As of 29 March 2015; Rankings from AP poll

The 2014–15 UTSA Roadrunners women's basketball team represented the University of Texas at San Antonio during the 2014–15 NCAA Division I women's basketball season. The Roadrunners, led by second year head coach Lubomyr Lichonczak, played their home games at the Convocation Center and were second year members of Conference USA. They finished the season 16–15, 11–7 to finish in a three way tie for fourth place. They lost in the quarterfinals in the C-USA women's tournament to Old Dominion.

== Roster ==
2014–15 UTSA Roadrunners women's basketball team
Players
Coaches

Pos.	#	Name	Height	Year	Previous school	Hometown
G	1	Pearl Johnson	5 ft 6 in (1.68 m)	Jr	St. Petersburg College	Fruitland Park, FL
G/F	2	Mathilde Hergott	5 ft 10 in (1.78 m)	Jr	Lycee Jean Mermoz	Jonage, France
G	4	Crystal Chidomere	5 ft 11 in (1.8 m)	Fr	Bush HS	Richmond, TX
G	5	Alana Heard	5 ft 6 in (1.68 m)	So	Hightower HS	Missouri City, TX
G	10	Kamra King	5 ft 6 in (1.68 m)	Sr	Norman HS	Norman, OK
G/F	12	Niaga Mitchell-Cole	5 ft 10 in (1.78 m)	Jr	Roosevelt HS	San Antonio, TX
F	21	Akunna Elonu	5 ft 9 in (1.75 m)	Jr	Alief Elsik HS	Houston, TX
G	24	Ashley Spaletta	5 ft 9 in (1.75 m)	Sr	Magnolia HS	Magnolia, AR
F	25	Taylor Williams	6 ft 2 in (1.88 m)	So	Cinco Ranch HS	Katy, TX
C	30	Tesha Smith	6 ft 1 in (1.85 m)	So	Wagner HS	San Antonio, TX
G	31	Carlie Henieman	6 ft 0 in (1.83 m)	Fr	Brennan HS	San Antonio, TX
G	32	Dwanisha Tate	5 ft 9 in (1.75 m)	So	Seguin HS	Arlington, TX
F	33	Mannasha Bell	5 ft 11 in (1.8 m)	Jr	Northside HS	Fort Smith, AR
G/F	45	Haylee Beard	5 ft 9 in (1.75 m)	So	Ozark HS	Ozark, MO

Head coach

Lubomyr Lichonczak

Assistant coach(es)

Kristen Holt
Nicole Dunson

Legend

- (C) Team captain
- (S) Suspended
- (I) Ineligible
- (W) Walk-on
- Injured
- Current redshirt

Roster

== Schedule ==
Date time, TV	Rank^{#}	Opponent^{#}	Result	Record	Site (attendance) city, state
Regular Season
11/15/2014*; 2:00 pm, LHN		at No. 9 Texas	L 48–68	0–1	Frank Erwin Center (2,466); Austin, TX
11/19/2014*; 7:00 pm		Abilene Christian	W 70–57	1–1	Convocation Center (410); San Antonio, TX
11/23/2014*; 2:00 pm		at Lamar	W 72–40	2–1	Montagne Center (630); Beaumont, TX
11/28/2014*; 2:30 pm		Drake; UTSA Thanksgiving Classic	L 61–69	2–2	Convocation Center (600); San Antonio, TX
11/30/2014*; 4:30 pm		Incarnate Word; UTSA Thanksgiving Classic	W 57–31	3–2	Convocation Center (849); San Antonio, TX
12/02/2014*; 7:00 pm		at Texas–Arlington	W 63–55	4–2	College Park Center (913); Arlington, TX
12/04/2014*; 7:00 pm		Texas State; I-35 Rivalry	L 53–57	4–3	Convocation Center (417); San Antonio, TX
12/19/2014*; 3:00 pm		vs. Houston; Athletes in Action Tournament	L 53–56	4–4	United Supermarkets Arena (3958); Lubbock, TX
12/20/2014*; 2:00 pm		at Texas Tech; Athletes in Action Tournament	L 48–64	4–5	United Supermarkets Arena (4,434); Lubbock, TX
12/21/2014*; 11:00 am		vs. Nicholls State; Athletes in Action Tournament	L 49–57	4–6	United Supermarkets Arena (N/A); Lubbock, TX
12/28/2014*; 2:30 pm		South Dakota; UTSA Holiday Classic	L 69–76	4–7	Convocation Center (407); San Antonio, TX
12/29/2014*; 2:30 pm		SIU Edwardsville; UTSA Holiday Classic	W 75–60	5–7	Convocation Center (286); San Antonio, TX
01/02/2015; 7:00 pm		Rice	L 58–62 ^{OT}	5–8 (0–1)	Convocation Center (324); San Antonio, TX
01/04/2015; 2:00 pm		North Texas	W 53–45	6–8 (1–1)	Convocation Center (342); San Antonio, TX
01/08/2015; 6:00 pm		at Southern Miss	L 60–69	6–9 (1–2)	Reed Green Coliseum (1,052); Hattiesburg, MS
01/10/2015; 6:00 pm		at Louisiana Tech	L 74–79	6–10 (1–3)	Thomas Assembly Center (2,410); Ruston, LA
01/17/2015; 3:00 pm		at UTEP	W 55–53	7–10 (2–3)	Don Haskins Center (1,784); El Paso, TX
01/22/2015; 7:00 pm		Marshall	W 60–48	8–10 (3–3)	Convocation Center (546); San Antonio, TX
01/24/2015; 2:00 pm		No. 24 WKU	W 64–63	9–10 (4–3)	Convocation Center (672); San Antonio, TX
01/29/2015; 7:00 pm		at Middle Tennessee	L 53–73	9–11 (4–4)	Murphy Center (4,605); Murfreesboro, TN
01/31/2015; 2:00 pm		at UAB	L 57–73	9–12 (4–5)	Bartow Arena (422); Birmingham, AL
02/05/2015; 7:00 pm		FIU	W 74–56	10–12 (5–5)	Convocation Center (503); San Antonio, TX
02/08/2015; 11:00 am, FSN		Florida Atlantic	W 68–45	11–12 (6–5)	Convocation Center (512); San Antonio, TX
02/12/2015; 6:00 pm		at Old Dominion	W 52–51	12–12 (7–5)	Ted Constant Convocation Center (2,181); Norfolk, VA
02/14/2015; 6:00 pm		at Charlotte	L 54–74	12–13 (7–6)	Dale F. Halton Arena (642); Charlotte, NC
02/21/2015; 2:00 pm		UTEP	W 72–59	13–13 (8–6)	Convocation Center (610); San Antonio, TX
02/26/2015; 7:00 pm		Southern Miss	L 59–61	13–14 (8–7)	Convocation Center (645); San Antonio, TX
03/01/2015; 12:00 pm		Louisiana Tech; Postponed from 2/28	W 60–53	14–14 (9–7)	Convocation Center (676); San Antonio, TX
03/05/2015; 6:00 pm		at Rice	W 60–49	15–14 (10–7)	Tudor Fieldhouse (277); Houston, TX
03/07/2015; 4:00 pm		at North Texas	W 57–54	16–14 (11–7)	The Super Pit (354); Denton, TX
C-USA Tournament
03/12/2015; 7:30 pm, ASN		vs. Old Dominion; Quarterfinals	L 49–63	16–15	Bartow Arena (211); Birmingham, AL
*Non-conference game. ^{#}Rankings from AP Poll. (#) Tournament seedings in parentheses. All times are in Central Time.

== See also ==
- 2014–15 UTSA Roadrunners men's basketball team
