= 2014–15 FIU Panthers women's basketball team =

Intercollegiate basketball season

2014–15 FIU Panthers women's basketball
- Conference: Conference USA
- Record: 3–26 (0–18 C-USA)
- Head coach: Cindy Russo (16 games); Inge Nissen (13 games)
- Assistant coaches: Cristal Randolph; Lindsay Bowen
- Home arena: FIU Arena

2014–15 Conference USA women's basketball standings
	Conf.				Overall
Team	W		L	PCT	W		L	PCT
WKU †	16	–	2	.889	30	–	5	.857
Middle Tennessee	14	–	4	.778	24	–	10	.706
Southern Miss	13	–	5	.722	25	–	11	.694
Old Dominion	11	–	7	.611	21	–	13	.618
UAB	11	–	7	.611	18	–	13	.581
UTSA	11	–	7	.611	16	–	15	.516
Louisiana Tech	10	–	8	.556	16	–	15	.516
Charlotte	10	–	8	.556	15	–	17	.469
Marshall	8	–	10	.444	17	–	15	.531
Florida Atlantic	7	–	11	.389	13	–	17	.433
UTEP	7	–	11	.389	12	–	16	.429
Rice	4	–	14	.222	9	–	21	.300
North Texas	4	–	14	.222	5	–	24	.172
FIU	0	–	18	.000	3	–	26	.103
† 2015 C-USA tournament winner As of 29 March 2015; Rankings from AP poll

The 2014–15 FIU Panthers women's basketball team represented Florida International University during the 2014–15 NCAA Division I women's basketball season. The Panthers, led by thirty-fifth year head coach Cindy Russo, played their home games at FIU Arena, and were members of Conference USA. They finished the season 3–26, 0–18 in C-USA play to finish in last place. They failed to qualify for the Conference USA women's tournament.

== Roster ==
2014–15 FIU Panthers women's basketball team
Players
Coaches

Pos.	#	Name	Height	Year	Previous school	Hometown
G	1	Kiandre'a Pound	6 ft 0 in (1.83 m)	RS Fr	Sebastian River HS	Vero Beach, FL
G	2	Jade Cheek	5 ft 8 in (1.73 m)	Fr	Dr. Phillips HS	Orlando, FL
G/F	3	Zsofia Labady	5 ft 10 in (1.78 m)	Sr	Koch Valeria Koze Piskola	Pécs, Hungary
G	5	Taylor Shade	5 ft 6 in (1.68 m)	Jr	Boynton Beach Community HS	Boynton Beach, FL
G/F	10	Katrina Epnere	5 ft 10 in (1.78 m)	Jr	Riga State Gymnasium No.1	Riga, Latvia
F/C	12	Marita Davydova	6 ft 3 in (1.91 m)	Sr	Russian Agrarian University	Moscow, Russia
G	13	Janka Hegedus	6 ft 1 in (1.85 m)	So	Eotvos Jozsef HS	Budapest, Hungary
G	20	Aajah Hawkins	5 ft 7 in (1.7 m)	Fr	Pickerington Central HS	Pickerington, OH
G	21	Destini Feagin	5 ft 10 in (1.78 m)	Jr	Nzareth Regional HS/Gulf Coast State College	Philadelphia, PA
G	23	Nikolina Todorovic	5 ft 7 in (1.7 m)	So	Gymnasium Banja Luka	Bosnia and Herzegovina
G	24	Ciera Wheatley	5 ft 8 in (1.73 m)	Fr	Sickles HS	Tampa, FL
G	25	Amari Hawkins	5 ft 8 in (1.73 m)	Fr	Pickerington Central HS	Pickerington, OH
F	32	Tynia McKinzie	6 ft 0 in (1.83 m)	Sr	Lake Howell HS	Oviedo, FL
F	33	Brianna Wright	6 ft 2 in (1.88 m)	Jr	Titusville HS	Titusville, FL

Head coach

Cindy Russo

Assistant coach(es)

Inge Nissen
Cristal Randolph
Lindsay Bowen

Legend

- (C) Team captain
- (S) Suspended
- (I) Ineligible
- (W) Walk-on
- Injured
- Current redshirt

Roster

== Schedule ==
Date time, TV	Rank^{#}	Opponent^{#}	Result	Record	Site (attendance) city, state
Exhibition
11/02/2014*; 6:00 pm		Palm Beach Atlantic	W 73–46	–	FIU Arena (N/A); Miami, FL
11/07/2014*; 6:00 pm		Barry	W 60–57	–	FIU Arena (N/A); Miami, FL
Regular season
11/14/2014*; 5:30 pm		Tennessee Tech	L 56–73	0–1	FIU Arena (597); Miami, FL
11/18/2014*; 7:05 pm		at Florida Gulf Coast	L 49–97	0–2	Alico Arena (1,562); Fort Myers, FL
11/23/2014*; 2:00 pm		Cleveland State	L 65–73	0–3	FIU Arena (700); Miami, FL
11/28/2014*; 6:00 pm		Arizona; FIU Thanksgiving Classic	L 58–65	0–4	FIU Arena (436); Miami, FL
11/30/2014*; 2:00 pm		Virginia; FIU Thanksgiving Classic	L 61–74	0–5	FIU Arena (305); Miami, FL
12/06/2014*; 6:00 pm		UCF	W 66–57	1–5	FIU Arena (329); Miami, FL
12/14/2014*; 2:00 pm		at Jacksonville	L 64–76	1–6	Swisher Gymnasium (201); Jacksonville, FL
12/20/2014*; 1:00 pm		vs. Western Carolina; UNF Hampton Inn Oceanfront Holiday Classic	L 69–83	1–7	UNF Arena (474); Jacksonville, FL
12/21/2014*; 1:00 pm		vs. Wofford; UNF Hampton Inn Oceanfront Holiday Classic	W 83–75	2–7	UNF Arena (389); Jacksonville, FL
12/29/2014*; 6:00 pm		Auburn; FIU Sun & Fun Classic semifinals	L 44–81	2–8	FIU Arena (352); Miami, FL
12/30/2014*; 6:00 pm		Bowling Green; FIU Sun & Fun Classic 3rd place game	W 68–55	3–8	FIU Arena (322); Miami, FL
01/04/2015; 6:00 pm		Florida Atlantic	L 63–79	3–9 (0–1)	FIU Arena (253); Miami, FL
01/08/2015; 6:00 pm		Middle Tennessee	L 60–75	3–10 (0–2)	FIU Arena (N/A); Miami, FL
01/11/2015; 12:00 pm, FSN		UAB	L 45–68	3–11 (0–3)	FIU Arena (389); Miami, FL
01/15/2015; 6:00 pm		at Marshall	L 61–67	3–12 (0–4)	Cam Henderson Center (445); Huntington, WV
01/17/2015; 3:00 pm		at WKU	L 42–81	3–13 (0–5)	E. A. Diddle Arena (1,472); Bowling Green, KY
01/24/2015; 5:00 pm		at Florida Atlantic	L 63–77	3–14 (0–6)	FAU Arena (836); Boca Raton, FL
01/29/2015; 6:00 pm		Old Dominion	L 67–80	3–15 (0–7)	FIU Arena (N/A); Miami, FL
01/31/2015; 6:00 pm		Charlotte	L 62–81	3–16 (0–8)	FIU Arena (401); Miami, FL
02/05/2015; 8:00 pm		at UTSA	L 56–74	3–17 (0–9)	Convocation Center (503); San Antonio, TX
02/07/2015; 4:00 pm		at UTEP	L 56–72	3–18 (0–10)	Don Haskins Center (1,902); El Paso, TX
02/12/2015; 6:00 pm		Southern Miss	L 65–78	3–19 (0–11)	FIU Arena (234); Miami, FL
02/14/2015; 6:00 pm		Louisiana Tech	L 56–79	3–20 (0–12)	FIU Arena (N/A); Miami, FL
02/19/2015; 7:00 pm		at Rice	L 59–80	3–21 (0–13)	Tudor Fieldhouse (130); Houston, TX
02/21/2015; 5:00 pm		at North Texas	L 61–77	3–22 (0–14)	UNT Coliseum (764); Denton, TX
02/26/2015; 2:00 pm		Marshall	L 50–74	3–23 (0–15)	FIU Arena (296); Miami, FL
02/28/2015; 6:00 pm		WKU	L 47–88	3–24 (0–16)	FIU Arena (356); Miami, FL
03/05/2015; 9:00 pm		at Middle Tennessee	L 30–79	3–25 (0–17)	Murphy Center (3,605); Murfreesboro, TN
03/07/2015; 3:00 pm		at UAB	L 56–72	3–26 (0–18)	Bartow Arena (472); Birmingham, AL
*Non-conference game. ^{#}Rankings from AP Poll. (#) Tournament seedings in parentheses. All times are in Eastern Time.

== See also ==
- 2014–15 FIU Panthers men's basketball team
