= 2014–15 Western Kentucky Lady Toppers basketball team =

Intercollegiate basketball season

2014–15 Western Kentucky Lady Toppers basketball

Conference USA Regular Season & Tournament Champions

NCAA Women's Tournament, first round
- Conference: Conference USA
- Record: 30–5 (16–2 C-USA)
- Head coach: Michelle Clark-Heard (2nd season)
- Assistant coaches: Margaret Richards; Greg Collins; Candyce Bingham
- Home arena: E. A. Diddle Arena

2014–15 Conference USA women's basketball standings
	Conf.				Overall
Team	W		L	PCT	W		L	PCT
WKU †	16	–	2	.889	30	–	5	.857
Middle Tennessee	14	–	4	.778	24	–	10	.706
Southern Miss	13	–	5	.722	25	–	11	.694
Old Dominion	11	–	7	.611	21	–	13	.618
UAB	11	–	7	.611	18	–	13	.581
UTSA	11	–	7	.611	16	–	15	.516
Louisiana Tech	10	–	8	.556	16	–	15	.516
Charlotte	10	–	8	.556	15	–	17	.469
Marshall	8	–	10	.444	17	–	15	.531
Florida Atlantic	7	–	11	.389	13	–	17	.433
UTEP	7	–	11	.389	12	–	16	.429
Rice	4	–	14	.222	9	–	21	.300
North Texas	4	–	14	.222	5	–	24	.172
FIU	0	–	18	.000	3	–	26	.103
† 2015 C-USA tournament winner As of 29 March 2015; Rankings from AP poll

The 2014–15 WKU Lady Toppers basketball team represented Western Kentucky University during the 2014–15 NCAA Division I women's basketball season. The Lady Toppers were led by second year head coach Michelle Clark-Heard. They played their home games at E. A. Diddle Arena and were first year members of Conference USA. They finished the season 30–5, 16–2 in C-USA play to win the Conference USA regular season and also won the Conference USA Tournament. They received an automatic bid to the NCAA women's basketball tournament, where they were defeated by Texas in the first round.

== Roster ==
2014–15 WKU Lady Toppers women's basketball team
Players
Coaches

Pos.	#	Name	Height	Year	Previous school	Hometown
G	5	Micah Jones	5 ft 8 in (1.73 m)	So	Green County HS	Greensburg, Ky.
F	10	Tashia Brown	6 ft 1 in (1.85 m)	So	Lowndes HS	Lake Park, Ga.
F/C	11	Bria Gaines	6 ft 3 in (1.91 m)	So	Bloom Township HS	Glenwood, Ill.
G	12	Kendall Noble	5 ft 11 in (1.8 m)	RS So	Perry County Central HS	Hazard, Ky.
F	13	Aleeya Harris	6 ft 0 in (1.83 m)	RS Fr	John Jay HS	San Antonio, Texas
G	14	Kierra Muhammad	5 ft 4 in (1.63 m)	So	Paul Laurence Dunbar HS	Lexington, Ky.
C	15	Ruta Savickaite	6 ft 4 in (1.93 m)	So	Hamilton Heights Christian Academy	Vinius, Lithuania
G/F	21	Alexis Govan	5 ft 10 in (1.78 m)	Jr	Stevens HS	San Antonio, Texas
F	23	Ivy Brown	6 ft 1 in (1.85 m)	Fr	LaRue County HS	Hodgenville. Ky.
G	24	Ileana Johnson	5 ft 6 in (1.68 m)	Sr	Flagstaff HS	Flagstaff, Ariz.
F	30	Chastity Gooch	6 ft 0 in (1.83 m)	Sr	Franklin-Simpson HS	Franklin, Ky.
F	33	Jalynn McClain	6 ft 0 in (1.83 m)	Jr	Jefferson	Jeffersonville, Ind.
F	34	Jaiveonna Norris	6 ft 0 in (1.83 m)	Fr	Homewood-Flossmoor HS	Chicago Heights, Ill.

Head coach

Michelle Clark-Heard

Assistant coach(es)

Margaret Richards
Greg Collins
Candyce Bingham

Legend

- (C) Team captain
- (S) Suspended
- (I) Ineligible
- (W) Walk-on
- Injured
- Current redshirt

Roster
Last update: 2013-10-05

== Schedule ==
Date time, TV	Rank^{#}	Opponent^{#}	Result	Record	Site (attendance) city, state
Exhibition
11/10/2014*; 7:00 pm		Bellarmine	W 102–55	–	E. A. Diddle Arena (N/A); Bowling Green, KY
Regular season
11/15/2014*; 7:00 pm		Central Arkansas; Preseason WNIT First Round	W 93–57	1–0	E. A. Diddle Arena (1,341); Bowling Green, KY
11/17/2014*; 8:00 pm		at Colorado; Preseason WNIT Second Round	W 79–78	2–0	Coors Events Center (1,550); Boulder, CO
11/20/2014*; 7:00 pm		Albany; Preseason WNIT Semifinals	W 63–54	3–0	E. A. Diddle Arena (1,296); Bowling Green, KY
11/23/2014*; 2:00 pm, CBSSN		at Mississippi State; Preseason WNIT Championship Game	L 77–88	3–1	Humphrey Coliseum (3,773); Starkville, MS
11/25/2014*; 6:00 pm, ESPN3		at No. 12 Louisville	L 67–89	3–2	KFC Yum! Center (8,463); Louisville, KY
11/28/2014*; 11:00 am		vs. Tulane; Hofstra Tournament semifinals	W 69–64	4–2	Hofstra Arena (N/A); Hempstead, NY
11/29/2014*; 3:00 pm		at Hofstra; Hofstra Tournament championship	W 70–65 ^{OT}	5–2	Hofstra Arena (204); Hempstead, NY
12/01/2014*; 7:00 pm		Alabama A&M; BB&T Classic	W 96–44	6–2	E. A. Diddle Arena (1,064); Bowling Green, KY
12/04/2014*; 7:00 pm, ASN		Ole Miss	W 98–69	7–2	E. A. Diddle Arena (1,396); Bowling Green, KY
12/06/2014*; 2:00 pm		Alabama State	W 93–54	8–2	E. A. Diddle Arena (1,023); Bowling Green, KY
12/16/2014*; 6:00 pm		at Austin Peay	W 91–68	9–2	Dunn Center (433); Clarksville, TN
12/21/2014*; 2:00 pm, FCS/WKYU		Ball State	W 84–59	10–2	E. A. Diddle Arena (1,114); Bowling Green, KY
12/29/2014*; 6:00 pm		at Belmont	W 66–50	11–2	Curb Event Center (459); Nashville, TN
01/04/2015; 12:00 pm		at Marshall	W 67–53	12–2 (1–0)	Cam Henderson Center (681); Huntington, WV
01/08/2015; 6:00 pm	No. 25	at Charlotte	W 76–61	13–2 (2–0)	Dale F. Halton Arena (537); Charlotte, NC
01/10/2015; 1:00 pm	No. 25	at Old Dominion	W 76–60	14–2 (3–0)	Ted Constant Convocation Center (2,188); Norfolk, VA
01/15/2015; 11:00 am, FCS/WKYU		Florida Atlantic	W 80–43	15–2 (4–0)	E. A. Diddle Arena (4,733); Bowling Green, KY
01/17/2015; 2:00 pm, FCS/WKYU		FIU	W 81–42	16–2 (5–0)	E. A. Diddle Arena (1,472); Bowling Green, KY
01/22/2015; 8:00 pm	No. 24	at UTEP	W 80–74	17–2 (6–0)	Don Haskins Center (1,404); El Paso, TX
01/24/2015; 2:00 pm	No. 24	at UTSA	L 63–64	17–3 (6–1)	Convocation Center (672); San Antonio, TX
01/29/2015; 7:00 pm, FCS/WKYU		Louisiana Tech	W 82–66	18–3 (7–1)	E. A. Diddle Arena (3,144); Bowling Green, KY
01/31/2015; 2:00 pm		Southern Miss	L 61–63	18–4 (7–2)	E. A. Diddle Arena (1,766); Bowling Green, KY
02/05/2015; 7:00 pm		at North Texas	W 77–49	19–4 (8–2)	The Super Pit (437); Denton, TX
02/07/2015; 2:00 pm		at Rice	W 83–76	20–4 (9–2)	Tudor Fieldhouse (547); Houston, TX
02/14/2015; 1:00 pm, FSN		Marshall	W 74–60	21–4 (10–2)	E. A. Diddle Arena (1,419); Bowling Green, KY
02/19/2015; 7:00 pm		UAB	W 59–51	22–4 (11–2)	E. A. Diddle Arena (1,208); Bowling Green, KY
02/21/2015; 2:00 pm, FCS/WKYU		Middle Tennessee	W 63–60	23–4 (12–2)	E. A. Diddle Arena (3,023); Bowling Green, KY
02/26/2015; 6:00 pm		at Florida Atlantic	W 85–74	24–4 (13–2)	FAU Arena (603); Boca Raton, FL
02/28/2015; 5:00 pm		at FIU	W 88–47	25–4 (14–2)	FIU Arena (356); Miami, FL
03/05/2015; 7:00 pm		Charlotte	W 80–72	26–4 (15–2)	E. A. Diddle Arena (1,873); Bowling Green, KY
03/07/2015; 2:00 pm		Old Dominion	W 71–62	27–4 (16–2)	E. A. Diddle Arena (3,102); Bowling Green, KY
C-USA Tournament
03/12/2015; 5:00 pm, ASN		vs. Charlotte; Quarterfinals	W 70–67	28–4	Bartow Arena (357); Birmingham, AL
03/13/2015; 12:30 pm, CBSSN		vs. Old Dominion; Semifinals	W 61–59	29–4	Birmingham–Jefferson Convention Complex (N/A); Birmingham, AL
03/14/2015; 7:00 pm, CBSSN		vs. Southern Miss; Championship Game	W 60–57	30–4	Birmingham–Jefferson Convention Complex (N/A); Birmingham, AL
NCAA Women's Tournament
03/20/2015*; 4:20 pm, ESPN2		vs. Texas; First Round	L 64–66	30–5	Haas Pavilion (N/A); Berkeley, CA
*Non-conference game. ^{#}Rankings from AP Poll. (#) Tournament seedings in parentheses. All times are in Central Time.

== Rankings ==
Ranking movement Legend: ██ Increase in ranking. ██ Decrease in ranking. NR = Not ranked. RV = Received votes.
Poll	Pre	Wk 2	Wk 3	Wk 4	Wk 5	Wk 6	Wk 7	Wk 8	Wk 9	Wk 10	Wk 11	Wk 12	Wk 13	Wk 14	Wk 15	Wk 16	Wk 17	Wk 18	Final
AP	RV	RV	RV	RV	RV	RV	RV	RV	25	RV	24	RV	NR	NR	RV	RV	RV	RV	RV
Coaches	RV	RV	RV	RV	RV	NR	NR	RV	RV	RV	RV	RV	RV	RV	RV	RV	RV	RV	RV

== See also ==
2014–15 WKU Hilltoppers basketball team
