= 2014–15 Charlotte 49ers women's basketball team =

Intercollegiate basketball season

2014–15 Charlotte 49ers women's basketball
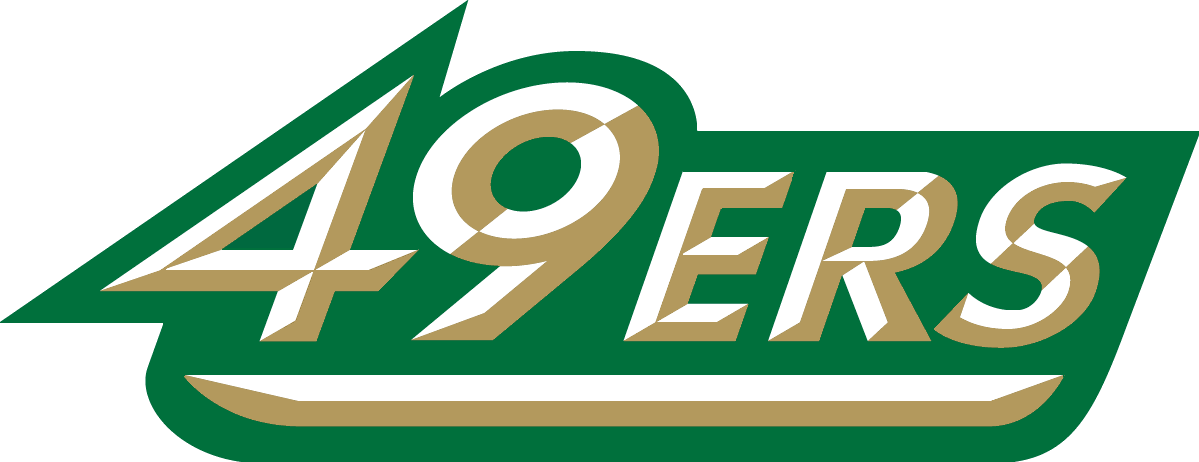
- Conference: Conference USA
- Record: 15–17 (10–8 C-USA)
- Head coach: Cara Consuegra (3rd season)
- Assistant coaches: Karen Lange; Joanne Aluka-White; Nicole Woods
- Home arena: Dale F. Halton Arena

2014–15 Conference USA women's basketball standings
	Conf.				Overall
Team	W		L	PCT	W		L	PCT
WKU †	16	–	2	.889	30	–	5	.857
Middle Tennessee	14	–	4	.778	24	–	10	.706
Southern Miss	13	–	5	.722	25	–	11	.694
Old Dominion	11	–	7	.611	21	–	13	.618
UAB	11	–	7	.611	18	–	13	.581
UTSA	11	–	7	.611	16	–	15	.516
Louisiana Tech	10	–	8	.556	16	–	15	.516
Charlotte	10	–	8	.556	15	–	17	.469
Marshall	8	–	10	.444	17	–	15	.531
Florida Atlantic	7	–	11	.389	13	–	17	.433
UTEP	7	–	11	.389	12	–	16	.429
Rice	4	–	14	.222	9	–	21	.300
North Texas	4	–	14	.222	5	–	24	.172
FIU	0	–	18	.000	3	–	26	.103
† 2015 C-USA tournament winner As of 29 March 2015; Rankings from AP poll

The 2014–15 Charlotte 49ers women's basketball team represented the University of North Carolina at Charlotte during the 2014–15 NCAA Division I women's basketball season. The 49ers, led by third year head coach Cara Consuegra, played their home games at Dale F. Halton Arena and were members of Conference USA. They finished the season 15–17, 10–8 in C-USA play to finish in a tie for seventh place. They advanced to the quarterfinals of the C-USA women's tournament, where they lost to WKU.

== Roster ==
2014–15 Charlotte 49ers women's basketball team
Players
Coaches

Pos.	#	Name	Height	Year	Previous school	Hometown
G	0	Amaya Ransom	5 ft 11 in (1.8 m)	Fr	Landstown	Virginia Beach, VA
G	1	Ciara Gregory	5 ft 7 in (1.7 m)	So	Jeannette	Jeannette, PA
F	2	Mintrell McKoy	6 ft 3 in (1.91 m)	Fr	Jack Britt	Fayetteville, NC
G	3	Ayanna Holmes	5 ft 7 in (1.7 m)	Sr	Salisbury	Salisbury, NC
F	5	Meme Garner	6 ft 0 in (1.83 m)	So	Jordan-Matthews	Siler City, NC
G	11	Griffin Dempsey	5 ft 6 in (1.68 m)	Fr	St. Joseph Central Catholic	Huntington, WV
F	20	Kira Gordon	6 ft 0 in (1.83 m)	Jr	Kennesaw Mountain	Kennesaw, GA
G	21	Lefty Webster	5 ft 8 in (1.73 m)	So	Norfolk Christian	Norfolk, VA
G	22	Hillary Sigmon	6 ft 0 in (1.83 m)	Sr	Hickory	Hickory, NC
F	23	Kenya Olley	6 ft 3 in (1.91 m)	So	Dorman	Spartanburg, SC
F	32	Alexis Alexander	6 ft 1 in (1.85 m)	Jr	Alpharetta	Atlanta, GA
G	33	Tanisha Brown	5 ft 11 in (1.8 m)	So	Myrtle Beach	Loris, SC
F	50	Olivia Rankin	6 ft 2 in (1.88 m)	Sr	Salisbury	Salisbury, NC

Head coach

Cara Consuegra

Assistant coach(es)

Karen Lange
Joanne Aluka-White
Nicole Woods

Legend

- (C) Team captain
- (S) Suspended
- (I) Ineligible
- (W) Walk-on
- Injured
- Current redshirt

Roster

== Rankings ==
Regular season polls
Poll	Pre- Season	Week 2	Week 3	Week 4	Week 5	Week 6	Week 7	Week 8	Week 9	Week 10	Week 11	Week 12	Week 13	Week 14	Week 15	Week 16	Week 17	Week 18	Week 19	Final
AP																				
Coaches																				

Legend
	Increase in ranking
	Decrease in ranking
	No change
(RV)	Received votes

== Schedule ==
Date time, TV	Rank^{#}	Opponent^{#}	Result	Record	Site (attendance) city, state
Exhibition
11/05/2014*; 7:00 pm		Catawba	W 93–64	–	Dale F. Halton Arena (453); Charlotte, NC
Regular season
11/14/2014*; 6:00 pm, ESPN3		at Liberty	W 79–77	1–0	Vines Center (4,352); Lynchburg, VA
11/18/2014*; 7:00 pm		NC State	L 63–70	1–1	Dale F. Halton Arena (1,592); Charlotte, NC
11/21/2014*; 7:00 pm		Elon	L 54–67	1–2	Dale F. Halton Arena (1,252); Charlotte, NC
11/27/2014*; 5:00 pm		vs. Montana; Cancún Challenge Mayan Division	L 58–67	1–3	Hard Rock Resort (650); Playa del Carmen, MX
11/28/2014*; 8:30 pm		vs. Wake Forest; Cancún Challenge Mayan Division	L 58–65	1–4	Hard Rock Resort (650); Playa del Carmen, MX
11/29/2014*; 8:30 pm		vs. Princeton; Cancún Challenge Mayan Division	L 43–73	1–5	Hard Rock Resort (650); Playa del Carmen, MX
12/04/2014*; 8:00 pm, SECN		at No. 1 South Carolina	L 61–82	1–6	Colonial Life Arena (9,629); Columbia, SC
12/07/2014*; 2:00 pm		Charleston Southern	W 75–43	2–6	Dale F. Halton Arena (729); Charlotte, NC
12/15/2014*; 7:00 pm		at Ball State	L 66–76	2–7	John E. Worthen Arena (1,479); Muncie, IN
12/18/2014*; 12:00 pm		Presbyterian	W 66–50	3–7	Dale F. Halton Arena (5,150); Charlotte, NC
12/21/2014*; 2:00 pm		Davidson	W 86–51	4–7	Dale F. Halton Arena (1,089); Charlotte, NC
12/29/2014*; 9:00 pm		at Utah	L 52–54	4–8	Jon M. Huntsman Center (645); Salt Lake City, UT
01/04/2015; 2:00 pm		at Old Dominion	L 57–66	4–9 (0–1)	Ted Constant Convocation Center (3,240); Norfolk, VA
01/08/2015; 7:00 pm		No. 25 WKU	L 61–76	4–10 (0–2)	Dale F. Halton Arena (537); Charlotte, NC
01/10/2015; 7:00 pm		Marshall	W 74–56	5–10 (1–2)	Dale F. Halton Arena (746); Charlotte, NC
01/15/2015; 8:00 pm		at North Texas	W 67–58	6–10 (2–2)	The Super Pit (490); Denton, TX
01/17/2015; 3:00 pm		at Rice	W 62–59	7–10 (3–2)	Tudor Fieldhouse (337); Houston, TX
01/22/2015; 7:00 pm		UAB	L 52–60	7–11 (3–3)	Dale F. Halton Arena (852); Charlotte, NC
01/24/2015; 12:00 pm, FSN		Middle Tennessee	L 54–84	7–12 (3–4)	Dale F. Halton Arena (768); Charlotte, NC
01/29/2015; 7:00 pm		at Florida Atlantic	L 68–71	7–13 (3–5)	FAU Arena (625); Boca Raton, FL
01/31/2015; 6:00 pm		at FIU	W 81–62	8–13 (4–5)	FIU Arena (401); Miami, FL
02/07/2015; 7:00 pm		Old Dominion	W 82–67	9–13 (5–5)	Dale F. Halton Arena (905); Charlotte, NC
02/12/2015; 7:00 pm		UTEP	L 72–75	9–14 (5–6)	Dale F. Halton Arena (588); Charlotte, NC
02/14/2015; 7:00 pm		UTSA	W 74–54	10–14 (6–6)	Dale F. Halton Arena (642); Charlotte, NC
02/19/2015; 7:30 pm		at Louisiana Tech	L 61–71	10–15 (6–7)	Thomas Assembly Center (1,719); Ruston, LA
02/21/2015; 5:00 pm		at Southern Miss	W 83–72	11–15 (7–7)	Reed Green Coliseum (1,732); Hattiesburg, MS
02/26/2015; 7:00 pm		North Texas	W 71–46	12–15 (8–7)	Dale F. Halton Arena (562); Charlotte, NC
02/28/2015; 7:00 pm		Rice	W 74–59	13–15 (9–7)	Dale F. Halton Arena (858); Charlotte, NC
03/05/2015; 8:00 pm		at WKU	L 72–80	13–16 (9–8)	E. A. Diddle Arena (1,873); Bowling Green, KY
03/07/2015; 1:00 pm		at Marshall	W 66–58	14–16 (10–8)	Cam Henderson Center (805); Huntington, WV
Conference USA Tournament
03/11/2015; 6:00 pm, ASN		vs. Marshall; First Round	W 67–52	15–16	Bartow Arena (212); Birmingham, AL
03/12/2015; 6:00 pm, ASN		vs. WKU; Quarterfinals	L 67–70	15–17	Bartow Arena (357); Birmingham, AL
*Non-conference game. ^{#}Rankings from AP Poll. (#) Tournament seedings in parentheses. All times are in Eastern Time.

== See also ==
- 2014–15 Charlotte 49ers men's basketball team
