= 2015 Conference USA women's basketball tournament =

- Classification: Division I
- Season: 2014–15
- Teams: 12
- Site: Birmingham–Jefferson Convention Complex; Bartow Arena; Birmingham, Alabama
- Champions: WKU (1st title)
- Winning coach: Michelle Clark-Heard (1st title)
- MVP: Alexis Govan (WKU)
- Television: ASN, CBSSN

2014–15 Conference USA women's basketball standings
	Conf.				Overall
Team	W		L	PCT	W		L	PCT
WKU †	16	–	2	.889	30	–	5	.857
Middle Tennessee	14	–	4	.778	24	–	10	.706
Southern Miss	13	–	5	.722	25	–	11	.694
Old Dominion	11	–	7	.611	21	–	13	.618
UAB	11	–	7	.611	18	–	13	.581
UTSA	11	–	7	.611	16	–	15	.516
Louisiana Tech	10	–	8	.556	16	–	15	.516
Charlotte	10	–	8	.556	15	–	17	.469
Marshall	8	–	10	.444	17	–	15	.531
Florida Atlantic	7	–	11	.389	13	–	17	.433
UTEP	7	–	11	.389	12	–	16	.429
Rice	4	–	14	.222	9	–	21	.300
North Texas	4	–	14	.222	5	–	24	.172
FIU	0	–	18	.000	3	–	26	.103
† 2015 C-USA tournament winner As of 29 March 2015; Rankings from AP poll

The 2015 Conference USA women's basketball tournament was a postseason women's basketball tournament for Conference USA was held March 11–14 in Birmingham, Alabama. The first two rounds took place at Bartow Arena while the semifinals and championship took place at Birmingham–Jefferson Convention Complex.

== Seeds ==
The top twelve teams qualified for the tournament. Teams were seeded by record within the conference, with a tiebreaker system to seed teams with identical conference records.

Seed	School	Conference	Overall	Tiebreaker
1	Western Kentucky	16-2	27-4	
2	Middle Tennessee	14-4	20-8	
3	Southern Miss	13-5	20-9	
4	UT-San Antonio	11-7	16-14	1-0 vs. ODU, 0-1 vs. UAB, 1-0 vs. WKU
5	Old Dominion	11-7	18-11	1-0 vs. UAB, 0-1 vs. UTSA, 0-2 vs. WKU
6	UAB	11-7	17-12	0-1 vs. ODU, 1-0 vs. UTSA, 0-1 vs. WKU
7	Louisiana Tech	10-8	15-14	1-0 vs. Charlotte
8	Charlotte	10-8	14-16	0-1 vs. Louisiana Tech
9	Marshall	8-10	16-13	
10	Florida Atlantic	7-11	13-16	1-0 vs. UTEP
11	UTEP	7-11	12-15	0-1 vs. Florida Atlantic
12	Rice	4-14	8-20	
‡ – C–USA regular season champions, and tournament No. 1 seed. † – Received a double–bye in the conference tournament. # – Received a single–bye in the conference tournament. Overall records include all games played in the C–USA Tournament.

Eliminated from Conference tournament: North Texas (4-14), FIU (0-18)

== Schedule ==
Session	Game	Time*	Matchup^{#}	Television	Attendance
First round – Wednesday, March 11
1	1	11:00 am	#11 UTEP vs #6 UAB	ASN	787
1	2	1:30 pm	#10 Florida Atlantic vs #7 Louisiana Tech	ASN	284
2	3	5:00 pm	#9 Marshall vs #8 Charlotte	ASN	212
2	4	7:30 pm	#12 Rice vs #5 Old Dominion	ASN	313
Quarterfinals – Thursday, March 12
3	5	11:00 am	#3 Southern Miss vs #6 UAB	ASN	888
3	6	1:30 pm	#2 Middle Tennessee vs #7 Louisiana Tech	ASN	632
4	7	5:00 pm	#1 Western Kentucky vs #8 Charlotte	ASN	357
4	8	7:30 pm	#4 UT-San Antonio vs #5 Old Dominion	ASN	211
Semifinals – Friday, March 13
5	9	10:00 am	#3 Southern Miss vs #2 Middle Tennessee	CBSSN	
5	10	12:30 pm	#1 Western Kentucky vs #5 Old Dominion	CBSSN	
Championship – Saturday, March 14
6	11	7:00 pm	#3 Southern Miss vs. #1 Western Kentucky	CBSSN	
*Game times in CT. #-Rankings denote tournament seed

== Bracket ==
First round Wednesday, March 11; ASN
8	Charlotte	67
9	Marshall	52
5	Old Dominion	62
12	Rice	57
7	Louisiana Tech	84
10	Florida Atlantic	74
6	UAB	63
11	UTEP	52

Quarterfinals; Thursday, March 12; ASN
1	Western Kentucky	70
8	Charlotte	67
4	UTSA	49
5	Old Dominion	63
2	Middle Tennessee	77
7	Louisiana Tech	58
3	Southern Miss	80
6	UAB	66

Semifinals; Friday, March 13; CBSSN
1	Western Kentucky	61
5	Old Dominion	59
2	Middle Tennessee	53
3	Southern Miss	65

Championship game Saturday, March 14; CBSSN
3	Southern Miss	57
1	Western Kentucky	60

All times listed are Central

== See also ==
- 2015 Conference USA men's basketball tournament
