= 2014–15 North Texas Mean Green women's basketball team =

American college basketball season

2014–15 North Texas Mean Green women's basketball
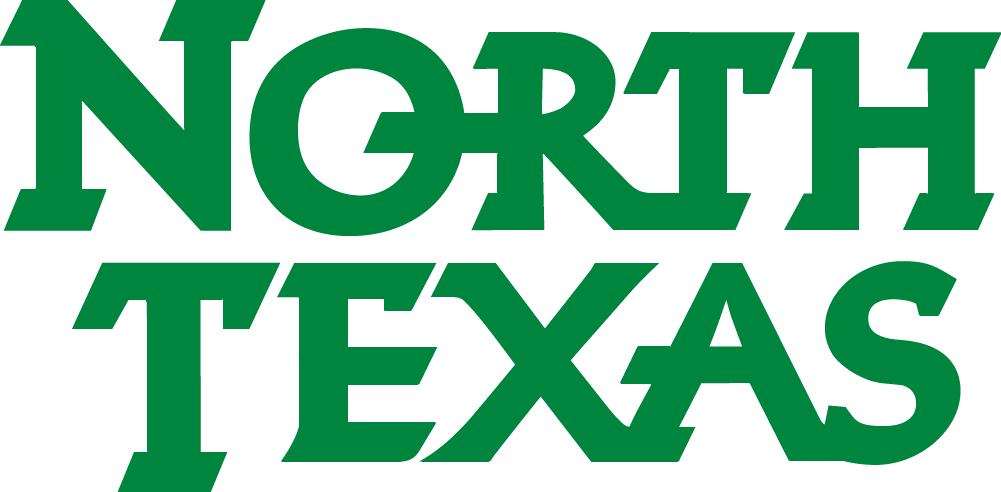
- Conference: Conference USA
- Record: 5–24 (4–14 C-USA)
- Head coach: Mike Petersen (3rd season)
- Assistant coaches: Ashley Davis (3rd season); Karen Blair (2nd season); Wesley Brooks (4th season)
- Home arena: The Super Pit

2014–15 Conference USA women's basketball standings
	Conf.				Overall
Team	W		L	PCT	W		L	PCT
WKU †	16	–	2	.889	30	–	5	.857
Middle Tennessee	14	–	4	.778	24	–	10	.706
Southern Miss	13	–	5	.722	25	–	11	.694
Old Dominion	11	–	7	.611	21	–	13	.618
UAB	11	–	7	.611	18	–	13	.581
UTSA	11	–	7	.611	16	–	15	.516
Louisiana Tech	10	–	8	.556	16	–	15	.516
Charlotte	10	–	8	.556	15	–	17	.469
Marshall	8	–	10	.444	17	–	15	.531
Florida Atlantic	7	–	11	.389	13	–	17	.433
UTEP	7	–	11	.389	12	–	16	.429
Rice	4	–	14	.222	9	–	21	.300
North Texas	4	–	14	.222	5	–	24	.172
FIU	0	–	18	.000	3	–	26	.103
† 2015 C-USA tournament winner As of 29 March 2015; Rankings from AP poll

The 2014–15 North Texas Mean Green women's basketball team represented the University of North Texas during the 2014–15 NCAA Division I women's basketball season. The Mean Green, led by third year head coach Mike Petersen, played their home games UNT Coliseum, also known as The Super Pit, and were second year members of Conference USA. They finished the season 5–24, 4–14 in C-USA play to finish in a tie for twelfth place. They failed to qualify for the Conference USA women's tournament.

== Roster ==
2014–15 North Texas Mean Green women's basketball team
Players
Coaches

Pos.	#	Name	Height	Year	Previous school	Hometown
G	2	Teadra Jones	5 ft 9 in (1.75 m)	Jr	Pensacola SC	Pensacola, FL
F	3	Briesha Wynn	6 ft 0 in (1.83 m)	Sr	TCU	Fort Worth, TX
F	5	Eboniey Jeter	6 ft 0 in (1.83 m)	RS So	Harker Heights HS	Killeen, TX
G	10	Kasiney Williams	5 ft 1 in (1.55 m)	Jr	Baton Rouge CC	Baton Rouge, LA
G	14	Candice Adams	5 ft 8 in (1.73 m)	So	Cedar Hill HS	Cedar Hill, TX
G	20	Terra Ellison	5 ft 11 in (1.8 m)	So	The Colony HS	The Colony, TX
F	21	Joh'Vonna Darrington	6 ft 1 in (1.85 m)	Sr	Weatherford CC	Oklahoma City, OK
G	22	BreAnna Dawkins	5 ft 6 in (1.68 m)	Sr	Wichita State	Cedar Hill, TX
F	23	Acheil Tac	6 ft 2 in (1.88 m)	Jr	Sachse HS	Garland, TX
F	24	Bria Frierson	6 ft 0 in (1.83 m)	Fr	Frisco Liberty HS	Cincinnati, OH
F	32	Megan Womack	6 ft 2 in (1.88 m)	Fr	Stroud HS	Stroud, OK
G	34	Kiara Davis	5 ft 10 in (1.78 m)	RS So	North Crowley HS	Fort Worth, TX

Head coach

- Mike Petersen

Assistant coach(es)

- Ashley Davis
- Karen Blair
- Wesley Brooks

Legend

- (C) Team captain
- (S) Suspended
- (I) Ineligible
- (W) Walk-on
- Injured
- Current redshirt

Roster

== Schedule ==
Date time, TV	Rank^{#}	Opponent^{#}	Result	Record	Site (attendance) city, state
Exhibition
11/06/2014*; 6:00 pm		Southern Arkansas	W 75–74 ^{OT}	–	The Super Pit (N/A); Denton, TX
Regular Season
11/14/2014*; 7:00 pm		Houston	L 42–46	0–1	The Super Pit (1,142); Denton, TX
11/17/2014*; 11:30 am		Northern Colorado	L 48–53	0–2	The Super Pit (2,947); Denton, TX
11/21/2014*; 7:00 pm		Massachusetts; Hospitality Hill Challenge	L 46–56	0–3	The Super Pit (827); Denton, TX
11/23/2014*; 2:00 pm		Eastern Illinois; Hospitality Hill Challenge	L 57–59 ^{OT}	0–4	The Super Pit (619); Denton, TX
12/03/2014*; 7:00 pm		at SMU	L 55–62	0–5	Moody Coliseum (937); Dallas, TX
12/07/2014*; 11:00 am, FSN		Oklahoma	L 39–68	0–6	The Super Pit (1,937); Denton, TX
12/14/2014*; 2:00 pm		at UMKC	W 65–47	1–6	Swinney Recreation Center (320); Kansas City, MO
12/17/2014*; 9:00 pm		at San Francisco	L 42–60	1–7	War Memorial Gymnasium (157); San Francisco, CA
12/21/2014*; 3:30 pm		Texas–Arlington	L 38–46	1–8	The Super Pit (335); Denton, TX
12/28/2014*; 2:00 pm		Denver	L 55–63	1–9	The Super Pit (511); Denton, TX
12/31/2014*; 4:00 pm		at No. 5 Texas A&M	L 38–75	1–10	Reed Arena (4,015); College Station, TX
01/02/2015; 8:00 pm		at UTEP	L 58–60	1–11 (0–1)	Don Haskins Center (1,702); El Paso, TX
01/04/2015; 2:00 pm		at UTSA	L 45–53	1–12 (0–2)	Convocation Center (342); San Antonio, TX
01/10/2015; 4:00 pm		Rice	W 53–48	2–12 (1–2)	The Super Pit (412); Denton, TX
01/15/2015; 7:00 pm		Charlotte	L 58–67	2–13 (1–3)	The Super Pit (490); Denton, TX
01/17/2015; 4:00 pm		Old Dominion	L 44–54	2–14 (1–4)	The Super Pit (837); Denton, TX
01/22/2015; 6:30 pm		at Louisiana Tech	L 57–92	2–15 (1–5)	Thomas Assembly Center (1,260); Ruston, LA
01/24/2015; 4:00 pm		at Southern Miss	L 55–67	2–16 (1–6)	Reed Green Coliseum (1,126); Hattiesburg, MS
02/01/2015; 2:00 pm, ASN		at Rice	L 55–58 ^{OT}	2–17 (1–7)	Tudor Fieldhouse (321); Houston, TX
02/05/2015; 7:00 pm		WKU	L 49–77	2–18 (1–8)	The Super Pit (437); Denton, TX
02/07/2015; 4:00 pm		Marshall	W 45–42	3–18 (2–8)	The Super Pit (277); Denton, TX
02/12/2015; 7:00 pm		at UAB	L 40–74	3–19 (2–9)	Bartow Arena (474); Birmingham, AL
02/14/2015; 4:00 pm		at Middle Tennessee	L 59–85	3–20 (2–10)	Murphy Center (4,414); Murfreesboro, TN
02/19/2015; 7:00 pm		Florida Atlantic	W 74–55	4–20 (3–10)	The Super Pit (720); Denton, TX
02/21/2015; 4:00 pm		FIU	W 77–61	5–20 (4–10)	The Super Pit (764); Denton, TX
02/26/2015; 6:00 pm		at Charlotte	L 46–71	5–21 (4–11)	Dale F. Halton Arena (562); Charlotte, NC
02/28/2015; 12:00 pm		at Old Dominion	L 48–70	5–22 (4–12)	Ted Constant Convocation Center (2,731); Norfolk, VA
03/05/2015; 7:00 pm		UTSA	L 61–69	5–23 (4–13)	The Super Pit (888); Denton, TX
03/07/2015; 4:00 pm		UTEP	L 54–57	5–24 (4–14)	The Super Pit (354); Denton, TX
*Non-conference game. ^{#}Rankings from AP Poll. (#) Tournament seedings in parentheses. All times are in Central Time.

== See also ==
- 2014–15 North Texas Mean Green men's basketball team
