= 2014–15 Southern Miss Lady Eagles basketball team =

Intercollegiate basketball season

2014–15 Southern Miss Lady Eagles basketball

Lady Eagle Thanksgiving Classic Champions

WNIT, Quarterfinals
- Conference: Conference USA
- Record: 25–11 (13–5 C-USA)
- Head coach: Joye Lee-McNelis (11th season)
- Assistant coaches: Jordan Dupuy; Pauline Love; Alaura Sharp
- Home arena: Reed Green Coliseum

2014–15 Conference USA women's basketball standings
	Conf.				Overall
Team	W		L	PCT	W		L	PCT
WKU †	16	–	2	.889	30	–	5	.857
Middle Tennessee	14	–	4	.778	24	–	10	.706
Southern Miss	13	–	5	.722	25	–	11	.694
Old Dominion	11	–	7	.611	21	–	13	.618
UAB	11	–	7	.611	18	–	13	.581
UTSA	11	–	7	.611	16	–	15	.516
Louisiana Tech	10	–	8	.556	16	–	15	.516
Charlotte	10	–	8	.556	15	–	17	.469
Marshall	8	–	10	.444	17	–	15	.531
Florida Atlantic	7	–	11	.389	13	–	17	.433
UTEP	7	–	11	.389	12	–	16	.429
Rice	4	–	14	.222	9	–	21	.300
North Texas	4	–	14	.222	5	–	24	.172
FIU	0	–	18	.000	3	–	26	.103
† 2015 C-USA tournament winner As of 29 March 2015; Rankings from AP poll

The 2014–15 Southern Miss Lady Eagles basketball team represented the University of Southern Mississippi during the 2014–15 NCAA Division I women's basketball season. The Lady Eagles, led by eleventh year head coach Joye Lee-McNelis, played their home games at Reed Green Coliseum and were members of Conference USA. They finished the season 25–11, 13–5 in C-USA play to finish in third place. They advanced to the championship game of the C-USA women's tournament, where they lost to Western Kentucky. They were invited to the Women's National Invitation Tournament, where they defeated Texas Southern in the first round, TCU in the second round, Eastern Michigan in the third round before falling to Michigan in the quarterfinals.

== Roster ==
2014–15 Southern Miss Golden Eagles women's basketball team
Players
Coaches

Pos.	#	Name	Height	Year	Previous school	Hometown
G	00	Alex Coyne	5 ft 5 in (1.65 m)	So	Lake Placid HS	Lake Placid, FL
F	2	Lashyra Cotton	5 ft 11 in (1.8 m)	So	East Side HS	Cleveland, MS
F	4	Tamara Jones	5 ft 11 in (1.8 m)	Sr	Garden City CC	Prosser, WA
G	10	Jerontay Clemons	5 ft 8 in (1.73 m)	Jr	Coldwater HS	Coldwater, MS
F	11	Voche' Martin	6 ft 3 in (1.91 m)	Jr	Paris JC	DeSoto, TX
G	12	Brittanny Dinkins	5 ft 7 in (1.7 m)	So	Norland HS	Miami, FL
G	14	Katie Dozier	5 ft 6 in (1.68 m)	Fr	Walton HS	Marietta, GA
C	15	Jessica Powers	6 ft 6 in (1.98 m)	Fr	Pearl River Central HS	Carriere, MS
F	20	Kierra Jordan	6 ft 0 in (1.83 m)	So	Lanier HS	Jackson, MS
G/F	21	Jayla King (redshirt)	5 ft 9 in (1.75 m)	So	South Florida	Pensacola, FL
G	22	Megan Brown	5 ft 10 in (1.78 m)	Fr	Salmen HS	Slidell, LA
G	23	Brooke Rhodes	5 ft 8 in (1.73 m)	GS	Delta State	Pelahatchie, MS
F	24	Ashley Folsom	6 ft 3 in (1.91 m)	So	Father Lopez HS	Deltona, FA

Head coach

Joye Lee-McNelis

Assistant coach(es)

Jordan Dupuy
Pauline Love
Alaura Sharp

Legend

- (C) Team captain
- (S) Suspended
- (I) Ineligible
- (W) Walk-on
- Injured
- Current redshirt

Roster

== Rankings ==
Regular season polls
Poll	Pre- Season	Week 2	Week 3	Week 4	Week 5	Week 6	Week 7	Week 8	Week 9	Week 10	Week 11	Week 12	Week 13	Week 14	Week 15	Week 16	Week 17	Week 18	Week 19	Final
AP																				
Coaches																				

Legend
	Increase in ranking
	Decrease in ranking
	No change
(RV)	Received votes

== Schedule ==
Date time, TV	Rank^{#}	Opponent^{#}	Result	Record	Site (attendance) city, state
Exhibition
11/08/2014*; 12:00 pm		West Florida	W 68–59	–	Reed Green Coliseum (N/A); Hattiesburg, MS
Regular season
11/14/2014*; 11:00 am		William Carey	W 98–45	1–0	Reed Green Coliseum (3,052); Hattiesburg, MS
11/17/2014*; 7:05 pm		at South Alabama	W 64–53	2–0	Mitchell Center (421); Mobile, AL
11/19/2014*; 6:00 pm		Mississippi Valley State	W 69–51	3–0	Reed Green Coliseum (1,150); Hattiesburg, MS
11/23/2014*; 2:00 pm		at McNeese State	L 55–57	3–1	Burton Coliseum (589); Lake Charles, LA
11/28/2014*; 3:00 pm		Austin Peay; Lady Eagle Thanksgiving Classic semifinals	W 80–71	4–1	Reed Green Coliseum (602); Hattiesburg, MS
11/29/2014*; 7:00 pm		North Carolina A&T; Lady Eagle Thanksgiving Classic championship	W 72–48	5–1	Reed Green Coliseum (1,117); Hattiesburg, MS
12/03/2014*; 5:00 pm		Tennessee Tech	W 80–58	6–1	Reed Green Coliseum (1,148); Hattiesburg, MS
12/06/2014*; 6:00 pm, ESPN3		at Florida Gulf Coast	L 62–78	6–2	Alico Arena (1,624); Fort Myers, FL
12/14/2014*; 2:00 pm, ASN		No. 22 Mississippi State	L 46–73	6–3	Reed Green Coliseum (2,561); Hattiesburg, MS
12/18/2014*; 4:00 pm		at Ole Miss	L 66–68	6–4	Tad Smith Coliseum (796); Oxford, MS
12/29/2014*; 6:00 pm		at Nicholls State	W 89–57	7–4	Stopher Gym (501); Thibodaux, LA
01/04/2015; 3:00 pm		at Louisiana Tech	W 79–77 ^{OT}	8–4 (1–0)	Thomas Assembly Center (1,804); Ruston, LA
01/08/2015; 6:00 pm		UTSA	W 69–60 ^{OT}	9–4 (2–0)	Reed Green Coliseum (1,052); Hattiesburg, MS
01/10/2015; 4:00 pm		UTEP	L 59–71	9–5 (2–1)	Reed Green Coliseum (1,380); Hattiesburg, MS
01/15/2015; 7:00 pm		at Middle Tennessee	W 77–75	10–5 (3–1)	Murphy Center (3,912); Murfreesboro, TN
01/17/2015; 2:00 pm		at UAB	L 49–62	10–6 (3–2)	Bartow Arena (462); Birmingham, AL
01/22/2015; 6:00 pm		Rice	W 65–54	11–6 (4–2)	Reed Green Coliseum (1,046); Hattiesburg, MS
01/24/2015; 4:00 pm		North Texas	W 67–55	12–6 (5–2)	Reed Green Coliseum (1,126); Hattiesburg, MS
01/29/2015; 5:00 pm		at Marshall	L 65–67	12–7 (5–3)	Cam Henderson Center (454); Huntington, WV
01/31/2015; 2:00 pm		at WKU	W 63–61	13–7 (6–3)	E. A. Diddle Arena (1,766); Bowling Green, KY
02/05/2015; 6:00 pm		Middle Tennessee	W 70–65 ^{OT}	14–7 (7–3)	Reed Green Coliseum (1,277); Hattiesburg, MS
02/07/2015; 4:00 pm		UAB	W 44–39	15–7 (8–3)	Reed Green Coliseum (1,212); Hattiesburg, MS
02/12/2015; 5:00 pm		at FIU	W 78–65	16–7 (9–3)	FIU Arena (234); Miami, FL
02/14/2015; 4:00 pm		at Florida Atlantic	W 67–65	17–7 (10–3)	FAU Arena (530); Boca Raton, FL
02/19/2015; 6:00 pm		Old Dominion	W 70–53	18–7 (11–3)	Reed Green Coliseum (1,285); Hattiesburg, MS
02/21/2015; 4:00 pm		Charlotte	L 72–83	18–8 (11–4)	Reed Green Coliseum (1,732); Hattiesburg, MS
02/26/2015; 7:00 pm		at UTSA	W 61–59	19–8 (12–4)	Convocation Center (645); San Antonio, TX
03/01/2015; 3:00 pm, FSN		at UTEP	W 66–60	20–8 (13–4)	Don Haskins Center (3,377); El Paso, TX
03/07/2015; 4:00 pm		Louisiana Tech	L 64–67	20–9 (13–5)	Reed Green Coliseum (1,514); Hattiesburg, MS
Conference USA Tournament
03/12/2015; 11:00 am, ASN		vs. UAB; Quarterfinals	W 80–66	21–9	Bartow Arena (888); Birmingham, AL
03/13/2015; 10:00 am, CBSSN		vs. Middle Tennessee; Semifinals	W 65–53	22–9	Birmingham–Jefferson Convention Complex (N/A); Birmingham, AL
03/14/2015; 7:00 pm, CBSSN		vs. WKU; Championship Game	L 57–60	22–10	Birmingham–Jefferson Convention Complex (N/A); Birmingham, AL
WNIT
03/19/2015*; 7:00 pm		Texas Southern; First Round	W 79–69	23–10	Reed Green Coliseum (1,358); Hattiesburg, MS
03/22/2015*; 2:00 pm		TCU; Second Round	W 77–73 ^{OT}	24–10	Reed Green Coliseum (1,726); Hattiesburg, MS
03/25/2015*; 7:00 pm		Eastern Michigan; Third Round	W 76–65	25–10	Reed Green Coliseum (2,937); Hattiesburg, MS
03/29/2015*; 2:00 pm		Michigan; Quarterfinals	L 60–69	25–11	Reed Green Coliseum (5,480); Hattiesburg, MS
*Non-conference game. ^{#}Rankings from AP Poll. (#) Tournament seedings in parentheses. All times are in Central Time.

== See also ==
- 2014–15 Southern Miss Golden Eagles basketball team
