= 2014–15 Rice Owls women's basketball team =

Intercollegiate basketball season

2014–15 Rice Owls women's basketball
- Conference: Conference USA
- Record: 9–21 (4–14 C-USA)
- Head coach: Greg Williams (9th season)
- Assistant coaches: Jae Kingi-Cross; Shane Laflin; Bianca Smith
- Home arena: Tudor Fieldhouse

2014–15 Conference USA women's basketball standings
	Conf.				Overall
Team	W		L	PCT	W		L	PCT
WKU †	16	–	2	.889	30	–	5	.857
Middle Tennessee	14	–	4	.778	24	–	10	.706
Southern Miss	13	–	5	.722	25	–	11	.694
Old Dominion	11	–	7	.611	21	–	13	.618
UAB	11	–	7	.611	18	–	13	.581
UTSA	11	–	7	.611	16	–	15	.516
Louisiana Tech	10	–	8	.556	16	–	15	.516
Charlotte	10	–	8	.556	15	–	17	.469
Marshall	8	–	10	.444	17	–	15	.531
Florida Atlantic	7	–	11	.389	13	–	17	.433
UTEP	7	–	11	.389	12	–	16	.429
Rice	4	–	14	.222	9	–	21	.300
North Texas	4	–	14	.222	5	–	24	.172
FIU	0	–	18	.000	3	–	26	.103
† 2015 C-USA tournament winner As of 29 March 2015; Rankings from AP poll

The 2014–15 Rice Owls women's basketball team represented Rice University during the 2014–15 NCAA Division I women's basketball season. The Owls, led by ninth-year head coach Greg Williams, played their home games at the Tudor Fieldhouse and were members of Conference USA. They finished the season 9–21, 4–14 in C-USA play to finish in a tie for twelfth place. They lost in the first round of the C-USA women's tournament to Old Dominion.

== Roster ==
2014–15 Rice Owls women's basketball team
Players
Coaches

Pos.	#	Name	Height	Year	Previous school	Hometown
G	0	Breion Allen	5 ft 9 in (1.75 m)	Jr	Hoover HS	Hoover, AL
G	3	Maya Hawkins	5 ft 6 in (1.68 m)	So	Lake Ridge HS	Mansfield, TX
G	5	Reem Moussa	5 ft 5 in (1.65 m)	Sr	Coppell HS	Cairo, Egypt
G	10	Wendy Knight	5 ft 9 in (1.75 m)	Fr	Reagan HS	San Antonio, TX
F	15	Megan Shafer	6 ft 0 in (1.83 m)	Sr	College Park HS	The Woodlands, TX
G	20	Shani Rainey	5 ft 10 in (1.78 m)	Fr	Lovejoy HS	Fairview, TX
G	21	Nakachi Maduka	5 ft 11 in (1.8 m)	Sr	Martin HS	Arlington, TX
G	22	Maya Adetula	5 ft 10 in (1.78 m)	Sr	Mansfield HS	Mansfield, TX
G	24	Elena Gumbs	5 ft 5 in (1.65 m)	Jr	Cedar Ridge HS	Cibolo, TX
F	25	Courtney Brown	6 ft 2 in (1.88 m)	Fr	Steele HS	Austin, TX
G/F	31	Christal Porter	6 ft 0 in (1.83 m)	Sr	Germantown HS	Germantown, TN
G/F	32	Alyssa Lang	6 ft 1 in (1.85 m)	Jr	Rockwall HS	Rockwall, TX
F	33	Jasmine Goodwine	6 ft 1 in (1.85 m)	So	Killeen HS	Killeen, TX
F	40	Megan Palmer	6 ft 1 in (1.85 m)	Jr	Cinco Ranch HS	Katy, TX
G/F	44	Adaeze Obinnah	6 ft 1 in (1.85 m)	So	Grandview HS	Aurora, CO

Head coach

Greg Williams

Assistant coach(es)

Jae Kingi-Cross
Shane Laflin
Bianca Smith

Legend

- (C) Team captain
- (S) Suspended
- (I) Ineligible
- (W) Walk-on
- Injured
- Current redshirt

Roster

== Rankings ==
+ Regular season polls	Poll	Pre- season	Week 2	Week 3	Week 4	Week 5	Week 6	Week 7	Week 8	Week 9	Week 10	Week 11	Week 12	Week 13	Week 14	Week 15	Week 16	Week 17	Week 18	Week 19	Final
AP																					
Coaches																					

Legend
	Increase in ranking
	Decrease in ranking
	No change
(RV)	Received votes

== Schedule ==
Date time, TV	Rank^{#}	Opponent^{#}	Result	Record	Site (attendance) city, state
Non-conference regular season
11/14/2014*; 6:00 pm		Prairie View A&M	W 70–58	1–0	Tudor Fieldhouse (467); Houston, TX
11/19/2014*; 7:00 pm		at No. 5 Texas A&M	L 55–76	1–1	Reed Arena (3,592); College Station, TX
11/22/2014*; 2:00 pm		Arkansas–Pine Bluff	L 40–55	1–2	Tudor Fieldhouse (294); Houston, TX
11/24/2014*; 6:00 pm		Texas A&M–Corpus Christi	W 59–54	2–2	Tudor Fieldhouse (379); Houston, TX
11/28/2014*; 6:00 pm		Alcorn State	W 61–33	3–2	Tudor Fieldhouse (317); Houston, TX
12/03/2014*; 7:00 pm		at Houston; Bayou Cup	L 58–59	3–3	Hofheinz Pavilion (286); Houston, TX
12/06/2014*; 2:00 pm		Stephen F. Austin	L 59–70	3–4	Tudor Fieldhouse (187); Houston, TX
12/19/2014*; 6:00 pm		McNeese State	W 57–55 ^{OT}	4–4	Tudor Fieldhouse (220); Houston, TX
12/22/2014*; 2:00 pm		at Texas Southern	L 63–69	4–5	Health and Physical Education Arena (426); Houston, TX
12/28/2014*; 2:00 pm		Lamar	W 97–63	5–5	Tudor Fieldhouse (340); Houston, TX
12/30/2014*; 7:00 pm, LHN		at No. 3 Texas	L 54–77	5–6	Frank Erwin Center (3,009); Austin, TX
C-USA regular season
01/02/2015; 7:00 pm		at UTSA	W 62–58 ^{OT}	6–6 (1–0)	Convocation Center (324); San Antonio, TX
01/04/2015; 2:00 pm		at UTEP	L 51–54	6–7 (1–1)	Don Haskins Center (2,042); El Paso, TX
01/10/2015; 4:00 pm		at North Texas	L 48–53	6–8 (1–2)	The Super Pit (412); Denton, TX
01/15/2015; 6:00 pm		Old Dominion	L 55–62	6–9 (1–3)	Tudor Fieldhouse (130); Houston, TX
01/17/2015; 2:00 pm		Charlotte	L 59–62	6–10 (1–4)	Tudor Fieldhouse (337); Houston, TX
01/22/2015; 6:00 pm		at Southern Miss	L 54–65	6–11 (1–5)	Reed Green Coliseum (1,046); Hattiesburg, MS
01/24/2015; 6:00 pm		at Louisiana Tech	L 71–88	6–12 (1–6)	Thomas Assembly Center (2,415); Ruston, LA
02/01/2015; 2:00 pm, ASN		North Texas	W 58–55 ^{OT}	7–12 (2–6)	Tudor Fieldhouse (321); Houston, TX
02/05/2015; 6:00 pm		Marshall	L 69–72	7–13 (2–7)	Tudor Fieldhouse (218); Houston, TX
02/07/2015; 2:00 pm		WKU	L 76–83	7–14 (2–8)	Tudor Fieldhouse (547); Houston, TX
02/12/2015; 7:00 pm		at Middle Tennessee	L 61–79	7–15 (2–9)	Murphy Center (4,094); Murfreesboro, TN
02/14/2015; 2:00 pm		at UAB	L 59–75	7–16 (2–10)	Bartow Arena (512); Bingingham, AL
02/19/2015; 6:00 pm		FIU	W 80–59	8–16 (3–10)	Tudor Fieldhouse (130); Houston, TX
02/21/2015; 2:00 pm		Florida Atlantic	L 70–82	8–17 (3–11)	Tudor Fieldhouse (245); Houston, TX
02/26/2015; 11:00 am		at Old Dominion	L 68–83	8–18 (3–12)	Ted Constant Convocation Center (1,533); Norfolk, VA
02/28/2015; 6:00 pm		at Charlotte	L 59–74	8–19 (3–13)	Dale F. Halton Arena (858); Charlotte, NC
03/05/2015; 6:00 pm		UTSA	L 49–60	8–20 (3–14)	Tudor Fieldhouse (277); Houston, TX
03/07/2015; 2:00 pm		UTEP	W 79–62	9–20 (4–14)	Tudor Fieldhouse (747); Houston, TX
Conference USA Women's Tournament
03/11/2015; 7:30 pm, ASN		vs. Old Dominion; First Round	L 57–62	9–21	Bartow Arena (313); Birmingham, AL
*Non-conference game. ^{#}Rankings from AP Poll. (#) Tournament seedings in parentheses. All times are in Central Time.

== See also ==
- 2014–15 Rice Owls men's basketball team
