= 2014–15 Old Dominion Monarchs women's basketball team =

Intercollegiate basketball season

2014–15 Old Dominion Monarchs women's basketball

WNIT, Second Round
- Conference: Conference USA
- Record: 21–13 (11–7 C-USA)
- Head coach: Karen Barefoot (4th season)
- Assistant coaches: Trina Patterson; Richard Fortune; Jim Corrigan
- Home arena: Ted Constant Convocation Center

2014–15 Conference USA women's basketball standings
	Conf.				Overall
Team	W		L	PCT	W		L	PCT
WKU †	16	–	2	.889	30	–	5	.857
Middle Tennessee	14	–	4	.778	24	–	10	.706
Southern Miss	13	–	5	.722	25	–	11	.694
Old Dominion	11	–	7	.611	21	–	13	.618
UAB	11	–	7	.611	18	–	13	.581
UTSA	11	–	7	.611	16	–	15	.516
Louisiana Tech	10	–	8	.556	16	–	15	.516
Charlotte	10	–	8	.556	15	–	17	.469
Marshall	8	–	10	.444	17	–	15	.531
Florida Atlantic	7	–	11	.389	13	–	17	.433
UTEP	7	–	11	.389	12	–	16	.429
Rice	4	–	14	.222	9	–	21	.300
North Texas	4	–	14	.222	5	–	24	.172
FIU	0	–	18	.000	3	–	26	.103
† 2015 C-USA tournament winner As of 29 March 2015; Rankings from AP poll

The 2014–15 Old Dominion Monarchs women’s basketball team represented Old Dominion University during the 2014–15 NCAA Division I women's basketball season. The Monarchs, led by fourth year head coach Karen Barefoot, played their home games at Ted Constant Convocation Center and were members of Conference USA.

The Monarchs finished the season 21–13, 11–7 in C-USA play to finish in a three way tie for fourth place. They advanced to the semifinals of the C-USA women's tournament where they lost to WKU. They were invited to the Women's National Invitation Tournament where they defeated Virginia in the first round before losing to Villanova in the second round.

== Roster ==
2014–15 Old Dominion Monarchs women's basketball team
Players
Coaches

Pos.	#	Name	Height	Year	Previous school	Hometown
F	3	Chelisa Painter	6 ft 1 in (1.85 m)	RS Sr	Indian River	Chesapeake, Va.
G	5	Galaisha Goodhope (I)	5 ft 5 in (1.65 m)	Jr	Princess Anne	Norfolk, Va.
G	11	Ashley Betz-White	5 ft 4 in (1.63 m)	RS Jr	Trinity	Mechanicsburg, Pa.
C	12	Maia Lee	6 ft 3 in (1.91 m)	Fr	McLean	McLean, Va.
F	14	Annika Holopainen	6 ft 1 in (1.85 m)	RS So	Makelanrinteen Lukio	Helsinki, Finland
G	20	Keyana Brown	5 ft 11 in (1.8 m)	Fr	Lafayette	Williamsburg, Va.
C	23	Ije Ajemba	6 ft 3 in (1.91 m)	So	Parkdale	Lanham, Md.
G	24	LaQuanda Younger	5 ft 10 in (1.78 m)	Jr	Warwick	Newport News, Va.
F	25	Jennie Simms	6 ft 0 in (1.83 m)	RS So	Riverdale Baptist	Accokeek, Md.
G	30	Ashley Jackson	5 ft 9 in (1.75 m)	Fr	Ridgeway	Memphis, Tenn.
F	32	Tiffany Minor	6 ft 0 in (1.83 m)	Jr	The Maret School	Upper Marlboro, Md.
F	34	Odegua Oigbokie	6 ft 1 in (1.85 m)	So	Ridgeway	Memphis, Tenn.
F	40	Destinee Young	6 ft 1 in (1.85 m)	So	Hoffman Estates	Hoffman Estates, Ill.

Head coach

- Karen Barefoot (Christopher Newport)

Assistant coach(es)

- Trina Patterson (Virginia)
- Richard Fortune
- Jim Corrigan

Legend

- (C) Team captain
- (S) Suspended
- (I) Ineligible
- (W) Walk-on
- Injured
- Current redshirt

Roster
Last update: February 19, 2024

== Schedule ==
Date time, TV	Rank^{#}	Opponent^{#}	Result	Record	Site (attendance) city, state
Non-conference regular season
11/14/2014*; 7:00 pm		Presbyterian	W 41–26	1–0	Ted Constant Center (2,076); Norfolk, VA
11/17/2014*; 7:00 pm		William & Mary; Rivalry	W 66–58	2–0	Ted Constant Center (1,994); Norfolk, VA
11/20/2014*; 7:00 pm		No. 7 Duke	L 66–82	2–1	Ted Constant Center (3,452); Norfolk, VA
11/25/2014*; 7:00 pm		at Virginia Tech	W 69–62	3–1	Cassell Coliseum (1,189); Blacksburg, VA
11/30/2014*; 7:00 pm		Rider	L 57–60 ^{OT}	3–2	Ted Constant Center (1,858); Norfolk, VA
12/03/2014*; 11:00 am		Howard	W 75–54	4–2	Ted Constant Center (8,472); Norfolk, VA
12/05/2014*; 7:00 pm, COX		VCU; Rivalry	W 66–44	5–2	Ted Constant Center (2,141); Norfolk, VA
12/15/2014*; 7:00 pm		at No. 10 Louisville	L 46–100	5–3	KFC Yum! Center (7,726); Louisville, KY
12/20/2014*; 8:00 pm		vs. Miami (OH); Las Vegas Holiday Hoops Classic	W 69–63	6–3	South Point Arena (N/A); Las Vegas, NV
12/21/2014*; 9:30 pm		vs. UIC; Las Vegas Holiday Hoops Classic	W 61–55	7–3	South Point Arena (217); Las Vegas, NV
12/29/2014*; 9:00 pm, P12N		at California	L 59–79	7–4	Haas Pavilion (1,576); Berkeley, CA
C-USA regular season
01/04/2015; 2:00 pm		Charlotte	W 66–57	8–4 (1–0)	Ted Constant Center (3,240); Norfolk, VA
01/08/2015; 7:00 pm		Marshall	L 37–69	8–5 (1–1)	Ted Constant Center (1,808); Norfolk, VA
01/10/2015; 2:00 pm		No. 25 WKU	L 60–76	8–6 (1–2)	Ted Constant Center (2,188); Norfolk, VA
01/15/2015; 7:00 pm		at Rice	W 62–55	9–6 (2–2)	Tudor Fieldhouse (130); Houston, TX
01/17/2015; 5:00 pm		at North Texas	W 54–44	10–6 (3–2)	The Super Pit (837); Denton, TX
01/22/2015; 7:00 pm		Middle Tennessee	L 48–65	10–7 (3–3)	Ted Constant Center (1,892); Norfolk, VA
01/24/2015; 2:00 pm		UAB	W 58–46	11–7 (4–3)	Ted Constant Center (2,227); Norfolk, VA
01/29/2015; 6:00 pm		at FIU	W 80–67	12–7 (5–3)	FIU Arena (N/A); Miami, FL
01/31/2015; 5:00 pm		at Florida Atlantic	W 72–44	13–7 (6–3)	FAU Arena (619); Boca Raton, FL
02/07/2015; 7:00 pm		at Charlotte	L 67–82	13–8 (6–4)	Dale F. Halton Arena (905); Charlotte, NC
02/12/2015; 7:00 pm		UTSA	L 51–52	13–9 (6–5)	Ted Constant Center (2,181); Norfolk, VA
02/14/2015; 2:00 pm		UTEP	W 79–50	14–9 (7–5)	Ted Constant Center (3,204); Norfolk, VA
02/19/2015; 7:00 pm		at Southern Miss	L 53–70	14–10 (7–6)	Reed Green Coliseum (1,285); Hattiesburg, MS
02/21/2015; 3:00 pm, FSN		at Louisiana Tech	W 72–71	15–10 (8–6)	Thomas Assembly Center (2,722); Ruston, LA
02/26/2015; 11:00 am		Rice	W 83–68	16–10 (9–6)	Ted Constant Center (1,533); Norfolk, VA
02/28/2015; 1:00 pm		North Texas	W 70–48	17–10 (10–6)	Ted Constant Center (2,731); Norfolk, VA
03/05/2015; 6:00 pm		at Marshall	W 67–55	18–10 (11–6)	Cam Henderson Center (575); Huntington, WV
03/07/2015; 3:00 pm		at WKU	L 62–71	18–11 (11–7)	E. A. Diddle Arena (3,102); Bowling Green, KY
C-USA Tournament
03/11/2015; 8:30 pm, ASN		vs. Rice; First Round	W 62–57	19–11	Bartow Arena (313); Birmingham, AL
03/12/2015; 8:30 pm, ASN		vs. UTSA; Quarterfinals	W 63–49	20–11	Bartow Arena (211); Birmingham, AL
03/13/2015; 10:00 am, CBSSN		vs. WKU; Semifinals	L 59–61	20–12	BJCC (N/A); Birmingham, AL
WNIT
03/19/2015*; 7:00 pm		Virginia; First Round	W 69–62	21–12	Ted Constant Center (973); Norfolk, VA
03/22/2015*; 2:00 pm		at Villanova; Second Round	L 66–71	21–13	The Pavilion (349); Villanova, PA
*Non-conference game. ^{#}Rankings from AP Poll. (#) Tournament seedings in parentheses. All times are in Eastern Time.

- Source: Old Dominion Athletics

== See also ==
- 2014–15 Old Dominion Monarchs men's basketball team
