= 2014–15 Louisiana Tech Lady Techsters basketball team =

Intercollegiate basketball season

2014–15 Louisiana Tech Lady Techsters basketball
- Conference: Conference USA
- Record: 16–15 (10–8 C-USA)
- Head coach: Tyler Summitt (1st season)
- Assistant coaches: Mickie DeMoss; Bernitha Johnson; Amber Smith
- Home arena: Thomas Assembly Center

2014–15 Conference USA women's basketball standings
	Conf.				Overall
Team	W		L	PCT	W		L	PCT
WKU †	16	–	2	.889	30	–	5	.857
Middle Tennessee	14	–	4	.778	24	–	10	.706
Southern Miss	13	–	5	.722	25	–	11	.694
Old Dominion	11	–	7	.611	21	–	13	.618
UAB	11	–	7	.611	18	–	13	.581
UTSA	11	–	7	.611	16	–	15	.516
Louisiana Tech	10	–	8	.556	16	–	15	.516
Charlotte	10	–	8	.556	15	–	17	.469
Marshall	8	–	10	.444	17	–	15	.531
Florida Atlantic	7	–	11	.389	13	–	17	.433
UTEP	7	–	11	.389	12	–	16	.429
Rice	4	–	14	.222	9	–	21	.300
North Texas	4	–	14	.222	5	–	24	.172
FIU	0	–	18	.000	3	–	26	.103
† 2015 C-USA tournament winner As of 29 March 2015; Rankings from AP poll

The 2014–15 Louisiana Tech Lady Techsters basketball team represented the Louisiana Tech University during the 2014–15 NCAA Division I women's basketball season. The Lady Techsters, led by first year head coach Tyler Summitt, played their home games at the Thomas Assembly Center and were members of Conference USA. They finished the season 16–15, 10–8 in C-USA play to finish in a tie for seventh place. They advanced to the quarterfinals of the C-USA women's tournament where they lost to Middle Tennessee State University.

== Roster ==
2014–15 Louisiana Tech Lady Techsters women's basketball team
Players
Coaches

Pos.	#	Name	Height	Year	Previous school	Hometown
G	00	JaQuan Jackson	5 ft 8 in (1.73 m)	So	Harker Heights HS	Killeen, Texas
G	1	Kelia Shelton	5 ft 8 in (1.73 m)	Sr	Clemson	Rock Hill, SC.
F	2	Whitney Frazier	6 ft 0 in (1.83 m)	Sr	El Dorado HS	El Dorado, Ark.
G	3	Ruby Richie	5 ft 6 in (1.68 m)	So	Ouachita Baptist	Ruston, Louisiana
G	10	Christassia Walter	5 ft 8 in (1.73 m)	Sr	Hutchinson CC	Texarkana, Ark.
G	12	Brooklyn Pumroy	5 ft 9 in (1.75 m)	Jr	Marquette	Fairborn, Ohio
G	21	Kanedria Andrews	5 ft 9 in (1.75 m)	Sr	El Dorado HS	El Dorado, Ark.
G	24	Tiara Davenport	6 ft 0 in (1.83 m)	Fr	Duncanville HS	Duncanville, Texas
G/F	25	Brandi Wingate	6 ft 2 in (1.88 m)	Jr	Northwest Florida State	Columbia, Maryland
G	30	Ashley Santos	5 ft 11 in (1.8 m)	So	Marquette	Geneva, Illinois
F	32	Kevione Moten	6 ft 4 in (1.93 m)	So	Ouachita HS	Monroe, La.
F	33	Savanna Langston	6 ft 2 in (1.88 m)	Sr	Parkers Chapel HS	El Dorado, Ark.

Head coach

Tyler Summitt

Assistant coach(es)

Mickie DeMoss
Bernitha Johnson
Amber Smith

Legend

- (C) Team captain
- (S) Suspended
- (I) Ineligible
- (W) Walk-on
- Injured
- Current redshirt

Roster
Last update: 2014-10-20

== Schedule ==
Date time, TV	Rank^{#}	Opponent^{#}	Result	Record	Site (attendance) city, state
Exhibition
11/01/2014*; 7:00 pm		Mississippi College	W 85–36	–	Thomas Assembly Center (N/A); Ruston, LA
11/08/2014*; 6:00 pm		LSU–Alexandria	W 91–36	–	Thomas Assembly Center (N/A); Ruston, LA
Regular season
11/15/2014*; 7:30 pm		at Stephen F. Austin	W 76–69	1–0	William R. Johnson Coliseum (1,833); Nacogdoches, TX
11/18/2014*; 6:30 pm		at Northwestern State	L 57–69	1–1	Prather Coliseum (1,418); Natchitoches, LA
11/22/2014*; 12:00 pm		at Louisiana–Lafayette	L 55–58	1–2	Earl K. Long Gymnasium (487); Lafayette, LA
11/29/2014*; 2:00 pm		at Alabama A&M	W 70–68	2–2	Elmore Gymnasium (215); Huntsville, AL
12/03/2014*; 7:00 pm, SECN		at LSU	L 59–73	2–3	Maravich Center (2,272); Baton Rouge, LA
12/07/2014*; 3:00 pm		Loyola (New Orleans)	W 75–61	3–3	Thomas Assembly Center (2,107); Ruston, LA
12/11/2014*; 7:00 pm		at No. 22 Mississippi State	L 77–81	3–4	Humphrey Coliseum (3,012); Starkville, MS
12/15/2014*; 6:30 pm		Nicholls State	W 80–62	4–4	Thomas Assembly Center (2,215); Ruston, LA
12/20/2014*; 4:00 pm		at Utah	L 52–67	4–5	Jon M. Huntsman Center (453); Salt Lake City, UT
12/29/2014*; 1:00 pm		vs. Harvard; Georgia Tech Tournament semifinals	W 83–64	5–5	Hank McCamish Pavilion (217); Atlanta, GA
12/30/2014*; 3:00 pm		at Georgia Tech; Georgia Tech Tournament championship	L 81–96	5–6	Hank McCamish Pavilion (656); Atlanta, GA
01/04/2015; 3:00 pm		Southern Miss	L 77–79 ^{OT}	5–7 (0–1)	Thomas Assembly Center (1,804); Ruston, LA
01/08/2015; 6:30 pm		UTEP	W 90–72	6–7 (1–1)	Thomas Assembly Center (1,808); Ruston, LA
01/10/2015; 6:00 pm		UTSA	W 79–74	7–7 (2–1)	Thomas Assembly Center (2,410); Ruston, LA
01/15/2015; 7:00 pm		at UAB	W 61–55	8–7 (3–1)	Bartow Arena (414); Birmingham, AL
01/17/2015; 7:00 pm, ASN		at Middle Tennessee	L 59–82	8–8 (3–2)	Murphy Center (4,917); Murfreesboro, TN
01/22/2015; 6:30 pm		North Texas	W 92–57	9–8 (4–2)	Thomas Assembly Center (1,260); Ruston, LA
01/24/2015; 6:00 pm		Rice	W 88–71	10–8 (5–2)	Thomas Assembly Center (2,415); Ruston, LA
01/29/2015; 7:00 pm, FCS		at WKU	L 66–82	10–9 (5–3)	E. A. Diddle Arena (3,144); Bowling Green, KY
01/31/2015; 12:00 pm		at Marshall	W 68–67	11–9 (6–3)	Cam Henderson Center (643); Huntington, WV
02/05/2015; 6:30 pm		UAB	L 56–64	11–10 (6–4)	Thomas Assembly Center (2,305); Ruston, LA
02/07/2015; 6:00 pm		Middle Tennessee	L 44–68	11–11 (6–5)	Thomas Assembly Center (1,907); Ruston, LA
02/12/2015; 6:00 pm		at Florida Atlantic	W 73–68	12–11 (7–5)	FAU Arena (665); Miami, FL
02/14/2015; 5:00 pm		at FIU	W 79–56	13–11 (8–5)	FIU Arena (N/A); Boca Raton, FL
02/19/2015; 6:30 pm		Charlotte	W 71–61	14–11 (9–5)	Thomas Assembly Center (1,719); Ruston, LA
02/22/2015; 2:00 pm, FSN		Old Dominion	L 71–72	14–12 (9–6)	Thomas Assembly Center (2,722); Ruston, LA
02/27/2015; 1:00 pm		at UTEP; Postponed from 2/26	L 75–88	14–13 (9–7)	Don Haskins Center (1,888); El Paso, TX
03/01/2015; 12:00 pm		at UTSA; Postponed from 2/28	L 53–60	14–14 (9–8)	Convocation Center (676); San Antonio, TX
03/07/2015; 4:00 pm		at Southern Miss	W 67–64	15–14 (10–8)	Reed Green Coliseum (1,514); Hattiesburg, MS
C-USA Tournament
03/11/2015; 1:30 pm, ASN		vs. Florida Atlantic; First Round	W 84–74	16–14	Bartow Arena (284); Birmingham, AL
03/12/2015; 1:30 pm, ASN		vs. Middle Tennessee; Quarterfinals	L 58–75	16–15	Bartow Arena (632); Birmingham, AL
*Non-conference game. ^{#}Rankings from AP Poll. (#) Tournament seedings in parentheses. All times are in Central Time.

== See also ==
- 2014–15 Louisiana Tech Bulldogs basketball team
