= 2014–15 Louisville Cardinals women's basketball team =

Intercollegiate basketball season

2014–15 Louisville Cardinals women's basketball

NCAA tournament, Sweet Sixteen
- Conference: Atlantic Coast Conference

Ranking
- Coaches: No. 8
- AP: No. 8
- Record: 27–7 (12–4 ACC)
- Head coach: Jeff Walz (8th season)
- Assistant coaches: Stephanie Norman; Sam Purcell; Samantha Williams
- Home arena: KFC Yum! Center

2014–15 ACC women's basketball standings
	Conf.				Overall
Team	W		L	PCT	W		L	PCT
No. 2 Notre Dame^{†}	15	–	1	.938	36	–	3	.923
No. 7 Florida State	14	–	2	.875	32	–	5	.865
No. 8 Louisville	12	–	4	.750	27	–	7	.794
No. 16 Duke	11	–	5	.688	23	–	11	.676
Syracuse	11	–	5	.688	22	–	10	.688
No. 15 North Carolina	10	–	6	.625	26	–	9	.743
Pittsburgh	9	–	7	.563	20	–	12	.625
Miami (FL)	8	–	8	.500	20	–	13	.606
Virginia	7	–	9	.438	17	–	14	.548
NC State	7	–	9	.438	18	–	15	.545
Georgia Tech	7	–	9	.438	19	–	15	.559
Boston College	5	–	11	.313	13	–	17	.433
Wake Forest	2	–	14	.125	13	–	20	.394
Virginia Tech	1	–	15	.063	12	–	20	.375
Clemson	1	–	15	.063	9	–	21	.300
† 2015 ACC tournament winner As of 7 April 2015; Rankings from AP poll

The 2014–15 Louisville Cardinals women's basketball team represented the University of Louisville during the 2014–15 NCAA Division I women's basketball season. The Cardinals, led by eighth-year head coach Jeff Walz, played their home games at the KFC Yum! Center and were in their first year in the Atlantic Coast Conference. They finished the season 27–7, 12–4 in ACC play to finish in third place. They advanced to the semifinals of the ACC women's tournament, where they lost to Florida State. They received an at-large bid to the NCAA women's tournament, where they defeated BYU in the first round, South Florida in the second round before being upset by Dayton in the sweet sixteen.

== Roster ==
2014–15 Louisville Cardinals women's basketball team
Players
Coaches

Pos.	#	Name	Height	Year	Previous school	Hometown
F	00	Sara Hammond	6 ft 2 in (1.88 m)	Sr	Rockcastle County	Mount Vernon, Kentucky
F	2	Myisha Hines-Allen	6 ft 2 in (1.88 m)	Fr	Montclair	Montclair, New Jersey
C	3	Sheronne Vails	6 ft 4 in (1.93 m)	RS Sr	Arundel	Odenton, Maryland
F	4	Mariya Moore	6 ft 0 in (1.83 m)	Fr	Salesian	Hercules, California
G	11	Arica Carter	5 ft 8 in (1.73 m)	Fr	Long Beach Poly	Long Beach, California
F	12	Shawnta Dyer	6 ft 1 in (1.85 m)	RS Sr	Marion Harding	Marion, Ohio
F	13	Cortnee Walton	6 ft 3 in (1.91 m)	Jr	St. Mary's	Surprise, Arizona
C	15	Megan Deines	6 ft 1 in (1.85 m)	Jr	Glendale	Springfield, Missouri
G	21	Bria Smith	5 ft 10 in (1.78 m)	Sr	Christ the King	Massapequa, New York
G	22	Jude Schimmel	5 ft 6 in (1.68 m)	Sr	Franklin (Portland, OR)	Mission, Oregon
G	24	Ariana Freeman	5 ft 9 in (1.75 m)	Fr	Paul VI Catholic	Manassas, Virginia
F	31	Sydney Brackemyre	6 ft 1 in (1.85 m)	Fr	Clinton Massie School	Wilmington, Ohio
F	32	Emmonnie Henderson	6 ft 1 in (1.85 m)	So	Edwardsville	Edwardsville, Illinois

Head coach

- Jeff Walz (Northern Kentucky)

Assistant coach(es)

- Stephanie Norman (Arizona State)
- Sam Purcell (Auburn)
- Samantha Williams (Auburn)

Legend

- (C) Team captain
- (S) Suspended
- (I) Ineligible
- (W) Walk-on
- Injured
- Current redshirt

== Media ==
Select Cardinals games were broadcast on WHAS. This year, the Cardinals' games on CBS Sports Network were replaced by a set of games on the ACC RSN. Additional ACC games aired on ESPN3.

All Cardinals basketball games aired on Learfield Sports on WKRD 790 AM or WVKY 101.7 FM, depending on conflicts with Louisville and Kentucky football and men's basketball games.

== Schedule ==
Date time, TV	Rank^{#}	Opponent^{#}	Result	Record	Site (attendance) city, state
Regular season
11/14/2014*; 5:00 pm	No. 12	at IUPUI	W 89–69	1–0	Fairgrounds Coliseum (3,159); Indianapolis, IN
11/16/2014*; 7:00 pm	No. 12	Tennessee–Martin	W 77–43	2–0	KFC Yum! Center (7,892); Louisville, KY
11/20/2014*; 7:00 pm	No. 12	Belmont	W 95–35	3–0	KFC Yum! Center (7,404); Louisville, KY
11/23/2014*; 2:00 pm	No. 12	Ball State	W 69–56	4–0	KFC Yum! Center (8,081); Louisville, KY
11/25/2014*; 7:00 pm, ESPN3	No. 12	WKU	W 89–67	5–0	KFC Yum! Center (8,463); Louisville, KY
11/28/2014*; 7:00 pm	No. 12	Lafayette	W 102–61	6–0	KFC Yum! Center (7,923); Louisville, KY
11/30/2014*; 2:35 pm, ESPN3	No. 12	at Valparaiso	W 86–59	7–0	Athletics–Recreation Center (567); Valparaiso, IN
12/04/2014*; 7:00 pm, ESPN3	No. 7	No. 22 Iowa; ACC–Big Ten Women's Challenge	W 86–52	8–0	KFC Yum! Center (7,854); Louisville, KY
12/07/2014*; 2:00 pm, ESPN3	No. 7	No. 13 Kentucky; The Battle for the Bluegrass	L 68–77	8–1	KFC Yum! Center (14,862); Louisville, KY
12/15/2014*; 7:00 pm	No. 10	Old Dominion	W 100–46	9–1	KFC Yum! Center (7,726); Louisville, KY
12/18/2014*; 10:00 pm	No. 10	at Grand Canyon	W 65–51	10–1	GCU Arena (2,049); Phoenix, AZ
12/21/2014*; 5:00 pm, P12N	No. 10	at No. 24 California	W 70–57	11–1	Haas Pavilion (8,339); Berkeley, CA
12/29/2014*; 7:00 pm	No. 7	Evansville	W 73–51	12–1	KFC Yum! Center (7,909); Louisville, KY
01/02/2015; 7:00 pm, ESPN3	No. 7	Georgia Tech	W 75–48	13–1 (1–0)	KFC Yum! Center (9,049); Louisville, KY
01/04/2015; 2:00 pm	No. 7	at Pittsburgh	W 63–57	14–1 (2–0)	Peterson Events Center (1,811); Pittsburgh, PA
01/11/2015; 2:00 pm	No. 6	at Wake Forest	W 79–68	15–1 (3–0)	LJVM Coliseum (719); Winston-Salem, NC
01/14/2015; 7:00 pm, ESPN3	No. 4	NC State	W 65–58	16–1 (4–0)	KFC Yum! Center (7,736); Louisville, KY
01/18/2015; 3:00 pm, RSN	No. 4	Virginia	W 67–55	17–1 (5–0)	KFC Yum! Center (11,322); Louisville, KY
01/22/2015; 7:00 pm, ESPN3	No. 4	at No. 17 Florida State	L 63–68	17–2 (5–1)	Donald L. Tucker Civic Center (2,847); Tallahassee, FL
01/25/2015; 5:00 pm, RSN	No. 4	Miami (FL)	W 68–55	18–2 (6–1)	KFC Yum! Center (9,887); Louisville, KY
01/29/2015; 7:00 pm	No. 8	No. 23 Syracuse	W 78–58	19–2 (7–1)	KFC Yum! Center (8,387); Louisville, KY
02/02/2015; 7:00 pm, ESPN2	No. 8	at No. 15 Duke	L 58–66	19–3 (7–2)	Cameron Indoor Stadium (5,790); Durham, NC
02/08/2015; 2:00 pm	No. 8	Pittsburgh	W 48–35	20–3 (8–2)	KFC Yum! Center (13,656); Louisville, KY
02/12/2015; 7:00 pm	No. 9	at Clemson	W 81–49	21–3 (9–2)	Littlejohn Coliseum (1,394); Clemson, SC
02/15/2015; 1:00 pm, ESPN2	No. 9	No. 17 North Carolina	W 75–66	22–3 (10–2)	KFC Yum! Center (13,115); Louisville, KY
02/19/2015; 7:00 pm	No. 8	at Virginia Tech	W 69–49	23–3 (11–2)	Cassell Coliseum (1,573); Blacksburg, VA
02/23/2015; 7:00 pm, ESPN2	No. 8	at No. 4 Notre Dame	L 52–68	23–4 (11–3)	Edmund P. Joyce Center (8,911); South Bend, IN
02/26/2015; 7:00 pm	No. 8	Boston College	W 77–60	24–4 (12–3)	KFC Yum! Center (10,488); Louisville, KY
03/01/2015; 1:00 pm, RSN	No. 8	at Virginia	L 59–75	24–5 (12–4)	John Paul Jones Arena (3,744); Charlottesville, VA
2015 ACC Tournament
03/06/2015; 8:00 pm, RSN	No. 10	vs. No. 16 North Carolina; Quarterfinals	W 77–75 ^{OT}	25–5	Greensboro Coliseum (5,848); Greensboro, NC
03/07/2015; 2:30 pm, ESPNU	No. 10	vs. No. 7 Florida State; Semifinals	L 51–66	25–6	Greensboro Coliseum (7,108); Greensboro, NC
NCAA Women's Tournament
03/21/2015*; 4:00 pm, ESPN2	No. 8	vs. BYU; First Round	W 86–53	26–6	USF Sun Dome (5,560); Tampa, FL
03/23/2015*; 9:00 pm, ESPN2	No. 8	at No. 25 South Florida; Second Round	W 60–52	27–6	USF Sun Dome (5,014); Tampa, FL
03/28/2015*; 2:30 pm, ESPN	No. 8	vs. Dayton; Sweet Sixteen	L 66–82	27–7	Times Union Center (8,259); Albany, NY
*Non-conference game. ^{#}Rankings from AP Poll. (#) Tournament seedings in parentheses. All times are in Eastern.

== Rankings ==
Regular season polls
Poll	Pre- season	Week 2	Week 3	Week 4	Week 5	Week 6	Week 7	Week 8	Week 9	Week 10	Week 11	Week 12	Week 13	Week 14	Week 15	Week 16	Week 17	Week 18	Final
AP	12	12	12	7	10	10	7	7	6	4т	4	8	8	9	8	8	10	8	8
Coaches	11	10	11	7	10	10	7	6	7	4	4	8	9	8	7	9	10	8	8

Legend
	Increase in ranking
	Decrease in ranking
	No change
(RV)	Received votes
(NR)	Not ranked

== See also ==
- Louisville Cardinals women's basketball
- 2014–15 Louisville Cardinals men's basketball team
