= 2014–15 UTEP Miners women's basketball team =

Intercollegiate basketball season

2014–15 UTEP Miners women's basketball
- Conference: Conference USA
- Record: 12–16 (7–11 C-USA)
- Head coach: Keitha Adams (14th season)
- Assistant coaches: Ewa Laskowska; Bill Damuth
- Home arena: Don Haskins Center

2014–15 Conference USA women's basketball standings
	Conf.				Overall
Team	W		L	PCT	W		L	PCT
WKU †	16	–	2	.889	30	–	5	.857
Middle Tennessee	14	–	4	.778	24	–	10	.706
Southern Miss	13	–	5	.722	25	–	11	.694
Old Dominion	11	–	7	.611	21	–	13	.618
UAB	11	–	7	.611	18	–	13	.581
UTSA	11	–	7	.611	16	–	15	.516
Louisiana Tech	10	–	8	.556	16	–	15	.516
Charlotte	10	–	8	.556	15	–	17	.469
Marshall	8	–	10	.444	17	–	15	.531
Florida Atlantic	7	–	11	.389	13	–	17	.433
UTEP	7	–	11	.389	12	–	16	.429
Rice	4	–	14	.222	9	–	21	.300
North Texas	4	–	14	.222	5	–	24	.172
FIU	0	–	18	.000	3	–	26	.103
† 2015 C-USA tournament winner As of 29 March 2015; Rankings from AP poll

The 2014–15 UTEP Miners women's basketball team represented the University of Texas at El Paso during the 2014–15 NCAA Division I women's basketball season. The Miners, led by 14th year head coach Keitha Adams, played their home games at the Don Haskins Center and were members of Conference USA. They finished the season 12–16, 7–11 in C-USA play to finish in a tie for tenth place. They lost in the first round of the C-USA women's tournament to UAB.

== Roster ==
2014–15 UTEP Miners women's basketball team
Players
Coaches

Pos.	#	Name	Height	Year	Previous school	Hometown
G	2	Camesha Turner	5 ft 9 in (1.75 m)	Jr	Lincoln	Dallas, TX
G/F	4	Irene Gari	6 ft 1 in (1.85 m)	Jr	Blume	Oliva, Spain
G	5	Lulu McKinney	5 ft 7 in (1.7 m)	Fr	A&M Consolidated	Houston, TX
G	10	Stacie Telles	5 ft 7 in (1.7 m)	Sr	New Mexico JC	El Paso, TX
G	12	Sparkle Taylor	5 ft 10 in (1.78 m)	So	Northwestern HS	Flint, MI
C	13	Marta Miscenko	6 ft 3 in (1.91 m)	Fr	Northwood Temple Academy	Riga, Latvia
G	14	Marissa Rodriguez	5 ft 7 in (1.7 m)	Sr	Regan HS	San Antonio, TX
F	15	Agata Dobrowolska	6 ft 3 in (1.91 m)	Jr	Casper College	Lublin, Poland
G	24	Jenzel Nash	5 ft 7 in (1.7 m)	RS Jr	Worthing HS	Houston, TX
G	25	Anete Kirsteine	5 ft 11 in (1.8 m)	Jr	Seward County CC	Riga, Latvia
F	30	Johni Welles	6 ft 0 in (1.83 m)	Sr	Cochise College	Phoenix, AZ
F	32	Chrishauna Parker	5 ft 10 in (1.78 m)	Sr	Atascocita HS	Houston, TX
F	33	Daeshi McCants	6 ft 1 in (1.85 m)	Fr	Mayfield HS	Las Cruces, NM
F	34	Lawna Kennedy	6 ft 0 in (1.83 m)	Jr	Atlanta Metropolitan State College	Fayetteville, GA
F	40	Rudiane Eduardo	6 ft 1 in (1.85 m)	Jr	Northwest Florida State College	Lyon, France
G		Starr Breedlove (redshirt)	5 ft 6 in (1.68 m)	Sr	Louisville	Teaneck, NJ

Head coach

Keitha Adams

Assistant coach(es)

Ewa Laskowska
Bill Damuth

Legend

- (C) Team captain
- (S) Suspended
- (I) Ineligible
- (W) Walk-on
- Injured
- Current redshirt

Roster

== Schedule ==
Date time, TV	Rank^{#}	Opponent^{#}	Result	Record	Site (attendance) city, state
Exhibition
11/07/2014*; 7:00 pm		St. Mary's	W 77–50	–	Don Haskins Center (N/A); El Paso, TX
Regular Season
11/14/2014*; 5:30 pm		New Mexico State; Battle of I-10	W 78–73	1–0	Don Haskins Center (4,500); El Paso, TX
11/16/2014*; 1:00 pm		at SMU	L 59–63	1–1	Moody Coliseum (347); Dallas, TX
11/19/2014*; 7:00 pm		Northern Arizona	W 82–58	2–1	Don Haskins Center (682); El Paso, TX
11/25/2014*; 4:00 pm		vs. Kansas State; Hardwood Tournament of Hope	L 43–72	2–2	Puerto Vallarta International Convention Center (62); Puerto Vallarta, MX
11/26/2014*; 4:00 pm		vs. LSU; Hardwood Tournament of Hope			Puerto Vallarta International Convention Center; Puerto Vallarta, MX
11/27/2014*; 1:30 pm		vs. Santa Clara; Hardwood Tournament of Hope			Puerto Vallarta International Convention Center; Puerto Vallarta, MX
12/02/2014*; 7:00 pm		Eastern New Mexico	W 84–49	3–2	Don Haskins Center (1,012); El Paso, TX
12/06/2014*; 2:00 pm		Houston Baptist	L 77–88	3–3	Don Haskins Center (1,309); El Paso, TX
12/14/2014*; 2:00 pm		at New Mexico	L 57–72	3–4	The Pit (5,328); Albuquerque, NM
12/20/2014*; 2:00 pm		Prairie View A&M	W 86–48	4–4	Don Haskins Center (1,286); El Paso, TX
12/28/2014*; 2:00 pm		Alcorn State	W 63–53	5–4	Don Haskins Center (1,209); El Paso, TX
01/02/2015; 7:00 pm		North Texas	W 60–58	6–4 (1–0)	Don Haskins Center (1,702); El Paso, TX
01/04/2015; 2:00 pm		Rice	W 54–51	7–4 (2–0)	Don Haskins Center (2,042); El Paso, TX
01/08/2015; 5:30 pm		at Louisiana Tech	L 72–90	7–5 (2–1)	Thomas Assembly Center (1,808); Ruston, LA
01/10/2015; 3:00 pm		at Southern Miss	W 71–59	8–5 (3–1)	Reed Green Coliseum (1,380); Hattiesburg, MS
01/17/2015; 2:00 pm		UTSA	L 53–55	8–6 (3–2)	Don Haskins Center (1,784); El Paso, TX
01/22/2015; 7:00 pm		No. 24 WKU	L 74–80	8–7 (3–3)	Don Haskins Center (1,404); El Paso, TX
01/24/2015; 2:00 pm		Marshall	L 71–76	8–8 (3–4)	Don Haskins Center (1,744); El Paso, TX
01/29/2015; 6:00 pm		at UAB	L 52–67	8–9 (3–5)	Bartow Arena (367); Birmingham, AL
01/31/2015; 10:00 am, FSN		at Middle Tennessee	L 53–74	8–10 (3–6)	Murphy Center (4,465); Murfreesboro, TN
02/05/2015; 7:00 pm		Florida Atlantic	L 63–68	8–11 (3–7)	Don Haskins Center (1,506); El Paso, TX
02/07/2015; 2:00 pm		FIU	W 72–56	9–11 (4–7)	Don Haskins Center (1,902); El Paso, TX
02/12/2015; 5:00 pm		at Charlotte	W 75–72	10–11 (5–7)	Dale F. Halton Arena (588); Charlotte, NC
02/14/2015; 12:00 pm		at Old Dominion	L 50–79	10–12 (5–8)	Ted Constant Convocation Center (3,204); Norfolk, VA
02/21/2015; 1:00 pm		at UTSA	L 59–72	10–13 (5–9)	Convocation Center (610); San Antonio, TX
02/27/2015; 12:00 pm		Louisiana Tech; Postponed from 2/26	W 88–75	11–13 (6–9)	Don Haskins Center (1,888); El Paso, TX
03/01/2015; 2:00 pm, FSN		Southern Miss	L 60–66	11–14 (6–10)	Don Haskins Center (3,377); El Paso, TX
03/05/2015; 6:00 pm		at North Texas	W 69–61	12–14 (7–10)	The Super Pit (888); Denton, TX
03/07/2015; 1:00 pm		at Rice	L 62–79	12–15 (7–11)	Tudor Fieldhouse (747); Houston, TX
Conference USA Women's Tournament
03/11/2015; 10:00 am, ASN		vs. UAB; First Round	L 52–63	12–16	Bartow Arena (787); Birmingham, AL
*Non-conference game. ^{#}Rankings from AP Poll. (#) Tournament seedings in parentheses. All times are in Mountain Time.

== See also ==
- 2014–15 UTEP Miners basketball team
