= 2014–15 Florida Atlantic Owls women's basketball team =

Intercollegiate basketball season

2014–15 Florida Atlantic Owls women's basketball
- Conference: Conference USA
- Record: 13–17 (7–11 C-USA)
- Head coach: Kellie Lewis-Jay (3rd season)
- Assistant coaches: Harry Elifson; Fitzroy Anthony; Danielle Stoimenoff
- Home arena: FAU Arena

2014–15 Conference USA women's basketball standings
| | Conf. | | | | Overall |
| Team | W | | L | PCT | W | | L | PCT |
|---|---|---|---|---|---|---|---|---|
| WKU † | 16 | – | 2 | .889 | 30 | – | 5 | .857 |
| Middle Tennessee | 14 | – | 4 | .778 | 24 | – | 10 | .706 |
| Southern Miss | 13 | – | 5 | .722 | 25 | – | 11 | .694 |
| Old Dominion | 11 | – | 7 | .611 | 21 | – | 13 | .618 |
| UAB | 11 | – | 7 | .611 | 18 | – | 13 | .581 |
| UTSA | 11 | – | 7 | .611 | 16 | – | 15 | .516 |
| Louisiana Tech | 10 | – | 8 | .556 | 16 | – | 15 | .516 |
| Charlotte | 10 | – | 8 | .556 | 15 | – | 17 | .469 |
| Marshall | 8 | – | 10 | .444 | 17 | – | 15 | .531 |
| Florida Atlantic | 7 | – | 11 | .389 | 13 | – | 17 | .433 |
| UTEP | 7 | – | 11 | .389 | 12 | – | 16 | .429 |
| Rice | 4 | – | 14 | .222 | 9 | – | 21 | .300 |
| North Texas | 4 | – | 14 | .222 | 5 | – | 24 | .172 |
| FIU | 0 | – | 18 | .000 | 3 | – | 26 | .103 |
† 2015 C-USA tournament winner As of 29 March 2015; Rankings from AP poll

The 2014–15 Florida Atlantic Owls women's basketball team represented Florida Atlantic University during the 2014–15 NCAA Division I women's basketball season. The Owls, led by third year head coach Kellie Lewis-Jay, play their home games at FAU Arena and were members of Conference USA. They finished the season 13–17, 7–11 in C-USA play to finish in a tie for tenth place. They lost in the first round of the C-USA women's tournament to Louisiana Tech.

== Roster ==
2014–15 Florida Atlantic Owls women's basketball team
Players
Coaches

| Pos. | # | Name | Height | Year | Previous school | Hometown |
|---|---|---|---|---|---|---|
| G | 00 | Danneal Ford | 5 ft 9 in (1.75 m) | Fr | Norland | Miami, Florida |
| G | 1 | Aaliyah Dotson | 5 ft 6 in (1.68 m) | So | Canton Central Catholic HS | Massillon, OH |
| G | 2 | Shaneese Bailey | 5 ft 9 in (1.75 m) | So | University Christian School | Callahan, FL |
| G | 3 | Ro Hayes | 5 ft 7 in (1.7 m) | Fr | Viera HS | Rockledge, FL |
| F | 5 | Raven Doyle | 6 ft 2 in (1.88 m) | RS Fr | Desert Christian HS | Lancaster, CA |
| G | 10 | Morgan Robinson | 5 ft 9 in (1.75 m) | Jr | Lyman HS | Longwood, FL |
| G | 11 | Lauren Williams | 5 ft 8 in (1.73 m) | Fr | North Babylon HS | Longwood, FL |
| G/F | 13 | Kat Wright | 6 ft 0 in (1.83 m) | So | Notre Dame HS | Woodland Hills, CA |
| F | 15 | Sasha Cedeno | 6 ft 3 in (1.91 m) | Fr | Klein Oak HS | Spring, TX |
| G | 21 | Naima Hamad | 5 ft 5 in (1.65 m) | Fr | Florida Atlantic University HS | Boca Raton, Florida |
| G | 23 | Ali Gorrell | 5 ft 10 in (1.78 m) | Jr | Wyoming | Evergreen, CO |
| G | 32 | Malia Kency | 5 ft 6 in (1.68 m) | Fr | Briarwood Academy | Statesboro, GA |
| F | 50 | Melinda Meyers | 6 ft 2 in (1.88 m) | Fr | Highland HS | Gilbert, AZ |

Head coach

Kellie Lewis-Jay

Assistant coach(es)

Harry Elifson
Fitzroy Anthony
Danielle Stoimenoff

Legend

- (C) Team captain
- (S) Suspended
- (I) Ineligible
- (W) Walk-on
- Injured
- Current redshirt

Roster

== Schedule ==
| Date time, TV | Rank^{#} | Opponent^{#} | Result | Record | Site (attendance) city, state |
Exhibition
| 11/09/2014*; 2:00 pm | | Lynn | W 94–64 | – | FAU Arena (N/A); Boca Raton, Florida |
Regular season
| 11/14/2014*; 11:00 am | | at UCF | L 74–94 | 0–1 | CFE Arena (288); Orlando, FL |
| 11/16/2014*; 3:00 pm | | at Bethune-Cookman | W 88–68 | 1–1 | Moore Gymnasium (438); Daytona Beach, FL |
| 11/21/2014*; 7:00 pm | | Cleveland State | W 79–74 | 2–1 | FAU Arena (418); Boca Raton, Florida |
| 11/23/2014*; 2:00 pm | | Western Illinois | W 90–88 | 3–1 | FAU Arena (509); Boca Raton, Florida |
| 11/28/2014*; 12:00 pm | | NJIT; Thanksgiving Tournament | L 57–65 | 3–2 | FAU Arena (N/A); Boca Raton, Florida |
| 11/29/2014*; 4:30 pm | | Northeastern; Thanksgiving Tournament | W 81–74 | 4–2 | FAU Arena (N/A); Boca Raton, Florida |
| 12/06/2014*; 5:00 pm | | Webber International | W 111–76 | 5–2 | FAU Arena (499); Boca Raton, Florida |
| 12/14/2014*; 2:00 pm | | at Colorado State | L 46–59 | 5–3 | Moby Arena (923); Fort Collins, CO |
| 12/19/2014*; 8:00 pm | | at Long Beach State; Long Beach State Tournament semifinals | L 60–85 | 5–4 | Walter Pyramid (N/A); Long Beach, CA |
| 12/20/2014*; 6:00 pm | | vs. New Mexico State; Long Beach State Tournament 3rd place game | L 44–57 | 5–5 | Walter Pyramid (N/A); Long Beach, CA |
| 12/29/2014*; 7:00 pm | | UNC Wilmington | W 84–80 | 6–5 | FAU Arena (780); Boca Raton, Florida |
| 01/04/2015; 6:00 pm | | at FIU | W 79–63 | 7–5 (1–0) | FIU Arena (253); Miami, Florida |
| 01/08/2015; 7:00 pm | | UAB | W 66–56 | 8–5 (2–0) | FAU Arena (646); Boca Raton, Florida |
| 01/10/2015; 5:00 pm | | Middle Tennessee | L 69–101 | 8–6 (2–1) | FAU Arena (588); Boca Raton, Florida |
| 01/15/2015; 12:00 pm | | at WKU | L 43–80 | 8–7 (2–2) | E. A. Diddle Arena (4,733); Bowling Green, KY |
| 01/17/2015; 1:00 pm | | at Marshall | L 59–66 | 8–8 (2–3) | Cam Henderson Center (467); Huntington, WV |
| 01/24/2015; 5:00 pm | | FIU | W 77–63 | 9–8 (3–3) | FAU Arena (836); Boca Raton, Florida |
| 01/29/2015; 7:00 pm | | Charlotte | W 71–68 | 10–8 (4–3) | FAU Arena (625); Boca Raton, Florida |
| 01/31/2015; 5:00 pm | | Old Dominion | L 44–72 | 10–9 (4–4) | FAU Arena (619); Boca Raton, Florida |
| 02/05/2015; 9:00 pm | | at UTEP | W 68–63 | 11–9 (5–4) | Don Haskins Center (1,506); El Paso, TX |
| 02/08/2015; 12:00 pm, FSN | | at UTSA | L 45–68 | 11–10 (5–5) | Convocation Center (512); San Antonio, TX |
| 02/12/2015; 7:00 pm | | Louisiana Tech | L 68–73 | 11–11 (5–6) | FAU Arena (665); Boca Raton, Florida |
| 02/14/2015; 5:00 pm | | Southern Miss | L 65–67 | 11–12 (5–7) | FAU Arena (530); Boca Raton, Florida |
| 02/19/2015; 8:00 pm | | at North Texas | L 55–74 | 11–13 (5–8) | The Super Pit (720); Denton, TX |
| 02/21/2015; 3:00 pm | | at Rice | W 82–70 | 12–13 (6–8) | Tudor Fieldhouse (245); Houston, TX |
| 02/26/2015; 7:00 pm | | WKU | L 74–85 | 12–14 (6–9) | FAU Arena (603); Boca Raton, Florida |
| 02/28/2015; 5:00 pm | | Marshall | W 83–73 | 13–14 (7–9) | FAU Arena (592); Boca Raton, Florida |
| 03/05/2015; 8:00 pm | | at UAB | L 56–59 | 13–15 (7–10) | Bartow Arena (104); Birmingham, AL |
| 03/07/2015; 11:30 am | | at Middle Tennessee | L 60–73 | 13–16 (7–11) | Murphy Center (3,512); Murfreesboro, TN |
Conference USA Tournament
| 03/11/2015; 2:30 pm, ASN | | vs. Louisiana Tech; First Round | L 74–84 | 13–17 | Bartow Arena (284); Birmingham, AL |
*Non-conference game. ^{#}Rankings from AP Poll. (#) Tournament seedings in parentheses. All times are in Eastern Time.

== See also ==
- 2014–15 Florida Atlantic Owls men's basketball team
