= 2014–15 UAB Blazers women's basketball team =

Intercollegiate basketball season

2014–15 UAB Blazers women's basketball
- Conference: Conference USA
- Record: 18–13 (11–7 C-USA)
- Head coach: Randy Norton (2nd season)
- Assistant coaches: Taren Martin; Emily Hanley
- Home arena: Bartow Arena

2014–15 Conference USA women's basketball standings
	Conf.				Overall
Team	W		L	PCT	W		L	PCT
WKU †	16	–	2	.889	30	–	5	.857
Middle Tennessee	14	–	4	.778	24	–	10	.706
Southern Miss	13	–	5	.722	25	–	11	.694
Old Dominion	11	–	7	.611	21	–	13	.618
UAB	11	–	7	.611	18	–	13	.581
UTSA	11	–	7	.611	16	–	15	.516
Louisiana Tech	10	–	8	.556	16	–	15	.516
Charlotte	10	–	8	.556	15	–	17	.469
Marshall	8	–	10	.444	17	–	15	.531
Florida Atlantic	7	–	11	.389	13	–	17	.433
UTEP	7	–	11	.389	12	–	16	.429
Rice	4	–	14	.222	9	–	21	.300
North Texas	4	–	14	.222	5	–	24	.172
FIU	0	–	18	.000	3	–	26	.103
† 2015 C-USA tournament winner As of 29 March 2015; Rankings from AP poll

The 2014–15 UAB Blazers women's basketball team represented the University of Alabama at Birmingham during the 2014–15 NCAA Division I women's basketball season. The Blazers, led by second year head coach Randy Norton, played their home games at the Bartow Arena and were members of Conference USA. They finished the season 18–13, 11–7 in C-USA play to finish in a three way tie for fourth place. They advanced to the quarterfinals of the C-USA women's tournament, where they lost to Southern Miss. Despite with 18 wins. They were not invited to a postseason tournament.

== Roster ==
2014–15 UAB Blazers women's basketball team
Players
Coaches

Pos.	#	Name	Height	Year	Previous school	Hometown
F	0	Keonna Farmer	6 ft 0 in (1.83 m)	So	Auburn	Birmingham, AL
G	1	Miranda Burroughs	5 ft 3 in (1.6 m)	Sr	Kaskaskia College	Poplar Bluff, MO
G	2	Whytney Singleton	5 ft 6 in (1.68 m)	Fr	Blount HS	Mobile, AL
G	4	Bianca Dufelmeier	5 ft 6 in (1.68 m)	RS Jr	Kirkwood Community College	Canberra, Australia
G	5	Lauren McGraw	5 ft 8 in (1.73 m)	RS Jr	Memphis	Lauderhill, FL
G	11	Janeka Williams	5 ft 6 in (1.68 m)	So	East HS	Memphis, TN
F	12	Kasey Drayton	5 ft 11 in (1.8 m)	RS Fr	Lakewood HS	St. Petersburg, FL
G	14	T'erra Lewis	5 ft 6 in (1.68 m)	Fr	Robert E. Lee HS	Montgomery, AL
F	15	Brittany Winborne	6 ft 0 in (1.83 m)	Jr	Catholic HS	Baltimore, MD
G	21	Chelsee Black	5 ft 6 in (1.68 m)	Jr	Bessemer City HS	Bessemer, AL
G	22	Maya Garland	5 ft 6 in (1.68 m)	Fr	Fenwick HS	River Forest, IL
F	23	Kayla Anderson	6 ft 1 in (1.85 m)	Jr	Hoover HS	Hoover, AL
F	25	Janae Smith	6 ft 2 in (1.88 m)	Sr	Illinois State	Matteson, IL
F	34	Khoria Newman	5 ft 10 in (1.78 m)	Jr	MacArthur HS	Irving, TX
F	41	Dy'man Webb	6 ft 1 in (1.85 m)	Jr	Flint Hamady HS	Flint, MI

Head coach

Randy Norton

Assistant coach(es)

Taren Martin
Emily Hanley

Legend

- (C) Team captain
- (S) Suspended
- (I) Ineligible
- (W) Walk-on
- Injured
- Current redshirt

Roster

== Schedule ==
Date time, TV	Rank^{#}	Opponent^{#}	Result	Record	Site (attendance) city, state
Exhibition
11/05/2014*; 7:00 pm		Truman	L 61–67	–	Bartow Arena (N/A); Birmingham, AL
Regular season
11/14/2014*; 6:00 pm, ESPN3		at Florida State	L 62–92	0–1	Donald L. Tucker Center (2,687); Tallahassee, FL
11/19/2014*; 7:00 pm		Lipscomb	W 72–54	1–1	Bartow Arena (472); Birmingham, AL
11/22/2014*; 7:00 pm		Alcorn State	W 57–43	2–1	Bartow Arena (257); Birmingham, AL
11/25/2014*; 7:00 pm		at Loyola–Chicago	W 61–51	3–1	Joseph J. Gentile Arena (479); Chicago, IL
11/28/2014*; 5:30 pm		at Loyola Marymount; DoubleTree LA Thanksgiving Classic semifinals	L 61–66	3–2	Gersten Pavilion (229); Los Angeles, CA
11/29/2014*; 3:00 pm		vs. UC Irvine; DoubleTree LA Thanksgiving Classic 3rd place Game	W 69–65 ^{OT}	4–2	Gersten Pavilion (88); Los Angeles, CA
12/06/2014*; 12:30 pm		at Samford	L 41–70	4–3	Pete Hanna Center (511); Birmingham, AL
12/14/2014*; 1:00 pm		at Arizona	L 44–49	4–4	McKale Center (859); Tucson, AZ
12/19/2014*; 7:00 pm		Arkansas–Pine Bluff	W 65–56	5–4	Bartow Arena (213); Birmingham, AL
12/21/2014*; 1:00 pm		South Alabama	W 73–43	6–4	Bartow Arena (373); Birmingham, AL
12/30/2014*; 7:00 pm		Richmond	L 65–71 ^{OT}	6–5	Bartow Arena (355); Birmingham, AL
01/04/2015; 2:00 pm		Middle Tennessee	L 68–76	6–6 (0–1)	Bartow Arena (368); Birmingham, AL
01/08/2015; 6:00 pm		at Florida Atlantic	L 56–66	6–7 (0–2)	FAU Arena (646); Boca Raton, FL
01/11/2015; 11:00 am, FSN		at FIU	W 68–45	7–7 (1–2)	FIU Arena (389); Miami, FL
01/15/2015; 7:00 pm		Louisiana Tech	L 55–61	7–8 (1–3)	Bartow Arena (414); Birmingham, AL
01/17/2015; 2:00 pm		Southern Miss	W 62–49	8–8 (2–3)	Bartow Arena (462); Birmingham, AL
01/22/2015; 6:00 pm		at Charlotte	W 60–52	9–8 (3–3)	Dale F. Halton Arena (852); Charlotte, NC
01/24/2015; 1:00 pm		at Old Dominion	L 46–58	9–9 (3–4)	Ted Constant Convocation Center (2,227); Norfolk, VA
01/29/2015; 7:00 pm		UTEP	W 67–52	10–9 (4–4)	Bartow Arena (367); Birmingham, AL
01/31/2015; 2:00 pm		UTSA	W 73–57	11–9 (5–4)	Bartow Arena (422); Birmingham, AL
02/05/2015; 6:30 pm		at Louisiana Tech	W 64–56	12–9 (6–4)	Thomas Assembly Center (2,305); Ruston, LA
02/07/2015; 4:00 pm		at Southern Miss	L 39–44	12–10 (6–5)	Reed Green Coliseum (1,212); Hattiesburg, MS
02/12/2015; 7:00 pm		North Texas	W 74–40	13–10 (7–5)	Bartow Arena (474); Birmingham, AL
02/14/2015; 2:00 pm		Rice	W 75–59	14–10 (8–5)	Bartow Arena (512); Birmingham, AL
02/19/2015; 6:00 pm		at WKU	L 51–59	14–11 (8–6)	E. A. Diddle Arena (1,208); Bowling Green, KY
02/21/2015; 1:00 pm		at Marshall	L 52–71	14–12 (8–7)	Cam Henderson Center (638); Huntington, WV
02/28/2015; 7:00 pm		at Middle Tennessee	W 62–57	15–12 (9–7)	Murphy Center (4,307); Murfreesboro, TN
03/05/2015; 7:00 pm		Florida Atlantic	W 59–56	16–12 (10–7)	Bartow Arena (104); Birmingham, AL
03/07/2015; 2:00 pm		FIU	W 72–56	17–12 (11–7)	Bartow Arena (472); Birmingham, AL
Conference USA Tournament
03/11/2015; 11:00 am, ASN		vs. UTEP; First Round	W 63–52	18–12	Bartow Arena (787); Birmingham, AL
03/12/2015; 11:00 am, ASN		vs. Southern Miss; Quarterfinals	L 66–80	18–13	Bartow Arena (888); Birmingham, AL
*Non-conference game. ^{#}Rankings from AP Poll. (#) Tournament seedings in parentheses. All times are in Central Time.

== See also ==
- 2014–15 UAB Blazers men's basketball team
