= Tom Hodges (basketball) =

American basketball coach

Biographical details
- Born: January 1, 1982 (age 44)

Tom Hodges (born January 1, 1982) is an American college basketball coach and the former head coach of the women's basketball program at Morehead State University in Morehead, Kentucky. The Morehead State Eagles are members of the Ohio Valley Conference and compete in the NCAA's Division I. Hodges contract was not renewed after four seasons. He had previously been an assistant at Middle Tennessee State, from 2005 to 2010, then had a second stint with the Blue Raiders from 2014 to 2018, when he resigned to join the family business - Titan Transfer and Goggin Warehousing.

== Head coaching record ==
Record table
Season	Team	Overall	Postseason		
Morehead State University (Ohio Valley Conference) (2010–present)
2010–11	Morehead State	21–10	13–5	3rd tie	1–1 (OVC)
2011–12	Morehead State	10–19	7–9	6th tie	0–1 (OVC)
2012–13	Morehead State	9–21	5–11	5th East	
2013–14	Morehead State	12–17	6–10	6th East	
Morehead State:		52–64	26–24		
Total:		40–50			
National champion Postseason invitational champion Conference regular season champion Conference regular season and conference tournament champion Division regular season champion Division regular season and conference tournament champion Conference tournament champion
