= 2014–15 Texas Tech Lady Raiders basketball team =

Intercollegiate basketball season

2014–15 Texas Tech Lady Raiders basketball
- Conference: Big 12 Conference
- Record: 15–16 (5–13 Big 12)
- Head coach: Candi Whitaker (2nd season)
- Assistant coaches: Matt Corkery; Brandi Poole; Damitria Buchanan
- Home arena: United Supermarkets Arena

2014–15 Big 12 Conference women's basketball standings
	Conf.				Overall
Team	W		L	PCT	W		L	PCT
No. 5 Baylor †	16	–	2	.889	33	–	4	.892
Oklahoma	13	–	5	.722	21	–	12	.636
TCU	9	–	9	.500	18	–	14	.563
Oklahoma State	9	–	9	.500	20	–	12	.625
Iowa State	9	–	9	.500	18	–	13	.581
Texas	9	–	9	.500	24	–	11	.686
West Virginia	7	–	11	.389	23	–	15	.605
Kansas State	7	–	11	.389	19	–	14	.576
Kansas	6	–	12	.333	15	–	17	.469
Texas Tech	5	–	13	.278	15	–	16	.484
† 2015 Big 12 Tournament winner Rankings from AP poll

The 2014–15 Texas Tech Lady Raiders basketball team represented Texas Tech University in the 2014–15 college basketball season. It was head coach Candi Whitaker's second season at Texas Tech. The Lady Raiders, were members of the Big 12 Conference and played their home games at the United Supermarkets Arena. They finished the season 15–16, 5–13 in Big 12 play to finish in last place. They lost in the first round of Big 12 women's tournament to West Virginia.

== Rankings ==
Regular season polls
Poll	Pre- Season	Week 2	Week 3	Week 4	Week 5	Week 6	Week 7	Week 8	Week 9	Week 10	Week 11	Week 12	Week 13	Week 14	Week 15	Week 16	Week 17	Week 18	Final
AP	NR	NR	NR	NR	NR	NR	NR	NR	RV	NR	NR	NR	NR	NR	NR	NR	NR	NR	NR
Coaches	NR	NR	NR	NR	NR	NR	NR	NR	NR	NR	NR	NR	NR	NR	NR	NR	NR	NR	NR

Legend
	Increase in ranking
	Decrease in ranking
	No change
(RV)	Received votes
(NR)	Not ranked

== Before the season ==
=== Departures ===
Name	Number	Pos.	Height	Year	Hometown	Notes
Marina Lizarazu-Herrera	1	G	5'8"	Freshman	Madrid, Spain	Transferred to Iona
Jamaika Hughes	4	G	5'10"	Freshman	Fort Worth, Texas	Transferred to UT-Arlington
Diamond Lockhart	5	G	5'5"	Freshman	Lubbock, Texas	Transferred to Wichita State
Jasmine Caston	23	G	5'10"	Freshman	Plano, Texas	Transferred to Angelo State
Haley Schneider	31	C	6'5"	Senior	Lubbock, Texas	Graduated
Shauntal Nobles	33	F/C	6'3"	Senior	Haslet, Texas	Graduated
Jackie Patterson	42	F	6'1"	Senior	Frisco, Texas	Graduated

== 2014–15 media ==
=== Television & Radio information ===
Select Lady Raiders games will be shown on FSN affiliates throughout the season, including FSSW, FSSW+, and FCS Atlantic, Central, and Pacific. All games will be broadcast on the Lady Raiders Radio Network on either KLZK or KJTV.

== Roster ==
2014–15 Texas Tech Lady Raiders women's basketball team
Players
Coaches

Pos.	#	Name	Height	Year	Previous school	Hometown
G	2	Ivonne Cook-Taylor	5 ft 8 in (1.73 m)	RS So	Terra Nova	San Francisco, CA
G	3	Minta Spears	5 ft 10 in (1.78 m)	RS So	Bullard	Bullard, TX
G	4	Ryann Bowser	5 ft 8 in (1.73 m)	Jr	Holton	Holton, KS
F/C	10	Courtney Vaccher	6 ft 2 in (1.88 m)	Fr	Yorba Linda	Yorba Linda, CA
G	11	Rayven Brooks	6 ft 0 in (1.83 m)	Jr	San Ramon Dougherty	Oakland, CA
G	12	Amber Battle	5 ft 9 in (1.75 m)	Sr	Cibola	Albuquerque, NM
F/C	13	Kellyn Schneider	6 ft 5 in (1.96 m)	RS So	Monterey	Lubbock, TX
G	24	Audrisa Harrison	5 ft 10 in (1.78 m)	Sr	Coldspring	Point Blank, TX
G/F	32	Dayo Olabode	6 ft 2 in (1.88 m)	Fr	Mansfield Timberview	Arlington, TX
F	34	Paige Parliament	6 ft 1 in (1.85 m)	RS Jr	Brock	Brock, TX
F	35	Jamie Roe	5 ft 10 in (1.78 m)	RS Jr	Tuba City	Tuba City, AZ
F	41	Kelsi Baker	6 ft 0 in (1.83 m)	Sr	John Horn	Mesquite, TX
C	42	Ionna McKenzie	6 ft 2 in (1.88 m)	Fr	Dr. Phillips	Gotha, FL

Head coach

- Candi Whitaker (Valparaiso)

Assistant coach(es)

- Matt Corkery (West Texas A&M)
- Brett Schneider (West Virginia Wesleyan)
- Damitria Buchanan (Texas A&M)

Legend

- (C) Team captain
- (S) Suspended
- (I) Ineligible
- (W) Walk-on
- Injured
- Current redshirt

Roster
Last update: 2014-10-02

== Schedule ==
Date time, TV	Rank^{#}	Opponent^{#}	Result	Record	Site (attendance) city, state
Non-conference regular season
11/14/2014*; 5:30 pm		Jacksonville State	W 67–59	1–0	United Supermarkets Arena (3,033); Lubbock, TX
11/18/2014*; 7:00 pm, FSSW+		Texas State	W 81–77 ^{OT}	2–0	United Supermarkets Arena (2,901); Lubbock, TX
11/21/2014*; 7:00 pm		Arizona	W 57–54	3–0	United Supermarkets Arena (3,525); Lubbock, TX
11/23/2014*; 2:00 pm		Morgan State	W 65–57	4–0	United Supermarkets Arena (2,970); Lubbock, TX
11/28/2014*; 2:15 pm		vs. Purdue; Junkanoo Jam Freeport Division	L 53–69	4–1	St. George's High School Gymnasium (225); Grand Bahama Island
11/29/2014*; 12:00 pm		vs. NC State; Junkanoo Jam Freeport Division	L 42–75	4–2	St. George High School Gymnasium (247); Grand Bahama Island
12/03/2014*; 11:00 am		Abilene Christian	W 61–44	5–2	United Supermarkets Arena (6,477); Lubbock, TX
12/14/2014*; 3:30 pm		Texas–Pan American	W 50–42	6–2	United Supermarkets Arena (4,393); Lubbock, TX
12/19/2014*; 5:30 pm		Nicholls State; Athletes in Action Tournament	W 76–49	7–2	United Supermarkets Arena (3,958); Lubbock, TX
12/20/2014*; 2:00 pm		UTSA; Athletes in Action Tournament	W 64–48	8–2	United Supermarkets Arena (4,434); Lubbock, TX
12/21/2014*; 2:00 pm		Houston; Athletes in Action Tournament	W 60–54	9–2	United Supermarkets Arena (4,046); Lubbock, TX
12/30/2014*; 7:00 pm, FSSW+		Houston Baptist	W 60–59	10–2	United Supermarkets Arena (2,249); Lubbock, TX
Big 12 Regular Season
01/04/2015; 4:00 pm, FSN		TCU	W 52–37	11–2 (1–0)	United Supermarkets Arena (4,096); Lubbock, TX
01/07/2015; 7:00 pm		at No. 16 Oklahoma State	L 35–66	11–3 (1–1)	Gallagher-Iba Arena (2,227); Stillwater, OK
01/10/2015; 2:00 pm		Oklahoma	L 58–75	11–4 (1–2)	United Supermarkets Arena (4,629); Lubbock, TX
01/14/2015; 6:00 pm		at West Virginia	W 55–45	12–4 (2–2)	WVU Coliseum (1,011); Morgantown, WV
01/17/2015; 12:00 pm, LHN		at No. 4 Texas	L 44–55	12–5 (2–3)	Frank Erwin Center (3,638); Austin, TX
01/21/2015; 7:00 pm, FSSW+		Kansas	L 66–68	12–6 (2–4)	United Supermarkets Arena (2,908); Lubbock, TX
01/24/2015; 3:00 pm, FSN		at Oklahoma	L 64–70	12–7 (2–5)	Lloyd Noble Center (5,676); Norman, OK
01/28/2015; 7:00 pm		West Virginia	W 73–57	13–7 (3–5)	United Supermarkets Arena (3,345); Lubbock, TX
01/31/2015; 3:00 pm, FSSW		Kansas State	L 38–41	13–8 (3–6)	United Supermarkets Arena (3,597); Lubbock, TX
02/04/2015; 7:00 pm, ESPN3		at Kansas	L 67–71	13–9 (3–7)	Allen Fieldhouse (1,937); Lawrence, KS
02/08/2015; 1:00 pm, FSSW		at TCU	L 60–71	13–10 (3–8)	Student Recreation Center (1,676); Ft. Worth, TX
02/11/2015; 7:00 pm, FSSW+		Iowa State	W 71–58	14–10 (4–8)	United Supermarkets Arena (4,018); Lubbock, TX
02/15/2015; 1:00 pm, FSN		at Kansas State	W 74–68 ^{OT}	15–10 (5–8)	Bramlage Coliseum (4,654); Manhattan, KS
02/18/2015; 7:00 pm		No. 3 Baylor	L 60–67	15–11 (5–9)	United Supermarkets Arena (3,571); Lubbock, TX
02/21/2015; 3:30 pm, FSSW		Texas	L 59–62	15–12 (5–10)	United Supermarkets Arena (4,834); Lubbock, TX
02/24/2015; 7:00 pm		at Iowa State	L 47–59	15–13 (5–11)	Hilton Coliseum (10,325); Ames, IA
02/28/2015; 7:00 pm, FSSW+		Oklahoma State	L 44–47	15–14 (5–12)	United Supermarkets Arena (3,284); Lubbock, TX
03/02/2015; 7:00 pm, FSSW+		at No. 6 Baylor	L 65–75	15–15 (5–13)	Ferrell Center (7,007); Waco, TX
2015 Big 12 women's basketball tournament
03/06/2015; 8:30 pm, FCS		vs. West Virginia; First Round	L 40–59	15–16	American Airlines Center (3,363); Dallas, TX
*Non-conference game. ^{#}Rankings from AP Poll. (#) Tournament seedings in parentheses. All times are in Central Time.

== See also ==
- Texas Tech Lady Raiders basketball
- 2014–15 Texas Tech Red Raiders basketball team
