= 2014–15 Kansas State Wildcats women's basketball team =

Intercollegiate basketball season

2014–15 Kansas State Wildcats women's basketball

WNIT, Second Round
- Conference: Big 12 Conference
- Record: 19–14 (7–11 Big 12)
- Head coach: Jeff Mittie (1st season)
- Assistant coaches: Brian Ostermann; Ebony Gilliam; Claire Coggins
- Home arena: Bramlage Coliseum

2014–15 Big 12 Conference women's basketball standings
	Conf.				Overall
Team	W		L	PCT	W		L	PCT
No. 5 Baylor †	16	–	2	.889	33	–	4	.892
Oklahoma	13	–	5	.722	21	–	12	.636
TCU	9	–	9	.500	18	–	14	.563
Oklahoma State	9	–	9	.500	20	–	12	.625
Iowa State	9	–	9	.500	18	–	13	.581
Texas	9	–	9	.500	24	–	11	.686
West Virginia	7	–	11	.389	23	–	15	.605
Kansas State	7	–	11	.389	19	–	14	.576
Kansas	6	–	12	.333	15	–	17	.469
Texas Tech	5	–	13	.278	15	–	16	.484
† 2015 Big 12 Tournament winner Rankings from AP poll

The 2014–15 Kansas State Wildcats women's basketball team represented Kansas State University in the 2014–15 NCAA Division I women's basketball season. The Wildcats were led by first-year head coach Jeff Mittie. They played their home games at Bramlage Coliseum in Manhattan, Kansas and were members of the Big 12 Conference. They finished the season 19–14, 7–11 in Big 12 play to finish in a tie for seventh place. They lost in the quarterfinals of the Big 12 women's tournament, where they lost to Baylor. They were invited to the Women's National Invitation Tournament, where they defeated Akron in the first round before losing to Missouri in the second round.

== Roster ==
2014–15 Kansas State Wildcats women's basketball team
Players
Coaches

Pos.	#	Name	Height	Year	Previous school	Hometown
F	0	Jessica Sheble	6 ft 2 in (1.88 m)	So	Olathe North	Olathe, KS
G	1	Haley Texada	5 ft 6 in (1.68 m)	Sr	Wakeland	Frisco, TX
F	2	Erica Young	6 ft 2 in (1.88 m)	So	Tampa Bay Tech	Tampa, FL
G	3	Deborah Meeks	5 ft 8 in (1.73 m)	Jr	Benton Harbor; Trinity Valley CC	Benton Harbor, MI
G	11	Antoinette Taylor	5 ft 6 in (1.68 m)	Jr	West Side; State Fair CC	Gary, IN
G	12	Kelly Thomson	5 ft 9 in (1.75 m)	RS So	Riley County	Riley, KS
G	15	Heidi Brown	5 ft 10 in (1.78 m)	Sr	Southwestern Heights	Plains, KS
G	20	Bri Craig	5 ft 9 in (1.75 m)	Jr	Lincoln Northeast	Lincoln, NE
F	21	Ashley Jones	6 ft 2 in (1.88 m)	Jr	Will Rogers; Palm Beach State College	Tulsa, OK
F	22	Breanna Lewis	6 ft 5 in (1.96 m)	So	Riverside	Milwaukee, WI
G	23	Ashia Woods	5 ft 10 in (1.78 m)	Sr	Wichita Collegiate	Wichita, KS
G	24	Kindred Wesemann	5 ft 6 in (1.68 m)	So	Pleasant Hill	Pleasant Hill, MO
F	25	Stacey Malone	6 ft 1 in (1.85 m)	RS So	Robert E. Lee	Tyler, TX
G	50	Shaelyn Martin	6 ft 0 in (1.83 m)	Fr	Salinas Central	Salina, KS

Head coach

- Jeff Mittie (Missouri Western)

Assistant coach(es)

- Brian Ostermann (UW–La Crosse)
- Ebony Gilliam (TCU)
- Claire Coggins (Kansas State)

Legend

- (C) Team captain
- (S) Suspended
- (I) Ineligible
- (W) Walk-on
- Injured
- Current redshirt

Roster
Last update: 2014-11-23

== Schedule and results ==
Date time, TV	Rank^{#}	Opponent^{#}	Result	Record	Site (attendance) city, state
Exhibition
11/03/2014*; 7:00 pm, Cox Kansas		Emporia State	W 54–50	–	Bramlage Coliseum (3,835); Manhattan, KS
11/10/2014*; 7:00 pm, Cox Kansas		Newman	W 80–30	–	Bramlage Coliseum (3,521); Manhattan, KS
Regular season
11/14/2014*; 5:30 pm, K-StateHD.TV		SIU Edwardsville	W 81–55	1–0	Bramlage Coliseum (3,925); Manhattan, KS
11/18/2014*; 7:00 pm, FCS Atlantic		UMKC	W 65–36	2–0	Bramlage Coliseum (3,757); Manhattan, KS
11/21/2014*; 7:00 pm, Cox Xtra 122		Hampton	W 66–46	3–0	Bramlage Coliseum (3,764); Manhattan, KS
11/25/2014*; 5:00 pm		vs. UTEP; Hardwood Tournament of Hope	W 72–43	4–0	Puerto Vallarta International Convention Center (62); Puerto Vallarta, MX
11/26/2014*; 5:00 pm		vs. Santa Clara; Hardwood Tournament of Hope			Puerto Vallarta International Convention Center; Puerto Vallarta, MX
11/27/2014*; 5:00 pm		vs. LSU; Hardwood Tournament of Hope			Puerto Vallarta International Convention Center; Puerto Vallarta, MX
12/04/2014*; 7:00 pm, FCS Central		Texas–Arlington	W 45–41	5–0	Bramlage Coliseum (3,542); Manhattan, KS
12/08/2014*; 7:00 pm, K-StateHD.TV		William Jewell	W 66–53	6–0	Bramlage Coliseum (2,657); Manhattan, KS
12/12/2014*; 7:05 pm, Cox Kansas		at Wichita State	L 48–51	6–1	Charles Koch Arena (3,536); Wichita, KS
12/14/2014*; 1:00 pm, K-StateHD.TV		Oral Roberts	W 53–47	7–1	Bramlage Coliseum (3,793); Manhattan, KS
12/20/2014*; 1:00 pm, FCS Central		Grambling State	W 61–38	8–1	Bramlage Coliseum (3,924); Manhattan, KS
12/22/2014*; 7:00 pm, FSKC		Abilene Christian	W 68–53	9–1	Bramlage Coliseum (3,834); Manhattan, KS
12/30/2014*; 7:00 pm, K-StateHD.TV		Samford	W 60–41	10–1	Bramlage Coliseum (3,857); Manhattan, KS
01/03/2015; 1:00 pm		at Iowa State	L 55–60	10–2 (0–1)	Hilton Coliseum (7,372); Ames, IA
01/06/2015; 7:00 pm, FSKC		No. 5 Baylor	L 44–74	10–3 (0–2)	Bramlage Coliseum (3,806); Manhattan, KS
01/11/2015; 1:00 pm, FSN		Kansas; Sunflower Showdown	W 58–52	11–3 (1–2)	Bramlage Coliseum (6,362); Manhattan, KS
01/14/2015; 7:00 pm		at No. 21 Oklahoma State	L 47–69	11–4 (1–3)	Gallagher-Iba Arena (2,681); Stillwater, OK
01/17/2015; 7:00 pm, FCS Central		Iowa State	L 59–79	11–5 (1–4)	Bramlage Coliseum (7,816); Manhattan, KS
01/21/2015; 6:00 pm		at West Virginia	L 51–63	11–6 (1–5)	WVU Coliseum (1,797); Morgantown, WV
01/24/2015; 11:00 am, FSSW		at No. 3 Baylor	L 46–68	11–7 (1–6)	Ferrell Center (6,481); Waco, TX
01/28/2015; 7:00 pm, Cox Xtra 122		Oklahoma State	W 52–51 ^{OT}	12–7 (2–6)	Bramlage Coliseum (4,211); Manhattan, KS
01/31/2015; 3:00 pm, FSSW		at Texas Tech	W 41–38	13–7 (3–6)	United Supermarkets Arena (3,597); Lubbock, TX
02/04/2015; 6:00 pm, FSMW		No. 20 Texas	W 66–57	14–7 (4–6)	Bramlage Coliseum (3,845); Manhattan, KS
02/07/2015; 2:00 pm		at Oklahoma	L 58–66	14–8 (4–7)	Lloyd Noble Center (5,353); Norman, OK
02/11/2015; 7:00 pm, FCS Central		TCU	W 93–79	15–8 (5–7)	Bramlage Coliseum (4,099); Manhattan, KS
02/15/2015; 1:00 pm, FSN		Texas Tech	L 68–74 ^{OT}	15–9 (5–8)	Bramlage Coliseum (4,654); Manhattan, KS
02/18/2015; 7:00 pm, LHN		at Texas	L 58–76	15–10 (5–9)	Frank Erwin Center (2,796); Austin, TX
02/21/2015; 7:00 pm, Cox Kansas		Oklahoma	L 64–73	15–11 (5–10)	Bramlage Coliseum (5,418); Manhattan, KS
02/25/2015; 7:00 pm, ESPN3		at Kansas; Sunflower Showdown	W 55–48	16–11 (6–10)	Allen Fieldhouse (4,279); Lawrence, KS
02/28/2015; 2:00 pm		at TCU	L 47–67	16–12 (6–11)	Student Recreation Center (1,383); Fort Worth, TX
03/03/2015; 7:00 pm, FSKC		West Virginia	W 59–55	17–12 (7–11)	Bramlage Coliseum (4,043); Manhattan, KS
2015 Big 12 women's basketball tournament
03/06/2015; 6:00 pm, FCS		vs. Kansas; First Round	W 57–49	18–12	American Airlines Center (N/A); Dallas, TX
03/06/2015; 1:30 pm, FSN		vs. No. 6 Baylor; Quarterfinals	L 70–82	18–13	American Airlines Center (3,914); Dallas, TX
WNIT
03/19/2015*; 7:00 pm, K-StateHD.TV		Akron; First Round	W 86–68	19–13	Bramlage Coliseum (1,704); Manhattan, KS
03/22/2015*; 2:00 pm, K-StateHD.TV		Missouri; Second Round	L 47–68	19–14	Bramlage Coliseum (1,772); Manhattan, KS
*Non-conference game. ^{#}Rankings from AP Poll / Coaches' Poll. (#) Tournament seedings in parentheses. All times are in Central Time.

** The November 26 game vs. Santa Clara and November 27 game vs. UTEP were canceled due to a facility conflict. Both of these games were not rescheduled.

== See also ==
- 2014–15 Kansas State Wildcats men's basketball team
