= 2014–15 Oklahoma State Cowgirls basketball team =

Intercollegiate basketball season

2014–15 Oklahoma State Cowgirls basketball

NCAA women's tournament, first round
- Conference: Big 12 Conference
- Record: 20–12 (9–9 Big 12)
- Head coach: Jim Littell (4th season)
- Assistant coaches: Bill Annan (7th season); Shannon Gage (2nd season); Richard Henderson (2nd season)
- Home arena: Gallagher-Iba Arena

2014–15 Big 12 Conference women's basketball standings
	Conf.				Overall
Team	W		L	PCT	W		L	PCT
No. 5 Baylor †	16	–	2	.889	33	–	4	.892
Oklahoma	13	–	5	.722	21	–	12	.636
TCU	9	–	9	.500	18	–	14	.563
Oklahoma State	9	–	9	.500	20	–	12	.625
Iowa State	9	–	9	.500	18	–	13	.581
Texas	9	–	9	.500	24	–	11	.686
West Virginia	7	–	11	.389	23	–	15	.605
Kansas State	7	–	11	.389	19	–	14	.576
Kansas	6	–	12	.333	15	–	17	.469
Texas Tech	5	–	13	.278	15	–	16	.484
† 2015 Big 12 Tournament winner Rankings from AP poll

The 2014–15 Oklahoma State Cowgirls basketball team represented Oklahoma State University in the 2014–15 college basketball season. It was head coach Jim Littell's fourth season at Oklahoma State. The Cowgirls were members of the Big 12 Conference, and played their home games at the Gallagher-Iba Arena. They finished the season 20–12, 9–9 in Big 12 play to finish in a four-way tie for third place. They advanced to the semifinals of the Big 12 women's tournament, where they lost to Baylor. They received an at-large bid to the NCAA women's basketball tournament, where they lost in the first round to Florida Gulf Coast.

== Roster ==
2014–15 Oklahoma State Cowboys women's basketball team
Players
Coaches

Pos.	#	Name	Height	Year	Previous school	Hometown
G	0	Roshunda Johnson	5 ft 7 in (1.7 m)	So	Parkview	Little Rock, AR
G	1	Brittany Atkins	5 ft 10 in (1.78 m)	RS So	Lincoln College Prep	Kansas City, MO
F/C	3	Mandy Coleman	6 ft 3 in (1.91 m)	Fr	McNair	Stockton, CA
F	4	Liz Donohoe	6 ft 0 in (1.83 m)	RS Sr	Edmond North	Edmond, OK
G	5	Diana Omozee	5 ft 11 in (1.8 m)	So	Pflugerville	Pflugerville, TX
G	10	Sydney Walton	5 ft 8 in (1.73 m)	Fr	Perryton	Perryton, TX
G	11	Lakota Beatty	5 ft 8 in (1.73 m)	So	Anadarko	Anadarko, OK
F	12	Brianne Coffman	6 ft 3 in (1.91 m)	So	Jarrell	Jarrell, TX
G	14	Austyn Iven	5 ft 5 in (1.65 m)	So	Stillwater	Stillwater, OK
G	15	Courtney Chelf	5 ft 8 in (1.73 m)	So	Enid	Enid, OK
F	21	Rylie Swanson	5 ft 10 in (1.78 m)	Jr	Alva	Alva, OK
G	22	Brittney Martin	6 ft 0 in (1.83 m)	Jr	Syracuse	Syracuse, UT
G	23	Roddricka Patton	5 ft 4 in (1.63 m)	Jr	Neches	Palestine, TX
F	45	Katelyn Loecker	6 ft 0 in (1.83 m)	So	McPherson	McPherson, KS
C	54	Kaylee Jensen	6 ft 4 in (1.93 m)	Fr	Lindsay Holy Family	Genoa, NE
C	55	LaShawn Jones	6 ft 3 in (1.91 m)	Sr	Putnam City	Oklahoma City, OK

Head coach

- Jim Littell (Southwestern (KS))

Assistant coach(es)

- Bill Annan (Kansas State)
- Shannon Gage (Missouri State)
- Richard Henderson (Oklahoma State)

Legend

- (C) Team captain
- (S) Suspended
- (I) Ineligible
- (W) Walk-on
- Injured
- Current redshirt

Roster
Last update: 2014-10-02

== Schedule and results ==
Date time, TV	Rank^{#}	Opponent^{#}	Result	Record	Site (attendance) city, state
Exhibition
11/04/2014*; 7:00 pm	No. 21	Southwestern Oklahoma State	W 91–53	–	Gallagher-Iba Arena (1,567); Stillwater, OK
11/09/2014*; 2:00 pm	No. 21	Arkansas-Monticello	W 87–53	–	Gallagher-Iba Arena (1,429); Stillwater, OK
Non-conference regular season
11/14/2014*; 11:00 am	No. 21	Loyola Marymount	W 76–65	1–0	Gallagher-Iba Arena (5,546); Stillwater, OK
11/16/2014*; 6:00 pm	No. 21	Texas Southern	W 77–58	2–0	Gallagher-Iba Arena (1,989); Stillwater, OK
11/19/2014*; 5:00 pm, ESPN3	No. 21	at No. 11 North Carolina	L 77–79	2–1	Carmichael Arena (2,575); Chapel Hill, NC
11/22/2014*; 2:00 pm	No. 21	Missouri State	W 77–36	3–1	Gallagher-Iba Arena (2,080); Stillwater, OK
11/25/2014*; 7:00 pm	No. 20	Morgan State	W 73–43	4–1	Gallagher-Iba Arena (1,829); Stillwater, OK
11/29/2014*; 2:00 pm	No. 20	Texas State	W 64–37	5–1	Gallagher-Iba Arena (1,823); Stillwater, OK
12/02/2014*; 7:00 pm	No. 20	Arkansas–Pine Bluff	W 90–45	6–1	Gallagher-Iba Arena (1,644); Stillwater, OK
12/15/2014*; 7:00 pm	No. 19	New Orleans	W 84–33	7–1	Gallagher-Iba Arena (1,954); Stillwater, OK
12/18/2014*; 9:00 pm	No. 19	at Weber State	W 55–49	8–1	Dee Events Center (1,303); Ogden, UT
12/21/2014*; 2:00 pm, P12N	No. 19	at USC	W 66–62	9–1	Galen Center (729); Los Angeles, CA
12/29/2014*; 7:00 pm	No. 18	Northwestern State	W 89–44	10–1	Gallagher-Iba Arena (2,218); Stillwater, OK
Conference regular season
01/03/2015; 11:00 am, FSN	No. 18	at No. 6 Baylor	L 45–61	10–2 (0–1)	Ferrell Center (6,403); Waco, TX
01/07/2015; 7:00 pm	No. 16	Texas Tech	W 66–35	11–2 (1–1)	Gallagher-Iba Arena (2,227); Stillwater, OK
01/10/2015; 7:00 pm, FSSW+	No. 16	at TCU	L 66–70	11–3 (1–2)	Daniel-Meyer Coliseum (1,350); Ft. Worth, TX
01/14/2015; 7:00 pm	No. 21	Kansas State	W 69–47	12–3 (2–2)	Gallagher-Iba Arena (2,681); Stillwater, OK
01/17/2015; 1:30 pm, FS2	No. 21	West Virginia	L 49–61	12–4 (2–3)	Gallagher-Iba Arena (2,557); Stillwater, OK
01/19/2015; 3:30 pm, FS1		at Oklahoma; Bedlam Series	L 54–73	12–5 (2–4)	Lloyd Noble Center (7,111); Norman, OK
01/24/2015; 2:00 pm		TCU	L 62–71	12–6 (2–5)	Gallagher-Iba Arena (2,746); Stillwater, OK
01/28/2015; 7:00 pm, Cox Xtra		at Kansas State	L 51–52 ^{OT}	12–7 (2–6)	Bramlage Coliseum (4,211); Manhattan, KS
01/31/2015; 6:00 pm		at Iowa State	W 63–62	13–7 (3–6)	Hilton Coliseum (11,320); Ames, IA
02/04/2015; 7:00 pm		Baylor	L 52–69	13–8 (3–7)	Gallagher-Iba Arena (2,396); Stillwater, OK
02/07/2015; 7:00 pm, ESPN3		at Kansas	W 65–57	14–8 (4–7)	Allen Fieldhouse (6,385); Lawrence, KS
02/11/2015; 7:00 pm, FCS		Texas	W 66–60	15–8 (5–7)	Gallagher-Iba Arena (2,475); Stillwater, OK
02/14/2015; 2:00 pm		Iowa State	W 60–48	16–8 (6–7)	Gallagher-Iba Arena (2,934); Stillwater, OK
02/18/2015; 6:00 pm		at West Virginia	W 52–46	17–8 (7–7)	WVU Coliseum (1,407); Morgantown, WV
02/21/2015; 7:00 pm		Kansas	W 80–76	18–8 (8–7)	Gallagher-Iba Arena (2,705); Stillwater, OK
02/25/2015; 7:00 pm, LHN		at Texas	L 42–59	18–9 (8–8)	Frank Erwin Center (2,957); Austin, TX
02/28/2015; 7:00 pm, TTSN		at Texas Tech	W 47–44	19–9 (9–8)	United Spirit Arena (3,284); Lubbock, TX
03/02/2015; 7:00 pm, FSOK		Oklahoma; Bedlam Series	L 56–66	19–10 (9–9)	Gallagher-Iba Arena (4,310); Stillwater, OK
2015 Big 12 women's basketball tournament
03/07/2015; 11:00 am, FSN		vs. Iowa State; Quarterfinals	W 67–58	20–10	American Airlines Center (N/A); Dallas, TX
03/08/2015; 1:30 pm, FS1		vs. No. 6 Baylor; Semifinals	L 52–69	20–11	American Airlines Center (N/A); Dallas, TX
NCAA women's tournament
03/21/2015*; 10:00 am, ESPN2		vs. No. 20 Florida Gulf Coast; First Round	L 65–75	20–12	Donald L. Tucker Center (4,591); Tallahassee, FL
*Non-conference game. ^{#}Rankings from AP Poll. (#) Tournament seedings in parentheses. All times are in Central Time.

== Rankings ==
Regular season polls
Poll	Pre- season	Week 2	Week 3	Week 4	Week 5	Week 6	Week 7	Week 8	Week 9	Week 10	Week 11	Week 12	Week 13	Week 14	Week 15	Week 16	Week 17	Week 18	Final
AP	21	21	20	20	20т	19т	18	18	16	21	RV	NR	NR	NR	NR	RV	NR	NR	NR
Coaches	20	19	19	17	16	16	17	14	16	20	RV	NR	NR	NR	RV	NR	NR	NR	NR

Legend
	Increase in ranking
	Decrease in ranking
	No change
(RV)	Received votes
(NR)	Not ranked

== See also ==
- 2014–15 Oklahoma State Cowboys basketball team
