= 2014–15 Kansas Jayhawks women's basketball team =

Intercollegiate basketball season

2014–15 Kansas Jayhawks women's basketball
- Conference: Big 12 Conference
- Record: 15–17 (6–12 Big 12)
- Head coach: Bonnie Henrickson (11th season)
- Assistant coaches: Katie O'Connor; Mahogany Green; Steve Wallace
- Home arena: Allen Fieldhouse

2014–15 Big 12 Conference women's basketball standings
	Conf.				Overall
Team	W		L	PCT	W		L	PCT
No. 5 Baylor †	16	–	2	.889	33	–	4	.892
Oklahoma	13	–	5	.722	21	–	12	.636
TCU	9	–	9	.500	18	–	14	.563
Oklahoma State	9	–	9	.500	20	–	12	.625
Iowa State	9	–	9	.500	18	–	13	.581
Texas	9	–	9	.500	24	–	11	.686
West Virginia	7	–	11	.389	23	–	15	.605
Kansas State	7	–	11	.389	19	–	14	.576
Kansas	6	–	12	.333	15	–	17	.469
Texas Tech	5	–	13	.278	15	–	16	.484
† 2015 Big 12 Tournament winner Rankings from AP poll

The 2014–15 Kansas Jayhawks women's basketball team represented the University of Kansas in the 2014–15 NCAA Division I women's basketball season. This was head coach Bonnie Henrickson's eleventh season at Kansas. They played their home games at Allen Fieldhouse in Lawrence, Kansas and were members of the Big 12 Conference. They finished the season 15–17, 6–12 in Big 12 play to finish in ninth place. They lost in the first round of the Big 12 women's tournament to their in-state rival Kansas State.

== Roster ==
2014–15 Kansas Jayhawks women's basketball team
Players
Coaches

Pos.	#	Name	Height	Year	Previous school	Hometown
G	0	Alisa Boyd	6 ft 1 in (1.85 m)	Sr	Renaissance	Detroit, MI
G	3	Lauren Alridge	5 ft 7 in (1.7 m)	Fr	Marshfield	Marshfield, MO
F	4	Jada Brown	6 ft 0 in (1.83 m)	So	Centennial	Las Vegas, NV
F	5	Catherine (Bunny) Williams	6 ft 1 in (1.85 m)	Sr	Duncanville	Duncanville, TX
G	12	Timeka O'Neal	5 ft 4 in (1.63 m)	Jr	Raytown	Raytown, MO
F	13	Lorraine Enabulele	6 ft 0 in (1.83 m)	Fr	Notre Dame Secondary School	Ajax, ON
F	15	Chelsea Gardner	6 ft 3 in (1.91 m)	Sr	DeSoto	DeSoto, TX
G	22	Chayla Cheadle	5 ft 11 in (1.8 m)	Fr	Rock Bridge HS	Columbia, MO
G	23	Terriell Bradley	5 ft 10 in (1.78 m)	Fr	Mansfield	Arlington, TX
F	25	Caelynn Manning-Allen	6 ft 4 in (1.93 m)	So	Curie	Chicago, IL
G	32	Keyla Morgan	5 ft 8 in (1.73 m)	So	Long Beach Poly	Rancho Dominguez, CA
G	42	Natalie Knight	5 ft 7 in (1.7 m)	Sr	Olathe South	Olathe, KS

Head coach

- Bonnie Henrickson (St. Cloud State)

Assistant coach(es)

- Katie O'Connor (Virginia Tech)
- Mahogany Green (Cleveland State)
- Steve Wallace (Kansas)

Legend

- (C) Team captain
- (S) Suspended
- (I) Ineligible
- (W) Walk-on
- Injured
- Current redshirt

Roster
Last update: 2014-11-22

== Schedule and results ==
Date time, TV	Rank^{#}	Opponent^{#}	Result	Record	Site (attendance) city, state
Exhibition
11/02/2014*; 2:00 pm, JTV/ESPN3		Fort Hays State	W 73–52	–	Allen Fieldhouse (1,818); Lawrence, KS
11/09/2014*; 2:00 pm, JTV/ESPN3		Washburn	W 78–58	–	Allen Fieldhouse (1,971); Lawrence, KS
Non-Conference Games
11/16/2014*; 2:00 pm, JTV/ESPN3		South Dakota	W 68–60	1–0	Allen Fieldhouse (1,984); Lawrence, KS
11/18/2014*; 7:00 pm, JTV/ESPN3		Texas Southern	W 69–44	2–0	Allen Fieldhouse (1,723); Lawrence, KS
11/21/2014*; 6:00 pm, JTV/ESPN3		Alabama; Hall of Fame Women's Challenge	L 80–85	2–1	Allen Fieldhouse (N/A); Lawrence, KS
11/22/2014*; 4:00 pm, JTV/ESPN3		Temple; Hall of Fame Women's Challenge	W 76–56	3–1	Allen Fieldhouse (2,132); Lawrence, KS
11/23/2014*; 2:00 pm, JTV/ESPN3		Georgetown; Hall of Fame Women's Challenge	W 55–42	4–1	Allen Fieldhouse (1,885); Lawrence, KS
11/26/2014*; 8:00 pm, JTV/ESPN3		Iona	W 90–49	5–1	Allen Fieldhouse (1,611); Lawrence, KS
11/30/2014*; 12:00 pm, ESPN3		vs. No. 2 Notre Dame; Hall of Fame Women's Challenge	L 47–89	5–2	Mohegan Sun Arena (2,347); Uncasville, CT
12/04/2014*; 7:00 pm, JTV/ESPN3		Incarnate Word	W 68–46	6–2	Allen Fieldhouse (1,498); Lawrence, KS
12/07/2014*; 5:00 pm, FS1		No. 10 California	W 62–39	7–2	Allen Fieldhouse (2,355); Lawrence, KS
12/11/2014*; 6:00 pm		at Purdue	L 48–61	7–3	Mackey Arena (5,760); West Lafayette, IN
12/14/2014*; 2:00 pm, JTV/ESPN3		Arkansas State	W 62–48	8–3	Allen Fieldhouse (2,465); Lawrence, KS
12/22/2014*; 6:05 pm		at Creighton	L 81–84 ^{OT}	8–4	D. J. Sokol Arena (1,248); Omaha, NE
12/29/2014*; 7:00 pm, JTV/ESPN3		Samford	W 66–44	9–4	Allen Fieldhouse (1,978); Lawrence, KS
Big 12 Regular Season
01/03/2015; 7:00 pm, LHN		at No. 3 Texas	L 46–60	9–5 (0–1)	Frank Erwin Center (3,385); Austin, TX
01/07/2015; 7:00 pm, JTV/ESPN3		Oklahoma	L 57–69	9–6 (0–2)	Allen Fieldhouse (1,718); Lawrence, KS
01/11/2015; 1:00 pm, FSN		at Kansas State; Sunflower Showdown	L 52–58	9–7 (0–3)	Bramlage Coliseum (6,362); Manhattan, KS
01/14/2015; 7:00 pm, JTV/ESPN3		TCU	L 63–80	9–8 (0–4)	Allen Fieldhouse (1,884); Lawrence, KS
01/17/2015; 2:00 pm, JTV/ESPN3		No. 3 Baylor	L 63–71	9–9 (0–5)	Allen Fieldhouse (3,449); Lawrence, KS
01/21/2015; 7:00 pm		at Texas Tech	W 68–66	10–9 (1–5)	United Supermarkets Arena (2,908); Lubbock, TX
01/24/2015; 1:00 pm, FSN		West Virginia	W 65–59	11–9 (2–5)	Allen Fieldhouse (2,802); Lawrence, KS
01/28/2015; 7:00 pm		at Iowa State	W 61–56	12–9 (3–5)	Hilton Coliseum (10,206); Ames, IA
02/01/2015; 1:00 pm, FSN		at No. 3 Baylor	L 58–66	12–10 (3–6)	Ferrell Center (7,048); Waco, TX
02/04/2015; 7:00 pm, JTV/ESPN3		Texas Tech	W 71–67	13–10 (4–6)	Allen Fieldhouse (1,937); Lawrence, KS
02/07/2015; 7:00 pm, JTV/ESPN3		Oklahoma State	L 57–65	13–11 (4–7)	Allen Fieldhouse (6,385); Lawrence, KS
02/10/2015; 6:00 pm		at West Virginia	L 56–59	13–12 (4–8)	WVU Coliseum (1,563); Morgantown, WV
02/14/2015; 7:00 pm, JTV/ESPN3		Texas	L 63–74	13–13 (4–9)	Allen Fieldhouse (3,201); Lawrence, KS
02/17/2015; 7:00 pm		at TCU	L 67–73	13–14 (4–10)	Student Recreation Center (1,708); Fort Worth, TX
02/21/2015; 7:00 pm		at Oklahoma State	L 76–80	13–15 (4–11)	Gallagher-Iba Arena (2,705); Stillwater, OK
02/25/2015; 7:00 pm, JTV/ESPN3		Kansas State; Sunflower Showdown	L 48–55	13–16 (4–12)	Allen Fieldhouse (4,279); Lawrence, KS
02/28/2015; 6:00 pm		at Oklahoma	W 65–58	14–16 (5–12)	Lloyd Noble Center (3,000); Norman, OK
03/02/2015; 7:00 pm, JTV/ESPN3		Iowa State	W 68–64	15–16 (6–12)	Allen Fieldhouse (2,384); Lawrence, KS
2015 Big 12 women's basketball tournament
03/06/2015; 6:00 pm, FCS		vs. Kansas State; First Round	L 49–57	15–17	American Airlines Center (N/A); Dallas, TX
*Non-conference game. ^{#}Rankings from AP Poll / Coaches' Poll. (#) Tournament seedings in parentheses. All times are in Central Time.

x- All JTV games will air on Metro Sports, ESPN3 and local affiliates.

== See also ==
- 2014–15 Kansas Jayhawks men's basketball team
