= 2014–15 TCU Horned Frogs women's basketball team =

Intercollegiate basketball season

2014–15 TCU Horned Frogs women's basketball

WNIT, 2nd round
- Conference: Big 12 Conference
- Record: 18–14 (9–9 Big 12)
- Head coach: Raegan Pebley (1st season)
- Assistant coaches: Hanna Howard; Edwina Brown; Crystal Robinson
- Home arena: Student Recreation Center

2014–15 Big 12 Conference women's basketball standings
	Conf.				Overall
Team	W		L	PCT	W		L	PCT
No. 5 Baylor †	16	–	2	.889	33	–	4	.892
Oklahoma	13	–	5	.722	21	–	12	.636
TCU	9	–	9	.500	18	–	14	.563
Oklahoma State	9	–	9	.500	20	–	12	.625
Iowa State	9	–	9	.500	18	–	13	.581
Texas	9	–	9	.500	24	–	11	.686
West Virginia	7	–	11	.389	23	–	15	.605
Kansas State	7	–	11	.389	19	–	14	.576
Kansas	6	–	12	.333	15	–	17	.469
Texas Tech	5	–	13	.278	15	–	16	.484
† 2015 Big 12 Tournament winner Rankings from AP poll

The 2014–15 TCU Horned Frogs women's basketball team represented Texas Christian University in the 2014–15 NCAA Division I women's basketball season. The 2014–15 season was head coach Raegan Pebley's first season at TCU. They played their home games at the Student Recreation Center in Fort Worth, Texas due to renovation at Daniel–Meyer Coliseum and are members of the Big 12 Conference. The Horned Frogs finished the season with an 18–14 record overall and a 9–9 record in conference play. Following regular season play, the team received an invitation to the 2015 Women's National Invitation Tournament advancing to second round play after defeating the Stephen F. Austin Ladyjacks. The Horned Frogs's season ended with an overtime loss to the Southern Miss Lady Eagles in the second round of the tournament.

== Roster ==
2014–15 TCU Horned Frogs women's basketball team
Players
Coaches

Pos.	#	Name	Height	Year	Previous school	Hometown
G/F	3	Veja Hamilton	5 ft 10 in (1.78 m)	Jr	Klein Collins	Spring, TX
F	4	Chelsea Prince	5 ft 11 in (1.8 m)	Sr	Dunbar	Ft. Worth, TX
F	11	Taylor Manning-Drake	6 ft 4 in (1.93 m)	Fr	Montclair	Montclair, NJ
C	13	Klara Bradshaw	6 ft 6 in (1.98 m)	So	Rains	Emory, TX
G	14	Zahna Medley	5 ft 6 in (1.68 m)	Jr	Springfield	Springfield, IL
G/F	15	Jada Butts	5 ft 8 in (1.73 m)	So	Lewisville	Lewisville, TX
F	21	Sydney Coleman	6 ft 1 in (1.85 m)	Fr	Cypress Ranch	Cypress, TX
G	23	AJ Alix	5 ft 6 in (1.68 m)	RS Fr	Bellaire	Bellaire, TX
G	24	Natalie Ventress	5 ft 10 in (1.78 m)	Sr	North Crowley	Ft. Worth, TX
F	32	Caitlin Diaz	6 ft 1 in (1.85 m)	Jr	Tomball	Houston, TX
G	33	Donielle Breaux	5 ft 10 in (1.78 m)	Sr	Elkins; Kansas	Missouri City, TX
G	34	Alexia Standish	5 ft 8 in (1.73 m)	Jr	Colleyville Heritage; Texas A&M	Colleyville, TX
F	45	Aiche Ndao	6 ft 3 in (1.91 m)	Jr	Collin College	Mbour, Senegal
C	55	Carol Willie	6 ft 2 in (1.88 m)	So	Cypress	Houston, TX

Head coach

- Raegan Pebley (Colorado)

Assistant coach(es)

- Hanna Howard (Portland)
- Edwina Brown (Texas)
- Crystal Robinson (SE Oklahoma State)

Legend

- (C) Team captain
- (S) Suspended
- (I) Ineligible
- (W) Walk-on
- Injured
- Current redshirt

== Schedule and results ==
Date time, TV	Rank^{#}	Opponent^{#}	Result	Record	Site (attendance) city, state
Exhibition
11/09/2014*; 2:00 pm		Texas Wesleyan	W 86–40	–	Student Recreation Center (N/A); Ft. Worth, TX
Non-Conference Games
11/14/2014*; 7:00 pm		Houston Baptist	W 87–64	1–0	Student Recreation Center (1,344); Ft. Worth, TX
11/16/2014*; 1:00 pm		at Georgia	L 53–62	1–1	Stegeman Coliseum (2,994); Athens, GA
11/19/2014*; 12:00 pm		SMU	W 72–62	2–1	Student Recreation Center (1,379); Ft. Worth, TX
11/22/2014*; 7:00 pm		Texas Southern	W 69–52	3–1	Student Recreation Center (1,345); Ft. Worth, TX
11/28/2014*; 6:00 pm		vs. Colorado State; OMNI Classic semifinals	L 62–76	3–2	Coors Events Center (2,190); Boulder, CO
11/29/2014*; 6:00 pm		vs. Missouri State; OMNI Classic consolation round	W 82–68	4–2	Coors Events Center (N/A); Boulder, CO
12/07/2014*; 1:00 pm, FSN		No. 5 Texas A&M	L 71–82	4–3	Student Recreation Center (1,350); Ft. Worth, TX
12/11/2014*; 7:00 pm		Lamar	W 72–68	5–3	Student Recreation Center (1,332); Ft. Worth, TX
12/13/2014*; 2:00 pm		Prairie View A&M	W 56–50	6–3	Student Recreation Center (1,350); Ft. Worth, TX
12/21/2014*; 1:00 pm		Sam Houston State	W 79–55	7–3	Student Recreation Center (1,350); Ft. Worth, TX
12/30/2014*; 7:00 pm		UC Irvine	W 78–56	8–3	Student Recreation Center (1,350); Ft. Worth, TX
Conference Games
01/04/2015; 4:00 pm, FSN		at Texas Tech	L 37–52	8–4 (0–1)	United Spirit Arena (4,096); Lubbock, TX
01/07/2015; 7:00 pm		Iowa State	W 86–84	9–4 (1–1)	Student Recreation Center (1,350); Ft. Worth, TX
01/10/2015; 5:00 pm, FSSW+		No. 16 Oklahoma State	W 70–66	10–4 (2–1)	Student Recreation Center (1,350); Ft. Worth, TX
01/14/2015; 7:00 pm, ESPN3		at Kansas	W 80–63	11–4 (3–1)	Allen Fieldhouse (1,884); Lawrence, KS
01/17/2015; 1:00 pm, FSSW		Oklahoma	L 81–97	11–5 (3–2)	Student Recreation Center (1,350); Ft. Worth, TX
01/21/2015; 7:00 pm		at Iowa State	L 62–80	11–6 (3–3)	Hilton Coliseum (9,684); Ames, IA
01/24/2015; 2:00 pm		at Oklahoma State	W 71–62	12–6 (4–3)	Gallagher-Iba Arena (2,746); Stillwater, OK
01/27/2015; 7:00 pm		No. 3 Baylor	L 67–89	12–7 (4–4)	Student Recreation Center (1,806); Ft. Worth, TX
02/01/2015; 12:00 pm, FSSW+		No. 14 Texas	W 64–59	13–7 (5–4)	Student Recreation Center (1,655); Ft. Worth, TX
02/04/2015; 6:00 pm		at West Virginia	L 71–76	13–8 (5–5)	WVU Coliseum (1,052); Morgantown, WV
02/08/2015; 1:00 pm, FSSW		Texas Tech	W 71–60	14–8 (6–5)	Student Recreation Center (1,676); Ft. Worth, TX
02/11/2015; 7:00 pm, FCS Central		at Kansas State	L 79–93	14–9 (6–6)	Bramlage Coliseum (4,099); Manhattan, KS
02/14/2015; 3:00 pm, SSTV		at Oklahoma	L 54–77	14–10 (6–7)	Lloyd Noble Center (6,475); Norman, OK
02/17/2015; 7:00 pm, FSSW+		Kansas	W 73–67	15–10 (7–7)	Student Recreation Center (1,708); Ft. Worth, TX
02/21/2015; 7:00 pm, FSSW+		at No. 3 Baylor	L 75–91	15–11 (7–8)	Ferrell Center (9,521); Waco TX
02/24/2015; 7:00 pm, FSSW+		West Virginia	W 73–63	16–11 (8–8)	Student Recreation Center (1,351); Ft. Worth, TX
02/28/2015; 2:00 pm		Kansas State	W 67–47	17–11 (9–8)	Student Recreation Center (1,383); Ft. Worth, TX
03/03/2015; 7:00 pm, LHN		at Texas	L 45–79	17–12 (9–9)	Frank Erwin Center (3,125); Austin, TX
2015 Big 12 women's basketball tournament
03/07/2015; 8:30 pm, FSN		vs. Texas; Quarterfinals	L 61–67	17–13	American Airlines Center (4,224); Dallas, TX
Women's National Invitation Tournament (WNIT)
03/19/2015; 7:00 pm		Stephen F. Austin; First Round	W 85–80	18–13	Student Recreation Center (722); Fort Worth, TX
03/22/2015; 2:00 pm		at Southern Mississippi; Second Round	L 73–77 ^{OT}	18–14	Reed Green Coliseum (1,726); Hattiesburg, MS
*Non-conference game. ^{#}Rankings from AP Poll / Coaches' Poll. (#) Tournament seedings in parentheses. All times are in Central Time.

== See also ==
- 2014–15 TCU Horned Frogs men's basketball team
