= 2014–15 Iowa State Cyclones women's basketball team =

Intercollegiate basketball season

2014–15 Iowa State Cyclones women's basketball

Cyclone Challenge Champions

NCAA women's tournament, first round
- Conference: Big 12 Conference
- Record: 18–13 (9–9 Big 12)
- Head coach: Bill Fennelly (20th season)
- Assistant coaches: Jodi Steyer; Billy Fennelly; Latoja Schaben
- Home arena: Hilton Coliseum

2014–15 Big 12 Conference women's basketball standings
	Conf.				Overall
Team	W		L	PCT	W		L	PCT
No. 5 Baylor †	16	–	2	.889	33	–	4	.892
Oklahoma	13	–	5	.722	21	–	12	.636
TCU	9	–	9	.500	18	–	14	.563
Oklahoma State	9	–	9	.500	20	–	12	.625
Iowa State	9	–	9	.500	18	–	13	.581
Texas	9	–	9	.500	24	–	11	.686
West Virginia	7	–	11	.389	23	–	15	.605
Kansas State	7	–	11	.389	19	–	14	.576
Kansas	6	–	12	.333	15	–	17	.469
Texas Tech	5	–	13	.278	15	–	16	.484
† 2015 Big 12 Tournament winner Rankings from AP poll

The 2014–15 Iowa State Cyclones women's basketball team represented Iowa State University in the 2014–15 NCAA Division I women's basketball season. This was head coach Bill Fennelly's 20th season at Iowa State. The Cyclones were members of the Big 12 Conference and played their home games at the Hilton Coliseum. They finished the season 18–13, 9–9 in Big 12 play to finish in a four-way tie for third place. They lost in the quarterfinals of the Big 12 women's tournament to Oklahoma State. They received an at-large bid to the NCAA women's basketball tournament, where they lost to Dayton in the first round.

== Radio ==
All Cyclones games were carried on the Iowa State Cyclone Radio Network. Not all affiliates carried women's basketball, and some affiliates only carried select games.

== Roster ==
2014–15 Iowa State Cyclones women's basketball team
Players
Coaches

Pos.	#	Name	Height	Year	Previous school	Hometown
G	2	Nakiah Bell	5 ft 5 in (1.65 m)	Fr	Incarnate Word Academy	Florissant, MO
G	3	Emily Durr	6 ft 0 in (1.83 m)	Fr	Notre Dame	Utica, NY
G	4	Nikki Moody	5 ft 8 in (1.73 m)	Sr	Euless Trinity	Euless, TX
G	11	Jadda Buckley	5 ft 8 in (1.73 m)	RS So	Mason City	Mason City, IA
G	12	Seanna Johnson	5 ft 10 in (1.78 m)	So	DeLaSalle	Brooklyn Park, MN
G	15	Nicole "Kidd" Blaskowsky	5 ft 7 in (1.7 m)	Jr	Austin	Sugar Land, TX
G/F	22	Brynn Williamson	5 ft 11 in (1.8 m)	Sr	Staley	Kansas City, MO
G	25	Lexi Albrecht	5 ft 10 in (1.78 m)	So	Carroll Kuemper	Carroll, IA
G/F	32	Fallon Ellis	5 ft 11 in (1.8 m)	Sr	Westbury Christian	Missouri City, TX
F/C	34	Madison Baier	6 ft 4 in (1.93 m)	Jr	South Tama	Tama, IA
F	35	Jordan Jensen	6 ft 2 in (1.88 m)	So	Mountain View	Gilbert, AZ
G	42	Blaire Thomas	5 ft 11 in (1.8 m)	Fr	Waterloo West	Waterloo, IA
C	44	Bryanna Fernstrom	6 ft 5 in (1.96 m)	Fr	Chisago Lakes	Center City, MN

Head coach

- Bill Fennelly (William Penn)

Assistant coach(es)

- Jodi Steyer (Colorado State)
- Billy Fennelly (Iowa State)
- Latoja Schaben (Toledo)

Legend

- (C) Team captain
- (S) Suspended
- (I) Ineligible
- (W) Walk-on
- Injured
- Current redshirt

Roster

== Schedule and results ==
Date time, TV	Rank^{#}	Opponent^{#}	Result	Record	Site (attendance) city, state
Exhibition
11/04/2014*; 7:00 pm, Cyclones.tv		William Penn	W 99–53	–	Hilton Coliseum (9,476); Ames, IA
11/09/2014*; 1:00 pm, Cyclones.tv		Winona State	W 64–29	–	Hilton Coliseum (N/A); Ames, IA
Non-conference regular season
11/16/2014*; 12:30 pm, Cyclones.tv		USC Upstate	W 98–76	1–0	Hilton Coliseum (9,656); Ames, IA
11/18/2014*; 7:00 pm, Cyclones.tv		Drake	W 84–67	2–0	Hilton Coliseum (9,873); Ames, IA
11/23/2014*; 1:00 pm, Cyclones.tv		Cincinnati	W 85–54	3–0	Hilton Coliseum (6,836); Ames, IA
11/28/2014*; 2:00 pm, TheW.tv		vs. Wyoming; St. Mary's Thanksgiving Tournament	W 84–63	4–0	McKeon Pavilion (151); Moraga, CA
11/29/2014*; 4:30 pm, TheW.tv		at Saint Mary's; St. Mary's Thanksgiving Tournament	L 63–67	4–1	McKeon Pavilion (379); Moraga, CA
12/07/2014*; 1:00 pm, Cyclones.tv		Stony Brook	W 74–64	5–1	Hilton Coliseum (10,978); Ames, IA
12/11/2014*; 7:00 pm, BTN		at No. 24 Iowa; Iowa Corn Cy-Hawk Series	L 67–76	5–2	Carver-Hawkeye Arena (4,902); Iowa City, IA
12/14/2014*; 12:00 pm, Cyclones.tv		Arkansas–Pine Bluff	W 82–56	6–2	Hilton Coliseum (9,755); Ames, IA
12/21/2014*; 1:00 pm, Cyclones.tv		Fairfield	W 76–63	7–2	Hilton Coliseum (6,761); Ames, IA
12/29/2014*; 7:30 pm, Cyclones.tv		Howard; Cyclone Challenge semifinals	W 90–44	8–2	Hilton Coliseum (6,957); Ames, IA
12/30/2014*; 7:30 pm, Cyclones.tv		UC Riverside; Cyclone Challenge championship	W 71–54	9–2	Hilton Coliseum (6,810); Ames, IA
Conference season
01/03/2015; 1:00 pm, Cyclones.tv		Kansas State	W 60–55	10–2 (1–0)	Hilton Coliseum (7,372); Ames, IA
01/07/2015; 7:00 pm		at TCU	L 84–86	10–3 (1–1)	Student Recreation Center (1,350); Ft. Worth, TX
01/10/2015; 11:00 am, FSN		No. 3 Texas	W 59–57	11–3 (2–1)	Hilton Coliseum (7,928); Ames, IA
01/13/2015; 6:30 pm, FSSW		at No. 3 Baylor	L 47–79	11–4 (2–2)	Ferrell Center (6,095); Waco, TX
01/17/2015; 7:00 pm, FCS Central		at Kansas State	W 79–59	12–4 (3–2)	Bramlage Coliseum (7,816); Manhattan, KS
01/21/2015; 7:00 pm, Cyclones.tv		TCU	W 80–62	13–4 (4–2)	Hilton Coliseum (9,684); Ames, IA
01/25/2015; 3:30 pm, FS1		at No. 8 Texas	W 58–57	14–4 (5–2)	Frank Erwin Center (3,234); Austin, TX
01/28/2015; 7:00 pm, Cyclones.tv		Kansas	L 56–61	14–5 (5–3)	Hilton Coliseum (10,206); Ames, IA
01/31/2015; 6:00 pm, Cyclones.tv		Oklahoma State	L 62–63	14–6 (5–4)	Hilton Coliseum (11,320); Ames, IA
02/04/2015; 10:30 am, SSTV		at Oklahoma	L 66–75	14–7 (5–5)	Lloyd Noble Center (6,042); Norman, OK
02/07/2015; 6:00 pm, Cyclones.tv		West Virginia	W 61–43	15–7 (6–5)	Hilton Coliseum (11,384); Ames, IA
02/11/2015; 7:00 pm		at Texas Tech	L 58–71	15–8 (6–6)	United Supermarkets Arena (4,018); Lubbock, TX
02/14/2015; 7:00 pm		at Oklahoma State	L 48–60	15–9 (6–7)	Gallagher-Iba Arena (2,934); Stillwater, OK
02/17/2015; 7:00 pm, FS1		Oklahoma	W 84–76 ^{OT}	16–9 (7–7)	Hilton Coliseum (9,964); Ames, IA
02/21/2015; 11:00 am, FSN		at West Virginia	L 52–54	16–10 (7–8)	WVU Coliseum (2,076); Morgantown, WV
02/24/2015; 7:00 pm, Cyclones.tv		Texas Tech	W 59–47	17–10 (8–8)	Hilton Coliseum (10,325); Ames, IA
02/28/2015; 3:00 pm, FSN		No. 3 Baylor	W 76–71	18–10 (9–8)	Hilton Coliseum (12,107); Ames, IA
03/02/2015; 7:00 pm, ESPN3		at Kansas	L 64–68	18–11 (9–9)	Allen Fieldhouse (2,384); Lawrence, KS
2015 Big 12 women's basketball tournament
03/07/2015; 1:30 pm, FSN		vs. Oklahoma State; Quarterfinals	L 58–67	18–12	American Airlines Center (N/A); Dallas, TX
NCAA women's tournament
03/20/2015*; 11:00 am, ESPN2		vs. Dayton; First Round	L 66–78	18–13	Memorial Coliseum (N/A); Lexington, KY
*Non-conference game. ^{#}Rankings from AP Poll. (#) Tournament seedings in parentheses. All times are in Central Time.

== Rankings ==
Ranking movement Legend: ██ Improvement in ranking. ██ Decrease in ranking. ██NR = Not ranked. RV = Receiving votes.
Poll	Pre- season	Week 2	Week 3	Week 4	Week 5	Week 6	Week 7	Week 8	Week 9	Week 10	Week 11	Week 12	Week 13	Week 14	Week 15	Week 16	Week 17	Week 18	Final
AP	RV	RV	RV	NR	NR	NR	NR	NR	NR	RV	RV	RV	NR	NR	NR	NR	NR	NR	NR
Coaches	RV	NR	NR	NR	NR	NR	NR	NR	NR	NR	RV	RV	NR	NR	NR	NR	NR	NR	NR

== See also ==
- 2014–15 Iowa State Cyclones men's basketball team
