= 2014–15 Baylor Lady Bears basketball team =

Intercollegiate basketball season

2014–15 Baylor Lady Bears basketball

Big 12 Tournament champions Big 12 regular season champions

NCAA tournament, Elite Eight
- Conference: Big 12 Conference

Ranking
- Coaches: No. 6
- AP: No. 5
- Record: 33–4 (16–2 Big 12)
- Head coach: Kim Mulkey (14th season)
- Assistant coaches: Bill Brock; Sytia Messer; Toyelle Wilson
- Home arena: Ferrell Center

2014–15 Big 12 Conference women's basketball standings
	Conf.				Overall
Team	W		L	PCT	W		L	PCT
No. 5 Baylor †	16	–	2	.889	33	–	4	.892
Oklahoma	13	–	5	.722	21	–	12	.636
TCU	9	–	9	.500	18	–	14	.563
Oklahoma State	9	–	9	.500	20	–	12	.625
Iowa State	9	–	9	.500	18	–	13	.581
Texas	9	–	9	.500	24	–	11	.686
West Virginia	7	–	11	.389	23	–	15	.605
Kansas State	7	–	11	.389	19	–	14	.576
Kansas	6	–	12	.333	15	–	17	.469
Texas Tech	5	–	13	.278	15	–	16	.484
† 2015 Big 12 Tournament winner Rankings from AP poll

The 2014–15 Baylor Lady Bears basketball team represented Baylor University in the 2014–15 NCAA Division I women's basketball season. Returning as head coach is Hall of Famer Kim Mulkey for her 14th season. The team played its home games at the Ferrell Center in Waco, Texas and were members of the Big 12 Conference. They finished the season 33–4, 16–2 in Big 12 to win the Big 12 regular season title. They also won the Big 12 women's tournament to earn an automatic trip to the NCAA women's tournament, where they defeated Northwestern State in the first round, Arkansas in the second round and Iowa in the sweet sixteen before losing to Notre Dame in the elite eight.

== Before the season ==
=== Departures ===
Name	Number	Pos.	Height	Year	Hometown	Notes
Odyssey Sims	0	G	5'9"	Senior	Irving, TX	Graduated; Entered 2014 WNBA draft; Drafted #2 Overall by the Tulsa Shock
Breanna Hayden	1	G	5'8"	Freshman	Dallas, TX	Transferred to Alabama
Mariah Chandler	11	F	6'2"	Graduate	Atlanta, GA	Graduated
Makenzie Robertson	14	G	5'9"	Senior	McGregor, TX	Graduated

=== Recruiting ===
Name	Pos.	Height	Year	Hometown	Notes
Dekeiya Cohen	G	6'2"	Freshman	Charleston, SC	High School Graduate
Kristy Wallace	G	5'11"	Freshman	Loganholme, Queensland, Australia	High School Graduate
Micayla Buckner	P	6'3"	Freshman	Garland, TX	High School Graduate
Alexis Jones	G	5'8"	Junior	Irving, TX	Transferred from Duke

== Roster ==
2014–15 Baylor Bears women's basketball team
Players
Coaches

Pos.	#	Name	Height	Year	Previous school	Hometown
F	1	Dekeiya Cohen	6 ft 2 in (1.88 m)	Fr	West Ashley	Charleston, SC
G	2	Niya Johnson	5 ft 8 in (1.73 m)	Jr	P.K. Yonge Development Research	Gainesville, FL
F	3	Chardonae Fuqua'	6 ft 0 in (1.83 m)	Jr	Hoover	Birmingham, AL
G	4	Kristy Wallace	5 ft 11 in (1.8 m)	Fr	John Paul College	Loganholme, Queensland, Australia
G	12	Alexis Prince	6 ft 1 in (1.85 m)	RS So	Edgewater	Orlando, FL
F	13	Nina Davis	6 ft 0 in (1.83 m)	So	Central High School	Memphis, TN
G	20	Imani Wright	5 ft 9 in (1.75 m)	So	Liberty-Eylau	Hooks, TX
F/C	22	Sune Agbuke	6 ft 4 in (1.93 m)	Sr	Cornerstone Christian	San Antonio, TX
G	24	Ieshia Small	6 ft 0 in (1.83 m)	So	Florida	Tallahassee, FL
G	30	Alexis Jones (redshirt)	5 ft 8 in (1.73 m)	Jr	MacArthur; Duke	Irving, TX
F/C	34	Micayla Buckner	6 ft 3 in (1.91 m)	Fr	Naaman Forest	Garland, TX
F/C	44	Kristina Higgins	6 ft 5 in (1.96 m)	Jr	Chapin	El Paso, TX
F/C	55	Khadijiah Cave	6 ft 2 in (1.88 m)	So	Lucy Laney	Augusta, GA

Head coach

- Kim Mulkey (Louisiana Tech)

Assistant coach(es)

- Bill Brock (SE Oklahoma State)
- Sytia Messer (Arkansas)
- Toyelle Wilson (Manhattan)

Legend

- (C) Team captain
- (S) Suspended
- (I) Ineligible
- (W) Walk-on
- Injured
- Current redshirt

Roster
Last update: 2014-10-01

== Rankings ==
Regular season polls
Poll	Pre- season	Week 2	Week 3	Week 4	Week 5	Week 6	Week 7	Week 8	Week 9	Week 10	Week 11	Week 12	Week 13	Week 14	Week 15	Week 16	Week 17	Week 18	Final
AP	8	8	13	11	9	9	6	6	5	3	3	3	3	3	3	3	6	5	5
Coaches	9	9	13	11	9	9	6	5	5	3	3	3	3	3	3	3	7	6	6

Legend
	Increase in ranking
	Decrease in ranking
	No change
(RV)	Received votes
(NR)	Not ranked

== Schedule ==
Date time, TV	Rank^{#}	Opponent^{#}	Result	Record	Site (attendance) city, state
Exhibition
11/04/2014*; 7:00 pm	No. 8	Midwestern State	W 99–56	–	Ferrell Center (5,745); Waco, TX
11/10/2014*; 7:00 pm	No. 8	Tarleton State	W 102–41	–	Ferrell Center (5,677); Waco, TX
Non-conference Regular Season
11/14/2014*; 6:00 pm, FSSW+	No. 8	Oral Roberts	W 101–60	1–0	Ferrell Center (5,807); Waco, TX
11/17/2014*; 6:00 pm, ESPN2	No. 8	at No. 13 Kentucky	L 64–74	1–1	Rupp Arena (22,075); Lexington, KY
11/28/2014*; 7:00 pm	No. 13	Utah State; BTI Classic	W 99–43	2–1	Ferrell Center (5,754); Waco, TX
11/29/2014*; 12:00 pm	No. 13	Stetson; BTI Classic	W 96–42	3–1	Ferrell Center (5,458); Waco, TX
11/30/2014*; 2:00 pm, FSSW+	No. 13	Marist; BTI Classic	W 90–60	4–1	Ferrell Center (5,439); Waco, TX
12/03/2014*; 7:00 pm	No. 11	Texas–Pan American	W 96–42	5–1	Ferrell Center (5,541); Waco, TX
12/07/2014*; 2:00 pm	No. 11	at Ole Miss	W 96–57	6–1	Tad Smith Coliseum (2,388); Oxford, MS
12/10/2014*; 7:00 pm	No. 9	Idaho	W 88–70	7–1	Ferrell Center (5,437); Waco, TX
12/14/2014*; 2:00 pm, FSSW+	No. 9	Stephen F. Austin	W 95–57	8–1	Ferrell Center (5,947); Waco, TX
12/19/2014*; 6:00 pm	No. 9	vs. No. 19 Syracuse; Orlando Sunshine Tournament	W 74–72	9–1	Worden Arena (889); Winter Park, FL
12/20/2014*; 3:00 pm	No. 9	vs. No. 18 Michigan State; Orlando Sunshine Tournament	W 84–65	10–1	Worden Arena (755); Winter Park, FL
12/29/2014*; 7:00 pm	No. 6	Prairie View A&M	W 108–64	11–1	Ferrell Center (5,839); Waco, TX
Big 12 Regular Season
01/03/2015; 11:00 am, FSN	No. 6	No. 18 Oklahoma State	W 61–45	12–1 (1–0)	Ferrell Center (6,403); Waco, TX
01/06/2015; 7:00 pm, FSKC	No. 5	at Kansas State	W 74–44	13–1 (2–0)	Bramlage Coliseum (3,806); Manhattan, KS
01/10/2015; 2:00 pm, RTPT	No. 5	at West Virginia	W 66–62	14–1 (3–0)	WVU Coliseum (3,712); Morgantown, WV
01/13/2013; 6:30 pm, FSSW	No. 3	Iowa State	W 79–47	15–1 (4–0)	Ferrell Center (6,095); Waco, TX
01/17/2015; 2:00 pm, ESPN3	No. 3	at Kansas	W 71–63	16–1 (5–0)	Allen Fieldhouse (3,449); Lawrence, KS
01/19/2015; 5:30 pm, FS1	No. 3	No. 8 Texas	W 75–58	17–1 (6–0)	Ferrell Center (8,894); Waco, TX
01/24/2015; 11:00 am, FSSW	No. 3	Kansas State	W 68–46	18–1 (7–0)	Ferrell Center (6,481); Waco, TX
01/27/2015; 7:00 pm	No. 3	at TCU	W 89–67	19–1 (8–0)	Student Recreation Center (1,806); Ft. Worth, TX
02/01/2015; 1:00 pm, FSN	No. 3	Kansas	W 66–58	20–1 (9–0)	Ferrell Center (7,048); Waco, TX
02/04/2015; 7:00 pm	No. 3	at Oklahoma State	W 69–52	21–1 (10–0)	Gallagher-Iba Arena (2,396); Stillwater, OK
02/08/2015; 1:00 pm, ESPN2	No. 3	at No. 20 Texas	W 70–68	22–1 (11–0)	Frank Erwin Center (6,602); Austin, TX
02/11/2015; 7:00 pm, FSSW+	No. 3	Oklahoma	W 89–66	23–1 (12–0)	Ferrell Center (7,683); Waco, TX
02/15/2015; 4:00 pm, ESPN2	No. 3	West Virginia	W 79–51	24–1 (13–0)	Ferrell Center (6,762); Waco, TX
02/18/2015; 7:00 pm	No. 3	at Texas Tech	W 67–60	25–1 (14–0)	United Spirit Arena (3,571); Lubbock, TX
02/21/2015; 7:00 pm, FSSW+	No. 3	TCU	W 91–75	26–1 (15–0)	Ferrell Center (9,521); Waco, TX
02/25/2015; 7:00 pm	No. 3	at Oklahoma	L 64–68	26–2 (15–1)	Lloyd Noble Center (5,479); Norman, OK
02/28/2015; 3:00 pm, FSN	No. 3	at Iowa State	L 71–76	26–3 (15–2)	Hilton Coliseum (12,107); Ames, IA
03/02/2015; 7:00 pm, FSSW+	No. 6	Texas Tech	W 75–65	27–3 (16–2)	Ferrell Center (7,007); Waco, TX
2015 Big 12 women's basketball tournament
03/07/2015; 1:30 pm, FSN	No. 6	vs. Kansas State; Quarterfinals	W 82–70	28–3	American Airlines Center (3,914); Dallas, TX
03/08/2015; 1:30 pm, FS1	No. 6	vs. Oklahoma State; Semifinals	W 69–52	29–3	American Airlines Center (N/A); Dallas, TX
03/09/2015; 8:00 pm, FS1	No. 5	vs. Texas; Championship Game	W 75–64	30–3	American Airlines Center (4,804); Dallas, TX
NCAA women's tournament
03/20/2015*; 1:30 pm, ESPN2	No. 5	Northwestern State; First Round	W 77–36	31–3	Ferrell Center (4,775); Waco, TX
03/22/2015*; 1:30 pm, ESPN2	No. 5	Arkansas; Second Round	W 73–44	32–3	Ferrell Center (4,593); Waco, TX
03/27/2015*; 6:30 pm, ESPN2	No. 5	vs. No. 18 Iowa; Sweet Sixteen	W 81–66	33–3	Chesapeake Energy Arena (N/A); Oklahoma City, OK
03/29/2015*; 7:30 pm, ESPN	No. 5	vs. No. 2 Notre Dame; Elite Eight	L 68–77	33–4	Chesapeake Energy Arena (3,329); Oklahoma City, OK
*Non-conference game. ^{#}Rankings from AP Poll. (#) Tournament seedings in parentheses. All times are in Central Time.

== See also ==
- 2014–15 Baylor Bears basketball team
