= 2014–15 Texas Longhorns women's basketball team =

Intercollegiate basketball season

2014–15 Texas Longhorns women's basketball

NCAA tournament, Sweet Sixteen
- Conference: Big 12 Conference
- Record: 24–11 (9–9 Big 12)
- Head coach: Karen Aston (3rd season)
- Assistant coaches: Travis Mays; Jalie Mitchell; George Washington
- Home arena: Frank Erwin Center

2014–15 Big 12 Conference women's basketball standings
| | Conf. | | | | Overall |
| Team | W | | L | PCT | W | | L | PCT |
|---|---|---|---|---|---|---|---|---|
| No. 5 Baylor † | 16 | – | 2 | .889 | 33 | – | 4 | .892 |
| Oklahoma | 13 | – | 5 | .722 | 21 | – | 12 | .636 |
| TCU | 9 | – | 9 | .500 | 18 | – | 14 | .563 |
| Oklahoma State | 9 | – | 9 | .500 | 20 | – | 12 | .625 |
| Iowa State | 9 | – | 9 | .500 | 18 | – | 13 | .581 |
| Texas | 9 | – | 9 | .500 | 24 | – | 11 | .686 |
| West Virginia | 7 | – | 11 | .389 | 23 | – | 15 | .605 |
| Kansas State | 7 | – | 11 | .389 | 19 | – | 14 | .576 |
| Kansas | 6 | – | 12 | .333 | 15 | – | 17 | .469 |
| Texas Tech | 5 | – | 13 | .278 | 15 | – | 16 | .484 |
† 2015 Big 12 Tournament winner Rankings from AP poll

The 2014–15 Texas Longhorns women's basketball team represented the University of Texas at Austin in the 2014–15 college basketball season. This was head coach Karen Aston's third season at Texas. The Longhorns were members of the Big 12 Conference and played their home games at the Frank Erwin Center. They finished the season 24–11, 9–9 in Big 12 play, to finish in a four-way tie for third place. They advanced to the championship game of the Big 12 women's basketball tournament, where they lost to Baylor. They received an at-large bid to the NCAA women's basketball tournament, where they defeated Western Kentucky in the first round, and California in the second round, before losing to Connecticut in the Sweet Sixteen.

== Rankings ==
Regular-season polls
| Poll | Pre- season | Week 2 | Week 3 | Week 4 | Week 5 | Week 6 | Week 7 | Week 8 | Week 9 | Week 10 | Week 11 | Week 12 | Week 13 | Week 14 | Week 15 | Week 16 | Week 17 | Week 18 | Final |
|---|---|---|---|---|---|---|---|---|---|---|---|---|---|---|---|---|---|---|---|
| AP | 9 | 10 | 6 | 4 | 3 | 3 | 3 | 3 | 3 | 4т | 8 | 14 | 20 | RV | RV | RV | RV | RV | RV |
| Coaches | 12 | 13 | 9 | 4 | 3 | 3 | 3 | 3 | 3 | 5 | 9 | 13 | 16 | 23 | 25 | 24 | RV | RV | RV |

Legend
| | Increase in ranking |
| | Decrease in ranking |
| | No change |
| (RV) | Received votes |
| (NR) | Not ranked |

== 2014–15 media ==
=== Television & radio information ===
Most University of Texas home games were shown on the Longhorn Network, and select games were available through FSN affiliates. Women's basketball games were also carried on the radio via KVET.

== Roster ==
2014–15 Texas Longhorns women's basketball team
Players
Coaches

| Pos. | # | Name | Height | Year | Previous school | Hometown |
|---|---|---|---|---|---|---|
| G | 1 | Empress Davenport | 5 ft 7 in (1.7 m) | Jr | Duncanville | Duncanville, TX |
| G | 2 | Celina Rodrigo | 5 ft 8 in (1.73 m) | RS Jr | Hillgrove | Marietta, GA |
| F | 3 | Nneka Enemkpali | 6 ft 1 in (1.85 m) | Sr | Pflugerville | Pflugerville, TX |
| G | 4 | Krystle Henderson | 5 ft 4 in (1.63 m) | Sr | Dallas Skyline | Dallas, TX |
| G | 11 | Brooke McCarty | 5 ft 4 in (1.63 m) | Fr | Clear Springs | League City, TX |
| G | 20 | Brianna Taylor | 5 ft 9 in (1.75 m) | So | Spring Dekaney | Houston, TX |
| F | 21 | Nekia Jones | 5 ft 11 in (1.8 m) | So | Ozen | Beaumont, TX |
| G | 22 | Tasia Forman | 5 ft 4 in (1.63 m) | Fr | Duncanville | Duncanville, TX |
| G | 24 | Ariel Atkins | 5 ft 11 in (1.8 m) | Fr | Duncanville | Duncanville, TX |
| G | 32 | Brady Sanders | 5 ft 11 in (1.8 m) | Jr | Godley | Joshua, TX |
| C | 34 | Imani Boyette | 6 ft 7 in (2.01 m) | Jr | Windward | Los Angeles, CA |
| F | 35 | Diani Akigbogun | 6 ft 1 in (1.85 m) | Fr | Regis Jesuit | Aurora, CO |
| C | 40 | Kelsey Lang | 6 ft 5 in (1.96 m) | So | The Woodlands | The Woodlands, TX |
| C | 41 | Lilley Vander Zee | 6 ft 4 in (1.93 m) | So | Granbury | Granbury, TX |

Head coach

- Karen Aston (Little Rock)

Assistant coach(es)

- Travis Mays (Texas)
- Jalie Mitchell (North Texas)
- George Washington (Abilene Christian)

Legend

- (C) Team captain
- (S) Suspended
- (I) Ineligible
- (W) Walk-on
- Injured
- Current redshirt

Roster
Last update: June 6, 2024

== Schedule ==
| Date time, TV | Rank^{#} | Opponent^{#} | Result | Record | Site (attendance) city, state |
Exhibition
| 11/09/2014*; 2:00 p.m., LHN | No. 9 | Oklahoma City | W 102–56 | – | Frank Erwin Center (N/A); Austin, TX |
Non-conference regular season
| 11/15/2014*; 2:00 p.m., LHN | No. 9 | UTSA | W 68–48 | 1–0 | Frank Erwin Center (2,466); Austin, TX |
| 11/20/2014*; 8:00 p.m., P12N | No. 10 | at No. 6 Stanford | W 87–81 ^{OT} | 2–0 | Maples Pavilion (3,674); Stanford, CA |
| 11/23/2014*; 3:00 p.m., P12N | No. 10 | at UCLA | W 75–65 | 3–0 | Pauley Pavilion (2,583); Los Angeles, CA |
| 11/26/2014*; 7:00 p.m., LHN | No. 6 | Texas–Pan American | W 72–45 | 4–0 | Frank Erwin Center (2,606); Austin, TX |
| 11/30/2014*; 5:30 p.m., FS1 | No. 6 | No. 4 Tennessee | W 72–57 | 5–0 | Frank Erwin Center (4,198); Austin, TX |
| 12/03/2014*; 7:00 p.m., LHN | No. 4 | New Mexico | W 86–37 | 6–0 | Frank Erwin Center (2,350); Austin, TX |
| 12/08/2014*; 11:00 a.m., LHN | No. 3 | Southern | W 80–42 | 7–0 | Frank Erwin Center (7,042); Austin, TX |
| 12/14/2014*; 2:00 p.m., LHN | No. 3 | Northwestern State | W 74–34 | 8–0 | Frank Erwin Center (2,302); Austin, TX |
| 12/17/2014*; 7:00 p.m., LHN | No. 3 | McNeese State | W 76–59 | 9–0 | Frank Erwin Center (2,408); Austin, TX |
| 12/21/2014*; 12:30 p.m., SECN | No. 3 | vs. No. 4 Texas A&M; Big 12/SEC Women's Challenge | W 67–65 | 10–0 | Verizon Arena (2,544); Little Rock, AR |
| 12/30/2014*; 7:00 p.m., LHN | No. 3 | Rice | W 77–54 | 11–0 | Frank Erwin Center (3,009); Austin, TX |
Big 12 regular season
| 01/03/2015; 7:00 p.m., LHN | No. 3 | Kansas | W 60–46 | 12–0 (1–0) | Frank Erwin Center (3,385); Austin, TX |
| 01/07/2015; 7:00 p.m., LHN | No. 3 | West Virginia | W 61–55 | 13–0 (2–0) | Frank Erwin Center (2,614); Austin, TX |
| 01/10/2015; 11:00 a.m., FSN | No. 3 | at Iowa State | L 57–59 | 13–1 (2–1) | Hilton Coliseum (7,928); Ames, IA |
| 01/14/2015; 7:00 p.m., SSTV | No. 4 | at Oklahoma | L 59–70 | 13–2 (2–2) | Lloyd Noble Center (5,610); Norman, OK |
| 01/17/2015; 12:00 p.m., LHN | No. 4 | Texas Tech | W 55–44 | 14–2 (3–2) | Frank Erwin Center (3,638); Austin, TX |
| 01/19/2015; 5:30 p.m., FS1 | No. 8 | at No. 3 Baylor | L 58–75 | 14–3 (3–3) | Ferrell Center (8,894); Waco, TX |
| 01/25/2015; 3:30 p.m., FS1 | No. 8 | Iowa State | L 57–58 | 14–4 (3–4) | Frank Erwin Center (3,234); Austin, TX |
| 01/29/2015; 6:00 p.m., FS1 | No. 14 | No. 24 Oklahoma | W 84–81 ^{2OT} | 15–4 (4–4) | Frank Erwin Center (2,813); Austin, TX |
| 02/01/2015; 12:00 p.m., FSSW+ | No. 14 | at TCU | L 59–64 | 15–5 (4–5) | Student Recreation Center (1,655); Fort Worth, TX |
| 02/04/2015; 6:00 p.m. | No. 20 | at Kansas State | L 57–66 | 15–6 (4–6) | Bramlage Coliseum (3,845); Manhattan, KS |
| 02/08/2015; 1:00 p.m., ESPN2 | No. 20 | No. 3 Baylor | L 68–70 | 15–7 (4–7) | Frank Erwin Center (6,602); Austin, TX |
| 02/11/2015; 7:00 p.m. | | at Oklahoma State | L 60–66 | 15–8 (4–8) | Gallagher-Iba Arena (2,475); Stillwater, OK |
| 02/14/2015; 7:00 p.m., ESPN3 | | at Kansas | W 74–63 | 16–8 (5–8) | Allen Fieldhouse (3,201); Lawrence, KS |
| 02/18/2015; 7:00 p.m., LHN | | Kansas State | W 76–58 | 17–8 (6–8) | Frank Erwin Center (2,796); Austin, TX |
| 02/21/2015; 3:30 p.m., FSSW | | at Texas Tech | W 62–59 | 18–8 (7–8) | United Supermarkets Arena (4,834); Lubbock, TX |
| 02/25/2015; 7:00 p.m., LHN | | Oklahoma State | W 59–42 | 19–8 (8–8) | Frank Erwin Center (2,957); Austin, TX |
| 03/01/2015; 12:00 p.m., ESPN2 | | at West Virginia | L 69–76 | 19–9 (8–9) | WVU Coliseum (4,303); Morgantown, WV |
| 03/03/2015; 7:00 p.m., LHN | | TCU | W 79–45 | 20–9 (9–9) | Frank Erwin Center (3,125); Austin, TX |
2015 Big 12 women's basketball tournament
| 03/07/2015; 8:30 p.m., FSN | | vs. TCU; Quarterfinals | W 67–61 | 21–9 | American Airlines Center (4,224); Dallas, TX |
| 03/08/2015; 4:00 p.m., FS1 | | vs. Oklahoma; Semifinals | W 59–46 | 22–9 | American Airlines Center (4,580); Dallas, TX |
| 03/09/2015; 8:00 p.m., FS1 | | vs. No. 5 Baylor; Championship game | L 64–75 | 22–10 | American Airlines Center (4,804); Dallas, TX |
NCAA women's tournament
| 03/20/2015*; 4:20 p.m., ESPN2 | | vs. WKU; First round | W 66–64 | 23–10 | Haas Pavilion (N/A); Berkeley, CA |
| 03/22/2015*; 8:00 p.m., ESPN2 | | at California; Second round | W 73–70 | 24–10 | Haas Pavilion (2,852); Berkeley, CA |
| 03/28/2015*; 11:00 a.m., ESPN | | vs. No. 1 Connecticut; Sweet Sixteen | L 54–105 | 24–11 | Times Union Center (N/A); Albany, NY |
*Non-conference game. ^{#}Rankings from AP Poll. (#) Tournament seedings in parentheses. All times are in Central.

== See also ==
- Texas Longhorns women's basketball
- 2014–15 Texas Longhorns men's basketball team
