= 2014–15 West Virginia Mountaineers women's basketball team =

2014–15 West Virginia Mountaineers women's basketball

WNIT, Runner Up
- Conference: Big 12 Conference
- Record: 23–15 (7–11 Big 12)
- Head coach: Mike Carey (14th season)
- Assistant coaches: Lester Rowe (4th season); Sharrona Reaves (2nd season); Chester Nichols (6th season)
- Home arena: WVU Coliseum

2014–15 Big 12 Conference women's basketball standings
	Conf.				Overall
Team	W		L	PCT	W		L	PCT
No. 5 Baylor †	16	–	2	.889	33	–	4	.892
Oklahoma	13	–	5	.722	21	–	12	.636
TCU	9	–	9	.500	18	–	14	.563
Oklahoma State	9	–	9	.500	20	–	12	.625
Iowa State	9	–	9	.500	18	–	13	.581
Texas	9	–	9	.500	24	–	11	.686
West Virginia	7	–	11	.389	23	–	15	.605
Kansas State	7	–	11	.389	19	–	14	.576
Kansas	6	–	12	.333	15	–	17	.469
Texas Tech	5	–	13	.278	15	–	16	.484
† 2015 Big 12 Tournament winner Rankings from AP poll

The 2014–15 West Virginia Mountaineers women's basketball team represented West Virginia University during the 2014–15 NCAA Division I women's basketball season. The Mountaineers were coached by fourteenth year head coach Mike Carey and played their home games at WVU Coliseum. They finished the season 23–15, 7–11 in Big 12 play to finish in a tie for seventh place. They advanced in the quarterfinals of the Big 12 women's basketball tournament where they lost to Oklahoma. They were invited to the Women's National Invitation Tournament, where they advanced to the championship game where they lost to UCLA.

== Roster ==
2014–15 West Virginia Mountaineers women's basketball team
Players
Coaches

Pos.	#	Name	Height	Year	Previous school	Hometown
G	0	Dominique Simpson	5 ft 8 in (1.73 m)	Fr	Jones	Orlando, FL
F	2	Abigail Asoro	5 ft 10 in (1.78 m)	Jr	Iowa Western CC	Stockholm, Sweden
G	3	Tyara Warren	5 ft 9 in (1.75 m)	Fr	Plano West	Plano, TX
C	4	Kayla Montgomery	6 ft 4 in (1.93 m)	Jr	Gulf Coast CC	Powder Springs, GA
F	5	Averee Fields	6 ft 1 in (1.85 m)	Sr	Calloway County	Murray, KY
F	11	Teana Muldrow	6 ft 1 in (1.85 m)	RS Fr	East Orange	East Orange, NJ
C	15	Lanay Montgomery	6 ft 5 in (1.96 m)	RS So	Academy of the Holy Cross	Pittsburgh, PA
G/F	20	Bre McDonald	6 ft 0 in (1.83 m)	So	Georgia Tech	Lithonia, GA
G	21	Jessica Morton	5 ft 10 in (1.78 m)	Jr	Gulf Coast CC	Augusta, GA
G	22	Linda Stepney	5 ft 7 in (1.7 m)	Sr	Lake Taylor	Norfolk, VA
G	23	Bria Holmes	6 ft 1 in (1.85 m)	Jr	James Hillhouse	New Haven, CT
F	32	Crystal Leary	6 ft 2 in (1.88 m)	Sr	Lake Taylor	Norfolk, VA

Head coach

- Mike Carey (Salem)

Assistant coach(es)

- Chester Nichols (Greenville)
- Lester Rowe (West Virginia)
- Sharrona Reaves (Alabama)

Legend

- (C) Team captain
- (S) Suspended
- (I) Ineligible
- (W) Walk-on
- Injured
- Current redshirt

Roster
Last update: 2014-10-01

== Schedule ==
Date time, TV	Rank^{#}	Opponent^{#}	Result	Record	Site (attendance) city, state
Exhibition
10/31/2014*; 7:00 pm	No. 17	Wheeling Jesuit	W 87–49	–	WVU Coliseum (2,062); Morgantown, WV
Non-Conference Games
11/15/2014*; 7:00 pm	No. 17	Eastern Kentucky; Preseason WNIT First Round	W 67–42	1–0	WVU Coliseum (1,707); Morgantown, WV
11/17/2014*; 7:00 pm	No. 17	Seton Hall; Preseason WNIT Second Round	W 89–87	2–0	WVU Coliseum (1,078); Morgantown, WV
11/20/2014*; 8:00 pm	No. 17	at Mississippi State; Preseason WNIT Semifinals	L 61–74	2–1	Humphrey Coliseum (2,502); Starkville, MS
11/26/2014*; 7:00 pm	No. 22	Evansville	W 83–39	3–1	WVU Coliseum (1,202); Morgantown, WV
11/29/2014*; 2:00 pm	No. 22	Fairfield	W 67–53	4–1	WVU Coliseum (845); Morgantown, WV
12/03/2014*; 7:00 pm	No. 24	at Fairleigh Dickinson	W 80–52	5–1	Rothman Center (397); Teaneck, NJ
12/06/2014*; 4:00 pm	No. 24	Coppin State	W 83–43	6–1	WVU Coliseum (2,042); Morgantown, WV
12/10/2014*; 7:00 pm, RTPT	No. 23	Duquesne	W 79–60	7–1	WVU Coliseum (1,322); Morgantown, WV
12/13/2014*; 4:00 pm	No. 23	IPFW	W 82–48	8–1	WVU Coliseum (1,493); Morgantown, WV
12/20/2014*; 4:00 pm	No. 22	vs. Marshall; Chesapeake Energy Capital Classic	W 69–56	9–1	Charleston Civic Center (2,421); Charleston, WV
12/22/2014*; 2:00 pm	No. 21	at Ohio State	L 54–96	9–2	Value City Arena (5,048); Columbus, OH
12/29/2014*; 7:00 pm		St. Francis (PA)	W 101–46	10–2	WVU Coliseum (1,587); Morgantown, WV
Conference Games
01/04/2015; 4:30 pm, FS1		at Oklahoma	L 60–71	10–3 (0–1)	Lloyd Noble Center (5,400); Norman, OK
01/07/2015; 8:00 pm, LHN		at No. 3 Texas	L 55–61	10–4 (0–2)	Frank Erwin Center (2,614); Austin, TX
01/10/2015; 3:00 pm, RTPT		No. 5 Baylor	L 62–66	10–5 (0–3)	WVU Coliseum (3,712); Morgantown, WV
01/14/2015; 7:00 pm, RTPT		Texas Tech	L 45–55	10–6 (0–4)	WVU Coliseum (1,011); Morgantown, WV
01/17/2015; 2:30 pm, FS2		at No. 21 Oklahoma State	W 61–49	11–6 (1–4)	Gallagher-Iba Arena (2,557); Stillwater, OK
01/21/2015; 7:00 pm		Kansas State	W 63–51	12–6 (2–4)	WVU Coliseum (1,797); Morgantown, WV
01/24/2015; 2:00 pm, FSN		at Kansas	L 59–65	12–7 (2–5)	Allen Fieldhouse (2,802); Lawrence, KS
01/28/2015; 8:00 pm		at Texas Tech	L 57–73	12–8 (2–6)	United Supermarkets Arena (3,343); Lubbock, TX
02/01/2015; 2:00 pm		No. 24 Oklahoma	W 78–69	13–8 (3–6)	WVU Coliseum (4,069); Morgantown, WV
02/04/2015; 7:00 pm		TCU	W 76–71	14–8 (4–6)	WVU Coliseum (1,052); Morgantown, WV
02/07/2015; 7:00 pm		at Iowa State	L 43–61	14–9 (4–7)	Hilton Coliseum (11,384); Ames, IA
02/10/2015; 7:00 pm, RTPT		Kansas	W 59–56	15–9 (5–7)	WVU Coliseum (1,563); Morgantown, WV
02/15/2015; 5:00 pm, ESPN2		at No. 3 Baylor	L 51–79	15–10 (5–8)	Ferrell Center (6,762); Waco, TX
02/15/2015; 7:00 pm		Oklahoma State	L 46–52	15–11 (5–9)	WVU Coliseum (1,407); Morgantown, WV
02/21/2015; 12:00 pm, FSN		Iowa State	W 54–52	16–11 (6–9)	WVU Coliseum (2,076); Morgantown, WV
02/24/2015; 8:00 pm, FSSW+		at TCU	L 63–73	16–12 (6–10)	Student Recreation Center (1,351); Ft. Worth, TX
03/01/2015; 1:00 pm, ESPN2		Texas	W 76–69	17–12 (7–10)	WVU Coliseum (4,303); Morgantown, WV
03/03/2015; 8:00 pm, FSKC		at Kansas State	L 55–59	17–13 (7–11)	Bramlage Coliseum (4,043); Manhattan, KS
2015 Big 12 women's basketball tournament
03/06/2015; 9:30 pm, FCS		vs. Texas Tech; First Round	W 59–40	18–13	American Airlines Center (3,363); Dallas, TX
03/06/2015; 7:00 pm, FSN		vs. Oklahoma; Quarterfinals	L 55–67	18–14	American Airlines Center (N/A); Dallas, TX
2015 WNIT
03/19/2015*; 7:00 pm		Buffalo; First Round	W 84–61	19–14	WVU Coliseum (1,755); Morgantown, WV
03/24/2015*; 7:00 pm		Hampton; Second Round	W 57–39	20–14	WVU Coliseum (1,815); Morgantown, WV
03/26/2015*; 7:00 pm		Duquesne; Third Round	W 60–39	21–14	WVU Coliseum (1,471); Morgantown, WV
03/29/2015*; 2:00 pm		Villanova; Quarterfinals	W 75–70 ^{OT}	22–14	WVU Coliseum (2,509); Morgantown, WV
04/01/2015*; 7:00 pm		Temple; Semifinals	W 66–58 ^{OT}	23–14	WVU Coliseum (3,025); Morgantown, WV
04/04/2015*; 3:00 pm, CBSSN		UCLA; Championship Game	L 60–62	23–15	Charleston Civic Center (8,403); Charleston, WV
*Non-conference game. ^{#}Rankings from AP Poll. (#) Tournament seedings in parentheses. All times are in Eastern Time.

== Rankings ==
Regular season polls
Poll	Pre- season	Week 2	Week 3	Week 4	Week 5	Week 6	Week 7	Week 8	Week 9	Week 10	Week 11	Week 12	Week 13	Week 14	Week 15	Week 16	Week 17	Week 18	Final
AP	17	17	22т	24	23	22	21	RV	RV	NR	NR	NR	NR	NR	NR	NR	NR	NR	NR
Coaches	17	16	21	21	20	18	21	21	25	RV	RV	NR	NR	NR	NR	NR	NR	NR	NR

Legend
	Increase in ranking
	Decrease in ranking
	No change
(RV)	Received votes
(NR)	Not ranked

== See also ==
- 2014–15 West Virginia Mountaineers men's basketball team
