= 2014–15 Oklahoma Sooners women's basketball team =

Intercollegiate basketball season

2014–15 Oklahoma Sooners women's basketball

NCAA Women's tournament, second round
- Conference: Big 12
- Record: 21–12 (13–5 Big 12)
- Head coach: Sherri Coale (19th season)
- Assistant coaches: Jan Ross (19th season); Pam DeCosta (6th season); Chad Thrailkill (13th season)
- Home arena: Lloyd Noble Center

2014–15 Big 12 Conference women's basketball standings
	Conf.				Overall
Team	W		L	PCT	W		L	PCT
No. 5 Baylor †	16	–	2	.889	33	–	4	.892
Oklahoma	13	–	5	.722	21	–	12	.636
TCU	9	–	9	.500	18	–	14	.563
Oklahoma State	9	–	9	.500	20	–	12	.625
Iowa State	9	–	9	.500	18	–	13	.581
Texas	9	–	9	.500	24	–	11	.686
West Virginia	7	–	11	.389	23	–	15	.605
Kansas State	7	–	11	.389	19	–	14	.576
Kansas	6	–	12	.333	15	–	17	.469
Texas Tech	5	–	13	.278	15	–	16	.484
† 2015 Big 12 Tournament winner Rankings from AP poll

The 2014–15 Oklahoma Sooners women's basketball team represented the University of Oklahoma in the 2014–15 NCAA Division I women's basketball season. The Sooners were led by Sherri Coale in her nineteenth season. The team played its home games at the Lloyd Noble Center in Norman, Oklahoma as a member of the Big 12 Conference. They finished the season 21–12, 13–5 in Big 12 play to finish in second place. They advanced to the semifinals of the Big 12 women's tournament, where they lost to Texas. They received an at-large bid to the NCAA women's tournament, where they defeated Quinnipiac in the first round before losing to Stanford in the second round.

== Roster ==
2014–15 Oklahoma Sooners women's basketball team
Players
Coaches

Pos.	#	Name	Height	Year	Previous school	Hometown
C	0	Vionise Pierre-Louise	6 ft 4 in (1.93 m)	Fr	Grandview Prep	Lake Worth, FL
G	1	Nicole Kornet	6 ft 1 in (1.85 m)	Jr	Liberty Christian	Lantana, TX
G	2	T'ona Edwards	5 ft 5 in (1.65 m)	So	Northeast Academy	Spencer, OK
G	10	Peyton Little	5 ft 11 in (1.8 m)	RS So	Wylie	Abilene, TX
G	11	Derica Wyatt	5 ft 10 in (1.78 m)	So	Franklin Road Academy	Brentwood, TN
G	12	Gileysa Penzo	5 ft 9 in (1.75 m)	Fr	Montverde Academy	Guaynabo, Puerto Rico
G	13	Whitney Ritchie	5 ft 8 in (1.73 m)	Sr	Bishop McGuinness	Oklahoma City, OK
G	21	Gabbi Ortiz	5 ft 9 in (1.75 m)	Fr	The Prairie School	Racine, WI
F	22	Shaya Kellogg	6 ft 2 in (1.88 m)	So	Ames	Ames, IA
G	23	Maddie Manning	6 ft 2 in (1.88 m)	RS So	Ankeny	Ankeny, IA
G	24	Sharane Campbell-Olds	5 ft 10 in (1.78 m)	Sr	Star Spencer	Spencer, OK
G	25	Gioya Carter	5 ft 9 in (1.75 m)	So	Carl Albert	Midwest City, OK
C	30	McKeena Treece	6 ft 4 in (1.93 m)	Fr	Incarnate Word Academy	St. Peters, MO
G	32	LaNesia Williams	5 ft 7 in (1.7 m)	Fr	Northeast Academy	Oklahoma City, OK
F	42	Kaylon Williams	6 ft 3 in (1.91 m)	RS Jr	Midwest City	Midwest City, OK

Head coach

- Sherri Coale (Oklahoma Christian)

Assistant coach(es)

- Jan Ross (Oklahoma Christian)
- Pam DeCosta (Metro State)
- Chad Thrailkill (Southern Nazarene)

Legend

- (C) Team captain
- (S) Suspended
- (I) Ineligible
- (W) Walk-on
- Injured
- Current redshirt

Roster
Last update: 2014-10-09

== Schedule ==
Date time, TV	Rank^{#}	Opponent^{#}	Result	Record	Site (attendance) city, state
Exhibition
11/05/2014*; 7:00 pm, SSTV		Southeastern Oklahoma State	W 106–59	–	Lloyd Noble Center (2,015); Norman, OK
Non-conference regular season
11/14/2014*; 7:00 pm, SSTV		Washington	W 90–80	1–0	Lloyd Noble Center (5,280); Norman, OK
11/18/2014*; 7:00 pm, SSTV		Lamar	W 100–73	2–0	Lloyd Noble Center (4,201); Norman, OK
11/21/2014*; 7:00 pm, SSTV		Bradley	W 104–55	3–0	Lloyd Noble Center (5,285); Norman, OK
11/27/2014*; 7:15 pm		vs. South Florida; Paradise Jam tournament	L 68–83	3–1	Sports and Fitness Center (1,978); Saint Thomas, USVI
11/28/2014*; 5:00 pm		vs. No. 9 Kentucky; Paradise Jam Tournament	L 88–92 ^{OT}	3–2	Sports and Fitness Center (N/A); Saint Thomas, USVI
11/29/2014*; 5:00 pm		vs. Illinois; Paradise Jam Tournament	W 78–76 ^{OT}	4–2	Sports and Fitness Center (N/A); Saint Thomas, USVI
12/07/2014*; 11:00 am, FSN		at North Texas	W 68–39	5–2	The Super Pit (1,937); Denton, TX
12/14/2014*; 4:00 pm		at Arkansas–Little Rock	L 62–66	5–3	Jack Stephens Center (1,330); Little Rock, AR
12/17/2014*; 5:30 pm, ESPN3		at No. 13 Duke	L 72–92	5–4	Cameron Indoor Stadium (4,006); Durham, NC
12/21/2014*; 3:00 pm, SECN		vs. Arkansas; SEC/Big 12 Women's Challenge	L 64–71	5–5	Verizon Arena (3,689); Little Rock, AR
12/30/2014*; 7:00 pm, SSTV		Yale	W 71–54	6–5	Lloyd Noble Center (4,990); Norman, OK
Big 12 regular season
01/04/2015; 3:30 pm, FS1		West Virginia	W 71–60	7–5 (1–0)	Lloyd Noble Center (5,400); Norman, OK
01/07/2015; 7:00 pm, ESPN3		at Kansas	W 69–57	8–5 (2–0)	Allen Fieldhouse (1,718); Lawrence, KS
01/10/2015; 2:00 pm		at Texas Tech	W 75–58	9–5 (3–0)	United Spirit Arena (4,629); Lubbock, TX
01/14/2015; 7:00 pm, SSTV		No. 4 Texas	W 70–59	10–5 (4–0)	Lloyd Noble Center (5,610); Norman, OK
01/17/2015; 1:00 pm		at TCU	W 97–81	11–5 (5–0)	Student Recreation Center (1,350); Ft. Worth, TX
01/19/2015; 3:30 pm, FS1		Oklahoma State; Bedlam Series	W 73–54	12–5 (6–0)	Lloyd Noble Center (7,111); Norman, OK
01/24/2015; 3:30 pm, SSTV		Texas Tech	W 70–64	13–5 (7–0)	Lloyd Noble Center (5,676); Norman, OK
01/29/2015; 6:00 pm, FS1	No. 24	at No. 14 Texas	L 81–84 ^{2OT}	13–6 (7–1)	Frank Erwin Center (2,813); Austin, TX
02/01/2015; 1:00 pm	No. 24	at West Virginia	L 69–78	13–7 (7–2)	WVU Coliseum (4,069); Morgantown, WV
02/04/2015; 10:30 am, SSTV		Iowa State	W 75–66	14–7 (8–2)	Lloyd Noble Center (6,042); Norman, OK
02/07/2015; 2:00 pm, SSTV		Kansas State	W 66–58	15–7 (9–2)	Lloyd Noble Center (5,353); Norman, OK
02/11/2015; 7:00 pm, FSSW+		at No. 3 Baylor	L 66–89	15–8 (9–3)	Ferrell Center (7,683); Waco, TX
02/14/2015; 3:00 pm, SSTV		TCU	W 77–54	16–8 (10–3)	Lloyd Noble Center (6,475); Norman, OK
02/17/2015; 8:00 pm, FS1		at Iowa State	L 76–84 ^{OT}	16–9 (10–4)	Hilton Coliseum (9,964); Ames, IA
02/21/2015; 7:00 pm, TWCSC		at Kansas State	W 73–64	17–9 (11–4)	Bramlage Coliseum (5,418); Manhattan, KS
02/25/2015; 7:00 pm, SSTV		No. 3 Baylor	W 68–64	18–9 (12–4)	Lloyd Noble Center (5,479); Norman, OK
02/28/2015; 6:00 pm, SSTV		Kansas	L 58–65	18–10 (12–5)	Lloyd Noble Center (3,000); Norman, OK
03/02/2015; 7:00 pm, FSOK		at Oklahoma State; Bedlam Series	W 66–56	19–10 (13–5)	Gallagher-Iba Arena (4,364); Stillwater, OK
2015 Big 12 women's basketball tournament
03/07/2015; 6:00 pm, FSN		vs. West Virginia; Quarterfinals	W 67–55	20–10	American Airlines Center (N/A); Dallas, TX
03/08/2015; 4:00 pm, FS1		vs. Texas; Semifinals	L 46–59	20–11	American Airlines Center (4,580); Dallas, TX
NCAA Women's tournament
03/21/2015*; 3:00 pm, ESPN2		vs. Quinnipiac; First Round	W 111–84	21–11	Maples Pavilion (N/A); Stanford, CA
03/23/2015*; 5:30 pm, ESPN2		at Stanford; Second Round	L 76–86	21–12	Maples Pavilion (2,532); Stanford, CA
*Non-conference game. ^{#}Rankings from AP Poll. (#) Tournament seedings in parentheses. All times are in Central Time.

x- Sooner Sports Television (SSTV) is aired locally on Fox Sports. However the contract allows games to air on various affiliates. Those affiliates are FSSW, FSSW+, FSOK, FSOK+, and FCS Atlantic, Central, and Pacific.

== Rankings ==
Ranking movement Legend: ██ Improvement in ranking. ██ Decrease in ranking. ██NR = Not ranked. RV = Receiving votes.
Poll	Pre- season	Week 2	Week 3	Week 4	Week 5	Week 6	Week 7	Week 8	Week 9	Week 10	Week 11	Week 12	Week 13	Week 14	Week 15	Week 16	Week 17	Week 18	Final
AP	RV	RV	RV	NR	RV	NR	NR	NR	NR	NR	RV	24	RV	RV	RV	RV	RV	NR	NR
Coaches	RV	RV	RV	NR	RV	RV	NR	NR	NR	NR	RV	RV	RV	RV	RV	RV	RV	NR	NR

== See also ==
- 2014–15 Oklahoma Sooners men's basketball team
