= Jim Littell =

American basketball coach

Biographical details
- Born: September 28, 1955 (age 71); Wichita, Kansas, U.S.
- Education: Southwestern College (Kansas)

Coaching career (HC unless noted)
- 1978–1983: Oxford HS
- 1983–1988: Friends
- 1990–1991: Garden Plain High School (Girls Head)
- 1991–2005: Seward County CC
- 2005–2011: Oklahoma State (assoc. HC)
- 2011–2022: Oklahoma State
- 2022–2023: Wichita State (assistant)

Head coaching record
- Overall: 176–111 (.613)
- Tournaments: 5–6 (.455) (NCAA Division I); 0–0 (–) (Big 12)

James Alan Littell (born September 28, 1955) is an American former head coach of the Oklahoma State University women's basketball team. He was most recently an assistant coach for Wichita State women’s basketball team.

Littell spent 14 seasons as the head coach at Seward County Community College, where he had a record of 418–61 (.873) and recorded nine conference titles. In 2005 he became an assistant coach at Oklahoma State under new coach Kurt Budke.

After Budke's death in a plane crash on November 17, 2011, Littell was promoted to head coach, and led the team to the 2012 Women's National Invitation Tournament championship.

On March 7, 2022, it was announced that Littell and Oklahoma State agreed to part ways after 11 years as head coach.

== Head coaching record ==
Record table
Season	Team	Overall	Conference	Standing	Postseason
Oklahoma State Cowgirls (Big 12 Conference) (2011–present)
2011–12	Oklahoma State	21–12	8–10	T–6th	WNIT Champions
2012–13	Oklahoma State	22–11	9–9	T–5th	NCAA second round
2013–14	Oklahoma State	25–9	11–7	T–3rd	NCAA Sweet Sixteen
2014–15	Oklahoma State	20–12	9–9	T–3rd	NCAA first round
2015–16	Oklahoma State	21–10	11–7	T–4th	NCAA first round
2016–17	Oklahoma State	17–15	6–12	7th	WNIT First Round
2017–18	Oklahoma State	21–11	11–7	T-3rd	NCAA second round
2018–19	Oklahoma State	14–16	5–13	7th	
2019–20	Oklahoma State	15–15	6–12	8th	
2020–21	Oklahoma State	19–9	13–5	T-2nd	NCAA second round
2021–22	Oklahoma State	9–20	3–15	9th	
Oklahoma State:		204–140 (.593)	92–106 (.465)		
Total:		204–140 (.593)			
National champion Postseason invitational champion Conference regular season champion Conference regular season and conference tournament champion Division regular season champion Division regular season and conference tournament champion Conference tournament champion
