= 2015 Big 12 Conference women's basketball tournament =

- Classification: Division I
- Season: 2014–15
- Teams: 10
- Site: American Airlines Center; Dallas, Texas
- Champions: Baylor (7th title)
- Winning coach: Kim Mulkey (7th title)
- MVP: Nina Davis (Baylor)
- Attendance: 21,155 (overall); 4,804 (championship)
- Television: FCS-Central, FSN, FS1

2014–15 Big 12 Conference women's basketball standings
	Conf.				Overall
Team	W		L	PCT	W		L	PCT
No. 5 Baylor †	16	–	2	.889	33	–	4	.892
Oklahoma	13	–	5	.722	21	–	12	.636
TCU	9	–	9	.500	18	–	14	.563
Oklahoma State	9	–	9	.500	20	–	12	.625
Iowa State	9	–	9	.500	18	–	13	.581
Texas	9	–	9	.500	24	–	11	.686
West Virginia	7	–	11	.389	23	–	15	.605
Kansas State	7	–	11	.389	19	–	14	.576
Kansas	6	–	12	.333	15	–	17	.469
Texas Tech	5	–	13	.278	15	–	16	.484
† 2015 Big 12 Tournament winner Rankings from AP poll

The 2015 Big 12 Conference women's basketball tournament was the postseason women's basketball tournament for the Big 12 Conference, held from March 6 to 9 in Dallas, Texas, at the American Airlines Center.

== Seeds ==
2015 Big 12 Conference women's basketball tournament seeds
Seed	School	Conf.	Over.	Tiebreaker
1	‡ - Baylor	16-2	27-3	
2	# - Oklahoma	13-5	19-10	
3	# - TCU	9-9	17-12	2-0 OSU, 1-1 ISU, 1-1 Texas
4	# - Oklahoma State	9-9	19-10	1-1 ISU, 1-1 Texas, 0-2 TCU
5	# - Iowa State	9-9	18-11	1-1 TCU, OSU 0-2, 2-0 Texas
6	Texas	9-9	20-9	1-1 TCU, 1-1 OSU, 0-2 ISU
7	West Virginia	7-11	17-13	1-1 ISU, 1-1 KSU, 1-1 OSU, 1-1 TCU, 1-1 Texas
8	Kansas State	7-11	17-12	1-1 OSU, 1-1 TCU, 1-1 Texas, 1-1 WVU, 0-2 ISU
9	Kansas	6-12	15-16	
10	Texas Tech	5-13	15-15	
‡ – Big 12 Conference regular season champions, and tournament No. 1 seed. # – Received a single-bye in the conference tournament. Overall records include all games played in the Big 12 Conference tournament.

== Schedule ==
Session	Game	Time	Matchup	Television	Attendance
First round – Friday, March 6
1	1	6:00 pm	#8 Kansas State 57 vs #9 Kansas 49	FCS-Central	3,633
1	2	8:32 pm	#7 West Virginia 59 vs #10 Texas Tech 40	FCS-Central	3,633
Quarterfinals – Saturday, March 7
2	3	11:00 am	#4 Oklahoma State 67 vs #5 Iowa State 58	FSN	3,914
2	4	1:30 pm	#1 Baylor 82 vs #8 Kansas State 70	FSN	3,914
3	5	6:00 pm	#2 Oklahoma 67 vs #7 West Virginia 55	FSN	4,224
3	6	8:30 pm	#6 Texas 67 vs #3 TCU 61	FSN	4,224
Semifinals – Sunday, March 8
4	7	1:30 pm	#1 Baylor 69 vs #4 Oklahoma State 52	FS1	4,580
4	8	4:00 pm	#6 Texas 59 vs #2 Oklahoma 46	FS1	4,580
Final – Monday, March 9
5	9	8:00 pm	#1 Baylor 75 vs #6 Texas 64	FS1	4,804
Game times in CT. #-Rankings denote tournament seed

== Bracket ==
First round Friday, March 6 FCS Central
8	Kansas State	57
9	Kansas	49
7	West Virginia	59
10	Texas Tech	40

Quarterfinals; Saturday, March 7 FSN
1	Baylor	82
8	Kansas State	70
4	Oklahoma State	67
5	Iowa State	58
2	Oklahoma	67
7	West Virginia	55
3	TCU	61
6	Texas	67

Semifinals; Sunday, March 8 FS1
1	Baylor	69
4	Oklahoma State	52
2	Oklahoma	46
6	Texas	59

Championship game Monday, March 9 FS1
1	Baylor	75
6	Texas	64

== All-Tournament team ==
Most Outstanding Player – Nina Davis, Baylor

Player	Team
Nina Davis	Baylor
Niya Johnson	Baylor
Alexis Prince	Baylor
Imani McGee-Stafford	Texas
Roshunda Johnson	Oklahoma State

== See also ==
- 2015 Big 12 Conference men's basketball tournament
- 2015 NCAA Women's Division I Basketball Tournament
- 2014–15 NCAA Division I women's basketball rankings
