= 2014–15 NCAA Division I women's basketball rankings =

- Season: 2014–15
- NCAA Tournament: 2015
- Preseason No. 1: Connecticut
- NCAA Tournament Champions: Connecticut
NCAA Division I women's basketball rankings


Two human polls make up the 2014–15 NCAA Division I women's basketball rankings, the AP Poll and the Coaches Poll, in addition to various publications' preseason polls.

== Legend ==
	Increase in ranking
	Decrease in ranking
	Not ranked previous week
Italics	Number of first place votes
(#-#)	Win–loss record
т	Tied with team above or below also with this symbol

== AP Poll ==
This poll is compiled by sportswriters across the nation. In Division I men's and women's college basketball, the AP Poll is largely just a tool to compare schools throughout the season and spark debate, as it has no bearing on postseason play.

	Preseason Nov. 10	Week 2 Nov. 17	Week 3 Nov. 24	Week 4 Dec. 1	Week 5 Dec. 8	Week 6 Dec. 15	Week 7 Dec. 22	Week 8 Dec. 29	Week 9 Jan. 5	Week 10 Jan. 11	Week 11 Jan. 18	Week 12 Jan. 25	Week 13 Feb. 2	Week 14 Feb. 9	Week 15 Feb. 16	Week 16 Feb. 23	Week 17 Mar. 2	Week 18 Mar. 9	Final	
1.	Connecticut (35)	Connecticut (1-0) (35)	South Carolina (3-0) (21)	South Carolina (5-0) (20)	South Carolina (8-0) (23)	South Carolina (9-0) (25)	South Carolina (12-0) (24)	South Carolina (12-0) (24)	South Carolina (14-0) (24)	South Carolina (16-0) (28)	South Carolina (17-0) (27)	South Carolina (18-0) (27)	South Carolina (21-0) (26)	South Carolina (22-0) (26)	Connecticut (24-1) (35)	Connecticut (26-1) (34)	Connecticut (28-1) (35)	Connecticut (31-1) (35)	Connecticut (32-1) (35)	1.
2.	South Carolina	South Carolina (1-0)	Notre Dame (4-0) (12)	Notre Dame (7-0) (13)	Connecticut (6-1) (7)	Connecticut (6-1) (6)	Connecticut (8-1) (6)	Connecticut (9-1) (7)	Connecticut (12-1) (7)	Connecticut 14-1) (7)	Connecticut (16-1) (8)	Connecticut (18-1) (8)	Connecticut (20-1) (8)	Connecticut (22-1) (8)	South Carolina (24-1)	South Carolina (25-1)	Notre Dame (28-2)	Notre Dame (31-2)	Notre Dame (31-2)	2.
3.	Notre Dame	Notre Dame (1-0)	Connecticut (2-1) (1)	Connecticut (5-1) (1)	Texas (6-0) (4)	Texas (8-0) (4)	Texas (10-0) (4)	Texas (10-0) (4)	Texas (12-0) (4)	Baylor (14-1)	Baylor (16-1)	Baylor (18-1)	Baylor (20-1)	Baylor (22-1)	Baylor (24-1)	Baylor (26-1)	South Carolina (27-2)	South Carolina (30-2)	South Carolina (30-2)	3.
4.	Tennessee	Tennessee (1-0)	Tennessee (3-0)	Texas (5-0) (1)	Texas A&M (9-0)	Texas A&M (11-0)	Notre Dame (11-1)	Notre Dame (12-1)	Notre Dame (14-1)	Louisville (15-1) т	Louisville (17-1)	Notre Dame (19-2)	Notre Dame (21-2)	Notre Dame (23-2)	Notre Dame (23-2)	Notre Dame (25-2)	Maryland (27-2)	Maryland (30-2)	Maryland (30-2)	4.
5.	Texas A&M	Texas A&M (3-0)	Stanford (2-1)	Texas A&M (7-0)	Notre Dame (8-1)	Notre Dame (10-1)	Texas A&M (11-1)	Texas A&M (11-1)	Baylor (12-1)	Texas (13-1) т	Tennessee (15-2)	Maryland (17-2)	Maryland (19-2)	Maryland (21-2)	Maryland (22-2)	Maryland (24-2)	Tennessee (25-4)	Baylor (29-3)	Baylor (30-3)	5.
6.	Stanford	Stanford (1-0)	Texas (3-0) (1)	North Carolina (7-0)	North Carolina (8-0)	North Carolina (9-0)	Baylor (10-1)	Baylor (10-1)	Louisville (14-1)	Tennessee (14-2)	Notre Dame (16-2)	Tennessee (17-3)	Tennessee (19-3)	Tennessee (20-3)	Tennessee (22-3)	Tennessee (23-3)	Baylor (26-3)	Tennessee (27-5)	Tennessee (27-5)	6.
7.	Duke	Duke (1-0)	Texas A&M (4-0)	Louisville (7-0)	Stanford (5-2)	Stanford (6-2)	Louisville (11-1)	Louisville (11-1)	Tennessee (11-2)	Notre Dame (15-2)	Maryland (15-2)	Oregon State (18-1)	Oregon State (19-1)	Florida State (22-2)	Oregon State (23-2)	Oregon State (25-2)	Florida St (27-3)	Florida St (29-4)	Florida St (29-4)	7.
8.	Baylor	Baylor (1-0)	Duke (3-0)	Stanford (5-2)	Kentucky (8-1)	Kentucky (10-1)	Tennessee (9-2)	Tennessee (10-2)	North Carolina (14-1)	Maryland (13-2)	Texas (14-2)	Louisville (18-2)	Louisville (19-2)	Oregon State (21-2)	Louisville (22-3)	Louisville (23-3)	Oregon St (26-3)	Louisville (25-6)	Louisville (25-6)	8.
9.	Texas	Maryland (2-0)	Kentucky (4-0)	Duke (5-1)	Baylor (6-1)	Baylor (8-1)	North Carolina (11-1)	North Carolina (11-1)	Texas A&M (14-2)	Oregon State (14-1)	Oregon State (15-1)	Florida State (19-2)	Florida State (20-2)	Louisville (20-3)	Florida State (22-3)	Florida State (25-3)	Arizona State (24-4)	Arizona State (27-5)	Arizona State (27-5)	9.
10.	Maryland	Texas (1-0)	Maryland (4-0)	Cal (6-0)	Louisville (8-1)	Louisville (8-1)	Duke (8-3) т-10	Duke (8-2)	Kentucky (13-2)	Kentucky (14-3)	Texas A&M (16-3)	Kentucky (16-4)	Arizona State (20-2)	Kentucky (18-5)	Duke (18-6)	Arizona State (24-4)	Louisville (24-5)	Oregon St (26-4)	Oregon St (26-4)	10.
11.	Kentucky	North Carolina (2-0)	North Carolina (4-0)	Baylor (4-1)	Tennessee (6-2)	Tennessee (7-2)	Oregon State (10-0) т-10	Kentucky (11-2)	Oregon State (11-1)	Texas A&M (15-3)	Stanford (13-4)	Arizona State (18-2)	Kentucky (17-5)	Duke (18-6)	Kentucky (19-6)	Mississippi State (25-4)	Mississippi State (26-5)	Kentucky (23-9)	Kentucky (23-9)	11.
12.	Louisville	Louisville (2-0)	Louisville (4-0)	Nebraska (6-0)	Nebraska (7-1)	Nebraska (9-1)	Kentucky (10-2) т-12	Nebraska (10-1)	Maryland (11-2)	North Carolina (15-2)	North Carolina (16-3)	Stanford (15-5) т	Stanford (16-5)	Arizona State (21-3)	Arizona State (22-4)	Texas A&M (22-6)	Kentucky (21-8)	Mississippi State (26-6)	Mississippi State (26-6)	12.
13.	North Carolina	Kentucky (1-0)	Baylor (1-1)	Kentucky (6-1)	Duke (5-3)	Duke (5-3)	Nebraska (10-1) т-12	Oregon State (10-1)	Duke (10-4)	Stanford (12-4)	Arizona State (16-1)	Texas A&M (16-4) т	North Carolina (18-4)	Mississippi State (23-3)	Iowa (21-4)	Kentucky (19-7)	Princeton (27-0)	Princeton (29-0)	Princeton (30-0)	13.
14.	Michigan State	Cal (1-0)	Cal (4-0)	Tennessee (4-2)	Maryland (7-2)	Maryland (8-2)	Georgia (11-0)	Maryland (9-2)	Mississippi State (17-0)	Arizona State (15-1)	Kentucky (15-4)	Texas (14-4)	Texas A&M (17-5)	Iowa (19-4)	Mississippi State (24-4)	Princeton (25-0)	Iowa (23-6)	Stanford (24-9)	Stanford (24-9)	14.
15.	Cal	Michigan State (1-0)	Nebraska (4-0)	Maryland (6-1)	Oregon State (7-0)	Georgia (10-0)	Maryland (9-2)	Stanford (8-4)	Stanford (9-4)	Mississippi State (18-1)	Duke (13-5)	Nebraska (15-3)	Duke (15-6)	Texas A&M (18-6)	Texas A&M (19-6)	North Carolina (22-6)	North Carolina (23-7)	North Carolina (24-8)	North Carolina (24-8)	15.
16.	Nebraska	Nebraska (2-0)	Michigan State (2-1)	Michigan State (4-1)	Georgia (10-0)	Oregon State (7-0)	Stanford (6-4)	Rutgers (10-2)	Oklahoma State (10-2)	Duke (11-5)	Nebraska (13-3)	North Carolina (17-4)	Iowa (17-4)	Princeton (21-0)	Princeton (23-0)	Duke (19-8)	Duke (20-9)	Duke (21-10)	Duke (21-10)	16.
17.	West Virginia	West Virginia (1-0)	Iowa (4-0)	Oregon State (5-0)	Rutgers (7-1)	Rutgers (8-2)	Rutgers (9-2)	Mississippi State (14-0)	Iowa (11-2)	Nebraska (12-3)	Florida State (17-2)	Duke (14-6)	Mississippi State (22-3)	North Carolina (19-5)	North Carolina (20-6)	Iowa (21-6)	Chattanooga (26-3)	Chattanooga (29-3)	Chattanooga (29-3)	17.
18.	DePaul	DePaul (2-1)	DePaul (4-1)	Rutgers (6-0)	Cal (7-1)	Michigan State (6-2)	Oklahoma State (9-1)	Oklahoma State (9-1)	Arizona State (12-1)	Georgia (15-2)	Mississippi State (19-2)	Mississippi State (20-2)	Princeton (19-0)	Rutgers (18-5)	Stanford (17-7)	Chattanooga (24-3)	Texas A&M (22-8)	Iowa (24-7)	Iowa (24-7)	18.
19.	Iowa	Iowa (2-0)	Oregon State (3-0)	Georgia (7-0)	Michigan State (5-2)	Oklahoma State (6-1) т	Mississippi State (14-0)	Georgia (12-1)	Nebraska (10-3)	Princeton (17-0)	Princeton (17-0)	Princeton (17-0)	Nebraska (17-4)	Stanford (17-7)	Rutgers (19-6)	Stanford (20-8)	Stanford (21-9)	George Washington (29-3)	George Washington (29-3)	19.
20.	Oregon State	Oregon State (2-0)	Oklahoma State (3-1)	Oklahoma State (5-1)	Oklahoma State (6-1) т	Syracuse (7-1) т	Michigan State (8-3)	Iowa (10-2)	Georgia (13-2)	Florida State (15-2)	Iowa (14-3)	Iowa (15-3)	Texas (15-5)	George Washington (21-2)	Chattanooga (22-3)	Rutgers (20-7)	Florida Gulf Coast (27-2)	Florida Gulf Coast (28-2)	Florida Gulf Coast (30-2)	20.
21.	Oklahoma State	Oklahoma State (2-0)	Rutgers (3-0)	Syracuse (4-1)	Syracuse (6-1) т	Mississippi State (10-0)	West Virginia (9-1)	Syracuse (9-3)	Syracuse (10-4)	Oklahoma State (11-3)	Minnesota (16-2)	Georgia (17-4)	Rutgers (16-5)	Chattanooga (20-3)	Nebraska (18-7)	Florida Gulf Coast (25-2)	George Washington (26-3)	Texas A&M (23-9)	Texas A&M (23-9)	21.
22.	Dayton	Rutgers (1-0)	Georgia (4-0)	Iowa (6-1)	Mississippi State (8-0)	West Virginia (8-1)	Syracuse (8-3)	Arizona State (11-1)	Princeton (15-0)	Iowa (12-3)	Georgia (16-3)	Rutgers (14-5)	Georgia (17-5)	Nebraska (17-6)	Florida Gulf Coast (23-2)	George Washington (24-3)	Syracuse (21-8)	Northwestern (23-8)	Northwestern (23-8)	22.
23.	UCLA	Syracuse (1-0)	Syracuse (3-0)	Mississippi State (6-0)	West Virginia (6-1)	Iowa (8-2)	Iowa (9-2)	Seton Hall (12-1)	Minnesota (14-1)	Minnesota (14-2)	Syracuse (13-5)	Syracuse (15-5)	Chattanooga (19-3)	Syracuse (17-7)	James Madison (22-2)	Syracuse (20-8)	Rutgers (21-8)	Ohio State (23-10)	Ohio State (23-10)	23.
24.	Rutgers	Georgia (2-0) т	West Virginia (2-1)	West Virginia (4-1)	Iowa (7-2)	Cal (7-2)	Green Bay (9-2)	Michigan State (8-4)	Rutgers (10-4)	Rutgers (12-4)	Western Kentucky (16-2)	Oklahoma (13-5)	George Washington (19-2)	Georgia (17-6)	George Washington (22-3)	California (20-7)	Northwestern (22-7)	Seton Hall (27-4)	California (23-9)	24.
25.	Syracuse	Gonzaga (1-0) т; Purdue (1-0) т	Mississippi State (4-0)	Arkansas (6-0) т; DePaul (4-2) т	DePaul (6-2)	DePaul (6-3)	Arizona State (10-1)	DePaul (9-4)	Western Kentucky (12-2)	Syracuse (11-5)	Rutgers (13-5)	Chattanooga (17-3)	Syracuse (15-6)	USF (19-4)	Syracuse (18-8)	Northwestern (21-6)	Seton Hall (26-4)	California (23-9)	South Florida (26-7)	25.
	Preseason Nov. 10	Week 2 Nov. 17	Week 3 Nov. 24	Week 4 Dec. 1	Week 5 Dec. 8	Week 6 Dec. 15	Week 7 Dec. 22	Week 8 Dec. 29	Week 9 Jan. 5	Week 10 Jan. 11	Week 11 Jan. 18	Week 12 Jan. 25	Week 13 Feb. 2	Week 14 Feb. 9	Week 15 Feb. 16	Week 16 Feb. 23	Week 17 Mar. 2	Week 18 Mar. 9	Final	
		Dropped: Dayton (0-2); UCLA (0-2)	Dropped: Gonzaga (3-0); Purdue (2-1)	None	Dropped: Arkansas (6-2)	None	Dropped: Cal (7-3); DePaul (7-4)	Dropped: West Virginia (9-2); Green Bay (9-3)	Dropped: Seton Hall (13-2); Michigan State (8-6); DePaul (10-5)	Dropped: Western Kentucky (14-2)	Dropped: Oklahoma State (12-4)	Dropped: Minnesota (16-4); Western Kentucky (17-3)	Dropped: Oklahoma (13-7)	Dropped: Texas (15-7)	Dropped: Georgia (17-8); USF (20-5)	Dropped: Nebraska (19-8); James Madison (23-3)	Dropped: California (21-8)	Dropped: Syracuse (21-9); Rutgers (22-9)	Dropped: Seton Hall (28-5)	

== USA Today Coaches Poll ==
The Coaches Poll is the second oldest poll still in use after the AP Poll. It is compiled by a rotating group of 32 college Division I head coaches. The Poll operates by Borda count. Each voting member ranks teams from 1 to 25. Each team then receives points for their ranking in reverse order: Number 1 earns 25 points, number 2 earns 24 points, and so forth. The points are then combined and the team with the highest points is then ranked #1; second highest is ranked #2 and so forth. Only the top 25 teams with points are ranked, with teams receiving first place votes noted the quantity next to their name. The maximum points a single team can earn is 800.

	Preseason Nov. 10	Week 2 Nov. 18	Week 3 Nov. 25	Week 4 Dec. 2	Week 5 Dec. 9	Week 6 Dec. 16	Week 7 Dec. 23	Week 8 Dec. 30	Week 9 Jan. 6	Week 10 Jan. 13	Week 11 Jan. 20	Week 12 Jan. 27	Week 13 Feb. 3	Week 14 Feb. 10	Week 15 Feb. 17	Week 16 Feb. 24	Week 17 Mar. 3	Week 18 Mar. 10	Final	
1.	Connecticut (32)	Stanford (2-0) (14)	Notre Dame (5-0) (14)	Notre Dame (7-0) (19)	South Carolina (8-0) (24)	South Carolina (9-0) (23)	South Carolina (12-0) (25)	South Carolina (12-0) (25)	South Carolina (14-0) (26)	South Carolina (16-0) (27)	South Carolina (18-0) (25)	South Carolina (19-0) (25)	South Carolina (21-0) (26)	Connecticut (23-1) (32)	Connecticut (24-1) (31)	Connecticut (27-1) (32)	Connecticut (29-1) (32)	Connecticut (32-1) (32)	Connecticut (32-1) (32)	1.
2.	South Carolina	Notre Dame (1-0) (6)	South Carolina (3-0) (14)	South Carolina (6-0) (10)	Connecticut (6-1) (6)	Connecticut (6-1) (6)	Connecticut (8-1) (6)	Connecticut (10-1) (6)	Connecticut (12-1) (5)	Connecticut (14-1) (5)	Connecticut (16-1) (7)	Connecticut (18-1) (7)	Connecticut (20-1) (6)	South Carolina (22-1)	South Carolina (24-1) (1)	South Carolina (26-1)	Notre Dame (28-2)	Notre Dame (31-2)	Notre Dame (31-2)	2.
3.	Notre Dame	South Carolina (1-0) (8)	Connecticut (2-1) (2)	Connecticut (5-1) (1)	Texas (7-0) (2)	Texas (8-0) (1)	Texas (10-0) (1)	Texas (10-0) (1)	Texas (12-0) (1)	Baylor (14-1)	Baylor (17-1)	Baylor (18-1)	Baylor (20-1)	Baylor (22-1)	Baylor (24-1)	Baylor (26-1)	Maryland (27-2)	Maryland (30-2)	Maryland (30-2)	3.
4.	Tennessee	Connecticut (1-1) (4)	Stanford (3-1)	Texas (5-0) (2)	Notre Dame (8-1)	Notre Dame (10-1) (1)	Notre Dame (11-1)	Notre Dame (12-1)	Notre Dame (14-1)	Louisville (15-1)	Louisville (17-1)	Notre Dame (19-2)	Notre Dame (21-2)	Notre Dame (23-2)	Notre Dame (24-2)	Notre Dame (26-2)	South Carolina (27-2)	South Carolina (30-2)	South Carolina (30-2)	4.
5.	Texas A&M	Tennessee (2-0)	Tennessee (4-0)	Texas A&M (7-0)	Texas A&M (9-0)	Texas A&M (11-0)	Texas A&M (11-1)	Baylor (11-1)	Baylor (12-1)	Texas (13-1)	Notre Dame (17-2)	Maryland (17-2)	Maryland (19-2)	Maryland (21-2)	Maryland (23-2)	Maryland (25-2)	Tennessee (25-4)	Tennessee (27-5)	Tennessee (27-5)	5.
6.	Stanford	Texas A&M (3-0)	Texas A&M (5-0)	North Carolina (7-0)	North Carolina (8-0)	North Carolina (9-0)	Baylor (10-1)	Louisville (12-1)	North Carolina (14-1)	Tennessee (14-2)	Maryland (15-2)	Tennessee (17-3)	Tennessee (19-3)	Tennessee (20-3)	Tennessee (22-3)	Tennessee (23-4)	Florida State (27-3)	Baylor (30-3)	Baylor (30-3)	6.
7.	Duke	Duke (1-0)	Duke (3-0)	Louisville (7-0)	Stanford (5-2)	Stanford (6-2)	Louisville (11-1)	North Carolina (11-1)	Louisville (14-1)	Notre Dame (15-2)	Tennessee (15-3)	Oregon State (18-1)	Oregon State (20-1)	Florida State (22-2)	Louisville (22-3)	Oregon State (25-2)	Baylor (27-3)	Florida St (29-4)	Florida St (29-4)	7.
8.	Maryland	Maryland (2-0)	Maryland (5-0)	Duke (5-1)	Kentucky (8-1)	Kentucky (10-1)	North Carolina (11-1)	Texas A&M (11-2)	Texas A&M (14-2)	Maryland (13-2)	Oregon State (16-1)	Louisville (18-2)	Florida State (21-2)	Louisville (20-3)	Oregon State (23-2)	Florida State (25-3)	Arizona State (26-4)	Louisville (25-6)	Louisville (25-6)	8.
9.	Baylor	Kentucky (2-0)	Texas (3-0) (2)	Stanford (5-2)	Baylor (6-1)	Baylor (8-1)	Maryland (9-2)	Tennessee (10-2)	Tennessee (12-2)	Oregon State (14-1)	Texas (14-3)	Florida State (19-2)	Louisville (19-3)	Oregon State (21-2)	Florida State (23-3)	Louisville (23-4)	Oregon State (26-3)	Arizona State (27-5)	Arizona State (27-5)	9.
10.	Kentucky	Louisville (2-0)	Kentucky (4-0)	Maryland (6-1)	Louisville (8-1)	Louisville (9-1)	Duke (8-3)	Maryland (10-2)	Maryland (11-2)	North Carolina (15-2)	Texas A&M (16-3)	Kentucky (16-4)	Arizona State (20-2)	Kentucky (18-5)	Kentucky (19-6)	Arizona State (24-4)	Louisville (24-5)	Oregon St (26-4)	Oregon St (26-4)	10.
11.	Louisville	North Carolina (2-0)	Louisville (4-0)	Baylor (4-1)	Maryland (7-2)	Maryland (8-2)	Tennessee (9-2)	Kentucky (11-2)	Kentucky (13-2)	Kentucky (14-3)	North Carolina (16-3)	Arizona State (18-2)	North Carolina (18-4)	Duke (18-6)	Iowa (21-4)	North Carolina (22-6)	Kentucky (21-8)	Kentucky (23-9)	Kentucky (23-9)	11.
12.	Texas	Baylor (1-1)	North Carolina (4-0)	Cal (6-0)	Duke (5-3)	Tennessee (7-2)	Oregon State (10-0)	Duke (8-4)	Duke (10-4)	Texas A&M (15-3)	Arizona State (17-1)	North Carolina (17-4)	Kentucky (17-5)	Arizona State (21-3)	Duke (19-7)	Texas A&M (22-6)	North Carolina (23-7)	North Carolina (24-8)	North Carolina (24-8)	12.
13.	North Carolina	Texas (1-0)	Baylor (1-1)	Kentucky (6-1)	Tennessee (6-2)	Duke (5-3)	Kentucky (10-2)	Oregon State (10-1)	Oregon State (12-1)	Stanford (12-4)	Duke (13-5)	Texas (14-4)	Texas A&M (17-5)	Iowa (19-4)	Arizona State (22-4)	Mississippi State (25-4)	Mississippi State (26-5)	Princeton (29-0)	Princeton (30-0)	13.
14.	Cal	Cal (1-0)	Cal (4-0)	Tennessee (4-2)	Oregon State (7-0)	Oregon State (7-0)	Nebraska (10-1)	Oklahoma State (10-1)	Stanford (10-4)	Duke (11-5)	Kentucky (15-4)	Texas A&M (16-5)	Stanford (17-5)	North Carolina (19-5)	North Carolina (20-6)	Princeton (25-0)	Princeton (27-0)	Mississippi State (26-6)	Mississippi State (26-6)	14.
15.	Michigan State	Nebraska (2-0)	Nebraska (4-0)	Nebraska (6-0)	Nebraska (7-1)	Nebraska (9-1)	Stanford (7-4)	Stanford (8-4)	Mississippi State (17-0)	Nebraska (12-3)	Nebraska (14-3)	Stanford (15-5)	Duke (16-6)	Mississippi State (23-3)	Texas A&M (20-6)	Kentucky (19-8)	Iowa (23-6)	Iowa (24-7)	Iowa (24-7)	15.
16.	Nebraska	West Virginia (2-0)	Iowa (4-0)	Michigan State (4-1)	Oklahoma State (6-1)	Oklahoma State (7-1)	Georgia (12-0)	Nebraska (10-2)	Oklahoma State (10-2)	Georgia (15-2)	Stanford (13-5)	Duke (14-6)	Texas (15-5)	Texas A&M (18-6)	Mississippi State (24-4)	Iowa (21-6)	Duke (20-9)	Duke (21-10)	Duke (21-10)	16.
17.	West Virginia	Michigan State (1-0)	Michigan State (2-1)	Oklahoma State (5-1)	Cal (7-1)	Georgia (10-0)	Oklahoma State (9-1)	Rutgers (10-2)	Iowa (11-2)	Arizona State (15-1)	Florida State (17-2)	Iowa (16-3)	Iowa (17-4)	Rutgers (18-5)	Princeton (21-0)	Duke (19-8)	Texas A&M (22-8)	Stanford (24-9)	Stanford (24-9)	17.
18.	DePaul	Iowa (2-0)	DePaul (4-1)	Oregon State (5-0)	Georgia (10-0)	West Virginia (8-1)	Rutgers (9-2)	Mississippi State (15-0)	Nebraska (10-3)	Mississippi State )18-1)	Iowa (14-3)	Mississippi State (21-2)	Nebraska (17-4)	Princeton (21-0)	Rutgers (19-6)	Rutgers (20-7)	Chattanooga (26-3)	Chattanooga (29-3)	Chattanooga (29-3)	18.
19.	Iowa	Oklahoma State (2-0)	Oklahoma State (3-1)	Iowa (6-1)	Rutgers (7-1)	Rutgers (8-2)	Mississippi State (14-0)	Georgia (12-1)	Georgia (13-2)	Florida State (15-2)	Georgia (16-3)	Nebraska (15-4)	Mississippi State (22-3)	Stanford (17-7)	Stanford (19-7)	Chattanooga (25-3) т	George Washington (26-3)	George Washington (29-3) т	George Washington (29-3)	19.
20.	Oklahoma State	DePaul (2-1)	Oregon State (3-0)	Rutgers (6-0)	West Virginia (6-1)	Mississippi State (11-0)	Iowa (9-2)	Iowa (10-2)	Arizona State (13-1)	Oklahoma State (11-3)	Mississippi State (19-2)	Georgia (17-4)	Princeton (19-0)	Nebraska (17-6)	Nebraska (18-7)	Stanford (20-8) т	Stanford (21-9)	Texas A&M (23-9) т	Texas A&M (23-9)	20.
21.	Oregon State	Oregon State (2-0)	West Virginia (2-1)	West Virginia (4-1)	Michigan State (5-2)	Michigan State (6-2)	West Virginia (9-2)	West Virginia (10-2)	Syracuse (10-4)	Iowa (12-3)	Princeton (17-0)	Princeton (17-0)	Georgia (17-5)	George Washington (21-2)	James Madison (22-2)	George Washington (22-3)	Florida Gulf Coast (27-2)	Florida Gulf Coast (28-2)	Florida Gulf Coast (30-2)	21.
22.	Dayton	Syracuse (1-0)	Syracuse (2-0)	Syracuse (5-1)	Mississippi State (8-0)	Syracuse (7-1)	Michigan State (8-3)	Syracuse (9-3)	Florida State (13-2)	Rutgers (12-4)	Syracuse (13-5)	Syracuse (15-5)	Rutgers (16-5)	Syracuse (17-7)	Chattanooga (23-3)	Florida Gulf Coast (23-2)	Rutgers (21-8)	Seton Hall (27-4)	Rutgers (22-9)	22.
23.	UCLA	James Madison (2-0)	James Madison (4-0)	Georgia (7-0)	Syracuse (6-1)	Cal (7-2)	Syracuse (8-3)	Washington (11-1)	Rutgers (10-4)	Princeton (17-0)	Rutgers (13-5)	Rutgers (14-5)	George Washington (19-2)	Texas (15-7)	George Washington (22-3)	Nebraska (18-8)	Seton Hall (26-4)	Rutgers (22-9)	Ohio State (23-10)	23.
24.	LSU	Rutgers (1-0)	Rutgers (3-0)	DePaul (4-2)	Iowa (7-2)	Iowa (8-2)	James Madison (9-1)	DePaul (9-4)	Princeton (16-0)	Syracuse (11-5)	George Washington (16-2)	George Washington (18-2)	Seton Hall (20-2)	Seton Hall (21-3)	Florida Gulf Coast (23-2)	Texas (18-8)	Syracuse (21-8)	Ohio State (23-10)	Seton Hall (28-5)	24.
25.	Syracuse	South Florida (2-0)	Georgia (4-0)	Mississippi State (6-0)	DePaul (6-2)	St. John's (9-0)	DePaul (8-4)	Northwestern (11-1)	West Virginia (10-3)	USF (13-3)	Seton Hall (17-2)	Seton Hall (19-2)	Syracuse (15-7)	USF (19-4)	Texas (16-8)	Seton Hall (24-4)	Nebraska (20-9)	Northwestern (23-8)	South Florida (26-7)	25.
	Preseason Nov. 10	Week 2 Nov. 18	Week 3 Nov. 25	Week 4 Dec. 2	Week 5 Dec. 9	Week 6 Dec. 16	Week 7 Dec. 23	Week 8 Dec. 30	Week 9 Jan. 6	Week 10 Jan. 13	Week 11 Jan. 20	Week 12 Jan. 27	Week 13 Feb. 3	Week 14 Feb. 10	Week 15 Feb. 17	Week 16 Feb. 24	Week 17 Mar. 3	Week 18 Mar. 10	Final	
		Dropped: Dayton (0-2); UCLA (0-2); LSU (2-1)	Dropped: South Florida (3-1)	Dropped: James Madison (5-1)	None	Dropped: DePaul (6-3)	Dropped: Cal (7-3); St. John's (7-4)	Dropped: Michigan State (8-4); James Madison (9-2)	Dropped: Washington (12-2); DePaul (10-5); Northwestern (12-2)	Dropped: West Virginia (9-5)	Dropped: Oklahoma State (12-4); USF (14-4)	None	None	Dropped: Georgia (17-6)	Dropped: Syracuse (18-8); Seton Hall (22-4); USF (20-5)	Dropped: James Madison (23-3)	Dropped: Texas (19-9)	Dropped: Syracuse (21-9); Nebraska (21-10)	Dropped: Northwestern (23-8)	

== See also ==
- 2014–15 NCAA Division I men's basketball rankings
