= Jewel Creek =

Stream in Muskego, Wisconsin

Coordinates: 42°55′29″N 88°08′36″W

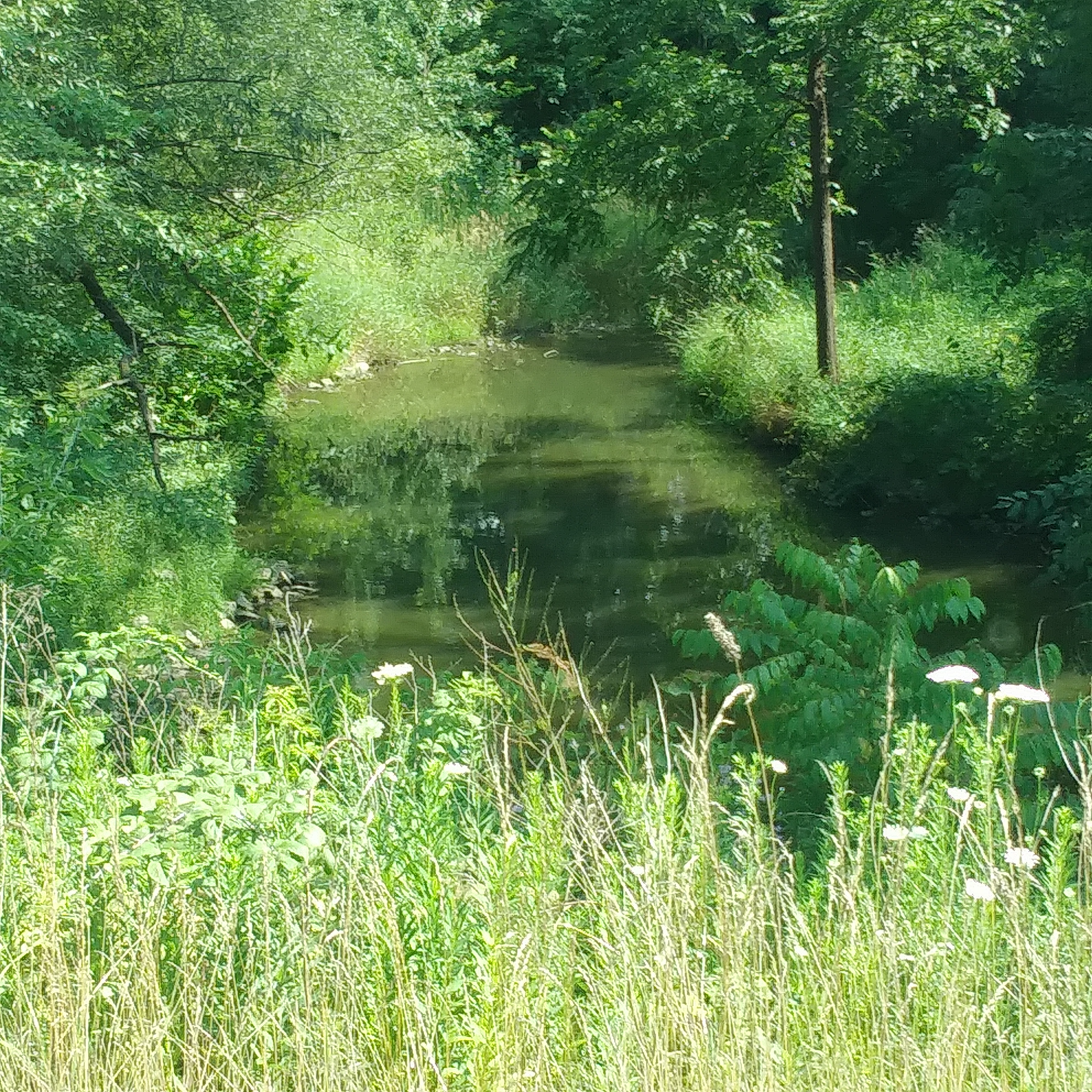
Jewel Creek, as seen from College Avenue

Jewel Creek is a stream in Muskego, Wisconsin. It flows from Linnie Lac to Little Muskego Lake, and is the primary tributary of Little Muskego Lake. Despite its relative proximity to Lake Michigan, Jewel Creek is part of the Mississippi River Watershed. Jewel Creek has a drainage area of 8.16 square miles. Between the years 2000 and 2003, its average flow rate was 6.52 cubic feet per second.

== Dams ==
Although it is only 0.75 miles long, Jewel creek is dammed twice. The first dam creates Linnie Lac and is designated as a New Berlin Landmark. The original dam at Linnie Lac was built in 1836 and used to power a sawmill, making it the first dam and sawmill in Waukesha County. There have been several dams in that location since, the newest being completed in 2000.

Roughly ½ mile downstream from Linnie Lac there is a second, unnamed dam. In 2015 the Wisconsin Department of Natural Resources planned to remove the dam, but local residents objected, arguing that removal of the dam would increase silt deposits downstream, jeopardizing boat access to Little Muskego Lake for the houses along Jewel Creek. Additionally removing the dam would fill in a popular fishing hole. As of 2019, the dam remained.
