= 2014–15 Florida Gulf Coast Eagles women's basketball team =

Intercollegiate basketball season

2014–15 Florida Gulf Coast Eagles women's basketball
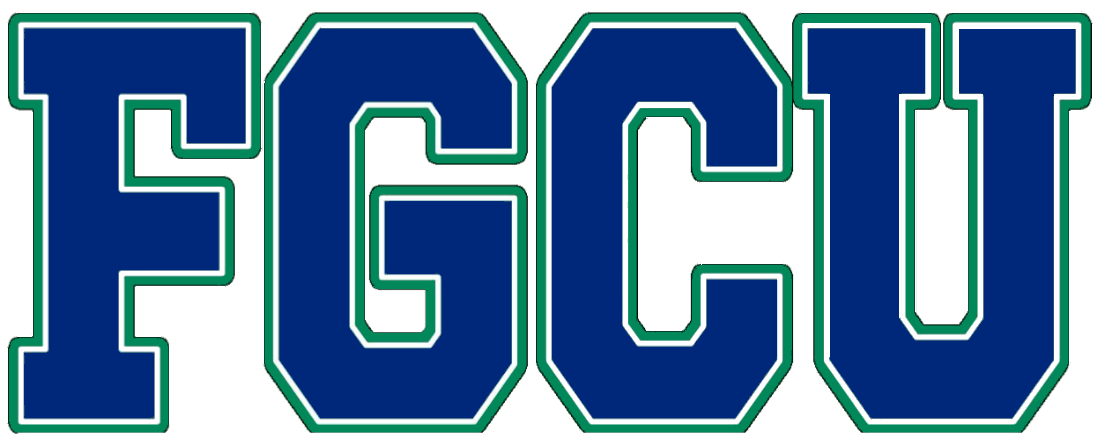

Paradise Jam Island Division Tournament Champions Atlantic Sun Regular Season & Tournament Champions

NCAA Women's tournament, second round
- Conference: Atlantic Sun Conference

Ranking
- Coaches: No. 21
- AP: No. 20
- Record: 31–3 (14–0 A-Sun)
- Head coach: Karl Smesko (13th season)
- Assistant coaches: Chelsea Dermyer (7th season); Nicki Collen (1st season); Chelsea Lyles (4th season)
- Home arena: Alico Arena

2014–15 Atlantic Sun women's basketball standings
	Conf.				Overall
Team	W		L	PCT	W		L	PCT
No. 20 Florida Gulf Coast†	14	–	0	1.000	31	–	3	.912
Stetson	11	–	3	.786	23	–	8	.742
Northern Kentucky*	8	–	6	.571	19	–	14	.576
Kennesaw State	6	–	8	.429	17	–	13	.567
USC Upstate	6	–	8	.429	14	–	16	.467
Jacksonville	6	–	8	.429	12	–	17	.414
Lipscomb	3	–	11	.214	8	–	21	.276
North Florida	2	–	12	.143	11	–	19	.367
† 2015 Atlantic Sun Tournament winner As of March 23, 2015; Rankings from AP poll *Ineligible for postseason play due to Div. I transition

The 2014–15 Florida Gulf Coast Eagles women's basketball team represented Florida Gulf Coast University (FGCU) in the 2014–15 NCAA Division I women's basketball season. The Eagles were coached by 13th year head coach Karl Smesko and were members of the Atlantic Sun Conference. They finished the season 31–3, 14–0 in A-Sun play to win the Atlantic Sun regular season title. They also won the Atlantic Sun Tournament to earn an automatic to the 2015 NCAA Division I women's basketball tournament, where they lost to Florida State in the second round.

== Media ==
All home games and conference road will be shown on ESPN3 or A-Sun.TV. Road games will also be broadcast on the FGCU Portal.

== Roster ==
2014–15 Florida Gulf Coast Eagles women's basketball team
Players
Coaches

Pos.	#	Name	Height	Year	Previous school	Hometown
G	0	DyTiesha Dunson	5 ft 8 in (1.73 m)	Jr	Westover HS	Albany, GA
G	1	Jessica Cattani (W)	5 ft 7 in (1.7 m)	RS Fr	Muskego High School	Muskego, WI
G	2	Kaneisha Atwater	5 ft 7 in (1.7 m)	Jr	VCU/Fort Pierce Westwood HS	Fort Pierce, FL
F	3	Katie Meador	5 ft 11 in (1.8 m)	Jr	Salem Community HS	Salem, IL
F	4	Bethany Murrell	5 ft 10 in (1.78 m)	Jr	New Palestine HS	New Palestine, IN
G	5	Kady Schrann	5 ft 9 in (1.75 m)	Sr	York Catholic HS; Vanderbilt	York, PA
G	10	Tayler Goodall	5 ft 9 in (1.75 m)	Fr	Columbus North HS	Columbus, IN
G	11	Amanda Moore	5 ft 10 in (1.78 m)	Jr	Seymour HS	Seymour, IN
G	12	Stephanie Haas	5 ft 8 in (1.73 m)	Jr	Magnificat HS	Avon Lake, OH
F	13	Anthi Chatzigiakoumi	6 ft 1 in (1.85 m)	Sr	General Sr. HS of Kallithea	Athens, Greece
G	14	Whitney Knight	6 ft 3 in (1.91 m)	RS Jr	R.J. Reynolds HS	Winston-Salem, NC
G	15	Randa Payne (W)	5 ft 9 in (1.75 m)	RS Fr	Mansfield St. Peters HS	Mansfield, OH
F	20	Haley Laughter	5 ft 11 in (1.8 m)	RS Fr	Carolina Day School	Asheville, NC
G	21	Jaime Gluesing	5 ft 10 in (1.78 m)	Jr	Solon HS	Solon, OH
G	22	Jenna Cobb (C)	5 ft 7 in (1.7 m)	RS Sr	Miami Trace HS/Butler	New Holland, OH
G	23	Morgan Blumer	5 ft 11 in (1.8 m)	RS Fr	Milton HS	Milton, WI
G	24	Taylor Gradinjan	5 ft 9 in (1.75 m)	RS Fr	Cudahy HS	Cudahy, WI

Head coach

- Karl Smesko (Kent State)

Assistant coach(es)

- Chelsea Dermyer (Florida Gulf Coast)
- Nicki Collen (Marquette)
- Chelsea Lyles (Florida Gulf Coast)

Legend

- (C) Team captain
- (S) Suspended
- (I) Ineligible
- (W) Walk-on
- Injured
- Current redshirt

Roster
Last update: 2014-10-18

== Schedule ==
Date time, TV	Rank^{#}	Opponent^{#}	Result	Record	Site (attendance) city, state
Regular season
11/14/2014*; 7:00 pm, ESPN3		George Washington	W 88–75	1–0	Alico Arena (1,879); Fort Myers, FL
11/18/2014*; 7:00 pm, ESPN3		FIU	W 97–49	2–0	Alico Arena (1,562); Fort Myers, FL
11/20/2014*; 7:00 pm		at Auburn	L 69–72	2–1	Auburn Arena (1,534); Auburn, AL
11/23/2014*; 5:00 pm, ESPN3		Ave Maria	W 102–54	3–1	Alico Arena (1,402); Fort Myers, FL
11/27/2014*; 3:30 pm		vs. Wichita State; Paradise Jam tournament	W 56–39	4–1	Sports and Fitness Center (525); Saint Thomas, USVI
11/28/2014*; 3:30 pm		vs. Clemson; Paradise Jam Tournament	W 86–61	5–1	Sports and Fitness Center (486); Saint Thomas, USVI
11/29/2014*; 1:15 pm		vs. Ohio State; Paradise Jam Tournament	L 83–90 ^{OT}	5–2	Sports and Fitness Center (421); Saint Thomas, USVI
12/06/2014*; 7:00 pm, ESPN3		Southern Miss	W 78–62	6–2	Alico Arena (1,624); Fort Myers, FL
12/11/2014*; 7:00 pm, ESPN3		Providence	W 68–58	7–2	Alico Arena (1,503); Fort Myers, FL
12/17/2014*; 7:00 pm		at Bethune-Cookman	W 91–46	8–2	Moore Gymnasium (93); Daytona Beach, FL
12/19/2014*; 3:30 pm, ESPN3		Northern Colorado	W 69–56	9–2	Alico Arena (1,207); Fort Myers, FL
12/22/2014*; 7:00 pm		at Arkansas State	W 74–68	10–2	Convocation Center (996); Jonesboro, AR
12/28/2014*; 4:00 pm		vs. Cal State Northridge; Hawk Classic semifinals	W 73–64	11–2	Hagan Arena (1,278); Philadelphia, PA
12/29/2014*; 4:00 pm		vs. Quinnipiac; Hawk Classic championship	W 71–65	12–2	Hagan Arena (1,051); Philadelphia, PA
01/02/2015*; 7:00 pm		at Harvard	W 68–58	13–2	Lavietes Pavilion (412); Cambridge, MA
01/10/2015; 4:00 pm, ESPN3		Stetson	W 57–55	14–2 (1–0)	Alico Arena (3,253); Fort Myers, FL
01/14/2015; 7:00 pm, ESPN3		North Florida	W 75–42	15–2 (2–0)	Alico Arena (1,504); Fort Myers, FL
01/17/2015; 7:00 pm, ESPN3		at Jacksonville	W 60–37	16–2 (3–0)	Swisher Gymnasium (612); Jacksonville, FL
01/22/2015; 7:00 pm, ESPN3		USC Upstate	W 79–61	17–2 (4–0)	Alico Arena (1,426); Fort Myers, FL
01/24/2015; 7:00 pm, ESPN3		Kennesaw State	W 61–47	18–2 (5–0)	Alico Arena (2,309); Fort Myers, FL
01/29/2015; 7:30 pm, ESPN3		at Lipscomb	W 71–49	19–2 (6–0)	Allen Arena (N/A); Nashville, TN
01/31/2015; 7:00 pm, ESPN3		at Northern Kentucky	W 67–46	20–2 (7–0)	The Bank of Kentucky Center (1,684); Highland Heights, KY
02/07/2015; 1:00 pm, ESPN3		at Stetson	W 61–39	21–2 (8–0)	Edmunds Center (2,015); DeLand, FL
02/12/2015; 7:00 pm, ESPN3		Northern Kentucky	W 75–47	22–2 (9–0)	Alico Arena (2,633); Fort Myers, FL
02/14/2015; 7:00 pm, ESPN3		Lipscomb	W 69–43	23–2 (10–0)	Alico Arena (1,762); Fort Myers, FL
02/19/2015; 7:00 pm, ESPN3	No. 22	at Kennesaw State	W 71–60	24–2 (11–0)	KSU Convocation Center (356); Kennesaw, GA
02/21/2015; 2:00 pm, ESPN3	No. 22	at USC Upstate	W 75–59	25–2 (12–0)	G. B. Hodge Center (275); Spartanburg, SC
02/25/2015; 7:00 pm, ESPN3	No. 21	at North Florida	W 56–24	26–2 (13–0)	UNF Arena (386); Jacksonville, FL
02/28/2015; 7:00 pm, ESPN3	No. 21	Jacksonville	W 78–47	27–2 (14–0)	Alico Arena (3,121); Fort Myers, FL
Atlantic Sun Tournament
03/06/2015; 7:00 pm, ESPN3	No. 20	North Florida; Quarterfinals	W 74–35	28–2	Alico Arena (1,806); Fort Myers, FL
03/11/2015; 7:00 pm, ESPN3	No. 20	Jacksonville; Semifinals	W 62–42	29–2	Alico Arena (2,562); Fort Myers, FL
03/15/2015; 2:30 pm, ESPN3	No. 20	Northern Kentucky; Championship	W 60–43	30–2	Alico Arena (3,011); Fort Myers, FL
NCAA Women's tournament
03/21/2015*; 11:00 am, ESPN2	No. 20	vs. Oklahoma State; First Round	W 75–67	31–2	Donald L. Tucker Center (4,591); Tallahassee, FL
03/23/2015*; 6:00 pm, ESPNU	No. 20	at No. 7 Florida State; Second Round	L 47–65	31–3	Donald L. Tucker Center (4,772); Tallahassee, FL
*Non-conference game. ^{#}Rankings from AP Poll. (#) Tournament seedings in parentheses. All times are in Eastern Time.

== Rankings ==
Ranking movement Legend: ██ Increase in ranking. ██ Decrease in ranking. NR = Not ranked. RV = Received votes.
Poll	Pre- Season	Week 2	Week 3	Week 4	Week 5	Week 6	Week 7	Week 8	Week 9	Week 10	Week 11	Week 12	Week 13	Week 14	Week 15	Week 16	Week 17	Week 18	Final
AP	NR	NR	NR	NR	NR	NR	NR	NR	NR	NR	NR	NR	RV	RV	22	21	20	20	20
Coaches	NR	NR	NR	NR	NR	NR	NR	NR	NR	NR	NR	RV	RV	RV	24	22	21	21	21

== See also ==
- 2014–15 Florida Gulf Coast Eagles men's basketball team
