= Little Muskego Lake =

Lake in Waukesha County, Wisconsin, US

- Location in Southeastern Wisconsin
- Location: Waukesha County, Wisconsin
- Coordinates: 42°54′54″N 88°08′33″W
- Type: Mesotrophic
- Primary inflows: Jewel Creek
- Basin countries: United States
- Max. length: 2,092.15 m (6,864 ft)
- Max. width: 902.96 m (2,962 ft)
- Surface area: 470 acres (190.2 ha)
- Average depth: 14 m (46 ft)
- Max. depth: 65 ft (20 m)
- Water volume: 7,170 acre⋅ft (8,844,064.8 m^{3})
- Surface elevation: 244 m (801 ft)

Little Muskego Lake is located in Muskego, Waukesha County, Wisconsin, along a tributary of the Fox River. It is populated by musk grass, water celery, and several invasive plant species. Fishing is permitted for personal consumption only. Bass and panfish are most commonly caught. It hosts many recreational activities, including boating, swimming, waterskiing, and ice fishing. Its mean depth is 14 meters (46 feet) with an area of 190.2 hectares (470 acres).

== Geography ==
Little Muskego sits atop the Troy Valley Bedrock aquifer, composed primarily of sandstone with layers of glacial till and clay. The vast majority of lakes in this area were created when the Laurentide ice sheet withdrew some 10,000 years ago.

== Hydrology ==
Little Muskego is considered to be a drainage lake: most of its water comes from Jewel Creek at the north end. Outflow discharges into Muskego Creek, Big Muskego Lake, Wind Lake, and Fox River. It is also considered a mesotrophic lake. The Wisconsin Department of Natural Resources (DNR) lowers its level each September and October. This drawdown is carried out in increments of less than 4’’ per day with normal levels of 16’’- 20’’; however, extended drawdowns of up to 84” have been used to reduce invasive plant species in the lake.

== History ==
The earliest inhabitants of Muskego were the Potawatomi. In 1827 the first Europeans arrived and within five years, the Potawatomi ceded their lands to the US Government. European expansion continued, with Norwegian settlers predominating by 1839.

== Water chemistry ==
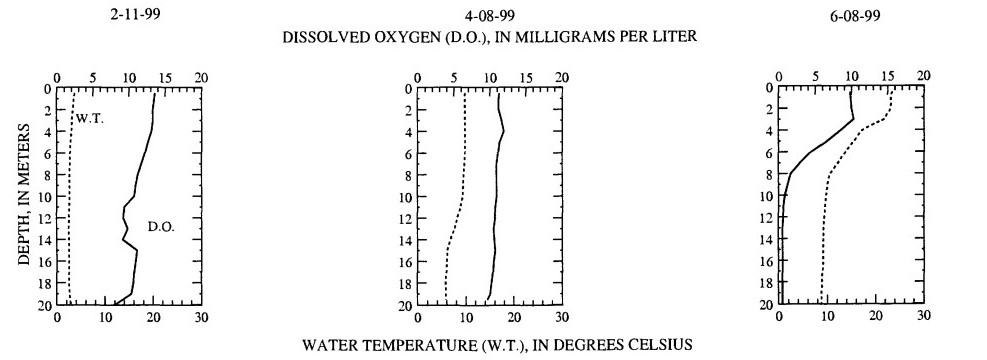
Graph of Dissolved Oxygen and Water Temperature for Little Muskego Year 1999

The average pH for Little Muskego in 1999 was 7.8 The minimum water temperature is 0.5 degrees Celsius (32.9 F) with a maximum of 26.67 degrees Celsius (80.01 F). The average Secchi depth is 1.65 meters (5.4 feet). It is classified as a dimictic lake.

== Pollutants ==
Primary pollutants include phosphorus and heavy metals. Agricultural land use currently results in about 53% of the sediment pollution and half of the phosphorus reaching the lake in surface runoff. It is estimated that 1,690 to 5,016 pounds (767 to 2,275 kilograms) of phosphorus enter the lake yearly. As the areas surrounding Little Muskego continue to be transformed from wetland and agricultural use into urban environments, heavy metal pollution is expected to increase. The Muskego Wind Lakes Watershed created a plan in 1993 to lower non-point source pollutants by reducing 55% of sedimentation and 67% of phosphorus loading.

== Plant species ==
In 1994, muskgrass (Chara vulgaris) was the dominant species in the lake. It also contains water celery (Valisneria americana) and multiple species of pondweed. In a 2002 plant survey, 17 plant species were found.

Invasive plant species of the lake include starry stonewort (Nitellopsis obtusa) and Eurasian water milfoil (Myriophyllum spicatum). These are managed via lake drawdown, herbicide treatment, and mechanical harvesting. In 2020, over 900 loads of weeds were harvested from the lake. The Lake District supports boat inspections and education to prevent the spread of invasive plants. DNR promotes the "Clean Boats, Clean Waters" program.

== Fishing and wildlife ==
Little Muskego thrives as a fishery and wildlife area and is best known for its bass and panfish populations—but walleye, northern pike, catfish, and other rough fish species are also present. Currently no commercial fishing is authorized although personal consumption is allowed.

Waterfowl hunting and trapping are limited to the city of Muskego: both are outlawed on the lake. Muskrats, beaver, squirrel, and cottontail rabbits are the most common animals found in riparian areas of the lake. It also supports populations of mallards, wood duck, and blue-winged teal.

Invasive animal species include the zebra mussel (Dreissena polymorpha).

== Recreation ==
From 1861 to 1977, it was home to Muskego Beach Amusement Park, later known as DandiLion Park. It closed in part due to competition from Six Flags Great America in Gurnee, Illinois.

Boating, swimming, fishing, and waterskiing are popular, as are cross-country skiing, snowmobiling, and ice fishing in the winter. The Muskego Recreation Program holds water-related classes and recreational activities on the lake. There is a local waterskiing team called the Muskego Waterbugs. The Little Muskego Lake Association was formed in 1968.
