= 2015 Atlantic Sun women's basketball tournament =

- Classification: Division I
- Season: 2014–15
- Teams: 8
- Site: campus sites
- Finals site: Alico Arena; Fort Myers, Florida
- Champions: Florida Gulf Coast (3rd title)
- Winning coach: Karl Smesko (3rd title)
- MVP: Whitney Knight (Florida Gulf Coast)
- Television: ESPN3
- Atlantic Sun women's basketball tournaments

2014–15 Atlantic Sun women's basketball standings
	Conf.				Overall
Team	W		L	PCT	W		L	PCT
No. 20 Florida Gulf Coast†	14	–	0	1.000	31	–	3	.912
Stetson	11	–	3	.786	23	–	8	.742
Northern Kentucky*	8	–	6	.571	19	–	14	.576
Kennesaw State	6	–	8	.429	17	–	13	.567
USC Upstate	6	–	8	.429	14	–	16	.467
Jacksonville	6	–	8	.429	12	–	17	.414
Lipscomb	3	–	11	.214	8	–	21	.276
North Florida	2	–	12	.143	11	–	19	.367
† 2015 Atlantic Sun Tournament winner As of March 23, 2015; Rankings from AP poll *Ineligible for postseason play due to Div. I transition

The 2015 Atlantic Sun women's basketball tournament was the 29th edition of the Atlantic Sun Conference Championship. It took place from March 6, 2015 through March 15, 2015 in several arenas. All games took place at the higher-seeded of the two teams competing.

== Format ==
The A-Sun Championship is a six-day single-elimination tournament. Eight teams will compete in the championship.

On July 22. 2014 The A-Sun announced Northern Kentucky will be eligible for all conference postseason championships for which their teams qualify starting with the upcoming 2014-15 academic year, as part of their transition to Division I from Division II, The Norse must still complete the four-year reclassification period before becoming eligible for NCAA Championships. The change in A-Sun policy arose after NCAA clarification that a conference may set specific criteria allowing its highest ranked finisher to be the AQ recipient if a non-eligible team were to participate and win the conference postseason tournament. Prior policy had determined that the conference would lose its AQ if an ineligible team won the tournament.

== Seeds ==
Seed	School	Conference	Overall	Tiebreaker
1	Florida Gulf Coast	14–0	27–2	
2	Stetson	11–3	22–6	
3	Northern Kentucky	8–6	17–12	
4	Jacksonville	6–8	11–16	3-3 vs. Jax, KSU, USCUS
5	Kennesaw State	6–8	17–12	3-3 vs. Jax, KSU, USCUS
6	USC Upstate	6–8	14–15	2-4 vs. Jax, KSU, USCUS
7	Lipscomb	3–11	8–20	
8	North Florida	2–12	11–18	
Overall records are as of the end of the regular season.

== Bracket ==
Quarterfinals; March 6 ESPN3
1	Florida Gulf Coast	74
8	North Florida	35
4	Jacksonville	55
5	Kennesaw State	54
2	Stetson	92
7	Lipscomb	69
3	Northern Kentucky	64
6	USC Upstate	45

Semifinals; March 11; ESPN3
1	Florida Gulf Coast	62
4	Jacksonville	42
2	Stetson	52
3	Northern Kentucky	53

Championship; March 15; ESPN3
1	Florida Gulf Coast	60
3	Northern Kentucky	43

== See also ==
- 2015 Atlantic Sun men's basketball tournament
