= Muskego-Norway School District =

Public school district in Wisconsin

Location
- Muskego, Wisconsin as well as nearby Norway, Wisconsin United States
- Coordinates: 42°53′11.5″N 88°08′56.7″W

District information
- Type: Public School
- Motto: Every student learning, growing . . . succeeding.
- Grades: Pre-K-12
- Superintendent: Jeffrey Petersen (Interim Superintendent)
- Accreditation: North Central Accreditation
- Schools: 6
- NCES District ID: 5510170

Students and staff
- Students: 4,602 (2024–2025)
- Faculty: 304.35 (on an FTE basis)
- Staff: 586.87
- Student–teacher ratio: 15.12
- Athletic conference: WIAA Classic 8 Conference

Other information
- Website: www.muskegonorway.org

The Muskego-Norway School District is a school district in southeastern Wisconsin that serves students in the Waukesha County suburb of Muskego, part of Norway, a small part of New Berlin, and most of Wind Lake. The district has an enrollment of over 4,000 students in three elementary schools, two middle schools, and one high school.

== Schools ==
| School | Grades |
|---|---|
| Bay Lane Elementary School | K-4 |
| Lakeview Elementary School | K-4 |
| Mill Valley Elementary School | K-4 |
| Lake Denoon Middle School | 5-8 |
| Muskego Lakes Middle School | 5-8 |
| Muskego High School | 9-12 |
