= 2014–15 Jacksonville Dolphins women's basketball team =

Intercollegiate basketball season

2014–15 Jacksonville Dolphins women's basketball
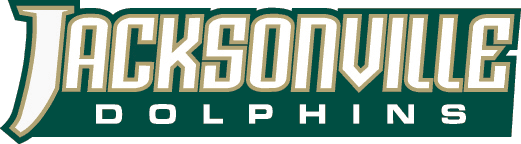
- Conference: Atlantic Sun Conference
- Record: 12–17 (6–8 A-Sun)
- Head coach: Yolett McPhee-McCuin (2nd season)
- Assistant coaches: Darnell Haney (2nd season); Camille Collier (2nd season); Brandon Rohr (2nd season)
- Home arena: Swisher Gymnasium

2014–15 Atlantic Sun women's basketball standings
	Conf.				Overall
Team	W		L	PCT	W		L	PCT
No. 20 Florida Gulf Coast†	14	–	0	1.000	31	–	3	.912
Stetson	11	–	3	.786	23	–	8	.742
Northern Kentucky*	8	–	6	.571	19	–	14	.576
Kennesaw State	6	–	8	.429	17	–	13	.567
USC Upstate	6	–	8	.429	14	–	16	.467
Jacksonville	6	–	8	.429	12	–	17	.414
Lipscomb	3	–	11	.214	8	–	21	.276
North Florida	2	–	12	.143	11	–	19	.367
† 2015 Atlantic Sun Tournament winner As of March 23, 2015; Rankings from AP poll *Ineligible for postseason play due to Div. I transition

The 2014–15 Jacksonville Dolphins women's basketball team represented Jacksonville University in the 2014–15 NCAA Division I women's basketball season. The Dolphins were coached by second year head coach Yolett McPhee-McCuin and were a member of the Atlantic Sun Conference. They finished the season 12–17, 6-8 for a three-way tie for a fourth-place finish. They advance to the semifinals of the 2015 Atlantic Sun women's basketball tournament, where they lost to Florida Gulf Coast.

== Media ==
All home games and conference road were shown on ESPN3 or A-Sun.TV. Road games will typically be available on the opponents website.

== 2014–15 roster ==
2014–15 Jacksonville Dolphins women's basketball team
Players
Coaches

Pos.	#	Name	Height	Year	Previous school	Hometown
G	1	Loliya Briggs	5 ft 11 in (1.8 m)	Jr	Potters House Christian Academy (Pittsburgh)	Gainesville, Fla.
G	2	LaDeyah Forte'	5 ft 4 in (1.63 m)	RS So	Pensacola	Pensacola, Fla.
G	3	April Carson	5 ft 8 in (1.73 m)	Sr	UNC Greensboro	Weston, Fla.
G	4	Brandi Buie	5 ft 8 in (1.73 m)	Fr	Randolph-Clay	Tampa, Fla.
F	5	Imani Kyser	6 ft 0 in (1.83 m)	Fr	Madison Academy	Madison, Ala.
G	10	Jazlynd Rollins	5 ft 7 in (1.7 m)	Fr	Bucholz	Gainesville, Fla.
G	12	Keanua Williams	5 ft 10 in (1.78 m)	Fr	Crestwood	Sumpter, S.C.
F	13	Kimberly Dawkins	6 ft 0 in (1.83 m)	So	Jonesboro	Atlanta, Ga.
F	15	Kayla Gordon	6 ft 0 in (1.83 m)	Fr	Meridian	Meridian, Miss.
F	21	Christin Mercer	6 ft 1 in (1.85 m)	RS So	Douglas County (Florida)	Douglasville, Ga.
G	22	Sherranda Reddick	5 ft 8 in (1.73 m)	So	Ribault	Jacksonville, Fla.
F	24	Briona Brown	5 ft 11 in (1.8 m)	Jr	Haines City	Haines City, Fla.
G	34	Shaleighya Sulton	5 ft 11 in (1.8 m)	Fr	Chapin	Chapin, S.C.
C	42	Jenny Vernet	6 ft 2 in (1.88 m)	So	Paulding County	Port-Au-Prince, Haiti
			—

Head coach

Yolett McPhee-McCuin (Rhode Island)

Assistant coach(es)

Darnell Haney (Florida A&M)
Camille Collier (Wake Forest)

Legend

- (C) Team captain
- (S) Suspended
- (I) Ineligible
- (W) Walk-on
- Injured
- Current redshirt

Roster
Last update: 2014-09-14

== Schedule ==
Date time, TV	Rank^{#}	Opponent^{#}	Result	Record	Site (attendance) city, state
Regular Season
11/14/2014*; 3:15 pm		at Florida	L 73–84	0–1	O'Connell Center (1,439); Gainesville, FL
11/18/2014*; 5:00 pm		at Georgia Southern	L 65–78	0–2	Hanner Fieldhouse (1,079); Statesboro, GA
11/20/2014*; 7:00 pm		Bethune-Cookman	W 64–51	1–2	Swisher Gymnasium (217); Jacksonville, FL
11/22/2014*; 3:00 pm		No. 23 Syracuse	L 61–77	1–3	Swisher Gymnasium (576); Jacksonville, FL
11/25/2014*; 7:00 pm		at UCF	L 59–71	1–4	CFE Arena (1,238); Orlando, FL
12/02/2014*; 7:00 pm		Trinity Baptist	W 98–24	2–4	Swisher Gymnasium (378); Jacksonville, FL
12/06/2014*; 7:00 pm		at Miami (FL)	L 36–65	2–5	BankUnited Center (638); Coral Gables, FL
12/14/2014*; 2:00 pm		FIU	W 76–64	3–5	Swisher Gymnasium (201); Jacksonville, FL
12/18/2014*; 7:00 pm		at Tennessee State	L 61–64	3–6	Gentry Center (308); Nashville, TN
12/20/2014*; 2:00 pm		at Murray State	L 62–80	3–7	CFSB Center (2,979); Murray, KY
12/29/2014*; 7:00 pm, ESPN3		at Florida State	L 46–73	3–8	Donald L. Tucker Center (2,348); Tallahassee, FL
01/01/2015*; 2:00 pm		Thomas	W 65–38	4–8	Swisher Gymnasium (174); Jacksonville, FL
01/04/2015*; 4:30 pm		at Savannah State	W 45–41	5–8	Tiger Arena (310); Savannah, GA
01/10/2015; 1:00 pm, ESPN3		North Florida	W 54–52	6–8 (1–0)	Veterans Memorial Arena (677); Jacksonville, FL
01/14/2015; 7:00 pm, ESPN3		at Stetson	L 47–73	6–9 (1–1)	Edmunds Center (510); DeLand, FL
01/17/2015; 7:00 pm, ESPN3		Florida Gulf Coast	L 37–60	6–10 (1–2)	Swisher Gymnasium (612); Jacksonville, FL
01/22/2015; 7:00 pm, ESPN3		Lipscomb	L 63–75	6–11 (1–3)	Swisher Gymnasium (819); Jacksonville, FL
01/24/2015; 2:00 pm		Northern Kentucky	L 59–70	6–12 (1–4)	Swisher Gymnasium (819); Jacksonville, FL
01/29/2015; 7:00 pm, ESPN3		at USC Upstate	L 64–66	6–13 (1–5)	G. B. Hodge Center (302); Spartanburg, SC
01/31/2015; 7:00 pm, ESPN3		at Kennesaw State	W 78–64	7–13 (2–5)	KSU Convocation Center (724); Kennesaw, GA
02/07/2015; 2:00 pm, ESPN3		at North Florida	W 68–56	8–13 (3–5)	UNF Arena (524); Jacksonville, FL
02/12/2015; 7:00 pm, ESPN3		Kennesaw State	W 73–70	9–13 (4–5)	Swisher Gymnasium (312); Jacksonville, FL
02/14/2015; 2:00 pm		USC Upstate	L 58–60	9–14 (4–6)	Swisher Gymnasium (N/A); Jacksonville, FL
02/19/2015; 7:00 pm, ESPN3		at Northern Kentucky	W 76–62	10–14 (5–6)	The Bank of Kentucky Center (1,180); Highland Heights, KY
02/21/2015; 5:00 pm, ESPN3		at Lipscomb	W 75–63	11–14 (6–6)	Allen Arena (322); Nashville, TN
02/25/2015; 7:00 pm, ESPN3		Stetson	L 67–73	11–15 (6–7)	Swisher Gymnasium (311); Jacksonville, FL
02/28/2015; 7:00 pm, ESPN3		at No. 21 Florida Gulf Coast	L 47–78	11–16 (6–8)	Alico Arena (3,121); Fort Myers, FL
2015 Atlantic Sun Tournament
03/06/2015; 7:00 pm, ESPN3		vs. Kennesaw State; Quarterfinals	W 55–54	12–16	Swisher Gymnasium (637); Jacksonville, FL
03/11/2015; 7:00 pm, ESPN3		at No. 20 Florida Gulf Coast; Semifinals	L 42–62	12–17	Allico Arena (2,562); Fort Myers, FL
*Non-conference game. ^{#}Rankings from AP Poll. (#) Tournament seedings in parentheses. All times are in Eastern Time.

== See also ==
- 2014–15 Jacksonville Dolphins men's basketball team
