= 2014–15 Kennesaw State Owls women's basketball team =

Intercollegiate basketball season

2014–15 Kennesaw State Owls women's basketball
- Conference: Atlantic Sun Conference
- Record: 17–13 (6–8 A-Sun)
- Head coach: Nitra Perry (3rd season)
- Assistant coaches: Stacey Franklin (3rd season); Janie Mitchell (2nd season); Talvis Franklin (2nd season)
- Home arena: KSU Convocation Center

2014–15 Atlantic Sun women's basketball standings
	Conf.				Overall
Team	W		L	PCT	W		L	PCT
No. 20 Florida Gulf Coast†	14	–	0	1.000	31	–	3	.912
Stetson	11	–	3	.786	23	–	8	.742
Northern Kentucky*	8	–	6	.571	19	–	14	.576
Kennesaw State	6	–	8	.429	17	–	13	.567
USC Upstate	6	–	8	.429	14	–	16	.467
Jacksonville	6	–	8	.429	12	–	17	.414
Lipscomb	3	–	11	.214	8	–	21	.276
North Florida	2	–	12	.143	11	–	19	.367
† 2015 Atlantic Sun Tournament winner As of March 23, 2015; Rankings from AP poll *Ineligible for postseason play due to Div. I transition

The 2014–15 Kennesaw State Owls women's basketball team represented Kennesaw State University in the 2014–15 NCAA Division I women's basketball season. The Owls were coached by third-year head coach Nitra Perry and were a member of the Atlantic Sun Conference. They finished the season 17-13, 6-8 in A-Sun for a three way tie for a fourth-place finish. They lost in the quarterfinals of the 2015 Atlantic Sun women's basketball tournament to Jacksonville. Despite having 17 wins, they were not invited to a postseason tournament.

== Media ==
All home games and conference road were shown on ESPN3 or A-Sun.TV. Non-conference road games are typically available on the opponent's website.

== Roster ==
2014–15 Kennesaw State Owls women's basketball team
Players
Coaches

Pos.	#	Name	Height	Year	Previous school	Hometown
G	2	Karly Frye	5 ft 4 in (1.63 m)	Jr	Walters State CC	Chuckey, TN
G	3	Clara Young	5 ft 8 in (1.73 m)	So	Samford	Woodstcok, GA
G	4	Kelly Dulkoski	5 ft 8 in (1.73 m)	RS Fr	Carson	China Grove, NC
G	5	Brittany Dixon	5 ft 8 in (1.73 m)	Fr	Hickory	Lenoir, NC
G	10	Kristina Wells	5 ft 9 in (1.75 m)	Sr	Douglas County	Douglasville, GA
F	12	Valescia Dixon	5 ft 10 in (1.78 m)	Sr	Pearl River CC	Jackson, MS
G	13	Neffie Lockley	5 ft 8 in (1.73 m)	Fr	Regis Jesuit	Aurora, CO
G	15	Bria Young	5 ft 7 in (1.7 m)	Sr	Collins Hill	Suwanee, GA
G/F	20	Breonna Mosely	5 ft 8 in (1.73 m)	RS Sr	West Georgia	Hampton, GA
G	23	Tianna Germain	5 ft 2 in (1.57 m)	Fr	South Effingham	Rincon, GA
G	24	Katie Hunt	5 ft 8 in (1.73 m)	RS Fr	Miller Grove	Stone Mountain, GA
F	25	Katie Polinski	6 ft 2 in (1.88 m)	Fr	The Rock School	Gainesville, FL
F	30	Aareon Smith	5 ft 9 in (1.75 m)	So	Butler	Louisville, KY
F	31	Chloe Branch	5 ft 11 in (1.8 m)	So	Sandy Creek	Fayetteville, GA
F	32	Gratia Brooks	5 ft 10 in (1.78 m)	So	Riverwood	Atlanta, GA
F	35	Terar Stewart	5 ft 10 in (1.78 m)	RS Fr	Darlington	Rome, GA
G	42	Deandrea Sawyers	5 ft 8 in (1.73 m)	So	Hunter Lane	Nashville, TN
F	45	Jasmine McAllister	6 ft 1 in (1.85 m)	Jr	Walters State CC	Memphis, TN

Head coach

- Nitra Perry (Mississippi State)

Assistant coach(es)

- Stacey Franklin (Alabama)
- Janie Mitchell (Georgia Tech)
- Talvis Franklin (Mississippi State)

Legend

- (C) Team captain
- (S) Suspended
- (I) Ineligible
- (W) Walk-on
- Injured
- Current redshirt

Roster
Last update: 2014-07-16

== Schedule ==
Date time, TV	Rank^{#}	Opponent^{#}	Result	Record	Site (attendance) city, state
Exhibition
11/08/2014*; 2:00 pm		Emory	W 108–56	–	KSU Convocation Center (N/A); Kennesaw, GA
Regular Season
11/14/2014*; 7:00 pm, ESPN3		College of Charleston	W 68–61	1–0	KSU Convocation Center (633); Kennesaw, GA
11/17/2014*; 7:00 pm		at Tennessee State	W 65–56	2–0	Gentry Center (512); Nashville, TN
11/19/2014*; 7:00 pm		at Georgia Tech	L 48–77	2–1	Hank McCamish Pavilion (593); Atlanta, GA
11/22/2014*; 4:00 pm		at Georgia Southern	W 72–51	3–1	Hanner Fieldhouse (705); Statesboro, GA
11/26/2014*; 12:00 pm		at Seton Hall	L 74–77	3–2	Walsh Gymnasium (361); South Orange, NJ
11/29/2014*; 1:00 pm		at Columbia	W 66–62	4–2	Levien Gymnasium (N/A); New York City, NY
12/03/2014*; 7:00 pm		at Georgia State	W 73–64	5–2	GSU Sports Arena (503); Atlanta, GA
12/06/2014*; 2:30 pm, ESPN3		Murray State	W 65–60	6–2	KSU Convocation Center (544); Kennesaw, GA
12/13/2014*; 2:00 pm, ESPN3		Jacksonville State	W 67–65 ^{OT}	7–2	KSU Convocation Center (432); Kennesaw, GA
12/16/2014*; 5:00 pm, ESPN3		at Mercer	W 76–56	8–2	Hawkins Arena (831); Macon, GA
12/20/2014*; 12:00 pm, ESPN3		Gardner–Webb	W 50–47	9–2	KSU Convocation Center (425); Kennesaw, GA
12/22/2014*; 12:00 pm, ESPN3		Xavier	W 61–60	10–2	KSU Convocation Center (367); Kennesaw, GA
12/29/2014*; 6:00 pm		at Alabama A&M	L 66–73	10–3	Elmore Gymnasium (137); Huntsville, AL
01/02/2015*; 7:00 pm, ESPN3		Florida A&M	W 78–58	11–3	KSU Convocation Center (409); Kennesaw, GA
01/06/2015*; 7:00 pm, ESPN3		Mercer	L 44–55	11–4	KSU Convocation Center (968); Kennesaw, GA
01/10/2015; 4:30 pm, ESPN3		at USC Upstate	W 72–63	12–4 (1–0)	G. B. Hodge Center (388); Spartanburg, SC
01/14/2015; 7:00 pm, ESPN3		Northern Kentucky	W 66–58	13–4 (2–0)	KSU Convocation Center (605); Kennesaw, GA
01/17/2015; 5:00 pm, ESPN3		at Lipscomb	L 61–79	13–5 (2–1)	Allen Arena (694); Nashville, TN
01/22/2015; 7:00 pm, ESPN3		at Stetson	L 64–75	13–6 (2–2)	Edmunds Center (465); DeLand, FL
01/24/2015; 7:05 pm, ESPN3		at Florida Gulf Coast	L 47–61	13–7 (2–3)	Alico Arena (2,309); Fort Myers, FL
01/29/2015; 7:00 pm, ESPN3		North Florida	W 46–40	14–7 (3–3)	KSU Convocation Center (425); Kennesaw, GA
01/31/2015; 7:00 pm, ESPN3		Jacksonville	L 64–78	14–8 (3–4)	KSU Convocation Center (724); Kennesaw, GA
02/07/2015; 12:00 pm, ESPN3		USC Upstate	W 67–55	15–8 (4–4)	KSU Convocation Center (435); Kennesaw, GA
02/12/2015; 7:00 pm		at Jacksonville	L 70–73	15–9 (4–5)	Swisher Gymnasium (312); Jacksonville, FL
02/14/2015; 2:00 pm, ESPN3		at North Florida	W 64–52	16–9 (5–5)	UNF Arena (388); Jacksonville, FL
02/19/2015; 7:00 pm, ESPN3		No. 22 Florida Gulf Coast	L 60–71	16–10 (5–6)	KSU Convocation Center (356); Kennesaw, GA
02/21/2015; 7:00 pm, ESPN3		Stetson	L 58–70	16–11 (5–7)	KSU Convocation Center (803); Kennesaw, GA
02/25/2015; 7:00 pm, ESPN3		at Northern Kentucky	L 61–68	16–12 (5–8)	The Bank of Kentucky Center (1,165); Highland Heights, KY
02/28/2015; 12:00 pm, ESPN3		Lipscomb	W 75–57	17–12 (6–8)	KSU Convocation Center (826); Kennesaw, GA
2015 Atlantic Sun Tournament
03/06/2015; 7:00 pm, ESPN3		at Jacksonville; Quarterfinals	L 54–55	17–13	Swisher Gymnasium (637); Jacksonville, FL
*Non-conference game. ^{#}Rankings from AP Poll. (#) Tournament seedings in parentheses. All times are in Eastern Time.

== See also ==
- 2014–15 Kennesaw State Owls men's basketball team
