= 2014–15 Florida State Seminoles women's basketball team =

Intercollegiate basketball season

2014–15 Florida State Seminoles women's basketball

NCAA tournament (2 Seed), Elite Eight
- Conference: Atlantic Coast Conference

Ranking
- Coaches: No. 7
- AP: No. 7
- Record: 32–5 (14–2 ACC)
- Head coach: Sue Semrau (18th year)
- Assistant coaches: Lance White; Brooke Wyckoff; Danielle Santos
- Home arena: Donald L. Tucker Center (Capacity: 12,100)

2014–15 ACC women's basketball standings
	Conf.				Overall
Team	W		L	PCT	W		L	PCT
No. 2 Notre Dame^{†}	15	–	1	.938	36	–	3	.923
No. 7 Florida State	14	–	2	.875	32	–	5	.865
No. 8 Louisville	12	–	4	.750	27	–	7	.794
No. 16 Duke	11	–	5	.688	23	–	11	.676
Syracuse	11	–	5	.688	22	–	10	.688
No. 15 North Carolina	10	–	6	.625	26	–	9	.743
Pittsburgh	9	–	7	.563	20	–	12	.625
Miami (FL)	8	–	8	.500	20	–	13	.606
Virginia	7	–	9	.438	17	–	14	.548
NC State	7	–	9	.438	18	–	15	.545
Georgia Tech	7	–	9	.438	19	–	15	.559
Boston College	5	–	11	.313	13	–	17	.433
Wake Forest	2	–	14	.125	13	–	20	.394
Virginia Tech	1	–	15	.063	12	–	20	.375
Clemson	1	–	15	.063	9	–	21	.300
† 2015 ACC tournament winner As of 7 April 2015; Rankings from AP poll

The 2014–15 Florida State Seminoles women's basketball team, variously Florida State or FSU, represented Florida State University during the 2014–15 NCAA Division I women's basketball season. Florida State competed in Division I of the National Collegiate Athletic Association (NCAA). The Seminoles were led by eighteenth year head coach Sue Semrau and played their home games at the Donald L. Tucker Center on the university's Tallahassee, Florida campus. They were members of the Atlantic Coast Conference.

Florida State finished the regular season with a record of 27–3 (14–2 in ACC play), finishing in second place, both school records. They appeared in the finals of the ACC Tournament for the first time, losing to Notre Dame in the championship game and finishing as conference runner-up. The Seminoles were selected to play in the NCAA tournament and received the highest seed in school history. They ended the season in the semifinals after compiling a 32–5 record, setting the school record for most wins in a season and matching their furthest run in the tournament.

== Previous season ==
The Seminoles finished the 2013–14 season 21–12, 7–9 in ACC play to finish in ninth place. They lost in the quarterfinals of the ACC tournament to Notre Dame. They were invited to the NCAA tournament where they lost in the second round to Stanford.

== Roster ==
2014–15 Florida State Seminoles women's basketball team
Players
Coaches

Pos.	#	Name	Height	Year	Previous school	Hometown
G	1	Morgan Jones	6 ft 2 in (1.88 m)	RS Jr	Northwestern	Lake Mary, FL
C	2	Adut Bulgak	6 ft 4 in (1.93 m)	Jr	Archbishop O'Leary; Trinity Valley CC	Edmonton, AB, Canada
G	3	Emiah Bingley	5 ft 7 in (1.7 m)	Jr	Lee's Summit West; Iowa State	Kansas City, MO
G	10	Leticia Romero	5 ft 8 in (1.73 m)	RS So	I.E.S. Joaquín Artiles; Kansas State	Las Palmas, Spain
G	11	Chania Ray	5 ft 8 in (1.73 m)	Fr	Riverdale Baptist	Alexandria, VA
G	12	Brittany Brown	5 ft 8 in (1.73 m)	So	Choctawhatchee	Fort Walton Beach, FL
G	15	Maegan Conwright	5 ft 8 in (1.73 m)	RS Sr	Timberview; Kentucky	Arlington, TX
G/F	20	Shakayla Thomas	5 ft 11 in (1.8 m)	Fr	Sylacauga	Sylacauga, AL
F	23	Ivey Slaughter	6 ft 1 in (1.85 m)	So	Tattnall Square Academy	Macon, GA
G	24	Shakena Richardson	5 ft 4 in (1.63 m)	RS Jr	Neptune; Rutgers	Neptune, NJ
C	25	Ama Degbeon	6 ft 2 in (1.88 m)	Fr	Grunberg	Grünberg, Germany
F	32	Lauren Coleman	6 ft 0 in (1.83 m)	RS Sr	Parkview	Lawrenceville, GA
F	34	Gabby Bevillard	6 ft 3 in (1.91 m)	RS Fr	Oconee	Bishop, GA
C	42	Kai James	6 ft 5 in (1.96 m)	So	Dwyer	West Palm Beach, FL

Head coach

- Sue Semrau (UC San Diego)

Assistant coach(es)

- Lance White (Texas Tech)
- Brooke Wyckoff (Florida State)
- Danielle Santos (Florida)

Legend

- (C) Team captain
- (S) Suspended
- (I) Ineligible
- (W) Walk-on
- Injured
- Current redshirt

Roster
Last update: 2014-07-02

=== Depth chart ===
Pos.	Starting 5	Bench 1	Bench 2
C	Adut Bulgak	Kai James	Ama Degbeon
PF	Ivey Slaughter	Shakayla Thomas
SF	Emiah Bingley	Lauren Coleman
SG	Leticia Romero	Morgan Jones	Shakena Richardson
PG	Brittany Brown	Emiah Bingley	Chania Ray

== Honors ==
- Naismith Trophy Watchlist

Adut Bulgak

- Naismith Coach of the Year Semifinalist

Sue Semrau

- Naismith Coach of the Year Finalist

Sue Semrau

- Pat Summitt Trophy Finalist

Sue Semrau

=== All-ACC ===
Three players were chosen as all-conference selections:

- First Team
  - Adut Bulgak
- Second Team
  - Leticia Romero
- Freshman Team
  - Shakayla Thomas

Shakayla Thomas and Leticia Romero were named to the All-ACC Tournament team. Adut Bulgak and Leticia Romero were named to the Greensboro Regional All-Tournament team.

=== All-Americans ===
- Honorable Mention
  - Adut Bulgak
  - Leticia Romero

== Rankings ==
Legend
	Increase in ranking
	Decrease in ranking
	Not ranked previous week
(RV)	Received Votes

Regular season Polls
Poll	Pre- Season	Week 2	Week 3	Week 4	Week 5	Week 6	Week 7	Week 8	Week 9	Week 10	Week 11	Week 12	Week 13	Week 14	Week 15	Week 16	Week 17	Week 18	Week 19	Final
AP	RV	RV	RV	RV	RV	RV	RV	RV	RV	20	17	9	9	7	9	9	7	7	7	
Coaches	RV	RV	RV	RV	RV	RV	RV	RV	22	19	17	9	8	7	9	8	6	7	7	7

== Schedule ==
In the ACC Media Poll, Florida State was picked to finish fifth in the conference.

Date time, TV	Rank^{#}	Opponent^{#}	Result	Record	High points	High rebounds	High assists	Site (attendance) city, state
Exhibition
November 9*; 2:00 p.m.		Faulkner	W 89–27	0–0	15 – Bulgak	16 – Bulgak	4 – Conwright	Donald L. Tucker Center (-); Tallahassee, FL
Regular season
November 14*; 7:00 p.m., ESPN3		UAB	W 92–62	1–0	19 – Conwright	9 – Slaughter, Bulgak	5 – Richardson	Donald L. Tucker Center (2,687); Tallahassee, FL
November 18*; 11:00 a.m., ESPN3		Bethune-Cookman	W 103–34	2–0	18 – Bulgak	13 – Bulgak	8 – Richardson	Donald L. Tucker Center (3,157); Tallahassee, FL
November 21*; 6:00 p.m.		vs. Eastern Illinois; North Texas Tournament	W 91–55	3–0	21 – Bulgak	7 – Bulgak, James	6 – Richardson	UNT Coliseum (355); Dallas, TX
November 23*; 1:00 p.m.		vs. UMass; North Texas Tournament	W 74–46	4–0	13 – Bulgak	11 – Bulgak	3 – Conwright	UNT Coliseum (573); Dallas, TX
November 27*; 3:30 p.m.		vs. Washington; Cancún Challenge Riviera Division	L 68–80	4–1	14 – Thomas	10 – Thomas	3 – Conwright, Richardson	Moon Palace Golf & Spa Resort (650); Cancún, Mexico
November 28*; 1:00 p.m.		vs. Furman; Cancún Challenge Riviera Division	W 94–63	5–1	18 – Bulgak	10 – Bulgak	6 – Brown	Moon Palace Golf & Spa Resort (650); Cancún, Mexico
November 29*; 3:30 p.m.		vs. Hartford; Cancún Challenge Riviera Division	W 69–59	6–1	16 – Bulgak	7 – Bulgak, Brown	4 – Brown, Conwright	Moon Palace Golf & Spa Resort (650); Cancún, Mexico
December 3*; 7:00 p.m.		at Purdue; ACC–Big Ten Women's Challenge	W 67–64 ^{OT}	7–1	20 – Jones	12 – Bulgak	4 – Conwright	Mackey Arena (5,725); West Lafayette, IN
December 7*; 2:00 p.m., ESPN3		Florida	W 77–51	8–1	18 – Slaughter	12 – Bulgak	5 – Richardson	Donald L. Tucker Center (3,008); Tallahassee, FL
December 14*; 2:00 p.m.		at Temple	W 66–62	9–1	16 – Slaughter	12 – Slaughter	5 – Conwright	McGonigle Hall (816); Philadelphia, PA
December 16*; 7:00 p.m., ESPN3		North Florida	W 79–58	10–1	26 – Bulgak	11 – Bulgak	4 – Brown	Donald L. Tucker Center (2,229); Tallahassee, FL
December 19*; 7:00 p.m., ESPN3		Savannah State	W 97–51	11–1	19 – Thomas	14 – Bulgak	5 – Bingley	Donald L. Tucker Center (2,170); Tallahassee, FL
December 22*; 8:00 p.m.		at Tulane	W 65–54	12–1	21 – Slaughter	11 – Brown	5 – Conwright	Devlin Fieldhouse (1,000); New Orleans, LA
December 29*; 7:00 p.m., ESPN3		Jacksonville	W 73–46	13–1	15 – Jones	10 – Bulgak	6 – Romero	Donald L. Tucker Center (2,438); Tallahassee, FL
January 2; 7:00 p.m.		at No. 4 Notre Dame	L 68–74	13–2 (0–1)	18 – Thomas	8 – Bulgak	3 – Conwright, Jones, Romero	Edmund P. Joyce Center (9,149); South Bend, IN
January 8; 7:00 p.m.		at Clemson	W 85–52	14–2 (1–1)	20 – Conwright	12 – Slaughter	4 – Conwright, Richardson, Romero	Littlejohn Coliseum (557); Clemson, SC
January 11; 1:00 p.m., ESPN3		No. 13 Duke	W 74–58	15–2 (2–1)	18 – Bulgak	18 – Bulgak	5 – Conwright, Jones	Donald L. Tucker Center (3,536); Tallahassee, FL
January 15; 7:00 p.m., ESPN3	No. 20	Pittsburgh	W 58–43	16–2 (3–1)	19 – Romero	10 – Thomas	3 – Romero, Conwright	Donald L. Tucker Center (2,259); Tallahassee, FL
January 18; 2:00 p.m.	No. 20	at Virginia Tech	W 59–44	17–2 (4–1)	19 – Thomas	7 – Thomas, Brown, James	3 – Conwright, Jones, Brown	Cassell Coliseum (1,971); Blacksburg, VA
January 22; 7:00 p.m., ESPN3	No. 17	No. 4 Louisville	W 68–63	18–2 (5–1)	17 – Conwright	10 – Thomas	5 – Romero	Donald L. Tucker Center (2,847); Tallahassee, FL
January 25; 2:00 p.m., ESPN3	No. 17	Wake Forest	W 110–80	19–2 (6–1)	16 – Jones	10 – Bulgak	9 – Romero	Donald L. Tucker Center (2,779); Tallahassee, FL
January 30; 7:00 p.m., RSN	No. 9	at Georgia Tech	W 82–62	20–2 (7–1)	15 – Bingley	13 – Slaughter	8 – Romero	McCamish Pavilion (1,166); Atlanta, GA
February 2; 7:00 p.m., ESPN3	No. 9	No. 25 Syracuse	W 62–52	21–2 (8–1)	22 – Slaughter	16 – Bulgak	6 – Romero	Donald L. Tucker Center (2,758); Tallahassee, FL
February 8; 2:00 p.m., ESPN3	No. 9	Miami (FL)	W 80–60	22–2 (9–1)	19 – Bulgak	16 – Bulgak	5 – Romero	Donald L. Tucker Center (3,435); Tallahassee, FL
February 12; 7:00 p.m., RSN	No. 7	at No. 17 North Carolina	L 63–71	22–3 (9–2)	15 – Slaughter	13 – Bulgak	7 – Romero	Carmichael Arena (3,211); Chapel Hill, NC
February 15; 1:00 p.m.	No. 7	at Virginia	W 65–56	23–3 (10–2)	14 – Slaughter, Bulgak	9 – Bulgak	9 – Romero	John Paul Jones Arena (4,042); Charlottesville, VA
February 19; 7:00 p.m., ESPN3	No. 9	Clemson	W 81–38	24–3 (11–2)	13 – Slaughter	12 – Slaughter	4 – Richardson	Donald L. Tucker Center (2,819); Tallahassee, FL
February 22; 1:00 p.m.	No. 9	at Boston College	W 86–68	25–3 (12–2)	19 – Bulgak, Romero	11 – Romero	11 – Romero	Conte Forum (912); Chestnut Hill, MA
February 26; 7:00 p.m., ESPN3	No. 9	NC State	W 72–52	26–3 (13–2)	13 – Thomas	12 – Brown	7 – Richardson	Donald L. Tucker Center (4,048); Tallahassee, FL
March 1; 3:00 p.m., RSN	No. 9	at Miami (FL)	W 69–55	27–3 (14–2)	17 – Conwright	12 – Romero	6 – Romero	BankUnited Center (2,077); Coral Gables, FL
ACC Women's Tournament
March 6; 6:00 p.m., ACCN	(2) No. 7	vs. (14) Virginia Tech; Quarterfinals	W 82–43	28–3	17 – Thomas	7 – James	5 – Jones	Greensboro Coliseum (4,019); Greensboro, NC
March 7; 2:30 p.m., ESPNU	(2) No. 7 (2)	vs. (3) No. 10 (3) Louisville; Semifinals	W 66–51	29–3	17 – Slaughter	6 – Bulgak	6 – Romero	Greensboro Coliseum (7,108); Greensboro, NC
March 8; 1:00 p.m., ESPN	(2) No. 7	vs. (1) No. 2 Notre Dame; Championship	L 58–71	29–4	14 – Conwright	7 – Bulgak	6 – Conwright	Greensboro Coliseum (6,874); Greensboro, NC
NCAA Women's Tournament
March 21*; 1:45 p.m., ESPN2	(2 G) No. 7	(15 G) Alabama State; First round	W 91–49	30–4	17 – Thomas	8 – Romero	10 – Romero	Donald L. Tucker Center (5,536); Tallahassee, FL
March 23*; 6:00 p.m., ESPNU	(2 G) No. 7 (2)	(7 G) No. 20 Florida Gulf Coast; Second round	W 65–47	31–4	12 – Thomas	13 – Bulgak	6 – Romero	Donald L. Tucker Center (4,772); Tallahassee, FL
March 27*; 9:30 p.m., ESPN2	(2 G) No. 7	vs. (3 G) No. 9 (3) Arizona State; Sweet Sixteen	W 66–65	32–4	21 – Romero	7 – Bulgak	4 – Romero	Greensboro Coliseum (6,286); Greensboro, NC
March 29*; 12:00 p.m., ESPN	(2 G) No. 7	vs. (1 G) No. 3 South Carolina; Elite Eight	L 74–80	32–5	13 – Romero	7 – Slaughter, Romero	4 – Slaughter, Romero	Greensboro Coliseum (6,364); Greensboro, NC
*Non-conference game. ^{#}Rankings from AP Poll. (#) Tournament seedings in parentheses. All times are in Eastern Time.

== Awards ==
- ESPNW National Player of the Week
  - Adut Bulgak
- ESPNW Coach of the Year
  - Sue Semrau
- Associated Press National Coach of the Year
  - Sue Semrau
- WBCA Coach of the Year
  - Sue Semrau

=== Conference ===
- ACC Player of the Week
  - Adut Bulgak
- ACC Sixth Player of the Year
  - Shakayla Thomas
- ACC Coach of the Year
  - Sue Semrau

== Media ==
All Seminoles games will air on the Seminole IMG Sports Network. WQTL will be the new home of Seminoles women's basketball thanks to a new contract with Red Hills Broadcasting.
