= Big Muskego Lake =

Lake in Wisconsin, United States

Big Muskego lake
- Interactive map of Big Muskego lake
- Location: Waukesha County, Wisconsin
- Coordinates: 42.8765°N 88.1128°W
- Type: Glacial
- Basin countries: United States
- Surface area: 2,260 acres (914.6 ha)
- Average depth: 3 ft (0.91 m)
- Max. depth: 8 ft (2.4 m)

Big Muskego Lake is a shallow flow-through glacial lake in Muskego, Waukesha County, Wisconsin. It is located approximately 3 miles southeast of the smaller but deeper Little Muskego Lake. It is a popular site for birdwatching, hunting, and fishing, with noted populations of largemouth bass, panfish, and northern pike. The lake itself has a max depth of 8 feet and an average depth of 3 feet, while the connected embayment of Bass Bay has a max depth of 23 feet and an average depth of 12 feet.

== Geography ==
Big Muskego Lake covers approximately 2,260 acres, the vast majority of which is shallow water with a depth under 4 feet. A connected embayment, Bass Bay, is deeper, with an average depth of 12 feet, similar to other glacially formed "kettle" lakes in the region. The lake is the central component of the Big Muskego Lake Wildlife Area, maintained by the Wisconsin Department of Natural Resources in collaboration with local authorities.

== History ==
The Muskego area was first inhabited by the Potawatomi, with European settlers arriving around 1827. Native lands were ceded to the government within five years. Norwegian settlers were the predominant ethnic group in the area by 1839.

The lake was turbid and dominated by carp until the mid-1990s. Environmental restoration efforts drastically improved the lake's water and habitat quality between 1995 and 1997, and the Wisconsin Department of Natural Resources established the Big Muskego Lake Wildlife Area in 1999 to preserve the rehabilitative effects.

== Recreation ==
The lake has two designated boat launches. Popular activities in and near the lake include birdwatching, hunting, fishing, boating (primarily with canoes and kayaks due to shallow depth) and hiking. The lake has no designated hiking trail. It is considered a place of ornithological importance, making it a popular spot for birdwatching.

The Big Muskego Lake Wildlife Area is closed annually from 1 September to 31 December, except for licensed gun and muzzle-loading deer hunting.
