= 2014–15 Lipscomb Bisons women's basketball team =

Intercollegiate basketball season

2014–15 Lipscomb Bisons women's basketball
- Conference: Atlantic Sun Conference
- Record: 8–21 (3–11 A-Sun)
- Head coach: Greg Brown (3rd season)
- Assistant coaches: Courtney Locke (1st season); Anna Bowers (2nd season); Katherine Graham (1st season)
- Home arena: Allen Arena

2014–15 Atlantic Sun women's basketball standings
	Conf.				Overall
Team	W		L	PCT	W		L	PCT
No. 20 Florida Gulf Coast†	14	–	0	1.000	31	–	3	.912
Stetson	11	–	3	.786	23	–	8	.742
Northern Kentucky*	8	–	6	.571	19	–	14	.576
Kennesaw State	6	–	8	.429	17	–	13	.567
USC Upstate	6	–	8	.429	14	–	16	.467
Jacksonville	6	–	8	.429	12	–	17	.414
Lipscomb	3	–	11	.214	8	–	21	.276
North Florida	2	–	12	.143	11	–	19	.367
† 2015 Atlantic Sun Tournament winner As of March 23, 2015; Rankings from AP poll *Ineligible for postseason play due to Div. I transition

The 2014–15 Lipscomb Bisons women's basketball team represented Lipscomb University in the 2014–15 NCAA Division I women's basketball season. The Lady Bisons were coached by third year head coach Greg Brown and were a member of the Atlantic Sun Conference. They finished the season 8-21, 3-11 in A-Sun play for a seventh-place finish. They lost in the quarterfinals of the 2015 Atlantic Sun women's basketball tournament to Stetson.

== Media ==
All home games and conference road will be shown on ESPN3 or A-Sun.TV. Non conference road games will typically be available on the opponents website.

== Roster ==
2014–15 Lipscomb Lady Bisons women's basketball team
Players
Coaches

Pos.	#	Name	Height	Year	Previous school	Hometown
G	2	Kennedy Potts	5 ft 10 in (1.78 m)	Fr	Harpeth Hall School	Nashville, TN
G	3	Sara Bliss	5 ft 8 in (1.73 m)	Sr	Volunteer State CC	Pleasant View, TN
G	5	Chandler Cooper	5 ft 11 in (1.8 m)	RS So	Florida	Clarksville, TN
G	10	Danay Fothergill	5 ft 7 in (1.7 m)	RS Jr	Western Kentucky	Somerset, KY
G	11	Amber Fuqua	6 ft 0 in (1.83 m)	Fr	Sycamore	Nashville, TN
F	12	Ashley Southern	6 ft 1 in (1.85 m)	RS Jr	Chattanooga	Tuscumbia, AL
G	13	Emily Eubank	5 ft 9 in (1.75 m)	Fr	Oakland	Murfreesboro, TN
F	14	Kelsey Gregory	6 ft 0 in (1.83 m)	So	Macon County	Lafayette, TN
G	21	Kelli Smith	5 ft 5 in (1.65 m)	Jr	David Lipscomb	Nashville, TN
G	22	Loren Cagle	5 ft 5 in (1.65 m)	RS Fr	Lipscomb Academy	Nashville, TN
F	23	Faith LeGate	5 ft 11 in (1.8 m)	So	Christ Presbyterian Academy	Nashville, TN
F	24	Alex Gates	5 ft 11 in (1.8 m)	RS So	Beech	Hendersonville, TN
F	42	Riley Northway	6 ft 2 in (1.88 m)	Fr	Brewer	Somerville, AL

Head coach

- Greg Brown (Lipscomb)

Assistant coach(es)

- Courtney Locke (Rutgers)
- Anna Bowers (Lipscomb)
- Katherine Graham (LSU)

Legend

- (C) Team captain
- (S) Suspended
- (I) Ineligible
- (W) Walk-on
- Injured
- Current redshirt

Roster
Last update: 2014-07-16

== Schedule ==
Date time, TV	Rank^{#}	Opponent^{#}	Result	Record	Site (attendance) city, state
Exhibition
10/30/2014*; 6:30 pm		Freed–Hardeman	L 81–89	–	Allen Arena (N/A); Nashville, TN
11/07/2014*; 6:30 pm		Berea College	W 75–41	–	Allen Arena (N/A); Nashville, TN
Regular Season
11/14/2014*; 11:00 am		Georgia Southern	W 80–74	1–0	Allen Arena (765); Nashville, TN
11/16/2014*; 2:00 pm, ESPN3		Wright State	L 66–79	1–1	Allen Arena (560); Nashville, TN
11/19/2014*; 7:00 pm		at UAB	L 54–72	1–2	Bartow Arena (472); Birmingham, AL
11/22/2014*; 4:00 pm, ESPN3		Tennessee State	L 55–73	1–3	Allen Arena (327); Nashville, TN
11/25/2014*; 7:00 pm		at Murray State	L 71–74	1–4	CFSB Center (281); Murray, KY
11/29/2014*; 4:15 pm		at Morehead State	W 61–59	2–4	Ellis Johnson Arena (1,535); Morehead, KY
12/02/2014*; 5:00 pm		at Belmont	L 60–80	2–5	Curb Event Center (458); Nashville, TN
12/07/2014*; 2:00 pm, ESPN3		No. 14 Tennessee	L 51–85	2–6	Allen Arena (2,742); Nashville, TN
12/16/2014*; 6:30 pm		Jackson State	W 72–45	3–6	Allen Arena (228); Nashville, TN
12/18/2014*; 6:30 pm		Tennessee Tech	W 72–53	4–6	Allen Arena (312); Nashville, TN
12/20/2014*; 1:00 pm		at Xavier	L 38–62	4–7	Cintas Center (1,031); Cincinnati, OH
12/29/2014*; 3:00 pm		at Georgia Tech; Georgia Tech Holiday Tournament semifinals	L 53–71	4–8	Hank McCamish Pavilion (767); Atlanta, GA
12/30/2014*; 1:00 pm		vs. Harvard; Georgia Tech Holiday Tournament 3rd place game	L 63–81	4–9	Hank McCamish Pavilion (136); Atlanta, GA
01/05/2015*; 5:00 pm		Trevecca Nazarene	W 95–71	5–9	Allen Arena (N/A); Nashville, TN
01/10/2015; 4:00 pm, ESPN3		Northern Kentucky	L 70–81	5–10 (0–1)	Allen Arena (420); Nashville, TN
01/14/2015; 6:00 pm, ESPN3		at USC Upstate	L 68–71	5–11 (0–2)	G. B. Hodge Center (158); Spartanburg, SC
01/17/2015; 4:00 pm, ESPN3		Kennesaw State	W 79–61	6–11 (1–2)	Allen Arena (694); Nashville, TN
01/22/2015; 6:00 pm, ESPN3		at Jacksonville	W 75–63	7–11 (2–2)	Swisher Gymnasium (819); Jacksonville, FL
01/24/2015; 1:00 pm, ESPN3		at North Florida	W 71–62	8–11 (3–2)	UNF Arena (423); Jacksonville, FL
01/29/2015; 6:30 pm, ESPN3		Florida Gulf Coast	L 49–71	8–12 (3–3)	Allen Arena (N/A); Nashville, TN
01/31/2015; 4:00 pm, ESPN3		Stetson	L 77–82	8–13 (3–4)	Allen Arena (512); Nashville, TN
02/07/2015; 3:00 pm, ESPN3		at Northern Kentucky	L 57–64	8–14 (3–5)	The Bank of Kentucky Center (1,269); Highland Heights, KY
02/12/2015; 6:00 pm, ESPN3		at Stetson	L 75–103	8–15 (3–6)	Edmunds Center (465); DeLand, FL
02/14/2015; 6:05 pm, ESPN3		at Florida Gulf Coast	L 43–69	8–16 (3–7)	Alico Arena (1,762); Fort Myers, FL
02/19/2015; 6:30 pm, ESPN3		North Florida	L 54–57	8–17 (3–8)	Allen Arena (305); Nashville, TN
02/21/2015; 4:00 pm, ESPN3		Jacksonville	L 63–75	8–18 (3–9)	Allen Arena (322); Nashville, TN
02/25/2015; 6:30 pm, ESPN3		USC Upstate	L 67–76	8–19 (3–10)	Allen Arena (279); Nashville, TN
02/28/2015; 11:00 am, ESPN3		at Kennesaw State	L 57–75	8–20 (3–11)	KSU Convocation Center (826); Kennesaw, GA
2015 Atlantic Sun Tournament
03/06/2015; 7:00 pm, ESPN3		at Stetson; Quarterfinals	L 69–92	8–21	Edmunds Center (425); DeLand, FL
*Non-conference game. ^{#}Rankings from AP Poll. (#) Tournament seedings in parentheses. All times are in Eastern Time.
