= 2014–15 Northern Kentucky Norse women's basketball team =

Intercollegiate basketball season

2014–15 Northern Kentucky Norse women's basketball
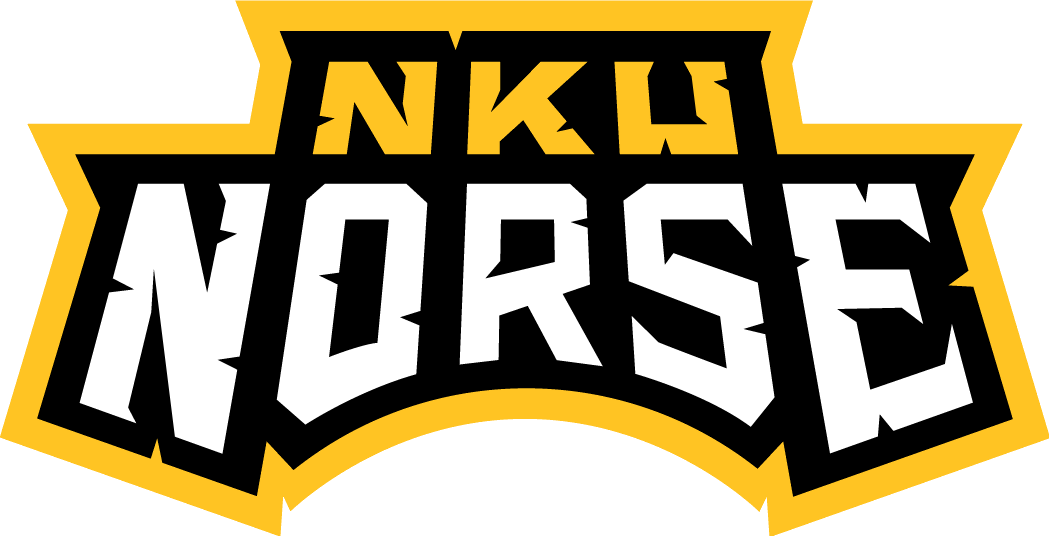

WBI, First Round
- Conference: Atlantic Sun Conference
- Record: 19–14 (8–6 A-Sun)
- Head coach: Dawn Plitzuweit (3rd season)
- Assistant coaches: Lynn Plett (3rd season); Karmen Graham (3rd season); Russ Rose (1st season)
- Home arena: The Bank of Kentucky Center

2014–15 Atlantic Sun women's basketball standings
	Conf.				Overall
Team	W		L	PCT	W		L	PCT
No. 20 Florida Gulf Coast†	14	–	0	1.000	31	–	3	.912
Stetson	11	–	3	.786	23	–	8	.742
Northern Kentucky*	8	–	6	.571	19	–	14	.576
Kennesaw State	6	–	8	.429	17	–	13	.567
USC Upstate	6	–	8	.429	14	–	16	.467
Jacksonville	6	–	8	.429	12	–	17	.414
Lipscomb	3	–	11	.214	8	–	21	.276
North Florida	2	–	12	.143	11	–	19	.367
† 2015 Atlantic Sun Tournament winner As of March 23, 2015; Rankings from AP poll *Ineligible for postseason play due to Div. I transition

The 2014–15 Northern Kentucky Norse women's basketball team represented Northern Kentucky University in the 2014–15 NCAA Division I women's basketball season. The Norse were coached by third year head coach Dawn Plitzuweit and were members of the Atlantic Sun Conference. They finished the season 19–14, 8–6 in A-Sun play to finish in third place This was the final year the Norse are ineligible to participate in the A-Sun tournament and cannot make the NCAA Tournament due to their transition from D2 to D1. However, they were eligible to compete in the 2015 Atlantic Sun women's basketball tournament, where they advanced to the championship game and lost to Florida Gulf Coast. They were invited to the Women's Basketball Invitational, where they lost in the first round to Marshall.

This was their final season in the Atlantic Sun before moving to the Horizon League.

== Media ==
All home games and conference road will be shown on ESPN3 or A-Sun.TV. Non conference road games will typically be available on the opponents website. Audio broadcasts of Norse games can be found on the NKU Portal with Andrew Kappes and Steve Moeller on the call.

== Roster ==
2014–15 Northern Kentucky Norse women's basketball team
Players
Coaches

Pos.	#	Name	Height	Year	Previous school	Hometown
G	0	Shar'Rae Davis (redshirt)	5 ft 8 in (1.73 m)	So	Grand Haven	Grand Haven, MI
F	1	Faith Sanders	5 ft 11 in (1.8 m)	Fr	Jenkins	Savannah, GA
G	3	Rebecca Lyttle (redshirt)	5 ft 7 in (1.7 m)	So	Hollywood Christian	Miramar, FL
F	4	Mikayla Terru	5 ft 11 in (1.8 m)	Fr	Lansing Christian	Lansing, MI
G	5	Rianna Gayheart	5 ft 7 in (1.7 m)	Jr	Owen County	Owenton, KY
G	10	Christine Roush	5 ft 11 in (1.8 m)	Jr	Mercy Academy	Louisville, KY
G	11	Malika Glover	5 ft 4 in (1.63 m)	RS Sr	East Lansing	East Lansing, MI
F	12	Courtney Roush	6 ft 0 in (1.83 m)	Jr	Mercy Academy	Louisville, KY
G	15	Sarah Kinch	5 ft 9 in (1.75 m)	So	Medina	Medina, OH
G	22	Kelley Wiegman	5 ft 10 in (1.78 m)	So	Mother of Mercy	Cincinnati, OH
F	23	Kasey Uetrecht	6 ft 1 in (1.85 m)	Fr	Clinton Massie	Clarksville, OH
F	31	Melody Doss	6 ft 0 in (1.83 m)	Sr	Center Grove	Greenwood, IN
C	32	Kaitlyn Gerrety	6 ft 1 in (1.85 m)	Sr	McAuley	Cincinnati, OH
F/C	44	Molly Franson	6 ft 2 in (1.88 m)	Fr	Victor J. Andrew	Tinley Park, IL

Head coach

- Dawn Plitzuweit (Michigan Tech)

Assistant coach(es)

- Lynn Plett (Tabor)
- Karmen Graham (Northern Kentucky)
- Tasha Washington (Davenport)

Legend

- (C) Team captain
- (S) Suspended
- (I) Ineligible
- (W) Walk-on
- Injured
- Current redshirt

Roster
Last update: 2014-07-17

== Schedule ==
Date time, TV	Rank^{#}	Opponent^{#}	Result	Record	Site (attendance) city, state
Regular Season
11/14/2014*; 3:30 pm		vs. Delaware State; Akron Classic	W 76–55	1–0	James A. Rhodes Arena (123); Akron, OH
11/15/2014*; 3:30 pm		at Akron; Akron Classic	L 49–82	1–1	James A. Rhodes Arena (668); Akron, OH
11/19/2014*; 8:05 pm		at Illinois State	W 59–48	2–1	Redbird Arena (860); Normal, IL
11/22/2014*; 4:00 pm, ESPN3		Loyola–Chicago	L 38–45	2–2	The Bank of Kentucky Center (784); Highland Heights, KY
11/25/2014*; 7:00 pm, ESPN3		Ohio	L 38–77	2–3	The Bank of Kentucky Center (1,191); Highland Heights, KY
11/28/2014*; 6:00 pm		vs. Grand Canyon; Navy Classic	W 52–45	3–3	Alumni Hall (509); Annapolis, MD
11/29/2014*; 6:00 pm		vs. UNC Greensboro; Navy Classic	W 66–58	4–3	Alumni Hall (868); Annapolis, MD
12/03/2014*; 7:00 pm		at No. 13 Kentucky	L 64–82	4–4	Memorial Coliseum (4,615); Lexington, KY
12/06/2014*; 4:30 pm		at IPFW	L 59–65	4–5	Hilliard Gates Sports Center (1,147); Fort Wayne, IN
12/15/2014*; 8:00 pm		at Marquette	W 77–68	5–5	Al McGuire Center (757); Milwaukee, WI
12/17/2014*; 7:00 pm, ESPN3		Cincinnati	W 66–52	6–5	The Bank of Kentucky Center (1,253); Highland Heights, KY
12/19/2014*; 7:00 pm		vs. Delaware	W 63–58	7–5	Fifth Third Arena (164); Cincinnati, OH
12/30/2014*; 7:00 pm, ESPN3		IUPUI	W 57–43	8–5	The Bank of Kentucky Center (1,283); Highland Heights, KY
01/03/2015*; 1:00 pm, ESPN3		Wright State	L 60–72	8–6	The Bank of Kentucky Center (1,014); Highland Heights, KY
01/06/2015*; 7:00 pm, ESPN3		Georgetown (KY)	W 78–54	9–6	The Bank of Kentucky Center (1,088); Highland Heights, KY
01/10/2015; 5:00 pm, ESPN3		at Lipscomb	W 81–70	10–6 (1–0)	Allen Arena (420); Nashville, TN
01/14/2015; 7:00 pm, ESPN3		at Kennesaw State	L 58–66	10–7 (1–1)	KSU Convocation Center (605); Kennesaw, GA
01/17/2015; 7:00 pm, ESPN3		USC Upstate	W 77–74	11–7 (2–1)	The Bank of Kentucky Center (1,163); Highland Heights, KY
01/22/2015; 7:00 pm, ESPN3		at North Florida	L 79–81 ^{2OT}	11–8 (2–2)	UNF Arena (388); Jacksonville, FL
01/24/2015; 2:00 pm		at Jacksonville	W 70–59	12–8 (3–2)	Swisher Gymnasium (744); Jacksonville, FL
01/29/2015; 7:00 pm, ESPN3		Stetson	W 68–62	13–8 (4–2)	The Bank of Kentucky Center (1,130); Highland Heights, KY
01/31/2015; 7:00 pm, ESPN3		Florida Gulf Coast	L 46–67	13–9 (4–3)	The Bank of Kentucky Center (1,684); Highland Heights, KY
02/07/2015; 4:00 pm, ESPN3		Lipscomb	W 64–57	14–9 (5–3)	The Bank of Kentucky Center (1,269); Highland Heights, KY
02/12/2015; 7:00 pm, ESPN3		at Florida Gulf Coast	L 47–75	14–10 (5–4)	Alico Arena (2,633); Fort Myers, FL
02/14/2015; 1:00 pm, ESPN3		at Stetson	L 75–93	14–11 (5–5)	Edmunds Center (591); DeLand, FL
02/19/2015; 7:00 pm, ESPN3		Jacksonville	L 62–76	14–12 (5–6)	The Bank of Kentucky Center (1,180); Highland Heights, KY
02/21/2015; 7:00 pm, ESPN3		North Florida	W 67–29	15–12 (6–6)	Regents Hall (643); Highland Heights, KY
02/25/2015; 7:00 pm, ESPN3		Kennesaw State	W 68–61	16–12 (7–6)	The Bank of Kentucky Center (1,165); Highland Heights, KY
02/28/2015; 2:00 pm, ESPN3		at USC Upstate	W 83–60	17–12 (8–6)	G. B. Hodge Center (325); Spartanburg, SC
Atlantic Sun tournament
03/06/2015; 7:00 pm, ESPN3		USC Upstate; Quarterfinals	W 64–45	18–12	Regents Hall (475); Highland Heights, KY
03/11/2015; 7:00 pm, ESPN3		at Stetson; Semifinals	W 53–52	19–12	Edumonds Center (487); DeLand, FL
03/15/2015; 2:30 pm, ESPN3		at No. 20 Florida Gulf Coast; Championship	L 43–60	19–13	Alico Arena (3,011); Fort Myers, FL
WBI
03/19/2015*; 7:00 pm, ESPN3		Marshall; First Round	L 79–81	19–14	The Bank of Kentucky Center (486); Highland Heights, KY
*Non-conference game. ^{#}Rankings from AP Poll. (#) Tournament seedings in parentheses. All times are in Eastern Time.

== See also ==
- 2014–15 Northern Kentucky Norse men's basketball team
