= 2014–15 Stetson Hatters women's basketball team =

Intercollegiate basketball season

2014–15 Stetson Hatters women's basketball
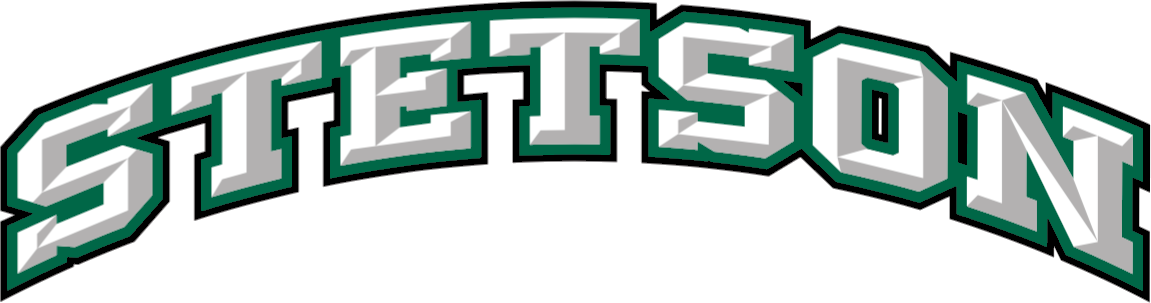

Hatter Classic Champions

WNIT, First Round
- Conference: Atlantic Sun Conference
- Record: 23–8 (11–3 A-Sun)
- Head coach: Lynn Bria (7th season)
- Assistant coaches: Pam Brown (3rd season); David Saur (2nd season); Daniel Barber (1st season)
- Home arena: Edmunds Center

2014–15 Atlantic Sun women's basketball standings
	Conf.				Overall
Team	W		L	PCT	W		L	PCT
No. 20 Florida Gulf Coast†	14	–	0	1.000	31	–	3	.912
Stetson	11	–	3	.786	23	–	8	.742
Northern Kentucky*	8	–	6	.571	19	–	14	.576
Kennesaw State	6	–	8	.429	17	–	13	.567
USC Upstate	6	–	8	.429	14	–	16	.467
Jacksonville	6	–	8	.429	12	–	17	.414
Lipscomb	3	–	11	.214	8	–	21	.276
North Florida	2	–	12	.143	11	–	19	.367
† 2015 Atlantic Sun Tournament winner As of March 23, 2015; Rankings from AP poll *Ineligible for postseason play due to Div. I transition

The 2014–15 Stetson Hatters women's basketball team represented Stetson University in the 2014–15 NCAA Division I women's basketball season. The Hatters were coached by seventh year head coach Lynn Bria and were members of the Atlantic Sun Conference. They finished the season 23-8, 11-3 in A-Sun play for a second-place finish. They advance to the semifinals of the 2015 Atlantic Sun women's basketball tournament, where they lost to Northern Kentucky. They were invited to the 2015 Women's National Invitation Tournament, where they lost to Richmond in the first round.

== Media ==
All home games and conference road will be shown on ESPN3 or A-Sun.TV. Non conference road games will typically be available on the opponents website. Audio broadcasts of Hatters games can be found on WSBB AM 1230/1490 with Ryan Rouse on the call.

== Roster ==
2014–15 Stetson Hatters women's basketball team
Players
Coaches
f

Pos.	#	Name	Height	Year	Previous school	Hometown
G	1	C.J. Coddington	5 ft 10 in (1.78 m)	Sr	Nova	Davie, FL
F	3	Cherisse Burris	5 ft 10 in (1.78 m)	Sr	Blue Springs	Blue Springs, MO
F/C	4	Amber Porter	6 ft 4 in (1.93 m)	So	Potomac	Woodbridge, VA
G	10	Brianti Saunders	5 ft 4 in (1.63 m)	So	Hilliard Middle-Senior	Hilliard, FL
G	12	Myeisha Hall	5 ft 8 in (1.73 m)	Sr	Palm Beach Lakes	West Palm Beach, FL
G	15	DeAsia Beals	5 ft 9 in (1.75 m)	So	Holy Cross	Covington KY
G/F	21	Sarah Sagerer	6 ft 3 in (1.91 m)	Fr	The Rock School	Vöcklabruck, Austria
G	22	Jama Sharp	5 ft 7 in (1.7 m)	Sr	Mooresville	Mooresville, IN
G/F	24	Lashai Geeter	5 ft 11 in (1.8 m)	Fr	King Senior	River Rouge, MI
G	25	Aisha Turner	5 ft 7 in (1.7 m)	RS So	Westlake	College Park, GA
G/F	33	Keevana Edwards	5 ft 11 in (1.8 m)	Fr	Wesleyan	Atlanta, GA
G/F	11	Alexandra Ciabattoni (redshirt)	6 ft 0 in (1.83 m)	Jr	Newman	Adelaide, South Australia
F	32	Jo Paine (redshirt)	6 ft 0 in (1.83 m)	So	Santa Clara	Oregon City, OR

Head coach

- Lynn Bria (Charleston (WV))

Assistant coach(es)

- Pam Brown (Charlotte)
- David Saur (Thiel)
- Daniel Barber (Florida)

Legend

- (C) Team captain
- (S) Suspended
- (I) Ineligible
- (W) Walk-on
- Injured
- Current redshirt

Roster
Last update: 2014-10-15

== Schedule ==
Date time, TV	Rank^{#}	Opponent^{#}	Result	Record	Site (attendance) city, state
Exhibition
11/09/2014; 10:00 am		Warner	W 87–47	–	Edmunds Center (265); DeLand, FL
Regular Season
11/14/2014*; 5:30 pm, ESPN3		Bethune-Cookman	W 91–61	1–0	Edmunds Center (430); DeLand, FL
11/19/2014*; 7:00 pm		at UCF	W 67–49	2–0	CFE Arena (1,137); Orlando, FL
11/22/2014*; 2:30 pm		at Indiana State	W 62–52	3–0	Hulman Center (2,215); Terre Haute, IN
11/28/2014*; 6:00 pm		vs. Marist; BTI Classic	W 57–50	4–0	Ferrell Center (N/A); Waco, TX
11/29/2014*; 1:00 pm		at No. 13 Baylor; BTI Classic	L 42–96	4–1	Ferrell Center (5,458); Waco, TX
11/30/2014*; 1:00 pm		vs. Utah State; BTI Classic	W 84–64	5–1	Ferrell Center (N/A); Waco, TX
12/03/2014*; 7:00 pm		at South Florida	L 62–78	5–2	USF Sun Dome (1,475); Tampa, FL
12/05/2014*; 11:00 am, ESPN3		Webber International	W 90–27	6–2	Edmunds Center (2,460); DeLand, FL
12/06/2014*; 12:00 pm, ESPN3		Warner	W 101–40	7–2	Edmunds Center (246); DeLand, FL
12/14/2014*; 1:00 pm		at Florida	L 54–59	7–3	O'Connell Center (1,309); Gainesville, FL
12/19/2014*; 1:00 pm, ESPN3		Campbell; Hatter Classic semifinals	W 76–63	8–3	Edmunds Center (275); DeLand, FL
12/20/2014*; 1:00 pm, ESPN3		Texas State; Hatter Classic championship	W 75–57	9–3	Edmunds Center (258); DeLand, FL
12/31/2014*; 1:00 pm, ESPN3		UNC Wilmington	W 72–55	10–3	Edmunds Center (487); DeLand, FL
01/03/2015*; 2:35 pm, ESPN3		at Valparaiso	W 73–62	11–3	Athletics–Recreation Center (413); Valparaiso, IN
01/10/2015; 4:00 pm, ESPN3		at Florida Gulf Coast	L 55–57	11–4 (0–1)	Alico Arena (3,253); Fort Myers, FL
01/14/2015; 7:00 pm, ESPN3		Jacksonville	W 73–47	12–4 (1–1)	Edmunds Center (510); DeLand, FL
01/17/2015; 2:00 pm, ESPN3		at North Florida	W 67–38	13–4 (2–1)	UNF Arena (484); Jacksonville, FL
01/22/2015; 7:00 pm, ESPN3		Kennesaw State	W 75–64	14–4 (3–1)	Edmunds Center (465); DeLand, FL
01/24/2015; 1:00 pm, ESPN3		USC Upstate	W 67–44	15–4 (4–1)	Edmunds Center (415); DeLand, FL
01/29/2015; 7:00 pm, ESPN3		at Northern Kentucky	L 62–68	15–5 (4–2)	The Bank of Kentucky Center (1,130); Highland Heights, KY
01/31/2015; 5:00 pm, ESPN3		at Lipscomb	W 82–77	16–5 (5–2)	Allen Arena (512); Nashville, TN
02/07/2015; 1:00 pm, ESPN3		Florida Gulf Coast	L 39–61	16–6 (5–3)	Edmunds Center (2,015); DeLand, FL
02/12/2015; 7:00 pm, ESPN3		Lipscomb	W 103–75	17–6 (6–3)	Edmunds Center (465); DeLand, FL
02/14/2015; 1:00 pm, ESPN3		Northern Kentucky	W 93–75	18–6 (7–3)	Edmunds Center (591); DeLand, FL
02/19/2015; 7:00 pm, ESPN3		at USC Upstate	W 92–66	19–6 (8–3)	G. B. Hodge Center (235); Spartanburg, SC
02/21/2015; 7:00 pm, ESPN3		at Kennesaw State	W 70–58	20–6 (9–3)	KSU Convocation Center (803); Kennesaw, GA
02/25/2015; 7:00 pm, ESPN3		at Jacksonville	W 73–67	21–6 (10–3)	Swisher Gymnasium (311); Jacksonville, FL
02/28/2015; 2:00 pm, ESPN3		North Florida	W 77–45	22–6 (11–3)	Edmunds Center (510); DeLand, FL
2015 Atlantic Sun Tournament
03/06/2015; 7:00 pm, ESPN3		Lipscomb; Quarterfinals	W 92–69	23–6	Edmunds Center (425); DeLand, FL
03/11/2015; 7:00 pm, ESPN3		Northern Kentucky; Semifinals	L 52–53	23–7	Edmunds Center (487); DeLand, FL
WNIT
03/20/2015*; 7:00 pm, ESPN3		Richmond; First Round	L 66–67	23–8	Edmunds Center (434); DeLand, FL
*Non-conference game. ^{#}Rankings from AP Poll. (#) Tournament seedings in parentheses. All times are in Eastern Time.

== See also ==
- 2014–15 Stetson Hatters men's basketball team
