= 2014–15 North Florida Ospreys women's basketball team =

Intercollegiate basketball season

2014–15 North Florida Ospreys women's basketball
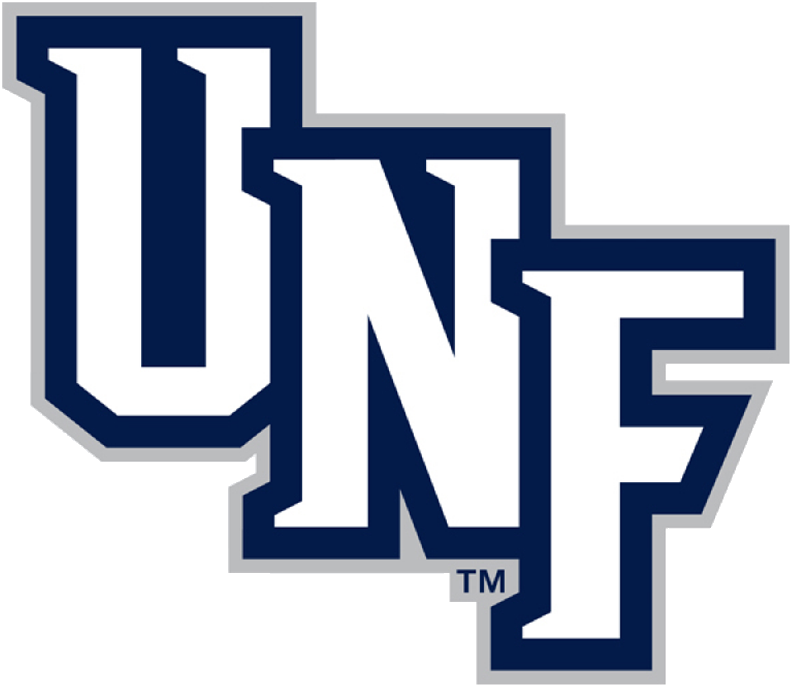
- Conference: Atlantic Sun Conference
- Record: 11–19 (2–12 A-Sun)
- Head coach: Mary Tappmeyer (23rd season)
- Assistant coach: Nancy Miller (17th year); Keunta Miles (8th year); Tasha Washington (1st year)
- Home arena: UNF Arena

2014–15 Atlantic Sun women's basketball standings
	Conf.				Overall
Team	W		L	PCT	W		L	PCT
No. 20 Florida Gulf Coast†	14	–	0	1.000	31	–	3	.912
Stetson	11	–	3	.786	23	–	8	.742
Northern Kentucky*	8	–	6	.571	19	–	14	.576
Kennesaw State	6	–	8	.429	17	–	13	.567
USC Upstate	6	–	8	.429	14	–	16	.467
Jacksonville	6	–	8	.429	12	–	17	.414
Lipscomb	3	–	11	.214	8	–	21	.276
North Florida	2	–	12	.143	11	–	19	.367
† 2015 Atlantic Sun Tournament winner As of March 23, 2015; Rankings from AP poll *Ineligible for postseason play due to Div. I transition

The 2014–15 North Florida Ospreys women's basketball team represented the University of North Florida in the 2014–15 NCAA Division I women's basketball season. The Ospreys were coached by 23rd-year head coach Mary Tappmeyer and were members of the Atlantic Sun Conference (A-Sun). Their home games were played at UNF Arena in Jacksonville, Florida. They finished the season 11–19, 2–12 in A-Sun play, for a last-place finish. They were defeated in the quarterfinals of the 2015 Atlantic Sun women's basketball tournament to Florida Gulf Coast.

== Media ==
All the team's home games and conference road games were shown on ESPN3 or A-Sun.TV.

== Roster ==
2014–15 North Florida Ospreys women's basketball team
Players
Coaches

Pos.	#	Name	Height	Year	Previous school	Hometown
G	1	Brittney Wright	5 ft 7 in (1.7 m)	Sr	Florida State College at Jacksonville	Altamonte Springs, FL
G	2	Sierra Shepherd	5 ft 4 in (1.63 m)	Fr	Ribault	Jacksonville, FL
G	3	Bailey Florin	5 ft 7 in (1.7 m)	So	Boone	Orlando, FL
G	4	Flo Ward	5 ft 8 in (1.73 m)	So	Totton College	Salisbury, England
G	5	Destinee Smith	5 ft 8 in (1.73 m)	Sr	Columbia	Decatur, GA
G/F	11	Taru Madekivi	5 ft 11 in (1.8 m)	So	Aurajoki	Turku, Finland
F/C	12	Paulina Zaveckaitė	6 ft 1 in (1.85 m)	Sr	The Rock	Telšiai, Lithuania
F/C	15	Lindsey Levings	6 ft 3 in (1.91 m)	Fr	Georgia Christian	Fargo, GA
F/C	22	Janea Williams	6 ft 3 in (1.91 m)	RS So	Pinecrest	Pinehurst, NC
G	23	Kadesia Johnson	5 ft 8 in (1.73 m)	Jr	Poinciana	Alpharetta, GA
G/F	24	Maiya Rumph	5 ft 10 in (1.78 m)	Fr	Sparkman	Madison, AL
G/F	33	Amber Robinson	5 ft 10 in (1.78 m)	So	Lake Brantley	Altamonte Springs, FL
G/F	34	Caitlyn Spane	5 ft 10 in (1.78 m)	Jr	Terry	Jackson, MS
C	42	Tori Pharr	6 ft 2 in (1.88 m)	Fr	Newton	Covington, GA

Head coach

- Mary Tappmeyer (SUNY Cortland)

Assistant coach(es)

- Nancy Miller (North Florida)
- Keunta Miles (Central Florida)
- Tasha Washington (Armstrong Atlantic State)

Legend

- (C) Team captain
- (S) Suspended
- (I) Ineligible
- (W) Walk-on
- Injured
- Current redshirt

Roster
Last update: February 19, 2025

== Schedule ==
Date time, TV	Rank^{#}	Opponent^{#}	Result	Record	Site (attendance) city, state
Regular season
November 15, 2014*; 7:00 p.m.		Georgia State	L 59–72	0–1	UNF Arena (553); Jacksonville, FL
November 18, 2014*; 11:00 a.m.		Edward Waters	W 62–57	1–1	UNF Arena (2,377); Jacksonville, FL
November 21, 2014*; 8:00 p.m.		at Miami (FL)	L 53–81	1–2	BankUnited Center (674); Coral Gables, FL
November 24, 2014*; 7:00 p.m.		at Samford	L 47–81	1–3	Pete Hanna Center (398); Birmingham, AL
November 28, 2014*; 2:00 p.m.		at UNC Wilmington; UNCW Hampton Inn Thanksgiving Classic	W 55–41	2–3	Trask Coliseum (712); Wilmington, NC
November 29, 2014*; 12:00 p.m.		vs. Eastern Kentucky; UNCW Hampton Inn Thanksgiving Classic	W 62–45	3–3	Trask Coliseum (N/A); Wilmington, NC
December 2, 2014*; 4:30 p.m.		at UCF	L 56–60	3–4	CFE Arena (1,247); Orlando, FL
December 6, 2014*; 7:30 p.m.		at Tennessee State	W 54–53	4–4	Gentry Complex (378); Nashville, TN
December 13, 2014*; 2:00 p.m.		Thomas	W 54–39	5–4	UNF Arena (322); Jacksonville, FL
December 16, 2014*; 7:00 p.m., ESPN3		at Florida State	L 58–79	5–5	Donald L. Tucker Center (2,229); Tallahassee, FL
December 20, 2014*; 3:30 p.m.		Wofford; Oceanfront Holiday Classic	W 68–60	6–5	UNF Arena (474); Jacksonville, FL
December 21, 2014*; 3:30 p.m.		Western Carolina; Oceanfront Holiday Classic	W 62–45	7–5	UNF Arena (689); Jacksonville, FL
December 28, 2014*; 2:00 p.m.		at Florida	L 51–63	7–6	O'Connell Center (1,413); Gainesville, FL
January 1, 2015*; 2:00 p.m.		Mercer	W 57–55	8–6	UNF Arena (342); Jacksonville, FL
January 6, 2015*; 4:30 p.m.		UMKC	W 63–62 ^{OT}	9–6	UNF Arena (1,715); Jacksonville, FL
January 10, 2015; 1:00 p.m., ESPN3		at Jacksonville	L 52–54	9–7 (0–1)	Veterans Memorial Arena (677); Jacksonville, FL
January 14, 2015; 7:05 p.m., ESPN3		at Florida Gulf Coast	L 42–75	9–8 (0–2)	Alico Arena (1,504); Fort Myers, FL
January 17, 2015; 2:00 p.m., ESPN3		Stetson	L 38–67	9–9 (0–3)	UNF Arena (484); Jacksonville, FL
January 22, 2015; 7:00 p.m., ESPN3		Northern Kentucky	W 81–79 ^{2OT}	10–9 (1–3)	UNF Arena (388); Jacksonville, FL
January 24, 2015; 2:00 p.m., ESPN3		Lipscomb	L 62–71	10–10 (1–4)	UNF Arena (423); Jacksonville, FL
January 29, 2015; 7:00 p.m., ESPN3		at Kennesaw State	L 40–46	10–11 (1–5)	KSU Convocation Center (425); Kennesaw, GA
January 31, 2015; 2:00 p.m., ESPN3		at USC Upstate	L 49–61	10–12 (1–6)	G. B. Hodge Center (278); Spartanburg, SC
February 7, 2015; 2:00 p.m., ESPN3		Jacksonville	L 56–68	10–13 (1–7)	UNF Arena (524); Jacksonville, FL
February 12, 2015; 7:00 p.m., ESPN3		USC Upstate	L 50–59	10–14 (1–8)	UNF Arena (356); Jacksonville, FL
February 14, 2015; 2:00 p.m., ESPN3		Kennesaw State	L 52–64	10–15 (1–9)	UNF Arena (388); Jacksonville, FL
February 19, 2015; 7:30 p.m., ESPN3		at Lipscomb	W 57–54	11–15 (2–9)	Allen Arena (305); Nashville, TN
February 21, 2015; 7:00 p.m.		at Northern Kentucky	L 29–67	11–16 (2–10)	Regents Hall (643); Highland Heights, KY
February 25, 2015; 7:00 p.m., ESPN3		No. 21 Florida Gulf Coast	L 24–56	11–17 (2–11)	UNF Arena (386); Jacksonville, FL
February 28, 2015; 1:00 p.m., ESPN3		at Stetson	L 45–77	11–18 (2–12)	Edmunds Center (510); DeLand, FL
Atlantic Sun tournament
March 6, 2015; 7:00 p.m., ESPN3		at No. 20 Florida Gulf Coast; Quarterfinals	L 35–74	11–19	Alico Arena (1,806); Fort Myers, FL
*Non-conference game. ^{#}Rankings from AP poll. (#) Tournament seedings in parentheses. All times are in Eastern.

== See also ==
- 2014–15 North Florida Ospreys men's basketball team
