= Lake Denoon =

Lake in Wisconsin, United States

- Location within Wisconsin Location within the United States
- Location: Muskego, Wisconsin, United States
- Coordinates: 42.84657°N 88.16887°W
- Surface area: 167 acres (68 ha)
- Average depth: 18 ft (5.5 m)
- Max. depth: 55 ft (17 m)

Lake Denoon is the smallest of three lakes located in Muskego, Wisconsin. It has a surface area of approximately 167 acres (68 ha) and mean depth of 18 feet (5.5 m), with a maximum depth of 55 feet (17 m).
