= 2014–15 USC Upstate Spartans women's basketball team =

Intercollegiate basketball season

2014–15 USC Upstate Spartans women's basketball
- Conference: Atlantic Sun Conference
- Record: 14–16 (6–8 A-Sun)
- Head coach: Tammy George (10th season)
- Assistant coaches: Ayana McWilliams (4th season); Jason Rasnake (2nd season); Bill Tender (11th season)
- Home arena: G. B. Hodge Center

2014–15 Atlantic Sun women's basketball standings
	Conf.				Overall
Team	W		L	PCT	W		L	PCT
No. 20 Florida Gulf Coast†	14	–	0	1.000	31	–	3	.912
Stetson	11	–	3	.786	23	–	8	.742
Northern Kentucky*	8	–	6	.571	19	–	14	.576
Kennesaw State	6	–	8	.429	17	–	13	.567
USC Upstate	6	–	8	.429	14	–	16	.467
Jacksonville	6	–	8	.429	12	–	17	.414
Lipscomb	3	–	11	.214	8	–	21	.276
North Florida	2	–	12	.143	11	–	19	.367
† 2015 Atlantic Sun Tournament winner As of March 23, 2015; Rankings from AP poll *Ineligible for postseason play due to Div. I transition

The 2014–15 USC Upstate Spartans women's basketball team represented the University of South Carolina Upstate in the 2014–15 NCAA Division I women's basketball season. The Spartans were coached by tenth year head coach Tammy George and were members of the Atlantic Sun Conference. They finished the season 14-16, 7-9 in A-Sun play for a three way tie for a fourth-place finish. They lost in the quarterfinals of the 2015 Atlantic Sun women's basketball tournament to Northern Kentucky.

== Media ==
All home games and conference road will be shown on ESPN3 or A-Sun.TV. Non conference road games will typically be available on the opponents website.

== Roster ==
2014–15 USC Upstate Spartans women's basketball team
Players
Coaches

Pos.	#	Name	Height	Year	Previous school	Hometown
G	0	Lauren Bogle	5 ft 9 in (1.75 m)	Sr	Lake Land College	Brocton, IL
G	3	Travonda Haddock	5 ft 9 in (1.75 m)	Jr	Jones Senior	Pollocksville, NC
G	5	Briana McCrimmon	5 ft 6 in (1.68 m)	Fr	Athens Drive	Cary, NC
G	11	Brittany Clency	5 ft 7 in (1.7 m)	Jr	Western Guilford	Greensboro, NC
G	13	Raven Jefferson	5 ft 9 in (1.75 m)	So	Liberty Christian Academy	Lynchburg, VA
F	14	Elesha Foster	6 ft 0 in (1.83 m)	Fr	Cook County	Sparks, GA
C	15	Coco Ritter	6 ft 2 in (1.88 m)	Fr	Orangeburg-Wilkerson	Orangeburg, SC
G	20	Mar'Lisa Braxton	5 ft 8 in (1.73 m)	Jr	Grambling	Detroit, MI
G	21	Kristen Dickerson	5 ft 7 in (1.7 m)	Jr	Pensacloa State College	Montgomery, AL
G	22	Alex Stanford	5 ft 5 in (1.65 m)	RS Jr	Kaskaskia College	Country Club Hills, IL
G	23	Sharmayne Edwards	5 ft 7 in (1.7 m)	Sr	Florida State College	Lake City, FL
C	24	A'Lexxus Davis	6 ft 1 in (1.85 m)	Fr	Potter's House Christian Academy	Jacksonville, FL
G	31	Maddie Herr	5 ft 9 in (1.75 m)	Sr	Hamilton Heights	Arcadia, IL
F	32	Shelby Hicks	6 ft 0 in (1.83 m)	Sr	South Greene	Greeneville, TN
C	34	Brittany Starling	6 ft 0 in (1.83 m)	Jr	Sumter	Sumter, SC

Head coach

- Tammy George (Charlotte)

Assistant coach(es)

- Ayana McWilliams (Brevard)
- Jason Rasnake (NC State)
- Bill Tender (Wofford)

Legend

- (C) Team captain
- (S) Suspended
- (I) Ineligible
- (W) Walk-on
- Injured
- Current redshirt

Roster
Last update: 2014-07-18

== Schedule ==
Date time, TV	Rank^{#}	Opponent^{#}	Result	Record	Site (attendance) city, state
Regular Season
11/14/2014*; 7:00 pm		at No. 19 Iowa	L 56–107	0–1	Carver–Hawkeye Arena (5,291); Iowa City, IA
11/16/2014*; 1:30 pm		at Iowa State	L 76–98	0–2	Hilton Coliseum (9,656); Ames, IA
11/18/2014*; 7:00 pm		Converse	W 78–50	1–2	G. B. Hodge Center (464); Spartanburg, SC
11/20/2014*; 7:00 pm		at UNC Greensboro	W 69–60	2–2	Fleming Gymnasium (305); Greensboro, NC
11/23/2014*; 3:00 pm, ESPN3		IPFW	W 85–73	3–2	G. B. Hodge Center (312); Spartanburg, SC
11/25/2014*; 6:00 pm		at South Carolina State	L 50–60	3–3	SHM Memorial Center (128); Orangeburg, SC
11/30/2014*; 3:00 pm		Brevard	W 72–44	4–3	G. B. Hodge Center (212); Spartanburg, SC
12/02/2014*; 7:00 pm		at Alabama	L 65–74	4–4	Foster Auditorium (2,243); Tuscaloosa, AL
12/06/2014*; 4:00 pm		at Western Carolina	L 59–63 ^{OT}	4–5	Ramsey Center (426); Cullowhee, NC
12/13/2014*; 2:00 pm, ESPN3		Maryland Eastern Hawks	W 60–38	5–5	G. B. Hodge Center (122); Spartanburg, SC
12/17/2014*; 7:00 pm, ESPN3		Morehead State	W 75–69	6–5	G. B. Hodge Center (133); Spartanburg, SC
12/21/2014*; 3:00 pm, ESPN3		UNC Asheville	W 67–60	7–5	G. B. Hodge Center (233); Spartanburg, SC
12/30/2014*; 7:00 pm		at College of Charleston	L 60–61	7–6	TD Arena (381); Charleston, SC
01/03/2015*; 1:00 pm, ESPN3		Norfolk State	W 70–58	8–6	G. B. Hodge Center (388); Spartanburg, SC
01/07/2015*; 7:00 pm		at Furman	L 59–74	8–7	Timmons Arena (396); Greenville, SC
01/10/2015; 4:30 pm, ESPN3		Kennesaw State	L 63–72	8–8 (0–1)	G. B. Hodge Center (388); Spartanburg, SC
01/14/2015; 7:00 pm, ESPN3		Lipscomb	W 71–68	9–8 (1–1)	G. B. Hodge Center (158); Spartanburg, SC
01/17/2015; 7:00 pm, ESPN3		at Northern Kentucky	L 74–77	9–9 (1–2)	The Bank of Kentucky Center (1,163); Highland Heights, KY
01/22/2015; 7:00 pm, ESPN3		at Florida Gulf Coast	L 61–79	9–10 (1–3)	Alico Arena (1,426); Fort Myers, FL
01/24/2015; 1:00 pm, ESPN3		at Stetson	L 44–67	9–11 (1–4)	Edmunds Center (415); DeLand, FL
01/29/2015; 7:00 pm, ESPN3		Jacksonville	W 66–64	10–11 (2–4)	G. B. Hodge Center (302); Spartanburg, SC
01/31/2015; 2:00 pm, ESPN3		North Florida	W 61–49	11–11 (3–4)	G. B. Hodge Center (278); Spartanburg, SC
02/07/2015; 12:00 pm, ESPN3		at Kennesaw State	L 55–67	11–12 (3–5)	KSU Convocation Center (435); Kennesaw, GA
02/12/2015; 7:00 pm, ESPN3		at North Florida	W 59–50	12–12 (4–5)	UNF Arena (356); Jacksonville, FL
02/14/2015; 2:00 pm		at Jacksonville	W 60–58	13–12 (5–5)	Swisher Gymnasium (N/A); Jacksonville, FL
02/19/2015; 7:00 pm, ESPN3		Stetson	L 66–92	13–13 (5–6)	G. B. Hodge Center (235); Spartanburg, SC
02/21/2015; 2:00 pm, ESPN3		No. 22 Florida Gulf Coast	L 59–75	13–14 (5–7)	G. B. Hodge Center (275); Spartanburg, SC
02/25/2015; 7:30 pm, ESPN3		at Lipscomb	W 76–67	14–14 (6–7)	Allen Arena (279); Nashville, TN
02/28/2015; 2:00 pm, ESPN3		Northern Kentucky	L 60–83	14–15 (6–8)	G. B. Hodge Center (325); Spartanburg, SC
2015 Atlantic Sun Tournament
03/06/2015; 7:00 pm, ESPN3		at Northern Kentucky; Quarterfinals	L 45–64	14–16	Regents Hall (475); Highland Heights, KY
*Non-conference game. ^{#}Rankings from AP Poll. (#) Tournament seedings in parentheses. All times are in Eastern Time.

== See also ==
- 2014–15 USC Upstate Spartans men's basketball team
