= Muskego High School =

Location
- W185S8750 Racine Ave; Muskego, Waukesha, Wisconsin, 53150; United States
- Coordinates: 42.885218°N 88.144508°W

Information
- Type: Public school
- Opened: 1956
- School district: Muskego-Norway School District
- Superintendent: Todd Irvine
- Principal: Andrew Bavlnka
- Teaching staff: 95.38 (FTE)
- Grades: 9-12
- Enrollment: 1,651 (2023–2024)
- Average class size: 18
- Student to teacher ratio: 17.31
- Hours in school day: 7:25AM to 2:25PM
- Campus size: 130 acres (0.53 km^{2})
- Campus type: Suburban
- Color: Red White Black
- Athletics: Baseball, Basketball, Cheerleading, Cross country, Football, Golf, Gymnastics, Hockey, Lacrosse, Rugby, Soccer, Softball, Swimming & Diving, Tennis, Track & Field, Volleyball, Wrestling
- Athletics conference: Classic 8 Conference
- Team name: Muskego Warriors
- Accreditation: North Central Accreditation
- Website: https://www.muskegonorway.org/schools/high/

Muskego High School is a comprehensive secondary school located in Muskego, Wisconsin. The school, administered by the Muskego-Norway School District, lies in southeast Waukesha County, in southeast Wisconsin. The district stretches through the city of Muskego and nearby Norway in Racine County.

== History ==
Muskego High School was constructed in 1956 at the corner of Woods Road and Racine Ave. Its first elected administrator, Arnold Wicklund, oversaw the school's construction. Prior to the school's construction, many Muskego children attended school in the Milwaukee School District.

In September 2003 the high school was completely remodeled, with 155,000 square feet (14,400 m^{2}) added to the building. Facilities that were added include several wings and a performing arts center. A controversial portion of the remodel was the addition of eight 42" flat screen TVs for the cafeteria. The campus also expanded, with approximately 40 acres (160,000 m^{2}) of new athletic fields and green space.

In April 2016, a referendum was passed to add a new artificial turf field to the nearby, district owned stadium, Inpro Field. Along with this referendum, a new set of bleachers and press box were added to the West side of Inpro Field. On the south side of Inpro Field there was a concession stand added with restrooms and the ticket booths. Most of the field was made possible by the Inpro Corporation, with donations from the Muskego Grid Iron Club (booster club) and fundraising in the community of Muskego.

== Academics ==
Transcribed credit courses are offered, which allow students to take classes at the high school while receiving credit at Waukesha County Technical College. Students may participate in the School-To-Work program, which gives students an opportunity to earn classroom credit, gain work experience and get paid at the same time. Muskego also allows students to take Advanced Placement (AP) courses. Students can earn college credit if they pass the AP College Board exam near the end of the school year. Muskego currently has AP courses in many different subject areas, including:

- United States History
- European History
- English Language and Composition
- English Literature and Composition
- Biology
- Calculus AB
- Calculus BC
- Physics B
- Psychology
- Spanish Language and Culture
- French Language and Culture
- German Language and Culture
- Music Theory
- American Government and Politics
- Gender Studies

Muskego High School also participated in the University of Wisconsin–Oshkosh C.A.P.P. Program.

== Athletics ==
Muskego High School competes as a member of the Wisconsin Interscholastic Athletic Association (WIAA) and are a part of the Classic 8 Conference. Muskego’s female athletes are active members of Under Armour’s Women of Will program that gives opportunities to female athletes around the United States.

The Muskego Warriors have 23 sports with over 90 teams. Muskego High School offers the following athletics: baseball, boys & girls basketball, cheerleading, boys & girls cross country, boys & girls downhill ski racing, football, boys & girls golf, gymnastics, girls lacrosse, boys & girls soccer, softball, boys & girls swimming, girls diving, boys & girls tennis, boys & girls track & field, boys & girls volleyball, boys & girls wrestling, girls rugby, and pom pom.

In 2018 the Muskego High School Summer Baseball team, Girls Soccer, Girls Cross Country, Gymnastics, Pom Pom, and Football team won WIAA Division 1 State Championships.

In 2018, the Warriors football program won the first state title in school history. Then repeated that reign for the 2019 and 2020 season. At the conclusion of the 2022 WIAA Football season, the Muskego football team won the Classic 8 football title five consecutive times, setting a new conference record.

Muskego’s cross country and track teams have completed successful seasons ending with multiple individual and team state championships from 2016 to 2023.

In 2023, the Warriors basketball team played against the Beloit Memorial Purple Knights. During the game, members of the crowd were reported as wearing black face masks and tank tops as part of a "thug" theme night. Members of the Beloit Memorial basketball team would later report that audience members had performed racist chants and monkey imitations, additionally reporting that racist messaging, including swastikas; and racial slurs, had been written in the locker room. While the incident made local headlines, alumni of the school were not surprised.

== Notable alumni ==
- David J. Lepak (class of 1977), former member of the Wisconsin State Assembly
- Chuck Wichgers (class of 1983), member of the Wisconsin State Assembly
- Trenni Casey (class of 1995), sports anchor for NBC Sports Boston
- Hunter Wohler (class of 2021), safety for the Indianapolis Colts
- Brandin Podziemski (2017-2018, 2018-2019), shooting guard for the Golden State Warriors
