= Water celery =

Water celery is a common name for several plants and may refer to:

- Oenanthe (plant), primarily:
  - Oenanthe javanica (Apiaceae), native to eastern Asia
- Ranunculus sceleratus (Ranunculaceae), native to North America, Africa, Europe, and Asia
- Vallisneria
  - Vallisneria americana (Hydrocharitaceae), native to North and South America
