= Muskego, Wisconsin =

- City
- Location of Muskego in Waukesha County, Wisconsin.

- Location within Wisconsin Location within the United States
- Coordinates: 42°54′4.45″N 88°7′28.7″W
- Country: United States
- State: Wisconsin
- County: Waukesha
- Incorporated: 1964

Government
  - Mayor: Rick Petfalski

Area
  - City: 35.97 sq mi (93.17 km^{2})
  - Land: 31.60 sq mi (81.85 km^{2})
  - Water: 4.37 sq mi (11.32 km^{2})
- Elevation: 801 ft (244 m)

Population (2020)
  - City: 25,032
  - Density: 800/sq mi (307/km^{2})
  - Metro: Part of Metro Milwaukee
- Time zone: UTC−6 (Central)
  - Summer (DST): UTC−5 (Central)
- ZIP Code: 53150
- Area codes: 414, 262
- FIPS code: 55-55275
- GNIS feature ID: 1570056
- Website: https://www.muskego.wi.gov/

Muskego (/mʌsˈkiːɡoʊ/) is a city in Waukesha County, Wisconsin, United States. As of the 2020 census, the city had a population of 25,032. It is part of the Milwaukee metropolitan area.

The name Muskego is derived from the Potawatomi Indian name for the area, "Mus-kee-Guaac", meaning sunfish. The Potawatomi were the original inhabitants of Muskego. Muskego is the fifth-largest community in Waukesha County, and has a large Norwegian American population. There are three lakes within the city's boundaries.

== History ==
The history of Muskego started originally as the home of the Potawatomi, who named it "Mus-kee-Guaac", which means "sunfish". The first European came in 1827 and a few years later (1833), the Potawatomi tribe ceded their lands in Wisconsin to the United States government. The first permanent settlers, coming from New Hampshire, were the Luther Parker family.

Once an agricultural area, Muskego was incorporated as a city in 1964. When it became a city it included the unincorporated communities of Durham Hill and Tess Corners. With an increase in housing developments in the city, it has become a bedroom community for Milwaukee.

=== Muskego Beach Amusement Park ===
Muskego Beach Amusement Park (1861–1967), later known as DandiLion Park (1968–1977), was a popular amusement park located on the southern bank of Little Muskego Lake.

Charles Rose, operator of Wisconsin State Fair Park, purchased Muskego Beach Amusement Park from Mrs. William Boszhardt in 1944. After World War II, he reopened it. The park included rides, games of chance, the Tailspin wooden roller coaster (1955) and was a venue for musical bands. Charles Rose died in 1963 and five years later, Willard Masterson purchased the park. He renamed it "DandiLion Park" and added more amusement rides. In 1974, an eleven-year-old boy fell from the Ferris wheel and died.

== Geography ==
According to the United States Census Bureau, the city has a total area of 35.98 square miles (93.19 km^{2}), of which 31.60 square miles (81.84 km^{2}) is land and 4.38 square miles (11.34 km^{2}) is water.

Muskego contains three lakes within its borders: Big Muskego Lake, Little Muskego Lake, and Lake Denoon.

Big Muskego Lake is a shallow 2,260-acre (9.1 km^{2}) flow-through lake in south-central Muskego. Most of the lake is less than four feet deep with a generally organic or muck bottom. Big Muskego Lake is fringed with cattail-dominated wetlands and encompasses numerous islands of cattail marsh. Bass Bay is a 110-acre (0.45 km^{2}) connected embayment of Big Muskego Lake that has a deeper basin typical of other glacially formed kettle lakes in the region. Bass Bay has a maximum depth of 23 feet (7.0 m) and has a bottom substrate of predominantly muck with some isolated sandy shoreline areas.

Little Muskego Lake is a 506-acre (2.05 km^{2}) flow-through lake with extensive shallow margins and a single deep basin. Located in the northwestern quadrant of the city, the lake has a maximum depth of 65 feet (20 m) and averages 14 feet (4.3 m) deep. The bottom substrate predominantly consists of silt or muck. Residents and visitors to Little Muskego Lake enjoy a variety of lake-related recreational activities, including boating, skiing, sailing, and fishing. The Muskego Waterbugs perform a water ski show in front of Idle Isle Park each Wednesday evening throughout the summer. The lake contains many fish species, including: largemouth bass, northern pike, walleye, and several panfish species. Most of the shores of Little Muskego Lake are developed with residential housing.

Lake Denoon is a 162-acre (0.66 km^{2}) lake in the southwestern portion of the city and is also partially located in the Town of Norway, Wisconsin. The lake has a glacially formed kettle basin that reaches a maximum depth of 55 feet (17 m) with bottom substrates varying from sands and gravel to muck. An outlet stream on the south end drains to Ke-Nong-Go-Mong (Long) Lake in Racine County. A cattail island and an extent of cattail shoreline are found on the lake's west end. The remaining lakeshore is mostly developed with residential housing.

A plan to drain the lakes, which were described as a stagnant nuisance, was proposed in 1854.

== Climate ==
Muskego

Climate chart (precipitation, max. and min. temperature)
| J | F | M | A | M | J | J | A | S | O | N | D |
| 102 −5 −12 | 96 −4 −11 | 69 6 −7 | 160 17 2 | 102 21 7 | 148 24 15 | 95 28 16 | 105 25 15 | 70 23 12 | 95 14 5 | 66 7 −1 | 79 −2 −10 |
- █ Average max. and min. temperatures in °C
- █ Precipitation totals in mm
Imperial conversion
| J | F | M | A | M | J | J | A | S | O | N | D |
| 4 23 10 | 3.8 25 12 | 2.7 43 19 | 6.3 63 36 | 4 70 45 | 5.8 75 59 | 3.7 82 61 | 4.1 77 59 | 2.8 73 54 | 3.7 57 41 | 2.6 45 30 | 3.1 28 14 |
- █ Average max. and min. temperatures in °F
- █ Precipitation totals in inches

== Demographics ==
Historical population
| Census | Pop. | Note | %± |
|---|---|---|---|
| 1960 | 8,858 | | — |
| 1970 | 11,573 | | 30.7% |
| 1980 | 15,277 | | 32.0% |
| 1990 | 16,813 | | 10.1% |
| 2000 | 21,397 | | 27.3% |
| 2010 | 24,135 | | 12.8% |
| 2020 | 25,032 | | 3.7% |
U.S. Decennial Census

Muskego is the fifth largest place in Waukesha County, after City of Waukesha, City of New Berlin, City of Brookfield, and Village of Menomonee Falls, based on 2010 and estimated 2019 population.

=== 2020 census ===
As of the 2020 census, Muskego had a population of 25,032. The median age was 45.8 years. 22.5% of residents were under the age of 18 and 20.3% of residents were 65 years of age or older. For every 100 females there were 95.9 males, and for every 100 females age 18 and over there were 94.4 males age 18 and over.

89.5% of residents lived in urban areas, while 10.5% lived in rural areas.

There were 9,671 households in Muskego, of which 30.8% had children under the age of 18 living in them. Of all households, 64.5% were married-couple households, 12.5% were households with a male householder and no spouse or partner present, and 18.4% were households with a female householder and no spouse or partner present. About 21.6% of all households were made up of individuals and 12.1% had someone living alone who was 65 years of age or older.

There were 10,016 housing units, of which 3.4% were vacant. The homeowner vacancy rate was 0.4% and the rental vacancy rate was 6.7%.

Racial composition as of the 2020 census
| Race | Number | Percent |
|---|---|---|
| White | 23,178 | 92.6% |
| Black or African American | 79 | 0.3% |
| American Indian and Alaska Native | 54 | 0.2% |
| Asian | 295 | 1.2% |
| Native Hawaiian and Other Pacific Islander | 5 | 0.0% |
| Some other race | 196 | 0.8% |
| Two or more races | 1,225 | 4.9% |
| Hispanic or Latino (of any race) | 884 | 3.5% |

=== 2010 census ===
As of the census of 2010, there were 24,135 people, 9,068 households, and 7,011 families residing in the city. The population density was 763.8 inhabitants per square mile (294.9/km^{2}). There were 9,431 housing units at an average density of 298.4 per square mile (115.2/km^{2}). The racial makeup of the city was 97.2% White, 0.3% African American, 0.2% Native American, 0.9% Asian, 0.4% from other races, and 1.0% from two or more races. Hispanic or Latino of any race were 2.3% of the population.

There were 9,068 households, of which 35.7% had children under the age of 18 living with them, 66.6% were married couples living together, 7.0% had a female householder with no husband present, 3.7% had a male householder with no wife present, and 22.7% were non-families. 18.6% of all households were made up of individuals, and 8.6% had someone living alone who was 65 years of age or older. The average household size was 2.65 and the average family size was 3.03.

The median age in the city was 42.4 years. 25.1% of residents were under the age of 18; 6.3% were between the ages of 18 and 24; 23.3% were from 25 to 44; 32.4% were from 45 to 64; and 12.9% were 65 years of age or older. The gender makeup of the city was 49.3% male and 50.7% female.

=== 2000 census ===
As of 2000 the median income for a household in the city was $64,247, and the median income for a family was $69,722. Males had a median income of $49,386 versus $30,714 for females. The per capita income for the city was $26,199. About 1.0% of families and 1.6% of the population were below the poverty line, including 1.9% of those under age 18 and 2.8% of those age 65 or over.

== Government ==
The first Mayor of the city was Jerome Gottfried, elected in 1964. He was followed by Donald Wieselmann, Wayne Salentine, David DeAngelis, Mark Slocomb, Charles Damaske, John Johnson, Kathy Chiaverotti and Rick Petfalski.

Muskego is served by the Tess Corners Fire Department, a volunteer fire department.

== Education ==
Public schools: Muskego-Norway School District:

- Bay Lane Elementary
- Lakeview Elementary (serves Muskego residents, but located in the Town of Norway)
- Mill Valley Elementary
- Muskego Lakes Middle School
- Lake Denoon Middle School
- Muskego High School

Parochial schools:

- St. Leonard K–8 Catholic School
- St. Paul's Ev. Lutheran Grade School – WELS

== Notable people ==
- Tom Clark, Commissioner of the Professional Bowlers Association (PBA), resides in Muskego
- Henry Lockney, Wisconsin State Senator and jurist, born in the town of Muskego
- Andrija Novakovich, association footballer, born in Muskego
- Luther Parker, Wisconsin territorial legislator, settler, and pioneer, lived in Muskego
- Howard Schmidt, cyber security advisor, lived in Muskego
- Chuck Wichgers, Wisconsin State Representative, lived in Muskego

== See also ==
- Muskego Settlement
