= 2018–19 NCAA Division I women's basketball season =

- Preseason AP No. 1: Notre Dame
- Regular season: November 2018 – March 2019
- NCAA Tournament: 2019
- Tournament dates: March 22, 2019 – April 7, 2019
- National Championship: Amalie Arena; Tampa, Florida
- NCAA Champions: Baylor
- Other champions: Arizona (WNIT); Appalachian State (WBI)
- Player of the Year (Naismith, Wooden): Sabrina Ionescu, Oregon (Wooden, Wade); Megan Gustafson, Iowa (Naismith)

The 2018–19 NCAA Division I women's basketball season began in November 2018 and concluded with the Final Four title game at Amalie Arena in Tampa, Florida, in April 2019. Practices officially began in September 2018.

== Season headlines ==
- June 18 – Purdue University Fort Wayne (PFW), which was set to begin operation on July 1 following the dissolution of Indiana University–Purdue University Fort Wayne (IPFW), announced that the athletic program that it would inherit from IPFW, previously known as the Fort Wayne Mastodons, would become the Purdue Fort Wayne Mastodons. PFW also changed its colors from IPFW's former blue-and-silver scheme to the old gold and black used by its new parent institution.
- September 10 – The Northeast Conference (NEC) announced that Merrimack College would start a transition from the NCAA Division II Northeast-10 Conference and join the NEC effective July 1, 2019. The Warriors will not be eligible for the NCAA tournament until becoming a full D-I member in 2023–24.
- October 3 – Long Island University announced that it would merge its two current athletic programs—the LIU Brooklyn Blackbirds, full members of the NEC, and the Division II LIU Post Pioneers—effective with the 2019–20 school year. The new program will compete under the LIU name with a new nickname and retain LIU Brooklyn's Division I and NEC memberships. This change had minimal effect on the then-existing LIU Brooklyn women's basketball program, as LIU has announced that the unified basketball team will be based at the Brooklyn campus.
- November 1 – The Associated Press preseason All-America team was released. The leading vote-getters were two guards, Louisville's Asia Durr and Oregon's Sabrina Ionescu, each with 29 of 31 votes. Joining them on the team were Connecticut forward Katie Lou Samuelson (28), Notre Dame guard Arike Ogunbowale (24), and Baylor center Kalani Brown (18). Ionescu was the only junior named; all others were seniors.
- January 11 – The Western Athletic Conference announced that Dixie State University would start a transition from Division II to D I and join the conference in July 2020.
- February 19 – Less than 12 hours after leading Georgia to a 78–56 win over Ole Miss, Lady Bulldogs head coach Joni Taylor gave birth to a daughter. Top assistant Karen Lange was named as interim head coach for what was intended to be a maternity leave, but Taylor returned to the bench for Georgia's next game on February 21.
- February 24 – Rutgers announced that head coach C. Vivian Stringer, who had missed the Scarlet Knights' game at Michigan on February 21, would take a leave for the rest of the regular season on medical advice. Stringer was initially expected to return after the Big Ten tournament, with assistant Tim Eatman serving as interim coach. However, Rutgers announced on March 15 that Stringer would not return for a likely NCAA tournament run, again on medical advice. She ultimately returned for the 2019–20 season.
- February 27 – Georgia Tech placed head coach MaChelle Joseph on administrative leave, saying in a press release that it was a "pending personnel matter", named assistant Mark Simons as interim head coach, and made no further comment on the situation. The following day, Joseph's attorney charged that the Tech athletic department had taken the action as retaliation for raising Title IX concerns within the department. Joseph would ultimately be fired (see "Coaching changes" section below).
- March 26 – The Cincinnati Enquirer reported allegations that Northern Kentucky head coach Camryn Whitaker had engaged in systematic bullying and emotional abuse of players. The previous day, the team's only senior, Taryn Taugher, published an account of her experiences on the Odyssey web platform, claiming that the university knew about Whitaker's behavior but did not address it. The Enquirer received confirmation of Taugher's account in interviews with the parents of another player, plus social media posts from multiple teammates. The university told the Enquirer that it was investigating the claims, but Taugher said that she had yet to be contacted by any administrator. On April 2, a former NKU player, Shar'Rae Davis, provided an Enquirer reporter with her own allegations, charging that Whitaker had used Davis' medical condition of ulcerative colitis to punish both her and other team members. In the interim, eight current Norse players published an open letter in Odyssey backing Whitaker.
- April 1 – North Carolina placed the entire women's coaching staff, including head coach Sylvia Hatchell, on paid administrative leave while an outside firm hired by the university reviewed the state of the program, due to what the university called "issues raised by student-athletes and others." On April 4, The Washington Post reported that among the issues were allegations that Hatchell forced several players to play through serious injuries and made a number of racially offensive remarks. Hatchell would resign following the review (see "Coaching changes" section below).
- April 6 – Sabrina Ionescu announced in The Players' Tribune that she would return for her senior season at Oregon in 2019–20. Because she turned 22 in December 2019, she had been eligible to declare for the 2019 WNBA draft.

=== Milestones and records ===
- November 13 – Rutgers head coach C. Vivian Stringer became the sixth college women's coach with 1,000 career wins following the Scarlet Knights' 73–44 pasting of Central Connecticut. She also became the first African-American college coach to reach the milestone.
- November 18 – Sabrina Ionescu recorded her 12th career triple-double in Oregon's 102–82 win over Buffalo. Already the holder of the all-divisions NCAA women's record for career triple-doubles, Ionescu equaled the NCAA record for all players regardless of sex, previously held by former BYU men's player Kyle Collinsworth.
- December 17 and 20 – Chastadie Barrs of Lamar became the first Division I player of either sex ever to record triple-doubles in consecutive games twice in her career. First, Barrs recorded 20 points, 12 rebounds, and 10 steals in the Cardinals' 93–37 blowout of Division III Howard Payne. She followed this with 23 points, 10 rebounds, and 10 steals in the Cardinals' 82–66 win over Pacific. Barrs had recorded consecutive triple-doubles early in the 2017–18 season.
- December 20 – Ionescu took sole possession of the aforementioned career triple-double record, recording her 13th with 17 points, 11 rebounds, and 13 assists in Oregon's 82–36 win over Air Force.
- December 21 – In Oregon's next game, a 115–69 blowout of UC Irvine, Ionescu recorded her 14th triple-double with 14 points, 10 rebounds, and 13 assists. This marked the second time in her career that she recorded triple-doubles in consecutive games, matching Barrs' accomplishment from the night before. Like Barrs, Ionescu had recorded consecutive triple-doubles early in the 2017–18 season—with the second game in that streak also coming the night after the second of Barrs' corresponding streak.
- January 3 – Baylor defeated then top-ranked UConn 68–57. This was the Huskies' first regular-season loss since November 2014, and ended their NCAA-record regular-season winning streak at 126 games.
- January 9, 12, and 16 – Barrs accomplished three major triple-double milestones—becoming the first Division I player of either sex ever to record triple-doubles in consecutive games twice in a single season, the first to do so three times in a career, and the second player in any NCAA division to have recorded three consecutive triple-doubles. First, Barrs recorded 17 points, 10 rebounds, and 12 steals in the Cardinals' 79–59 win over New Orleans. She followed this with 10 points, 11 rebounds, and 10 assists in the Cardinals' 57–37 win over Central Arkansas. Finally, Barrs had 15 points, 10 rebounds, and 11 assists in Lamar's 94–54 pasting of Southeastern Louisiana. The only other player with three straight triple-doubles was Danielle Carson of Youngstown State, who accomplished this feat in the 1985–86 season.
- January 20 – Ionescu recorded her sixth triple-double of the season with 21 points, 12 rebounds, and 12 assists in Oregon's 93–60 win over Arizona. This tied the all-time NCAA record for triple-doubles in a season, originally set in women's basketball by the aforementioned Danielle Carson in 1985–86 and equaled by Ionescu herself in 2017–18. (In men's basketball, the aforementioned Kyle Collinsworth had the same total in both 2014–15 and 2015–16.)
- February 2 – Shakyla Hill of Grambling State had 21 points, 16 rebounds, 13 assists, and 10 steals in the Tigers' 77–57 win over Arkansas–Pine Bluff, making her the first Division I player of either sex to record two quadruple-doubles in a career. Hill had previously recorded one in January 2018. (Note: ESPN incorrectly listed Hill as the "first player in NCAA history" to have recorded two quadruple-doubles. Suzy Venet, who played at Division III Mount Union from 1994 to 1998, recorded two quadruple-doubles in the 1996–97 season.)
- February 24 – Ionescu took sole possession of the all-time NCAA record for triple-doubles in a season, recording her seventh of the season with 13 points, 12 rebounds, and 13 assists in Oregon's 96–78 win over USC.
- February 27 – In Lamar's 97–49 blowout of Houston Baptist, Barrs collected 10 steals to give her the record for career steals in Division I women's basketball. She ended the game with 627, surpassing the previous record of 624 by Natalie White of Florida A&M (1991–95).
- March 3 – In the final regular-season game of her college career, California center Kristine Anigwe scored 32 points and claimed 30 rebounds in the Golden Bears' 80–58 win over Washington State. Anigwe's performance, which equaled the Pac-12 record for single-game rebounds, was the first Division I women's 30–30 game since Jennifer Butler accomplished the feat for UMass on December 28, 2002. Anigwe also joined former Oklahoma center Courtney Paris as the only women in Division I history to record 30 consecutive double-doubles.
- March 24 – In Oregon's 91–68 win over Indiana in the second round of the NCAA tournament, Ionescu became only the second player to record multiple triple-doubles in NCAA tournament play, collecting 29 points, 10 rebounds, and 12 assists. Ionescu, who had a triple-double in the first round of the 2018 tournament, joined former Stanford star Nicole Powell, who had consecutive triple-doubles in 2002, as the only Division I women's players with two triple-doubles in tournament play. Ionescu extended her all-divisions NCAA records for triple-doubles to 8 in a season and 18 in a career. At the time, it was speculated that Ionescu could be playing her last home game, but she ultimately announced she would return to Oregon for her senior season.

== Conference membership changes ==
Six schools joined new conferences for the 2018–19 season. Four schools switched between Division I conferences for the 2018–19 season. In addition, two schools moved from Division II starting this season. The former Division II schools are ineligible for NCAA-sponsored postseason play until completing their D-I transitions in 2022.

School	Former conference	New conference
Cal Baptist	PacWest (D-II)	WAC
Hampton	MEAC	Big South
Liberty	Big South	ASUN
North Alabama	Gulf South (D-II)	ASUN
North Dakota	Big Sky	Summit League
USC Upstate	ASUN	Big South

In addition to the schools changing conferences, the 2018–19 season was the last for Savannah State in D-I with its decision to reclassify all of its sports to D-II.

Finally, one D-I member adopted a new institutional and athletic identity. The 2017–18 school year was the last for Indiana University–Purdue University Fort Wayne (IPFW) as a single institution. Following the school's split into separate institutions governed by Indiana University and Purdue University, IPFW degree programs in health sciences are now overseen by Indiana University Fort Wayne, while all other degree programs are governed by Purdue University Fort Wayne (PFW). As noted in the "Season headlines" section, the IPFW athletic program, rebranded in 2016 as the Fort Wayne Mastodons, became the Purdue Fort Wayne Mastodons, representing only PFW.

== Arenas ==
=== New arenas ===
- Elon opened the Schar Center, which replaced their home of 37 seasons, Alumni Gym.
- After 32 seasons at the off-campus Burton Coliseum, McNeese State opened the new on-campus Health and Human Performance Education Complex (H&HP Complex).
- The two new Division I entries for 2018 continued to play at existing on-campus facilities. California Baptist plays at the CBU Events Center, which opened in 2017, and North Alabama plays at Flowers Hall, which opened in 1972 and has been home to the women's program since it began play in 1975.

=== Arenas reopening ===
Four teams returned to newly renovated arenas, all of which were closed for the 2017–18 season.

- Cincinnati returned to Fifth Third Arena.
- Houston initially planned to reopen the renamed Fertitta Center (originally Hofheinz Pavilion) by the start of the 2018–19 season, but construction delays pushed the final reopening date to December 1, with Houston's men officially reopening the facility. The women's first game after the reopening was on December 6.
- Northwestern returned to Welsh–Ryan Arena.
- Villanova returned to the renamed Finneran Pavilion (originally duPont Pavilion and later The Pavilion).

=== Temporary arenas ===
Houston began the 2018–19 season at Texas Southern's Health and Physical Education Arena, where the Cougars played most of their 2017–18 home games. The women played three home games at Texas Southern before moving into Fertitta Center.

Robert Morris planned to open the new UPMC Events Center on the site of its former on-campus Sewall Center in January 2019, but the opening has now been delayed to that summer. Until the new arena opens, the Colonials will continue to use the Student Recreation and Fitness Center, a building in the school's North Athletic Complex that opened in September 2017 as part of the UPMC Events Center project.

== Season outlook ==
=== Preseason polls ===
The top 25 from the AP and USA Today Coaches Polls.

Associated Press
Ranking	Team
1	Notre Dame (31)
2	Connecticut
3	Oregon
4	Baylor
5	Louisville
6	Mississippi State
7	Stanford
8	Oregon State
9	Maryland
10	South Carolina
11	Tennessee
11	Texas
13	Iowa
14	Georgia
15	DePaul
16	Missouri
17	NC State
18	Syracuse
19	Marquette
20	Texas A&M
21	Duke
22	South Florida
23	Arizona State
24	California
25	Miami (FL)

USA Today Coaches
Ranking	Team
1	Notre Dame (30)
2	Connecticut (1)
3	Oregon
4	Louisville
5	Baylor
6	Mississippi State
7	Stanford
8	Texas
9	Oregon State
10	Maryland
11	South Carolina
12	Tennessee
13	Georgia
14	Missouri
15	DePaul
16	NC State
17	Iowa
18	Syracuse
19	Marquette
20	Duke
21	South Florida
21	Texas A&M
23	UCLA
24	Miami (FL)
25	West Virginia

== Regular season ==
=== Early season tournaments ===
Name	Dates	Location	No. teams	Champion
Preseason WNIT	November 8–18	Campus Sites	16	Iowa State
Cancún Challenge	November 22–24	Moon Palace Golf & Spa Resort (Cancún, MX)	10	Syracuse (Riviera Division) NC State (Mayan Division)
Vancouver Showcase	November 22–24	Vancouver Convention Centre (Vancouver, BC)	8	Notre Dame
Junkanoo Jam	November 22–24	Gateway Christian Academy (Bimini, Bahamas)	10	Tennessee (Junkanoo Division) Florida State (Bimini Division)
Paradise Jam tournament	November 22–24	Sports and Fitness Center (Saint Thomas, VI)	8	Kentucky (Island Division) Connecticut (Reef Division)
Gulf Coast Showcase	November 23–25	Hertz Arena (Estero, FL)	8	Texas

=== Upsets ===
An upset is a victory by an underdog team. In the context of NCAA Division I women's basketball, this generally constitutes an unranked team defeating a team currently ranked in the Top 25. This list will highlight those upsets of ranked teams by unranked teams as well as upsets of #1 teams. Rankings are from the AP poll. Bold type indicates winning teams in "true road games"—i.e., those played on an opponent's home court (including secondary homes).

Winner	Score	Loser	Date	Tournament/Event
Northwestern	84–58	#21 Duke	November 11, 2018	
UCLA	80–69	#14 Georgia	November 14, 2018	
**Green Bay**	56–49	#16 Missouri	November 16, 2018	
Georgia Tech	63–53	#14 Georgia	November 18, 2018	
Iowa State	75–52	#24 Miami (FL)	November 18, 2018	Preseason WNIT
Kentucky	85–63	#17 South Florida	November 22, 2018	Paradise Jam Island Division
North Carolina	71–69	#17 South Florida	November 23, 2018	Paradise Jam Island Division
Michigan	70–54	#21 Missouri	November 23, 2018	Gulf Coast Showcase
Florida State	71–67	#12 Iowa	November 24, 2018	Junkanoo Jam Bimini Division
Drake	90–85^{OT}	#13 South Carolina	November 24, 2018	Vancouver Showcase
South Dakota	64–59	#24 Iowa State	November 28, 2018	
Purdue	74–63	#21 Miami (FL)	November 29, 2018	ACC–Big Ten Women's Challenge
**Lamar**	74–68	#17 Texas A&M	November 29, 2018	
**#2 UConn**	89–71	#1 Notre Dame	December 2, 2018	Jimmy V Classic/Rivalry
Gonzaga	79–73	#8 Stanford	December 2, 2018	
South Dakota State	80–71	#21 Drake	December 8, 2018	
Michigan State	88–82	#3 Oregon	December 9, 2018	
**South Dakota**	74–61	#22 Missouri	December 15, 2018	
Texas A&M	76–70	#8 Oregon State	December 15, 2018	Maui Jim Maui Classic
**Creighton**	85–82	#19 DePaul	December 29, 2018	
**Harvard**	85–79	#14 California	December 30, 2018	
Arizona	51–39	#17 Arizona State	December 30, 2018	
**Central Michigan**	90–80	#24 Miami (FL)	December 30, 2018	Miami Holiday Classic
**Rutgers**	73–65	#4 Maryland	December 31, 2018	
Michigan	76–60	#12 Minnesota	December 31, 2018	
#8 Baylor	68–57	#1 UConn	January 3, 2019	
Northwestern	70–62	#15 Michigan State	January 3, 2019	
**UCLA**	84–79^{OT}	#18 California	January 4, 2019	
**Missouri**	66–64	#10 Tennessee	January 6, 2019	
**Illinois**	66–62	#12 Minnesota	January 6, 2019	
Indiana	68–64	#15 Michigan State	January 6, 2019	
LSU	63–52	#21 Texas A&M	January 6, 2019	
Purdue	62–57	#17 Iowa	January 10, 2019	
Ohio State	55–50	#25 Indiana	January 10, 2019	
Arizona	60–55	#24 California	January 11, 2019	
Georgia	66–62	#13 Tennessee	January 13, 2019	
**Ole Miss**	55–49	#16 Kentucky	January 13, 2019	
**Clemson**	57–45	#22 Florida State	January 13, 2019	
Ohio State	65–55	#23 Michigan State	January 14, 2019	
Kansas State	87–69	#11 Texas	January 16, 2019	
West Virginia	73–64	#18 Iowa State	January 16, 2019	
**Northwestern**	75–69	#25 Indiana	January 16, 2019	
BYU	70–68	#13 Gonzaga	January 17, 2019	
Alabama	86–65	#20 Tennessee	January 17, 2019	
Georgia Tech	65–55	#12 Syracuse	January 20, 2019	
Nebraska	63–57	#23 Minnesota	January 20, 2019	
**Seton Hall**	84–73	#24 DePaul	January 20, 2019	
Purdue	56–53	#25 Indiana	January 20, 2019	Rivalry/Crimson and Gold Cup
**Miami (FL)**	84–71	#13 Syracuse	January 23, 2019	
**UCLA**	61–59	#16 Arizona State	January 25, 2019	
North Carolina	78–73	#1 Notre Dame	January 27, 2019	
**West Virginia**	64–58	#12 Texas	January 28, 2019	
Loyola Marymount	61–58	#25 BYU	January 31, 2019	
California	81–80	#8 Stanford	January 31, 2019	
Michigan	90–81	#13 Iowa	February 1, 2019	
Pepperdine	79–65	#25 BYU	February 2, 2019	
**North Carolina**	64–51	#7 NC State	February 3, 2019	
Minnesota	60–46	#17 Rutgers	February 3, 2019	
Missouri	70–65^{OT}	#18 Texas A&M	February 7, 2019	
**USC**	84–80	#17 Utah	February 8, 2019	
**UCLA**	100–90	#17 Utah	February 10, 2019	
TCU	76–69	#18 Iowa State	February 13, 2019	
**Ohio State**	59–39	#23 Rutgers	February 14, 2019	
Clemson	73–68	#21 Florida State	February 14, 2019	
Wisconsin	79–62	#24 Michigan State	February 14, 2019	
**Missouri**	75–67	#5 Mississippi State	February 14, 2019	
St. John's	81–74	#8 Marquette	February 15, 2019	
**BYU**	66–64	#13 Gonzaga	February 16, 2019	
Nebraska	82–71	#24 Michigan State	February 17, 2019	
**Kansas State**	69–60	#15 Texas	February 17, 2019	
Virginia Tech	73–65	#14 Miami (FL)	February 21, 2019	
Indiana	75–73	#10 Iowa	February 21, 2019	
**Butler**	61–57	#11 Marquette	February 22, 2019	
California	69–60	#17 Arizona State	February 22, 2019	
**UCLA**	74–69	#2 Oregon	February 22, 2019	
South Dakota State	82–78^{OT}	#23 South Dakota	February 24, 2019	
Creighton	71–65	#13 Marquette	March 1, 2019	
Missouri	70–68 ^{OT}	#13 Kentucky	March 8, 2019	SEC women's tournament
Arkansas	95–89	#12 South Carolina	March 8, 2019	SEC women's tournament
Washington	68–67	#11 Oregon State	March 8, 2019	Pac-12 women's tournament
Arkansas	58–51	#15 Texas A&M	March 9, 2019	SEC women's tournament
BYU	82–68	#12 Gonzaga	March 12, 2019	WCC women's tournament
DePaul	74–73	#13 Marquette	March 12, 2019	Big East women's tournament
Missouri State	94–79	#21 Drake	March 17, 2019	MVC women's tournament

=== Conference winners and tournament winners ===
Each of the 32 Division I athletic conferences ends its regular season with a single-elimination tournament. The team with the best regular-season record in each conference is given the number one seed in each tournament, with tiebreakers used as needed in the case of ties for the top seeding. The winners of these tournaments receive automatic invitations to the 2019 NCAA Division I women's basketball tournament.

Conference	Regular season first place	Conference player of the year	Conference Coach of the Year	Conference tournament	Tournament venue (city)	Tournament winner
America East Conference	Maine	Blanca Millan, Maine	Amy Vachon, Maine	2019 America East women's basketball tournament	Campus sites	Maine
American Athletic Conference	UConn	Napheesa Collier, UConn	Geno Auriemma, UConn	2019 American Athletic Conference women's basketball tournament	Mohegan Sun Arena (Uncasville, CT)	UConn
Atlantic 10 Conference	VCU (Note: Top seed in conference tournament); Fordham	Nicole Cardaño Hillary, George Mason	Beth O'Boyle, VCU	2019 Atlantic 10 women's basketball tournament	First round: Campus sites Remainder: A. J. Palumbo Center (Pittsburgh, PA)	Fordham
Atlantic Coast Conference	Notre Dame; Louisville	Asia Durr, Louisville	Amanda Butler, Clemson	2019 ACC women's basketball tournament	Greensboro Coliseum (Greensboro, North Carolina)	Notre Dame
Atlantic Sun Conference	Florida Gulf Coast	Nasrin Ulel, Florida Gulf Coast	Karl Smesko, Florida Gulf Coast	2019 ASUN women's basketball tournament	Campus sites	Florida Gulf Coast
Big 12 Conference	Baylor	Bridget Carleton, Iowa State	Kim Mulkey, Baylor	2019 Big 12 women's basketball tournament	Chesapeake Energy Arena (Oklahoma City, OK)	Baylor
Big East Conference	Marquette	Natisha Hiedeman, Marquette	Kurt Godlevske, Butler	2019 Big East women's basketball tournament	Wintrust Arena (Chicago, IL)	DePaul
Big Sky Conference	Idaho	Mikayla Ferenz, Idaho	Jon Newlee, Idaho	2019 Big Sky Conference women's basketball tournament	CenturyLink Arena (Boise, ID)	Portland State
Big South Conference	Radford	Ashley Bates, Hampton	Mike McGuire, Radford	2019 Big South Conference women's basketball tournament	First round: Campus sites Quarterfinals/semifinals: #1 seed Final: Top surviving seed	Radford
Big Ten Conference	Maryland	Megan Gustafson, Iowa	Brenda Frese, Maryland	2019 Big Ten Conference women's basketball tournament	Bankers Life Fieldhouse (Indianapolis, IN)	Iowa
Big West Conference	UC Davis	Morgan Bertsch, UC Davis	Jennifer Gross, UC Davis	2019 Big West Conference women's basketball tournament	First round and quarterfinals: Titan Gym (Fullerton, CA); Semifinals and final: Honda Center (Anaheim, CA)	UC Davis
Colonial Athletic Association	James Madison	Bailey Greenberg, Drexel	Diane Richardson, Towson	2019 CAA women's basketball tournament	Bob Carpenter Center (Newark, DE)	Towson
Conference USA	Rice	Erica Ogwumike, Rice	Tina Langley, Rice	2019 Conference USA women's basketball tournament	Ford Center (Frisco, TX)	Rice
Horizon League	Wright State	Macee Williams, IUPUI	Katrina Merriweather, Wright State	2019 Horizon League women's basketball tournament	Quarterfinals: Campus sites Semifinals and final: Little Caesars Arena (Detroit, MI)	Wright State
Ivy League	Princeton; Penn	Bella Alarie, Princeton	Mike McLaughlin, Penn	2019 Ivy League women's basketball tournament	John J. Lee Amphitheater (New Haven, CT)	Princeton
Metro Atlantic Athletic Conference	Quinnipiac	Stella Johnson, Rider	Tricia Fabbri, Quinnipiac	2019 MAAC women's basketball tournament	Times Union Center (Albany, NY)	Quinnipiac
Mid-American Conference	Central Michigan (West); Ohio (East)	Reyna Frost, Central Michigan	Sue Guevara, Central Michigan	2019 Mid-American Conference women's basketball tournament	First round: Campus sites Remainder: Quicken Loans Arena (Cleveland, OH)	Buffalo
Mid-Eastern Athletic Conference	North Carolina A&T	NaJai Pollard, Delaware State	Fred Batchelor, Maryland Eastern Shore	2019 MEAC women's basketball tournament	Norfolk Scope (Norfolk, VA)	Bethune–Cookman
Missouri Valley Conference	Drake	Becca Hittner, Drake	Kellie Harper, Missouri State	2019 Missouri Valley Conference women's basketball tournament	TaxSlayer Center (Moline, IL)	Missouri State
Mountain West Conference	Boise State	Jaisa Nunn, New Mexico	Gordy Presnell, Boise State	2019 Mountain West Conference women's basketball tournament	Thomas & Mack Center (Paradise, NV)	Boise State
Northeast Conference	Robert Morris	Jessica Kovatch, Saint Francis (PA)	Charlie Buscaglia, Robert Morris	2019 Northeast Conference women's basketball tournament	Campus sites	Robert Morris
Ohio Valley Conference	Belmont	Darby Maggard, Belmont	Kim Rosamond, Tennessee Tech	2019 Ohio Valley Conference women's basketball tournament	Ford Center (Evansville, IN)	Belmont
Pac-12 Conference	Oregon	Sabrina Ionescu, Oregon	Kelly Graves, Oregon (coaches); Cori Close, UCLA (media)	2019 Pac-12 Conference women's basketball tournament	MGM Grand Garden Arena (Paradise, NV)	Stanford
Patriot League	Bucknell; American	Cecily Carl, American	Marisa Moseley, Boston University	2019 Patriot League women's basketball tournament	Campus sites	Bucknell
Southeastern Conference	Mississippi State	Teaira McCowan, Mississippi State	Matthew Mitchell, Kentucky (coaches); Vic Schaefer, Mississippi State (AP & coaches)	2019 SEC women's basketball tournament	Bon Secours Wellness Arena (Greenville, SC)	Mississippi State
Southern Conference	Mercer	Amanda Thompson, Mercer (coaches); KeKe Calloway, Mercer (media)	Susie Gardner, Mercer	2019 Southern Conference women's basketball tournament	U.S. Cellular Center (Asheville, NC)	Mercer
Southland Conference	Lamar	Chastadie Barrs, Lamar	Ravon Justice, Sam Houston State	2019 Southland Conference women's basketball tournament	Leonard E. Merrell Center (Katy, TX)	Abilene Christian
Southwestern Athletic Conference	Southern	Shakyla Hill, Grambling State	Carlos Funchess, Southern	2019 SWAC women's basketball tournament	Quarterfinals: Campus sites Semifinals and final: Bill Harris Arena (Birmingham, AL)	Southern
Summit League	South Dakota State	Macy Miller, South Dakota State	Dawn Plitzuweit, South Dakota	2019 Summit League women's basketball tournament	Denny Sanford Premier Center (Sioux Falls, SD)	South Dakota State
Sun Belt Conference	Little Rock; UT Arlington	Ronjanae DeGray, Little Rock; Cierra Johnson, UT Arlington	Krista Gerlich, UT Arlington	2019 Sun Belt Conference women's basketball tournament	First round: Campus sites Remainder: Lakefront Arena (New Orleans, LA)	Little Rock
West Coast Conference	Gonzaga	Yasmine Robinson-Bacote, Pepperdine	Lisa Fortier, Gonzaga	2019 West Coast Conference women's basketball tournament	Orleans Arena (Paradise, NV)	BYU
Western Athletic Conference	New Mexico State	Brooke Salas, New Mexico State	Jarrod Olson, California Baptist	2019 WAC women's basketball tournament	Orleans Arena (Paradise, NV)	New Mexico State

=== Statistical leaders ===
**Points per game**			**Rebounds per game**			**Assists per game**			**Steals per game**		
Player	School	PPG	Player	School	RPG	Player	School	APG	Player	School	SPG
Megan Gustafson	Iowa	27.8	Kristine Anigwe	California	16.2	Amy O'Neill	St. Francis Brooklyn	8.6	Chastadie Barrs	Lamar	6.23
Cierra Dillard	Buffalo	25.2	Teaira McCowan	Mississippi St.	13.5	Tiana Mangakahia	Syracuse	8.4	Shakyla Hill	Grambling St.	4.56
Aari McDonald	Arizona	24.1	Megan Gustafson	Iowa	13.4	Sabrina Ionescu	Oregon	8.2	Ashley Bates	Hampton	4.31
Morgan Bertsch	UC Davis	23.6	Reyna Frost	Central Michigan	13.3	Shania Johnson	Stony Brook	7.6	Stephanie Karcz	Loyola (MD)	4.24
Kierra Anthony	Louisiana Tech	23.4	Madison Hovren	Army	13.1	Taja Cole	Georgia	7.0	LaShonda Monk	East Carolina	3.87

**Blocked shots per game**			**Field goal percentage**			**Three-point field goal percentage**			**Free throw percentage**		
Player	School	BPG	Player	School	FG%	Player	School	3FG%	Player	School	FT%
Nancy Mulkey	Rice	3.92	Megan Gustafson	Iowa	.696	Marta Gomez	Wyoming	.474	Presley Hudson	Central Michigan	.944
Channon Fluker	Cal St. Northridge	3.61	Ruthy Hebard	Oregon	.670	Taylor Robertson	Oklahoma	.467	Rebekah Hand	Marist	.941
Eleah Parker	Penn	3.19	Mary Gedaka	Villanova	.663	Dara Mabrey	Virginia Tech	.462	Savannah Smith	Northern Colorado	.928
Ae'Rianna Harris	Purdue	3.06	Teaira McCowan	Mississippi St.	.662	Taylor Kissinger	Nebraska	.456	Marta Gomez	Wyoming	.927
Kayla Cooper-Williams	James Madison	2.88	Brianna Turner	Notre Dame	.640	Maci Morris	Kentucky	.452	Japreece Dean	UCLA	.922

== Postseason ==
=== NCAA tournament ===
==== Tournament upsets ====
For this list, an "upset" is defined as a win by a team seeded 7 or more spots below its defeated opponent.

Date	Winner	Score	Loser	Region	Round
March 25	Missouri State (11)	69–60	Iowa State (3)	Chicago	Round of 32

== Conference standings ==
2018–19 American Athletic Conference women's basketball standings
	Conf.				Overall
Team	W		L	PCT	W		L	PCT
No. 2 UConn †	16	–	0	1.000	35	–	3	.921
UCF	13	–	3	.813	26	–	7	.788
Cincinnati	12	–	4	.750	24	–	11	.686
Houston	9	–	7	.563	15	–	16	.484
South Florida	7	–	9	.438	19	–	16	.543
Temple	7	–	9	.438	11	–	18	.379
East Carolina	6	–	10	.375	16	–	15	.516
Tulsa	6	–	10	.375	13	–	18	.419
Tulane	5	–	11	.313	15	–	16	.484
Wichita State	5	–	11	.313	12	–	18	.400
SMU	5	–	11	.313	11	–	19	.367
Memphis	5	–	11	.313	11	–	20	.355
† 2019 AAC tournament winner As of March 17, 2019; Rankings from AP poll

2018–19 America East Conference women's basketball standings
	Conf.				Overall
Team	W		L	PCT	W		L	PCT
Maine †	15	–	1	.938	25	–	8	.758
Hartford	14	–	2	.875	23	–	11	.676
Stony Brook	11	–	5	.688	23	–	8	.742
Albany	9	–	7	.563	13	–	18	.419
Binghamton	7	–	9	.438	12	–	18	.400
Vermont	7	–	9	.438	11	–	18	.379
UMBC	3	–	13	.188	10	–	20	.333
UMass Lowell	3	–	13	.188	7	–	22	.241
New Hampshire	3	–	13	.188	6	–	24	.200
† 2019 America East tournament winner

2018–19 Atlantic 10 women's basketball standings
	Conf.				Overall
Team	W		L	PCT	W		L	PCT
Fordham †	13	–	3	.813	25	–	9	.735
VCU	13	–	3	.813	24	–	10	.706
Duquesne	11	–	5	.688	19	–	13	.594
Dayton	10	–	6	.625	17	–	14	.548
Davidson	10	–	6	.625	17	–	15	.531
Saint Louis	9	–	7	.563	15	–	16	.484
George Mason	8	–	8	.500	16	–	14	.533
Massachusetts	7	–	9	.438	16	–	16	.500
Saint Joseph's	7	–	9	.438	12	–	19	.387
George Washington	7	–	9	.438	10	–	20	.333
Richmond	6	–	10	.375	9	–	21	.300
St. Bonaventure	5	–	11	.313	8	–	22	.267
La Salle	3	–	13	.188	6	–	25	.194
Rhode Island	3	–	13	.188	8	–	21	.276
† 2019 A10 tournament winner Rankings from AP poll

2018–19 ASUN women's basketball standings
	Conf.				Overall
Team	W		L	PCT	W		L	PCT
Florida Gulf Coast †	16	–	0	1.000	28	–	5	.848
Stetson	11	–	5	.688	16	–	16	.500
North Alabama	10	–	6	.625	21	–	9	.700
Liberty	10	–	6	.625	16	–	16	.500
North Florida	9	–	7	.563	15	–	14	.517
Jacksonville	7	–	9	.438	14	–	16	.467
Kennesaw State	4	–	12	.250	9	–	22	.290
NJIT	3	–	13	.188	6	–	24	.200
Lipscomb	2	–	14	.125	4	–	25	.138
† 2019 ASUN Tournament winner Rankings from AP poll

2018–19 ACC women's basketball standings
	Conf.				Overall
Team	W		L	PCT	W		L	PCT
No. 3 Notre Dame†	14	–	2	.875	35	–	4	.897
No. 5 Louisville	14	–	2	.875	32	–	4	.889
No. 10 NC State	12	–	4	.750	28	–	6	.824
No. 19 Miami (FL)	12	–	4	.750	25	–	9	.735
No. 12 Syracuse	11	–	5	.688	25	–	9	.735
No. 25 Florida State	10	–	6	.625	24	–	9	.727
Clemson	9	–	7	.563	20	–	13	.606
North Carolina	8	–	8	.500	18	–	15	.545
Georgia Tech	7	–	9	.438	17	–	13	.567
Virginia Tech	6	–	10	.375	22	–	12	.647
Duke	6	–	10	.375	15	–	15	.500
Virginia	5	–	11	.313	12	–	19	.387
Boston College	3	–	13	.188	14	–	16	.467
Pittsburgh	2	–	14	.125	11	–	20	.355
Wake Forest	1	–	15	.063	10	–	20	.333
† 2019 ACC tournament winner As of March 7, 2019; Rankings from AP poll

2018–19 Big East Conference women's basketball standings
	Conf.				Overall
Team	W		L	PCT	W		L	PCT
No. 18 Marquette	15	–	3	.833	27	–	8	.771
No. 24 DePaul †	14	–	4	.778	26	–	8	.765
Butler	11	–	7	.611	23	–	10	.697
Villanova	9	–	9	.500	19	–	13	.594
Georgetown	9	–	9	.500	19	–	15	.559
Providence	8	–	10	.444	19	–	16	.543
Creighton	8	–	10	.444	15	–	16	.484
Seton Hall	7	–	11	.389	15	–	16	.484
St. John's	7	–	11	.389	15	–	16	.484
Xavier	2	–	16	.111	11	–	19	.367
† 2019 Big East tournament winner As of March 12, 2019; Rankings from AP poll

2018–19 Big Sky women's basketball standings
	Conf.				Overall
Team	W		L	PCT	W		L	PCT
Idaho	16	–	4	.800	22	–	12	.647
Northern Colorado	15	–	5	.750	21	–	11	.656
Idaho State	15	–	5	.750	20	–	11	.645
Portland State †	14	–	6	.700	25	–	8	.758
Montana State	11	–	9	.550	16	–	15	.516
Eastern Washington	9	–	11	.450	13	–	20	.394
Montana	9	–	11	.450	14	–	16	.467
Northern Arizona	8	–	12	.400	13	–	18	.419
Sacramento State	6	–	14	.300	10	–	19	.345
Southern Utah	4	–	16	.200	8	–	23	.258
Weber State	3	–	17	.150	6	–	25	.194
† 2019 Big Sky tournament winner Rankings from AP poll

2018–19 Big South women's basketball standings
	Conf.				Overall
Team	W		L	PCT	W		L	PCT
Radford †	17	–	1	.944	26	–	6	.813
High Point	15	–	3	.833	22	–	8	.733
Hampton	12	–	6	.667	16	–	14	.533
UNC Asheville	11	–	7	.611	17	–	13	.567
Campbell	10	–	8	.556	20	–	12	.625
Gardner-Webb	10	–	8	.556	16	–	15	.516
Charleston Southern	9	–	9	.500	14	–	17	.452
Winthrop	6	–	12	.333	10	–	20	.333
Presbyterian	4	–	14	.222	7	–	24	.226
USC Upstate	3	–	15	.167	7	–	23	.233
Longwood	2	–	16	.111	3	–	26	.103
† 2019 Big South tournament winner As of March 14, 2019; Rankings from AP poll

2018–19 Big Ten women's basketball standings
	Conf.				Overall
Team	W		L	PCT	W		L	PCT
No. 9 Maryland	15	–	3	.833	29	–	5	.853
No. 8 Iowa †	14	–	4	.778	29	–	7	.806
Rutgers	13	–	5	.722	22	–	10	.688
Michigan	11	–	7	.611	22	–	12	.647
Ohio State	10	–	8	.556	14	–	15	.483
Minnesota	9	–	9	.500	21	–	11	.656
Michigan State	9	–	9	.500	21	–	12	.636
Northwestern	9	–	9	.500	21	–	15	.583
Nebraska	9	–	9	.500	14	–	16	.467
Indiana	8	–	10	.444	21	–	13	.618
Purdue	8	–	10	.444	19	–	15	.559
Penn State	5	–	13	.278	12	–	18	.400
Wisconsin	4	–	14	.222	15	–	18	.455
Illinois	2	–	16	.111	10	–	20	.333
† 2019 Big Ten tournament winner Rankings from AP poll

2018–19 Big West women's basketball standings
	Conf.				Overall
Team	W		L	PCT	W		L	PCT
UC Davis †	15	–	1	.938	25	–	7	.781
UC Riverside	10	–	6	.625	17	–	15	.531
Cal State Northridge	10	–	6	.625	16	–	15	.516
Hawai'i	10	–	6	.625	15	–	16	.484
UC Irvine	8	–	8	.500	20	–	11	.645
Cal State Fullerton	6	–	10	.375	14	–	16	.467
Long Beach State	5	–	11	.313	9	–	22	.290
UC Santa Barbara	5	–	11	.313	8	–	22	.267
Cal Poly	3	–	13	.188	6	–	21	.222
† 2019 Big West tournament winner As of March 17, 2019; Rankings from AP poll

2018–19 Big 12 Conference women's basketball standings
	Conf.				Overall
Team	W		L	PCT	W		L	PCT
No. 1 Baylor †	18	–	0	1.000	37	–	1	.974
No. 13 Iowa State	13	–	5	.722	26	–	9	.743
No. 23 Texas	12	–	6	.667	23	–	10	.697
West Virginia	11	–	7	.611	22	–	11	.667
Kansas State	11	–	7	.611	21	–	12	.636
TCU	10	–	8	.556	24	–	11	.686
Oklahoma State	5	–	13	.278	14	–	16	.467
Oklahoma	4	–	14	.222	8	–	22	.267
Texas Tech	4	–	14	.222	14	–	17	.452
Kansas	2	–	16	.111	13	–	18	.419
† 2019 Big 12 Tournament winner Rankings from AP poll

2018–19 CAA women's basketball standings
	Conf.				Overall
Team	W		L	PCT	W		L	PCT
James Madison	17	–	1	.944	29	–	6	.829
Drexel	14	–	4	.778	24	–	9	.727
Towson †	11	–	7	.611	20	–	13	.606
Delaware	11	–	7	.611	16	–	15	.516
UNC Wilmington	11	–	7	.611	18	–	12	.600
Northeastern	9	–	9	.500	20	–	12	.625
William & Mary	7	–	11	.389	14	–	17	.452
Elon	4	–	14	.222	9	–	21	.300
Hofstra	3	–	15	.167	11	–	22	.333
Charleston	3	–	15	.167	7	–	23	.233
† 2019 CAA tournament winner As of March 31, 2019; Rankings from AP poll

2018–19 Conference USA women's basketball standings
	Conf.				Overall
Team	W		L	PCT	W		L	PCT
No. 21 Rice †	16	–	0	1.000	28	–	4	.875
UAB	12	–	4	.750	26	–	7	.788
Middle Tennessee	11	–	5	.688	23	–	11	.676
Western Kentucky	11	–	5	.688	20	–	15	.571
Old Dominion	10	–	6	.625	21	–	11	.656
Marshall	10	–	6	.625	17	–	15	.531
Charlotte	9	–	7	.563	18	–	14	.563
Southern Miss	9	–	7	.563	18	–	14	.563
North Texas	7	–	9	.438	18	–	16	.529
Louisiana Tech	6	–	10	.375	14	–	16	.467
UTEP	5	–	11	.313	9	–	22	.290
UTSA	2	–	14	.125	7	–	21	.250
FIU	2	–	14	.125	5	–	24	.172
Florida Atlantic	2	–	14	.125	5	–	25	.167
† 2019 C-USA Tournament winner Rankings from AP poll

2018–19 Horizon League women's basketball standings
	Conf.				Overall
Team	W		L	PCT	W		L	PCT
Wright State†	16	–	2	.889	27	–	7	.794
Green Bay	15	–	3	.833	22	–	10	.688
Youngstown State	13	–	5	.722	22	–	10	.688
IUPUI	13	–	5	.722	20	–	12	.625
Milwaukee	10	–	8	.556	15	–	15	.500
Northern Kentucky	10	–	8	.556	11	–	18	.379
Cleveland State	7	–	11	.389	10	–	19	.345
Oakland	3	–	15	.167	6	–	24	.200
Detroit Mercy	2	–	16	.111	4	–	25	.138
UIC	1	–	17	.056	3	–	26	.103
† 2019 Horizon League tournament winner Rankings from AP poll

2018–19 Ivy League women's basketball standings
	Conf.				Overall
Team	W		L	PCT	W		L	PCT
Penn	12	–	2	.857	24	–	6	.800
Princeton *†	12	–	2	.857	22	–	10	.688
Harvard	9	–	5	.643	17	–	12	.586
Yale	6	–	8	.429	16	–	13	.552
Dartmouth	6	–	8	.429	13	–	14	.481
Cornell	6	–	8	.429	12	–	14	.462
Columbia	4	–	10	.286	8	–	19	.296
Brown	1	–	13	.071	9	–	21	.300
† 2019 Ivy League Tournament winner * Tournament #1 seed As of March 23, 2019; Rankings from AP Poll

2018–19 Mid-American Conference women's basketball standings
	Conf.				Overall
Team	W		L	PCT	W		L	PCT
East
Ohio	14	–	4	.778	30	–	6	.833
Miami (OH)	13	–	5	.722	23	–	9	.719
Buffalo †	12	–	6	.667	24	–	10	.706
Kent State	11	–	7	.611	20	–	13	.606
Akron	7	–	11	.389	16	–	15	.516
Bowling Green	2	–	16	.111	9	–	21	.300
West
Central Michigan	15	–	3	.833	25	–	8	.758
Toledo	11	–	7	.611	21	–	12	.636
Northern Illinois	10	–	8	.556	19	–	13	.594
Eastern Michigan	6	–	12	.333	14	–	17	.452
Western Michigan	4	–	14	.222	10	–	20	.333
Ball State	3	–	15	.167	8	–	23	.258
† 2019 MAC tournament winner

2018–19 MAAC women's basketball standings
	Conf.				Overall
Team	W		L	PCT	W		L	PCT
Quinnipiac †	18	–	0	1.000	26	–	7	.788
Rider	14	–	4	.778	19	–	13	.594
Marist	13	–	5	.722	23	–	10	.697
Monmouth	9	–	9	.500	14	–	17	.452
Canisius	9	–	9	.500	11	–	19	.367
Manhattan	9	–	9	.500	12	–	19	.387
Siena	8	–	10	.444	12	–	18	.400
Niagara	8	–	10	.444	12	–	19	.387
Fairfield	7	–	11	.389	11	–	20	.355
Iona	3	–	15	.167	5	–	26	.161
Saint Peter's	1	–	17	.056	6	–	24	.200
† 2019 MAAC tournament winner As of March 23, 2019; Rankings from AP poll

2018–19 MEAC women's basketball standings
	Conf.				Overall
Team	W		L	PCT	W		L	PCT
North Carolina A&T	16	–	0	1.000	20	–	12	.625
Maryland-Eastern Shore	12	–	4	.750	17	–	14	.548
Bethune–Cookman †	11	–	5	.688	21	–	11	.656
Howard	10	–	6	.625	18	–	13	.581
Norfolk State	10	–	6	.625	17	–	15	.531
South Carolina State	8	–	8	.500	16	–	16	.500
Morgan State	8	–	8	.500	10	–	21	.323
North Carolina Central	5	–	11	.313	9	–	22	.290
Savannah State	5	–	11	.313	7	–	19	.269
Delaware State	5	–	11	.313	7	–	21	.250
Coppin State	4	–	12	.250	5	–	25	.167
Florida A&M	2	–	14	.125	4	–	25	.138
† 2019 MEAC tournament winner As of March 17, 2019; Rankings from AP poll

2018–19 Missouri Valley Conference women's basketball standings
	Conf.				Overall
Team	W		L	PCT	W		L	PCT
Drake	17	–	1	.944	27	–	7	.794
Missouri State †	16	–	2	.889	25	–	10	.714
Northern Iowa	12	–	6	.667	20	–	13	.606
Illinois State	11	–	7	.611	19	–	12	.613
Bradley	10	–	8	.556	20	–	10	.667
Southern Illinois	8	–	10	.444	15	–	15	.500
Loyola–Chicago	6	–	12	.333	13	–	18	.419
Indiana State	5	–	13	.278	11	–	19	.367
Valparaiso	3	–	15	.167	8	–	24	.250
Evansville	2	–	16	.111	4	–	26	.133
† 2019 MVC tournament winner As of March 30, 2019; Rankings from AP poll

2018–19 Mountain West Conference women's basketball standings
	Conf.				Overall
Team	W		L	PCT	W		L	PCT
Boise State †	16	–	2	.889	28	–	5	.848
New Mexico	14	–	4	.778	24	–	7	.774
Wyoming	13	–	5	.722	25	–	9	.735
Fresno State	11	–	7	.611	19	–	13	.594
Utah State	10	–	8	.556	17	–	15	.531
UNLV	10	–	8	.556	12	–	18	.400
Nevada	7	–	11	.389	12	–	19	.387
San Diego State	7	–	11	.389	14	–	18	.438
San Jose State	5	–	13	.278	6	–	24	.200
Air Force	4	–	14	.222	8	–	22	.267
Colorado State	2	–	16	.111	8	–	22	.267
† 2019 MW tournament winner Rankings from AP poll

2018–19 Northeast Conference women's basketball standings
	Conf.				Overall
Team	W		L	PCT	W		L	PCT
Robert Morris †	16	–	2	.889	22	–	11	.667
Sacred Heart	14	–	4	.778	19	–	13	.594
St. Francis Brooklyn	12	–	6	.667	18	–	13	.581
Saint Francis (PA)	11	–	7	.611	16	–	17	.485
Bryant	9	–	9	.500	11	–	19	.367
Mount St. Mary's	8	–	10	.444	15	–	16	.484
Wagner	8	–	10	.444	10	–	20	.333
Fairleigh Dickinson	5	–	13	.278	8	–	22	.267
Central Connecticut	4	–	14	.222	7	–	21	.250
LIU Brooklyn	3	–	15	.167	4	–	25	.138
† 2019 NEC tournament winner As of March 16, 2019; Rankings from AP poll

2018–19 Ohio Valley Conference women's basketball standings
	Conf.				Overall
Team	W		L	PCT	W		L	PCT
Belmont †	16	–	2	.889	26	–	7	.788
UT Martin	13	–	5	.722	23	–	9	.719
Morehead State	13	–	5	.722	24	–	11	.686
Tennessee Tech	12	–	6	.667	22	–	11	.667
Austin Peay	10	–	8	.556	15	–	15	.500
Jacksonville State	9	–	9	.500	15	–	15	.500
Murray State	9	–	9	.500	13	–	17	.433
SIU Edwardsville	8	–	10	.444	13	–	16	.448
Southeast Missouri State	8	–	10	.444	13	–	17	.433
Eastern Illinois	5	–	13	.278	11	–	18	.379
Tennessee State	5	–	13	.278	5	–	25	.167
Eastern Kentucky	0	–	18	.000	2	–	27	.069
† 2019 OVC tournament winner Rankings from AP poll

2018–19 Pac-12 Conference women's basketball standings
	Conf.				Overall
Team	W		L	PCT	W		L	PCT
No. 7 Oregon	16	–	2	.889	33	–	5	.868
No. 6 Stanford †	15	–	3	.833	31	–	5	.861
No. 11 Oregon State	14	–	4	.778	26	–	8	.765
No. 20 UCLA	12	–	6	.667	22	–	13	.629
No. 22 Arizona State	10	–	7	.588	22	–	11	.667
Utah	9	–	9	.500	20	–	10	.667
California	9	–	9	.500	20	–	13	.606
Arizona	7	–	11	.389	24	–	13	.649
USC	7	–	11	.389	17	–	13	.567
Washington State	4	–	14	.222	9	–	21	.300
Washington	2	–	15	.118	11	–	21	.344
Colorado	2	–	16	.111	12	–	18	.400
† 2019 Pac-12 Tournament winner Rankings from AP Poll

2018–19 Patriot League women's basketball standings
	Conf.				Overall
Team	W		L	PCT	W		L	PCT
Bucknell †	16	–	2	.889	28	–	6	.824
American	16	–	2	.889	22	–	11	.667
Lehigh	12	–	6	.667	21	–	10	.677
Boston University	11	–	7	.611	15	–	14	.517
Holy Cross	9	–	9	.500	18	–	13	.581
Colgate	8	–	10	.444	12	–	17	.414
Army	6	–	12	.333	11	–	19	.367
Navy	5	–	13	.278	10	–	19	.345
Loyola (MD)	5	–	13	.278	7	–	24	.226
Lafayette	2	–	16	.111	8	–	23	.258
† 2019 Patriot League tournament winner As of March 22, 2019; Rankings from AP poll

2018–19 Southern Conference women's basketball standings
	Conf.				Overall
Team	W		L	PCT	W		L	PCT
Mercer †	14	–	0	1.000	25	–	8	.758
Furman	9	–	5	.643	19	–	14	.576
Chattanooga	8	–	6	.571	14	–	17	.452
East Tennessee State	8	–	6	.571	10	–	21	.323
Wofford	7	–	7	.500	16	–	15	.516
UNC Greensboro	5	–	9	.357	11	–	19	.367
Samford	5	–	9	.357	10	–	20	.333
Western Carolina	0	–	14	.000	4	–	26	.133
† 2019 SoCon Tournament winner

2018–19 Southland Conference women's basketball standings
	Conf.				Overall
Team	W		L	PCT	W		L	PCT
Lamar	17	–	1	.944	24	–	7	.774
Stephen F. Austin	16	–	2	.889	25	–	7	.781
Nicholls	14	–	4	.778	20	–	12	.625
Abilene Christian †	13	–	5	.722	23	–	10	.697
Sam Houston State	11	–	7	.611	16	–	13	.552
Texas A&M–CC	8	–	10	.444	17	–	16	.515
New Orleans	8	–	10	.444	12	–	16	.429
Central Arkansas	6	–	12	.333	12	–	18	.400
Northwestern State	6	–	12	.333	11	–	18	.379
McNeese State	5	–	13	.278	7	–	22	.241
Incarnate Word	5	–	13	.278	5	–	24	.172
Houston Baptist	4	–	14	.222	9	–	19	.321
Southeastern Louisiana	4	–	14	.222	9	–	20	.310
† 2019 Southland tournament winner Rankings from AP poll

2018–19 SEC women's basketball standings
	Conf.				Overall
Team	W		L	PCT	W		L	PCT
No. 4 Mississippi State †	15	–	1	.938	33	–	3	.917
No. 15 South Carolina	13	–	3	.813	23	–	9	.719
No. 14 Texas A&M	12	–	4	.750	26	–	7	.788
No. 17 Kentucky	11	–	5	.688	25	–	8	.758
Missouri	10	–	6	.625	24	–	11	.686
Auburn	9	–	7	.563	22	–	10	.688
Georgia	9	–	7	.563	18	–	12	.600
Tennessee	7	–	9	.438	19	–	13	.594
LSU	7	–	9	.438	16	–	13	.552
Arkansas	6	–	10	.375	22	–	15	.595
Alabama	5	–	11	.313	14	–	17	.452
Ole Miss	3	–	13	.188	9	–	22	.290
Florida	3	–	13	.188	8	–	23	.258
Vanderbilt	2	–	14	.125	7	–	23	.233
† 2019 SEC tournament winner Rankings from AP poll

2018–19 SWAC women's basketball standings
	Conf.				Overall
Team	W		L	PCT	W		L	PCT
Southern †	14	–	4	.778	20	–	13	.606
Prairie View A&M	13	–	5	.722	17	–	14	.548
Jackson State	12	–	6	.667	18	–	14	.563
Grambling State	12	–	6	.667	16	–	16	.500
Texas Southern	11	–	7	.611	15	–	15	.500
Alabama State	10	–	8	.556	11	–	19	.367
Alabama A&M	8	–	10	.444	13	–	17	.433
Mississippi Valley State	5	–	13	.278	6	–	24	.200
Alcorn State	3	–	15	.167	4	–	26	.133
Arkansas-Pine Bluff	2	–	16	.111	5	–	20	.200
† 2019 SWAC tournament winner Rankings from AP poll

2018–19 Sun Belt Conference women's basketball standings
	Conf.				Overall
Team	W		L	PCT	W		L	PCT
UT Arlington	15	–	3	.833	24	–	8	.750
Little Rock †	15	–	3	.833	21	–	11	.656
Troy	13	–	5	.722	22	–	9	.710
Georgia State	11	–	7	.611	17	–	14	.548
Appalachian State	10	–	8	.556	22	–	14	.611
South Alabama	9	–	9	.500	25	–	11	.694
Texas State	9	–	9	.500	14	–	17	.452
Coastal Carolina	8	–	10	.444	17	–	15	.531
Arkansas State	7	–	11	.389	12	–	18	.400
Louisiana	5	–	13	.278	7	–	23	.233
Louisiana–Monroe	4	–	14	.222	10	–	19	.345
Georgia Southern	2	–	16	.111	7	–	22	.241
† 2019 Sun Belt tournament winner

2018–19 Summit League women's basketball standings
	Conf.				Overall
Team	W		L	PCT	W		L	PCT
South Dakota State †	15	–	1	.938	28	–	7	.800
South Dakota	14	–	2	.875	28	–	6	.824
Oral Roberts	10	–	6	.625	18	–	13	.581
Denver	10	–	6	.625	18	–	14	.563
Western Illinois	8	–	8	.500	12	–	18	.400
North Dakota	6	–	10	.375	12	–	19	.387
North Dakota State	4	–	12	.250	7	–	22	.241
Purdue Fort Wayne	3	–	13	.188	7	–	22	.241
Omaha	2	–	14	.125	8	–	21	.276
† 2019 Summit League Tournament winner Rankings from AP Poll

2018–19 West Coast Conference women's basketball standings
	Conf.				Overall
Team	W		L	PCT	W		L	PCT
No. 16 Gonzaga	16	–	2	.889	29	–	5	.853
BYU †	15	–	3	.833	26	–	7	.788
Pepperdine	12	–	6	.667	22	–	12	.647
Saint Mary's	12	–	6	.667	21	–	12	.636
Pacific	10	–	8	.556	19	–	13	.594
Loyola Marymount	10	–	8	.556	18	–	15	.545
Santa Clara	6	–	12	.333	14	–	17	.452
Portland	5	–	13	.278	13	–	17	.433
San Diego	2	–	16	.111	9	–	21	.300
San Francisco	2	–	16	.111	7	–	24	.226
† 2019 WCC tournament winner As of March 23, 2019; Rankings from AP poll

2018–19 WAC women's basketball standings
	Conf.				Overall
Team	W		L	PCT	W		L	PCT
New Mexico State †	15	–	1	.938	26	–	7	.788
California Baptist*	11	–	5	.688	18	–	12	.600
UT Rio Grande Valley	10	–	6	.625	18	–	15	.545
UMKC	9	–	7	.563	16	–	15	.516
CSU Bakersfield	9	–	7	.563	14	–	17	.452
Utah Valley	8	–	8	.500	14	–	16	.467
Grand Canyon	5	–	11	.313	7	–	20	.259
Seattle	3	–	13	.188	3	–	27	.100
Chicago State	2	–	14	.125	2	–	28	.067
† 2019 WAC tournament winner As of March 23, 2019; Rankings from AP poll *California Baptist ineligible for WAC tournament as part of reclassification from Division II

== Award winners ==
=== All-America teams ===
The NCAA has never recognized a consensus All-America team in women's basketball. This differs from the practice in men's basketball, in which the NCAA uses a combination of selections by the Associated Press (AP), the National Association of Basketball Coaches (NABC), the Sporting News, and the United States Basketball Writers Association (USBWA) to determine a consensus All-America team. The selection of a consensus team is possible because all four organizations select at least a first and second team, with only the USBWA not selecting a third team.

Before the 2017–18 season, it was impossible for a consensus women's All-America team to be determined because the AP had been the only body that divided its women's selections into separate teams. The USBWA first named separate teams in 2017–18. The women's counterpart to the NABC, the Women's Basketball Coaches Association (WBCA), continues the USBWA's former practice of selecting a single 10-member (plus ties) team. The NCAA does not recognize Sporting News as an All-America selector in women's basketball.

=== Major player of the year awards ===
- Wooden Award: Sabrina Ionescu, Oregon
- Naismith Award: Megan Gustafson, Iowa
- Associated Press Player of the Year: Megan Gustafson, Iowa
- Wade Trophy: Sabrina Ionescu, Oregon
- Ann Meyers Drysdale Women's Player of the Year (USBWA): Megan Gustafson, Iowa
- espnW National Player of the Year: Megan Gustafson, Iowa

=== Major freshman of the year awards ===
- USBWA National Freshman of the Year: Rhyne Howard, Kentucky
- WBCA Freshman of the Year: Rhyne Howard, Kentucky
- espnW Freshman of the Year: Rhyne Howard, Kentucky

=== Major coach of the year awards ===
- Associated Press Coach of the Year: Kim Mulkey, Baylor
- Naismith College Coach of the Year: Lisa Bluder, Iowa
- WBCA National Coach of the Year: Kim Mulkey, Baylor
- espnW Coach of the Year: Vic Schaefer, Mississippi State

=== Other major awards ===
- Nancy Lieberman Award (top point guard): Sabrina Ionescu, Oregon
- Ann Meyers Drysdale Award (top shooting guard): Asia Durr, Louisville
- Cheryl Miller Award (top small forward): Bridget Carleton, Iowa State
- Katrina McClain Award (top power forward): Napheesa Collier, UConn
- Lisa Leslie Award (top center): Megan Gustafson, Iowa
- WBCA Defensive Player of the Year: Teaira McCowan, Mississippi State
- Naismith Women's Defensive Player of the Year: Kristine Anigwe, California
- Senior CLASS Award (top senior on and off the court): Megan Gustafson, Iowa
- Maggie Dixon Award (top rookie head coach): Carlos Funchess, Southern
- Academic All-American of the Year (top scholar-athlete): Mikayla Ferenz, Idaho
- Elite 90 Award (top GPA among upperclass players at Final Four): Nicole Benz, Notre Dame and Lauren Cox, Baylor
- Pat Summitt Most Courageous Award: David Six, Hampton head coach

== Coaching changes ==
Several teams changed coaches during and after the season.

Team	Former coach	Interim coach	New coach	Reason
Arkansas–Pine Bluff	Nate Kilbert	Danny Evans	Dawn Brown	Kilbert was relieved of his head coaching duties on January 15 after 6½ seasons at UAPB. Assistant coach Evans was named interim head coach of the Lady Lions for the rest of the season. The school hired Jacksonville assistant Dawn Brown as head coach on May 20.
Arkansas State	Brian Boyer		Matt Daniel	Arkansas State parted ways with Boyer on March 13 after 20 seasons, in which the Red Wolves went 333–287 overall. On March 29, the school hired former Central Arkansas/Marshall head coach Daniel for the job.
Bucknell	Aaron Roussell		Trevor Woodruff	Roussell left Bucknell on April 3 after 7 seasons for the Richmond head coaching job. The school went to the Division III ranks for its new hire, naming Scranton's Trevor Woodruff as their new coach on April 26.
California	Lindsay Gottlieb		Charmin Smith	Gottlieb left Cal on June 12 to become an assistant with the Cleveland Cavaliers, becoming the first women's college head coach ever to join an NBA staff. The Golden Bears promoted their top assistant Smith to head coach on June 21.
Central Michigan	Sue Guevara		Heather Oesterle	Guevara announced her retirement on July 12 after nearly 40 years in coaching and 12 seasons as CMU head coach, finishing as the winningest coach in Chippewas history with a 231–156 record. At the same time, CMU announced that Guevara's top assistant Oesterle was being promoted to head coach.
Charleston	Candice M. Jackson		Robin Harmony	Jackson's contract was not renewed on March 14, ending her 5-year tenure at Charleston with a 39–103 overall record. The Cougars hired Lamar head coach Harmony for the same position on April 19.
East Carolina	Chad Killinger	Nicole Mealing	Kim McNeill	Killinger, who had been named interim head coach after the resignation of Heather Macy in October 2018, himself resigned 11 games into the season, citing health reasons. His top assistant Mealing was then named interim head coach of the Pirates for the remainder of the 2018–19 season. On March 28, ECU hired Hartford head coach McNeill.
Eastern Kentucky	Chrissy Roberts		Samantha Williams	Eastern Kentucky announced on March 3 that Roberts would not be retained as head coach for next season. The Colonels went 122-194 overall during Roberts' 11-season tenure at her alma mater, including going winless in Ohio Valley Conference play this season. EKU hired Louisville assistant Williams as Roberts' replacement on March 27.
Fairleigh Dickinson	Peter Cinella		Angelika Szumilo	Fairleigh Dickinson parted ways with Cinella on March 25 after 12 seasons and a 126–234 overall record. The Knights hired Fordham associate head coach Szumilo for the job on April 26.
Florida A&M	LeDawn Gibson	Kevin Lynum		Gibson was fired on February 12 after 9½ seasons at Florida A&M. At the time of her firing, the Rattlers were 3–20 overall and 1–10 in MEAC conference play. Assistant coach Lynum served as the interim head coach for the rest of the season. On August 21, FAMU removed the interim tag from Lyman and named him head coach.
Georgia Southern	Kip Drown		Anita Howard	Drown's contract with Georgia Southern was not renewed on March 10, ending his 4-year tenure with the team. The Eagles went 32–86 overall, including a last-place finish in conference play this season. On March 27, the school hired Howard from Division II Columbus State University for the head coaching position.
Georgia Tech	MaChelle Joseph		Nell Fortner	Less than a month after placing Joseph on leave for a personnel matter, Georgia Tech fired her on March 26 after 16 seasons. On April 9, Tech hired coaching veteran and ESPN analyst Fortner, whose most recent coaching job had been an 8-season stint at Auburn.
Hartford	Kim McNeill		Morgan Valley	McNeill left Hartord on March 28 after 3 seasons to take the East Carolina head coaching position. The Hawks hired Arizona assistant Morgan Valley as her replacement on April 17.
High Point	DeUnna Hendrix		Chelsea Banbury	Hendrix left High Point on April 23 after 7 seasons for the head coaching job at Miami (Ohio). Florida Gulf Coast assistant Chelsea Banbury was hired as her replacement on May 31.
Hofstra	Krista Kilburn-Steveskey		Danielle Santos Atkinson	Kilburn-Steveskey announced her resignation from Hofstra on March 26 after 13 seasons, leaving as the program's winningest head coach with 211 wins. The school hired Pittsburgh assistant Danielle Santos Atkinson as her replacement on April 15.
Holy Cross	Bill Gibbons	Ann McInerney	Maureen Magarity	Gibbons, who had been suspended by Holy Cross since January 31, 2019 after an internal investigation into a personnel matter, was fired on March 28 after 34 seasons at the school. Assistant coach McInerney, who was named interim head coach of the Crusaders at the time of Gibbons' suspension, remained in that role for the 2019–20 season. On April 14, 2020, the school hired New Hampshire coach Magarity for the full-time job.
Incarnate Word	Christy Smith		Jeff Dow	Smith's contract was not renewed on March 10, ending her 3-year tenure at Incarnate Word. Former UL Monroe coach Jeff Dow was hired as her replacement on April 1.
Lamar	Robin Harmony		Aqua Franklin	Harmony left Lamar on April 19 after 6 seasons for the head coaching job at the College of Charleston. Kansas assistant Aqua Franklin was named her replacement on May 1.
Lipscomb	Greg Brown		Lauren Sumski	Brown was fired on March 8 after 7 seasons at his alma mater, in which the Bisons went 44–164 overall. The school went to the Division III ranks for its new hire, naming Rhodes College head coach Sumski for the job on April 22, making her the first female head coach in the program's history.
LIU	Stephanie Del Preore		Rene Haynes	Del Preore was fired on March 20 after 4 seasons at LIU Brooklyn. On April 23, Duke assistant Haynes was named as the first head coach of the unified LIU women's team.
Louisiana–Monroe	Jeff Dow		Brooks Donald-Williams	Dow announced on February 13 that he will not return next season, ending his 5-year tenure at ULM. On April 9, the Warhawks hired Alabama assistant and former McNeese State coach Brooks Donald-Williams for the job.
Marquette	Carolyn Kieger		Megan Duffy	Kieger left her alma mater on April 3 after five seasons, the last three of which ended in NCAA tournament appearances, for the Penn State opening. On April 10, the Golden Eagles hired Miami-Ohio head coach Duffy for the same position.
Miami (OH)	Megan Duffy		DeUnna Hendrix	Duffy left Miami on April 10 after 2 seasons for the head coaching job at Marquette. The RedHawks hired High Point head coach Hendrix for the job on April 23.
Missouri State	Kellie Harper		Amaka Agugua-Hamilton	Harper left Missouri State on April 8 after 6 seasons to accept the head coaching job at her alma mater, Tennessee. The school hired Michigan State assistant Agugua-Hamilton as her replacement on April 17, making her the first black female head coach for any sport at Missouri State.
North Carolina	Sylvia Hatchell		Courtney Banghart	Hatchell resigned on April 18 after an external review confirmed reports that she had made racially insensitive comments and mismanaged players' medical issues. Hatchell, the only coach with national titles in the AIAW, NAIA, and NCAA, left Chapel Hill with 1,023 wins overall and 751 in 33 seasons with the Tar Heels, including the 1994 NCAA title. The school tabbed Princeton's Courtney Banghart as their new head coach on April 29, officially announcing her the next day.
North Dakota State	Maren Walseth		Jory Collins	Walseth and NDSU mutually agreed to part ways on March 11 after 5 seasons. The Bison went 40–106 overall in Walseth's tenure. Kansas assistant Jory Collins was hired as her replacement on April 29.
Penn State	Coquese Washington		Carolyn Kieger	Washington and Penn State mutually agreed to part ways on March 9 after 12 seasons. The Lady Lions went 209–169 during Washington's tenure, but this season, in which they went 12–18 overall and 5–13 in conference play, was the 5th consecutive season in which the team did not make the NCAA tournament. Penn State hired Kieger away from Marquette on April 3, with a formal announcement on April 5.
Pepperdine	DeLisha Milton-Jones		Kristen Dowling	Milton-Jones left on June 25 after two seasons to become an assistant at Syracuse. The Waves went 32–32 during her tenure, including a 22–12 record and WNIT appearance last season. On July 3, Dowling, who had two past stints as a Waves assistant, was brought back as head coach after seven seasons at local D-III program Claremont–Mudd–Scripps.
Portland	Cheryl Sorensen		Michael Meek	Portland parted ways with Sorensen on March 12 after 5 seasons and an overall record of 33–117. The Pilots went to the Division III ranks, also staying in-state, for its new hire, naming George Fox head coach Michael Meek as the new coach on March 27.
Princeton	Courtney Banghart		Carla Berube	Banghart left after 12 seasons to accept the North Carolina job on April 29. Carla Berube, the head coach at NCAA Division III's Tufts University, was hired as her replacement on May 30.
Rhode Island	Daynia La-Force		Tammi Reiss	Rhode Island fired La-Force on March 12 after 5 seasons, in which the Rams went 46–102 overall. The school hired Syracuse assistant Tammi Reiss as her replacement on April 18.
Richmond	Michael Shafer		Aaron Roussell	Richmond announced on March 10 that Shafer will not return next season, ending his 14-year tenure at Richmond. Shafer leaves as the all-time winningest coach of the program with 223 wins, but never led the Spiders to the NCAA tournament during his tenure. Bucknell head coach Roussell was hired as Richmond's newest head coach on April 3.
St. Francis (PA)	Joe Haigh	Susan Robinson Fruchtl	Keila Whittington	Haigh, who had been on a leave of absence since November 13, announced his resignation on February 1 after 6½ seasons at St. Francis. Robinson-Fruchtl, the school's athletic director and former head coach of the Red Flash from 2007 to 2012, served as interim head coach during Haigh's initial leave, and continued in that role for the rest of the season following his resignation. the school hired Marist assistant Keila Whittington as their new coach on April 24, 2019.
Samford	Mike Morris		Carley Kuhns	Morris announced his retirement on March 18 after 25 seasons on the Samford coaching staff and 17 as head coach, leaving as the program's winningest coach with 279 wins. The Bulldogs went to the Division II ranks for their next hire, naming Valdosta State head coach Kuhns as their new head coach on April 10.
Tennessee	Holly Warlick		Kellie Harper	Warlick was fired on March 27 after 34 seasons at her alma mater—27 as an assistant under Pat Summitt and 7 as head coach. Despite a 172–67 overall record under Warlick, the Lady Vols failed to make the Sweet Sixteen in any of her last three seasons, and finished 7–9 in SEC play this season, their first sub-.500 finish ever in the conference. Missouri State's Kellie Harper, who was a point guard during Tennessee's national championship three-peat from 1996 to 1998, was hired as her replacement on April 8.
Texas Southern	Johnetta Hayes		Cynthia Cooper-Dyke	Hayes left Texas Southern on April 26 after 6 seasons to accept the head coaching job at UMBC. Hall of Famer Cynthia Cooper-Dyke, who coached the Lady Tigers during the 2012–13 season, was hired as her replacement on April 30.
UMBC	Phil Stern	Carlee Casidee-Dewey	Johnetta Hayes	Stern, who had been on administrative leave since December 13, announced his resignation from UMBC on February 22 after 16½ seasons. Assistant coach Casidee-Dewey, who served as interim head coach of the Retrievers during Stern's leave, continued in that role for the rest of the season. After the season, the school hired Texas Southern's Johnetta Hayes as his replacement on April 26.
Western Carolina	Stephanie McCormick		Heather Kearney	Western Carolina parted ways with McCormick on March 28 after 4 seasons. Under McCormick, the Catamounts went 23–94 overall, including going winless in conference play this season. After a near 2-month search, the school hired High Point assistant Heather Kearney as head coach on May 16.
Wyoming	Joe Legerski		Gerald Mattinson	The 61-year-old Legerski retired on April 24 after 16 seasons at Wyoming, leaving as the Cowgirls' winningest coach with 314 wins. Wyoming's top assistant Mattinson was named the new head coach on May 7.
Xavier	Brian Neal		Melanie Moore	Neal announced on March 10 that he was stepping down as Xavier head coach after 6 seasons, in which the Musketeers went 76–108 overall and 28–80 in Big East play. On April 5, Michigan associate head coach Moore was named the new Xavier head coach.

== See also ==
- 2018–19 NCAA Division I men's basketball season
