= List of Eastern Kentucky University alumni =

Eastern Kentucky University is a public university in Richmond, Kentucky. Following is a list of some of its notable alumni.

== Athletics ==
Name	Class	Major	Notability	References
Josh Anderson	Non-degreed		Professional baseball player	
Richie Bancells	1981	M.S. sports science	Head athletic trainer for the Baltimore Orioles	
Yeremiah Bell	2002		Professional football player with Miami Dolphins, New York Jets, Arizona Cardinals	
Joanna Bernabei-McNamee	1999	M.S. sports administration	Head coach for Boston College Eagles women's basketball	
Steve Bird	1983		Professional football player and football special teams coordinator for South Carolina State	
Elmo Boyd			Professional football player with the San Francisco 49ers and Green Bay Packers	
Chad Bratzke	1994		Professional football player with the New York Giants and Indianapolis Colts	
Wally Chambers	1973		Professional football player with the Chicago Bears and Tampa Bay Buccaneers; 1973 Defensive NFL Rookie of the Year Award	
Al Clark			Professional baseball umpire	
Earle Combs	1919	Education	Professional baseball player with the New York Yankees, member of the Baseball Hall of Fame	
Danny Copeland	1989		Professional footaball player with the Washington Redskins and Super Bowl XXVI champions	
Dale Dawson			Professional football player with the Minnesota Vikings, Philadelphia Eagles, and Green Bay Packers	
Jessamyn Duke			Professional mixed martial artist formally for the UFC	
Jason Dunn	1995		Professional football player with the Kansas City Chiefs	
Matt Figger	1995		College basketball coach	
Charlie Fisher		M.S.	College football coach	
George Floyd	1982		Profesesional football player with the New York Jets and member of the College Football Hall of Fame	
Christian Friedrich	2008		Professional baseball player with the Colorado Rockies and the San Diego Padres	
Simon B. Gray		M.S. sports administration	Athletic director of Niagara University	
Myron Guyton	1989		Professional football player with the New York Giants and New England Patriots	
Ole Hesselbjerg	2015	Physics	Runner who competed in the 3000 metres steeplechase at the 2016 Summer Olympics for Denmark	
Sam Holbrook			Major League Baseball umpire	
Chris Isaac	1981		Professional gridiron football player with the Canadian Football League	
John Jackson	1988		Professional football player with the Pittsburgh Steelers	
Aaron Jones	1988		Professional football player with the Pittsburgh Steelers, New England Patriots, and Miami Dolphins	
Roy Kidd	1955		College football coach and member of the College Football Hall of Fame	
W. H. Lyon			College football coach	
Antwaun Molden	2008		Professional football player with the Houston Texans	
Mark Montgomery	1992		College softball head coach	
Tom Riginos	1993	M.A. physical education and sports administration	Head baseball coach of the Winthrop Eagles	
Chrissy Roberts	1998		College basketball coach	
Dallas Robinson	2006		Bobsledder in the 2014 Winter Olympics	
Michael Scot		M.A. physical education	Director of the New South Wales Institute of Sport and chief executive officer of Sport New Zealand	
Garfield Smith	1968		Professional basketball player with the Boston Celtics and the San Diego Conquistadors	
Steve Smith		M.S.	Head basketball coach at Oak Hill Academy	
Corey Walden	2015		Professional basketball player, 2019 Israeli Basketball Premier League MVP	

- Javontae Hawkins (born 1993), basketball player in the Israeli Basketball Premier League

== Business ==
Name	Class	Major	Notability	References
Don McNay	1981	Journalism and political science	Chartered financial consultant, financial author, and The Huffington Post contributor	

== Education ==
Name	Class	Major	Notability	References
Lori Stewart Gonzalez		Communication disorders	23rd president of Ohio University	
Kishonna Gray	2005, 2007	Criminal justice, M.S. justice studies	Researcher in communication and gender studies at the University of Kentucky College of Arts and Sciences	
Teresa W. Haynes	1975, 1978, 1984	B.S. and M.A. mathematics and education, M.S. mathematics	Professor of mathematics and statistics at East Tennessee State University known for her research in graph theory	
Don Showalter	1964	Chemistry and math	Professor emeritus and former chairman of the department of chemistry at the University of Wisconsin–Stevens Point	
Aaron Thompson	1978	Political science and sociology	President of the Kentucky Council on Postsecondary Education	

== Entertainment ==
Name	Class	Major	Notability	References
Chuckie Campbell	2007	M.A. English literature and creative writing	Rapper, poet, and author	
Sam Champion	1983	Broadcast news	Weather editor and anchor for Good Morning America and ABC News	
Mallory Ervin		Political science	Miss Kentucky 2009 and The Amazing Race contestant	
Faith Esham	Non-degreed	M.S. clinical psychology	Opera singer	
Carl Hurley	1966	B.S. and M.A. education	Comedian and motivational speaker; former EKU professor	
Laura Kirkpatrick	Non-degreed	Art	America's Next Top Model cycle 13 runner-up	
Homer Ledford	1954		Bluegrass musician and maker of dulcimers	
Tom Luginbill	1996	Sociology	College football analyst for ESPN	
Lee Majors	1962	History and physical education	Actor known for Six Million Dollar Man and The Fall Guy	
Dan Patrick	Non-degreed		Co-host of ESPN's SportsCenter	

== Law ==
Name	Class	Major	Notability	References
Tom Colbert	1976	M.A.	Justice of the Oklahoma Supreme Court	
Pleas Jones		Education	Associate justice of the Kentucky Court of Appeals (subsequently renamed the Kentucky Supreme Court)	
James E. Keller	1966		Justice on the Kentucky Supreme Court	
Debra H. Lambert	1983		Associate justice of the Kentucky Supreme Court and former judge on the Kentucky Court of Appeals	
Danny C. Reeves	1978		Chief United States district judge of the United States District Court for the Eastern District of Kentucky	
Gregory N. Stivers	1982		Chief United States district judge of the United States District Court for the Western District of Kentucky	

== Literature and journalism ==
Name	Class	Major	Notability	References
Gwenda Bond		Journalism	Novelist	
Silas House		English	Novelist	
John Samples	1978	Political science and government	Author, political theorist, and vice president of the Cato Institute	
Crystal Wilkinson	1985	Journalist	Writer, poet, educator, and winner of the Ernest J. Gaines Award for Literary Excellence	

== Military ==
Name	Class	Major	Notability	References
Ken Keen	1974	Mathematics	Lt. general and military deputy commander of United States Southern Command	
Jeffrey H. Norwitz	1974	Law enforcement	Counter-terrorism and law enforcement officer with the Naval Criminal Investigative Service and John Nicholas Brown Chair of Counterterrorism at the Naval War College	
Craig E. Williams		Philosophy	Vietnam War Army veteran and co-founder of the Vietnam Veterans of America Foundation	

== Politics ==
Name	Class	Major	Notability	References
Bob Babbage	1973	Journalism and political science	Kentucky state auditor and Kentucky secretary of state	
J. C. W. Beckham	Non-degreed		Governor of Kentucky and United States senator	
Elmer Begley			Secretary of state of Kentucky	
Leila Feltner Begley			Secretary of state of Kentucky	
Larry Belcher			Kentucky House of Representatives	
Linda H. Belcher		Elementary education	Kentucky House of Representatives	
Josh Branscum	2007	Construction management	Kentucky House of Representatives	
Josh Bray		Business administration	Kentucky House of Representatives	
Dwight Butler			Kentucky House of Representatives	
Josh Calloway		Certificate health and safety	Kentucky House of Representatives	
John Carney		Master	Kentucky House of Representatives	
Jared Carpenter	2000		Kentucky Senate	
Jack Coleman			Kentucky House of Representatives and city commissioner of Harrodsburg, Kentucky	
Carl Day			Kentucky House of Representatives	
Clyde Evans		Master	Ohio House of Representatives	
Danny Ford	1974		Kentucky House of Representatives	
Deanna Frazier	1991	Communication disorders	Kentucky House of Representatives	
Terry Goodin	1989		Indiana House of Representatives	
J. Dudley Goodlette	1970	Political science	United States House of Representatives	
Mike Harmon		Math, statistics, and theater	Kentucky House of Representatives and Kentucky Auditor of Public Accounts	
Kim King	2004	Fitness and wellness management	Kentucky House of Representatives	
Ashley Tackett Laferty			Kentucky House of Representatives	
C. Ed Massey	1989	Criminal justice and police science	Kentucky House of Representatives	
Bobby McCool	1991	Education	Kentucky House of Representatives	
Frances Jones Mills			Kentucky House of Representatives and Kentucky state treasurer	
Virgil Moore	1961	Mathematics	Kentucky Senate	
C. Wesley Morgan		Accounting	Kentucky House of Representatives	
Rick Nelson	1988	M.A.	Kentucky House of Representatives	
Steve Pence	1976, 1978	Business education, M.S. business management	Lieutenant governor of Kentucky	
Darryl M. Scott		Business administration	Delaware House of Representatives	
Thaksin Shinawatra	1975	Criminal justice	Prime minister of Thailand	
Kevin Sinnette	1984		Kentucky House of Representatives	
Liz Stefanics			New Mexico Senate and Santa Fe County Commission	
Brandon J. Storm	2000	Police administration	Kentucky Senate	
Ken Upchurch		Political science	Kentucky House of Representatives	
Alecia Webb-Edgington		M.A. Criminal justice	Kentucky House of Representatives and executive director of the Kentucky Office of Homeland Security	
Steve West	1993	Communications	Kentucky Senate	
Janssen Willhoit	2000		Vermont House of Representatives	

== Science and medicine ==
Name	Class	Major	Notability	References
Eula Bingham	1951	Chemistry and biology	Occupational health scientist	
Ranthony Edmonds	2013	M.S. mathematical sciences	Mathematician specializing in commutative ring theory, factorization theory, and applied algebraic topology	

== Other ==
Name	Class	Major	Notability	References
Andrew C. Thornton II	1971	Law enforcement	Head of "The Company" drug smuggling ring	
