= 2019 SWAC women's basketball tournament =

- Classification: Division I
- Season: 2018–19
- Teams: 8
- Site: Bill Harris Arena; Birmingham, Alabama
- First round site: Campus sites
- Champions: Southern (5th title)
- Winning coach: Carlos Funchess (1st title)
- MVP: Alyric Scott (Southern)
- Television: ESPN3

2018–19 SWAC women's basketball standings
| | Conf. | | | | Overall |
| Team | W | | L | PCT | W | | L | PCT |
|---|---|---|---|---|---|---|---|---|
| Southern † | 14 | – | 4 | .778 | 20 | – | 13 | .606 |
| Prairie View A&M | 13 | – | 5 | .722 | 17 | – | 14 | .548 |
| Jackson State | 12 | – | 6 | .667 | 18 | – | 14 | .563 |
| Grambling State | 12 | – | 6 | .667 | 16 | – | 16 | .500 |
| Texas Southern | 11 | – | 7 | .611 | 15 | – | 15 | .500 |
| Alabama State | 10 | – | 8 | .556 | 11 | – | 19 | .367 |
| Alabama A&M | 8 | – | 10 | .444 | 13 | – | 17 | .433 |
| Mississippi Valley State | 5 | – | 13 | .278 | 6 | – | 24 | .200 |
| Alcorn State | 3 | – | 15 | .167 | 4 | – | 26 | .133 |
| Arkansas-Pine Bluff | 2 | – | 16 | .111 | 5 | – | 20 | .200 |
† 2019 SWAC tournament winner Rankings from AP poll

The 2019 SWAC women's basketball tournament took place March 12–16, 2019. Tournament first-round games were held on campus sites at the higher seed on March 12. The remaining rounds and the semifinals and championship at Bill Harris Arena in Birmingham, Alabama. The winner, Southern, received the Southwestern Athletic Conference's automatic bid to the 2019 NCAA Division I women's basketball tournament.

Unlike most NCAA Division I basketball conference tournaments, the SWAC tournament does not include all of the league's teams. The tournament instead features only the top eight teams from regular-season SWAC play.

Southern won the conference tournament championship game over Jackson State, 45–41.

== Seeds ==
| Seed | School | Conference record | Overall record | Tiebreaker |
|---|---|---|---|---|
| 1 | Southern | 14–4 | 17–12 | |
| 2 | Prairie View A&M | 13–5 | 16–12 | |
| 3 | Jackson State | 12–6 | 16–13 | 2–0 vs. GSU |
| 4 | Grambling State | 12–6 | 15–15 | 0–2 vs. JSU |
| 5 | Texas Southern | 11–7 | 15–14 | |
| 6 | Alabama State | 10–8 | 11–18 | |
| 7 | Alabama A&M | 8–10 | 13–16 | |
| 8 | Mississippi Valley State | 5–13 | 6–23 | |

== Bracket ==
Quarterfinals; Tuesday, March 12
1 | Southern | 51
8 | Mississippi Valley State | 44
4 | Grambling State | 72
5 | Texas Southern | 61
3 | Jackson State | 75
6 | Alabama State | 59
2 | Prairie View A&M | 69
7 | Alabama A&M | 56

Semifinals; Friday, March 15; ESPN3
1 | Southern | 71
4 | Grambling | 69
3 | Jackson State | 75**
2 | Prairie View A&M | 63

Championship; Saturday, March 16; ESPN3, 1:30 p.m.
1 | Southern | 45
3 | Jackson State | 41

**Denotes the number of overtimes played (double overtime)

== See also ==
- 2019 SWAC men's basketball tournament
