= 2018–19 Texas–Rio Grande Valley Vaqueros women's basketball team =

Intercollegiate basketball season

2018–19 Texas–Rio Grande Valley Vaqueros women's basketball
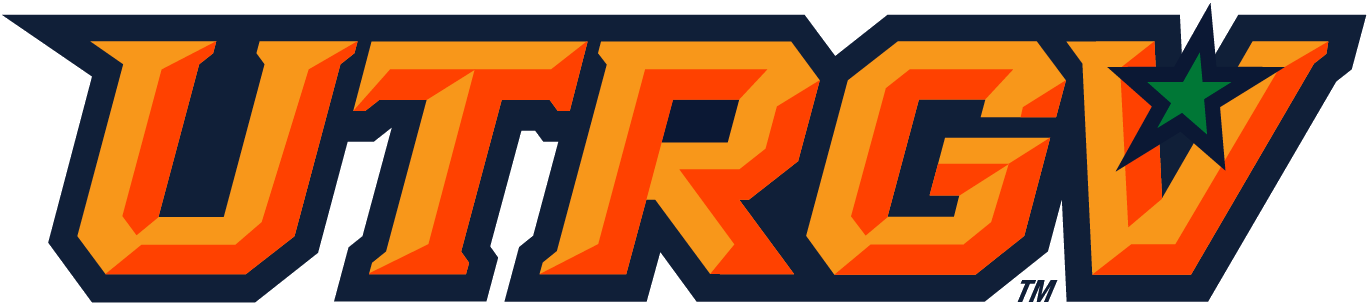

UTRGV Fall Classic Champions

WBI, first round
- Conference: Western Athletic Conference
- Record: 18–15 (10–6 WAC)
- Head coach: Lane Lord (1st season)
- Assistant coaches: Anna Nimz; Ipek Turkyilmaz; Blake Huber
- Home arena: UTRGV Fieldhouse

2018–19 WAC women's basketball standings
	Conf.				Overall
Team	W		L	PCT	W		L	PCT
New Mexico State †	15	–	1	.938	26	–	7	.788
California Baptist*	11	–	5	.688	18	–	12	.600
UT Rio Grande Valley	10	–	6	.625	18	–	15	.545
UMKC	9	–	7	.563	16	–	15	.516
CSU Bakersfield	9	–	7	.563	14	–	17	.452
Utah Valley	8	–	8	.500	14	–	16	.467
Grand Canyon	5	–	11	.313	7	–	20	.259
Seattle	3	–	13	.188	3	–	27	.100
Chicago State	2	–	14	.125	2	–	28	.067
† 2019 WAC tournament winner As of March 23, 2019; Rankings from AP poll *California Baptist ineligible for WAC tournament as part of reclassification from Division II

The 2018–19 Texas–Rio Grande Valley Vaqueros women's basketball team represented the University of Texas Rio Grande Valley (UTRGV) during the 2018–19 NCAA Division I women's basketball season. This was head coach Lane Lord's first season along with the third under the UTRGV label. The Vaqueros played their home games at the UTRGV Fieldhouse in Edinburg, Texas and were members of the Western Athletic Conference (WAC). They finished 18–15 overall, 10–6 in WAC play, to finish in third place. They advanced to the championship game of the WAC women's tournament where they lost New Mexico State. They received an invitation of the WBI where they lost to North Texas in the first round.

== Roster ==
2018–19 UTRGV Vaqueros women's basketball team
Players
Coaches

Pos.	#	Name	Height	Year	Previous school	Hometown
G	1	Amara Graham	5 ft 6 in (1.68 m)	RS So	Gwendolyn Brooks College Prep	Chicago, IL
G	3	Daniela Azubell	5 ft 7 in (1.7 m)	RS Sr	Robert Vela	Edinburg, TX
G	4	Idil Türk	5 ft 9 in (1.75 m)	Sr	Bodwell	Istanbul, Turkey
G	5	Jameka Dowell	5 ft 8 in (1.73 m)	Sr	Lebanon	Lebanon, TN
G	10	Valeria Tapia	5 ft 7 in (1.7 m)	So	Saint Joseph Academy	Matamoros, Mexico
G	11	Quynne Huggins	5 ft 11 in (1.8 m)	Sr	Millennium; Mesa CC	Goodyear, AZ
G	12	Shaiann Tramble	5 ft 7 in (1.7 m)	RS Jr	Shawnee; Highland CC	Shawnee, OK
G	15	Nichele Hyman	5 ft 10 in (1.78 m)	Sr	Clovis	Clovis, NM
F	21	Krisynthia Sampson	6 ft 0 in (1.83 m)	Sr	South Mountain; Arizona Western College	Phoenix, AZ
G	22	Ashlei Lopez (redshirt)	5 ft 8 in (1.73 m)	So	Rockford Lutheran; Morehead State	Rockford, IL
F	23	Makaela Mosley	6 ft 0 in (1.83 m)	Jr	Wylie; Paris JC	Abilene, TX
G	24	Natalia Ready	5 ft 10 in (1.78 m)	RS Jr	Parkview; Fort Scott CC	Little Rock, AR
F	32	Madison Northcutt	5 ft 11 in (1.8 m)	RS Sr	Wichita South; Pittsburg State	Wichita, KS
F	34	Megan Johnson	5 ft 10 in (1.78 m)	Jr	St. Francis Xavier College	Newcastle, Australia

Head coach

- Lane Lord (Tabor)

Assistant coach(es)

- Anna Nimz (Pittsburg State)
- Ipek Turkyilmaz (Arizona)
- Blake Huber (Pittsburg State)

Legend

- (C) Team captain
- (S) Suspended
- (I) Ineligible
- (W) Walk-on
- Injured
- Current redshirt

Roster
Last update: September 10, 2024

== Schedule ==
Date time, TV	Rank^{#}	Opponent^{#}	Result	Record	Site (attendance) city, state
Non-conference regular season
November 10, 2018*; 7:00 p.m.		Texas Lutheran	W 82–38	1–0	UTRGV Fieldhouse (495); Edinburg, TX
November 12, 2018*; 7:00 p.m.		Texas A&M–Corpus Christi; South Texas Showdown	L 49–59	1–1	UTRGV Fieldhouse (418); Edinburg, TX
November 14, 2018*; 7:00 p.m.		at UTSA	L 58–61	1–2	Convocation Center (353); San Antonio, TX
November 17, 2018*; 12:00 p.m., ESPN3		at Canisius	W 57–53	2–2	Koessler Athletic Center (1,540); Buffalo, NY
November 20, 2018*; 6:00 p.m., ESPN+		at Massachusetts	L 70–74	2–3	Mullins Center (413); Amherst, MA
November 25, 2018*; 2:00 p.m.		St. Thomas	W 74–43	3–3	UTRGV Fieldhouse (276); Edinburg, TX
November 30, 2018*; 7:00 p.m.		Prairie View A&M; UTRGV Fall Classic	W 57–50	4–3	UTRGV Fieldhouse (328); Edinburg, TX
December 1, 2018*; 7:00 p.m.		Louisiana; UTRGV Fall Classic	W 75–60	5–3	UTRGV Fieldhouse (390); Edinburg, TX
December 4, 2018*; 7:00 p.m.		at Texas A&M–Corpus Christi; South Texas Showdown	W 70–57	6–3	American Bank Center (589); Corpus Christi, TX
December 8, 2018*; 2:00 p.m.		Texas Southern	L 55–69	6–4	UTRGV Fieldhouse (461); Edinburg, TX
December 20, 2018*; 7:00 p.m.		No. 12 Texas	L 66–81	6–5	UTRGV Fieldhouse (2,655); Edinburg, TX
December 29, 2018*; 12:00 p.m.		at No. 23 Texas A&M	L 61–84	6–6	Reed Arena (3,748); College Station, TX
December 31, 2018*; 12:00 p.m.		at No. 8 Baylor	L 37–98	6–7	Ferrell Center (5,047); Waco, TX
WAC regular season
January 5, 2019; 7:00 p.m.		California Baptist	W 60–56	7–7 (1–0)	UTRGV Fieldhouse (342); Edinburg, TX
January 10, 2019; 9:00 p.m.		at Cal State Bakersfield	L 63–68	7–8 (1–1)	Icardo Center (419); Bakersfield, CA
January 12, 2019; 3:00 p.m.		at Grand Canyon	W 66–50	8–8 (2–1)	GCU Arena (952); Phoenix, AZ
January 17, 2019; 7:00 p.m.		Utah Valley	L 55–57	8–9 (2–2)	UTRGV Fieldhouse (510); Edinburg, TX
January 19, 2019; 7:00 p.m.		Seattle	W 69–56	9–9 (3–2)	UTRGV Fieldhouse (604); Edinburg, TX
January 26, 2019; 3:00 p.m.		at New Mexico State	L 63–71	9–10 (3–3)	Pan American Center (968); Las Cruces, NM
February 2, 2019; 2:00 p.m.		at UMKC	W 75–56	10–10 (4–3)	Swinney Recreation Center (605); Kansas City, MO
February 4, 2019; 7:00 p.m.		at Chicago State	W 71–55	11–10 (5–3)	Jones Convocation Center; Chicago, IL
February 7, 2019; 7:00 p.m.		Grand Canyon	W 49–42	12–10 (6–3)	UTRGV Fieldhouse (419); Edinburg, TX
February 9, 2019; 7:00 p.m.		Cal State Bakersfield	W 64–56	13–10 (7–3)	UTRGV Fieldhouse (522); Edinburg, TX
February 14, 2019; 8:00 p.m.		at Seattle	W 74–70 ^{OT}	14–10 (8–3)	Redhawk Center (240); Seattle, WA
February 16, 2019; 4:00 p.m.		at Utah Valley	L 57–72	14–11 (8–4)	Lockhart Arena (311); Orem, UT
February 23, 2019; 7:00 p.m.		New Mexico State	L 67–70	14–12 (8–5)	UTRGV Fieldhouse (535); Edinburg, TX
February 28, 2019; 7:00 p.m.		Chicago State	W 84–38	15–12 (9–5)	UTRGV Fieldhouse (565); Edinburg, TX
March 2, 2019; 7:00 p.m.		UMKC	W 67–64	16–12 (10–5)	UTRGV Fieldhouse (586); Edinburg, TX
March 7, 2019; 8:00 p.m.		at California Baptist	L 63–66	16–13 (10–6)	CBU Events Center (342); Riverside, CA
WAC women's tournament
March 13, 2019; 8:00 p.m., ESPN3	(2)	vs. (7) Seattle; Quarterfinals	W 56–54	17–13	Orleans Arena; Paradise, NV
March 15, 2019; 4:30 p.m., ESPN3	(2)	vs. (3) Cal State Bakersfield; Semifinals	W 69–58	18–13	Orleans Arena (1,426); Paradise, NV
March 16, 2019; 4:00 p.m., ESPN3	(2)	vs. (1) New Mexico State; Championship game	L 73–76 ^{2OT}	18–14	Orleans Arena; Paradise, NV
WBI
March 20, 2019*; 7:00 p.m.		at North Texas; First round	L 42–56	18–15	The Super Pit (389); Denton, TX
*Non-conference game. ^{#}Rankings from AP poll. (#) Tournament seedings in parentheses. All times are in Central.

== See also ==
- 2018–19 Texas–Rio Grande Valley Vaqueros men's basketball team
