= 2018–19 Southern Lady Jaguars basketball team =

Women's college basketball season

2018–19 Southern Lady Jaguars basketball
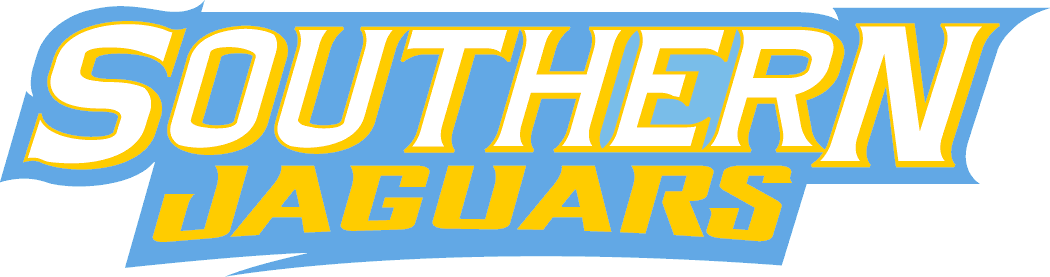

SWAC Regular Season Champions SWAC tournament champions

NCAA tournament, first round
- Conference: Southwestern Athletic Conference
- Record: 20–13 (14–4 SWAC)
- Head coach: Carlos Funchess (1st season)
- Assistant coaches: Jeremy Bonin; Marjorie Cotton; T. J. Pugh; Adrian Sanders
- Home arena: F. G. Clark Center

2018–19 SWAC women's basketball standings
	Conf.				Overall
Team	W		L	PCT	W		L	PCT
Southern †	14	–	4	.778	20	–	13	.606
Prairie View A&M	13	–	5	.722	17	–	14	.548
Jackson State	12	–	6	.667	18	–	14	.563
Grambling State	12	–	6	.667	16	–	16	.500
Texas Southern	11	–	7	.611	15	–	15	.500
Alabama State	10	–	8	.556	11	–	19	.367
Alabama A&M	8	–	10	.444	13	–	17	.433
Mississippi Valley State	5	–	13	.278	6	–	24	.200
Alcorn State	3	–	15	.167	4	–	26	.133
Arkansas-Pine Bluff	2	–	16	.111	5	–	20	.200
† 2019 SWAC tournament winner Rankings from AP poll

The 2018–19 Southern Lady Jaguars basketball team represented Southern University during the 2018–19 NCAA Division I women's basketball season. The Lady Jaguars, led by first year head coach Carlos Funchess, played their home games at the F. G. Clark Center, as members of the Southwestern Athletic Conference. They finished the season 20–13, 14–4 in SWAC play to win the SWAC regular season championship. They also won the SWAC women's tournament, earning them an automatic bid to the NCAA women's tournament. They were seeded sixteenth, and lost to No. 1 seed Mississippi State in the first round.

== Roster ==
2018–19 Southern Lady Jaguars women's basketball team
Players
Coaches

Pos.	#	Name	Height	Year	Previous school	Hometown
G	1	Li'Neshon Legard	5 ft 5 in (1.65 m)	So	Hammond	Hammond, LA
G	2	Alyric Scott	5 ft 11 in (1.8 m)	So	Richton	Richton, MS
G	3	Brittany Rose	5 ft 8 in (1.73 m)	Jr	Lanier; Copiah–Lincoln CC	Jackson, MS
G	4	Skylar O'Bear	5 ft 7 in (1.7 m)	Sr	White Castle	White Castle, LA
G	5	Danayea Charles	5 ft 6 in (1.68 m)	Sr	Helen Cox	New Orleans, LA
G	11	Rishonti Cowart	5 ft 10 in (1.78 m)	Sr	Nova	Fort Lauderdale, FL
G	12	Courtney Parson	5 ft 7 in (1.7 m)	Sr	Dillard	Fort Lauderdale, FL
G	20	Amani Mcwain	5 ft 7 in (1.7 m)	Fr	Ruston	Ruston, LA
F	22	Taneara Moore	6 ft 0 in (1.83 m)	Fr	St. Frances	Baltimore, MD
G	24	Jaden Towner	5 ft 9 in (1.75 m)	Jr	Westlake	Westlake, LA
C	32	Ceundra McGhee	6 ft 3 in (1.91 m)	Fr	Terry	Terry, MS
C	34	Kennedi Lofton	6 ft 2 in (1.88 m)	So	Port Arthur Memorial	Port Arthur, TX
C	35	Cailain Williams	6 ft 1 in (1.85 m)	Fr	Southern University Lab	Baton Rouge, LA
C	42	Briana Thompson	6 ft 2 in (1.88 m)	So	East Saint John	LaPlace, LA

Head coach

- Carlos Funchess (Louisiana–Monroe)

Assistant coach(es)

- Jeremy Bonin
- Marjorie Cotton (Mississippi)
- T. J. Pugh
- Adrian Sanders (Southern)

Legend

- (C) Team captain
- (S) Suspended
- (I) Ineligible
- (W) Walk-on
- Injured
- Current redshirt

Roster

== Schedule and results ==
Date time, TV	Rank^{#}	Opponent^{#}	Result	Record	Site (attendance) city, state
Non-conference regular season
Nov 6, 2018*; 5:30 pm		Millsaps College	W 71–36	1–0	F. G. Clark Center (321); Baton Rouge, LA
Nov 8, 2018*; 6:00 pm		Wiley College	W 89–58	2–0	F. G. Clark Center (421); Baton Rouge, LA
Nov 11, 2018*; 6:00 pm		at Kentucky	L 41–91	2–1	Memorial Coliseum (3,870); Lexington, KY
Nov 15, 2018*; 6:00 pm, FSSW		at No. 4 Baylor	L 49–94	2–2	Ferrell Center (4,747); Waco, TX
Nov 19, 2018*; 5:30 pm		South Alabama	L 49–53	2–3	F. G. Clark Center (175); Baton Rouge, LA
Nov 29, 2018*; 5:30 pm		Dillard	L 61–63	2–4	F. G. Clark Center (129); Baton Rouge, LA
Dec 7, 2018*; 7:00 pm		at Arizona	L 47–69	2–5	Wells Fargo Arena (1,674); Tempe, AZ
Dec 10, 2018*; 5:30 pm		Louisiana College	W 77–53	3–5	F. G. Clark Center (135); Baton Rouge, LA
Dec 16, 2018*; 1:00 pm		at TCU	L 40–69	3–6	Schollmaier Arena (1,806); Fort Worth, TX
Dec 18, 2018*; 12:00 pm		at Texas Tech	L 58–76	3–7	United Supermarkets Arena (8,613); Lubbock, TX
Dec 21, 2018*; 1:00 pm		at Michigan	L 35–76	3–8	Crisler Center (1,928); Ann Arbor, MI
SWAC regular season
Jan 5, 2019; 3:00 pm		Prairie View A&M	L 54–55	3–9 (0–1)	F. G. Clark Center (481); Baton Rouge, LA
Jan 7, 2019; 5:30 pm		Texas Southern	W 63–61	4–9 (1–1)	F. G. Clark Center (309); Baton Rouge, LA
Jan 12, 2019; 3:00 pm		at Grambling State	W 86–81	5–9 (2–1)	Fredrick C. Hobdy Assembly Center (1,280); Grambling, LA
Jan 14, 2019; 5:30 pm		at Jackson State	W 76–74	6–9 (3–1)	Williams Assembly Center (235); Jackson, LA
Jan 19, 2019; 3:00 pm		Arkansas–Pine Bluff	W 73–41	7–9 (4–1)	F. G. Clark Center (541); Baton Rouge, LA
Jan 21, 2019; 5:30 pm		Mississippi Valley State	W 74–67	8–9 (5–1)	F. G. Clark Center (650); Baton Rouge, LA
Jan 26, 2019; 4:00 pm		at Alabama A&M	W 54–50	9–9 (6–1)	Elmore Gymnasium (899); Huntsville, AL
Jan 28, 2019; 5:30 pm		at Alabama State	L 61–78	9–10 (6–2)	Dunn–Oliver Acadome (1,108); Montgomery, AL
Feb 2, 2019; 3:00 pm		at Alcorn State	W 75–54	10–10 (7–2)	Davey Whitney Complex (748); Lorman, MS
Feb 9, 2019; 5:30 pm		Grambling State	W 71–65	11–10 (8–2)	F. G. Clark Center (2,235); Baton Rouge, LA
Feb 11, 2019; 5:30 pm		Jackson State	L 52–59	11–11 (8–3)	F. G. Clark Center (1,625); Baton Rouge, LA
Feb 16, 2019; 5:00 pm		at Arkansas–Pine Bluff	W 56–45	12–11 (9–3)	K. L. Johnson Complex (835); Pine Bluff, AR
Feb 18, 2019; 5:30 pm		at Mississippi Valley State	W 67–46	13–11 (10–3)	Harrison HPER Complex (2,078); Itta Bena, MS
Feb 23, 2019; 3:00 pm		Alabama A&M	W 68–60	14–11 (11–3)	F. G. Clark Center (480); Baton Rouge, LA
Feb 25, 2019; 5:30 pm		Alabama State	W 62–52	15–11 (12–3)	F. G. Clark Center (1,050); Baton Rouge, LA
Mar 2, 2019; 3:00 pm		Alcorn State	W 51–39	16–11 (13–3)	F. G. Clark Center (1,195); Baton Rouge, LA
Mar 7, 2019; 5:30 pm		at Prairie View A&M	L 52–63	16–12 (13–4)	William Nicks Building (432); Prairie View, TX
Mar 9, 2019; 5:30 pm		at Texas Southern	W 60–49	17–12 (14–4)	H&PE Arena (834); Houston, TX
SWAC Women's Tournament
Mar 12, 2019; 7:00 pm	(1)	(8) Mississippi Valley State; Quarterfinals	W 51–44	18–12	F. G. Clark Center (2,180); Baton Rouge, LA
Mar 15, 2019; 12:00 pm, ESPN3	(1)	vs. (4) Grambling State; Semifinals	W 71–69	19–12	Bill Harris Arena (843); Birmingham, AL
Mar 16, 2019; 1:30 pm, ESPN3	(1)	vs. (3) Jackson State; Championship Game	W 45–41	20–12	Bill Harris Arena (724); Birmingham, AL
NCAA Women's Tournament
Mar 22, 2019*; 8:30 pm, ESPN2	(16 P)	at (1 P) No. 4 Mississippi State; First Round	L 46–103	20–13	Humphrey Coliseum (9,967); Starkville, MS
*Non-conference game. ^{#}Rankings from AP Poll. (#) Tournament seedings in parentheses. P=Portland Region. All times are in Eastern Time.

== See also ==
2018–19 Southern Jaguars basketball team
