= 2018–19 New Mexico State Aggies women's basketball team =

Intercollegiate basketball season

2018–19 New Mexico State Aggies women's basketball

WAC regular-season & tournament champions

NCAA tournament, first round
- Conference: Western Athletic Conference
- Record: 26–7 (15–1 WAC)
- Head coach: Brooke Atkinson (2nd season)
- Assistant coaches: Ryan McAdams; Aisha Stewart; DeAudra Brown
- Home arena: Pan American Center

2018–19 WAC women's basketball standings
	Conf.				Overall
Team	W		L	PCT	W		L	PCT
New Mexico State †	15	–	1	.938	26	–	7	.788
California Baptist*	11	–	5	.688	18	–	12	.600
UT Rio Grande Valley	10	–	6	.625	18	–	15	.545
UMKC	9	–	7	.563	16	–	15	.516
CSU Bakersfield	9	–	7	.563	14	–	17	.452
Utah Valley	8	–	8	.500	14	–	16	.467
Grand Canyon	5	–	11	.313	7	–	20	.259
Seattle	3	–	13	.188	3	–	27	.100
Chicago State	2	–	14	.125	2	–	28	.067
† 2019 WAC tournament winner As of March 23, 2019; Rankings from AP poll *California Baptist ineligible for WAC tournament as part of reclassification from Division II

The 2018–19 New Mexico State Aggies women's basketball team represented New Mexico State University during the 2018–19 NCAA Division I women's basketball season. The Aggies, led by second-year head coach Brooke Atkinson, played their home games at the Pan American Center and were members of the Western Athletic Conference (WAC). They finished the season 26–7, 15–1 in WAC play, to win the WAC regular-season championship. They defeated Chicago State, UMKC and Texas–Rio Grande Valley to be champions of the WAC women's tournament. They received an automatic bid to the NCAA women's tournament where they lost in the first round to Iowa State.

== Roster ==
2018–19 New Mexico State Aggies women's basketball team
Players
Coaches

Pos.	#	Name	Height	Year	Previous school	Hometown
G	0	Pam Wilmore	5 ft 6 in (1.68 m)	So	Centennial HS	Las Vegas, NV
G	1	Rodrea Echols	5 ft 9 in (1.75 m)	Jr	Overton HS	Memphis, TN
G	2	Brooke Salas	5 ft 10 in (1.78 m)	Sr	El Dorado HS	Placentia, CA
G	3	Stabresa McDaniel	5 ft 10 in (1.78 m)	RS Sr	Skyline HS; North Texas	Dallas, TX
F	11	Baylee Robinson	6 ft 1 in (1.85 m)	Sr	Goddard HS; Barton CC	Roswell, NM
F	14	Nana Sule	6 ft 0 in (1.83 m)	Jr	Cedar International; Chipola College	Abuja, Nigeria
G/F	20	Dominique Mills	5 ft 10 in (1.78 m)	Sr	Juan Diego Catholic HS; Trinity Valley	Salt Lake City, UT
G	21	Monique Mills	5 ft 10 in (1.78 m)	Sr	Juan Diego Catholic HS; Trinity Valley	Salt Lake City, UT
G	22	Kalei Atkinson	6 ft 0 in (1.83 m)	So	West HS	Torrance, CA
G	23	Aaliyah Prince	5 ft 8 in (1.73 m)	Jr	Highlands HS	San Antonio, TX
F	24	Adenike Aderinto	6 ft 2 in (1.88 m)	Jr	Dagamas Legacy School; South Georgia Tech	Zaria, Nigeria
F	30	Gia Pack	5 ft 10 in (1.78 m)	Jr	South Mountain HS	Phoenix, AZ
G	34	Tayelin Grays	5 ft 8 in (1.73 m)	Fr	Dayton HS	Dayton, TX
G	34	Aissatou Fall	5 ft 8 in (1.73 m)	Fr	Life Prep Academy	Pikine, Senegal
G		Tatum Henderson (redshirt)	5 ft 10 in (1.78 m)	So	Martin HS; North Texas	Arlington, TX

Head coach

- Brooke Atkinson (Wichita State)

Assistant coach(es)

- Ryan McAdams (Cal Poly)
- Aisha Stewart (Catawba)
- DeAudra Brown (Elizabeth City State)

Legend

- (C) Team captain
- (S) Suspended
- (I) Ineligible
- (W) Walk-on
- Injured
- Current redshirt

Roster
Last update: August 2, 2024

== Schedule ==
Date time, TV	Rank^{#}	Opponent^{#}	Result	Record	Site (attendance) city, state
Non-conference regular season
November 6, 2018*; 5:00 p.m.		UT Permian Basin	W 70–38	1–0	Pan American Center; Las Cruces, NM
November 11, 2018*; 11:00 a.m., ESPN+		at Western Michigan	W 66–54	2–0	University Arena (591); Kalamazoo, MI
November 17, 2018*; 1:00 p.m.		at UTEP; Battle of I-10	W 69–65	3–0	Don Haskins Center (597); El Paso, TX
November 20, 2018*; 6:00 p.m., FSAZ		Abilene Christian	L 46–58	3–1	Pan American Center (676); Las Cruces, NM
November 26, 2018*; 6:00 p.m.		Northern New Mexico	W 101–51	4–1	Pan American Center (702); Las Cruces, NM
December 1, 2018*; 2:00 p.m.		at New Mexico; Rio Grande Rivalry	L 58–83	4–2	Dreamstyle Arena (5,327); Albuquerque, NM
December 11, 2018*; 6:00 p.m., AggieVision		Denver	W 66–64	5–2	Pan American Center; Las Cruces, NM
December 15, 2018*; 2:00 p.m., AggieVision		New Mexico; Rio Grande Rivalry	L 50–75	5–3	Pan American Center (889); Las Cruces, NM
December 18, 2018*; 4:30 p.m.		at Texas A&M–Corpus Christi	W 67–65	6–3	American Bank Center (530); Corpus Christi, TX
December 20, 2018*; 12:00 p.m.		at South Alabama; FIU Holiday Tournament semifinals	L 67–68	6–4	Ocean Bank Convocation Center; Miami, FL
December 21, 2018*; 10:00 a.m.		vs. Alcorn State; FIU Thanksgiving Tournament 3rd-place game	W 82–64	7–4	Ocean Bank Convocation Center; Miami, FL
December 28, 2018*; 8:00 p.m.		at UC Riverside	L 64–65	7–5	SRC Arena (100); Riverside, CA
December 30, 2018*; 3:00 p.m.		at UC Santa Barbara	W 81–73	8–5	The Thunderdome (286); Santa Barbara, CA
WAC regular season
January 3, 2019; 6:00 p.m., AggieVision		California Baptist	W 76–69	9–5 (1–0)	Pan American Center (669); Las Cruces, NM
January 10, 2019; 6:00 p.m.		at Grand Canyon	L 51–54	9–6 (1–1)	GCU Arena (880); Phoenix, AZ
January 12, 2019; 2:00 p.m.		at Cal State Bakersfield	W 61–59	10–6 (2–1)	Icardo Center (607); Bakersfield, CA
January 17, 2019; 6:00 p.m., FSAZ+		Seattle	W 75–55	11–6 (3–1)	Pan American Center (743); Las Cruces, NM
January 19, 2019; 12:00 p.m., FSAZ		Utah Valley	W 58–52	12–6 (4–1)	Pan American Center (857); Las Cruces, NM
January 26, 2019; 2:00 p.m.		Texas–Rio Grande Valley	W 71–63	13–6 (5–1)	Pan American Center (968); Las Cruces, NM
January 31, 2019; 5:00 p.m.		at UMKC	W 90–86	14–6 (6–1)	Swinney Recreation Center (665); Kansas City, MO
February 2, 2019; 11:00 a.m.		at Chicago State	W 87–66	15–6 (7–1)	Jones Convocation Center (110); Chicago, IL
February 7, 2019; 6:00 p.m., FSAZ+		Cal State Bakersfield	W 61–48	16–6 (8–1)	Pan American Center (748); Las Cruces, NM
February 9, 2019; 2:00 p.m., FSAZ+		Grand Canyon	W 81–52	17–6 (9–1)	Pan American Center; Las Cruces, NM
February 14, 2019; 11:00 a.m.		at Utah Valley	W 72–63	18–6 (10–1)	Lockhart Arena (540); Orem, UT
February 16, 2019; 3:00 p.m.		at Seattle	W 83–72	19–6 (11–1)	Redhawk Center (708); Seattle, WA
February 23, 2019; 6:00 p.m.		at Texas–Rio Grande Valley	W 70–67	20–6 (12–1)	UTRGV Fieldhouse (535); Edinburg, TX
February 28, 2019; 6:00 p.m.		UMKC	W 68–61	21–6 (13–1)	Pan American Center (781); Las Cruces, NM
March 2, 2019; 12:00 p.m.		Chicago State	W 77–54	24–6 (16–1)	Pan American Center (754); Las Cruces, NM
March 9, 2019; 2:00 p.m.		at California Baptist	W 92–64	23–6 (15–1)	CBU Events Center (744); Riverside, CA
WAC women's tournament
March 13, 2019; 1:00 p.m.	(1)	vs. (8) Chicago State; Quarterfinals	W 90–54	24–6	Orleans Arena; Paradise, NV
March 15, 2019; 1:00 p.m.	(1)	vs. (4) UMKC; Semifinals	W 91–80 ^{OT}	25–6	Orleans Arena; Paradise, NV
March 16, 2019; 3:00 p.m., ESPN3	(1)	vs. (2) Texas–Rio Grande Valley; Championship game	W 76–73 ^{2OT}	26–6	Orleans Arena; Paradise, NV
NCAA women's tournament
March 23, 2019*; 4:00 p.m., ESPN2	(14 C)	at (3 C) No. 13 Iowa State; First round	L 61–97	26–7	Hilton Coliseum (6,503); Ames, IA
*Non-conference game. ^{#}Rankings from AP poll. (#) Tournament seedings in parentheses. C=Chicago Region. All times are in Mountain.

== See also ==
- 2018–19 New Mexico State Aggies men's basketball team
