= 2019 WAC women's basketball tournament =

2019 Western Athletic Conference women's basketball tournament
- Classification: Division I
- Season: 2018–19
- Teams: 8
- Site: Orleans Arena; Paradise, Nevada
- Champions: New Mexico State (4th title)
- Winning coach: Brooke Atkinson (1st title)
- MVP: Gia Pack (New Mexico State)
- Television: ESPN3

2018–19 WAC women's basketball standings
	Conf.				Overall
Team	W		L	PCT	W		L	PCT
New Mexico State †	15	–	1	.938	26	–	7	.788
California Baptist*	11	–	5	.688	18	–	12	.600
UT Rio Grande Valley	10	–	6	.625	18	–	15	.545
UMKC	9	–	7	.563	16	–	15	.516
CSU Bakersfield	9	–	7	.563	14	–	17	.452
Utah Valley	8	–	8	.500	14	–	16	.467
Grand Canyon	5	–	11	.313	7	–	20	.259
Seattle	3	–	13	.188	3	–	27	.100
Chicago State	2	–	14	.125	2	–	28	.067
† 2019 WAC tournament winner As of March 23, 2019; Rankings from AP poll *California Baptist ineligible for WAC tournament as part of reclassification from Division II

The 2019 WAC women's basketball tournament was a postseason tournament held from March 13–16, 2019, at the Orleans Arena in Paradise, Nevada. New Mexico State won the conference tournament championship game over Texas–Rio Grande Valley, in double-overtime, 76–73 to earn an automatic trip to the NCAA women's tournament.

== Seeds ==
The teams were seeded based on record, with California Baptist not eligible to play due to the transition rules.

2019 WAC Women's Basketball Tournament seeds
Seed	School	Conference	Overall	Tiebreaker
1.	New Mexico State	15–1	26–6	
–	California Baptist	11–5	18–11	
2.	UT Rio Grande Valley	10–6	18–14	
3.	Kansas City	9–7	16–15	
4.	CSU Bakersfield	9–7	14–17	
5.	Utah Valley	8–8	14–16	
6.	Grand Canyon	5–11	7–20	
7.	Seattle U	3–13	3–27	
8.	Chicago State	2–14	2–28	

== Schedule ==
Session	Game	Time*	Matchup^{#}	Television	Attendance
Quarterfinals – Wednesday, March 13
1	1	12:00 PM	#8 Chicago State vs. #1 New Mexico State	ESPN3	811
1	2	2:30 PM	#5 Utah Valley vs. #4 UMKC	ESPN3	811
2	3	6:00 PM	#7 Seattle U vs. #2 Texas–Rio Grande Valley	ESPN3	811
2	4	8:30 PM	#6 Grand Canyon vs. #3 Cal State Bakersfield	ESPN3	811
Semifinals – Friday, March 15
3	5	12:00 PM	#1 New Mexico State vs. #4 UMKC	ESPN3	1,426
3	6	2:30 PM	#2 Texas–Rio Grande Valley vs. #3 Cal State Bakersfield	ESPN3	1,426
Championship Game – Saturday, March 16
4	7	2:00 PM	#1 New Mexico State vs. #2 Texas–Rio Grande Valley	ESPN3	
*Game Times in PT. #-Rankings denote tournament seeding.

== Bracket ==
Quarterfinals; Wednesday, March 13
1	New Mexico State	90
8	Chicago State	54
4	UMKC	78
5	Utah Valley	75
3	Cal St Bakersfield	79
6	Grand Canyon	54
2	UTRGV	56
7	Seattle	54

Semifinals; Friday, March 15
1	New Mexico State	91 OT
4	UMKC	80
3	Cal State Bakersfield	58
2	UTRGV	69

Championship; Saturday, March 16
1	New Mexico State	76 OT 2
2	UTRGV	73
