= 2018–19 California Baptist Lancers women's basketball team =

Intercollegiate basketball season

2018–19 California Baptist Lancers women's basketball
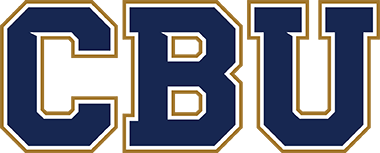

WNIT, First Round
- Conference: Western Athletic Conference
- Record: 18–12 (11–5 WAC)
- Head coach: Jarrod Olson (6th season)
- Assistant coaches: Jessica Case; Angie Ned; Brittany Sepeda
- Home arena: CBU Events Center

2018–19 WAC women's basketball standings
	Conf.				Overall
Team	W		L	PCT	W		L	PCT
New Mexico State †	15	–	1	.938	26	–	7	.788
California Baptist*	11	–	5	.688	18	–	12	.600
UT Rio Grande Valley	10	–	6	.625	18	–	15	.545
UMKC	9	–	7	.563	16	–	15	.516
CSU Bakersfield	9	–	7	.563	14	–	17	.452
Utah Valley	8	–	8	.500	14	–	16	.467
Grand Canyon	5	–	11	.313	7	–	20	.259
Seattle	3	–	13	.188	3	–	27	.100
Chicago State	2	–	14	.125	2	–	28	.067
† 2019 WAC tournament winner As of March 23, 2019; Rankings from AP poll *California Baptist ineligible for WAC tournament as part of reclassification from Division II

The 2018–19 California Baptist Lancers women's basketball team represented California Baptist University during the 2018–19 NCAA Division I women's basketball season. They were led by head coach Jarrod Olson, in his sixth season at California Baptist. The Lancers played their home games at the CBU Events Center in Riverside, California as members of the Western Athletic Conference.

This was CBU's first year of a four-year transition period from Division II to Division I. As a result, the Lancers were not eligible for NCAA postseason play, and would not participate in the WAC tournament. They received an automatic bid to the WNIT, where they were defeated by Pepperdine in the first round.

== Roster ==
2018–19 California Baptist Lancers women's basketball team
Players
Coaches

Pos.	#	Name	Height	Year	Previous school	Hometown
G	3	Ane Olaeta	5 ft 4 in (1.63 m)	So	Gernika-Lumo	Gernika-Lumo, Spain
G/F	4	Lexy Ram	5 ft 10 in (1.78 m)	Jr	Ironwood Ridge	Tucson, AZ
G	5	Maryn Budiman	5 ft 9 in (1.75 m)	Fr	Cloverdale	Surrey, BC
G	10	Georgia Dale	5 ft 6 in (1.68 m)	So	Box Hill Senior	Melbourne, Australia
G	11	Emma Meriggioli	5 ft 6 in (1.68 m)	Sr	Edgewood	Madison, WI
G	12	Delacy Brown	5 ft 7 in (1.7 m)	Jr	Riverside Poly; Mt. San Jacinto College	Perris, CA
G	14	Sydney Palma	5 ft 9 in (1.75 m)	Fr	Boulder Creek	Phoenix, AZ
G	15	Kristine Sellona	5 ft 3 in (1.6 m)	RS Jr	Mater Dei Catholic	San Diego, CA
G	22	Brittany Cedeno	5 ft 8 in (1.73 m)	Fr	South San Francisco	South San Francisco, CA
F	30	Tiena Afu	5 ft 11 in (1.8 m)	Jr	Riverton	Sandy, UT
F	32	Britney Thomas	6 ft 1 in (1.85 m)	Jr	San Jacinto; Mt. San Jacinto College	San Jacinto, CA
F	33	Blaysen Barnadoe	6 ft 0 in (1.83 m)	Sr	Foothill; Santa Ana College	Tustin, CA
F	34	Caitlyn Harper	6 ft 1 in (1.85 m)	Fr	Arrowhead	Hartland, WI

Head coach

- Jarrod Olson (Doane)

Assistant coach(es)

- Jessica Case (Westmont)
- Angie Ned (UC Irvine)
- Brittany Sepeda (Cal Baptist)

Legend

- (C) Team captain
- (S) Suspended
- (I) Ineligible
- (W) Walk-on
- Injured
- Current redshirt

Roster

== Schedule ==
Date time, TV	Rank^{#}	Opponent^{#}	Result	Record	Site (attendance) city, state
Regular season
Nov 6, 2018*; 6:00 pm		Idaho State	L 57–72	0–1	CBU Events Center (1,090); Riverside, CA
Nov 9, 2018*; 7:00 pm		at Long Beach State	W 85–83	1–1	Walter Pyramid (619); Long Beach, CA
Nov 13, 2018*; 6:00 pm		Cal State Fullerton	L 65–79	1–2	CBU Events Center (595); Riverside, CA
Nov 17, 2018*; 6:00 pm		at Northern Arizona	L 88–91	1–3	Rolle Activity Center (588); Flagstaff, AZ
Nov 23, 2018*; 5:00 pm		at San Diego State; SDSU Thanksgiving Classic	L 67–83	1–4	Viejas Arena (703); San Diego, CA
Nov 24, 2018*; 5:00 pm		vs. BYU; SDSU Thanksgiving Classic	L 69–76	1–5	Viejas Arena (822); San Diego, CA
Nov 28, 2018*; 12:00 pm		at Cal State Northridge	L 67–73	1–6	Matadome (1,218); Northridge, CA
Nov 29, 2018*; 6:00 pm		La Sierra	W 91–44	2–6	CBU Events Center (375); Riverside, CA
Dec 6, 2018*; 6:00 pm		UC Riverside	W 65–57	3–6	CBU Events Center (647); Riverside, CA
Dec 8, 2018*; 6:00 pm		Fresno Pacific	W 93–71	4–6	CBU Events Center (407); Riverside, CA
Dec 15, 2018*; 1:00 pm		Notre Dame de Namur	W 80–47	5–6	CBU Events Center (316); Riverside, CA
Dec 19, 2018*; 7:00 pm		at UC Santa Barbara	W 70–64	6–6	The Thunderdome (205); Santa Barbara, CA
Jan 3, 2019; 5:00 pm, FSW		at New Mexico State	L 69–76	6–7 (0–1)	Pan American Center (669); Las Cruces, NM
Jan 5, 2019; 5:00 pm		at Texas–Rio Grande Valley	L 56–60	6–8 (0–2)	UTRGV Fieldhouse (342); Edinburg, TX
Jan 10, 2019; 6:00 pm		UMKC	L 74–78	6–9 (0–3)	CBU Events Center (362); Riverside, CA
Jan 10, 2019; 1:00 pm		Chicago State	W 89–52	7–9 (1–3)	CBU Events Center (382); Riverside, CA
Jan 17, 2019*; 6:00 pm		Westcliff University	W 133–43	8–9	CBU Events Center (463); Riverside, CA
Jan 24, 2019; 7:00 pm		at Cal State Bakersfield	W 68–45	9–9 (2–3)	Icardo Center (423); Bakersfield, CA
Jan 26, 2019; 2:00 pm		at Grand Canyon	L 71–75	9–10 (2–4)	GCU Arena (620); Phoenix, AZ
Jan 31, 2019; 11:00 am		Utah Valley	W 83–54	10–10 (3–4)	CBU Events Center (2,119); Riverside, CA
Feb 2, 2019; 2:00 pm		Seattle	W 100–83	11–10 (4–4)	CBU Events Center (619); Riverside, CA
Feb 7, 2019; 5:00 pm		at Chicago State	W 93–67	12–10 (5–4)	Jones Convocation Center (255); Chicago, IL
Feb 9, 2019; 12:00 pm		at UMKC	W 95–92 ^{2OT}	13–10 (6–4)	Swinney Recreation Center (371); Kansas City, MO
Feb 21, 2019; 6:00 pm		Grand Canyon	W 93–50	14–10 (7–4)	CBU Events Center (687); Riverside, CA
Feb 24, 2019; 4:00 pm		Cal State Bakersfield	W 67–43	15–10 (8–4)	CBU Events Center (348); Riverside, CA
Feb 28, 2019; 6:00 pm		at Seattle	W 86–64	16–10 (5–4)	Redhawk Center (403); Seattle, WA
Mar 2, 2019; 2:00 pm		at Utah Valley	W 92–74	17–10 (10–4)	Lockhart Arena (308); Orem, UT
Mar 7, 2019; 6:00 pm		Texas–Rio Grande Valley	W 66–63	18–10 (11–4)	CBU Events Center (342); Riverside, CA
Mar 9, 2019; 1:00 pm		New Mexico State	L 64–92	18–11 (11–5)	CBU Events Center (744); Riverside, CA
WNIT
Mar 20, 2019*; 5:00 pm		Pepperdine; First Round	L 79–91	18–12	CBU Events Center (833); Riverside, CA
*Non-conference game. ^{#}Rankings from AP Poll. (#) Tournament seedings in parentheses. All times are in Pacific Time.

== See also ==
- 2018–19 California Baptist Lancers men's basketball team
