= 2018–19 Seattle Redhawks women's basketball team =

Intercollegiate basketball season

2018–19 Seattle Redhawks women's basketball
- Conference: Western Athletic Conference
- Record: 3–27 (3–13 WAC)
- Head coach: Suzy Barcomb (3rd season)
- Assistant coaches: Joddie Gleason; Skip Gleason; Toni Thomas
- Home arena: Redhawk Center

2018–19 WAC women's basketball standings
	Conf.				Overall
Team	W		L	PCT	W		L	PCT
New Mexico State †	15	–	1	.938	26	–	7	.788
California Baptist*	11	–	5	.688	18	–	12	.600
UT Rio Grande Valley	10	–	6	.625	18	–	15	.545
UMKC	9	–	7	.563	16	–	15	.516
CSU Bakersfield	9	–	7	.563	14	–	17	.452
Utah Valley	8	–	8	.500	14	–	16	.467
Grand Canyon	5	–	11	.313	7	–	20	.259
Seattle	3	–	13	.188	3	–	27	.100
Chicago State	2	–	14	.125	2	–	28	.067
† 2019 WAC tournament winner As of March 23, 2019; Rankings from AP poll *California Baptist ineligible for WAC tournament as part of reclassification from Division II

The 2018–19 Seattle Redhawks women's basketball team represented Seattle University during the 2018–19 NCAA Division I women's basketball season. The Redhawks, led by third-year head coach Suzy Barcomb, played their home games at the Redhawk Center and were members of the Western Athletic Conference (WAC). They finished the season 3–27, 3–13 in WAC play, to finish in eighth place. They lost in the quarterfinals of the WAC women's tournament to Texas–Rio Grande Valley.

== Roster ==
2018–19 Seattle Redhawks women's basketball team
Players
Coaches

Pos.	#	Name	Height	Year	Previous school	Hometown
G	1	Makenna Schoenhofer	5 ft 10 in (1.78 m)	RS Fr	St. Bernard's Academy	Fortuna, CA
F	2	Hailey Vice-Neat	6 ft 3 in (1.91 m)	So	Cardinal Newman; Boise State	Santa Rosa, CA
G	4	McKenzi Williams	5 ft 5 in (1.65 m)	So	Auburn Riverside	Auburn, WA
G	5	Courtney Murphy	6 ft 0 in (1.83 m)	Fr	Mountain Creek State	Sunshine Coast, Australia
F	11	Georgia Kehoe	6 ft 3 in (1.91 m)	Fr	Stuartholme	Brisbane, Australia
G	12	Carla Bieg	5 ft 6 in (1.68 m)	Jr	Escola Betania-Patmos	Barcelona, Spain
F	14	Leilani Peat	6 ft 0 in (1.83 m)	RS Fr	Corona Del Sol	Tempe, AZ
G	15	Kamira Sanders	5 ft 7 in (1.7 m)	Jr	Enterprise	Redding, CA
G	21	Olivia Crawford	5 ft 6 in (1.68 m)	Jr	Lakes; Hawaii	Lakewood, WA
G	23	Madeline Dopplick	5 ft 7 in (1.7 m)	Sr	Millikan; Mt. San Antonio College	Long Beach, CA
G	24	Sarah Rahon	5 ft 9 in (1.75 m)	Fr	Mater Dei	Orange, CA
C	25	Leilia Orji	6 ft 0 in (1.83 m)	So	Etiwanda	Rancho Cucamonga, CA
G	31	Genessa Bedoya	5 ft 5 in (1.65 m)	Jr	Bishop Alemany	Santa Clarita, CA
F	34	Chinwe Ezeonu	6 ft 1 in (1.85 m)	So	Seattle Prep; San Jose State	Seattle, WA
F	35	Delaney McCann	6 ft 1 in (1.85 m)	RS Sr	Canyon; Humboldt State	Santa Clarita, CA
F/C	43	Joana Alves	6 ft 3 in (1.91 m)	Jr	Escola Secundária Fernão Mendes Pinto	Lisbon, Portugal

Head coach

- Suzy Barcomb (Washington)

Assistant coach(es)

- Joddie Gleason (Chico State)
- Skip Gleason (Chico State)
- Toni Thomas (Cal State Fullerton)

Legend

- (C) Team captain
- (S) Suspended
- (I) Ineligible
- (W) Walk-on
- Injured
- Current redshirt

Roster
Last update: July 24, 2024

== Schedule ==
Date time, TV	Rank^{#}	Opponent^{#}	Result	Record	Site (attendance) city, state
Exhibition
November 2, 2018*; 6:00 p.m.		Northwest University	W 66–58		Redhawk Center (303); Seattle, WA
Non-conference regular season
November 6, 2018*; 6:00 p.m.		Cal State Fullerton	L 54–57	0–1	Redhawk Center (305); Seattle, WA
November 9, 2018*; 5:00 p.m.		Northern Arizona	L 58–65	0–2	Redhawk Center (435); Seattle, WA
November 16, 2018*; 2:00 p.m.		vs. Arizona; Bank of Hawaii Classic	L 54–84	0–3	Stan Sheriff Center; Honolulu, HI
November 18, 2018*; 4:30 p.m.		at Hawaii; Bank of Hawaii Classic	L 51–67	0–4	Stan Sheriff Center; Honolulu, HI
November 24, 2018*; 2:00 p.m.		at Portland State	L 43–68	0–5	Viking Pavilion (334); Portland, OR
November 26, 2018*; 6:00 p.m.		at Utah	L 62–89	0–6	Jon M. Huntsman Center (1,572); Salt Lake City, UT
November 30, 2018*; 6:00 p.m.		Washington	L 58–69	0–7	Redhawk Center (787); Seattle, WA
December 2, 2018*; 2:00 p.m.		Pepperdine	L 64–77	0–8	Redhawk Center (278); Seattle, WA
December 6, 2018*; 7:00 p.m.		at Pacific	L 61–75	0–9	Alex G. Spanos Center (309); Stockton, CA
December 9, 2018*; 1:00 p.m.		at UC Davis	L 59–76	0–10	The Pavilion (572); Davis, CA
December 17, 2018*; 11:00 a.m.		Cal Poly	L 50–60	0–11	Redhawk Center (444); Seattle, WA
December 20, 2018*; 6:30 p.m.		at Nevada	L 54–67	0–12	Lawlor Events Center (864); Reno, NV
December 29, 2018*; 6:30 p.m.		at UC Irvine	L 50–65	0–13	Bren Events Center (421); Irvine, CA
WAC regular season
January 3, 2019; 6:00 p.m.		Cal State Bakersfield	L 60–70	0–14 (0–1)	Redhawk Center (231); Seattle, WA
January 5, 2019; 2:00 p.m.		Grand Canyon	L 73–74 ^{3OT}	0–15 (0–2)	Redhawk Center (328); Seattle, WA
January 12, 2019; 2:00 p.m.		Utah Valley	L 55–58	0–16 (0–3)	Redhawk Center (408); Seattle, WA
January 17, 2019; 5:00 p.m.		at New Mexico State	L 55–75	0–17 (0–4)	Pan American Center (743); Las Cruces, NM
January 19, 2019; 5:00 p.m.		at Texas–Rio Grande Valley	L 56–69	0–18 (0–5)	UTRGV Fieldhouse (604); Edinburg, TX
January 24, 2019; 6:00 p.m.		Chicago State	W 90–54	1–18 (1–5)	Redhawk Center (302); Seattle, WA
January 26, 2019; 2:00 p.m.		UMKC	L 62–86	1–19 (1–6)	Redhawk Center (397); Seattle, WA
February 2, 2019; 2:00 p.m.		at California Baptist	L 83–100	1–20 (1–7)	CBU Events Center (619); Riverside, CA
February 9, 2019; 2:00 p.m.		at Utah Valley	L 56–63	1–21 (1–8)	UCCU Center (225); Orem, UT
February 14, 2019; 6:00 p.m.		Texas–Rio Grande Valley	L 70–74 ^{OT}	1–22 (1–9)	Redhawk Center (240); Seattle, WA
February 16, 2019; 2:00 p.m.		New Mexico State	L 72–83	1–23 (1–10)	Redhawk Center (708); Seattle, WA
February 21, 2019; 4:00 p.m.		at UMKC	L 66–83	1–24 (1–11)	Swinney Recreation Center (372); Kansas City, MO
February 23, 2019; 12:00 p.m.		at Chicago State	L 61–64	1–25 (1–12)	Jones Convocation Center (255); Chicago, IL
February 28, 2019; 6:00 p.m.		California Baptist	L 64–86	1–26 (1–13)	Redhawk Center (403); Seattle, WA
March 7, 2019; 7:00 p.m., ESPN3		at Cal State Bakersfield	W 68–58	2–26 (2–13)	Icardo Center (519); Bakersfield, CA
March 9, 2019; 1:00 p.m.		at Grand Canyon	W 70–55	3–26 (3–13)	GCU Arena (590); Phoenix, AZ
WAC women's tournament
March 13, 2019; 6:00 p.m.	(7)	vs. (2) Texas–Rio Grande Valley; Quarterfinals	L 54–56	3–27	Orleans Arena; Paradise, NV
*Non-conference game. ^{#}Rankings from AP poll. (#) Tournament seedings in parentheses. All times are in Pacific.

== See also ==
- 2018–19 Seattle Redhawks men's basketball team
