= Kristen Dowling =

American basketball coach

Biographical details
- Born: July 24, 1984 (age 41); Upland, California, U.S.

Playing career
- 2003–2006: Redlands

Coaching career (HC unless noted)
- 2005–2006: Upland HS
- 2006–2008: Pepperdine (GA)
- 2008–2010: Cal State Bakersfield (assistant)
- 2010–2012: Pepperdine (assistant)
- 2012–2019: Claremont-Mudd-Scripps
- 2019–2023: Pepperdine

Administrative career (AD unless noted)
- 2006–2008: Pepperdine (academic advisor)

Head coaching record
- Overall: 168–79 (.680) (college)
- Tournaments: 2–4 (NCAA Division III)

Accomplishments and honors

Championships
- 6 SCIAC regular season (2014–2019); 4 SCIAC tournament (2014–2017)

Awards
- SCIAC Coach of the Year (2015)

Kristen Dowling (born July 24, 1984) is an American basketball coach. From 2019 to 2023, she was the head women's basketball coach at Pepperdine University. She was previously the head women's basketball coach of the Claremont-Mudd-Scripps Athenas, a program involving students from Claremont McKenna College, Harvey Mudd College, and Scripps College in Claremont, California.

== Coaching career ==
After one season as the head coach of the freshman team at her alma mater Upland High School, Dowling was a graduate assistant and academic advisor at Pepperdine for two seasons. She returned to Pepperdine in 2010 as an assistant coach after two seasons as an assistant at Cal State Bakersfield before leaving to be the head coach at Division III program Claremont-Mudd-Scripps. At Claremont-Mudd-Scripps, she rebounded from a 9–16 record in her first season to winning six consecutive Southern California Intercollegiate Athletic Conference (SCIAC) regular season titles and a SCIAC Coach of the Year award in 2015.

Dowling was named the head coach at Pepperdine in 2019, marking her third stint with the program.

== Head coaching record ==
Statistics overview
Season	Team	Overall	Conference	Standing	Postseason
Claremont-Mudd-Scripps Athenas (Southern California Intercollegiate Athletic Conference) (2012–2019)
2012–13	Claremont-Mudd-Scripps	9–16	5–11	T–6th	
2013–14	Claremont-Mudd-Scripps	24–4	14–2	T–1st	NCAA Division III First Round
2014–15	Claremont-Mudd-Scripps	24–4	16–0	1st	NCAA Division III First Round
2015–16	Claremont-Mudd-Scripps	23–6	15–1	1st	NCAA Division III Second Round
2016–17	Claremont-Mudd-Scripps	20–9	13–3	T–1st	NCAA Division III Second Round
2017–18	Claremont-Mudd-Scripps	23–4	15–1	T–1st	
2018–19	Claremont-Mudd-Scripps	24–3	15–1	1st	
Claremont-Mudd-Scripps:		147–46 (.762)	93–19 (.830)		
Pepperdine Waves (West Coast Conference) (2019–2023)
2019–20	Pepperdine	16–15	8–10	6th	
2020–21	Pepperdine	5–18	2–16	10th	
2021–22	Pepperdine	8–17	4–11		
2022–23	Pepperdine	11–19	5–13		
Pepperdine:		40–69 (.367)	19–50 (.275)		
Total:		187–115 (.619)			
National champion Postseason invitational champion Conference regular season champion Conference regular season and conference tournament champion Division regular season champion Division regular season and conference tournament champion Conference tournament champion

== Career statistics ==
Ratios
Year	Team	GP	FG%	3P%	FT%	RBG	APG	BPG	SPG	PPG
2002–03	Redlands	3	37.5%	–	–	0.667	0.333	–	1.333	2.000
2003–04	Redlands	15	37.5%	14.3%	42.9%	1.400	0.533	–	0.800	1.867
2004–05	Redlands	25	35.7%	–	62.5%	1.960	0.560	0.080	0.680	2.200
2005–06	Redlands	19	36.1%	0.0%	28.6%	1.211	0.632	0.000	0.947	1.579
Career		62	36.4%	7.7%	48.9%	1.532	0.565	0.032	0.823	1.919

Totals
Year	Team	GP	FG	FGA	3P	3PA	FT	FTA	REB	A	BK	ST	PTS
2002–03	Redlands	3	3	8	0	0	0	0	2	1	0	4	6
2003–04	Redlands	15	12	32	1	7	3	7	21	8	0	12	28
2004–05	Redlands	25	20	56	0	3	15	24	49	14	2	17	55
2005–06	Redlands	19	13	36	0	3	4	14	23	12	0	18	30
Career		62	48	132	1	13	22	45	95	35	2	51	119
