= Odyssey (website) =

American internet media company

- Website type: News; Entertainment
- Owners: Odyssey Media Group, Inc.
- Key people: Evan Burns (co-founder and executive chairman); Adrian France (co-founder)
- Website: Official website
- Launched: July 16, 1999; 27 years ago (made public in 2000)

Odyssey (also known as The Odyssey or The Odyssey Online) is an American internet media company that operates based on a crowdsourced model, receiving articles from a base of thousands of volunteer authors and edited through their teams of volunteer, outsourced, and professional content strategists.

== History ==
Odyssey was co-founded by Evan Burns and Adrian France, two students from Indiana University, in 2014 under the Odyssey Media Group, Inc. In 2015 and early 2016, Odyssey received funding from various sources, totaling over $33 million. In February 2017, Odyssey laid off 53 employees, a third of its staff. Evan Burns, the former CEO, was relieved of most major financial and management duties and was given the title executive chairman.

The platform's users consist mostly of university and college students in the age range of 18–28, and its viewers mostly come from each individual user's social media networks, such as Facebook and Twitter. Odyssey's users are required to apply to start writing articles; the requirements for these authors include having a "unique perspective" and the ability to submit one piece per week. Once a user has been approved, they can start posting content on the platform. Most pieces of content are reviewed in a three-tiered editing system, starting with volunteer editors, then moving on to an outsourced set of freelance copy editors, and finally back to a set of paid content strategists, employed by Odyssey. Odyssey was described by CNBC as "clickbait" written by "thousands of college students".
