= John Nicholas Brown Chair of Counterterrorism =

Following al Qaeda's attacks on 9-11 the Naval War College Foundation established the John Nicholas Brown Chair of Counterterrorism. The endowment fund campaign was chaired by former President George Herbert Walker Bush. United States Senator John McCain and former Chief of Naval Operations were the campaigns honorary co-chairs. The endowment fund campaign reached its goal in 2006.

== Individuals who held the chair include ==
2006	Jeffrey H. Norwitz
2010	Ahmed Hashim
2011	Timothy Hoyt
