= Jeffrey H. Norwitz =

Jeffrey Howard Norwitz is an American expert in counter-terrorism and law enforcement. Norwitz spent 38 years as a law enforcement officer, the last 25 years of which were spent with the Naval Criminal Investigative Service. From 2006 through 2009 he held the John Nicholas Brown Chair of Counterterrorism at the Naval War College. Norwitz is known for his publications on counter-terrorism, and for frequently being consulted as a "terrorism expert". Norwitz is also the author of several books on counter-terrorism.

== Education ==
year	Degree	Institution
1970	Diploma	Conard High School in West Hartford, Connecticut
1974	Bachelor's Degree in Law Enforcement	Eastern Kentucky University
2001	Master in National Security and Strategic Studies	Naval War College

== Military and Law enforcement career ==
Norwitz served as a Military policeman in the United States Army, being directly commissioned following his graduation from Eastern Kentucky University. His duties in the army included guarding nuclear weapons. Norwitz spent three years in the Army.

In 1978 Norwitz became a Sheriff's deputy in Colorado Springs. While there he served as a SWAT team sniper, weapons instructor and commanded the bomb disposal squad.

In 1985 he joined the Navy Criminal Investigative Service, where his speciality was counter-intelligence and counter-terrorism. In 1994 Norwitz received the Meritorious Civilian Service Medal for actions the Navy felt had to be kept secret. According to the Hartford Courant Secretary of the Navy John Dalton personally presented the award to Norwitz, saying: "Today's ceremony is an outstanding example of how one agent's innovative approach to a problem, coupled with his experience and dedication to his profession and his country, assisted the Navy in maintaining a technological edge, while at the same time providing an enormous monetary savings to the government."

The Hartford Courant reported it was unusual for NCIS agents to be personally decorated by the Secretary to the navy, and that Norwitz's award was supplemented by a very unusual cash payment.

Norwitz received a second Meritorious Civilian Service Medal in 1998 for activities during Operation Desert Fox.

Mr Norwitz served briefly (2003–04) with the Criminal Investigative Task Force at Guantanamo Bay detention camps, in Cuba, where he interviewed suspected Taliban and al Qaeda fighters.

In addition to his two Navy Meritorious Civilian Service Medals he was also awarded the Secretary of Defense Medal for the Global War on Terrorism and the Navy Superior Civilian Service Medal.

Norwitz was selected as the 2006 distinguished alumnus by the Military Science and Leadership Department of the College of Business and Technology at Eastern Kentucky University.

After graduating with a Master in National Security and Strategic Studies from the Naval War College Norwitz was asked to be a professor at that institution. He was appointed John Nicholas Brown Chair of Counterterrorism. Norwitz served as both an active NCIS agent and a Professor until his retirement from government service in 2009.

== Civilian career ==
After Norwitz retired from government service he served as National Security Advisor from 2010-2013 with Sark Securities.

Today, Norwitz provides background investigation expertise for sensitive national security clients.
