= Chrissy Roberts =

American basketball player and coach

Current position
- Title: Assistant coach
- Team: Lindenwood Lions
- Conference: Ohio Valley

Biographical details
- Born: December 25, 1975 (age 50); Eminence, Kentucky, U.S.

Playing career
- 1993–1995: Kentucky
- 1996–1998: Eastern Kentucky

Coaching career (HC unless noted)
- 1998–1999: Eastern Kentucky (GA)
- 1999–2000: Tennessee Tech (asst.)
- 2000–2002: Eastern Kentucky (asst.)
- 2002–2008: East Carolina (asst.)
- 2008–2018: Eastern Kentucky
- 2020–2022: Indianapolis (asst.)
- 2022–Present: Lindenwood (asst.)

Head coaching record
- Overall: 122–194 (.386)

Accomplishments and honors

Awards
- OVC Player of the Year (1998); 2x First-team All-OVC (1997, 1998)

Chrissie Roberts (born December 25, 1975) is an American college basketball coach and the former women's head coach at Eastern Kentucky University (EKU) in Richmond, Kentucky.

== Biography ==
A native of Eminence, Kentucky, Roberts won first team All State honors and was an All-American selection at Eminence High School, and she was picked to play in the Kentucky-Indiana All-Star game. After attending Kentucky for two years, she transferred to EKU. In her two seasons at Eastern, Roberts led the Lady Colonels to two OVC regular season titles, a conference tournament championship, and appearances in the NCAA and WNIT tournaments. During her junior season (1996–97), she nead the nation in three point shooting, winning both the Naismith Memorial Basketball Hall of Fame's Edward S. Steitz Award and the AT&T Long Distance Award. Her shoes, jersey and practice gear were enshrined in the Basketball Hall of Fame in Springfield, Massachusetts. She was named an OVC First Team All-Conference member in both seasons and, in the 1997–98 season, was named OVC Player of the Year and was an Honorable Mention selection on the Kodak All-American Team. She still holds the EKU records for most three point field goals in a season (85 in 1996–97) and highest career three point shooting percentage (47.6%). She was named a member of the EKU Athletics Hall of Fame in 2007. Roberts earned her bachelor's degree in sports supervision in 1998 and her master's degree in sports administration in 1999, both from EKU.

== Career statistics ==
=== College ===
Year	Team	GP	GS	MPG	FG%	3P%	FT%	RPG	APG	SPG	BPG	TO	PPG
1993–94	Kentucky	28	-	-	38.3	35.6	66.7	1.9	1.1	0.9	0.0	-	4.3
1994–95	Kentucky	27	-	-	40.1	36.2	78.9	3.0	1.9	1.1	0.1	-	7.9
1995–96	Eastern Kentucky	Sat out due to NCAA Transfer Rules											
1996–97	Eastern Kentucky	30	-	-	46.0	48.8	82.3	3.8	2.8	1.6	0.1	-	13.4
1997–98	Eastern Kentucky	28	-	-	48.6	45.9	89.2	3.2	4.4	2.2	0.1	-	15.2
Career		113	-	-	44.5	43.2	83.5	3.0	2.6	1.5	0.1	-	10.2
Statistics retrieved from Sports-Reference.

== Coaching career ==
After graduating from Eastern Kentucky, Roberts remained there as a graduate assistant coach while earning her master's degree. She then spent one year as an assistant coach at Tennessee Tech before returning to EKU for two more years as an assistant coach. In 2002, Roberts began a six-year stint as an assistant for the East Carolina Pirates. On June 3, 2008, Roberts was named as the eighth coach in the history of Eastern Kentucky women's basketball program and returned to her alma mater.

== Head coaching record ==
- OVC 2017–18 Women's Basketball Standings

Record table
Season	Team	Overall	Conference	Standing	Postseason
Eastern Kentucky University (Ohio Valley Conference) (2008–2019)
2008–09	Eastern Kentucky	7–20	4–14	t-8th	
2009–10	Eastern Kentucky	12–17	8–10	t-4th	
2010–11	Eastern Kentucky	6–21	3–15	10th	
2011–12	Eastern Kentucky	13–16	7–9	t-6th	
2012–13	Eastern Kentucky	18–12	11–5	t-2nd East	0–1 (WBI)
2013–14	Eastern Kentucky	17–13	9–7	t-2nd East	
2014–15	Eastern Kentucky	9–17	4–12	9th	
2015–16	Eastern Kentucky	18–12	10–6	4th	
2016–17	Eastern Kentucky	12–20	7–9	t-6th	
2017–18	Eastern Kentucky	8–19	5–13	9th	
2018–19	Eastern Kentucky	2–27	0–18	12th	
Eastern Kentucky:		122–194 (.386)	68–118 (.366)		
Total:		122–194 (.386)			
National champion Postseason invitational champion Conference regular season champion Conference regular season and conference tournament champion Division regular season champion Division regular season and conference tournament champion Conference tournament champion
