= 2018–19 Old Dominion Monarchs women's basketball team =

Intercollegiate basketball season

2018–19 Old Dominion Monarchs women's basketball

WNIT, First Round
- Conference: Conference USA
- Record: 21–11 (10–6 C-USA)
- Head coach: Nikki McCray-Penson (2nd season)
- Assistant coaches: Keith Freeman (1st season); Scepter Brownlee (1st season); Brittany Young (2nd season)
- Home arena: Ted Constant Convocation Center

2018–19 Conference USA women's basketball standings
	Conf.				Overall
Team	W		L	PCT	W		L	PCT
No. 21 Rice †	16	–	0	1.000	28	–	4	.875
UAB	12	–	4	.750	26	–	7	.788
Middle Tennessee	11	–	5	.688	23	–	11	.676
Western Kentucky	11	–	5	.688	20	–	15	.571
Old Dominion	10	–	6	.625	21	–	11	.656
Marshall	10	–	6	.625	17	–	15	.531
Charlotte	9	–	7	.563	18	–	14	.563
Southern Miss	9	–	7	.563	18	–	14	.563
North Texas	7	–	9	.438	18	–	16	.529
Louisiana Tech	6	–	10	.375	14	–	16	.467
UTEP	5	–	11	.313	9	–	22	.290
UTSA	2	–	14	.125	7	–	21	.250
FIU	2	–	14	.125	5	–	24	.172
Florida Atlantic	2	–	14	.125	5	–	25	.167
† 2019 C-USA Tournament winner Rankings from AP poll

The 2018–19 Old Dominion Monarchs women’s basketball team represented Old Dominion University during the 2018–19 NCAA Division I women's basketball season. The Monarchs, led by second-year head coach Nikki McCray-Penson, played their home games at Ted Constant Convocation Center and were members of Conference USA.

They finished the season 21–11, 10–6 in C-USA play to finish in a tie for fifth place. They advanced to the quarterfinals of the C-USA women's tournament, where they lost to WKU. They received an at-large bid to the Women's National Invitation Tournament, where they lost to Villanova in the first round.

== Roster ==
2018–19 Old Dominion Monarchs women's basketball team
Players
Coaches

Pos.	#	Name	Height	Year	Previous school	Hometown
G	0	Ann Jernigan	5 ft 8 in (1.73 m)	RS Jr	Edgewater; Northwest Florida JC	Orlando, FL
G	1	Mariah Adams	6 ft 0 in (1.83 m)	Fr	eStem	Little Rock, AR
G	2	MaKayla Timmons	5 ft 7 in (1.7 m)	Sr	Ramsay	Columbia, TN
G/F	3	Ajah Wayne	5 ft 10 in (1.78 m)	Fr	Ramsay	Birmingham, AL
G	4	Aziah Hudson	5 ft 6 in (1.68 m)	Fr	Baldwin	Baldwin, NY
G	5	Victoria Morris	5 ft 8 in (1.73 m)	So	North College Hill	Cincinnati, OH
G	11	Taylor Edwards	5 ft 9 in (1.75 m)	Jr	Woodrow Wilson	Portsmouth, VA
G	12	Amaya Register	5 ft 4 in (1.63 m)	Fr	Wesleyan	Conyers, GA
F	14	Dejah Carter	6 ft 2 in (1.88 m)	So	Cosby	Chesterfield, VA
F	20	Maggie Robinson	6 ft 0 in (1.83 m)	Jr	W. P. Davidson; Shelton State CC	Mobile, AL
F	23	Amari Young	5 ft 11 in (1.8 m)	Fr	North Augusta	North Augusta, SC
C	25	Ashley Scott	6 ft 3 in (1.91 m)	Jr	UMS-Wright Preparatory; Shelton State CC	Mobile, AL
F	35	Hannah Sadler	6 ft 3 in (1.91 m)	Fr	Parkview	Lilburn, GA

Head coach

- Nikki McCray-Penson (Tennessee)

Assistant coach(es)

- Keith Freeman (Huntington)
- Scepter Brownlee (San Francisco '04)
- Brittany Young (Francis Marion '08)

Legend

- (C) Team captain
- (S) Suspended
- (I) Ineligible
- (W) Walk-on
- Injured
- Current redshirt

Roster

== Schedule ==
Date time, TV	Rank^{#}	Opponent^{#}	Result	Record	High points	High rebounds	High assists	Site (attendance) city, state
Exhibition
Nov 2, 2018*; 7:00 pm		Christopher Newport	W 77–42		–	–	–	Ted Constant Convocation Center; Norfolk, VA
Non-conference regular season
Nov 6, 2018*; 5:00 pm		at Campbell	W 83–59	1–0	22 – Wayne	9 – Carter	5 – Edwards	Gore Arena (2,416); Buies Creek, NC
Nov 9, 2018*; 6:30 pm		Norfolk State; Rivalry	W 69–53	2–0	15 – Edwards	10 – Wayne	5 – Wayne	Ted Constant Convocation Center (2,706); Norfolk, VA
Nov 12, 2018*; 7:00 pm		at Cincinnati	W 76–72 ^{OT}	3–0	24 – Wayne	16 – Wayne	3 – Wayne	Fifth Third Arena (882); Cincinnati, OH
Nov 18, 2018*; 2:00 pm, ESPN+		Virginia	L 67–73	3–1	17 – Morris	11 – Young	9 – Edwards	Ted Constant Convocation Center (2,137); Norfolk, VA
Nov 24, 2018*; 4:00 pm		vs. Jacksonville; Buccaneer Classic	W 78–76 ^{OT}	4–1	16 – Edwards	10 – Wayne	10 – Edwards	CSU Field House (355); North Charleston, SC
Nov 25, 2018*; 2:00 pm		vs. Tennessee Tech; Buccaneer Classic	W 80–73	5–1	20 – Carter	12 – Wayne	6 – Edwards	CSU Field House (285); North Charleston, SC
Dec 2, 2018*; 2:00 pm		at No. 13 NC State	L 56–85	5–2	17 – Robinson	15 – Wayne	2 – 3 tied	Reynolds Coliseum (2,720); Raleigh, NC
Dec 8, 2018*; 4:00 pm		William & Mary; Rivalry	W 83–69	6–2	17 – Edwards	8 – Wayne	7 – Edwards	Ted Constant Convocation Center (1,802); Norfolk, VA
Dec 16, 2018*; 2:00 pm		VCU	W 60–57	7–2	20 – Edwards	9 – Edwards	2 – 2 tied	Ted Constant Convocation Center (2,259); Norfolk, VA
Dec 21, 2018*; 2:00 pm		at Tulane; Tulane Classic semifinals	W 56–48	8–2	13 – 2 tied	8 – Edwards	4 – Adams	Devlin Fieldhouse (768); New Orleans, LA
Dec 22, 2018*; 3:00 pm		vs. Saint Mary's; Tulane Classic championship	L 65–83	8–3	13 – 2 tied	9 – Wayne	4 – Wayne	Devlin Fieldhouse; New Orleans, LA
Dec 29, 2018*; 4:00 pm		Coppin State	W 81–51	9–3	13 – Wayne	10 – Young	5 – Adams	Ted Constant Convocation Center (1,718); Norfolk, VA
C-USA regular season
Jan 3, 2019; 6:00 pm		at Marshall	L 48–57	9–4 (0–1)	14 – Wayne	12 – Young	3 – Edwards	Cam Henderson Center (698); Huntington, WV
Jan 5, 2019; 3:00 pm		at Western Kentucky	L 60–75	9–5 (0–2)	16 – Young	12 – Wayne	4 – Wayne	E. A. Diddle Arena (1,236); Bowling Green, KY
Jan 10, 2019; 6:30 pm		Florida Atlantic	W 87–53	10–5 (1–2)	20 – Morris	10 – Young	7 – Wayne	Ted Constant Convocation Center (1,396); Norfolk, VA
Jan 12, 2019; 4:00 pm		FIU	W 95–68	11–5 (2–2)	20 – Morris	5 – 3 tied	6 – Edwards	Ted Constant Convocation Center (1,537); Norfolk, VA
Jan 17, 2019; 7:30 pm		at Louisiana Tech	W 70–59	12–5 (3–2)	20 – Morris	7 – Young	7 – Edwards	Thomas Assembly Center (1,608); Ruston, LA
Jan 19, 2019; 5:00 pm		at Southern Miss	W 53–50	13–5 (4–2)	14 – Carter	8 – Wayne	7 – Edwards	Reed Green Coliseum (1,099); Hattiesburg, MS
Jan 24, 2019; 11:00 am		UTEP	W 78–59	14–5 (5–2)	16 – Edwards	12 – Wayne	6 – Edwards	Ted Constant Convocation Center (6,314); Norfolk, VA
Jan 26, 2019; 4:00 pm		UTSA	W 72–47	15–5 (6–2)	13 – Hudson	8 – Robinson	6 – Edwards	Ted Constant Convocation Center (1,928); Norfolk, VA
Jan 31, 2019; 8:00 pm		at North Texas	W 72–71	16–5 (7–2)	16 – Wayne	6 – Carter	4 – Edwards	The Super Pit (651); Denton, TX
Feb 2, 2019; 3:00 pm		at Rice	L 42–48	16–6 (7–3)	20 – Morris	6 – Edwards	2 – Edwards	Tudor Fieldhouse (737); Houston, TX
Feb 7, 2019; 6:30 pm, ESPN+		UAB	L 61–69	16–7 (7–4)	18 – Wayne	8 – 2 tied	2 – 3 tied	Ted Constant Convocation Center (1,560); Norfolk, VA
Feb 9, 2019; 4:00 pm		Middle Tennessee	W 70–65	17–7 (8–4)	23 – Hudson	12 – Scott	5 – Wayne	Ted Constant Convocation Center (2,400); Norfolk, VA
Feb 16, 2019; 4:00 pm		at Charlotte	L 59–69	17–8 (8–5)	17 – Young	7 – Carter	6 – Edwards	Dale F. Halton Arena (1,177); Charlotte, NC
Feb 23, 2019; 4:00 pm		Charlotte	L 53–60	17–9 (8–6)	11 – Hudson	6 – 2 tied	4 – Robinson	Ted Constant Convocation Center (2,230); Norfolk, VA
Mar 2, 2019; 4:00 pm		Marshall	W 79–53	18–9 (9–6)	21 – Wayne	11 – Young	7 – Edwards	Ted Constant Convocation Center (2,408); Norfolk, VA
Mar 4, 2019*; 6:30 pm		Longwood	W 69–48	19–9	17 – Carter	12 – Young	4 – 2 tied	Ted Constant Convocation Center (1,973); Norfolk, VA
Mar 7, 2019; 7:00 pm		at Florida Atlantic	W 68–64	20–9 (10–6)	17 – Wayne	12 – Young	3 – Edwards	FAU Arena (388); Boca Raton, FL
C-USA Tournament
Mar 13, 2019; 12:30 pm, ESPN+	(5)	vs. (12) Florida Atlantic; First Round	W 60–32	21–9	10 – 3 tied	12 – Scott	6 – Edwards	Ford Center at The Star; Frisco, TX
Mar 14, 2019; 12:30 pm, ESPN+	(5)	vs. (4) Western Kentucky; Quarterfinals	L 60–74	21–10	20 – Edwards	9 – Wayne	6 – Edwards	Ford Center at The Star; Frisco, TX
WNIT
Mar 22, 2019*; 7:00 pm		at Villanova; First Round	L 81–86 ^{OT}	21–11	21 – Morris	7 – 2 tied	4 – Edwards	Finneran Pavilion (521); Villanova, PA
*Non-conference game. ^{#}Rankings from AP Poll. (#) Tournament seedings in parentheses. All times are in Eastern Time.

- Source: Old Dominion Athletics

== See also ==
- 2018–19 Old Dominion Monarchs men's basketball team
