= 2018–19 Western Kentucky Lady Toppers basketball team =

Intercollegiate basketball season

2018–19 Western Kentucky Lady Toppers basketball

WNIT, third round
- Conference: Conference USA
- Record: 20–15 (11–5 C-USA)
- Head coach: Greg Collins (1st season)
- Assistant coaches: Jocelyn Wyatt; Tiffany Porter-Talbert; Jhasmin Bowen
- Home arena: E. A. Diddle Arena

2018–19 Conference USA women's basketball standings
	Conf.				Overall
Team	W		L	PCT	W		L	PCT
No. 21 Rice †	16	–	0	1.000	28	–	4	.875
UAB	12	–	4	.750	26	–	7	.788
Middle Tennessee	11	–	5	.688	23	–	11	.676
Western Kentucky	11	–	5	.688	20	–	15	.571
Old Dominion	10	–	6	.625	21	–	11	.656
Marshall	10	–	6	.625	17	–	15	.531
Charlotte	9	–	7	.563	18	–	14	.563
Southern Miss	9	–	7	.563	18	–	14	.563
North Texas	7	–	9	.438	18	–	16	.529
Louisiana Tech	6	–	10	.375	14	–	16	.467
UTEP	5	–	11	.313	9	–	22	.290
UTSA	2	–	14	.125	7	–	21	.250
FIU	2	–	14	.125	5	–	24	.172
Florida Atlantic	2	–	14	.125	5	–	25	.167
† 2019 C-USA Tournament winner Rankings from AP poll

The 2018–19 Western Kentucky Lady Toppers basketball team represented Western Kentucky University during the 2018–19 NCAA Division I women's basketball season. The Lady Toppers were led by first-year head coach Greg Collins and played their home games at E. A. Diddle Arena in Bowling Green, Kentucky as members of Conference USA (C-USA). They finished the season 20–15, 11–5 in C-USA play, to finish in a tie for third place. They advanced to the semifinals of the C-USA women's tournament, where they lost to Rice. They received an at-large bid to the Women's National Invitation Tournament, where they defeated Miami (OH) and Morehead State in the first and second rounds, respectively, before losing to Ohio in the third round.

== Roster ==
2018–19 WKU Lady Toppers women's basketball team
Players
Coaches

Pos.	#	Name	Height	Year	Previous school	Hometown
F	1	Arame Niang	6 ft 3 in (1.91 m)	RS So		Rufisque, Senegal
G	3	Sidnee Bopp	5 ft 6 in (1.68 m)	Sr	Marmaduke HS	Marmaduke, AR
F	4	Dee Givens	6 ft 1 in (1.85 m)	RS Jr	Lafayette HS	Lexington, KY
G	5	Whitney Creech	5 ft 8 in (1.73 m)	Jr	Jenkins HS	Jenkins, KY
G	11	Alexis Brewer	5 ft 9 in (1.75 m)	RS Jr	Bardstown HS; West Virginia	Buffalo, KY
F	13	Jae'Lisa Allen	6 ft 2 in (1.88 m)	Sr	White Hall HS; Virginia	Pine Bluff, AR
F	15	Raneem Elgedawy	6 ft 4 in (1.93 m)	So		Alexandria, Egypt
G	20	Terri Smith	5 ft 7 in (1.7 m)	So	Sparkman	Harvest, AL
G	22	Sherry Porter	5 ft 7 in (1.7 m)	So	Madison Prep Academy	Baton Rouge, LA
F	23	Sandra Skinner (redshirt)	6 ft 1 in (1.85 m)	Sr	George Rogers Clark HS; VCU	Winchester, KY
G	24	Myriah Noodel-Haywood	5 ft 11 in (1.8 m)	Fr	Edwardsville HS	Edwardsville, IL
G/F	32	Kayla Smith	5 ft 11 in (1.8 m)	Sr	Fayette County HS	Fayetteville, GA
C	34	Kallie Searcy	6 ft 3 in (1.91 m)	Fr	Brentwood Academy	Brentwood, TN
G	44	Meral Abdelgawad	5 ft 11 in (1.8 m)	Fr		Cairo, Egypt

Head coach

- Greg Collins (Louisville)

Assistant coach(es)

- Jocelyn Wyatt (Appalachian State)
- Tiffany Porter-Talbert (Western Kentucky)
- Jhasmin Bowen (Arkansas)

Legend

- (C) Team captain
- (S) Suspended
- (I) Ineligible
- (W) Walk-on
- Injured
- Current redshirt

Roster
Last update: February 25, 2025

== Schedule ==
Date time, TV	Rank^{#}	Opponent^{#}	Result	Record	Site (attendance) city, state
Exhibition
November 1, 2018*; 6:00 p.m.		West Virginia State	W 104–74		E. A. Diddle Arena (854); Bowling Green, KY
Non-conference regular season
November 6, 2018*; 6:00 p.m., ESPN+		No. 15 Louisville	L 80–102	0–1	E. A. Diddle Arena (3,476); Bowling Green, KY
November 9, 2018*; 7:00 p.m., FSOK		at Oklahoma	L 83–90	0–2	Lloyd Noble Center (2,907); Norman, OK
November 13, 2018*; 6:00 p.m., ESPN3/WKYU		No. 13 Iowa	L 67–104	0–3	E. A. Diddle Arena (1,301); Bowling Green, KY
November 17, 2018*; 12:00 p.m., ESPN3		at Central Michigan	L 90–108	0–4	McGuirk Arena (1,696); Mount Pleasant, MI
November 20, 2018*; 11:00 a.m.		Southern Illinois	W 83–76	1–4	E. A. Diddle Arena (4,792); Bowling Green, KY
November 22, 2018*; 10:30 p.m.		vs. No. 8 Oregon State; Vancouver Showcase quarterfinals	L 60–74	1–5	Vancouver Convention Centre (296); Vancouver, BC
November 23, 2018*; 4:30 p.m.		vs. East Tennessee State; Vancouver Showcase consolation 2nd round	W 82–68	2–5	Vancouver Convention Centre (1,022); Vancouver, BC
November 24, 2018*; 3:30 p.m.		vs. Gonzaga; Vancouver Showcase 5th-place game	L 55–76	2–6	Vancouver Convention Centre (722); Vancouver, BC
November 28, 2018*; 6:00 p.m.		Morgan State	W 90–43	3–6	E. A. Diddle Arena (1,056); Bowling Green, KY
December 1, 2018*; 5:00 p.m.		at Little Rock	W 68–56	4–6	Jack Stephens Center (1,777); Little Rock, AR
December 8, 2018*; 2:00 p.m.		Bellarmine	W 68–56	5–6	E. A. Diddle Arena (1,204); Bowling Green, KY
December 16, 2018*; 5:00 p.m., ESPN3/WKYU		Ball State	L 83–86	5–7	E. A. Diddle Arena (715); Bowling Green, KY
December 19, 2018*; 6:00 p.m., ACCNE		at No. 2 Notre Dame	L 53–94	5–8	Edmund P. Joyce Center (7,502); South Bend, IN
December 29, 2018*; 7:00 p.m.		Union (TN)	W 77–65	6–8	E. A. Diddle Arena (1,214); Bowling Green, KY
Conference USA regular season
January 3, 2019; 6:00 p.m., ESPN3/WKYU		Charlotte	W 76–58	7–8 (1–0)	E. A. Diddle Arena (892); Bowling Green, KY
January 5, 2019; 2:00 p.m.		Old Dominion	W 75–60	8–8 (2–0)	E. A. Diddle Arena (1,236); Bowling Green, KY
January 12, 2019; 2:00 p.m., ESPN3/WKYU		Marshall	W 85–55	9–8 (3–0)	E. A. Diddle Arena (1,391); Bowling Green, KY
January 17, 2019; 10:00 a.m., beIN		at FIU	W 94–82	10–8 (4–0)	Ocean Bank Convocation Center (1,383); Miami, FL
January 19, 2019; 1:00 p.m.		at Florida Atlantic	W 81–50	11–8 (5–0)	FAU Arena (368); Boca Raton, FL
January 24, 2019; 6:00 p.m.		Southern Miss	L 56–69	11–9 (5–1)	E. A. Diddle Arena (1,187); Bowling Green, KY
January 26, 2019; 2:00 p.m., ESPN3/WKYU		Louisiana Tech	W 81–76	12–9 (6–1)	E. A. Diddle Arena (2,759); Bowling Green, KY
January 31, 2019; 11:00 a.m.		at UTSA	W 81–62	13–9 (7–1)	Convocation Center (1,200); San Antonio, TX
February 2, 2019; 2:00 p.m.		at UTEP	W 64–61	14–9 (8–1)	Don Haskins Center (429); El Paso, TX
February 7, 2019; 6:00 p.m.		Rice	L 46–68	14–10 (8–2)	E. A. Diddle Arena (1,347); Bowling Green, KY
February 9, 2019; 2:00 p.m.		North Texas	L 67–76	14–11 (8–3)	E. A. Diddle Arena (1,363); Bowling Green, KY
February 14, 2019; 6:30 p.m.		at Middle Tennessee	L 69–81	14–12 (8–4)	Murphy Center (3,922); Murfreesboro, TN
February 16, 2019; 2:00 p.m., ESPN+		at UAB	L 63–70	14–13 (8–5)	Bartow Arena (634); Birmingham, AL
February 23, 2019; 12:00 p.m., ESPN+		at Marshall	W 69–66 ^{OT}	15–13 (9–5)	Cam Henderson Center (1,182); Huntington, WV
March 2, 2019; 3:00 p.m.		at North Texas	W 71–66	16–13 (10–5)	The Super Pit (658); Denton, TX
March 7, 2019; 6:00 p.m., ESPN+		Middle Tennessee	W 67–56	17–13 (11–5)	E. A. Diddle Arena (1,823); Bowling Green, KY
Conference USA women's tournament
March 14, 2019; 11:30 a.m., Stadium	(4)	vs. (5) Old Dominion; Quarterfinals	W 74–60	18–13	The Ford Center at The Star; Frisco, TX
March 15, 2019; 8:00 p.m., Stadium	(4)	vs. (1) No. 24 Rice; Semifinals	L 57–64	18–14	The Ford Center at The Star; Frisco, TX
WNIT
March 21, 2019*; 6:00 p.m.		at Miami (OH); First round	W 67–63	19–14	Millett Hall (338); Oxford, OH
March 24, 2019*; 2:00 p.m.		Morehead State; Second round	W 68–65	20–14	E. A. Diddle Arena (1,206); Bowling Green, KY
March 28, 2019*; 6:00 p.m.		at Ohio; Third round	L 60–68	20–15	Convocation Center (1,491); Athens, OH
*Non-conference game. ^{#}Rankings from AP poll. (#) Tournament seedings in parentheses. All times are in Central.

== Rankings ==
Regular-season polls
Poll	Pre- season	Week 2	Week 3	Week 4	Week 5	Week 6	Week 7	Week 8	Week 9	Week 10	Week 11	Week 12	Week 13	Week 14	Week 15	Week 16	Week 17	Week 18	Week 19	Final
AP																				N/A
Coaches		N/A																		

Legend
	Increase in ranking
	Decrease in ranking
	Not ranked previous week
(RV)	Received votes
(NR)	Not ranked

== See also ==
- 2018–19 Western Kentucky Hilltoppers basketball team
