= 2018–19 Charlotte 49ers women's basketball team =

Intercollegiate basketball season

2018–19 Charlotte 49ers women's basketball
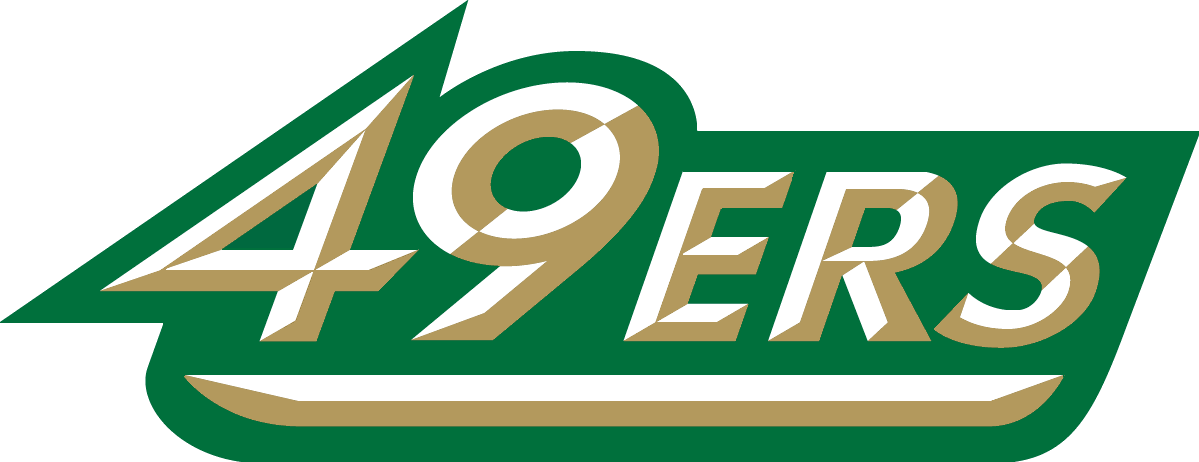

Christmas City Classic Champions

WNIT, First Round
- Conference: Conference USA
- Record: 18–14 (9–7 C-USA)
- Head coach: Cara Consuegra (7th season)
- Assistant coaches: Nicole Woods; Joanne Aluka-White; Tanisha Wright
- Home arena: Dale F. Halton Arena

2018–19 Conference USA women's basketball standings
	Conf.				Overall
Team	W		L	PCT	W		L	PCT
No. 21 Rice †	16	–	0	1.000	28	–	4	.875
UAB	12	–	4	.750	26	–	7	.788
Middle Tennessee	11	–	5	.688	23	–	11	.676
Western Kentucky	11	–	5	.688	20	–	15	.571
Old Dominion	10	–	6	.625	21	–	11	.656
Marshall	10	–	6	.625	17	–	15	.531
Charlotte	9	–	7	.563	18	–	14	.563
Southern Miss	9	–	7	.563	18	–	14	.563
North Texas	7	–	9	.438	18	–	16	.529
Louisiana Tech	6	–	10	.375	14	–	16	.467
UTEP	5	–	11	.313	9	–	22	.290
UTSA	2	–	14	.125	7	–	21	.250
FIU	2	–	14	.125	5	–	24	.172
Florida Atlantic	2	–	14	.125	5	–	25	.167
† 2019 C-USA Tournament winner Rankings from AP poll

The 2018–19 Charlotte 49ers women's basketball team represented the University of North Carolina at Charlotte during the 2018–19 NCAA Division I women's basketball season. The 49ers, led by seventh year head coach Cara Consuegra, played their home games at Dale F. Halton Arena and were members of Conference USA. They finished the season 18–14, 9–7 in C-USA play to finish in a tie for seventh place. They advanced to the quarterfinals of the C-USA women's tournament, where they lost to UAB. They received an at-large bid to the Women's National Invitation Tournament, where they lost to VCU in the first round.

== Roster ==
2018–19 Charlotte 49ers women's basketball team
Players
Coaches

Pos.	#	Name	Height	Year	Previous school	Hometown
G	2	Christian Hithe	5 ft 9 in (1.75 m)	RS So	Spring Valley; UCF	Columbia, SC
G	3	Mariah Linney	5 ft 9 in (1.75 m)	So	Goose Creek	Goose Creek, SC
G	4	Laia Raventós	5 ft 7 in (1.7 m)	RS Sr	IES Joaquim Blume	Santa Eulàlia de Riuprimer, Spain
G	5	Jade Phillips	5 ft 11 in (1.8 m)	RS Jr	Southeast Raleigh; Syracuse	Raleigh, NC
G	11	Rinnah Green	5 ft 8 in (1.73 m)	Fr	Hickory Ridge	Charlotte, NC
G	13	Octavia Jett-Wilson	5 ft 8 in (1.73 m)	So	Eleanor Roosevelt	Greenbelt, MD
F	14	Maddie Moore	6 ft 3 in (1.91 m)	Fr	WestRidge Academy	High Point, NC
G	15	Jada McMillian	5 ft 7 in (1.7 m)	Fr	Southeast Raleigh	Raleigh, NC
G	22	Lauren Harley	5 ft 8 in (1.73 m)	Jr	Blythewood	Columbia, SC
F	24	Lyrissa Deans	6 ft 3 in (1.91 m)	So	Bishop Ireton	Waldorf, MD
F	34	Dara Pearson	6 ft 3 in (1.91 m)	RS Jr	Hampton	Hampton, VA
C	40	Jazmin Harris	6 ft 3 in (1.91 m)	Fr	Eastern Guilford	Greensboro, NC
F	45	Ka'Neeshia Brown	6 ft 3 in (1.91 m)	Sr	South Miami; Daytona State	Miami, FL

Head coach

- Cara Consuegra (Iowa)

Assistant coach(es)

- Joanne Aluka-White (Middle Tennessee)
- Nicole Woods (Belmont Abbey)
- Tanisha Wright (Penn State)

Legend

- (C) Team captain
- (S) Suspended
- (I) Ineligible
- (W) Walk-on
- Injured
- Current redshirt

Roster

== Schedule ==
Date time, TV	Rank^{#}	Opponent^{#}	Result	Record	Site (attendance) city, state
Exhibition
Nov 3, 2018*; 4:00 pm		Chowan	W 78–44		Dale F. Halton Arena; Charlotte, NC
Non-conference regular season
Nov 8, 2018*; 7:00 pm		UNC Asheville	W 70–53	1–0	Dale F. Halton Arena (982); Charlotte, NC
Nov 11, 2018*; 2:00 pm		Wofford	W 85–63	2–0	Dale F. Halton Arena (734); Charlotte, NC
Nov 16, 2018*; 5:00 pm		Rutgers; Postponed (travel conditions)			Dale F. Halton Arena; Charlotte, NC
Nov 18, 2018*; 2:00 pm, ESPN+		at Fordham	L 64–71	2–1	Rose Hill Gymnasium (1,914); Bronx, NY
Nov 24, 2018*; 4:30 pm		vs. Liberty; Christmas City Classic semifinals	W 63–61	3–1	Stabler Arena (536); Bethlehem, PA
Nov 25, 2018*; 4:30 pm		at Lehigh; Christmas City Classic championship	W 62–60	4–1	Stabler Arena (489); Bethlehem, PA
Dec 1, 2018*; 4:00 pm		East Carolina	W 52–46	5–1	Dale F. Halton Arena (1,160); Charlotte, NC
Dec 5, 2018*; 7:00 pm		Wake Forest	L 43–69	5–2	Dale F. Halton Arena (819); Charlotte, NC
Dec 8, 2018*; 1:00 pm, ESPN3		at Mercer	L 40–57	5–3	Hawkins Arena (827); Macon, GA
Dec 18, 2018*; 11:30 am		Wright State	W 88–85 ^{OT}	6–3	Dale F. Halton Arena (8,249); Charlotte, NC
Dec 21, 2018*; 6:00 pm		Davidson	W 78–66	7–3	Dale F. Halton Arena (725); Charlotte, NC
Dec 28, 2018*; 7:00 pm		Bethune–Cookman	W 73–69	8–3	Dale F. Halton Arena (812); Charlotte, NC
Dec 30, 2018*; 2:00 pm		at Virginia	L 61–65	8–4	John Paul Jones Arena (2,841); Charlottesville, VA
Conference USA regular season
Jan 3, 2019; 7:00 pm, ESPN3		at Western Kentucky	L 58–76	8–5 (0–1)	E. A. Diddle Arena (892); Bowling Green, KY
Jan 5, 2019; 1:00 pm, ESPN+		at Marshall	L 62–63	8–6 (0–2)	Cam Henderson Center (738); Huntington, WV
Jan 10, 2019; 7:00 pm, beIN		FIU	W 69–54	9–6 (1–2)	Dale F. Halton Arena (830); Charlotte, NC
Jan 12, 2019; 4:00 pm		Florida Atlantic	W 68–47	10–6 (2–2)	Dale F. Halton Arena (863); Charlotte, NC
Jan 17, 2019; 7:00 pm		at Southern Miss	L 54–65	10–7 (2–3)	Reed Green Coliseum (1,200); Hattiesburg, MS
Jan 19, 2019; 3:00 pm		at Louisiana Tech	L 51–88	10–8 (2–4)	Thomas Assembly Center (1,477); Ruston, LA
Jan 24, 2019; 7:00 pm, beIN		UTSA	W 66–54	11–8 (3–4)	Dale F. Halton Arena (905); Charlotte, NC
Jan 26, 2019; 4:00 pm		UTEP	W 62–39	12–8 (4–4)	Dale F. Halton Arena (901); Charlotte, NC
Feb 1, 2019; 8:00 pm, ESPN+		at Rice	L 51–61	12–9 (4–5)	Tudor Fieldhouse (502); Houston, TX
Feb 3, 2019; 8:00 pm		at North Texas	L 63–68	12–10 (4–6)	The Super Pit (926); Denton, TX
Feb 7, 2019; 7:00 pm, ESPN+		Middle Tennessee	L 55–62	12–11 (4–7)	Dale F. Halton Arena (918); Charlotte, NC
Feb 9, 2019; 4:00 pm, ESPN+		UAB	W 60–56	13–11 (5–7)	Dale F. Halton Arena (1,002); Charlotte, NC
Feb 16, 2019; 4:00 pm		Old Dominion	W 69–59	14–11 (6–7)	Dale F. Halton Arena (1,177); Charlotte, NC
Feb 23, 2019; 4:00 pm		at Old Dominion	W 60–53	15–11 (7–7)	Ted Constant Convocation Center (2,230); Norfolk, VA
Mar 2, 2019; 2:00 pm		at FIU	W 62–53	16–11 (8–7)	Ocean Bank Convocation Center (327); Miami, FL
Mar 7, 2019; 7:00 pm		Southern Miss	W 59–46	17–12 (9–7)	Dale F. Halton Arena (668); Charlotte, NC
Conference USA Women's Tournament
Mar 13, 2019; 2:30 pm, ESPN+	(7)	vs. (10) Louisiana Tech; First Round	W 55–46	18–12	The Ford Center at The Star (1,921); Frisco, TX
Mar 14, 2019; 2:30 pm, Stadium	(7)	vs. (2) UAB; Quarterfinals	L 55–70	18–13	The Ford Center at The Star; Frisco, TX
WNIT
Mar 21, 2019*; 6:00 pm		at VCU; First Round	L 52–65	18–14	Siegel Center (383); Richmond, VA
*Non-conference game. ^{#}Rankings from AP Poll. (#) Tournament seedings in parentheses. All times are in Eastern Time.

== Rankings ==
2018–19 NCAA Division I women's basketball rankings

Regular season polls
Poll	Pre- Season	Week 2	Week 3	Week 4	Week 5	Week 6	Week 7	Week 8	Week 9	Week 10	Week 11	Week 12	Week 13	Week 14	Week 15	Week 16	Week 17	Week 18	Week 19	Final
AP																				N/A
Coaches																				

Legend
	Increase in ranking
	Decrease in ranking
	No change
(RV)	Received votes
(NR)	Not ranked

== See also ==
- 2018–19 Charlotte 49ers men's basketball team
