= 2018–19 UTEP Miners women's basketball team =

Intercollegiate basketball season

2018–19 UTEP Miners women's basketball
- Conference: Conference USA
- Record: 9–22 (5–11 C-USA)
- Head coach: Kevin Baker (2nd season)
- Assistant coaches: Michael Madrid; Lori Morris; Kayla Weaver
- Home arena: Don Haskins Center

2018–19 Conference USA women's basketball standings
	Conf.				Overall
Team	W		L	PCT	W		L	PCT
No. 21 Rice †	16	–	0	1.000	28	–	4	.875
UAB	12	–	4	.750	26	–	7	.788
Middle Tennessee	11	–	5	.688	23	–	11	.676
Western Kentucky	11	–	5	.688	20	–	15	.571
Old Dominion	10	–	6	.625	21	–	11	.656
Marshall	10	–	6	.625	17	–	15	.531
Charlotte	9	–	7	.563	18	–	14	.563
Southern Miss	9	–	7	.563	18	–	14	.563
North Texas	7	–	9	.438	18	–	16	.529
Louisiana Tech	6	–	10	.375	14	–	16	.467
UTEP	5	–	11	.313	9	–	22	.290
UTSA	2	–	14	.125	7	–	21	.250
FIU	2	–	14	.125	5	–	24	.172
Florida Atlantic	2	–	14	.125	5	–	25	.167
† 2019 C-USA Tournament winner Rankings from AP poll

The 2018–19 UTEP Miners women's basketball team represented the University of Texas at El Paso during the 2018–19 NCAA Division I women's basketball season. The Miners, led by second year head coach Kevin Baker, played their home games at Don Haskins Center and were members of Conference USA. They finished the season 9–22, 5–11 in C-USA play to finish in eleventh place. They advanced to the quarterfinals of the C-USA women's tournament, where they lost to Middle Tennessee.

== Roster ==
2018–19 UTEP Miners women's basketball team
Players
Coaches

Pos.	#	Name	Height	Year	Previous school	Hometown
G	0	Jordan Jenkins	5 ft 3 in (1.6 m)	So	Buffalo HS	Buffalo, TX
G/F	3	Jordan Alexander	5 ft 11 in (1.8 m)	Sr	Skyline HS; Trinity Valley CC	Dallas, TX
G	4	Neidy Ocuane	5 ft 5 in (1.65 m)	RS Jr	Seward County CC	Maputo, Mozambique
F	5	Zuzanna Puc	6 ft 2 in (1.88 m)	Jr	ZSMS Poznan	Poznań, Poland
G/F	10	Jade Rochelle	5 ft 11 in (1.8 m)	Jr	Grandview HS; Blinn College	Grandview, TX
F	12	Ariona Gill	5 ft 11 in (1.8 m)	RS Jr	Arbor View; San Jacinto College	Las Vegas, NV
G	13	Sabine Lipe	5 ft 9 in (1.75 m)	Fr	Liepajas 15 Vidusskola	Liepāja, Latvia
G	23	Alexa Hoy	5 ft 9 in (1.75 m)	So	Rockwall-Heath HS; Hill College	Rockwall, TX
G	24	Eliana Cabral	5 ft 10 in (1.78 m)	Fr	Escola Secundaria Jorge Peixinho	Barreiro, Portugal
F	25	Ariana Taylor	6 ft 0 in (1.83 m)	Fr	Wheatley HS	Houston, TX
G/F	44	Katarina Zec	5 ft 11 in (1.8 m)	Jr	Sportska gimnazija	Belgrade, Serbia

Head coach

- Kevin Baker (Stephen F. Austin)

Assistant coach(es)

- Nicole Dunson (Texas–San Antonio)
- Lori Morris (San Diego)
- Kayla Weaver (Texas Woman's)

Legend

- (C) Team captain
- (S) Suspended
- (I) Ineligible
- (W) Walk-on
- Injured
- Current redshirt

Roster
Last update: December 27, 2017

== Schedule ==
Date time, TV	Rank^{#}	Opponent^{#}	Result	Record	Site (attendance) city, state
Exhibition
Oct 27, 2018*; 1:00 pm		Western New Mexico	W 66–45		Don Haskins Center; El Paso, TX
Nov 4, 2018*; 1:00 pm		St. Mary's (TX)	W 70–51		Don Haskins Center; El Paso, TX
Non-conference regular season
Nov 10, 2018*; 7:00 pm		Alcorn State	W 77–51	1–0	Don Haskins Center (886); El Paso, TX
Nov 14, 2018*; 7:00 pm		Cal State Bakersfield	W 53–47	2–0	Don Haskins Center (381); El Paso, TX
Nov 17, 2018*; 1:00 pm		New Mexico State; Battle of I-10	L 65–69	2–1	Don Haskins Center (597); El Paso, TX
Nov 23, 2018*; 3:30 pm		Nicholls; UTEP Thanksgiving Classic	L 56–58	2–2	Don Haskins Center (381); El Paso, TX
Nov 24, 2018*; 7:00 pm		Abilene Christian; UTEP Thanksgiving Classic	L 69–70	2–3	Don Haskins Center (983); El Paso, TX
Nov 28, 2018*; 7:00 pm		at Weber State	L 63–68	2–4	Dee Events Center (510); Ogden, UT
Dec 1, 2018*; 1:00 pm		Arkansas State	L 66–67	2–5	Don Haskins Center (381); El Paso, TX
Dec 5, 2018*; 7:00 pm		at New Mexico	L 51–69	2–6	Dreamstyle Arena (4,490); Albuquerque, NM
Dec 9, 2018*; 2:00 pm		Portland State	L 61–89	2–7	Don Haskins Center (276); El Paso, TX
Dec 17, 2018*; 6:30 pm		at Arizona	L 40–62	2–8	McKale Center (1,076); Tucson, AZ
Dec 20, 2018*; 3:30 pm		vs. Western Illinois; Las Vegas Holiday Hoops Classic	W 84–72	3–8	South Point Arena; Enterprise, NV
Dec 21, 2018*; 6:00 pm		vs. Akron; Las Vegas Holiday Hoops Classic	L 57–64	3–9	South Point Arena; Enterprise, NV
Dec 29, 2018*; 1:00 pm		at Tulsa	L 45–66	3–10	Reynolds Center (823); Tulsa, OK
Conference USA regular season
Jan 5, 2019; 1:00 pm, ESPN+		at UTSA	W 73–60	4–10 (1–0)	Convocation Center (450); San Antonio, TX
Jan 10, 2019; 6:00 pm		at North Texas	L 51–70	4–11 (1–1)	The Super Pit (533); Denton, TX
Jan 12, 2019; 1:00 pm		at Rice	L 42–76	4–12 (1–2)	Tudor Fieldhouse (661); Houston, TX
Jan 17, 2019; 7:00 pm		UAB	L 48–74	4–13 (1–3)	Don Haskins Center (459); El Paso, TX
Jan 19, 2019; 1:00 pm		Middle Tennessee	L 49–79	4–14 (1–4)	Don Haskins Center (485); El Paso, TX
Jan 24, 2019; 9:00 am		at Old Dominion	L 59–78	4–15 (1–5)	Ted Constant Convocation Center (6,314); Norfolk, VA
Jan 26, 2019; 2:00 pm		at Charlotte	L 39–62	4–16 (1–6)	Dale F. Halton Arena (901); Charlotte, NC
Jan 31, 2019; 7:00 pm		Marshall	L 52–64	4–17 (1–7)	Don Haskins Center (774); El Paso, TX
Feb 2, 2019; 1:00 pm		Western Kentucky	L 61–64	4–18 (1–8)	Don Haskins Center (429); El Paso, TX
Feb 7, 2019; 5:00 pm		at Florida Atlantic	W 70–44	5–18 (2–8)	FAU Arena (384); Boca Raton, FL
Feb 9, 2019; 12:00 pm		at FIU	W 60–55	6–18 (3–8)	Ocean Bank Convocation Center (221); Miami, FL
Feb 14, 2019; 7:00 pm		Louisiana Tech	L 64–74	6–19 (3–9)	Don Haskins Center (410); El Paso, TX
Feb 16, 2019; 1:00 pm		Southern Miss	L 63–64	6–20 (3–10)	Don Haskins Center (356); El Paso, TX
Feb 23, 2019; 1:00 pm, ESPN+		UTSA	W 77–73	7–20 (4–10)	Don Haskins Center (832); El Paso, TX
Mar 2, 2019; 1:00 pm		at UAB	L 45–68	7–21 (4–11)	Bartow Arena (698); Birmingham, AL
Mar 7, 2019; 7:00 pm, ESPN+		North Texas	W 59–51	8–21 (5–11)	Don Haskins Center (370); El Paso, TX
C-USA Women's Tournament
Mar 13, 2019; 1:00 pm, ESPN+	(11)	vs. (6) Marshall; First Round	W 64–56 ^{2OT}	9–21	The Ford Center at The Star (1,921); Frisco, TX
Mar 14, 2019; 1:00 pm, ESPN+	(11)	vs. (3) Middle Tennessee; Quarterfinals	L 44–66	9–22	The Ford Center at The Star; Frisco, TX
*Non-conference game. ^{#}Rankings from AP Poll. (#) Tournament seedings in parentheses. All times are in Mountain Time.

== Rankings ==
2018–19 NCAA Division I women's basketball rankings

Regular season polls
Poll	Pre- Season	Week 2	Week 3	Week 4	Week 5	Week 6	Week 7	Week 8	Week 9	Week 10	Week 11	Week 12	Week 13	Week 14	Week 15	Week 16	Week 17	Week 18	Week 19	Final
AP																				N/A
Coaches																				

Legend
	Increase in ranking
	Decrease in ranking
	No change
(RV)	Received votes
(NR)	Not ranked

== See also ==
2018–19 UTEP Miners men's basketball team
