= 2018–19 Rice Owls women's basketball team =

Intercollegiate basketball season

2018–19 Rice Owls women's basketball

C-USA regular season and tournament champions

NCAA tournament, first round
- Conference: Conference USA

Ranking
- AP: No. 21
- Record: 28–4 (16–0 C-USA)
- Head coach: Tina Langley (4th season)
- Assistant coaches: Winston Gandy; Lee Aduddell; Latara King
- Home arena: Tudor Fieldhouse

2018–19 Conference USA women's basketball standings
	Conf.				Overall
Team	W		L	PCT	W		L	PCT
No. 21 Rice †	16	–	0	1.000	28	–	4	.875
UAB	12	–	4	.750	26	–	7	.788
Middle Tennessee	11	–	5	.688	23	–	11	.676
Western Kentucky	11	–	5	.688	20	–	15	.571
Old Dominion	10	–	6	.625	21	–	11	.656
Marshall	10	–	6	.625	17	–	15	.531
Charlotte	9	–	7	.563	18	–	14	.563
Southern Miss	9	–	7	.563	18	–	14	.563
North Texas	7	–	9	.438	18	–	16	.529
Louisiana Tech	6	–	10	.375	14	–	16	.467
UTEP	5	–	11	.313	9	–	22	.290
UTSA	2	–	14	.125	7	–	21	.250
FIU	2	–	14	.125	5	–	24	.172
Florida Atlantic	2	–	14	.125	5	–	25	.167
† 2019 C-USA Tournament winner Rankings from AP poll

The 2018–19 Rice Owls women's basketball team represented Rice University during the 2018–19 NCAA Division I women's basketball season. The Owls, led by fourth-year head coach Tina Langley, played their home games at the Tudor Fieldhouse and were members of Conference USA. They finished the season 28–4, 16–0 in C-USA play to win the C-USA regular season championship. They also won the C-USA women's tournament to earn an automatic trip to the NCAA women's tournament, which was their first trip since 2005. They lost in the first round to Marquette in an overtime thriller. They finished the season with 28 wins, the most in school history.

On February 18, 2019, the Owls entered the AP Top 25 at No. 25. This was their' first time being ranked in the AP Poll in program history. Rice won the Conference USA tournament championship game over Middle Tennessee, 69–54. Nancy Mulkey was named the tournament's Most Valuable Player.

== Roster ==
2018–19 Rice Owls women's basketball team
Players
Coaches

Pos.	#	Name	Height	Year	Previous school	Hometown
G	1	Tayler Bennett	5 ft 7 in (1.7 m)	Jr	St. Anthony HS	Long Beach, CA
G	2	Sydne Wiggins	5 ft 11 in (1.8 m)	So	Harrison HS	Powder Springs, GA
G	5	Lauren Grigsby	5 ft 10 in (1.78 m)	Sr	Dekaney HS	Spring, TX
G	10	Jasmine Smith	5 ft 7 in (1.7 m)	Fr	The Kinkaid School	Cypress, TX
G	11	Haylee Swayze	5 ft 11 in (1.8 m)	Fr	Purcell HS	Purcell, OK
G	13	Erica Ogwumike	5 ft 9 in (1.75 m)	RS Jr	Cypress Woods HS; Pepperdine	Cypress, TX
G	20	Shani Rainey	5 ft 10 in (1.78 m)	RS Sr	Lovejoy HS	Fairview, TX
C	21	Arianna McCurry	6 ft 6 in (1.98 m)	Fr	Roseville HS	Roseville, CA
G/F	22	Nicole Iademarco	6 ft 1 in (1.85 m)	RS Sr	The Woodlands HS; Arizona State	The Woodlands, TX
C	23	Alexah Chrisman	6 ft 2 in (1.88 m)	So	McAuley HS	Lawrenceburg, IN
C	24	Temi Alao	5 ft 10 in (1.78 m)	RS Fr	Allen HS	Allen, TX
G	25	Kendall Ellig	5 ft 7 in (1.7 m)	RS So	Liberty Christian School	Flower Mound, TX
F	30	Olivia Ogwumike	5 ft 11 in (1.8 m)	RS Sr	Cypress Woods HS; Pepperdine	Cypress, TX
C	32	Nancy Mulkey	6 ft 9 in (2.06 m)	RS So	Cypress Woods HS; Oklahoma	Cypress, TX

Head coach

- Tina Langley (West Alabama)

Assistant coach(es)

- Winston Gandy (Maryland)
- Lee Aduddell (Abilene Christian)
- Latara King (Florida Memorial)

Legend

- (C) Team captain
- (S) Suspended
- (I) Ineligible
- (W) Walk-on
- Injured
- Current redshirt

Roster

== Schedule ==
Date time, TV	Rank^{#}	Opponent^{#}	Result	Record	Site (attendance) city, state
Non-conference regular season
Nov 7, 2018*; 6:00 pm		at No. 20 Texas A&M	L 54–65	0–1	Reed Arena (4,043); College Station, TX
Nov 11, 2018*; 4:00 pm		at UCLA	L 50–59	0–2	Pauley Pavilion (1,353); Los Angeles, CA
Nov 17, 2018*; 2:00 pm		at Little Rock	W 79–65	1–2	Jack Stephens Center (818); Little Rock, AR
Nov 20, 2018*; 7:00 pm		Texas Southern	W 76–71	2–2	Tudor Fieldhouse (529); Houston, TX
Nov 23, 2018*; 2:00 pm		Georgia State	W 66–49	3–2	Tudor Fieldhouse (383); Houston, TX
Nov 25, 2018*; 2:00 pm		McNeese State	W 93–65	4–2	Tudor Fieldhouse (380); Houston, TX
Dec 1, 2018*; 2:00 pm		New Orleans	W 67–56	5–2	Tudor Fieldhouse (1,621); Houston, TX
Dec 8, 2018*; 3:00 pm		at Prairie View A&M	W 68–58	6–2	William Nicks Building (240); Prairie View, TX
Dec 15, 2018*; 4:00 pm, ESPN3		SMU	W 66–52	7–2	Tudor Fieldhouse (2,152); Houston, TX
Dec 18, 2018*; 7:30 pm		vs. North Carolina; Carolinas Challenge	L 50–71	7–3	Myrtle Beach Convention Center; Myrtle Beach, SC
Dec 20, 2018*; 7:30 pm		vs. Coastal Carolina; Carolinas Challenge	W 56–52	8–3	Myrtle Beach Convention Center; Myrtle Beach, SC
Dec 29, 2018*; 1:00 pm		at Incarnate Word	W 74–63	9–3	McDermott Convocation Center (247); San Antonio, TX
Conference USA regular season
Jan 3, 2019; 6:00 pm		at Southern Miss	W 58–47	10–3 (1–0)	Reed Green Coliseum (982); Hattiesburg, MS
Jan 5, 2019; 2:00 pm, ESPN+		at Louisiana Tech	W 61–51	11–3 (2–0)	Thomas Assembly Center (1,073); Ruston, LA
Jan 10, 2019; 7:00 pm		UTSA	W 85–54	12–3 (3–0)	Tudor Fieldhouse (679); Houston, TX
Jan 12, 2019; 2:00 pm		UTEP	W 76–42	13–3 (4–0)	Tudor Fieldhouse (661); Houston, TX
Jan 19, 2019; 2:00 pm, ESPN3		North Texas	W 64–52	14–3 (5–0)	Tudor Fieldhouse (774); Houston, TX
Jan 24, 2019; 6:30 pm, ESPN+		at Middle Tennessee	W 60–47	15–3 (6–0)	Murphy Center (4,053); Murfreesboro, TN
Jan 26, 2019; 2:00 pm		at UAB	W 55–43	16–3 (7–0)	Bartow Arena (635); Birmingham, AL
Jan 31, 2019; 7:00 pm, ESPN+		Charlotte	W 61–51	17–3 (8–0)	Tudor Fieldhouse (502); Houston, TX
Feb 2, 2019; 2:00 pm, ESPN3		Old Dominion	W 48–42	18–3 (9–0)	Tudor Fieldhouse (737); Houston, TX
Feb 7, 2019; 6:00 pm		at Western Kentucky	W 68–46	19–3 (10–0)	E. A. Diddle Arena (1,347); Bowling Green, KY
Feb 9, 2019; 11:00 am		at Marshall	W 79–67	20–3 (11–0)	Cam Henderson Center (1,042); Huntington, WV
Feb 14, 2019; 7:00 pm, beIN		FIU	W 76–44	21–3 (12–0)	Tudor Fieldhouse (654); Houston, TX
Feb 14, 2019; 2:00 pm		Florida Atlantic	W 63–35	22–3 (13–0)	Tudor Fieldhouse (755); Houston, TX
Feb 23, 2019; 2:00 pm, ESPN+	No. 25	at North Texas	W 59–47	23–3 (14–0)	The Super Pit (751); Denton, TX
Mar 2, 2019; 2:00 pm, ESPN+	No. 24	Louisiana Tech	W 78–42	24–3 (15–0)	Tudor Fieldhouse (2,606); Houston, TX
Mar 7, 2019; 7:00 pm, ESPN+	No. 24	at UTSA	W 72–46	25–3 (16–0)	Convocation Center (579); San Antonio, TX
Conference USA Women's Tournament
Mar 14, 2019; 11:00 am, ESPN+	(1) No. 24	vs. (9) North Texas; Quarterfinals	W 61–43	26–3	The Ford Center at The Star; Frisco, TX
Mar 15, 2019; 5:30 pm, Stadium	(1) No. 24	vs. (4) Western Kentucky; Semifinals	W 64–57	27–3	The Ford Center at The Star; Frisco, TX
Mar 16, 2019; 4:30 pm, CBSSN	(1) No. 24	vs. (3) Middle Tennessee; Championship Game	W 69–54	28–3	The Ford Center at The Star; Frisco, TX
NCAA Women's Tournament
Mar 22, 2019*; 1:00 pm, ESPN2	(12 C) No. 24	vs. (5 C) No. 18 Marquette; First Round	L 54–58 ^{OT}	28–4	Reed Arena; College Station, TX
*Non-conference game. ^{#}Rankings from AP Poll. (#) Tournament seedings in parentheses. C=Chicago Region. All times are in Central Time.

== Rankings ==
Regular season polls
Poll	Pre- season	Week 2	Week 3	Week 4	Week 5	Week 6	Week 7	Week 8	Week 9	Week 10	Week 11	Week 12	Week 13	Week 14	Week 15	Week 16	Week 17	Week 18	Week 19	Final
AP													RV	RV	RV	25	24	24	24	21
Coaches																RV	RV	RV	RV	RV

Legend
	Increase in ranking
	Decrease in ranking
	No change
(RV)	Received votes
(NR)	Not ranked

== See also ==
- 2018–19 Rice Owls men's basketball team
