= 2018–19 FIU Panthers women's basketball team =

Intercollegiate basketball season

2018–19 FIU Panthers women's basketball
- Conference: Conference USA
- Record: 5–24 (2–14 C-USA)
- Head coach: Tiara Malcom (3rd season)
- Assistant coaches: Keunta Miles; Joe Silvestri; Gabe Lazo
- Home arena: FIU Arena

2018–19 Conference USA women's basketball standings
	Conf.				Overall
Team	W		L	PCT	W		L	PCT
No. 21 Rice †	16	–	0	1.000	28	–	4	.875
UAB	12	–	4	.750	26	–	7	.788
Middle Tennessee	11	–	5	.688	23	–	11	.676
Western Kentucky	11	–	5	.688	20	–	15	.571
Old Dominion	10	–	6	.625	21	–	11	.656
Marshall	10	–	6	.625	17	–	15	.531
Charlotte	9	–	7	.563	18	–	14	.563
Southern Miss	9	–	7	.563	18	–	14	.563
North Texas	7	–	9	.438	18	–	16	.529
Louisiana Tech	6	–	10	.375	14	–	16	.467
UTEP	5	–	11	.313	9	–	22	.290
UTSA	2	–	14	.125	7	–	21	.250
FIU	2	–	14	.125	5	–	24	.172
Florida Atlantic	2	–	14	.125	5	–	25	.167
† 2019 C-USA Tournament winner Rankings from AP poll

The 2018–19 FIU Panthers women's basketball team represented Florida International University during the 2018–19 NCAA Division I women's basketball season. The Panthers, led by third year head coach Tiara Malcom, played their home games at FIU Arena, and were members of Conference USA. They finished the season 5–24, 2–14 in Conference USA play to finish in a 3 way tie for twelfth place. Due to a tie breaker loss to Florida Atlantic and UTSA, they failed to qualify for the Conference USA women's tournament.

== Roster ==
2018–19 FIU Panthers women's basketball team
Players
Coaches

Pos.	#	Name	Height	Year	Previous school	Hometown
G	0	TaMiracle Taylor	5 ft 8 in (1.73 m)	So	Fort Lauderdale HS	Fort Lauderdale, FL
G	2	Cabria Lee	5 ft 8 in (1.73 m)	So	Northeast HS	Lake Worth, FL
G	10	Paula Orenes	5 ft 8 in (1.73 m)	Jr	La Salle Montcada; Casper College	Barcelona, Spain
F	12	Kylee O'Hara	6 ft 0 in (1.83 m)	RS Fr	Henry Street HS	Ajax, ON
C	14	Chelsea Guimaraes	6 ft 3 in (1.91 m)	RS Jr	Professor José Augusto Lucas; Georgia Tech	Almada, Portugal
F	15	Ieva Spigule	6 ft 0 in (1.83 m)	Jr	Riga State German Grammar School; Eastern Florida State College	Riga, Lativia
F	21	Ce'Nara Skanes	6 ft 0 in (1.83 m)	Fr	Putnam City West HS	Oklahoma City, OK
G	23	Bre'Osha Scott	5 ft 6 in (1.68 m)	Jr	Lakeview Centennial HS; Paris JC/Lamar	Garland, TX
G	30	Jiselle Thomas (redshirt)	5 ft 9 in (1.75 m)	So	Norwalk HS; High Point	Norwalk, OH
F	34	Shante Walker	5 ft 11 in (1.8 m)	So	South Broward HS	West Park, FL

Head coach

- Tiara Malcom (Delaware)

Assistant coach(es)

- Keunta Miles (North Florida)
- Joe Silvestri (Central Florida)
- Gabe Lazo (Barry)

Legend

- (C) Team captain
- (S) Suspended
- (I) Ineligible
- (W) Walk-on
- Injured
- Current redshirt

Roster

== Schedule ==
Date time, TV	Rank^{#}	Opponent^{#}	Result	Record	Site (attendance) city, state
Non-conference regular season
Nov 6, 2018*; 7:00 pm, ESPN+		No. 25 Miami (FL)	L 43–94	0–1	Ocean Bank Convocation Center (687); Miami, FL
Nov 9, 2018*; 5:00 pm		Palm Beach Atlantic	L 63–66	0–2	Ocean Bank Convocation Center (239); Miami, FL
Nov 12, 2018*; 7:00 pm		Georgia State	L 61–67	0–3	Ocean Bank Convocation Center (301); Miami, FL
Nov 16, 2018*; 5:00 pm, ESPN+		at Florida Gulf Coast	L 58–100	0–4	Alico Arena (1,869); Fort Myers, FL
Nov 20, 2018*; 5:00 pm		at Bethune–Cookman	L 57–68	0–5	Moore Gymnasium (407); Daytona Beach, FL
Nov 23, 2018*; 12:00 pm		Florida A&M; FIU Thanksgiving Tournament semifinals	W 77–54	1–5	Ocean Bank Convocation Center; Miami, FL
Nov 25, 2018*; 2:00 pm		Campbell; FIU Thanksgiving Tournament championship	L 54–59	1–6	Ocean Bank Convocation Center; Miami, FL
Dec 2, 2018*; 2:00 pm		Morgan State	W 59–50	2–6	Ocean Bank Convocation Center; Miami, FL
Dec 11, 2018*; 7:00 pm, ESPN+		at North Florida	L 53–62	2–7	UNF Arena (257); Jacksonville, FL
Dec 15, 2018*; 2:00 pm		Howard	L 62–89	2–8	Ocean Bank Convocation Center; Miami, FL
Dec 20, 2018*; 12:00 pm		Alcorn State; FIU Holiday Tournament semifinals	W 75–40	3–8	Ocean Bank Convocation Center; Miami, FL
Dec 21, 2018*; 2:00 pm		South Alabama; FIU Holiday Tournament championship game	L 77–84 ^{2OT}	3–9	Ocean Bank Convocation Center; Miami, FL
Dec 30, 2018*; 2:00 pm		Jacksonville	L 62–73	3–10	Ocean Bank Convocation Center; Miami, FL
Conference USA regular season
Jan 3, 2019; 7:00 pm		Middle Tennessee	L 43–49	3–11 (0-1)	Ocean Bank Convocation Center; Miami, FL
Jan 5, 2019; 2:00 pm		UAB	L 59–83	3–12 (0–2)	Ocean Bank Convocation Center; Miami, FL
Jan 10, 2019; 7:00 pm, beIN		at Charlotte	L 54–69	3–13 (0–3)	Dale F. Halton Arena (830); Charlotte, NC
Jan 12, 2019; 4:00 pm		at Old Dominion	L 68–95	3–14 (0–4)	Ted Constant Convocation Center (1,537); Norfolk, VA
Jan 17, 2019; 11:00 am, beIN		Western Kentucky	L 82–94	3–15 (0–5)	Ocean Bank Convocation Center (1,383); Miami, FL
Jan 19, 2019; 2:00 pm		Marshall	L 58–86	3–16 (0–6)	Ocean Bank Convocation Center (248); Miami, FL
Jan 26, 2019; 2:00 pm, ESPN+		at Florida Atlantic	L 55–77	3–17 (0–7)	FAU Arena (370); Boca Raton, FL
Jan 31, 2019; 7:00 pm		at Southern Miss	L 57–71	3–18 (0–8)	Reed Green Coliseum (1,150); Hattiesburg, MS
Feb 2, 2019; 3:00 pm		at Louisiana Tech	L 72–90	3–19 (0–9)	Thomas Assembly Center (1,475); Ruston, LA
Feb 7, 2019; 11:00 am		UTSA	W 51–40	4–19 (1–9)	Ocean Bank Convocation Center (643); Miami, FL
Feb 9, 2019; 2:00 pm		UTEP	L 55–60	4–20 (1–10)	Ocean Bank Convocation Center (221); Miami, FL
Feb 14, 2019; 8:00 pm, beIN		at Rice	L 44–76	4–21 (1–11)	Tudor Fieldhouse (654); Houston, TX
Feb 16, 2019; 4:00 pm		at North Texas	L 50–75	4–22 (1–12)	The Super Pit (508); Denton, TX
Feb 23, 2019; 2:00 pm, ESPN+		Florida Atlantic	W 56–49	5–22 (2–12)	Ocean Bank Convocation Center (464); Miami, FL
Mar 2, 2019; 2:00 pm		Charlotte	L 53–62	5–23 (2–13)	Ocean Bank Convocation Center (327); Miami, FL
Mar 7, 2019; 6:00 pm		at Marshall	L 42–87	5–24 (2–14)	Cam Henderson Center (1,082); Huntington, WV
*Non-conference game. ^{#}Rankings from AP Poll. (#) Tournament seedings in parentheses. All times are in Eastern Time.

== See also ==
2018–19 FIU Panthers men's basketball team
