= 2018–19 Florida Atlantic Owls women's basketball team =

Intercollegiate basketball season

2018–19 Florida Atlantic Owls women's basketball
- Conference: Conference USA
- Record: 5–25 (2–14 C-USA)
- Head coach: Jim Jabir (2nd season)
- Assistant coaches: Kachine Alexander; Terry Primm; Desma Thomas Bateast
- Home arena: FAU Arena

2018–19 Conference USA women's basketball standings
	Conf.				Overall
Team	W		L	PCT	W		L	PCT
No. 21 Rice †	16	–	0	1.000	28	–	4	.875
UAB	12	–	4	.750	26	–	7	.788
Middle Tennessee	11	–	5	.688	23	–	11	.676
Western Kentucky	11	–	5	.688	20	–	15	.571
Old Dominion	10	–	6	.625	21	–	11	.656
Marshall	10	–	6	.625	17	–	15	.531
Charlotte	9	–	7	.563	18	–	14	.563
Southern Miss	9	–	7	.563	18	–	14	.563
North Texas	7	–	9	.438	18	–	16	.529
Louisiana Tech	6	–	10	.375	14	–	16	.467
UTEP	5	–	11	.313	9	–	22	.290
UTSA	2	–	14	.125	7	–	21	.250
FIU	2	–	14	.125	5	–	24	.172
Florida Atlantic	2	–	14	.125	5	–	25	.167
† 2019 C-USA Tournament winner Rankings from AP poll

The 2018–19 Florida Atlantic Owls women's basketball team represented Florida Atlantic University during the 2018–19 NCAA Division I women's basketball season. The Owls, led by second-year head coach Jim Jabir, played their home games at FAU Arena in Boca Raton, Florida as members of Conference USA (C-USA). They finished the season 5–25, 2–14 in C-USA play, to finish in a three-way tie for 12th place. They lost in the first round of the C-USA women's tournament to Old Dominion.

== Roster ==
2018–19 Florida Atlantic Owls women's basketball team
Players
Coaches

Pos.	#	Name	Height	Year	Previous school	Hometown
G	0	Danneal Ford	5 ft 9 in (1.75 m)	RS Sr	Norland	Miami, FL
G	3	Jamaria Williams	5 ft 5 in (1.65 m)	Sr	North Lawndale College Prep HS; Miami Dade College	Chicago, IL
G	4	Tyana Robinson	5 ft 11 in (1.8 m)	RS So	Pike HS	Indianapolis, IN
G	5	Jayla Adams	5 ft 5 in (1.65 m)	Fr	Spruce Creek HS	Port Orange, FL
G	10	Glenisha Harkless	6 ft 0 in (1.83 m)	Fr	University Christian HS	Jacksonville, FL
F	12	Janae Thomas	6 ft 2 in (1.88 m)	Fr	Tampa Bay Technical HS	Gibsonton, FL
F	14	Abby Voss	6 ft 0 in (1.83 m)	Fr	Mount Notre Dame HS	Milford, OH
G	15	Addison Ryan	5 ft 9 in (1.75 m)	Fr	Wakeland HS	Frisco, TX
G	21	Myka Johnson Matthews	5 ft 8 in (1.73 m)	RS Jr	Bishop McNamara HS; Stetson	Upper Marlboro, MD
G	23	Alexis Cowan	5 ft 7 in (1.7 m)	Sr	Auburn HS; State Fair CC	Bolingbrook, IL
F	30	Juliette Gauthier	6 ft 1 in (1.85 m)	Fr	Montmorency College	Blainville, QC
F	31	Ra'Kyra Gabriel	6 ft 2 in (1.88 m)	Sr	Brookside Christian HS	Stockton, CA
F	32	Amber Gaston	6 ft 2 in (1.88 m)	Fr	Warren Central HS	Vicksburg, MS
G/F	33	Taylor Strawser	6 ft 0 in (1.83 m)	Fr	Herndon HS	Herndon, VA

Head coach

- Jim Jabir (Nazareth)

Assistant coach(es)

- Kachine Alexander (Iowa)
- Terry Primm (Palm Beach Atlantic)
- Desma Thomas Bateast (Miami (FL))

Legend

- (C) Team captain
- (S) Suspended
- (I) Ineligible
- (W) Walk-on
- Injured
- Current redshirt

Roster
Last update: February 17, 2025

== Schedule ==
Date time, TV	Rank^{#}	Opponent^{#}	Result	Record	Site (attendance) city, state
Exhibition
November 1, 2018*; 7:00 p.m.		Lynn	W 74–61		FAU Arena; Boca Raton, FL
Non-conference regular season
November 7, 2018*; 11:00 a.m.		Hampton	L 68–72	0–1	FAU Arena (1,182); Boca Raton, FL
November 10, 2018*; 12:00 p.m.		Georgia State	L 59–75	0–2	FAU Arena (560); Boca Raton, FL
November 14, 2018*; 7:30 p.m.		at Little Rock	L 38–61	0–3	Jack Stephens Center (842); Little Rock, AR
November 18, 2018*; 2:00 p.m.		Richmond	W 69–55	1–3	FAU Arena (555); Boca Raton, FL
November 23, 2018*; 12:00 p.m.		Lafayette; FAU Thanksgiving Tournament semifinals	W 53–49	2–3	FAU Arena (472); Boca Raton, FL
November 24, 2018*; 2:30 p.m.		Bradley; FAU Thanksgiving Tournament championship	L 59–80	2–4	FAU Arena (415); Boca Raton, FL
November 28, 2018*; 8:00 p.m.		at Tulane	L 45–88	2–5	Devlin Fieldhouse (580); New Orleans, LA
December 1, 2018*; 1:00 p.m., ESPN+		at Siena	W 70–66	3–5	Times Union Center (756); Albany, NY
December 12, 2018*; 7:00 p.m., ESPN+		at Furman	L 57–73	3–6	Timmons Arena (301); Greenville, SC
December 16, 2018*; 2:00 p.m.		Western Michigan	L 59–69	3–7	FAU Arena (340); Boca Raton, FL
December 20, 2018*; 7:00 p.m.		at No. 22 Michigan State	L 74–89	3–8	Breslin Center (4,393); East Lansing, MI
December 28, 2018*; 12:00 p.m.		North Carolina A&T; FAU Holiday Classic semifinals	L 65–67	3–9	FAU Arena (530); Boca Raton, FL
December 29, 2018*; 12:00 p.m.		Saint Louis; FAU Holiday Classic 3rd-place game	L 61–93	3–10	FAU Arena (354); Boca Raton, FL
Conference USA regular season
January 3, 2019; 7:00 p.m.		UAB	L 64–89	3–11 (0–1)	FAU Arena (345); Boca Raton, FL
January 5, 2019; 2:00 p.m., ESPN+		Middle Tennessee	L 55–74	3–12 (0–2)	FAU Arena (364); Boca Raton, FL
January 10, 2019; 6:30 p.m.		at Old Dominion	L 53–87	3–13 (0–3)	Ted Constant Convocation Center (1,396); Norfolk, VA
January 12, 2019; 4:00 p.m.		at Charlotte	L 47–68	3–14 (0–4)	Dale F. Halton Arena (863); Charlotte, NC
January 17, 2019; 7:00 p.m.		Marshall	L 67–72	3–15 (0–5)	FAU Arena (388); Boca Raton, FL
January 19, 2019; 2:00 p.m.		Western Kentucky	L 50–81	3–16 (0–6)	FAU Arena (368); Boca Raton, FL
January 26, 2019; 2:00 p.m., ESPN+		FIU	W 77–55	4–16 (1–6)	FAU Arena (370); Boca Raton, FL
January 31, 2019; 7:30 p.m.		at Louisiana Tech	L 55–86	4–17 (1–7)	Thomas Assembly Center (1,534); Ruston, LA
February 2, 2019; 4:00 p.m.		at Southern Miss	L 57–71	4–18 (1–8)	Reed Green Coliseum (1,150); Hattiesburg, MS
February 7, 2019; 7:00 p.m.		UTEP	L 44–70	4–19 (1–9)	FAU Arena (384); Boca Raton, FL
February 9, 2019; 2:00 p.m.		UTSA	W 86–70	5–19 (2–9)	FAU Arena (356); Boca Raton, FL
February 14, 2019; 8:00 p.m.		at North Texas	L 62–82	5–20 (2–10)	The Super Pit (490); Denton, TX
February 16, 2019; 3:00 p.m.		at Rice	L 35–63	5–21 (2–11)	Tudor Fieldhouse (755); Houston, TX
February 23, 2019; 2:00 p.m., ESPN+		at FIU	L 49–56	5–22 (2–12)	Ocean Bank Convocation Center (464); Miami, FL
March 2, 2019; 6:00 p.m.		at Middle Tennessee	L 48–74	5–23 (2–13)	Murphy Center (4,044); Murfreesboro, TN
March 7, 2019; 7:00 p.m.		Old Dominion	L 64–68	5–24 (2–14)	FAU Arena (388); Boca Raton, FL
Conference USA women's tournament
March 13, 2019; 12:30 p.m., ESPN+	(12)	vs. (5) Old Dominion; First round	L 32–60	5–25	The Ford Center at The Star; Frisco, TX
*Non-conference game. ^{#}Rankings from AP poll. (#) Tournament seedings in parentheses. All times are in Eastern.

== See also ==
- 2018–19 Florida Atlantic Owls men's basketball team
