= 2018–19 UAB Blazers women's basketball team =

Intercollegiate basketball season

2018–19 UAB Blazers women's basketball

FGCU Hilton Inn Garden Classic Champions

WNIT, Second Round
- Conference: Conference USA
- Record: 26–7 (12–4 C-USA)
- Head coach: Randy Norton (6th season)
- Assistant coaches: Taren Martin; Reagan Miller; Dodie Dunson II
- Home arena: Bartow Arena

2018–19 Conference USA women's basketball standings
	Conf.				Overall
Team	W		L	PCT	W		L	PCT
No. 21 Rice †	16	–	0	1.000	28	–	4	.875
UAB	12	–	4	.750	26	–	7	.788
Middle Tennessee	11	–	5	.688	23	–	11	.676
Western Kentucky	11	–	5	.688	20	–	15	.571
Old Dominion	10	–	6	.625	21	–	11	.656
Marshall	10	–	6	.625	17	–	15	.531
Charlotte	9	–	7	.563	18	–	14	.563
Southern Miss	9	–	7	.563	18	–	14	.563
North Texas	7	–	9	.438	18	–	16	.529
Louisiana Tech	6	–	10	.375	14	–	16	.467
UTEP	5	–	11	.313	9	–	22	.290
UTSA	2	–	14	.125	7	–	21	.250
FIU	2	–	14	.125	5	–	24	.172
Florida Atlantic	2	–	14	.125	5	–	25	.167
† 2019 C-USA Tournament winner Rankings from AP poll

The 2018–19 UAB Blazers women's basketball team represented the University of Alabama at Birmingham during the 2018–19 NCAA Division I women's basketball season. The Blazers, led by sixth-year head coach Randy Norton, played their home games at the Bartow Arena and were members of Conference USA. They finished the season 26–7, 12–4 in C-USA play to finish in second place. They advanced to the semifinals of the C-USA women's tournament, where they lost to Middle Tennessee. They received an automatic bid to the Women's National Invitation Tournament, where they defeated Troy in the first round before losing to Arkansas in the second round.

== Roster ==
2018–19 UAB Blazers women's basketball team
Players
Coaches

Pos.	#	Name	Height	Year	Previous school	Hometown
G	0	Miyah Barnes	5 ft 5 in (1.65 m)	Jr	Central HS	Memphis, TN
G	1	Margaret Whitley	5 ft 8 in (1.73 m)	Fr	Geneva HS	Geneva, IL
G	3	Angela Vendrell	6 ft 2 in (1.88 m)	Jr	CB Claret Benimaclet	Alicante, Spain
F	4	Talia Roldan	6 ft 4 in (1.93 m)	So	Andrean	Griffith, IN
G	5	Emily Frasco	5 ft 11 in (1.8 m)	Fr	Prospect HS	Mount Prospect, IL
F	10	Sara Rosenfeldt	6 ft 0 in (1.83 m)	Fr	St. Charles East HS	St. Charles, IL
G	12	Trista Magee	6 ft 1 in (1.85 m)	RS Jr	Presbyterian Christian; Alabama	Ellisville, MS
F	13	Katelynn Thomas	6 ft 0 in (1.83 m)	Jr	Shades Valley HS	Birmingham, AL
G	20	Deanna Kuzmanic	5 ft 9 in (1.75 m)	Sr	Wheeling HS	Wheeling, IL
G	22	Maya Garland	5 ft 6 in (1.68 m)	RS Sr	Fenwick HS	River Forest, IL
G	23	Lea Kerstein	5 ft 8 in (1.73 m)	RS So	Montini Catholic HS	West Chicago, IL
G	24	Audrey Jordan	5 ft 10 in (1.78 m)	Fr	Carl Harrison HS	Kennesaw, GA
G	32	Rachael Childress	5 ft 10 in (1.78 m)	Jr	Lawrence County HS	Moulton, AL
F	34	Imani Johnson	6 ft 0 in (1.83 m)	Jr	Desoto Central HS	Southaven, MS

Head coach

- Randy Norton (Iowa)

Assistant coach(es)

- Taren Martin (Illinois State)
- Reagan Miller (Liberty)
- Dodie Dunson II (Iowa State)

Legend

- (C) Team captain
- (S) Suspended
- (I) Ineligible
- (W) Walk-on
- Injured
- Current redshirt

Roster

== Schedule ==
Date time, TV	Rank^{#}	Opponent^{#}	Result	Record	Site (attendance) city, state
Exhibition
10/30/2018*; 6:00 pm		Miles	W 95–53		Bartow Arena; Birmingham, AL
11/03/2018*; 12:00 pm		Young Harris	W 101–37		Bartow Arena; Birmingham, AL
Non-conference regular season
11/09/2018*; 6:00 pm		Appalachian State	W 80–61	1–0	Bartow Arena (301); Birmingham, AL
11/15/2018*; 6:00 pm		Memphis	W 85–54	2–0	Bartow Arena (352); Birmingham, AL
11/20/2018*; 12:00 pm		at Chicago State	W 90–45	3–0	Jones Convocation Center (350); Chicago, IL
11/22/2018*; 5:15 pm		vs. Oklahoma; Junkanoo Jam Junkanoo Division semifinals	W 89–84	4–0	Gateway Christian Academy; Bimini, Bahamas
11/24/2018*; 1:00 pm		vs. No. 11 Tennessee; Junkanoo Jam Junkanoo Division championship	L 69–73 ^{OT}	4–1	Gateway Christian Academy (250); Bimini, Bahamas
11/28/2018*; 6:00 pm		Alabama A&M	W 82–47	5–1	Bartow Arena (327); Birmingham, AL
11/30/2018*; 6:00 pm		Alcorn State	W 80–53	6–1	Bartow Arena (349); Birmingham, AL
12/05/2018*; 6:00 pm		at Samford	W 66–41	7–1	Pete Hanna Center (402); Homewood, AL
12/08/2018*; 2:00 pm		McNeese State	W 91–48	8–1	Bartow Arena (303); Birmingham, AL
12/16/2018*; 3:00 pm		at Alabama State	W 62–47	9–1	Dunn–Oliver Acadome; Montgomery, AL
12/20/2018*; 4:00 pm		vs. Coppin State; FGCU Hilton Inn Garden Classic	W 86–61	10–1	Alico Arena; Fort Myers, FL
12/21/2018*; 6:00 pm		at Florida Gulf Coast; FGCU Hilton Inn Garden Classic	W 62–60	11–1	Alico Arena (1,721); Fort Myers, FL
12/30/2018*; 2:00 pm		Alabama–Huntsville	W 83–58	12–1	Bartow Arena (521); Birmingham, AL
Conference USA regular season
01/03/2019; 6:00 pm		at Florida Atlantic	W 89–64	13–1 (1–0)	FAU Arena (345); Boca Raton, FL
01/05/2019; 1:00 pm		at FIU	W 83–59	14–1 (2–0)	Ocean Bank Convocation Center; Miami, FL
01/10/2019; 6:00 pm, ESPN+		Louisiana Tech	L 68–73	14–2 (2–1)	Bartow Arena (582); Birmingham, AL
01/12/2019; 2:00 pm		Southern Miss	W 71–60	15–2 (3–1)	Bartow Arena (658); Birmingham, AL
01/17/2019; 7:00 pm		at UTEP	W 74–48	16–2 (4–1)	Don Haskins Center (459); El Paso, TX
01/19/2019; 1:00 pm		at UTSA	W 59–42	17–2 (5–1)	Convocation Center (460); San Antonio, TX
01/24/2019; 11:00 am		North Texas	W 70–60	18–2 (6–1)	Bartow Arena (988); Birmingham, AL
01/26/2019; 1:00 pm		Rice	L 43–55	18–3 (6–2)	Bartow Arena (635); Birmingham, AL
02/02/2018; 6:00 pm		at Middle Tennessee	L 44–60	18–4 (6–3)	Murphy Center (3,933); Murfreesboro, TN
02/07/2019; 5:30 pm, ESPN+		at Old Dominion	W 69–61	19–4 (7–3)	Ted Constant Convocation Center (1,560); Norfolk, VA
02/09/2019; 3:00 pm, ESPN+		at Charlotte	L 56–60	19–5 (7–4)	Dale F. Halton Arena (1,002); Charlotte, NC
02/14/2019; 6:00 pm		Marshall	W 77–59	20–5 (8–4)	Bartow Arena (401); Birmingham, AL
02/16/2019; 2:00 pm, ESPN+		Western Kentucky	W 70–63	21–5 (9–4)	Bartow Arena (634); Birmingham, AL
02/23/2019; 2:00 pm		Middle Tennessee	W 77–72 ^{OT}	22–5 (10–4)	Bartow Arena (487); Birmingham, AL
03/02/2019; 2:00 pm		UTEP	W 68–45	23–5 (11–4)	Bartow Arena (698); Birmingham, AL
03/07/2019; 6:30 pm, ESPN+		at Louisiana Tech	W 95–69	24–5 (12–4)	Thomas Assembly Center (1,683); Ruston, LA
Conference USA Women's Tournament
Mar 14, 2019; 1:30 pm, ESPN+	(2)	vs. (7) Charlotte; Quarterfinals	W 70–55	25–5	The Ford Center at The Star; Frisco, TX
Mar 14, 2019; 8:00 pm, Stadium	(2)	vs. (3) Middle Tennessee; Semifinals	L 65–75	25–6	The Ford Center at The Star (2,592); Frisco, TX
WNIT
Mar 21, 2019*; 6:00 pm		at Troy; First Round	W 93–89	26–6	Trojan Arena (2,451); Troy, AL
Mar 24, 2019*; 2:00 pm		at Arkansas; Second Round	L 52–100	26–7	Bud Walton Arena (3,939); Fayetteville, AR
*Non-conference game. ^{#}Rankings from AP Poll. (#) Tournament seedings in parentheses. All times are in Central Time.

== Rankings ==
Regular season polls
Poll	Pre- season	Week 2	Week 3	Week 4	Week 5	Week 6	Week 7	Week 8	Week 9	Week 10	Week 11	Week 12	Week 13	Week 14	Week 15	Week 16	Week 17	Week 18	Week 19	Final
AP																				N/A
Coaches				RV		RV	RV	RV	RV	RV	RV	RV								

Legend
	Increase in ranking
	Decrease in ranking
	Not ranked previous week
(RV)	Received votes
(NR)	Not ranked

== See also ==
- 2018–19 UAB Blazers men's basketball team
