= 2018–19 North Texas Mean Green women's basketball team =

Intercollegiate basketball season

2018–19 North Texas Mean Green women's basketball
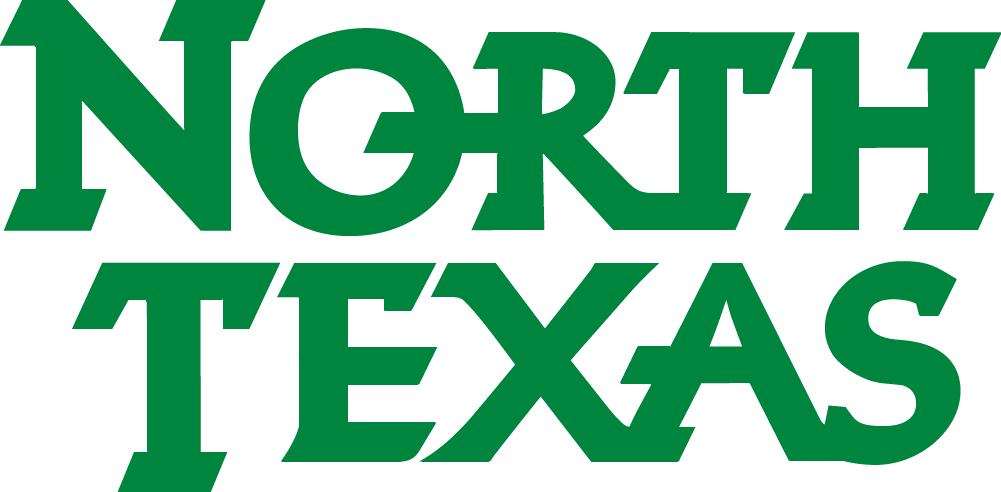

WBI, Runner Up
- Conference: Conference USA
- Record: 18–16 (7–9 C-USA)
- Head coach: Jalie Mitchell (4th season)
- Assistant coaches: Bobby Brasel; Carlos Knox; Kasondra Foreman
- Home arena: The Super Pit

2018–19 Conference USA women's basketball standings
	Conf.				Overall
Team	W		L	PCT	W		L	PCT
No. 21 Rice †	16	–	0	1.000	28	–	4	.875
UAB	12	–	4	.750	26	–	7	.788
Middle Tennessee	11	–	5	.688	23	–	11	.676
Western Kentucky	11	–	5	.688	20	–	15	.571
Old Dominion	10	–	6	.625	21	–	11	.656
Marshall	10	–	6	.625	17	–	15	.531
Charlotte	9	–	7	.563	18	–	14	.563
Southern Miss	9	–	7	.563	18	–	14	.563
North Texas	7	–	9	.438	18	–	16	.529
Louisiana Tech	6	–	10	.375	14	–	16	.467
UTEP	5	–	11	.313	9	–	22	.290
UTSA	2	–	14	.125	7	–	21	.250
FIU	2	–	14	.125	5	–	24	.172
Florida Atlantic	2	–	14	.125	5	–	25	.167
† 2019 C-USA Tournament winner Rankings from AP poll

The 2018–19 North Texas Mean Green women's basketball team represented the University of North Texas during the 2018–19 NCAA Division I women's basketball season. The Mean Green, led by fourth year head coach Jalie Mitchell, played their home games UNT Coliseum, also known as The Super Pit, and were members of Conference USA. They finished the season 18–16, 7–9 in C-USA play to finish in ninth place. They advanced to the quarterfinals of the C-USA women's tournament, where they lost to Rice. They received an invitation of the WBI, where they defeated Texas–Rio Grande Valley, Utah State and North Alabama in the first round, quarterfinals and semifinals to advanced to the championship game where they lost Appalachian State.

== Roster ==
2018–19 North Texas Mean Green women's basketball team
Players
Coaches

Pos.	#	Name	Height	Year	Previous school	Hometown
G	0	Jasmyne Robinson	5 ft 8 in (1.73 m)	Fr	Bowie HS	Arlington, TX
G	1	Callie Owens	5 ft 10 in (1.78 m)	RS So	Plano West HS; Pacific	Plano, TX
G	2	Grance Goodhart	5 ft 9 in (1.75 m)	Sr	Sunnyvale HS; Loyola–Chicago	Sunnyvale, TX
G	3	Brittany Smith	5 ft 6 in (1.68 m)	Sr	Spring HS; South Plains College	Houston, TX
G	5	Velma Mitchell	5 ft 9 in (1.75 m)	Jr	Rockdale HS; McLennan CC	Rockdale, TX
G	10	Tatum Henderson	5 ft 10 in (1.78 m)	Fr	Martin HS	Arlington, TX
F	11	Charlene Shepherd	6 ft 2 in (1.88 m)	Fr	Showmaker HS	Killeen, TX
G	13	Orianna Shillow	5 ft 8 in (1.73 m)	Sr	Stony Point HS	Round Rock, TX
F	21	Deja Terrell	6 ft 1 in (1.85 m)	So	Life Oak Cliff HS	Dallas, TX
G	23	Terriell Bradley	5 ft 10 in (1.78 m)	RS Sr	Mansfield HS; Kansas	Arlington, TX
G	24	Trena Mims	5 ft 5 in (1.65 m)	So	Muskogee HS	Muskogee, OK
C	34	Micayla Buckner	6 ft 3 in (1.91 m)	RS Sr	Naaman Forest HS; Collin College	Garland, TX
F	41	Madison Townley	6 ft 0 in (1.83 m)	RS So	Duncanville HS	Duncanville, TX
C	42	Anisha George	6 ft 2 in (1.88 m)	Jr	St. Croix Central HS	St. Croix, Virgin Islands

Head coach

- Jalie Mitchell (North Texas)

Assistant coach(es)

- Bobby Brasel (UT Permian Basin)
- Carlos Knox (IUPUI)
- Kasondra Foreman (North Texas)

Legend

- (C) Team captain
- (S) Suspended
- (I) Ineligible
- (W) Walk-on
- Injured
- Current redshirt

Roster

== Schedule ==
Date time, TV	Rank^{#}	Opponent^{#}	Result	Record	Site (attendance) city, state
Exhibition
Nov 3, 2018*; 3:00 pm		Mary Hardin–Baylor	W 75–37		The Super Pit; Denton, TX
Non-conference regular Season
Nov 7, 2018*; 7:00 pm		Mid-America Christian	W 82–35	1–0	The Super Pit (564); Denton, TX
Nov 12, 2018*; 7:00 pm, ESPN+		No. 11 Texas	L 54–64	1–1	The Super Pit (2,497); Denton, TX
Nov 16, 2018*; 7:00 pm		at Kansas State	L 42–60	1–2	Bramlage Coliseum (2,861); Manhattan, KS
Nov 23, 2018*; 2:30 pm		vs. Wyoming; Tiger Turkey Tip Off	L 49–53	1–3	Alex G. Spanos Center (132); Stockton, CA
Nov 24, 2018*; 2:30 pm		vs. North Dakota State; Tiger Turkey Tip Off	W 92–78	2–3	Alex G. Spanos Center (133); Stockton, CA
Nov 23, 2018*; 7:00 pm		at SMU	L 66–73	2–4	Moody Coliseum (544); Dallas, TX
Dec 1, 2018*; 3:00 pm		Missouri State	W 83–76 ^{OT}	3–4	The Super Pit (1,377); Denton, TX
Dec 5, 2018*; 11:30 am		Houston Baptist	W 100–75	4–4	The Super Pit (2,531); Denton, TX
Dec 8, 2018*; 3:00 pm		Utah State	L 41–57	4–5	The Super Pit (597); Denton, TX
Dec 16, 2018*; 4:00 pm		at Xavier (LA)	W 59–46	5–5	Convocation Center (158); New Orleans, LA
Dec 21, 2018*; 7:00 pm		Cal State Bakersfield	W 71–59	6–5	The Super Pit (452); Denton, TX
Dec 29, 2018*; 3:00 pm		Oklahoma Panhandle State	W 93–52	7–5	The Super Pit (458); Denton, TX
Conference USA regular Season
Jan 3, 2019; 6:30 pm		at Louisiana Tech	W 65–54	8–5 (1–0)	Thomas Assembly Center (1,082); Ruston, LA
Jan 5, 2019; 4:00 pm		at Southern Miss	W 62–48	9–5 (2–0)	Reed Green Coliseum (1,231); Hattiesburg, MS
Jan 10, 2019; 7:00 pm		UTEP	W 70–51	10–5 (3–0)	The Super Pit (533); Denton, TX
Jan 12, 2019; 3:00 pm		UTSA	L 54–57	10–6 (3–1)	The Super Pit (802); Denton, TX
Jan 19, 2019; 2:00 pm, ESPN3		at Rice	L 52–64	10–7 (3–2)	Tudor Fieldhouse (774); Houston, TX
Jan 24, 2019; 11:00 am		at UAB	L 60–70	10–8 (3–3)	Bartow Arena (988); Birmingham, AL
Jan 26, 2019; 5:00 pm		at Middle Tennessee	L 46–61	10–9 (3–4)	Murphy Center (3,833); Murfreesboro, TN
Jan 31, 2019; 7:00 pm		Old Dominion	L 71–72	10–10 (3–5)	The Super Pit (651); Denton, TX
Feb 3, 2019; 3:00 pm		Charlotte	W 68–63	11–10 (4–5)	The Super Pit (926); Denton, TX
Feb 7, 2019; 5:00 pm, BeIN		at Marshall	L 55–67	11–11 (4–6)	Cam Henderson Center (660); Huntington, WV
Feb 9, 2019; 5:00 pm		at Western Kentucky	W 76–67	12–11 (5–6)	E. A. Diddle Arena (1,363); Bowling Green, KY
Feb 14, 2019; 7:00 pm		Florida Atlantic	W 82–62	13–11 (6–6)	The Super Pit (490); Denton, TX
Feb 16, 2019; 3:00 pm		FIU	W 75–50	14–11 (7–6)	The Super Pit (508); Denton, TX
Feb 23, 2019; 3:00 pm, ESPN+		No. 25 Rice	L 47–59	14–12 (7–7)	The Super Pit (751); Denton, TX
Mar 2, 2019; 3:00 pm		Western Kentucky	L 66–71	14–13 (7–8)	The Super Pit (658); Denton, TX
Mar 7, 2019; 7:00 pm		at UTEP	L 51–59	14–14 (7–9)	Don Haskins Center (370); El Paso, TX
Conference USA Women's Tournament
Mar 13, 2019; 11:00 am, ESPN+	(9)	vs. (8) Southern Miss; First Round	W 49–46	15–14	The Ford Center at The Star; Frisco, TX
Mar 14, 2019; 11:00 am, Stadium	(9)	vs. (1) No. 24 Rice; Quarterfinals	L 43–61	15–15	The Ford Center at The Star; Frisco, TX
WBI
Mar 20, 2019*; 7:00 pm		Texas–Rio Grande Valley; First Round	W 56–42	16–15	The Super Pit (389); Denton, TX
Mar 26, 2019*; 7:00 pm		Utah State; Quarterfinals	W 56–54	17–15	The Super Pit (506); Denton, TX
Mar 29, 2019*; 7:00 pm		North Alabama; Semifinals	W 56–53	18–15	The Super Pit (684); Denton, TX
Apr 3, 2019*; 5:30 pm, ESPN+		at Appalachian State; Finals	L 59–76	18–16	Holmes Center (1,823); Boone, NC
*Non-conference game. ^{#}Rankings from AP Poll. (#) Tournament seedings in parentheses. All times are in Central Time.

== See also ==
- 2018–19 North Texas Mean Green men's basketball team
