= 2018–19 Southern Miss Lady Eagles basketball team =

Intercollegiate basketball season

2018–19 Southern Miss Lady Eagles basketball

WBI, Quarterfinals
- Conference: Conference USA
- Record: 18–14 (9–7 C-USA)
- Head coach: Joye Lee-McNelis (15th season)
- Assistant coaches: Kiley Hill; Lauren Pittman; Patosha Jeffery
- Home arena: Reed Green Coliseum

2018–19 Conference USA women's basketball standings
| | Conf. | | | | Overall |
| Team | W | | L | PCT | W | | L | PCT |
|---|---|---|---|---|---|---|---|---|
| No. 21 Rice † | 16 | – | 0 | 1.000 | 28 | – | 4 | .875 |
| UAB | 12 | – | 4 | .750 | 26 | – | 7 | .788 |
| Middle Tennessee | 11 | – | 5 | .688 | 23 | – | 11 | .676 |
| Western Kentucky | 11 | – | 5 | .688 | 20 | – | 15 | .571 |
| Old Dominion | 10 | – | 6 | .625 | 21 | – | 11 | .656 |
| Marshall | 10 | – | 6 | .625 | 17 | – | 15 | .531 |
| Charlotte | 9 | – | 7 | .563 | 18 | – | 14 | .563 |
| Southern Miss | 9 | – | 7 | .563 | 18 | – | 14 | .563 |
| North Texas | 7 | – | 9 | .438 | 18 | – | 16 | .529 |
| Louisiana Tech | 6 | – | 10 | .375 | 14 | – | 16 | .467 |
| UTEP | 5 | – | 11 | .313 | 9 | – | 22 | .290 |
| UTSA | 2 | – | 14 | .125 | 7 | – | 21 | .250 |
| FIU | 2 | – | 14 | .125 | 5 | – | 24 | .172 |
| Florida Atlantic | 2 | – | 14 | .125 | 5 | – | 25 | .167 |
† 2019 C-USA Tournament winner Rankings from AP poll

The 2018–19 Southern Miss Lady Eagles basketball team represented the University of Southern Mississippi during the 2018–19 NCAA Division I women's basketball season. The Lady Eagles, led by fifteenth year head coach Joye Lee-McNelis, played their home games at Reed Green Coliseum and were members of Conference USA. They finished the season 18–14, 9–7 in C-USA play to finish in a tie for seventh place. They lost in the first round of the C-USA women's tournament to North Texas. They received an invitation to the WBI where they defeated Nicholls in the first round before losing to North Alabama in the quarterfinals.

== Roster ==
2018–19 Southern Miss Golden Eagles women's basketball team
Players
Coaches

| Pos. | # | Name | Height | Year | Previous school | Hometown |
|---|---|---|---|---|---|---|
| G | 0 | Camille Anderson | 5 ft 9 in (1.75 m) | RS Jr | Buford HS; NC State | Buford, GA |
| G | 2 | Allie Kennedy | 5 ft 6 in (1.68 m) | So | Red Bay HS | Bed Bay, AL |
| F | 3 | Shania Edgecombe | 6 ft 1 in (1.85 m) | Fr | Jena Ribault HS | Jacksonville, FL |
| G | 4 | Destiny Smith | 5 ft 11 in (1.8 m) | Fr | McComb HS | MccComb, MS |
| G | 5 | Shonte Hailes | 5 ft 6 in (1.68 m) | Jr | Quitman HS | Quitman, MS |
| G/F | 12 | Imani Carter | 6 ft 0 in (1.83 m) | So | Enterprise HS | Enterprise, AL |
| C | 15 | Amber Landing | 6 ft 4 in (1.93 m) | RS Jr | Madison-Ridgeland Academy; Little Rock | Sharon, MS |
| G | 21 | Daishai Almond | 5 ft 9 in (1.75 m) | Fr | Peach County HS | Athens, GA |
| G | 22 | Megan Brown | 5 ft 10 in (1.78 m) | RS Sr | Salmen HS | Slidell, LA |
| F | 24 | Kennedy Gavin | 6 ft 0 in (1.83 m) | So | Petal HS | Petal, MS |
| G/F | 25 | Alarie Mayze | 5 ft 10 in (1.78 m) | Jr | Arlington HS; New Mexico JC | Arlington, TX |
| F | 34 | Respect Leaphart | 6 ft 0 in (1.83 m) | Jr | Dunbar HS | Fort Myers, FL |
| C | 42 | Kelsey Jones | 6 ft 3 in (1.91 m) | RS Fr | Starkville HS | Starkville, MS |

Head coach

- Joye Lee-McNelis (Southern Miss)

Assistant coach(es)

- Kiley Hill (Arkansas Tech)
- Lauren Pittman (Southern Miss)
- Patosha Jeffery (Memphis)

Legend

- (C) Team captain
- (S) Suspended
- (I) Ineligible
- (W) Walk-on
- Injured
- Current redshirt

Roster

== Schedule ==
| Date time, TV | Rank^{#} | Opponent^{#} | Result | Record | Site (attendance) city, state |
Exhibition
| Oct 29, 2018*; 7:00 pm | | Mississippi College | W 65–36 | | Reed Green Coliseum; Hattiesburg, MS |
Non-conference regular season
| Nov 6, 2018*; 11:00 am | | William Carey | W 74–48 | 1–0 | Reed Green Coliseum (2,865); Hattiesburg, MS |
| Nov 11, 2018*; 2:00 pm | | Grambling State | W 68–47 | 2–0 | Reed Green Coliseum (1,211); Hattiesburg, MS |
| Nov 14, 2018*; 7:05 pm, ESPN+ | | at South Alabama | L 68–77 | 2–1 | Mitchell Center (781); Mobile, AL |
| Nov 18, 2018*; 2:00 pm | | Samford | W 76–40 | 3–1 | Reed Green Coliseum (1,137); Hattiesburg, MS |
| Nov 23, 2018*; 6:00 pm | | Mississippi Valley State; Lady Eagle Thanksgiving Classic | W 67–60 | 4–1 | Reed Green Coliseum (1,212); Hattiesburg, MS |
| Nov 24, 2018*; 4:00 pm | | Sam Houston State; Lady Eagle Thanksgiving Classic | L 61–65 | 4–2 | Reed Green Coliseum (1,180); Hattiesburg, MS |
| Nov 27, 2018*; 6:00 pm | | Northwestern State | W 69–54 | 5–2 | Reed Green Coliseum (1,143); Hattiesburg, MS |
| Dec 1, 2018*; 1:00 pm | | at Tulane | L 54–71 | 5–3 | Devlin Fieldhouse; New Orleans, LA |
| Dec 11, 2018*; 6:00 pm | | Alcorn State | W 66–47 | 6–3 | Reed Green Coliseum (1,312); Hattiesburg, MS |
| Dec 14, 2018*; 6:00 pm, ESPN+ | | No. 5 Mississippi State | L 42–86 | 6–4 | Reed Green Coliseum (4,448); Hattiesburg, MS |
| Dec 18, 2018*; 6:00 pm | | Blue Mountain | W 84–38 | 7–4 | Reed Green Coliseum (1,048); Hattiesburg, MS |
| Dec 20, 2018*; 6:00 pm | | at Southeastern Louisiana | W 59–52 | 8–4 | University Center (463); Hammond, LA |
| Dec 30, 2018*; 2:00 pm | | Houston | L 44–61 | 8–5 | Reed Green Coliseum (1,093); Hattiesburg, MS |
Conference USA regular season
| Jan 3, 2019; 6:00 pm | | Rice | L 47–58 | 8–6 (0–1) | Reed Green Coliseum (982); Hattiesburg, MS |
| Jan 5, 2019; 2:00 pm | | North Texas | L 48–62 | 8–7 (0–2) | Reed Green Coliseum (1,231); Hattiesburg, MS |
| Jan 10, 2019; 6:30 pm | | at Middle Tennessee | L 49–66 | 8–8 (0–3) | Murphy Center (3,987); Murfreesboro, TN |
| Jan 12, 2019; 2:00 pm | | at UAB | L 60–71 | 8–9 (0–4) | Bartow Arena (658); Birmingham, AL |
| Jan 17, 2019; 2:00 pm | | Charlotte | W 65–54 | 9–9 (1–4) | Reed Green Coliseum (1,200); Hattiesburg, MS |
| Jan 19, 2019; 4:00 pm | | Old Dominion | L 50–53 | 9–10 (1–5) | Reed Green Coliseum (1,099); Hattiesburg, MS |
| Jan 24, 2019; 7:00 pm | | at Western Kentucky | W 69–56 | 10–10 (2–5) | E. A. Diddle Arena (1,187); Bowling Green, KY |
| Jan 26, 2019; 12:00 pm | | at Marshall | W 64–52 | 11–10 (3–5) | Cam Henderson Center (774); Huntington, WV |
| Jan 31, 2019; 6:00 pm | | FIU | W 71–57 | 12–10 (4–5) | Reed Green Coliseum (1,150); Hattiesburg, MS |
| Feb 2, 2019; 4:00 pm | | Florida Atlantic | W 71–57 | 13–10 (5–5) | Reed Green Coliseum (1,150); Hattiesburg, MS |
| Feb 9, 2019; 1:00 pm | | at Louisiana Tech | L 85–106 | 13–11 (5–6) | Thomas Assembly Center (1,723); Ruston, LA |
| Feb 14, 2019; 7:00 pm | | at UTSA | W 70–45 | 14–11 (6–6) | Convocation Center (430); San Antonio, TX |
| Feb 16, 2019; 12:00 pm | | at UTEP | W 64–63 | 15–11 (7–6) | Don Haskins Center (356); El Paso, TX |
| Feb 23, 2019; 4:00 pm, ESPN+ | | Louisiana Tech | W 74–70 | 16–11 (8–6) | Reed Green Coliseum (4,456); Hattiesburg, MS |
| Mar 2, 2019; 4:00 pm | | UTSA | W 72–39 | 17–11 (9–6) | Reed Green Coliseum (1,171); Hattiesburg, MS |
| Mar 7, 2019; 6:00 pm | | at Charlotte | L 46–59 | 17–12 (9–7) | Dale F. Halton Arena (668); Charlotte, NC |
Conference USA Women's Tournament
| Mar 13, 2019; 11:00 am, ESPN+ | (8) | vs. (9) North Texas; First Round | L 46–49 | 17–13 | The Ford Center at The Star; Frisco, TX |
WBI
| Mar 21, 2019*; 6:00 pm | | Nicholls State; First Round | W 77–71 | 18–13 | Reed Green Coliseum (530); Hattiesburg, MS |
| Mar 25, 2019*; 6:00 pm | | North Alabama; Quarterfinals | L 65–69 ^{OT} | 18–14 | Reed Green Coliseum (626); Hattiesburg, MS |
*Non-conference game. ^{#}Rankings from AP Poll. (#) Tournament seedings in parentheses. All times are in Central Time.

== See also ==
2018–19 Southern Miss Golden Eagles basketball team
