= 2018–19 Louisiana Tech Lady Techsters basketball team =

Intercollegiate basketball season

2018–19 Louisiana Tech Lady Techsters basketball
- Conference: Conference USA
- Record: 14–16 (6–10 C-USA)
- Head coach: Brooke Stoehr & Scott Stoehr (3rd season)
- Assistant coaches: Lindsey Hicks; LaSondra Barrett
- Home arena: Thomas Assembly Center

2018–19 Conference USA women's basketball standings
	Conf.				Overall
Team	W		L	PCT	W		L	PCT
No. 21 Rice †	16	–	0	1.000	28	–	4	.875
UAB	12	–	4	.750	26	–	7	.788
Middle Tennessee	11	–	5	.688	23	–	11	.676
Western Kentucky	11	–	5	.688	20	–	15	.571
Old Dominion	10	–	6	.625	21	–	11	.656
Marshall	10	–	6	.625	17	–	15	.531
Charlotte	9	–	7	.563	18	–	14	.563
Southern Miss	9	–	7	.563	18	–	14	.563
North Texas	7	–	9	.438	18	–	16	.529
Louisiana Tech	6	–	10	.375	14	–	16	.467
UTEP	5	–	11	.313	9	–	22	.290
UTSA	2	–	14	.125	7	–	21	.250
FIU	2	–	14	.125	5	–	24	.172
Florida Atlantic	2	–	14	.125	5	–	25	.167
† 2019 C-USA Tournament winner Rankings from AP poll

The 2018–19 Louisiana Tech Lady Techsters basketball team represented Louisiana Tech University during the 2018–19 NCAA Division I women's basketball season. The Lady Techsters, led by third year co-head coaches Brooke Stoehr and Scott Stoehr, played their home games at Thomas Assembly Center and were members of Conference USA. They finished the season 14–16, 6–10 in C-USA play to finish in tenth place. They lost in the first round of the C-USA women's tournament to Charlotte.

== Roster ==
2018–19 Louisiana Tech Lady Techsters women's basketball team
Players
Coaches

Pos.	#	Name	Height	Year	Previous school	Hometown
G	1	Raizel Guinto	5 ft 7 in (1.7 m)	So	Sisler HS	Winnipeg, MB
G	2	Keiunna Walker	5 ft 6 in (1.68 m)	Fr	Lonoke HS	Lonoke, AR
G	3	Kierra Lang	5 ft 9 in (1.75 m)	Jr	Springdale HS	Springdale, AR
G	4	Kierra Anthony	5 ft 6 in (1.68 m)	Sr	New Iberia HS	New Iberia, LA
G	10	Amber Dixon	5 ft 9 in (1.75 m)	So	Mansfield Summit	Arlington, TX
G	12	Daria McCutcheon	5 ft 8 in (1.73 m)	Jr	Plano East HS	Plano, TX
F	21	Brianna Harris	6 ft 0 in (1.83 m)	Fr	Blount HS	Mobile, AL
G	22	Grayson Bright (redshirt)	5 ft 11 in (1.8 m)	Jr	Fossil Ridge; Texas Tech	Fort Worth, TX
F	23	Reauna Cleaver	6 ft 2 in (1.88 m)	Sr	Elizabethtown HS	Elizabethtown, KY
G	24	Taylor Stahly	5 ft 7 in (1.7 m)	Sr	Newton HS; Hutchinson CC	Newton, KS
G	25	Nikki McDonald	6 ft 0 in (1.83 m)	RS Jr	Wesleyan; Elon	Atlanta, GA
F	32	Zhanae Whitney	6 ft 0 in (1.83 m)	Sr	Colleville Heritage HS; Collin County	Queens, NY
F	34	DeAndre'a Alexander	6 ft 1 in (1.85 m)	Fr	Arcadia HS	Arcadia, LA

Head coach

- Brooke Stoehr (Louisiana Tech)
- Scott Stoehr (Little Rock)

Assistant coach(es)

- Lindsey Hicks (Purdue)
- LaSondra Barrett (LSU)

Legend

- (C) Team captain
- (S) Suspended
- (I) Ineligible
- (W) Walk-on
- Injured
- Current redshirt

Roster

== Schedule ==
Date time, TV	Rank^{#}	Opponent^{#}	Result	Record	Site city, state
Non-conference regular season
Nov 6, 2018*; 6:30 pm		LSU–Alexandria	W 112–70	1–0	Thomas Assembly Center (1,037); Ruston, LA
Nov 9, 2018*; 11:00 am		Little Rock	L 58–69	1–1	Thomas Assembly Center (5,027); Ruston, LA
Nov 14, 2018*; 6:30 pm		Houston	W 100–88 ^{OT}	2–1	Thomas Assembly Center (1,128); Ruston, LA
Nov 18, 2018*; 2:00 pm		at Memphis	W 66–50	3–1	Elma Roane Fieldhouse (709); Memphis, TN
Nov 20, 2018*; 7:00 pm		at Arkansas State	W 80–70	4–1	First National Bank Arena (681); Jonesboro, AR
Nov 24, 2018*; 6:30 pm		at Wichita State	L 56–70	4–2	Charles Koch Arena (1,638); Wichita, KS
Dec 1, 2018*; 2:00 pm, P12N		at No. 19 Arizona State; ASU Classic semifinals	L 44–80	4–3	Wells Fargo Arena (2,026); Tempe, AZ
Dec 2, 2018*; 12:30 pm		vs. Alabama; ASU Classic 3rd place game	W 79–62	5–3	Wells Fargo Arena; Tempe, AZ
Dec 12, 2018*; 6:30 pm		Southeastern Louisiana	W 72–53	6–3	Thomas Assembly Center (1,154); Ruston, LA
Dec 15, 2018*; 2:00 pm		Ole Miss	W 80–71	7–3	Thomas Assembly Center (1,527); Ruston, LA
Dec 20, 2018*; 6:30 pm		vs. Missouri State; Roo Holiday Classic	L 70–82	7–4	Swinney Recreation Center (322); Kansas City, MO
Dec 21, 2018*; 5:30 pm		at UMKC; Roo Holiday Classic	L 70–80	7–5	Swinney Recreation Center (656); Kansas City, MO
Dec 29, 2018*; 1:00 pm		at McNeese State	W 89–48	8–5	H&HP Complex (1,651); Lake Charles, LA
Conference USA regular season
Jan 3, 2019; 6:30 pm		North Texas	L 54–65	8–6 (0–1)	Thomas Assembly Center (1,082); Ruston, LA
Jan 5, 2019; 2:00 pm, ESPN+		Rice	L 51–61	8–7 (0–2)	Thomas Assembly Center (1,073); Ruston, LA
Jan 10, 2019; 6:00 pm, ESPN+		at UAB	W 73–68	9–7 (1–2)	Bartow Arena (582); Birmingham, AL
Jan 12, 2019; 6:00 pm, ESPN+		at Middle Tennessee	L 38–75	9–8 (1–3)	Murphy Center (4,127); Murfreesboro, TN
Jan 17, 2019; 6:30 pm		Old Dominion	L 59–70	9–9 (1–4)	Thomas Assembly Center (1,608); Ruston, LA
Jan 19, 2019; 2:00 pm		Charlotte	W 88–51	10–9 (2–4)	Thomas Assembly Center (1,477); Ruston, LA
Jan 24, 2019; 5:00 pm		at Marshall	L 88–90 ^{3OT}	10–10 (2–5)	Cam Henderson Center (711); Huntington, WV
Jan 26, 2019; 2:00 pm		at Western Kentucky	L 76–81	10–11 (2–6)	E. A. Diddle Arena (2,759); Bowling Green, KY
Jan 31, 2019; 6:30 pm		Florida Atlantic	W 86–55	11–11 (3–6)	Thomas Assembly Center (1,534); Ruston, LA
Feb 2, 2019; 2:00 pm		FIU	W 90–72	12–11 (4–6)	Thomas Assembly Center (1,475); Ruston, LA
Feb 9, 2019; 2:00 pm		Southern Miss	W 106–85	13–11 (5–6)	Thomas Assembly Center (1,723); Ruston, LA
Feb 14, 2019; 8:00 pm		at UTEP	W 74–64	14–11 (6–6)	Don Haskins Center (410); El Paso, TX
Feb 16, 2019; 2:00 pm		at UTSA	L 68–70	14–12 (6–7)	Convocation Center (705); San Antonio, TX
Feb 23, 2019; 4:00 pm, ESPN+		at Southern Miss	L 70–74	14–13 (6–8)	Reed Green Coliseum (4,456); Hattiesburg, MS
Mar 2, 2019; 2:00 pm, ESPN+		at No. 24 Rice	L 42–78	14–14 (6–9)	Tudor Fieldhouse (2,606); Houston, TX
Mar 7, 2019; 6:30 pm, ESPN+		UAB	L 69–95	14–15 (6–10)	Thomas Assembly Center (1,683); Ruston, LA
Conference USA Women's Tournament
Mar 13, 2019; 1:30 pm, ESPN+	(10)	vs. (7) Charlotte; First Round	L 46–55	14–16	The Ford Center at The Star (1,921); Frisco, TX
*Non-conference game. ^{#}Rankings from AP Poll. (#) Tournament seedings in parentheses. All times are in Central Time.

== See also ==
2018–19 Louisiana Tech Bulldogs basketball team
