= 2018–19 Middle Tennessee Blue Raiders women's basketball team =

Intercollegiate basketball season

2018–19 Middle Tennessee Blue Raiders women's basketball

Lady Rebel Round-Up champions

WNIT, second round
- Conference: Conference USA
- Record: 23–11 (11–5 C-USA)
- Head coach: Rick Insell (14th season)
- Assistant coaches: Kim Brewton; Matt Insell; Shalon Pillow
- Home arena: Murphy Center

2018–19 Conference USA women's basketball standings
	Conf.				Overall
Team	W		L	PCT	W		L	PCT
No. 21 Rice †	16	–	0	1.000	28	–	4	.875
UAB	12	–	4	.750	26	–	7	.788
Middle Tennessee	11	–	5	.688	23	–	11	.676
Western Kentucky	11	–	5	.688	20	–	15	.571
Old Dominion	10	–	6	.625	21	–	11	.656
Marshall	10	–	6	.625	17	–	15	.531
Charlotte	9	–	7	.563	18	–	14	.563
Southern Miss	9	–	7	.563	18	–	14	.563
North Texas	7	–	9	.438	18	–	16	.529
Louisiana Tech	6	–	10	.375	14	–	16	.467
UTEP	5	–	11	.313	9	–	22	.290
UTSA	2	–	14	.125	7	–	21	.250
FIU	2	–	14	.125	5	–	24	.172
Florida Atlantic	2	–	14	.125	5	–	25	.167
† 2019 C-USA Tournament winner Rankings from AP poll

The 2018–19 Middle Tennessee Blue Raiders women's basketball team represented Middle Tennessee State University during the 2018–19 NCAA Division I women's basketball season. The Blue Raiders, led by 14th-year head coach Rick Insell, played their home games at the Murphy Center in Murfreesboro, Tennessee, and were fourth-year members of Conference USA (C-USA). They finished the season 23–11, 11–5 in C-USA play, to finish in a tie for third place. They advanced to the championship game of the C-USA women's tournament, where they lost to Rice. They received an at-large bid to the Women's National Invitation Tournament, where they defeated IUPUI in the first round before losing to Ohio in the second round.

== Roster ==
2018–19 Middle Tennessee Blue Raiders women's basketball team
Players
Coaches

Pos.	#	Name	Height	Year	Previous school	Hometown
F	0	Alex Johnson	6 ft 0 in (1.83 m)	RS Sr	Blackman HS	Murfreesboro, TN
G	1	A'Queen Hayes	5 ft 8 in (1.73 m)	RS Sr	Horn Lake HS; Eastern Kentucky	Horn Lake, MS
G	2	Taylor Sutton	5 ft 4 in (1.63 m)	Fr	Greater Atlanta Christian	Atlanta, GA
G	3	Kyla Allison	6 ft 0 in (1.83 m)	RS So	Wekiva HS	Orlando, FL
C	11	Jadona Davis	6 ft 5 in (1.96 m)	So	Wayne County HS	Buckatunna, MS
G	12	Jess Louro	5 ft 10 in (1.78 m)	Sr	St. Rose HS	Wall, NJ
F	13	Jordan Majors	6 ft 0 in (1.83 m)	RS Jr	Martin Luther King HS	Nashville, TN
G	14	Katie Collier	5 ft 9 in (1.75 m)	Sr	Webb School of Knoxville	Knoxville, TN
G	15	Anna Jones	6 ft 1 in (1.85 m)	So	Jackson HS	Jackson, TN
F	21	LaSonja Edwards	6 ft 1 in (1.85 m)	Sr	Fort Pierce Central HS; Gulf Coast State	Fort Pierce, FL
C	22	Ra'Shika White (redshirt)	6 ft 4 in (1.93 m)	Jr	Phillip O'Berry Academy; Elon	Charlotte, NC
G	23	Alexis Whittington	5 ft 11 in (1.8 m)	Fr	Riverdale HS	Murfreesboro, TN
G	24	Amanda Whittington	5 ft 10 in (1.78 m)	Fr	Riverdale HS	Murfreesboro, TN
F	34	Mykia Dowdell	5 ft 9 in (1.75 m)	Fr	Oak Ridge HS	Oak Ridge, TN
F	35	Charity Savage	5 ft 0 in (1.52 m)	Jr	Barlett HS	Memphis, TN

Head coach

- Rick Insell (Middle Tennessee)

Assistant coach(es)

- Kim Brewton (Liberty)
- Matt Insell (Middle Tennessee)
- Shalon Pillow (Tennessee)

Legend

- (C) Team captain
- (S) Suspended
- (I) Ineligible
- (W) Walk-on
- Injured
- Current redshirt

Roster
Last update: February 28, 2025

== Schedule ==
Date time, TV	Rank^{#}	Opponent^{#}	Result	Record	Site (attendance) city, state
Exhibition
October 28, 2018*; 2:00 p.m.		Lindsey Wilson	W 90–45		Murphy Center (2,754); Murfreesboro, TN
October 31, 2018*; 6:30 p.m.		Trevecca Nazarene	L 71–88		Murphy Center; Murfreesboro, TN
Non-conference regular season
November 9, 2018*; 6:30 p.m.		Vanderbilt	W 65–58	1–0	Murphy Center (7,842); Murfreesboro, TN
November 11, 2018*; 1:00 p.m., ESPN+		at Furman	W 78–71	2–0	Timmons Arena (509); Greenville, SC
November 16, 2018*; 6:00 p.m., ESPN+		at Tennessee Tech	L 64–68	2–1	Eblen Center (1,520); Cookeville, TN
November 19, 2018*; 6:30 p.m.		Belmont	L 38–45	2–2	Murphy Center (3,625); Murfreesboro, TN
November 21, 2018*; 5:00 p.m.		Mississippi Valley State	W 101–51	3–2	Murphy Center (2,811); Murfreesboro, TN
November 24, 2018*; 4:30 p.m.		vs. Dartmouth; Lady Rebel Round-Up semifinals	W 70–58	4–2	Cox Pavilion (750); Paradise, NV
November 25, 2018*; 4:30 p.m.		at UNLV; Lady Rebel Round-Up championship	W 66–62	5–2	Cox Pavilion (754); Paradise, NV
November 29, 2018*; 11:00 a.m.		Georgia State	W 66–62	6–2	Murphy Center (11,310); Murfreesboro, TN
December 4, 2018*; 6:00 p.m., ESPN+		at Troy	W 67–64	7–2	Trojan Arena (989); Troy, AL
December 15, 2018*; 12:00 p.m.		at No. 18 Kentucky	L 55–72	7–3	Memorial Coliseum (5,076); Lexington, KY
December 20, 2018*; 6:30 p.m.		UNC Asheville	W 67–46	8–3	Murphy Center (2,012); Murfreesboro, TN
December 29, 2018*; 12:00 p.m.		vs. Chattanooga; Fordham Holiday Classic semifinals	W 58–47	9–3	Rose Hill Gymnasium (1,069); The Bronx, NY
December 30, 2018*; 2:00 p.m., ESPN+		at Fordham; Fordham Holiday Classic championship	L 49–61	9–4	Rose Hill Gymnasium; Bronx, NY
Conference USA regular season
January 3, 2019; 6:00 p.m.		at FIU	W 49–43	10–4 (1–0)	Ocean Bank Convocation Center; Miami, FL
January 5, 2019; 1:00 p.m., ESPN+		at Florida Atlantic	W 74–55	11–4 (2–0)	FIU Arena (364); Boca Raton, FL
January 10, 2019; 6:30 p.m.		Southern Miss	W 66–49	12–4 (3–0)	Murphy Center (3,987); Murfreesboro, TN
January 12, 2019; 6:00 p.m., ESPN+		Louisiana Tech	W 75–38	13–4 (4–0)	Murphy Center (4,127); Murfreesboro, TN
January 17, 2019; 7:00 p.m.		at UTSA	W 72–52	14–4 (5–0)	Convocation Center (550); San Antonio, TX
January 17, 2019; 2:00 p.m.		at UTEP	W 79–49	15–4 (6–0)	Don Haskins Center (485); El Paso, TX
January 24, 2019; 6:30 p.m., ESPN+		Rice	L 47–60	15–5 (6–1)	Murphy Center (4,053); Murfreesboro, TN
January 26, 2019; 5:00 p.m.		North Texas	W 61–46	16–5 (7–1)	Murphy Center (3,833); Murfreesboro, TN
February 2, 2019; 6:00 p.m.		UAB	W 60–44	17–5 (8–1)	Murphy Center (3,933); Murfreesboro, TN
February 7, 2019; 6:00 p.m., ESPN+		at Charlotte	W 62–55	18–5 (9–1)	Dale F. Halton Arena (918); Charlotte, NC
February 9, 2019; 1:00 p.m.		at Old Dominion	L 65–70	18–6 (9–2)	Ted Constant Convocation Center (2,400); Norfolk, VA
February 14, 2019; 6:30 p.m.		Western Kentucky	W 81–69	19–6 (10–2)	Murphy Center (3,922); Murfreesboro, TN
February 16, 2019; 5:00 p.m.		Marshall	L 53–59	19–7 (10–3)	Murphy Center (3,952); Murfreesboro, TN
February 23, 2019; 2:00 p.m.		at UAB	L 72–77 ^{OT}	19–8 (10–4)	Bartow Arena (487); Birmingham, AL
March 2, 2019; 5:00 p.m.		Florida Atlantic	W 74–48	20–8 (11–4)	Murphy Center (4,044); Murfreesboro, TN
March 7, 2019; 6:00 p.m., ESPN+		at Western Kentucky	L 56–67	20–9 (11–5)	E. A. Diddle Arena (1,823); Bowling Green, KY
Conference USA women's tournament
March 14, 2019; 2:00 p.m., Stadium	(3)	vs. (11) UTEP; Quarterfinals	W 66–44	21–9	The Ford Center at The Star; Frisco, TX
March 15, 2019; 8:00 p.m., Stadium	(3)	vs. (2) UAB; Semifinals	W 75–65	22–9	The Ford Center at The Star (2,592); Frisco, TX
March 16, 2019; 4:30 p.m., CBSSN	(3)	vs. (1) No. 24 Rice; Championship game	L 54–69	22–10	The Ford Center at The Star; Frisco, TX
WNIT
March 21, 2019*; 6:30 p.m.		IUPUI; First round	W 59–47	23–10	Murphy Center (1,492); Murfreesboro, TN
March 24, 2019*; 1:00 p.m.		at Ohio; Second round	L 57–59	23–11	Convocation Center (867); Athens, OH
*Non-conference game. ^{#}Rankings from AP poll. (#) Tournament seedings in parentheses. All times are in Central.

== See also ==
- 2018–19 Middle Tennessee Blue Raiders men's basketball team
