= 2018–19 UTSA Roadrunners women's basketball team =

Intercollegiate basketball season

2018–19 UTSA Roadrunners women's basketball
- Conference: Conference USA
- Record: 7–21 (2–14 C-USA)
- Head coach: Kristen Holt (2nd season)
- Assistant coaches: Adam Esses; Ela Mukosiej; Stephanie Lee
- Home arena: Convocation Center

2018–19 Conference USA women's basketball standings
	Conf.				Overall
Team	W		L	PCT	W		L	PCT
No. 21 Rice †	16	–	0	1.000	28	–	4	.875
UAB	12	–	4	.750	26	–	7	.788
Middle Tennessee	11	–	5	.688	23	–	11	.676
Western Kentucky	11	–	5	.688	20	–	15	.571
Old Dominion	10	–	6	.625	21	–	11	.656
Marshall	10	–	6	.625	17	–	15	.531
Charlotte	9	–	7	.563	18	–	14	.563
Southern Miss	9	–	7	.563	18	–	14	.563
North Texas	7	–	9	.438	18	–	16	.529
Louisiana Tech	6	–	10	.375	14	–	16	.467
UTEP	5	–	11	.313	9	–	22	.290
UTSA	2	–	14	.125	7	–	21	.250
FIU	2	–	14	.125	5	–	24	.172
Florida Atlantic	2	–	14	.125	5	–	25	.167
† 2019 C-USA Tournament winner Rankings from AP poll

The 2018–19 UTSA Roadrunners women's basketball team represented the University of Texas at San Antonio during the 2018–19 NCAA Division I women's basketball season. The Roadrunners, led by second-year head coach Kristen Holt, played their home games at the Convocation Center in San Antonio, Texas and were members of Conference USA (C-USA). They finished the season 7–21, 2–14 in C-USA play, to finish in a three-way tie for twelfth place. Due to a tiebreaker loss to Florida Atlantic and FIU, they failed to qualify for the C-USA women's tournament.

== Roster ==
2018–19 UTSA Roadrunners women's basketball team
Players
Coaches

Pos.	#	Name	Height	Year	Previous school	Hometown
G	0	Charlotte Ellmore	5 ft 8 in (1.73 m)	Fr	Barking Abbey School	Essex, England
F	1	Evelyn Omemmah	6 ft 1 in (1.85 m)	RS Jr	Long Island Lutheran HS; Paris JC	Kakuri, Nigeria
G	10	Tasharian Robinson	5 ft 10 in (1.78 m)	So	Clear Springs HS	League City, TX
G	11	Ryann Stearns	5 ft 9 in (1.75 m)	Fr	Andover Central HS	Andover, KS
G	13	Deja Cousin	5 ft 9 in (1.75 m)	Jr	The Burlington School	Burlington, NC
F	15	Timea Toth	6 ft 1 in (1.85 m)	Jr	Dunakeszi Radnóti Miklos Gimnáziuma	Dunakeszi, Hungary
F	20	Kourtney Kekec	5 ft 10 in (1.78 m)	Sr	North County HS; Mineral Area JC	Bonne Terre, MO
F	21	Marie Benson	6 ft 1 in (1.85 m)	Jr	Midland HS	Waco, TX
F	23	Tija Hawkins	6 ft 1 in (1.85 m)	Jr	Shoemaker HS	Killeen, TX
G	33	Barbara Benson	5 ft 11 in (1.8 m)	So	Midway HS	Amarillo, TX
G	34	Karrington Donald	5 ft 7 in (1.7 m)	So	Humble HS	Humble, TX
F	40	Mandi Cooks	6 ft 1 in (1.85 m)	Fr	McPherson HS	McPherson, KS

Head coach

- Kristen Holt (Ohio)

Assistant coach(es)

- Adam Esses (Bethany (KS))
- Ela Mukosiej (Seton Hall)
- Stephanie Lee (Northern Colorado)

Legend

- (C) Team captain
- (S) Suspended
- (I) Ineligible
- (W) Walk-on
- Injured
- Current redshirt

Roster

== Schedule ==
Date time, TV	Rank^{#}	Opponent^{#}	Result	Record	Site (attendance) city, state
Exhibition
November 2, 2018*; 7:00 p.m.		Sul Ross State	W 84–41		Convocation Center; San Antonio, TX
Non-conference regular season
November 6, 2018*; 7:00 p.m.		Concordia (TX)	W 78–51	1–0	Convocation Center (360); San Antonio, TX
November 10, 2018*; 1:00 p.m.		vs. UMBC; Seton Hall Tip-Off	L 58–72	1–1	Walsh Gymnasium (214); South Orange, NJ
November 11, 2018*; 12:00 p.m.		at Seton Hall; Seton Hall Tip-Off	L 53–84	1–2	Walsh Gymnasium (487); South Orange, NJ
November 14, 2018*; 7:00 p.m.		Texas–Rio Grande Valley	W 61–58	2–2	Convocation Center (353); San Antonio, TX
November 20, 2018*; 7:00 p.m.		Texas State; I-35 Rivalry	L 60–68	2–3	Convocation Center (538); San Antonio, TX
November 23, 2018*; 4:00 p.m.		IUPUI; UTSA Thanksgiving Classic	L 50–58	2–4	Convocation Center (276); San Antonio, TX
November 24, 2018*; 2:00 p.m.		Weber State; UTSA Thanksgiving Classic	W 66–59	3–4	Convocation Center (333); San Antonio, TX
November 28, 2018*; 11:00 a.m., LHN		at No. 10 Texas	L 54–98	3–5	Frank Erwin Center (9,495); Austin, TX
December 5, 2018*; 7:00 p.m.		Utah State	L 56–62	3–6	Convocation Center (344); San Antonio, TX
December 15, 2018*; 2:00 p.m.		San Diego	W 87–77	4–6	Convocation Center (451); San Antonio, TX
December 20, 2018*; 2:00 p.m., ESPN+		at UT Arlington	L 48–53	4–7	College Park Center (694); Arlington, TX
December 30, 2018*; 2:00 p.m.		Texas A&M–Kingsville	W 86–55	5–7	Convocation Center (441); San Antonio, TX
Conference USA regular season
January 5, 2019; 2:00 p.m., ESPN+		UTEP	L 60–73	5–8 (0–1)	Convocation Center (450); San Antonio, TX
January 10, 2019; 7:00 p.m.		at Rice	L 54–85	5–9 (0–2)	Tudor Fieldhouse (679); Houston, TX
January 12, 2019; 3:00 p.m.		at North Texas	W 57–54	6–9 (1–2)	The Super Pit (802); Denton, TX
January 17, 2019; 7:00 p.m.		Middle Tennessee	L 52–72	6–10 (1–3)	Convocation Center (550); San Antonio, TX
January 19, 2019; 1:00 p.m.		UAB	L 42–59	6–11 (1–4)	Convocation Center (460); San Antonio, TX
January 24, 2019; 6:00 p.m., beIN		at Charlotte	L 54–66	6–12 (1–5)	Dale F. Halton Arena (905); Charlotte, NC
January 26, 2019; 6:00 p.m.		at Old Dominion	L 47–72	6–13 (1–6)	Ted Constant Convocation Center (1,928); Norfolk, VA
January 31, 2019; 11:00 a.m.		Western Kentucky	L 62–81	6–14 (1–7)	Convocation Center (1,200); San Antonio, TX
February 2, 2019; 2:00 p.m.		Marshall	L 72–79 ^{OT}	6–15 (1–8)	Convocation Center (480); San Antonio, TX
February 7, 2019; 10:00 a.m.		at FIU	L 40–51	6–16 (1–9)	Ocean Bank Convocation Center (643); Miami, FL
February 9, 2019; 1:00 p.m.		at Florida Atlantic	L 70–86	6–17 (1–10)	FAU Arena (356); Boca Raton, FL
February 14, 2019; 7:00 p.m.		Southern Miss	L 45–70	6–18 (1–11)	Convocation Center (430); San Antonio, TX
February 16, 2019; 2:00 p.m.		Louisiana Tech	W 70–68	7–18 (2–11)	Convocation Center (705); San Antonio, TX
February 23, 2019; 2:00 p.m., ESPN+		at UTEP	L 73–77	7–19 (2–12)	Don Haskins Center (832); El Paso, TX
March 2, 2019; 4:00 p.m.		at Southern Miss	L 39–72	7–20 (2–13)	Reed Green Coliseum (1,171); Hattiesburg, MS
March 7, 2019; 7:00 p.m., ESPN+		No. 24 Rice	L 46–72	7–21 (2–14)	Convocation Center (579); San Antonio, TX
*Non-conference game. ^{#}Rankings from AP Poll. (#) Tournament seedings in parentheses. All times are in Central.

== See also ==
- 2018–19 UTSA Roadrunners men's basketball team
