= 2019 Conference USA women's basketball tournament =

- Classification: Division I
- Season: 2018–19
- Teams: 12
- Site: The Ford Center at The Star; Frisco, Texas
- Champions: Rice (1st title)
- Winning coach: Tina Langley (1st title)
- MVP: Nancy Mulkey (Rice)
- Television: ESPN+, Stadium, CBSSN

2018–19 Conference USA women's basketball standings
	Conf.				Overall
Team	W		L	PCT	W		L	PCT
No. 21 Rice †	16	–	0	1.000	28	–	4	.875
UAB	12	–	4	.750	26	–	7	.788
Middle Tennessee	11	–	5	.688	23	–	11	.676
Western Kentucky	11	–	5	.688	20	–	15	.571
Old Dominion	10	–	6	.625	21	–	11	.656
Marshall	10	–	6	.625	17	–	15	.531
Charlotte	9	–	7	.563	18	–	14	.563
Southern Miss	9	–	7	.563	18	–	14	.563
North Texas	7	–	9	.438	18	–	16	.529
Louisiana Tech	6	–	10	.375	14	–	16	.467
UTEP	5	–	11	.313	9	–	22	.290
UTSA	2	–	14	.125	7	–	21	.250
FIU	2	–	14	.125	5	–	24	.172
Florida Atlantic	2	–	14	.125	5	–	25	.167
† 2019 C-USA Tournament winner Rankings from AP poll

The 2019 Conference USA women's basketball tournament was a postseason women's basketball tournament for Conference USA that was held at The Ford Center at The Star in Frisco, Texas, from March 13 through March 16, 2019. In the first round and quarterfinals, two games were played simultaneously within the same arena, with the courts separated by a curtain. Rice won the conference tournament championship game over Middle Tennessee, 69–54. Nancy Mulkey was named the tournament's Most Valuable Player.

== Seeds ==
The top twelve teams will qualify for the tournament. Teams will be seeded by record within the conference, with a tiebreaker system to seed teams with identical conference records.

Seed	School	Conference record	Overall record	Tiebreaker
1	Rice	16–0	25–3	
2	UAB	12–4	24–5	
3	Middle Tennessee	11–5	20–9	1–0 vs. UAB
4	Western Kentucky	11–5	17–13	0–1 vs. UAB
5	Old Dominion	10–6	20–9	1–0 vs. USM
6	Marshall	10–6	16–13	0–1 vs. USM
7	Charlotte	9–7	17–11	1–0 vs. WKU
8	Southern Miss	9–7	17–12	0–1 vs. WKU
9	North Texas	7–9	14–14	
10	Louisiana Tech	6–10	14–15	
11	UTEP	5–11	8–21	
12	Florida Atlantic	2–14	6–23	2–1 vs. FIU, UTSA
	FIU	2–14	5–24	1–2 vs. FAU, UTSA
	UTSA	2–14	7–21	0–2 vs. FIU, FAU
‡ – C–USA regular season champions, and tournament No. 1 seed. # – Received a single-bye in the conference tournament. Overall records include all games played in the regular season.

== Schedule ==
Session	Game	Time*	Matchup^{#}	Television	Attendance
First round – Wednesday, March 13
1	1	11:00 am	#8 Southern Miss vs #9 North Texas	ESPN+	
1	2	11:30 am	#5 Old Dominion vs #12 Florida Atlantic	ESPN+	
2	3	1:30 pm	#7 Charlotte vs #10 Louisiana Tech	ESPN+	1,921
2	4	2:00 pm	#6 Marshall vs #11 UTEP	ESPN+	1,921
Quarterfinals – Thursday, March 14
3	5	11:00 am	#1 Rice vs #9 North Texas	Stadium	
3	6	11:30 am	#4 Western Kentucky vs #5 Old Dominion	ESPN+	
4	7	1:30 pm	#2 UAB vs #7 Charlotte	Stadium	
4	8	2:00 pm	#3 Middle Tennessee vs #11 UTEP	ESPN+	
Semifinals – Friday, March 15
5	9	5:30 pm	#1 Rice vs #4 Western Kentucky	Stadium	2,592
5	10	8:00 pm	#2 UAB vs #3 Middle Tennessee	Stadium	2,592
Championship – Saturday, March 16
6	11	4:30 pm	#1 Rice vs #3 Middle Tennessee	CBSSN	
*Game times in CT. #-Rankings denote tournament seed

== Bracket ==
First round Wednesday, March 13; ESPN+
8	Southern Miss	46
9	North Texas	49
5	Old Dominion	60
12	Florida Atlantic	32
7	Charlotte	55
10	Louisiana Tech	46
6	Marshall	56
11	UTEP	64^{2OT}

Quarterfinals; Thursday, March 14; ESPN+/Stadium
1	Rice	61
9	North Texas	43
4	Western Kentucky	74
5	Old Dominion	60
2	UAB	70
7	Charlotte	55
3	Middle Tennessee	66
11	UTEP	44

Semifinals; Friday, March 15; Stadium
1	Rice	64
4	Western Kentucky	57
2	UAB	65
3	Middle Tennessee	75

Championship Game; Saturday, March 16; CBSSN
1	Rice	69
3	Middle Tennessee	54

All times listed are Central

== See also ==
- 2019 Conference USA men's basketball tournament
