= 2018–19 Marshall Thundering Herd women's basketball team =

Intercollegiate basketball season

2018–19 Marshall Thundering Herd women's basketball

WBI, Quarterfinals
- Conference: Conference USA
- Record: 17–15 (10–6 C-USA)
- Head coach: Tony Kemper (2nd season)
- Assistant coaches: Adria Crawford; Lazar Milinkovic; Stephanie Stoglin-Reed
- Home arena: Cam Henderson Center

2018–19 Conference USA women's basketball standings
	Conf.				Overall
Team	W		L	PCT	W		L	PCT
No. 21 Rice †	16	–	0	1.000	28	–	4	.875
UAB	12	–	4	.750	26	–	7	.788
Middle Tennessee	11	–	5	.688	23	–	11	.676
Western Kentucky	11	–	5	.688	20	–	15	.571
Old Dominion	10	–	6	.625	21	–	11	.656
Marshall	10	–	6	.625	17	–	15	.531
Charlotte	9	–	7	.563	18	–	14	.563
Southern Miss	9	–	7	.563	18	–	14	.563
North Texas	7	–	9	.438	18	–	16	.529
Louisiana Tech	6	–	10	.375	14	–	16	.467
UTEP	5	–	11	.313	9	–	22	.290
UTSA	2	–	14	.125	7	–	21	.250
FIU	2	–	14	.125	5	–	24	.172
Florida Atlantic	2	–	14	.125	5	–	25	.167
† 2019 C-USA Tournament winner Rankings from AP poll

The 2018–19 Marshall Thundering Herd women's basketball team represented the Marshall University during the 2018–19 NCAA Division I women's basketball season. The Thundering Herd, led by second year head coach Tony Kemper, played their home games at the Cam Henderson Center and were members of Conference USA. They finished the season 17–15, 10–6 in C-USA play to finish in a tie for fifth place. They lost in the first round of the C-USA women's tournament to UTEP. They received an invitation to the WBI where they defeated Davidson in the first round before losing to Appalachian State in the quarterfinals.

== Roster ==
2018–19 Marshall Thundering Herd women's basketball team
Players
Coaches

Pos.	#	Name	Height	Year	Previous school	Hometown
G	0	Kia Sivils	5 ft 7 in (1.7 m)	Fr	Sacred Heart Academy	Louisville, KY
F	1	Jovana Vucetic	6 ft 1 in (1.85 m)	Jr	Sunrise Christian Academy	Loznica, Serbia
G	2	Logan Fraley	5 ft 10 in (1.78 m)	Sr	Boyd County HS	Ashland, KY
G/F	5	Princess Clemons	5 ft 11 in (1.8 m)	Jr	San Jacinto	Chester, PA
G	10	Ashley Saintigene	6 ft 2 in (1.88 m)	Jr	Northeast HS	Lauderdale Lakes, FL
G	11	Taylor Porter	5 ft 8 in (1.73 m)	RS Sr	Murray State	Fort Gay, WV
G/F	14	Shayna Gore	5 ft 8 in (1.73 m)	Sr	Logan HS	Logan, WV
G	15	Tana Driver	5 ft 0 in (1.52 m)	RS Jr	MacArthur HS	Irving, TX
F	20	Taylor Pearson	5 ft 7 in (1.7 m)	So	Columbus Alternative HS	Columbus, OH
F	21	Brianna Toney	5 ft 11 in (1.8 m)	So	Bexley HS	Bexley, OH
G/F	22	Khadaijia Brooks	5 ft 10 in (1.78 m)	RS Jr	Bristol Eastern HS	Bristol, CT
G	23	Kristen Mayo	5 ft 5 in (1.65 m)	So	East Carter	Grayson, KY
G/F	33	Aeriel Adkins	5 ft 10 in (1.78 m)	Fr	Wayne HS	Wayne, WV
F/C	34	Lorelei Roper	6 ft 1 in (1.85 m)	Fr	Carmel Christian HS	Charlotte, NC

Head coach

- Tony Kemper (Fort Hays State)

Assistant coach(es)

- Adria Crawford (Georgetown)
- Lazar Milinkovic (Ohio)
- Stephanie Stoglin-Reed (Houston Baptist)

Legend

- (C) Team captain
- (S) Suspended
- (I) Ineligible
- (W) Walk-on
- Injured
- Current redshirt

Roster

== Schedule ==
Date time, TV	Rank^{#}	Opponent^{#}	Result	Record	Site (attendance) city, state
Non-conference regular season
Nov 7, 2018*; 6:00 pm		Indiana State	L 53–62	0–1	Cam Henderson Center (764); Huntington, WV
Nov 13, 2018*; 6:00 pm, ESPN+		at Bowling Green	L 76–99	0–2	Stroh Center (1,521); Bowling Green, OH
Nov 17, 2018*; 3:00 pm, ESPN3		at Southern Illinois	L 49–58	0–3	SIU Arena (500); Carbondale, IL
Nov 20, 2018*; 1:00 pm		Bluefield State	W 82–29	1–3	Cam Henderson Center (894); Huntington, WV
Nov 25, 2018*; 2:00 pm		at Appalachian State	L 52–74	1–4	Holmes Center (279); Boone, NC
Nov 29, 2018*; 6:00 pm		Evansville	W 72–65 ^{OT}	2–4	Cam Henderson Center (638); Huntington, WV
Dec 1, 2018*; 1:00 pm		Coppin State	W 88–67	3–4	Cam Henderson Center (694); Huntington, WV
Dec 4, 2018*; 8:00 pm		at Wisconsin	L 49–67	3–5	Kohl Center (2,837); Madison, WI
Dec 8, 2018*; 5:00 pm		Cleveland State	W 86–64	4–5	Cam Henderson Center (6,232); Huntington, WV
Dec 15, 2018*; 2:00 pm		Tennessee State	W 80–59	5–5	Cam Henderson Center (878); Huntington, WV
Dec 18, 2018*; 12:00 pm		at Clemson	L 54–68	5–6	Littlejohn Coliseum (3,627); Clemson, SC
Dec 22, 2018*; 1:00 pm		Towson	L 69–76	5–7	Cam Henderson Center (848); Huntington, WV
Dec 29, 2018*; 1:00 pm		Delaware State	W 75–63	6–7	Cam Henderson Center (619); Huntington, WV
Conference USA regular season
Jan 3, 2019; 6:00 pm		Old Dominion	W 57–48	7–7 (1–0)	Cam Henderson Center (698); Huntington, WV
Jan 5, 2019; 1:00 pm, ESPN+		Charlotte	W 63–62	8–7 (2–0)	Cam Henderson Center (738); Huntington, WV
Jan 12, 2019; 3:00 pm		at Western Kentucky	L 55–85	8–8 (2–1)	E. A. Diddle Arena (1,391); Bowling Green, KY
Jan 17, 2019; 7:00 pm		at Florida Atlantic	W 72–67	9–8 (3–1)	FAU Arena (388); Boca Raton, FL
Jan 19, 2019; 2:00 pm		at FIU	W 86–58	10–8 (4–1)	Ocean Bank Convocation Center (248); Miami, FL
Jan 24, 2019; 6:00 pm		Louisiana Tech	W 90–88 ^{3OT}	11–8 (5–1)	Cam Henderson Center (711); Huntington, WV
Jan 26, 2019; 1:00 pm		Southern Miss	L 52–64	11–9 (5–2)	Cam Henderson Center (774); Huntington, WV
Jan 31, 2019; 9:00 pm		at UTEP	W 64–52	12–9 (6–2)	Don Haskins Center (774); El Paso, TX
Feb 2, 2019; 3:00 pm		at UTSA	W 79–72 ^{OT}	13–9 (7–2)	Convocation Center (480); San Antonio, TX
Feb 7, 2019; 6:00 pm, beIN		North Texas	W 67–55	14–9 (8–2)	Cam Henderson Center (660); Huntington, WV
Feb 9, 2019; 12:00 pm		Rice	L 67–79	14–10 (8–3)	Cam Henderson Center (1,042); Huntington, WV
Feb 14, 2019; 7:00 pm		at UAB	L 59–77	14–11 (8–4)	Bartow Arena (401); Birmingham, AL
Feb 16, 2019; 6:00 pm		at Middle Tennessee	W 59–53	15–11 (9–4)	Murphy Center (3,952); Murfreesboro, TN
Feb 23, 2019; 1:00 pm, ESPN+		Western Kentucky	L 66–69 ^{OT}	15–12 (9–5)	Cam Henderson Center (1,182); Huntington, WV
Mar 2, 2019; 4:00 pm		at Old Dominion	L 53–79	15–13 (9–6)	Ted Constant Convocation Center (2,408); Norfolk, VA
Mar 7, 2019; 6:00 pm		FIU	W 87–42	16–13 (10–6)	Cam Henderson Center (1,082); Huntington, WV
Conference USA Women's Tournament
Mar 13, 2019; 3:00 pm, ESPN+	(6)	vs. (11) UTEP; First Round	L 56–64 ^{2OT}	16–14	The Ford Center at The Star (1,921); Frisco, TX
WBI
Mar 20, 2019*; 7:00 pm, ESPN+		at Davidson; First Round	W 67–64	17–14	John M. Belk Arena (324); Davidson, NC
Mar 25, 2019*; 6:30 pm, ESPN+		at Appalachian State; Quarterfinals	L 71–83	17–15	Holmes Center (937); Boone, NC
*Non-conference game. ^{#}Rankings from AP Poll. (#) Tournament seedings in parentheses. All times are in Eastern Time.

== See also ==
2018–19 Marshall Thundering Herd men's basketball team
