= Keith Freeman =

American basketball coach (born 1963)

Current position
- Title: Associate head coach
- Team: New Mexico
- Conference: Mountain West
- Record: 276–226

Biographical details
- Born: December 11, 1963 (age 62)
- Education: Huntington; Ball State

Coaching career (HC unless noted)
- 1983–1985: Huntington
- 1985–1989: Huntington (men's)
- 1990–1994: Saint Joseph's (IN)
- 1994–2012: Valparaiso
- 2012–2018: Wright State (assistant)
- 2018–2020: Old Dominion (associate HC)
- 2020–2021: Mississippi State (associate HC)
- 2021–present: New Mexico (associate HC)

Administrative career (AD unless noted)
- 1991–1993: Saint Joseph's (IN) (assistant)
- 1993–1994: Saint Joseph's (IN)

Head coaching record
- Overall: 435–347 (women's basketball); 30–74 (men's basketball)
- Tournaments: 0–2 (NCAA Division I); 2–1 (WNIT)

Accomplishments and honors

Awards
- GLVC Coach of the Year (1992); MCC/Summit Coach of the Year (1996, 1998, 2002)

Keith Freeman (born December 11, 1963) is the associate head coach of the women's basketball team at University of New Mexico. He is the former women's basketball program head coach at Valparaiso University. Freeman, the sixth head coach in the history of the Valparaiso University Crusader women's basketball program, was hired as the head coach before the 1994–95 season. Freeman also served as the head women's basketball coach at Saint Joseph's College in Rensselaer, Indiana, from 1990 to 1994, and was the Great Lakes Valley Coach of the Year in 1992. Prior his tenure at Saint Joseph's, Freeman was the head men's basketball coach at Huntington (Ind.) College from 1985 to 1989. Freeman took over the Huntington program at age 21, making him one of the youngest college coaches in the nation. Freeman began coaching at the age of 19 when he was named the head women's basketball coach at Huntington, serving from 1983 to 1985.

Freeman graduated cum laude from Huntington College in May 1986, earning a Bachelor of Science degree in business administration. He also completed his Master of Business Administration at Ball State University in August 1987.

== Head coaching record ==
=== Women's basketball ===
Record table
Season	Team	Overall	Conference	Standing	Postseason
Huntington Foresters (1983–1985)
1983–84	Huntington	20–10			
1984–85	Huntington	24–9			
Huntington:		44–19 (.698)			
St. Joseph's Pumas (Great Lakes Valley) (1990–1994)
1990–91	St. Joseph's	21–7	12–6	T–3rd	
1991–92	St. Joseph's	28–3	16–2	1st	NCAA Div. II Elite Eight
1992–93	St. Joseph's	20–7	13–5	3rd	
1993–94	St. Joseph's	16–11	10–8	T–5th	
St. Joseph's:		85–28 (.752)	51–21 (.708)		
Valparaiso Crusaders (Mid-Continent/Summit) (1994–2007)
1994–95	Valparaiso	16–11	12–6	4th	
1995–96	Valparaiso	17–10	12–6	T–3rd	
1996–97	Valparaiso	14–12	8–7	5th	
1997–98	Valparaiso	22–7	14–2	2nd	
1998–99	Valparaiso	18–11	10–4	T–1st	
1999–00	Valparaiso	18–12	10–6	4th	
2000–01	Valparaiso	7–22	4–12	8th	
2001–02	Valparaiso	26–7	13–1	1st	WNIT Quarterfinals
2002–03	Valparaiso	18–13	8–6	T–2nd	NCAA
2003–04	Valparaiso	20–12	11–5	T–2nd	NCAA
2004–05	Valparaiso	18–10	12–4	T–2nd	
2005–06	Valparaiso	16–13	9–7	4th	
2006–07	Valparaiso	20–11	11–3	2nd	
Mid-Continent/Summit:			143–69 (.675)		
Valparaiso Crusaders (Horizon) (2007–present)
2007–08	Valparaiso	14–16	9–9	6th	
2008–09	Valparaiso	16–14	10–8	T–4th	
2009–10	Valparaiso	9–21	6–12	T–7th	
2010–11	Valparaiso	7–24	4–14	T-9th	
2011–12	Valparaiso	10–21	5–13	T-8th	
Horizon League:			34–56 (.378)		
Valparaiso Crusaders:		286–247 (.537)	177–125 (.586)		
Total:		415–294 (.585)			
National champion Postseason invitational champion Conference regular season champion Conference regular season and conference tournament champion Division regular season champion Division regular season and conference tournament champion Conference tournament champion

=== Men's basketball ===
Record table
Season	Team	Overall	Conference	Standing	Postseason
Huntington Foresters (1985–1989)
Huntington:		30–74 (.289)			
Total:		30–74 (.289)			
National champion Postseason invitational champion Conference regular season champion Conference regular season and conference tournament champion Division regular season champion Division regular season and conference tournament champion Conference tournament champion
