= 2018–19 Liberty Lady Flames basketball team =

Intercollegiate basketball season

2018–19 Liberty Lady Flames basketball
- Conference: Atlantic Sun Conference
- Record: 16–16 (10–6 A-Sun)
- Head coach: Carey Green (20th season)
- Assistant coaches: Alexis Sherard; Andy Bloodworth; Monica Wright
- Home arena: Vines Center

2018–19 ASUN women's basketball standings
	Conf.				Overall
Team	W		L	PCT	W		L	PCT
Florida Gulf Coast †	16	–	0	1.000	28	–	5	.848
Stetson	11	–	5	.688	16	–	16	.500
North Alabama	10	–	6	.625	21	–	9	.700
Liberty	10	–	6	.625	16	–	16	.500
North Florida	9	–	7	.563	15	–	14	.517
Jacksonville	7	–	9	.438	14	–	16	.467
Kennesaw State	4	–	12	.250	9	–	22	.290
NJIT	3	–	13	.188	6	–	24	.200
Lipscomb	2	–	14	.125	4	–	25	.138
† 2019 ASUN Tournament winner Rankings from AP poll

The 2018–19 Liberty Lady Flames basketball team represented Liberty University during the 2018–19 NCAA Division I women's basketball season. The Eagles, led by twentieth-year head coach Carey Green, played their home games at the Vines Center and were first year members of the Atlantic Sun Conference. They finished the season 16–16, 10–6 in A-Sun play to finish in a tie for third place. They advanced to the championship game of the A-Sun Tournament, where they lost to Florida Gulf Coast.

== Roster ==
2018–19 Liberty Lady Flames women's basketball team
Players
Coaches

Pos.	#	Name	Height	Year	Previous school	Hometown
G	2	Ria Gulley	5 ft 9 in (1.75 m)	RS So	Tom C. Clark; Indiana	San Antonio, TX
G	3	Jordan Peters	5 ft 7 in (1.7 m)	Fr	Statesville Christian School	Statesville, NC
G	4	Tatyana Crowder	5 ft 6 in (1.68 m)	Sr	Liberty Christian Academy	Roanoke, VA
G	5	Melat Sissay	5 ft 6 in (1.68 m)	Fr	Solna Gymnasium	Stockholm, Sweden
G/F	10	Kierra Johnson-Graham	5 ft 11 in (1.8 m)	Jr	Tucker	Atlanta, GA
G	11	Brooke Basinger	5 ft 8 in (1.73 m)	Sr	Woodgrove; Christopher Newport	Purcellville, VA
G	12	Ashtyn Baker	5 ft 6 in (1.68 m)	So	Northpoint Christian School	Nesbit, MS
G	13	Melis Ucar	5 ft 10 in (1.78 m)	Sr	Bahcelievler Deneme; Iowa Western CC	Ankara, Turkey
F/C	20	Mya McMillian	6 ft 3 in (1.91 m)	Fr	Marble Falls	Marble Falls, TX
F/C	21	Keyen Green	6 ft 1 in (1.85 m)	Jr	Phil-Mont Christian Academy	Philadelphia, PA
G	23	Emily Lytle	5 ft 11 in (1.8 m)	RS So	Evangelical Christian; Little Rock	Memphis, TN
F	30	KK Barbour	6 ft 1 in (1.85 m)	Sr	Albemarle	Charlottesville, VA
F/C	32	Lizzie Moore	6 ft 2 in (1.88 m)	Fr	Valley Christian	San Jose, CA
F/C	33	Amy West	6 ft 4 in (1.93 m)	RS Fr	Palmerston North Girls	Palmerston North, New Zealand
F	34	Bridgette Rettstatt	6 ft 2 in (1.88 m)	So	Worthington Christian	Galena, OH

Head coach

- Carey Green (Coastal Carolina)

Assistant coach(es)

- Alexis Sherard (Saint Michael's)
- Andy Bloodworth (Calvin)
- Monica Wright (Virginia)

Legend

- (C) Team captain
- (S) Suspended
- (I) Ineligible
- (W) Walk-on
- Injured
- Current redshirt

Roster

== Schedule ==
Date time, TV	Rank^{#}	Opponent^{#}	Result	Record	Site (attendance) city, state
Non-conference regular season
Nov 9, 2018*; 7:00 pm		at Bethune–Cookman	L 76–81 ^{OT}	0–1	Moore Gymnasium (317); Daytona Beach, FL
Nov 13, 2018*; 6:00 pm, ESPN+		Virginia Tech	L 61–72	0–2	Vines Center (1,573); Lynchburg, VA
Nov 17, 2018*; 2:00 pm, ESPN+		Saint Francis (PA)	W 82–53	1–2	Vines Center (1,090); Lynchburg, VA
Nov 21, 2018*; 7:00 pm, ESPN+		at Chattanooga	L 60–75	1–3	McKenzie Arena (1,255); Chattanooga, TN
Nov 24, 2018*; 4:30 pm		vs. Charlotte; Christmas City Classic semifinals	L 61–63	1–4	Stabler Arena (536); Bethlehem, PA
Nov 24, 2018*; 4:30 pm		vs. Norfolk State; Christmas City Classic 3rd place game	L 53–66	1–5	Stabler Arena (489); Bethlehem, PA
Nov 29, 2018*; 7:00 pm, ESPN+		James Madison	L 53–74	1–6	Vines Center (1,217); Lynchburg, VA
Dec 4, 2018*; 7:00 pm, ESPN+		at East Tennessee State	W 89–86	2–6	J. Madison Brooks Gymnasium (904); Johnson City, TN
Dec 13, 2018*; 11:30 am		at East Carolina	L 63–66	2–7	Williams Arena (6,276); Greenville, NC
Dec 16, 2018*; 2:00 pm, ESPN+		at UNC Greenboro	L 45–48	2–8	Fleming Gymnasium (195); Greensboro, NC
Dec 21, 2018*; 5:00 pm		vs. UCF; St. Pete Shootout	L 45–53	2–9	McArthur Center (212); St. Petersburg, FL
Dec 22, 2018*; 5:00 pm		vs. Duquesne; St. Pete Shootout	W 55–51	3–9	McArthur Center (209); St. Petersburg, FL
Jan 2, 2018*; 5:00 pm		West Chester	W 61–42	4–9	Vines Center (1,095); Lynchburg, VA
Atlantic Sun regular season
Jan 5, 2019; 4:00 pm, ESPN+		at Florida Gulf Coast	L 50–68	4–10 (0–1)	Alico Arena (2,225); Fort Myers, FL
Jan 8, 2019; 7:00 pm, ESPN+		at Stetson	L 52–69	4–11 (0–2)	Edmunds Center (319); DeLand, FL
Jan 12, 2019; 4:30 pm, ESPN+		Jacksonville	L 52–64	4–12 (0–3)	Vines Center (1,707); Lynchburg, VA
Jan 15, 2019; 7:00 pm, ESPN+		at Kennesaw State	W 67–61	5–12 (1–3)	KSU Convocation Center (415); Kennesaw, GA
Jan 19, 2019; 2:00 pm, ESPN+		North Florida	W 69–53	6–12 (2–3)	Vines Center (1,304); Lynchburg, VA
Jan 26, 2019; 2:00 pm, ESPN+		at Jacksonville	W 85–75 ^{OT}	7–12 (3–3)	Swisher Gymnasium; Jacksonville, FL
Jan 29, 2019; 7:30 pm, ESPN+		at Lipscomb	W 77–60	8–12 (4–3)	Allen Arena (790); Nashville, TN
Feb 2, 2019; 2:00 pm, ESPN+		NJIT	W 58–47	9–12 (5–3)	Vines Center (1,302); Lynchburg, VA
Feb 5, 2019; 11:00 am, ESPN+		Stetson	L 56–68	9–13 (5–4)	Vines Center (1,638); Lynchburg, VA
Feb 9, 2019; 12:00 pm, ESPN+		Florida Gulf Coast	L 64–65	9–14 (5–5)	Vines Center (1,410); Lynchburg, VA
Feb 12, 2019; 7:00 pm, ESPN+		Lipscomb	W 74–60	10–14 (6–5)	Vines Center (1,416); Lynchburg, VA
Feb 16, 2019; 2:00 pm, ESPN+		at North Alabama	W 61–57	11–14 (7–5)	Flowers Hall (1,198); Florence, AL
Feb 23, 2019; 1:00 pm, ESPN+		at North Florida	L 54–66	11–15 (7–6)	UNF Arena (387); Jacksonville, FL
Feb 26, 2019; 5:00 pm, ESPN+		Kennesaw State	W 68–55	12–15 (8–6)	Vines Center (1,516); Lynchburg, VA
Mar 2, 2019; 1:00 pm, ESPN+		NJIT	W 58–39	13–15 (9–6)	Vines Center (401); Lynchburg, VA
Mar 5, 2019; 7:00 pm, ESPN+		North Alabama	W 61–48	14–15 (10–6)	Vines Center (1,224); Lynchburg, VA
Atlantic Sun Women's Tournament
Mar 8, 2019; 7:00 pm, ESPN+	(3)	(6) Jacksonville; Quarterfinals	W 65–53	15–15	Vines Center (190); Lynchburg, VA
Mar 13, 2019; 7:00 pm, ESPN+	(3)	(5) North Florida; Semifinals	W 65–51	16–15	Vines Center (365); Lynchburg, VA
Mar 17, 2019; 3:00 pm, ESPN+	(3)	at (1) Florida Gulf Coast; Championship Game	L 49–72	16–16	Alico Arena (2,557); Fort Myers, FL
*Non-conference game. ^{#}Rankings from AP Poll. (#) Tournament seedings in parentheses. All times are in Eastern Time.

== See also ==
- 2018–19 Liberty Flames basketball team
