= Vanessa Blair-Lewis =

American college basketball coach

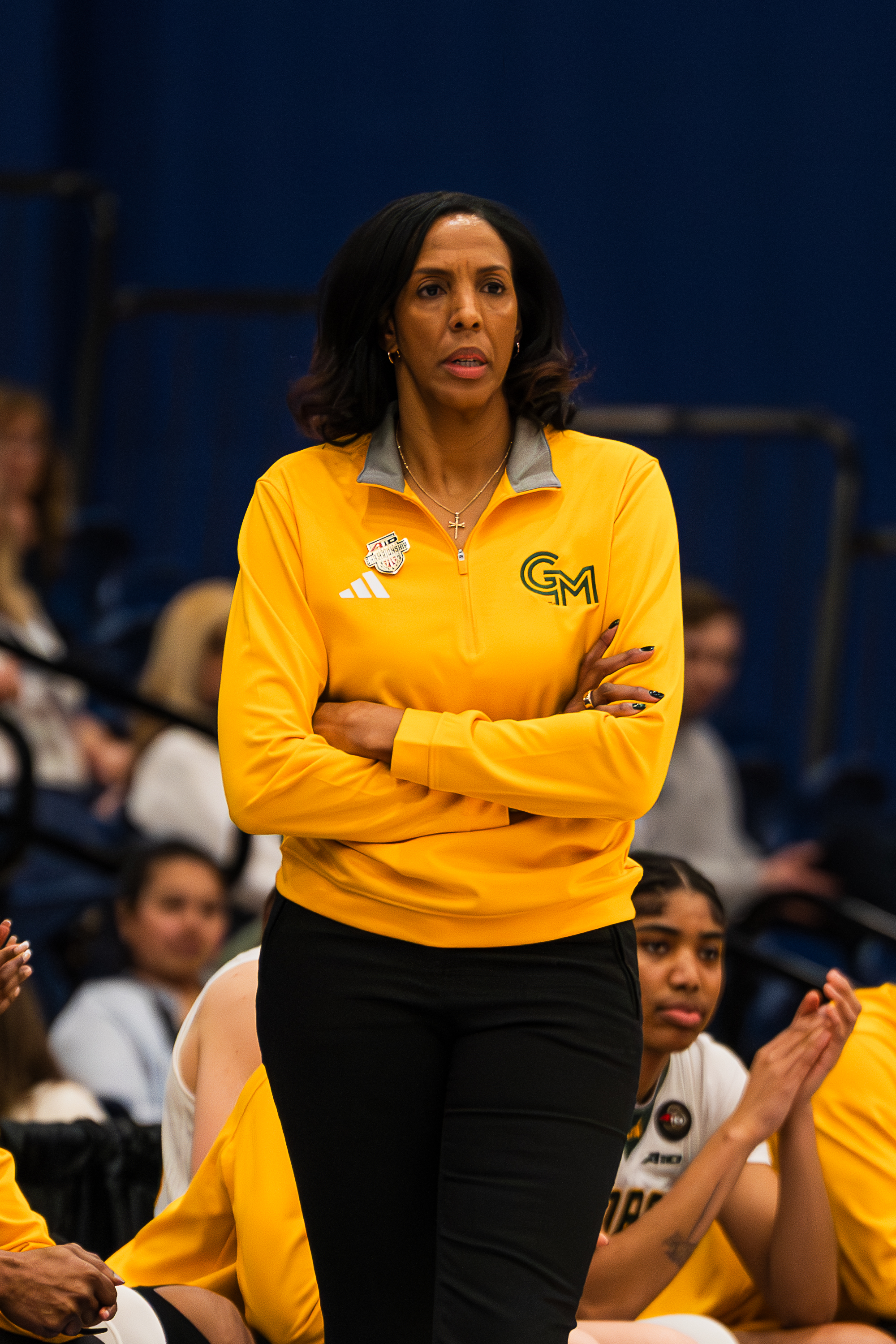
- Blair-Lewis at the 2026 Atlantic 10 Women's Basketball Championship Tournament at the Henrico Sports & Events Center

Current position
- Title: Head coach
- Team: George Mason
- Conference: Atlantic 10
- Record: 101–58 (.635)

Coaching career (HC unless noted)
- 1998–2007: Mount St. Mary's
- 2008–2020: Bethune–Cookman
- 2021–present: George Mason

Head coaching record
- Overall: 417–361 (.536)

Accomplishments and honors

Championships
- NEC regular season (1999); NEC regular season (2001); MEAC regular season (2016); MEAC regular season (2017); MEAC regular season (2018); MEAC tournament (2019); MEAC regular season (2020); Atlantic 10 tournament (2025); Atlantic 10 regular season (2026)

Vanessa Blair-Lewis is an American college basketball coach who is currently the head coach of the George Mason Patriots women's basketball team. She was previously the head coach of the women's basketball teams at Mount St. Mary's University and Bethune–Cookman University.

== Career ==
Blair-Lewis played basketball at Largo High School in Largo, Maryland, where her father was the head coach. From 1988 to 1992, she attended and played for Mount St. Mary's; after graduating, she played professionally for two years in Sweden. She began coaching as an assistant at her alma mater under head coach Bill Sheahan; when Sheehan retired in 1998, he appointed her as head coach. She led the Mount St. Mary's women's basketball team until 2007, when she retired to spend time with her family.

Blair-Lewis returned to coaching the next year, when she took the head coaching position at Bethune–Cookman. She coached at Bethune–Cookman until 2020; during her time there, she was awarded Mid-Eastern Athletic Conference Coach of the Year four times, and she led the team to its first appearance in the NCAA Division I women's basketball tournament in 2019. She was hired as head coach at George Mason in 2021. The team had lost all of its conference matches the season before her arrival; to motivate the team, she hung a banner in their practice gym proclaiming them "Future Women's Atlantic 10 Champions". Her prediction ultimately came true, as the team won the 2025 Atlantic 10 women's basketball tournament and made its first appearance in the NCAA tournament.

== Personal life ==
Blair-Lewis is married to NBA referee Eric Lewis.

== Head coaching record ==
Record table
Season	Team	Overall	Conference	Standing	Postseason
Mount St. Mary's (Northeast Conference) (1998–2007)
1998–99	Mount St. Mary's	21–7	18–2	1st	
1999–2000	Mount St. Mary's	20–9	14–4	2nd	
2000–01	Mount St. Mary's	15–14	13–5	1st	
2001–02	Mount St. Mary's	12–16	9–9	7th	
2002–03	Mount St. Mary's	10–18	8–10	8th	
2003–04	Mount St. Mary's	9–19	8–10	6th	
2004–05	Mount St. Mary's	9–19	8–10	6th	
2005–06	Mount St. Mary's	12–16	9–9	6th	
2006–07	Mount St. Mary's	12–17	10–8	4th	
Mount St. Mary's:		120–135 (.471)			
Bethune–Cookman (Mid-Eastern Athletic Conference) (2008–2020)
2008–09	Bethune–Cookman	12–17	4–12	9th	
2009–10	Bethune–Cookman	17–15	9–7	5th	
2010–11	Bethune–Cookman	13–17	7–10	9th	
2011–12	Bethune–Cookman	10–19	7–9	7th	
2012–13	Bethune–Cookman	12–17	7–9	8th	
2013–14	Bethune–Cookman	12–18	8–8	6th	
2014–15	Bethune–Cookman	13–17	9–7	5th	
2015–16	Bethune–Cookman	18–13	12–4	1st	
2016–17	Bethune–Cookman	21–11	15–1	1st	
2017–18	Bethune–Cookman	24–7	15–1	1st	
2018–19	Bethune–Cookman	21–11	11–5	3rd	NCAA 1st Round
2019–20	Bethune–Cookman	23–6	15–1	1st	
Bethune–Cookman:		196–168 (.538)			
George Mason (Atlantic 10 Conference) (2021–present)
2021–22	George Mason	10–19	3–12	14th	
2022–23	George Mason	16–15	8–8	9th	
2023–24	George Mason	23–8	14–4	4th	WBIT 1st Round
2024–25	George Mason	27–6	14–4	2nd	NCAA 1st Round
2025–26	George Mason	23–10	16–2	T–1st	WBIT 1st Round
2026–27	George Mason	2–0	0-0		
George Mason:		101–58 (.635)			
Total:		417–361 (.536)			
National champion Postseason invitational champion Conference regular season champion Conference regular season and conference tournament champion Division regular season champion Division regular season and conference tournament champion Conference tournament champion
