= 2018–19 Lipscomb Bisons women's basketball team =

Intercollegiate basketball season

2018–19 Lipscomb Bisons women's basketball
- Conference: Atlantic Sun Conference
- Record: 4–25 (2–14 A-Sun)
- Head coach: Greg Brown (7th season)
- Assistant coaches: Hannah Phillips; Clay Crothers; Aaron Holland
- Home arena: Allen Arena

2018–19 ASUN women's basketball standings
	Conf.				Overall
Team	W		L	PCT	W		L	PCT
Florida Gulf Coast †	16	–	0	1.000	28	–	5	.848
Stetson	11	–	5	.688	16	–	16	.500
North Alabama	10	–	6	.625	21	–	9	.700
Liberty	10	–	6	.625	16	–	16	.500
North Florida	9	–	7	.563	15	–	14	.517
Jacksonville	7	–	9	.438	14	–	16	.467
Kennesaw State	4	–	12	.250	9	–	22	.290
NJIT	3	–	13	.188	6	–	24	.200
Lipscomb	2	–	14	.125	4	–	25	.138
† 2019 ASUN Tournament winner Rankings from AP poll

The 2018–19 Lipscomb Bisons women's basketball team represented Lipscomb University in the 2018–19 NCAA Division I women's basketball season. The Bisons, led by seventh year head coach Greg Brown, played their home games at Allen Arena and were members of the Atlantic Sun Conference. They finished the season 4–25, 2–14 in America Sun play to finish in last place. They failed to qualify for the Atlantic Sun women's tournament.

On March 8, Greg Brown was fired after 7 seasons at his alma mater, in which the Bisons went 44–164 overall.

== Media ==
All home games and conference road are shown on ESPN3 or A-Sun. TV. Non conference road games are typically available on the opponents website.

== Roster ==
2018–19 Lipscomb Bisons women's basketball team
Players
Coaches

Pos.	#	Name	Height	Year	Previous school	Hometown
G	0	Sydney Shelton (redshirt)	5 ft 9 in (1.75 m)	Jr	Mt. Vernon; Butler	Greenfield, IN
F	4	Emily Kmec	6 ft 2 in (1.88 m)	RS So	Carmel	Carmel, IN
G	5	Carleigh Short	5 ft 6 in (1.68 m)	Jr	Hendersonville	Hendersonville, TN
G	10	Gracie Simpson	5 ft 6 in (1.68 m)	Fr	Lipscomb Academy	Nashville, TN
G/F	11	Taylor Hammack	6 ft 0 in (1.83 m)	Fr	Batesville	Batesville, AR
F	12	Keely Morrow	5 ft 10 in (1.78 m)	Fr	Bowling Green	Bowling Green, KY
G	14	Lexi Manos	5 ft 5 in (1.65 m)	Jr	Hoover	North Canton, OH
G	15	Lauren Rau	5 ft 5 in (1.65 m)	Jr	Center Grove	Greenwood, IN
G	20	Jane Deason	5 ft 9 in (1.75 m)	Fr	Station Camp	Hendersonville, TN
G	21	Kaylee Cotton	5 ft 10 in (1.78 m)	Jr	McCreary Central	Stearns, KY
G	22	Taylor Clark	5 ft 9 in (1.75 m)	So	Lawrence County	Lawrenceburg, TN
G	23	Anna Hammaker	5 ft 10 in (1.78 m)	RS Jr	Christian Academy of Knoxville; Kansas State	Knoxville, TN
F	25	Gabi Grillon	6 ft 3 in (1.91 m)	Fr	East River	Orlando, FL
F	44	Kailey Rosenbaum	6 ft 1 in (1.85 m)	Fr	Dickson County	Dickson, TN

Head coach

- Greg Brown (Lipscomb)

Assistant coach(es)

- Hannah Phillips (Lipscomb)
- Aaron Holland (Arkansas State)
- Clay Crothers (Lipscomb)

Legend

- (C) Team captain
- (S) Suspended
- (I) Ineligible
- (W) Walk-on
- Injured
- Current redshirt

Roster

== Schedule ==
Date time, TV	Rank^{#}	Opponent^{#}	Result	Record	Site (attendance) city, state
Exhibition
Nov 6, 2018*; 5:00 pm		Cincinnati Christian	W 69–51		Allen Arena; Nashville, TN
Non-conference regular season
Nov 9, 2018*; 6:30 pm, ESPN+		Tennessee State	W 64–62	1–0	Allen Arena (1,544); Nashville, TN
Nov 11, 2018*; 1:00 pm, ESPN3		at Clemson	L 26–68	1–1	Littlejohn Coliseum (809); Clemson, SC
Nov 15, 2018*; 6:00 pm		at Alabama A&M	W 62–58	2–1	Elmore Gymnasium; Huntsville, AL
Nov 15, 2018*; 1:30 pm, ESPN+		Jacksonville State	L 46–58	2–2	Allen Arena (115); Nashville, TN
Nov 20, 2018*; 6:00 pm, ESPN+		at Murray State	L 61–97	2–3	CFSB Center (448); Murray, KY
Nov 24, 2018*; 1:00 pm		at Cincinnati	L 55–71	2–4	Fifth Third Arena (833); Cincinnati, OH
Nov 29, 2018*; 7:00 pm, ESPN+		at Austin Peay	L 58–70	2–5	Dunn Center (344); Clarksville, TN
Dec 4, 2018*; 5:00 pm, ESPN+		at Belmont; Battle of the Boulevard	L 43–83	2–6	Curb Event Center (1,341); Nashville, TN
Dec 4, 2018*; 4:00 pm, ESPN+		UT Martin	L 53–62	2–7	Allen Arena (1,446); Nashville, TN
Dec 4, 2018*; 3:00 pm, ESPN+		College of Charleston	L 63–65	2–8	Allen Arena (215); Nashville, TN
Dec 19, 2018*; 10:00 am		at Georgia	L 45–77	2–9	Stegeman Coliseum (7,090); Athens, GA
Dec 21, 2018*; 5:00 pm, ESPN+		Tennessee Tech	L 52–67	2–10	Allen Arena (215); Nashville, TN
Dec 29, 2018*; 11:00 am, ESPN+		at Morehead State	L 44–79	2–11	Ellis Johnson Arena (535); Morehead, KY
Atlantic Sun regular season
Jan 5, 2019; 12:00 pm, ESPN+		at Jacksonville	L 47–62	2–12 (0–1)	Swisher Gymnasium (374); Jacksonville, FL
Jan 8, 2019; 6:30 pm, ESPN+		North Florida	L 53–68	2–13 (0–2)	Allen Arena (870); Nashville, TN
Jan 12, 2019; 1:30 pm, ESPN+		Stetson	L 65–80	2–14 (0–3)	Allen Arena; Nashville, TN
Jan 15, 2019; 10:30 am, ESPN+		at NJIT	L 67–80	2–15 (0–4)	Wellness and Events Center (1,903); Newark, DE
Jan 22, 2019; 6:00 pm, ESPN+		at Florida Gulf Coast	L 40–82	2–16 (0–5)	Alico Arena (2,133); Fort Myers, FL
Jan 26, 2019; 12:00 pm, ESPN+		at Stetson	L 49–76	2–17 (0–6)	Edmunds Center (386); DeLand, FL
Jan 29, 2019; 6:30 pm, ESPN+		Liberty	L 40–77	2–18 (0–7)	Allen Arena (790); Nashville, TN
Feb 2, 2019; 1:30 pm, ESPN+		North Alabama	L 60–81	2–19 (0–8)	Allen Arena; Nashville, TN
Feb 5, 2019; 6:00 pm, ESPN+		at North Florida	L 66–72	2–20 (0–9)	UNF Arena (436); Jacksonville, FL
Feb 9, 2019; 1:30 pm, ESPN+		Jacksonville	W 61–58	3–20 (1–9)	Allen Arena; Nashville, TN
Feb 12, 2019; 6:00 pm, ESPN+		at Liberty	L 60–74	3–21 (1–10)	Vines Center (1,416); Lynchburg, VA
Feb 16, 2019; 1:00 pm, ESPN+		at Kennesaw State	L 36–67	3–22 (1–11)	KSU Convocation Center (617); Kennesaw, GA
Feb 19, 2019; 6:30 pm, Facebook Live		Florida Gulf Coast	L 46–80	3–23 (1–12)	Allen Arena (135); Nashville, TN
Feb 27, 2019; 6:30 pm, ESPN+		NJIT	L 53–69	3–24 (1–13)	Allen Arena (807); Nashville, TN
Mar 2, 2019; 1:00 pm, ESPN+		at North Alabama	L 50–71	3–25 (1–14)	Flowers Hall (1,104); Florence, AL
Mar 5, 2019; 6:30 pm, ESPN+		Kennesaw State	W 72–69 ^{OT}	4–25 (2–14)	Allen Arena (152); Nashville, TN
*Non-conference game. ^{#}Rankings from AP Poll. (#) Tournament seedings in parentheses. All times are in Central Time.

== See also ==
- 2018–19 Lipscomb Bisons men's basketball team
