= 2018–19 Jacksonville Dolphins women's basketball team =

Intercollegiate basketball season

2018–19 Jacksonville Dolphins women's basketball
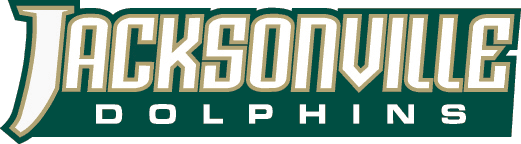
- Conference: Atlantic Sun Conference
- Record: 14–16 (7–9 A-Sun)
- Head coach: Darnell Haney (1st season)
- Assistant coaches: Dawn Brown; Briona Brown; Stephanie Edwards
- Home arena: Swisher Gymnasium

2018–19 ASUN women's basketball standings
	Conf.				Overall
Team	W		L	PCT	W		L	PCT
Florida Gulf Coast †	16	–	0	1.000	28	–	5	.848
Stetson	11	–	5	.688	16	–	16	.500
North Alabama	10	–	6	.625	21	–	9	.700
Liberty	10	–	6	.625	16	–	16	.500
North Florida	9	–	7	.563	15	–	14	.517
Jacksonville	7	–	9	.438	14	–	16	.467
Kennesaw State	4	–	12	.250	9	–	22	.290
NJIT	3	–	13	.188	6	–	24	.200
Lipscomb	2	–	14	.125	4	–	25	.138
† 2019 ASUN Tournament winner Rankings from AP poll

The 2018–19 Jacksonville Dolphins women's basketball team represented Jacksonville University in the 2018–19 NCAA Division I women's basketball season. The Dolphins, led by first year head coach Darnell Haney, played their home games at Swisher Gymnasium and were members of the Atlantic Sun Conference. They finished the season 14–16, 7–9 in A-Sun play finish in sixth place. They lost in the quarterfinals of the 2019 ASUN women's basketball tournament to Liberty.

== Media ==
All home games and conference road games are shown on ESPN3 or A-Sun.TV.

== Roster ==
2018–19 Jacksonville Dolphins women's basketball team
Players
Coaches

Pos.	#	Name	Height	Year	Previous school	Hometown
G	0	Kiara Meeks	5 ft 9 in (1.75 m)	Jr	Lake Worth Community; Florida SouthWestern State	Lake Worth, FL
F	1	Trudy Walker	5 ft 11 in (1.8 m)	Sr	Fort Pierce Westwood; Eastern Florida State	Port St. Lucie, FL
G	2	Erin Wilson	5 ft 10 in (1.78 m)	Fr	Auburndale	Auburndale, FL
G	3	Rolanda Hayes	5 ft 7 in (1.7 m)	RS Sr	Viera; Florida Atlantic	Rockledge, FL
G	4	Alexis Pierce	5 ft 9 in (1.75 m)	So	Sol C. Johnson	Savannah, GA
G	11	Kayla Nevitt	5 ft 10 in (1.78 m)	RS Sr	Andy Dekaney HS; Mississippi State	Houston, TX
G	13	Mariah Batz	5 ft 7 in (1.7 m)	Jr	Astronaut; Eastern Florida State	Titusville, FL
G	15	Johné Stewart	5 ft 7 in (1.7 m)	Fr	Central	Memphis, TN
C	20	Shalonda Neely	6 ft 0 in (1.83 m)	RS Jr	Arlington Country Day	Freeport, Grand Bahama
G	21	Lindsay John	5 ft 11 in (1.8 m)	Sr	Lycée Victor Hugo; Tallahassee CC	Cholet, France
G	22	Alexis Burns	5 ft 8 in (1.73 m)	Jr	Carver	Columbus, GA
F/C	23	Khadijah Brown	6 ft 4 in (1.93 m)	Jr	South Miami	Miami, FL
G	24	Jasmyn Brown	5 ft 10 in (1.78 m)	Sr	Haines City	Haines City, FL
F/C	32	Amber Bender	6 ft 2 in (1.88 m)	Jr	Calvary Christian Academy	Fort Lauderdale, FL

Head coach

- Darnell Haney (Florida A&M)

Assistant coach(es)

- Dawn Brown (Jackson State)
- Briona Brown (Jacksonville)
- Stephanie Edwards (Jacksonville)

Legend

- (C) Team captain
- (S) Suspended
- (I) Ineligible
- (W) Walk-on
- Injured
- Current redshirt

Roster

== Schedule ==
Date time, TV	Rank^{#}	Opponent^{#}	Result	Record	Site (attendance) city, state
Non-conference regular season
Nov 7, 2018*; 7:00 pm, ESPN+		Webber International	W 73–39	1–0	Swisher Gymnasium (607); Jacksonville, FL
Nov 11, 2018*; 7:00 pm		at No. 20 Texas A&M	L 53–73	1–1	Reed Arena (3,012); College Station, TX
Nov 15, 2018*; 7:00 pm, ACCNE		at Florida State	L 46–79	1–2	Donald L. Tucker Center (2,367); Tallahassee, FL
Nov 19, 2018*; 7:00 pm		at Savannah State	W 68–58	2–2	Tiger Arena (375); Savannah, GA
Nov 24, 2018*; 4:00 pm		vs. Old Dominion; Buccaneer Classic	L 76–78 ^{OT}	2–3	CSU Field House (355); Charleston, SC
Nov 25, 2018*; 4:30 pm		at Charleston Southern; Buccaneer Classic	W 68–58	3–3	CSU Field House (228); Charleston, SC
Nov 28, 2018*; 7:00 pm		Bethune–Cookman	L 56–58	3–4	Swisher Gymnasium (508); Jacksonville, FL
Dec 2, 2018*; 2:00 pm		at Penn State	L 61–80	3–5	Bryce Jordan Center (2,121); University Park, PA
Dec 15, 2018*; 2:00 pm, ESPN+		Edwards Waters	W 100–46	4–5	Swisher Gymnasium (159); Jacksonville, FL
Dec 20, 2018*; 12:00 pm		Warner (FL)	W 105–55	5–5	Swisher Gymnasium (72); Jacksonville, FL
Dec 21, 2018*; 1:00 pm		at Alabama A&M	L 60–65	5–6	Elmore Gymnasium (113); Huntsville, AL
Dec 30, 2018*; 2:00 pm		at FIU	W 73–62	6–6	Ocean Bank Convocation Center; Miami, FL
Jan 2, 2019*; 2:00 pm, ESPN+		Mercer	W 71–66	7–6	Swisher Gymnasium (445); Jacksonville, FL
Atlantic Sun regular season
Jan 5, 2019; 1:00 pm, ESPN+		Lipscomb	W 62–47	8–6 (1–0)	Swisher Gymnasium (374); Jacksonville, FL
Jan 8, 2019; 7:00 pm, ESPN+		at Kennesaw State	L 55–75	8–7 (1–1)	KSU Convocation Center (575); Kennesaw, GA
Jan 12, 2019; 4:30 pm, ESPN+		at Liberty	W 64–52	9–7 (2–1)	Vines Center (1,707); Lynchburg, VA
Jan 15, 2019; 1:00 pm, ESPN+		North Alabama	L 59–62	9–8 (2–2)	Swisher Gymnasium (179); Jacksonville, FL
Jan 19, 2019; 1:00 pm, ESPN+		at NJIT	W 61–56	10–8 (3–2)	Wellness and Events Center (195); Newark, DE
Jan 22, 2019; 7:00 pm, ESPN+		at North Florida	W 80–72	11–8 (4–2)	UNF Arena (501); Jacksonville, FL
Jan 26, 2019; 2:00 pm, ESPN+		Liberty	L 75–85 ^{OT}	11–9 (4–3)	Swisher Gymnasium; Jacksonville, FL
Jan 29, 2019; 7:00 pm, ESPN+		Stetson	L 56–69	11–10 (4–4)	Swisher Gymnasium (117); Jacksonville, FL
Feb 2, 2019; 4:00 pm, ESPN+		at Florida Gulf Coast	L 58–82	11–11 (4–5)	Alico Arena (2,523); Fort Myers, FL
Feb 5, 2019; 7:00 pm, ESPN+		Kennesaw State	W 68–53	12–11 (5–5)	Swisher Gymnasium (391); Jacksonville, FL
Feb 9, 2019; 2:30 pm, ESPN+		at Lipscomb	L 58–61	12–12 (5–6)	Allen Arena; Nashville, TN
Feb 12, 2019; 7:00 pm, ESPN+		at Stetson	L 46–54	12–13 (5–7)	Edmunds Center (384); DeLand, FL
Feb 19, 2019; 7:00 pm, ESPN+		North Florida	W 75–63	13–13 (6–7)	Swisher Gymnasium (402); Jacksonville, FL
Feb 23, 2019; 1:00 pm, ESPN+		NJIT	W 69–55	14–13 (7–7)	Swisher Gymnasium (75); Jacksonville, FL
Feb 27, 2019; 7:00 pm, ESPN+		at North Alabama	L 59–68	14–14 (7–8)	Flowers Hall (989); Florence, AL
Mar 2, 2019; 2:00 pm, ESPN+		Florida Gulf Coast	L 62–68	14–15 (7–9)	Swisher Gymnasium (513); Jacksonville, FL
Atlantic Sun Women's Tournament
Mar 8, 2019; 7:00 pm, ESPN+	(6)	at (3) Liberty; Quarterfinals	L 53–65	14–16	Vines Center (190); Lynchburg, VA
*Non-conference game. ^{#}Rankings from AP Poll. (#) Tournament seedings in parentheses. All times are in Eastern Time.

== Rankings ==
2018–19 NCAA Division I women's basketball rankings

+ Regular season polls	Poll	Pre- Season	Week 2	Week 3	Week 4	Week 5	Week 6	Week 7	Week 8	Week 9	Week 10	Week 11	Week 12	Week 13	Week 14	Week 15	Week 16	Week 17	Week 18	Week 19	Final
AP																				N/A	
Coaches																					

Legend
	Increase in ranking
	Decrease in ranking
	No change
(RV)	Received votes
(NR)	Not ranked

== See also ==
- 2018–19 Jacksonville Dolphins men's basketball team
