= 2018–19 Kennesaw State Owls women's basketball team =

Intercollegiate basketball season

2018–19 Kennesaw State Owls women's basketball
- Conference: Atlantic Sun Conference
- Record: 9–22 (4–12 Atlantic Sun)
- Head coach: Agnus Berenato (3rd season)
- Assistant coaches: Khadija Head; Sherill Baker; Lanay Montgomery
- Home arena: KSU Convocation Center

2018–19 ASUN women's basketball standings
| | Conf. | | | | Overall |
| Team | W | | L | PCT | W | | L | PCT |
|---|---|---|---|---|---|---|---|---|
| Florida Gulf Coast † | 16 | – | 0 | 1.000 | 28 | – | 5 | .848 |
| Stetson | 11 | – | 5 | .688 | 16 | – | 16 | .500 |
| North Alabama | 10 | – | 6 | .625 | 21 | – | 9 | .700 |
| Liberty | 10 | – | 6 | .625 | 16 | – | 16 | .500 |
| North Florida | 9 | – | 7 | .563 | 15 | – | 14 | .517 |
| Jacksonville | 7 | – | 9 | .438 | 14 | – | 16 | .467 |
| Kennesaw State | 4 | – | 12 | .250 | 9 | – | 22 | .290 |
| NJIT | 3 | – | 13 | .188 | 6 | – | 24 | .200 |
| Lipscomb | 2 | – | 14 | .125 | 4 | – | 25 | .138 |
† 2019 ASUN Tournament winner Rankings from AP poll

The 2018–19 Kennesaw State Owls women's basketball team represented Kennesaw State University during the 2018–19 NCAA Division I women's basketball season. The Owls, led by third-year head coach Agnus Berenato, played their home games at the KSU Convocation Center and were members of the Atlantic Sun Conference. They finished the season 9–22, 4–12 in A-Sun play to finish in seventh place. They advanced to the semifinals of the A-Sun Tournament, where they lost to Florida Gulf Coast.

== Roster ==
2018–19 Kennesaw State Owls women's basketball team
Players
Coaches

| Pos. | # | Name | Height | Year | Previous school | Hometown |
|---|---|---|---|---|---|---|
| G | 0 | Amani Johnson | 5 ft 6 in (1.68 m) | Fr | East Allegheny | North Versailles, PA |
| G | 2 | Kamiyah Street | 5 ft 5 in (1.65 m) | So | Mays | Atlanta, GA |
| F | 10 | Alexis Poole | 6 ft 2 in (1.88 m) | So | Stockbridge | Ellenwood, GA |
| G | 11 | Kate Head | 5 ft 5 in (1.65 m) | Fr | Ipswich Girls' Grammar School | Brisbane, Australia |
| G/F | 12 | Alexandra Landby | 6 ft 2 in (1.88 m) | RS Jr | Norra Real | Stockholm, Sweden |
| F/C | 13 | Carlotta Gianolla | 6 ft 1 in (1.85 m) | Jr | Francesco Algarotti | Marcon, Italy |
| C | 14 | Simina Avram | 6 ft 3 in (1.91 m) | RS Sr | Andrei Saguna; Georgia Tech | Brasov, Romania |
| G | 21 | Breanna Hoover | 5 ft 6 in (1.68 m) | So | Blackhawk | Beaver Falls, PA |
| G | 24 | Iceis Walker | 5 ft 7 in (1.7 m) | Sr | Mountain View | Lawrenceville, GA |
| F | 32 | Janae Omusi | 6 ft 0 in (1.83 m) | Sr | Saddleback | San Diego, CA |
| F | 33 | Lexi Mann | 6 ft 1 in (1.85 m) | So | Greater Atlanta Christian School | Stone Mountain, GA |
| G | 44 | Peyton Lewis | 5 ft 9 in (1.75 m) | Fr | Locust Grove | Hampton, GA |

Head coach

- Agnus Berenato (Mount St. Mary's)

Assistant coach(es)

- Khadija Head (Murray State)
- Sherill Baker (Georgia)
- Lanay Montgomery (West Virginia)

Legend

- (C) Team captain
- (S) Suspended
- (I) Ineligible
- (W) Walk-on
- Injured
- Current redshirt

Roster

== Schedule ==
| Date time, TV | Rank^{#} | Opponent^{#} | Result | Record | Site (attendance) city, state |
Exhibition
| Nov 1, 2018*; 5:30 pm | | Thomas | W 80–61 | | KSU Convocation Center; Kennesaw, GA |
Non-conference regular season
| Nov 7, 2018*; 5:30 pm, ESPN+ | | Middle Georgia State | W 80–70 | 1–0 | KSU Convocation Center (901); Kennesaw, GA |
| Nov 10, 2018*; 12:00 pm | | at Seton Hall; Seton Hall Tip-Off | L 80–102 | 1–1 | Walsh Gymnasium (707); South Orange, NJ |
| Nov 11, 2018*; 11:00 am | | vs. UMBC; Seton Hall Tip-Off | L 53–57 | 1–2 | Walsh Gymnasium (307); South Orange, NJ |
| Nov 14, 2018*; 7:00 pm, ESPN+ | | Furman | W 74–63 | 2–2 | KSU Convocation Center (395); Kennesaw, GA |
| Nov 18, 2018*; 5:00 pm | | at East Carolina | L 56–68 | 2–3 | Williams Arena (802); Greenville, NC |
| Nov 22, 2018*; 9:00 pm | | vs. Idaho State; Cancún Challenge Riviera Division | L 49–60 | 2–4 | Hard Rock Hotel Riviera Maya (300); Cancún, Mexico |
| Nov 23, 2018*; 9:00 pm | | vs. Michigan State; Cancún Challenge Riviera Division | L 51–75 | 2–5 | Hard Rock Hotel Riviera Maya (300); Cancún, Mexico |
| Nov 28, 2018*; 7:00 pm, ESPN+ | | Georgia Southern | W 78–59 | 3–5 | KSU Convocation Center (415); Kennesaw, GA |
| Dec 1, 2018*; 2:00 pm, ESPN+ | | at Mercer | L 48–64 | 3–6 | Hawkins Arena (565); Macon, GA |
| Dec 13, 2018*; 6:00 pm, ESPN+ | | at Georgia State | L 73–79 ^{OT} | 3–7 | GSU Sports Arena (415); Atlanta, GA |
| Dec 16, 2018*; 4:00 pm, ACCNE | | at Georgia Tech | L 35–60 | 3–8 | McCamish Pavilion (1,014); Atlanta, GA |
| Dec 20, 2018*; 3:00 pm | | vs. Bethune–Cookman; GSU Holiday Classic | L 61–64 | 3–9 | GSU Sports Arena (309); Atlanta, GA |
| Dec 21, 2018*; 1:00 pm | | vs. North Carolina Central; GSU Holiday Classic | W 78–54 | 4–9 | GSU Sports Arena (319); Atlanta, GA |
Atlantic Sun Conference season
| Jan 5, 2019; 1:00 pm, ESPN+ | | at NJIT | L 60–66 | 4–10 (0–1) | Wellness and Events Center (330); Newark, NJ |
| Jan 8, 2019; 7:00 pm, ESPN+ | | Jacksonville | W 75–55 | 5–10 (1–1) | KSU Convocation Center (575); Kennesaw, GA |
| Jan 15, 2019; 7:00 pm, ESPN+ | | Liberty | L 61–67 | 5–11 (1–2) | KSU Convocation Center (415); Kennesaw, GA |
| Jan 20, 2019; 2:00 pm, ESPN+ | | Florida Gulf Coast | L 46–69 | 5–12 (1–3) | KSU Convocation Center; Kennesaw, GA |
| Jan 22, 2019; 7:00 pm, ESPN+ | | at North Alabama | L 55–80 | 5–13 (1–4) | Flowers Hall (1,108); Florence, AL |
| Jan 29, 2019; 11:00 am, ESPN+ | | North Florida | L 60–71 | 5–14 (1–5) | KSU Convocation Center (365); Kennesaw, GA |
| Feb 2, 2019; 1:00 pm, ESPN+ | | at Stetson | L 69–76 | 5–15 (1–6) | Edmunds Center (313); DeLand, FL |
| Feb 5, 2019; 7:00 pm, ESPN+ | | at Jacksonville | L 53–68 | 4–10 (0–1) | Swisher Gymnasium (391); Jacksonville, FL |
| Feb 9, 2019; 2:00 pm, ESPN+ | | NJIT | W 70–47 | 6–16 (2–7) | KSU Convocation Center (1,374); Kennesaw, GA |
| Feb 12, 2019; 7:00 pm, ESPN+ | | at North Florida | L 66–74 | 6–17 (2–8) | UNF Arena (348); Jacksonville, FL |
| Feb 16, 2019; 2:00 pm, ESPN+ | | Lipscomb | W 67–36 | 7–17 (3–8) | KSU Convocation Center (617); Kennesaw, GA |
| Feb 19, 2019; 7:00 pm, ESPN+ | | North Alabama | W 74–72 | 8–17 (4–8) | KSU Convocation Center (456); Kennesaw, GA |
| Feb 23, 2019; 2:00 pm, ESPN+ | | at Florida Gulf Coast | L 48–79 | 8–18 (4–9) | Alico Arena (2,522); Fort Myers, FL |
| Feb 26, 2019; 7:00 pm, ESPN+ | | at Liberty | L 55–68 | 8–19 (4–10) | Vines Center (1,516); Lynchburg, VA |
| Mar 2, 2019; 1:00 pm, ESPN+ | | Stetson | L 45–58 | 8–20 (4–11) | KSU Convocation Center (545); Kennesaw, GA |
| Mar 5, 2019; 7:30 pm, ESPN+ | | at Lipscomb | L 69–72 ^{OT} | 8–21 (4–12) | Allen Arena (152); Nashville, TN |
Atlantic Sun Women's Tournament
| March 8, 2019; 7:00 pm, ESPN+ | (7) | at (2) Stetson; Quarterfinals | W 67–59 | 9–21 | Edmunds Center (286); DeLand, FL |
| March 13, 2019; 7:00 pm, ESPN+ | (7) | at (1) Florida Gulf Coast; Semifinals | L 48–77 | 9–22 | Alico Arena (1,822); Fort Myers, FL |
*Non-conference game. ^{#}Rankings from AP Poll. (#) Tournament seedings in parentheses. All times are in Eastern Time.

== Rankings ==
2018–19 NCAA Division I women's basketball rankings

| + Regular season polls | Poll | Pre- season | Week 2 | Week 3 | Week 4 | Week 5 | Week 6 | Week 7 | Week 8 | Week 9 | Week 10 | Week 11 | Week 12 | Week 13 | Week 14 | Week 15 | Week 16 | Week 17 | Week 18 | Week 19 | Final |
| AP | | | | | | | | | | | | | | | | | | | | N/A | |
| Coaches | | | | | | | | | | | | | | | | | | | | | |

Legend
| | Increase in ranking |
| | Decrease in ranking |
| | No change |
| (RV) | Received votes |
| (NR) | Not ranked |

== See also ==
- 2018–19 Kennesaw State Owls men's basketball team
