= Georgetown Hoyas women's basketball =

Women's college basketball program

Georgetown Hoyas
2026–27 Georgetown Hoyas women's basketball team
- University: Georgetown University
- Head coach: Darnell Haney (4th season)
- Location: Washington, D.C.
- Arena: McDonough Gymnasium (capacity: 2,500)
- Conference: Big East
- Nickname: Hoyas
- Colors: Blue and gray

NCAA Division I tournament Sweet Sixteen
- 1993, 2011

NCAA Division I tournament appearances
- 1993, 2010, 2011, 2012

Uniforms
Home	Away

The Georgetown Hoyas women's basketball team is Georgetown University's women's basketball program in the NCAA Division I Big East Conference. The team was first formed in 1970, and joined the Big East in 1983. They play their home games on campus at McDonough Gymnasium.

The women's teams have been invited to the NCAA tournament four times, reaching the Sweet Sixteen in 1993 and 2011, and the second round in 2010 and 2012. They have been invited to the Women's National Invitation Tournament, five times, progressing furthest in 2009 by reaching the fourth round. Former player Rebekkah Brunson, now with the WNBA's Minnesota Lynx, is the team's all-time leading rebounder, while Sugar Rodgers, now with the WNBA's New York Liberty, is the all-time leader in points, steals, and 3-point field goals.

== Year by year results ==
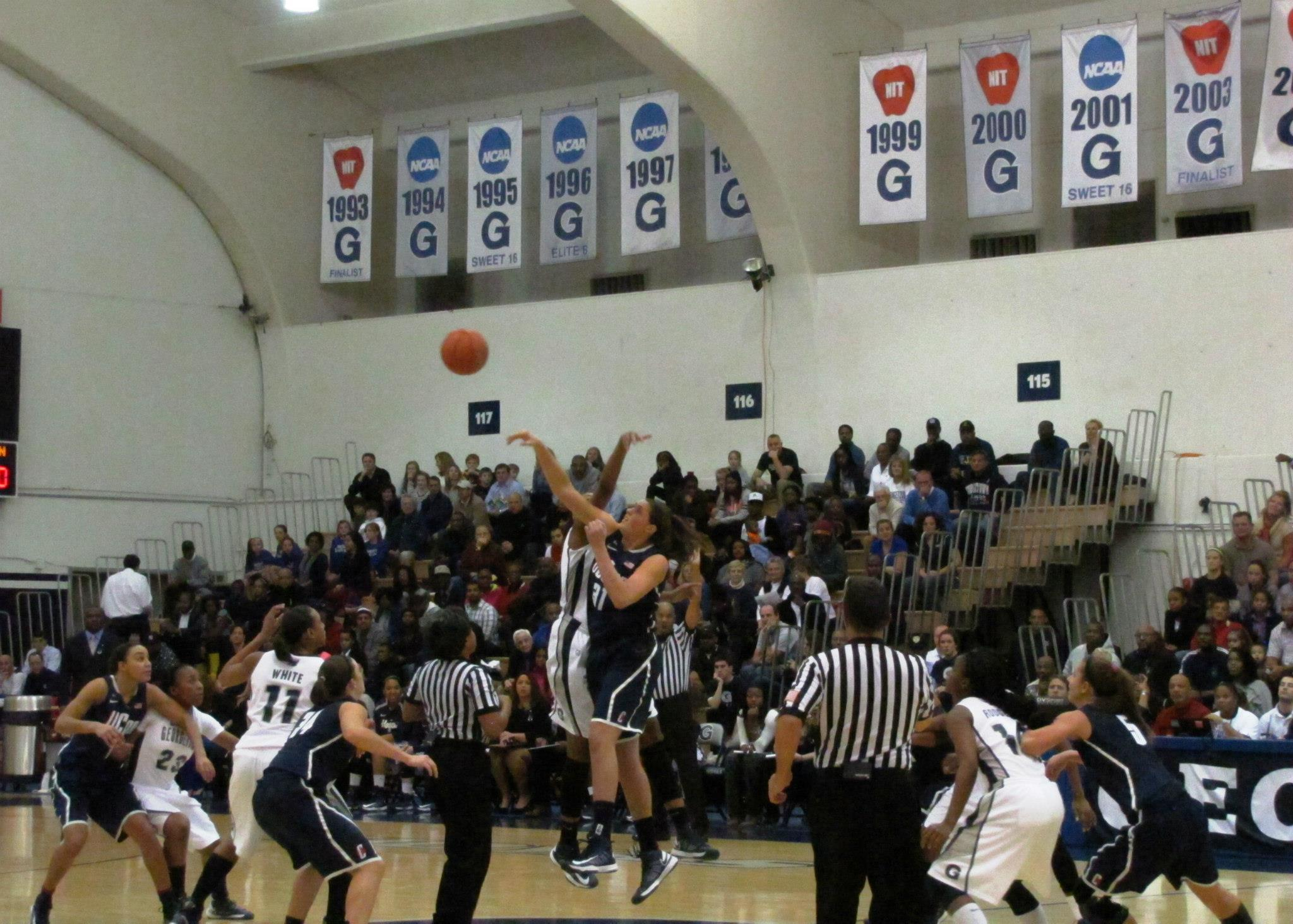
Georgetown and UConn tip off at a game in 2013 at McDonough Arena.

Conference tournament winners noted with # Source

Season	Team	Overall	Conference	Standing	Postseason	Coaches' poll	AP poll
Betty Underwood (Independent) (1970–1974)
1970–71	Betty Underwood	6–5	–				
1971–72	Betty Underwood	8–1	–				
1972–73	Betty Underwood	10–2	–				
1973–74	Betty Underwood	5–4	–				
Betty Underwood:		29–12	–				
Francis Carr (Independent) (1974–1981)
1974–75	Francis Carr	11–5	–				
1975–76	Francis Carr	11–5	–				
1976–77	Francis Carr	10–8	–				
1977–78	Francis Carr	11–9	–				
1978–79	Francis Carr	15–9	–				
1979–80	Francis Carr	21–3	–				
1980–81	Francis Carr	16–7	–				
Francis Carr:		95–46	–				
Mary Briese (Big East) (1981–1983)
1981–82	Mary Briese	9–17	–				
1982–83	Mary Briese	10–15	3–5	T-6th			
Mary Briese:		19–32	3–5				
Cheryl Thompson (Big East) (1983–1986)
1983–84	Cheryl Thompson	10–15	2–6	T-7th			
1984–85	Cheryl Thompson	7–21	3–13	9th			
1985–86	Cheryl Thompson	8–20	3–13	8th			
Cheryl Thompson:		25–56	8–32				
Patrick Knapp (Big East) (1986–2004)
1986–87	Patrick Knapp	7–21	4–12	7th			
1987–88	Patrick Knapp	7–21	3–13	9th			
1988–89	Patrick Knapp	13–16	4–12	8th			
1989–90	Patrick Knapp	13–14	5–11	T-7th			
1990–91	Patrick Knapp	12–15	5–11	7th			
1991–92	Patrick Knapp	20–8	13–5	T-2nd			
1992–93	Patrick Knapp	23–7	15–3	T-1st	NCAA Sixteen	16	
1993–94	Patrick Knapp	12–15	6–12	8th			
1994–95	Patrick Knapp	11–17	6–12	7th			
1995–96	Patrick Knapp	12–15	7–11	6th (BE 7)			
1996–97	Patrick Knapp	17–11	9–9	1st (BE 7)			
1997–98	Patrick Knapp	9–19	5–13	6th (BE 7)			
1998–99	Patrick Knapp	18–12	10–8	5th	WNIT First Round		
1999–2000	Patrick Knapp	17–13	9–7	5th	WNIT First Round		
2000–01	Patrick Knapp	17–15	6–10	T-8th	WNIT Sixteen		
2001–02	Patrick Knapp	12–16	4–12	12th			
2002–03	Patrick Knapp	15–14	6–10	9th	WNIT First Round		
2003–04	Patrick Knapp	13–15	7–9	9th			
Patrick Knapp:		248–264	124–180				
Terri Williams-Flournoy (Big East) (2004–2012)
2004–05	Terry Williams-Flournoy	12–16	7–9	T-6th			
2005–06	Terry Williams-Flournoy	10–17	3–13	T-13th			
2006–07	Terry Williams-Flournoy	13–16	3–13	T-13th			
2007–08	Terry Williams-Flournoy	15–14	5–11	T-11th			
2008–09	Terry Williams-Flournoy	20–14	7–9	T-9th	WNIT Quarterfinals		
2009–10	Terry Williams-Flournoy	26–7	13–3	T-2nd	NCAA Second Round	17	13
2010–11	Terry Williams-Flournoy	24–11	9–7	T-7th	NCAA Sixteen	14	23
2011–12	Terry Williams-Flournoy	23–9	11–5	T-4th	NCAA Second Round	17	17
Terry Williams-Flournoy:		143–104	58–70				
Keith Brown (Big East) (2012–2013)
2012–13	Keith Brown	15–16	5–11	T-11th			
Keith Brown:		15–16	5–11				
Jim Lewis (Big East) (2013–2014)
2013–14	Jim Lewis	11–21	4–14	8th			
Jim Lewis:		11–21	4–14				
Natasha Adair (Big East) (2014–2017)
2014–15	Natasha Adair	4–27	2–16	10th			
2015–16	Natasha Adair	16–14	9–9	T-5th			
2016–17	Natasha Adair	17–13	9–9	6th			
Natasha Adair:		37–54	20–34				
James Howard (Big East) (2017–2023)
2017–18	James Howard	16–16	9–9	T-5th	WNIT Second round		
2018–19	James Howard	19–15	9–9	T–4th	WNIT Quarterfinals		
2019–20	James Howard	5–25	2–16	T–9th			
2020–21	James Howard	2–14	2–15	11th			
2021–22	James Howard	10–19	4–15	T–9th			
2022–23	James Howard	14–17	6–14	T–8th			
James Howard:		66–106	32–78				
Tasha Butts (Big East) (2023–2023)
2023–24	Tasha Butts	0–0*	0–0				
Tasha Butts:		0–0	0–0				
Darnell Haney (Big East) (2023–present)
2023–24	Darnell Haney	23–12	9–9	6th	WBIT Second Round		
2024–25	Darnell Haney	12–19	4–14	10th			
Darnell Haney:		35–34	13–23				
Total:		743–744 (.500)					
National champion Postseason invitational champion Conference regular season champion Conference regular season and conference tournament champion Division regular season champion Division regular season and conference tournament champion Conference tournament champion

*Butts was hired as head coach in March 2023, but died prior to the beginning of the 2023-24 season.

== NCAA tournament results ==
Year	Seed	Round	Opponent	Result
1993	#6	First Round; Second Round; Sweet Sixteen	#11 Northern Illinois #3 Penn State #2 Virginia	W 76-74; W 68-67; L 57-77
2010	#5	First Round; Second Round	#12 Marist #4 Baylor	W 62-42; L 33-49
2011	#5	First Round; Second Round; Sweet Sixteen	#12 Princeton #4 Maryland #1 Connecticut	W 65-49; W 79-57; L 63-68
2012	#5	First Round; Second Round	#12 Fresno State #4 Georgia Tech	W 61-56; L 64-76

== 2010 Paradise Jam ==
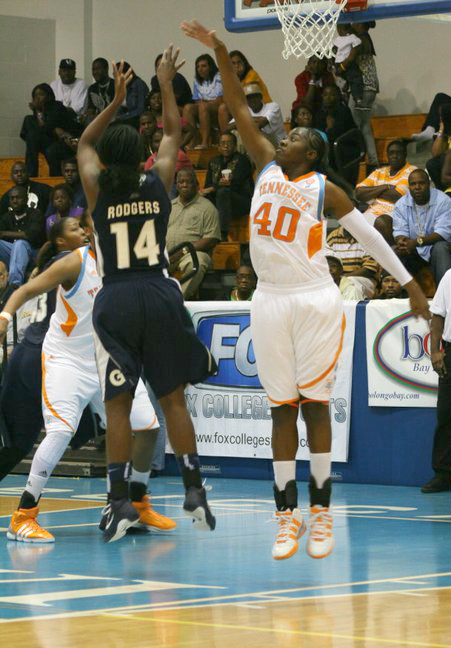
Georgetown's Sugar Rodgers shoots over Tennessee's Shekinna Stricklen at the 2010 Paradise Jam

Georgetown traveled to St. Thomas to participate in the Paradise Jam tournament held over the extended Thanksgiving weekend. On Thanksgiving, Georgetown beat Georgia Tech 67–58. The next day, 12th ranked (AP) Georgetown lost to unranked Missouri 54–45.

The final game matched up Georgetown, with a 1–1 record, against Tennessee, who were ranked 4th in the AP rankings, and had won their first two game in St. Thomas. Georgetown's Sugar Rogers, who has not played particularly well in the first two game of the tournament, had 28 points to help lead her team to an upset victory over Tennessee. The Hoyas opened up with an 11–4 run and never trailed. Tennessee out rebounded Georgetown 42–24, but committed 29 turnovers. Both teams shot about 40% from the field, but the Hoyas had an advantage beyond the arc, hitting 10 of their 18 three point attempts, while the Volunteers hit only three of 18 attempts. The two team ended with 2–1 records, but with the head-to-head tie breaker, Georgetown was awarded the Championship of the Paradise Jam, Island Division.

== Roster ==
2026–27 Georgetown Hoyas women's basketball team
Players
Coaches

Pos.	#	Name	Height	Year	Previous school	Hometown
G	0	Kendall Perry	5 ft 9 in (1.75 m)	Fr	Montverde Academy	Orlando, FL
G/F	2	Winner Bartholomew	6 ft 1 in (1.85 m)	Jr	Pacfic	Ajitata, Nigeria
G	3	Johnea Donahue	5 ft 7 in (1.7 m)	Jr	Bowling Green	Flint, MI
G	4	Destiny Agubata	5 ft 11 in (1.8 m)	RS Jr	West Virginia	Moreno Valley, CA
F	5	Stella Lockhart	6 ft 2 in (1.88 m)	Fr	St. John Vianney	Montclair, NJ
G	10	Amanda Ajobiewe	5 ft 9 in (1.75 m)	Jr	Ontario Christian	Riverside, CA
G	11	Khia Miller	5 ft 10 in (1.78 m)	Sr	East Carolina	Woodbridge, VA
G	13	J'Bionna Robinson	5 ft 7 in (1.7 m)	So	Northern Arizona	Springfield, OR
F	14	Clarence Djuela	6 ft 3 in (1.91 m)	Jr	Northwestern State	Berlin, Germany
G	16	Bo Frost	6 ft 2 in (1.88 m)	Fr	Oaklands College	Reykjavik, Iceland
F	24	Corrie McLaughlin	6 ft 2 in (1.88 m)	Sr	UNC Wilmington	Knightdale, NC
F	32	Brianna Byars	6 ft 0 in (1.83 m)	Sr	Cincinnati	Paris, KY

Head coach

- Darnell Haney (Florida A&M)

Assistant coach(es)

- Camille Collier (Wake Forest)
- Niki Washington (Southern Illinois)
- Eric Lindsey (Washington Adventist)

Legend

- (C) Team captain
- (S) Suspended
- (I) Ineligible
- (W) Walk-on
- Injured
- Current redshirt

Roster
Last update: September 6, 2026

== See also ==
- Georgetown Hoyas men's basketball
