= 2018–19 Bethune–Cookman Wildcats women's basketball team =

Women's college basketball season

2018–19 Bethune–Cookman Wildcats women's basketball

MEAC tournament champions

NCAA women's tournament, first round
- Conference: Mid-Eastern Athletic Conference
- Record: 21–11 (11–5 MEAC)
- Head coach: Vanessa Blair-Lewis (9th season)
- Assistant coaches: Chandler McCabe; Demetria Frank; Niki Washington
- Home arena: Moore Gymnasium

2018–19 MEAC women's basketball standings
	Conf.				Overall
Team	W		L	PCT	W		L	PCT
North Carolina A&T	16	–	0	1.000	20	–	12	.625
Maryland-Eastern Shore	12	–	4	.750	17	–	14	.548
Bethune–Cookman †	11	–	5	.688	21	–	11	.656
Howard	10	–	6	.625	18	–	13	.581
Norfolk State	10	–	6	.625	17	–	15	.531
South Carolina State	8	–	8	.500	16	–	16	.500
Morgan State	8	–	8	.500	10	–	21	.323
North Carolina Central	5	–	11	.313	9	–	22	.290
Savannah State	5	–	11	.313	7	–	19	.269
Delaware State	5	–	11	.313	7	–	21	.250
Coppin State	4	–	12	.250	5	–	25	.167
Florida A&M	2	–	14	.125	4	–	25	.138
† 2019 MEAC tournament winner As of March 17, 2019; Rankings from AP poll

The 2018–19 Bethune–Cookman Wildcats women's basketball team represented Bethune–Cookman University during the 2018–19 NCAA Division I women's basketball season. The Wildcats, led by ninth-year head coach Vanessa Blair-Lewis, played their home games at the Moore Gymnasium in Daytona Beach, Florida as members of the Mid-Eastern Athletic Conference (MEAC). They finished the season 21–11, 11–5 in MEAC play, to finish in third place. They won the MEAC women's tournament and earned their first automatic bid of the NCAA women's tournament in school history, where they lost to Notre Dame in the first round.

== Roster ==
2018–19 Bethune–Cookman Wildcats women's basketball team
Players
Coaches

Pos.	#	Name	Height	Year	Previous school	Hometown
G	1	Camary Harris	5 ft 6 in (1.68 m)	Fr	King's Fork	Suffolk, VA
F	2	Amaya Scott	6 ft 1 in (1.85 m)	So	Piper	Sunrise, FL
G	3	Kiana Williams	5 ft 6 in (1.68 m)	Fr	Long Reach	Columbia, MD
G	5	Armani Walker	5 ft 8 in (1.73 m)	Jr	Flagler Palm Coast	Bunnell, FL
G	10	Briana Hardee	5 ft 10 in (1.78 m)	RS Jr	Westlake; Sacred Heart	Waldorf, MD
G	11	Ashanti Hunt	5 ft 11 in (1.8 m)	Sr	Kipp DC College Preparatory	Washington, D.C.
F	12	Chasimmie Brown	6 ft 0 in (1.83 m)	Sr	Deltona	Deltona, FL
F	15	Amani Ball	5 ft 11 in (1.8 m)	So	National Christian Academy	Laurel, MD
G	21	Daniella Hatcher (redshirt)	5 ft 8 in (1.73 m)	Jr	Lake Nona; Richmond	Orlando, FL
G/F	22	Tania White	5 ft 10 in (1.78 m)	Fr	Largo	Suitland, MD
G	23	Kindell Fincher	5 ft 9 in (1.75 m)	RS Sr	Canterbury; Xavier	Fort Wayne, IN
G	24	Angel Golden	5 ft 8 in (1.73 m)	Sr	Alonso	Tampa, FL
C	25	Jayla Powers	6 ft 3 in (1.91 m)	Jr	Westminster	Finksburg, MD
F/C	33	Alyssa Jones	6 ft 1 in (1.85 m)	Fr	Alonso	Tampa, FL
F/C	35	Ashlie Howell (redshirt)	6 ft 1 in (1.85 m)	Fr	Christ the King; St. Peter's	Tampa, FL

Head coach

- Vanessa Blair-Lewis (Mount St. Mary's)

Assistant coach(es)

- Chandler McCabe (Providence)
- Demetria Frank (Bethune–Cookman)
- Niki Washington (Southern Illinois)

Legend

- (C) Team captain
- (S) Suspended
- (I) Ineligible
- (W) Walk-on
- Injured
- Current redshirt

Roster
Last update: November 6, 2024

== Schedule and results ==
Date time, TV	Rank^{#}	Opponent^{#}	Result	Record	Site (attendance) city, state
Non-conference regular season
November 7, 2018*; 6:30 p.m.		Edward Waters	W 73–46	1–0	Moore Gymnasium (904); Daytona Beach, FL
November 9, 2018*; 7:00 p.m.		Liberty	W 81–76 ^{OT}	2–0	Moore Gymnasium (317); Daytona Beach, FL
November 15, 2018*; 7:00 p.m.		at No. 21 South Florida	L 39–88	2–1	Yuengling Center (2,112); Tampa, FL
November 20, 2018*; 5:00 p.m.		FIU	W 68–57	3–1	Moore Gymnasium (407); Daytona Beach, FL
November 25, 2018*; 2:00 p.m.		at Georgia Southern	L 76–77	3–2	Hanner Fieldhouse (283); Statesboro, GA
November 28, 2018*; 7:00 p.m.		at Jacksonville	W 58–56	4–2	Swisher Gymnasium (508); Jacksonville, FL
December 5, 2018*; 7:00 p.m.		at Florida	L 53–64	4–3	O'Connell Center (1,129); Gainesville, FL
December 9, 2018*; 3:00 p.m.		Flagler College	W 74–59	5–3	Moore Gymnasium (318); Daytona Beach, FL
December 15, 2018*; 3:00 p.m.		North Florida	W 76–60	6–3	Moore Gymnasium (311); Daytona Beach, FL
December 20, 2018*; 3:00 p.m.		vs. Kennesaw State; GSU Holiday Classic	W 64–61	7–3	GSU Sports Arena (309); Atlanta, GA
December 21, 2018*; 3:00 p.m.		at Georgia State; GSU Holiday Classic	L 54–62	7–4	GSU Sports Arena (357); Atlanta, GA
December 28, 2018*; 7:00 p.m.		at Charlotte	L 69–73	7–5	Dale F. Halton Arena (812); Charlotte, NC
MEAC regular season
January 5, 2019; 2:00 p.m.		at North Carolina Central	W 67–50	8–5 (1–0)	McDougald–McLendon Arena (643); Durham, NC
January 12, 2019; 2:00 p.m.		at Howard	L 40–62	8–6 (1–1)	Burr Gymnasium (436); Washington, D.C.
January 14, 2019; 5:30 p.m.		at Norfolk State	L 50–57	8–7 (1–2)	Joseph G. Echols Memorial Hall (788); Norfolk, VA
January 19, 2019; 2:00 p.m.		Delaware State	W 67–55	9–7 (2–2)	Moore Gymnasium (497); Daytona Beach, FL
January 21, 2019; 2:00 p.m.		Maryland Eastern Shore	L 52–64	9–8 (2–3)	Moore Gymnasium (297); Daytona Beach, FL
January 26, 2019; 1:00 p.m.		at Morgan State	W 73–69 ^{OT}	10–8 (3–3)	Talmadge L. Hill Field House (809); Baltimore, MD
January 28, 2019; 5:30 p.m.		at Coppin State	W 71–65	11–8 (4–3)	Physical Education Complex (317); Baltimore, MD
February 2, 2019; 2:00 p.m.		North Carolina Central	W 72–54	12–8 (5–3)	Moore Gymnasium (391); Daytona Beach, FL
February 4, 2019; 5:30 p.m.		North Carolina A&T	L 48–72	12–9 (5–4)	Moore Gymnasium (299); Daytona Beach, FL
February 9, 2019; 2:00 p.m.		Norfolk State	W 65–58	13–9 (6–4)	Moore Gymnasium (407); Daytona Beach, FL
February 11, 2019; 5:30 p.m.		Howard	W 76–63	14–9 (7–4)	Moore Gymnasium (688); Daytona Beach, FL
February 16, 2019; 2:00 p.m.		at South Carolina State	W 69–64	15–9 (8–4)	SHM Memorial Center (245); Orangeburg, SC
February 18, 2019; 5:30 p.m.		at Savannah State	W 68–47	16–9 (9–4)	Tiger Arena (309); Savannah, GA
February 23, 2019; 2:00 p.m.		at Florida A&M	W 52–50	17–9 (10–4)	Teaching Gym (2,345); Tallahassee, FL
March 2, 2019; 2:00 p.m.		South Carolina State	L 51–57	17–10 (10–5)	Moore Gymnasium (417); Daytona Beach, FL
March 7, 2019; 5:30 p.m.		Florida A&M	W 70–60	18–10 (11–5)	Moore Gymnasium; Daytona Beach, FL
MEAC women's tournament
November 14, 2019; 2:00 p.m.	(3)	vs. (11) Coppin State; Quarterfinals	W 55–49	19–10	Norfolk Scope; Norfolk, VA
March 15, 2019; 2:00 p.m.	(3)	vs. (2) Maryland Eastern Shore; Semifinals	W 58–47	20–10	Norfolk Scope; Norfolk, VA
March 16, 2019; 4:00 p.m., ESPN3	(3)	vs. (4) Norfolk State; Championship game	W 57–43	21–10	Norfolk Scope; Norfolk, VA
NCAA women's tournament
March 23, 2019*; 11:00 a.m., ESPN2	(16 C)	at (1 C) No. 3 Notre Dame; First round	L 50–92	21–11	Edmund P. Joyce Center (7,885); South Bend, IN
*Non-conference game. ^{#}Rankings from AP poll. (#) Tournament seedings in parentheses. C=Chicago Region. All times are in Eastern.

== See also ==
- 2018–19 Bethune–Cookman Wildcats men's basketball team
