= 2018–19 Florida A&M Lady Rattlers basketball team =

Women's college basketball season

2018–19 Florida A&M Lady Rattlers basketball
- Conference: Mid-Eastern Athletic Conference
- Record: 4–25 (2–14 MEAC)
- Head coach: Kevin Lynum
- Assistant coach: Angelica Bermudez
- Home arena: Alfred Lawson Jr. Multipurpose Center (Capacity: 9,639)

2018–19 MEAC women's basketball standings
	Conf.				Overall
Team	W		L	PCT	W		L	PCT
North Carolina A&T	16	–	0	1.000	20	–	12	.625
Maryland-Eastern Shore	12	–	4	.750	17	–	14	.548
Bethune–Cookman †	11	–	5	.688	21	–	11	.656
Howard	10	–	6	.625	18	–	13	.581
Norfolk State	10	–	6	.625	17	–	15	.531
South Carolina State	8	–	8	.500	16	–	16	.500
Morgan State	8	–	8	.500	10	–	21	.323
North Carolina Central	5	–	11	.313	9	–	22	.290
Savannah State	5	–	11	.313	7	–	19	.269
Delaware State	5	–	11	.313	7	–	21	.250
Coppin State	4	–	12	.250	5	–	25	.167
Florida A&M	2	–	14	.125	4	–	25	.138
† 2019 MEAC tournament winner As of March 17, 2019; Rankings from AP poll

The 2018–19 Florida A&M Lady Rattlers basketball team represented Florida A&M University during the 2018–19 NCAA Division I women's basketball season. The Rattlers were led by ninth-year head coach LeDawn Gibson, until she was fired on February 12, 2019. Assistant coach Kevin Lynum took over as interim head coach for the remainder of the season. The Lady Rattlers, members of the Mid-Eastern Athletic Conference (MEAC), played their home games at the Alfred Lawson Jr. Multipurpose Center in Tallahassee, Florida. They finished the season 4–25, 2–14 in MEAC play, to finish in last place. They lost in the first round of the MEAC women's tournament to Howard.

== Roster ==
2018–19 Florida A&M Rattlers women's basketball team
Players
Coaches

Pos.	#	Name	Height	Year	Previous school	Hometown
G	1	Mya Moye	5 ft 6 in (1.68 m)	Fr	Anacostia	Washington, D.C.
G	2	Autumn Goram	5 ft 5 in (1.65 m)	Fr	Pensacola	Pensacola, FL
G	3	Candice Williams	5 ft 6 in (1.68 m)	RS Sr	St. Francis; South Alabama	Atlanta, GA
G	4	Deja Antoine	5 ft 9 in (1.75 m)	Fr	Cardinal Gibbons	Tamarac, FL
G	11	Morgan Mitchell	5 ft 2 in (1.57 m)	So	Riverdale Baptist; Frederick CC	Upper Marlboro, MD
G	12	Keziah Dilworth	6 ft 0 in (1.83 m)	Fr	Temple	Temple, TX
G/F	14	Tyra James	5 ft 11 in (1.8 m)	RS Sr	Winton Woods; Kent State	Cincinnati, OH
F	14	Dy'Manee Royal	6 ft 1 in (1.85 m)	Jr	Beach	Savannah, GA
C	20	Chiqueria Cook	6 ft 3 in (1.91 m)	Jr	Tucker	Atlanta, GA
F	21	Jhakya Dilworth	6 ft 0 in (1.83 m)	Fr	Temple	Temple, TX
G/F	23	Taylor Darks	5 ft 10 in (1.78 m)	RS Jr	Walnut Hills	Cincinnati, OH
G/F	30	Jasmine Ballew	5 ft 11 in (1.8 m)	Fr	Princeton	Cincinnati, OH
F	32	Shawnice Gresham	5 ft 11 in (1.8 m)	Jr	Herndon; Harcum College	Herndon, VA
C	40	Shalaunda Burney Robinson	6 ft 0 in (1.83 m)	RS Sr	Pete Knight	Palmdale, CA

Head coach

- LeDawn Gibson (Florida A&M)
- Kevin Lynum (Warner)

Assistant coach(es)

- Andrea Johnson (LeMoyne–Owen)

Legend

- (C) Team captain
- (S) Suspended
- (I) Ineligible
- (W) Walk-on
- Injured
- Current redshirt

Roster
Last update: July 22, 2024

== Schedule and results ==
Date time, TV	Rank^{#}	Opponent^{#}	Result	Record	Site (attendance) city, state
Non-conference regular season
November 6, 2019*; 5:00 p.m.		Jacksonville State	L 31–62	0–1	Teaching Gym; Tallahassee, FL
November 16, 2019*; 7:00 p.m., ESPN+		at North Florida	L 53–64	0–2	UNF Arena (473); Jacksonville, FL
November 18, 2019*; 2:00 p.m.		at No. 12 Tennessee	L 31–96	0–3	Thompson–Boling Arena (7,616); Knoxville, TN
November 23, 2019*; 12:00 p.m.		at FIU; FIU Thanksgiving Tournament semifinals	L 54–77	0–4	Ocean Bank Convocation Center; Miami, FL
November 25, 2019*; 12:00 p.m.		vs. Omaha; FIU Thanksgiving Tournament 3rd-place game	L 50–57	0–5	Ocean Bank Convocation Center; Miami, FL
December 1, 2019*; 2:00 p.m.		Edward Waters	W 70–64	1–5	Teaching Gym (462); Tallahassee, FL
December 9, 2019*; 2:00 p.m.		at Florida	L 38–62	1–6	O'Connell Center (1,309); Gainesville, FL
December 16, 2019*; 2:00 p.m.		Miami (OH)	W 57–56	2–6	Teaching Gym (350); Tallahassee, FL
December 20, 2019*; 1:00 p.m., ESPN+		at Stetson; Hatter Classic	L 44–69	2–7	Edmunds Center; DeLand, FL
December 21, 2019*; 3:00 p.m.		vs. Western Michigan; Hatter Classic	L 50–69	2–8	Edmunds Center (75); DeLand, FL
December 28, 2019*; 7:00 p.m., ACCNE		at Miami (FL); Miami Holiday Classic	L 74–103	2–9	Watsco Center (979); Coral Gables, FL
December 30, 2019*; 3:00 p.m.		vs. Tulane; Miami Holiday Classic	L 34–78	2–10	Watsco Center (169); Coral Gables, FL
MEAC regular season
January 5, 2019; 2:00 p.m.		at Howard	L 68–74	2–11 (0–1)	Burr Gymnasium (876); Washington, D.C.
January 7, 2019; 5:30 p.m.		at Norfolk State	L 58–60	2–12 (0–2)	Joseph G. Echols Memorial Hall (425); Norfolk, VA
January 12, 2019; 2:00 p.m.		Savannah State	L 50–54	2–13 (0–3)	Teaching Gym (784); Tallahassee, FL
January 19, 2019; 2:00 p.m.		Maryland Eastern Shore	L 36–68	2–14 (0–4)	Teaching Gym (1,040); Tallahassee, FL
January 21, 2019; 2:00 p.m.		Delaware State	W 57–52	3–14 (1–4)	Teaching Gym (770); Tallahassee, FL
January 26, 2019; 2:00 p.m.		at Coppin State	L 53–73	3–15 (1–5)	Physical Education Complex (200); Baltimore, MD
January 28, 2019; 5:30 p.m.		at Morgan State	L 71–75 ^{OT}	3–16 (1–6)	Talmadge L. Hill Field House (702); Baltimore, MD
February 2, 2019; 2:00 p.m.		North Carolina A&T	L 48–56	3–17 (1–7)	Teaching Gym (789); Tallahassee, FL
February 4, 2019; 4:00 p.m.		North Carolina Central	L 57–64	3–18 (1–8)	Teaching Gym (567); Tallahassee, FL
February 9, 2019; 2:00 p.m.		Howard	L 59–81	3–20 (1–9)	Teaching Gym (679); Tallahassee, FL
February 11, 2019; 4:00 p.m.		Norfolk State	L 45–69	3–21 (1–10)	Teaching Gym (565); Tallahassee, FL
February 16, 2019; 4:00 p.m.		at Savannah State	W 60–55	4–21 (2–10)	Tiger Arena (1,355); Savannah, GA
February 18, 2019; 5:30 p.m.		at South Carolina State	L 48–61	4–22 (2–11)	SHM Memorial Center; Orangeburg, SC
February 23, 2019; 2:00 p.m.		Bethune–Cookman	L 50–52	4–23 (2–12)	Teaching Gym (2,345); Tallahassee, FL
March 2, 2019; 2:00 p.m.		at North Carolina A&T	L 53–77	4–23 (2–13)	Corbett Sports Center (543); Greensboro, NC
March 7, 2019; 5:30 p.m.		at Bethune–Cookman	L 60–70	4–24 (2–14)	Moore Gymnasium; Daytona Beach, FL
MEAC women's tournament
March 11, 2019; 1:00 p.m.	(12)	vs. (5) Howard; First round	L 53–59	4–25	Norfolk Scope; Norfolk, VA
*Non-conference game. ^{#}Rankings from AP poll. (#) Tournament seedings in parentheses. All times are in Eastern.

== See also ==
- 2018–19 Florida A&M Rattlers basketball team
