= 2018–19 Stetson Hatters women's basketball team =

Intercollegiate basketball season

2018–19 Stetson Hatters women's basketball
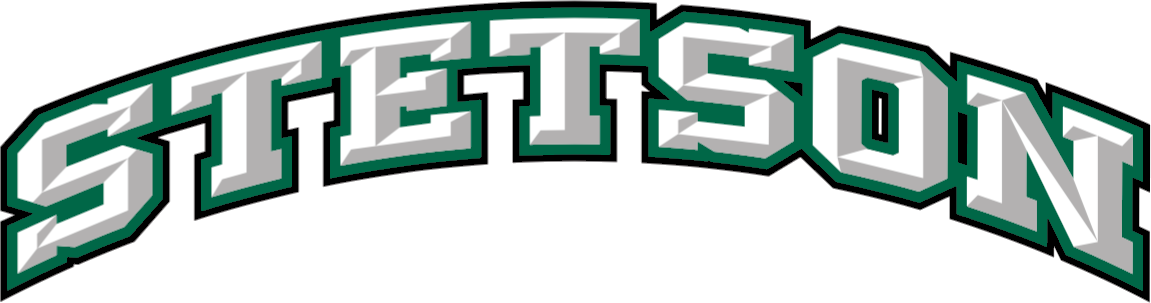

Hatter Classic Champions

WNIT, First Round
- Conference: Atlantic Sun Conference
- Record: 16–16 (11–5 ASUN)
- Head coach: Lynn Bria (11th season)
- Assistant coaches: Tron Griffin; Otavio Battaglia; Shanasa Sanders
- Home arena: Edmunds Center

2018–19 ASUN women's basketball standings
	Conf.				Overall
Team	W		L	PCT	W		L	PCT
Florida Gulf Coast †	16	–	0	1.000	28	–	5	.848
Stetson	11	–	5	.688	16	–	16	.500
North Alabama	10	–	6	.625	21	–	9	.700
Liberty	10	–	6	.625	16	–	16	.500
North Florida	9	–	7	.563	15	–	14	.517
Jacksonville	7	–	9	.438	14	–	16	.467
Kennesaw State	4	–	12	.250	9	–	22	.290
NJIT	3	–	13	.188	6	–	24	.200
Lipscomb	2	–	14	.125	4	–	25	.138
† 2019 ASUN Tournament winner Rankings from AP poll

The 2018–19 Stetson Hatters women's basketball team represented Stetson University in the 2018–19 NCAA Division I women's basketball season. The Hatters, led by eleventh year head coach Lynn Bria, played their home games at Edmunds Center and were members of the Atlantic Sun Conference. They finished the season 16–16, 11–5 in A-Sun play to finish in second place. They lost in the quarterfinals of the A-Sun women's tournament to Kennesaw State. They were automatic bid to the WNIT, where they lost to South Florida in the first round.

== Media ==
All home games and conference road are shown on ESPN3 or A-Sun.TV. Non conference road games are typically available on the opponents website. Audio broadcasts of Hatters games can be found on WSBB AM 1230/1490 with Ryan Rouse on the call.

== Roster ==
2018–19 Stetson Hatters women's basketball team
Players
Coaches

Pos.	#	Name	Height	Year	Previous school	Hometown
F	00	Day'Neshia Banks	5 ft 10 in (1.78 m)	Fr	Ribault HS; Ole Miss	Jacksonville, FL
F	1	Sarah Sagerer	6 ft 3 in (1.91 m)	RS Sr	The Rock School	Vöcklabruck, Austria
G	2	McKenna Beach	5 ft 6 in (1.68 m)	Sr	Cape Coral HS	Cape Coral, FL
G	3	Bianca Fizouaty	5 ft 9 in (1.75 m)	Fr	Grayson HS	Lawrenceville, GA
G	11	Addi Walters	5 ft 9 in (1.75 m)	RS Jr	St. Ignatius Prep; Cal State Bakersfield	San Francisco, CA
G	14	Jon'Nita Henry	5 ft 6 in (1.68 m)	Jr	Bibb County HS; Snead State CC	Brent, AL
G	21	Mackenzie Davis	5 ft 7 in (1.7 m)	Fr	Reynoldsburg eSTEM Academy	Reynoldsburg, OH
F	23	Megan Vincent	6 ft 4 in (1.93 m)	So	Keller HS	Keller, TX
G	34	Rosalee Nicholson	5 ft 6 in (1.68 m)	Fr	New London HS	New London, CT
F	35	Kendall Lentz	5 ft 11 in (1.8 m)	Fr	John Paul II	Garland, TX

Head coach

- Lynn Bria (Charleston (WV))

Assistant coach(es)

- Tron Griffin (Bethune–Cookman)
- Otavio Battaglia (São Paulo)
- Shanasa Sanders (Stetson)

Legend

- (C) Team captain
- (S) Suspended
- (I) Ineligible
- (W) Walk-on
- Injured
- Current redshirt

Roster

== Schedule ==
Date time, TV	Rank^{#}	Opponent^{#}	Result	Record	Site (attendance) city, state
Non-conference regular season
Nov 6, 2018*; 1:00 pm		at Tulsa	L 54–55	0–1	Reynolds Center (987); Tulsa, OK
Nov 14, 2018*; 7:00 pm, ESPN+		UCF	L 55–78	0–2	Edmunds Center (482); DeLand, FL
Nov 23, 2018*; 1:00 pm		vs. Marist; Challenge in Music City	L 69–78	0–3	Nashville Municipal Auditorium (150); Nashville, TN
Nov 24, 2018*; 1:00 pm		vs. Wright State; Challenge in Music City	L 44–57	0–4	Nashville Municipal Auditorium; Nashville, TN
Nov 25, 2018*; 1:00 pm		vs. Hofstra; Challenge in Music City	L 50–53	0–5	Nashville Municipal Auditorium (750); Nashville, TN
Nov 27, 2018*; 7:00 pm		at Alabama	L 47–59	0–6	Coleman Coliseum (1,919); Tuscaloosa, AL
Nov 30, 2018*; 11:00 am, ESPN+		Webber International	W 80–52	1–6	Edmunds Center (535); DeLand, FL
Dec 5, 2018*; 7:00 pm		at No. 9 Tennessee	L 55–65	1–7	Thompson–Boling Arena (6,916); Knoxville, TN
Dec 16, 2018*; 2:00 pm, LHN		at No. 12 Texas	L 46–65	1–8	Frank Erwin Center (3,088); Austin, TX
Dec 19, 2018*; 1:00 pm, ESPN+		North Dakota; Hatter Classic	W 74–63	2–8	Edmunds Center (304); DeLand, FL
Dec 20, 2018*; 1:00 pm, ESPN+		Florida A&M; Hatter Classic	W 69–44	3–8	Edmunds Center; DeLand, FL
Dec 21, 2018*; 11:00 am, ESPN+		North Dakota State; Hatter Classic	W 60–59	4–8	Edmunds Center (306); DeLand, FL
Dec 31, 2018*; 11:00 am, ESPN+		Penn	L 53–75	4–9	Edmunds Center (263); DeLand, FL
Jan 4, 2019*; 7:00 pm, ESPN+		Central State	W 81–51	5–9	Edmunds Center (303); DeLand, FL
Atlantic Sun regular season
Jan 8, 2019; 7:00 pm, ESPN+		Liberty	W 69–52	6–9 (1–0)	Edmunds Center (319); DeLand, FL
Jan 12, 2019; 2:30 pm, ESPN+		at Lipscomb	W 80–65	7–9 (2–0)	Allen Arena; Nashville, TN
Jan 15, 2019; 7:00 pm, ESPN+		at North Florida	L 57–71	7–10 (2–1)	UNF Arena (308); Jacksonville, FL
Jan 19, 2019; 2:00 pm, ESPN+		at North Alabama	L 55–71	7–11 (2–2)	Flowers Hall (1,076); Florence, AL
Jan 22, 2019; 7:00 pm, ESPN+		NJIT	W 74–48	8–11 (3–2)	Edmunds Center (401); DeLand, FL
Jan 26, 2019; 1:00 pm, ESPN+		Lipscomb	W 76–49	9–11 (4–2)	Edmunds Center (386); DeLand, FL
Jan 29, 2019; 7:00 pm, ESPN+		at Jacksonville	W 69–56	10–11 (5–2)	Swisher Gymnasium (117); Jacksonville, FL
Feb 2, 2019; 1:00 pm, ESPN+		Kennesaw State	W 76–69	11–11 (6–2)	Edmunds Center (313); Stetson, FL
Feb 5, 2019; 11:00 am, ESPN+		at Liberty	W 68–56	12–11 (7–2)	Vines Center (319); Lynchburg, VA
Feb 12, 2019; 7:00 pm, ESPN+		Jacksonville	W 54–46	13–11 (8–2)	Edmunds Center (384); DeLand, FL
Feb 16, 2019; 1:00 pm, ESPN+		Florida Gulf Coast	L 40–73	13–12 (8–3)	Edmunds Center (475); DeLand, FL
Feb 19, 2019; 7:00 pm, ESPN+		at NJIT	W 56–47	14–12 (9–3)	Wellness and Events Center (201); Newark, NJ
Feb 23, 2019; 1:00 pm, ESPN+		North Alabama	W 69–59	15–12 (10–3)	Edmunds Center (1,076); DeLand, FL
Feb 27, 2019; 7:00 pm, ESPN+		North Florida	L 62–75	15–13 (10–4)	Edmunds Center (177); DeLand, FL
Mar 2, 2019; 1:00 pm, ESPN+		at Kennesaw State	W 58–45	16–13 (11–4)	KSU Convocation Center (545); Kennesaw, GA
Mar 5, 2019; 7:00 pm, ESPN+		at Florida Gulf Coast	L 42–61	16–14 (11–5)	Alico Arena (2,751); Fort Myers, FL
Atlantic Sun Tournament
Mar 8, 2019; 7:00 pm, ESPN+	(2)	(7) Kennesaw State; Quarterfinals	L 59–67	16–15	Edmunds Center (286); DeLand, FL
WNIT
Mar 21, 2019*; 7:00 pm		at South Florida; First Round	L 50–84	16–16	Yuengling Center (1,357); Tampa, FL
*Non-conference game. ^{#}Rankings from AP Poll. (#) Tournament seedings in parentheses. All times are in Eastern Time.

== Rankings ==
2018–19 NCAA Division I women's basketball rankings

+ Regular season polls	Poll	Pre- Season	Week 2	Week 3	Week 4	Week 5	Week 6	Week 7	Week 8	Week 9	Week 10	Week 11	Week 12	Week 13	Week 14	Week 15	Week 16	Week 17	Week 18	Week 19	Final
AP																				N/A	
Coaches																					

Legend
	Increase in ranking
	Decrease in ranking
	No change
(RV)	Received votes
(NR)	Not ranked

== See also ==
- 2018–19 Stetson Hatters men's basketball team
