= 2018–19 Florida Gulf Coast Eagles women's basketball team =

Intercollegiate basketball season

2018–19 Florida Gulf Coast Eagles women's basketball
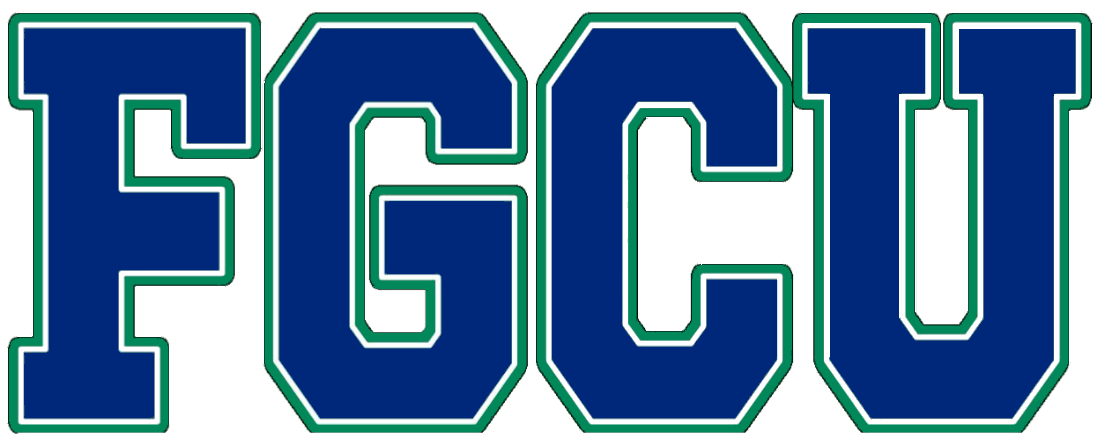

Atlantic Sun regular season and tournament champions

NCAA tournament, first round
- Conference: Atlantic Sun Conference
- Record: 28–5 (16–0 A-Sun)
- Head coach: Karl Smesko (17th season)
- Assistant coaches: Chelsea Banbury; Chelsea Lyles; Jenna Cobb
- Home arena: Alico Arena

2018–19 ASUN women's basketball standings
	Conf.				Overall
Team	W		L	PCT	W		L	PCT
Florida Gulf Coast †	16	–	0	1.000	28	–	5	.848
Stetson	11	–	5	.688	16	–	16	.500
North Alabama	10	–	6	.625	21	–	9	.700
Liberty	10	–	6	.625	16	–	16	.500
North Florida	9	–	7	.563	15	–	14	.517
Jacksonville	7	–	9	.438	14	–	16	.467
Kennesaw State	4	–	12	.250	9	–	22	.290
NJIT	3	–	13	.188	6	–	24	.200
Lipscomb	2	–	14	.125	4	–	25	.138
† 2019 ASUN Tournament winner Rankings from AP poll

The 2018–19 Florida Gulf Coast Eagles women's basketball team represented Florida Gulf Coast University during the 2018–19 NCAA Division I women's basketball season. The Eagles, led by seventeenth year head coach Karl Smesko, played their home games at the Alico Arena and were members of the Atlantic Sun Conference. They finished the season 28–4, 16–0 in A-Sun play to win the Atlantic Sun regular season. Florida Gulf Coast won the conference tournament championship game over Liberty, 72–49. They lost in the first round to Miami (FL).

== Media ==
All home games and conference road are shown on ESPN+ or A-Sun.TV. Road games are also broadcast on the FGCU Portal.

== Roster ==
2018–19 Florida Gulf Coast Eagles women's basketball team
Players
Coaches

Pos.	#	Name	Height	Year	Previous school	Hometown
G	00	Davion Wingate	5 ft 6 in (1.68 m)	RS Jr	Stephenson; Stony Brook	Atlanta, GA
G/F	1	Erna Normil	5 ft 10 in (1.78 m)	Jr	Lake Worth; Florida Southwestern	Lake Worth, FL
G	2	Alyssa Blair	5 ft 11 in (1.8 m)	So	Sun Prairie	Sun Prairie, WI
G	3	Keri Jewett-Giles	5 ft 6 in (1.68 m)	RS Jr	Dunbar; Southern Miss	Fort Myers, FL
G	4	Chandler Ryan	5 ft 7 in (1.7 m)	RS So	Morton	Groveland, IL
G	5	Lisa Zderadicka	5 ft 6 in (1.68 m)	RS Sr	HAK Korneuburg; Houston Baptist	Vienna, Austria
G	10	Sheahen Dowling	5 ft 7 in (1.7 m)	So	Trinity	Chicago, IL
G	13	Kerstie Phills	5 ft 9 in (1.75 m)	RS So	Charlotte Christian; Wagner	Charlotte, NC
G	14	Brittany Johnson	5 ft 11 in (1.8 m)	RS Sr	Pickerington North; Quinnipiac	Pickerington, OH
G	15	Tyra Cox	5 ft 8 in (1.73 m)	RS Fr	Lake Highland Prep; William & Mary	Orlando, FL
G/F	20	Tanner Bryant	5 ft 11 in (1.8 m)	Fr	Miami Trace	Washington Court House, OH
G/F	22	Destiny Washington	5 ft 10 in (1.78 m)	RS Sr	Lawrence North	Indianapolis, IN
G	23	Ashley Panem	5 ft 9 in (1.75 m)	Fr	Fairview	Broomfield, CO
G/F	31	Nasrin Ulel	5 ft 9 in (1.75 m)	Jr	Murrieta	Murrieta, CA
F	42	Tytionia Adderly	5 ft 10 in (1.78 m)	Jr	Cardinal Newman	Jupiter, FL
G		Emma List (redshirt)	5 ft 10 in (1.78 m)	So	Discovery Canyon Campus; Albany	Colorado Springs, CO
G		Anja Marinkovic (redshirt)	5 ft 8 in (1.73 m)	Jr	Northern Secondary; Detroit Mercy	Toronto, Ontario

Head coach

- Karl Smesko (Kent State)

Assistant coach(es)

- Chelsea Banbury (Florida Gulf Coast)
- Chelsea Lyles (Florida Gulf Coast)
- Jenna Cobb (Florida Gulf Coast)

Legend

- (C) Team captain
- (S) Suspended
- (I) Ineligible
- (W) Walk-on
- Injured
- Current redshirt

Roster
Last update: January 31, 2019

== Schedule ==
Date time, TV	Rank^{#}	Opponent^{#}	Result	Record	Site (attendance) city, state
Non-conference regular season
November 9, 2018*; 8:00 pm, ESPN3		at South Dakota State	L 62–80	0–1	Frost Arena (1,678); Brookings, SD
November 12, 2018*; 7:00 pm, ESPN+		Florida Memorial	W 99–68	1–1	Alico Arena (2,003); Fort Myers, FL
November 16, 2018*; 5:00 pm, Facebook Live		FIU	W 100–58	2–1	Alico Arena (1,869); Fort Myers, FL
November 23, 2018*; 9:30 pm		vs. No. 8 Stanford; Rainbow Wahine Shootout	L 65–88	2–2	Stan Sheriff Center; Honolulu, HI
November 24, 2018*; 7:30 pm, Big West Network		at Hawaii; Rainbow Wahine Shootout	W 73–67	3–2	Stan Sheriff Center (1,268); Honolulu, HI
November 25, 2018*; 5:00 pm		vs. American; Rainbow Wahine Shootout	W 90–71	4–2	Stan Sheriff Center; Honolulu, HI
November 28, 2018*; 5:00 pm, ESPN+		Houston	W 76–71	5–2	Alico Arena (2,021); Fort Myers, FL
December 5, 2018*; 7:00 pm		at Saint Francis (PA)	W 83–69	6–2	DeGol Arena (471); Loretto, PA
December 14, 2018*; 7:00 pm, ESPN+		Johnson & Wales (FL)	W 109–64	7–2	Alico Arena (1,761); Fort Myers, FL
December 17, 2018*; 7:00 pm, ESPN+		Abilene Christian	W 81–65	8–2	Alico Arena (1,758); Fort Myers, FL
December 19, 2018*; 5:00 pm, ESPN+		Coppin State; Hilton Garden Inn FGCU Classic	W 93–61	9–2	Alico Arena (1,728); Fort Myers, FL
December 21, 2018*; 7:00 pm, ESPN+		UAB; Hilton Garden Inn FGCU Classic	L 60–62	9–3	Alico Arena (1,721); Fort Myers, FL
December 30, 2018*; 2:00 pm, ACCNE		at Duke	L 41–57	9–4	Cameron Indoor Stadium (3,310); Durham, NC
Atlantic Sun Conference regular season
January 5, 2019; 4:00 pm, ESPN+		Liberty	W 68–50	10–4 (1–0)	Alico Arena (2,225); Fort Myers, FL
January 8, 2019; 7:00 pm, ESPN+		at North Alabama	W 68–52	11–4 (2–0)	Flowers Hall (744); Florence, AL
January 12, 2019; 1:00 pm, ESPN+		at North Florida	W 105–66	12–4 (3–0)	UNF Arena (423); Jacksonville, FL
January 19, 2019; 2:00 pm, ESPN+		at Kennesaw State	W 69–46	13–4 (4–0)	KSU Convocation Center; Kennesaw, GA
January 22, 2019; 7:00 pm, ESPN+		Lipscomb	W 82–40	14–4 (5–0)	Alico Arena (2,133); Fort Myers, FL
January 27, 2019; 2:00 pm, ESPN+		North Florida	W 80–48	15–4 (6–0)	Alico Arena (2,203); Fort Myers, FL
January 29, 2019; 7:00 pm, ESPN+		at NJIT	W 67–35	16–4 (7–0)	Wellness and Events Center (200); Newark, NJ
February 2, 2019; 4:00 pm, ESPN+		Jacksonville	W 82–58	17–4 (8–0)	Alico Arena (2,523); Fort Myers, FL
February 5, 2019; 7:00 pm, ESPN+		North Alabama	W 76–51	18–4 (9–0)	Alico Arena (2,208); Fort Myers, FL
February 9, 2019; 12:00 pm, ESPN+		at Liberty	W 65–64	19–4 (10–0)	Vines Center (1,410); Lynchburg, VA
February 12, 2019; 7:00 pm, ESPN+		NJIT	W 61–42	20–4 (11–0)	Alico Arena (2,481); Fort Myers, FL
February 16, 2019; 1:00 pm, ESPN+		at Stetson	W 73–40	21–4 (12–0)	Edmunds Center (475); DeLand, FL
February 19, 2019; 7:30 pm, Facebook Live		at Lipscomb	W 80–46	22–4 (13–0)	Allen Arena (135); Nashville, TN
February 23, 2019; 4:00 pm, ESPN+		Kennesaw State	W 79–48	23–4 (14–0)	Alico Arena (2,522); Fort Myers, FL
March 2, 2019; 1:00 pm, ESPN+		at Jacksonville	W 68–62	24–4 (15–0)	Swisher Gymnasium (513); Jacksonville, FL
March 5, 2019; 7:00 pm, ESPN+		Stetson	W 61–42	25–4 (16–0)	Alico Arena (2,751); Fort Myers, FL
Atlantic Sun Tournament
March 8, 2019; 7:00 pm, ESPN+	(1)	(8) NJIT; Quarterfinals	W 58–45	26–4	Alico Arena (1,542); Fort Myers, FL
March 13, 2019; 7:00 pm, ESPN+	(1)	(7) Kennesaw State; Semifinals	W 77–48	27–4	Alico Arena (1,822); Fort Myers, FL
March 17, 2019; 3:00 pm, ESPN+	(1)	(3) Liberty; Championship Game	W 72–49	28–4	Alico Arena (2,557); Fort Myers, FL
NCAA Women's Tournament
March 22, 2019*; 9:30 pm, ESPN2	(13 P)	at (4 P) No. 19 Miami (FL); First Round	L 62–69	28–5	Watsco Center (3,003); Coral Gables, FL
*Non-conference game. ^{#}Rankings from AP Poll. (#) Tournament seedings in parentheses. P=Portland. All times are in Eastern.

== Rankings ==
2018–19 NCAA Division I women's basketball rankings

Regular season polls
Poll	Pre- Season	Week 2	Week 3	Week 4	Week 5	Week 6	Week 7	Week 8	Week 9	Week 10	Week 11	Week 12	Week 13	Week 14	Week 15	Week 16	Week 17	Week 18	Week 19	Final
AP																RV	RV	RV	RV	N/A
Coaches	RV	RV																		

Legend
	Increase in ranking
	Decrease in ranking
	Not ranked previous week
(RV)	Received Votes
(NR)	Not Ranked

Coaches did not release a Week 2 poll and AP does not release a final poll.

== See also ==
- 2018–19 Florida Gulf Coast Eagles men's basketball team
