= 2018–19 NJIT Highlanders women's basketball team =

Intercollegiate basketball season

2018–19 NJIT Highlanders women's basketball
- Conference: Atlantic Sun Conference
- Record: 6–24 (3–13 Atlantic Sun)
- Head coach: Mike Lane (1st season)
- Assistant coaches: LaTonya Watson; Aaron Gratch; Sara Mitchell
- Home arena: Wellness and Events Center

2018–19 ASUN women's basketball standings
	Conf.				Overall
Team	W		L	PCT	W		L	PCT
Florida Gulf Coast †	16	–	0	1.000	28	–	5	.848
Stetson	11	–	5	.688	16	–	16	.500
North Alabama	10	–	6	.625	21	–	9	.700
Liberty	10	–	6	.625	16	–	16	.500
North Florida	9	–	7	.563	15	–	14	.517
Jacksonville	7	–	9	.438	14	–	16	.467
Kennesaw State	4	–	12	.250	9	–	22	.290
NJIT	3	–	13	.188	6	–	24	.200
Lipscomb	2	–	14	.125	4	–	25	.138
† 2019 ASUN Tournament winner Rankings from AP poll

The 2018–19 NJIT Highlanders women's basketball team represented New Jersey Institute of Technology during the 2018–19 NCAA Division I women's basketball season. The Highlanders, led by first year head coach Mike Lane, played their home games at the Wellness and Events Center and were fourth year members of the Atlantic Sun Conference. They finished the season 6–24, 3–13 in A-Sun play to finish in eighth place. They lost in the quarterfinals of A-Sun Tournament to Florida Gulf Coast.

== Roster ==
2018–19 NJIT Highlanders women's basketball team
Players
Coaches

Pos.	#	Name	Height	Year	Previous school	Hometown
G	0	Amber Morgan	5 ft 5 in (1.65 m)	Jr	Lawrence North	Indianapolis, IN
G	5	Maddie Martin	5 ft 7 in (1.7 m)	RS Fr	Dunmore	Dunmore, PA
G	10	Jillian Libby	5 ft 11 in (1.8 m)	RS Jr	Cheverus	South Portland, ME
G	11	Jordan Ireland	5 ft 7 in (1.7 m)	Sr	Garnet Valley	Garnet Valley, PA
G	13	Kelly Guarino	5 ft 9 in (1.75 m)	RS Sr	Albertus Magnus	Thells, NY
G	14	Amarri Trueheart	5 ft 3 in (1.6 m)	RS Jr	Cheltenham; Albany	Cheltenham, PA
G	15	Samantha Schultz	5 ft 10 in (1.78 m)	Fr	Kings Park	Kings Park, NY
G	20	Danielle Tunstall	5 ft 11 in (1.8 m)	Jr	Life Center Academy	Willingboro, NJ
F	21	Lucia Martinez-Ortiz	6 ft 2 in (1.88 m)	So	Colegio Internacional Nuevo Centro	Guadarrama, Spain
G	22	Tatianna Torres	5 ft 10 in (1.78 m)	RS Sr	Thomas A. Edison	Arlington, VA
G	24	Tracey Brereton	5 ft 9 in (1.75 m)	Jr	Matawan Regional	Aberdeen, NJ
G	25	Dez Allen	5 ft 10 in (1.78 m)	So	Neptune	Neptune, NJ
F	31	Milena Bajic	6 ft 1 in (1.85 m)	RS Jr	Gimnazija Slobodan Škerović; Memphis	Podgorica, Montenegro
G	44	Ellyn Stoll	5 ft 8 in (1.73 m)	So	St. Rose	Point Pleasant, NJ

Head coach

- Mike Lane (Notre Dame)

Assistant coach(es)

- LaTonya Watson (Eastern Michigan)
- Aaron Gratch (Caldwell)
- Sara Mitchell (King)

Legend

- (C) Team captain
- (S) Suspended
- (I) Ineligible
- (W) Walk-on
- Injured
- Current redshirt

Roster

== Schedule ==
Date time, TV	Rank^{#}	Opponent^{#}	Result	Record	Site (attendance) city, state
Non-conference regular season
Nov 6, 2018*; 7:00 pm		at Saint Peter's	L 57–70	0–1	Yanitelli Center (652); Jersey City, NJ
Nov 9, 2018*; 3:00 pm		at Howard	L 57–77	0–2	Burr Gymnasium (589); Washington, D.C.
Nov 11, 2018*; 2:00 pm		at West Virginia	L 50–95	0–3	WVU Coliseum (1,209); Morgantown, WV
Nov 17, 2018*; 2:00 pm, ESPN+		at Penn	L 42–85	0–4	Palestra (405); Philadelphia, PA
Nov 20, 2018*; 7:00 pm		at Fairleigh Dickinson	L 43–64	0–5	Rothman Center (178); Teaneck, NJ
Nov 24, 2018*; 1:00 pm, ESPN+		Western Carolina; NJIT Thanksgiving Classic	W 79–71	1–5	Wellness and Events Center (477); Newark, NJ
Nov 25, 2018*; 2:00 pm		Southeast Missouri State; NJIT Thanksgiving Classic	L 58–68	1–6	Wellness and Events Center (399); Newark, NJ
Nov 28, 2018*; 7:00 pm, ESPN+		at Rider	L 46–67	1–7	Alumni Gymnasium (720); Lawrenceville, NJ
Dec 2, 2018*; 1:00 pm, ESPN+		Vermont	L 63–71	1–8	Wellness and Events Center (405); Newark, NJ
Dec 9, 2018*; 2:00 pm		at LIU Brooklyn	W 72–51	2–8	Steinberg Wellness Center (372); Brooklyn, NY
Dec 14, 2018*; 6:00 pm		at Colgate	W 71–53	3–8	Cotterell Court (196); Hamilton, NY
Dec 21, 2018*; 2:00 pm, ESPN+		Kent State	L 40–57	3–9	Wellness and Events Center (322); Newark, NJ
Dec 30, 2018*; 2:00 pm, ESPN+		Hartford	L 53–83	3–10	Wellness and Events Center (402); Newark, NJ
Atlantic Sun regular season
Jan 5, 2019; 1:00 pm, ESPN+		Kennesaw State	W 66–60	4–10 (1–0)	Wellness and Events Center (330); Newark, NJ
Jan 12, 2019; 2:00 pm, ESPN+		at North Alabama	L 60–72	4–11 (1–1)	Flowers Hall (983); Florence, AL
Jan 15, 2019; 11:30 am, ESPN+		Lipscomb	W 80–67	5–11 (2–1)	Wellness and Events Center (1,903); Newark, NJ
Jan 19, 2019; 1:00 pm, ESPN+		Jacksonville	L 56–61	5–12 (2–2)	Wellness and Events Center (195); Newark, NJ
Jan 22, 2019; 7:00 pm, ESPN+		at Stetson	L 48–74	5–13 (2–3)	Edmunds Center (401); DeLand, FL
Jan 27, 2019; 2:00 pm, ESPN+		North Alabama	L 54–75	5–14 (2–4)	Wellness and Events Center (315); Newark, NJ
Jan 29, 2019; 7:00 pm, ESPN+		Florida Gulf Coast	L 35–67	5–15 (2–5)	Wellness and Events Center (200); Newark, NJ
Feb 2, 2019; 2:00 pm, ESPN+		at Liberty	L 47–58	5–16 (2–6)	Vines Center (1,302); Lynchburg, VA
Feb 9, 2019; 2:00 pm, ESPN+		at Kennesaw State	L 47–70	5–17 (2–7)	KSU Convocation Center (1,374); Kennesaw, GA
Feb 12, 2019; 7:00 pm, ESPN+		at Florida Gulf Coast	L 42–61	5–18 (2–8)	Alico Arena (2,481); Fort Myers, FL
Feb 16, 2019; 1:00 pm, ESPN+		North Florida	L 59–78	5–19 (2–9)	Wellness and Events Center (370); Newark, NJ
Feb 19, 2019; 7:00 pm, ESPN+		Stetson	L 47–56	5–20 (2–10)	Wellness and Events Center (201); Newark, NJ
Feb 23, 2019; 1:00 pm, ESPN+		at Jacksonville	L 55–69	5–21 (2–11)	Swisher Gymnasium (75); Jacksonville, FL
Feb 27, 2019; 7:30 pm, ESPN+		at Lipscomb	W 69–53	6–21 (3–11)	Allen Arena (807); Nashville, TN
Mar 2, 2019; 1:00 pm, ESPN+		Liberty	L 39–58	6–22 (3–12)	Wellness and Events Center (401); Newark, NJ
Mar 7, 2019; 7:00 pm, ESPN+		at North Florida	L 46–54	6–23 (3–13)	UNF Arena (401); Jacksonville, FL
Atlantic Sun Women's Tournament
Mar 8, 2019; 7:00 pm, ESPN+	(8)	at (1) Florida Gulf Coast; Quarterfinals	L 45–58	6–24	Alico Arena (1,542); Fort Myers, FL
*Non-conference game. ^{#}Rankings from AP Poll. (#) Tournament seedings in parentheses. All times are in Eastern Time.

== See also ==
- 2018–19 NJIT Highlanders men's basketball team
