= 2019 ASUN women's basketball tournament =

- Classification: Division I
- Season: 2018–19
- Teams: 8
- Site: Campus sites
- Finals site: Alico Arena; Fort Myers, Florida
- Champions: Florida Gulf Coast (6th title)
- Winning coach: Karl Smesko (6th title)
- MVP: Keri Jewett-Giles (Florida Gulf Coast)
- Television: ESPN+

2018–19 ASUN women's basketball standings
	Conf.				Overall
Team	W		L	PCT	W		L	PCT
Florida Gulf Coast †	16	–	0	1.000	28	–	5	.848
Stetson	11	–	5	.688	16	–	16	.500
North Alabama	10	–	6	.625	21	–	9	.700
Liberty	10	–	6	.625	16	–	16	.500
North Florida	9	–	7	.563	15	–	14	.517
Jacksonville	7	–	9	.438	14	–	16	.467
Kennesaw State	4	–	12	.250	9	–	22	.290
NJIT	3	–	13	.188	6	–	24	.200
Lipscomb	2	–	14	.125	4	–	25	.138
† 2019 ASUN Tournament winner Rankings from AP poll

The 2019 ASUN women's basketball tournament was the 33re edition of the ASUN Conference championship. It took place March 8, 13, and 17 in several arenas at campus sites. Florida Gulf Coast won the conference tournament championship game over Liberty, 72–49.

== Format ==
The ASUN Championship is a three-day single-elimination tournament. Eight teams will compete in the championship, with the higher seeded team in each matchup hosting the game.

== Seeds ==
Seed	School	Conference	Overall	Tiebreaker
1	Florida Gulf Coast	16–0	25–4	
2	Stetson	11–5	16–14	
3	Liberty	10–6	14–15	2–0 vs. North Alabama
4	North Alabama	10–6	19–7	0–2 vs. Liberty
5	North Florida	9–7	14–13	
6	Jacksonville	7–9	14–15	
7	Kennesaw State	4–12	8–21	
8	NJIT	3–13	6–23	
Overall records are as of the end of the regular season.

== Schedule ==
Game	Matchup^{#}	Time*	Television	Attendance
Quarterfinals – Friday, March 8
1	No. 8 NJIT at No. 1 Florida Gulf Coast	7:00 pm	ESPN+	1,542
2	No. 7 Kennesaw State at No. 2 Stetson	7:00 pm	ESPN+	286
3	No. 6 Jacksonville at No. 3 Liberty	7:00 pm	ESPN+	190
4	No. 5 North Florida at No. 4 North Alabama	7:30 pm	ESPN+	1,041
Semifinals – Wednesday, March 13
5	No. 7 Kennesaw State at No. 1 Florida Gulf Coast	7:00 pm	ESPN+	1,822
6	No. 5 North Florida at No. 3 Liberty	7:00 pm	ESPN+	365
Championship – Sunday, March 17
7	No. 3 Liberty at No. 1 Florida Gulf Coast	3:00 pm	ESPN+	2,557
*Game times in ET. #-Rankings denote tournament seeding. All games hosted by higher-seeded team.

== Bracket ==
Quarterfinals; March 8 ESPN+
1	Florida Gulf Coast	58
8	NJIT	45
2	Stetson	59
7	Kennesaw State	67
3	Liberty	65
6	Jacksonville	53
4	North Alabama	53
5	North Florida	55

Semifinals; March 13; ESPN+
1	Florida Gulf Coast	77
7	Kennesaw State	48
3	Liberty	65
5	North Florida	51

Championship; March 17; ESPN+
3	Liberty	49
1	Florida Gulf Coast	72

== See also ==
- 2019 Atlantic Sun men's basketball tournament
