= 2018–19 North Florida Ospreys women's basketball team =

Intercollegiate basketball season

2018–19 North Florida Ospreys women's basketball
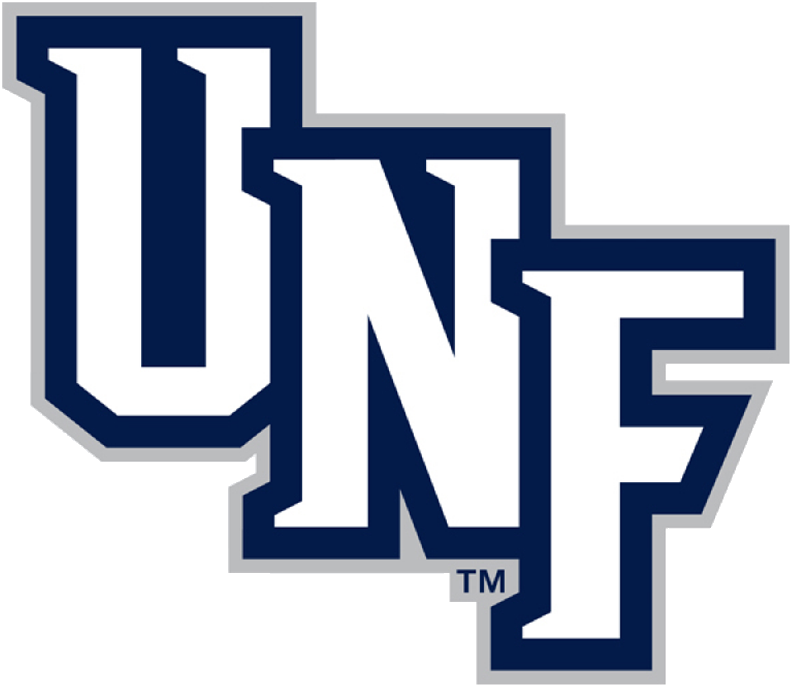
- Conference: Atlantic Sun Conference
- Record: 15–14 (9–7 A-Sun)
- Head coach: Darrick Gibbs (4th season)
- Assistant coaches: Kayla Oxenrider; Khadijah Rushdan
- Home arena: UNF Arena

2018–19 ASUN women's basketball standings
	Conf.				Overall
Team	W		L	PCT	W		L	PCT
Florida Gulf Coast †	16	–	0	1.000	28	–	5	.848
Stetson	11	–	5	.688	16	–	16	.500
North Alabama	10	–	6	.625	21	–	9	.700
Liberty	10	–	6	.625	16	–	16	.500
North Florida	9	–	7	.563	15	–	14	.517
Jacksonville	7	–	9	.438	14	–	16	.467
Kennesaw State	4	–	12	.250	9	–	22	.290
NJIT	3	–	13	.188	6	–	24	.200
Lipscomb	2	–	14	.125	4	–	25	.138
† 2019 ASUN Tournament winner Rankings from AP poll

The 2018–19 North Florida Ospreys women's basketball team represented the University of North Florida in the 2018–19 NCAA Division I women's basketball season. The Ospreys, led by fourth year head coach Darrick Gibbs, played their games at UNF Arena and were members of the Atlantic Sun Conference. They finished the season 15–14, 9–7 in A-Sun play to finish in fifth place. They advanced to the semifinals of A-Sun Tournament, where they lost to Liberty.

== Media ==
All home games and conference road games are shown on ESPN3 or A-Sun.TV.

== Roster ==
2018–19 North Florida Ospreys women's basketball team
Players
Coaches

Pos.	#	Name	Height	Year	Previous school	Hometown
G	0	Cheyenne Patrick	5 ft 11 in (1.8 m)	Fr	East River	Orlando, FL
G	1	Arianna Emanuel-Wright	5 ft 8 in (1.73 m)	Sr	Paxon Advanced Studies; Santa Fe	Jacksonville, FL
G	2	Ty Purifoy	5 ft 1 in (1.55 m)	Sr	Pine Forest; Gulf Coast State	Pensacola, FL
G	3	Tiffany Tolbert	5 ft 8 in (1.73 m)	So	Dr. Phillips	Orlando, FL
G	4	Adrienne Jackson	5 ft 9 in (1.75 m)	Jr	Leesburg	Leesburg, FL
F	10	Sara Idris	6 ft 1 in (1.85 m)	Fr	South Forsyth	Alpharetta, GA
F	11	Jazz Bond	6 ft 4 in (1.93 m)	RS So	Blackman; South Florida	Murfreesboro, TN
F	12	Ariel Scott	6 ft 0 in (1.83 m)	Fr	Alonso	Tampa, FL
G	13	Rhetta Moore	5 ft 8 in (1.73 m)	So	Bishop England	Charleston, SC
G	14	Elli Bartley	5 ft 6 in (1.68 m)	So	Glasgow	Glasgow, KY
G	22	Lauren Gross	5 ft 9 in (1.75 m)	Fr	Northpoint Christian	Southaven, MS
G	24	Janesha Green	5 ft 6 in (1.68 m)	Jr	Samson; Gulf Coast State College	Samson, AL
F	44	Dasha Eremeeva	6 ft 0 in (1.83 m)	Jr	Panola College	Moscow, Russia
G		Alexis Gordon (redshirt)	5 ft 8 in (1.73 m)	Jr	Covenant Christian; FIU	Palm Bay, FL
G		Victoria Patrick (redshirt)	5 ft 8 in (1.73 m)	Jr	Edgewater; South Carolina	Orlando, FL

Head coach

- Darrick Gibbs (Wofford)

Assistant coach(es)

- David Lowery (Bloomsburg)
- Khadijah Rushdan (Rutgers)

Legend

- (C) Team captain
- (S) Suspended
- (I) Ineligible
- (W) Walk-on
- Injured
- Current redshirt

Roster

== Schedule ==
Date time, TV	Rank^{#}	Opponent^{#}	Result	Record	Site (attendance) city, state
Non-conference regular season
Nov 6, 2018*; 11:00 am, ACCNE		at Florida State	L 53–74	0–1	Donald L. Tucker Center (2,191); Tallahassee, FL
Nov 13, 2018*; 11:00 am, ESPN+		Trinity Baptist	W 99–40	1–1	UNF Arena (3,813); Jacksonville, FL
Nov 16, 2018*; 7:00 pm, ESPN+		Florida A&M	W 64–53	2–1	UNF Arena (473); Jacksonville, FL
Nov 18, 2018*; 2:00 pm		at Indiana	L 52–75	2–2	Simon Skjodt Assembly Hall (3,298); Bloomington, IN
Nov 29, 2018*; 5:30 pm		Charleston Southern	W 82–76 ^{OT}	3–2	UNF Arena (751); Jacksonville, FL
Dec 2, 2018*; 2:00 pm		at Colorado State	W 61–59	3–3	Moby Arena (941); Fort Collins, CO
Dec 11, 2018*; 7:00 pm, ESPN+		FIU	W 62–53	4–3	UNF Arena (257); Jacksonville, FL
Dec 15, 2018*; 3:00 pm		at Bethune–Cookman	L 60–76	4–4	Moore Gymnasium (311); Daytona Beach, FL
Dec 20, 2018*; 2:00 pm, ESPN+		Alabama A&M; UNF Holiday Classic	L 62–63	4–5	UNF Arena (205); Jacksonville, FL
Dec 21, 2018*; 2:00 pm, ESPN+		Warner; UNF Holiday Classic	W 67–36	5–5	UNF Arena (171); Jacksonville, FL
Dec 28, 2018*; 2:00 pm		at Ole Miss	L 69–82	5–6	The Pavilion at Ole Miss (1,284); Oxford, MS
Atlantic Sun regular season
Jan 5, 2019; 1:00 pm, ESPN+		North Alabama	L 64–70	5–7 (0–1)	UNF Arena (301); Jacksonville, FL
Jan 8, 2019; 7:30 pm, ESPN+		at Lipscomb	W 68–53	6–7 (1–1)	Allen Arena (870); Nashville, TN
Jan 12, 2019; 1:00 pm, ESPN+		Florida Gulf Coast	L 66–105	6–8 (1–2)	UNF Arena (423); Jacksonville, FL
Jan 15, 2019; 7:00 pm, ESPN+		Stetson	W 71–57	7–8 (2–2)	UNF Arena (308); Jacksonville, FL
Jan 19, 2019; 2:00 pm, ESPN+		at Liberty	L 53–69	7–9 (2–3)	Vines Center (1,304); Lynchburg, VA
Jan 22, 2019; 7:00 pm, ESPN+		Jacksonville	L 72–80	7–10 (2–4)	UNF Arena (501); Jacksonville, FL
Jan 27, 2019; 2:00 pm, ESPN+		at Florida Gulf Coast	L 48–80	7–11 (2–5)	Alico Arena (2,203); Fort Myers, FL
Jan 29, 2019; 11:00 am, ESPN+		at Kennesaw State	W 71–60	8–11 (3–5)	KSU Convocation Center (365); Kennesaw, GA
Feb 5, 2019; 7:00 pm, ESPN+		Lipscomb	W 72–66	9–11 (4–5)	UNF Arena (436); Jacksonville, FL
Feb 9, 2019; 2:00 pm, ESPN+		at North Alabama	L 62–77	9–12 (4–6)	Flowers Hall (1,252); Florence, AL
Feb 12, 2019; 7:00 pm, ESPN+		Kennesaw State	W 74–66	10–12 (5–6)	UNF Arena (374); Jacksonville, FL
Feb 16, 2019; 1:00 pm, ESPN+		at NJIT	W 78–59	11–12 (6–6)	Wellness and Events Center (370); Newark, NJ
Feb 19, 2019; 7:00 pm, ESPN+		at Jacksonville	L 63–75	11–13 (7–6)	Swisher Gymnasium (402); Jacksonville, FL
Feb 23, 2019; 1:00 pm, ESPN+		Liberty	W 66–54	12–13 (7–7)	UNF Arena (387); Jacksonville, FL
Feb 27, 2019; 7:00 pm, ESPN+		at Stetson	W 75–62	13–13 (8–7)	Edmunds Center (177); DeLand, FL
Mar 5, 2019; 7:00 pm, ESPN+		NJIT	W 54–46	14–13 (9–7)	UNF Arena (401); Jacksonville, FL
Atlantic Sun Women's Tournament
Mar 8, 2019; 7:30 pm, ESPN+	(5)	at (4) North Alabama; Quarterfinals	W 55–53	15–13	Flowers Hall (1,041); Florence, AL
Mar 13, 2019; 7:00 pm, ESPN+	(5)	at (3) Liberty; Semifinals	L 51–65	15–14	Vines Center (365); Lynchburg, VA
*Non-conference game. ^{#}Rankings from AP Poll. (#) Tournament seedings in parentheses. All times are in Eastern Time.

== See also ==
- 2018–19 North Florida Ospreys men's basketball team
