= 2018–19 North Alabama Lions women's basketball team =

Intercollegiate basketball season

2018–19 North Alabama Lions women's basketball

Women's Basketball Invitational, Semifinals
- Conference: Atlantic Sun Conference
- Record: 21–9 (10–6 ASUN)
- Head coach: Missy Tiber (6th season)
- Assistant coaches: Adrianne Harlow; Josh Ashley; Ellen Holton
- Home arena: Flowers Hall

2018–19 ASUN women's basketball standings
	Conf.				Overall
Team	W		L	PCT	W		L	PCT
Florida Gulf Coast †	16	–	0	1.000	28	–	5	.848
Stetson	11	–	5	.688	16	–	16	.500
North Alabama	10	–	6	.625	21	–	9	.700
Liberty	10	–	6	.625	16	–	16	.500
North Florida	9	–	7	.563	15	–	14	.517
Jacksonville	7	–	9	.438	14	–	16	.467
Kennesaw State	4	–	12	.250	9	–	22	.290
NJIT	3	–	13	.188	6	–	24	.200
Lipscomb	2	–	14	.125	4	–	25	.138
† 2019 ASUN Tournament winner Rankings from AP poll

The 2018–19 North Alabama Lions women's basketball team represented University of North Alabama during the 2018–19 NCAA Division I women's basketball season. They were led by head coach Missy Tiber in her sixth season at North Alabama. The Lions played their home games at the Flowers Hall in Florence, Alabama as members of the Atlantic Sun Conference.

This season is North Alabama's first of a four-year transition period from Division II to Division I. As a result, the Lions are not eligible for NCAA postseason play but can participate in the ASUN Tournament. They received an invitation to play in the WBI, where they advanced to the semifinals before losing to North Texas.

== Previous season ==
The Lions finished the 2017–18 season 24-5, 17-3 to finish in second place in Gulf South Conference play. They lost in the first round of the Gulf South tournament, losing to West Alabama. They were invited to the NCAA tournament and lost in the first round to Lee University. The season marked the last season in Division II and the Gulf South Conference for the Lions.

== Roster ==
2018–19 North Alabama Lions women's basketball team
Players
Coaches

Pos.	#	Name	Height	Year	Previous school	Hometown
G	00	Ansley Eubank	5 ft 11 in (1.8 m)	Jr	Oakland HS/UT-Martin	Murfreesboro, TN
G	1	Emma Wallen	5 ft 7 in (1.7 m)	Jr	Lauderdale County HS	Anderson, AL
G	3	Ivy Wallen	5 ft 7 in (1.7 m)	Jr	Lauderdale County HS	Anderson, AL
F	5	Deja Walls	6 ft 0 in (1.83 m)	Fr	Clarksville HS	Clarksville, TN
G	10	Sarah Suttle	5 ft 7 in (1.7 m)	Fr	Buckhorn HS	New Market, AL
G	12	Savannah Stults	5 ft 5 in (1.65 m)	Sr	Lexington HS	Killen, AL
F	14	Darby Madden	5 ft 11 in (1.8 m)	So	Red Bay HS	Russellville, AL
F	20	Katelyn Nunley	5 ft 11 in (1.8 m)	Sr	Belmont HS	Belmont, MS
F	22	Jaylin Austin	6 ft 0 in (1.83 m)	Jr	McAdory HS	Helena, AL
G	24	Kenysha Coulson	5 ft 10 in (1.78 m)	Jr	Lee HS/Lawson State CC	Hunstville, AL
G	25	Olivia Graham	5 ft 6 in (1.68 m)	Fr	Plainview HS	Rainsville, AL
G	30	Savannah Holt	6 ft 1 in (1.85 m)	Fr	East Hickman HS	Lyles TN
F	44	Brittany Panetti	6 ft 2 in (1.88 m)	Jr	Tompkins HS/New Mexico	Katy, TX

Head coach

- Missy Tiber (West Liberty)

Assistant coach(es)

- Adrianne Harlow (West Liberty)
- Josh Ashley (Tarleton State)
- Ellen Holton (Northern Kentucky)

Legend

- (C) Team captain
- (S) Suspended
- (I) Ineligible
- (W) Walk-on
- Injured
- Current redshirt

Roster
Last update: 2018-11-13

== Schedule and results ==
Date time, TV	Rank^{#}	Opponent^{#}	Result	Record	High points	High rebounds	High assists	Site (attendance) city, state
Non-conference regular season
11/06/2018*; 6:00 pm		at Vanderbilt	W 74–71	1–0	19 – E. Wallen	8 – I. Wallen	7 – I. Wallen	Memorial Gymnasium (1,946); Nashville, TN
11/10/2018*; 6:00 pm, ESPN+		Lane	W 98–57	2–0	24 – Panetti	9 – Panetti	14 – I. Wallen	Flowers Hall (597); Florence, AL
11/13/2018*; 6:00 pm, ESPN+		Blue Mountain	W 70–42	3–0	14 – E. Wallen	13 – Coulson	5 – I. Wallen	Flowers Hall (532); Florence, AL
11/17/2018*; 1:00 pm, ESPN+		Stillman	W 99–43	4–0	24 – E. Wallen	7 – Austin	14 – I. Wallen	Flowers Hall (327); Florence, AL
11/19/2018*; 6:00 pm, ESPN+		Alabama State	W 68–42	5–0	17 – Panetti	9 – Panetti	5 – I. Wallen	Flowers Hall (535); Florence, AL
11/24/2018*; 2:00 pm		vs. Southeast Missouri State; NJIT Thanksgiving Classic	W 80–67	6-0	18 – Coulson	4 – Stults	6 – I. Wallen	Wellness and Events Center (399); Newark, NJ
11/25/2018*; 11:00 am		vs. Western Carolina; NJIT Thanksgiving Classic	W 89–66	7–0	16 – E. Wallen	5 – Stults	12 – I. Wallen	Wellness and Events Center; Newark, NJ
12/02/2018*; 1:00 pm		at Xavier	L 81–94 ^{OT}	7-1	25 – Panetti	8 – I. Wallen	11 – I. Wallen	Cintas Center (426); Cincinnati, OH
12/16/2018*; 6:00 pm, ESPN+		Martin Methodist	W 79–48	8–1	29 – Panetti	12 – Coulson	7 – I. Wallen	Flowers Hall (677); Florence, AL
12/17/2018*; 6:30 pm		at Mississippi Valley State	W 86–72	9–1	33 – I. Wallen	8 – Tied	7 – I. Wallen	Harrison Complex (328); Itta Bena, MS
ASUN Regular Season
01/05/2019; 12:00 pm, ESPN+		at North Florida	W 70–64	10–1 (1–0)	28 – Panetti	13 – Panetti	10 – I. Wallen	UNF Arena (301); Jacksonville, FL
01/08/2019; 6:00 pm, ESPN+		Florida Gulf Coast	L 52–68	10–2 (1–1)	14 – Tied	8 – Tied	5 – I. Wallen	Flowers Hall (744); Florence, AL
01/12/2019; 1:00 pm, ESPN+		NJIT	W 72–60	11–2 (2–1)	26 – Panetti	9 – Panetti	9 – I. Wallen	Flowers Hall (983); Florence, AL
01/15/2019; 12:00 pm, ESPN+		at Jacksonville	W 62–59	12–2 (3–1)	22 – Panetti	7 – Tied	4 – Coulson	Swisher Gymnasium (179); Jacksonville, FL
01/19/2019; 1:00 pm, ESPN+		Stetson	W 71–55	13–2 (4–1)	25 – E. Wallen	9 – Coulson	7 – I. Wallen	Flowers Hall (1,076); Florence, AL
01/22/2019; 6:00 pm, ESPN+		Kennesaw State	W 80–55	14–2 (5–1)	35 – I. Wallen	8 – Tied	5 – Tied	Flowers Hall (1,108); Florence, AL
01/27/2019; 12:00 pm, ESPN+		at NJIT	W 75–54	15–2 (6–1)	23 – E. Wallen	8 – Panetti	9 – I. Wallen	Wellness and Events Center (315); Newark, NJ
02/02/2019; 1:30 pm, ESPN+		at Lipscomb	W 81–60	16–2 (7–1)	30 – E. Wallen	13 – Coulson	9 – Eubank	Allen Arena; Nashville, TN
02/05/2019; 6:00 pm, ESPN+		at Florida Gulf Coast	L 51–76	16–3 (7–2)	19 – I. Wallen	10 – Panetti	2 – Coulson	Alico Arena (2,208); Fort Myers, FL
02/09/2019; 1:00 pm, ESPN+		North Florida	W 77–62	17–3 (8–2)	31 – I. Wallen	6 – Tied	10 – I. Wallen	Flowers Hall (1,252); Florence, AL
02/16/2019; 1:00 pm, ESPN+		Liberty	L 57–61	17–4 (8–3)	14 – Panetti	5 – 3 tied	6 – I. Wallen	Flowers Hall (1,198); Florence, AL
02/19/2019; 6:00 pm, ESPN+		at Kennesaw State	L 72–74	17–5 (8–4)	16 – E. Wallen	9 – Tied	4 – Tied	KSU Convocation Center (456); Kennesaw, GA
02/23/2019; 12:00 pm, ESPN+		at Stetson	L 59–69	17–6 (8–5)	20 – Penetti	8 – Tied	5 – I. Wallen	Edmunds Center (263); DeLand, FL
02/27/2019; 6:00 pm, ESPN+		Jacksonville	W 68–59	18–6 (9–5)	21 – Tied	8 – Penetti	8 – Eubank	Flowers Hall (989); Florence, AL
03/02/2019; 1:00 pm, ESPN+		Lipscomb	W 71–50	19–6 (10–5)	16 – Panetti	8 – Eubank	5 – Coulson	Flowers Hall (1,104); Florence, AL
03/05/2019; 6:00 pm, ESPN+		at Liberty	L 48–61	19–7 (10–6)	21 – Panetti	5 – Panetti	5 – Coulson	Vines Center (1,224); Lynchburg, VA
ASUN Tournament
03/08/2019; 6:30 pm, ESPN+	(4)	(5) North Florida; Quarterfinals	L 53–55	19–8	19 – Panetti	8 – Eurbank	4 – E. Wallen	Flowers Hall (1,041); Florence, AL
WBI Tournament
03/21/2019*; 6:00 pm		Georgia State; First Round	W 64–57	20–8	20 – E. Wallen	10 – Panetti	9 – I. Wallen	Flowers Hall (890); Florence, AL
03/24/2019*; 2:00 pm		at Southern Miss; Quarterfinals	W 69–65 ^{OT}	21–8	22 – E. Wallen	10 – I. Wallen	8 – Tied	Reed Green Coliseum (626); Hattiesburg, MS
03/29/2019*; 7:00 pm		at North Texas; Semifinals	L 53–56	21–9	14 – I. Wallen	6 – Tied	4 – Coulson	The Super Pit (684); Denton, TX
*Non-conference game. ^{#}Rankings from AP Poll. (#) Tournament seedings in parentheses. All times are in Central Time.
