= Darnell Haney =

American basketball coach (born 1981)

Current position
- Title: Head coach
- Team: Georgetown
- Conference: Big East
- Record: 53–49 (.520)

Biographical details
- Born: August 12, 1981 (age 45); Miami, Florida, U.S.
- Education: Florida A&M University (2004)

Coaching career (HC unless noted)
- 2006–2009: Jones HS (FL) (assistant)
- 2009: South Lake HS (FL)
- 2010–2013: Jones HS (FL)
- 2013–2018: Jacksonville (assistant)
- 2018–2023: Jacksonville
- 2023: Georgetown (AHC)
- 2023–present: Georgetown

Head coaching record
- Overall: 116–124 (.483)
- Tournaments: 1–1 (WBIT)

Darnell Haney (born August 12, 1981) is an American college basketball coach and currently the head coach of the Georgetown Hoyas women's basketball program. He held the same position at Jacksonville University from 2018 to 2023.

== Coaching career ==
=== Jacksonville (2013–2023) ===
Haney's collegiate coaching career began in 2013 when he was hired as an assistant coach for the Jacksonville Dolphins women's basketball program. Prior to his arrival at Jacksonville, Haney had served as a boys and girls high school basketball coach in Central Florida for several years. Haney became the head coach at Jacksonville in 2018, following the departure of former coach Yolett McPhee-McCuin to the University of Mississippi.

Jacksonville and Haney mutually agreed to a separation following the 2022–23 season.

=== Georgetown (2023–present) ===
In 2023, incoming Georgetown head coach Tasha Butts hired Haney as her associate head coach. He became the team's interim head coach in September 2023 when Butts took a leave of absence from the program due to her breast cancer treatment.

Following Butts' death in October 2023, the university confirmed that Haney would remain the interim coach for the entire season. Haney led the Hoyas to their first-ever appearance in the Big East women's basketball tournament championship game, their first victory over a ranked opponent since 2016, and a berth in the inaugural Women's Basketball Invitation Tournament.

Haney's role as head coach was made permanent in March 2024.

== Head coaching record ==
Record table
Season	Team	Overall	Conference	Standing	Postseason
Jacksonville Dolphins (Atlantic Sun Conference) (2018–2023)
2018–19	Jacksonville	14–16	7–9	6th	
2019–20	Jacksonville	18–12	10–6	4th	
2020–21	Jacksonville	4–17	1–13	9th	
2021–22	Jacksonville	16–13	8–8	5th	
2022–23	Jacksonville	11–17	5–12	10th	
Jacksonville:		63–75 (.457)	31–48 (.392)		
Georgetown Hoyas (Big East Conference) (2023–present)
2023–24	Georgetown	23–12	9–9	6th	WBIT Second Round
2024–25	Georgetown	12–19	4–14	10th	
2025–26	Georgetown	14–17	6–14	8th	
2026–27	Georgetown	4–1	0–0		
Georgetown:		53–49 (.520)	19–37 (.339)		
Total:		116–124 (.483)			
National champion Postseason invitational champion Conference regular season champion Conference regular season and conference tournament champion Division regular season champion Division regular season and conference tournament champion Conference tournament champion
