= Statesville Christian School =

American private Christian school in North Carolina

Location
- 1210 Museum Road; Statesville, North Carolina 28625; United States; 35°48′21″N 80°53′36″W

Information
- School type: Private
- Religious affiliation: Christian
- Established: December 30, 1994
- CEEB code: 343789
- Head of school: Ben Hummel
- Teaching staff: 37
- Grades: K–12
- Enrollment: 284 (2016)
- Average class size: 17
- Student to teacher ratio: 8:1
- Colors: Navy blue and red
- Athletics: North Carolina Independent Schools Athletic Association (NCISAA)
- Website: statesvillechristian.org
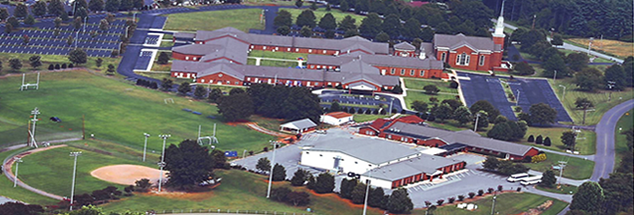

Statesville Christian School in Statesville, North Carolina is a private, nondenominational K-12 Christian school for students in the greater Statesville area.

== History ==
The school was founded on December 30, 1994 as a 501(c)(3) non-profit organization governed by a ten member Board of Trustees. The school opened in the fall of 1995 with 61 students in grades Kindergarten through fifth grade. Today the school enrolls over 230 students in grades Kindergarten through the twelfth grade.

The first senior class graduated in May 2003 with an average SAT score of 1224 and half of the graduates were named AP Scholars by the College Board.

== Athletics ==
Statesville Christian School has an athletics program that includes:

- Girls tennis, 9 consecutive NCISAA 1A state champions starting in 2004
- Girls varsity volleyball, national champions 2007, 2008 (NACA), state champions 2007, 2008 (NCISAA)
- Girls varsity basketball, state playoff appearances for the last 5 consecutive years, state runner up 2012
- Girls varsity soccer, NCISAA champions 2009, 2010, state runner up 2012, state playoff appearances for the last 5 consecutive years
- Girls varsity softball, made their first NCISAA appearance in 2012
- Boys tennis, NCISAA champions 2004, 2005, 2006, 2008, 2009 and 2012, state runner up 2011
- Boys soccer, NCISAA playoff appearances for the last 5 consecutive years
- Boys basketball, NCISAA champions 2005, 2006
- Golf, NCISAA tournament champions 2009
