= 2019 MEAC women's basketball tournament =

Women's college basketball tournament

- Classification: Division I
- Season: 2018–19
- Teams: 12
- Site: Norfolk Scope; Norfolk, Virginia
- Champions: Bethune–Cookman (1st title)
- Winning coach: Vanessa Blair-Lewis (1st title)
- MVP: Angel Golden (Bethune–Cookman)
- Television: ESPN3

2018–19 MEAC women's basketball standings
	Conf.				Overall
Team	W		L	PCT	W		L	PCT
North Carolina A&T	16	–	0	1.000	20	–	12	.625
Maryland-Eastern Shore	12	–	4	.750	17	–	14	.548
Bethune–Cookman †	11	–	5	.688	21	–	11	.656
Howard	10	–	6	.625	18	–	13	.581
Norfolk State	10	–	6	.625	17	–	15	.531
South Carolina State	8	–	8	.500	16	–	16	.500
Morgan State	8	–	8	.500	10	–	21	.323
North Carolina Central	5	–	11	.313	9	–	22	.290
Savannah State	5	–	11	.313	7	–	19	.269
Delaware State	5	–	11	.313	7	–	21	.250
Coppin State	4	–	12	.250	5	–	25	.167
Florida A&M	2	–	14	.125	4	–	25	.138
† 2019 MEAC tournament winner As of March 17, 2019; Rankings from AP poll

The 2019 Mid-Eastern Athletic Conference women's basketball tournament took place March 11–15, 2019, at the Norfolk Scope in Norfolk, Virginia. The first round games were played on March 11 and March 12, and the quarterfinal games will be played on March 13 and 14. The semifinals were held on March 15, with the championship game on March 16. Bethune-Cookman won the championship game over Norfolk State to earn their first ever bid to the NCAA Division I women's basketball tournament.

== Seeds ==
All 12 teams were eligible for the tournament.

Teams were seeded by record within the conference, with a tiebreaker system to seed teams with identical conference records.

Seed	School	Conference	Tiebreaker
1	North Carolina A&T	16–0	
2	Maryland-Eastern Shore	12–4	
3	Bethune–Cookman	11–5	
4	Howard	10–6	
5	Norfolk State	10–6	
6	South Carolina State	8–8	
7	Morgan State	8–8	
8	North Carolina Central	5–11	
9	Delaware State	5–11	
10	Savannah State	5–11	
11	Coppin State	4–12	
12	Florida A&M	2–14	
† – MEAC regular season champions. Overall records are as of the end of the regular season.

== Schedule ==
Session	Game	Time*	Matchup^{#}	Score	Television
First round – Monday, March 11
1	1	1:00 pm	No. 12 Florida A&M vs. No. 5 Howard	53–59	FloHoops
1	2	3:30 pm	No. 11 Coppin State vs. No. 6 Morgan State	50–48	FloHoops
First round – Tuesday, March 12
2	3	1:00 pm	No. 9 North Carolina Central vs. No. 8 Delaware State	80–64	FloHoops
2	4	3:30 pm	No. 10 Savannah State vs. No. 7 South Carolina State	53–62	FloHoops
Quarterfinals – Wednesday, March 13
3	5	12:00 pm			FloHoops
3	6	2:00 pm			FloHoops
Quarterfinals – Thursday, March 14
4	7	12:00 pm	No. 5 Howard vs. No. 4 Norfolk State		FloHoops
4	8	2:00 pm	No. 11 Coppin State vs. No. 3 Bethune–Cookman		FloHoops
Semifinals – Friday, March 15
5	9	12:00 pm			FloHoops
5	10	2:00 pm			FloHoops
Championship – Saturday, March 16
6	11	TBA			ESPN3
*Game times in EST. #-Rankings denote tournament seeding.

== Bracket ==
First round Monday/Tuesday, March 11/12
8	Delaware State	64
9	North Carolina Central	80
5	Howard	59
12	Florida A&M	53
7	South Carolina State	62
10	Savannah State	53
6	Morgan State	48
11	Coppin State	50

Quarterfinals; Wednesday/Thursday, March 13/14
1	N.C. A&T State	79
9	North Carolina Central	49
4	Norfolk State	72
5	Howard	51
2	Maryland E. Shore	57
7	South Carolina State	34
3	Bethune-Cookman	55
11	Coppin State	49

Semifinals; Friday, March 15
1	NC A&T	43
4	Norfolk State	60
2	Maryland Eastern Shore	47
3	Bethune Cookman	58

Championship game Saturday, March 16
4	Norfolk State	43
3	Bethune Cookman	57
