= Angel Elderkin =

American basketball coach (born 1977)

Biographical details
- Born: August 18, 1977 (age 49); East Providence, Rhode Island, U.S.
- Education: University of Southern Maine (BA) ('99) ETSU (MA) ('01)

Playing career
- 1995–1999: Southern Maine

Coaching career (HC unless noted)
- 1999–2001: ETSU (asst.)
- 2001–2005: Siena (asst.)
- 2005–2007: Tennessee (GA/Video Coordinator)
- 2007–2011: UVA (asst.)
- 2011–2012: LSU (Video Coordinator)
- 2012–2013: St. John's (asst.)
- 2013–2014: LSU (asst.)
- 2014–2024: Appalachian State

Head coaching record
- Overall: 135–170 (.443)
- Tournaments: 4–0 (WBI)

Accomplishments and honors

Championships
- 2019 WBI

Awards
- Pat Summitt Most Courageous Award (2017)

Angel Elderkin (born August 18, 1977) is an American college basketball coach and was the head coach of the Appalachian State Mountaineers women's basketball team from 2014 until 2024.

== Coaching career ==
Elderkin played basketball for the women's basketball team at the University of Southern Maine. After graduation, she landed her first coaching job at East Tennessee State as a special assistant to the head coach. Once Elderkin earned a Master of Arts in Physical Education and Exercise Science from ETSU, she accepted an assistant coaching role at Siena. Following the end of the 2004–05 season, Elderkin left Siena and began a graduate assistant role under the legendary Pat Summitt at Tennessee. At Tennessee, she was promoted to video coordinator after one season. Elderkin then spent time as an assistant coach at LSU, St. John's, and Virginia before being named the head coach of the Appalachian State Mountaineers women's basketball team in 2014.

In 2016, Coach Elderkin was diagnosed with ovarian cancer. Despite having to undergo chemotherapy following a stage three cancer diagnosis, Elderkin continued with her head coaching duties. For her bravery in her battle against cancer and continued coaching, Elderkin received the Pat Summitt Most Courageous Award presented by the United States Basketball Writers Association in 2016. Although Little Rock Trojans women's basketball head coach Joe Foley was selected as the 2017 Sun Belt Conference coach of the year, Foley gave his award to Elderkin.

Elderkin guided Appalachian State to the 2019 WBI championship. In 2021, Elderkin signed a four-year extension through the 2026–27 season.

Following the 2023–24 season, Elderkin announced that she would be stepping down from her head coaching role, stating, "This decision was not easy, and was entirely on my own due to personal reasons." During her tenure, Elderkin compiled the second-most wins of any head coach in program history.

== Head coaching record ==
Record table
Season	Team	Overall	Conference	Standing	Postseason
Appalachian State Mountaineers (Sun Belt Conference) (2014–2024)
2014–15	Appalachian State	14–16	9–11	7th	
2015–16	Appalachian State	10–20	7–13	T–7th	
2016–17	Appalachian State	12–19	6–12	9th	
2017–18	Appalachian State	8–23	5–13	9th	
2018–19	Appalachian State	22–14	10–8	5th	2019 WBI Champions
2019–20	Appalachian State	11–19	8–10	T–7th	
2020–21	Appalachian State	15–12	10–8	3rd (East)	
2021–22	Appalachian State	14–12	8–4	4th	
2022–23	Appalachian State	11–20	6–12	T–10th	
2023–24	Appalachian State	17–15	9–9	T–8th	
Appalachian State:		135–170 (.443)	55–34 (.618)		
Total:		135–170 (.443)			
National champion Postseason invitational champion Conference regular season champion Conference regular season and conference tournament champion Division regular season champion Division regular season and conference tournament champion Conference tournament champion
