= 2019 Sun Belt Conference women's basketball tournament =

- Classification: Division I
- Season: 2018–19
- Teams: 10
- Site: Lakefront Arena; New Orleans, Louisiana
- Champions: Little Rock (5th title)
- Winning coach: Joe Foley (5th title)
- MVP: Kyra Collier (Little Rock)
- Television: ESPN+, ESPN3

2018–19 Sun Belt Conference women's basketball standings
	Conf.				Overall
Team	W		L	PCT	W		L	PCT
UT Arlington	15	–	3	.833	24	–	8	.750
Little Rock *†	15	–	3	.833	21	–	11	.656
Troy	13	–	5	.722	22	–	9	.710
Georgia State	11	–	7	.611	17	–	14	.548
Appalachian State	10	–	8	.556	22	–	14	.611
South Alabama	9	–	9	.500	25	–	11	.694
Texas State	9	–	9	.500	14	–	17	.452
Coastal Carolina	8	–	10	.444	17	–	15	.531
Arkansas State	7	–	11	.389	12	–	18	.400
Louisiana	5	–	13	.278	7	–	23	.233
Louisiana–Monroe	4	–	14	.222	10	–	19	.345
Georgia Southern	2	–	16	.111	7	–	22	.241
† 2019 Sun Belt Tournament winner * Tournament #1 seed As of April 3, 2019; Rankings from AP poll

The 2019 Sun Belt Conference women's basketball tournament was the postseason women's basketball tournament for the Sun Belt Conference that occurred from March 11 to March 16, 2019, at the Lakefront Arena in New Orleans. Little Rock won the conference tournament championship game over South Alabama, 57–56.

== Seeds ==
2019 Sun Belt women's basketball tournament seeds and results
Seed	School	Conf.	Over.	Tiebreaker
1	Little Rock	15–3	19–10	2–0 vs. UTA
2	UT Arlington	15–3	23–6	0–2 vs. LR
3	Troy	13–5	22–7	
4	Georgia State	11–7	17–12	
5	Appalachian State	10–8	16–13	
6	Texas State	9–9	14–16	1–0 vs. USA
7	South Alabama	9–9	20–9	0–1 vs. TSU
8	Coastal Carolina	8–10	16–13	
9	Arkansas State	7–11	12–17	
10	Louisiana	5–13	7–22	
‡ – Sun Belt Conference regular season champions.

== Schedule ==
Game	Time	Matchup	Score	Television
First round – Monday, March 11, 2019
1	6:00 pm	No. 9 Arkansas State at No. 8 Coastal Carolina	63–49	ESPN+
2	7:00 pm	No. 10 Louisiana at No. 7 South Alabama	73–61	ESPN+
Second round – Wednesday, March 13, 2019
3	11:30 am	No. 5 Appalachian State vs No. 8 Coastal Carolina	78–42	ESPN+
4	2:00 pm	No. 6 Texas State vs No. 7 South Alabama	68–67	ESPN+
Quarterfinals – Thursday, March 14, 2019
5	11:30 am	No. 4 Georgia State vs. No. 5 Appalachian State	47–45	ESPN+
6	2:00 pm	No. 3 Troy vs. No. 7 South Alabama	87–74	ESPN+
Semifinals – Friday, March 15, 2019
7	11:30 am	No. 1 Little Rock vs. No. 5 Appalachian State	80–64	ESPN+
8	2:00 pm	No. 2 UT Arlington vs. No. 7 South Alabama	50–57	ESPN+
Championship – Saturday, March 16, 2019
11	11:00 am	No. 1 Little Rock vs. No. 7 South Alabama	57–56	ESPN3
Game times are in Central Time. Rankings denote tournament seed.

== Bracket ==
First round Monday, March 11; ESPN+
8	Coastal Carolina	63
9	Arkansas State	49
7	South Alabama	73
10	Louisiana	61

Second round Wednesday, March 13; ESPN+
5	Appalachian State	78
8	Coastal Carolina	42
6	Texas State	67
7	South Alabama	68

Quarterfinals; Thursday, March 14; ESPN+
4	Georgia State	45
5	Appalachian State	47
3	Troy	74
7	South Alabama	87

Semifinals; Friday, March 15; ESPN+
1	Little Rock	80
5	Appalachian State	64
2	UT Arlington	50
7	South Alabama	57

Championship; Saturday, March 16; ESPN3
1	Little Rock	57
7	South Alabama	56

== See also ==
- 2019 Sun Belt Conference men's basketball tournament
