= 2018–19 Arkansas State Red Wolves women's basketball team =

Intercollegiate basketball season

2018–19 Arkansas State Red Wolves women's basketball
- Conference: Sun Belt Conference
- Record: 12–18 (7–11 Sun Belt)
- Head coach: Brian Boyer (19th season)
- Assistant coaches: Autumn Rademacher; Deidra Johnson; Todd Buchanan
- Home arena: First National Bank Arena

2018–19 Sun Belt Conference women's basketball standings
	Conf.				Overall
Team	W		L	PCT	W		L	PCT
UT Arlington	15	–	3	.833	24	–	8	.750
Little Rock †	15	–	3	.833	21	–	11	.656
Troy	13	–	5	.722	22	–	9	.710
Georgia State	11	–	7	.611	17	–	14	.548
Appalachian State	10	–	8	.556	22	–	14	.611
South Alabama	9	–	9	.500	25	–	11	.694
Texas State	9	–	9	.500	14	–	17	.452
Coastal Carolina	8	–	10	.444	17	–	15	.531
Arkansas State	7	–	11	.389	12	–	18	.400
Louisiana	5	–	13	.278	7	–	23	.233
Louisiana–Monroe	4	–	14	.222	10	–	19	.345
Georgia Southern	2	–	16	.111	7	–	22	.241
† 2019 Sun Belt tournament winner

The 2018–19 Arkansas State Red Wolves women's basketball team represented Arkansas State University during the 2018–19 NCAA Division I women's basketball season. The Red Wolves, led by nineteenth year head coach Brian Boyer, play their home games at First National Bank Arena in Jonesboro, Arkansas as members of the Sun Belt Conference. They finished the season 12–18, 7–11 in Sun Belt play to finish in a ninth place. They lost in the first round of the Sun Belt women's tournament to Coastal Carolina.

On March 20, Bryan Boyer's contract wasn't renewed. He finish at Arkansas State with a 19-year record of 333–287. On March 29, the school hired former Central Arkansas/Marshall head coach and Jonesboro, Arkansas native Matt Daniel for the job.

== Roster ==
2018–19 Arkansas State Red Wolves women's basketball team
Players
Coaches

Pos.	#	Name	Height	Year	Previous school	Hometown
G	0	Jada Ford	5 ft 9 in (1.75 m)	Jr	Muskogee HS	Muskogee, OK
G	1	Jireh Washington	5 ft 9 in (1.75 m)	Fr	Central HS	Memphis, TN
G	2	Starr Taylor	5 ft 6 in (1.68 m)	Jr	Jonesboro HS	Jonesboro, AR
G	3	Morgan Wallace	5 ft 10 in (1.78 m)	So	Pulaski Academy	Little Rock, AR
G	5	Payton Tennison	5 ft 11 in (1.8 m)	Jr	Valley Springs HS	Valley Springs, AR
G	10	Akasha Westbrook	5 ft 10 in (1.78 m)	RS Sr	Malvern HS	Malvern, AR
F	11	Lycia Peevy	6 ft 2 in (1.88 m)	So	Paris HS	Paris, AR
G	14	Ashley Clayborn	5 ft 9 in (1.75 m)	Sr	Hot Springs HS; Tyler JC	Hot Springs, AR
F	21	Shameka Tubbs	6 ft 0 in (1.83 m)	Jr	Northridge HS; Labette CC	Tuscaloosa, AL
G	22	Maggie Mahan	5 ft 9 in (1.75 m)	Fr	Nemo Vista HS	Center Ridge, AR
F	23	Trinitee Jackson	6 ft 3 in (1.91 m)	Fr	Christian County HS	Hopkinsville, KY
G	24	Jordan Elder	5 ft 7 in (1.7 m)	Fr	Nettleton HS	Joiner, AR
F	25	Kayla Williams	6 ft 1 in (1.85 m)	RS So	Overton HS; Wichita State	Memphis, TN
G/F	35	Peyton Martin	5 ft 11 in (1.8 m)	So	Watson Chapel HS	Pine Bluff, AR
F	50	Madison Heckert	6 ft 4 in (1.93 m)	Jr	West Carroll HS	Atwood, TN

Head coach

- Brian Boyer (Missouri Western)

Assistant coach(es)

- Autumn Rademacher (Detroit Mercy)
- Deidra Johnson (Oklahoma State)
- Todd Buchanan (Murray State)

Legend

- (C) Team captain
- (S) Suspended
- (I) Ineligible
- (W) Walk-on
- Injured
- Current redshirt

Roster

== Schedule ==
Date time, TV	Rank^{#}	Opponent^{#}	Result	Record	Site (attendance) city, state
Exhibition
Oct 30, 2018*; 7:00 pm		Arkansas–Fort Smith	W 100–73		First National Bank Arena (617); Jonesboro, AR
Nov 5, 2018*; 6:00 pm		Arkansas–Monticello	W 84–61		First National Bank Arena (477); Jonesboro, AR
Non-conference regular season
Nov 9, 2018*; 11:00 am		at Oklahoma State	L 60–62	0–1	Gallagher-Iba Arena (2,576); Stillwater, OK
Nov 12, 2018*; 7:00 pm		Memphis	W 77–66	1–1	First National Bank Arena; Jonesboro, AR
Nov 17, 2018*; 1:00 pm, ESPN+		at UT Martin	L 91–97 ^{OT}	1–2	Skyhawk Arena (1,703); Martin, TN
Nov 20, 2018*; 7:00 pm		Louisiana Tech	L 70–80	1–3	First National Bank Arena (681); Jonesboro, AR
Nov 23, 2018*; 4:00 pm		at No. 20 Texas A&M	L 56–97	1–4	Reed Arena (5,341); College Station, TX
Nov 27, 2018*; 7:00 pm		Murray State	W 74–63	2–4	First National Bank Arena (719); Jonesboro, AR
Dec 1, 2018*; 2:00 pm		at UTEP	W 67–66	3–4	Don Haskins Center (381); El Paso, TX
Dec 9, 2018*; 2:00 pm		Tulsa	W 73–60	4–4	First National Bank Arena (671); Jonesboro, AR
Dec 13, 2018*; 11:30 am		Mississippi Valley State	W 60–57	5–4	First National Bank Arena (5,412); Jonesboro, AR
Dec 21, 2018*; 12:00 pm, ESPN+		at Belmont	L 55–74	5–5	Curb Event Center (578); Nashville, TN
Dec 30, 2018*; 2:00 pm		at Missouri	L 50–70	5–6	Mizzou Arena (5,265); Columbia, MO
Sun Belt regular season
Jan 3, 2019; 7:00 pm		Louisiana	W 87–75	6–6 (1–0)	First National Bank Arena (739); Jonesboro, AR
Jan 5, 2019; 4:00 pm		Louisiana–Monroe	W 64–54	7–6 (2–0)	First National Bank Arena (639); Jonesboro, AR
Jan 10, 2019; 7:00 pm, ESPN+		at South Alabama	W 77–64	8–6 (3–0)	Mitchell Center (474); Mobile, AL
Jan 12, 2019; 2:00 pm, ESPN+		at Troy	L 79–87	8–7 (3–1)	Trojan Arena (1,407); Troy, AL
Jan 17, 2019; 7:00 pm, ESPN+		UT Arlington	L 73–100	8–8 (3–2)	First National Bank Arena (621); Jonesboro, AR
Jan 19, 2019; 4:00 pm, ESPN+		Texas State	L 62–85	8–9 (3–3)	First National Bank Arena (611); Jonesboro, AR
Jan 24, 2019; 5:30 pm		at Appalachian State	L 67–75	8–10 (3–4)	Holmes Center (264); Boone, NC
Jan 26, 2019; 1:00 pm		at Coastal Carolina	L 72–88	8–11 (3–5)	HTC Center (313); Conway, NC
Feb 2, 2019; 3:00 pm, ESPN+		at Little Rock	L 55–68	8–12 (3–6)	Jack Stephens Center; Little Rock, AR
Feb 7, 2019; 7:00 pm, ESPN+		South Alabama	W 69–58	9–12 (4–6)	First National Bank Arena (587); Jonesboro, AR
Feb 9, 2019; 4:00 pm, ESPN+		Troy	L 89–100	9–13 (4–7)	First National Bank Arena (897); Jonesboro, AR
Feb 14, 2019; 7:00 pm, ESPN+		at Texas State	L 62–85	9–14 (4–8)	Strahan Arena (1,026); San Marcos, TX
Feb 16, 2019; 2:00 pm, ESPN+		at UT Arlington	L 62–67	9–15 (4–9)	College Park Center (1,014); Arlington, TX
Feb 23, 2019; 1:00 pm, ESPN+		Little Rock	W 62–58	10–15 (5–9)	First National Bank Arena (871); Jonesboro, AR
Feb 28, 2019; 7:00 pm, ESPN+		Georgia State	L 62–64	10–16 (5–10)	First National Bank Arena (781); Jonesboro, AR
Mar 2, 2019; 4:00 pm, ESPN+		Georgia Southern	W 86–75	11–16 (6–10)	First National Bank Arena (716); Jonesboro, AR
Mar 7, 2019; 6:30 pm, ESPN+		at Louisiana–Monroe	L 53–65	11–17 (6–11)	Fant–Ewing Coliseum (955); Monroe, LA
Mar 9, 2019; 2:00 pm, ESPN+		at Louisiana	W 75–73	12–17 (7–11)	Cajundome (1,179); Lafayette, LA
Sun Belt Women's Tournament
Mar 11, 2019; 5:00 pm, ESPN+	(9)	at (8) Coastal Carolina; First Round	L 49–63	12–18	HTC Center (197); Conway, SC
*Non-conference game. ^{#}Rankings from AP Poll. (#) Tournament seedings in parentheses. All times are in Eastern Time.

== See also ==
2018–19 Arkansas State Red Wolves men's basketball team
