= 2018–19 Georgia State Panthers women's basketball team =

Intercollegiate basketball season

2018–19 Georgia State Panthers women's basketball

WBI, First Round
- Conference: Sun Belt Conference
- Record: 17–14 (11–7 Sun Belt)
- Head coach: Gene Hill (1st season)
- Assistant coaches: Katie Pate; A. G. Hall; Tiffany Morton
- Home arena: GSU Sports Arena

2018–19 Sun Belt Conference women's basketball standings
	Conf.				Overall
Team	W		L	PCT	W		L	PCT
UT Arlington	15	–	3	.833	24	–	8	.750
Little Rock †	15	–	3	.833	21	–	11	.656
Troy	13	–	5	.722	22	–	9	.710
Georgia State	11	–	7	.611	17	–	14	.548
Appalachian State	10	–	8	.556	22	–	14	.611
South Alabama	9	–	9	.500	25	–	11	.694
Texas State	9	–	9	.500	14	–	17	.452
Coastal Carolina	8	–	10	.444	17	–	15	.531
Arkansas State	7	–	11	.389	12	–	18	.400
Louisiana	5	–	13	.278	7	–	23	.233
Louisiana–Monroe	4	–	14	.222	10	–	19	.345
Georgia Southern	2	–	16	.111	7	–	22	.241
† 2019 Sun Belt tournament winner

The 2018–19 Georgia State Panthers women's basketball team represented Georgia State University in the 2018–19 NCAA Division I women's basketball season. The Panthers, led by first year head coach Gene Hill, were a member of the Sun Belt Conference and played their home games on campus at the GSU Sports Arena. They finished season 17–14, 11–7 in Sun Belt play to finish in fourth place. They lost in the quarterfinals of the Sun Belt women's tournament to Appalachian State. They received an invitation to the WBI where they lost to North Alabama in the first round.

== Roster ==
2018–19 Georgia State Panthers women's basketball team
Players
Coaches

Pos.	#	Name	Height	Year	Previous school	Hometown
F	0	Allison Johnson	6 ft 0 in (1.83 m)	RS Sr	Norcross; Kennesaw State	Norcross, GA
G	1	Janessa Murphey	5 ft 7 in (1.7 m)	Sr	Dutchtown; Tallahassee CC	McDonough, GA
F	2	K. K. Williams	5 ft 10 in (1.78 m)	Sr	Blackman	Murfreesboro, TN
G	10	Shemyah Wilson (W)	5 ft 5 in (1.65 m)	So	New Manchester	Douglasville, GA
C	12	Walnatia Wright	6 ft 2 in (1.88 m)	RS Sr	Laney; Texas A&M	Augusta, GA
G	13	Jada Lewis	5 ft 7 in (1.7 m)	RS So	McEachern	Powder Springs, GA
G	14	Jo'cilin Moore (W)	5 ft 2 in (1.57 m)	Sr	Mitchell County	Camilla, GA
G	15	Madison Erwin	5 ft 7 in (1.7 m)	Jr	Freedom; Mars Hill	Morganton, NC
F	20	Francesca Minali	6 ft 2 in (1.88 m)	RS Sr	Northeast CC	Stezzano, Italy
G	21	Kierra Henry	5 ft 9 in (1.75 m)	Sr	Pope	Marietta, GA
C	30	Shaquanda Miller-McCray	6 ft 3 in (1.91 m)	Jr	Crestwood	Sumter, SC
G/F	32	Victoria Middlebrooks	6 ft 1 in (1.85 m)	Sr	Griffin; Southwest Tennessee CC	Griffin, GA
F/C	33	Rakeah Williams	6 ft 1 in (1.85 m)	So	Westlake	Atlanta, GA

Head coach

- Gene Hill (Coker)

Assistant coach(es)

- Katie Pate (Coker)
- A. G. Hall (North Carolina Central)
- Tiffany Morton (UW–Whitewater)

Legend

- (C) Team captain
- (S) Suspended
- (I) Ineligible
- (W) Walk-on
- Injured
- Current redshirt

Roster

== Schedule ==
Date time, TV	Rank^{#}	Opponent^{#}	Result	Record	Site (attendance) city, state
Exhibition
Nov 2, 2018*; 7:00 pm		Shorter	W 73–51		GSU Sports Arena (253); Atlanta, GA
Non-conference regular season
Nov 7, 2018*; 11:00 am, ESPN+		UNC Greensboro	W 70–63	1–0	GSU Sports Arena (394); Atlanta, GA
Nov 10, 2018*; 12:00 pm		at Florida Atlantic	W 75–59	2–0	FAU Arena (560); Boca Raton, FL
Nov 12, 2018*; 7:00 pm		at FIU	W 67–61	3–0	Ocean Bank Convocation Center (301); Miami, FL
Nov 23, 2018*; 3:00 pm		at Rice	L 49–66	3–1	Tudor Fieldhouse (383); Houston, TX
Nov 29, 2018*; 12:00 pm		at Middle Tennessee	L 62–66	3–2	Murphy Center (11,310); Murfreesboro, TN
Dec 2, 2018*; 2:00 pm, ESPN+		Georgia Tech	L 71–78	3–3	GSU Sports Arena (797); Atlanta, GA
Dec 13, 2018*; 6:00 pm, ESPN+		Kennesaw State	W 79–73 ^{OT}	4–3	GSU Sports Arena (415); Atlanta, GA
Dec 13, 2018*; 3:00 pm		at Jacksonville State	L 56–61 ^{OT}	4–4	Pete Mathews Coliseum (245); Jacksonville, AL
Dec 20, 2018*; 1:00 pm, ESPN+		North Carolina Central; GSU Holiday Classic	W 65–54	5–4	GSU Sports Arena (355); Atlanta, GA
Dec 21, 2018*; 3:00 pm		Bethune–Cookman; GSU Holiday Classic	W 62–54	6–4	GSU Sports Arena (357); Atlanta, GA
Dec 29, 2018*; 2:00 pm, ACCNE		at Florida State	L 43–79	6–5	Donald L. Tucker Center (2,578); Tallahassee, FL
Sun Belt regular season
Jan 3, 2019; 6:00 pm, ESPN+		UT Arlington	W 50–48	7–5 (1–0)	GSU Sports Arena (376); Atlanta, GA
Jan 5, 2019; 2:00 pm, ESPN+		Texas State	L 60–69	7–6 (1–1)	GSU Sports Arena (350); Atlanta, GA
Jan 10, 2019; 8:00 pm, ESPN+		at Louisiana	L 54–57	7–7 (1–2)	Cajundome (1,136); Lafayette, LA
Jan 12, 2019; 1:00 pm		at Louisiana–Monroe	W 56–41	8–7 (2–2)	Fant–Ewing Coliseum (1,027); Monroe, LA
Jan 17, 2019; 6:00 pm		South Alabama	L 59–68	8–8 (2–3)	GSU Sports Arena (365); Atlanta, GA
Jan 19, 2019; 2:00 pm, ESPN+		Troy	W 84–80	9–8 (3–3)	GSU Sports Arena (460); Atlanta, GA
Jan 24, 2019; 8:00 pm		at Texas State	W 57–34	10–8 (4–3)	Strahan Arena (1,033); San Marcos, TX
Jan 26, 2019; 3:00 pm		at UT Arlington	L 45–69	10–9 (4–4)	College Park Center (1,107); Arlington, TX
Feb 2, 2019; 2:00 pm		at Georgia Southern; Rivalry	W 83–66	11–9 (5–4)	Hanner Fieldhouse (425); Statesboro, GA
Feb 7, 2019; 6:00 pm, ESPN+		Louisiana–Monroe	W 68–46	12–9 (6–4)	GSU Sports Arena (336); Atlanta, GA
Feb 9, 2019; 2:00 pm, ESPN+		Louisiana	W 74–71	13–9 (7–4)	GSU Sports Arena (375); Atlanta, GA
Feb 14, 2019; 7:00 pm		at Troy	W 85–70	14–9 (8–4)	Trojan Arena (1,349); Troy, AL
Feb 16, 2019; 4:00 pm		at South Alabama	L 59–62	14–10 (8–5)	Mitchell Center (391); Mobile, AL
Feb 21, 2019; 6:00 pm, ESPN+		Appalachian State	W 85–75	15–10 (9–5)	GSU Sports Arena (779); Atlanta, GA
Feb 23, 2019; 2:00 pm		Coastal Carolina	L 62–67	15–11 (9–6)	GSU Sports Arena (682); Atlanta, GA
Feb 28, 2019; 2:00 pm		at Arkansas State	W 64–62	16–11 (10–6)	First National Bank Arena (781); Jonesboro, AR
Mar 2, 2019; 3:00 pm		at Little Rock	L 50–82	16–12 (10–7)	Jack Stephens Center (1,250); Little Rock, AR
Mar 9, 2019; 2:00 pm, ESPN+		Georgia Southern; Rivalry	W 73–66	17–12 (11–7)	GSU Sports Arena (675); Atlanta, GA
Sun Belt Women's Tournament
Mar 14, 2019; 12:30 pm, ESPN+	(4)	vs. (5) Appalachian State; Quarterfinals	L 45–47	17–13	Lakefront Arena; New Orleans, LA
WBI
Mar 21, 2018*; 7:00 pm		at North Alabama; First Round	L 57–64	17–14	Flowers Hall (890); Florence, AL
*Non-conference game. ^{#}Rankings from AP Poll. (#) Tournament seedings in parentheses. All times are in Eastern Time.

== See also ==
- 2018–19 Georgia State Panthers men's basketball team
