= 2018–19 Louisiana–Monroe Warhawks women's basketball team =

American college basketball season

2018–19 Louisiana–Monroe Warhawks women's basketball
- Conference: Sun Belt Conference
- Record: 10–19 (4–14 Sun Belt)
- Head coach: Jeff Dow (5th season)
- Assistant coaches: E.J. Lee Smith; Chelsia Lymon; Josh Cooperwood
- Home arena: Fant–Ewing Coliseum

2018–19 Sun Belt Conference women's basketball standings
	Conf.				Overall
Team	W		L	PCT	W		L	PCT
UT Arlington	15	–	3	.833	24	–	8	.750
Little Rock *†	15	–	3	.833	21	–	11	.656
Troy	13	–	5	.722	22	–	9	.710
Georgia State	11	–	7	.611	17	–	14	.548
Appalachian State	10	–	8	.556	22	–	14	.611
South Alabama	9	–	9	.500	25	–	11	.694
Texas State	9	–	9	.500	14	–	17	.452
Coastal Carolina	8	–	10	.444	17	–	15	.531
Arkansas State	7	–	11	.389	12	–	18	.400
Louisiana	5	–	13	.278	7	–	23	.233
Louisiana–Monroe	4	–	14	.222	10	–	19	.345
Georgia Southern	2	–	16	.111	7	–	22	.241
† 2019 Sun Belt Tournament winner * Tournament #1 seed As of April 3, 2019; Rankings from AP poll

The 2018–19 Louisiana–Monroe women's basketball team represented University of Louisiana at Monroe in the 2018–19 NCAA Division I women's basketball season. The Warhawks, led by fifth year head coach Jeff Dow, played their home games at Fant–Ewing Coliseum and were members of the Sun Belt Conference. They finished the season 10–19, 4–14 in Sun Belt play to finish in eleventh place. They failed to qualify for the Sun Belt women's tournament.

On February 13, Jeff Dow will not return next season. He finish at Louisiana–Monroe with a 5-year record of 44–103.

== Roster ==
2018–19 Louisiana–Monroe Warhawks women's basketball team
Players
Coaches

Pos.	#	Name	Height	Year	Previous school	Hometown
G	2	Amber Johnson	5 ft 7 in (1.7 m)	Jr	Dyer County HS; Walters State CC	Douglasville, GA
G	3	Alexus Johnson	5 ft 11 in (1.8 m)	Sr	Field Kindley HS; Dodge City CC	Coffeyville, KS
G	10	Lauren Marker	5 ft 6 in (1.68 m)	Sr	Ovey Comeaux HS	Lafayette, LA
G/F	11	Whitney Goins	5 ft 11 in (1.8 m)	So	Anacoco HS	Anacoco, LA
G	13	Destini Lunsford	5 ft 7 in (1.7 m)	Jr	Corsicana HS	Corsicana, TX
G	20	Tiara Malone	5 ft 9 in (1.75 m)	RS Fr	Arlington Martin HS	Arlington, TX
F	21	Logan Oesteich	6 ft 0 in (1.83 m)	Jr	Bismarck HS	Arkadelphia, AR
G	22	Lauren Fitch	5 ft 6 in (1.68 m)	Jr	Austin HS; Itawamba CC	Decatur, AL
C	23	Sheniqua Coatney	6 ft 2 in (1.88 m)	Fr	Southwood HS	Shreveport, LA
C	24	Diamond Brooks	6 ft 2 in (1.88 m)	So	Jewel M. Sumner HS	Kentwood, LA
F	25	Marlaina Spearman	5 ft 11 in (1.8 m)	Fr	Stony Point HS	Round Rock, TX
G	30	Arsula Clark	5 ft 9 in (1.75 m)	So	Douglasville HS	Douglasville, GA
F	34	Breauna DeLon	6 ft 0 in (1.83 m)	Fr	Brandeis HS	Helotes, TX
F	35	Jamie Means	6 ft 1 in (1.85 m)	Fr	Denton HS	Little Elm, TX

Head coach

- Jeff Dow (Oregon)

Assistant coach(es)

- E.J. Lee Smith (Louisiana–Monroe)
- Chelsia Lymon (Middle Tennessee)
- David Saur (Thiel)

Legend

- (C) Team captain
- (S) Suspended
- (I) Ineligible
- (W) Walk-on
- Injured
- Current redshirt

Roster

== Schedule ==
Date time, TV	Rank^{#}	Opponent^{#}	Result	Record	Site (attendance) city, state
Non-conference regular season
Nov 9, 2018*; 11:30 am		at SMU	L 38–49	0–1	Moody Coliseum (1,707); Dallas, TX
Nov 11, 2018*; 2:00 pm		at Texas Tech	L 42–86	0–2	United Supermarkets Arena (2,437); Lubbock, TX
Nov 15, 2018*; 11:00 am		LSU–Alexandria	W 93–62	1–2	Fant–Ewing Coliseum (1,313); Monroe, LA
Nov 18, 2018*; 2:00 pm		McNeese State	W 69–60	2–2	Fant–Ewing Coliseum (1,030); Monroe, LA
Nov 25, 2018*; 2:00 pm		at New Orleans	W 57–44	3–2	Lakefront Arena (221); New Orleans, LA
Dec 2, 2018*; 2:00 pm		at Northwestern State	W 63–55	4–2	Prather Coliseum (601); Natchitoches, LA
Dec 9, 2018*; 2:00 pm		Mississippi Valley State	W 72–65	5–2	Fant–Ewing Coliseum (999); Monroe, LA
Dec 14, 2018*; 6:30 pm		Nicholls	L 54–55	5–3	Fant–Ewing Coliseum (1,221); Monroe, LA
Dec 17, 2018*; 5:30 pm		at Southeastern Louisiana	L 42–49	5–4	University Center (521); Hammond, LA
Dec 19, 2018*; 12:00 pm		at Houston Baptist	L 60–68	5–5	Sharp Gymnasium (375); Houston, TX
Dec 30, 2018*; 2:00 pm		Arkansas–Monticello	W 70–39	6–5	Fant–Ewing Coliseum (932); Monroe, LA
Sun Belt regular season
Jan 3, 2019; 6:30 pm		at Little Rock	L 44–63	6–6 (0–1)	Jack Stephens Center (840); Little Rock, AR
Jan 5, 2019; 4:00 pm		at Arkansas State	L 54–64	6–7 (0–2)	First National Bank Arena (639); Jonesboro, AR
Jan 10, 2019; 6:30 pm		Georgia Southern	W 58–57	7–7 (1–2)	Fant–Ewing Coliseum (1,051); Monroe, LA
Jan 12, 2019; 12:00 pm		Georgia State	L 41–56	7–8 (1–3)	Fant–Ewing Coliseum (1,027); Monroe, LA
Jan 19, 2019; 2:00 pm, CST		at Louisiana	L 45–52	7–9 (1–4)	Cajundome (1,124); Lafayette, LA
Jan 24, 2019; 6:00 pm, ESPN+		at Troy	L 56–78	7–10 (1–5)	Trojan Arena (1,471); Troy, AL
Jan 26, 2019; 3:05 pm		at South Alabama	L 49–77	7–11 (1–6)	Mitchell Center (381); Mobile, AL
Jan 31, 2019; 6:30 pm, ESPN+		Coastal Carolina	L 54–79	7–12 (1–7)	Fant–Ewing Coliseum (1,271); Monroe, LA
Feb 2, 2019; 2:00 pm		Appalachian State	L 58–80	7–13 (1–8)	Fant–Ewing Coliseum (1,117); Monroe, LA
Feb 7, 2019; 5:00 pm, ESPN+		at Georgia State	L 46–68	7–14 (1–9)	GSU Sports Arena (336); Atlanta, GA
Feb 9, 2019; 1:00 pm		at Georgia Southern	W 80–62	8–14 (2–9)	Hanner Fieldhouse (512); Statesboro, AR
Feb 16, 2019; 2:00 pm		Louisiana	L 52–55	8–15 (2–10)	Fant–Ewing Coliseum (417); Monroe, LA
Feb 21, 2019; 6:30 pm		Texas State	L 51–62	8–16 (2–11)	Fant–Ewing Coliseum (899); Monroe, LA
Feb 23, 2019; 2:00 pm		UT Arlington	W 66–60 ^{OT}	8–17 (2–12)	Fant–Ewing Coliseum (1,000); Monroe, LA
Feb 28, 2019; 5:30 pm		at Appalachian State	L 51–56	8–18 (2–13)	Holmes Center (723); Boone, NC
Mar 2, 2019; 1:00 pm, ESPN+		at Coastal Carolina	W 60–57	9–18 (3–13)	HTC Center (356); Conway, SC
Mar 7, 2019; 6:30 pm, ESPN+		Arkansas State	W 65–53	10–18 (4–13)	Fant–Ewing Coliseum (955); Monroe, LA
Mar 9, 2019; 2:00 pm		Little Rock	L 38–57	10–19 (4–14)	Fant–Ewing Coliseum (893); Monroe, LA
*Non-conference game. ^{#}Rankings from AP Poll. (#) Tournament seedings in parentheses. All times are in Eastern Time.

== See also ==
2018–19 Louisiana–Monroe Warhawks men's basketball team
