= 2018–19 Louisiana Ragin' Cajuns women's basketball team =

Intercollegiate basketball season

2018–19 Louisiana Ragin' Cajuns women's basketball

Sun Belt Tournament, First Round (L, South Alabama 61–73)
- Conference: Sun Belt Conference
- Record: 7–23 (5–13 Sun Belt)
- Head coach: Garry Brodhead (7th season)
- Assistant coaches: Deacon Jones; Amber Gregg; Valerie Huizar
- Home arena: Cajundome

2018–19 Sun Belt Conference women's basketball standings
	Conf.				Overall
Team	W		L	PCT	W		L	PCT
UT Arlington	15	–	3	.833	24	–	8	.750
Little Rock †	15	–	3	.833	21	–	11	.656
Troy	13	–	5	.722	22	–	9	.710
Georgia State	11	–	7	.611	17	–	14	.548
Appalachian State	10	–	8	.556	22	–	14	.611
South Alabama	9	–	9	.500	25	–	11	.694
Texas State	9	–	9	.500	14	–	17	.452
Coastal Carolina	8	–	10	.444	17	–	15	.531
Arkansas State	7	–	11	.389	12	–	18	.400
Louisiana	5	–	13	.278	7	–	23	.233
Louisiana–Monroe	4	–	14	.222	10	–	19	.345
Georgia Southern	2	–	16	.111	7	–	22	.241
† 2019 Sun Belt tournament winner

The 2018–19 Louisiana Ragin' Cajuns women's basketball team represented the University of Louisiana at Lafayette during the 2018–19 NCAA Division I women's basketball season. The Ragin' Cajuns were led by seventh-year head coach Garry Brodhead and played all home games at the Cajundome along with the Louisiana Ragin' Cajuns men's basketball team. They were members in the Sun Belt Conference.

== Previous season ==
The Ragin' Cajuns finished the 2017–18 season 17–16, 10–8 in Sun Belt play to finish in a three-way tie for sixth place in the conference. They made it to the 2017–18 Sun Belt Conference Women's Basketball semifinal game after defeating the Georgia Southern Eagles 88–81 in 3 overtimes and the UT Arlington Mavericks 54–48. They lost in heartbreaking fashion against the Texas State Bobcats in the semifinals by the score of 56–62. The Ragin' Cajuns did not participate in post-season play.

== Offseason ==
=== Incoming recruits ===
College recruiting information
Name	Hometown	School	Height	Weight	Commit date
Brandi Williams; G	Lake Charles, Louisiana	Barbe HS	5 ft 6 in (1.68 m)	N/A	
Brandi Williams; G	Recruit ratings: Scout: Rivals: 247Sports: (0)				
Andrea Cournoyer; G	Merryville, Louisiana	Merryville HS	5 ft 4 in (1.63 m)	N/A	
Andrea Cournoyer; G	Recruit ratings: Scout: Rivals: 247Sports: (0)				
Diamond Morrison; G	Georgetown, Texas	East View HS	5 ft 4 in (1.63 m)	N/A	
Diamond Morrison; G	Recruit ratings: Scout: Rivals: 247Sports: (0)				
Kristen Daniels; F	Lake Charles, Louisiana	Barbe HS	5 ft 11 in (1.80 m)	N/A	
Kristen Daniels; F	Recruit ratings: Scout: Rivals: 247Sports: (0)				
Jazmyn Womack; G/F	Ponchatoula, Louisiana	Ponchatoula HS	5 ft 11 in (1.80 m)	N/A	
Jazmyn Womack; G/F	Recruit ratings: Scout: Rivals: 247Sports: (0)				
Overall recruit ranking:
Note: In many cases, Scout, Rivals, 247Sports, On3, and ESPN may conflict in their listings of height and weight.; In these cases, the average was taken. ESPN grades are on a 100-point scale.; Sources: "Louisiana 2018 Player Commits". ESPN.; "2018 Team Ranking". Rivals.

== Roster ==
2018–19 Louisiana Ragin' Cajuns women's basketball team
Players
Coaches

Pos.	#	Name	Height	Year	Previous school	Hometown
F	1	Kimberly Burton	5 ft 11 in (1.8 m)	Jr	Red River HS	Shreveport, LA
G	2	Brandi Williams	5 ft 6 in (1.68 m)	Fr	Barbe HS	Lake Charles, LA
G	3	Jasmine Thomas	5 ft 7 in (1.7 m)	Jr	North Caddo HS	Vivian, LA
G	4	Caroline Rivera	5 ft 8 in (1.73 m)	Jr	Arbor View HS; Casper College	Las Vegas, NV
G/F	5	Jomyra Mathais	5 ft 8 in (1.73 m)	So	Landry Walker HS	New Orleans, LA
G	10	Andrea Cournoyer	5 ft 4 in (1.63 m)	Fr	Merryville HS	Merryville, LA
G/F	11	Skyler Goodwin	5 ft 8 in (1.73 m)	So	Parkview Baptist HS	Baton Rouge, LA
G	15	Diamond Morrison	5 ft 4 in (1.63 m)	Fr	East View HS	Georgetown, TX
F	22	Kendall Bess	6 ft 1 in (1.85 m)	RS Jr	Tyler Junior College, Morehead State	Richmond, TX
F	23	Kristen Daniels	5 ft 11 in (1.8 m)	RS Fr	Barbe HS; McNeese State	Lake Charles, LA
G/F	25	Jazmyn Womack	5 ft 11 in (1.8 m)	Fr	Ponchatoula HS	Ponchatoula, LA
C	35	Ty'Reona Doucet	6 ft 1 in (1.85 m)	So	Ville Platte HS	Ville Platte, LA

Head coach

- Garry Boadhead (Louisiana)

Assistant coach(es)

- Deacon Jones (Louisiana)
- Amber Gregg (Texas–San Antonio)
- Valerie Huizar (LSU–Shreveport)

Legend

- (C) Team captain
- (S) Suspended
- (I) Ineligible
- (W) Walk-on
- Injured
- Current redshirt

Roster
Last update: February 24, 2019

== Schedule and results ==
Date time, TV	Rank^{#}	Opponent^{#}	Result	Record	High points	High rebounds	High assists	Site city, state
Exhibition
11/01/2018*; 6:30 pm, CST		LSU–Shreveport	W 89–57		16 – Cournoyer	8 – Womack	6 – Morrison	Cajundome (318); Lafayette, LA
Non-conference regular season
11/06/2018*; 5:00 pm, ESPN+		Lamar	L 77–79 ^{OT}	0–1	18 – Goodwin	15 – Doucet	3 – Goodwin	Cajundome (1,059); Lafayette, LA
11/11/2018*; 2:00 pm		at McNeese State	W 70–59	1–1	16 – Maddox	7 – Robinson	5 – Hughes	H&HP Center (757); Lake Charles, LA
11/14/2018*; 11:00 am, CST		Dillard; 5th Annual Education Game	L 69–72	1–2	21 – Doucet	11 – Mathis	7 – Mathis	Cajundome (2,082); Lafayette, LA
11/19/2018*; 6:30 pm, CST		Jackson State	W 68–61	2–2	14 – Morrison	12 – Doucet	4 – Goodwin	Cajundome (1,326); Lafayette, LA
11/25/2018*; 2:00 pm		at Auburn	L 59–71	2–3	15 – Williams	13 – Doucet	4 – Cournoyer	Auburn Arena (1,488); Auburn, AL
11/30/2018*; 4:30 pm		vs. Texas A&M–Corpus Christi; UTRGV Fall Classic	L 63–64	2–4	13 – Goodwin	11 – Doucet	4 – Goodwin	UTRGV Fieldhouse (113); Edinburg, TX
12/01/2018*; 7:20 pm		vs. UT Rio Grande Valley; UTRGV Fall Classic	L 60–75	2–5	16 – Doucet	5 – Williams	6 – Morrison	UTRGV Fieldhouse (390); Edinburg, TX
12/08/2018*; 2:00 pm, CST		Sam Houston State	L 62–68	2–6	14 – Williams	9 – Doucet	3 – Goodwin	Cajundome (1,124); Lafayette, LA
12/12/2018*; 11:00 am		at Ole Miss	L 57–79	2–7	20 – Doucet	15 – Doucet	7 – Morrison	The Pavilion at Ole Miss (7,389); Oxford, MS
Exhibition
12/15/2018*; 2:00 pm		Xavier (LA)	W 62–52		17 – Doucet	10 – Daniels	5 – Cournoyer	Cajundome (333); Lafayette, LA
Non-conference regular season
12/20/2018*; 6:30 pm, CST		LSU; Battle of the Basin	L 54–76	2–8	12 – Goodwin	5 – Williams	3 – Cournoyer	Cajundome (1,448); Lafayette, LA
12/30/2018*; 2:00 pm		at No. 8 Mississippi State	L 36–104	2–9	9 – Goodwin	7 – Doucet	2 – Cournoyer	Humphrey Coliseum (10,242); Starkville, MS
Conference regular season
01/03/2019; 7:00 pm		at Arkansas State	L 75–87	2–10 (0–1)	25 – Williams	9 – Goodwin	6 – Goodwin	First National Bank Arena (739); Jonesboro, AR
01/05/2019; 3:00 pm		at Little Rock	L 48–62	2–11 (0–2)	12 – Goodwin	9 – Doucet	2 – Morrison	Jack Stephens Center (935); Little Rock, AR
01/10/2019; 7:00 pm, ESPN+		Georgia State; Louisiana Salutes	W 57–54	3–11 (1–2)	23 – Doucet	7 – Doucet	3 – Cournoyer	Cajundome (1,136); Lafayette, LA
01/12/2019; 2:00 pm, ESPN+		Georgia Southern; Biddy Night	W 59–48	4–11 (2–2)	25 – Williams	7 – Doucet	4 – Cournoyer	Cajundome (1,112); Lafayette, LA
01/19/2019; 2:00 pm, CST		Louisiana–Monroe	W 52–45	5–11 (3–2)	12 – Williams	10 – Doucet	3 – Cournoyer	Cajundome (1,124); Lafayette, LA
01/24/2019; 11:05 am		at South Alabama	L 60–83	5–12 (3–3)	23 – Doucet	6 – Goodwin	4 – Goodwin	Mitchell Center (2,152); Mobile, AL
01/26/2019; 2:00 pm, ESPN+		at Troy	L 64–90	5–13 (3–4)	18 – Williams	8 – Goodwin	4 – Cournoyer	Trojan Arena (921); Troy, AL
01/29/2019; 6:30 pm, ESPN+		UT Arlington	L 61–76	5–14 (3–5)	13 – Williams	10 – Goodwin	2 – Mathis	Cajundome (1,084); Lafayette, LA
01/31/2019; 6:30 pm, ESPN+		Appalachian State	W 73–55	6–14 (4–5)	28 – Doucet	15 – Doucet	2 – Mathis	Cajundome (1,091); Lafayette, LA
02/02/2019; 2:00 pm, ESPN+		Coastal Carolina	L 58–76	6–15 (4–6)	12 – Morrison	7 – Doucet	1 – Williams	Cajundome (1,067); Lafayette, LA
02/07/2019; 5:30 pm, ESPN+		at Georgia Southern	L 71–79	6–16 (4–7)	25 – Williams	14 – Doucet	5 – Mathis	Hanner Fieldhouse (576); Statesboro, GA
02/09/2019; 1:00 pm, ESPN+		at Georgia State	L 71–74	6–17 (4–8)	24 – Williams	6 – Doucet	4 – Cournoyer	GSU Sports Arena (375); Atlanta, GA
02/16/2019; 2:00 pm		at Louisiana–Monroe	W 55–52	7–17 (5–8)	15 – Williams	5 – Daniels	5 – Cournoyer	Fant–Ewing Coliseum (417); Monroe, LA
02/23/2019; 2:00 pm, ESPN+		Texas State; Pink Out	L 65–71	7–18 (5–9)	22 – Williams	7 – Williams	3 – Mathis	Cajundome (916); Lafayette, LA
02/28/2019; 5:00 pm, ESPN+		at Coastal Carolina	L 62–67	7–19 (5–10)	13 – Mathis	5 – Williams	2 – Williams	HTC Center (242); Conway, SC
03/02/2019; 1:00 pm		at Appalachian State	L 69–83	7–20 (5–11)	15 – Cournoyer	5 – Bess	4 – Cournoyer	Holmes Center (617); Boone, NC
03/07/2019; 6:30 pm, ESPN+		Little Rock	L 49–62	7–21 (5–12)	11 – Cournoyer	5 – Doucet	3 – Mathis	Cajundome (1,120); Lafayette, LA
03/09/2019; 2:00 pm, ESPN+		Arkansas State; Alumni Night	L 73–75	7–22 (5–13)	16 – Doucet	7 – Doucet	4 – Mathis	Cajundome (1,179); Lafayette, LA
Sun Belt Women's Tournament
03/06/2018; 7:00 pm, ESPN+	(10)	vs. (7) South Alabama; First Round	L 61–73	7–23	15 – Doucet	6 – Tied	3 – Cournoyer	Mitchell Center (244); Mobile, AL
*Non-conference game. ^{#}Rankings from AP Poll. (#) Tournament seedings in parentheses. All times are in Central Time.

== See also ==
- 2018–19 Louisiana Ragin' Cajuns men's basketball team
