= 2018–19 Little Rock Trojans women's basketball team =

Intercollegiate basketball season

2018–19 Little Rock Trojans women's basketball
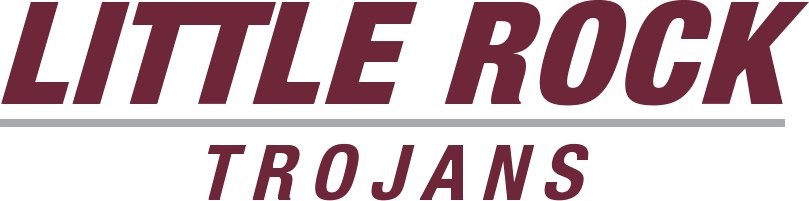

Sun Belt Regular Season co-champions and Tournament Champions

NCAA tournament, first round
- Conference: Sun Belt Conference
- Record: 21–11 (15–3 Sun Belt)
- Head coach: Joe Foley (16th season)
- Assistant coaches: Robert Dallimore; Alicia Cash; Steve Wiedower
- Home arena: Jack Stephens Center

2018–19 Sun Belt Conference women's basketball standings
	Conf.				Overall
Team	W		L	PCT	W		L	PCT
UT Arlington	15	–	3	.833	24	–	8	.750
Little Rock †	15	–	3	.833	21	–	11	.656
Troy	13	–	5	.722	22	–	9	.710
Georgia State	11	–	7	.611	17	–	14	.548
Appalachian State	10	–	8	.556	22	–	14	.611
South Alabama	9	–	9	.500	25	–	11	.694
Texas State	9	–	9	.500	14	–	17	.452
Coastal Carolina	8	–	10	.444	17	–	15	.531
Arkansas State	7	–	11	.389	12	–	18	.400
Louisiana	5	–	13	.278	7	–	23	.233
Louisiana–Monroe	4	–	14	.222	10	–	19	.345
Georgia Southern	2	–	16	.111	7	–	22	.241
† 2019 Sun Belt tournament winner

The 2018–19 Little Rock Trojans women's basketball team represented the University of Arkansas at Little Rock during the 2018–19 NCAA Division I women's basketball season. The Trojans, led by sixteenth year head coach Joe Foley, played their home games at the Jack Stephens Center and were members of the Sun Belt Conference. They finished the season 21–11, 15–3 in Sun Belt play to win the share the Sun Belt regular season title with Texas–Arlington and won the Sun Belt tournament title to earn an automatic trip to the NCAA women's tournament, where they lost in the first round to Gonzaga.

== Roster ==
2018–19 Little Rock Trojans women's basketball team
Players
Coaches

Pos.	#	Name	Height	Year	Previous school	Hometown
F	0	Ronjanae DeGray	6 ft 0 in (1.83 m)	Sr	Mount Juliet HS	Odessa, TX
G	3	Terrion Moore	5 ft 8 in (1.73 m)	So	Leavenworth HS	Kansas City, MO
G	5	Tori Lasker	5 ft 7 in (1.7 m)	So	Mayflower HS	Mayflower, AR
G	12	Sydney Chastain	5 ft 7 in (1.7 m)	Jr	Westmoore HS	Oklahoma City, OK
G	13	Antwainette Walker	5 ft 11 in (1.8 m)	Fr	St. Francis HS	Lisle, IL
G	15	Kiara Scott	5 ft 11 in (1.8 m)	Sr	A. J. Ellender HS	Houma, LA
F	22	Yanina Inkina	6 ft 2 in (1.88 m)	Sr	South Plains	Minsk, Belarus
G	23	Kyra Collier	5 ft 9 in (1.75 m)	Jr	North Little Rock HS	North Little Rock, AR
F	25	Anna Hurlburt	6 ft 1 in (1.85 m)	Jr	Southlake Carroll HS	Southlake, TX
F	30	Raeyana DeGray	5 ft 11 in (1.8 m)	Sr	Mount Juliet HS	Odessa, TX
F	35	Teal Battle	6 ft 1 in (1.85 m)	So	White Station HS	Millington, TN
F	40	Krystan Vornes	6 ft 2 in (1.88 m)	RS Fr	Osceola; Tulsa	Osceola, AR

Head coach

- Joe Foley (Central Arkansas)

Assistant coach(es)

- Robert Dallimore (LSU)
- Alicia Cash (Little Rock)
- Steve Wiedower (Arkansas State)

Legend

- (C) Team captain
- (S) Suspended
- (I) Ineligible
- (W) Walk-on
- Injured
- Current redshirt

Roster

== Schedule ==
Date time, TV	Rank^{#}	Opponent^{#}	Result	Record	Site (attendance) city, state
Non-conference regular season
Nov 9, 2018*; 11:00 am		at Louisiana Tech	W 69–58	1–0	Thomas Assembly Center (5,027); Shreveport, LA
Nov 14, 2018*; 6:30 pm		Florida Atlantic	W 61–38	2–0	Jack Stephens Center (842); Little Rock, AR
Nov 17, 2018*; 2:00 pm		Rice	L 65–79	2–1	Jack Stephens Center (818); Little Rock, AR
Nov 20, 2018*; 6:30 pm		No. 20 Texas A&M	L 41–60	2–2	Jack Stephens Center (1,228); Little Rock, AR
Nov 25, 2018*; 2:00 pm		at LSU	L 45–60	2–3	Maravich Center (1,629); Baton Rouge, LA
Nov 28, 2018*; 6:30 pm		No. 5 Mississippi State	L 63–98	2–4	Jack Stephens Center (2,261); Little Rock, AR
Dec 1, 2018*; 5:00 pm		Western Kentucky	L 56–68	2–5	Jack Stephens Center (1,777); Little Rock, AR
Dec 8, 2018*; 3:00 pm		Kansas State	L 47–53	2–6	Jack Stephens Center; Little Rock, AR
Dec 17, 2018*; 7:00 pm		at Tulsa	W 63–53	3–6	Reynolds Center (863); Tulsa, OK
Dec 21, 2018*; 11:00 am		at Memphis	W 63–60	4–6	Elma Roane Fieldhouse (376); Memphis, TN
Dec 30, 2018*; 2:00 pm, ESPN+		at Missouri State	L 44–48	4–7	JQH Arena (2,045); Springfield, MO
Sun Belt Conference regular season
Jan 3, 2019; 6:30 pm		Louisiana–Monroe	W 63–44	5–7 (1–0)	Jack Stephens Center (840); Little Rock, AR
Jan 5, 2019; 3:00 pm		Louisiana	W 62–48	6–7 (2–0)	Jack Stephens Center (935); Little Rock, AR
Jan 10, 2019; 6:00 pm		at Troy	L 66–71	6–8 (2–1)	Trojan Arena (1,876); Troy, AL
Jan 12, 2019; 3:00 pm, ESPN+		at South Alabama	W 65–42	7–8 (3–1)	Mitchell Center (391); Mobile, AL
Jan 17, 2019; 6:30 pm		Texas State	W 62–47	8–8 (4–1)	Jack Stephens Center (904); Little Rock, AR
Jan 19, 2019; 3:00 pm		UT Arlington	W 68–65	9–8 (5–1)	Jack Stephens Center (1,059); Little Rock, AR
Jan 24, 2019; 5:00 pm		at Coastal Carolina	W 60–47	10–8 (6–1)	HTC Center (547); Conway, SC
Jan 26, 2019; 1:00 pm, ESPN+		at Appalachian State	W 74–59	11–8 (7–1)	Holmes Center (358); Boone, NC
Feb 2, 2019; 3:00 pm, ESPN+		Arkansas State	W 68–55	13–8 (8–1)	Jack Stephens Center; Little Rock, AR
Feb 7, 2019; 6:30 pm, ESPN+		Troy	W 76–72	13–8 (9–1)	Jack Stephens Center (1,286); Little Rock, AR
Feb 9, 2019; 3:00 pm		South Alabama	W 47–44	14–8 (10–1)	Jack Stephens Center (1,227); Little Rock, AR
Feb 14, 2019; 7:00 pm		at UT Arlington	W 62–61	15–8 (11–1)	College Park Center (1,188); Arlington, TX
Feb 16, 2019; 2:00 pm, ESPN+		at Texas State	L 48–50	15–9 (11–2)	Strahan Arena (1,237); San Marcos, TX
Feb 23, 2019; 1:00 pm, ESPN+		at Arkansas State	L 58–62	15–10 (11–3)	First National Bank Arena (871); Jonesboro, AR
Feb 28, 2019; 11:30 am		Georgia Southern	W 80–51	16–10 (12–3)	Jack Stephens Center (1,627); Little Rock, AR
Mar 2, 2019; 2:00 pm, ESPN+		Georgia State	W 82–50	17–10 (13–3)	Jack Stephens Center (1,250); Little Rock, AR
Mar 7, 2019; 6:30 pm, ESPN+		at Louisiana	W 62–49	18–10 (14–3)	Cajundome (1,120); Lafayette, LA
Mar 9, 2019; 2:00 pm		at Louisiana–Monroe	W 57–38	19–10 (15–3)	Fant–Ewing Coliseum (893); Monroe, LA
Sun Belt Women's Tournament
Mar 15, 2019; 11:30 am, ESPN+	(1)	vs. (5) Appalachian State; Semifinals	W 80–64	20–10	Lakefront Arena; New Orleans, LA
Mar 16, 2019; 11:00 am, ESPN3	(1)	vs. (7) South Alabama; Championship Game	W 57–56	21–10	Lakefront Arena; New Orleans, LA
NCAA Women's Tournament
Mar 23, 2019*; 2:30 pm, ESPN2	(12 A)	vs. (5 A) No. 16 Gonzaga; First Round	L 51–68	21–11	Gill Coliseum; Corvallis, OR
*Non-conference game. ^{#}Rankings from AP Poll. (#) Tournament seedings in parentheses. A=Albany Region. All times are in Central Time.

== Rankings ==
2018–19 NCAA Division I women's basketball rankings

Regular season polls
Poll	Pre- Season	Week 2	Week 3	Week 4	Week 5	Week 6	Week 7	Week 8	Week 9	Week 10	Week 11	Week 12	Week 13	Week 14	Week 15	Week 16	Week 17	Week 18	Week 19	Final
AP																				N/A
Coaches																				

Legend
	Increase in ranking
	Decrease in ranking
	No change
(RV)	Received votes
(NR)	Not ranked

== See also ==
- 2018–19 Little Rock Trojans men's basketball team
