= 2018–19 Troy Trojans women's basketball team =

Intercollegiate basketball season

2018–19 Troy Trojans women's basketball

Lady Eagle Thanksgiving Classic Champions

WNIT, First Round
- Conference: Sun Belt Conference
- Record: 22–9 (12–6 Sun Belt)
- Head coach: Chanda Rigby (7th season)
- Assistant coaches: Jennifer Graf; Courtney Simmons; Neil Harrow
- Home arena: Trojan Arena

2018–19 Sun Belt Conference women's basketball standings
	Conf.				Overall
Team	W		L	PCT	W		L	PCT
UT Arlington	15	–	3	.833	24	–	8	.750
Little Rock †	15	–	3	.833	21	–	11	.656
Troy	13	–	5	.722	22	–	9	.710
Georgia State	11	–	7	.611	17	–	14	.548
Appalachian State	10	–	8	.556	22	–	14	.611
South Alabama	9	–	9	.500	25	–	11	.694
Texas State	9	–	9	.500	14	–	17	.452
Coastal Carolina	8	–	10	.444	17	–	15	.531
Arkansas State	7	–	11	.389	12	–	18	.400
Louisiana	5	–	13	.278	7	–	23	.233
Louisiana–Monroe	4	–	14	.222	10	–	19	.345
Georgia Southern	2	–	16	.111	7	–	22	.241
† 2019 Sun Belt tournament winner

The 2018–19 Troy Trojans women's basketball team represented Troy University during the 2018–19 NCAA Division I women's basketball season. The Trojans, led by sixth year head coach Chanda Rigby, played their home games at Trojan Arena and were members of the Sun Belt Conference. They finished the season 22–9, 13–5 in Sun Belt play to finish in third place. They lost in the quarterfinals of the Sun Belt Tournament to South Alabama. They received an at-large bid to the WNIT, where they lost to UAB in the first round.

== Preseason ==
=== Sun Belt coaches poll ===
On October 24, 2018, the Sun Belt released their preseason coaches poll with the Trojans predicted to finish in second place in the conference.

Predicted finish	Team	Votes (1st place)
1	Little Rock	133 (8)
2	Troy	131 (4)
3	Texas State	97
3	UT Arlington	97
5	Arkansas State	95
6	South Alabama	78
7	Louisiana	75
8	Coastal Carolina	72
9	Appalachian State	67
10	Georgia Southern	39
10	Georgia State	39
12	Louisiana–Monroe	13

=== Sun Belt Preseason All-Conference team ===
1st team

- Kayla Robinson – JR, Guard

2nd team

- Sky'Lynn Holmes – SR, Forward
- Amber Rivers – JR, Forward

== Roster ==
2018–19 Troy Trojans women's basketball team
Players
Coaches

Pos.	#	Name	Height	Year	Previous school	Hometown
G	1	Kayla Robinson	5 ft 5 in (1.65 m)	Jr	Effingham County HS	Clyo, GA
G	2	Shawnta Shaw	5 ft 2 in (1.57 m)	Fr	Pearl-Cohn Comprehensive HS	Nashville, TN
G	3	Tyra Johnson	5 ft 7 in (1.7 m)	Jr	Austin; Auburn/Chipola	Decatur, AL
G	4	Jasmine Robinson	5 ft 6 in (1.68 m)	So	Academy of Richmond County	Augusta, GA
G	10	Janiah Sandifer	5 ft 7 in (1.7 m)	So	Pearl-Cohn	Nashville, TN
G	11	Jasmine LeBlanc	5 ft 10 in (1.78 m)	RS Jr	Breaux Bridge HS; Louisiana Tech	Breaux Bridge, LA
G	12	Harriet Winchester	5 ft 11 in (1.8 m)	Jr	Keith HS	Safrord, AL
F	20	Japonica James	5 ft 11 in (1.8 m)	Jr	LaFlore HS; Tallahassee CC	Mobile, AL
G	21	Jasmine Sanders	6 ft 0 in (1.83 m)	So	Garinger HS	Charlotte, NC
F	22	Amahni Upshaw	6 ft 1 in (1.85 m)	Sr	Brantley HS	Brantley, AL
G	23	Shaterrika O'Neal	5 ft 8 in (1.73 m)	Sr	Winter Haven HS; Gulf Coast State	Winter Haven, FL
F	24	Sky'Lynn Holmes	6 ft 1 in (1.85 m)	Sr	Pine Tree HS; Tyler JC	Mount Pleasant, TX
F	32	Katie Rogers	6 ft 2 in (1.88 m)	Jr	Wenonah HS; Ole Miss	Birmingham, AL
F	40	Amber Rivers	6 ft 2 in (1.88 m)	Jr	Center Point HS	Birmingham, AL

Head coach

- Chanda Rigby (Southeastern Louisiana)

Assistant coach(es)

- Jennifer Graf (Northwestern State)
- Courtney Simmons (Louisville)
- Neil Harrow (East Central)

Legend

- (C) Team captain
- (S) Suspended
- (I) Ineligible
- (W) Walk-on
- Injured
- Current redshirt

Roster

== Schedule ==
Date time, TV	Rank^{#}	Opponent^{#}	Result	Record	Site (attendance) city, state
Exhibition
Nov 1, 2018*; 7:00 pm		West Florida	W 88–71		Trojan Arena (1,412); Troy, AL
Non-conference regular season
Nov 6, 2018*; 11:00 am, ACCNE		at Florida State	L 67–103	0–1	Donald L. Tucker Center (3,895); Tallahassee, FL
Nov 12, 2018*; 6:00 pm, ESPN+		Samford	W 72–52	1–1	Trojan Arena (1,403); Troy, AL
Nov 12, 2018*; 12:00 pm, ESPN+		Tennessee State	W 92–67	2–1	Trojan Arena (546); Troy, AL
Nov 19, 2018*; 10:00 am		at East Tennessee State	W 84–66	3–1	J. Madison Brooks Gymnasium (2,740); Johnson City, TN
Nov 23, 2018*; 4:00 pm		vs. Sam Houston State; Lady Eagle Thanksgiving Classic	W 84–79	4–1	Reed Green Coliseum (1,255); Hattiesburg, MS
Nov 24, 2018*; 2:00 pm		vs. Mississippi Valley State; Lady Eagle Thanksgiving Classic	W 75–54	5–1	Reed Green Coliseum (1,251); Hattiesburg, MS
Nov 29, 2018*; 5:00 pm, ESPN+		Alabama State	W 116–46	6–1	Trojan Arena (1,648); Troy, AL
Dec 4, 2018*; 6:00 pm, ESPN+		Middle Tennessee	L 64–67	6–2	Trojan Arena (989); Troy, AL
Dec 12, 2018*; 12:00 pm		Talladega	W 91–70	7–2	Trojan Arena (1,778); Troy, AL
Dec 19, 2018*; 6:00 pm		at Ole Miss	W 71–54	8–2	The Pavilion at Ole Miss (1,143); Oxford, MS
Dec 29, 2018*; 2:00 pm, ESPN+		at Jacksonville State	W 89–63	9–2	Pete Mathews Coliseum (465); Jacksonville, AL
Sun Belt regular season
Jan 3, 2019; 5:00 pm		at Coastal Carolina	W 82–81	10–2 (1–0)	HTC Center (175); Conway, SC
Jan 5, 2019; 1:00 pm		at Appalachian State	W 83–72	11–2 (2–0)	Holmes Center (361); Boone, SC
Jan 10, 2019; 6:00 pm, ESPN+		Little Rock	W 71–66	12–2 (3–0)	Trojan Arena (1,876); Troy, AL
Jan 12, 2019; 2:00 pm, ESPN+		Arkansas State	W 87–79	13–2 (4–0)	Trojan Arena (1,407); Troy, AL
Jan 17, 2019; 5:30 pm		at Georgia Southern	W 97–81	14–2 (5–0)	Hanner Fieldhouse (268); Statesboro, GA
Jan 19, 2019; 1:00 pm		at Georgia State	L 80–84	14–3 (5–1)	GSU Sports Arena (460); Atlanta, GA
Jan 24, 2019; 6:00 pm, ESPN+		Louisiana–Monroe	W 78–56	15–3 (6–1)	Trojan Arena (1,471); Troy, AL
Jan 26, 2019; 2:00 pm, ESPN+		Louisiana	W 90–64	16–3 (7–1)	Trojan Arena (921); Troy, AL
Feb 2, 2019; 2:00 pm, ESPN+		at South Alabama	L 77–80	16–4 (7–2)	Mitchell Center (4,469); Mobile, AL
Feb 7, 2019; 6:30 pm, ESPN+		at Little Rock	L 72–76	16–5 (7–3)	Jack Stephens Center (1,286); Little Rock, AR
Feb 9, 2019; 4:00 pm, ESPN+		at Arkansas State	W 100–89	17–5 (8–3)	First National Bank Arena (897); Jonesboro, AR
Feb 14, 2019; 6:00 pm		Georgia State	L 70–85	17–6 (8–4)	Trojan Arena (1,349); Troy, AL
Feb 16, 2019; 2:00 pm, ESPN+		Georgia Southern	W 100–78	18–6 (9–4)	Trojan Arena (1,112); Troy, AL
Feb 23, 2019; 2:00 pm, ESPN+		South Alabama	W 66–58	19–6 (10–4)	Trojan Arena (2,327); Troy, AL
Feb 28, 2019; 11:30 am, ESPN+		at Texas State	W 82–63	20–6 (11–4)	Strahan Arena (3,728); San Marcos, TX
Mar 2, 2019; 2:00 pm, ESPN+		at UT Arlington	L 65–88	20–7 (11–5)	College Park Center (1,112); Arlington, TX
Mar 7, 2019; 6:00 pm, ESPN+		Appalachian State	W 95–66	21–7 (12–5)	Trojan Arena (1,118); Troy, AL
Mar 9, 2019; 2:00 pm, ESPN+		Coastal Carolina	W 89–76	22–7 (13–5)	Trojan Arena (1,076); Troy, AL
Sun Belt Women's Tournament
Mar 14, 2019; 2:00 pm, ESPN+	(3)	vs. (7) South Alabama; Quarterfinals	L 74–87	22–8	Lakefront Arena; New Orleans, LA
WNIT
Mar 21, 2019*; 6:00 pm, ESPN+		UAB; First Round	L 89–93	22–9	Trojan Arena (2,451); Troy, AL
*Non-conference game. ^{#}Rankings from AP Poll. (#) Tournament seedings in parentheses. All times are in Central Time.

== Rankings ==
2018–19 NCAA Division I women's basketball rankings

+ Regular season polls	Poll	Pre- Season	Week 2	Week 3	Week 4	Week 5	Week 6	Week 7	Week 8	Week 9	Week 10	Week 11	Week 12	Week 13	Week 14	Week 15	Week 16	Week 17	Week 18	Week 19	Final
AP																				N/A	
Coaches		N/A										RV	RV								

Legend
	Increase in ranking
	Decrease in ranking
	No change
(RV)	Received votes
(NR)	Not ranked

== See also ==
- 2018–19 Troy Trojans men's basketball team
