= 2018–19 Appalachian State Mountaineers women's basketball team =

Intercollegiate basketball season

2018–19 Appalachian State Mountaineers women's basketball

WBI Champions
- Conference: Sun Belt Conference
- Record: 22–14 (10–8 Sun Belt)
- Head coach: Angel Elderkin (5th season)
- Assistant coaches: Kate Dempsey; Sam Pierce Jr.; Cristina Centeno
- Home arena: Holmes Center

2018–19 Sun Belt Conference women's basketball standings
| | Conf. | | | | Overall |
| Team | W | | L | PCT | W | | L | PCT |
|---|---|---|---|---|---|---|---|---|
| UT Arlington | 15 | – | 3 | .833 | 24 | – | 8 | .750 |
| Little Rock † | 15 | – | 3 | .833 | 21 | – | 11 | .656 |
| Troy | 13 | – | 5 | .722 | 22 | – | 9 | .710 |
| Georgia State | 11 | – | 7 | .611 | 17 | – | 14 | .548 |
| Appalachian State | 10 | – | 8 | .556 | 22 | – | 14 | .611 |
| South Alabama | 9 | – | 9 | .500 | 25 | – | 11 | .694 |
| Texas State | 9 | – | 9 | .500 | 14 | – | 17 | .452 |
| Coastal Carolina | 8 | – | 10 | .444 | 17 | – | 15 | .531 |
| Arkansas State | 7 | – | 11 | .389 | 12 | – | 18 | .400 |
| Louisiana | 5 | – | 13 | .278 | 7 | – | 23 | .233 |
| Louisiana–Monroe | 4 | – | 14 | .222 | 10 | – | 19 | .345 |
| Georgia Southern | 2 | – | 16 | .111 | 7 | – | 22 | .241 |
† 2019 Sun Belt tournament winner

The 2018–19 Appalachian State Mountaineers women's basketball team represented Appalachian State University in the 2018–19 NCAA Division I women's basketball season. The Mountaineers, led by fifth year head coach Angel Elderkin, played their home games at George M. Holmes Convocation Center and were members of the Sun Belt Conference. They finished the season 22–14, 10–8 in Sun Belt play to finish in fifth place. They advanced to the semifinals of the Sun Belt women's tournament where they lost to Little Rock. They received an invitation to the WBI where they defeated UNC Asheville, Marshall, Campbell and North Texas to win the WBI championship.

== Roster ==
2018–19 Appalachian State Mountaineers women's basketball team
Players
Coaches

| Pos. | # | Name | Height | Year | Previous school | Hometown |
|---|---|---|---|---|---|---|
| F | 1 | Maya Calder | 6 ft 0 in (1.83 m) | So | National Christian Academy | Landover, MD |
| F | 2 | A'Lea Gilbert | 6 ft 1 in (1.85 m) | Fr | South Mecklenburg | Charlotte, NC |
| G | 3 | Tierra Wilson | 5 ft 8 in (1.73 m) | So | RJ Reynolds | Winston-Salem, NC |
| G | 4 | Nicola Mathews | 5 ft 8 in (1.73 m) | Jr | Cabra Dominican; College of Central Florida | Adelaide, Australia |
| G | 5 | LaPresha Stanley | 5 ft 9 in (1.75 m) | So | Rockledge | Rockledge, FL |
| G | 10 | Kaila Craven | 5 ft 8 in (1.73 m) | RS Jr | Southwestern Randolph | Asheboro, NC |
| G/F | 14 | Armani Hampton | 5 ft 11 in (1.8 m) | Jr | Atkins | Winston-Salem, NC |
| F | 15 | Emma Newton | 5 ft 9 in (1.75 m) | Fr | Asheville Christian Academy | Asheville, NC |
| G | 20 | Brooke Bigott | 5 ft 10 in (1.78 m) | Fr | Seven Lakes | Katy, TX |
| G | 23 | Ashley Polacek | 5 ft 5 in (1.65 m) | RS Jr | SPIRE Institute; UCF | Ottawa, ON |
| G | 24 | Anna Perez Gomez | 5 ft 10 in (1.78 m) | Sr | CB Arenys; Eastern Wyoming College | Canet De Mar, Spain |
| F | 30 | Lainey Gosnell | 6 ft 1 in (1.85 m) | So | Habersham Central | Demorest, GA |
| F | 32 | Dominique Jeffery | 6 ft 1 in (1.85 m) | So | FAMU DRS | Tallahassee, FL |
| G | 34 | Madi Story | 5 ft 10 in (1.78 m) | RS Sr | Bandys | Maiden, NC |
| F/C | 42 | Bayley Plummer | 6 ft 2 in (1.88 m) | Jr | East Davidson | Thomasville, NC |
| F | 44 | Halie McDonald | 6 ft 2 in (1.88 m) | Fr | Millbrook | Winchester, VA |

Head coach

- Angel Elderkin (Southern Maine)

Assistant coach(es)

- Kate Dempsey (Wofford)
- Sam Pierce Jr. (Slippery Rock)
- Cristina Centeno (Siena)

Legend

- (C) Team captain
- (S) Suspended
- (I) Ineligible
- (W) Walk-on
- Injured
- Current redshirt

Roster

== Schedule ==
| Date time, TV | Rank^{#} | Opponent^{#} | Result | Record | Site (attendance) city, state |
Exhibition
| Nov 3, 2018*; 2:00 pm | | Lees–McRae | W 82–54 | | Holmes Center; Boone, NC |
Non-conference regular season
| Nov 9, 2018*; 7:00 pm | | at UAB | L 61–80 | 0–1 | Bartow Arena (301); Birmingham, AL |
| Nov 11, 2018*; 2:00 pm, ACCNE | | at Georgia Tech | L 53–71 | 0–2 | McCamish Pavilion (887); Atlanta, GA |
| Nov 15, 2018*; 6:30 pm | | UNC Greensboro | W 68–65 | 1–2 | Holmes Center (254); Boone, NC |
| Nov 17, 2018*; 7:00 pm, ESPN+ | | at Davidson | W 81–78 | 2–2 | John M. Belk Arena (587); Davidson, NC |
| Nov 20, 2018*; 6:30 pm, ESPN+ | | Elon | W 65–62 | 3–2 | Holmes Center (173); Boone, NC |
| Nov 25, 2018*; 2:00 pm | | Marshall | W 74–52 | 4–2 | Holmes Center (279); Boone, NC |
| Nov 29, 2018*; 7:00 pm | | at East Tennessee State | L 64–95 | 4–3 | J. Madison Brooks Gymnasium (839); Johnson City, TN |
| Dec 2, 2018*; 2:00 pm | | College of Charleston | W 80–66 | 5–3 | Holmes Center (367); Boone, NC |
| Dec 5, 2018*; 7:00 pm | | at No. 22 South Carolina | L 50–80 | 5–4 | Colonial Life Arena (10,380); Columbia, SC |
| Dec 17, 2018*; 6:30 pm | | Wofford | W 94–70 | 6–4 | Holmes Center (189); Boone, NC |
| Dec 21, 2018*; 7:00 pm, ACCNE | | at Clemson | L 48–87 | 6–5 | Littlejohn Coliseum (722); Clemson, SC |
Sun Belt regular season
| Jan 3, 2019; 6:30 pm | | South Alabama | W 71–63 | 7–5 (1–0) | Holmes Center (323); Boone, NC |
| Jan 5, 2019; 2:00 pm | | Troy | L 72–83 | 7–6 (1–1) | Holmes Center (361); Boone, NC |
| Jan 10, 2019; 8:00 pm, ESPN+ | | at UT Arlington | L 94–99 ^{2OT} | 7–7 (1–2) | College Park Center (836); Arlington, TX |
| Jan 12, 2019; 3:00 pm | | at Texas State | W 62–49 | 8–7 (2–2) | Strahan Arena (976); San Marcos, TX |
| Jan 19, 2019; 2:00 pm | | Coastal Carolina | W 67–53 | 9–7 (3–2) | Holmes Center (547); Boone, NC |
| Jan 24, 2019; 6:30 pm | | Arkansas State | W 75–67 | 10–7 (4–2) | Holmes Center (264); Boone, NC |
| Jan 26, 2019; 2:00 pm, ESPN+ | | Little Rock | L 59–74 | 10–8 (4–3) | Holmes Center (358); Boone, NC |
| Jan 31, 2019; 7:30 pm, ESPN+ | | at Louisiana | L 55–73 | 10–9 (4–4) | Cajundome (1,091); Lafayette, LA |
| Feb 2, 2019; 3:00 pm | | at Louisiana–Monroe | W 80–58 | 11–9 (5–4) | Fant–Ewing Coliseum (1,117); Monroe, LA |
| Feb 7, 2019; 12:00 pm, ESPN+ | | Texas State | W 77–56 | 12–9 (6–4) | Holmes Center (840); Boone, NC |
| Feb 9, 2019; 2:00 pm | | UT Arlington | L 65–72 | 12–10 (6–5) | Holmes Center (774); Boone, NC |
| Feb 16, 2019; 2:00 pm, ESPN+ | | at Coastal Carolina | L 66–74 | 12–11 (6–6) | HTC Center (269); Conway, SC |
| Feb 21, 2019; 6:00 pm, ESPN+ | | at Georgia State | L 75–85 | 12–12 (6–7) | GSU Sports Arena (779); Atlanta, GA |
| Feb 23, 2019; 2:00 pm | | at Georgia Southern | W 70–52 | 13–12 (7–7) | Hanner Fieldhouse (212); Statesboro, GA |
| Feb 28, 2019; 6:30 pm | | Louisiana–Monroe | W 56–51 | 14–12 (8–7) | Holmes Center (723); Boone, NC |
| Mar 2, 2019; 2:00 pm | | Louisiana | W 83–69 | 15–12 (9–7) | Holmes Center (617); Boone, NC |
| Mar 7, 2019; 7:00 pm, ESPN+ | | at Troy | L 66–95 | 15–13 (9–8) | Trojan Arena (1,118); Troy, AL |
| Mar 9, 2019; 5:00 pm, ESPN+ | | at South Alabama | W 59–50 | 16–13 (10–8) | Mitchell Center (382); Mobile, AL |
Sun Belt Women's Tournament
| Mar 13, 2019; 12:30 pm, ESPN+ | (5) | vs. (9) Coastal Carolina; Second Round | W 78–42 | 17–13 | Lakefront Arena; New Orleans, LA |
| Mar 14, 2019; 12:30 pm, ESPN+ | (5) | vs. (4) Georgia State; Quarterfinals | W 47–45 | 18–13 | Lakefront Arena; New Orleans, LA |
| Mar 15, 2019; 12:30 pm, ESPN+ | (5) | vs. (1) Little Rock; Semifinals | L 64–80 | 18–14 | Lakefront Arena; New Orleans, LA |
WBI
| Mar 20, 2019*; 6:00 pm, ESPN+ | | at UNC Asheville; First Round | W 57–55 | 19–14 | Kimmel Arena (423); Asheville, NC |
| Mar 25, 2019*; 6:30 pm, ESPN+ | | Marshall; Quarterfinals | W 83–71 | 20–14 | Holmes Center (937); Boone, NC |
| Mar 30, 2019*; 7:00 pm, ESPN+ | | Campbell; Semifinals | W 70–57 | 21–14 | Holmes Center (1,293); Boone, NC |
| Apr 3, 2019*; 6:30 pm, ESPN+ | | North Texas; Championship Game | W 76–59 | 22–14 | Holmes Center (1,823); Boone, NC |
*Non-conference game. ^{#}Rankings from AP Poll. (#) Tournament seedings in parentheses. All times are in Eastern Time.

== See also ==
- 2018–19 Appalachian State Mountaineers men's basketball team
