= 2018–19 Coastal Carolina Chanticleers women's basketball team =

Intercollegiate basketball season

2018–19 Coastal Carolina Chanticleers women's basketball

WBI, First Round
- Conference: Sun Belt Conference
- Record: 17–15 (8–10 Sun Belt)
- Head coach: Jaida Williams (6th season)
- Assistant coaches: Vanessa Taylor; Latisha Luckett; AJ Jordan
- Home arena: HTC Center

2018–19 Sun Belt Conference women's basketball standings
	Conf.				Overall
Team	W		L	PCT	W		L	PCT
UT Arlington	15	–	3	.833	24	–	8	.750
Little Rock †	15	–	3	.833	21	–	11	.656
Troy	13	–	5	.722	22	–	9	.710
Georgia State	11	–	7	.611	17	–	14	.548
Appalachian State	10	–	8	.556	22	–	14	.611
South Alabama	9	–	9	.500	25	–	11	.694
Texas State	9	–	9	.500	14	–	17	.452
Coastal Carolina	8	–	10	.444	17	–	15	.531
Arkansas State	7	–	11	.389	12	–	18	.400
Louisiana	5	–	13	.278	7	–	23	.233
Louisiana–Monroe	4	–	14	.222	10	–	19	.345
Georgia Southern	2	–	16	.111	7	–	22	.241
† 2019 Sun Belt tournament winner

The 2018–19 Coastal Carolina Chanticleers women's basketball team represented Coastal Carolina University in the 2018–19 NCAA Division I women's basketball season. The Chanticleers, led by sixth year head coach Jaida Williams, played their home games at HTC Center and were members of the Sun Belt Conference. They finished the season 17–15, 8–10 in Sun Belt play to finish in eighth place. They advanced to the second round of the Sun Belt women's tournament, where they lost to Appalachian State. They received an invitation to the WBI, where they lost to Campbell in the first round.

== Roster ==
2018–19 Coastal Carolina Chanticleers women's basketball team
Players
Coaches

Pos.	#	Name	Height	Year	Previous school	Hometown
G	1	Mery Visone	5 ft 8 in (1.73 m)	So	IMG Academy	Naples, Italy
G	2	Breelyn Blanding	5 ft 9 in (1.75 m)	Sr	Ridgeview HS	Columbia, SC
G	3	Torrie Cash	5 ft 6 in (1.68 m)	Jr	Vincentian Academy; Monroe CC	Pittsburgh, PA
G	4	Tiarra Davis	5 ft 6 in (1.68 m)	So	Holy Names Catholic	Windsor, ON
G	11	Kiara Norman	5 ft 4 in (1.63 m)	So	Norfolk Christian	Virginia Beach, VA
G	14	Kaylin West	5 ft 7 in (1.7 m)	So	IMG Academy	Bethlehem, PA
F	20	Janae Camp	6 ft 1 in (1.85 m)	So	TPLS Academy	Portsmouth, VA
C	21	Aja Blount	5 ft 11 in (1.8 m)	Fr	IMG Academy	Northampton, PA
G	23	Caitlin Roche	5 ft 8 in (1.73 m)	Jr	IHA Academy; ASA College/Robert Morris	Northampton, PA
F	25	Isiuwa Oghagbon	5 ft 11 in (1.8 m)	So	Mercersburg Academy	Haymarket, VA
C	30	Naheria Hamilton	6 ft 4 in (1.93 m)	Jr	Eastern Wayne HS	Goldsboro, NC
G	32	DJ Williams	5 ft 10 in (1.78 m)	Jr	JW North HS	Moreno Valley, CA
F	40	Jamie Williams	6 ft 4 in (1.93 m)	Sr	Coral Springs Charter	Coral Springs, FL
F	54	Alise Davis	5 ft 11 in (1.8 m)	So	Tampa Catholic	Tampa, FL

Head coach

- Jaida Williams (Cal Poly Pomona)

Assistant coach(es)

- Vanessa Taylor (Tuskegee)
- AJ Jordan (Coastal Carolina)
- Latisha Luckett (Central Michigan)

Legend

- (C) Team captain
- (S) Suspended
- (I) Ineligible
- (W) Walk-on
- Injured
- Current redshirt

Roster

== Schedule ==
Date time, TV	Rank^{#}	Opponent^{#}	Result	Record	Site (attendance) city, state
Non-conference regular season
Nov 6, 2018*; 5:00 pm		Western Carolina	W 77–59	1–0	HTC Center (278); Conway, SC
Nov 13, 2018*; 6:00 pm		South Carolina State	W 57–44	2–0	HTC Center (433); Conway, SC
Nov 18, 2018*; 5:00 pm		at UC Riverside	L 43–62	2–1	SRC Arena (98); Riverside, CA
Nov 23, 2018*; 2:00 pm		Bowling Green; Coastal Carolina Thanksgiving Classic	W 81–80	3–1	HTC Center (247); Conway, SC
Nov 25, 2018*; 2:00 pm		Memphis; Coastal Carolina Thanksgiving Classic	W 90–71	4–1	HTC Center (287); Conway, SC
Dec 1, 2018*; 2:00 pm		at North Carolina Central	W 89–66	5–1	McDougald–McLendon Arena (641); Durham, NC
Dec 5, 2018*; 5:00 pm		Meredith	W 128–39	6–1	HTC Center (348); Conway, SC
Dec 8, 2018*; 2:00 pm		North Carolina Wesleyan	W 126–65	7–1	HTC Center (237); Conway, SC
Dec 18, 2018*; 6:30 pm		vs. Auburn; Carolinas Challenge	L 78–84	7–2	Myrtle Beach Convention Center; Myrtle Beach, SC
Dec 20, 2018*; 8:30 pm		vs. Rice; Carolinas Challenge	L 52–56	7–3	Myrtle Beach Convention Center; Myrtle Beach, SC
Dec 29, 2018*; 2:00 pm		at UNC Greensboro	W 78–71	8–3	Fleming Gymnasium (197); Greensboro, NC
Sun Belt regular season
Jan 3, 2019; 6:00 pm		Troy	L 81–82	8–4 (0–1)	HTC Center (175); Conway, SC
Jan 5, 2019; 2:00 pm		South Alabama	L 78–88	8–5 (0–2)	HTC Center (224); Conway, SC
Jan 10, 2019; 8:00 pm		at Texas State	L 58–73	8–6 (0–3)	Strahan Arena (964); San Marcos, TX
Jan 12, 2019; 3:00 pm		at UT Arlington	L 53–79	8–7 (0–4)	College Park Center (738); Arlington, TX
Jan 19, 2019; 2:00 pm		at Appalachian State	L 53–67	8–8 (0–5)	Holmes Center (547); Boone, NC
Jan 24, 2019; 6:00 pm		Little Rock	L 47–60	8–9 (0–6)	HTC Center (547); Conway, SC
Jan 26, 2019; 2:00 pm		Arkansas State	W 88–72	9–9 (1–6)	HTC Center (313); Boone, NC
Jan 31, 2019; 7:30 pm, ESPN+		at Louisiana–Monroe	W 79–54	10–9 (2–6)	Fant–Ewing Coliseum (1,271); Monroe, LA
Feb 2, 2019; 3:00 pm, ESPN+		at Louisiana	W 76–58	11–9 (3–6)	Cajundome (1,067); Lafayette, LA
Feb 7, 2019; 6:00 pm		UT Arlington	L 64–67	11–10 (3–7)	HTC Center (238); Conway, SC
Feb 9, 2019; 2:00 pm		Texas State	W 77–70	12–10 (4–7)	HTC Center (316); Conway, SC
Feb 16, 2019; 2:00 pm, ESPN+		Appalachian State	W 74–66	13–10 (5–7)	HTC Center (269); Conway, SC
Feb 21, 2019; 6:30 pm, ESPN+		at Georgia Southern	W 76–73	14–10 (6–7)	Hanner Fieldhouse (187); Statesboro, GA
Feb 23, 2019; 2:00 pm, ESPN+		at Georgia State	W 67–62	15–10 (7–7)	GSU Sports Arena (682); Atlanta, GA
Feb 28, 2019; 6:00 pm, ESPN+		Louisiana	W 67–62	16–10 (8–7)	HTC Center (242); Conway, SC
Mar 2, 2019; 2:00 pm, ESPN+		Louisiana–Monroe	L 57–60	16–11 (8–8)	HTC Center (356); Conway, SC
Mar 7, 2019; 8:00 pm, ESPN+		at South Alabama	L 50–67	16–12 (8–9)	Mitchell Center (376); Mobile, AL
Mar 9, 2019; 3:00 pm, ESPN+		at Troy	L 76–89	16–13 (8–10)	Trojan Arena (1,076); Troy, AL
Sun Belt Women's Tournament
Mar 11, 2019; 6:00 pm, ESPN+	(8)	(9) Arkansas State; First Round	W 73–61	17–13	HTC Center (197); Conway, AL
Mar 13, 2019; 12:30 pm, ESPN+	(8)	vs. (5) Appalachian State; Second Round	L 42–78	17–14	Lakefront Arena; New Orleans, LA
WBI
Mar 21, 2019*; 6:00 pm, ESPN+		Campbell; First Round	L 54–58	17–15	HTC Center (139); Conway, SC
*Non-conference game. ^{#}Rankings from AP Poll. (#) Tournament seedings in parentheses. All times are in Eastern Time.

== See also ==
- 2018–19 Coastal Carolina Chanticleers men's basketball team
