= 2018–19 Texas State Bobcats women's basketball team =

Intercollegiate basketball season

2018–19 Texas State Bobcats women's basketball
- Conference: Sun Belt Conference
- Record: 14–17 (9–9 Sun Belt)
- Head coach: Zenarae Antoine (7th season)
- Assistant coaches: Chandra Dorsey; Nate Teymer; Paige Love
- Home arena: Strahan Coliseum

2018–19 Sun Belt Conference women's basketball standings
	Conf.				Overall
Team	W		L	PCT	W		L	PCT
UT Arlington	15	–	3	.833	24	–	8	.750
Little Rock †	15	–	3	.833	21	–	11	.656
Troy	13	–	5	.722	22	–	9	.710
Georgia State	11	–	7	.611	17	–	14	.548
Appalachian State	10	–	8	.556	22	–	14	.611
South Alabama	9	–	9	.500	25	–	11	.694
Texas State	9	–	9	.500	14	–	17	.452
Coastal Carolina	8	–	10	.444	17	–	15	.531
Arkansas State	7	–	11	.389	12	–	18	.400
Louisiana	5	–	13	.278	7	–	23	.233
Louisiana–Monroe	4	–	14	.222	10	–	19	.345
Georgia Southern	2	–	16	.111	7	–	22	.241
† 2019 Sun Belt tournament winner

The 2018–19 Texas State Bobcats women's basketball team represented Texas State University in the 2018–19 NCAA Division I women's basketball season. The Bobcats, led by seventh year head coach Zenarae Antoine, played their home games at Strahan Coliseum and were members of the Sun Belt Conference. They finished the season 14–17, 9–9 in Sun Belt play to finish in a tie for sixth place. They lost in the second round of the Sun Belt women's tournament to South Alabama.

== Roster ==
2018–19 Texas State Bobcats women's basketball team
Players
Coaches

Pos.	#	Name	Height	Year	Previous school	Hometown
F	0	Jayla Johnson	6 ft 1 in (1.85 m)	So	Lincoln HS	Dallas, TX
G	1	Avionne Alexander	5 ft 8 in (1.73 m)	So	Sunnyvale HS	Sunnyvale, TX
G	2	Toshua Leavitt	5 ft 4 in (1.63 m)	Sr	Nixa HS	Nixa, MO
G	3	Kennedy Taylor	5 ft 3 in (1.6 m)	Fr	Lincoln HS	Dallas, TX
G	12	Dabrasia Baty	5 ft 6 in (1.68 m)	Sr	Bryan Adams HS; South Plains	Dallas, TX
F	13	Zandra Emanuel	6 ft 0 in (1.83 m)	RS Sr	C.E. King HS; Coastal Bend College	Houston, TX
G	15	Ja'Kayla Bowie	5 ft 8 in (1.73 m)	Fr	Robert E. Lee HS	Tyler, TX
F	22	Jazza Johns	6 ft 0 in (1.83 m)	Jr	Johnsburg HS; Iowa Western	McHenry, IL
F	32	Da'Nasia Hood	6 ft 1 in (1.85 m)	Fr	Wagner HS	San Antonio, TX
G	33	Bailey Holle	5 ft 7 in (1.7 m)	Jr	Westlake HS	Austin, TX
C	55	Jaeda Reed	6 ft 1 in (1.85 m)	Fr	Eisenhower HS	Lawton, OK

Head coach

- Zenarae Antoine (Colorado State)

Assistant coach(es)

- Chandra Dorsey (Mississippi)
- Nate Teymer (Grand View)
- Paige Love (UNC Asheville)

Legend

- (C) Team captain
- (S) Suspended
- (I) Ineligible
- (W) Walk-on
- Injured
- Current redshirt

Roster

== Schedule ==
Date time, TV	Rank^{#}	Opponent^{#}	Result	Record	Site (attendance) city, state
Non-conference regular season
Nov 9, 2018*; 8:00 pm		at New Mexico; Preseason WNIT First Round	L 51–82	0–1	Dreamstyle Arena (4,585); Albuquerque, NM
Nov 16, 2018*; 6:30 pm		Nicholls; Preseason WNIT consolation round	W 72–65	1–1	Strahan Arena (625); San Marcos, TX
Nov 17, 2018*; 6:30 pm		Montana State; Preseason WNIT consolation round	L 59–67	1–2	Strahan Arena (532); San Marcos, TX
Nov 20, 2018*; 7:00 pm		at UTSA; I-35 Rivalry	W 68–60	2–2	Convocation Center (538); San Antonio, TX
Nov 24, 2018*; 7:00 pm		Oral Roberts	L 64–81	2–3	Strahan Arena (978); San Marcos, TX
Nov 26, 2018*; 7:00 pm		at Texas A&M–Corpus Christi	W 60–53	3–3	Dugan Wellness Center (609); Corpus Christi, TX
Nov 30, 2018*; 7:00 pm		at Oklahoma State	L 55–66	3–4	Gallagher-Iba Arena (1,657); Stillwater, OK
Dec 4, 2018*; 7:00 pm		St. Thomas (TX)	W 92–39	4–4	Strahan Arena (1,138); San Marcos, TX
Dec 17, 2018*; 7:00 pm		at Missouri	L 50–69	4–5	Mizzou Arena (3,518); Columbia, MO
Dec 21, 2018*; 3:00 pm		vs. Saint Mary's; Tulane Classic semifinals	L 62–89	4–6	Devlin Fieldhouse (768); New Orleans, LA
Dec 22, 2018*; 12:00 pm		at Tulane; Tulane Classic 3rd place game	L 61–67 ^{OT}	4–7	Devlin Fieldhouse (751); New Orleans, LA
Dec 31, 2018*; 5:00 pm		Texas A&M International	W 92–25	5–7	Strahan Arena (1,073); San Marcos, TX
Sun Belt regular season
Jan 3, 2019; 5:30 pm		at Georgia Southern	W 64–52	6–7 (1–0)	Hanner Fieldhouse (207); Statesboro, GA
Jan 5, 2019; 1:00 pm, ESPN+		at Georgia State	W 69–60	7–7 (2–0)	GSU Sports Arena (6350); Atlanta, GA
Jan 10, 2019; 7:00 pm, ESPN+		Coastal Carolina	W 73–58	8–7 (3–0)	Strahan Arena (964); San Marcos, TX
Jan 12, 2019; 2:00 pm, ESPN+		Appalachian State	L 49–62	8–8 (3–1)	Strahan Arena (976); San Marcos, TX
Jan 17, 2019; 6:30 pm, ESPN+		at Little Rock	L 47–62	8–9 (3–2)	Jack Stephens Center (904); Little Rock, AR
Jan 19, 2019; 4:00 pm, ESPN+		at Arkansas State	W 85–62	9–9 (4–2)	First National Bank Arena (611); Jonesboro, AR
Jan 24, 2019; 7:00 pm, ESPN+		Georgia State	L 34–57	9–10 (4–3)	Strahan Arena (1,033); San Marcos, TX
Jan 26, 2019; 2:00 pm, ESPN+		Georgia Southern	L 55–65	9–11 (4–4)	Strahan Arena (1,437); San Marcos, TX
Feb 2, 2019; 2:00 pm, ESPN+		at UT Arlington	L 53–68	8–10 (4–5)	College Park Center (1,177); Arlington, TX
Feb 7, 2019; 11:00 am, ESPN+		at Appalachian State	L 56–77	9–13 (4–6)	Holmes Center (840); Boone, NC
Feb 9, 2019; 1:00 pm		at Coastal Carolina	L 70–77	9–14 (4–7)	HTC Center (350); Conway, SC
Feb 14, 2019; 7:00 pm		Arkansas State	W 68–54	10–14 (5–7)	Strahan Arena (1,026); San Marcos, TX
Feb 16, 2019; 2:00 pm, ESPN+		Little Rock	W 50–48	11–14 (6–8)	Strahan Arena (1,237); San Marcos, TX
Feb 21, 2019; 6:30 pm, ESPN+		at Louisiana–Monroe	W 62–51	12–14 (7–8)	Fant–Ewing Coliseum (899); Monroe, LA
Feb 23, 2019; 2:00 pm, ESPN+		at Louisiana	W 71–65	13–14 (8–8)	Cajundome (916); Lafayette, LA
Feb 28, 2019; 11:30 am, ESPN+		Troy	L 63–82	13–15 (8–9)	Strahan Arena (3,728); San Marcos, TX
Mar 9, 2019; 2:00 pm, ESPN+		UT Arlington	L 41–44	14–16 (9–9)	Strahan Arena (1,225); San Marcos, TX
Sun Belt Women's Tournament
Mar 13, 2019; 2:00 pm, ESPN+	(6)	vs. (7) South Alabama; Second Round	L 67–68	14–17	Lakefront Arena; New Orleans, LA
*Non-conference game. ^{#}Rankings from AP Poll. (#) Tournament seedings in parentheses. All times are in Eastern Time.

== See also ==
- 2018–19 Texas State Bobcats men's basketball team
