= 2018–19 UT Arlington Mavericks women's basketball team =

Intercollegiate basketball season

2018–19 UT Arlington Mavericks women's basketball

Sun Belt regular-season co-champions

WNIT, second round
- Conference: Sun Belt Conference
- Record: 24–8 (15–3 Sun Belt)
- Head coach: Krista Gerlich (6th season)
- Associate head coach: Talby Justus
- Assistant coaches: Ashley Crawford; Jordan Vessels
- Home arena: College Park Center

2018–19 Sun Belt Conference women's basketball standings
	Conf.				Overall
Team	W		L	PCT	W		L	PCT
UT Arlington	15	–	3	.833	24	–	8	.750
Little Rock †	15	–	3	.833	21	–	11	.656
Troy	13	–	5	.722	22	–	9	.710
Georgia State	11	–	7	.611	17	–	14	.548
Appalachian State	10	–	8	.556	22	–	14	.611
South Alabama	9	–	9	.500	25	–	11	.694
Texas State	9	–	9	.500	14	–	17	.452
Coastal Carolina	8	–	10	.444	17	–	15	.531
Arkansas State	7	–	11	.389	12	–	18	.400
Louisiana	5	–	13	.278	7	–	23	.233
Louisiana–Monroe	4	–	14	.222	10	–	19	.345
Georgia Southern	2	–	16	.111	7	–	22	.241
† 2019 Sun Belt tournament winner

The 2018–19 UT Arlington Mavericks women's basketball team represented the University of Texas at Arlington in the 2018–19 NCAA Division I women's basketball season. The Mavericks, led by sixth-year head coach Krista Gerlich, played their home games at the College Park Center in Arlington, Texas and were members of the Sun Belt Conference. They finished the season 24–8, 15–3 in Sun Belt play, to share the Sun Belt regular-season title with Little Rock. The Mavericks lost in the semifinals of the Sun Belt women's tournament to South Alabama. They received an automatic bid to the WNIT, where they defeated Stephen F. Austin in the first round before losing to TCU in the second round.

== Roster ==
2018–19 Texas–Arlington Mavericks women's basketball team
Players
Coaches

Pos.	#	Name	Height	Year	Previous school	Hometown
G	0	Cierra Johnson	5 ft 9 in (1.75 m)	RS Sr	L D Bell	Bedford, TX
G	1	Laurynn McGowen	5 ft 6 in (1.68 m)	Sr	Seguin; New Mexico JC	Arlington, TX
G	2	Lauren Billie	5 ft 6 in (1.68 m)	Sr	East Central	Tulsa, OK
C	3	Misty Dossey	6 ft 5 in (1.96 m)	Fr	Comanche	Comanche, OK
G	12	Brooke Alexander	6 ft 0 in (1.83 m)	RS Jr	Prestonwood Christian Academy; Liberty	Frisco, TX
F	13	Daiane Machado	6 ft 1 in (1.85 m)	Sr	New Mexico JC	Curitiba, Brazil
G	20	Claire Chastain	6 ft 0 in (1.83 m)	Fr	Dale	Shawnee, OK
G	21	Terryn Milton	5 ft 9 in (1.75 m)	Fr	Owasso High School	Owasso, OK
G	23	Camryn Hawkins	5 ft 10 in (1.78 m)	Fr	Rio Rancho	Albuquerque, NM
G	24	Aysia Evans	5 ft 6 in (1.68 m)	Jr	Broken Arrow	Tulsa, OK
F	30	Bre Wickware (redshirt)	6 ft 2 in (1.88 m)	Jr	Guyer; Indiana	Denton, TX
F	33	Kelsey Johnson	6 ft 3 in (1.91 m)	RS So	Washington	Washington, OK
C	40	Michaela Wright	6 ft 5 in (1.96 m)	So	Father Tolton Catholic	Columbia, MO
G	41	Katie Ferrell	6 ft 1 in (1.85 m)	Fr	Plano	Plano, TX
F	45	Emma Halverson	6 ft 3 in (1.91 m)	Fr	Plano	Plano, TX

Head coach

- Krista Gerlich (Texas Tech)

Assistant coach(es)

- Talby Justus (Tabor)
- Ashley Crawford (Lamar)
- Jordan Vessels (West Texas A&M)

Legend

- (C) Team captain
- (S) Suspended
- (I) Ineligible
- (W) Walk-on
- Injured
- Current redshirt

Roster
Last update: March 31, 2025

== Schedule ==
Date time, TV	Rank^{#}	Opponent^{#}	Result	Record	Site (attendance) city, state
Non-conference regular season
November 10, 2018*; 2:30 p.m., ESPN+		Jackson State	W 99–63	1–0	College Park Center (1,063); Arlington, TX
November 14, 2018*; 7:00 p.m., ESPN+		Arkansas	L 65–66	1–1	College Park Center (1,081); Arlington, TX
November 20, 2018*; 7:00 p.m., ESPN+		Grambling State	W 78–54	2–1	College Park Center (852); Arlington, TX
November 23, 2018*; 7:00 p.m.		at Fresno State	L 61–70	2–2	Save Mart Center (1,958); Fresno, CA
November 25, 2018*; 4:00 p.m.		at San Francisco	W 80–73	3–2	War Memorial Gymnasium (235); San Francisco, CA
December 2, 2018*; 2:00 p.m.		at Incarnate Word	W 97–49	4–2	McDermott Convocation Center (349); San Antonio, TX
December 6, 2018*; 7:00 p.m.		at Oral Roberts	W 80–62	5–2	Mabee Center (1,245); Tulsa, OK
December 17, 2018*; 7:00 p.m.		at Houston	W 65–61 ^{OT}	5–2	Fertitta Center (831); Houston, TX
December 20, 2018*; 2:00 p.m., ESPN+		UTSA	W 53–48	6–2	College Park Center (694); Arlington, TX
December 22, 2018*; 2:00 p.m., ESPN+		USC	L 61–73	6–3	College Park Center (844); Arlington, TX
December 29, 2018*; 7:00 p.m.		at SMU	W 66–41	7–3	Moody Coliseum (843); Dallas, TX
Sun Belt regular season
January 3, 2019; 5:00 p.m., ESPN+		at Georgia State	L 48–50	7–4 (0–1)	GSU Sports Arena (376); Atlanta, GA
January 5, 2019; 1:00 p.m., ESPN+		at Georgia Southern	W 74–53	8–4 (1–1)	Hanner Fieldhouse (220); Statesboro, GA
January 10, 2019; 7:00 p.m., ESPN+		Appalachian State	W 99–94 ^{2OT}	9–4 (2–1)	College Park Center (836); Arlington, TX
January 12, 2019; 2:00 p.m., ESPN+		Coastal Carolina	W 79–53	10–4 (3–1)	College Park Center (738); Arlington, TX
January 17, 2019; 7:00 p.m., ESPN+		at Arkansas State	W 100–73	11–4 (4–1)	First National Bank Arena (621); Jonesboro, AR
January 19, 2019; 3:00 p.m.		at Little Rock	L 65–68	11–5 (4–2)	Jack Stephens Center (1,059); Little Rock, AR
January 24, 2019; 11:30 p.m., ESPN+		Georgia Southern	W 81–48	12–5 (5–2)	College Park Center (6,186); Arlington, TX
January 26, 2019; 2:00 p.m., ESPN+		Georgia State	W 69–45	13–5 (6–2)	College Park Center (1,107); Arlington, TX
January 29, 2019; 3:00 p.m., ESPN+		at Louisiana	W 76–61	14–5 (7–2)	Cajundome (1,084); Lafayette, LA
February 2, 2019; 2:00 p.m., ESPN+		Texas State	W 68–53	15–5 (8–2)	College Park Center (1,177); Arlington, TX
February 7, 2019; 5:00 p.m.		at Coastal Carolina	W 67–64	16–5 (9–2)	HTC Center (238); Conway, SC
February 9, 2019; 1:00 p.m.		at Appalachian State	W 72–65	17–5 (10–2)	Holmes Center (774); Boone, NC
February 14, 2019; 7:00 p.m., ESPN+		Little Rock	L 61–62	17–6 (10–3)	College Park Center (1,188); Arlington, TX
February 16, 2019; 2:00 p.m., ESPN+		Arkansas State	W 67–62	18–6 (11–3)	College Park Center (1,014); Arlington, TX
February 23, 2019; 2:00 p.m., ESPN+		at Louisiana–Monroe	W 60–56 ^{OT}	19–6 (12–3)	Fant–Ewing Coliseum (1,000); Monroe, LA
February 28, 2019; 7:00 p.m., ESPN+		South Alabama	W 72–51	20–6 (13–3)	College Park Center (1,139); Arlington, TX
March 2, 2019; 2:00 p.m., ESPN+		Troy	W 88–65	21–6 (14–3)	College Park Center (1,112); Arlington, TX
March 9, 2019; 2:00 p.m.		at Texas State	W 44–41	24–6 (15–3)	Strahan Arena (1,225); San Marcos, TX
Sun Belt women's tournament
March 15, 2019; 2:00 p.m., ESPN+	(2)	vs. (7) South Alabama; Semifinals	L 50–57	24–7	Lakefront Arena; New Orleans, LA
WNIT
March 21, 2019*; 7:00 p.m., ESPN+		Stephen F. Austin; First round	W 60–54	25–7	College Park Center (1,159); Arlington, TX
March 23, 2019*; 2:00 p.m.		at TCU; Second round	L 54–71	25–8	Schollmaier Arena (1,531); Fort Worth, TX
*Non-conference game. ^{#}Rankings from AP poll. (#) Tournament seedings in parentheses. All times are in Central.

== Rankings ==
Regular-season polls
Poll	Pre- season	Week 2	Week 3	Week 4	Week 5	Week 6	Week 7	Week 8	Week 9	Week 10	Week 11	Week 12	Week 13	Week 14	Week 15	Week 16	Week 17	Week 18	Week 19	Final
AP																				N/A
Coaches		N/A																		

Legend
	Increase in ranking
	Decrease in ranking
	No change
(RV)	Received votes
(NR)	Not ranked previous week

== See also ==
- 2018–19 UT Arlington Mavericks men's basketball team
