= 2018–19 Georgia Southern Eagles women's basketball team =

Intercollegiate basketball season

2018–19 Georgia Southern Eagles women's basketball
- Conference: Sun Belt Conference
- Record: 7–22 (2–16 Sun Belt)
- Head coach: Kip Drown (4th season)
- Assistant coaches: Lisa Jackson; Alex Stewart; Toby Wagoner
- Home arena: Hanner Fieldhouse

2018–19 Sun Belt Conference women's basketball standings
	Conf.				Overall
Team	W		L	PCT	W		L	PCT
UT Arlington	15	–	3	.833	24	–	8	.750
Little Rock †	15	–	3	.833	21	–	11	.656
Troy	13	–	5	.722	22	–	9	.710
Georgia State	11	–	7	.611	17	–	14	.548
Appalachian State	10	–	8	.556	22	–	14	.611
South Alabama	9	–	9	.500	25	–	11	.694
Texas State	9	–	9	.500	14	–	17	.452
Coastal Carolina	8	–	10	.444	17	–	15	.531
Arkansas State	7	–	11	.389	12	–	18	.400
Louisiana	5	–	13	.278	7	–	23	.233
Louisiana–Monroe	4	–	14	.222	10	–	19	.345
Georgia Southern	2	–	16	.111	7	–	22	.241
† 2019 Sun Belt tournament winner

The 2018–19 Georgia Southern Eagles women's basketball team represented Georgia Southern University in the 2018–19 NCAA Division I women's basketball season. The Eagles, led by fourth year head coach Kip Drown, played their home games at Hanner Fieldhouse and were members of the Sun Belt Conference. They finished the season 7–22, 2–16 in Sun Belt play to finish in last place. They failed to qualify for the Sun Belt women's tournament.

On March 10, head coach Kip Drown's contract was not renewed. He finished with a four-year record at Georgia Southern of 32–86. On March 27, the school hired Anita Howard from Division II Columbus State University as a head coach.

== Roster ==
2018–19 Georgia Southern Eagles women's basketball team
Players
Coaches

Pos.	#	Name	Height	Year	Previous school	Hometown
G	1	Jordan Strange	5 ft 7 in (1.7 m)	Fr	AC Flora HS	Columbia, SC
G	4	Alexis Brown	5 ft 6 in (1.68 m)	Jr	Morgan County HS	Madison, GA
F	5	Tsubasa Nisbet	6 ft 0 in (1.83 m)	Fr	Burnside HS	Christchurch, New Zealand
F/C	10	Ella Felkins	6 ft 2 in (1.88 m)	Fr	Klein Collins HS	Spring, TX
G/F	13	Nakol Franks	5 ft 7 in (1.7 m)	Jr	Wren HS	Greenville, SC
G	14	Lola Loviett	5 ft 10 in (1.78 m)	Fr	John T. Hoggard HS	Wilmington, NC
G	15	Amira Atwater	5 ft 6 in (1.68 m)	Jr	Douglas County HS	Douglasville, GA
G	23	Tatum Barber	5 ft 10 in (1.78 m)	So	Liberty Christian School	Dallas, TX
F	32	Hailey Dias-Allen	6 ft 2 in (1.88 m)	Jr	Southeast Guilford HS	Greensboro, NC
F	33	Victoria Stavropoulos	6 ft 0 in (1.83 m)	Jr	Carl Sandburg HS	Orland Park, IL
F/C	42	Sarah Moore	6 ft 1 in (1.85 m)	So	Middleton HS	Spring Hill, FL
F/C	45	Alisha Owens	6 ft 0 in (1.83 m)	RS Fr	Henderson County HS	Henderson, KY

Head coach

- Kip Drown (Missouri State)

Assistant coach(es)

- Lisa Jackson (Erskine)
- Alex Stewart (Georgia Tech)
- Toby Wagoner (Eastern Illinois)

Legend

- (C) Team captain
- (S) Suspended
- (I) Ineligible
- (W) Walk-on
- Injured
- Current redshirt

Roster

== Schedule ==
Date time, TV	Rank^{#}	Opponent^{#}	Result	Record	Site (attendance) city, state
Non-conference regular season
Nov 6, 2018*; 6:30 pm		Wofford	L 65–81	0–1	Hanner Fieldhouse (312); Statesboro, GA
Nov 10, 2018*; 2:30 pm, ACCNE		at Virginia Tech	L 49–78	0–2	Cassell Coliseum (1,252); Blacksburg, VA
Nov 12, 2018*; 6:30 pm		Mercer	L 72–79	0–3	Hanner Fieldhouse (252); Statesboro, GA
Nov 15, 2018*; 7:00 pm		Savannah State	W 82–71	1–3	Hanner Fieldhouse (950); Statesboro, GA
Nov 20, 2018*; 7:00 pm		at Stony Brook	L 43–72	1–4	Island Federal Credit Union Arena (210); Stony Brook, NY
Nov 25, 2018*; 2:00 pm		Bethune–Cookman	W 77–76	2–4	Hanner Fieldhouse (283); Statesboro, GA
Nov 28, 2018*; 7:00 pm, ESPN+		at Kennesaw State	L 58–79	2–5	KSU Convocation Center (415); Kennesaw, GA
Dec 12, 2018*; 5:00 pm, ESPN+		at Presbyterian	W 69–68	3–5	Templeton Center (266); Clinton, SC
Dec 14, 2018*; 11:00 am		Coastal Georgia	W 68–46	4–5	Hanner Fieldhouse (2,278); Statesboro, GA
Dec 18, 2018*; 5:00 pm		Winthrop	W 64–55	5–5	Hanner Fieldhouse (325); Statesboro, GA
Dec 21, 2018*; 1:00 pm		at Georgia	L 39–81	5–6	Stegeman Coliseum (2,724); Athens, GA
Sun Belt regular season
Jan 3, 2019; 6:30 pm		Texas State	L 52–64	5–7 (0–1)	Hanner Fieldhouse (207); Statesboro, GA
Jan 5, 2019; 2:00 pm, ESPN+		UT Arlington	L 53–74	5–8 (0–2)	Hanner Fieldhouse (220); Statesboro, GA
Jan 10, 2019; 7:30 pm		at Louisiana–Monroe	L 57–58	5–9 (0–3)	Fant–Ewing Coliseum (1,051); Monroe, LA
Jan 12, 2019; 3:00 pm, ESPN+		at Louisiana	L 48–59	5–10 (0–4)	Cajundome (1,112); Lafayette, LA
Jan 17, 2019; 6:30 pm		Troy	L 81–97	5–11 (0–5)	Hanner Fieldhouse (268); Statesboro, GA
Jan 19, 2019; 2:00 pm, ESPN+		South Alabama	L 53–69	5–12 (0–6)	Hanner Fieldhouse (254); Statesboro, GA
Jan 24, 2019; 12:30 pm, ESPN+		UT Arlington	L 48–81	5–13 (0–7)	College Park Center (6,186); Arlington, TX
Jan 26, 2019; 3:00 pm, ESPN+		at Texas State	W 65–55	6–13 (1–7)	Strahan Arena (1,437); San Marcos, TX
Feb 2, 2019; 2:00 pm, ESPN+		Georgia State; Modern Day Hate	L 66–83	6–14 (1–8)	Hanner Fieldhouse (425); Statesboro, GA
Feb 7, 2019; 6:30 pm, ESPN+		at Louisiana	W 79–71	7–14 (2–8)	Hanner Fieldhouse (576); Statesboro, GA
Feb 9, 2019; 2:00 pm		Louisiana–Monroe	L 62–80	7–15 (2–9)	Hanner Fieldhouse (512); Statesboro, GA
Feb 14, 2019; 8:00 pm, ESPN+		at South Alabama	L 60–73	7–16 (2–10)	Mitchell Center (341); Mobile, AL
Feb 16, 2019; 3:00 pm, ESPN+		at Troy	L 78–100	7–17 (2–11)	Trojan Arena (1,112); Troy, AL
Feb 21, 2019; 6:30 pm, ESPN+		Coastal Carolina	L 73–76	7–18 (2–12)	Hanner Fieldhouse (187); Statesboro, GA
Feb 23, 2019; 2:00 pm		Appalachian State	L 52–70	7–19 (2–13)	Hanner Fieldhouse (212); Statesboro, GA
Feb 28, 2019; 12:30 pm		at Little Rock	L 51–80	7–20 (2–14)	Jack Stephens Center (1,627); Little Rock, AR
Mar 2, 2019; 5:00 pm, ESPN+		at Arkansas State	L 75–86	7–21 (2–15)	First National Bank Arena (716); Jonesboro, AR
Mar 9, 2019; 2:00 pm, ESPN+		at Georgia State; Modern Day Hate	L 66–73	7–22 (2–16)	GSU Sports Arena (675); Atlanta, GA
*Non-conference game. ^{#}Rankings from AP Poll. (#) Tournament seedings in parentheses. All times are in Eastern Time.

== See also ==
2018–19 Georgia Southern Eagles men's basketball team
