= 2018–19 South Alabama Jaguars women's basketball team =

American college basketball season

2018–19 South Alabama Jaguars women's basketball

FIU Holiday Tournament Champions

WNIT, Second Round
- Conference: Sun Belt Conference
- Record: 25–11 (9–9 Sun Belt)
- Head coach: Terry Fowler (6th season)
- Assistant coaches: Yolisha Jackson; Dan Presel; Rachel Travis
- Home arena: Mitchell Center

2018–19 Sun Belt Conference women's basketball standings
	Conf.				Overall
Team	W		L	PCT	W		L	PCT
UT Arlington	15	–	3	.833	24	–	8	.750
Little Rock †	15	–	3	.833	21	–	11	.656
Troy	13	–	5	.722	22	–	9	.710
Georgia State	11	–	7	.611	17	–	14	.548
Appalachian State	10	–	8	.556	22	–	14	.611
South Alabama	9	–	9	.500	25	–	11	.694
Texas State	9	–	9	.500	14	–	17	.452
Coastal Carolina	8	–	10	.444	17	–	15	.531
Arkansas State	7	–	11	.389	12	–	18	.400
Louisiana	5	–	13	.278	7	–	23	.233
Louisiana–Monroe	4	–	14	.222	10	–	19	.345
Georgia Southern	2	–	16	.111	7	–	22	.241
† 2019 Sun Belt tournament winner

The 2018–19 South Alabama Jaguars women's basketball team represented the University of South Alabama during the 2018–19 NCAA Division I women's basketball season. The Jaguars were led by sixth year head coach Terry Fowler and played their home games at the Mitchell Center as members in the Sun Belt Conference. They finished the season 25–11, 9–9 in Sun Belt play to finish in a tie for sixth place. They advanced to the championship game of the Sun Belt women's tournament where they lost to Little Rock. They received an at-large bid to the WNIT where they defeated Lamar in the first round before losing to Wyoming in the second round.

== Roster ==
2018–19 South Alabama Jaguars women's basketball team
Players
Coaches

Pos.	#	Name	Height	Year	Previous school	Hometown
G	1	Mahogany Vaught	5 ft 6 in (1.68 m)	Fr	Olive Branch HS	Olive Branch, MS
G	2	Shaforia Kines	5 ft 5 in (1.65 m)	Jr	Huffman HS	Birmingham, AL
G	3	Jayla Morrow	5 ft 8 in (1.73 m)	So	Wenonah HS	Birmingham, AL
G	4	Christen Carter	5 ft 11 in (1.8 m)	RS Jr	The Bolles School	Jacksonville, FL
G/F	5	Emerald Hart	5 ft 9 in (1.75 m)	Jr	Pal Beach Gardens HS; NW Kansas Tech	Riviera Beach, FL
G	12	Damaya Telemaque	5 ft 8 in (1.73 m)	Fr	Summer Creek HS	Houston, TX
G	14	Savannah Jones	6 ft 0 in (1.83 m)	RS So	St. Martin HS	Ocean Springs, MS
G	15	Alexis Sykes	5 ft 8 in (1.73 m)	So	Nazareth Regional HS	Brooklyn, NY
G	21	Casey Ferguson	5 ft 11 in (1.8 m)	So	D'Iberville HS	Biloxi, MS
G	23	Jala Buster	5 ft 10 in (1.78 m)	Fr	Cypress Ranch HS	Houston, TX
F	25	Kennedi Centers	6 ft 0 in (1.83 m)	Jr	Samuel Clemens HS	New Braunfels, TX
F/C	35	Antoinette Lewis	6 ft 1 in (1.85 m)	So	Harding Academy	Memphis, TN
F/C	44	India Hall	6 ft 2 in (1.88 m)	Sr	Brentwood Academy	Antioch, TN
G	45	Devyn Lowe	5 ft 7 in (1.7 m)	RS Fr	Woodstock HS	Woodstock, GA

Head coach

- Terry Fowler (Lane College)

Assistant coach(es)

- Yolisha Jackson (Jacksonville)
- Dan Presel (Spring Hill)
- Rachel Travis (Northwest)

Legend

- (C) Team captain
- (S) Suspended
- (I) Ineligible
- (W) Walk-on
- Injured
- Current redshirt

Roster

== Schedule ==
Date time, TV	Rank^{#}	Opponent^{#}	Result	Record	Site (attendance) city, state
Exhibition
Nov 1, 2018*; 7:00 pm		William Carey	W 82–38		Mitchell Center (582); Mobile, AL
Non-conference regular season
Nov 7, 2018*; 7:00 pm, ESPN+		Spring Hill	W 75–57	1–0	Mitchell Center (491); Mobile, AL
Nov 14, 2018*; 7:00 pm, ESPN+		Southern Miss	W 77–68	2–0	Mitchell Center (781); Mobile, AL
Nov 17, 2018*; 2:00 pm		at Central Arkansas	W 58–50	3–0	Farris Center (325); Conway, AR
Nov 19, 2018*; 5:30 pm		at Southern	W 53–49	4–0	F. G. Clark Center (175); Baton Rouge, LA
Nov 26, 2018*; 7:00 pm, ESPN+		East Tennessee State	W 81–74	5–0	Mitchell Center (316); Mobile, AL
Nov 29, 2018*; 7:00 pm		at Tennessee State	W 78–56	6–0	Gentry Complex (387); Nashville, TN
Dec 5, 2018*; 11:30 am		at Alabama	W 72–67	7–0	Coleman Coliseum (4,149); Tuscaloosa, AL
Dec 9, 2018*; 7:00 pm, ESPN+		Alabama State	W 77–65	8–0	Mitchell Center (613); Mobile, AL
Dec 17, 2018*; 7:00 pm, ESPN+		Faulkner	W 97–40	9–0	Mitchell Center (443); Mobile, AL
Dec 20, 2018*; 1:00 pm		vs. New Mexico State; FIU Holiday Tournament semifinals	W 68–67	10–0	Ocean Bank Convocation Center; Miami, FL
Dec 21, 2018*; 1:00 pm		at FIU; FIU Holiday Tournament championship	W 84–77 ^{2OT}	11–0	Ocean Bank Convocation Center; Miami, FL
Sun Belt regular season
Jan 3, 2019; 5:30 pm		at Appalachian State	L 63–71	11–1 (0–1)	Holmes Center (323); Boone, NC
Jan 5, 2019; 1:00 pm		at Coastal Carolina	W 88–78	12–1 (1–1)	HTC Center (224); Conway, SC
Jan 10, 2019; 7:00 pm, ESPN+		Arkansas State	L 64–77	12–2 (1–2)	Mitchell Center (474); Mobile, AL
Jan 12, 2019; 3:00 pm, ESPN+		Little Rock	L 42–65	12–3 (1–3)	Mitchell Center (391); Mobile, AL
Jan 17, 2019; 5:00 pm		at Georgia State	W 68–59	13–3 (2–3)	GSU Sports Arena (365); Atlanta, GA
Jan 19, 2019; 1:00 pm		at Georgia Southern	W 69–53	14–3 (3–3)	Hanner Fieldhouse (254); Statesboro, GA
Jan 24, 2019; 11:00 am		Louisiana	W 83–60	15–3 (4–3)	Mitchell Center (2,152); Mobile, AL
Jan 26, 2019; 3:00 pm		Louisiana–Monroe	W 77–49	16–3 (5–3)	Mitchell Center (381); Mobile, AL
Feb 2, 2019; 3:00 pm, ESPN+		Troy	W 80–77	17–3 (6–3)	Mitchell Center (4,469); Mobile, AL
Feb 7, 2019; 7:00 pm, ESPN+		at Arkansas State	L 58–69	17–4 (6–4)	First National Bank Arena (587); Jonesboro, AR
Feb 9, 2019; 3:00 pm		at Little Rock	L 44–47	17–5 (6–5)	Jack Stephens Center (1,227); Little Rock, AR
Feb 14, 2019; 7:00 pm, ESPN+		Georgia Southern	W 73–60	18–5 (7–5)	Mitchell Center (341); Mobile, AL
Feb 16, 2019; 3:00 pm, ESPN+		Georgia State	W 62–59	19–5 (8–5)	Mitchell Center (391); Mobile, AL
Feb 23, 2019; 2:00 pm, ESPN+		at Troy	L 58–66	19–6 (8–6)	Trojan Arena (2,327); Troy, AL
Feb 28, 2019; 7:00 pm		at UT Arlington	L 51–72	19–7 (8–7)	College Park Center (1,139); Arlington, TX
Mar 2, 2019; 2:00 pm		at Texas State	L 45–77	19–8 (8–8)	Strahan Arena (2,084); San Marcos, TX
Mar 7, 2019; 7:00 pm, ESPN+		Coastal Carolina	W 67–50	20–8 (9–8)	Mitchell Center (376); Mobile, AL
Mar 9, 2019; 4:00 pm, ESPN+		Appalachian State	L 50–59	20–9 (9–9)	Mitchell Center (382); Mobile, AL
Sun Belt Women's Tournament
Mar 6, 2019; 7:00 pm, ESPN+	(7)	(10) Louisiana; First Round	W 73–61	21–9	Mitchell Center (214); Mobile, AL
Mar 13, 2019; 2:00 pm, ESPN+	(7)	vs. (6) Texas State; Second Round	W 68–67	22–9	Lakefront Arena; New Orleans, LA
Mar 14, 2019; 2:00 pm, ESPN+	(7)	vs. (3) Troy; Quarterfinals	W 87–74	23–9	Lakefront Arena; New Orleans, LA
Mar 15, 2019; 2:00 pm, ESPN+	(7)	vs. (2) UT Arlington; Semifinals	W 57–50	24–9	Lakefront Arena; New Orleans, LA
Mar 16, 2019; 11:00 am, ESPN3	(7)	vs. (1) Little Rock; Championship Game	L 56–57	24–10	Lakefront Arena; New Orleans, LA
WNIT
Mar 22, 2019*; 7:00 pm, ESPN3		at Lamar; First Round	W 73–71	25–10	Montagne Center (1,829); Beaumont, TX
Mar 24, 2019*; 3:00 pm		at Wyoming; Second Round	L 71–78	25–11	Arena-Auditorium (3,405); Laramie, WY
*Non-conference game. ^{#}Rankings from AP Poll. (#) Tournament seedings in parentheses. All times are in Eastern Time.

== Rankings ==
2018–19 NCAA Division I women's basketball rankings

+ Regular season polls	Poll	Pre- Season	Week 2	Week 3	Week 4	Week 5	Week 6	Week 7	Week 8	Week 9	Week 10	Week 11	Week 12	Week 13	Week 14	Week 15	Week 16	Week 17	Week 18	Week 19	Final
AP																				N/A	
Coaches		N/A		RV	RV	RV	RV	RV	RV	RV	RV			RV							

Legend
	Increase in ranking
	Decrease in ranking
	No change
(RV)	Received votes
(NR)	Not ranked

== See also ==
- 2018–19 South Alabama Jaguars men's basketball team
