= 2019 Women's Basketball Invitational =

American women's college basketball tournament

- Season: 2018–19
- Teams: 16
- Champions: Appalachian State

The 2019 Women's Basketball Invitational (WBI) was a single-elimination tournament consisting of 16 National Collegiate Athletic Association (NCAA) Division I teams that did not participate in the 2019 NCAA Division I women's basketball tournament or 2019 Women's National Invitation Tournament. The 2019 field was announced on March 18. First round WBI games took place on March 20 and 21; second-round games were played on March 25 and 26. The tournament semifinals were held March 29 and 30, and the 2019 WBI Championship game was held on April 3. Appalachian State defeated North Texas to win their second WBI championship.

== Bracket ==
First Round; March 20–21
UC Riverside	60
Utah State	68
North Texas	56
Texas–Rio Grande Valley	42
Southern Miss	77
Nicholls	71
North Alabama	64
Georgia State	57
Tennessee Tech	73
Akron	59
Coastal Carolina	54
Campbell	58
UNC Asheville	55
Appalachian State	57
Davidson	64
Marshall	67

Quarterfinals; March 25–26
Utah State	54
North Texas	56
Southern Miss	65
North Alabama	69
Tennessee Tech	62
Campbell	70
Appalachian State	83
Marshall	71

Semifinals
March 29
North Texas	56
North Alabama	53
March 30
Campbell	57
Appalachian State	70

Championship
April 3
North Texas	59
Appalachian State	76

== See also ==
- 2019 NCAA Division I women's basketball tournament
- 2019 Women's National Invitation Tournament
