= Joe Foley =

American women's basketball coach

Biographical details
- Born: August 12, 1955 (age 71); Harrison, Arkansas, U.S.
- Education: Central Arkansas

Coaching career (HC unless noted)
- 1979–1981: Oxford (Ark.) High School (boys & girls)
- 1981–1984: Morrilton High School
- 1987–2003: Arkansas Tech
- 2003–2024: Little Rock

Head coaching record
- Overall: 853–299

Accomplishments and honors

Championships
- 2 NAIA Division I women's tournament (1992, 1993) 8 Arkansas Intercollegiate Conference championships 6 Gulf South Conference West Division championships 2 Gulf South Conference regular season championships 6 Sun Belt Conference West Division championships 5 Sun Belt Conference regular season championships 5 Sun Belt Conference Tournament championships 1 Ohio Valley Conference regular season championship

Records
- Winningest women's college basketball coach in the state of Arkansas.

Joe Michael Foley (born August 12, 1955) is an American women's basketball coach. He coached the Little Rock Trojans women's basketball team from 2003 until 2024. He coached from 1987 to 2003 at Arkansas Tech.

== Career ==
Since Foley was brought on as head coach, Little Rock has won the West Division in the Sun Belt in 2008, 2009, 2010, and 2013. They won the Sun Belt Conference Tournament in 2011, 2012, and 2015. They have made the WNIT in 2008, 2009, and 2013. They made the Second Round of the NCAA Tournament in 2010 beating Georgia Tech 63–53. They lost to Oklahoma 60–44 in the subsequent game. They made the Second Round in 2015 after beating Texas A&M 69–60. They lost 57–54 to Arizona State in the subsequent game.

Before he came to Little Rock, Foley coached the Arkansas Tech Golden Suns for 17 seasons, from 1987 to 2003. In that time, Foley lead the Golden Suns to 11 conference championships, 14 appearances in the NAIA and NCAA Division II women's basketball tournaments, 6 appearances in the NAIA and NCAA Division II Women's Final Four, and back-to-back NAIA national championships in 1992 and 1993. Arkansas Tech moved up in classification from NAIA to NCAA Division II beginning in the 1995–96 school year. Foley's 1999 team finished as the NCAA Division II national runners-up. Six of Foley's teams won 30 games or more, and he coached 12 players that were recognized as All-Americans. Over those seventeen seasons, Foley compiled a record of 456–81 overall, 216–28 in conference play. He holds the record for most wins by a basketball coach in Arkansas Tech history.

== Head coaching record ==
Record table
| Season | Team | Overall | Conference | Standing | Postseason |
|---|---|---|---|---|---|
Arkansas Tech Golden Suns (Arkansas Intercollegiate Conference) (1987–1995)
| 1987–88 | Arkansas Tech | 29–5 | 14–2 | 1st | NAIA Third Place |
| 1988–89 | Arkansas Tech | 35–2 | 16–0 | 1st | Final Four |
| 1989–90 | Arkansas Tech | 30–3 | 15–1 | 1st | |
| 1990–91 | Arkansas Tech | 28–6 | 14–2 | 1st | |
| 1991–92 | Arkansas Tech | 35–1 | 16–0 | 1st | NAIA DI Champions |
| 1992–93 | Arkansas Tech | 31–5 | 12–4 | 1st | NAIA DI Champions |
| 1993–94 | Arkansas Tech | 30–3 | 14–0 | 1st | |
| 1994–95 | Arkansas Tech | 28–6 | 15–1 | 1st | |
Arkansas Tech Golden Suns (Gulf South Conference) (1994–2003)
| 1995–96 | Arkansas Tech | 23–9 | 11–3 | 1st (West) | NAIA DI Second Round |
| 1996–97 | Arkansas Tech | 29–4 | 13–1 | 1st (west) | NAIA DI Final Four |
| 1997–98 | Arkansas Tech | 26–5 | 12–2 | 1st (West) | NCAA DII Elite Eight |
| 1998–99 | Arkansas Tech | 31–7 | 11–3 | | NCAA DII Runner-up |
| 1999–2000 | Arkansas Tech | 24–7 | 13–1 | 1st (West) | NCAA DII Regional semifinals |
| 2000–01 | Arkansas Tech | 23–8 | 13–3 | | NCAA DII Regional semifinals |
| 2001–02 | Arkansas Tech | 25–6 | 13–3 | 1st (West) | NCAA DII Semifinals |
| 2002–03 | Arkansas Tech | 29–4 | 14–2 | 1st (West) | NCCAA DII Regional finals |
| Arkansas Tech: | | 456–81 (.849) | 216–28 (.885) | | |
Arkansas–Little Rock/Little Rock Trojans (Sun Belt Conference) (2003–2022)
| 2003–04 | Arkansas–Little Rock | 10–17 | 3–11 | 5th (East) | |
| 2004–05 | Arkansas–Little Rock | 10–19 | 3–11 | 5th (East) | |
| 2005–06 | Arkansas–Little Rock | 13–15 | 5–9 | 5th (East) | |
| 2006–07 | Arkansas–Little Rock | 21–10 | 12–6 | T–2nd (West) | |
| 2007–08 | Arkansas–Little Rock | 23–9 | 14–4 | 1st (West) | WNIT First Round |
| 2008–09 | Arkansas–Little Rock | 26–7 | 16–2 | 1st (West) | WNIT First Round |
| 2009–10 | Arkansas–Little Rock | 27–6 | 17–1 | 1st (West) | NCAA Second Round |
| 2010–11 | Arkansas–Little Rock | 23–8 | 14–2 | 1st (West) | NCAA First Round |
| 2011–12 | Arkansas–Little Rock | 20–13 | 12–4 | 1st (West) | NCAA First Round |
| 2012–13 | Arkansas–Little Rock | 24–9 | 14–6 | 1st (West) | WNIT First Round |
| 2013–14 | Arkansas–Little Rock | 18–12 | 12–6 | T–3rd | |
| 2014–15 | Arkansas–Little Rock | 25–4 | 18–2 | 1st | NCAA Second Round |
| 2015–16 | Little Rock | 20–12 | 16–4 | 2nd | WNIT First Round |
| 2016–17 | Little Rock | 25–8 | 17–1 | 1st | WNIT Second Round |
| 2017–18 | Little Rock | 23–10 | 17–1 | 1st | NCAA First Round |
| 2018–19 | Little Rock | 24–8 | 15–3 | T–1st | NCAA First Round |
| 2019–20 | Little Rock | 12–19 | 9–9 | T–5th | |
| 2020–21 | Little Rock | 15–11 | 9–7 | 3rd (West) | |
| 2021–22 | Little Rock | 17–10 | 8–4 | T–4th | |
Little Rock Trojans (Ohio Valley Conference) (2022–2024)
| 2022–23 | Little Rock | 21–11 | 17–1 | 1st | WNIT First Round |
| 2023–24 | Little Rock | 12–18 | 11–7 | T–2nd | |
| Arkansas–Little Rock/Little Rock: | | 408–236 (.634) | 258–101 (.719) | | |
| Total: | | 864–317 (.732) | | | |
National champion Postseason invitational champion Conference regular season champion Conference regular season and conference tournament champion Division regular season champion Division regular season and conference tournament champion Conference tournament champion

== See also ==
- List of college women's basketball career coaching wins leaders
