= 2018–19 Dayton Flyers women's basketball team =

Intercollegiate basketball season

2018–19 Dayton Flyers women's basketball

WNIT, First Round
- Conference: Atlantic 10 Conference
- Record: 17–14 (10–6 A-10)
- Head coach: Shauna Green (3rd season)
- Assistant coaches: Simon Harris; Calamity McEntire; Ryan Gensler
- Home arena: UD Arena

2018–19 Atlantic 10 women's basketball standings
	Conf.				Overall
Team	W		L	PCT	W		L	PCT
Fordham †	13	–	3	.813	25	–	9	.735
VCU	13	–	3	.813	24	–	10	.706
Duquesne	11	–	5	.688	19	–	13	.594
Dayton	10	–	6	.625	17	–	14	.548
Davidson	10	–	6	.625	17	–	15	.531
Saint Louis	9	–	7	.563	15	–	16	.484
George Mason	8	–	8	.500	16	–	14	.533
Massachusetts	7	–	9	.438	16	–	16	.500
Saint Joseph's	7	–	9	.438	12	–	19	.387
George Washington	7	–	9	.438	10	–	20	.333
Richmond	6	–	10	.375	9	–	21	.300
St. Bonaventure	5	–	11	.313	8	–	22	.267
La Salle	3	–	13	.188	6	–	25	.194
Rhode Island	3	–	13	.188	8	–	21	.276
† 2019 A10 tournament winner Rankings from AP poll

The 2018–19 Dayton Flyers women's basketball team represented the University of Dayton during the 2018–19 NCAA Division I women's basketball season. The Flyers, led by third-year head coach Shauna Green, play their home games at UD Arena and were members of the Atlantic 10 Conference. They finished the season 17–14, 10–6 in A-10 play to finish in a tie for fourth place. They advanced to the semifinals of the A-10 women's tournament where they lost to VCU. They received an at-large bid to the WNIT where they lost to Northwestern in the first round.

== Media ==
=== Dayton Flyers Sports Network ===
The Dayton Flyers Sports Network will broadcast Flyers games off of their athletic website, DaytonFlyers.com, with Shane White on the call. Most home games will also be featured on the A-10 Digital Network. Select games will be televised.

== Roster ==
2018–19 Dayton Flyers women's basketball team
Players
Coaches

Pos.	#	Name	Height	Year	Previous school	Hometown
G	1	Araion Bradshaw	5 ft 6 in (1.68 m)	RS So	Tabor Academy; South Carolina	Hyde Park, MA
F	2	Jordan Wilmoth	6 ft 3 in (1.91 m)	Jr	Immaculate Heart Academy	Chestnut Ridge, NY
F	3	Brittany Ward	6 ft 1 in (1.85 m)	RS Jr	Pike	Indianapolis, IN
G	4	Shakeela Fowler	5 ft 6 in (1.68 m)	RS Jr	Milwaukee King; Trinity Valley CC	Milwaukee, WI
F	5	Kyla Whitehead	6 ft 2 in (1.88 m)	Fr	Pickerington Central	Pickerington, OH
G	10	Christine Szabo	5 ft 10 in (1.78 m)	Jr	Dublin Coffman	Dublin, OH
F	11	Amari Davidson	6 ft 2 in (1.88 m)	Fr	Avon	Avon, OH
G	12	Jenna Giacone	6 ft 1 in (1.85 m)	Jr	Bethlehem Central	Delmar, NY
F	13	Julia Chandler	6 ft 2 in (1.88 m)	RS Jr	Northern Secondary; Syracuse	Toronto, ON
G	14	Ella Skeens	5 ft 11 in (1.8 m)	Fr	Chillicothe Southern	Chillicothe, OH
G	15	Tiaera Phillips	5 ft 11 in (1.8 m)	Sr	Valdosta; Chipola College	Valdosta, GA
G/F	21	Erin Whalen (redshirt)	6 ft 1 in (1.85 m)	Jr	Providence Day School; Vanderbilt	Charlotte, NC
F	23	Maddy Dennis	6 ft 2 in (1.88 m)	Sr	Mount Lawley	Perth, Western Australia
G	24	Lauren Cannatelli	5 ft 8 in (1.73 m)	Sr	Lakota West	Cincinnati, OH
G/F	30	Ashleigh Parksinson	6 ft 2 in (1.88 m)	Sr	Newark Catholic	Newark, OH
G	42	Jayla Scaife	5 ft 10 in (1.78 m)	Jr	Muncie Central	Muncie, IN

Head coach

- Shauna Green (Canisius)

Assistant coach(es)

- Simon Harris (NC State)
- Calamity McEntire (Tennessee)
- Ryan Gensler (Saint Joseph's)

Legend

- (C) Team captain
- (S) Suspended
- (I) Ineligible
- (W) Walk-on
- Injured
- Current redshirt

Roster

== Schedule ==
Date time, TV	Rank^{#}	Opponent^{#}	Result	Record	Site (attendance) city, state
Exhibition
Nov 1, 2018*; 7:00 pm		Indianapolis	W 67–56		UD Arena (1,436); Dayton, OH
Non-conference regular season
Nov 9, 2018*; 11:00 am		Colgate	W 67–58	1–0	UD Arena (8,811); Dayton, OH
Nov 11, 2018*; 2:00 pm		at No. 9 Maryland	L 71–82	1–1	Xfinity Center (4,631); College Park, MD
Nov 17, 2018*; 2:00 pm		Northeastern	L 79–84 ^{OT}	1–2	UD Arena (1,243); Dayton, OH
Nov 21, 2018*; 7:00 pm		Toledo	W 70–49	2–2	UD Arena (1,669); Dayton, OH
Nov 24, 2018*; 2:00 pm		at Green Bay	L 35–51	2–3	Kress Events Center (1,560); Green Bay, WI
Nov 27, 2018*; 7:00 pm		at No. 18 South Carolina	L 55–65	2–4	Colonial Life Arena (10,423); Columbia, SC
Dec 3, 2018*; 7:00 pm		at James Madison	L 55–68	2–5	JMU Convocation Center (1,829); Harrisburg, VA
Dec 7, 2018*; 2:00 pm		Buffalo	W 72–59	3–5	UD Arena (1,259); Dayton, OH
Dec 15, 2018*; 7:00 pm		Evansville	W 69–30	4–5	UD Arena (1,706); Dayton, OH
Dec 20, 2018*; 2:30 pm		vs. Virginia Tech; West Palm Invitational	L 57–69	4–6	Student Life Center (200); West Palm Beach, FL
Dec 21, 2018*; 2:30 pm		vs. Georgia Tech; West Palm Invitational	W 85–66	5–6	Student Life Center (178); West Palm Beach, FL
Atlantic 10 regular season
Jan 5, 2019; 2:00 pm		La Salle	W 84–45	6–6 (1–0)	UD Arena (2,339); Dayton, OH
Jan 9, 2019; 7:00 pm		Massachusetts	W 75–47	7–6 (2–0)	UD Arena (1,686); Dayton, OH
Jan 12, 2019; 12:00 pm		at George Washington	L 45–46	7–7 (2–1)	Charles E. Smith Center (866); Washington, D.C.
Jan 16, 2019; 6:00 pm		at St. Bonaventure	W 62–49	8–7 (3–1)	Reilly Center (347); Olean, NY
Jan 20, 2019; 2:00 pm, CBSSN		Fordham	W 72–50	9–7 (4–1)	UD Arena (2,082); Dayton, OH
Jan 23, 2019; 12:00 pm		at Saint Louis	L 65–68 ^{3OT}	9–8 (4–2)	Chaifetz Arena (6,283); St. Louis, MO
Jan 27, 2019; 12:00 pm, ESPNU		Saint Joseph's	W 72–65 ^{OT}	10–8 (5–2)	UD Arena (2,211); Dayton, OH
Feb 3, 2019; 1:00 pm		at Rhode Island	W 74–62	11–8 (6–2)	Ryan Center (365); Kingston, RI
Feb 6, 2019; 7:00 pm		Richmond	W 71–50	12–8 (7–2)	UD Arena (1,818); Dayton, OH
Feb 10, 2019; 2:00 pm		at Duquesne	L 57–85	12–9 (7–3)	Palumbo Center (1,236); Pittsburgh, PA
Feb 14, 2019; 6:00 pm		at VCU	L 62–64	12–10 (7–4)	Siegel Center (585); Richmond, VA
Feb 17, 2019; 12:00 pm, ESPNU		George Washington	W 62–53	13–10 (8–4)	UD Arena (2,699); Dayton, OH
Feb 20, 2019; 7:00 pm		Davidson	W 83–69	14–10 (9–4)	UD Arena (2,123); Dayton, OH
Feb 24, 2019; 2:00 pm		at George Mason	L 51–54	14–11 (9–5)	EagleBank Arena (1,842); Fairfax, VA
Feb 27, 2019; 7:00 pm		at Fordham	L 48–57	14–12 (9–6)	Rose Hill Gymnasium; Bronx, NY
Mar 2, 2019; 2:00 pm		Saint Louis	W 73–59	15–12 (10–6)	UD Arena (2,549); Dayton, OH
Atlantic 10 Women's Tournament
Mar 5, 2019; 7:00 pm, ESPN+	(4)	(13) La Salle; First Round	W 65–38	16–12	UD Arena (1,001); Dayton, OH
Mar 8, 2019; 2:00 pm, ESPN+	(4)	vs. (5) Davidson; Quarterfinals	W 84–65	17–12	Palumbo Center; Pittsburgh, PA
Mar 9, 2019; 11:00 am, CBSSN	(4)	vs. (1) VCU; Semifinals	L 52–61	17–13	Palumbo Center; Pittsburgh, PA
WNIT
Mar 21, 2019*; 8:00 pm		at Northwestern; First Round	L 51–74	17–14	Welsh–Ryan Arena (325); Evanston, IL
*Non-conference game. ^{#}Rankings from AP Poll. (#) Tournament seedings in parentheses. All times are in Eastern Time.

== Rankings ==
2018–19 NCAA Division I women's basketball rankings

Regular season polls
Poll	Pre- Season	Week 2	Week 3	Week 4	Week 5	Week 6	Week 7	Week 8	Week 9	Week 10	Week 11	Week 12	Week 13	Week 14	Week 15	Week 16	Week 17	Week 18	Week 19	Final
AP																				N/A
Coaches																				

Legend
	Increase in ranking
	Decrease in ranking
	No change
(RV)	Received votes
(NR)	Not ranked

== See also ==
- 2018–19 Dayton Flyers men's basketball team
