= 2018–19 Saint Louis Billikens women's basketball team =

Intercollegiate basketball season

2018–19 Saint Louis Billikens women's basketball
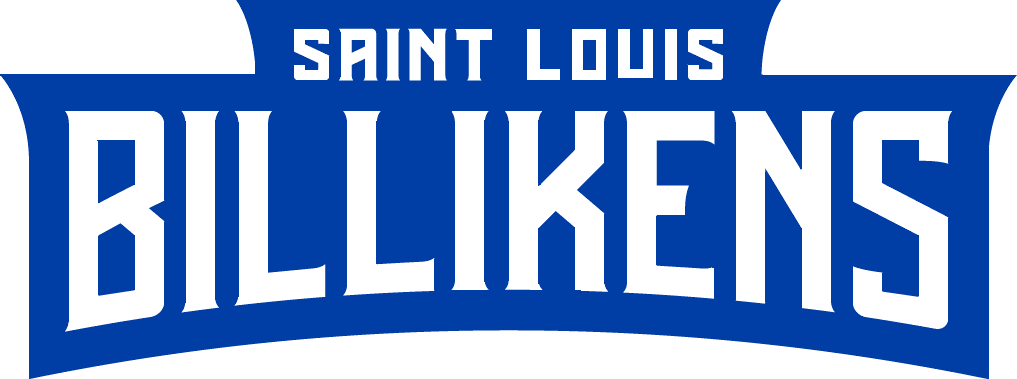
- Conference: Atlantic 10 Conference
- Record: 15–16 (9–7 A-10)
- Head coach: Lisa Stone (7th season)
- Assistant coaches: Ty Margenthaler; Jordann Reese; Kat Martin
- Home arena: Chaifetz Arena

2018–19 Atlantic 10 women's basketball standings
| | Conf. | | | | Overall |
| Team | W | | L | PCT | W | | L | PCT |
|---|---|---|---|---|---|---|---|---|
| Fordham † | 13 | – | 3 | .813 | 25 | – | 9 | .735 |
| VCU | 13 | – | 3 | .813 | 24 | – | 10 | .706 |
| Duquesne | 11 | – | 5 | .688 | 19 | – | 13 | .594 |
| Dayton | 10 | – | 6 | .625 | 17 | – | 14 | .548 |
| Davidson | 10 | – | 6 | .625 | 17 | – | 15 | .531 |
| Saint Louis | 9 | – | 7 | .563 | 15 | – | 16 | .484 |
| George Mason | 8 | – | 8 | .500 | 16 | – | 14 | .533 |
| Massachusetts | 7 | – | 9 | .438 | 16 | – | 16 | .500 |
| Saint Joseph's | 7 | – | 9 | .438 | 12 | – | 19 | .387 |
| George Washington | 7 | – | 9 | .438 | 10 | – | 20 | .333 |
| Richmond | 6 | – | 10 | .375 | 9 | – | 21 | .300 |
| St. Bonaventure | 5 | – | 11 | .313 | 8 | – | 22 | .267 |
| La Salle | 3 | – | 13 | .188 | 6 | – | 25 | .194 |
| Rhode Island | 3 | – | 13 | .188 | 8 | – | 21 | .276 |
† 2019 A10 tournament winner Rankings from AP poll

The 2018–19 Saint Louis Billikens women's basketball team represented the Saint Louis University during the 2018–19 NCAA Division I women's basketball season. The Billikens, led by seventh year head coach Lisa Stone, played their home games at the Chaifetz Arena and were members of the Atlantic 10 Conference. They finished the season 15–16, 9–7 in A-10 play to finish in sixth place. They advanced to the semifinals of the A-10 women's tournament, where they lost to Duquesne.

== Media ==
All non-televised Billikens home games and conference road games stream on the A-10 Digital Network.

== Roster ==
2018–19 Saint Louis Billikens women's basketball team
Players
Coaches

| Pos. | # | Name | Height | Year | Previous school | Hometown |
|---|---|---|---|---|---|---|
| G | 1 | Chloe Rice | 5 ft 11 in (1.8 m) | Fr | Marion | Marion, IA |
| G | 2 | Ciaja Harbison | 5 ft 6 in (1.68 m) | Fr | Male | Louisville, KY |
| G | 4 | Kerri McMahan | 5 ft 10 in (1.78 m) | RS Sr | Novi; Akron | Novi, MI |
| G | 14 | Tasia Jeffries | 5 ft 8 in (1.73 m) | So | Butler | Louisville, KY |
| G | 20 | Jordyn Frantz | 6 ft 0 in (1.83 m) | Sr | NorthWood | Wakarusa, IN |
| C | 24 | Amber Lindfors | 6 ft 4 in (1.93 m) | RS Jr | Elk Grove; Valparaiso | Elk Grove Village, IL |
| G | 30 | Lauryn Hughes | 5 ft 9 in (1.75 m) | So | MICDS | St. Louis, MO |
| G | 32 | Myia Clark | 5 ft 7 in (1.7 m) | Fr | Saint Viator | Schaumburg, IL |
| F | 34 | Kendra Wilken | 6 ft 2 in (1.88 m) | Jr | Breese Central | Bartelso, IL |
| F | 35 | Myriama Smith Traore (redshirt) | 6 ft 2 in (1.88 m) | So | Whitewater; Marquette | Whitewater, WI |
| F/C | 42 | Brooke Flowers | 6 ft 5 in (1.96 m) | Fr | Metro Academic & Classical | St. Louis, MO |
| C | 45 | Tara Dusharm | 6 ft 5 in (1.96 m) | Sr | Foley | Foley, MN |

Head coach

- Lisa Stone (Iowa)

Assistant coach(es)

- Ty Margenthaler (SIU Edwardsville)
- Jordann Reese (Drake)
- Kat Martin (Trinity International)

Legend

- (C) Team captain
- (S) Suspended
- (I) Ineligible
- (W) Walk-on
- Injured
- Current redshirt

Roster

== Schedule ==
| Date time, TV | Rank^{#} | Opponent^{#} | Result | Record | Site (attendance) city, state |
Exhibition
| Nov 2, 2018*; 5:00 pm | | Illinois–Springfield | W 78–40 | | Chaifetz Arena; St. Louis, MO |
Non-conference regular season
| Nov 9, 2018*; 11:00 am | | at Eastern Kentucky | W 70–43 | 1–0 | McBrayer Arena (375); Lexington, KY |
| Nov 13, 2018*; 4:30 pm | | Indiana State | L 56–60 | 1–1 | Chaifetz Arena (437); St. Louis, MO |
| Nov 18, 2018*; 2:00 pm | | Cincinnati | L 50–51 | 1–2 | Chaifetz Arena (517); St. Louis, MO |
| Nov 20, 2018*; 7:00 pm | | at Tulsa | L 75–86 ^{OT} | 1–3 | Reynolds Center (981); Tulsa, OK |
| Nov 24, 2018*; 3:30 pm | | vs. Chattanooga; Cavalier Classic | L 61–71 | 1–4 | John Paul Jones Arena (2,589); Charlottesville, VA |
| Nov 25, 2018*; 2:30 pm | | at Virginia; Cavalier Classic | W 67–65 | 2–4 | John Paul Jones Arena (2,413); Charlottesville, VA |
| Nov 29, 2018*; 7:00 pm | | Southern Illinois | W 62–58 | 3–4 | Chaifetz Arena (488); St. Louis, MO |
| Dec 1, 2018*; 7:00 pm | | SIU Edwardsville | W 63–56 | 4–4 | Chaifetz Arena (583); St. Louis, MO |
| Dec 4, 2018*; 6:00 pm, CBSSN | | No. 1 Connecticut | L 42–98 | 4–5 | Chaifetz Arena (7,105); St. Louis, MO |
| Dec 9, 2018*; 5:00 pm | | No. 23 Missouri | L 62–74 | 4–6 | Chaifetz Arena (3,784); St. Louis, MO |
| Dec 20, 2018*; 11:00 am | | at Illinois State | L 67–72 | 4–7 | Redbird Arena (3,500); Normal, IL |
| Dec 28, 2018*; 1:30 pm | | vs. Yale; FAU Holiday Classic semifinals | L 52–58 | 4–8 | FAU Arena (530); Boca Raton, FL |
| Dec 29, 2018*; 11:00 am | | at Florida Atlantic; FAU Holiday Classic 3rd place game | W 93–61 | 5–8 | FAU Arena (354); Boca Raton, FL |
Atlantic 10 regular season
| Jan 6, 2019; 1:00 pm | | at Massachusetts | L 66–70 | 5–9 (0–1) | Mullins Center (599); Amherst, MA |
| Jan 9, 2019; 10:30 am | | at Saint Joseph's | W 62–49 | 6–9 (1–1) | Hagan Arena (889); Philadelphia, PA |
| Jan 13, 2019; 3:30 pm, CBSSN | | Fordham | L 53–56 | 6–10 (1–2) | Chaifetz Arena (956); St. Louis, MO |
| Jan 16, 2019; 7:00 pm | | Rhode Island | L 56–68 | 6–11 (1–3) | Chaifetz Arena (313); St. Louis, MO |
| Jan 20, 2019; 12:00 pm | | at St. Bonaventure | W 62–45 | 7–11 (2–3) | Reilly Center (250); Olean, NY |
| Jan 23, 2019; 11:00 am | | Dayton | W 68–65 ^{3OT} | 8–11 (3–3) | Chaifetz Arena (6,283); St. Louis, MO |
| Jan 27, 2019; 12:00 pm | | at VCU | L 47–57 | 8–12 (3–4) | Siegel Center (1,263); Richmond, VA |
| Jan 31, 2019; 7:00 pm | | George Mason | W 60–53 | 9–12 (4–4) | Chaifetz Arena (332); St. Louis, MO |
| Feb 3, 2019; 1:00 pm, CBSSN | | George Washington | W 60–46 | 10–12 (5–4) | Chaifetz Arena (746); St. Louis, MO |
| Feb 6, 2019; 6:00 pm | | at Fordham | L 51–54 | 10–13 (5–5) | Rose Hill Gymnasium (883); Bronx, NY |
| Feb 10, 2019; 2:00 pm | | La Salle | W 69–58 | 11–13 (6–5) | Chaifetz Arena (265); St. Louis, MO |
| Feb 13, 2019; 10:00 am | | at Duquesne | W 67–63 | 12–13 (7–5) | Palumbo Center (715); Pittsburgh, PA |
| Feb 17, 2019; 2:00 pm, NBCSN | | Richmond | W 78–48 | 13–13 (8–5) | Chaifetz Arena (5,786); St. Louis, MO |
| Feb 23, 2019; 1:00 pm | | at Davidson | L 57–60 | 13–14 (8–6) | John M. Belk Arena (921); Davidson, NC |
| Feb 27, 2019; 7:00 pm | | VCU | W 76–60 | 14–14 (9–6) | Chaifetz Arena (637); St. Louis, MO |
| Mar 2, 2019; 1:00 pm | | at Dayton | L 57–73 | 14–15 (9–7) | UD Arena (2,549); Dayton, OH |
Atlantic 10 Tournament
| Mar 5, 2019; 7:00 pm, ESPN+ | (6) | (11) Richmond; First Round | W 59–48 | 15–15 | Chaifetz Arena (608); Dayton, OH |
| Mar 8, 2019; 6:00 pm, ESPN+ | (6) | vs. (5) Duquesne; Quarterfinals | L 51–72 | 15–16 | Palumbo Center (1,009); Dayton, OH |
*Non-conference game. ^{#}Rankings from AP Poll. (#) Tournament seedings in parentheses. All times are in Central Time.

== Rankings ==
2018–19 NCAA Division I women's basketball rankings

Regular season polls
| Poll | Pre- Season | Week 2 | Week 3 | Week 4 | Week 5 | Week 6 | Week 7 | Week 8 | Week 9 | Week 10 | Week 11 | Week 12 | Week 13 | Week 14 | Week 15 | Week 16 | Week 17 | Week 18 | Week 19 | Final |
|---|---|---|---|---|---|---|---|---|---|---|---|---|---|---|---|---|---|---|---|---|
| AP | | | | | | | | | | | | | | | | | | | | N/A |
| Coaches | | | | | | | | | | | | | | | | | | | | |

Legend
| | Increase in ranking |
| | Decrease in ranking |
| | No change |
| (RV) | Received votes |
| (NR) | Not ranked |

== See also ==
- 2018–19 Saint Louis Billikens men's basketball team
