= 2018–19 Fordham Rams women's basketball team =

Intercollegiate basketball season

2018–19 Fordham Rams women's basketball

Fordham Holiday Classic champions Atlantic 10 regular-season co-champions Atlantic 10 tournament champions

NCAA tournament, first round
- Conference: Atlantic 10 Conference
- Record: 25–9 (12–3 A-10)
- Head coach: Stephanie Gaitley (8th season)
- Assistant coaches: Angelika Szumilo; Sonia Burke; Valerie Nainima
- Home arena: Rose Hill Gymnasium

2018–19 Atlantic 10 women's basketball standings
	Conf.				Overall
Team	W		L	PCT	W		L	PCT
Fordham †	13	–	3	.813	25	–	9	.735
VCU	13	–	3	.813	24	–	10	.706
Duquesne	11	–	5	.688	19	–	13	.594
Dayton	10	–	6	.625	17	–	14	.548
Davidson	10	–	6	.625	17	–	15	.531
Saint Louis	9	–	7	.563	15	–	16	.484
George Mason	8	–	8	.500	16	–	14	.533
Massachusetts	7	–	9	.438	16	–	16	.500
Saint Joseph's	7	–	9	.438	12	–	19	.387
George Washington	7	–	9	.438	10	–	20	.333
Richmond	6	–	10	.375	9	–	21	.300
St. Bonaventure	5	–	11	.313	8	–	22	.267
La Salle	3	–	13	.188	6	–	25	.194
Rhode Island	3	–	13	.188	8	–	21	.276
† 2019 A10 tournament winner Rankings from AP poll

The 2018–19 Fordham Rams women's basketball team represented Fordham University during the 2018–19 NCAA Division I women's basketball season. The Rams were led by eighth-year head coach Stephanie Gaitley. They were members of the Atlantic 10 Conference (A-10) and played their home games at the Rose Hill Gymnasium. They finished the season 25–9, 13–3 in A-10 play, to win share the regular-season title with VCU. Fordham won the Atlantic 10 Conference tournament championship game over VCU, 62–47. They lost in the first round to Syracuse.

== Media ==
Fordham Rams games were broadcast on WFUV Sports and streamed online through the Fordham Portal. Most home games were also be featured on the A-10 Digital Network. Select games were televised.

== Roster ==
2018–19 Fordham Rams women's basketball team
Players
Coaches

Pos.	#	Name	Height	Year	Previous school	Hometown
G	0	Zara Jillings	5 ft 11 in (1.8 m)	So	Westlake Girls	Auckland, New Zealand
G	1	Alexa Giuliano	5 ft 8 in (1.73 m)	Sr	Morris Catholic; Columbia	Hackettstown, NJ
G	2	Lauren Holden	5 ft 5 in (1.65 m)	Sr	Lower Cape May Regional	Cape May, NJ
G	3	Katie McLoughlin	5 ft 10 in (1.78 m)	So	The Ursuline School	Yonkers, NY
G	5	Catherine Polisano	5 ft 9 in (1.75 m)	Fr	Germantown Academy	Ambler, PA
G	10	Bre Cavanaugh	5 ft 8 in (1.73 m)	RS So	Blair Academy; California	Allamuchy, NJ
G	12	Edona Thaqi (redshirt)	5 ft 9 in (1.75 m)	So	Westhill; UConn Avery Point	Stamford, CT
C	14	Vilisi Tavui	6 ft 4 in (1.93 m)	So	Lelean Memorial	Nausori, Fiji
G	15	Ralene Kwiatkowski	5 ft 8 in (1.73 m)	So	Carolina Day School	Asheville, NC
G	20	Kendell Heremaia	5 ft 9 in (1.75 m)	So	St. Peter's	Whangarei, New Zealand
G	21	Lauren Murphy	5 ft 9 in (1.75 m)	So	Northwest Catholic	West Hartford, CT
F/C	23	Halei Gillis	6 ft 4 in (1.93 m)	So	Carolina Day School	Asheville, NC
G	24	Kaitlyn Downey	6 ft 1 in (1.85 m)	Fr	Maria Regina	Hastings-on-Hudson, NY
G	32	Chloe Chaffin	5 ft 10 in (1.78 m)	Fr	Kingston	Kingston, NY
F	34	Mary Goulding	6 ft 0 in (1.83 m)	Sr	Rangiora; Gillette College	Rangiora, New Zealand
F	43	Megan Jonassen	6 ft 0 in (1.83 m)	Jr	Perkiomen Valley	Schwenksville, PA

Head coach

- Stephanie Gaitley (Villanova)

Assistant coach(es)

- Angelika Szumilo (LIU Brooklyn)
- Sonia Burke (Spring Hill)
- Valerie Nainima (South Carolina)

Legend

- (C) Team captain
- (S) Suspended
- (I) Ineligible
- (W) Walk-on
- Injured
- Current redshirt

Roster
Last update: August 20, 2024

== Schedule ==
Date time, TV	Rank^{#}	Opponent^{#}	Result	Record	Site (attendance) city, state
Exhibition
November 3, 2018*; 7:00 p.m.		New York Tech	W 75–54		Rose Hill Gymnasium; The Bronx, NY
Non-conference regular season
November 9, 2018*; 7:00 p.m., ESPN+		Wagner	W 80–59	1–0	Rose Hill Gymnasium (1,161); The Bronx, NY
November 11, 2018*; 1:00 p.m.		at Northeastern	L 54–58	1–1	Cabot Center (325); Boston, MA
November 14, 2018*; 7:00 p.m., ESPN+		Penn State	L 55–72	1–2	Rose Hill Gymnasium (639); The Bronx, NY
November 18, 2018*; 2:30 p.m., ESPN+		Charlotte	W 71–64	2–2	Rose Hill Gymnasium (1,917); The Bronx, NY
November 23, 2018*; 11:00 a.m.		vs. Ball State; Gulf Coast Showcase quarterfinals	W 78–70	3–2	Hertz Arena (429); Estero, FL
November 24, 2018*; 5:00 p.m.		vs. Washington; Gulf Coast Showcase semifinals	W 65–57	4–2	Hertz Arena (753); Estero, FL
November 25, 2018*; 7:30 p.m.		vs. No. 10 Texas; Gulf Coast Showcase championship	L 54–72	4–3	Hertz Arena; Estero, FL
November 29, 2018*; 7:00 p.m.		at Georgetown	L 38–58	4–4	McDonough Gymnasium (217); Washington, D.C.
December 1, 2018*; 2:00 p.m., ESPN+		Manhattan; Battle of the Bronx	W 65–61	5–4	Rose Hill Gymnasium (798); The Bronx, NY
December 5, 2018*; 7:00 p.m.		at Pittsburgh	L 62–65	5–5	Petersen Events Center (569); Pittsburgh, PA
December 11, 2018*; 6:00 p.m., ESPN+		Columbia	W 68–49	6–5	Rose Hill Gymnasium; The Bronx, NY
December 21, 2018*; 12:00 p.m.		at Iona	W 57–40	7–5	Hynes Athletic Center (458); New Rochelle, NY
December 29, 2018*; 1:00 p.m., ESPN+		Maine; Fordham Holiday Classic semifinals	W 72–64 ^{OT}	8–5	Rose Hill Gymnasium; The Bronx, NY
December 30, 2018*; 3:00 p.m., ESPN+		Middle Tennessee; Fordham Holiday Classic championship	W 61–49	9–5	Rose Hill Gymnasium; The Bronx, NY
Atlantic 10 regular season
January 5, 2019; 11:00 a.m., CBSSN		at George Washington	W 50–38	10–5 (1–0)	Charles E. Smith Center (858); Washington, D.C.
January 9, 2019; 11:00 a.m., ESPN+		Richmond	W 60–48	11–5 (2–0)	Rose Hill Gymnasium (2,538); The Bronx, NY
January 13, 2019; 4:00 p.m., CBSSN		at Saint Louis	W 56–53	12–5 (3–0)	Chaifetz Arena (956); St. Louis, MO
January 16, 2019; 7:00 p.m., ESPN+		VCU	L 44–47	12–6 (3–1)	Rose Hill Gymnasium (975); The Bronx, NY
January 20, 2019; 2:00 p.m., CBSSN		at Dayton	L 50–72	12–7 (3–2)	UD Arena (2,082); Dayton, OH
January 24, 2019; 7:00 p.m.		at Rhode Island	W 56–38	13–7 (4–2)	Ryan Center (315); Kingston, RI
January 27, 2019; 2:00 p.m., ESPN+		Davidson	L 56–60	13–8 (4–3)	Rose Hill Gymnasium (919); The Bronx, NY
January 31, 2019; 7:00 p.m., ESPN+		at La Salle	W 65–54	14–8 (5–3)	Tom Gola Arena (374); Philadelphia, PA
February 3, 2019; 12:00 p.m., CBSSN		Duquesne	W 57–46	15–8 (6–3)	Rose Hill Gymnasium (861); The Bronx, NY
February 6, 2019; 7:00 p.m., ESPN+		Saint Louis	W 54–51	16–8 (7–3)	Rose Hill Gymnasium (883); The Bronx, NY
February 10, 2019; 2:00 p.m., ESPN+		George Mason	W 64–53	17–8 (8–3)	Rose Hill Gymnasium (919); The Bronx, NY
February 13, 2019; 2:00 p.m., ESPN+		at Davidson	W 58–42	18–8 (9–3)	John M. Belk Arena (418); Davidson, NC
February 16, 2019; 1:00 p.m., ESPN+		at St. Bonaventure	W 53–44	19–8 (10–3)	Reilly Center (848); Olean, NY
February 24, 2019; 2:00 p.m., ESPN+		Massachusetts	W 76–64	20–8 (11–3)	Rose Hill Gymnasium (1,006); The Bronx, NY
February 27, 2019; 7:00 p.m., ESPN+		Dayton	W 57–48	21–8 (12–3)	Rose Hill Gymnasium; The Bronx, NY
March 2, 2019; 12:00 p.m., ESPN+		at Saint Joseph's	W 51–41	22–8 (13–3)	Hagan Arena (557); Philadelphia, PA
Atlantic 10 women's tournament
March 8, 2019; 4:30 p.m., ESPN+	(2)	vs. (10) Massachusetts; Quarterfinals	W 73–62	23–8	Palumbo Center; Pittsburgh, PA
March 9, 2019; 1:30 p.m., CBSSN	(2)	vs. (3) Duquesne; Semifinals	W 76–34	24–8	Palumbo Center; Pittsburgh, PA
March 10, 2019; 12:00 p.m., ESPNU	(2)	vs. (1) VCU; Championship game	W 62–47	25–8	Palumbo Center; Pittsburgh, PA
NCAA women's tournament
March 23, 2019*; 1:30 p.m., ESPN2	(14 P)	at (3 P) No. 12 Syracuse; First round	L 49–70	25–9	Carrier Dome (2,785); Syracuse, NY
*Non-conference game. ^{#}Rankings from AP poll. (#) Tournament seedings in parentheses. P=Portland Region. All times are in Eastern.

== Rankings ==
Regular-season polls
Poll	Pre- season	Week 2	Week 3	Week 4	Week 5	Week 6	Week 7	Week 8	Week 9	Week 10	Week 11	Week 12	Week 13	Week 14	Week 15	Week 16	Week 17	Week 18	Week 19	Final
AP																				N/A
Coaches																				

Legend
	Increase in ranking
	Decrease in ranking
	No change
(RV)	Received votes
(NR)	Not ranked

== See also ==
- 2018–19 Fordham Rams men's basketball team
