= 2019 Atlantic 10 women's basketball tournament =

- Classification: Division I
- Season: 2018–19
- Teams: 14
- Site: Campus Sites
- Finals site: Palumbo Center; Pittsburgh, PA
- Champions: Fordham (2nd title)
- Winning coach: Stephanie Gaitley (2nd title)
- MVP: Mary Goulding (Fordham)
- Television: CBSSN, ESPN+, ESPNU

2018–19 Atlantic 10 women's basketball standings
	Conf.				Overall
Team	W		L	PCT	W		L	PCT
Fordham †	13	–	3	.813	25	–	9	.735
VCU	13	–	3	.813	24	–	10	.706
Duquesne	11	–	5	.688	19	–	13	.594
Dayton	10	–	6	.625	17	–	14	.548
Davidson	10	–	6	.625	17	–	15	.531
Saint Louis	9	–	7	.563	15	–	16	.484
George Mason	8	–	8	.500	16	–	14	.533
Massachusetts	7	–	9	.438	16	–	16	.500
Saint Joseph's	7	–	9	.438	12	–	19	.387
George Washington	7	–	9	.438	10	–	20	.333
Richmond	6	–	10	.375	9	–	21	.300
St. Bonaventure	5	–	11	.313	8	–	22	.267
La Salle	3	–	13	.188	6	–	25	.194
Rhode Island	3	–	13	.188	8	–	21	.276
† 2019 A10 tournament winner Rankings from AP poll

The 2019 Atlantic 10 women's basketball tournament was a postseason tournament that conclude the 2018–19 season of the Atlantic 10 Conference. It was played at campus sites on March 5 for the first round, with the remaining games held on March 8–10 at the Palumbo Center in Pittsburgh, Pennsylvania. Fordham defeated VCU, 62–47, to win the tournament championship and earn the automatic bid to the NCAA tournament.

== Seeds ==
Teams were seeded by record within the conference, with a tiebreaker system to seed teams with identical conference records.

Seed	School	Conf	Overall	Tiebreaker
#1	‡† – VCU	13–3	21–8	1–0 vs. Fordham
#2	† – Fordham	13–3	22–8	0–1 vs. VCU
#3	Duquesne	11–5	17–12	
#4	Dayton	10–6	15–12	1–0 vs. Davidson
#5	Davidson	10–6	16–13	0–1 vs. Dayton
#6	Saint Louis	9–7	14–15	
#7	George Mason	8–8	16–13	
#8	Saint Joseph's	7–9	11–18	2-0 vs. GW/UMass
#9	George Washington	7–9	11–18	1–1 vs. SJU/UMass
#10	UMass	7–9	15–15	0-2 vs. SJU/GW
#11	Richmond	6–10	9–20	
#12	St. Bonaventure	5–11	8–21	
#13	La Salle	3–13	6–24	1–0 vs. URI
#14	Rhode Island	3–13	8–20	0–1 vs. LAS
‡ – Atlantic 10 regular season champions, and tournament No. 1 seed. † – Received a single-bye in the conference tournament.

== Schedule ==
Session	Game	Time*	Matchup^{#}	Television	Attendance
First round - Tuesday, March 5
1		3:00 pm	No. 9 George Washington at No. 8 Saint Joseph's	ESPN+	278
2		7:00 pm	No. 13 La Salle at No. 4 Dayton	ESPN+	1,001
3		7:00 pm	No. 12 St. Bonaventure at No. 5 Davidson	ESPN+	462
4		12:00 pm	No. 10 UMass at No. 7 George Mason	ESPN+	259
5		7:00 pm	No. 14 Rhode Island at No. 3 Duquesne	ESPN+	601
6		8:00 pm	No. 11 Richmond at No. 6 Saint Louis	ESPN+	608
Quarterfinals - Friday, March 8
7	7	11:00 am	No. 8 Saint Joseph's vs. No. 1 VCU	ESPN+	1,009
7	8	2:00 pm	No. 4 Dayton vs. No. 5 Davidson	ESPN+	1,009
8	9	4:30 pm	No. 10 UMass vs. No. 2 Fordham	ESPN+	1,009
8	10	7:00 pm	No. 3 Duquesne vs. No. 6 Saint Louis	ESPN+	1,009
Semifinals - Saturday, March 9
9	11	11:00 am	No. 1 VCU vs. No. 4 Dayton	CBSSN	
9	12	1:30 pm	No. 2 Fordham vs. No. 3 Duquesne	CBSSN	
Championship - Sunday, March 10
10	13	12:00 pm	No. 1 VCU vs. No. 2 Fordham	ESPNU	

*Game times in Eastern Time. #Rankings denote tournament seeding.

== Bracket ==
- All times are Eastern.

First round Campus Sites; March 5 ESPN+
8	Saint Joseph's	61
9	George Washington	49
5	Davidson	74
12	St. Bonaventure	49
4	Dayton	65
13	La Salle	38
6	Saint Louis	58
11	Richmond	49
3	Duquesne	106
14	Rhode Island	69
7	George Mason	80
10	UMass	86 2OT

Quarterfinals; Palumbo Center; March 8 ESPN+
1	VCU	58
8	Saint Joseph's	47
5	Davidson	65
4	Dayton	84
6	Saint Louis	51
3	Duquesne	72
10	UMass	62
2	Fordham	73

Semifinals; Palumbo Center; March 9 CBSSN
1	VCU	61
4	Dayton	52
3	Duquesne	34
2	Fordham	76

Championship; Palumbo Center; March 10; ESPNU
1	VCU	47
2	Fordham	62

== See also ==
- 2019 Atlantic 10 men's basketball tournament
