= 2018–19 UMass Minutewomen basketball team =

Intercollegiate basketball season

2018–19 UMass Minutewomen basketball
- Conference: Atlantic 10 Conference
- Record: 16–16 (7–9 A-10)
- Head coach: Tory Verdi (3rd season)
- Assistant coaches: Danny Hughes; Candice Finley; Candice Walker
- Home arena: William D. Mullins Memorial Center

2018–19 Atlantic 10 women's basketball standings
	Conf.				Overall
Team	W		L	PCT	W		L	PCT
Fordham †	13	–	3	.813	25	–	9	.735
VCU	13	–	3	.813	24	–	10	.706
Duquesne	11	–	5	.688	19	–	13	.594
Dayton	10	–	6	.625	17	–	14	.548
Davidson	10	–	6	.625	17	–	15	.531
Saint Louis	9	–	7	.563	15	–	16	.484
George Mason	8	–	8	.500	16	–	14	.533
Massachusetts	7	–	9	.438	16	–	16	.500
Saint Joseph's	7	–	9	.438	12	–	19	.387
George Washington	7	–	9	.438	10	–	20	.333
Richmond	6	–	10	.375	9	–	21	.300
St. Bonaventure	5	–	11	.313	8	–	22	.267
La Salle	3	–	13	.188	6	–	25	.194
Rhode Island	3	–	13	.188	8	–	21	.276
† 2019 A10 tournament winner Rankings from AP poll

The 2018–19 UMass Minutewomen basketball team represented the University of Massachusetts Amherst, in the United States, during the 2018–19 college basketball season. The Minutewomen, led by third year head coach Tory Verdi, were members of the Atlantic 10 Conference and played their home games at the William D. Mullins Memorial Center. They finished the season 16–16, 7–9 in A-10 play to finish in a 3 way tie for eighth place. They advanced to the quarterfinals of the A-10 women's tournament, where they lost Duquesne.

== Media ==
All non-televised Minutewomen home games and conference road games stream on the A-10 Digital Network. WMUA carries Minutewomen games with Mike Knittle on the call.

== Roster ==
2018–19 UMass Minutewomen women's basketball team
Players
Coaches

Pos.	#	Name	Height	Year	Previous school	Hometown
G/F	2	Genesis Rivera	5 ft 11 in (1.8 m)	Sr	Gustavo; Panola College	Caracas, Venezuela
G	3	Destiney Philoxy	5 ft 7 in (1.7 m)	Fr	South Shore	Queens, NY
F	10	Alexia Allesch	6 ft 1 in (1.85 m)	So	Gill St. Bernard's	Basking Ridge, NJ
G	11	Bre Hampton-Bey	5 ft 6 in (1.68 m)	So	Notre Dame Academy	Toledo, OH
F	12	MacKenzie Sullivan (W)	5 ft 9 in (1.75 m)	Sr	Hopkins Academy	Hadley, MA
C	14	Anil Soysal	6 ft 5 in (1.96 m)	RS Fr	Anatolian	Istanbul, Turkey
G	15	Paige McCormick	5 ft 11 in (1.8 m)	So	Heuvelton Central	Ogdensburg, NY
F	21	Jessica Nelson	5 ft 9 in (1.75 m)	Fr	Buford	Buford, GA
G	22	Jessica George (C)	5 ft 10 in (1.78 m)	Sr	North Point	Waldorf, MD
G	23	Vashnie Perry	5 ft 6 in (1.68 m)	Jr	Norcross HS; Florida Atlantic	Nashville, TN
G/F	24	Hailey Leidel (C)	5 ft 11 in (1.8 m)	Jr	Woodhaven	Brownstown, MI
F	30	Alexa Kellner	6 ft 1 in (1.85 m)	Fr	Stamford	Stamford, CT
G	32	Madison Lowery	6 ft 1 in (1.85 m)	Fr	TPLS Christian Academy	Virginia Beach, VA
G	35	Asia McCoy	5 ft 10 in (1.78 m)	Fr	Archer	Lawrenceville, GA

Head coach

- Tory Verdi (Keene State)

Assistant coach(es)

- Danny Hughes (TCU)
- Candice Finley (Eastern Kentucky)
- Candice Walker (Loyola (MD))

Legend

- (C) Team captain
- (S) Suspended
- (I) Ineligible
- (W) Walk-on
- Injured
- Current redshirt

Roster

== Schedule ==
Date time, TV	Rank^{#}	Opponent^{#}	Result	Record	Site (attendance) city, state
Exhibition
Oct 31, 2018*; 7:00 pm, ESPN+		UMass Dartmouth	W 109–51		Mullins Center; Amherst, MA
Non-conference regular season
Nov 6, 2018*; 4:30 pm, ELVN/NESN+		Sacred Heart	W 78–61	1–0	Mullins Center (547); Amherst, MA
Nov 11, 2018*; 2:00 pm		at Towson	L 53–78	1–1	SECU Arena (1,389); Towson, MD
Nov 17, 2018*; 2:00 pm, ESPN+		Central Connecticut	W 74–59	2–1	Mullins Center (676); Amherst, MA
Nov 20, 2018*; 7:00 pm, ESPN+		Texas–Rio Grande Valley	W 74–70	3–1	Mullins Center (413); Amherst, MA
Nov 23, 2018*; 6:00 pm, ESPN+		vs. Bucknell; Brown University Turkey Tip-Off	L 58–77	3–2	Pizzitola Sports Center (436); Providence, RI
Nov 24, 2018*; 2:00 pm, ESPN+		at Brown; Brown University Turkey Tip-Off	W 90–61	4–2	Pizzitola Sports Center; Providence, RI
Nov 25, 2018*; 3:00 pm, ESPN+		vs. Fairfield; Brown University Turkey Tip-Off	W 59–49	5–2	Pizzitola Sports Center; Providence, RI
Nov 28, 2018*; 4:30 pm, ELVN/NESN		North Dakota	L 52–59	5–3	Mullins Center (654); Amherst, MA
Dec 2, 2018*; 1:00 pm, NESN		at Northeastern	L 52–53	5–4	Cabot Center (279); Boston, MA
Dec 7, 2018*; 7:00 pm, ESPN+		Incarnate Word	W 71–59	6–4	Mullins Center (555); Amherst, MA
Dec 12, 2018*; 7:00 pm, ESPN+		Boston University	W 66–55	7–4	Mullins Center (518); Amherst, MA
Dec 16, 2018*; 2:00 pm		at Siena	L 59–64	7–5	Alumni Recreation Center (372); Loudonville, NY
Dec 21, 2018*; 1:00 pm, ESPN+		UMass Lowell	L 59–62	7–6	Mullins Center (422); Amherst, MA
Dec 29, 2018*; 2:00 pm, ESPN+		at Marist	W 70–55	8–6	McCann Arena (1,789); Poughkeepsie, NY
A-10 Regular season
Jan 6, 2019; 2:00 pm, ESPN+		Saint Louis	W 70–66	9–6 (1–0)	Mullins Center (599); Amherst, MA
Jan 9, 2019; 7:00 pm, ESPN+		at Dayton	L 47–75	9–7 (1–1)	UD Arena (1,686); Dayton, OH
Jan 13, 2019; 2:00 pm, ESPN+		at La Salle	W 74–60	10–7 (2–1)	Tom Gola Arena (362); Philadelphia, PA
Jan 16, 2019; 12:00 pm, NBCSN		George Mason	L 52–70	10–8 (2–2)	Mullins Center (3,310); Amherst, MA
Jan 20, 2019; 1:00 pm, ESPN+		at Davidson	W 70–58	11–8 (3–2)	John M. Belk Arena (511); Davidson, NC
Jan 26, 2019; 2:00 pm, ESPN+		St. Bonaventure	L 63–64	11–9 (3–3)	Mullins Center (1,248); Amherst, MA
Jan 30, 2019; 6:00 pm, ESPN+		at VCU	L 48–52	11–10 (3–4)	Siegel Center (523); Richmond, VA
Feb 3, 2019; 12:00 pm, ESPN+		at Richmond	L 58–62	11–11 (3–5)	Robins Center (576); Richmond, VA
Feb 7, 2019; 7:00 pm, ESPN+		Duquesne	W 69–66	12–11 (4–5)	Mullins Center (509); Amherst, MA
Feb 10, 2019; 2:00 pm, ESPN+		Rhode Island	W 56–34	13–11 (5–5)	Mullins Center (656); Amherst, MA
Feb 13, 2019; 7:00 pm, ESPN+		at Saint Joseph's	L 54–55	13–12 (5–6)	Hagan Arena (204); Philadelphia, PA
Feb 16, 2019; 2:00 pm, ESPN+		Davidson	L 49–64	13–13 (5–7)	Mullins Center (775); Amherst, MA
Feb 20, 2019; 7:00 pm, ESPN+		George Washington	L 59–66	13–14 (5–8)	Mullins Center (673); Amherst, MA
Feb 24, 2019; 2:00 pm, ESPN+		at Fordham	L 64–76	13–15 (5–9)	Rose Hill Gymnasium (1,008); Bronx, NY
Feb 27, 2019; 7:00 pm, ESPN+		Richmond	W 64–38	14–15 (5–10)	Mullins Center (541); Amherst, MA
Mar 2, 2019; 2:00 pm, ESPN+		at Rhode Island	W 57–53	15–15 (5–11)	Ryan Center (411); Kingston, RI
Atlantic 10 Women's Tournament
Mar 5, 2019; 12:00 pm, ESPN+	(10)	at (7) George Mason; First Round	W 86–80 ^{2OT}	16–15	EagleBank Arena (259); Fairfax, VA
Mar 8, 2019; 4:30 pm, ESPN+	(10)	vs. (2) Fordham; Quarterfinals	L 62–73	16–16	Palumbo Center; Pittsburgh, PA
*Non-conference game. ^{#}Rankings from AP Poll. (#) Tournament seedings in parentheses. All times are in Eastern Time.

== Rankings ==
2018–19 NCAA Division I women's basketball rankings

Regular season polls
Poll	Pre- Season	Week 2	Week 3	Week 4	Week 5	Week 6	Week 7	Week 8	Week 9	Week 10	Week 11	Week 12	Week 13	Week 14	Week 15	Week 16	Week 17	Week 18	Week 19	Final
AP																				N/A
Coaches																				

Legend
	Increase in ranking
	Decrease in ranking
	No change
(RV)	Received votes
(NR)	Not ranked

== See also ==
- 2018–19 UMass Minutemen basketball team
