= 2018–19 VCU Rams women's basketball team =

Intercollegiate basketball season

2018–19 VCU Rams women's basketball

Atlantic 10 regular season co-champions

WNIT, Second Round
- Conference: Atlantic 10 Conference
- Record: 24–10 (13–3 A-10)
- Head coach: Beth O'Boyle (5th season)
- Assistant coaches: Nerlande Nicolas; Kirk Crawford; Terry Zeh
- Home arena: Siegel Center

2018–19 Atlantic 10 women's basketball standings
	Conf.				Overall
Team	W		L	PCT	W		L	PCT
Fordham †	13	–	3	.813	25	–	9	.735
VCU	13	–	3	.813	24	–	10	.706
Duquesne	11	–	5	.688	19	–	13	.594
Dayton	10	–	6	.625	17	–	14	.548
Davidson	10	–	6	.625	17	–	15	.531
Saint Louis	9	–	7	.563	15	–	16	.484
George Mason	8	–	8	.500	16	–	14	.533
Massachusetts	7	–	9	.438	16	–	16	.500
Saint Joseph's	7	–	9	.438	12	–	19	.387
George Washington	7	–	9	.438	10	–	20	.333
Richmond	6	–	10	.375	9	–	21	.300
St. Bonaventure	5	–	11	.313	8	–	22	.267
La Salle	3	–	13	.188	6	–	25	.194
Rhode Island	3	–	13	.188	8	–	21	.276
† 2019 A10 tournament winner Rankings from AP poll

The 2018–19 VCU Rams women's basketball team represented Virginia Commonwealth University during the 2018–19 NCAA Division I women's basketball season. The Rams were led by fifth year head coach Beth O'Boyle. The Rams were members of the Atlantic 10 Conference and played their home games at the Stuart C. Siegel Center. They finished the season 24–10, 13–3 in A-10 play to share the regular season title with Fordham. They advanced to the championship game of the A-10 women's tournament, where they lost to Fordham. They received an automatic bid to the WNIT, where they defeated Charlotte in the first round before losing to Virginia Tech in the second round.

== Roster ==
2018–19 VCU Rams women's basketball team
Players
Coaches

Pos.	#	Name	Height	Year	Previous school	Hometown
G	0	Te'Kayla Tassin	5 ft 9 in (1.75 m)	Jr	Terry; Jones County JC	Byram, MS
G	1	Taya Robinson	5 ft 10 in (1.78 m)	So	Huguenot	Richmond, VA
G	3	Madison Hattix-Covington	5 ft 10 in (1.78 m)	RS Fr	Ellison	Killeen, TX
G	5	Olga Petrova	5 ft 8 in (1.73 m)	So	None	Rostov-on-Don, Russia
F	11	Kseniya Malashka	6 ft 0 in (1.83 m)	So	None	Minsk, Belarus
C	15	Sofya Pashigoreva	6 ft 6 in (1.98 m)	So	None	Moscow, Russia
G	20	Jailyn Maddox	5 ft 10 in (1.78 m)	Jr	Hoover	Hoover, AL
F	22	Sydnei Archie	5 ft 10 in (1.78 m)	So	St. Catherine's	Richmond, VA
G	23	Jordan Agustus	6 ft 0 in (1.83 m)	RS So	Saint Mary's; St. John's	Bronx, NY
G	24	Tera Reed	6 ft 0 in (1.83 m)	So	Life Center Academy	New Zealand
F	25	Lauryn Thompson	6 ft 2 in (1.88 m)	Fr	Mansfield Timberview	Arlington, TX
C	30	Danielle Hammond	6 ft 4 in (1.93 m)	Jr	Baldwin School	Philadelphia, PA
G	34	Nyra Williams	5 ft 5 in (1.65 m)	Jr	Bethel	Hampton, VA
G	42	Niya Johnson	5 ft 8 in (1.73 m)	RS So	Nazareth	Brooklyn, NY

Head coach

- Beth O'Boyle (Gettysburg)

Assistant coach(es)

- Nerlande Nicholas (Rutgers–Newark)
- Kirk Crawford (Western Colorado)
- Terry Zeh (St. Bonaventure)

Legend

- (C) Team captain
- (S) Suspended
- (I) Ineligible
- (W) Walk-on
- Injured
- Current redshirt

Roster

== Schedule ==
Date time, TV	Rank^{#}	Opponent^{#}	Result	Record	Site (attendance) city, state
Non-conference regular season
Nov 6, 2018*; 7:00 pm		at William & Mary	W 72–55	1–0	Kaplan Arena (684); Williamsburg, VA
Nov 9, 2018*; 11:00 am, ESPN+		Longwood	W 84–55	2–0	Siegel Center (3,729); Richmond, VA
Nov 14, 2018*; 11:00 am, ACCN Extra		at North Carolina	L 47–59	2–1	Carmichael Arena (2,893); Chapel Hill, NC
Nov 18, 2018*; 6:00 pm		Wake Forest	W 53–40	3–1	Siegel Center (753); Richmond, VA
Nov 23, 2018*; 6:00 pm		vs. Weber State; UTSA Thanksgiving Classic	W 64–36	4–1	Convocation Center (226); San Antonio, TX
Nov 25, 2018*; 1:00 pm		vs. IUPUI; UTSA Thanksgiving Classic	L 61–63	4–2	Convocation Center (261); San Antonio, TX
Nov 28, 2018*; 6:00 pm		UNC Wilmington	W 58–47	5–2	Siegel Center (536); Richmond, VA
Dec 2, 2018*; 2:00 pm		at Georgetown	W 47–45	6–2	McDonough Gymnasium (377); Washington, D.C.
Dec 7, 2018*; 7:00 pm		at Cincinnati	L 54–66	6–3	Fifth Third Arena (747); Cincinnati, OH
Dec 16, 2018*; 2:00 pm		at Old Dominion	L 57–60	6–4	Ted Constant Convocation Center (2,259); Norfolk, VA
Dec 19, 2018*; 6:00 pm		Radford	L 49–54	6–5	Siegel Center (654); Richmond, VA
Dec 21, 2018*; 2:00 pm		at North Carolina A&T	W 54–48	7–5	Corbett Sports Center (324); Greensboro, NC
Dec 31, 2018*; 1:00 pm		Delaware State	W 97–55	8–5	Siegel Center (537); Richmond, VA
A-10 regular season
Jan 5, 2019; 1:00 pm, ESPN+		Saint Joseph's	W 59–40	9–5 (1–0)	Siegel Center (463); Richmond, VA
Jan 8, 2019; 6:00 pm, ESPN+		La Salle	W 68–38	10–5 (2–0)	Siegel Center (412); Richmond, VA
Jan 12, 2019; 1:00 pm, ESPN+		at Richmond; Capital City Classic	W 68–43	11–5 (3–0)	Robins Center (1,393); Richmond, VA
Jan 16, 2019; 7:00 pm, ESPN+		at Fordham	W 47–44	12–5 (4–0)	Rose Hill Gymnasium (975); Bronx, NY
Jan 20, 2019; 1:00 pm, ESPN+		Rhode Island	W 74–39	13–5 (5–0)	Siegel Center (722); Richmond, VA
Jan 23, 2019; 7:00 pm, ESPN+		at George Washington	L 48–57	13–6 (5–1)	Charles E. Smith Center (794); Washington, D.C.
Jan 27, 2019; 1:00 pm, ESPN+		Saint Louis	W 57–47	14–6 (6–1)	Siegel Center (1,263); Richmond, VA
Jan 30, 2019; 1:00 pm, ESPN+		Massachusetts	W 52–48	15–6 (7–1)	Siegel Center (523); Richmond, VA
Feb 3, 2019; 2:00 pm, ESPN+		at Saint Joseph's	W 65–47	16–6 (8–1)	Hagan Arena (781); Philadelphia, PA
Feb 6, 2019; 7:00 pm, ESPN+		at St. Bonaventure	W 59–50	17–6 (9–1)	Reilly Center (659); Olean, NY
Feb 9, 2019; 6:00 pm, ESPN+/CBS 6.3		Richmond; Capital City Classic	W 58–37	18–6 (10–1)	Siegel Center (2,036); Richmond, VA
Feb 14, 2019; 6:00 pm, ESPN+		Dayton	W 64–62	19–6 (11–1)	Siegel Center (585); Richmond, VA
Feb 17, 2019; 2:00 pm, ESPN+		at George Mason; Rivalry	W 62–38	20–6 (12–1)	EagleBank Arena (2,725); Fairfax, VA
Feb 23, 2019; 2:00 pm, ESPN+		at Duquesne	L 68–71 ^{OT}	20–7 (12–2)	Palumbo Center (926); Pittsburgh, PA
Feb 27, 2019; 8:00 pm, ESPN+		at Saint Louis	L 60–76	20–8 (12–3)	Chaifetz Arena (637); St. Louis, MO
Mar 2, 2019; 1:00 pm, ESPN+		Davidson	W 61–54	21–8 (13–3)	Siegel Center (1,261); Richmond, VA
Atlantic 10 Women's Tournament
Mar 8, 2019; 11:00 am, ESPN+	(1)	vs. (8) Saint Joseph's; Quarterfinals	W 58–47	22–8	Palumbo Center; Pittsburgh, PA
Mar 9, 2019; 11:00 am, CBSSN	(1)	vs. (4) Dayton; Semifinals	W 61–52	23–8	Palumbo Center; Pittsburgh, PA
Mar 10, 2019; 12:00 pm, ESPNU	(1)	vs. (2) Fordham; Championship Game	L 47–62	23–9	Palumbo Center; Pittsburgh, PA
WNIT
Mar 21, 2019*; 6:00 pm		Charlotte; First round	W 65–52	24–9	Siegel Center (383); Richmond, VA
Mar 24, 2019*; 2:00 pm		at Virginia Tech; Second round	L 72–82	24–10	Cassell Coliseum (781); Blacksburg, VA
*Non-conference game. ^{#}Rankings from AP Poll. (#) Tournament seedings in parentheses. All times are in Eastern Time.

== Rankings ==
2018–19 NCAA Division I women's basketball rankings

Regular season polls
Poll	Pre- Season	Week 2	Week 3	Week 4	Week 5	Week 6	Week 7	Week 8	Week 9	Week 10	Week 11	Week 12	Week 13	Week 14	Week 15	Week 16	Week 17	Week 18	Week 19	Final
AP																				N/A
Coaches																				

Legend
	Increase in ranking
	Decrease in ranking
	No change
(RV)	Received votes
(NR)	Not ranked

== See also ==
- 2018–19 VCU Rams men's basketball team
