= 2018–19 Saint Joseph's Hawks women's basketball team =

Intercollegiate basketball season

2018–19 Saint Joseph's Hawks women's basketball
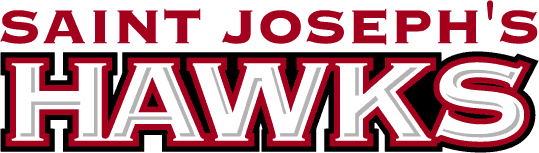
- Conference: Atlantic 10 Conference
- Record: 12–19 (7–9 A-10)
- Head coach: Cindy Griffin (18th season)
- Assistant coaches: Susan Moran; John Hampton; Katie Kuester
- Home arena: Hagan Arena

2018–19 Atlantic 10 women's basketball standings
| | Conf. | | | | Overall |
| Team | W | | L | PCT | W | | L | PCT |
|---|---|---|---|---|---|---|---|---|
| Fordham † | 13 | – | 3 | .813 | 25 | – | 9 | .735 |
| VCU | 13 | – | 3 | .813 | 24 | – | 10 | .706 |
| Duquesne | 11 | – | 5 | .688 | 19 | – | 13 | .594 |
| Dayton | 10 | – | 6 | .625 | 17 | – | 14 | .548 |
| Davidson | 10 | – | 6 | .625 | 17 | – | 15 | .531 |
| Saint Louis | 9 | – | 7 | .563 | 15 | – | 16 | .484 |
| George Mason | 8 | – | 8 | .500 | 16 | – | 14 | .533 |
| Massachusetts | 7 | – | 9 | .438 | 16 | – | 16 | .500 |
| Saint Joseph's | 7 | – | 9 | .438 | 12 | – | 19 | .387 |
| George Washington | 7 | – | 9 | .438 | 10 | – | 20 | .333 |
| Richmond | 6 | – | 10 | .375 | 9 | – | 21 | .300 |
| St. Bonaventure | 5 | – | 11 | .313 | 8 | – | 22 | .267 |
| La Salle | 3 | – | 13 | .188 | 6 | – | 25 | .194 |
| Rhode Island | 3 | – | 13 | .188 | 8 | – | 21 | .276 |
† 2019 A10 tournament winner Rankings from AP poll

The 2018–19 Saint Joseph's Hawks women's basketball team represented the Saint Joseph's University during the 2018–19 NCAA Division I women's basketball season. The Hawks, led by eighteenth-year head coach Cindy Griffin, played their home games at Hagan Arena and were members of the Atlantic 10 Conference (A-10). They finished the season 12–19, 7–9 in A-10 play, to finish in a three-way tie for eighth place. They advanced to the quarterfinals of the A-10 women's tournament where they lost VCU.

== Media ==
All non-televised Hawks home games aired on the A-10 Digital Network. All Hawks games were streamed via the Saint Joseph's Sports Network on sjuhawks.com.

== Roster ==
2018–19 Saint Joseph's Hawks women's basketball team
Players
Coaches

| Pos. | # | Name | Height | Year | Previous school | Hometown |
|---|---|---|---|---|---|---|
| F | 0 | Ashlyn Wert | 6 ft 5 in (1.96 m) | RS Sr | J. P. McCaskey; Chattanooga | Lancaster, PA |
| F | 1 | Whisper Fisher | 6 ft 2 in (1.88 m) | RS Jr | Owings Mills; Loyola Chicago | Owings Mills, MD |
| G | 2 | Lula Roig | 5 ft 9 in (1.75 m) | So | IES Costa I Llobera | Barcelona, Spain |
| G | 3 | Nailah Delinois | 5 ft 9 in (1.75 m) | RS So | Northeast | Sunrise, FL |
| G | 4 | Kristalyn Baisden | 5 ft 10 in (1.78 m) | Sr | Berkshire School | East Hartford, CT |
| F | 5 | Elizabeth Marsicano | 6 ft 1 in (1.85 m) | Fr | St. Rose | Manasquan, NJ |
| G | 11 | Avery Marz | 5 ft 7 in (1.7 m) | RS Sr | Wilson West Lawn | Sinking Spring, PA |
| G | 12 | Alyssa Monaghan | 5 ft 5 in (1.65 m) | Sr | Bonner Prendergast | Drexel Hill, PA |
| G | 13 | Mary Sheehan | 5 ft 10 in (1.78 m) | So | Cardinal O'Hara | Drexel Hill, PA |
| G | 14 | Katie Jekot | 5 ft 9 in (1.75 m) | RS Fr | Cumberland Valley | Enola, PA |
| G | 20 | Rachel Gartner | 5 ft 8 in (1.73 m) | RS Sr | Danbury; Boston College | Danbury, CT |
| G | 22 | Devyne Newman | 5 ft 8 in (1.73 m) | Fr | Herndon | Herndon, VA |
| G | 30 | Sarah Veilleux | 6 ft 0 in (1.83 m) | RS Sr | RHAM | Hebron, CT |
| F | 33 | Katie Mayock | 6 ft 2 in (1.88 m) | Fr | Conestoga | Berwyn, PA |
| F | 35 | Michala Clay | 6 ft 0 in (1.83 m) | Sr | Roland Park Country School | Baltimore, MD |

Head coach

- Cindy Griffin (Saint Joseph's)

Assistant coach(es)

- Susan Moran (Saint Joseph's)
- John Hampton (Mansfield)
- Katie Kuester (Saint Joseph's)

Legend

- (C) Team captain
- (S) Suspended
- (I) Ineligible
- (W) Walk-on
- Injured
- Current redshirt

Roster
Last update: June 26, 2024

== Schedule ==
| Date time, TV | Rank^{#} | Opponent^{#} | Result | Record | Site (attendance) city, state |
Non-conference regular season
| November 9, 2018*; 5:00 p.m., ESPN+ | | Temple; Rivalry | L 52–58 | 0–1 | Hagan Arena; Philadelphia, PA |
| November 11, 2018*; 2:00 p.m. | | at Drexel | L 34–51 | 0–2 | Daskalakis Athletic Center (1,004); Philadelphia, PA |
| November 15, 2018*; 7:00 p.m. | | at Penn | L 45–65 | 0–3 | The Palestra (354); Philadelphia, PA |
| November 20, 2018*; 7:00 p.m., ESPN+ | | Niagara | W 68–54 | 1–3 | Hagan Arena (658); Philadelphia, PA |
| November 24, 2018*; 12:00 p.m., ESPN+ | | Rider; Hawk Classic semifinals | L 54–56 | 1–4 | Hagan Arena (737); Philadelphia, PA |
| November 25, 2018*; 2:00 p.m., ESPN+ | | Loyola (MD); Hawk Classic 3rd-place game | W 49–46 | 2–4 | Hagan Arena (413); Philadelphia, PA |
| November 29, 2018*; 7:00 p.m., ESPN+ | | Columbia | W 68–61 ^{OT} | 3–4 | Hagan Arena (493); Philadelphia, PA |
| December 2, 2018*; 2:00 p.m., ESPN+ | | Villanova; Holy War | L 35–47 | 3–5 | Hagan Arena (1,138); Philadelphia, PA |
| December 6, 2018*; 7:00 p.m., ESPN+ | | Auburn | L 70–81 | 3–6 | Hagan Arena (443); Philadelphia, PA |
| December 10, 2018*; 7:00 p.m., ESPN+ | | Towson | L 52–73 | 3–7 | Hagan Arena (354); Philadelphia, PA |
| December 20, 2018*; 11:00 a.m. | | at Sacred Heart | W 61–44 | 4–7 | William H. Pitt Center (909); Fairfield, CT |
| December 28, 2018*; 7:00 p.m. | | at Delaware | L 39–48 | 4–8 | Bob Carpenter Center (1,368); Newark, DE |
| December 31, 2018*; 6:00 p.m. | | at Navy | L 48–49 | 4–9 | Alumni Hall (358); Annapolis, MD |
Atlantic 10 regular season
| January 5, 2019; 1:00 p.m., ESPN+ | | at VCU | L 40–59 | 4–10 (0–1) | Siegel Center (463); Richmond, VA |
| January 9, 2019; 11:30 a.m., ESPN+ | | Saint Louis | L 49–62 | 4–11 (0–2) | Hagan Arena (889); Philadelphia, PA |
| January 13, 2019; 2:00 p.m., ESPN+ | | St. Bonaventure | W 66–41 | 5–11 (1–2) | Hagan Arena (428); Philadelphia, PA |
| January 16, 2019; 7:00 p.m., ESPN+ | | at Duquesne | L 73–81 | 5–12 (1–3) | Palumbo Center (812); Pittsburgh, PA |
| January 20, 2019; 4:00 p.m., CBSSN | | La Salle | W 60–57 | 6–12 (2–3) | Hagan Arena (903); Philadelphia, PA |
| January 23, 2019; 7:00 p.m., ESPN+ | | at Richmond | L 45–46 | 6–13 (2–4) | Robins Center (551); Richmond, VA |
| January 27, 2019; 12:00 p.m., ESPNU | | at Dayton | L 65–72 ^{OT} | 6–14 (2–5) | UD Arena (2,211); Dayton, OH |
| February 3, 2019; 2:00 p.m., ESPN+ | | VCU | L 47–65 | 6–15 (2–6) | Hagan Arena (781); Philadelphia, PA |
| February 6, 2019; 7:00 p.m., ESPN+ | | Davidson | W 66–54 | 7–15 (3–6) | Hagan Arena (231); Philadelphia, PA |
| February 10, 2019; 12:00 p.m., ESPN+ | | at George Washington | W 41–38 | 8–15 (4–6) | Charles E. Smith Center (1,055); Washington, D.C. |
| February 13, 2019; 7:00 p.m., ESPN+ | | Massachusetts | W 55–54 | 9–15 (5–6) | Hagan Arena (204); Philadelphia, PA |
| February 17, 2019; 2:00 p.m., ESPN+ | | at La Salle | W 64–63 | 10–15 (6–6) | Tom Gola Arena (639); Philadelphia, PA |
| February 20, 2019; 7:00 p.m., ESPN+ | | Duquesne | L 56–67 | 10–16 (6–7) | Hagan Arena (189); Philadelphia, PA |
| February 24, 2019; 2:00 p.m., ESPN+ | | at Rhode Island | W 55–48 | 11–16 (7–7) | Ryan Center (620); Kingston, RI |
| February 27, 2019; 4:00 p.m., ESPN+ | | at George Mason | L 59–68 | 11–17 (7–8) | EagleBank Arena (700); Fairfax, VA |
| March 2, 2019; 12:00 p.m., ESPN+ | | Fordham | L 41–51 | 11–18 (7–9) | Hagan Arena (557); Philadelphia, PA |
Atlantic 10 women's tournament
| March 5, 2019; 3:00 p.m., ESPN+ | (8) | (9) George Washington; First round | W 61–49 | 12–18 | Hagan Arena (278); Philadelphia, PA |
| March 8, 2019; 11:00 a.m., ESPN+ | (8) | vs. (1) VCU; Quarterfinals | L 47–58 | 12–19 | Palumbo Center; Pittsburgh, PA |
*Non-conference game. ^{#}Rankings from AP poll. (#) Tournament seedings in parentheses. All times are in Eastern.

== Rankings ==
Regular-season polls
| Poll | Pre- season | Week 2 | Week 3 | Week 4 | Week 5 | Week 6 | Week 7 | Week 8 | Week 9 | Week 10 | Week 11 | Week 12 | Week 13 | Week 14 | Week 15 | Week 16 | Week 17 | Week 18 | Week 19 | Final |
|---|---|---|---|---|---|---|---|---|---|---|---|---|---|---|---|---|---|---|---|---|
| AP | | | | | | | | | | | | | | | | | | | | N/A |
| Coaches | | | | | | | | | | | | | | | | | | | | |

Legend
| | Increase in ranking |
| | Decrease in ranking |
| | No change |
| (RV) | Received votes |
| (NR) | Not ranked |

== See also ==
- 2018–19 Saint Joseph's Hawks men's basketball team
