= 2018–19 George Washington Colonials women's basketball team =

Intercollegiate basketball season

2018–19 George Washington Colonials women's basketball
- Conference: Atlantic 10 Conference
- Record: 10–20 (7–9 A-10)
- Head coach: Jennifer Rizzotti (3rd season)
- Assistant coaches: Ganiyat Adeduntan; Kevin DeMille; Bill Sullivan
- Home arena: Charles E. Smith Center

2018–19 Atlantic 10 women's basketball standings
	Conf.				Overall
Team	W		L	PCT	W		L	PCT
Fordham †	13	–	3	.813	25	–	9	.735
VCU	13	–	3	.813	24	–	10	.706
Duquesne	11	–	5	.688	19	–	13	.594
Dayton	10	–	6	.625	17	–	14	.548
Davidson	10	–	6	.625	17	–	15	.531
Saint Louis	9	–	7	.563	15	–	16	.484
George Mason	8	–	8	.500	16	–	14	.533
Massachusetts	7	–	9	.438	16	–	16	.500
Saint Joseph's	7	–	9	.438	12	–	19	.387
George Washington	7	–	9	.438	10	–	20	.333
Richmond	6	–	10	.375	9	–	21	.300
St. Bonaventure	5	–	11	.313	8	–	22	.267
La Salle	3	–	13	.188	6	–	25	.194
Rhode Island	3	–	13	.188	8	–	21	.276
† 2019 A10 tournament winner Rankings from AP poll

The 2018–19 George Washington Colonials women's basketball team represented George Washington University during the 2018–19 NCAA Division I women's basketball season. The Colonials, led by third year head coach Jennifer Rizzotti, played their home games at Charles E. Smith Center and were members of the Atlantic 10 Conference. They finished the season 10–20, 7–9 in A-10 play to finish in a 3 way tie for eighth place. They lost in the first round of the A-10 women's tournament to Saint Joseph's.

== Media ==
WRGW will carry the Colonials games and broadcast them online at GWRadio.com. The A-10 Digital Network will carry all non-televised Colonials home games and most conference road games through RaiseHigh Live.

== Roster ==
2018–19 George Washington Colonials women's basketball team
Players
Coaches

Pos.	#	Name	Height	Year	Previous school	Hometown
F	1	Kelsi Mahoney	6 ft 1 in (1.85 m)	Sr	Jay M. Robinson	Concord, NC
G	3	Anna Savino (W)	5 ft 7 in (1.7 m)	Sr	The Ursuline School	Bronx, NY
G	4	Lexus Levy	5 ft 6 in (1.68 m)	So	Seton Catholic Central	Binghamton, NY
F	5	Chyna Latimer	6 ft 0 in (1.83 m)	So	Patterson Mill	Bel Air, MD
G	10	Sydney Zambrotta (redshirt)	5 ft 9 in (1.75 m)	Jr	Christ the King; Louisville	North Babylon, NY
G	11	Tori Hyduke	5 ft 6 in (1.68 m)	Fr	Rumson-Fair Haven	Rumson, NJ
F	12	Olivia Gumbs	6 ft 1 in (1.85 m)	RS So	St. Andrew's School; Lafayette	Newark, DE
F	20	Sarah Overcash	6 ft 1 in (1.85 m)	RS So	St. John's College; Illinois	Chevy Chase, MD
G	21	Mei-Lyn Bautista	5 ft 6 in (1.68 m)	Sr	St. Mary's	Whitestone, NY
G	22	Maddie Loder	5 ft 11 in (1.8 m)	Fr	Orono	Orono, MN
C	24	Kayla Mokwuah	6 ft 4 in (1.93 m)	Fr	Wilbraham & Monson Academy	Longmeadow, MA
F	30	Neila Luma	6 ft 0 in (1.83 m)	So	Bethlehem Catholic	Macungie, PA
F	31	Mayowa Taiwo	6 ft 0 in (1.83 m)	Fr	Rockbridge Academy	Hanover, MD

Head coach

- Jennifer Rizzotti (Connecticut)

Assistant coach(es)

- Ganiyat Adeduntan (Florida State)
- Kevin DeMille (Connecticut)
- Bill Sullivan (Connecticut)

Legend

- (C) Team captain
- (S) Suspended
- (I) Ineligible
- (W) Walk-on
- Injured
- Current redshirt

Roster

== Schedule ==
Date time, TV	Rank^{#}	Opponent^{#}	Result	Record	Site (attendance) city, state
Non-conference regular season
Nov 8, 2018*; 7:00 pm		at James Madison	L 37–50	0–1	JMU Convocation Center (1,898); Harrisonburg, VA
Nov 11, 2018*; 2:00 pm, ESPN+		Princeton	W 64–49	1–1	Charles E. Smith Center (1,528); Washington, D.C.
Nov 14, 2018*; 7:00 pm, ESPN+		No. 9 Maryland	L 30–69	1–2	Charles E. Smith Center (1,170); Washington, D.C.
Nov 18, 2018*; 1:00 pm, ESPN+		at Iona	L 43–52	1–3	Hynes Athletic Center (847); New Rochelle, NY
Nov 22, 2018*; 4:00 pm		vs. Georgia Tech; Cancún Challenge Riviera Division	L 55–70	1–4	Hard Rock Hotel Riviera Maya (300); Cancún, Mexico
Nov 23, 2018*; 4:00 pm		vs. No. 15 NC State; Cancún Challenge Riviera Division	L 61–69	1–5	Hard Rock Hotel Riviera Maya (300); Cancún, Mexico
Nov 27, 2018*; 7:00 pm, ESPN+		Towson	W 76–63	2–5	Charles E. Smith Center (715); Washington, D.C.
Dec 2, 2018*; 7:00 pm, ESPN+		Monmouth	L 51–55	2–6	Charles E. Smith Center (776); Washington, D.C.
Dec 6, 2018*; 7:00 pm, ESPN+		Villanova	L 45–60	2–7	Charles E. Smith Center (884); Washington, D.C.
Dec 9, 2018*; 2:00 pm		at South Florida	L 30–63	2–8	Yuengling Center (2,081); Tampa, FL
Dec 21, 2018*; 12:00 pm, ESPN+		Mercer	L 53–61	2–9	Charles E. Smith Center (714); Washington, D.C.
Dec 29, 2018*; 2:00 pm		at William & Mary	L 59–73	2–10	Kaplan Arena (611); Williamsburg, VA
Jan 1, 2019*; 2:00 pm, ESPN+		Memphis	W 51–38	3–10	Charles E. Smith Center (751); Washington, D.C.
Atlantic 10 regular season
Jan 5, 2019; 11:00 am, CBSSN		Fordham	L 38–50	3–11 (0–1)	Charles E. Smith Center (858); Washington, D.C.
Jan 9, 2019; 7:00 pm, ESPN+		at Rhode Island	W 64–59	4–11 (1–1)	Ryan Center (371); Kingston, RI
Jan 12, 2019; 12:00 pm, ESPN+		Dayton	W 46–45	5–11 (2–1)	Charles E. Smith Center (866); Washington, D.C.
Jan 16, 2019; 5:00 pm, ESPN+		at La Salle	W 67–59	6–11 (3–1)	Tom Gola Arena (387); Philadelphia, PA
Jan 19, 2019; 2:00 pm, ESPN+		George Mason; Revolutionary Rivalry	L 60–64	6–12 (3–2)	Charles E. Smith Center (1,003); Washington, D.C.
Jan 23, 2019; 7:00 pm, ESPN+		VCU	W 57–48	7–12 (4–2)	Charles E. Smith Center (794); Washington, D.C.
Jan 27, 2019; 2:00 pm, ESPN+		at Duquesne	W 55–54	8–12 (5–2)	Palumbo Center (1,160); Pittsburgh, PA
Jan 31, 2019; 12:00 pm, ESPN+		Davidson	L 42–62	8–13 (5–3)	Charles E. Smith Center (1,667); Washington, D.C.
Feb 3, 2019; 2:00 pm, CBSSN		at Saint Louis	L 44–60	8–14 (5–4)	Chaifetz Arena (746); St. Louis, MO
Feb 6, 2019; 7:00 pm, ESPN+		at George Mason; Revolutionary Rivalry	L 46–61	8–15 (5–5)	EagleBank Arena (1,468); Fairfax, VA
Feb 10, 2019; 2:00 pm, ESPN+		Saint Joseph's	L 38–41	8–16 (5–6)	Charles E. Smith Center (1,055); Washington, D.C.
Feb 17, 2019; 12:00 pm, ESPNU		at Dayton	L 53–62	8–17 (5–7)	UD Arena (2,699); Dayton, OH
Feb 20, 2019; 7:00 pm, ESPN+		at Massachusetts	W 66–59	9–17 (6–7)	Mullins Center (673); Amherst, MA
Feb 24, 2019; 12:00 pm, ESPN+		St. Bonaventure	W 57–44	10–17 (6–8)	Charles E. Smith Center (976); Washington, D.C.
Feb 27, 2019; 7:00 pm, ESPN+		Duquesne	L 53–64	10–18 (6–9)	Charles E. Smith Center (998); Washington, D.C.
Mar 2, 2019; 11:00 am, ESPN+		at Richmond	L 48–56	10–19 (6–10)	Robins Center (629); Richmond, VA
Atlantic 10 Women's Tournament
Mar 5, 2019; 3:00 pm, ESPN+	(9)	at (8) Saint Joseph's; First Round	L 49–61	10–20	Hagan Arena (278); Philadelphia, PA
*Non-conference game. ^{#}Rankings from AP Poll. (#) Tournament seedings in parentheses. All times are in Eastern Time.

== Rankings ==
2018–19 NCAA Division I women's basketball rankings

Regular season polls
Poll	Pre- Season	Week 2	Week 3	Week 4	Week 5	Week 6	Week 7	Week 8	Week 9	Week 10	Week 11	Week 12	Week 13	Week 14	Week 15	Week 16	Week 17	Week 18	Week 19	Final
AP																				N/A
Coaches																				

Legend
	Increase in ranking
	Decrease in ranking
	No change
(RV)	Received votes
(NR)	Not ranked

== See also ==
- 2018–19 George Washington Colonials men's basketball team
