= 2018–19 Rhode Island Rams women's basketball team =

Intercollegiate basketball season

2018–19 Rhode Island Rams women's basketball

Ocean State Tip-Off Tournament Champions
- Conference: Atlantic 10 Conference
- Record: 8–21 (3–13 A-10)
- Head coach: Daynia La-Force (5th season)
- Assistant coaches: Marcus Reilly; Mike Geary; Clyde Manns
- Home arena: Ryan Center

2018–19 Atlantic 10 women's basketball standings
	Conf.				Overall
Team	W		L	PCT	W		L	PCT
Fordham †	13	–	3	.813	25	–	9	.735
VCU	13	–	3	.813	24	–	10	.706
Duquesne	11	–	5	.688	19	–	13	.594
Dayton	10	–	6	.625	17	–	14	.548
Davidson	10	–	6	.625	17	–	15	.531
Saint Louis	9	–	7	.563	15	–	16	.484
George Mason	8	–	8	.500	16	–	14	.533
Massachusetts	7	–	9	.438	16	–	16	.500
Saint Joseph's	7	–	9	.438	12	–	19	.387
George Washington	7	–	9	.438	10	–	20	.333
Richmond	6	–	10	.375	9	–	21	.300
St. Bonaventure	5	–	11	.313	8	–	22	.267
La Salle	3	–	13	.188	6	–	25	.194
Rhode Island	3	–	13	.188	8	–	21	.276
† 2019 A10 tournament winner Rankings from AP poll

The 2018–19 Rhode Island Rams women's basketball team represented the University of Rhode Island during the 2018–19 NCAA Division I women's basketball season. The Rams were led by fifth year head coach Daynia La-Force. The Rams were members of the Atlantic 10 Conference and played their home games at the Ryan Center. They finished the season 8–21, 3–13 in A-10 to finish in a tie for last place. They lost in the first round of the A-10 women's tournament to Duquesne.

On March 12, Daynia La-Force was fired. She finished at Rhode Island with an 5-year record of 46–102.

== 2018–19 media ==
All Rams home games and most conference road games that aren't televised will be shown on the A-10 Digital Network.

== Roster ==
2018–19 Rhode Island Rams women's basketball team
Players
Coaches

Pos.	#	Name	Height	Year	Previous school	Hometown
G	1	Elemy Colome	5 ft 7 in (1.7 m)	RS Jr	Proctor Academy; James Madison	Lawrence, MA
F	2	Jalissa Ross	6 ft 2 in (1.88 m)	Sr	Fenway	Roxbury, MA
G	4	Laura Perez	5 ft 8 in (1.73 m)	RS Jr	CETYS Universidad	Baja California, Mexico
G	11	Davida Dale	5 ft 11 in (1.8 m)	RS So	St. Andrew's; Syracuse	Providence, RI
G	12	Maia Moffitt	5 ft 10 in (1.78 m)	So	St. Anthony's	Bay Shore, NY
G	13	Marta Vargas	5 ft 9 in (1.75 m)	So	Vergilio Ferreira	Amadora, Portugal
G	14	Erin Jones	6 ft 1 in (1.85 m)	RS So	Voorhees; Hartford	High Bridge, NJ
C	22	Gabrielle Green	6 ft 2 in (1.88 m)	RS So	Mt. Hebron	Ellicott City, MD
G	23	Kasey Gagan	5 ft 9 in (1.75 m)	So	St. Raphael Academy	Warwick, RI
G	30	Savannah Clark	6 ft 0 in (1.83 m)	Jr	Proviso East; Miami Dade	Maywood, IL
G	31	Abby Streeter	5 ft 11 in (1.8 m)	So	Lawrence Academy	Nashua, NH
C	32	Nicole Jorgensen	6 ft 5 in (1.96 m)	Jr	Quincy	Quincy, MA
F	33	Meghan Oberg	6 ft 3 in (1.91 m)	RS So	Islip	Islip, NY
C	34	Dina Motrechuk	6 ft 5 in (1.96 m)	Sr	Moore Catholic	Staten Island, NY
G	35	Jessica Rogers	6 ft 1 in (1.85 m)	RS Fr	Rutherford	Rutherford, NJ

Head coach

- Daynia La-Force (Georgetown)

Assistant coach(es)

- Marcus Reilly (Trinity (CT))
- Mike Geary (Aquinas (MI))
- Clyde Manns (Pitt–Greensburg)

Legend

- (C) Team captain
- (S) Suspended
- (I) Ineligible
- (W) Walk-on
- Injured
- Current redshirt

Roster

== Schedule ==
Date time, TV	Rank^{#}	Opponent^{#}	Result	Record	Site (attendance) city, state
Exhibition
Nov 4, 2018*; 2:00 pm		New Haven	W 66–61		Ryan Center; Kingston, RI
Non-conference regular season
Nov 8, 2018*; 7:00 pm		Boston College	L 64–88	0–1	Ryan Center (373); Kingston, RI
Nov 13, 2018*; 7:30 pm		at Robert Morris	W 46–41	1–1	North Athletic Complex (559); Moon Township, PA
Nov 18, 2018*; 2:00 pm		at Vermont	W 61–58	2–1	Patrick Gym (266); Burlington, VT
Nov 21, 2018*; 3:05 pm		at Holy Cross	L 65–73	2–2	Hart Center (775); Worcester, MA
Nov 27, 2018*; 7:00 pm		North Dakota	W 77–63	3–2	Ryan Center (259); Kingston, RI
Dec 1, 2018*; 12:00 pm		Providence; Ocean State Tip-Off Tournament semifinals	W 72–65	4–2	Ryan Center (426); Kingston, RI
Dec 2, 2018*; 2:00 pm		Brown; Ocean State Tip-Off Tournament championship	W 72–67	5–2	Ryan Center (420); Kingston, RI
Dec 6, 2018*; 7:00 pm		at No. 19 Kentucky	L 52–75	5–3	Memorial Coliseum (3,744); Lexington, KY
Dec 8, 2018*; 2:00 pm		at Clemson	L 64–83	5–4	Littlejohn Coliseum (564); Clemson, SC
Dec 11, 2018*; 7:00 pm		Hartford	L 51–65	5–5	Ryan Center (287); Kingston, RI
Dec 22, 2018*; 3:00 pm		at No. 13 Minnesota	L 71–91	5–6	Williams Arena (5,224); Minneapolis, MN
Dec 28, 2018*; 2:00 pm		Harvard	L 47–80	5–7	Ryan Center (545); Kingston, RI
Atlantic 10 regular season
Jan 5, 2019; 2:00 pm		at Richmond	W 66–60	6–7 (1–0)	Robins Center (659); Richmond, VA
Jan 9, 2019; 7:00 pm		George Washington	L 59–64	6–8 (1–1)	Ryan Center (371); Kingston, RI
Jan 12, 2019; 2:00 pm		Davidson	L 67–77	6–9 (1–2)	Ryan Center (440); Kingston, RI
Jan 16, 2019; 8:00 pm		at Saint Louis	W 68–56	7–9 (2–2)	Chaifetz Arena (313); St. Louis, MO
Jan 20, 2019; 8:00 pm		at VCU	L 39–74	7–10 (2–3)	Siegel Center (722); Richmond, VA
Jan 24, 2019; 7:00 pm		Fordham	L 38–56	7–11 (2–4)	Ryan Center (315); Kingston, RI
Jan 27, 2019; 2:00 pm		at George Mason	L 69–75	7–12 (2–5)	EagleBank Arena (1,158); Faifax, VA
Jan 30, 2019; 11:00 am		St. Bonaventure	L 68–84	7–13 (2–6)	Ryan Center (913); Kingston, RI
Feb 3, 2019; 1:00 pm		Dayton	L 62–74	7–14 (2–7)	Ryan Center (365); Kingston, RI
Feb 6, 2019; 11:00 am		at La Salle	L 71–77	7–15 (2–8)	Tom Gola Arena (726); Philadelphia, PA
Feb 10, 2019; 2:00 pm		at Massachusetts	L 34–56	7–16 (2–9)	Mullins Center (656); Amherst, MA
Feb 17, 2019; 1:00 pm, NBCSN		Duquesne	L 58–75	7–17 (2–10)	Ryan Center (692); Kingston, RI
Feb 21, 2019; 7:00 pm		at St. Bonaventure	L 61–62	7–18 (2–11)	Reilly Center (775); Olean, NY
Feb 24, 2019; 2:00 pm		Saint Joseph's	L 48–55	7–19 (2–12)	Ryan Center (620); Kingston, RI
Feb 27, 2019; 7:00 pm		at Davidson	W 64–58	8–19 (3–12)	John M. Belk Arena (421); Davidson, NC
Mar 2, 2019; 2:00 pm		Massachusetts	L 53–57	8–20 (3–13)	Ryan Center (411); Kingston, RI
Atlantic 10 Women's Tournament
Mar 5, 2019; 7:00 pm, ESPN+	(14)	at (3) Duquesne; First Round	L 69–106	8–21	Palumbo Center (601); Pittsburgh, PA
*Non-conference game. ^{#}Rankings from AP Poll. (#) Tournament seedings in parentheses. All times are in Eastern Time.

== See also ==
- 2018–19 Rhode Island Rams men's basketball team
