= 2018–19 St. Bonaventure Bonnies women's basketball team =

Intercollegiate basketball season

2018–19 St. Bonaventure Bonnies women's basketball
- Conference: Atlantic 10 Conference
- Record: 8–22 (5–11 A-10)
- Head coach: Jesse Fleming (3rd season)
- Assistant coaches: Jennifer Pruett; Maggie Serratelli; Ryan Phillips
- Home arena: Reilly Center

2018–19 Atlantic 10 women's basketball standings
	Conf.				Overall
Team	W		L	PCT	W		L	PCT
Fordham †	13	–	3	.813	25	–	9	.735
VCU	13	–	3	.813	24	–	10	.706
Duquesne	11	–	5	.688	19	–	13	.594
Dayton	10	–	6	.625	17	–	14	.548
Davidson	10	–	6	.625	17	–	15	.531
Saint Louis	9	–	7	.563	15	–	16	.484
George Mason	8	–	8	.500	16	–	14	.533
Massachusetts	7	–	9	.438	16	–	16	.500
Saint Joseph's	7	–	9	.438	12	–	19	.387
George Washington	7	–	9	.438	10	–	20	.333
Richmond	6	–	10	.375	9	–	21	.300
St. Bonaventure	5	–	11	.313	8	–	22	.267
La Salle	3	–	13	.188	6	–	25	.194
Rhode Island	3	–	13	.188	8	–	21	.276
† 2019 A10 tournament winner Rankings from AP poll

The 2018–19 St. Bonaventure Bonnies women's basketball team represented the St. Bonaventure University during the 2018–19 NCAA Division I women's basketball season. The Bonnies, led by third year head coach Jesse Fleming, played their home games at Reilly Center and were members of the Atlantic 10 Conference. They finished the season 8–22, 5–11 in A-10 play to finish in a tie for twelfth place. They lost in the first round of the A-10 women's tournament to Davidson.

== Media ==
All non-televised Bonnies home games air on the A-10 Digital Network. WGWE continue to be the radio broadcaster for the team. Chris Russell is the team's play-by-play voice; no color commentator is used.

== Roster ==
2018–19 St. Bonaventure Bonnies women's basketball team
Players
Coaches

Pos.	#	Name	Height	Year	Previous school	Hometown
G	2	Asianae Johnson	5 ft 8 in (1.73 m)	Fr	Grand St. Campus	Brooklyn, NY
G	3	Danielle Migliore	5 ft 7 in (1.7 m)	Jr	Frankfort-Schuyler	Frankfort, NY
G	10	McKenna Maycock	5 ft 9 in (1.75 m)	Sr	Randolph	Randolph, NY
G	11	Deja Francis	5 ft 7 in (1.7 m)	Fr	Murry Bertraum	Queens, NY
F	12	Amanda Oliver	6 ft 1 in (1.85 m)	Jr	Boone; Florida Southwestern CC	Orlando, FL
F	14	Carrie Jornlin	6 ft 3 in (1.91 m)	Fr	Mercersburg Academy	Hagerstown, MD
F	15	Emily Calabrese	6 ft 0 in (1.83 m)	So	Ramapo	Wyckoff, NJ
G	20	Dajah Logan	5 ft 11 in (1.8 m)	RS Jr	McDonogh; College of Charleston	Randallstown, MD
G	21	Claudia Del Moral	5 ft 6 in (1.68 m)	Jr	Lamar CC	Barcelona, Spain
F	23	Arielle Harvey	6 ft 0 in (1.83 m)	Sr	South Gwinnett; Daytona State	Atlanta, GA
G/F	24	Bree Paulson	6 ft 0 in (1.83 m)	RS Jr	Legacy; Western Nebraska CC	Broomfield, CO
F	33	Abigail Johnson	6 ft 2 in (1.88 m)	So	Barking Abbey	London, England

Head coach

- Jesse Fleming (St. Bonaventure)

Assistant coach(es)

- Maggie Serratelli (Holy Family)
- Jennifer Pruett (Ohio)
- Ryan Phillips (Guilford)

Legend

- (C) Team captain
- (S) Suspended
- (I) Ineligible
- (W) Walk-on
- Injured
- Current redshirt

Roster

== Schedule ==
Date time, TV	Rank^{#}	Opponent^{#}	Result	Record	Site (attendance) city, state
Exhibition
Nov 2, 2018*; 5:00 pm		Alfred	W 88–43		Reilly Center; Olean, NY
Non-conference regular season
Nov 6, 2018*; 7:00 pm		at Niagara	W 76–48	1–0	Gallagher Center (466); Lewiston, NY
Nov 9, 2018*; 6:00 pm		at No. 14 Georgia	L 40–67	1–1	Stegeman Coliseum (4,054); Athens, GA
Nov 13, 2018*; 7:00 pm, ESPN+		Canisius	W 100–94 ^{3OT}	2–1	Reilly Center (586); Olean, NY
Nov 17, 2018*; 2:00 pm, ESPN+		Hofstra	L 59–67	2–2	Reilly Center (705); Olean, NY
Nov 23, 2018*; 3:00 pm		vs. Ohio; Denver Thanksgiving Classic	L 53–70	2–3	Hamilton Gymnasium; Denver, CO
Nov 24, 2018*; 5:30 pm		at Denver; Denver Thanksgiving Classic	L 62–76	2–4	Hamilton Gymnasium (239); Denver, CO
Nov 29, 2018*; 7:00 pm, ESPN+		Bucknell	L 46–77	2–5	Reilly Center (486); Olean, NY
Dec 5, 2018*; 10:30 am		at Akron	L 58–67	2–6	James A. Rhodes Arena (1,652); Akron, OH
Dec 7, 2018*; 7:00 pm, ESPN+		Siena; Franciscan Cup	W 74–58	3–6	Reilly Center (487); Olean, NY
Dec 9, 2018*; 2:00 pm		at Penn State	L 65–80	3–7	Bryce Jordan Center (2,152); University Park, PA
Dec 17, 2018*; 7:00 pm, ESPN+		Kent State	L 64–76	3–8	Reilly Center (457); Olean, NY
Dec 23, 2018*; 2:30 pm, ESPN+		at Buffalo	L 43–90	3–9	Alumni Arena (1,994); Amherst, NY
Dec 31, 2018*; 2:30 pm		at Cornell	L 44–58	3–10	Newman Arena (376); Itahaca, NY
Atlantic 10 regular season
Jan 5, 2019; 1:00 pm, ESPN+		Duquesne	L 54–60	3–11 (0–1)	Reilly Center (655); Olean, NY
Jan 10, 2019; 7:00 pm		at George Mason	W 68–57	4–11 (1–1)	EagleBank Arena (432); Fairfax, VA
Jan 13, 2019; 2:00 pm		at Saint Joseph's	L 41–66	4–12 (1–2)	Hagan Arena (428); Philadelphia, PA
Jan 16, 2019; 4:00 pm, ESPN+		Dayton	L 49–62	4–13 (1–3)	Reilly Center (347); Olean, NY
Jan 20, 2019; 1:00 pm, ESPN+		Saint Louis	L 45–62	4–14 (1–4)	Reilly Center (250); Olean, NY
Jan 26, 2019; 2:00 pm		at Massachusetts	W 64–63	5–14 (2–4)	Mullins Center (1,248); Amherst, MA
Jan 30, 2019; 11:00 am		at Rhode Island	W 84–68	6–14 (3–4)	Ryan Center (913); Kingston, RI
Feb 3, 2019; 1:00 pm, ESPN+		George Mason	W 64–55	7–14 (4–4)	Reilly Center (625); Olean, NY
Feb 6, 2019; 7:00 pm, ESPN+		VCU	L 50–59	7–15 (4–5)	Reilly Center (659); Olean, NY
Feb 9, 2019; 1:00 pm, ESPN+		at Davidson	L 55–67	7–16 (4–6)	John M. Belk Arena (614); Davidson, NC
Feb 13, 2019; 7:00 pm		at Richmond	L 49–57	7–17 (4–7)	Robins Center (355); Richmond, VA
Feb 16, 2019; 1:00 pm, ESPN+		Fordham	L 44–53	7–18 (4–8)	Reilly Center (848); Olean, NY
Feb 21, 2019; 7:00 pm, ESPN+		Rhode Island	W 62–61	8–18 (5–8)	Reilly Center (775); Olean, NY
Feb 24, 2019; 12:00 pm		at George Washington	L 44–57	8–19 (5–9)	Charles E. Smith Center (976); Washington, D.C.
Feb 27, 2019; 5:00 pm, ESPN+		La Salle	L 45–52	8–20 (5–10)	Reilly Center (896); Olean, NY
Mar 2, 2019; 4:30 pm, ESPN+		at Duquesne	L 64–80	8–21 (5–11)	Palumbo Center (1,909); Pittsburgh, PA
Atlantic 10 Tournament
Mar 6, 2019; 7:00 pm, ESPN+	(12)	at (5) Davidson; First Round	L 49–74	8–22	John M. Belk Arena (462); Davidson, NC
*Non-conference game. ^{#}Rankings from AP Poll. (#) Tournament seedings in parentheses. All times are in Eastern Time.

== Rankings ==
2018–19 NCAA Division I women's basketball rankings

Regular season polls
Poll	Pre- Season	Week 2	Week 3	Week 4	Week 5	Week 6	Week 7	Week 8	Week 9	Week 10	Week 11	Week 12	Week 13	Week 14	Week 15	Week 16	Week 17	Week 18	Week 19	Final
AP																				N/A
Coaches																				

Legend
	Increase in ranking
	Decrease in ranking
	No change
(RV)	Received votes
(NR)	Not ranked

== See also ==
- 2018–19 St. Bonaventure Bonnies men's basketball team
