= 2018–19 Duquesne Dukes women's basketball team =

Intercollegiate basketball season

2018–19 Duquesne Dukes women's basketball
- Conference: Atlantic 10 Conference
- Record: 19–13 (11–5 A-10)
- Head coach: Dan Burt (6th season)
- Assistant coaches: Matt Schmidt; Rachel Wojdowski; Cherie Lea
- Home arena: Palumbo Center

2018–19 Atlantic 10 women's basketball standings
	Conf.				Overall
Team	W		L	PCT	W		L	PCT
Fordham †	13	–	3	.813	25	–	9	.735
VCU	13	–	3	.813	24	–	10	.706
Duquesne	11	–	5	.688	19	–	13	.594
Dayton	10	–	6	.625	17	–	14	.548
Davidson	10	–	6	.625	17	–	15	.531
Saint Louis	9	–	7	.563	15	–	16	.484
George Mason	8	–	8	.500	16	–	14	.533
Massachusetts	7	–	9	.438	16	–	16	.500
Saint Joseph's	7	–	9	.438	12	–	19	.387
George Washington	7	–	9	.438	10	–	20	.333
Richmond	6	–	10	.375	9	–	21	.300
St. Bonaventure	5	–	11	.313	8	–	22	.267
La Salle	3	–	13	.188	6	–	25	.194
Rhode Island	3	–	13	.188	8	–	21	.276
† 2019 A10 tournament winner Rankings from AP poll

The 2018–19 Duquesne Dukes women's basketball team represented Duquesne University during the 2018–19 NCAA Division I women's basketball season. The Dukes were led by sixth year head coach Dan Burt. The Dukes were members of the Atlantic 10 Conference and played their home games at the Palumbo Center. They finished the season 19–13, 11–5 in A-10 play to finish in third place. They advance to the semifinals of the A-10 women's tournament where they lost to Fordham. Despite having 19 wins, they were not invited to a postseason tournament for the first time since 2008.

== 2018–19 media ==
=== Duquesne Dukes Sports Network ===
Alex Panormios and Tad Maurey provide the call for home games on A-10 Digital Network. Select games will be televised.

== Roster ==
2018–19 Duquesne Dukes women's basketball team
Players
Coaches

Pos.	#	Name	Height	Year	Previous school	Hometown
G	1	Nina Aho	5 ft 10 in (1.78 m)	RS So	Veres Palne Gimnazium	Budapest, Hungary
G	2	Chassidy Omogrosso	5 ft 4 in (1.63 m)	Sr	Blackhawk	Beaver Falls, PA
G	3	Caroline Elliott	5 ft 11 in (1.8 m)	Fr	Vincentian Academy	Glenshaw, PA
G/F	10	Paige Cannon	6 ft 1 in (1.85 m)	RS Jr	Johnstown-Monroe	Johnstown, OH
G	11	Halle Bovel	5 ft 11 in (1.8 m)	RS So	St. Mary's	Hamilton, ON
G	12	Anie-Pier Samson	6 ft 2 in (1.88 m)	Jr	Seminaire Ste-Trinite	Saint-Bruno-de-Montarville, QC
G	13	Juca Vojinovic	5 ft 10 in (1.78 m)	Sr	Sportska Gimnazija Beograd	Belgrade, Serbia
F	14	Eniko Kuttor	6 ft 1 in (1.85 m)	RS Jr	Dániel Berzsenyi Evangélikus	Budapest, Hungary
G	21	Libby Bazelak	5 ft 9 in (1.75 m)	So	Archbishop Alter	Kettering, OH
G	22	Conor Richardson	5 ft 10 in (1.78 m)	Sr	Carlynton	Pittsburgh, PA
G	23	Machaela Simmons	5 ft 8 in (1.73 m)	Fr	Hayfield	Alexandria, VA
G	24	Kiersten Elliott	5 ft 11 in (1.8 m)	RS So	Vincentian Academy	Glenshaw, PA
F	31	Laia Sole	6 ft 2 in (1.88 m)	RS So	Ine Joaquim Blume; Maine	Igualada, Spain
G	35	Amanda Kalin	5 ft 8 in (1.73 m)	So	Pine-Richland	Gibsonia, PA
G/F	42	Kadri-Ann Lass	6 ft 3 in (1.91 m)	Sr	Audentese Spordigumnaasium	Tallinn, Estonia
F	54	Angela Staffileno	6 ft 2 in (1.88 m)	RS Jr	Brooke	Wellsburg, WV

Head coach

- Dan Burt (West Liberty State)

Assistant coach(es)

- Matt Schmidt (West Liberty State)
- Rachel Wojdowski (NYU)
- Cherie Lea (UNC Wilmington)

Legend

- (C) Team captain
- (S) Suspended
- (I) Ineligible
- (W) Walk-on
- Injured
- Current redshirt

Roster

== Schedule ==
Date time, TV	Rank^{#}	Opponent^{#}	Result	Record	Site (attendance) city, state
Non-conference regular season
Nov 6, 2018*; 1:00 pm		at TCU	L 48–61	0–1	Schollmaier Arena (3,648); Fort Worth, TX
Nov 8, 2018*; 8:00 pm, LHN		at No. 11 Texas	L 41–78	0–2	Frank Erwin Center (2,880); Austin, TX
Nov 12, 2018*; 5:00 pm, ESPN+		Mount St. Mary's	W 73–64	1–2	Palumbo Center (671); Pittsburgh, PA
Nov 18, 2018*; 2:00 pm, ESPN+		at Toledo	L 52–65	1–3	Savage Arena (3,690); Toledo, OH
Nov 25, 2018*; 2:00 pm		at Saint Francis (PA)	W 93–73	2–3	DeGol Arena (405); Loretto, PA
Nov 28, 2018*; 7:00 pm, ESPN+		at Kent State	W 77–72	3–3	MAC Center (413); Kent, OH
Dec 5, 2018*; 7:00 pm		at Penn State	W 64–58	4–3	Bryce Jordan Center (1,989); University Park, PA
Dec 12, 2018*; 7:00 pm		UCF	L 63–71	4–4	Palumbo Center (492); Pittsburgh, PA
Dec 16, 2018*; 2:30 pm		East Tennessee State	W 66–58	5–4	Palumbo Center (714); Pittsburgh, PA
Dec 21, 2018*; 7:30 pm		vs. No. 15 Syracuse; St. Pete Shootout	L 71–87	5–5	McArthur Center (264); St. Petersburg, FL
Dec 22, 2018*; 5:00 pm		vs. Liberty; St. Pete Shootout	L 51–55	5–6	McArthur Center (209); St. Petersburg, FL
Dec 29, 2018*; 2:00 pm, ATTSNPT		Pittsburgh; City Game	L 58–66	5–7	Palumbo Center (2,234); Pittsburgh, PA
Jan 3, 2019*; 7:00 pm		Temple	W 54–53	6–7	Palumbo Center (901); Pittsburgh, PA
Atlantic 10 regular season
Jan 5, 2019; 1:00 pm, ESPN+		at St. Bonaventure	W 60–54	7–7 (1–0)	Reilly Center (655); Olean, NY
Jan 9, 2019; 5:00 pm, ESPN+		Davidson	L 47–62	7–8 (1–1)	Palumbo Center (617); Pittsburgh, PA
Jan 13, 2019; 2:00 pm, CBSSN		at George Mason	W 60–57	8–8 (2–1)	EagleBank Arena (524); Fairfax, VA
Jan 16, 2019; 7:00 pm, ESPN+		Saint Joseph's	W 81–73	9–8 (3–1)	Palumbo Center (812); Pittsburgh, PA
Jan 19, 2019; 2:00 pm, ESPN+		Richmond	W 80–54	10–8 (4–1)	Palumbo Center (743); Pittsburgh, PA
Jan 23, 2019; 7:00 pm, ESPN+		at La Salle	W 66–62	11–8 (5–1)	Tom Gola Arena (372); Philadelphia, PA
Jan 27, 2019; 2:00 pm, ESPN+		George Washington	L 54–55	11–9 (5–2)	Palumbo Center (1,160); Pittsburgh, PA
Feb 3, 2019; 2:00 pm, CBSSN		at Fordham	L 46–57	11–10 (5–3)	Rose Hill Gymnasium (861); Bronx, NY
Feb 7, 2019; 7:00 pm, ESPN+		at Massachusetts	L 66–69	11–11 (5–4)	Mullins Center (509); Amherst, MA
Feb 10, 2019; 2:00 pm, ATTSNPT		Dayton	W 85–57	12–11 (6–4)	Palumbo Center (1,236); Pittsburgh, PA
Feb 13, 2019; 11:00 am, ESPN+		Saint Louis	L 63–67	12–12 (6–5)	Palumbo Center (715); Pittsburgh, PA
Feb 17, 2019; 1:00 pm, NBCSN		at Rhode Island	W 75–58	13–12 (7–5)	Ryan Center (692); Kingston, RI
Feb 20, 2019; 7:00 pm, ESPN+		at Saint Joseph's	W 67–56	14–12 (8–5)	Hagan Arena (189); Philadelphia, PA
Feb 23, 2019; 2:00 pm, ATTSNPT		VCU	W 71–68 ^{OT}	15–12 (9–5)	Palumbo Center (926); Pittsburgh, PA
Feb 27, 2019; 7:00 pm, ESPN+		at George Washington	W 64–53	16–12 (10–5)	Charles E. Smith Center (998); Washington, D.C.
Mar 2, 2019; 4:30 pm, ESPN+		St. Bonaventure	W 80–64	17–12 (11–5)	Palumbo Center (1,909); Pittsburgh, PA
Atlantic 10 Tournament
Mar 5, 2019; 7:00 pm, ESPN+	(3)	(14) Rhode Island; First Round	W 106–69	18–12	Palumbo Center (601); Pittsburgh, PA
Mar 8, 2019; 7:00 pm, ESPN+	(3)	vs. (6) Saint Louis; Quarterfinals	W 72–51	19–12	Palumbo Center (1,009); Pittsburgh, PA
Mar 9, 2019; 1:30 pm, CBSSN	(3)	vs. (2) Fordham; Semifinals	L 34–76	19–13	Palumbo Center; Pittsburgh, PA
*Non-conference game. ^{#}Rankings from AP Poll. (#) Tournament seedings in parentheses. All times are in Eastern Time.

== Rankings ==
Regular season polls
Poll	Pre- Season	Week 2	Week 3	Week 4	Week 5	Week 6	Week 7	Week 8	Week 9	Week 10	Week 11	Week 12	Week 13	Week 14	Week 15	Week 16	Week 17	Week 18	Week 19	Final
AP																				N/A
Coaches	RV																			

Legend
	Increase in ranking
	Decrease in ranking
	No change
(RV)	Received votes
(NR)	Not ranked

== See also ==
- 2018–19 Duquesne Dukes men's basketball team
