= 2018–19 Davidson Wildcats women's basketball team =

Intercollegiate basketball season

2018–19 Davidson Wildcats women's basketball

WBI, First Round
- Conference: Atlantic 10 Conference
- Record: 17–15 (10–6 A-10)
- Head coach: Gayle Coats Fulks (2nd season)
- Assistant coaches: Robyn Scherr-Wells; James Janssen; Lakevia Boykin
- Home arena: John M. Belk Arena

2018–19 Atlantic 10 women's basketball standings
	Conf.				Overall
Team	W		L	PCT	W		L	PCT
Fordham †	13	–	3	.813	25	–	9	.735
VCU	13	–	3	.813	24	–	10	.706
Duquesne	11	–	5	.688	19	–	13	.594
Dayton	10	–	6	.625	17	–	14	.548
Davidson	10	–	6	.625	17	–	15	.531
Saint Louis	9	–	7	.563	15	–	16	.484
George Mason	8	–	8	.500	16	–	14	.533
Massachusetts	7	–	9	.438	16	–	16	.500
Saint Joseph's	7	–	9	.438	12	–	19	.387
George Washington	7	–	9	.438	10	–	20	.333
Richmond	6	–	10	.375	9	–	21	.300
St. Bonaventure	5	–	11	.313	8	–	22	.267
La Salle	3	–	13	.188	6	–	25	.194
Rhode Island	3	–	13	.188	8	–	21	.276
† 2019 A10 tournament winner Rankings from AP poll

The 2018–19 Davidson Wildcats women's basketball team represented Davidson College during the 2018–19 NCAA Division I women's basketball season. The Wildcats were led by second year head coach Gayle Coats Fulks. The Wildcats are fifth year members of the Atlantic 10 Conference and played their home games at the John M. Belk Arena. They finished the season 17–15, 10–6 in A-10 play to finish in a tie for fourth place. They advanced to the quarterfinals of the A-10 women's tournament where they lost to Dayton. They received an invite to the WBI where they lost to Marshall.

== Media ==
=== Davidson Wildcats Sports Network ===
All home games were featured on ESPN+, the new home of the Atlantic 10 Digital Network basketball package. Select away games were broadcast on an audio-only basis on the school's website. Derek Smith, who has been the play-by-play voice since the 2003–04 season, provided the call for all games with Sam Goldfarb providing color commentary for home games and Leslie Urban providing color commentary for away postseason games. Select games were televised.

== Roster ==
2018–19 Davidson Wildcats women's basketball team
Players
Coaches

Pos.	#	Name	Height	Year	Previous school	Hometown
G	0	Kianna Speight (C)	5 ft 8 in (1.73 m)	Sr	Conway	Conway, AR
G	1	Katie Turner (C)	5 ft 8 in (1.73 m)	So	Bishop Manogue	Reno, NV
G	2	Chloe Welch	5 ft 9 in (1.75 m)	Fr	Mesa Ridge	Colorado Springs, CO
F	3	Andrea Robinson	6 ft 1 in (1.85 m)	Jr	McDonogh School	Randallstown, MD
G	4	Kelly Fitzgerald	5 ft 6 in (1.68 m)	So	Green Hope	Apex, NC
G	5	Justine Lyon (C)	5 ft 9 in (1.75 m)	Sr	Hillside	Durham, NC
G/F	10	Sarah Konstans	5 ft 9 in (1.75 m)	Fr	Trinity Christian Academy	Dallas, TX
G/F	11	Sarah Donovan	6 ft 0 in (1.83 m)	So	A.B. Lucas	Toronto, ON
F	13	Kyla Roland	6 ft 2 in (1.88 m)	Sr	Harrison	Farmington Hills, MI
G	14	Cassidy Gould	5 ft 9 in (1.75 m)	Fr	Methodist Ladies College	Melbourne, Australia
G	32	Sae Abdul-Aziz	5 ft 11 in (1.8 m)	Fr	Mohonasen	Schenectady, NY
F	34	Alana Davidson	6 ft 2 in (1.88 m)	Fr	New Hope-Solebury	New Hope, PA
F	42	Ally Welling	6 ft 3 in (1.91 m)	So	Concordia Lutheran	The Woodlands, TX

Head coach

- Gayle Coats Fulks (Fairleigh Dickinson)

Assistant coach(es)

- Robyn Scherr-Wells (Michigan)
- James Janssen (Deakin)
- Lakevia Boykin (Wake Forest)

Legend

- (C) Team captain
- (S) Suspended
- (I) Ineligible
- (W) Walk-on
- Injured
- Current redshirt

Roster

== Schedule ==
Date time, TV	Rank^{#}	Opponent^{#}	Result	Record	Site (attendance) city, state
Non-conference regular season
Nov 7, 2018*; 7:00 pm, ESPN+		Queens (NC)	W 80–47	1–0	John M. Belk Arena (312); Davidson, NC
Nov 11, 2018*; 3:00 pm		at Charleston Southern	W 72–34	2–0	CSU Field House (315); North Charleston, SC
Nov 14, 2018*; 11:00 am		at Gardner–Webb	L 49–54	2–1	Paul Porter Arena (986); Boiling Springs, NC
Nov 17, 2018*; 7:00 pm, ESPN+		Appalachian State	L 78–81	2–2	John M. Belk Arena (587); Davidson, NC
Nov 21, 2018*; 4:30 pm		at UNC Asheville	L 56–69	2–3	Kimmel Arena (935); Asheville, NC
Nov 24, 2018*; 5:00 pm, ESPN+		William & Mary	W 76–65	3–3	John M. Belk Arena (412); Davidson, NC
Nov 26, 2018*; 7:00 pm, ESPN+		High Point	W 71–62	4–3	John M. Belk Arena (389); Davidson, NC
Dec 2, 2018*; 2:00 pm, ESPN+		at Princeton	L 57–65	4–4	Jadwin Gymnasium (735); Princeton, NJ
Dec 5, 2018*; 7:00 pm		at Elon	L 72–73 ^{OT}	4–5	Schar Center (404); Elon, NC
Dec 16, 2018*; 2:00 pm, ACCN Extra		at Clemson	W 90–80	5–5	Littlejohn Coliseum (590); Clemson, SC
Dec 18, 2018*; 11:00 am, ESPN+		Presbyterian	W 83–56	6–5	John M. Belk Arena (3,114); Davidson, NC
Dec 21, 2018*; 6:00 pm		at Charlotte	L 66–78	6–6	Dale F. Halton Arena (725); Charlotte, NC
Dec 30, 2018*; 2:00 pm, ACCN Extra		at No. 9 NC State	L 45–75	6–7	Reynolds Coliseum (3,050); Raleigh, NC
Atlantic 10 regular season
Jan 6, 2019; 2:00 pm, ESPN+		George Mason	W 67–59	7–7 (1–0)	John M. Belk Arena (545); Davidson, NC
Jan 9, 2019; 5:00 pm, ESPN+		at Duquesne	W 62–47	8–7 (2–0)	Palumbo Center (617); Pittsburgh, PA
Jan 12, 2019; 2:00 pm, ESPN+		at Rhode Island	W 77–67	9–7 (3–0)	Ryan Center (440); Kingston, RI
Jan 16, 2019; 7:00 pm, ESPN+		Richmond	W 78–55	10–7 (4–0)	John M. Belk Arena (731); Davidson, NC
Jan 20, 2019; 1:00 pm, ESPN+		Massachusetts	L 58–70	10–8 (4–1)	John M. Belk Arena (511); Davidson, NC
Jan 27, 2019; 2:00 pm, ESPN+		at Fordham	W 60–56	11–8 (5–1)	Rose Hill Gymnasium (919); Bronx, NY
Jan 31, 2019; 12:00 pm, ESPN+		at George Washington	W 62–42	12–8 (6–1)	Charles E. Smith Center (1,667); Washington, D.C.
Feb 3, 2019; 2:00 pm, ESPN+		La Salle	W 80–61	13–8 (7–1)	John M. Belk Arena (623); Davidson, NC
Feb 6, 2019; 2:00 pm, ESPN+		at Saint Joseph's	L 54–66	13–9 (7–2)	Hagan Arena (231); Philadelphia, PA
Feb 9, 2019; 1:00 pm, ESPN+		St. Bonaventure	W 67–55	14–9 (8–2)	John M. Belk Arena (614); Davidson, NC
Feb 13, 2019; 7:00 pm, ESPN+		Fordham	L 42–58	14–10 (8–3)	John M. Belk Arena (418); Davidson, NC
Feb 16, 2019; 2:00 pm, ESPN+		at Massachusetts	W 64–49	15–10 (9–3)	Mullins Center (775); Amherst, MA
Feb 20, 2019; 7:00 pm, ESPN+		at Dayton	L 69–83	15–11 (9–4)	UD Arena (2,123); Dayton, OH
Feb 23, 2019; 2:00 pm, ESPN+		at Saint Louis	W 60–57	16–11 (10–4)	John M. Belk Arena (921); Davidson, NC
Feb 27, 2019; 7:00 pm, ESPN+		Rhode Island	L 58–64	16–12 (10–5)	John M. Belk Arena (421); Davidson, NC
Mar 2, 2019; 1:00 pm, ESPN+		at VCU	L 54–61	16–13 (10–6)	Siegel Center (1,261); Richmond, VA
Atlantic 10 Women's Tournament
Mar 5, 2019; 7:00 pm, ESPN+	(5)	(12) St. Bonaventure; First Round	W 74–49	17–13	John M. Belk Arena (462); Davidson, NC
Mar 8, 2019; 2:00 pm, ESPN+	(5)	vs. (4) Dayton; Quarterfinals	L 67–84	17–14	Palumbo Center; Pittsburgh, PA
WBI
Mar 20, 2019*; 7:00 pm, ESPN+		Marshall; First Round	L 64–67	17–15	John M. Belk Arena (324); Davidson, NC
*Non-conference game. ^{#}Rankings from AP Poll. (#) Tournament seedings in parentheses. All times are in Eastern Time.

== See also ==
- 2018–19 Davidson Wildcats men's basketball team
