= 2018–19 Richmond Spiders women's basketball team =

Intercollegiate basketball season

2018–19 Richmond Spiders women's basketball
- Conference: Atlantic 10 Conference
- Record: 9–21 (6–10 A-10)
- Head coach: Michael Shafer (14th season)
- Assistant coaches: John Miller; Kara Powell; Martina Wood
- Home arena: Robins Center

2018–19 Atlantic 10 women's basketball standings
	Conf.				Overall
Team	W		L	PCT	W		L	PCT
Fordham †	13	–	3	.813	25	–	9	.735
VCU	13	–	3	.813	24	–	10	.706
Duquesne	11	–	5	.688	19	–	13	.594
Dayton	10	–	6	.625	17	–	14	.548
Davidson	10	–	6	.625	17	–	15	.531
Saint Louis	9	–	7	.563	15	–	16	.484
George Mason	8	–	8	.500	16	–	14	.533
Massachusetts	7	–	9	.438	16	–	16	.500
Saint Joseph's	7	–	9	.438	12	–	19	.387
George Washington	7	–	9	.438	10	–	20	.333
Richmond	6	–	10	.375	9	–	21	.300
St. Bonaventure	5	–	11	.313	8	–	22	.267
La Salle	3	–	13	.188	6	–	25	.194
Rhode Island	3	–	13	.188	8	–	21	.276
† 2019 A10 tournament winner Rankings from AP poll

The 2018–19 Richmond Spiders women's basketball team represented the University of Richmond during the 2018–19 NCAA Division I women's basketball season. The Spiders, led by 14th-year head coach Michael Shafer, played their home games at the Robins Center in Richmond, Virginia and were members of the Atlantic 10 Conference (A-10). They finished the season 9–21, 6–10 in A-10 play, to finish in eleventh place. They lost in the first round of the A-10 women's tournament to Saint Louis.

It was announced that on March 10 that Shafer would not return, ending his 14-year coaching tenure at Richmond. Shafer left as the all-time winningest coach of the program with 223 wins, but never led the Spiders to the NCAA tournament during his time.

== 2018–19 media ==
All Spiders games were broadcast on WTVR 6.3 with Robert Fish on the call. The games also streamed on Spider TV.

== Roster ==
2018–19 Richmond Spiders women's basketball team
Players
Coaches

Pos.	#	Name	Height	Year	Previous school	Hometown
F	1	Jaide Hinds-Clarke	6 ft 1 in (1.85 m)	Jr	Westwood	Westwood, NJ
G	2	Aniyah Carpenter	5 ft 8 in (1.73 m)	Fr	Roland Park Country	Baltimore, MD
G	3	DaiJia Ruffin	5 ft 9 in (1.75 m)	Sr	Sacred Heart Academy; Alabama	Lexington, KY
F	5	Ragan Wiseman	6 ft 1 in (1.85 m)	Jr	Floyd County	Floyd, VA
F	10	Madelyn Neff	6 ft 1 in (1.85 m)	Fr	Hayward	Hayward, WI
F	11	Kaila Clark (redshirt)	5 ft 11 in (1.8 m)	Jr	Archbishop Spalding; Navy	Hughesville, MD
G	12	Claire Holt	5 ft 6 in (1.68 m)	Fr	Spain Park	Hoover, AL
G	13	Alex Parson	5 ft 6 in (1.68 m)	So	Monacan	North Chesterfield, VA
F	15	Emma Squires	6 ft 2 in (1.88 m)	Fr	Tabor Academy	Marion, MA
F	21	Imani Mustaf	6 ft 5 in (1.96 m)	Fr	Maret School	Washington, D.C.
G	22	Molly Mraz	5 ft 8 in (1.73 m)	Fr	Villa Maria Academy	Erie, PA
F	23	Autumn Truesdale	6 ft 0 in (1.83 m)	So	The Berkshire School	New York, NY
G	25	Jayana Ervin	5 ft 8 in (1.73 m)	Jr	Bellarmine Prep; Harcum College	Tacoma, WA
F	30	Kailyn Fee	5 ft 6 in (1.68 m)	So	Oakton	Vienna, VA
F	33	Amy Duggan	6 ft 0 in (1.83 m)	Jr	Noble and Greenough	Norwood, MA

Head coach

- Michael Shafer (William & Mary)

Assistant coach(es)

- John Miller (Mount St. Mary's)
- Kara Powell (Richmond)
- Martina Wood (North Carolina)

Legend

- (C) Team captain
- (S) Suspended
- (I) Ineligible
- (W) Walk-on
- Injured
- Current redshirt

Roster
Last update: June 6, 2025

== Schedule ==
Date time, TV	Rank^{#}	Opponent^{#}	Result	Record	Site (attendance) city, state
Non-conference regular season
November 6, 2018*; 7:00 p.m., ESPN+		Georgetown	L 53–73	0–1	Robins Center (1,006); Richmond, VA
November 9, 2018*; 2:00 p.m., ESPN+		Fairfield	L 40–58	0–2	Robins Center (527); Richmond, VA
November 11, 2018*; 1:00 p.m., ACCN Extra		at Wake Forest	L 48–62	0–3	LJVM Coliseum (407); Winston-Salem, NC
November 14, 2018*; 7:00 p.m., ESPN+		Maryland Eastern Shore	W 57–55	1–3	Robins Center (454); Richmond, VA
November 18, 2018*; 2:00 p.m.		at Florida Atlantic	L 55–69	1–4	FAU Arena (555); Boca Raton, FL
November 24, 2018*; 2:30 p.m.		at UCF; UCF Thanksgiving Tournament	L 48–70	1–5	CFE Arena (761); Orlando, FL
November 25, 2018*; 12:00 p.m.		vs. Virginia Tech; UCF Thanksgiving Tournament	L 57–85	1–6	CFE Arena; Orlando, FL
December 5, 2018*; 7:00 p.m.		at William & Mary	L 55–65	1–7	Kaplan Arena (634); Williamsburg, VA
December 8, 2018*; 7:00 p.m., ESPN+		Howard	W 67–60	2–7	Robins Center (673); Richmond, VA
December 19, 2018*; 5:30 p.m.		at Quinnipiac	L 48–65	2–8	People's United Center (453); Hamden, CT
December 22, 2018*; 2:00 p.m., ESPN+		Ohio	L 58–109	2–9	Robins Center (505); Richmond, VA
December 29, 2018*; 2:00 p.m., ESPN+		Drexel	L 35–58	2–10	Robins Center (635); Richmond, VA
January 2, 2019*; 7:00 p.m., ESPN+		UNC Greensboro	W 59–48	3–10	Robins Center (454); Richmond, VA
Atlantic 10 regular season
January 5, 2019; 2:00 p.m., ESPN+		Rhode Island	L 60–66	3–11 (0–1)	Robins Center (659); Richmond, VA
January 9, 2019; 11:00 a.m., ESPN+		at Fordham	L 49–60	3–12 (0–2)	Rose Hill Gymnasium (2,538); The Bronx, NY
January 12, 2019; 1:00 p.m., ESPN+		VCU; Capital City Classic	L 43–68	3–13 (0–3)	Robins Center (1,393); Richmond, VA
January 16, 2019; 7:00 p.m., ESPN+		at Davidson	L 55–78	3–14 (0–4)	John M. Belk Arena (731); Davidson, NC
January 19, 2019; 2:00 p.m., ESPN+		at Duquesne	L 54–80	3–15 (0–5)	Palumbo Center (743); Pittsburgh, PA
January 23, 2019; 7:00 p.m., ESPN+		Saint Joseph's	W 46–45	4–15 (1–5)	Robins Center (551); Richmond, VA
January 26, 2019; 2:00 p.m., ESPN+		at La Salle	W 74–60	5–15 (2–5)	Tom Gola Arena (324); Philadelphia, PA
February 3, 2019; 12:00 p.m., ESPN+		Massachusetts	W 62–58	6–15 (3–5)	Robins Center (576); Richmond, VA
February 6, 2019; 7:00 p.m.		at Dayton	L 50–71	6–16 (3–6)	UD Arena (1,818); Dayton, OH
February 9, 2019; 6:00 p.m.		at VCU; Capital City Classic	L 37–58	6–17 (3–7)	Siegel Center (2,033); Richmond, VA
February 13, 2019; 7:00 p.m.		St. Bonaventure	W 55–47	7–17 (4–7)	Robins Center (355); Richmond, VA
February 17, 2019; 3:00 p.m., NBCSN		at Saint Louis	L 48–78	7–18 (4–8)	Chaifetz Arena (5,786); St. Louis, MO
February 21, 2019; 7:00 p.m.		George Mason	L 52–67	7–19 (4–9)	Robins Center (548); Richmond, VA
February 24, 2019; 2:00 p.m.		La Salle	W 56–51	8–19 (5–9)	Robins Center (667); Richmond, VA
February 27, 2019; 7:00 p.m., ESPN+		at Massachusetts	L 38–64	8–20 (5–10)	Mullins Center (541); Amherst, MA
March 2, 2019; 11:00 a.m., ESPN+		George Washington	W 56–48	9–20 (6–10)	Robins Center (629); Richmond, VA
Atlantic 10 tournament
March 5, 2019; 8:00 p.m., ESPN+	(11)	at (6) Saint Louis; First round	L 49–58	9–21	Chaifetz Arena (608); St. Louis, MO
*Non-conference game. ^{#}Rankings from AP poll. (#) Tournament seedings in parentheses. All times are in Eastern.

== Rankings ==
Regular-season polls
Poll	Pre- season	Week 2	Week 3	Week 4	Week 5	Week 6	Week 7	Week 8	Week 9	Week 10	Week 11	Week 12	Week 13	Week 14	Week 15	Week 16	Week 17	Week 18	Week 19	Final
AP																				N/A
Coaches																				

Legend
	Increase in ranking
	Decrease in ranking
	No change
(RV)	Received votes
(NR)	Not ranked

== See also ==
- 2018–19 Richmond Spiders men's basketball team
