= 2018–19 George Mason Patriots women's basketball team =

American college basketball season

2018–19 George Mason Patriots women's basketball
- Conference: Atlantic 10 Conference
- Record: 16–14 (8–8 A-10)
- Head coach: Nyla Milleson (6th season)
- Assistant coaches: Tajama Abraham Ngongba; Bob Dunn; Kaci Bailey
- Home arena: EagleBank Arena

2018–19 Atlantic 10 women's basketball standings
| | Conf. | | | | Overall |
| Team | W | | L | PCT | W | | L | PCT |
|---|---|---|---|---|---|---|---|---|
| Fordham † | 13 | – | 3 | .813 | 25 | – | 9 | .735 |
| VCU | 13 | – | 3 | .813 | 24 | – | 10 | .706 |
| Duquesne | 11 | – | 5 | .688 | 19 | – | 13 | .594 |
| Dayton | 10 | – | 6 | .625 | 17 | – | 14 | .548 |
| Davidson | 10 | – | 6 | .625 | 17 | – | 15 | .531 |
| Saint Louis | 9 | – | 7 | .563 | 15 | – | 16 | .484 |
| George Mason | 8 | – | 8 | .500 | 16 | – | 14 | .533 |
| Massachusetts | 7 | – | 9 | .438 | 16 | – | 16 | .500 |
| Saint Joseph's | 7 | – | 9 | .438 | 12 | – | 19 | .387 |
| George Washington | 7 | – | 9 | .438 | 10 | – | 20 | .333 |
| Richmond | 6 | – | 10 | .375 | 9 | – | 21 | .300 |
| St. Bonaventure | 5 | – | 11 | .313 | 8 | – | 22 | .267 |
| La Salle | 3 | – | 13 | .188 | 6 | – | 25 | .194 |
| Rhode Island | 3 | – | 13 | .188 | 8 | – | 21 | .276 |
† 2019 A10 tournament winner Rankings from AP poll

The 2018–19 George Mason Patriots women's basketball team represented George Mason University during the 2018–19 NCAA Division I women's basketball season. The team was led by sixth-year head coach Nyla Milleson and played its home games at EagleBank Arena in Fairfax, Virginia. The Patriots competed as members of the Atlantic 10 Conference (A-10).

George Mason finished the season with an overall record of 16–14 and an 8–8 mark in A-10 play, placing seventh in the conference standings. The team advanced to the quarterfinals of the A-10 Tournament, where they were defeated by the UMass Minutewomen.

== Media ==
Patriots games were broadcast on WGMU Radio and streamed online via Patriot Vision. Most home games were also available on the A-10 Digital Network, with select matchups televised regionally or nationally.

== Roster ==
2018–19 George Mason Patriots women's basketball team
Players
Coaches

| Pos. | # | Name | Height | Year | Previous school | Hometown |
|---|---|---|---|---|---|---|
| G | 4 | Livija Kakataite | 5 ft 7 in (1.7 m) | Fr | Long Island Lutheran | Švėkšna, Lithuania |
| G | 5 | Alexsis Grate | 5 ft 6 in (1.68 m) | Jr | Bethel | Hampton, VA |
| G | 10 | Jewel Triggs | 5 ft 11 in (1.8 m) | Sr | Thibodaux | Thibodaux, LA |
| G/F | 11 | Jacy Bolton | 6 ft 0 in (1.83 m) | Jr | Drexel | Drexel, MO |
| G | 12 | Marika Korpinen | 5 ft 9 in (1.75 m) | So | Long Island Lutheran | Turku, Finland |
| G | 14 | Nicole Cardaño-Hillary | 5 ft 7 in (1.7 m) | So | Vista Ridge | Madrid, Spain |
| F | 15 | Devyn Wilson | 6 ft 1 in (1.85 m) | Fr | Norcross | Norcross, GA |
| F | 21 | Casey Davis | 6 ft 2 in (1.88 m) | RS Sr | Elizabeth Seton | Gambrills, MD |
| G | 23 | Ariana Freeman | 5 ft 9 in (1.75 m) | RS Sr | Paul VI Catholic; Colorado | Manassas, VA |
| F | 31 | Danielle Deoul | 6 ft 2 in (1.88 m) | RS Fr | Immaculate Conception | Washingtonville, NY |
| G | 32 | Tayler Dodson | 5 ft 11 in (1.8 m) | Sr | Spotswood | Harrisonburg, VA |
| F | 33 | Camarie Gatling | 6 ft 0 in (1.83 m) | So | Highland Springs | Richmond, VA |
| F | 35 | Allie McCool | 6 ft 2 in (1.88 m) | Jr | East Central | St. Leon, IN |
| G | 44 | Sarah Kaminski | 5 ft 9 in (1.75 m) | Jr | Minnehaha | Plymouth, MN |

Head coach

- Nyla Milleson (Kansas State)

Assistant coach(es)

- Tajama Abraham Ngongba (George Washington)
- Bob Dunn (Dayton)
- Kaci Bailey (Southern Illinois)

Legend

- (C) Team captain
- (S) Suspended
- (I) Ineligible
- (W) Walk-on
- Injured
- Current redshirt

Roster
Last update: May 3, 2025

== Schedule ==
| Date time, TV | Rank^{#} | Opponent^{#} | Result | Record | Site (attendance) city, state |
Non-conference regular season
| November 6, 2018*; 4:00 p.m., ESPN+ | | Loyola (MD) | W 70–38 | 1–0 | EagleBank Arena (687); Fairfax, VA |
| November 9, 2018*; 2:00 p.m. | | at Air Force | W 78–71 | 2–0 | Clune Arena (991); Colorado Springs, CO |
| November 14, 2018*; 7:00 p.m. | | at American | L 71–86 | 2–1 | Bender Arena (581); Washington, D.C. |
| November 18, 2018*; 2:00 p.m., ESPN+ | | Colgate | W 64–61 | 3–1 | EagleBank Arena (688); Fairfax, VA |
| November 21, 2018*; 8:00 p.m., ESPN+ | | at Kansas | L 56–77 | 3–2 | Allen Fieldhouse (2,095); Lawrence, KS |
| November 23, 2018*; 3:00 p.m. | | at UMKC | W 91–84 | 4–2 | Swinney Recreation Center (585); Kansas City, MO |
| November 28, 2018*; 7:00 p.m. | | at Howard | L 59–73 | 4–3 | Burr Gymnasium; Washington, D.C. |
| December 2, 2018*; 3:00 p.m., P12N | | at Washington | L 52–81 | 4–4 | Alaska Airlines Arena (1,260); Seattle, WA |
| December 6, 2018*; 7:00 p.m., ESPN+ | | Delaware | W 72–46 | 5–4 | EagleBank Arena (616); Fairfax, VA |
| December 9, 2018*; 2:00 p.m. | | at Eastern Kentucky | W 91–75 | 6–4 | McBrayer Arena (420); Richmond, KY |
| December 21, 2018*; 4:00 p.m., ESPN+ | | Houston | L 56–66 | 6–5 | EagleBank Arena (602); Fairfax, VA |
| December 29, 2018*; 2:00 p.m., ESPN+ | | Maryland Eastern Shore | W 70–49 | 7–5 | EagleBank Arena (840); Fairfax, VA |
| December 31, 2018*; 2:00 p.m., ESPN+ | | College of Charleston | W 66–52 | 8–5 | EagleBank Arena (841); Fairfax, VA |
Atlantic 10 regular season
| January 6, 2019; 2:00 p.m., ESPN+ | | at Davidson | L 59–67 | 8–6 (0–1) | John M. Belk Arena (545); Davidson, NC |
| January 10, 2019; 7:00 p.m., ESPN+ | | St. Bonaventure | L 57–68 | 8–7 (0–2) | EagleBank Arena (432); Fairfax, VA |
| January 13, 2019; 2:00 p.m., CBSSN | | Duquesne | L 57–60 | 8–8 (0–3) | EagleBank Arena (524); Fairfax, VA |
| January 16, 2019; 12:00 p.m., NBCSN | | at Massachusetts | W 70–52 | 9–8 (1–3) | Mullins Center (3,310); Amherst, MA |
| January 19, 2019; 2:00 p.m., ESPN+ | | at George Washington; Revolutionary Rivalry | W 64–60 | 10–8 (2–3) | Charles E. Smith Center (1,003); Washington, D.C. |
| January 27, 2019; 2:00 p.m., ESPN+ | | Rhode Island | W 75–69 | 11–8 (3–3) | EagleBank Arena (1,158); Fairfax, VA |
| January 31, 2019; 8:00 p.m., ESPN+ | | at Saint Louis | L 53–60 | 11–9 (3–4) | Chaifetz Arena (332); St. Louis, MO |
| February 3, 2019; 1:00 p.m., ESPN+ | | at St. Bonaventure | L 55–64 | 11–10 (3–5) | Reilly Center (625); Olean, NY |
| February 6, 2019; 7:00 p.m., ESPN+ | | George Washington; Revolutionary Rivalry | W 61–46 | 12–10 (4–5) | EagleBank Arena (1,468); Fairfax, VA |
| February 10, 2019; 2:00 p.m., ESPN+ | | at Fordham | L 53–64 | 12–11 (4–6) | Rose Hill Gymnasium (919); The Bronx, NY |
| February 14, 2019; 7:00 p.m., ESPN+ | | La Salle | W 59–42 | 13–11 (5–6) | EagleBank Arena (641); Fairfax, VA |
| February 17, 2019; 2:00 p.m., ESPN+ | | VCU | L 38–62 | 13–12 (5–7) | EagleBank Arena (2,725); Fairfax, VA |
| February 21, 2019; 2:00 p.m., ESPN+ | | at Richmond | W 67–52 | 14–12 (6–7) | Robins Center (548); Richmond, VA |
| February 24, 2019; 2:00 p.m., ESPN+ | | Dayton | W 54–51 | 15–12 (7–7) | EagleBank Arena (1,842); Fairfax, VA |
| February 27, 2019; 4:00 p.m., ESPN+ | | Saint Joseph's | W 68–59 | 16–12 (8–7) | EagleBank Arena (700); Fairfax, VA |
| March 2, 2019; 7:00 p.m., ESPN+ | | at La Salle | L 71–77 | 16–13 (8–8) | Tom Gola Arena (542); Philadelphia, PA |
Atlantic 10 women's tournament
| March 5, 2019; 12:00 p.m., ESPN+ | (7) | (10) UMass; Quarterfinals | L 80–86 ^{2OT} | 16–14 | EagleBank Arena (259); Fairfax, VA |
*Non-conference game. ^{#}Rankings from AP poll. (#) Tournament seedings in parentheses. All times are in Eastern.

== Rankings ==
Regular-season polls
| Poll | Pre- season | Week 2 | Week 3 | Week 4 | Week 5 | Week 6 | Week 7 | Week 8 | Week 9 | Week 10 | Week 11 | Week 12 | Week 13 | Week 14 | Week 15 | Week 16 | Week 17 | Week 18 | Week 19 | Final |
|---|---|---|---|---|---|---|---|---|---|---|---|---|---|---|---|---|---|---|---|---|
| AP | | | | | | | | | | | | | | | | | | | | N/A |
| Coaches | | | | | | | | | | | | | | | | | | | | |

Legend
| | Increase in ranking |
| | Decrease in ranking |
| | No change |
| (RV) | Received votes |
| (NR) | Not ranked |

== See also ==
- 2018–19 George Mason Patriots men's basketball team
