= 2018–19 La Salle Explorers women's basketball team =

Intercollegiate basketball season

2018–19 La Salle Explorers women's basketball
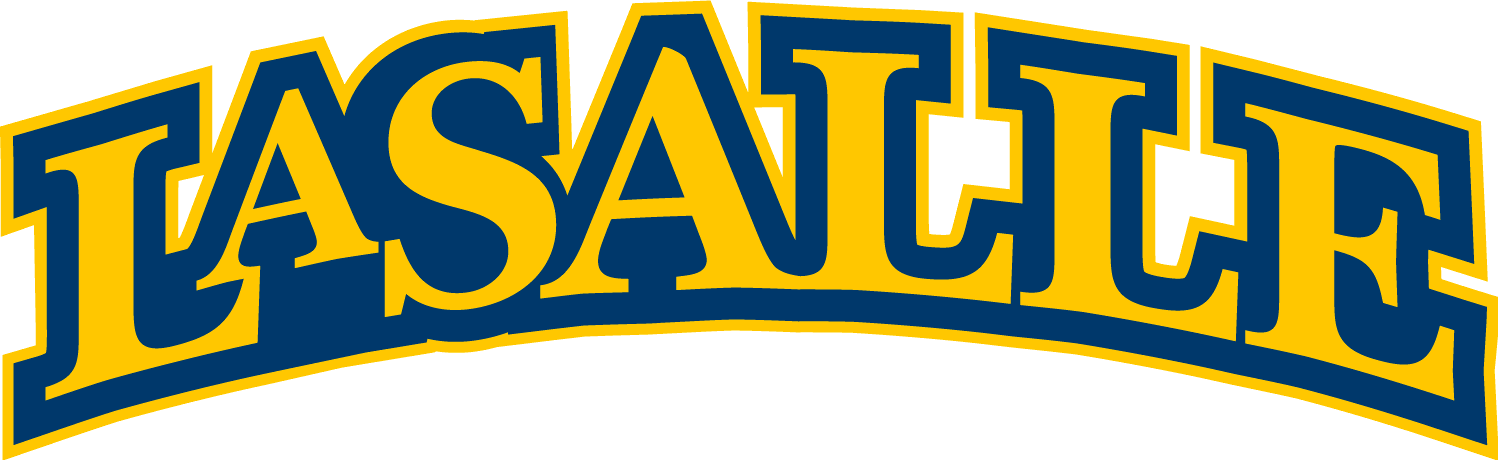
- Conference: Atlantic 10 Conference
- Record: 6–25 (3–13 A-10)
- Head coach: Mountain MacGillivray (1st season)
- Assistant coaches: Chris Day; Dalila Eshe; Gillian Abshire
- Home arena: Tom Gola Arena

2018–19 Atlantic 10 women's basketball standings
	Conf.				Overall
Team	W		L	PCT	W		L	PCT
Fordham †	13	–	3	.813	25	–	9	.735
VCU	13	–	3	.813	24	–	10	.706
Duquesne	11	–	5	.688	19	–	13	.594
Dayton	10	–	6	.625	17	–	14	.548
Davidson	10	–	6	.625	17	–	15	.531
Saint Louis	9	–	7	.563	15	–	16	.484
George Mason	8	–	8	.500	16	–	14	.533
Massachusetts	7	–	9	.438	16	–	16	.500
Saint Joseph's	7	–	9	.438	12	–	19	.387
George Washington	7	–	9	.438	10	–	20	.333
Richmond	6	–	10	.375	9	–	21	.300
St. Bonaventure	5	–	11	.313	8	–	22	.267
La Salle	3	–	13	.188	6	–	25	.194
Rhode Island	3	–	13	.188	8	–	21	.276
† 2019 A10 tournament winner Rankings from AP poll

The 2018–19 La Salle Explorers women's basketball team represented La Salle University during the 2018–19 NCAA Division I women's basketball season. The Explorers, led by first year head coach Mountain MacGillivray, played their home games at Tom Gola Arena and were members of the Atlantic 10 Conference. They finished the season 6–25, 3–13 in A-10 to finish in a tie for last place. They lost in the first round of the A-10 women's tournament to Dayton.

== Media ==
=== La Salle Explorers Sports Network ===
Select Explorers games will be broadcast online by the La Salle Portal. The A-10 Digital Network will carry all non-televised Explorers home games and most conference road games.

== Roster ==
2018–19 La Salle Explorers women's basketball team
Players
Coaches

Pos.	#	Name	Height	Year	Previous school	Hometown
G	2	Shayla Sweeney	5 ft 11 in (1.8 m)	Fr	Pennsauken	Pennsauken, NJ
G	3	Rayshel Brown	5 ft 8 in (1.73 m)	So	Curtis	Staten Island, NY
G	4	Kate Hill (redshirt)	5 ft 7 in (1.7 m)	Jr	Peddie; Rutgers	Toronto, ON
F/C	5	Amber Wilks	6 ft 3 in (1.91 m)	RS Jr	Walnut Hills	Cincinnati, OH
G	11	Deja King	5 ft 7 in (1.7 m)	So	Life Center Academy	Trenton, NJ
G/F	14	Michelle Nicholls	5 ft 9 in (1.75 m)	So	Life Center Academy	Auckland, New Zealand
G/F	15	Kayla Spruill	6 ft 0 in (1.83 m)	Fr	Western School of Technology	Baltimore, MD
F	22	Jeryn Reese	6 ft 0 in (1.83 m)	Sr	Mansfield; Owens CC	Mansfield, OH
F/C	25	Shalina Miller	6 ft 2 in (1.88 m)	Jr	Archbishop Prendergast	Philadelphia, PA
G	30	Janay Sanders	5 ft 10 in (1.78 m)	Fr	Mallard Creek	Charlotte, NC
F	32	Jasmine White	6 ft 1 in (1.85 m)	So	St. Anthony's	Huntington, NY
G	33	Erin Morgan	5 ft 8 in (1.73 m)	Fr	Archbishop Wood	Willow Grove, PA
C	35	Sofilia Ngwafang	6 ft 4 in (1.93 m)	Jr	Paint Branch	Silver Spring, MD

Head coach

- Mountain MacGillivray (Temple)

Assistant coach(es)

- Chris Day (West Chester)
- Dalila Eshe (Florida)
- Gillian Abshire (Quinnipiac)

Legend

- (C) Team captain
- (S) Suspended
- (I) Ineligible
- (W) Walk-on
- Injured
- Current redshirt

Roster

== Schedule ==
Date time, TV	Rank^{#}	Opponent^{#}	Result	Record	Site (attendance) city, state
Non-conference Regular season
Nov 6, 2018*; 5:15 pm, ESPN+		Howard	L 54–57	0–1	Tom Gola Arena (478); Philadelphia, PA
Nov 11, 2018*; 12:00 pm		at Robert Morris	L 39–67	0–2	North Athletic Complex (662); Moon Township, PA
Nov 14, 2018*; 7:00 pm, ESPN+		at Harvard	L 43–88	0–3	Lavietes Pavilion (667); Cambridge, MA
Nov 17, 2018*; 7:00 pm		at Towson	L 68–92	0–4	SECU Arena; Towson, MD
Nov 20, 2018*; 7:00 pm		at Villanova	L 68–81	0–5	Finneran Pavilion (535); Villanova, PA
Nov 28, 2018*; 7:00 pm, ESPN+		Drexel	L 43–58	0–6	Tom Gola Arena; Philadelphia, PA
Dec 1, 2018*; 3:00 pm, P12N		at No. 9 Oregon State	L 46–100	0–7	Gill Coliseum (4,016); Corvallis, OR
Dec 5, 2018*; 7:00 pm, NBCSPHI		at Penn	L 34–65	0–8	Palestra (449); Philadelphia, PA
Dec 9, 2018*; 1:00 pm, ESPN+		Norfolk State	W 52–42	1–8	Tom Gola Arena (453); Philadelphia, PA
Dec 15, 2018*; 2:00 pm, ESPN+		St. John's	L 57–83	1–9	Tom Gola Arena (427); Philadelphia, PA
Dec 19, 2018*; 7:00 pm		vs. Northern Kentucky; Friar Holiday Classic	W 74–56	2–9	Alumni Hall (112); Providence, RI
Dec 20, 2018*; 4:30 pm		vs. Pepperdine; Friar Holiday Classic	W 62–55	3–9	Alumni Hall (112); Providence, RI
Dec 21, 2018*; 2:30 pm		at Providence; Friar Holiday Classic	L 47–77	3–10	Alumni Hall (176); Providence, RI
Dec 30, 2018*; 2:00 pm		at Temple	L 47–75	3–11	McGonigle Hall (801); Philadelphia, PA
Atlantic 10 Regular season
Jan 5, 2019; 2:00 pm, ESPN+		at Dayton	L 48–84	3–12 (0-1)	UD Arena (2,339); Dayton, OH
Jan 8, 2019; 6:00 pm, ESPN+		at VCU	L 38–68	3–13 (0–2)	Siegel Center (412); Richmond, VA
Jan 13, 2019; 2:00 pm, ESPN+		Massachusetts	L 60–74	3–14 (0–3)	Tom Gola Arena (362); Philadelphia, PA
Jan 16, 2019; 5:00 pm, ESPN+		George Washington	L 59–67	3–15 (0–4)	Tom Gola Arena (387); Philadelphia, PA
Jan 20, 2019; 4:00 pm, CBSSN		at Saint Joseph's	L 57–60	3–16 (0–5)	Hagan Arena (903); Philadelphia, PA
Jan 23, 2019; 7:00 pm, ESPN+		Duquesne	L 62–66	3–17 (0–6)	Tom Gola Arena (372); Philadelphia, PA
Jan 26, 2019; 2:00 pm, ESPN+		Richmond	L 60–74	3–18 (0–7)	Tom Gola Arena (324); Philadelphia, PA
Jan 31, 2019; 7:00 pm, ESPN+		Fordham	L 54–65	3–19 (0–8)	Tom Gola Arena (374); Philadelphia, PA
Feb 3, 2019; 2:00 pm, ESPN+		at Davidson	L 61–80	3–20 (0–9)	John M. Belk Arena (623); Davidson, NC
Feb 6, 2019; 11:00 am, ESPN+		at Rhode Island	W 77–71	4–20 (1–9)	Ryan Center (726); Kingston, RI
Feb 10, 2019; 3:00 pm, ESPN+		at Saint Louis	L 58–69	4–21 (1–10)	Chaifetz Arena (265); St. Louis, MO
Feb 14, 2019; 7:00 pm, ESPN+		at George Mason	L 42–59	4–22 (1–11)	EagleBank Arena (641); Fairfax, VA
Feb 17, 2019; 2:00 pm, ESPN+		Saint Joseph's	L 63–64	4–23 (1–12)	Tom Gola Arena (639); Philadelphia, PA
Feb 24, 2019; 2:00 pm, ESPN+		at Richmond	L 51–56	4–24 (1–13)	Robins Center (667); Richmond, VA
Feb 27, 2019; 5:00 pm, ESPN+		at St. Bonaventure	W 52–45	5–24 (2–13)	Reilly Center (896); Olean, NY
Mar 2, 2019; 7:00 pm, ESPN+		George Mason	W 77–71	6–24 (3–13)	Tom Gola Arena (542); Philadelphia, PA
Atlantic 10 Women's Tournament
Mar 5, 2019; 7:00 pm, ESPN+	(13)	at (4) Dayton; First Round	L 38–65	6–25	UD Arena (1,001); Dayton, OH
*Non-conference game. ^{#}Rankings from AP Poll. (#) Tournament seedings in parentheses. All times are in Eastern Time.

== Rankings ==
2018–19 NCAA Division I women's basketball rankings

Regular season polls
Poll	Pre- Season	Week 2	Week 3	Week 4	Week 5	Week 6	Week 7	Week 8	Week 9	Week 10	Week 11	Week 12	Week 13	Week 14	Week 15	Week 16	Week 17	Week 18	Week 19	Final
AP																				N/A
Coaches																				

Legend
	Increase in ranking
	Decrease in ranking
	No change
(RV)	Received votes
(NR)	Not ranked

== See also ==
- 2018–19 La Salle Explorers men's basketball team
