= Harry Perretta =

American basketball coach (born 1955)

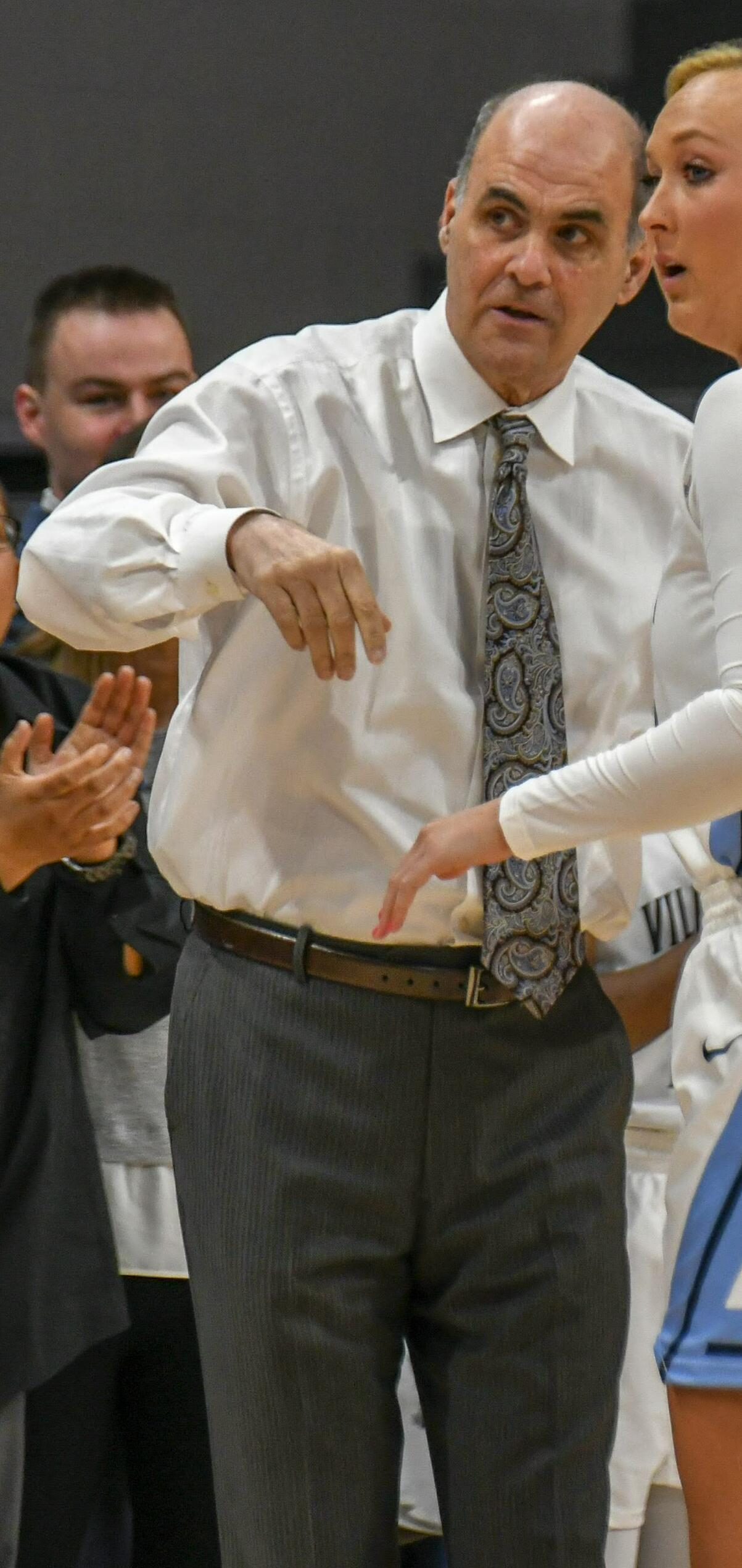
- Parretta in 2019

Biographical details
- Born: July 22, 1955 (age 71); Upper Darby Township, Pennsylvania, U.S.

Playing career
- 1974–1975: Lycoming

Coaching career (HC unless noted)
- 1978–2020: Villanova

Head coaching record
- Overall: 783–489

Accomplishments and honors

Awards
- Big East Coach of the Year Award (1996); 5× Philadelphia Big 5 Coach of the Year (1995, 1996, 2001, 2003, 2004); Carol Eckman Award (2020)

Harry F. Perretta Jr. (born July 22, 1955) is a retired American basketball coach who served as the head coach of the women's basketball team at Villanova University from 1978 to 2020. When he was hired at the age of 22, he became the youngest coach to ever head a women's varsity program at Villanova.

== Coaching career ==
At the time that Perretta interviewed for the position of head coach, he was one of 65 applicants. He had been out of college only two months at the time, which initially prompted Villanova to drop him from serious consideration. However, Dutch Burch, the head coach at Lycoming College, sent in a letter of recommendation to Villanova—Perretta had suffered a career-ending injury to his ankle while a freshman at Lycoming, and Burch persuaded Perretta to become a student assistant coach. Perretta also coached the junior varsity team for two years. Burch's letter helped persuade Villanova to give Perretta a chance. At the time, the women's head coaching position was part-time, and Perretta frequently came to practices wearing the work boots he wore in his morning job laying cement.

The school made it to the Final Four of the 1982 AIAW tournament, the last year that tournament was held.

Teams he has coached have earned invitations to many postseason tournaments. The 2002–03 team advanced as far as the Elite Eight.

Perretta announced on October 30, 2019 that he would retire at the end of the 2019–20 season. At the time, he had been dealing with health issues for several years. His 42nd and final season at Villanova tied him with Yvonne Kaufmann, who coached at NCAA Division III Elizabethtown from 1971 to 2012, for the most seasons as head coach at a single school in NCAA women's basketball history (including seasons in which women's sports were governed by the AIAW).

== Broadcasting career ==
Following his retirement, Perretta began broadcasting with FOX Sports and the BIG EAST Digital Network. He debuted on FS1 in a regular season game between Villanova and St. John's on January 2, 2022 and continue to work as an analyst through the 2021-22 season. Perretta was also part of the coverage team at the 2022 BIG EAST Tournament, calling games and working as a studio analyst.

== Personal life ==
Perretta has been married since 1996; his wife Helen played for him in the 1980s, but they did not date until 1995. At the time, he was helping take care of his ailing mother. He proposed to Helen about a month after his mother's death. In a 2020 ESPN story, Helen said, "His mother was the most important thing to him. After she passed, he could move on." They have two sons, both of whom were attending Villanova in their father's final season on the bench.

Every June, Perretta and his wife visit the Poor Clares convent in Alexandria, Virginia to deliver supplies to the cloistered nuns living there. As part of an arrangement he made with the order, they visit with arguably the greatest player he coached—Shelly Pennefather, now known as Sister Rose Marie, who lives at the convent. They are separated by a glass screen during the visits, in keeping with the order's rules. For the 25th anniversary of Pennefather's final vows in 2019, marked by Sister Rose Marie renewing her vows, Perretta was one of several close friends and family members who were able to hug her for the first time since her final vows.

== Awards and honors ==
- 1995—Philadelphia Big 5 Coach of the Year
- 1996—Big East Coach of the Year
- 1996—Philadelphia Big 5 Coach of the Year
- 2001—Philadelphia Big 5 Coach of the Year
- 2003—Philadelphia Big 5 Coach of the Year
- 2004—Philadelphia Big 5 Coach of the Year
- 2007—Lycoming Athletic Hall of Fame in 2007
- 2011—Philadelphia Sports Writers Association Special Achievement Award
- Special Achievement – Charlie Manuel (Phillies manager)

== Head coaching record ==
Record table
Season	Team	Overall	Conference	Standing	Postseason
Villanova Wildcats (Atlantic 10 Conference) (1978–1980)
1978-79	Villanova	17-8			
1979-80	Villanova	20-5			
Villanova:		37–13 (.740)			
Villanova Wildcats (Big East (original)) (1980–2013)
1980-81	Villanova	22-6			
1981-82	Villanova	29-4			AIAW
1982-83	Villanova	14-15	4-4	t4th	
1983-84	Villanova	22-7	6-2	t1st	
1984-85	Villanova	21-9	12-4	t1st	
1985-86	Villanova	23-8	12-4	t2nd	NCAA Second Round
1986-87	Villanova	27-4	15-1	1st	NCAA First round
1987-88	Villanova	20-9	11-5	2nd	NCAA First round
1988-89	Villanova	18-12	11-5	2nd	NCAA First round
1989-90	Villanova	9-19	1-15	9th	
1990-91	Villanova	12-17	4-12	8th	
1991-92	Villanova	11-17	7-11	t3rd	
1992-93	Villanova	15-13	10-8	t4th	
1993-94	Villanova	13-14	7-11	t6th	
1994-95	Villanova	19-9	13-5	2nd	
1995-96	Villanova	21-7	13-5	3rd, BE6	
1996-97	Villanova	14-14	8-10	5th, BE6	
1997-98	Villanova	19-10	12-6	t2nd, BE6	WNIT
1998-99	Villanova	14-14	9-9	t6th	
1999-00	Villanova	15-15	7-9	t6th	WNIT
2000-01	Villanova	22-9	11-5	t4th	NCAA Second Round
2001-02	Villanova	20-11	12-4	t3rd	NCAA Second Round
2002-03	Villanova	28-6	12-4	t3rd	NCAA Elite Eight
2003-04	Villanova	23-7	12-4	t2nd	NCAA Second Round
2004-05	Villanova	19-12	10-6	t4th	WNIT
2005-06	Villanova	21-11	9-7	t6th	WNIT
2006-07	Villanova	8-21	2-14	16th	
2007-08	Villanova	17-16	5-11	t11th	WNIT
2008-09	Villanova	19-14	12-4	t4th	NCAA First round
2009-10	Villanova	14-16	3-13	15th	
2010-11	Villanova	12-19	3-13	t13th	
2011-12	Villanova	19-15	6-10	t10th	WNIT
2012-13	Villanova	21–11	9–7	t6th	NCAA First round
Villanova:		601–391 (.606)	268–228 (.540)		
Villanova Wildcats (Big East (current)) (2014–2020)
2013-14	Villanova	23–9	12–6	t3rd	WNIT Second Round
2014-15	Villanova	22–14	12–6	3rd	WNIT Quarterfinals
2015-16	Villanova	20–12	12–6	3rd	WNIT Second Round
2016-17	Villanova	20–15	11–7	t4th	WNIT Semifinals
2017-18	Villanova	23–9	12–6	3rd	NCAA Second Round
2018–19	Villanova	19–13	9–9	T-4th	WNIT Second Round
2019–20	Villanova	18–13	11–7	T-3rd	
Villanova:		145–82 (.639)	79–47 (.627)		
Total:		783–489 (.616)			
National champion Postseason invitational champion Conference regular season champion Conference regular season and conference tournament champion Division regular season champion Division regular season and conference tournament champion Conference tournament champion

== See also ==
- List of college women's basketball career coaching wins leaders
