= St. Bonaventure Bonnies basketball =

St. Bonaventure Bonnies basketball may refer to either of the basketball teams that represent St. Bonaventure University:

- St. Bonaventure Bonnies men's basketball
- St. Bonaventure Bonnies women's basketball
