= Anthony Bozzella =

American basketball coach (born 1965)

Current position
- Title: Head Coach
- Team: Seton Hall
- Conference: Big East
- Record: 249–165 (.601)

Biographical details
- Born: November 21, 1965 (age 60)
- Education: Seton Hall ('89)

Coaching career (HC unless noted)
- 1992–2000: Southampton
- 2000–2002: LIU Brooklyn
- 2002–2013: Iona
- 2013–present: Seton Hall

Head coaching record
- Overall: 555–483 (.535)

Anthony Joseph "Tony" Bozzella (born November 21, 1965) is the current head coach of the Seton Hall University women's basketball team.

== Head coaching record ==
Record table
Season	Team	Overall	Conference	Standing	Postseason
Southampton (New York Athletic Conference) (1992–2000)
1992–93	Southampton	3–21	1–17		
1993–94	Southampton	11–16	8–10		
1994–95	Southampton	17–11	14–6		
1995–96	Southampton	16–11	12–8		
1996–97	Southampton	17–13			
1997–98	Southampton	17–12			
1998–99	Southampton	19–11			
1999–00	Southampton	20–9			
Southampton:		120–104 (.536)	35–41 (.461)		
LIU Brooklyn (Northeastern Conference) (2000–2002)
2000–01	LIU Brooklyn	16–15	11–7	T-3rd	NCAA 1st Round
2001–02	LIU Brooklyn	18–12	13–5	T-2nd	
LIU Brooklyn:		34–27 (.557)	24–12 (.667)		
Iona (MAAC) (2002–2013)
2002–03	Iona	1–27	0–18	10th	
2003–04	Iona	7–21	6–12	T-9th	
2004–05	Iona	6–22	4–14	10th	
2005–06	Iona	17–12	14–6	T-3rd	
2006–07	Iona	21–13	14–5	2nd	WNIT Second Round
2007–08	Iona	20–14	11–7	T-2nd	WNIT Second Round
2008–09	Iona	18–13	10–8	T-4th	
2009–10	Iona	18–14	13–5	2nd	WNIT First Round
2010–11	Iona	11–20	7–11	6th	
2011–12	Iona	13–18	8–10	7th	
2012–13	Iona	20–13	13–5	2nd	WNIT First Round
Iona:		152–187 (.448)	100–101 (.498)		
Seton Hall (Big East) (2013–present)
2013–14	Seton Hall	20–14	8–10	7th	WNIT Third Round
2014–15	Seton Hall	28–6	15–3	T-1st	NCAA 1st Round
2015–16	Seton Hall	23–9	12–6	T-2nd	NCAA 1st Round
2016–17	Seton Hall	12–19	4–14	T-7th	
2017–18	Seton Hall	16–16	7–11	7th	WNIT First Round
2018–19	Seton Hall	15–16	7–11	T-8th	WNIT First Round
2019–20	Seton Hall	19–12	11–7	T-3rd	(canceled)
2020–21	Seton Hall	14–7	12–5	3rd	(declined)
2021–22	Seton Hall	24–13	12–8	6th	WNIT Runner-up
2022–23	Seton Hall	19–15	10–10	6th	WNIT Second Round
2023–24	Seton Hall	17–15	8–10	7th	WBIT First Round
2024–25	Seton Hall	23–10	13–5	3rd	WBIT Second Round
2025–26	Seton Hall	19–13	12–8	3rd	WBIT First Round
Seton Hall:		249–165 (.601)	131–108 (.548)		
Total:		555–483 (.535)			
National champion Postseason invitational champion Conference regular season champion Conference regular season and conference tournament champion Division regular season champion Division regular season and conference tournament champion Conference tournament champion
