= James Howard (basketball) =

American basketball coach

Current position
- Title: Head coach
- Team: Bridgeport
- Conference: CACC

Biographical details
- Born: November 16, 1969 (age 56); Washington, D.C.
- Education: Greensboro (1991)

Coaching career (HC unless noted)

Men's basketball
- 1987–1989: Greensboro (SA)
- 1989–1991: Wesley (DE) (assistant)

Women's basketball
- 1991–1997: Wesley (DE)
- 1998–1999: Georgetown (director of basketball ops.)
- 1999–2000: Maryland (assistant)
- 2000–2007: George Mason (assistant/RC)
- 2007–2008: Delaware State (assistant)
- 2008–2010: Howard (assistant/RC)
- 2010–2011: Howard (associate HC/RC)
- 2011–2012: Bethune–Cookman (assistant/RC)
- 2012–2015: Bethune–Cookman (associate HC)
- 2015–2017: Georgetown (associate HC)
- 2017–2023: Georgetown
- 2023–present: Bridgeport

Head coaching record
- Overall: 141–175 (.446)
- Tournaments: 4–2 (WNIT)

James Howard (born November 16, 1969) is an American basketball coach who served as the head women's basketball coach at Georgetown University from 2017 until 2023.

== Career ==
A native of Washington, D.C., he has spent the majority of his coaching career in the Washington metropolitan area.

== Head coaching record ==
Record table
Season	Team	Overall	Conference	Standing	Postseason
Wesley (DE) Wolverines (1991–1997)
1991–92	Wesley (DE)	13–14			
1992–93	Wesley (DE)	22–3			
1993–94	Wesley (DE)	5–15			
1994–95	Wesley (DE)	9–14			
1995–96	Wesley (DE)	14–11			
1996–97	Wesley (DE)	12–12			
Wesley (DE):		75–69 (.521)			
Georgetown Hoyas (Big East Conference) (2017–2023)
2017–18	Georgetown	16–16	9–9	T–5th	WNIT Second Round
2018–19	Georgetown	19–16	9–9	T–4th	WNIT Quarterfinals
2019–20	Georgetown	5–25	2–16	T–9th	
2020–21	Georgetown	2–15	2–14	11th	
2021–22	Georgetown	10–19	4–15	T–9th	
2022–23	Georgetown	14–17	6–14	T–8th	
Georgetown:		66–106 (.384)	32–78 (.291)		
Total:		141–175 (.446)			
National champion Postseason invitational champion Conference regular season champion Conference regular season and conference tournament champion Division regular season champion Division regular season and conference tournament champion Conference tournament champion
