= 2018–19 Creighton Bluejays women's basketball team =

Intercollegiate basketball season

2018–19 Creighton Bluejays women's basketball
- Conference: Big East
- Record: 15–16 (8–10 Big East)
- Head coach: Jim Flanery (16th season)
- Assistant coaches: Carli Tritz; Chevelle Saunsoci; Linda Sayavongchanh
- Home arena: D. J. Sokol Arena

2018–19 Big East Conference women's basketball standings
	Conf.				Overall
Team	W		L	PCT	W		L	PCT
No. 18 Marquette	15	–	3	.833	27	–	8	.771
No. 24 DePaul †	14	–	4	.778	26	–	8	.765
Butler	11	–	7	.611	23	–	10	.697
Villanova	9	–	9	.500	19	–	13	.594
Georgetown	9	–	9	.500	19	–	15	.559
Providence	8	–	10	.444	19	–	16	.543
Creighton	8	–	10	.444	15	–	16	.484
Seton Hall	7	–	11	.389	15	–	16	.484
St. John's	7	–	11	.389	15	–	16	.484
Xavier	2	–	16	.111	11	–	19	.367
† 2019 Big East tournament winner As of March 12, 2019; Rankings from AP poll

The 2018–19 Creighton Bluejays women's basketball team represented Creighton University in the 2018–19 NCAA Division I women's basketball season. The Bluejays, led by sixteenth year head coach Jim Flanery, played their home games at D. J. Sokol Arena and were members of the Big East Conference. They finished the season 15–16, 8–10 in Big East play to finish in a tie for seventh place. They advanced to the semifinals of the Big East women's tournament, where they lost to DePaul.

== Roster ==
2018–19 Creighton Bluejays women's basketball team
Players
Coaches

Pos.	#	Name	Height	Year	Previous school	Hometown
G	1	Jade Owens	5 ft 6 in (1.68 m)	RS Sr	Fenwick	River Forest, IL
G	2	Tatum Rembao	5 ft 9 in (1.75 m)	So	Loveland	Loveland, CO
G	4	Temi Carda	5 ft 7 in (1.7 m)	So	Lakeville North	Lakeville, MN
F	5	Jaylyn Agnew	5 ft 11 in (1.8 m)	RS Jr	Andover	Andover, KS
F	12	Gracey Griglione	6 ft 2 in (1.88 m)	RS Fr	Interstate 35	Truro, IA
G	13	Rachael Saunders	5 ft 9 in (1.75 m)	Fr	Iowa City West	Iowa City, IA
G	21	Olivia Elger	5 ft 7 in (1.7 m)	RS Jr	Richwoods	Peoria, IL
G	22	Brooke Kissinger	5 ft 7 in (1.7 m)	RS Sr	Minden; Illinois	Minden, NE
F	23	Morgan Turner	6 ft 2 in (1.88 m)	RS Jr	Meade County; Lipscomb	Guston, KY
G	24	Chloe Dworak	5 ft 6 in (1.68 m)	Fr	Lincoln Christian	Lincoln, NE
G	33	Payton Brotzki	5 ft 11 in (1.8 m)	Fr	Platteview	Papillion, NE
F	40	Ali Greene	6 ft 1 in (1.85 m)	RS Jr	Mahtomedi	Lino Lakes, MN
F	45	Audrey Faber	6 ft 2 in (1.88 m)	Sr	Dowling Catholic	Clive, IA

Head coach

- Jim Flanery (Creighton)

Assistant coach(es)

- Carli Tritz (Creighton)
- Chevelle Saunsoci (Creighton)
- Linda Sayavongchanh (Drake)

Legend

- (C) Team captain
- (S) Suspended
- (I) Ineligible
- (W) Walk-on
- Injured
- Current redshirt

Roster

== Schedule ==
Date time, TV	Rank^{#}	Opponent^{#}	Result	Record	Site (attendance) city, state
Exhibition
Oct 23, 2018*; 7:00 pm		Nebraska–Kearney	W 100–68		D. J. Sokol Arena (853); Omaha, NE
Non-conference regular season
Nov 7, 2018*; 6:00 pm		South Dakota	L 65–77	0–1	D. J. Sokol Arena (1,006); Omaha, NE
Nov 9, 2018*; 5:00 pm, ESPN+		at North Dakota State	W 86–51	1–1	Scheels Center (507); Fargo, ND
Nov 15, 2018*; 7:00 pm		at South Dakota State	L 48–74	1–2	Frost Arena (1,713); Brookings, SD
Nov 20, 2018*; 6:00 pm, ESPN+		at Northern Iowa	L 55–65	1–3	McLeod Center (1,146); Cedar Falls, IA
Nov 28, 2018*; 12:00 pm		No. 24 Drake	L 69–85	1–4	D. J. Sokol Arena (1,535); Omaha, NE
Dec 2, 2018*; 1:00 pm, FSGO		Nebraska	W 74–65	2–4	D. J. Sokol Arena (1,533); Omaha, NE
Dec 5, 2018*; 7:00 pm, FSGO		Omaha	W 66–51	3–4	D. J. Sokol Arena (863); Omaha, NE
Dec 8, 2018*; 2:00 pm		at Wichita State	W 83–71	4–4	Charles Koch Arena (1,702); Wichita, KS
Dec 16, 2018*; 1:00 pm		at Florida State	L 52–71	4–5	Donald L. Tucker Center (2,501); Tallahassee, FL
Dec 20, 2018*; 5:15 pm		vs. South Florida; Florida Sunshine Classic	W 83–76	5–5	Warden Arena (481); Winter Haven, FL
Dec 21, 2018*; 7:30 pm		vs. Vanderbilt; Florida Sunshine Classic	W 75–55	6–5	Warden Arena (365); Winter Haven, FL
Big East regular season
Dec 29, 2018; 7:00 pm, BEDN		at No. 20 DePaul	W 85–82	7–5 (1–0)	McGrath-Phillips Arena (1,723); Chicago, IL
Dec 31, 2018; 2:00 pm, BEDN		at No. 20 Marquette	L 67–85	7–6 (1–1)	Al McGuire Center (1,407); Milwaukee, WI
Jan 4, 2019; 7:00 pm, BEDN		Villanova	L 52–54	7–7 (1–2)	D. J. Sokol Arena (1,102); Omaha, NE
Jan 6, 2019; 1:00 pm, CBSSN		Georgetown	W 65–38	8–7 (2–2)	D. J. Sokol Arena (1,056); Omaha, NE
Jan 11, 2019; 10:00 am, BEDN		at Seton Hall	L 75–82	8–8 (2–3)	Walsh Gymnasium (1,473); South Orange, NJ
Jan 13, 2019; 1:00 pm, BEDN		at St. John's	W 65–63	9–8 (3–3)	Carnesecca Arena (602); Queens, NY
Jan 18, 2019; 7:00 pm, BEDN		Xavier	W 66–62 ^{OT}	10–8 (4–3)	D. J. Sokol Arena (993); Omaha, NE
Jan 20, 2019; 2:00 pm, FS1		Butler	L 43–75	10–9 (4–4)	D. J. Sokol Arena (1,083); Omaha, NE
Jan 26, 2019; 1:00 pm, BEDN		Providence	L 63–77	10–10 (4–5)	D. J. Sokol Arena (816); Omaha, NE
Feb 1, 2019; 6:00 pm, BEDN		at Georgetown	L 53–62	10–11 (4–6)	McDonough Gymnasium (649); Washington, D.C.
Feb 3, 2019; 1:00 pm, FS1		at Villanova	L 62–67 ^{2OT}	10–12 (4–7)	Finneran Pavilion (651); Villanova, PA
Feb 8, 2019; 7:00 pm, BEDN		St. John's	L 45–51	10–13 (4–8)	D. J. Sokol Arena (848); Omaha, NE
Feb 10, 2019; 1:00 pm, FS2		Seton Hall	W 80–71	11–13 (5–8)	D. J. Sokol Arena (1,060); Omaha, NE
Feb 15, 2019; 6:00 pm, BEDN		at Butler	L 46–66	11–14 (5–9)	Hinkle Fieldhouse (882); Indianapolis, IN
Feb 17, 2019; 1:00 pm, BEDN		at Xavier	W 53–52	12–14 (6–9)	Cintas Center (912); Cincinnati, OH
Feb 23, 2019; 3:00 pm, BEDN		at Providence	W 73–64	13–14 (7–9)	Alumni Hall (486); Providence, RI
Mar 1, 2019; 7:00 pm, BEDN		No. 13 Marquette	W 71–65	14–14 (8–9)	D. J. Sokol Arena (1,111); Omaha, NE
Mar 3, 2019; 1:00 pm, FS2		DePaul	L 67–74	14–15 (8–10)	D. J. Sokol Arena (1,148); Omaha, NE
Big East Women's Tournament
Mar 10, 2019; 8:30 pm, FS2	(6)	vs. (3) Butler; Quarterfinals	W 60–51	15–15	Wintrust Arena (2,164); Chicago, IL
Mar 11, 2019; 5:30 pm, FS1	(6)	vs. (2) DePaul; Semifinals	L 69–80	15–16	Wintrust Arena (1,853); Chicago, IL
*Non-conference game. ^{#}Rankings from AP Poll. (#) Tournament seedings in parentheses. All times are in Central.

== Rankings ==
2018–19 NCAA Division I women's basketball rankings

Regular season polls
Poll	Pre- Season	Week 2	Week 3	Week 4	Week 5	Week 6	Week 7	Week 8	Week 9	Week 10	Week 11	Week 12	Week 13	Week 14	Week 15	Week 16	Week 17	Week 18	Week 19	Final
AP																				N/A
Coaches																				

Legend
	Increase in ranking
	Decrease in ranking
	No change
(RV)	Received votes
(NR)	Not ranked

== See also ==
2018–19 Creighton Bluejays men's basketball team
