= Jim Crowley (basketball) =

American basketball coach

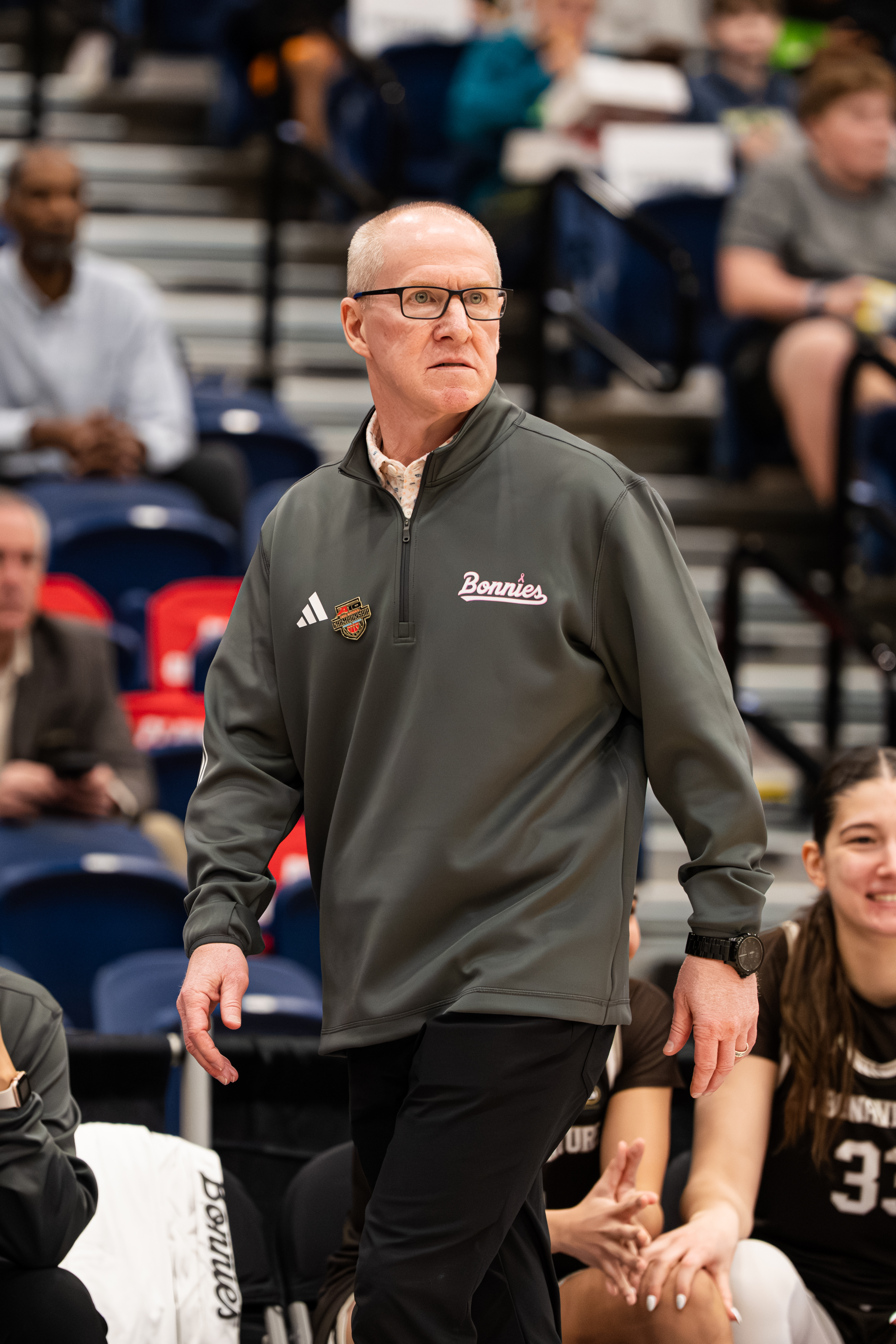
- Crowley during the 2026 A10 Women's Basketball tournament at Henrico Sports & Events Center

Current position
- Title: Head coach
- Team: St. Bonaventure
- Conference: Atlantic 10
- Record: 285–297 (.490)

Biographical details
- Born: October 4, 1970 (age 55); Windsor, New York

Playing career
- 1989–1993: Keuka

Coaching career (HC unless noted)
- 1993–1996: Keuka
- 1996–1999: St. Bonaventure (assistant)
- 1999–2000: St. Bonaventure (associate HC)
- 2000–2016: St. Bonaventure
- 2016–2023: Providence
- 2023–present: St. Bonaventure

Head coaching record
- Overall: 409–460 (.471)
- Tournaments: 3–2 (NCAA); 8–6 (WNIT)

Accomplishments and honors

Championships
- 1x A-10 regular season (2012)

Awards
- ESPN National Coach of the Year (2012); 3× A-10 Coach of the Year (2009, 2012, 2014)

Jim Crowley (born October 4, 1970) is an American basketball coach who is currently in his 2nd stint as the head women's basketball coach at St. Bonaventure University. He was previously the head coach at Providence College, and before that, he was the head coach at St. Bonaventure University.

== Head coaching record ==
Record table
Season	Team	Overall	Conference	Standing	Postseason
Keuka Storm (1993–1996)
1993–94	Keuka	14–11			
1994–95	Keuka	18–10			
1995–96	Keuka	7–17			
Keuka:		39–38 (.506)			
St. Bonaventure Bonnies (Atlantic 10 Conference) (2000–2016)
2000–01	St. Bonaventure	7–21	3–13	10th	
2001–02	St. Bonaventure	13–15	7–9	9th	
2002–03	St. Bonaventure	6–22	3–13	12th	
2003–04	St. Bonaventure	9–19	5–11	9th	
2004–05	St. Bonaventure	9–19	4–12	T–11th	
2005–06	St. Bonaventure	8–19	3–12	14th	
2006–07	St. Bonaventure	16–15	6–8	10th	
2007–08	St. Bonaventure	18–12	6–8	T–7th	
2008–09	St. Bonaventure	23–11	10–6	T–4th	WNIT Quarterfinals
2009–10	St. Bonaventure	23–10	9–5	T–4th	WNIT Second Round
2010–11	St. Bonaventure	21–12	9–5	T–3rd	WNIT Second Round
2011–12	St. Bonaventure	31–4	14–0	1st	NCAA Division I Sweet Sixteen
2012–13	St. Bonaventure	10–19	3–11	14th	
2013–14	St. Bonaventure	24–11	11–5	T–2nd	WNIT Second Round
2014–15	St. Bonaventure	15–15	5–11	T–9th	
2015–16	St. Bonaventure	24–8	12–4	4th	NCAA Division I Round of 32
Providence Friars (Big East Conference) (2016–2023)
2016–17	Providence	12–18	4–14	T–7th	
2017–18	Providence	10–21	3–15	T–9th	
2018–19	Providence	19–16	8–10	T–6th	WNIT Third Round
2019–20	Providence	13–19	3–15	8th	
2020–21	Providence	7–14	4–10	7th	
2021–22	Providence	11–19	6–14	8th	
2022–23	Providence	13–18	4–16	10th	
Providence:		85–125 (.405)	32–94 (.254)		
St. Bonaventure Bonnies (Atlantic 10 Conference) (2024–present)
2023–24	St. Bonaventure	4–26	1–17	15th	
2024–25	St. Bonaventure	6–24	2–16	15th	
2025–26	St. Bonaventure	17–16	7–11	T–9th	WNIT Second Round
St. Bonaventure:		285–297 (.490)	120–177 (.404)		
Total:		409–460 (.471)			
National champion Postseason invitational champion Conference regular season champion Conference regular season and conference tournament champion Division regular season champion Division regular season and conference tournament champion Conference tournament champion
