= 2018–19 Marquette Golden Eagles women's basketball team =

Intercollegiate basketball season

2018–19 Marquette Golden Eagles women's basketball
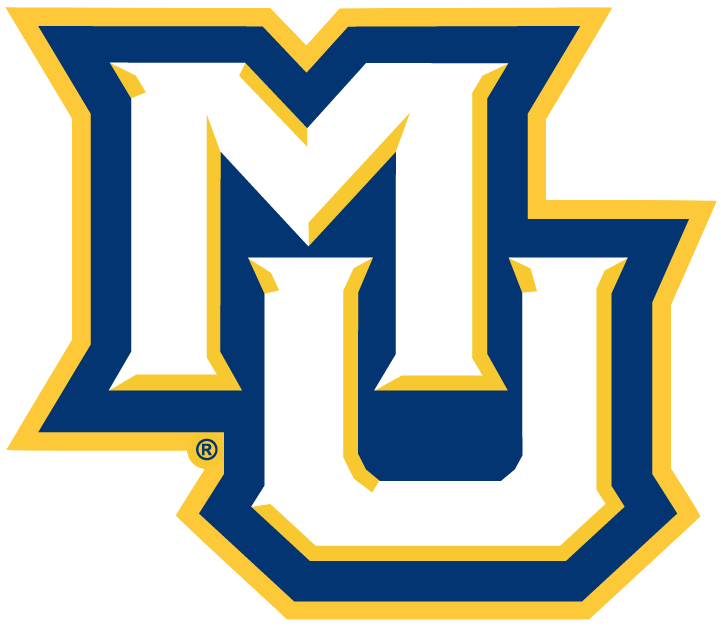

Big East regular season champions

NCAA tournament, second round
- Conference: Big East Conference

Ranking
- Coaches: No. 19
- AP: No. 18
- Record: 27–8 (15–3 Big East)
- Head coach: Carolyn Kieger (5th season)
- Assistant coaches: Ginny Boggess; Scott Merritt; Vernette Skeete
- Home arena: Al McGuire Center

2018–19 Big East Conference women's basketball standings
| | Conf. | | | | Overall |
| Team | W | | L | PCT | W | | L | PCT |
|---|---|---|---|---|---|---|---|---|
| No. 18 Marquette | 15 | – | 3 | .833 | 27 | – | 8 | .771 |
| No. 24 DePaul † | 14 | – | 4 | .778 | 26 | – | 8 | .765 |
| Butler | 11 | – | 7 | .611 | 23 | – | 10 | .697 |
| Villanova | 9 | – | 9 | .500 | 19 | – | 13 | .594 |
| Georgetown | 9 | – | 9 | .500 | 19 | – | 15 | .559 |
| Providence | 8 | – | 10 | .444 | 19 | – | 16 | .543 |
| Creighton | 8 | – | 10 | .444 | 15 | – | 16 | .484 |
| Seton Hall | 7 | – | 11 | .389 | 15 | – | 16 | .484 |
| St. John's | 7 | – | 11 | .389 | 15 | – | 16 | .484 |
| Xavier | 2 | – | 16 | .111 | 11 | – | 19 | .367 |
† 2019 Big East tournament winner As of March 12, 2019; Rankings from AP poll

The 2018–19 Marquette Golden Eagles women's basketball team represented Marquette University in the 2018–19 NCAA Division I women's basketball season. The Golden Eagles, led by fifth year head coach Carolyn Kieger, play their home games at the Al McGuire Center and were members of the Big East Conference. They finished the season 27–8, 15–3 in Big East in Big East play to win the Big East regular season title. They advanced to the championship game of the Big East women's tournament where they lost to DePaul. They received an at-large bid to the NCAA women's tournament where they defeated Rice in the first round before losing to Texas A&M in the second round.

On April 3, Kieger left her alma mater after five seasons, the last three of which ended in NCAA tournament appearances, for the Penn State opening. She finished with a 5 year record of 99–64.

== Previous season ==
They finished the 2017–18 season 24–10, 16–2 in Big East play to share the regular season title with DePaul. They advanced to the championship game of the Big East women's tournament, where they lost to DePaul. They received an at-large bid to the NCAA women's tournament, where they defeated Dayton in the first round before losing to Louisville in the second round.

== Roster ==
2018–19 Marquette Golden Eagles women's basketball team
Players
Coaches

| Pos. | # | Name | Height | Year | Previous school | Hometown |
|---|---|---|---|---|---|---|
| F | 0 | Tori McCoy | 6 ft 4 in (1.93 m) | RS So | St. Thomas More; Ohio State | Champaign, IL |
| G | 1 | Danielle King | 5 ft 5 in (1.65 m) | Sr | Bloom Township | Chicago, IL |
| G | 5 | Natisha Hiedeman | 5 ft 8 in (1.73 m) | Sr | Green Bay Southwest | Green Bay, WI |
| F | 10 | Sandra Dahling | 5 ft 9 in (1.75 m) | Sr | Soina Gymnasium | Stockholm, Sweden |
| G | 11 | Allazia Blockton | 6 ft 0 in (1.83 m) | Sr | Dominican | Milwaukee, WI |
| F | 12 | Erika Davenport | 5 ft 11 in (1.8 m) | Sr | Clarkston | Clarkston, MI |
| G | 15 | Amani Wilborn | 5 ft 9 in (1.75 m) | Sr | Riverside University | Milwaukee, WI |
| F | 20 | Altia Anderson | 6 ft 2 in (1.88 m) | Jr | Woodbridge | Bridgeville, DE |
| F | 21 | Amanda Maqueia | 6 ft 4 in (1.93 m) | Jr | New Mexico JC | Presidente Prudente, Brazil |
| G | 24 | Selena Lott | 5 ft 11 in (1.8 m) | So | Columbia | East Greenbush, NY |
| G | 30 | Isabelle Spingola | 6 ft 0 in (1.83 m) | Jr | Whitney Young | Chicago, IL |
| G | 42 | Lauren Van Kleunen | 6 ft 2 in (1.88 m) | RS So | Mason | Mason, OH |
| F | 52 | Chloe Marotta | 6 ft 1 in (1.85 m) | Fr | Homestead | Mequon, WI |

Head coach

- Carolyn Kieger (Marquette)

Assistant coach(es)

- Ginny Boggess (Wingate)
- Scott Merritt (Marquette)
- Vernette Skeete (Alcorn State)

Legend

- (C) Team captain
- (S) Suspended
- (I) Ineligible
- (W) Walk-on
- Injured
- Current redshirt

Roster

== Schedule ==
| Date time, TV | Rank^{#} | Opponent^{#} | Result | Record | Site (attendance) city, state |
Exhibition
| Nov 1, 2018*; 6:00 pm | No. 19 | Grand Valley State | L 75–77 | | Al McGuire Center (927); Milwaukee, WI |
Non-conference regular season
| Nov 6, 2018*; 11:30 am | No. 19 | South Dakota State | W 91–52 | 1–0 | Al McGuire Center (2,430); Milwaukee, WI |
| Nov 9, 2018*; 7:00 pm | No. 19 | Montana State; Preseason WNIT First Round | W 100–52 | 2–0 | Al McGuire Center (1,202); Milwaukee, WI |
| Nov 11, 2018*; 1:00 pm | No. 19 | Northern Iowa; Preseason WNIT Quarterfinals | W 102–61 | 3–0 | Al McGuire Center (966); Milwaukee, WI |
| Nov 15, 2018*; 6:00 pm | No. 19 | at No. 24 Miami (FL); Preseason WNIT Semifinals | L 55–63 | 3–1 | Watsco Center (855); Coral Gables, FL |
| Nov 24, 2018*; 2:00 pm | No. 22 | UIC | W 96–32 | 4–1 | Fiserv Forum (1,062); Milwaukee, WI |
| Nov 28, 2018*; 7:00 pm | No. 22 | at Milwaukee | W 83–74 | 5–1 | UW–Milwaukee Panther Arena (872); Milwaukee, WI |
| Dec 2, 2018*; 4:00 pm | No. 22 | Michigan | W 85–74 | 6–1 | Al McGuire Center (1,469); Milwaukee, WI |
| Dec 6, 2018*; 7:00 pm | No. 18 | at No. 6 Mississippi State | L 82–87 | 6–2 | Humphrey Coliseum (7,273); Starkville, MS |
| Dec 9, 2018*; 1:00 pm, BTN | No. 18 | at Northwestern | W 76–57 | 7–2 | Welsh–Ryan Arena (1,467); Evanston, IL |
| Dec 15, 2018*; 2:00 pm | No. 19 | Green Bay | W 80–54 | 8–2 | Al McGuire Center (1,801); Milwaukee, WI |
| Dec 17, 2018*; 7:00 pm | No. 19 | Binghamton | W 93–40 | 9–2 | Al McGuire Center (920); Milwaukee, WI |
| Dec 22, 2018*; 12:30 pm, FS1 | No. 19 | No. 2 Notre Dame | L 63–87 | 9–3 | Al McGuire Center (3,700); Milwaukee, WI |
Big East regular season
| Dec 29, 2018; 2:00 pm, BEDN | No. 22 | Providence | W 85–46 | 10–3 (1–0) | Al McGuire Center (1,826); Milwaukee, WI |
| Dec 31, 2018; 2:00 pm, BEDN | No. 20 | Creighton | W 85–67 | 11–3 (2–0) | Al McGuire Center (1,407); Milwaukee, WI |
| Jan 4, 2019; 7:00 pm, FS1 | No. 20 | No. 24 DePaul | W 96–63 | 12–3 (3–0) | Al McGuire Center (1,613); Milwaukee, WI |
| Jan 11, 2019; 10:30 am, BEDN | No. 15 | at Villanova | W 91–55 | 13–3 (4–0) | Finneran Pavilion (1,401); Villanova, PA |
| Jan 13, 2019; 1:00 pm, BEDN | No. 15 | at Georgetown | W 72–62 | 14–3 (5–0) | McDonough Gymnasium (203); Washington, D.C. |
| Jan 18, 2019; 11:30 am, BEDN | No. 14 | Seton Hall | W 96–60 | 15–3 (6–0) | Al McGuire Center (3,700); Milwaukee, WI |
| Jan 20, 2019; 2:00 pm, BEDN | No. 14 | St. John's | W 83–73 | 16–3 (7–0) | Al McGuire Center (1,451); Milwaukee, WI |
| Jan 25, 2019; 6:00 pm, BEDN | No. 10 | at Xavier | W 90–44 | 17–3 (8–0) | Cintas Center (943); Cincinnati, OH |
| Jan 27, 2019; 1:00 pm, BEDN | No. 10 | at Butler | W 87–58 | 18–3 (9–0) | Hinkle Fieldhouse (1,437); Indianapolis, IN |
| Feb 3, 2019; 1:00 pm, BEDN | No. 10 | at DePaul | W 93–87 | 19–3 (10–0) | McGrath-Phillips Arena (1,979); Chicago, IL |
| Feb 8, 2019; 7:00 pm, FS1 | No. 8 | Georgetown | W 59–52 | 20–3 (11–0) | Al McGuire Center (2,061); Milwaukee, WI |
| Feb 10, 2019; 2:00 pm, BEDN/FSWI | No. 8 | Villanova | W 93–55 | 21–3 (12–0) | Al McGuire Center (2,234); Milwaukee, WI |
| Feb 15, 2019; 6:00 pm, BEDN | No. 8 | at St. John's | L 74–81 | 21–4 (12–1) | Carnesecca Arena (753); Queens, NY |
| Feb 17, 2019; 11:00 am, CBSSN | No. 8 | at Seton Hall | W 108–63 | 22–4 (13–1) | Walsh Gymnasium (924); South Orange, NJ |
| Feb 22, 2019; 7:00 pm, BEDN | No. 11 | Butler | L 57–61 | 22–5 (13–2) | Al McGuire Center (2,003); Milwaukee, WI |
| Feb 24, 2019; 2:00 pm, BEDN | No. 11 | Xavier | W 79–53 | 23–5 (14–2) | Al McGuire Center (2,187); Milwaukee, WI |
| Mar 1, 2019; 7:00 pm, BEDN | No. 13 | at Creighton | L 65–71 | 23–6 (14–3) | D. J. Sokol Arena (1,111); Omaha, NE |
| Mar 3, 2019; 12:00 pm, BEDN | No. 13 | at Providence | W 80–57 | 24–6 (15–3) | Alumni Hall (578); Providence, RI |
Big East Women's Tournament
| Mar 10, 2019; 12:00 pm, FS2 | (1) No. 17 | vs. (9) St. John's; Quarterfinals | W 88–57 | 25–6 | Wintrust Arena; Chicago, IL |
| Mar 11, 2019; 3:00 pm, FS1 | (1) No. 13 | vs. (4) Georgetown; Semifinals | W 75–62 | 26–6 | Wintrust Arena; Chicago, IL |
| Mar 12, 2019; 7:00 pm, FS1 | (1) No. 13 | vs. (2) DePaul; Championship Game | L 73–74 | 26–7 | Wintrust Arena (2,407); Chicago, IL |
NCAA Women's Tournament
| Mar 22, 2019*; 1:00 pm, ESPN2 | (5 C) No. 18 | vs. (12 C) No. 24 Rice; First Round | W 58–54 ^{OT} | 27–7 | Reed Arena; College Station, TX |
| Mar 24, 2019*; 1:00 pm, ESPN2 | (5 C) No. 18 | at (4 C) No. 14 Texas A&M; Second Round | L 76–78 | 27–8 | Reed Arena (2,767); College Station, TX |
*Non-conference game. ^{#}Rankings from AP Poll. (#) Tournament seedings in parentheses. C=Chicago Region. All times are in Central.

== Rankings ==
2018–19 NCAA Division I women's basketball rankings

Regular season polls
| Poll | Pre- Season | Week 2 | Week 3 | Week 4 | Week 5 | Week 6 | Week 7 | Week 8 | Week 9 | Week 10 | Week 11 | Week 12 | Week 13 | Week 14 | Week 15 | Week 16 | Week 17 | Week 18 | Week 19 | Final |
|---|---|---|---|---|---|---|---|---|---|---|---|---|---|---|---|---|---|---|---|---|
| AP | 19 | 19 | 22 | 22 | 18 | 19 | 19 | 22 | 20 | 15 | 14 | 10 | 10 | 8 | 8 | 11 | 13 | 17 | 13-T | N/A |
| Coaches | 19 | 19^ | 19 | 17 | 15 | 16-T | 17 | 19 | 16 | 14 | 13 | 9 | 9 | 7 | 7 | 11 | 12 | 17 | 13 | 19 |

Legend
| | Increase in ranking |
| | Decrease in ranking |
| | No change |
| (RV) | Received votes |
| (NR) | Not ranked |

^Coaches did not release a Week 2 poll.

== See also ==
2018–19 Marquette Golden Eagles men's basketball team
