= 2018–19 Butler Bulldogs women's basketball team =

Intercollegiate basketball season

2018–19 Butler Bulldogs women's basketball

WNIT, Third Round
- Conference: Big East
- Record: 23–10 (11–7 Big East)
- Head coach: Kurt Godlevske (5th season)
- Assistant coaches: John Marcum; Kierra McCleary; Gabe Henry
- Home arena: Hinkle Fieldhouse

2018–19 Big East Conference women's basketball standings
	Conf.				Overall
Team	W		L	PCT	W		L	PCT
No. 18 Marquette	15	–	3	.833	27	–	8	.771
No. 24 DePaul †	14	–	4	.778	26	–	8	.765
Butler	11	–	7	.611	23	–	10	.697
Villanova	9	–	9	.500	19	–	13	.594
Georgetown	9	–	9	.500	19	–	15	.559
Providence	8	–	10	.444	19	–	16	.543
Creighton	8	–	10	.444	15	–	16	.484
Seton Hall	7	–	11	.389	15	–	16	.484
St. John's	7	–	11	.389	15	–	16	.484
Xavier	2	–	16	.111	11	–	19	.367
† 2019 Big East tournament winner As of March 12, 2019; Rankings from AP poll

The 2018–19 Butler Bulldogs women's basketball team represented Butler University in the 2018–19 NCAA Division I women's basketball season. The Bulldogs, led by fifth year head coach Kurt Godlevske, played their home games at Hinkle Fieldhouse and were members of the Big East Conference. They finished the season 23–10, 11–7 in Big East play to finish in third place. They lost in the quarterfinals of the Big East women's tournament to Creighton. They received an automatic bid to the WNIT, where they defeated Northeastern and Kent State in the first and second rounds before losing to Cincinnati in third round.

== Previous season ==
The Bulldogs finished the season 15–17, 6–12 in Big East play to finish in eighth place. As the No. 8 seed in the Big East tournament, they defeated Providence before losing to Marquette in the quarterfinals.

== Roster ==
2018–19 Butler Bulldogs women's basketball team
Players
Coaches

Pos.	#	Name	Height	Year	Previous school	Hometown
G	1	Jamilyn Robinson	5 ft 10 in (1.78 m)	Fr	Ascension Christian	Gonzales, LA
G	4	Taylor Buford	5 ft 11 in (1.8 m)	Sr	Adlai Stevenson	Long Grove, IL
G	5	Emilia Sexton	5 ft 4 in (1.63 m)	Fr	Louisville Male	Louisville, KY
G/F	10	Naira Caceres	6 ft 1 in (1.85 m)	RS So	Colegio Manuel Peleteiro; Maine	Las Palmas de Gran Canaria, Spain
G	11	Michelle Weaver	5 ft 7 in (1.7 m)	Sr	Saint Joseph	South Bend, IN
C	12	Ashanti Thomas	6 ft 4 in (1.93 m)	RS Jr	Lafayette; Penn State	Lexington, KY
G/F	14	Sarah Humphrey	6 ft 0 in (1.83 m)	Jr	Crete-Monee	Crete, IL
G	15	Whitney Jennings	5 ft 5 in (1.65 m)	RS Sr	Logansport; Iowa	Logansport, IN
G	20	Jaia Alexander (redshirt)	5 ft 9 in (1.75 m)	Jr	Roland Park Country; Clemson	Baltimore, MD
G	22	Katherine Strong	5 ft 11 in (1.8 m)	RS Jr	Bloom; VCU	Chicago Heights, IL
G/F	23	Shae Brey	6 ft 0 in (1.83 m)	Jr	Eau Claire Regis	Altoona, WI
G	24	Kristen Spolyar	5 ft 10 in (1.78 m)	Jr	Lebanon	Lebanon, IN
F	25	Ellen Ross	5 ft 11 in (1.8 m)	Fr	Bishop Dwenger	Fort Wayne, IN
F/C	34	Tori Schickel	6 ft 1 in (1.85 m)	Sr	Mater Dei	Evansville, IN

Head coach

- Kurt Godlevske (Northern Michigan)

Assistant coach(es)

- John Marcum (East Central)
- Kierra McCleary (North Alabama)
- Gabe Henry (Missouri Valley)

Legend

- (C) Team captain
- (S) Suspended
- (I) Ineligible
- (W) Walk-on
- Injured
- Current redshirt

Roster

== Schedule ==
Date time, TV	Rank^{#}	Opponent^{#}	Result	Record	High points	High rebounds	High assists	Site (attendance) city, state
Exhibition
Nov 1, 2018*; 7:00 pm		Trine	W 69–31		–	–	–	Hinkle Fieldhouse; Indianapolis, IN
Non-conference regular season
Nov 9, 2018*; 12:00 pm		Eastern Illinois	W 72–37	1–0	16 – Schickel	12 – Schickel	5 – Weaver	Hinkle Fieldhouse (282); Indianapolis, IN
Nov 13, 2018*; 7:00 pm		Murray State	W 86–65	2–0	24 – Jennings	10 – Schickel	5 – Weaver	Hinkle Fieldhouse (484); Indianapolis, IN
Nov 17, 2018*; 2:00 pm		Western Illinois	W 92–51	3–0	17 – Schickel	10 – Brey	5 – Weaver	Hinkle Fieldhouse (479); Indianapolis, IN
Nov 20, 2018*; 12:00 pm		UMass Lowell	W 89–36	4–0	17 – Weaver	10 – Schickel	7 – Weaver	Hinkle Fieldhouse (461); Indianapolis, IN
Nov 25, 2018*; 2:00 pm		Illinois State	W 58–56	5–0	17 – Jennings	8 – Schickel	7 – Weaver	Hinkle Fieldhouse (611); Indianapolis, IN
Dec 2, 2018*; 2:00 pm		Ball State	W 64–47	6–0	20 – Jennings	12 – Schickel	8 – Schickel	Hinkle Fieldhouse (1,524); Indianapolis, IN
Dec 5, 2018*; 7:00 pm		at Indiana	L 46–66	6–1	13 – Tied	13 – Schickel	4 – Weaver	Simon Skjodt Assembly Hall (3,642); Bloomington, IN
Dec 8, 2018*; 2:00 pm, ESPN+		at Akron	W 63–47	7–1	20 – Spolyar	12 – Schickel	5 – Weaver	James A. Rhodes Arena (565); Akron, OH
Dec 17, 2018*; 7:00 pm		Indiana State	W 72–49	8–1	16 – Jennings	9 – Schickel	5 – Weaver	Hinkle Fieldhouse (789); Indianapolis, IN
Dec 20, 2018*; 12:15 pm		vs. Ohio State; West Palm Invitational	W 66–53	9–1	25 – Weaver	6 – Schickel	5 – Tied	Student Life Center (250); West Palm Beach, FL
Dec 21, 2018*; 1:00 pm		vs. Eastern Michigan; West Palm Invitational	W 73–63	10–1	15 – Tied	7 – Schickel	5 – Brey	Student Life Center (79); West Palm Beach, FL
Big East regular season
Dec 29, 2018; 8:00 pm, FS2		at Villanova	W 63–55	11–1 (1–0)	22 – Schickel	12 – Brey	4 – Weaver	Finneran Pavilion (641); Villanova, PA
Dec 31, 2018; 1:00 pm, BEDN		at Georgetown	W 59–50	12–1 (2–0)	23 – Jennings	12 – Brey	5 – Weaver	McDonough Gymnasium (345); Washington, D.C.
Jan 4, 2019; 7:00 pm, BEDN		Seton Hall	W 62–59	13–1 (3–0)	19 – Schickel	11 – Schickel	5 – Weaver	Hinkle Fieldhouse (781); Indianapolis, IN
Jan 6, 2019; 1:00 pm, FS2		St. John's	W 66–45	14–1 (4–0)	23 – Spolyar	6 – Spolyar	3 – Schickel	Hinkle Fieldhouse (858); Indianapolis, IN
Jan 11, 2019; 7:00 pm, BEDN		at Xavier	W 63–41	15–1 (5–0)	20 – Jennings	8 – Spolyar	7 – Weaver	Cintas Center (761); Cincinnati, OH
Jan 18, 2019; 11:30 am, BEDN		at Providence	L 68–74 ^{3OT}	15–2 (5–1)	25 – Jennings	10 – Schickel	2 – Tied	Alumni Hall (1,112); Providence, RI
Jan 20, 2019; 3:00 pm, FS1		at Creighton	W 75–43	16–2 (6–1)	23 – Strong	12 – Schickel	5 – Weaver	D. J. Sokol Arena (1,083); Omaha, NE
Jan 25, 2019; 7:00 pm, BEDN		DePaul	L 78–86	16–3 (6–2)	22 – Spolyar	10 – Schickel	6 – Jennings	Hinkle Fieldhouse (1,758); Indianapolis, IN
Jan 27, 2019; 2:00 pm, BEDN		No. 10 Marquette	L 58–87	16–4 (6–3)	13 – Spolyar	6 – Brey	4 – Weaver	Hinkle Fieldhouse (1,437); Indianapolis, IN
Feb 1, 2019; 7:00 pm, BEDN		at St. John's	W 73–68 ^{OT}	17–4 (7–3)	29 – Jennings	9 – Schickel	5 – Weaver	Carnesecca Arena (750); Queens, NY
Feb 3, 2019; 1:00 pm, BEDN		at Seton Hall	L 62–83	17–5 (7–4)	14 – Spolyar	10 – Schickel	5 – Weaver	Walsh Gymnasium (1,344); South Orange, NJ
Feb 8, 2019; 7:00 pm, BEDN		Xavier	W 63–38	18–5 (8–4)	18 – Spolyar	9 – Schickel	6 – Weaver	Hinkle Fieldhouse (1,124); Indianapolis, IN
Feb 15, 2019; 7:00 pm, BEDN		Creighton	W 66–46	19–5 (9–4)	13 – Spolyar	7 – Schickel	5 – Weaver	Hinkle Fieldhouse (882); Indianapolis, IN
Feb 17, 2019; 2:00 pm, BEDN		Providence	L 63–66 ^{OT}	19–6 (9–5)	23 – Jennings	19 – Schickel	3 – Tied	Hinkle Fieldhouse (1,618); Indianapolis, IN
Feb 22, 2019; 2:00 pm, BEDN		at No. 11 Marquette	W 61–57	20–6 (10–5)	19 – Schickel	10 – Brey	6 – Spolyar	Al McGuire Center (2,003); Milwaukee, WI
Feb 24, 2019; 7:00 pm, BEDN		at DePaul	L 62–76	20–7 (10–6)	14 – Schickel	8 – Schickel	6 – Weaver	Wintrust Arena (2,165); Chicago, IL
Mar 1, 2018; 7:00 pm, BEDN		Georgetown	L 42–72	20–8 (10–7)	9 – Tied	6 – Schickel	5 – Weaver	Hinkle Fieldhouse (935); Indianapolis, IN
Mar 3, 2019; 2:00 pm, BEDN		Villanova	W 62–60 ^{OT}	21–8 (11–7)	22 – Spolyar	9 – Schickel	3 – Tied	Hinkle Fieldhouse (1,012); Indianapolis, IN
Big East Women's Tournament
Mar 10, 2019; 9:30 pm, FS2	(3)	vs. (6) Creighton; Quarterfinals	L 51–60	21–9	16 – Schickel	9 – Brey	4 – Schickel	Wintrust Arena (2,164); Chicago, IL
WNIT
Mar 21, 2019*; 7:00 pm		Northeastern; First Round	W 89–72	22–9	29 – Jennings	10 – Schickel	9 – Schickel	Hinkle Fieldhouse (437); Indianapolis, IN
Mar 23, 2019*; 7:00 pm		Kent State; Second Round	W 70–52	23–9	23 – Jennings	11 – Schickel	4 – Weaver	Hinkle Fieldhouse (747); Indianapolis, IN
Mar 28, 2019*; 7:00 pm		at Cincinnati; Third Round	L 65–72	23–10	25 – Jennings	11 – Schickel	5 – Tied	Fifth Third Arena (2,450); Cincinnati, OH
*Non-conference game. ^{#}Rankings from AP Poll. (#) Tournament seedings in parentheses. All times are in Eastern.

== Rankings ==
2018–19 NCAA Division I women's basketball rankings

Regular season polls
Poll	Pre- Season	Week 2	Week 3	Week 4	Week 5	Week 6	Week 7	Week 8	Week 9	Week 10	Week 11	Week 12	Week 13	Week 14	Week 15	Week 16	Week 17	Week 18	Week 19	Final
AP	NR	NR	NR	NR	NR	NR	NR	NR	NR	RV	RV	NR	NR							N/A
Coaches	NR	NR	NR	NR	NR	NR	NR	NR	NR	RV	RV	RV	NR							

Legend
	Increase in ranking
	Decrease in ranking
	No change
(RV)	Received votes
(NR)	Not ranked

== See also ==
2018–19 Butler Bulldogs men's basketball team
