= 2018–19 Georgetown Hoyas women's basketball team =

Intercollegiate basketball season

2018–19 Georgetown Hoyas women's basketball

WNIT, Quarterfinals
- Conference: Big East
- Record: 19–16 (9–9 Big East)
- Head coach: James Howard (2nd season)
- Assistant coaches: Niki Reid Geckeler; Andre Bolton; Erin Dickerson
- Home arena: McDonough Gymnasium

2018–19 Big East Conference women's basketball standings
	Conf.				Overall
Team	W		L	PCT	W		L	PCT
No. 18 Marquette	15	–	3	.833	27	–	8	.771
No. 24 DePaul †	14	–	4	.778	26	–	8	.765
Butler	11	–	7	.611	23	–	10	.697
Villanova	9	–	9	.500	19	–	13	.594
Georgetown	9	–	9	.500	19	–	15	.559
Providence	8	–	10	.444	19	–	16	.543
Creighton	8	–	10	.444	15	–	16	.484
Seton Hall	7	–	11	.389	15	–	16	.484
St. John's	7	–	11	.389	15	–	16	.484
Xavier	2	–	16	.111	11	–	19	.367
† 2019 Big East tournament winner As of March 12, 2019; Rankings from AP poll

The 2018–19 Georgetown Hoyas women's basketball team represented Georgetown University in the 2018–19 college basketball season. The Hoyas, led by second year head coach James Howard and were members of the Big East Conference. The Hoyas played their home games at the McDonough Gymnasium. They finished the season 19–16, 9–9 in Big East play to finish in a tie for fourth place. They advanced to the semifinals of the Big East women's tournament, where they lost to Marquette. They received an at-large bid to the WNIT, where they defeated Sacred Heart, Harvard, Big East member Providence in the first, second and third rounds before losing to James Madison in the quarterfinals.

== Roster ==
2018–19 Georgetown Hoyas women's basketball team
Players
Coaches

Pos.	#	Name	Height	Year	Previous school	Hometown
G	0	Brianna Jones	5 ft 9 in (1.75 m)	RS Jr	North Babylon; Louisville	North Babylon, NY
F	1	Tatiana Thompson	6 ft 0 in (1.83 m)	So	Winter Haven	Winter Haven, FL
G	2	Cassandra Gordon	5 ft 10 in (1.78 m)	Fr	Santa Barbara	Santa Barbara, CA
G	3	Morgan Smith	6 ft 0 in (1.83 m)	Jr	Riverdale Baptist	Upper Marlboro, MD
G	4	Courtney Meadows	5 ft 5 in (1.65 m)	Fr	Concord First Assembly	Charlotte, NC
G	10	Lexi Kimball	5 ft 10 in (1.78 m)	So	Greens Farms Academy	Westport, CT
G	11	Dionna White	5 ft 5 in (1.65 m)	Sr	Milford Mill	Baltimore, MD
G	12	Marvellous Osagie-Erese	5 ft 4 in (1.63 m)	Jr	East Orange STEM Academy	East Orange, NJ
F	13	Anita Kelava	6 ft 3 in (1.91 m)	RS So	Croatian National Team; Maine	Zagreb, Croatia
G	15	Mikayla Venson	5 ft 7 in (1.7 m)	RS Sr	Yorktown; Virginia	Arlington, VA
C	21	Breonna Mayfield	6 ft 5 in (1.96 m)	So	Good Counsel	Clinton, MD
F/C	22	Shanniah Wright	6 ft 1 in (1.85 m)	Fr	Polytechnic Preparatory Day School	Brooklyn, NY
G	23	Tayanna Jones	6 ft 2 in (1.88 m)	Fr	North Johnston	Selma, NC
F	25	Sari Cureton	6 ft 1 in (1.85 m)	So	Walled Lake Western	Farmington, MI
G	31	Nikola Kovacikova	5 ft 11 in (1.8 m)	Fr	UKF Nitra	Levice, Slovakia
G	34	Dorothy Adomako	6 ft 1 in (1.85 m)	RS Sr	Cosby	Midlothian, VA

Head coach

- James Howard (Greensboro)

Assistant coach(es)

- Niki Reid Geckeler (Georgetown)
- Andre Bolton (Christopher Newport)
- Erin Dickerson (Northwestern)

Legend

- (C) Team captain
- (S) Suspended
- (I) Ineligible
- (W) Walk-on
- Injured
- Current redshirt

Roster

== Schedule ==
Date time, TV	Rank^{#}	Opponent^{#}	Result	Record	Site (attendance) city, state
Non-conference regular season
Nov 6, 2018*; 7:00 pm		at Richmond	W 73–53	1–0	Robins Center (1,006); Richmond, VA
Nov 9, 2018*; 7:00 pm		Maryland Eastern Shore	W 74–55	2–0	McDonough Gymnasium (547); Washington, D.C.
Nov 13, 2018*; 7:00 pm		Loyola (MD)	W 45–30	3–0	McDonough Gymnasium (163); Washington, D.C.
Nov 16, 2018*; 7:00 pm		at James Madison	L 57–69	3–1	JMU Convocation Center (1,927); Harrisonburg, VA
Nov 19, 2018*; 7:00 pm		Pittsburgh	W 70–41	4–1	McDonough Gymnasium (399); Washington, D.C.
Nov 23, 2018*; 8:00 pm		vs. Buffalo; South Point Thanksgiving Shootout	L 64–73	4–2	South Point Events Center; Enterprise, NV
Nov 24, 2018*; 10:30 pm		vs. Baylor; South Point Thanksgiving Shootout	L 46–67	4–3	South Point Events Center (477); Enterprise, NV
Nov 29, 2018*; 7:00 pm		Fordham	W 58–38	5–3	McDonough Gymnasium (217); Washington, D.C.
Dec 2, 2018*; 2:00 pm		VCU	L 45–47	5–4	McDonough Gymnasium (377); Washington, D.C.
Dec 10, 2018*; 1:00 pm		No. 10 NC State	L 65–76	5–5	McDonough Gymnasium (671); Washington, D.C.
Dec 21, 2018*; 7:00 pm		at Rider	W 79–49	6–5	Alumni Gymnasium (682); Lawrenceville, NJ
Big East regular season
Dec 29, 2018; 5:00 pm, BEDN		Xavier	W 68–61	7–5 (1–0)	McDonough Gymnasium (591); Washington, D.C.
Dec 31, 2018; 1:00 pm, BEDN		Butler	L 50–59	7–6 (1–1)	McDonough Gymnasium (345); Washington, D.C.
Jan 4, 2019; 7:00 pm, BEDN		at Providence	W 68–52	8–6 (2–1)	Alumni Hall (215); Providence, RI
Jan 6, 2019; 2:00 pm, CBSSN		at Creighton	L 38–65	8–7 (2–2)	D. J. Sokol Arena (1,056); Omaha, NE
Jan 11, 2019; 7:00 pm, BEDN		DePaul	L 64–69	8–8 (2–3)	McDonough Gymnasium (533); Washington, D.C.
Jan 13, 2019; 2:00 pm, BEDN		No. 15 Marquette	L 62–72	8–9 (2–4)	McDonough Gymnasium (203); Washington, D.C.
Jan 19, 2019; 2:00 pm, BEDN		Villanova	W 68–63	9–9 (3–4)	McDonough Gymnasium (1,297); Washington, D.C.
Jan 25, 2019; 7:00 pm, BEDN		at St. John's	L 51–59	9–10 (3–5)	Carnesecca Arena (772); Queens, NY
Jan 27, 2019; 1:00 pm, BEDN		at Seton Hall	L 63–76	9–11 (3–6)	Walsh Gymnasium (778); South Orange, NJ
Feb 1, 2019; 7:00 pm, BEDN		Creighton	W 62–53	10–11 (4–6)	McDonough Gymnasium (649); Washington, D.C.
Feb 3, 2019; 2:00 pm, BEDN		Providence	W 61–56	11–11 (5–6)	McDonough Gymnasium (815); Washington, D.C.
Feb 8, 2019; 8:00 pm, FS1		at No. 8 Marquette	L 52–59	11–12 (5–7)	Al McGuire Center (2,061); Milwaukee, WI
Feb 10, 2019; 3:00 pm, BEDN		at DePaul	L 71–76	11–13 (5–8)	McGrath-Phillips Arena (1,882); Chicago, IL
Feb 16, 2019; 2:00 pm, BEDN		at Villanova	L 43–91	11–14 (5–9)	Finneran Pavilion (1,301); Villanova, PA
Feb 22, 2019; 11:00 am, BEDN		Seton Hall	W 51–43	12–14 (6–9)	McDonough Gymnasium (513); Washington, D.C.
Feb 24, 2019; 2:00 pm, FS2		St. John's	W 82–80	13–14 (7–9)	McDonough Gymnasium (987); Washington, D.C.
Mar 1, 2019; 7:00 pm, BEDN		at Butler	W 72–42	14–14 (8–9)	Hinkle Fieldhouse (935); Indianapolis, IN
Mar 3, 2019; 2:00 pm, BEDN		at Xavier	W 67–64	15–14 (9–9)	Cintas Center (583); Cincinnati, OH
Big East Women's Tournament
Mar 10, 2019; 3:30 pm, FS2	(4)	vs. (5) Villanova; Quarterfinals	W 76–67	16–14	Wintrust Arena; Chicago, IL
Mar 11, 2019; 4:00 pm, FS1	(4)	vs. (1) No. 17 Marquette; Semifinals	L 62–75	16–15	Wintrust Arena; Chicago, IL
WNIT
Mar 22, 2019*; 7:00 pm		Sacred Heart; First Round	W 90–59	17–15	McDonough Gymnasium (345); Washington, D.C.
Mar 24, 2019*; 3:00 pm		at Harvard; Second Round	W 70–65	18–15	Lavietes Pavilion (322); Cambridge, MA
Mar 26, 2019*; 7:00 pm, BEDN		at Providence; Third Round	W 53–46	19–15	Alumni Hall; Providence, RI
Mar 31, 2019*; 2:00 pm		at James Madison; Quarterfinals	L 44–54	19–16	JMU Convocation Center (2,074); Harrisonburg, VA
*Non-conference game. ^{#}Rankings from AP Poll. (#) Tournament seedings in parentheses. All times are in Eastern.

== Rankings ==
2018–19 NCAA Division I women's basketball rankings

Regular season polls
Poll	Pre- Season	Week 2	Week 3	Week 4	Week 5	Week 6	Week 7	Week 8	Week 9	Week 10	Week 11	Week 12	Week 13	Week 14	Week 15	Week 16	Week 17	Week 18	Week 19	Final
AP																				N/A
Coaches																				

Legend
	Increase in ranking
	Decrease in ranking
	No change
(RV)	Received votes
(NR)	Not ranked

== See also ==
- 2018–19 Georgetown Hoyas men's basketball team
