= 2018–19 Providence Friars women's basketball team =

Intercollegiate basketball season

2018–19 Providence Friars women's basketball
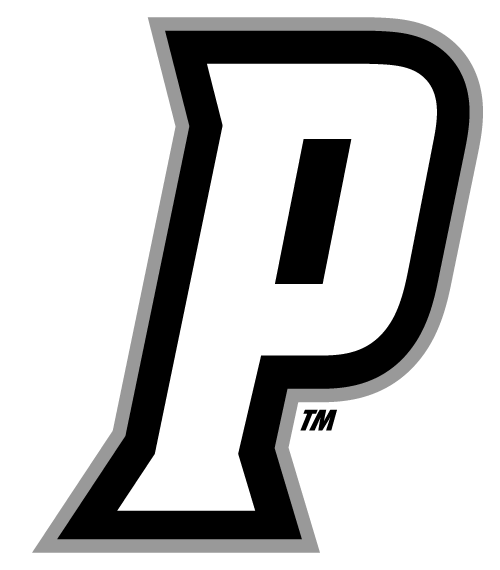

WNIT, Third Round
- Conference: Big East
- Record: 19–16 (8–10 Big East)
- Head coach: Jim Crowley (3rd season)
- Assistant coaches: Priscilla Edwards; Tiara Johnson; Jessica Jenkins
- Home arena: Alumni Hall

2018–19 Big East Conference women's basketball standings
	Conf.				Overall
Team	W		L	PCT	W		L	PCT
No. 18 Marquette	15	–	3	.833	27	–	8	.771
No. 24 DePaul †	14	–	4	.778	26	–	8	.765
Butler	11	–	7	.611	23	–	10	.697
Villanova	9	–	9	.500	19	–	13	.594
Georgetown	9	–	9	.500	19	–	15	.559
Providence	8	–	10	.444	19	–	16	.543
Creighton	8	–	10	.444	15	–	16	.484
Seton Hall	7	–	11	.389	15	–	16	.484
St. John's	7	–	11	.389	15	–	16	.484
Xavier	2	–	16	.111	11	–	19	.367
† 2019 Big East tournament winner As of March 12, 2019; Rankings from AP poll

The 2018–19 Providence Friars women's basketball team represented Providence College in the 2018–19 NCAA Division I women's basketball season. The Friars, led by third year head coach Jim Crowley, played their home games at Alumni Hall and were members of the Big East Conference. They finished the season 19–16, 8–10 in Big East play to finish in a tie for sixth place. They advanced to the quarterfinals of the Big East women's tournament where they lost to DePaul. They received an at-large bid to the WNIT where they defeated Hartford and Penn in the first and second rounds before losing to Big East member Georgetown in the third round.

== Roster ==
2018–19 Providence Friars women's basketball team
Players
Coaches

Pos.	#	Name	Height	Year	Previous school	Hometown
G	0	Kaela Webb	5 ft 4 in (1.63 m)	Fr	Detroit Country Day	Pontiac, MI
G	1	Earlette Scott	5 ft 10 in (1.78 m)	Fr	South Shore	Brooklyn, NY
G	2	Chanell Williams	5 ft 4 in (1.63 m)	So	Monsignor Scanlan	Bronx, NY
F	4	Sophia Widmeyer	5 ft 10 in (1.78 m)	Fr	Marianapolis Prep	Dartmouth, NS
G	5	Kyra Spiwak	5 ft 9 in (1.75 m)	So	Rolling Meadows	Arlington Heights, IL
F	10	Mary Baskerville	6 ft 3 in (1.91 m)	Fr	Enfield	Enfield, CT
G	11	Jovana Nogic	6 ft 1 in (1.85 m)	Sr	Vergilio Ferreira	Belgrade, Serbia
G	12	Maya Klein	5 ft 5 in (1.65 m)	Fr	St. Luke's School	Stamford, CT
G	21	Maddie Jolin	5 ft 9 in (1.75 m)	Sr	Bishop Feehan	Rehoboth, MA
G	22	Olivia Orlando	5 ft 10 in (1.78 m)	So	Tilton School	Winthrop, MA
G	23	Clara Che	5 ft 8 in (1.73 m)	Sr	Institut Joaquim Blume	Valencia, Spain
F	32	Alyssa Geary	6 ft 4 in (1.93 m)	Fr	Nazareth Academy	Elmhurst, IL
F	33	Andrea Cooper	5 ft 10 in (1.78 m)	So	Edmond Santa Fe	Edmond, OK

Head coach

- Jim Crowley (Keuka)

Assistant coach(es)

- Priscilla Edwards (St. Bonaventure)
- Tiara Johnson (St. Bonaventure)
- Jessica Jenkins (St. Bonaventure)

Legend

- (C) Team captain
- (S) Suspended
- (I) Ineligible
- (W) Walk-on
- Injured
- Current redshirt

Roster

== Schedule ==
Date time, TV	Rank^{#}	Opponent^{#}	Result	Record	Site (attendance) city, state
Exhibition
Nov 3, 2018*; 1:00 pm		Assumption College	W 71–51		Alumni Hall; Providence, RI
Non-conference regular season
Nov 8, 2018*; 7:00 pm		at Penn State	L 72–74	0–1	Bryce Jordan Center (2,115); University Park, PA
Nov 15, 2018*; 7:00 pm		Quinnipiac	L 44–48	0–2	Alumni Hall (342); Providence, RI
Nov 21, 2018*; 12:00 pm		Sacred Heart	W 62–52	1–2	Alumni Hall (130); Providence, RI
Nov 27, 2018*; 7:00 pm		at Boston College	W 61–57	2–2	Conte Forum (722); Chestnut Hill, MA
Nov 29, 2018*; 7:00 pm		Yale	W 59–42	3–2	Alumni Hall (356); Providence, RI
Dec 1, 2018*; 12:00 pm		at Rhode Island; Ocean State Tip-Off Tournament semifinals	L 65–72	3–3	Ryan Center (426); Kingston, RI
Dec 2, 2018*; 12:00 pm		vs. Bryant; Ocean State Tip-Off Tournament 3rd place game	W 72–64	4–3	Ryan Center (420); Kingston, RI
Dec 8, 2018*; 1:00 pm		at UMass Lowell	W 71–47	5–3	Costello Athletic Center (322); Lowell, MA
Dec 15, 2018*; 1:00 pm		Northeastern	L 59–65	5–4	Alumni Hall (282); Providence, RI
Dec 19, 2018*; 4:30 pm		Pepperdine; Friar Holiday Classic	W 66–47	6–4	Alumni Hall (231); Providence, RI
Dec 20, 2018*; 4:30 pm		Northern Kentucky; Friar Holiday Classic	W 48–43	7–4	Alumni Hall (217); Providence, RI
Dec 21, 2018*; 2:30 pm		La Salle; Friar Holiday Classic	W 77–47	8–4	Alumni Hall (176); Providence, RI
Big East regular season
Dec 29, 2018; 3:00 pm, BEDN		at No. 22 Marquette	L 46–85	8–5 (0–1)	Al McGuire Center (1,826); Milwaukee, WI
Dec 31, 2018; 3:00 pm, BEDN		at No. 24 DePaul	L 62–88	8–6 (0–2)	McGrath-Phillips Arena (1,690); Chicago, IL
Jan 4, 2019; 7:00 pm, BEDN		Georgetown	L 52–68	8–7 (0–3)	Alumni Hall (215); Providence, RI
Jan 6, 2019; 1:00 pm, BEDN		Villanova	W 67–61	9–7 (1–3)	Alumni Hall (512); Providence, RI
Jan 11, 2019; 11:00 am, BEDN		at St. John's	W 67–66 ^{OT}	10–7 (2–3)	Carnesecca Arena (5,602); Queens, NY
Jan 13, 2019; 1:00 pm, FS2		at Seton Hall	L 73–79	10–8 (2–4)	Walsh Gymnasium (902); South Orange, NJ
Jan 18, 2019; 11:30 am, BEDN		Butler	W 74–68 ^{3OT}	11–8 (3–4)	Alumni Hall (1,112); Providence, RI
Jan 20, 2019; 1:00 pm, BEDN		Xavier	W 71–58	12–8 (4–4)	Alumni Hall (302); Providence, RI
Jan 26, 2019; 2:00 pm, BEDN		at Creighton	W 77–63	13–8 (5–4)	D. J. Sokol Arena (816); Omaha, NE
Feb 1, 2019; 7:00 pm, BEDN		at Villanova	L 33–53	13–9 (5–5)	Finneran Pavilion (601); Villanova, PA
Feb 3, 2019; 2:00 pm, BEDN		at Georgetown	L 56–61	13–10 (5–6)	McDonough Gymnasium (815); Washington, D.C.
Feb 8, 2019; 7:00 pm, BEDN		Seton Hall	W 82–75	14–10 (6–6)	Alumni Hall (341); Providence, RI
Feb 10, 2019; 1:00 pm, BEDN		St. John's	L 57–60	14–11 (6–7)	Alumni Hall (487); Providence, RI
Feb 15, 2019; 7:00 pm, FS2		at Xavier	W 63–55	15–11 (7–7)	Cintas Center (1,185); Cincinnati, OH
Feb 17, 2019; 2:00 pm, BEDN		at Butler	W 66–63 ^{OT}	16–11 (8–7)	Hinkle Fieldhouse (1,618); Indianapolis, IN
Feb 23, 2019; 4:00 pm, BEDN		Creighton	L 64–73	16–12 (8–8)	Alumni Hall (486); Providence, RI
Mar 1, 2019; 7:00 pm, BEDN		DePaul	L 61–76	16–13 (8–9)	Alumni Hall (333); Providence, RI
Mar 3, 2019; 1:00 pm, BEDN		No. 13 Marquette	L 57–80	16–14 (8–10)	Alumni Hall (578); Providence, RI
Big East Women's Tournament
Mar 9, 2019; 5:30 pm, BEDN	(7)	vs. (10) Xavier; First Round	W 70–62	17–14	Wintrust Arena; Chicago, IL
Mar 10, 2019; 7:00 pm, FS2	(7)	vs. (2) DePaul; Quarterfinals	L 60–85	17–15	Wintrust Arena; Chicago, IL
WNIT
Mar 21, 2019*; 7:00 pm		Hartford; First Round	W 71–54	18–15	Alumni Hall (368); Providence, RI
Mar 24, 2019*; 4:00 pm		Penn; Second Round	W 64–54	19–15	Alumni Hall (511); Providence, RI
Mar 26, 2019*; 7:00 pm, BEDN		Georgetown; Third Round	L 46–53	19–16	Alumni Hall; Providence, RI
*Non-conference game. ^{#}Rankings from AP Poll. (#) Tournament seedings in parentheses. All times are in Eastern.

== See also ==
- 2018–19 Providence Friars men's basketball team
