= 2018–19 Seton Hall Pirates women's basketball team =

Intercollegiate basketball season

2018–19 Seton Hall Pirates women's basketball

WNIT, First Round
- Conference: Big East Conference
- Record: 15–16 (7–11 Big East)
- Head coach: Anthony Bozzella (6th season)
- Assistant coaches: Lauren DeFalco; Marissa Flagg; Nick DiPillo
- Home arena: Walsh Gymnasium

2018–19 Big East Conference women's basketball standings
	Conf.				Overall
Team	W		L	PCT	W		L	PCT
No. 18 Marquette	15	–	3	.833	27	–	8	.771
No. 24 DePaul †	14	–	4	.778	26	–	8	.765
Butler	11	–	7	.611	23	–	10	.697
Villanova	9	–	9	.500	19	–	13	.594
Georgetown	9	–	9	.500	19	–	15	.559
Providence	8	–	10	.444	19	–	16	.543
Creighton	8	–	10	.444	15	–	16	.484
Seton Hall	7	–	11	.389	15	–	16	.484
St. John's	7	–	11	.389	15	–	16	.484
Xavier	2	–	16	.111	11	–	19	.367
† 2019 Big East tournament winner As of March 12, 2019; Rankings from AP poll

The 2018–19 Seton Hall Pirates women's basketball team represented Seton Hall University during the 2018–19 NCAA Division I women's basketball season. The Pirates, led by sixth year head coach Anthony Bozzella, played their home games in South Orange, New Jersey at the Walsh Gymnasium as members of the Big East Conference. They finished the season 15–16, 7–11 in Big East play to finish in a tie for eighth place. They lost in the first round of the Big East women's tournament to St. John's. They received an at-large bid to the WNIT where they lost to Toledo in the first round.

== Roster ==
2018–19 Seton Hall Pirates women's basketball team
Players
Coaches

Pos.	#	Name	Height	Year	Previous school	Hometown
G	1	Kaela Hilaire	5 ft 2 in (1.57 m)	Jr	Floral Park	Floral Park, NY
G	2	Danielle Robinson	5 ft 11 in (1.8 m)	Fr	University	Newark, NJ
G	3	Victoria Cardaci	5 ft 5 in (1.65 m)	RS Sr	Holmdel; Clemson	Holmdel, NJ
G	4	Kaity Healy (C)	5 ft 6 in (1.68 m)	RS Jr	Colts Neck	Colts Neck, NJ
G	5	Inja Butina	5 ft 9 in (1.75 m)	Sr	Gimnazija Zagreb; Hutchinson CC	Zagreb, Croatia
G/F	10	Alexis Lewis (redshirt)	5 ft 10 in (1.78 m)	Sr	Holy Redeemer; Iona	Pittston, PA
G	12	Barbara Johnson	5 ft 8 in (1.73 m)	Sr	The Rock School; Ole Miss	Toronto, ON
G	13	Diandra DaRosa	5 ft 6 in (1.68 m)	RS Sr	William E. Tolman; Virginia Tech	Pawtucket, RI
F	15	Femi Funeus	6 ft 2 in (1.88 m)	Fr	American Heritage	Plantation, FL
C	20	Kimi Evans	6 ft 4 in (1.93 m)	So	St. John Vianney	Jackson, NJ
G	21	Nicole Jimenez	5 ft 1 in (1.55 m)	Sr	Florida Christian; Broward College	Miami, FL
F/C	22	Whitney Howell	6 ft 1 in (1.85 m)	Fr	Santaluces	Lake Worth, FL
G/F	24	Shadeen Samuels	6 ft 0 in (1.83 m)	Jr	Ossining	Ossining, NY
G	25	Desiree Elmore	5 ft 9 in (1.75 m)	RS So	Capital Prep; Syracuse	Hartford, CT
F	31	Alexia Allesch (redshirt)	6 ft 1 in (1.85 m)	So	Gill St. Bernard's; Massachusetts	Basking Ridge, NJ
F	34	Selena Philoxy	6 ft 1 in (1.85 m)	So	South Shore	Queens, NY

Head coach

- Anthony Bozzella (Seton Hall)

Assistant coach(es)

- Lauren DeFalco (Iona)
- Marissa Flagg (Iona)
- Nick DiPillo (Fairleigh Dickinson)

Legend

- (C) Team captain
- (S) Suspended
- (I) Ineligible
- (W) Walk-on
- Injured
- Current redshirt

Roster

== Schedule ==
Date time, TV	Rank^{#}	Opponent^{#}	Result	Record	Site (attendance) city, state
Exhibition
Nov 1, 2018*; 7:00 pm		Jefferson	W 95–81		Walsh Gymnasium (398); South Orange, NJ
Non-conference regular season
Nov 6, 2018*; 2:00 pm, PSN		Wagner	W 95–40	1–0	Walsh Gymnasium (660); South Orange, NJ
Nov 10, 2018*; 12:00 pm, PSN		Kennesaw State; Seton Hall Tip-Off	W 102–80	2–0	Walsh Gymnasium (707); South Orange, NJ
Nov 11, 2018*; 1:00 pm, PSN		UTSA; Seton Hall Tip-Off	W 84–53	3–0	Walsh Gymnasium (487); South Orange, NJ
Nov 14, 2018*; 6:00 pm, ESPN+		at Princeton	W 70–66	4–0	Walsh Gymnasium (715); South Orange, NJ
Nov 18, 2018*; 5:00 pm		at UCLA	L 62–78	4–1	Pauley Pavilion (2,157); Los Angeles, CA
Nov 25, 2018*; 1:00 pm, PSN		St. Francis Brooklyn	W 100–77	5–1	Walsh Gymnasium (658); South Orange, NJ
Nov 27, 2018*; 7:00 pm, PSN		UMass Lowell	W 90–57	6–1	Walsh Gymnasium (651); South Orange, NJ
Dec 2, 2018*; 1:00 pm, PSN		Saint Peter's	W 90–47	7–1	Walsh Gymnasium (661); South Orange, NJ
Dec 8, 2018*; 1:00 pm, SNY/ESPN3		at No. 1 Connecticut	L 61–99	7–2	XL Center (9,536); Hartford, CT
Dec 20, 2018*; 12:30 pm		vs. Georgia Tech; West Palm Invitational	L 73–84	7–3	Student Life Center (123); West Palm Beach, FL
Dec 21, 2018*; 7:00 pm		vs. UNC Greensboro; West Palm Invitational	W 71–64	8–3	Student Life Center (203); West Palm Beach, FL
Big East regular season
Dec 30, 2018; 1:00 pm, BEDN		St. John's	W 77–67	9–3 (1–0)	Walsh Gymnasium (864); South Orange, NJ
Jan 4, 2019; 7:00 pm, BEDN		at Butler	L 59–62	9–4 (1–1)	Hinkle Fieldhouse (781); Indianapolis, IN
Jan 6, 2019; 2:00 pm, BEDN		at Xavier	L 62–63 ^{OT}	9–5 (1–2)	Cintas Center (576); Cincinnati, OH
Jan 11, 2019; 11:00 am, BEDN		Creighton	W 82–75	10–5 (2–2)	Walsh Gymnasium (1,473); South Orange, NJ
Jan 13, 2019; 1:00 pm, FS2		Providence	W 79–73	11–5 (3–2)	Walsh Gymnasium (902); South Orange, NJ
Jan 18, 2019; 12:30 pm, BEDN		at No. 14 Marquette	L 60–96	11–6 (3–3)	Al McGuire Center (3,700); Milwaukee, WI
Jan 20, 2019; 3:00 pm, BEDN		at No. 24 DePaul	W 84–73	12–6 (4–3)	McGrath-Phillips Arena (1,571); Chicago, IL
Jan 25, 2019; 7:00 pm, BEDN		Villanova	L 66–70	12–7 (4–4)	Walsh Gymnasium (902); South Orange, NJ
Jan 27, 2019; 1:00 pm, BEDN		Georgetown	W 76–63	13–7 (5–4)	Walsh Gymnasium (778); South Orange, NJ
Feb 1, 2019; 7:00 pm, BEDN		Xavier	L 76–80	13–8 (5–5)	Walsh Gymnasium (826); South Orange, NJ
Feb 3, 2019; 1:00 pm, BEDN		Butler	W 83–62	14–8 (6–5)	Walsh Gymnasium (1,344); South Orange, NJ
Feb 8, 2019; 7:00 pm, BEDN		at Providence	L 75–82	14–9 (6–6)	Alumni Hall (341); Providence, RI
Feb 10, 2019; 2:00 pm, FS2		at Creighton	L 71–80	14–10 (6–7)	D. J. Sokol Arena (1,060); Omaha, NE
Feb 15, 2019; 7:00 pm, BEDN		DePaul	L 85–94	14–11 (6–8)	Walsh Gymnasium (782); South Orange, NJ
Feb 17, 2019; 12:00 pm, CBSSN		No. 8 Marquette	L 63–108	14–12 (6–9)	Walsh Gymnasium (924); South Orange, NJ
Feb 22, 2019; 11:30 am, BEDN		at Georgetown	L 43–51	14–13 (6–10)	McDonough Gymnasium (513); Washington, D.C.
Feb 24, 2019; 1:00 pm, BEDN		at Villanova	L 68–73	14–14 (6–11)	Finneran Pavilion (1,001); Villanova, PA
Mar 3, 2018; 2:00 pm, BEDN		at St. John's	W 76–72	15–14 (7–11)	Carnesecca Arena (1,126); Queens, NY
Big East Women's Tournament
Mar 9, 2019; 3:00 pm, BEDN	(8)	vs. (9) St. John's; First Round	L 51–76	15–15	Wintrust Arena; Chicago, IL
WNIT
Mar 21, 2019*; 7:00 pm, ESPN3		at Toledo; First Round	L 65–71	15–16	Savage Arena (1,289); Toledo, OH
*Non-conference game. ^{#}Rankings from AP Poll. (#) Tournament seedings in parentheses. All times are in Eastern Time.

== See also ==
- 2018–19 Seton Hall Pirates men's basketball team
