= 2018–19 St. John's Red Storm women's basketball team =

Intercollegiate basketball season

2018–19 St. John's Red Storm women's basketball
- Conference: Big East Conference
- Record: 15–16 (7–11 Big East)
- Head coach: Joe Tartamella (7th season)
- Assistant coaches: Jonath Nicholas; Rory Kuhn; Shenneika Smith
- Home arena: Carnesecca Arena; Madison Square Garden

2018–19 Big East Conference women's basketball standings
	Conf.				Overall
Team	W		L	PCT	W		L	PCT
No. 18 Marquette	15	–	3	.833	27	–	8	.771
No. 24 DePaul †	14	–	4	.778	26	–	8	.765
Butler	11	–	7	.611	23	–	10	.697
Villanova	9	–	9	.500	19	–	13	.594
Georgetown	9	–	9	.500	19	–	15	.559
Providence	8	–	10	.444	19	–	16	.543
Creighton	8	–	10	.444	15	–	16	.484
Seton Hall	7	–	11	.389	15	–	16	.484
St. John's	7	–	11	.389	15	–	16	.484
Xavier	2	–	16	.111	11	–	19	.367
† 2019 Big East tournament winner As of March 12, 2019; Rankings from AP poll

The 2018–19 St. John's Red Storm women's basketball team represented St. John's University during the 2018–19 NCAA Division I women's basketball season. The Red Storm, led by seventh-year head coach Joe Tartamella, played their games at Carnesecca Arena with 1 game at Madison Square Garden and were members of the Big East Conference. They finished the season 15–16, 7–11 in Big East play to finish in a tie for eighth place. They advanced to the quarterfinals of the Big East women's basketball tournament to Creighton where they lost to Marquette.

== Roster ==
2018–19 St. John's Red Storm women's basketball team
Players
Coaches

Pos.	#	Name	Height	Year	Previous school	Hometown
G	0	Alisha Kebbe	5 ft 10 in (1.78 m)	Jr	Neumann-Goretti	Philadelphia, PA
G	3	Tiana England	5 ft 7 in (1.7 m)	RS So	Stamford	Stamford, CT
G	5	Shamachya Duncan	5 ft 6 in (1.68 m)	Jr	The Patrick School	Staten Island, NY
G	10	Jasmine Sina	5 ft 5 in (1.65 m)	RS Sr	Gill-St. Bernards; Binghamton	Lake Hopatcong, NJ
F	11	Kayla Charles	6 ft 3 in (1.91 m)	So	William Cullen Bryant	Far Rockaway, NY
G/F	20	Akina Wellere	5 ft 11 in (1.8 m)	Sr	Gwendolyn Brooks College Prep	Chicago, IL
G	21	Qadashah Hoppie	5 ft 7 in (1.7 m)	So	The Patrick School	Staten Island, NY
G	22	Alissa Alston (redshirt)	5 ft 8 in (1.73 m)	Sr	Upper Room Christian Academy; Ole Miss	New Haven, CT
F	25	Curteeona Brelove	6 ft 2 in (1.88 m)	RS Sr	Malone; VCU	Malone, FL
G	30	Kadaja Bailey	6 ft 0 in (1.83 m)	Fr	St. Mary's	Long Beach, NY

Head coach

- Joe Tartamella (James Madison)

Assistant coach(es)

- Jonath Nicholas (Trinity (TX))
- Rory Kuhn (SUNY Cortland)
- Shenneika Smith (St. John's)

Legend

- (C) Team captain
- (S) Suspended
- (I) Ineligible
- (W) Walk-on
- Injured
- Current redshirt

Roster

== Schedule ==
Date time, TV	Rank^{#}	Opponent^{#}	Result	Record	Site (attendance) city, state
Non-conference regular season
Nov 9, 2018*; 5:30 pm, ESPN3		at Iona	W 61–35	1–0	Hynes Athletic Center (2,012); New Rochelle, NY
Nov 16, 2018*; 5:00 pm		at Army	W 60–49	2–0	Christl Arena (640); West Point, NY
Nov 22, 2018*; 5:30 pm		vs. Purdue; Paradise Jam Tournament Reef Division	W 68–62	3–0	Sports and Fitness Center (2,162); Saint Thomas, USVI
Nov 23, 2018*; 7:30 pm		vs. No. 2 Connecticut; Paradise Jam Tournament Reef Division	L 55–65	3–1	Sports and Fitness Center (2,373); Saint Thomas, USVI
Nov 24, 2018*; 5:30 pm		vs. Ole Miss; Paradise Jam Tournament Reef Division	W 64–59	4–1	Sports and Fitness Center (2,703); Saint Thomas, USVI
Nov 29, 2018*; 7:00 pm, ESPN3		Delaware State	W 82–44	5–1	Carnesecca Arena (726); Queens, NY
Dec 2, 2018*; 1:00 pm		at Wake Forest	L 59–64	5–2	LJVM Coliseum (320); Winston-Salem, NC
Dec 6, 2018*; 7:00 pm, ESPN3		Yale	W 56–52	6–2	Carnesecca Arena (704); Queens, NY
Dec 9, 2018*; 2:00 pm, ESPN3		Florida State	L 53–57	6–3	Carnesecca Arena (893); Queens, NY
Dec 15, 2018*; 2:00 pm, ESPN+		at La Salle	W 83–57	7–3	Tom Gola Arena (427); Philadelphia, PA
Dec 21, 2018*; 2:00 pm		at James Madison	L 51–64	7–4	JMU Convocation Center (2,154); Harrisonburg, VA
Big East regular season
Dec 30, 2018; 1:00 pm, BEDN		at Seton Hall	L 67–77	7–5 (0–1)	Walsh Gymnasium (864); South Orange, NJ
Jan 4, 2019; 7:00 pm, BEDN		at Xavier	W 76–57	8–5 (1–1)	Cintas Center (317); Cincinnati, OH
Jan 6, 2019; 1:00 pm, FS2		at Butler	L 45–66	8–6 (1–2)	Hinkle Fieldhouse (858); Indianapolis, IN
Jan 11, 2019; 11:00 am, BEDN		Providence	L 66–67 ^{OT}	8–7 (1–3)	Carnesecca Arena (5,602); Queens, NY
Jan 13, 2019; 2:00 pm, BEDN		Creighton	L 63–65	8–8 (1–4)	Carnesecca Arena (602); Queens, NY
Jan 18, 2019; 8:00 pm, BEDN		at No. 24 DePaul	L 64–73	8–9 (1–5)	McGrath-Phillips Arena (1,751); Chicago, IL
Jan 20, 2019; 3:00 pm, BEDN		at No. 14 Marquette	L 73–83	8–10 (1–6)	Al McGuire Center (1,451); Milwaukee, WI
Jan 25, 2019; 7:00 pm, BEDN		Georgetown	W 59–51	9–10 (2–6)	Carnesecca Arena (772); Queens, NY
Jan 27, 2019; 2:00 pm, BEDN		Villanova	L 57–73	9–11 (2–7)	Carnesecca Arena (754); Queens, NY
Feb 1, 2019; 7:00 pm, BEDN		Butler	L 68–73 ^{OT}	9–12 (2–8)	Carnesecca Arena (750); Queens, NY
Feb 3, 2019; 2:00 pm, BEDN		Xavier	W 70–41	10–12 (3–8)	Carnesecca Arena (599); Queens, NY
Feb 8, 2019; 8:00 pm, BEDN		at Creighton	W 51–45	11–12 (4–8)	D. J. Sokol Arena (848); Omaha, NE
Feb 10, 2019; 1:00 pm, BEDN		at Providence	W 60–57	12–12 (5–8)	Alumni Hall (487); Providence, RI
Feb 17, 2019; 7:00 pm, BEDN		No. 8 Marquette	W 81–74	13–12 (6–8)	Carnesecca Arena (753); Queens, NY
Feb 19, 2019; 1:00 pm, FS2		DePaul	L 62–70	13–13 (6–9)	Madison Square Garden (19,812); New York, NY
Feb 22, 2019; 7:00 pm, BEDN		at Villanova	W 66–62	14–13 (7–9)	Finneran Pavilion (651); Villanova, PA
Feb 24, 2019; 2:00 pm, FS2		at Georgetown	L 80–82	14–14 (7–10)	McDonough Gymnasium (987); Washington, D.C.
Mar 3, 2019; 2:00 pm, BEDN		Seton Hall	L 72–76	14–15 (7–11)	Carnesecca Arena (1,126); Queens, NY
Big East Women's Tournament
Mar 9, 2019; 3:30 pm, BEDN	(9)	vs. (8) Seton Hall; First Round	W 76–51	15–15	Wintrust Arena; Chicago, IL
Mar 10, 2019; 12:00 pm, FS2	(9)	vs. (1) No. 17 Marquette; Quarterfinals	L 57–88	15–16	Wintrust Arena; Chicago, IL
*Non-conference game. ^{#}Rankings from AP Poll. (#) Tournament seedings in parentheses. All times are in Eastern Time.

== See also ==
- 2018–19 St. John's Red Storm men's basketball team
