= 2018–19 DePaul Blue Demons women's basketball team =

Intercollegiate basketball season

2018–19 DePaul Blue Demons women's basketball
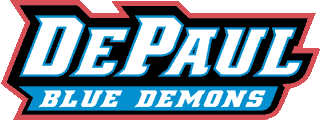

Big East Conference Tournament Champions

NCAA tournament, first round
- Conference: Big East Conference

Ranking
- Coaches: No. 25
- AP: No. 24
- Record: 26–8 (14–4 Big East)
- Head coach: Doug Bruno (33rd season)
- Assistant coaches: Jill M. Pizzotti; Lisa Ryckbosch; Jasmine Lister
- Home arena: Wintrust Arena; McGrath-Phillips Arena

2018–19 Big East Conference women's basketball standings
	Conf.				Overall
Team	W		L	PCT	W		L	PCT
No. 18 Marquette	15	–	3	.833	27	–	8	.771
No. 24 DePaul †	14	–	4	.778	26	–	8	.765
Butler	11	–	7	.611	23	–	10	.697
Villanova	9	–	9	.500	19	–	13	.594
Georgetown	9	–	9	.500	19	–	15	.559
Providence	8	–	10	.444	19	–	16	.543
Creighton	8	–	10	.444	15	–	16	.484
Seton Hall	7	–	11	.389	15	–	16	.484
St. John's	7	–	11	.389	15	–	16	.484
Xavier	2	–	16	.111	11	–	19	.367
† 2019 Big East tournament winner As of March 12, 2019; Rankings from AP poll

The 2018–18 DePaul Blue Demons women's basketball team represented DePaul University during the 2018–19 NCAA Division I women's basketball season. The Blue Demons, led by thirty-third year head coach Doug Bruno, played their home games at the Wintrust Arena as members of the Big East Conference. They finished the season 26–8, 14–4 in Big East play to finish in second place. DePaul won the Big East Conference tournament championship game over Marquette, 74–73. They were upset in the first round by Missouri State in the NCAA women's tournament.

== Previous season ==
The Blue Demons finished the 2017–18 season 27–8, 15–3 in Big East play to share the Big East regular season title with Marquette. They won the Big East women's tournament by defeating Marquette in the championship game. They received an automatic bid to the NCAA women's tournament where they defeated Oklahoma in the first round before losing to Texas A&M in the second round.

== Roster ==
2018–19 DePaul Blue Demons women's basketball team
Players
Coaches

Pos.	#	Name	Height	Year	Previous school	Hometown
G	0	Rebekah Dahlman	5 ft 9 in (1.75 m)	RS Sr	Braham Area; Vanderbilt	Braham, MN
G	1	Ashton Millender	5 ft 8 in (1.73 m)	Sr	Marian Catholic	Glenwood, IL
G	2	Maya Stovall	5 ft 7 in (1.7 m)	Fr	Parkway North	St. Louis, MO
G	10	Lexi Held	5 ft 10 in (1.78 m)	Fr	Cooper	Burlington, KY
G	11	Sonya Morris	5 ft 10 in (1.78 m)	Fr	Incarnate Word	St. Charles, MO
G	13	Courtney Krol	5 ft 11 in (1.8 m)	Fr	Chesterton	Chesterton, IN
G	15	Jolene Daninger	5 ft 7 in (1.7 m)	RS Fr	Andover	Andover, MN
G	20	Kelly Campbell	5 ft 10 in (1.78 m)	Jr	Saint John Vianney	Wall, NJ
F	22	Chante Stonewall	6 ft 1 in (1.85 m)	Jr	University	Normal, IL
G	23	Dee Bekelja	5 ft 8 in (1.73 m)	So	Solon	Solon, OH
G	24	Tanita Allen	5 ft 10 in (1.78 m)	Sr	Whitney Young	Chicago, IL
F	32	Dege Jean	6 ft 2 in (1.88 m)	Fr	Rich South	Richton Park, IL
F	35	Mart'e Grays	6 ft 2 in (1.88 m)	Sr	Martin Luther King Jr.	Detroit, MI

Head coach

- Doug Bruno (DePaul)

Assistant coach(es)

- Jill M. Pizzotti (Southeast Missouri State)
- Lisa Ryckbosch (Georgetown)
- Candis Blankson (DePaul)

Legend

- (C) Team captain
- (S) Suspended
- (I) Ineligible
- (W) Walk-on
- Injured
- Current redshirt

Roster

== Schedule ==
Date time, TV	Rank^{#}	Opponent^{#}	Result	Record	Site (attendance) city, state
Exhibition
Nov 5, 2018*; 7:00 pm	No. 15	Saint Xavier	W 140–62		McGrath-Phillips Arena (1,458); Chicago, IL
Non-conference regular season
Nov 9, 2018*; 7:00 pm	No. 15	Green Bay; Maggie Dixon Game	W 73–64	1–0	McGrath-Phillips Arena (1,571); Chicago, IL
Nov 17, 2018*; 1:00 pm	No. 15	No. 1 Notre Dame	L 77–101	1–1	Wintrust Arena (2,833); Chicago, IL
Nov 22, 2018*; 10:00 am	No. 16	vs. Princeton; Cancún Challenge Riviera Division	W 82–67	2–1	Hard Rock Hotel Riviera Maya; Cancún, Mexico
Nov 23, 2018*; 10:00 am	No. 16	vs. Kansas State; Cancún Challenge Riviera Division	W 79–59	3–1	Hard Rock Hotel Riviera Maya (300); Cancún, Mexico
Nov 24, 2018*; 12:30 pm	No. 16	vs. No. 14 Syracuse; Cancún Challenge Riviera Division	L 81–83 ^{OT}	3–2	Hard Rock Hotel Riviera Maya (300); Cancún, Mexico
Nov 26, 2018*; 7:00 pm	No. 16	Savannah State	W 124–61	4–2	McGrath-Phillips Arena (1,411); Chicago, IL
Nov 28, 2018*; 6:00 pm, SNY/ESPN3	No. 16	at No. 2 Connecticut	L 63–99	4–3	XL Center (7,186); Hartford, CT
Dec 3, 2018*; 11:00 am	No. 20	Temple	W 102–88	5–3	McGrath-Phillips Arena (3,057); Chicago, IL
Dec 5, 2018*; 7:00 pm	No. 20	Northwestern	W 76–60	6–3	McGrath-Phillips Arena (1,518); Chicago, IL
Dec 9, 2018*; 2:00 pm, FSSW	No. 20	at Oklahoma	W 87–76	7–3	Lloyd Noble Center (2,682); Norman, OK
Dec 17, 2018*; 7:00 pm	No. 20	Tennessee State	W 95–73	8–3	McGrath-Phillips Arena (1,542); Chicago, IL
Dec 20, 2018*; 7:00 pm	No. 20	at Loyola–Chicago	W 102–76	9–3	Joseph J. Gentile Arena (324); Chicago, IL
Big East regular season
Dec 29, 2018; 7:00 pm, BEDN	No. 20	Creighton	L 82–85	9–4 (0–1)	McGrath-Phillips Arena (1,723); Chicago, IL
Dec 31, 2018; 2:00 pm, BEDN	No. 24	Providence	W 88–62	10–4 (1–1)	McGrath-Phillips Arena (1,690); Chicago, IL
Jan 4, 2019; 7:00 pm, FS1	No. 24	at No. 20 Marquette	L 63–96	10–5 (1–2)	Al McGuire Center (1,613); Milwaukee, WI
Jan 11, 2019; 6:00 pm, BEDN		at Georgetown	W 69–64	11–5 (2–2)	McDonough Gymnasium (533); Washington, D.C.
Jan 13, 2019; 12:00 pm, BEDN		at Villanova	W 66–59 ^{OT}	12–5 (3–2)	Finneran Pavilion (819); Villanova, PA
Jan 18, 2019; 7:00 pm, NBCSCHI+/BEDN	No. 24	St. John's	W 73–64	13–5 (4–2)	McGrath-Phillips Arena (1,751); Chicago, IL
Jan 20, 2019; 2:00 pm, NBCSCHI+/BEDN	No. 24	Seton Hall	L 73–84	13–6 (4–3)	McGrath-Phillips Arena (1,571); Chicago, IL
Jan 25, 2019; 6:00 pm, BEDN		at Butler	W 86–78	14–6 (5–3)	Hinkle Fieldhouse (1,758); Indianapolis, IN
Jan 27, 2019; 1:00 pm, FS2		at Xavier	W 73–71 ^{OT}	15–6 (6–3)	Cintas Center (2,257); Cincinnati, OH
Feb 3, 2019; 1:00 pm, NBCSCHI/BEDN		No. 10 Marquette	L 87–93	15–7 (6–4)	McGrath-Phillips Arena (1,979); Chicago, IL
Feb 8, 2019; 7:00 pm, NBCSCHI+/BEDN		Villanova	W 93–70	16–7 (7–4)	McGrath-Phillips Arena (1,664); Chicago, IL
Feb 10, 2019; 2:00 pm, NBCSCHI+/BEDN		Georgetown	W 76–71	17–7 (8–4)	McGrath-Phillips Arena (1,852); Chicago, IL
Feb 15, 2019; 6:00 pm, BEDN		at Seton Hall	W 94–85	18–7 (9–4)	Walsh Gymnasium (782); South Orange, NJ
Feb 17, 2019; 12:00 pm, FS2		at St. John's	W 70–62	19–7 (10–4)	Madison Square Garden (19,812); New York, NY
Feb 22, 2019; 7:00 pm, BEDN		Xavier	W 81–48	20–7 (11–4)	Wintrust Arena (1,750); Chicago, IL
Feb 24, 2019; 2:00 pm, NBCSCHI/BEDN		Butler	W 76–62	21–7 (12–4)	Wintrust Arena (2,165); Chicago, IL
Mar 1, 2019; 6:00 pm, BEDN		at Providence	W 76–61	22–7 (13–4)	Alumni Hall (333); Providence, RI
Mar 3, 2019; 1:00 pm, FS2		at Creighton	W 74–67	23–7 (14–4)	D. J. Sokol Arena (1,148); Omaha, NE
Big East Women's Tournament
Mar 10, 2019; 6:00 pm, FS2	(2)	vs. (7) Providence; Quarterfinals	W 85–60	24–7	Wintrust Arena; Chicago, IL
Mar 11, 2019; 5:30 pm, FS1	(2)	vs. (6) Creighton; Semifinals	W 80–69	25–7	Wintrust Arena (1,853); Chicago, IL
Mar 12, 2019; 7:00 pm, FS1	(2)	vs. (1) No. 13 Marquette; Championship Game	W 74–73	26–7	Wintrust Arena (2,407); Chicago, IL
NCAA Women's Tournament
Mar 23, 2019*; 2:30 pm, ESPN2	(6 C) No. 24	vs. (11 C) Missouri State; First Round	L 78–89	26–8	Hilton Coliseum; Ames, IA
*Non-conference game. ^{#}Rankings from AP Poll. (#) Tournament seedings in parentheses. C=Chicago Region. All times are in Central Time.

== Rankings ==
Ranking movements Legend: ██ Increase in ranking ██ Decrease in ranking — = Not ranked RV = Received votes
	Week																			
Poll	Pre	1	2	3	4	5	6	7	8	9	10	11	12	13	14	15	16	17	18	Final
AP	15	15	16	16	20	20	20	20	24	RV	24	RV	RV	—	—	RV	RV	RV	RV	24
Coaches	15	15^	16	14	17	18	18	19	24	RV	24	RV	RV	RV	RV	RV	24	24	23	25

^Coaches' Poll did not release a second poll at the same time as the AP.

== See also ==
2018–19 DePaul Blue Demons men's basketball team
