= 2018–19 Xavier Musketeers women's basketball team =

Intercollegiate basketball season

2018–19 Xavier Musketeers women's basketball
- Conference: Big East Conference
- Record: 11–19 (2–16 Big East)
- Head coach: Brian Neal (8th season)
- Assistant coaches: Crystal Kelly; Christian Stefanopoulos; Mark Stephens
- Home arena: Cintas Center

2018–19 Big East Conference women's basketball standings
	Conf.				Overall
Team	W		L	PCT	W		L	PCT
No. 18 Marquette	15	–	3	.833	27	–	8	.771
No. 24 DePaul †	14	–	4	.778	26	–	8	.765
Butler	11	–	7	.611	23	–	10	.697
Villanova	9	–	9	.500	19	–	13	.594
Georgetown	9	–	9	.500	19	–	15	.559
Providence	8	–	10	.444	19	–	16	.543
Creighton	8	–	10	.444	15	–	16	.484
Seton Hall	7	–	11	.389	15	–	16	.484
St. John's	7	–	11	.389	15	–	16	.484
Xavier	2	–	16	.111	11	–	19	.367
† 2019 Big East tournament winner As of March 12, 2019; Rankings from AP poll

The 2018–19 Xavier Musketeers women's basketball team represented Xavier University during the 2018–19 NCAA Division I women's basketball season. The Musketeers, led by eighth-year head coach Brian Neal, played their games at the Cintas Center and were members of the Big East Conference. They finished the season 11–19, 2–16 in Big East play to finish in last place. They lost in the first round of the Big East women's tournament to Providence.

On March 10, Neal was fired. He finished at Xavier with an 8-year record of 76–108.

== Roster ==
2018–19 Xavier Musketeers women's basketball team
Players
Coaches

Pos.	#	Name	Height	Year	Previous school	Hometown
F	1	Sarah Leyendecker (redshirt)	6 ft 4 in (1.93 m)	So	Mother of Mercy; Akron	Lawrenceburg, IN
F	2	Deja Ross	6 ft 0 in (1.83 m)	So	Pomfret	Providence, RI
G	3	Aaliyah Dunham	5 ft 4 in (1.63 m)	So	South Charleston	South Charleston, WV
G	4	Lauren Wasylson	6 ft 0 in (1.83 m)	Fr	Mars	Valencia, PA
G	5	Princess Stewart	5 ft 9 in (1.75 m)	So	Franklin County	Frankfort, KY
G	10	Ashley Gomez	5 ft 9 in (1.75 m)	So	Westmoore HS	Oklahoma City, OK
G	15	Aly Reiff	5 ft 11 in (1.8 m)	So	Whitko	South Whitley, IN
G	20	Na'Teshia Owens	5 ft 5 in (1.65 m)	Jr	Mexia HS	Mexia, TX
F	21	A'Riana Gray	6 ft 0 in (1.83 m)	So	Maple Heights	Cleveland, OH
G	23	Maddy Johnson	5 ft 11 in (1.8 m)	Fr	Mater Dei	Irvine, CA
G	25	Carrie Gross	5 ft 11 in (1.8 m)	Fr	Rock Creek Christian Academy	Clinton, MD
F	40	Tierra Floyd	6 ft 1 in (1.85 m)	RS Jr	St. Bernard-Elmwood Place HS	Toledo, OH
F	44	Ayanna Townsend	6 ft 2 in (1.88 m)	Fr	Winchester Thurston	Pittsburgh, PA

Head coach

- Brian Neal (Northern Kentucky)

Assistant coach(es)

- Crystal Kelly (Western Kentucky)
- Christian Stefanopoulos (Thomas More)
- Mark Stephens (Morehead State)

Legend

- (C) Team captain
- (S) Suspended
- (I) Ineligible
- (W) Walk-on
- Injured
- Current redshirt

Roster

== Schedule ==
Date time, TV	Rank^{#}	Opponent^{#}	Result	Record	Site (attendance) city, state
Non-conference regular season
Nov 7, 2018*; 7:00 pm		Chicago State	W 91–57	1–0	Cintas Center (410); Cincinnati, OH
Nov 11, 2018*; 6:00 pm		Tennessee Tech	W 70–60	2–0	Cintas Center (648); Cincinnati, OH
Nov 14, 2018*; 7:00 pm		No. 25 Minnesota	L 53–78	2–1	Cintas Center (831); Cincinnati, OH
Nov 17, 2018*; 2:00 pm		Fairfield; Lauren Hill Tip-Off Classic	W 48–35	3–1	Cintas Center (1,522); Cincinnati, OH
Nov 21, 2018*; 7:00 pm, ACCN Extra		at Wake Forest	W 62–50	4–1	LJVM Coliseum (216); Winston–Salem, NC
Nov 29, 2018*; 11:30 am		Bowling Green	W 65–49	5–1	Cintas Center (3,628); Cincinnati, OH
Dec 2, 2018*; 2:00 pm		North Alabama	W 94–81 ^{OT}	6–1	Cintas Center (426); Cincinnati, OH
Dec 9, 2018*; 2:00 pm		Delaware State	W 80–59	7–1	Cintas Center (647); Cincinnati, OH
Dec 16, 2018*; 2:00 pm		at Cincinnati; Crosstown Shootout	L 61–79	7–2	Fifth Third Arena (3,053); Cincinnati, OH
Dec 18, 2018*; 7:00 pm		Alabama State	W 87–58	8–2	Cintas Center (416); Cincinnati, OH
Dec 22, 2018*; 12:00 pm		New Orleans	W 61–45	9–2	Cintas Center (458); Cincinnati, OH
Big East regular season
Dec 29, 2018; 5:00 pm, BEDN		at Georgetown	L 61–68	9–3 (0–1)	McDonough Gymnasium (591); Washington, D.C.
Dec 31, 2018; 1:00 pm, BEDN		at Villanova	L 71–75	9–4 (0–2)	Finneran Pavilion (909); Villanova, PA
Jan 4, 2018; 7:00 pm, BEDN		St. John's	L 57–76	9–5 (0–3)	Cintas Center (317); Cincinnati, OH
Jan 6, 2018; 2:00 pm, BEDN		Seton Hall	W 63–62 ^{OT}	10–5 (1–3)	Cintas Center (576); Cincinnati, OH
Jan 11, 2019; 7:00 pm, BEDN		Butler	L 41–63	10–6 (1–4)	Cintas Center (761); Cincinnati, OH
Jan 18, 2019; 8:00 pm, BEDN		at Creighton	L 62–66 ^{OT}	10–7 (1–5)	D. J. Sokol Arena (993); Omaha, NE
Jan 20, 2019; 1:00 pm, BEDN		at Providence	L 58–71	10–8 (1–6)	Alumni Hall (302); Providence, RI
Jan 25, 2018; 7:00 pm, BEDN		No. 10 Marquette	L 44–90	10–9 (1–7)	Cintas Center (943); Cincinnati, OH
Jan 27, 2019; 3:00 pm, FS2		DePaul	L 71–73 ^{OT}	10–10 (1–8)	Cintas Center (2,257); Cincinnati, OH
Feb 1, 2018; 7:00 pm, BEDN		at Seton Hall	W 80–76	11–10 (2–8)	Walsh Gymnasium (826); South Orange, NJ
Feb 3, 2018; 2:00 pm, BEDN		at St. John's	L 41–70	11–11 (2–9)	Carnesecca Arena (599); Queens, NY
Feb 8, 2019; 7:00 pm, BEDN		at Butler	L 38–63	11–12 (2–10)	Hinkle Fieldhouse (1,124); Indianapolis, IN
Feb 15, 2019; 7:00 pm, FS2		Providence	L 55–63	11–13 (2–11)	Cintas Center (1,185); Cincinnati, OH
Feb 17, 2019; 2:00 pm, BEDN		Creighton	L 52–53	11–14 (2–12)	Cintas Center (912); Cincinnati, OH
Feb 22, 2019; 8:00 pm, BEDN		at DePaul	L 48–81	11–15 (2–13)	Wintrust Arena (1,750); Chicago, IL
Feb 24, 2019; 3:00 pm, BEDN		at No. 11 Marquette	L 53–79	11–16 (2–14)	Al McGuire Center (2,187); Milwaukee, WI
Mar 1, 2019; 7:00 pm, FS2		Villanova	L 63–68	11–17 (2–15)	Cintas Center (786); Cincinnati, OH
Mar 3, 2019; 5:00 pm, BEDN		Georgetown	L 64–67	11–18 (2–16)	Cintas Center (583); Cincinnati, OH
Big East Women's Tournament
Mar 9, 2019; 5:30 pm, BEDN	(10)	vs. (7) Providence; First Round	L 62–70	11–19	Wintrust Arena; Chicago, IL
*Non-conference game. ^{#}Rankings from AP Poll. (#) Tournament seedings in parentheses. All times are in Eastern Time.

== See also ==
2018–19 Xavier Musketeers men's basketball team
