= 2018–19 Villanova Wildcats women's basketball team =

Intercollegiate basketball season

2018–19 Villanova Wildcats women's basketball

WNIT, Second Round
- Conference: Big East Conference
- Record: 19–13 (9–9 Big East)
- Head coach: Harry Perretta (41st season)
- Assistant coaches: Joe Mullaney; Laura Kurz; Shanette Lee
- Home arena: Finneran Pavilion

2018–19 Big East Conference women's basketball standings
	Conf.				Overall
Team	W		L	PCT	W		L	PCT
No. 18 Marquette	15	–	3	.833	27	–	8	.771
No. 24 DePaul †	14	–	4	.778	26	–	8	.765
Butler	11	–	7	.611	23	–	10	.697
Villanova	9	–	9	.500	19	–	13	.594
Georgetown	9	–	9	.500	19	–	15	.559
Providence	8	–	10	.444	19	–	16	.543
Creighton	8	–	10	.444	15	–	16	.484
Seton Hall	7	–	11	.389	15	–	16	.484
St. John's	7	–	11	.389	15	–	16	.484
Xavier	2	–	16	.111	11	–	19	.367
† 2019 Big East tournament winner As of March 12, 2019; Rankings from AP poll

The 2018–19 Villanova Wildcats women's basketball team represented Villanova University in the 2018–19 NCAA Division I women's basketball season. The Wildcats, led by 41st-year head coach Harry Perretta, returned to play home games at the newly updated Finneran Pavilion after a 1-year renovation and were members of the Big East Conference. They finished the season 19–13, 9–9 in Big East play to finish in a tie for fourth place. They lost in the quarterfinals of the Big East women's tournament to Georgetown. They received an at-large bid to the WNIT where they defeated Old Dominion in the first round before losing to West Virginia in the second round.

== Roster ==
2018–19 Villanova Wildcats women's basketball team
Players
Coaches

Pos.	#	Name	Height	Year	Previous school	Hometown
G	0	Cameron Onken	5 ft 10 in (1.78 m)	RS So	Lafayette Central Catholic	Lafayette, IN
F	1	Bridget Herlihy	6 ft 2 in (1.88 m)	RS Jr	Braintree	Braintree, MA
F	3	Grace Lange	5 ft 11 in (1.8 m)	So	Caravel Academy	Newark, DE
G	4	Mackenzie Gardler	5 ft 4 in (1.63 m)	Fr	Cardinal O'Hara	Broomall, PA
G	5	Brie Wajer (W)	5 ft 7 in (1.7 m)	Fr	Lincoln Academy	Newcastle, ME
G	10	Raven James	5 ft 6 in (1.68 m)	RS So	St. Paul VI	Upper Marlboro, MD
G	13	Samantha Carangi	5 ft 9 in (1.75 m)	RS Fr	North Penn	Lansdale, PA
F	14	Brianna Herlihy	6 ft 0 in (1.83 m)	RS So	Braintree	Braintree, MA
F	20	Maddy Siegrist	6 ft 1 in (1.85 m)	Fr	Our Lady of Lourdes	Poughkeepsie, NY
G/F	21	Jannah Tucker	6 ft 0 in (1.83 m)	Sr	New Town	Baltimore, MD
G	23	Emily Esposito	5 ft 9 in (1.75 m)	RS Fr	Gorham	Gorham, ME
G	25	Kelly Jekot	6 ft 0 in (1.83 m)	Jr	Cumberland Valley	Enola, PA
F	30	Mary Gedaka	6 ft 1 in (1.85 m)	Jr	Gloucester Catholic	Mullica Hill, NJ
G	31	Adrianna Hahn	5 ft 6 in (1.68 m)	Sr	Ursuline Academy	Wilmington, DE
G	45	Grace Stant	6 ft 0 in (1.83 m)	RS Sr	Rumson Fair Haven	Fair Haven, NJ

Head coach

- Harry Perretta (Lycoming)

Assistant coach(es)

- Joe Mullaney (Providence)
- Laura Kurz (Villanova)
- Shanette Lee (Villanova)

Legend

- (C) Team captain
- (S) Suspended
- (I) Ineligible
- (W) Walk-on
- Injured
- Current redshirt

Roster

== Schedule ==
Date time, TV	Rank^{#}	Opponent^{#}	Result	Record	Site (attendance) city, state
Exhibition
Nov 1, 2018*; 7:00 pm		East Stroudsburg	W 98–54		Finneran Pavilion; Villanova, PA
Regular season
Nov 7, 2018*; 7:00 pm		Hartford	W 59–41	1–0	Finneran Pavilion (845); Villanova, PA
Nov 16, 2018*; 6:00 pm		at Lehigh	W 70–48	2–0	Stabler Arena (957); Bethlehem, PA
Nov 20, 2018*; 7:00 pm		La Salle	W 81–68	3–0	Finneran Pavilion (535); Villanova, PA
Nov 24, 2018*; 12:00 pm		vs. Virginia Tech; UCF Thanksgiving Classic	L 59–61	3–1	CFE Arena; Orlando, FL
Nov 25, 2018*; 1:30 pm		at UCF; UCF Thanksgiving Classic	L 56–71	3–2	CFE Arena (730); Orlando, FL
Nov 28, 2018*; 7:00 pm		Princeton	W 67–46	4–2	Finneran Pavilion (601); Villanova, PA
Dec 2, 2018*; 2:00 pm, ESPN+		at Saint Joseph's; Holy War	W 47–35	5–2	Hagan Arena (1,138); Philadelphia, PA
Dec 6, 2018*; 7:00 pm, ESPN+		at George Washington	W 60–45	6–2	Charles E. Smith Center (884); Washington, D.C.
Dec 9, 2018*; 1:00 pm		Temple	W 76–68	7–2	Finneran Pavilion (761); Villanova, PA
Dec 14, 2018*; 7:00 pm		Georgia	W 62–56	8–2	Finneran Pavilion (659); Villanova, PA
Dec 29, 2018; 8:00 pm, FS2		Butler	L 55–63	8–3 (0–1)	Finneran Pavilion (641); Villanova, PA
Dec 31, 2018; 1:00 pm, BEDN		Xavier	W 75–71	9–3 (1–1)	Finneran Pavilion (909); Villanova, PA
Jan 4, 2019; 8:00 pm, BEDN		at Creighton	W 54–52	10–3 (2–1)	D. J. Sokol Arena (1,104); Omaha, NE
Jan 6, 2019; 1:00 pm, BEDN		at Providence	L 61–67	10–4 (2–2)	Alumni Hall (512); Providence, RI
Jan 11, 2019; 11:30 am, BEDN		No. 15 Marquette	L 55–91	10–5 (2–3)	Finneran Pavilion (1,401); Villanova, PA
Jan 13, 2019; 1:00 pm, BEDN		DePaul	L 59–66 ^{OT}	10–6 (2–4)	Finneran Pavilion (819); Villanova, PA
Jan 16, 2019*; 7:00 pm, ESPN+		at Penn	W 58–50	11–6	Palestra (621); Philadelphia, PA
Jan 19, 2019; 2:00 pm, BEDN		at Georgetown	L 63–68	11–7 (2–5)	McDonough Gymnasium (1,297); Washington, D.C.
Jan 25, 2019; 7:00 pm, BEDN		at Seton Hall	W 70–66	12–7 (3–5)	Walsh Gymnasium (902); South Orange, NJ
Jan 27, 2019; 2:00 pm, BEDN		at St. John's	W 73–57	13–7 (4–5)	Carnesecca Arena (754); Queens, NY
Feb 1, 2019; 7:00 pm, BEDN		Providence	W 53–33	14–7 (5–5)	Finneran Pavilion (601); Villanova, PA
Feb 3, 2019; 2:00 pm, FS1		Creighton	W 67–62 ^{2OT}	15–7 (6–5)	Finneran Pavilion (651); Villanova, PA
Feb 8, 2019; 8:00 pm, BEDN		at DePaul	L 70–93	15–8 (6–6)	McGrath-Phillips Arena (1,664); Chicago, IL
Feb 10, 2019; 3:00 pm, BEDN		at No. 8 Marquette	L 55–93	15–9 (6–7)	Al McGuire Center (2,234); Milwaukee, WI
Feb 16, 2019; 2:00 pm, BEDN		Georgetown	W 91–43	16–9 (7–7)	Finneran Pavilion (1,301); Villanova, PA
Feb 22, 2019; 7:00 pm, BEDN		St. John's	L 62–66	16–10 (7–8)	Finneran Pavilion (651); Villanova, PA
Feb 24, 2019; 1:00 pm, BEDN		Seton Hall	W 73–68	17–10 (8–8)	Finneran Pavilion (1,001); Villanova, PA
Mar 1, 2018; 7:00 pm, FS2		at Xavier	W 68–63	18–10 (9–8)	Cintas Center (786); Cincinnati, OH
Mar 3, 2019; 2:00 pm, BEDN		at Butler	L 60–62 ^{OT}	18–11 (9–9)	Hinkle Fieldhouse (1,012); Indianapolis, IN
Big East Women's Tournament
Mar 10, 2019; 3:30 pm, FS2	(5)	vs. (4) Georgetown; Quarterfinals	L 67–76	18–12	Wintrust Arena; Chicago, IL
WNIT
Mar 22, 2019*; 7:00 pm		Old Dominion; First Round	W 86–81 ^{OT}	19–12	Finneran Pavilion (521); Villanova, PA
Mar 24, 2019*; 3:00 pm		at West Virginia; Second Round	L 57–64	19–13	WVU Coliseum (1,388); Morgantown, WV
*Non-conference game. ^{#}Rankings from AP Poll. (#) Tournament seedings in parentheses. All times are in Eastern Time.

== Rankings ==
2018–19 NCAA Division I women's basketball rankings

Regular season polls
Poll	Pre- Season	Week 2	Week 3	Week 4	Week 5	Week 6	Week 7	Week 8	Week 9	Week 10	Week 11	Week 12	Week 13	Week 14	Week 15	Week 16	Week 17	Week 18	Week 19	Final
AP																				N/A
Coaches	RV	RV^	RV																	

Legend
	Increase in ranking
	Decrease in ranking
	Not ranked previous week
(RV)	Received Votes

^Coaches did not release a Week 2 poll.

== See also ==
- 2018–19 Villanova Wildcats men's basketball team
