= 2019 Big East women's basketball tournament =

- Classification: Division I
- Season: 2018–19
- Teams: 10
- Site: Wintrust Arena; Chicago, IL
- Champions: DePaul (4th title)
- Winning coach: Doug Bruno (4th title)
- MVP: Chante Stonewall (DePaul)
- Television: FS1, FS2, BEDN

2018–19 Big East Conference women's basketball standings
	Conf.				Overall
Team	W		L	PCT	W		L	PCT
No. 18 Marquette	15	–	3	.833	27	–	8	.771
No. 24 DePaul †	14	–	4	.778	26	–	8	.765
Butler	11	–	7	.611	23	–	10	.697
Villanova	9	–	9	.500	19	–	13	.594
Georgetown	9	–	9	.500	19	–	15	.559
Providence	8	–	10	.444	19	–	16	.543
Creighton	8	–	10	.444	15	–	16	.484
Seton Hall	7	–	11	.389	15	–	16	.484
St. John's	7	–	11	.389	15	–	16	.484
Xavier	2	–	16	.111	11	–	19	.367
† 2019 Big East tournament winner As of March 12, 2019; Rankings from AP poll

The 2019 Big East women's basketball tournament concluded the 2018–19 season of Big East Conference women's basketball. The event was held March 9–12, 2019, at Wintrust Arena in Chicago. DePaul won the championship game over Marquette, 74–73.

== Seeds ==
Marquette, DePaul and Butler have clinched first round byes. Xavier will play in the first round

2019 Big East women's basketball tournament seeds and results
Seed	School	Conf.	Over.	Tiebreaker
1	‡ † – Marquette	15–3	24–6	
2	† – DePaul	14–4	23–7	
3	† – Butler	11–7	21–8	
4	† – Georgetown	9–9	15–11	1–1 vs. VILL, 2–0 vs. PROV
5	† – Villanova	9–9	18–11	1–1 vs. GTOWN, 1–1 vs. PROV
6	† – Creighton	8–10	14–15	1–1 vs. PROV, 1–1 vs. GTOWN
7	Providence	8–10	16–14	1–1 vs. CREI, 0–2 vs. GTOWN
8	Seton Hall	7–11	15–14	2–0 vs. SJU
9	St. John's	7–11	14–15	0–2 vs. SHU
10	Xavier	2–16	11–18	
‡ – Big East regular season champions, and tournament No. 1 seed. † – Received a single-bye in the conference tournament. Overall records include all games played in the Big East tournament.

== Schedule ==
Game	Time*	Matchup^{#}	Television	Attendance
First round – Saturday, March 9
1	2:00 PM	#9 St. John's vs. #8 Seton Hall	BEDN	
2	4:30 PM	#10 Xavier vs. #7 Providence	BEDN	
Quarterfinals – Sunday, March 10
3	12:00 PM	#1 Marquette vs. #9 St. John's	FS2	2,164
4	2:30 PM	#4 Georgetownvs. #5 Villanova	FS2	2,164
5	6:00 PM	#2 DePaul vs. #7 Providence	FS2	2,164
6	8:30 PM	#3 Butler vs. #6 Creighton	FS2	2,164
Semifinals – Monday, March 11
7	3:00 PM	#1 Marquette vs. #4 Georgetown	FS1	1,853
8	5:30 PM	#2 DePaul vs. #6 Creighton	FS1	1,853
Championship – Tuesday, March 12
9	7:00 PM	#1 Marquette vs. #2 DePaul	FS1	2,407
*Game Times in CT. #-Rankings denote tournament seed

== Bracket ==
First round March 9
8	Seton Hall	51
9	St. John's	76
7	Providence	70
10	Xavier	62

Quarterfinals; March 10
1	Marquette	88
9	St. John's	57
4	Georgetown	76
5	Villanova	67
2	DePaul	85
7	Providence	60
3	Butler	51
6	Creighton	60

Semifinals; March 11
1	Marquette	75
4	Georgetown	62
2	DePaul	80
6	Creighton	69

Championship; March 12
1	Marquette	73
2	DePaul	74

* denotes overtime period

== See also ==
- 2019 Big East men's basketball tournament
