= Lincoln Christian School =

Coordinates: 40°45′15″N 96°36′30″W

Lincoln Christian School is a private, non-denominational PK-12 Christian school located in Lincoln, Nebraska on a 30-acre campus. The school was founded in 1951. It has almost 800 students and 80+ staff members.
