= St. Bonaventure Bonnies women's basketball =

2026–27 St. Bonaventure Bonnies women's basketball team
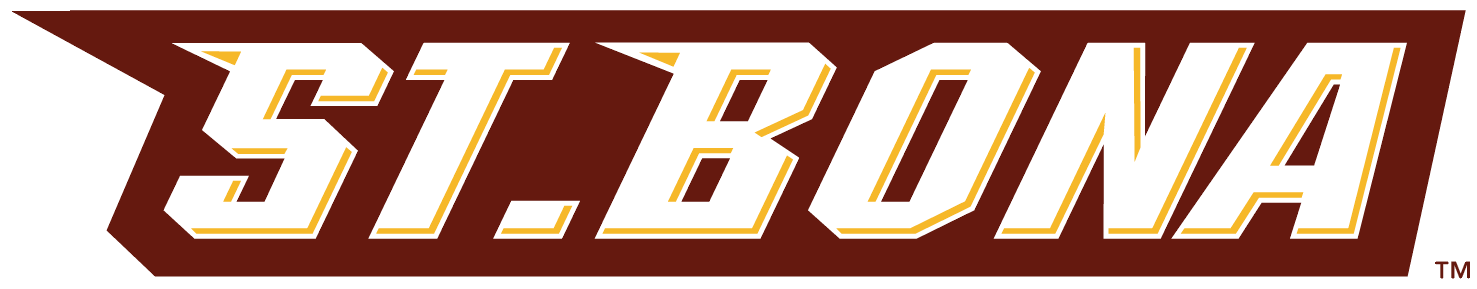
- University: St. Bonaventure University
- Head coach: Jim Crowley (3rd season in 2nd stint, 19th overall season)
- Location: St. Bonaventure, New York
- Arena: Reilly Center (capacity: 5,480)
- Conference: Atlantic 10
- Nickname: Bonnies
- Colors: Brown and white
- Student section: Bonnie Nation

NCAA Division I tournament Sweet Sixteen
- 2012

NCAA Division I tournament appearances
- 2012, 2016

Uniforms
Home	Away

The St. Bonaventure Bonnies women's basketball team (formerly the St. Bonaventure Brown Squaws) is the women's basketball team that represents St. Bonaventure University in Allegany, New York. The team currently competes in the Atlantic 10 Conference. The Bonnies' head coach is Jim Crowley, who returned for a second stint with the team in March 2023.

== Postseason ==
=== NCAA tournament results ===
The Bonnies have appeared in two NCAA Tournaments. Their combined record is 3–2.

Year	Seed	Round	Opponent	Result
2012	#5	First Round; Second Round; Sweet Sixteen	#12 Florida Gulf Coast #13 Marist #1 Notre Dame	W 72–65; W 66–63; L 35–79
2016	#10	First Round; Second Round	#7 Oklahoma State #2 Oregon State	W 65–54; L 40–69

=== NCAA tournament seeding history ===
Year →	'12	'16
Seed →	5	10

=== NIT results ===
The Bonnies have appeared in five National Invitation Tournaments. Their combined record is 6–5.

Year	Round	Opponent	Result
2009	Second Round; Third Round; Quarterfinals	West Virginia; Wisconsin; South Florida	W 68–63; W 56–51; L 66–80
2010	First Round; Second Round	Robert Morris; Northwestern	W 76–50; L 62–66
2011	First Round; Second Round	Lehigh; Syracuse	W 77–43; L 63–50
2014	First Round; Second Round	Charlotte; Bowling Green	W 81–62; L 65–76
2026	First Round; Second Round	Drexel; Middle Tennessee	W 69–67 ^{OT} L 50–69

== Season-by-season record ==
As of the 2016–17 season, the Bonnies have a 572–587 record, with a 183–306 Atlantic-10 Conference record. It was a club sport at St. Bonaventure from 1959–1971. They have made the WNIT in 2009, 2010, 2011, and 2014, going to the Quarterfinals in 2009. They made the NCAA Tournament in 2012 and 2016, going to the Sweet 16 in 2012 and the Round of 32 in 2016.

== Head coaching record ==
Record table
Season	Team	Overall	Conference	Standing	Postseason
St. Bonaventure Bonnies (Atlantic 10 Conference) (2000–present)
2000–01	St. Bonaventure	7–21	3–13		
2001–02	St. Bonaventure	13–15	7–9	9th	
2002–03	St. Bonaventure	6–22	3–13	12th	
2003–04	St. Bonaventure	9–19	5–11	9th	
2004–05	St. Bonaventure	9–19	4–12	T-11th	
2005–06	St. Bonaventure	8–19	3–12	14th	
2006–07	St. Bonaventure	16–15	6–8	10th	
2007–08	St. Bonaventure	18–12	6–8	T-7th	
2008–09	St. Bonaventure	23–11	10–6	T-4th	WNIT Quarterfinals
2009–10	St. Bonaventure	23–10	9–5	T-4th	WNIT second round
2010–11	St. Bonaventure	21–12	9–5	T-3rd	WNIT second round
2011–12	St. Bonaventure	31–4	14–0	1st	NCAA Division I Sweet Sixteen
2012–13	St. Bonaventure	10–19	3–11	14th	
2013–14	St. Bonaventure	24–11	11–5	T–2nd	WNIT second round
2014–15	St. Bonaventure	15–15	5–11	T–9th	
2015–16	St. Bonaventure	24–8	12–4	4th	NCAA Division I Round of 32
2016–17	St. Bonaventure	9–20	4–12	T-11th	
2017–18	St. Bonaventure	8–22	3–13	T-12th	
2018–19	St. Bonaventure	8–22	5–11	12th	
2019–20	St. Bonaventure	7–23	4–12	12th	
2020–21	St. Bonaventure	6–15	5–12	T-10th	
2021–22	St. Bonaventure	12–16	4–12	13th	
2022–23	St. Bonaventure	6–26	3–13	14th	
2023–24	St. Bonaventure	4–26	1–17	15th	
2024–25	St. Bonaventure	6–24	2–16	15th	
Total:		-–- (–)			
National champion Postseason invitational champion Conference regular season champion Conference regular season and conference tournament champion Division regular season champion Division regular season and conference tournament champion Conference tournament champion

== Broadcasting ==
WGWE/Little Valley, NY was the broadcast home of the team from 2014 until the station shut down in 2021. WGWE's morning host (Mike Smith from 2014 to 2016, and Chris Russell from 2016 to 2021) served as play-by-play voice throughout that time frame. In 2024, the team announced that WBRR/Bradford, Pennsylvania would serve as the team's flagship, with Russell returning; games not heard on WBRR would be carried on student radio station WSBU with student announcers. The university also signed an agreement with YES Network to televise four games, with streaming rights to those games held by the "Gotham Sports App" joint venture between YES and MSG Networks.
