= 2019 Women's National Invitation Tournament =

Postseason college basketball tournament

- Season: 2018–19
- Teams: 64
- Finals site: McKale Center, Tucson, Arizona
- Champions: Arizona (1st title)
- Runner-up: Northwestern (1st title game)
- Semifinalists: James Madison (9th semifinal); TCU (2nd semifinal)
- Winning coach: Adia Barnes (1st title)
- MVP: Aari McDonald (Arizona)
- Attendance: 14,644 (championship game)

The 2019 Women's National Invitation Tournament was a single-elimination tournament of 64 NCAA Division I teams that were not selected to participate in the 2019 Women's NCAA tournament. The tournament committee announced the 64-team field on March 18, following the selection of the NCAA Tournament field. The tournament began on March 20, 2019, and concluded on April 6, 2019, with the championship game televised on the CBS Sports Network. In the championship game, Arizona defeated Northwestern 56–42 to win the tournament.

== Participants ==
The 2019 Postseason WNIT field consists of 30 automatic invitations – one from each conference – and 34 at-large teams. Utah and LSU declined their respective automatic invitations. The declined spots were filled as part of the at–large selection process. The intention of the WNIT Selection Committee was to select the best available at-large teams in the nation. Teams with the highest finishes in their conferences’ regular-season standings that were not selected for the NCAA Tournament were offered an automatic berth. The remaining berths in the WNIT were filled by the best teams available. Teams considered for an at–large berth have overall records of .500 or better.

=== Automatic qualifiers ===
Conference	School
America East	Hartford
American	Cincinnati
Atlantic 10	VCU
ACC	Virginia Tech
Atlantic Sun	Stetson
Big 12	West Virginia
Big East	Butler
Big Sky	Idaho
Big South	High Point
Big Ten	Ohio State
Big West	Hawaii
CAA	James Madison
Conference-USA	UAB
Horizon League	Green Bay
Ivy League	Penn
MAAC	Rider
MAC	Ohio
MEAC	North Carolina A&T
Missouri Valley	Northern Iowa
Mountain West	New Mexico
Northeast	Sacred Heart
Ohio Valley	Morehead State
Pac-12	None (Note: Utah declined)
Patriot	American
SEC	None (Note: LSU declined)
Southern	Furman
Southland	Lamar
SWAC	Prairie View A&M
Summit League	Denver
Sun Belt	UT Arlington
WCC	Pepperdine
WAC	California Baptist

=== At-large bids ===
Conference	School
Pac–12	Arizona
SEC	Arkansas
Conference USA	Charlotte
Atlantic 10	Dayton
CAA	Drexel
Mountain West	Fresno State
Big East	Georgetown
Ivy League	Harvard
American	Houston
Big Sky	Idaho State
Horizon League	IUPUI
Mid–American	Kent State
WCC	Loyola Marymount
Mid–American	Miami (OH)
Conference USA	Middle Tennessee
Big Ten	Minnesota
CAA	Northeastern
Big Sky	Northern Colorado
Big Ten	Northwestern
Conference USA	Old Dominion
WCC	Pacific
Big East	Providence
WCC	Saint Mary's
Sun Belt	South Alabama
Big East	Seton Hall
American	South Florida
Southland	Stephen F. Austin
Big 12	TCU
Mid–American	Toledo
Sun Belt	Troy
Big East	Villanova
Conference USA	Western Kentucky
Mountain West	Wyoming
Horizon League	Youngstown State

== Bracket ==
All times are listed as Eastern Daylight Time (UTC−4)
* – Denotes overtime period

Round 1 March 20–22
Arkansas	88*
Houston	80
Troy	89
UAB	93
TCU	72
Prairie View A&M	41
UT Arlington	60
Stephen F. Austin	54
Green Bay	59
Kent State	64
Butler	89
Northeastern	72
Minnesota	91
Northern Iowa	75
Cincinnati	76
Youngstown State	62

Round 2 March 23–24
Arkansas	100
UAB	52
TCU	71
UT Arlington	54
Kent State	52
Butler	70
Minnesota	65
Cincinnati	72

Round 3 March 28
Arkansas	78
TCU	82
Butler	65
Cincinnati	72

Quarterfinals; March 31
TCU	69
Cincinnati	55

Round 1 March 20–22
West Virginia	83
Rider	43
Villanova	86*
Old Dominion	81
Toledo	71
Seton Hall	65
Northwestern	74
Dayton	51
Ohio State	61
Morehead State	71
Miami (OH)	63
Western Kentucky	67
Middle Tennessee	59
IUPUI	47
Ohio	81
High Point	74

Round 2 March 24
West Virginia	64
Villanova	57
Toledo	47
Northwestern	54
Morehead State	65
Western Kentucky	68
Middle Tennessee	57
Ohio	59

Round 3 March 27–28
West Virginia	54
Northwestern	56
Western Kentucky	60
Ohio	68

Quarterfinals; March 30
Northwestern	61
Ohio	58

Round 1 March 20–22
New Mexico	75
Denver	83
Loyola	64
Idaho	79
Arizona	66
Idaho State	56
Fresno State	72
Pacific	77
Wyoming	68
Northern Colorado	60
Lamar	71
South Alabama	73
Saint Mary's	67
Hawaii	43
Cal Baptist	79
Pepperdine	91

Round 2 March 24
Denver	66
Idaho	88
Arizona	64
Pacific	48
Wyoming	78
South Alabama	71
Saint Mary's	61
Pepperdine	65

Round 3 March 28
Idaho	60
Arizona	68
Wyoming	61
Pepperdine	60

Quarterfinals; March 31
Arizona	67
Wyoming	45

Round 1 March 20–22
James Madison	48
North Carolina A&T	37
South Florida	84
Stetson	50
VCU	65
Charlotte	52
Virginia Tech	92
Furman	65
Harvard	69
Drexel	56
Georgetown	90
Sacred Heart	59
Penn	64
American	45
Providence	71
Hartford	54

Round 2 March 24
James Madison	71
South Florida	54
VCU	72
Virginia Tech	82
Harvard	65
Georgetown	70
Penn	54
Providence	64

Round 3 March 27–28
James Madison	70
Virginia Tech	66
Georgetown	53
Providence	46

Quarterfinals; March 31
James Madison	54
Georgetown	44

=== Semifinals and Championship Game ===
Semifinals; April 3
James Madison	69
Northwestern	74
TCU	53
Arizona	59

Championship game April 6, 3:00 p.m. CBS Sports Network
Northwestern	42
Arizona	56

==== Semifinals ====
Wed., April 3
7:00 pm

Northwestern 74, James Madison 69
Scoring by quarter: 19–11, 15–16, 23–20, 17–22

JMU Convocation Center
Harrisonburg, Virginia
Attendance: 1,992

Wed., April 3
9:30 pm

TCU 53, Arizona 59
Scoring by quarter: 9–12, 14–17, 10–11, 20–19

McKale Center
Tucson, Arizona
Attendance: 10,135

==== Championship ====
CBSSN

Sat., April 6
3:00 pm

Northwestern 42, Arizona 56
Scoring by quarter: 12–16, 5–14, 16–19, 9–7

McKale Center
Tucson, Arizona
Attendance: 14,644

== All-tournament team ==
- Aari McDonald (Arizona), MVP
- Cat Reese (Arizona)
- Veronica Burton (Northwestern)
- Lindsey Pulliam (Northwestern)
- Jackie Benitez (James Madison)
- Amy Okonkwo (TCU)

== See also ==
- 2019 National Invitation Tournament
