= 2014–15 DePaul Blue Demons women's basketball team =

Intercollegiate basketball season

2014–15 DePaul Blue Demons women's basketball
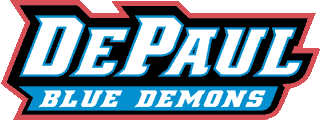

Big East Regular Season Co-Champions Big East tournament Champions

NCAA Women's Tournament, second round
- Conference: Big East Conference
- Record: 27–8 (15–3 Big East)
- Head coach: Doug Bruno (29th season)
- Assistant coaches: Candis Blankson; Bart Brooks; Jill M. Pizzotti
- Home arena: McGrath-Phillips Arena; Allstate Arena

2014–15 Big East Conference women's basketball standings
	Conf.				Overall
Team	W		L	PCT	W		L	PCT
Seton Hall *	15	–	3	.833	28	–	6	.824
DePaul †	15	–	3	.833	27	–	8	.771
Villanova	12	–	6	.667	22	–	14	.611
St. John's	11	–	7	.611	23	–	11	.676
Creighton	10	–	8	.556	17	–	14	.548
Butler	10	–	8	.556	14	–	16	.467
Xavier	8	–	10	.444	18	–	14	.563
Marquette	4	–	14	.222	9	–	22	.290
Providence	3	–	15	.167	6	–	24	.200
Georgetown	2	–	16	.111	4	–	27	.129
† 2015 Big East Basketball Tournament winner * Tournament #1 seed As of March 29, 2015; Rankings from AP poll

The 2014–15 DePaul Blue Demons women's basketball team represented DePaul University during the 2014–15 NCAA Division I women's basketball season. The Blue Demons, led by twenty ninth year head coach Doug Bruno, played their home games at the McGrath-Phillips Arena and Allstate Arena. They were members of the new Big East Conference. They finished the season 27–8, 15–3 in Big East play to share the regular season title with Seton Hall. They also won the Big East tournament to earn an automatic trip to the NCAA women's basketball tournament, where they defeated Minnesota in the first round before losing to Notre Dame in the second round.

== 2014–15 roster ==
2014–15 DePaul Blue Demons women's basketball team
Players
Coaches

Pos.	#	Name	Height	Year	Previous school	Hometown
F	4	Meri Bennett-Swanson (redshirt)	6 ft 3 in (1.91 m)	So	Vernon Hills	Vernon Hills, Ill.
G	33	Madeline Crowell	5 ft 10 in (1.78 m)	So	The Bryn Mawr School	Bel Air, Md.
F	5	ShaKeya Graves	5 ft 9 in (1.75 m)	So	John Glenn	Inkster, Mich.
F	35	Mart'e Grays	6 ft 2 in (1.88 m)	Fr	Detroit Martin Luther King Jr.	Detroit, Mich.
F	44	Brandi Harvey-Carr	6 ft 4 in (1.93 m)	So	Leap Academy	Camden, N.J.
G	12	Brittany Hrynko	5 ft 8 in (1.73 m)	Sr	Engineering and Science	Philadelphia, Pa.
G	14	Jessica January	5 ft 7 in (1.7 m)	So	Richfield	Richfield, Minn.
G	13	Chanise Jenkins	5 ft 5 in (1.65 m)	Jr	Whitney Young	Chicago, Ill.
F	15	Elri Liebenberg (redshirt)	6 ft 5 in (1.96 m)	Fr	Bergsig Academy	Rustenburg, South Africa
G	23	Centrese McGee	5 ft 7 in (1.7 m)	Sr	Thorton Fractional North	Calumet City, Ill.
G	1	Ashton Millender	5 ft 8 in (1.73 m)	Fr	Marian Catholic	Glenwood, Ill.
G/F	30	Megan Podkowa	6 ft 2 in (1.88 m)	Jr	Trinity	Glenview, Ill.
G	10	Lauren Prochaska	5 ft 8 in (1.73 m)	Fr	Trinity	Chicago, Ill.
G	21	Megan Rogowski	5 ft 9 in (1.75 m)	Sr	Hersey	Prospect Heights, Ill.
G	22	Brooke Schulte	5 ft 9 in (1.75 m)	So	Mater Dei	Germantown, Ill.
G	45	Meghan Waldron (redshirt)	5 ft 11 in (1.8 m)	Fr	Wheaton Warrenville South	Wheaton, Ill.

Head coach

Doug Bruno

Assistant coach(es)

Jill M. Pizzotti
Candis Blankson
Bart Brooks

Legend

- (C) Team captain
- (S) Suspended
- (I) Ineligible
- (W) Walk-on
- Injured
- Current redshirt

Roster
Last update: 2014-09-14

== Schedule ==
Date time, TV	Rank^{#}	Opponent^{#}	Result	Record	Site (attendance) city, state
Exhibition
10/28/2014*; 7:00 pm	No. 18	Saint Xavier	W 119–58	–	McGrath-Phillips Arena (222); Chicago, IL
11/06/2014*; 6:00 pm	No. 18	Robert Morris (Illinois)	W 137–76	–	McGrath-Phillips Arena (N/A); Chicago, IL
Regular season
11/14/2014*; 6:30 pm, BEDN	No. 18	No. 5 Texas A&M; Maggie Dixon Classic	L 68–76	0–1	McGrath-Phillips Arena (N/A); Chicago, IL
11/15/2014*; 6:30 pm	No. 18	Texas–Pan American; Maggie Dixon Classic	W 93–70	1–1	McGrath-Phillips Arena (2,323); Chicago, IL
11/16/2014*; 4:30 pm	No. 18	New Mexico; Maggie Dixon Classic	W 97–59	2–1	McGrath-Phillips Arena (2,139); Chicago, IL
11/18/2014*; 5:30 pm	No. 18	Bradley	W 101–77	3–1	Allstate Arena (5,340); Rosemont, IL
11/22/2014*; 7:00 pm	No. 18	South Dakota State	W 84–62	4–1	McGrath-Phillips Arena (1,722); Chicago, IL
11/29/2014*; 7:00 pm	No. 18	Northwestern	L 91–97 ^{2OT}	4–2	McGrath-Phillips Arena (2,565); Chicago, IL
12/03/2014; 12:00 pm, BEDN	No. 25	Butler	W 92–76	5–2 (1–0)	McGrath-Phillips Arena (4,001); Chicago, IL
12/07/2014*; 2:00 pm	No. 25	at Chicago State	W 87–34	6–2	Emil and Patricia Jones Convocation Center (228); Chicago, IL
12/10/2014*; 8:15 pm, FS2	No. 25	No. 5 Notre Dame	L 93–94 ^{OT}	6–3	McGrath-Phillips Arena (3,414); Chicago, IL
12/17/2014*; 11:00 am	No. 25	at Loyola (Chicago); Red Line Rivalry	W 109–84	7–3	Joseph J. Gentile Arena (849); Chicago, IL
12/19/2014*; 6:30 pm, SNY	No. 25	at No. 2 Connecticut	L 64–98	7–4	Webster Bank Arena (9,056); Bridgeport, CT
12/22/2014*; 7:00 pm		Hampton	W 86–67	8–4	McGrath-Phillips Arena (2,835); Chicago, IL
12/28/2014*; 2:00 pm		at Illinois State	W 99–64	9–4	Redbird Arena (1,057); Normal, IL
01/02/2015; 6:00 pm	No. 25	at Villanova	L 76–79 ^{OT}	9–5 (1–1)	The Pavilion (729); Villanova, PA
01/04/2015; 4:00 pm	No. 25	at Georgetown	W 105–85	10–5 (2–1)	McDonough Gymnasium (229); Washington, D.C.
01/09/2015; 7:00 pm, BEDN		at Marquette	W 101–67	11–5 (3–1)	Al McGuire Center (959); Milwaukee, WI
01/11/2015; 2:00 pm, CSNCH		Xavier	W 84–61	12–5 (4–1)	McGrath-Phillips Arena (2,535); Chicago, IL
01/16/2015; 10:30 am, BEDN		at St. John's	W 84–75 ^{OT}	13–5 (5–1)	Carnesecca Arena (5,602); Queens, NY
01/18/2015; 1:00 pm		at Seton Hall	L 87–107	13–6 (5–2)	Walsh Gymnasium (683); South Orange, NJ
01/23/2015; 8:15 pm, FS1		Creighton	W 96–71	14–6 (6–2)	McGrath-Phillips Arena (2,479); Chicago, IL
01/25/2015; 2:00 pm, CSNCH		Providence	W 90–42	15–6 (7–2)	McGrath-Phillips Arena (2,312); Chicago, IL
01/30/2015; 7:00 pm, CSNCH		Georgetown	W 93–52	16–6 (8–2)	McGrath-Phillips Arena (2,712); Chicago, IL
02/01/2015; 2:00 pm, CSNCH		Villanova	W 49–47	17–6 (9–2)	McGrath-Phillips Arena (1,808); Chicago, IL
02/06/2015; 10:30 am		at Butler	W 83–65	18–6 (10–2)	Hinkle Fieldhouse (804); Indianapolis, IN
02/08/2015; 1:00 pm		at Xavier	W 87–63	19–6 (11–2)	Cintas Center (2,025); Cincinnati, OH
02/13/2015; 7:00 pm, BEDN		Seton Hall	L 80–81	19–7 (11–3)	McGrath-Phillips Arena (2,825); Chicago, IL
02/15/2015; 1:00 pm, FS1		St. John's	W 82–55	20–7 (12–3)	McGrath-Phillips Arena (2,613); Chicago, IL
02/20/2015; 7:00 pm		at Creighton	W 78–76	21–7 (13–3)	D. J. Sokol Arena (1,184); Omaha, NE
02/22/2015; 12:00 pm, BEDN		at Providence	W 103–66	22–7 (14–3)	Alumni Hall (356); Providence, RI
03/01/2015; 3:00 pm, CBSSN		Marquette	W 99–82	23–7 (15–3)	McGrath-Phillips Arena (3,498); Chicago, IL
Big East tournament
03/08/2015; 6:00 pm, FS2		vs. Xavier; Quarterfinals	W 87–53	24–7	Allstate Arena (N/A); Rosemont, IL
03/09/2015; 8:00 pm, FS2		vs. Villanova; Semifinals	W 58–55	25–7	Allstate Arena (2,302); Rosemont, IL
03/09/2015; 7:00 pm, FS1		vs. No. 24 Seton Hall; Championship Game	W 78–68	26–7	Allstate Arena (3,226); Rosemont, IL
NCAA Women's Tournament
03/20/2015*; 4:00 pm, ESPN2		vs. Minnesota; First Round	W 79–72	27–7	Edmund P. Joyce Center (N/A); South Bend, IN
03/22/2015*; 9:00 pm, ESPN		at Notre Dame; Second Round	L 67–79	27–8	Edmund P. Joyce Center (5,658); South Bend, IN
*Non-conference game. ^{#}Rankings from AP Poll. (#) Tournament seedings in parentheses. All times are in Central Time.

== Rankings ==
Ranking movement Legend: ██ Increase in ranking. ██ Decrease in ranking. NR = Not ranked. RV = Received votes.
Poll	Pre	Wk 2	Wk 3	Wk 4	Wk 5	Wk 6	Wk 7	Wk 8	Wk 9	Wk 10	Wk 11	Wk 12	Wk 13	Wk 14	Wk 15	Wk 16	Wk 17	Wk 18	Final
AP	18	18	18	25т	25	25	RV	25	RV	RV	RV	RV	RV	RV	RV	RV	RV	RV	RV
Coaches	18	20	18	24	25	RV	25	24	RV	RV	RV	RV	RV	RV	RV	RV	RV	RV	RV
