= 2014–15 Marquette Golden Eagles women's basketball team =

Intercollegiate basketball season

2014–15 Marquette Golden Eagles women's basketball
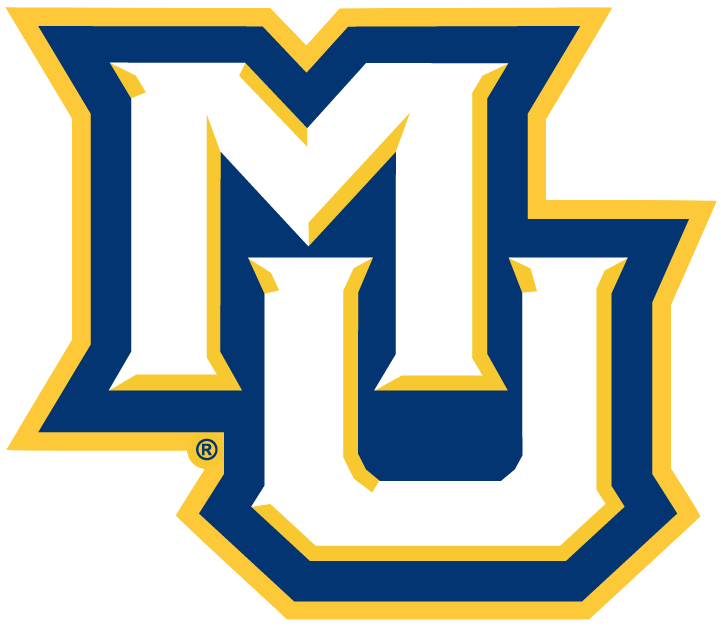
- Conference: Big East
- Record: 9–22 (4–14 Big East)
- Head coach: Carolyn Kieger (1st season)
- Assistant coaches: Ginny Boggess (1st season); Scott Merritt (1st season); Vernette Skeete (1st season)
- Home arena: Al McGuire Center

2014–15 Big East Conference women's basketball standings
	Conf.				Overall
Team	W		L	PCT	W		L	PCT
Seton Hall *	15	–	3	.833	28	–	6	.824
DePaul †	15	–	3	.833	27	–	8	.771
Villanova	12	–	6	.667	22	–	14	.611
St. John's	11	–	7	.611	23	–	11	.676
Creighton	10	–	8	.556	17	–	14	.548
Butler	10	–	8	.556	14	–	16	.467
Xavier	8	–	10	.444	18	–	14	.563
Marquette	4	–	14	.222	9	–	22	.290
Providence	3	–	15	.167	6	–	24	.200
Georgetown	2	–	16	.111	4	–	27	.129
† 2015 Big East Basketball Tournament winner * Tournament #1 seed As of March 29, 2015; Rankings from AP poll

The 2014–15 Marquette Golden Eagles women's basketball team represented Marquette University in the 2014–15 college basketball season. The Golden Eagles were led by 1st year head coach Carolyn Kieger and were members of the Big East Conference. The Golden Eagles played their home games at the Al McGuire Center. They finished the season 9–22, 4–14 in Big East play to finish in eighth place. They advanced to the quarterfinals of the Big East women's tournament where they lost to Seton Hall.

== 2014–15 Roster ==
2014–15 Marquette Golden Eagles women's basketball team
Players
Coaches

Pos.	#	Name	Height	Year	Previous school	Hometown
G	15	Kenisha Bell	5 ft 8 in (1.73 m)	Fr	Kennedy	Minneapolis, Minn.
G	35	Cristina Bigica	5 ft 10 in (1.78 m)	Sr	Grigore Moisil National College	Bucharest, Romania
C	34	Chelsie Butler	6 ft 5 in (1.96 m)	Sr	Minerva	Minerva, Ohio
G	21	Tia Elbert	5 ft 7 in (1.7 m)	Fr	Tartan	Oakdale, Minn.
G	2	Hannah Grim	5 ft 8 in (1.73 m)	Fr	Rosemount	Apple Valley, Minn.
G	4	Arlesia Morse	5 ft 10 in (1.78 m)	Sr	Hamady	Flint, Mich.
F	11	Apiew Ojulu	6 ft 3 in (1.91 m)	Sr	Lakeville North	Lakeville, Minn.
G	23	JeTaun Rouse	5 ft 9 in (1.75 m)	RS Fr	Marist	Chicago, Ill.
C	32	Lauren Tibbs	6 ft 4 in (1.93 m)	RS Jr	Scott	Taylor Mill, Ky.
F	31	Shantelle Valentine	6 ft 3 in (1.91 m)	Fr	St. Roch	Toronto, Ontario, Canada
G	3	McKayla Yentz	6 ft 1 in (1.85 m)	So	Sun Prairie	Sun Prairie, Wis.

Head coach

Carolyn Kieger (Marquette)

Assistant coach(es)

Ginny Boggess (Wingate)
Scott Merritt (Marquette)
Vernette Skeete (Alcorn State)

Legend

- (C) Team captain
- (S) Suspended
- (I) Ineligible
- (W) Walk-on
- Injured
- Current redshirt

Roster
Last update: 2014-09-14

== Schedule ==
Date time, TV	Rank^{#}	Opponent^{#}	Result	Record	Site (attendance) city, state
Exhibition
08/12/2014*; 12:00 pm		at AMW Team Frane	L 67–81	–	(N/A); Paris, France
08/15/2014*; 1:00 pm		vs. Netherlands	L 72–78 ^{2OT}	–	(N/A); Florence, Italy
08/16/2014*; 11:30 am		vs. Netherlands	W 77–66	–	(N/A); Florence, Italy
08/19/2014*; 11:30 am		vs. Netherlands	L 56–77	–	(N/A); Rome, Italy
11/09/2014*; 2:00 pm		Lewis	L 72–75	–	Al McGuire Center (990); Milwaukee, WI
Regular Season
11/15/2014*; 1:00 pm, BEDN		Green Bay	L 66–94	0–1	Al McGuire Center (1,399); Milwaukee, WI
11/17/2014*; 7:00 pm, TWCSC		Loyola (Chicago)	W 86–71	1–1	Al McGuire Center (980); Milwaukee, WI
11/21/2014*; 5:00 pm		at Wake Forest	L 77–89	1–2	LJVM Coliseum (821); Winston-Salem, NC
11/23/2014*; 1:00 pm		at No. 7 Duke	L 51–83	1–3	Cameron Indoor Stadium (4,080); Durham, NC
11/26/2014*; 7:00 pm, TWCSC		Milwaukee	W 85–80	2–3	Al McGuire Center (1,107); Milwaukee, WI
11/30/2014*; 2:00 pm		South Dakota	L 65–69	2–4	Al McGuire Center (749); Milwaukee, WI
12/02/2014*; 6:00 pm		at Auburn	L 53–79	2–5	Auburn Arena (2,590); Auburn, AL
12/06/2014*; 1:00 pm		at Wisconsin	L 64–89	2–6	Kohl Center (3,412); Madison, WI
12/15/2014*; 7:00 pm		Northern Kentucky	L 68–77	2–7	Al McGuire Center (757); Milwaukee, WI
12/18/2014*; 12:00 pm		Vanderbilt	W 80–67	3–7	Al McGuire Center (3,585); Milwaukee, WI
12/21/2014*; 2:00 pm		Western Illinois	W 65–57	4–7	Al McGuire Center (960); Milwaukee, WI
12/30/2014; 2:00 pm		Xavier	L 71–74	4–8 (0–1)	Al McGuire Center (824); Milwaukee, WI
01/02/2015; 6:30 pm, FS1		at Georgetown	L 76–83	4–9 (0–2)	McDonough Gymnasium (559); Washington, D.C.
01/04/2015; 12:00 pm		at Villanova	L 48–68	4–10 (0–3)	The Pavilion (609); Villanova, PA
01/09/2015; 7:00 pm, BEDN		DePaul	L 67–101	4–11 (0–4)	Al McGuire Center (959); Milwaukee, WI
01/11/2015; 2:00 pm		Butler	L 67–76	4–12 (0–5)	Al McGuire Center (969); Milwaukee, WI
01/16/2015; 6:00 pm, BEDN		at Seton Hall	L 58–88	4–13 (0–6)	Walsh Gymnasium (664); South Orange, NJ
01/18/2015; 1:00 pm		at St. John's	L 52–67	4–14 (0–7)	Carnesecca Arena (647); Queens, NY
01/23/2015; 7:00 pm		Providence	L 58–66	4–15 (0–8)	Al McGuire Center (892); Milwaukee, WI
01/25/2015; 7:00 pm		Creighton	L 75–93	4–16 (0–9)	Al McGuire Center (1,016); Milwaukee, WI
01/30/2015; 7:00 pm		Villanova	L 59–75	4–17 (0–10)	Al McGuire Center (1,059); Milwaukee, WI
02/01/2015; 2:00 pm, BEDN		Georgetown	W 80–73	5–17 (1–10)	Al McGuire Center (1,029); Milwaukee, WI
02/06/2015; 6:00 pm		at Xavier	L 72–91	5–18 (1–11)	Cintas Center (1,027); Cincinnati, OH
02/08/2015; 12:00 pm, BEDN		at Butler	W 77–74 ^{2OT}	6–18 (2–11)	Hinkle Fieldhouse (515); Indianapolis, IN
02/13/2015; 8:00 pm, FS1		St. John's	L 52–64	6–19 (2–12)	Al McGuire Center (1,140); Milwaukee, WI
02/15/2015; 2:00 pm		Seton Hall	W 73–70	7–19 (3–12)	Al McGuire Center (1,538); Milwaukee, WI
02/20/2015; 6:00 pm		at Providence	W 72–64	8–19 (4–12)	Alumni Hall (231); Providence, RI
02/22/2015; 1:00 pm		at Creighton	L 60–82	8–20 (4–13)	D. J. Sokol Arena (1,007); Omaha, NE
03/01/2015; 3:00 pm, CBSSN		at DePaul	L 82–99	8–21 (4–14)	McGrath-Phillips Arena (3,498); Chicago, IL
2015 Big East tournament
03/07/2015; 2:00 pm, BEDN		vs. Providence; First Round	W 78–75	9–21	Allstate Arena (N/A); Rosemont, IL
03/08/2015; 12:00 pm, FS2		vs. No. 25 Seton Hall; Quarterfinals	L 51–77	9–22	Allstate Arena (N/A); Rosemont, IL
*Non-conference game. ^{#}Rankings from AP Poll. (#) Tournament seedings in parentheses. All times are in Central.
