= List of Evanston Township High School alumni =

Evanston Township High School (ETHS), is a public four-year high school located in Evanston, Illinois, a North Shore suburb of Chicago, in the United States. It is part of Evanston Township High School District 202.

Notable alumni of Evanston Township High School include:

== Business ==
- Henry Engelhardt, CEO of the Admiral Group
- Lester Crown, businessman
- Bob Galvin (1940), CEO of Motorola (1959–86).
- Toby S. Wilt (1960), businessman and golfer.; member of Athletic Hall of Fame 1960 football team

== Film, television, and theatre ==
- Alan Bovik (1976, television engineer, vision scientist and Professor at University of Colorado Boulder.
- Heather Burns (1993), actress who appeared in films such as Miss Congeniality, Two Weeks Notice, and You've Got Mail.
- Joan Cusack (1980), actress (Working Girl and In & Out) also known for Addams Family Values, Broadcast News, School of Rock, Toys and the Toy Story franchise.
- John Cusack (1984), actor (High Fidelity), also known for Being John Malkovich, Con Air, Eight Men Out, The Grifters and Midnight in the Garden of Good and Evil.
- Jules Engel (1957), animator whose work includes Popeye the Sailor, and the Walt Disney films Fantasia and Bambi.
- Karen Finley (1974), artist, actress, educator and performer
- Zach Gilford (2000), actor, best known for his role on the television series Friday Night Lights.
- Jason Goff (1998), television and radio host, best known for hosting Chicago Bulls Pregame/Postgame Live on NBC Sports Chicago.
- Alicia Goranson (1992), actress, best known for her role as Becky Conner on the television series Roseanne.
- Laura Harrier (2008), actress, best known for her role as Liz in Spider-Man: Homecoming.
- Anders Holm (1999), actor and writer, best known for his role Anders "Ders" Holmvik on the television series Workaholics.
- Cassidy Hubbarth (2003), sports anchor for ESPN.
- Samantha Irby (1998), comedian, essayist, blogger, and television writer.
- Claudia Jennings (1968), actress known as the "Queen of B Movies" and also Playboy Playmate of the Month for November 1969 and Playmate of the Year for 1970.
- Amanda Jones (1968), Miss USA 1973.
- Lauren Lapkus (2004), actress and comedian, best known for her role as Susan Fischer in the Netflix original series Orange Is the New Black.
- Jeffrey Lieber (1987), writer who is co-creator of the television series Lost.
- Michael Madsen (1976), actor best known for roles in Reservoir Dogs and Kill Bill.
- Todd McCarthy (1968), film critic with Variety and The Hollywood Reporter.
- Lachlan McLean (1985), television news anchor and former sports talk radio host.
- Lynne Moody (1963), actress.
- Jessie Mueller (2001), theatre actress best known for roles in Broadway musicals Beautiful: The Carole King Musical and Waitress.
- Ajay Naidu (1990), actor who has appeared in Pi, Office Space, and the television series LateLine.
- Tom Neal (1932), stage, film and television actor and amateur boxer.
- Steve Pink (1984), director, screenwriter, and producer who worked on High Fidelity, Grosse Point Blank, and Hot Tub Time Machine.
- Jeremy Piven (1983), actor, best known for his roles as Ari Gold on the television series Entourage and as Harry Gordon Selfridge on the series Mr. Selfridge.
- Jeffrey Sweet (1967), member of the playwrights ensemble of the Victory Gardens Theater of Chicago, a member of the Council of the Dramatists Guild, and the author of an oral history of Second City
- Sophie Thatcher (2019), stage and television actress best known for her role in Yellowjackets.
- Dave VanDam (1973), American voice impressionist.
- Lena Waithe (2002), television writer, producer, and actress, known for playing Denise on the Netflix series Master of None
- Ruby Wax (1969, actress, comedian, and writer.
- Jenniffer Weigel (1988), television and radio personality.
- Rafer Weigel (1987), television news anchor and former Chicago sportscaster.

== Government and public service ==
- George Wildman Ball (1926), U.S. Under Secretary of State under Presidents Kennedy and Johnson and briefly United States Ambassador to the United Nations under Johnson.
- Jason Carter (1993), Georgia state senator and the 2014 Democratic nominee for governor of Georgia
- Ray Garrett Jr., chairman of the U.S. Securities and Exchange Commission
- David E. Miller (1980), Illinois state representative and 2010 Democratic nominee for Illinois comptroller.
- Sue Mullins, farmer and state legislator.
- John Edward Porter (1953), United States Congressman representing Illinois's 10th congressional district (1980–2001).
- Ellen Rosenblum(1969), Attorney General of the State of Oregon.

== Letters ==
- Jessica Abel (1987), comic book writer and artist.
- James Atlas (1967), president of Atlas & Company, publishers, and founding editor of the Penguin Lives Series.
- David Epstein (1998), author and investigative reporter at ProPublica.
- Cornelia Grumman (1981), editorial writer.
- Charles R. Johnson (1966), author whose novel Middle Passage won the 1990 National Book Award.
- Margaret Landon (1921), author whose book Anna and the King of Siam was adapted into the stage musical and film The King and I.
- Audrey Niffenegger (1980), artist and author of The Time Traveller's Wife.
- Jack N. Rakove (1964), author who received the 1997 Pulitzer Prize in History for the book Original Meanings: Politics and Ideas in the Making of the Constitution.
- Megan Twohey (1994), investigative reporter with The New York Times who published an investigation in 2017 detailing the sexual abuse allegations made against Harvey Weinstein.
- Jeffrey Gettleman (1989), international correspondent for the New York Times and the writer of his memoir, Love, Africa.

== Music ==
- David Burge (1947), composer, author, and pianist
- Bob Cranshaw, jazz bass player.
- Kay Davis, jazz singer.
- Alexander Frey, conductor, pianist, organist and recording artist.
- Ezra Furman (2004), lead singer of the rock/folk band "Ezra Furman and the Harpoons"
- Nancy Gustafson (1974), opera soprano.
- Junior Mance (1947), jazz pianist.
- D.A. Got That Dope AKA David Doman (2002), producer.

== Science, technology, and education ==
- Robert Axelrod (1961), political science professor at the University of Michigan, recipient of 2012 National Medal of Science
- Matthew Cook (1988), mathematician and computer scientist
- William E. Cross Jr. (1959) Academic, Black activist, and author.
- Ann Hardy (1951), computer pioneer.
- David Keightley. (1951?) University of California Sinologist.
- Dwight H. Perkins (1952), Harvard University economist of China.
- Jay Rosenberg (1959), philosopher, academic.
- Donald Rubin (1961), statistician
- Mary Lyndon Shanley (1963) Vassar College political scientist, feminist scholar.
- Sarah Whiting (1982), architect and Dean of the Harvard University Graduate School of Design
- Amie Wilkinson (1983), mathematician and professor at University of Chicago

== Sports ==
- Alex Agase (1941), football guard and head coach at Northwestern and Purdue inducted into the College Football Hall of Fame
- Lou Agase (1943), college football player and later coach, who later briefly served as head coach of the Toronto Argonauts of the Canadian Football League.
- Sebastian Cheeks (2022), college football outside linebacker for the Wisconsin Badgers
- Paddy Driscoll (1914), quarterback who was elected to both the Pro Football Hall of Fame and College Football Hall of Fame. He both played for and coached the Chicago Cardinals and Chicago Bears.
- Nojel Eastern (2017), basketball player for Rayos de Hermosillo
- Kevin Foster (1987), Major League Baseball pitcher (1993–98, 2001), playing most of his career with the Chicago Cubs.
- Clint Frank, halfback at Yale University who won the 1937 Heisman Trophy and was the first winner of the Maxwell Award.
- Eric Friedler (born 1954), tennis player
- Robert Gary (1991), Olympian (3,000 m steeplechase; 1996, 2004) and current head coach of Furman University's men's track & field and cross country teams.
- Dov Grumet-Morris (2000), ice hockey player
- William Heusner (1944), swimmer who competed at the 1948 Summer Olympics and won two medals at the 1951 Pan American Games.
- Damon Jones (1992), NFL tight end (1997–2001) for the Jacksonville Jaguars.
- Yonel Jourdain (1989, running back and kick returner for the Buffalo Bills.
- Mike Kenn (1974), NFL Pro Bowl offensive tackle (1978–94), playing for the Atlanta Falcons.
- Bob Lackey, All-American basketball player known as the "Black Swan", at Marquette University, who played two years for the New York Nets.
- Cecil Martin (1994), NFL fullback (1999–2003) who played for the Philadelphia Eagles and Tampa Bay Buccaneers.
- Ed Martin, USFL player
- Emery Moorehead (1972), NFL tight end who played most of his career for the Chicago Bears and was the starting tight end for the Super Bowl XX champion Chicago Bears.
- Steve Parker, NFL player
- Dan Peterson (1954), basketball coach who retired after leading Olimpia Milano to the 1987 Grand Slam Champions Cup, Italian Championship and Italian Cup.
- Jim Purnell (1960), NFL linebacker (1964–72) with the Chicago Bears.
- Richard Mason Rocca (1996), basketball player who played on the Italy national team and for Olimpia Milano.
- Mike Rogodzinski (1966), Major League Baseball outfielder for the Philadelphia Phillies (1973–75).
- Clarke Rosenberg (2011), American-Israeli basketball player in the Israel Basketball Premier League
- Diane Simpson-Bundy, Olympic gymnast and television broadcaster.
- Everette Stephens (1984), NBA guard (1988–91).
- Ray Woods (1913), brother of Ralf, three-time men's basketball All-American (1915–17) and one-time Helms National Player of the Year (1917) at Illinois.
- Pollyanna Johns Kimbrough (1994}, WNBA center (1998–2004) who played for the Charlotte Sting, Cleveland Rockers, Miami Sol, and Houston Comets.
