= Bill DeCorrevont =

American football player (1918–1995)

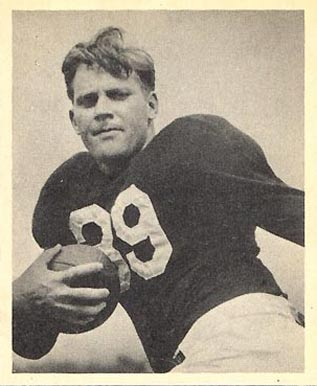
- DeCorrevont on a 1948 Bowman football card

No. 29, 76, 39, 36
- Positions: Defensive back, running back

Personal information
- Born: November 26, 1918; Chicago, Illinois, U.S.
- Died: September 6, 1995 (aged 76); Largo, Florida, U.S.
- Listed height: 6 ft 0 in (1.83 m)
- Listed weight: 186 lb (84 kg)

Career information
- High school: Austin (Chicago)
- College: Northwestern
- NFL draft: 1942: 14th round, 126th overall pick

Career history
- Washington Redskins (1945); Detroit Lions (1946); Chicago Cardinals (1947); Chicago Bears (1948–1949)

Awards and highlights
- NFL champion (1947); Second-team All-Big Ten (1941)

Career NFL statistics
- Rushing yards: 233
- Interceptions: 10
- Touchdowns: 3
- Stats at Pro Football Reference

William John DeCorrevont (November 26, 1918 – September 6, 1995) was an American professional football player who played for Northwestern University from 1938 to 1942 and multiple National Football League (NFL) teams from 1945 to 1949. He was born in Chicago on November 26, 1918, to Howard and Harriet (née Erickson) DeCorrevont and began both his football and baseball career at the now-defunct Austin High School on Chicago's West Side.

== Austin High School ==
=== 1936 season ===
By the 1936 football season, DeCorrevont was one of Austin's best players and a Chicago-area football star. That year, DeCorrevont helped Austin to defeat rival Tilden High School 31–13 for the Chicago Public School League championship, qualifying them for Chicago Mayor Edward J. Kelly's annual Christmas charity match. The game, which pitted Chicago's Catholic School League champion, Fenwick High School, against the Public School League Champion, Austin High School, brought an estimated 90,000 spectators to Soldier Field. DeCorrevont scored a touchdown and ended the game in a tie (19–19).

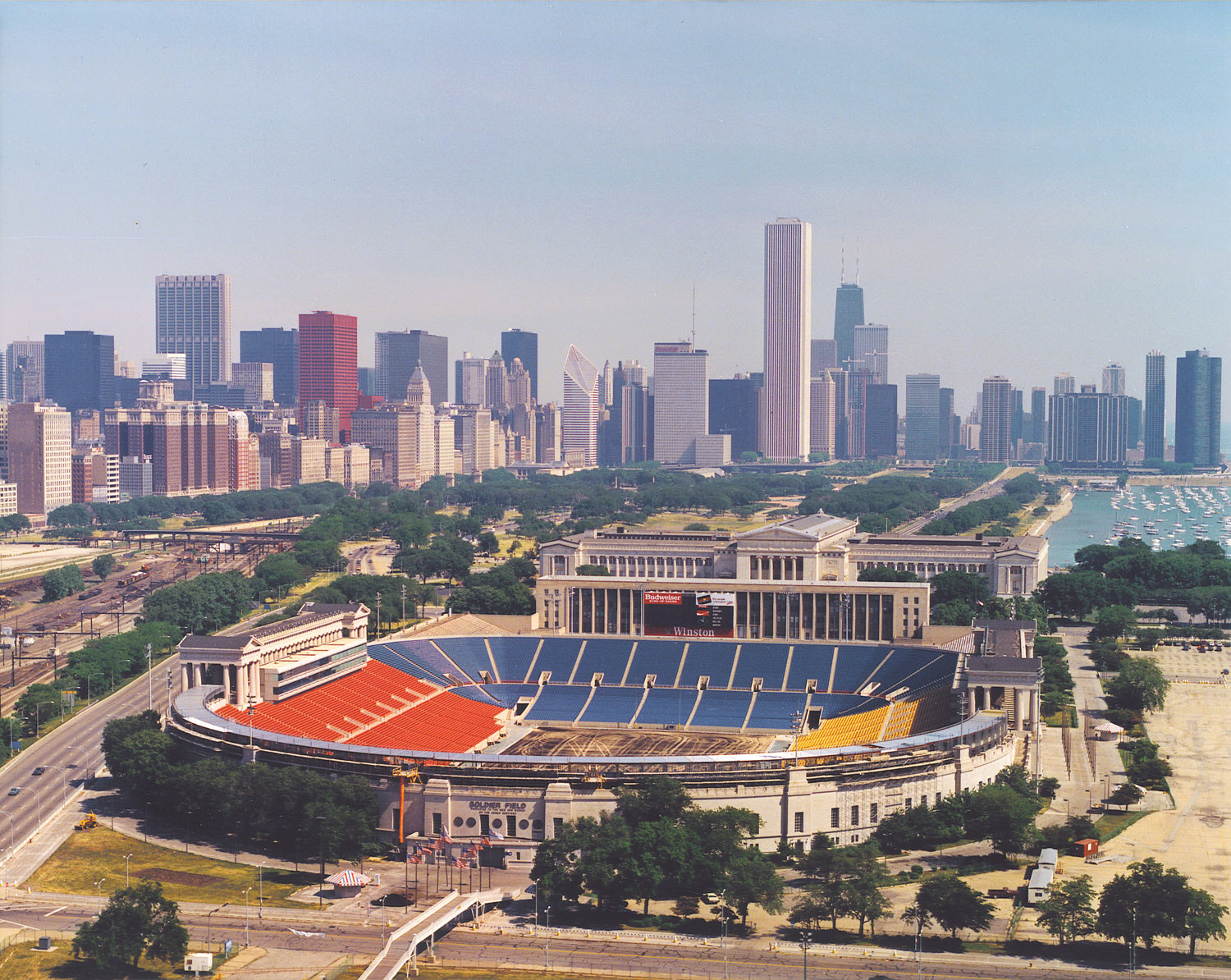
At the time of the 1937 Christmas Prep Game, more than 120,000 people overcrowded Soldier Field's 76,000-person capacity and flooded the surrounding area

=== 1937 season ===
In 1937, Austin High School beat McKinley High School 93–0, a new record, after DeCorrevont scored 9 touchdowns in 10 carries and kicked 3 extra points for a personal total of 57 points. His performance in the game gained him a spot in Ripley's Believe It or Not!. On March 16, 1942, DeCorrevont enlisted in the United States Navy and served as a Chief Petty Officer (Class A) until the end of the World War II in 1945. During his service, DeCorrevont was stationed for a time at the Naval Station Great Lakes just north of Northwestern, a base in Virginia, and United States Naval Training Center Bainbridge. He also played football sporadically for the official Navy team.

==== 1937 Christmas charity game ====
On November 27, 1937, DeCorrevont and Austin High School, the Public League champion, faced Leo Catholic High School, the Catholic League champion, for Mayor Kelly's annual charity game played at Soldier Field. At that time, Soldier Field had only about 76,000 seats, but managed to hold a record-breaking crowd, estimated at nearly 120,000, that turned out to watch DeCorrevont face off against Leo's star, Johnny Galvin. In the game, DeCorrevont ran three touchdowns, one for 47 yards, and passed for a fourth, leading Austin to a resounding victory, 26–0. The game garnered so much publicity for DeCorrevont that his broken collarbone (injured that December) gained mention in both the Chicago Tribune and The New York Times.

== Northwestern ==
A native Chicagoan, DeCorrevont did not want to stray too far from home, his widowed mother, or his high school sweetheart, for college. He chose Northwestern University for both its proximity to Chicago and its strong academic reputation, a choice which was possibly also aided by his familial connections to Wildcat football. One older cousin, George Wilson, had played as an end in the mid-1930s, and another, Jack Riley, had been an acclaimed football captain and All-American tackle at Northwestern in the 1930s as well. Enrolling at Northwestern alongside him were four former teammates from Austin: Alf Bauman, Sonny Skor, Chuck Feingarten, and Donald Johnson. DeCorrevont matriculated at Northwestern in 1938 and started playing on Northwestern's football and baseball teams his freshman year. He joined the Sigma Chi fraternity, as did his brother Howard "Bud" DeCorrevont (1917–1997) who attended Northwestern at the same time. Otto Graham, another famous Northwestern football player, joined the team in 1940 when DeCorrevont was a sophomore.

== NFL career ==
While still in the Navy, DeCorrevont was drafted by the Washington Redskins in the fourteenth round of the 1942 NFL draft, which was held in Chicago that year. However, did not begin to play professionally until his military service ended in 1945. After a year playing as a running back for the Redskins, DeCorrevont was traded to the Detroit Lions as a quarterback in 1946, again to the (then) Chicago Cardinals in 1947, and again to the Chicago Bears for his last two years of professional football (1948–49). Throughout his professional career, DeCorrevont rushed for 233 yards, had 10 interceptions, and scored three touchdowns.
