= 2014–15 Xavier Musketeers women's basketball team =

Intercollegiate basketball season

2014–15 Xavier Musketeers women's basketball

WBI, Quarterfinals
- Conference: Big East Conference
- Record: 18–15 (8–10 Big East)
- Head coach: Brian Neal (4th season)
- Assistant coaches: Carla D. Morrow; Bryce McKey; Garry Horton
- Home arena: Cintas Center

2014–15 Big East Conference women's basketball standings
	Conf.				Overall
Team	W		L	PCT	W		L	PCT
Seton Hall *	15	–	3	.833	28	–	6	.824
DePaul †	15	–	3	.833	27	–	8	.771
Villanova	12	–	6	.667	22	–	14	.611
St. John's	11	–	7	.611	23	–	11	.676
Creighton	10	–	8	.556	17	–	14	.548
Butler	10	–	8	.556	14	–	16	.467
Xavier	8	–	10	.444	18	–	14	.563
Marquette	4	–	14	.222	9	–	22	.290
Providence	3	–	15	.167	6	–	24	.200
Georgetown	2	–	16	.111	4	–	27	.129
† 2015 Big East Basketball Tournament winner * Tournament #1 seed As of March 29, 2015; Rankings from AP poll

The 2014–15 Xavier Musketeers women's basketball team represented Xavier University during the 2014–15 NCAA Division I women's basketball season. The Musketeers, led by fourth-year head coach Brian Neal, they played their games at the Cintas Center and were second-year members of the newly reorganized Big East Conference. They finished the season 18–15, 8–10 in Big East play, to finish in seventh place. They advanced to the quarterfinals of the Big East women's tournament where they lost to DePaul. They were invited to the Women's Basketball Invitational where they defeated to William & Mary in the first before losing to Siena in the quarterfinals.

== Roster ==
2014–15 Xavier Musketeers women's basketball team
Players
Coaches

Pos.	#	Name	Height	Year	Previous school	Hometown
G	0	Marquia Turner	5 ft 6 in (1.68 m)	Fr	Hoover HS	North Canton, OH
G	1	Kindell Fincher	5 ft 9 in (1.75 m)	Fr	Canterbury HS	Fort Wayne, IN
G	2	Maleeka Kynard (redshirt)	5 ft 6 in (1.68 m)	Sr	Start/Ohio State	Toledo, OH
G	5	Kayla Davis	5 ft 7 in (1.7 m)	So	St. Marguerite d'Youville	Brampton, ON
G	12	Jada Byrd	5 ft 9 in (1.75 m)	Sr	Redan HS	Lithonia, GA
F	14	Briana Glover	6 ft 2 in (1.88 m)	Jr	Mason	Mason, OH
G	15	Aliyah Zantt	5 ft 7 in (1.7 m)	Jr	Reynoldsburg HS	Reynoldsburg, OH
F	21	Maddison Blackwell	6 ft 0 in (1.83 m)	So	Lincoln HS	Gahanna, OH
G	22	Erica Dawson	5 ft 9 in (1.75 m)	RS Fr	Marietta HS	Marietta, OH
F	23	Leah Schaefer	6 ft 2 in (1.88 m)	Fr	Highlands HS	Alexandria, KY
G	24	Martha Thompson	5 ft 9 in (1.75 m)	RS Fr	Solon HS	Solon, OH
F	25	Anniina Äijänen	6 ft 2 in (1.88 m)	Fr	Sammon Keskuslukio	Tampere, Finland
G	30	Raeshaun Gaffney	5 ft 8 in (1.73 m)	RS So	Fairfield HS/Virginia	Fairfield, OH
F	31	Christina Ohlinger	5 ft 11 in (1.8 m)	So	Notre Dame Academy	Toledo, Ohio
G	34	Brianna Gladney	5 ft 8 in (1.73 m)	RS So	Ronald Reagan HS	San Antonio, TX
G	35	Jenna Crittendon	5 ft 10 in (1.78 m)	Jr	Ryle HS	Union, KY

Head coach

Brian Neal

Assistant coach(es)

Carla D. Morrow
Bryce McKey
Garry Horton

Legend

- (C) Team captain
- (S) Suspended
- (I) Ineligible
- (W) Walk-on
- Injured
- Current redshirt

Roster
Last update: 2024-04-01

== Schedule ==
Date time, TV	Rank^{#}	Opponent^{#}	Result	Record	Site (attendance) city, state
Regular season
11/15/2014*; 2:00 pm		Wofford	W 75–51	1–0	Cintas Center (1,589); Cincinnati, OH
11/17/2014*; 7:00 pm		Arkansas–Pine Bluff	W 89–52	2–0	Cintas Center (543); Cincinnati, OH
11/20/2014*; 7:00 pm, BEDN		Virginia	L 62–71	2–1	Cintas Center (714); Cincinnati, OH
11/22/2014*; 2:00 pm		at Binghamton	W 89–71	3–1	Binghamton University Events Center (1,378); Vestal, NY
11/26/2014*; 7:00 pm		Presbyterian	W 45–43	4–1	Cintas Center (743); Cincinnati, OH
11/30/2014*; 2:00 pm		Robert Morris	W 70–65 ^{OT}	5–1	Cintas Center (761); Cincinnati, OH
12/03/2014; 7:00 pm, BEDN		at St. John's	L 42–65	5–2 (0–1)	Carnesecca Arena (691); Queens, NY
12/07/2014*; 3:00 pm		at Middle Tennessee	L 68–90	5–3	Murphy Center (3,398); Murfreesboro, TN
12/10/2014*; 11:30 am		Monmouth	W 61–45	6–3	Cintas Center (1,732); Cincinnati, OH
12/14/2014*; 2:00 pm		at Cincinnati; Crosstown Classic	W 72–71	7–3	Fifth Third Arena (1,115); Cincinnati, OH
12/20/2014*; 2:00 pm		Lipscomb	W 62–38	8–3	Cintas Center (1,031); Cincinnati, OH
12/22/2014*; 12:00 pm		at Kennesaw State	L 60–61	8–4	KSU Convocation Center (367); Kennesaw, GA
12/30/2014; 8:00 pm		at Marquette	W 74–71	9–4 (1–1)	Al McGuire Center (824); Milwaukee, WI
01/02/2015; 7:00 pm		Creighton	W 66–65	10–4 (2–1)	Cintas Center (1,074); Cincinnati, OH
01/04/2015; 2:00 pm		Providence	W 71–49	11–4 (3–1)	Cintas Center (991); Cincinnati, OH
01/09/2015; 7:00 pm		at Seton Hall	L 54–78	11–5 (3–2)	Walsh Gymnasium (564); South Orange, NJ
01/11/2015; 3:00 pm		at DePaul	L 61–84	11–6 (3–3)	McGrath-Phillips Arena (2,535); Chicago, IL
01/16/2015; 7:00 pm		Georgetown	W 63–55	12–6 (4–3)	Cintas Center (N/A); Cincinnati, OH
01/18/2015; 12:00 pm, FS1		Villanova	L 34–54	12–7 (4–4)	Cintas Center (1,472); Cincinnati, OH
01/25/2015; 2:30 pm, FS1		Butler	L 54–58	12–8 (4–5)	Cintas Center (1,863); Cincinnati, OH
01/30/2015; 8:00 pm		at Creighton	L 65–74	12–9 (4–6)	D. J. Sokol Arena (1,002); Omaha, NE
02/01/2015; 1:00 pm		at Providence	W 68–57	13–9 (5–6)	Alumni Hall (177); Providence, RI
02/06/2015; 7:00 pm		Marquette	W 91–72	14–9 (6–6)	Cintas Center (1,027); Cincinnati, OH
02/08/2015; 2:00 pm		DePaul	L 63–87	14–10 (6–7)	Cintas Center (2,025); Cincinnati, OH
02/13/2015; 8:00 pm, BEDN		at Georgetown	W 60–55	15–10 (7–7)	McDonough Gymnasium (609); Washington, D.C.
02/15/2015; 1:00 pm, BEDN		at Villanova	L 48–64	15–11 (7–8)	The Pavilion (1,035); Villanova, PA
02/22/2015; 1:00 pm		at Butler	L 53–71	15–12 (7–9)	Hinkle Fieldhouse (1,086); Indianapolis, IN
02/27/2015; 2:00 pm		Seton Hall	L 60–77	15–13 (7–10)	Cintas Center (884); Cincinnati, OH
03/01/2015; 2:00 pm		St. John's	W 74–61	16–13 (8–10)	Cintas Center (1,286); Cincinnati, OH
Big East women's tournament
03/07/2015; 5:30 pm, BEDN		vs. Georgetown; First round	W 70–67	17–13	Allstate Arena (2,115); Rosemont, IL
03/08/2015; 7:00 pm, FS2		vs. DePaul; Quarterfinals	L 53–87	17–14	Allstate Arena (N/A); Rosemont, IL
WBI
03/19/2015*; 7:00 pm		William & Mary; First round	W 57–56	18–14	Cintas Center (624); Cincinnati, OH
03/22/2015*; 2:00 pm		Siena; Quarterfinals	L 49–69	18–15	Cintas Center (581); Cincinnati, OH
*Non-conference game. ^{#}Rankings from AP poll. (#) Tournament seedings in parentheses. All times are in Eastern Time.

== See also ==
- 2014–15 Xavier Musketeers men's basketball team
