= 2014–15 Seton Hall Pirates women's basketball team =

Intercollegiate basketball season

2014–15 Seton Hall Pirates women's basketball

Big East Regular Season Co-Champions

NCAA Women's Tournament, first round
- Conference: Big East Conference

Ranking
- Coaches: No. 24
- Record: 28–6 (15–3 Big East)
- Head coach: Anthony Bozzella
- Assistant coaches: Stephanie Oliver; Lauren DeFalco; Tiffany Jones-Smart
- Home arena: Walsh Gymnasium

2014–15 Big East Conference women's basketball standings
| | Conf. | | | | Overall |
| Team | W | | L | PCT | W | | L | PCT |
|---|---|---|---|---|---|---|---|---|
| Seton Hall * | 15 | – | 3 | .833 | 28 | – | 6 | .824 |
| DePaul † | 15 | – | 3 | .833 | 27 | – | 8 | .771 |
| Villanova | 12 | – | 6 | .667 | 22 | – | 14 | .611 |
| St. John's | 11 | – | 7 | .611 | 23 | – | 11 | .676 |
| Creighton | 10 | – | 8 | .556 | 17 | – | 14 | .548 |
| Butler | 10 | – | 8 | .556 | 14 | – | 16 | .467 |
| Xavier | 8 | – | 10 | .444 | 18 | – | 14 | .563 |
| Marquette | 4 | – | 14 | .222 | 9 | – | 22 | .290 |
| Providence | 3 | – | 15 | .167 | 6 | – | 24 | .200 |
| Georgetown | 2 | – | 16 | .111 | 4 | – | 27 | .129 |
† 2015 Big East Basketball Tournament winner * Tournament #1 seed As of March 29, 2015; Rankings from AP poll

The 2014–15 Seton Hall Pirates women's basketball team represented Seton Hall University during the 2014–15 NCAA Division I women's basketball season. The Pirates, led by second-year head coach Anthony Bozella, played their home games in Newark, New Jersey at the Walsh Gymnasium and were members of the Big East Conference. They finished the season 28–6, 15–3 in Big East play to share the Big East regular season title with DePaul. They advanced to the championship game of the Big East women's tournament, where they lost to DePaul. They received an at-large bid to the NCAA women's basketball tournament, where they lost to Rutgers in the first round. They ended with 28 wins in the regular season, the most wins in school history.

== Roster ==
2014–15 Seton Hall Pirates women's basketball team
Players
Coaches

| Pos. | # | Name | Height | Year | Hometown |
|---|---|---|---|---|---|
| G | 0 | Daisha Simmons | 5 ft 10 in (1.78 m) | GS | Jersey City, N.J. |
| F | 1 | Tabatha Richardson-Smith | 6 ft 0 in (1.83 m) | So | Bay City, TX |
| F | 2 | Tiffany Jones | 6 ft 3 in (1.91 m) | Jr | New York, NY |
| C | 3 | Chizoba Ekedigwe | 6 ft 5 in (1.96 m) | Sr | Laurel, MD |
| G | 10 | Jordan Mosley | 5 ft 9 in (1.75 m) | Sr | Orlando, FL |
| G | 11 | Ka-Deidre Simmons | 5 ft 8 in (1.73 m) | RS Sr | Newark, NJ |
| G | 13 | Samantha Bozzella | 5 ft 4 in (1.63 m) | Fr | West Orange, NJ |
| G | 15 | Aleesha Powell | 5 ft 6 in (1.68 m) | Sr | Philadelphia, PA |
| G/F | 21 | Kathleen Egan | 5 ft 10 in (1.78 m) | So | Aberdeen, NJ |
| G/F | 22 | Teresa Kucera | 6 ft 1 in (1.85 m) | So | Schwäbisch Hall, GER |
| G | 23 | Tara Inman | 5 ft 9 in (1.75 m) | So | Holmdale, NJ |
| C | 25 | Jordan Molyneaux | 6 ft 2 in (1.88 m) | Fr | Denver, CO |
| G/F | 30 | Claire Lundberg | 6 ft 1 in (1.85 m) | Fr | Andover, Minn. |
| C | 35 | Lubirdia Gordon | 6 ft 4 in (1.93 m) | So | Mount Vernon, NY |
| F | 44 | Janee Johnson | 6 ft 1 in (1.85 m) | GS | Matthews, NC |

Head coach

- Anthony Bozella (Seton Hall)

Assistant coach(es)

- Stephanie Oliver (Marist)
- Lauren DeFalco (Iona)
- Tiffany Jones-Smart (Saint Peter's)

Legend

- (C) Team captain
- (S) Suspended
- (I) Ineligible
- (W) Walk-on
- Injured
- Current redshirt

Roster

== Rankings ==
Ranking movement Legend: ██ Increase in ranking. ██ Decrease in ranking. NR = Not ranked. RV = Received votes.
| Poll | Pre | Wk 2 | Wk 3 | Wk 4 | Wk 5 | Wk 6 | Wk 7 | Wk 8 | Wk 9 | Wk 10 | Wk 11 | Wk 12 | Wk 13 | Wk 14 | Wk 15 | Wk 16 | Wk 17 | Wk 18 | Final |
|---|---|---|---|---|---|---|---|---|---|---|---|---|---|---|---|---|---|---|---|
| AP | NR | NR | NR | NR | NR | NR | RV | 23 | RV | RV | RV | RV | RV | RV | RV | RV | 25 | 24 | RV |
| Coaches | NR | RV | RV | RV | RV | RV | RV | RV | RV | RV | 25 | 25 | 24 | 24 | RV | 25 | 23 | 22 | 24 |

== Schedule ==
| Date time, TV | Rank^{#} | Opponent^{#} | Result | Record | Site (attendance) city, state |
Exhibition
| 11/08/2014*; 12:00 pm | | Philadelphia | W 86–64 | – | Walsh Gymnasium (431); South Orange, NJ |
Regular season
| 11/14/2014*; 12:00 pm, PSN | | Rider; WNIT Preseason First Round | W 66–47 | 1–0 | Walsh Gymnasium (1,186); South Orange, NJ |
| 11/17/2014*; 7:00 pm | | at No. 17 West Virginia; WNIT Preseason Second Round | L 87–89 | 1–1 | WVU Coliseum (1,078); Morgantown, WV |
| 11/22/2014*; 7:00 pm | | at Penn State; WNIT Preseason Consolation Round | W 75–70 | 2–1 | Bryce Jordan Center (3,114); University Park, PA |
| 11/26/2014*; 12:00 pm, PSN | | Kennesaw State | W 77–74 | 3–1 | Walsh Gymnasium (361); South Orange, NJ |
| 11/29/2014*; 12:00 pm, PSN | | Saint Peter's; Seton Hall Thanksgiving Classic semifinals | W 75–45 | 4–1 | Walsh Gymnasium (462); South Orange, NJ |
| 11/30/2014*; 2:30 pm, PSN | | Saint Joseph's; Seton Hall Thanksgiving Classic championship | W 77–60 | 5–1 | Walsh Gymnasium (502); South Orange, NJ |
| 12/03/2014; 8:00 pm, FS1 | | at Creighton | W 79–74 | 6–1 (1–0) | D. J. Sokol Arena (789); Omaha, NE |
| 12/05/2014*; 7:00 pm | | at Fordham | W 56–43 | 7–1 | Rose Hill Gymnasium (415); Bronx, NY |
| 12/07/2014*; 2:00 pm, PSN | | Lafayette | W 80–63 | 8–1 | Walsh Gymnasium (491); South Orange, NJ |
| 12/09/2014*; 7:00 pm, BEDN | | Illinois | W 82–72 | 9–1 | Walsh Gymnasium (467); South Orange, NJ |
| 12/18/2014*; 7:00 pm, PSN | | Fairfield | W 79–47 | 10–1 | Walsh Gymnasium (419); South Orange, NJ |
| 12/19/2014*; 7:00 pm, PSN | | NJIT | W 74–62 | 11–1 | Walsh Gymnasium (402); South Orange, NJ |
| 12/28/2014*; 2:00 pm, BEDN | | No. 14 Georgia | W 70–51 | 12–1 | Walsh Gymnasium (724); South Orange, NJ |
| 12/30/2014; 7:00 pm, PSN | No. 23 | Butler | W 70–65 | 13–1 (2–0) | Walsh Gymnasium (754); South Orange, NJ |
| 01/02/2015; 6:00 pm, CBSSN | No. 23 | at St. John's | L 50–59 | 13–2 (2–1) | Carnesecca Arena (960); Queens, NY |
| 01/09/2015; 7:00 pm, PSN | | Xavier | W 78–54 | 14–2 (3–1) | Walsh Gymnasium (564); South Orange, NJ |
| 01/11/2015; 1:00 pm | | at Providence | W 68–67 | 15–2 (4–1) | Alumni Hall (339); Providence, RI |
| 01/16/2015; 7:00 pm, PSN | | Marquette | W 88–58 | 16–2 (5–1) | Walsh Gymnasium (664); South Orange, NJ |
| 01/18/2015; 2:00 pm, PSN | | DePaul | W 107–87 | 17–2 (6–1) | Walsh Gymnasium (683); South Orange, NJ |
| 01/23/2015; 7:00 pm, FS1 | | at Villanova | W 59–56 | 18–2 (7–1) | The Pavilion (1,009); Villanova, PA |
| 01/25/2015; 12:00 pm | | at Georgetown | W 99–85 ^{OT} | 19–2 (8–1) | McDonough Gymnasium (587); Washington, D.C. |
| 02/01/2015; 2:00 pm, PSN | | St. John's | W 78–73 | 20–2 (9–1) | Walsh Gymnasium (1,638); South Orange, NJ |
| 02/06/2015; 8:00 pm, FS1 | | Providence | W 67–40 | 21–2 (10–1) | Walsh Gymnasium (1,146); South Orange, NJ |
| 02/08/2015; 2:00 pm, PSN | | Creighton | L 73–81 | 21–3 (10–2) | Walsh Gymnasium (760); South Orange, NJ |
| 02/13/2015; 8:00 pm, BEDN | | at DePaul | W 81–80 | 22–3 (11–2) | McGrath-Phillips Arena (2,825); Chicago, IL |
| 02/15/2015; 3:00 pm | | at Marquette | L 70–73 | 22–4 (11–3) | Al McGuire Center (1,538); Milwaukee, WI |
| 02/20/2015; 7:00 pm, PSN | | Georgetown | W 95–68 | 23–4 (12–3) | Walsh Gymnasium (727); South Orange, NJ |
| 02/22/2015; 2:00 pm, PSN | | Villanova | W 64–62 | 24–4 (13–3) | Walsh Gymnasium (1,074); South Orange, NJ |
| 02/27/2015; 7:00 pm | | at Xavier | W 77–60 | 25–4 (14–3) | Cintas Center (884); Cincinnati, OH |
| 03/01/2015; 1:00 pm | | at Butler | W 85–76 | 26–4 (15-3) | Hinkle Fieldhouse (452); Indianapolis, IN |
Big East Women's Tournament
| 03/08/2015; 1:00 pm, FS2 | No. 25 | vs. Marquette; Quarterfinals | W 77–51 | 27–4 | Allstate Arena (N/A); Rosemont, IL |
| 03/09/2015; 6:30 pm, FS1 | No. 24 | vs. St. John's; Semifinals | W 72–60 | 28–4 | Allstate Arena (N/A); Rosemont, IL |
| 03/10/2015; 8:00 pm, FS1 | No. 24 | vs. DePaul; Championship Game | L 68–78 | 28–5 | Allstate Arena (3,226); Rosemont, IL |
NCAA Women's Tournament
| 03/21/2015*; 6:30 pm, ESPN2 | | vs. Rutgers; First Round | L 66–79 | 28–6 | Gampel Pavilion (N/A); Storrs, CT |
*Non-conference game. ^{#}Rankings from AP Poll. (#) Tournament seedings in parentheses. All times are in Eastern Time.

== See also ==
- 2014–15 Seton Hall Pirates men's basketball team
