= 2014–15 Georgetown Hoyas women's basketball team =

Intercollegiate basketball season

2014–15 Georgetown Hoyas women's basketball
- Conference: Big East
- Record: 4–27 (2–16 Big East)
- Head coach: Natasha Adair (1st season)
- Assistant coaches: Melba Chambers (1st season); James Clark (1st season); Sarah Jenkins (1st season)
- Home arena: McDonough Gymnasium

2014–15 Big East Conference women's basketball standings
	Conf.				Overall
Team	W		L	PCT	W		L	PCT
Seton Hall *	15	–	3	.833	28	–	6	.824
DePaul †	15	–	3	.833	27	–	8	.771
Villanova	12	–	6	.667	22	–	14	.611
St. John's	11	–	7	.611	23	–	11	.676
Creighton	10	–	8	.556	17	–	14	.548
Butler	10	–	8	.556	14	–	16	.467
Xavier	8	–	10	.444	18	–	14	.563
Marquette	4	–	14	.222	9	–	22	.290
Providence	3	–	15	.167	6	–	24	.200
Georgetown	2	–	16	.111	4	–	27	.129
† 2015 Big East Basketball Tournament winner * Tournament #1 seed As of March 29, 2015; Rankings from AP poll

The 2014–15 Georgetown Hoyas women's basketball team represented Georgetown University in the 2014–15 college basketball season. The Hoyas were led by 1st year head coach Natasha Adair and were members of the Big East Conference. The Hoyas played their home games at the McDonough Gymnasium. They finished the season 4–27, 2–16 in Big East play to finish in last place. They lost in the first round of the Big East women's tournament to Xavier.

== Roster ==
2014–15 Georgetown Hoyas women's basketball team
Players
Coaches

Pos.	#	Name	Height	Year	Previous school	Hometown
G	1	Katie McCormick	5 ft 9 in (1.75 m)	Jr	Saint Mary's Ryken	Leonardtown, MD
G	2	Didi Burton	5 ft 5 in (1.65 m)	Fr	Baltimore City College	Baltimore, MD
G	3	Tyshell King	5 ft 11 in (1.8 m)	So	St. Frances Academy	Baltimore, MD
G	4	Chenya Sealey	5 ft 8 in (1.73 m)	Fr	Bartow	Bartoe, FL
F	10	Ki-Ke Rafiu	6 ft 2 in (1.88 m)	Jr	Saints Neumann-Goretti (PA)	Offa, Nigeria
G	12	Justyce Swango	5 ft 5 in (1.65 m)	Fr	Princess Anne	Virginia Beach, VA
G	13	Jade Martin	5 ft 11 in (1.8 m)	So	John F. Kennedy	Bloomington, MN
G/F	22	Logan Battle	6 ft 2 in (1.88 m)	Jr	West Springfield	Springfield, VA
F	24	Faith Woodard	6 ft 2 in (1.88 m)	So	Freedom	Brandon, FL
C	32	Yazmine Belk	6 ft 3 in (1.91 m)	Fr	Nazareth Regional	Queens, NY
F	33	Brittany Horne	6 ft 1 in (1.85 m)	Jr	Carmel	Carmel, NY
G	34	Dorothy Adomako	6 ft 1 in (1.85 m)	Fr	Cosby	Midlothian, VA
F	35	Dominique Vitalis	6 ft 2 in (1.88 m)	Jr	Gill St. Bernard's	Bloomfield, NJ

Head coach

- Natasha Adair (South Florida)

Assistant coach(es)

- Melba Chambers (Georgetown)
- James Clark (West Georgia College)/(Bethany College)
- Sarah Jenkins (Georgetown)

Legend

- (C) Team captain
- (S) Suspended
- (I) Ineligible
- (W) Walk-on
- Injured
- Current redshirt

Roster
Last update: 19 November 2014

== Schedule ==
Date time, TV	Rank^{#}	Opponent^{#}	Result	Record	Site (attendance) city, state
Regular Season
11/14/2014*; 7:00 pm		Maryland Eastern Shore	W 88–75	1–0	McDonough Gymnasium (1,273); Washington, D.C.
11/16/2014*; 2:00 pm		at Richmond	L 57–65	1–1	Robins Center (597); Richmond, VA
11/19/2014*; 8:00 pm		Loyola (MD)	W 71–44	2–1	McDonough Gymnasium (341); Washington, D.C.
11/21/2014*; 8:30 pm		vs. Temple; Hall of Fame Women's Challenge	L 58–81	2–2	Allen Fieldhouse (N/A); Lawrence, KS
11/22/2014*; 6:30 pm		vs. Alabama; Hall of Fame Women's Challenge	L 58–72	2–3	Allen Fieldhouse (1,719); Lawrence, KS
11/23/2014*; 2:00 pm, ESPN3		at Kansas; Hall of Fame Women's Challenge	L 42–55	2–4	Allen Fieldhouse (1,885); Lawrence, KS
11/28/2014*; 7:00 pm		Florida	L 73–81	2–5	McDonough Gymnasium (741); Washington, D.C.
11/30/2014*; 3:00 pm		vs. Holy Cross; Hall of Fame Women's Challenge	L 69–73	2–6	Mohegan Sun Arena (2,307); Uncasville, CT
12/06/2014*; 2:00 pm		at Princeton	L 54–83	2–7	Jadwin Gymnasium (769); Princeton, NJ
12/09/2014*; 7:00 pm, CSN+		at George Washington	L 60–72	2–8	Charles E. Smith Center (508); Washington, D.C.
12/13/2014*; 12:00 pm, BEDN		Memphis	L 46–63	2–9	McDonough Gymnasium (255); Washington, D.C.
12/22/2014*; 2:00 pm		St. Bonaventure	L 64–70	2–10	McDonough Gymnasium (203); Washington, D.C.
12/30/2014; 8:00 pm		at Creighton	L 61–76	2–11 (0–1)	D. J. Sokol Arena (1,372); Omaha, NE
01/02/2015; 7:30 pm, FS1		Marquette	W 83–76	3–11 (1–1)	McDonough Gymnasium (559); Washington, D.C.
01/04/2015; 5:00 pm		No. 25 DePaul	L 85–105	3–12 (1–2)	McDonough Gymnasium (229); Washington, D.C.
01/09/2015; 7:00 pm		Providence	W 69–61	4–12 (2–2)	McDonough Gymnasium (401); Washington, D.C.
01/11/2015; 5:00 pm, FS1		at Villanova	L 57–69	4–13 (2–3)	The Pavilion (819); Villanova, PA
01/16/2015; 7:00 pm		at Xavier	L 55–63	4–14 (2–4)	Cintas Center (N/A); Cincinnati, OH
01/18/2015; 1:00 pm		at Butler	L 58–63	4–15 (2–5)	Hinkle Fieldhouse (535); Indianapolis, IN
01/23/2015; 6:00 pm		St. John's	L 57–74	4–16 (2–6)	McDonough Gymnasium (311); Washington, D.C.
01/25/2015; 12:00 pm		Seton Hall	L 85–99 ^{OT}	4–17 (2–7)	McDonough Gymnasium (587); Washington, D.C.
01/30/2015; 8:00 pm		at DePaul	L 52–93	4–18 (2–8)	Sullivan Athletic Center (2,712); Chicago, IL
02/01/2015; 3:00 pm, BEDN		at Marquette	L 73–80	4–19 (2–9)	Al McGuire Center (1,029); Milwaukee, WI
02/08/2015; 5:00 pm		Villanova	L 48–64	4–20 (2–10)	McDonough Gymnasium (987); Washington, D.C.
02/13/2015; 8:00 pm, BEDN		Xavier	L 55–60	4–21 (2–11)	McDonough Gymnasium (609); Washington, D.C.
02/15/2015; 4:00 pm		Butler	L 56–65	4–22 (2–12)	McDonough Gymnasium (829); Washington, D.C.
02/20/2015; 7:00 pm, BEDN		at Seton Hall	L 68–95	4–23 (2–13)	Walsh Gymnasium (727); South Orange, NJ
02/22/2015; 2:00 pm		at St. John's	L 61–75	4–24 (2–14)	Carnesecca Arena (1,042); Queens, NY
02/27/2015; 7:00 pm		Creighton	L 62–71	4–25 (2–15)	McDonough Gymnasium (697); Washington, D.C.
03/01/2015; 7:00 pm		at Providence	L 66–81	4–26 (2–16)	Alumni Hall (696); Providence, RI
2015 Big East tournament
03/07/2015; 5:30 pm, BEDN		vs. Xavier; First Round	L 67–70	4–27	Allstate Arena (2,115); Rosemont, IL
*Non-conference game. ^{#}Rankings from AP Poll. (#) Tournament seedings in parentheses. All times are in Eastern.
