= 2014–15 Villanova Wildcats women's basketball team =

Intercollegiate basketball season

2014–15 Villanova Wildcats women's basketball

WNIT, Quarterfinals
- Conference: Big East Conference
- Record: 22–14 (12–6 Big East)
- Head coach: Harry Perretta (37th season)
- Assistant coaches: Joe Mullaney; Shanette Lee; Heather Vulin
- Home arena: The Pavilion

2014–15 Big East Conference women's basketball standings
	Conf.				Overall
Team	W		L	PCT	W		L	PCT
Seton Hall *	15	–	3	.833	28	–	6	.824
DePaul †	15	–	3	.833	27	–	8	.771
Villanova	12	–	6	.667	22	–	14	.611
St. John's	11	–	7	.611	23	–	11	.676
Creighton	10	–	8	.556	17	–	14	.548
Butler	10	–	8	.556	14	–	16	.467
Xavier	8	–	10	.444	18	–	14	.563
Marquette	4	–	14	.222	9	–	22	.290
Providence	3	–	15	.167	6	–	24	.200
Georgetown	2	–	16	.111	4	–	27	.129
† 2015 Big East Basketball Tournament winner * Tournament #1 seed As of March 29, 2015; Rankings from AP poll

The 2014–15 Villanova Wildcats women's basketball team represented Villanova University in the 2014–15 NCAA Division I women's basketball season. The Wildcats, led by thirty-seventh year head coach Harry Perretta, played their games at The Pavilion and were members of the Big East Conference. They finished the season 22–14, 12–6 in Big East play to finish in third place. They advanced to the semifinals of the Big East women's tournament, where they lost to DePaul. They were invited to the Women's National Invitation Tournament, where they defeated Maine in the first round, Old Dominion in the second round, Big East member St. John's in the third round before losing to West Virginia in the quarterfinals.

== Roster ==
2014–15 Villanova Wildcats women's basketball team
Players
Coaches

Pos.	#	Name	Height	Year	Previous school	Hometown
F	1	Taylor Holeman	6 ft 1 in (1.85 m)	Jr	LACES	Los Angeles, Calif.
G	2	Alex Louin (W)	6 ft 0 in (1.83 m)	Fr	Mount St. Joseph Academy	Doylestown, Pa.
G	4	Karlie Crispin	5 ft 6 in (1.68 m)	So	Pitman	Pitman, N.J.
G	5	Caroline Coyer	5 ft 10 in (1.78 m)	Jr	Oakton	Oak Hill, Va.
G	10	Katherine Coyer	5 ft 11 in (1.8 m)	Jr	Oakton	Oak Hill, Va.
G	11	Jordan Dillard	6 ft 0 in (1.83 m)	So	Decatur	Conyers, Ga.
C	12	Megan Quinn	6 ft 2 in (1.88 m)	Fr	Episcopal Academy	Berwyn, Pa.
F	20	Kate Brunori	5 ft 10 in (1.78 m)	Sr	Hilton Head Prep	Hilton Head, S.C.
F	21	Lauren Burford	6 ft 0 in (1.83 m)	Sr	Fairfax	Fairfax, Va.
G	22	Kendall Burton	5 ft 8 in (1.73 m)	Jr	Newton South	Newton Highlands, Mass.
F/C	23	Brandi Teague	6 ft 2 in (1.88 m)	RS So	American Heritage	Davie, Fla.
F	32	Samantha Wilkes	6 ft 1 in (1.85 m)	So	Immaculate Heart Academy	Fair Lawn, N.J.
F	35	Kavunaa Edwards	6 ft 0 in (1.83 m)	Jr	Pickerington North	Pickerington, Ohio
F/C	55	Emily Leer	6 ft 2 in (1.88 m)	Sr	Abington	Glenside, Pa.

Head coach

Harry Perretta

Assistant coach(es)

Joe Mullaney
Shanette Lee
Heather Vulin

Legend

- (C) Team captain
- (S) Suspended
- (I) Ineligible
- (W) Walk-on
- Injured
- Current redshirt

Roster

== Schedule ==
Date time, TV	Rank^{#}	Opponent^{#}	Result	Record	Site (attendance) city, state
Exhibition
11/02/2014*; 7:00 pm		Kutztown	W 84–42	–	The Pavilion (N/A); Villanova, PA
Non-conference regular season
11/14/2014*; 7:30 pm		vs. Chattanooga; Chattanooga Tournament	L 45–49	0–1	McKenzie Arena (2,290); Chattanooga, TN
11/15/2014*; 4:00 pm		vs. South Florida; Chattanooga Tournament	L 56–57	0–2	McKenzie Arena (223); Chattanooga, TN
11/21/2014*; 10:00 pm		at Cal State Fullerton	W 50–43	1–2	Titan Gym (209); Fullerton, CA
11/28/2014*; 2:30 pm		vs. Arizona State; Gulf Coast Showcase Quarterfinals	L 46–51	1–3	Germain Arena (N/A); Estero, FL
11/29/2014*; 12:00 pm		vs. Georgia Tech; Gulf Coast Showcase consolation 2nd round	L 63–71	1–4	Germain Arena (N/A); Estero, FL
11/30/2014*; 12:00 pm		vs. College of Charleston; Gulf Coast Showcase 7th place game	W 60–41	2–4	Germain Arena (N/A); Estero, FL
12/03/2014; 12:00 pm, BEDN		at Providence	L 49–51	2–5 (0–1)	Alumni Hall (1,685); Providence, RI
12/07/2014*; 1:00 pm		at Saint Joseph's	L 54–58	2–6	Hagan Arena (1,531); Philadelphia, PA
12/14/2014*; 7:30 pm		La Salle	W 70–36	3–6	The Pavilion (409); Villanova, PA
12/20/2014*; 7:00 pm		Sacred Heart	L 49–72	3–7	The Pavilion (391); Villanova, PA
12/22/2014*; 11:30 am, BEDN		Temple	W 64–59	4–7	The Pavilion (1,319); Villanova, PA
12/30/2014*; 7:00 pm		NC State	W 74–65	5–7	The Pavilion (609); Villanova, PA
01/02/2015; 7:00 pm		No. 25 DePaul	W 79–76 ^{OT}	6–7 (1–1)	The Pavilion (729); Villanova, PA
01/04/2015; 1:00 pm		Marquette	W 68–48	7–7 (2–1)	The Pavilion (609); Villanova, PA
01/09/2015; 8:00 pm, BEDN		at Creighton	W 65–61	8–7 (3–1)	D. J. Sokol Arena (1,007); Omaha, NE
01/11/2015; 5:00 pm, FS1		Georgetown	W 69–57	9–7 (4–1)	The Pavilion (819); Villanova, PA
01/16/2015; 7:00 pm		at Butler	L 58–72	9–8 (4–2)	Hinkle Fieldhouse (747); Indianapolis, IN
01/18/2015; 12:00 pm, FS1		at Xavier	W 54–34	10–8 (5–2)	Cintas Center (1,472); Cincinnati, OH
01/21/2015*; 7:00 pm		at Penn	W 70–44	11–8	Palestra (630); Philadelphia, PA
01/23/2015; 7:00 pm, FS1		Seton Hall	L 56–59	11–9 (5–3)	The Pavilion (1,009); Villanova, PA
01/25/2015; 12:00 pm		St. John's	W 81–69	12–9 (6–3)	The Pavilion (841); Villanova, PA
01/30/2015; 8:00 pm		at Marquette	W 75–59	13–9 (7–3)	Al McGuire Center (1,059); Milwaukee, WI
02/01/2015; 7:00 pm		at DePaul	L 47–49	13–10 (7–4)	Sullivan Athletic Center (1,808); Chicago, IL
02/05/2015; 5:00 pm		at Georgetown	W 64–48	14–10 (8–4)	McDonough Gymnasium (987); Washington, D.C.
02/13/2015; 7:00 pm		Butler	W 63–52	15–10 (9–4)	The Pavilion (809); Villanova, PA
02/15/2015; 1:00 pm, BEDN		Xavier	W 64–48	16–10 (10–4)	The Pavilion (1,035); Villanova, PA
02/20/2015; 7:00 pm, BEDN		at St. John's	L 51–56	16–11 (10–5)	Carnesecca Arena (921); Queens, NY
02/22/2015; 2:00 pm		at Seton Hall	L 62–64	16–12 (10–6)	Walsh Gymnasium (1,074); South Orange, NJ
02/27/2015; 8:00 pm, FS1		Providence	L 62–71	17–12 (11–6)	The Pavilion (841); Villanova, PA
03/01/2015; 1:00 pm		Creighton	W 61–53	18–12 (12–6)	The Pavilion (901); Villanova, PA
2015 Big East tournament
03/08/2015; 9:30 pm, FS2		vs. Butler; Quarterfinals	W 70–49	19–12	Allstate Arena (N/A); Rosemont, IL
03/09/2015; 9:00 pm, FS2		vs. DePaul; Semifinals	L 55–58	19–13	Allstate Arena (2,302); Rosemont, IL
WNIT
03/20/2015*; 7:00 pm		Maine; First Round	W 71–60	20–13	The Pavilion (367); Villanova, PA
03/22/2015*; 2:00 pm		Old Dominion; Second Round	W 71–66	21–13	The Pavilion (349); Villanova, PA
03/26/2015*; 7:00 pm, BEDN		St. John's; Third Round	W 63–55	22–13	The Pavilion (409); Villanova, PA
03/29/2015*; 7:00 pm		at West Virginia; Quarterfinals	L 70–75 ^{OT}	22–14	WVU Coliseum (2,509); Morgantown, WV
*Non-conference game. ^{#}Rankings from AP Poll. (#) Tournament seedings in parentheses. All times are in Eastern Time.

== See also ==
- 2014–15 Villanova Wildcats men's basketball team
