= 2014–15 St. John's Red Storm women's basketball team =

Intercollegiate basketball season

2014–15 St. John's Red Storm women's basketball

WNIT, Third Round
- Conference: Big East Conference
- Record: 23–11 (11–7 Big East)
- Head coach: Joe Tartamella (3rd season)
- Assistant coaches: Joseph Pellicane; Jonath Nicholas; Priscilla Edwards
- Home arena: Carnesecca Arena

2014–15 Big East Conference women's basketball standings
	Conf.				Overall
Team	W		L	PCT	W		L	PCT
Seton Hall *	15	–	3	.833	28	–	6	.824
DePaul †	15	–	3	.833	27	–	8	.771
Villanova	12	–	6	.667	22	–	14	.611
St. John's	11	–	7	.611	23	–	11	.676
Creighton	10	–	8	.556	17	–	14	.548
Butler	10	–	8	.556	14	–	16	.467
Xavier	8	–	10	.444	18	–	14	.563
Marquette	4	–	14	.222	9	–	22	.290
Providence	3	–	15	.167	6	–	24	.200
Georgetown	2	–	16	.111	4	–	27	.129
† 2015 Big East Basketball Tournament winner * Tournament #1 seed As of March 29, 2015; Rankings from AP poll

The 2014–15 St. John's Red Storm women's basketball team represented St. John's University during the 2014–15 NCAA Division I women's basketball season. The Red Storm were led by third-year head coach Joe Tartamella, played their games at Carnesecca Arena and were members of the Big East Conference. They finished the season 23–11, 11–7 in Big East play to finish in fourth place. They advanced to the semifinals of the Big East women's basketball tournament where they lost to Seton Hall. They were invited to the Women's National Invitation Tournament where they defeated Army in the first round, Fordham in the second round before losing to Big East member Villanova in the third round.

== Roster ==
2014–15 St. John's Red Storm women's basketball team
Players
Coaches

Pos.	#	Name	Height	Year	Previous school	Hometown
G	1	Tamesha Alexander	5 ft 7 in (1.7 m)	Fr	The Shipley School	Philadelphia, Pa.
F	54	Selina Archer	6 ft 4 in (1.93 m)	RS Sr	Miami	Clermont, Fla.
F	12	Kyra Dunn	6 ft 3 in (1.91 m)	RS Sr	California	Sacramento, Calif.
G	3	Aliyyah Handford	5 ft 9 in (1.75 m)	Jr	Shabazz	Newark, N.J.
G	4	Aaliyah Lewis	5 ft 5 in (1.65 m)	So	Bishop Ford (Brooklyn, N.Y.)	Staten Island, N.Y.
F	35	Imani Littleton	6 ft 3 in (1.91 m)	Fr	The Bishop's School	San Diego, Calif.
G	13	Crystal Simmons	5 ft 10 in (1.78 m)	Fr	Life Center Academy (N.J.)	Madrid, Spain
G	23	Kimberly Spruill (W)	5 ft 9 in (1.75 m)	So	Needham B. Broughton	Raleigh, N.C.
F	2	Amber Thompson	6 ft 2 in (1.88 m)	Jr	University High	Newark, N.J.
F	33	Sandra Udobi	6 ft 2 in (1.88 m)	Jr	Life Center Academy	Delta State, Nigeria
F	5	Tonoia Wade	6 ft 0 in (1.83 m)	Fr	Kennedy	Bloomington, Minn.
G/F	10	Jade Walker	6 ft 1 in (1.85 m)	Fr	DePaul Catholic	Maplewood, N.J.

Head coach

Joe Tartamella

Assistant coach(es)

Joseph Pellicane
Jonath Nicholas
Priscilla Edwards

Legend

- (C) Team captain
- (S) Suspended
- (I) Ineligible
- (W) Walk-on
- Injured
- Current redshirt

Roster

== Schedule ==
Date time, TV	Rank^{#}	Opponent^{#}	Result	Record	Site (attendance) city, state
Regular Season
11/15/2014*; 2:00 pm		at Yale	W 61–50	1–0	Payne Whitney Gymnasium (225); New Haven, CT
11/20/2014*; 7:00 pm, BEDN		Florida	W 72–66	2–0	Carnesecca Arena (1,272); Queens, NY
11/24/2014*; 7:00 pm		at Marist	W 49–48	3–0	McCann Field House (1,891); Poughkeepsie, NY
11/28/2014*; 2:00 pm, ESPN3		Binghamton	W 67–51	4–0	Carnesecca Arena (537); Queens, NY
11/30/2014*; 2:00 pm, ESPN3		Wagner	W 71–49	5–0	Carnesecca Arena (425); Queens, NY
12/03/2014; 7:00 pm, BEDN		Xavier	W 65–42	6–0 (1–0)	Carnesecca Arena (691); Queens, NY
12/07/2014*; 2:00 pm		at South Florida	W 55–52	7–0	USF Sun Dome (1,648); Tampa, FL
12/11/2014*; 7:00 pm, ESPN3		UCF	W 62–48	8–0	Carnesecca Arena (603); Queens, NY
12/14/2014*; 2:00 pm, ESPN3		NJIT	W 66–42	9–0	Carnesecca Arena (760); Queens, NY
12/20/2014*; 12:00 pm, ESPN3		Auburn; St. John's Chartwells Holiday Classic	W 56–49	10–0	Carnesecca Arena (N/A); Queens, NY
12/21/2014*; 2:30 pm, ESPN3		Indiana State; St. John's Chartwells Holiday Classic	L 67–73 ^{2OT}	10–1	Carnesecca Arena (765); Queens, NY
12/30/2014; 2:00 pm		at Providence	W 68–52	11–1 (2–0)	Alumni Hall (341); Providence, RI
01/02/2015; 6:00 pm, CBSSN		No. 23 Seton Hall	W 59–50	12–1 (3–0)	Carnesecca Arena (960); Queens, NY
01/04/2015*; 1:00 pm, ESPN2		vs. No. 2 Connecticut; Maggie Dixon Classic	L 54–70	12–2	Madison Square Garden (7,149); New York City, NY
01/09/2015; 8:00 pm, FS1		Butler	L 50–55	12–3 (3–1)	Carnesecca Arena (615); Queens, NY
01/11/2015; 2:00 pm		at Creighton	W 61–38	13–3 (4–1)	D. J. Sokol Arena (881); Omaha, NE
01/16/2015; 11:30 am, BEDN		DePaul	L 75–84 ^{OT}	13–4 (4–2)	Carnesecca Arena (5,602); Queens, NY
01/18/2015; 2:00 pm, ESPN3		Marquette	W 67–52	14–4 (5–2)	Carnesecca Arena (647); Queens, NY
01/23/2015; 6:00 pm		at Georgetown	W 74–57	15–4 (6–2)	McDonough Gymnasium (311); Washington, D.C.
01/25/2015; 12:00 pm		at Villanova	L 69–81	15–5 (6–3)	The Pavilion (841); Villanova, PA
02/01/2015; 2:00 pm		at Seton Hall	L 73–78	15–6 (6–4)	Walsh Gymnasium (1,638); South Orange, NJ
02/06/2015; 7:00 pm, BEDN		Creighton	L 50–75	15–7 (6–5)	Carnesecca Arena (881); Queens, NY
02/08/2015; 2:00 pm, ESPN3		Providence	W 70–49	16–7 (7–5)	Carnesecca Arena (1,008); Queens, NY
02/13/2015; 9:00 pm, FS1		at Marquette	W 64–52	17–7 (8–5)	Al McGuire Center (1,140); Milwaukee, WI
02/15/2015; 2:00 pm, FS1		at DePaul	L 55–82	17–8 (8–6)	McGrath-Phillips Arena (2,613); Chicago, IL
02/20/2015; 7:00 pm		Villanova	W 56–51	18–8 (9–6)	Carnesecca Arena (921); Queens, NY
02/22/2015; 2:00 pm, ESPN3		Georgetown	W 75–61	19–8 (10–6)	Carnesecca Arena (1,042); Queens, NY
02/27/2015; 7:00 pm		at Butler	W 60–49	20–8 (11–6)	Hinkle Fieldhouse (723); Indianapolis, IN
03/01/2015; 2:00 pm		at Xavier	L 61–74	20–9 (11–7)	Cintas Center (1,286); Cincinnati, OH
Big East tournament
03/08/2015; 3:30 pm, FS2		vs. Creighton; Quarterfinals	W 57–54	21–9	Allstate Arena (1,873); Rosemont, IL
03/09/2015; 6:30 pm, FS1		vs. No. 24 Seton Hall; Semifinals	L 60–72	21–10	Allstate Arena (N/A); Rosemont, IL
WNIT
03/19/2015*; 7:00 pm, ESPN3		Army; First Round	W 64–56	22–10	Carnesecca Arena (211); Queens, NY
03/22/2015*; 2:00 pm, ESPN3		Fordham; Second Round	W 77–63	23–10	Carnesecca Arena (327); Queens, NY
03/26/2015*; 7:00 pm, BEDN		at Villanova; Third Round	L 55–63	23–11	The Pavilion (409); Villanova, PA
*Non-conference game. ^{#}Rankings from AP Poll. (#) Tournament seedings in parentheses. All times are in Eastern Time.

== Rankings ==
Ranking movement Legend: ██ Increase in ranking. ██ Decrease in ranking. NR = Not ranked. RV = Received votes.
Poll	Pre	Wk 2	Wk 3	Wk 4	Wk 5	Wk 6	Wk 7	Wk 8	Wk 9	Wk 10	Wk 11	Wk 12	Wk 13	Wk 14	Wk 15	Wk 16	Wk 17	Wk 18	Final
AP	RV	RV	RV	RV	RV	RV	RV	RV	RV	RV	NR	NR	NR	NR	NR	NR	NR	NR	NR
Coaches	RV	RV	RV	RV	RV	NR	RV	RV	RV	RV	RV	RV	RV	RV	RV	RV	RV	RV	RV

== See also ==
- 2014–15 St. John's Red Storm men's basketball team
