= 2014–15 Butler Bulldogs women's basketball team =

Intercollegiate basketball season

2014–15 Butler Bulldogs women's basketball
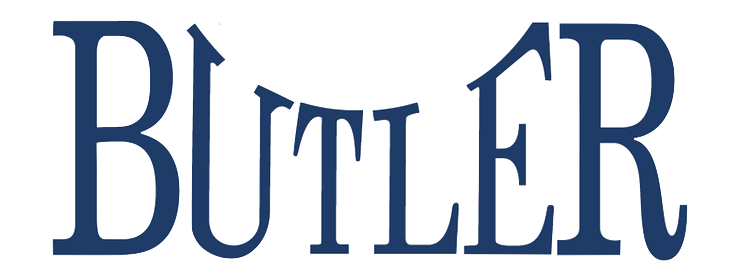
- Conference: Big East
- Record: 14–16 (10–8 Big East)
- Head coach: Kurt Godlevske (1st season)
- Assistant coaches: Damon Bailey (1st season); Julie Shelton (1st season); FahKara Malone (1st season)
- Home arena: Hinkle Fieldhouse

2014–15 Big East Conference women's basketball standings
	Conf.				Overall
Team	W		L	PCT	W		L	PCT
Seton Hall *	15	–	3	.833	28	–	6	.824
DePaul †	15	–	3	.833	27	–	8	.771
Villanova	12	–	6	.667	22	–	14	.611
St. John's	11	–	7	.611	23	–	11	.676
Creighton	10	–	8	.556	17	–	14	.548
Butler	10	–	8	.556	14	–	16	.467
Xavier	8	–	10	.444	18	–	14	.563
Marquette	4	–	14	.222	9	–	22	.290
Providence	3	–	15	.167	6	–	24	.200
Georgetown	2	–	16	.111	4	–	27	.129
† 2015 Big East Basketball Tournament winner * Tournament #1 seed As of March 29, 2015; Rankings from AP poll

The 2014–15 Butler Bulldogs women's basketball team represented Butler University in the 2014–15 college basketball season. The Bulldogs were led by new head coach Kurt Godlevske and were members of the Big East Conference. The Bulldogs played their home games at the Hinkle Fieldhouse. They finished the season 14–16, 10–8 in Big East play to finish in a tie fifth place. They lost in the quarterfinals in the Big East women's tournament to St. John's.

== Roster ==
2014–15 Butler Bulldogs women's basketball team
Players
Coaches

Pos.	#	Name	Height	Year	Previous school	Hometown
F	1	Ijeoma Uchendu	1 ft 1 in (0.33 m)	Fr	Oshodi	Lagos, Nigeria
G	2	Blaire Langlois	5 ft 8 in (1.73 m)	Jr	Carmel	Carmel, IN
F	3	Laura Tonner	5 ft 11 in (1.8 m)	Fr	Rensselaer Central	Rensselaer, Ind.
G/F	10	Nicole Orr	5 ft 10 in (1.78 m)	Fr	Reynoldsburg	Columbus, OH
G	11	Serena Sandusky	5 ft 8 in (1.73 m)	So	Bryan Station	Lexington, KY
G	12	Sydney Buck	5 ft 7 in (1.7 m)	Fr	Homestead	Fort Wayne, IN
G/F	13	Ijeoma Uchendu	6 ft 1 in (1.85 m)	Sr	Oshodi	Lagos, Nigeria
G	23	Lexus Murry	5 ft 7 in (1.7 m)	Jr	Decatur Central	Indianapolis, IN
F/C	24	Andriana Moore	6 ft 2 in (1.88 m)	Jr	East Chicago Central; Wabash Valley College	Chicago, IL
G	32	Loryn Goodwin	5 ft 9 in (1.75 m)	RS So	Cypress Falls	Houston, TX
C	33	Zoe Reichman	6 ft 4 in (1.93 m)	So	Blich	Savyon, Israel

Head coach

- Kurt Godlevske (Northern Michigan)

Assistant coach(es)

- Damon Bailey (Indiana)
- Julie Shelton (Butler)
- FahKara Malone (Purdue)

Legend

- (C) Team captain
- (S) Suspended
- (I) Ineligible
- (W) Walk-on
- Injured
- Current redshirt

Roster
Last update: 2014-10-15

== Schedule ==
Date time, TV	Rank^{#}	Opponent^{#}	Result	Record	Site (attendance) city, state
Exhibition
11/02/2014*; 2:00 pm		Northern Michigan	W 67–47	–	Hinkle Fieldhouse (419); Indianapolis, IN
Non-conference regular season
11/14/2014*; 5:00 pm, ESPN3		at Valparaiso	L 57–91	0–1	Athletics-Recreation Center (837); Valparaiso, IN
11/16/2014*; 1:00 pm, Big East Digital		Indiana State	L 51–66	0–2	Hinkle Fieldhouse (714); Indianapolis, IN
11/19/2014*; 7:00 pm, Butler TV		Chattanooga	L 47–76	0–3	Hinkle Fieldhouse (274); Indianapolis, IN
11/22/2014*; 1:00 pm, Fairfieldstags.tv		at Fairfield	L 77–81 ^{2OT}	0–4	Alumni Hall (957); Fairfield, CT
11/26/2014*; 3:00 pm		vs. BYU; Tom Weston Invitational	L 61–71	0–5	George Q. Cannon Activities Center (214); Laie, HI
11/27/2014*; 3:10 pm		vs. No. 19 Oregon State; Tom Weston Invitational	L 53–85	0–6	George Q. Cannon Activities Center (193); Laie, HI
11/29/2014*; 3:00 pm, BYUH Live Streaming		at BYU-Hawaiʻi; Tom Weston Invitational	W 71–50	1–6	George Q. Cannon Activities Center (113); Laie, HI
12/03/2014; 1:00 pm, Big East Digital		at No. 25 DePaul	L 76–92	1–7 (0–1)	Sullivan Athletic Center (4,001); Chicago, IL
12/05/2014*; 7:00 pm, Butler TV		Wright State	W 57–49	2–7	Hinkle Fieldhouse (605); Indianapolis, IN
12/07/2014*; 8:00 pm, BTN+		at Minnesota	L 86–88 ^{OT}	2–8	Williams Arena (3,477); Minneapolis, MN
12/13/2014*; 7:00 pm, Butler TV		Ball State	W 48–41	3–8	Hinkle Fieldhouse (743); Indianapolis, IN
12/22/2014*; 4:00 pm, RedBirdHD.tv		at Illinois State	W 72–60	4–8	Redbird Arena (515); Normal, IL
Big East Conference play
12/30/2014; 7:00 pm, Pirate SN		at No. 23 Seton Hall	L 65–70	4–9 (0–2)	Walsh Gymnasium (754); South Orange, NJ
01/02/2015; 2:00 pm, Butler TV		Providence	W 66–61	5–9 (1–2)	Hinkle Fieldhouse (463); Indianapolis, IN
01/04/2015; 1:00 pm, Big East Digital		Creighton	W 63–58	6–9 (2–2)	Hinkle Fieldhouse (385); Indianapolis, IN
01/09/2015; 8:00 pm, FS1		at St. John's	W 55–50	7–9 (3–2)	Carnesecca Arena (615); New York City, NY
01/11/2015; 3:00 pm, MU Tube		at Marquette	W 76–67	8–9 (4–2)	BMO Harris Bradley Center (969); Milwaukee, WI
01/16/2015; 7:00 pm, Butler TV		Villanova	W 72–58	9–9 (5–2)	Hinkle Fieldhouse (747); Indianapolis, IN
01/18/2015; 1:00 pm, Butler TV		Georgetown	W 63–58	10–9 (6–2)	Hinkle Fieldhouse (535); Indianapolis, IN
01/25/2015; 1:00 pm, FS1		at Xavier	T 54–54	11–9 (7–2)	Cintas Center (1,863); Cincinnati, OH
01/30/2015; 7:00 pm, Providence TV		at Providence	W 67–59	12–9 (8–2)	Dunkin' Donuts Center (242); Providence, RI
02/01/2015; 2:00 pm, Jays Video		at Creighton	L 55–62	12–10 (8–3)	D. J. Sokol Arena (335); Omaha, NE
02/06/2015; 11:30 am, Butler TV		DePaul	L 65–83	12–11 (8–4)	Hinkle Fieldhouse (804); Indianapolis, IN
02/08/2015; 1:00 pm, Butler TV		Marquette	L 74–77 ^{OT}	12–12 (8–5)	Hinkle Fieldhouse (515); Indianapolis, IN
02/13/2015; 7:00 pm, Nova Nation All Access		at Villanova	L 52–63	12–13 (8–6)	The Pavilion (809); Villanova, PA
02/15/2015; 4:00 pm, GU Hoyas Videos		at Georgetown	W 65–56	13–13 (9–6)	Verizon Center (829); Washington, D.C.
02/22/2015; 1:00 pm, Butler TV		Xavier	W 71–53	14–13 (10–6)	Hinkle Fieldhouse (1,086); Indianapolis, IN
02/27/2015; 7:00 pm, Butler TV		St. John's	L 49–60	14–14 (10–7)	Hinkle Fieldhouse (723); Indianapolis, IN
03/01/2015; 1:00 pm, Butler TV		Seton Hall	L 76–85	14–15 (10–8)	Hinkle Fieldhouse (452); Indianapolis, IN
Big East tournament
03/08/2015; 9:30 pm, FS2		vs. Villanova; Quarterfinals	L 49–70	14–16	Allstate Arena (N/A); Rosemont, IL
*Non-conference game. ^{#}Rankings from AP Poll. (#) Tournament seedings in parentheses. All times are in Eastern.
