= 2014–15 Creighton Bluejays women's basketball team =

Intercollegiate basketball season

2014–15 Creighton Bluejays women's basketball

WNIT, First Round
- Conference: Big East
- Record: 17–14 (10–8 Big East)
- Head coach: Jim Flanery (12th season)
- Assistant coaches: Matt Fritsche (2nd season); Chevelle Herring (2nd season); Carrie Moore (4th season)
- Home arena: D. J. Sokol Arena

2014–15 Big East Conference women's basketball standings
	Conf.				Overall
Team	W		L	PCT	W		L	PCT
Seton Hall *	15	–	3	.833	28	–	6	.824
DePaul †	15	–	3	.833	27	–	8	.771
Villanova	12	–	6	.667	22	–	14	.611
St. John's	11	–	7	.611	23	–	11	.676
Creighton	10	–	8	.556	17	–	14	.548
Butler	10	–	8	.556	14	–	16	.467
Xavier	8	–	10	.444	18	–	14	.563
Marquette	4	–	14	.222	9	–	22	.290
Providence	3	–	15	.167	6	–	24	.200
Georgetown	2	–	16	.111	4	–	27	.129
† 2015 Big East Basketball Tournament winner * Tournament #1 seed As of March 29, 2015; Rankings from AP poll

The 2014–15 Creighton Bluejays women's basketball team represented Creighton University in the 2014–15 college basketball season. The Bluejays were led by 12th year head coach Jim Flanery and were members of the Big East Conference. The Bluejays play their home games at the D. J. Sokol Arena. They finished the season 17–14, 10–8 in Big East play to finish in a tie fifth place. They lost in the quarterfinals of the Big East women's tournament to St. John's. They were invited to the Women's National Invitation Tournament where they lost to South Dakota in the first round.

== Roster ==
2014–15 Creighton Bluejays women's basketball team
Players
Coaches

Pos.	#	Name	Height	Year	Previous school	Hometown
G	1	Jade Owens	5 ft 6 in (1.68 m)	Fr	Fenwick	River Forest, IL
G	2	Myah Mellman	5 ft 7 in (1.7 m)	Fr	Mason City	Mason City, IA
G	3	MC McGrory	5 ft 8 in (1.73 m)	So	Edina	Edina, MN
G	5	Sammy Jensen	5 ft 5 in (1.65 m)	Sr	Ballard	Ames, IA
F	11	Bailey Norby	6 ft 2 in (1.88 m)	RS Fr	Forest Lake	Forest Lake, MN
G	12	Lauren Works	5 ft 7 in (1.7 m)	So	Lincoln Southwest	Lincoln, NE
G	14	Sydney Lamberty	5 ft 10 in (1.78 m)	Fr	Park	Cottage Grove, MN
G	20	Tessa Leytem	5 ft 11 in (1.8 m)	Jr	Wahlert Catholic	Dubuque, IA
G	21	Carli Tritz	5 ft 10 in (1.78 m)		Bishop Heelan	Sioux City, IA
G/F	22	Taylor Johnson	5 ft 11 in (1.8 m)	RS Jr	Platte County	Platte City, MO
G	23	Marissa Janning	5 ft 8 in (1.73 m)	Jr	Watertown-Mayer	Watertown, MN
F	33	Kylie Brown	6 ft 3 in (1.91 m)	Fr	Simley	Inver Grove Heights, MN
F	45	Alexis Akin-Otiko	5 ft 11 in (1.8 m)	Sr	Bellevue West	Bellevue, NE
F	50	Brianna Rollerson	6 ft 0 in (1.83 m)	So	Central	Omaha, NE

Head coach

- Jim Flanery (Creighton)

Assistant coach(es)

- Matt Fritsche (Nebraska–Kearney)
- Chevelle Herring (Creighton)
- Carrie Moore (Western Michigan)

Legend

- (C) Team captain
- (S) Suspended
- (I) Ineligible
- (W) Walk-on
- Injured
- Current redshirt

Roster
Last update: 1 August 2014

== Schedule ==
Date time, TV	Rank^{#}	Opponent^{#}	Result	Record	Site (attendance) city, state
Exhibition
11/05/2014*; 7:00 pm		Minnesota State–Mankato	W 85–68	–	D. J. Sokol Arena (663); Omaha, NE
Regular Season
11/15/2014*; 2:00 pm, ESPN3		at Wichita State	L 56–65	0–1	Charles Koch Arena (2,156); Wichita, KS
11/18/2014*; 7:00 pm		at South Dakota State	W 88–81	1–1	Frost Arena (1,821); Brookings, SD
11/20/2014*; 7:00 pm, BEDN		Utah	W 64–56	2–1	D. J. Sokol Arena (1,437); Omaha, NE
11/23/2014*; 12:00 pm, SNY		at No. 1 Connecticut	L 60–96	2–2	Harry A. Gampel Pavilion (7,123); Storrs, CT
11/28/2014*; 9:30 pm		vs. Cincinnati; Cal Classic semifinals	W 63–52	3–2	Haas Pavilion (2,309); Berkeley, CA
11/29/2014*; 9:00 pm		at California; Cal Classic championship	L 69–94	3–3	Haas Pavilion (1,455); Berkeley, CA
12/03/2014; 7:00 pm, FS1		Seton Hall	L 74–79	3–4 (0–1)	D. J. Sokol Arena (789); Omaha, NE
12/08/2014*; 7:00 pm		at Northern Iowa	W 58–56	4–4	McLeod Center (2,172); Cedar Falls, IA
12/11/2014*; 8:00 pm, FS1		No. 12 Nebraska	L 57–60	4–5	D. J. Sokol Arena (1,411); Omaha, NE
12/14/2014*; 2:00 pm		Drake	W 93–71	5–5	D. J. Sokol Arena (834); Omaha, NE
12/20/2014*; 12:00 pm		Omaha	W 67–50	6–5	D. J. Sokol Arena (1,064); Omaha, NE
12/22/2014*; 6:00 pm		Kansas	W 84–81 ^{OT}	7–5	D. J. Sokol Arena (1,248); Omaha, NE
12/30/2014; 7:00 pm		Georgetown	W 76–61	8–5 (1–1)	D. J. Sokol Arena (1,372); Omaha, NE
01/02/2015; 6:00 pm		at Xavier	L 65–66	8–6 (1–2)	Cintas Center (1,074); Cincinnati, OH
01/04/2015; 12:00 pm, BEDN		at Butler	L 58–63	8–7 (1–3)	Hinkle Fieldhouse (385); Indianapolis, IN
01/09/2015; 7:00 pm, BEDN		Villanova	L 61–65	8–8 (1–4)	D. J. Sokol Arena (1,007); Omaha, NE
01/11/2015; 1:00 pm		St. John's	L 38–61	8–9 (1–5)	D. J. Sokol Arena (881); Omaha, NE
01/16/2015; 6:00 pm, FS1		at Providence	W 65–54	9–9 (2–5)	Alumni Hall (706); Providence, RI
01/23/2015; 8:00 pm, FS1		at DePaul	L 71–96	9–10 (2–6)	McGrath-Phillips Arena (2,479); Chicago, IL
01/25/2015; 2:00 pm		at Marquette	W 93–75	10–10 (3–6)	Al McGuire Center (1,016); Milwaukee, WI
01/30/2015; 7:00 pm		Xavier	W 74–65	11–10 (4–6)	D. J. Sokol Arena (1,002); Omaha, NE
02/01/2015; 1:00 pm		Butler	W 62–55	12–10 (5–6)	D. J. Sokol Arena (335); Omaha, NE
02/06/2015; 6:00 pm, BEDN		at St. John's	W 75–50	13–10 (6–6)	Carnesecca Arena (881); Queens, NY
02/08/2015; 1:00 pm		at Seton Hall	W 81–73	14–10 (7–6)	Walsh Gymnasium (760); South Orange, NJ
02/15/2015; 1:00 pm, BEDN		Providence	W 84–57	15–10 (8–6)	D. J. Sokol Arena (1,412); Omaha, NE
02/20/2015; 7:00 pm		DePaul	L 76–78	15–11 (8–7)	D. J. Sokol Arena (1,184); Omaha, NE
02/22/2015; 1:00 pm		Marquette	W 82–60	16–11 (9–7)	D. J. Sokol Arena (1,007); Omaha, NE
02/27/2015; 6:00 pm		at Georgetown	W 71–62	17–11 (10–7)	McDonough Gymnasium (697); Washington, D.C.
03/01/2015; 12:00 pm		at Villanova	L 53–61	17–12 (10–8)	The Pavilion (901); Villanova, PA
2015 Big East tournament
03/08/2015; 2:30 pm, FS2		vs. St. John's; Quarterfinals	L 54–57	17–13	Allstate Arena (1,873); Rosemont, IL
WNIT
03/19/2015*; 7:00 pm		at South Dakota; First Round	L 58–68	17–14	DakotaDome (1,127); Vermillion, SD
*Non-conference game. ^{#}Rankings from AP Poll. (#) Tournament seedings in parentheses. All times are in Central.

== See also ==
- 2014–15 Creighton Bluejays men's basketball team
