= 2014–15 Providence Friars women's basketball team =

Intercollegiate basketball season

2014–15 Providence Friars women's basketball
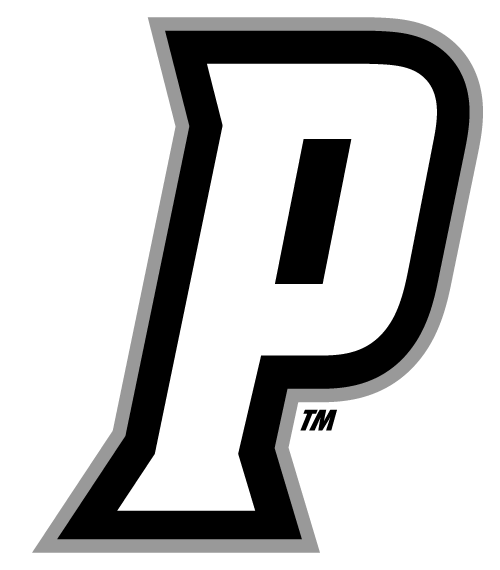
- Conference: Big East
- Record: 6–24 (3–15 Big East)
- Head coach: Susan Robinson Fruchtl (3rd season)
- Assistant coaches: Dan Durkin (3rd season); Dana Eikenberg (1st season); Dario Hernandez (3rd season)
- Home arena: Alumni Hall

2014–15 Big East Conference women's basketball standings
	Conf.				Overall
Team	W		L	PCT	W		L	PCT
Seton Hall *	15	–	3	.833	28	–	6	.824
DePaul †	15	–	3	.833	27	–	8	.771
Villanova	12	–	6	.667	22	–	14	.611
St. John's	11	–	7	.611	23	–	11	.676
Creighton	10	–	8	.556	17	–	14	.548
Butler	10	–	8	.556	14	–	16	.467
Xavier	8	–	10	.444	18	–	14	.563
Marquette	4	–	14	.222	9	–	22	.290
Providence	3	–	15	.167	6	–	24	.200
Georgetown	2	–	16	.111	4	–	27	.129
† 2015 Big East Basketball Tournament winner * Tournament #1 seed As of March 29, 2015; Rankings from AP poll

The 2014–15 Providence Friars women's basketball team represented Providence College in the 2014–15 college basketball season. The Friars were led by third year head coach Susan Robinson Fruchtl and were members of the Big East Conference. The Friars played their home games at Alumni Hall. They finished the season 6–24, 3–15 in Big East play to finish in ninth place. They lost in the first round of the Big East women's tournament to Marquette.

== Roster ==
2014–15 Providence Friars women's basketball team
Players
Coaches

Pos.	#	Name	Height	Year	Previous school	Hometown
G	0	Sarah Beal	5 ft 8 in (1.73 m)	So	New Hope Christian Academy	Matthews, NC
F	1	Alise Parker	6 ft 1 in (1.85 m)	Fr	Houston	Germantown, TN
G	13	Tori Rule	5 ft 8 in (1.73 m)	Sr	Minneapolis South	Minneapolis, MN
G	14	Miranda Simpson	5 ft 10 in (1.78 m)	So	Stony Point	Roucd Rock, TX
F	15	Chanise Baldwin	6 ft 3 in (1.91 m)	Sr	Detroit Martin Luther King	Pontiac, MI
G	21	Karin Robinson	5 ft 7 in (1.7 m)	Sr	Mary Louis Academy; Monroe CC	Jamaica, NY
F	22	Aliyah Miller	6 ft 1 in (1.85 m)	So	Southaven	Southaven, MS
F	25	Brianna Frias	6 ft 3 in (1.91 m)	Fr	Holy Name Central	Worcester, MA
F	30	Eva Iiskola	6 ft 0 in (1.83 m)	Jr	Makelanrinne	Espoo, Finland
F	32	Annie Russian	6 ft 0 in (1.83 m)	Sr	Round Rock	Round Rock, TX
F	42	Alexis Harris	6 ft 2 in (1.88 m)	Sr	Renaissance	Detroit, MI
G	44	Alison Lewis	5 ft 11 in (1.8 m)	Fr	Sanford	Kennett Square, PA

Head coach

- Susan Robinson Fruchtl (Penn State)

Assistant coach(es)

- Dan Durkin (Mount St. Mary's)
- Dana Eikenberg (Penn State)
- Dario Hernandez (Shaw)

Legend

- (C) Team captain
- (S) Suspended
- (I) Ineligible
- (W) Walk-on
- Injured
- Current redshirt

Roster
Last update: 4 August 2014

== Schedule ==
Date time, TV	Rank^{#}	Opponent^{#}	Result	Record	Site (attendance) city, state
Regular Season
11/14/2014*; 4:00 pm		at Richmond	L 59–75	0–1	Robins Center (561); Richmond, VA
11/18/2014*; 7:00 pm		Brown; Ocean State Cup	W 78–69	1–1	Alumni Hall (327); Providence, RI
11/20/2014*; 7:00 pm		at Hartford	L 54–57	1–2	Chase Arena at Reich Family Pavilion (1,803); West Hartford, CT
11/23/2014*; 1:00 pm, BEDN		Virginia Tech	L 69–72	1–3	Alumni Hall (282); Providence, RI
11/26/2014*; 7:00 pm		at Dayton	L 56–72	1–4	UD Arena (2,026); Dayton, OH
11/30/2014*; 1:00 pm		at Bryant; Ocean State Cup	L 80–90	1–5	Chace Athletic Center (172); Smithfield, RI
12/03/2014; 12:00 pm, BEDN		Villanova	W 51–49	2–5 (1–0)	Alumni Hall (1,685); Providence, RI
12/06/2014*; 12:00 pm		UMass Lowell	W 66–54	3–5	Alumni Hall (347); Providence, RI
12/07/2014*; 2:00 pm		Rhode Island; Ocean State Cup	L 56–63	3–6	Alumni Hall (241); Providence, RI
12/11/2014*; 7:05 pm, ESPN3		at Florida Gulf Coast	L 58–68	3–7	Alico Arena (1,503); Fort Myers, FL
12/21/2014*; 1:00 pm		Duquesne	W 67–56	4–7	Alumni Hall (324); Providence, RI
12/28/2014*; 1:00 pm		at Boston College	L 51–79	4–8	Conte Forum (847); Chestnut Hill, MA
12/30/2014; 2:00 pm		St. John's	L 52–68	4–9 (1–1)	Alumni Hall (341); Providence, RI
01/02/2015; 2:00 pm		at Butler	L 61–66	4–10 (1–2)	Hinkle Fieldhouse (463); Indianapolis, IN
01/04/2015; 2:00 pm		at Xavier	L 49–71	4–11 (1–3)	Cintas Center (991); Cincinnati, OH
01/09/2015; 7:00 pm		at Georgetown	L 61–69	4–12 (1–4)	McDonough Gymnasium (401); Washington, D.C.
01/11/2015; 1:00 pm		Seton Hall	L 67–68	4–13 (1–5)	Alumni Hall (339); Providence, RI
01/16/2015; 8:00 pm, FS1		Creighton	L 54–65	4–14 (1–6)	Alumni Hall (706); Providence, RI
01/23/2015; 8:00 pm		at Marquette	W 66–58	5–14 (2–6)	Al McGuire Center (892); Milwaukee, WI
01/25/2015; 3:00 pm		at DePaul	L 42–90	5–15 (2–7)	McGrath-Phillips Arena (2,312); Chicago, IL
01/30/2015; 7:00 pm		Butler	L 59–67	5–16 (2–8)	Alumni Hall (242); Providence, RI
02/01/2015; 1:00 pm		Xavier	L 57–68	5–17 (2–9)	Alumni Hall (177); Providence, RI
02/06/2015; 8:00 pm, FS1		at Seton Hall	L 40–67	5–18 (2–10)	Walsh Gymnasium (1,146); South Orange, NJ
02/08/2015; 2:00 pm, ESPN3		at St. John's	L 49–70	5–19 (2–11)	Carnesecca Arena (1,008); Queens, NY
02/15/2015; 2:00 pm, BEDN		at Creighton	L 57–84	5–20 (2–12)	D. J. Sokol Arena (1,412); Omaha, NE
02/20/2015; 7:00 pm		Marquette	L 64–72	5–21 (2–13)	Alumni Hall (231); Providence, RI
02/22/2015; 1:00 pm, BEDN		DePaul	L 66–103	5–22 (2–14)	Alumni Hall (356); Providence, RI
02/27/2015; 8:30 pm, FS1		at Villanova	W 81–72	5–23 (2–15)	The Pavilion (841); Villanova, PA
03/01/2015; 1:00 pm		Georgetown	W 81–66	6–23 (3–15)	Alumni Hall (696); Providence, RI
Big East Women's Tournament
03/07/2015; 3:00 pm, BEDN		vs. Marquette; First Round	L 75–78	6–24	Allstate Arena (N/A); Rosemont, IL
*Non-conference game. ^{#}Rankings from AP Poll. (#) Tournament seedings in parentheses. All times are in Eastern.
