= 2015 Big East women's basketball tournament =

Women's Basketball Tournament

- Classification: Division I
- Season: 2014–15
- Teams: 10
- Site: Allstate Arena; Rosemont, IL
- Champions: DePaul (2nd title)
- Winning coach: Doug Bruno (2nd title)
- MVP: Megan Podkowa (DePaul)
- Television: FS1

2014–15 Big East Conference women's basketball standings
	Conf.				Overall
Team	W		L	PCT	W		L	PCT
Seton Hall *	15	–	3	.833	28	–	6	.824
DePaul †	15	–	3	.833	27	–	8	.771
Villanova	12	–	6	.667	22	–	14	.611
St. John's	11	–	7	.611	23	–	11	.676
Creighton	10	–	8	.556	17	–	14	.548
Butler	10	–	8	.556	14	–	16	.467
Xavier	8	–	10	.444	18	–	14	.563
Marquette	4	–	14	.222	9	–	22	.290
Providence	3	–	15	.167	6	–	24	.200
Georgetown	2	–	16	.111	4	–	27	.129
† 2015 Big East Basketball Tournament winner * Tournament #1 seed As of March 29, 2015; Rankings from AP poll

The 2015 Big East women's basketball tournament, officially known as the 2015 Big East Championship, was a tournament March 7–10, 2015, at Allstate Arena in the Chicago suburb of Rosemont, Illinois.

== Seeds ==
2014 Big East women's basketball tournament seeds and results
Seed	School	Conf.	Over.	Tiebreaker
1	Seton Hall ^{‡}	15–3	28–5	2–0 vs. DePaul
2	DePaul ^{†}	15–3	26–7	0–2 vs. Seton Hall
3	Villanova ^{†}	12–6	19–13	
4	St. John's ^{†}	11–7	21–10	
5	Creighton ^{†}	10–8	17–13	1–1 vs. Seton Hall
6	Butler ^{†}	10–8	14–16	0–2 vs. Seton Hall
7	Xavier	8–10	17–14	
8	Marquette	4–14	9–22	
9	Providence	3–15	6–24	
10	Georgetown	2–16	4–27	
‡ – Big East regular season champions, and tournament No. 1 seed. † – Received a single-bye in the conference tournament. Overall records include all games played in the Big East tournament.

== Schedule ==
Game	Time*	Matchup^{#}	Television	Attendance
First round – Saturday, March 7
1	2:00 PM	#8 Marquette vs #9 Providence	BEDN	2,115
2	4:30 PM	#7 Xavier vs #10 Georgetown	BEDN	2,115
Quarterfinals – Sunday, March 8
3	Noon	#1 Seton Hall vs #8 Marquette	FS2	1,873
4	2:30 PM	#4 St. John's vs #5 Creighton	FS2	1,873
5	6:00 PM	#2 DePaul vs #7 Xavier	FS2	
6	8:30 PM	#3 Villanova vs #6 Butler	FS2	
Semifinals – Monday, March 9
7	5:30 PM	#1 Seton Hall vs #4 St. John's	FS1	2,302
8	8:00 PM	#2 DePaul vs #3 Villanova	FS2	2,302
Championship – Tuesday, March 10
9	7:00 PM	#1 Seton Hall vs. #2 DePaul	FS1	3,226
*Game Times in CT. #–Rankings denote tournament seed

== Bracket ==
First round March 7, 2015
8	Marquette	78
9	Providence	75
7	Xavier	70
10	Georgetown	67

Quarterfinals; March 8, 2015
1	Seton Hall	77
8	Marquette	51
4	St. John's	57
5	Creighton	54
2	DePaul	87
7	Xavier	53
3	Villanova	70
6	Butler	49

Semifinals; March 9, 2015
1	Seton Hall	72
4	St. John's	60
2	DePaul	58
3	Villanova	55

Championship; March 10, 2015
1	Seton Hall	68
2	DePaul	78

== See also ==
2015 Big East men's basketball tournament
