= Jason Goff =

Sports journalist

Jason Goff was an anchor for Chicago Sports Network hosting Chicago Bulls live pre- and postgame coverage.He also hosts the Chicago sports-focused podcast "The Full Go" with The Ringer. Goff previously worked at NBC Sports Chicago hosting Chicago Bulls live pre-and postgame coverage from 2019 until the network ceased operations in 2024.

Along with his work on-air, Goff hosted the Bulls Talk Podcast for NBC Sports Chicago, featuring interviews, news and discussions regarding the team with Insider K.C. Johnson and reporter Rob Schaefer.

Prior to joining NBC Sports Chicago, Goff worked for 670 The Score as a producer after graduating from Southern Illinois University Carbondale in 2000. In 2007, Goff was named producer of WSCR's "The Boers and Bernstein Show." In 2012, Goff left Chicago and joined WZGC 92.9 The Game in Atlanta as a "full-time evening host, along with handling pre/postgame hosting duties on the Atlanta Hawks Radio Network.". Goff also hosted a midday show on SiriusXM NBA Radio.

Goff returned to Chicago in 2014 and continued to serve as a host for SiriusXM NBA Radio and Bleacher Report on SiriusXM. In 2015, Goff returned to 670 The Score as a co-host of a midday show with Matt Spiegel, titled "The Spiegel and Goff Show." Goff later reunited with Bernstein in the afternoons for "The Bernstein and Goff Show."

Goff has also hosted for SiriusXM Big Ten Radio and ESPN Radio on “The Spain and Company Show” featuring host Sarah Spain, and the “GTL Show” featuring Goff, Taylor Twellman and Rachel Lindsay.

In March 2018, 670 The Score parted ways with Goff.

In September 2021, Goff launched a new podcast called "The Full Go" with The Ringer.

Goff is an Evanston, Illinois native and attended Evanston Township High School.

Goff also has his own command on Twitch for @chicago670thescore, which states "When I'm on, the ratings go up."
