= NBC Sports Chicago =

American regional sports network

- Country: United States
- Broadcast area: Illinois outside the St. Louis metro; Northwest Indiana; Iowa; Extreme southern Wisconsin; Kenosha, Racine, Walworth, Rock, Green & portions of Dane counties); Michiana; National (via satellite)
- Network: NBC Sports Regional Networks
- Headquarters: Chicago, Illinois

Programming
- Language: English
- Picture format: 1080i (HDTV)

Ownership
- Owner: NBC Sports Group (25%); Jerry Reinsdorf (25%/25% split between interests in Bulls and White Sox); Wirtz Corporation (25%)
- Sister channels: Broadcast: WMAQ-TV/Chicago; WSNS-TV/Chicago

History
- Launched: October 1, 2004; 22 years ago
- Replaced: Fox Sports Net Chicago (de facto)
- Closed: September 30, 2024; 2 years ago
- Replaced by: Chicago Sports Network (de facto)
- Former names: Comcast SportsNet Chicago (2004–2017)

NBC Sports Chicago (formerly Comcast SportsNet Chicago) was an American regional sports network that broadcast regional coverage of professional sports teams in the Chicago metropolitan area, as well as college sports events and original sports-related news, discussion and entertainment programming. It was branded as part of the NBC Sports Regional Networks. The channel ceased operations on September 30, 2024.

NBC Sports Chicago was owned by a consortium of Comcast (which owned 25% through the NBC Sports Group unit of NBCUniversal), Chicago Bulls and White Sox owner Jerry Reinsdorf (who owned a 50% majority interest), and the Wirtz Corporation, owner of the Chicago Blackhawks (which owned 25%). The Chicago Cubs, through the Tribune Company and later the family of J. Joseph Ricketts, formerly owned a 20% stake in the network from its launch until the Cubs ended their broadcasts on the network after the end of the 2019 season, with that percentage distributed to the remaining partners after that point.

In May 2024, the Bulls, Blackhawks, and White Sox decided to move to a new network, named Chicago Sports Network, run by Standard Media Group, effective October 1, 2024 (the start of the 2024-25 NBA and NHL seasons). After NBC Sports Chicago ended broadcasting operations, most of its channel positions, social media presences and existing followers, transferred to CHSN. Several on-air personalities were hired by CHSN as well.

The network's main studios and offices were located at 350 North Orleans Street, inside the River North Point Center in the Near North Side area. The channel was available on cable and fiber optic television providers in most of Illinois, and throughout northwest Indiana, Iowa, Kenosha County, Wisconsin and southwest Michigan and nationwide on satellite provider DirecTV.

== History ==
In November 2003, Jerry Reinsdorf, Bill Wirtz, and the Tribune Company decided to end their cable television agreements for the Bulls, White Sox, Cubs, and Blackhawks with FSN Chicago, stripping that network of broadcast rights to all of the professional sports teams in the Chicago area. All three team owners decided to enter into a partnership with Comcast to form a new regional sports network, to be named Comcast SportsNet Chicago, whose launch was formally announced on December 2. CSN Chicago was created in order for the four teams to have editorial control over their broadcasts, although the network continued to share the rights to the Cubs, White Sox, Blackhawks and Bulls with WGN-TV (channel 9, which was owned by Tribune) and (until 2014) WCIU-TV (channel 26).

Comcast SportsNet Chicago launched on October 1, 2004. At that time, with the loss of all four teams from its lineup, FSN Chicago was effectively left with only events from some minor local and semi-professional teams, national programming from Fox Sports Net, and Midwestern outdoors programs on its schedule; many cable and satellite providers in northeastern Illinois and northwest Indiana also chose to replace FSN Chicago with CSN Chicago upon its launch.

After Rainbow Media shut down FSN Chicago on June 23, 2006, Comcast SportsNet Chicago acquired the regional cable television rights to broadcast sports events, discussion and entertainment programs intended for national distribution to the Fox Sports regional networks. The network subsequently relocated its operations into FSN Chicago's former studio facilities on Orleans Street (which NBC Sports Chicago now also shares with the offices of the Chicago Sun-Times).

On April 2, 2007, the Tribune Company announced its intent to sell its shares in both Comcast SportsNet Chicago and the Chicago Cubs as part of the company's $8.2 billion purchase by real estate magnate Sam Zell.

After inheriting the team from father Bill Wirtz upon his death in September 2007, new Chicago Blackhawks owner Rocky Wirtz decided to lift his father's years-long ban on local televised coverage of the team's home games (which the elder Wirtz imposed as a means to sustain ticket sales). On March 30, 2008, the Blackhawks announced a new broadcasting rights agreement. The team renewed CSN Chicago's broadcast rights (with the network carrying the bulk of the games), while local broadcasts were split between CSN Chicago and WGN-TV effective with the 2008–09 season; all of the team's games (both home and away) would be televised in high definition (due to the NHL's broadcast contracts, WGN-TV was barred from carrying its share of Blackhawks telecasts on its former national superstation feed WGN America, although its game telecasts were available in Canada through the station's carriage as a superstation on domestic cable and satellite providers).

Comcast SportsNet Chicago, along with the other Comcast SportsNet-branded networks, implemented a new network logo style (utilizing Comcast's then-universal revised corporate typeface) and graphics package on October 1, 2008.

On January 5, 2009, the network premiered Monsters in the Morning, a weekday morning talk show hosted by former WSCR radio host Mike North and Comcast SportsNet Chicago reporter and former Chicago Bear Dan Jiggetts. The program was cancelled in January 2010, due to problems involving the show, including the program's main sponsor, the now-defunct online sports channel ChicagoSportsWebio.com, being implicated in defrauding North, Jiggetts and others in a money laundering scheme in June 2009; North subsequently became the host of Monsters and Money in the Morning, a short-lived program for CBS owned-and-operated station WBBM-TV (channel 2), which briefly replaced that station's morning newscast.

On August 21, 2009, the Tribune Company sold its interests in the Chicago Cubs, Wrigley Field and 25% of Comcast SportsNet Chicago to the family of TD Ameritrade founder J. Joseph Ricketts for $845 million.

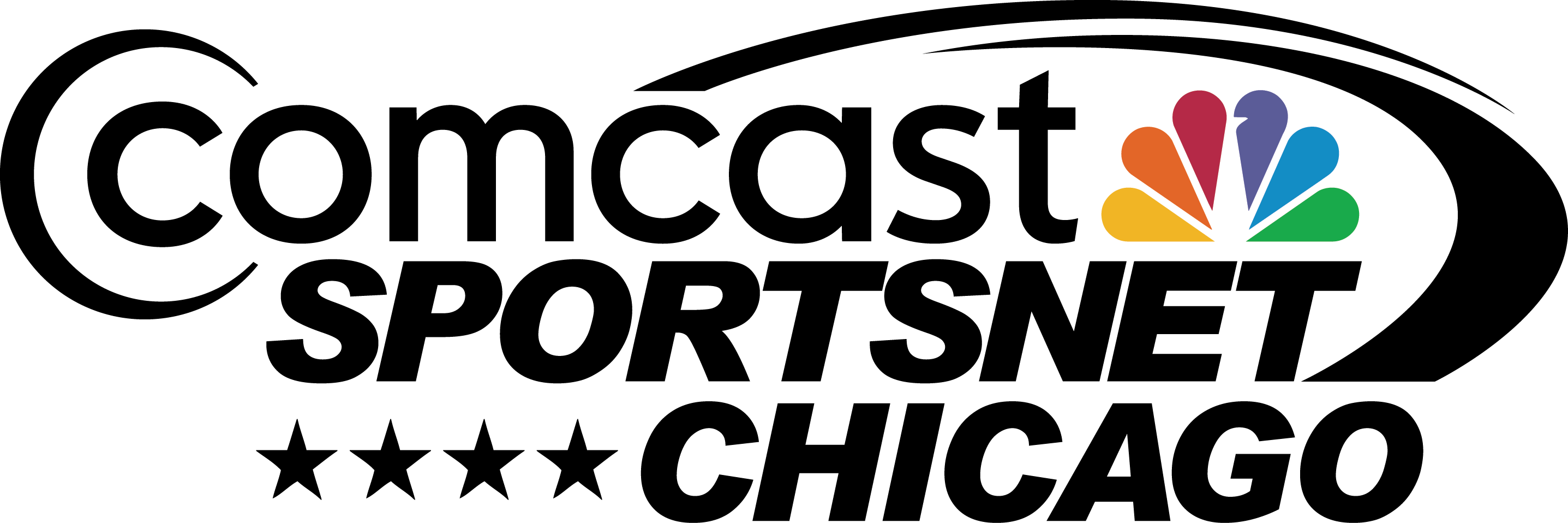
Comcast SportsNet Chicago logo from September 2012 until 2016

With Comcast's acquisition of NBC Universal (owners of NBC and Telemundo owned and operated duopoly stations WMAQ-TV and WSNS-TV) on January 28, 2011, Comcast SportsNet was also integrated into the new NBC Sports Group unit, culminating with the addition of the peacock logo in September 2012 and an updated graphics package based on that introduced by NBC Sports for its NBC and national cable broadcasts in January 2013. The updated graphics were implemented on CSN's live game coverage and all studio shows, with the exception of SportsNet Central.

In September 2012, Comcast SportsNet Chicago and its sister Comcast SportsNet outlets ceased carrying Fox Sports Networks-supplied programming, after failing to reach an agreement to continue carrying FSN's nationally distributed programs. SportsNet Central would ultimately implement a new on-air look of its own and on April 14, 2014, in conjunction with that change, the program switched to the updated graphics package introduced three years earlier.

On October 2, 2017, the network was rebranded as NBC Sports Chicago, as part of a larger rebranding of the Comcast SportsNet networks under the NBC Sports brand.

On January 2, 2019, the White Sox, Bulls, and Blackhawks agreed to an exclusive five-year deal with NBC Sports Chicago beginning in the fall of 2019, ending their broadcasts on WGN-TV. The Cubs, with the 2020 launch of the team-owned Marquee Sports Network, moved their games to that cable channel after 15 years with the network ending with the 2019 season.

In April 2019, the network acquired regional rights to the Chicago Red Stars of the National Women's Soccer League.

On October 1, 2019 Dish dropped NBC Sports Chicago from both its satellite service and its streaming service Sling.

In July 2021, it was announced that the Sinclair Broadcast Group (part owner of Marquee Sports Network and owners of the Bally Sports Regional Networks) was considering buying the entire NBC Sports Regional Networks unit from Comcast. The sale never occurred.

In May 2024, the Bulls, Blackhawks, and White Sox decided to move to a new network, named Chicago Sports Network, run by Standard Media Group, when the five-year deal that was signed in 2019 to expire on September 30, 2024.

On September 30, 2024, NBC Sports Chicago ceased operations at 11:59 p.m., after airing reruns of various special programs (including Chicago's past championship parades, the premieres of Sportsnite and Chicago Tribune Live, and the network's 20th anniversary special in repetition). The network went dark following a PSA for The Nature Conservancy before putting up a screensaver placeholder saying that the channel "is no longer in service". The former network was ultimately replaced by the Chicago Sports Network several hours later.

== Programming ==
=== Sports coverage ===
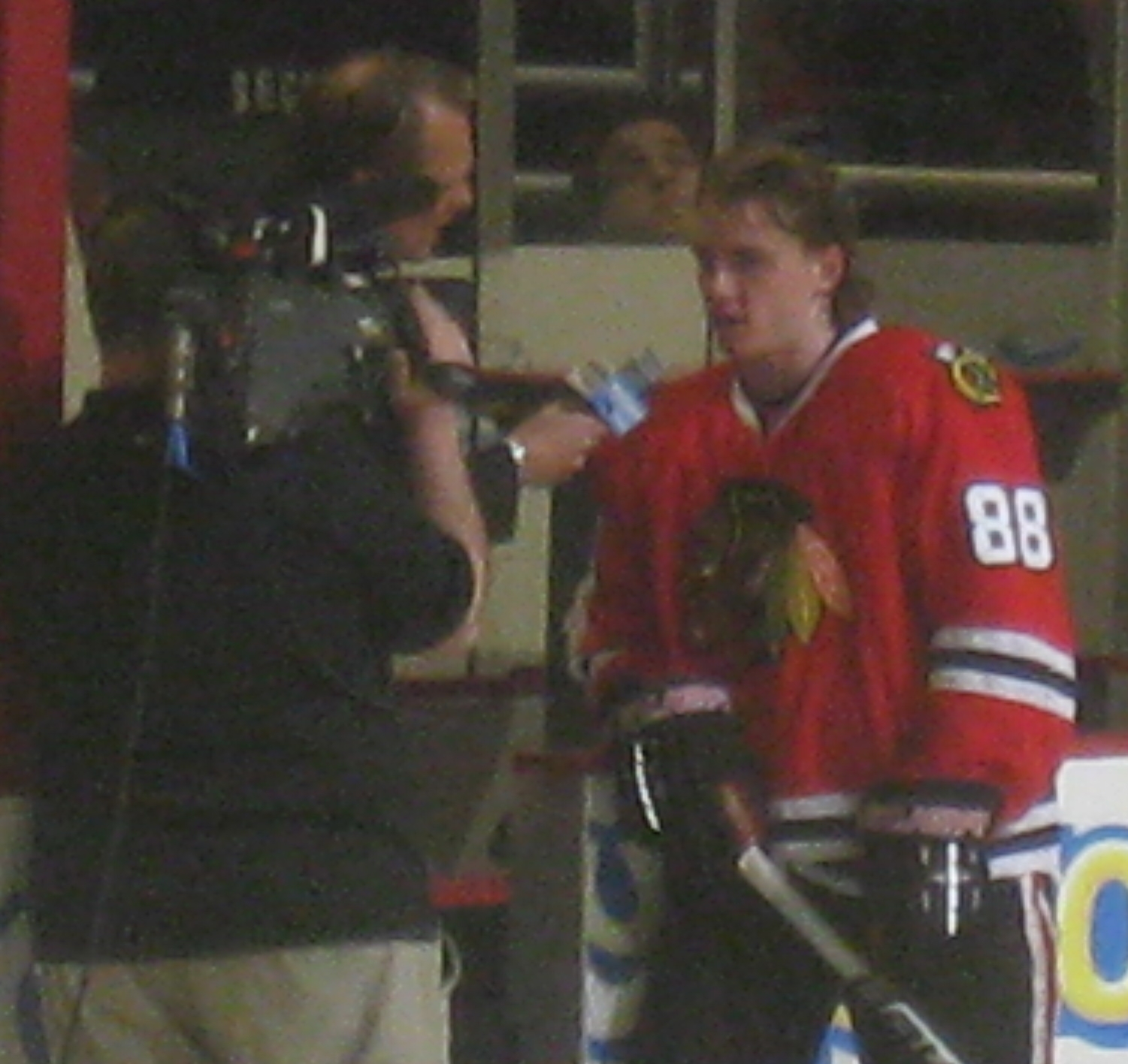
Patrick Kane being interviewed by Comcast SportsNet Chicago

Through its co-ownership by the owners of each of the three teams, NBC Sports Chicago held the regional cable television rights to air a majority of games involving the Chicago White Sox Major League Baseball club, the NBA's Chicago Bulls and the NHL's Chicago Blackhawks until October 1, 2024 when the teams moved games to Chicago Sports Network (CHSN), which they also co-owned.

The channel aired a postgame show after every Chicago Bears game named "Football Aftershow" due to Marquee being the official cable partner of the Chicago Bears.

The channel had held the broadcast rights to games of the now-defunct Chicago Rush of the Arena Football League.

On April 13, 2010, then-named CSN Chicago announced that it had signed a contract with Chicago Fire S.C. to broadcast at least eight of the franchise's matches for the 2010 season. This agreement continued for the 2011 and 2012 seasons as well. On January 26, 2015, the network signed a three-year contract with the team to become its exclusive local television broadcaster, ending the team's previous two-year deal with WPWR-TV. In 2018, the Chicago Fire left the channel for ESPN+.

The network also carried collegiate sports events including Loyola Chicago men’s and women’s basketball and a package of Missouri Valley Conference basketball games, including the first round and quarterfinals of Arch Madness, syndicated by Bally Sports Midwest. Prior to the termination of Comcast SportsNet's groupwide programming agreement with Fox Sports Networks, CSN Chicago additionally broadcast FSN's national programming following the shutdown of FSN Chicago, notably including the network's college sports coverage, such as Atlantic Coast Conference men's and women's basketball games (on Sundays), men's basketball games from the Pac-12 Conference (on various nights) and college football games from the Big 12 Conference and Pac-12 Conference (on Saturdays during the fall).

From 2016-2019, CSN Chicago obtained the exclusive rights to championship games for the Iowa High School Athletic Association in football, basketball and wrestling, replacing the previous model of a statewide broadcast network in Iowa of stations in each market.

=== Other programming ===
NBC Sports Chicago's flagship program was SportsNet Central, a nightly sports news program featuring live reports and coverage on the Chicago area's major sports teams as well as game highlights from local and national teams. The program also featured special regular segments such as "Luke-A-Likes," a popular segment hosted by Luke Stuckmeyer on nights when he hosted the program before his October 2019 departure. It was a viewer-voting segment featuring photos submitted by viewers claiming to resemble a particular sports figure) and the "Chicago Sports Trivia Question" (a bumper segment shown before and after a commercial break featuring trivia questions related to Chicago sports.

The network also carries team magazine and coaches shows focusing on the Bulls, Blackhawks and White Sox, as well as the Northern Illinois University and Illinois State University football and basketball teams. It continued to carry unofficial Cubs coverage with the start of the 2020 MLB season.

==== CSN Chicago Sports Awards ====
Since the network launched in 2004, NBC Sports Chicago has hosted the CSN Chicago Sports Awards, an annual award show to raise money for the March of Dimes (this program dates back to 1987, when the children's charity started the benefit in partnership with SportsChannel Chicago, the later FSN Chicago). The honorees included top athletes from Chicago's professional sports teams, who were chosen based on their contributions to their teams and the Chicago community. To date, the "CSN Chicago Sports Awards" has raised over $6 million for the March of Dimes.

== NBC Sports Chicago staff ==
=== On-air talent and journalists ===
- Pat Boyle
- Chuck Garfien
- Gail Fischer
- Luke Stuckmeyer
- David Haugh
- Jason Goff
- Mark Schanowski
- Dan Jiggetts
- Sarah Kustok
- Leila Rahimi

== Related services ==
=== NBC Sports Chicago Plus ===
NBC Sports Chicago Plus was the secondary feed used to resolve scheduling conflicts when two teams played at the same time, with a tertiary network, NBC Sports Chicago Plus 2', activated occasionally when it had all four teams in play. The extra channels also carried alternate content from NBC Sports or formerly, FSN. The channel originated as a looping help service for Comcast services otherwise, and was originally allocated for the defunct HD-only channel MOJO HD. Before digital cable services were expanded, the Plus channels aired part-time, temporarily replacing networks such as CLTV or C-SPAN2 when necessary.

== See also ==
- Comcast Network – a Chicago-based general entertainment channel; the network formerly carried a full schedule of American Hockey League games from the Chicago Wolves.
