= D. J. Sokol Arena =

Multi-purpose student recreational facility in Omaha, Nebraska, U.S.

- Interactive map of D. J. Sokol Arena
- Full name: D. J. Sokol Arena
- Location: Omaha, Nebraska
- Coordinates: 41.266146°N 95.940471°W
- Owner: Creighton University
- Operator: Creighton University
- Capacity: approx 3,000
- Public transit: Metro Transit

Construction
- Opened: August 28, 2009
- Cost: $19 million

Tenants
- Creighton Bluejays: Women's Basketball; Women's Volleyball

D. J. Sokol Arena is a multi-purpose student recreational facility in Omaha, Nebraska. It was opened on August 28, 2009. It currently hosts the Creighton Bluejays women's basketball and volleyball teams. It has a seating capacity of approximately 3,000 spectators.

== History ==
More than 182,000 bricks, 654 tons of steel and 30 miles of electrical wire were used during construction, which employed up to 115 workers at one time.The height of the roof ridge is 78’-10” above the arena floor, with a ceiling fan measuring 20 feet in diameter spinning high above the playing surface.

In 2018, the volleyball team received an upgraded playing court. The court was installed in time for the September 21st match vs Depaul. The court was updated again in 2025.

DJ Sokol Arena has also received updated LED lighting, an expanded scoreboard on the north wall, and digital video boards on the southeast and southwest walls.

== Events ==
DJ Sokol Arena has hosted eight volleyball conference championships (2009, 2013, 2015, 2018, 2020, 2022, 2024, and 2026), and hosted the first and second rounds of the NCAA Women's Volleyball tournament on seven different occasions (2017, 2018, 2021, 2022, 2023, 2024, and 2025).

DJ Sokol Arena was one of the sites for The Basketball Tournament in 2022.

The arena also hosts other events including commencement ceremonies, concerts, and conferences.

== See also ==
- List of NCAA Division I basketball arenas
