= 2018–19 Colgate Raiders women's basketball team =

Intercollegiate basketball season

2018–19 Colgate Raiders women's basketball
- Conference: Patriot League
- Record: 12–17 (8–10 Patriot)
- Head coach: Bill Cleary (3rd season)
- Assistant coaches: Lauren Ellis; Candice Green; Katie Curtis
- Home arena: Cotterell Court

2018–19 Patriot League women's basketball standings
	Conf.				Overall
Team	W		L	PCT	W		L	PCT
Bucknell †	16	–	2	.889	28	–	6	.824
American	16	–	2	.889	22	–	11	.667
Lehigh	12	–	6	.667	21	–	10	.677
Boston University	11	–	7	.611	15	–	14	.517
Holy Cross	9	–	9	.500	18	–	13	.581
Colgate	8	–	10	.444	12	–	17	.414
Army	6	–	12	.333	11	–	19	.367
Navy	5	–	13	.278	10	–	19	.345
Loyola (MD)	5	–	13	.278	7	–	24	.226
Lafayette	2	–	16	.111	8	–	23	.258
† 2019 Patriot League tournament winner As of March 22, 2019; Rankings from AP poll

The 2018–19 Colgate Raiders women's basketball team represented Colgate University during the 2018–19 NCAA Division I women's basketball season. The Raiders, led by third year head coach Bill Cleary, played their home games at Cotterell Court and were members of the Patriot League. They finished the season 12–17, 8–10 in Patriot League play to finish in sixth place. They lost in the quarterfinals of the Patriot League women's tournament to Lehigh.

== Roster ==
2018–19 Colgate Raiders women's basketball team
Players
Coaches

Pos.	#	Name	Height	Year	Previous school	Hometown
F	0	Mylah Chandler	5 ft 10 in (1.78 m)	Sr	Albany	Albany, NY
G	2	Tegan Graham (C)	5 ft 11 in (1.8 m)	Jr	Wellington Girls' College	Wellington, New Zealand
G	3	Nia Ahart	5 ft 7 in (1.7 m)	So	University Liggett School	Detroit, MI
G	4	Mackenzie Carroll	5 ft 9 in (1.75 m)	Sr	Central Bucks HS West	New Britain, PA
F	5	Chelsey Koren	5 ft 10 in (1.78 m)	Sr	Blairsville	Blairsville, PA
G	13	Keelah Dixon	5 ft 5 in (1.65 m)	So	Braintree	Braintree, MA
G	14	Rachel Thompson	5 ft 10 in (1.78 m)	Jr	Mary Institute and St. Louis Country Day	St. Louis, MO
G	15	Haley Greer	5 ft 10 in (1.78 m)	Jr	New Trier	Winnetka, IL
G	21	Ava Williams	5 ft 9 in (1.75 m)	Fr	Presentation	San Jose, CA
F	22	Abby Schubiger	6 ft 1 in (1.85 m)	Jr	Morristown	Morristown, NJ
G	23	Taylor Langan	5 ft 10 in (1.78 m)	Fr	Jefferson Township	Lake Hopatcong, NJ
G	30	Katlyn Ghavidel	5 ft 6 in (1.68 m)	Fr	Boerne-Samuel V. Champion	Boerne, TX
F	31	Alexa Naessens	6 ft 1 in (1.85 m)	Fr	Germantown Academy	Fort Washington, PA
F	40	Summer King (C)	6 ft 1 in (1.85 m)	Sr	Walpole	Walpole, MA

Head coach

- Bill Cleary (Villanova)

Assistant coach(es)

- Lauren Ellis (Bloomsburg)
- Candice Green (Colgate)
- Katie Curtis (Colgate)

Legend

- (C) Team captain
- (S) Suspended
- (I) Ineligible
- (W) Walk-on
- Injured
- Current redshirt

Roster

== Schedule ==
Date time, TV	Rank^{#}	Opponent^{#}	Result	Record	Site (attendance) city, state
Non-conference regular season
Nov 6, 2018*; 6:00 pm, ESPN+		at Yale	L 61–80	0–1	John J. Lee Amphitheater (301); New Haven, CT
Nov 9, 2018*; 11:00 am, ESPN+		at Dayton	L 58–67	0–2	UD Arena (8,811); Dayton, OH
Nov 15, 2018*; 6:00 pm		Cornell	Postponed		Cotterell Court; Hamilton, NY
Nov 18, 2018*; 2:00 pm, ESPN+		at George Mason	L 61–64	0–3	EagleBank Arena (688); Fairfax, VA
Nov 21, 2018*; 7:00 pm		Canisius	W 67–53	1–3	Cotterell Court (202); Hamilton, NY
Nov 25, 2018*; 2:00 pm		Columbia	W 84–71	2–3	Cotterell Court (214); Hamilton, NY
Nov 29, 2018*; 7:00 pm		at Siena	L 53–55	2–4	Alumni Recreation Center (478); Loudonville, NY
Dec 2, 2018*; 2:00 pm		Fairleigh Dickinson	W 71–52	3–4	Cotterell Court (222); Hamilton, NY
Dec 5, 2018*; 7:00 pm, ESPN+		at UMass Lowell	W 61–52	4–4	Costello Athletic Center (822); Lowell, MA
Dec 14, 2018*; 6:00 pm		NJIT	L 53–71	4–5	Cotterell Court (196); Hamilton, NY
Dec 31, 2018*; 6:00 pm		Niagara	L 69–74	4–6	Gallagher Center (303); Lewiston, NY
Patriot League regular season
Jan 3, 2019; 6:00 pm		at Holy Cross	W 70–67	5–6 (1–0)	Hart Center (592); Worcester, MA
Jan 6, 2019; 2:00 pm		at American	L 57–76	5–7 (1–1)	Bender Arena (380); Washington, D.C.
Jan 9, 2019; 12:00 pm		Lafayette	W 60–49	6–7 (2–1)	Cotterell Court (1,574); Hamilton, NY
Jan 12, 2019; 1:00 pm		Navy	L 49–62	6–8 (2–2)	Cotterell Court (224); Hamilton, NY
Jan 16, 2019; 7:00 pm		at Boston University	W 81–72	7–8 (3–2)	Case Gym (319); Boston, MA
Jan 19, 2019; 12:00 pm		Bucknell	L 62–90	7–9 (3–3)	Cotterell Court (263); Hamilton, NY
Jan 23, 2019; 6:00 pm		at Lehigh	L 58–86	7–10 (3–4)	Stabler Arena (464); Bethlehem, PA
Jan 26, 2019; 2:00 pm		Loyola (MD)	W 73–64 ^{OT}	8–10 (4–4)	Cotterell Court (450); Hamilton, NY
Jan 30, 2019; 7:00 pm		at Army	W 70–58	9–10 (5–4)	Christl Arena (407); West Point, NY
Feb 2, 2019; 4:00 pm		American	L 66–71	9–11 (5–5)	Cotterell Court (231); Hamilton, NY
Feb 9, 2019; 4:00 pm		at Navy	L 52–67	9–12 (5–6)	Alumni Hall (609); Annapolis, MD
Feb 13, 2019; 7:00 pm		Boston University	L 53–61	9–13 (5–7)	Cotterell Court (271); Hamilton, NY
Feb 16, 2019; 2:00 pm		at Bucknell	L 58–76	9–14 (5–8)	Sojka Pavilion (850); Lewisburg, PA
Feb 20, 2019; 7:00 pm		Lehigh	L 63–75	9–15 (5–9)	Cotterell Court (217); Hamilton, NY
Feb 23, 2019; 4:00 pm		at Loyola (MD)	W 58–47	10–15 (6–9)	Reitz Arena (319); Baltimore, MD
Feb 27, 2019; 8:30 pm		Army	W 85–80	11–15 (7–9)	Cotterell Court (219); Hamilton, NY
Mar 2, 2019; 2:00 pm		Holy Cross	L 67–80	11–16 (7–10)	Cotterell Court (287); Hamilton, NY
Mar 6, 2019; 7:00 pm		at Lafayette	W 77–67	12–16 (8–10)	Kirby Sports Center (347); Easton, PA
Patriot League Women's Tournament
Mar 11, 2019; 6:00 pm	(6)	at (3) Lehigh; Quarterfinals	L 68–78	12–17	Stabler Arena (535); Bethlehem, PA
*Non-conference game. ^{#}Rankings from AP Poll. (#) Tournament seedings in parentheses. All times are in Eastern Time.

== See also ==
- 2018–19 Colgate Raiders men's basketball team
