= New City Free Library =

Coordinates: 41.15834°N 73.98804°W

The New City Free Library is a library located in New City, New York. Established as a single room in New City School in 1936, it has expanded into a 32,000-square-foot (3,000 m^{2}) facility with over 200,000 volumes.

== History ==
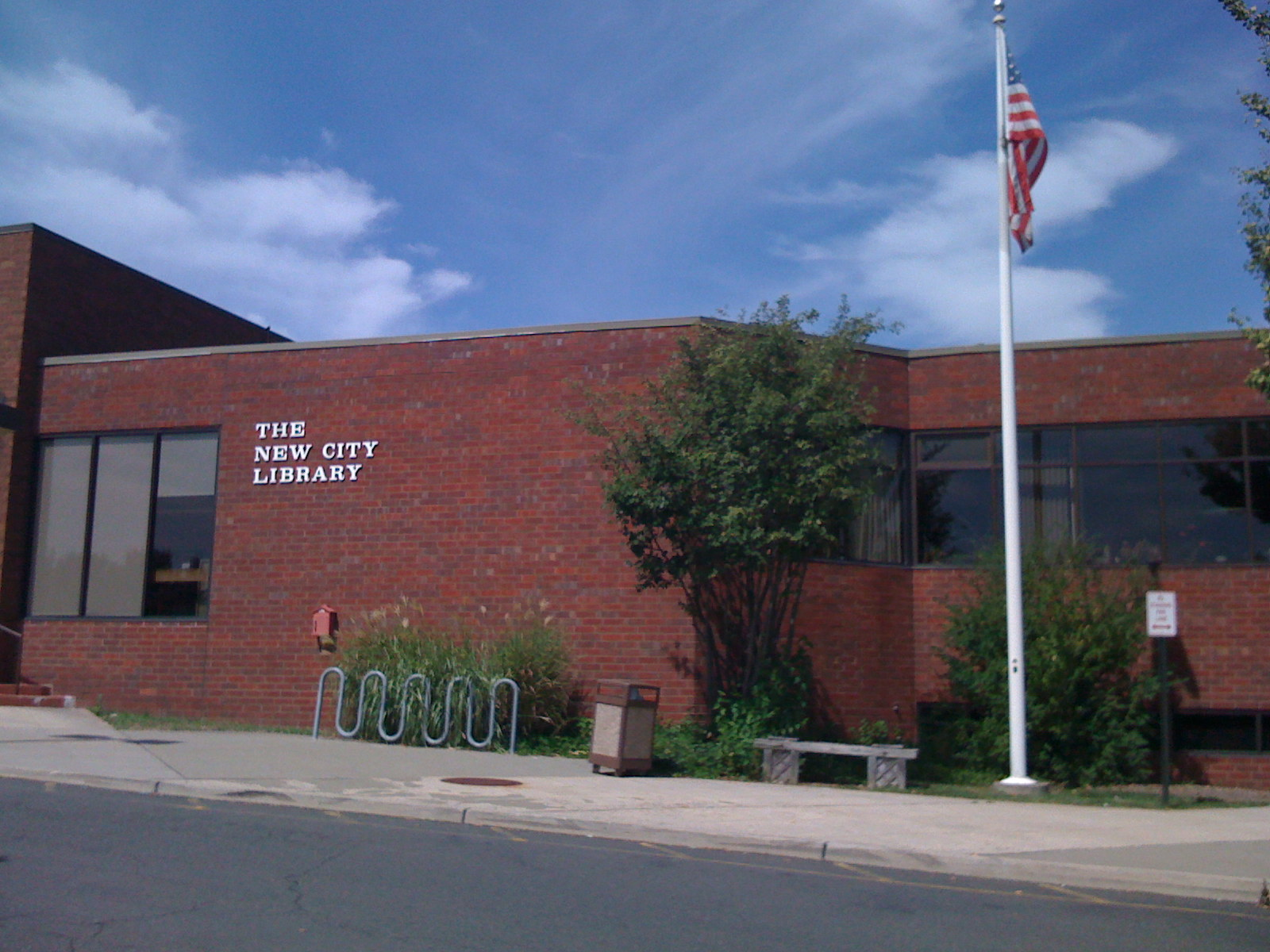
New City Free Library photographed by C.McMorran

The library was officially launched on June 19, 1936, in response to a plan by the New York State Education Department to provide citizens of rural areas with library service. It began as a room in the New City School, opening one afternoon a week, but as the book collection of the library increased, space quickly became a concern. Funding also became a concern, particularly in 1950 when the New City School was no longer able to provide space or finances for the library. With grants and public donations, including a donation of land by the New City Fire Department, the library broke ground on a free-standing building on May 3, 1952. The library opened to the public on July 11, 1953, remaining open for 12 hours each week.

As library membership and book collections continued to grow, the library expanded its hours and staff, also increasing its capacity with the addition of a trailer in the early 1960s. When the New City Fire Department deemed the building safe for occupancy only by 14 patrons at a time in 1965, a vote was held to appropriate sufficient funds for the library to purchase a new location, to which it moved on January 2, 1967. In 1977, the library purchased 3 acres (12,000 m^{2}) of land.

After the budget was approved for the construction of a much larger building in December 2007, ground was broken in November 1978. The new facility contained 20,600 square feet (1,910 m^{2}) as well as a generous allocation for parking for 120 cars. With community support, the library took possession of its new property on January 19, 1980. Over subsequent years, the building has been expanded with 10,700 square feet (990 m^{2}) additional, including a children's wing, a circulation lobby and a basement which houses a technical services department and an audiovisual department. The current facility hosts over 200,000 volumes in 32,000 square feet (3,000 m^{2}).

== Sources ==
- True, Patricia (1970). "The History of the New City Free Library, New City, New York 1936 to 1970" (Manuscript). New City Free Library.
- "The New City Free Library Dedication Ceremony and Program" (Event Program). New City Free Library. 1967.
- "Arriving at the Future" (Pamphlet). New City Library. 2006.
