= Margaret Stone =

Margaret Stone may refer to:

- Margaret Stone (judge) (died 2021), judge of the Federal Court of Australia
- Margaret Stone (swimmer) (1919-2001), Canadian freestyle swimmer
- Margaret M. Barbour Stone (1841–1913), American writer and clubwoman
- Maggie Stone, All My Children character
- Margaret Stone (EastEnders), EastEnders character

== See also ==
- Margaret Stones (1920–2018), Australian botanical illustrator
