= 2018–19 Bucknell Bison women's basketball team =

Intercollegiate basketball season

2018–19 Bucknell Bison women's basketball

Brown University Turkey Tip-Off champions Patriot League regular season co-champions and tournament champions

NCAA women's tournament, first round
- Conference: Patriot League
- Record: 28–6 (16–2 Patriot)
- Head coach: Aaron Roussell (7th season)
- Assistant coaches: Jeanine Radice; Darren Guensch; Brittany Pinkney
- Home arena: Sojka Pavilion

2018–19 Patriot League women's basketball standings
| | Conf. | | | | Overall |
| Team | W | | L | PCT | W | | L | PCT |
|---|---|---|---|---|---|---|---|---|
| Bucknell † | 16 | – | 2 | .889 | 28 | – | 6 | .824 |
| American | 16 | – | 2 | .889 | 22 | – | 11 | .667 |
| Lehigh | 12 | – | 6 | .667 | 21 | – | 10 | .677 |
| Boston University | 11 | – | 7 | .611 | 15 | – | 14 | .517 |
| Holy Cross | 9 | – | 9 | .500 | 18 | – | 13 | .581 |
| Colgate | 8 | – | 10 | .444 | 12 | – | 17 | .414 |
| Army | 6 | – | 12 | .333 | 11 | – | 19 | .367 |
| Navy | 5 | – | 13 | .278 | 10 | – | 19 | .345 |
| Loyola (MD) | 5 | – | 13 | .278 | 7 | – | 24 | .226 |
| Lafayette | 2 | – | 16 | .111 | 8 | – | 23 | .258 |
† 2019 Patriot League tournament winner As of March 22, 2019; Rankings from AP poll

The 2018–19 Bucknell Bison women's basketball team represented Bucknell University during the 2018–19 NCAA Division I women's basketball season. The Bison, led by eighth-year head coach Aaron Roussell, played their home games at Sojka Pavilion in Lewisburg, Pennsylvania, and were members of the Patriot League. Bucknell won the Patriot Conference tournament championship game over American, 66–54 to earn an automatic trip to the NCAA women's tournament. They lost in the first round to Florida State. They finished the season 28–5, 16–2 in Patriot League play, to share the Patriot League regular season title with American. They finished with 28 wins, the most in program history.

At the conclusion of the season, head coach Aaron Roussell left the team to take a coaching job at the University of Richmond. The school went to the Division III ranks for its new hire, naming Scranton's Trevor Woodruff as their new coach on April 26.

== Roster ==
2018–19 Bucknell Bison women's basketball team
Players
Coaches

| Pos. | # | Name | Height | Year | Previous school | Hometown |
|---|---|---|---|---|---|---|
| G | 2 | Kyi English | 5 ft 5 in (1.65 m) | Sr | East Orange | East Orange, NJ |
| F | 3 | Tessa Brugler | 6 ft 1 in (1.85 m) | So | Nazareth | Nazareth, PA |
| G | 4 | Gia Hayes | 5 ft 8 in (1.73 m) | Jr | eStem High Public Charter School | Maumelle, AR |
| G | 11 | Taylor O'Brien | 5 ft 9 in (1.75 m) | Fr | Plymouth Whitemarsh | Lafayette Hill, PA |
| G | 12 | Marly Walls | 5 ft 8 in (1.73 m) | Fr | Nelson County | Bardstown, KY |
| G | 13 | Rachael Dumiak | 5 ft 11 in (1.8 m) | Sr | La Costa Canyon | Carlsbad, CA |
| G | 20 | Kate Walker | 6 ft 0 in (1.83 m) | Sr | Red Oak Community | Red Oak, IA |
| F | 22 | Maegan Mikkelsen | 6 ft 3 in (1.91 m) | Sr | Woodbridge | Woodbridge, VA |
| G | 23 | Ally Johnson | 5 ft 10 in (1.78 m) | So | Beechwood | Fort Mitchell, KY |
| F | 24 | Autumn Ceppi | 6 ft 1 in (1.85 m) | So | Dana Hall | Bedford, MA |
| G | 25 | Abby Kapp | 6 ft 0 in (1.83 m) | So | Boyertown | Barto, PA |
| G | 40 | Ellie Mack | 6 ft 2 in (1.88 m) | Jr | Conestoga | Paoli, PA |
| F | 50 | Kaitlyn Slagus | 6 ft 2 in (1.88 m) | Sr | Belle Vernon | Belle Vernon, PA |

Head coach

- Aaron Roussell (Iowa)

Assistant coach(es)

- Jeanine Radice (Fordham)
- Darren Guensch (Radford)
- Brittany Pinkney (VCU)

Legend

- (C) Team captain
- (S) Suspended
- (I) Ineligible
- (W) Walk-on
- Injured
- Current redshirt

Roster
Last update: July 7, 2024

== Schedule ==
| Date time, TV | Rank^{#} | Opponent^{#} | Result | Record | Site (attendance) city, state |
Non-conference regular season
| November 6, 2018*; 6:00 p.m., ESPN3 | | at Monmouth | W 70–32 | 1–0 | OceanFirst Bank Center (815); West Long Branch, NJ |
| November 11, 2018*; 4:00 p.m. | | Quinnipiac | W 75–58 | 2–0 | Sojka Pavilion (1,215); Lewisburg, PA |
| November 15, 2018*; 7:00 p.m. | | at Drexel | L 42–64 | 2–1 | Daskalakis Athletic Center (359); Philadelphia, PA |
| November 18, 2018*; 2:00 p.m., ACCNE | | at Syracuse | L 56–70 | 2–2 | Carrier Dome (1,409); Syracuse, NY |
| November 23, 2018*; 6:00 p.m. | | vs. Massachusetts; Brown University Turkey Tip-Off | W 77–58 | 3–2 | Pizzitola Sports Center (436); Providence, RI |
| November 24, 2018*; 4:00 p.m. | | vs. Fairfield; Brown University Turkey Tip-Off | W 77–54 | 4–2 | Pizzitola Sports Center (344); Providence, RI |
| November 25, 2018*; 1:00 p.m., ESPN+ | | at Brown; Brown University Turkey Tip-Off | W 91–78 | 5–2 | Pizzitola Sports Center (927); Providence, RI |
| November 29, 2018*; 7:00 p.m., ESPN+ | | at St. Bonaventure | W 77–46 | 6–2 | Reilly Center (486); Olean, NY |
| December 2, 2018*; 2:00 p.m. | | Iona | W 81–43 | 7–2 | Sojka Pavilion (659); Lewisburg, PA |
| December 15, 2018*; 2:00 p.m. | | Rider | W 80–59 | 8–2 | Sojka Pavilion (825); Lewisburg, PA |
| December 18, 2018*; 11:00 am | | Youngstown State | W 73–68 | 9–2 | Sojka Pavilion (1,990); Lewisburg, PA |
| December 29, 2018*; 2:00 p.m. | | at Iowa State | L 61–86 | 9–3 | Hilton Coliseum (10,261); Ames, IA |
Patriot League regular season
| January 3, 2019; 6:00 p.m. | | American | W 71–56 | 10–3 (1–0) | Sojka Pavilion (836); Lewisburg, PA |
| January 6, 2019; 2:00 p.m. | | Boston University | L 62–70 | 10–4 (1–1) | Sojka Pavilion (1,452); Lewisburg, PA |
| January 9, 2019; 7:00 p.m. | | at Army | W 66–52 | 11–4 (2–1) | Christl Arena (522); West Point, NY |
| January 12, 2019; 2:00 p.m. | | at Lafayette | W 56–47 | 12–4 (3–1) | Kirby Sports Center (584); Easton, PA |
| January 16, 2019; 6:00 p.m. | | Lehigh | W 71–53 | 13–4 (4–1) | Sojka Pavilion (1,033); Lewisburg, PA |
| January 19, 2019; 12:00 p.m. | | at Colgate | W 90–62 | 14–4 (5–1) | Cotterell Court (263); Hamilton, NY |
| January 23, 2019; 6:00 p.m. | | at Loyola (MD) | W 75–57 | 15–4 (6–1) | Reitz Arena (273); Baltimore, MD |
| January 26, 2019; 6:00 p.m. | | Holy Cross | W 75–71 | 16–4 (7–1) | Sjoka Pavilion (1,321); Lewisburg, PA |
| January 30, 2019; 7:00 p.m. | | at Navy | W 77–43 | 17–4 (8–1) | Alumni Hall (1,072); Annapolis, MD |
| February 2, 2019; 2:00 p.m. | | at Boston University | W 62–58 | 18–4 (9–1) | Case Gym (538); Boston, MA |
| February 9, 2019; 2:30 p.m. | | Lafayette | W 75–43 | 19–4 (10–1) | Sojka Pavilion (1,282); Lewisburg, PA |
| February 13, 2019; 6:00 p.m. | | Lehigh | W 73–68 | 20–4 (11–1) | Stabler Arena (616); Bethlehem, PA |
| February 16, 2019; 2:00 p.m. | | Colgate | W 76–58 | 21–4 (12–1) | Sojka Pavilion (850); Lewisburg, PA |
| February 20, 2019; 6:00 p.m. | | Loyola (MD) | W 87–55 | 22–4 (13–1) | Sojka Pavilion (836); Lewisburg, PA |
| February 23, 2019; 1:00 p.m. | | at Holy Cross | L 60–61 | 22–5 (13–2) | Hart Center (1,005); Worcester, MA |
| February 27, 2019; 6:00 p.m. | | Navy | W 90–48 | 23–5 (14–2) | Sjoka Pavilion (616); Lewisburg, PA |
| March 2, 2019; 2:00 p.m. | | at American | W 65–64 | 24–5 (15–2) | Bender Arena (770); Washington, D.C. |
| March 6, 2019; 6:00 p.m. | | Army | W 84–66 | 25–5 (16–2) | Sojka Pavilion (705); Lewisburg, PA |
Patriot League women's tournament
| March 11, 2019; 6:00 p.m. | (1) | (9) Loyola (MD); Quarterfinals | W 88–63 | 26–5 | Sojka Pavilion (846); Lewisburg, PA |
| March 14, 2019; 6:00 p.m. | (1) | (5) Holy Cross; Semifinals | W 66–31 | 27–5 | Sojka Pavilion (855); Lewisburg, PA |
| March 17, 2019; 12:00 p.m., CBSSN | (1) | (2) American; Championship game | W 66–54 | 28–5 | Sojka Pavilion (1,672); Lewisburg, PA |
NCAA women's tournament
| March 22, 2019*; 4:15 p.m., ESPN2 | (12 G) | vs. (5 G) No. 25 Florida State; First round | L 67–70 | 28–6 | Dale F. Halton Arena (1,750); Charlotte, NC |
*Non-conference game. ^{#}Rankings from AP poll. (#) Tournament seedings in parentheses. G=Greensboro Region. All times are in Eastern.

== See also ==
- 2018–19 Bucknell Bison men's basketball team
