= 2018–19 Navy Midshipmen women's basketball team =

Intercollegiate basketball season

2018–19 Navy Midshipmen women's basketball
- Conference: Patriot League
- Record: 10–18 (5–13 Patriot)
- Head coach: Stefanie Pemper (11th season)
- Assistant coaches: Jimmy Colloton; Ryenn Micaletti; Katie Rokus; Kaitlyn Vican
- Home arena: Alumni Hall

2018–19 Patriot League women's basketball standings
	Conf.				Overall
Team	W		L	PCT	W		L	PCT
Bucknell †	16	–	2	.889	28	–	6	.824
American	16	–	2	.889	22	–	11	.667
Lehigh	12	–	6	.667	21	–	10	.677
Boston University	11	–	7	.611	15	–	14	.517
Holy Cross	9	–	9	.500	18	–	13	.581
Colgate	8	–	10	.444	12	–	17	.414
Army	6	–	12	.333	11	–	19	.367
Navy	5	–	13	.278	10	–	19	.345
Loyola (MD)	5	–	13	.278	7	–	24	.226
Lafayette	2	–	16	.111	8	–	23	.258
† 2019 Patriot League tournament winner As of March 22, 2019; Rankings from AP poll

The 2018–19 Navy Midshipmen women's basketball team represented the United States Naval Academy during the 2018–19 NCAA Division I women's basketball season. The Midshipmen, led by eleventh year head coach Stefanie Pemper, played their home games at Alumni Hall and were members of the Patriot League. They finished the season 10–18, 5–13 in Patriot League play to finish in a tie for eighth place. They lost in the first round of the Patriot League women's tournament to Holy Cross.

== Roster ==
2018–19 Navy Midshipmen women's basketball team
Players
Coaches

Pos.	#	Name	Height	Year	Previous school	Hometown
G	0	Morgan Taylor	5 ft 7 in (1.7 m)	Jr	Greenbrier	Evans, GA
G	1	Kolbi Green	5 ft 4 in (1.63 m)	Fr	McDonogh School	Baltimore, MD
G	2	Jennifer Coleman	5 ft 9 in (1.75 m)	Fr	Highland Springs	Richmond, VA
G	3	Cayla Hannibal	5 ft 4 in (1.63 m)	So	Salem	Virginia Beach, VA
F	10	Laurel Jaunich	6 ft 0 in (1.83 m)	Jr	Champlain Valley Union	Charlotte, VT
G	12	Sierra Swanda	5 ft 10 in (1.78 m)	So	Potter's House Christian Academy	Jacksonville, FL
G	13	Sophie Gatzounas	5 ft 9 in (1.75 m)	So	South Hadley	South Hadley, MA
G	14	Darryl Langford	5 ft 10 in (1.78 m)	Fr	Fayette County	Fayetteville, GA
G	15	Bianca Roach	5 ft 7 in (1.7 m)	Sr	Cape Henry Collegiate	Virginia Beach, VA
G	21	Jasmine Bishop	5 ft 9 in (1.75 m)	So	Twinsburg	Twinsburg, OH
G	22	Cailin Duffy	5 ft 10 in (1.78 m)	Fr	Westerville South	Westerville, OH
F	30	Montana Braxton	5 ft 10 in (1.78 m)	Jr	Cape Elizabeth	Cape Elizabeth, ME
F	42	Ciera Hertelendy	6 ft 0 in (1.83 m)	Fr	Martinsburg	Inwood, WV
G	55	Mary Kate Ulasewicz	5 ft 5 in (1.65 m)	Jr	Mount Saint Joseph	Doylestown, PA

Head coach

- Stefanie Pemper (Idaho State)

Assistant coach(es)

- Jimmy Colloton (Wittenberg)
- Ryenn Micaletti (Seton Hill)
- Rebecca Tillett (William & Mary)
- Kaitlyn Vican (Fordham)

Legend

- (C) Team captain
- (S) Suspended
- (I) Ineligible
- (W) Walk-on
- Injured
- Current redshirt

Roster

== Schedule ==
Date time, TV	Rank^{#}	Opponent^{#}	Result	Record	Site (attendance) city, state
Non-conference regular season
Nov 7, 2018*; 7:30 pm		Catholic	W 81–36	1–0	Alumni Hall (447); Annapolis, MD
Nov 11, 2018*; 2:00 pm		Marist	L 48–72	1–1	Alumni Hall (439); Annapolis, MD
Nov 18, 2018*; 4:00 pm		at Norfolk State	L 58–65	1–2	Joseph G. Echols Memorial Hall (874); Norfolk, VA
Nov 24, 2018*; 1:00 pm		Penn; Navy Classic semifinals	L 61–65	1–3	Alumni Hall (414); Annapolis, MD
Nov 25, 2018*; 1:00 pm		North Carolina A&T; Navy Classic 3rd place game	W 72–49	2–3	Alumni Hall (368); Annapolis, MD
Dec 2, 2018*; 2:00 pm, ESPN+		at Rider	W 66–60	3–3	Alumni Gymnasium (712); Lawrenceville, NJ
Dec 7, 2018*; 6:30 pm		at Air Force	W 54–47	4–3	Clune Arena (1,013); Colorado Springs, CO
Dec 9, 2018*; 3:00 pm		at Colorado	L 43–59	4–4	CU Events Center (1,668); Fort Collins, CO
Dec 19, 2018*; 7:00 pm, ESPN+		at Monmouth	L 67–68	4–5	OceanFirst Bank Center (253); West Long Branch, NJ
Dec 31, 2018*; 6:00 pm		Saint Joseph's	W 49–48	5–5	Alumni Hall (358); Annapolis, MD
Patriot League regular season
Jan 3, 2019; 12:00 pm		at Loyola (MD)	W 58–46	6–5 (1–0)	Reitz Arena (216); Baltimore, MD
Jan 6, 2019; 3:30 pm		Lehigh	L 38–56	6–6 (1–1)	Alumni Hall (1,236); Annapolis, MD
Jan 9, 2019; 7:00 pm		American	L 45–58	6–7 (1–2)	Alumni Hall (409); Annapolis, MD
Jan 12, 2019; 1:00 pm		at Colgate	W 62–49	7–7 (2–2)	Cotterell Court (224); Hamilton, NY
Jan 16, 2019; 7:00 pm		Holy Cross	W 54–47	8–7 (3–2)	Alumni Hall (1,106); Annapolis, MD
Jan 19, 2019; 11:00 am, CBSSN		at Army	L 52–55	8–8 (3–3)	Christl Arena (5,013); West Point, NY
Jan 23, 2019; 11:00 am		at Lafayette	L 42–55	8–9 (3–4)	Kirby Sports Center (973); Easton, PA
Jan 26, 2019; 4:00 pm		Boston University	L 35–49	8–10 (3–5)	Alumni Hall (849); Annapolis, MD
Jan 30, 2019; 7:00 pm		Bucknell	L 43–77	8–11 (3–6)	Alumni Hall (1,072); Annapolis, MD
Feb 2, 2019; 2:00 pm		Lehigh	L 55–66	8–12 (3–7)	Stabler Arena (620); Bethlehem, PA
Feb 9, 2019; 4:00 pm		Colgate	W 67–52	9–12 (4–7)	Alumni Hall (609); Annapolis, MD
Feb 13, 2019; 5:00 pm		at Holy Cross	L 44–47	9–13 (4–8)	Hart Center (769); Worcester, MA
Feb 16, 2019; 12:00 pm, CBSSN		Army	L 48–60	9–14 (4–9)	Alumni Hall (5,548); Annapolis, MD
Feb 20, 2019; 7:00 pm		Lafayette	W 65–53	10–14 (5–9)	Alumni Hall (1,065); Annapolis, MD
Feb 23, 2019; 2:00 pm		at Boston University	L 55–66	10–15 (5–10)	Case Gym (1,054); Boston, MA
Feb 27, 2019; 6:00 pm		at Bucknell	L 48–90	10–16 (5–11)	Sojka Pavilion (616); Lewisburg, PA
Mar 2, 2019; 7:00 pm		Loyola (MD)	L 50–55	10–17 (5–12)	Alumni Hall (639); Annapolis, MD
Mar 6, 2019; 7:00 pm		at American	L 44–69	10–18 (5–13)	Bender Arena (424); Washington, D.C.
Patriot League Women's Tournament
Mar 9, 2019; 2:00 pm	(9)	at (8) Loyola (MD); First Round	L 45–58	10–19	Reitz Arena (242); Baltimore, MD
*Non-conference game. ^{#}Rankings from AP Poll. (#) Tournament seedings in parentheses. All times are in Eastern Time.

== Rankings ==
2018–19 NCAA Division I women's basketball rankings

+ Regular season polls	Poll	Pre- Season	Week 2	Week 3	Week 4	Week 5	Week 6	Week 7	Week 8	Week 9	Week 10	Week 11	Week 12	Week 13	Week 14	Week 15	Week 16	Week 17	Week 18	Week 19	Final
AP																				N/A	
Coaches		N/A																			

Legend
	Increase in ranking
	Decrease in ranking
	Not ranked previous week
(RV)	Received Votes

== See also ==
2018–19 Navy Midshipmen men's basketball team
