= 2018–19 American Eagles women's basketball team =

Intercollegiate basketball season

2018–19 American Eagles women's basketball

Patriot League regular season co-champions

WNIT, First Round
- Conference: Patriot League
- Record: 22–11 (16–2 Patriot)
- Head coach: Megan Gebbia (6th season)
- Assistant coaches: Tiffany Coll; Nikki Flores; Emily Stallings
- Home arena: Bender Arena

2018–19 Patriot League women's basketball standings
	Conf.				Overall
Team	W		L	PCT	W		L	PCT
Bucknell †	16	–	2	.889	28	–	6	.824
American	16	–	2	.889	22	–	11	.667
Lehigh	12	–	6	.667	21	–	10	.677
Boston University	11	–	7	.611	15	–	14	.517
Holy Cross	9	–	9	.500	18	–	13	.581
Colgate	8	–	10	.444	12	–	17	.414
Army	6	–	12	.333	11	–	19	.367
Navy	5	–	13	.278	10	–	19	.345
Loyola (MD)	5	–	13	.278	7	–	24	.226
Lafayette	2	–	16	.111	8	–	23	.258
† 2019 Patriot League tournament winner As of March 22, 2019; Rankings from AP poll

The 2018–19 American Eagles women's basketball team represented American University during the 2018–19 NCAA Division I women's basketball season. The Eagles, led by sixth year head coach Megan Gebbia, played their home games at Bender Arena and were members of the Patriot League. They finished the season 22–11, 16–2 in Patriot League play to share the Patriot League regular season title with Bucknell. They advanced to the championship game to the Patriot League women's tournament, where they lost to Bucknell. They recited an automatic trip to the WNIT, where they lost in the first round to Penn.

== Roster ==
2018–19 American Eagles women's basketball team
Players
Coaches

Pos.	#	Name	Height	Year	Previous school	Hometown
F	2	Morgan Bartner	6 ft 2 in (1.88 m)	Sr	Morristown Beard	Florham Park, NJ
G	3	Kaitlyn Lewis	5 ft 7 in (1.7 m)	Sr	North Pocono	Scranton, PA
G	4	Emily Fisher	5 ft 7 in (1.7 m)	Fr	Emmaus College	Melbourne, Australia
G	10	Jade Edwards	5 ft 10 in (1.78 m)	Fr	The Latin School of Chicago	Chicago, IL
F	11	TaeKenya Cleveland	6 ft 0 in (1.83 m)	Jr	Regis Jesuit	Aurora, CO
G	12	Indeya Sanders	5 ft 5 in (1.65 m)	So	Herndon	Reston, VA
F	14	Taylor Brown	6 ft 1 in (1.85 m)	Fr	Lakeville	Lakeville, MN
G	21	Maddie Doring	5 ft 11 in (1.8 m)	Fr	St. John Vianney	Sayreville, NJ
G	22	Katie Marenyi	5 ft 8 in (1.73 m)	Jr	Penn	Granger, IN
G	23	Elina Koskimies	6 ft 0 in (1.83 m)	Sr	Makelanrinne Sports High	Helsinki, Finland
G	24	Laura Graytok	5 ft 8 in (1.73 m)	Fr	Latrobe	Pittsburgh, PA
F	44	Cecily Carl	6 ft 3 in (1.91 m)	Sr	Mechanicsburg	Mechanicsburg, PA

Head coach

- Megan Gebbia (Towson)

Assistant coach(es)

- Tiffany Coll (UMBC)
- Nikki Flores (Marist)
- Emily Stallings (Marist)

Legend

- (C) Team captain
- (S) Suspended
- (I) Ineligible
- (W) Walk-on
- Injured
- Current redshirt

Roster

== Schedule ==
Date time, TV	Rank^{#}	Opponent^{#}	Result	Record	Site (attendance) city, state
Non-conference regular season
Nov 9, 2018*; 1:00 pm		Tulsa	W 68–52	1–0	Bender Arena (609); Washington, D.C.
Nov 14, 2018*; 7:00 pm		George Mason	W 86–71	2–0	Bender Arena (581); Washington, D.C.
Nov 19, 2018*; 3:00 pm		at Denver	L 54–83	2–1	Hamilton Gymnasium (530); Denver, CO
Nov 23, 2018*; 11:59 pm		at Hawaii; Rainbow Wahine Shootout	W 69–57	3–1	Stan Sheriff Center; Honolulu, HI
Nov 24, 2018*; 5:00 pm		vs. No. 8 Stanford; Rainbow Wahine Shootout	L 49–71	3–2	Stan Sheriff Center; Honolulu, HI
Nov 25, 2018*; 5:00 pm		vs. Florida Gulf Coast; Rainbow Wahine Shootout	L 71–90	3–3	Stan Sheriff Center; Honolulu, HI
Nov 28, 2018*; 7:00 pm		UMBC	W 64–42	4–3	Bender Arena (355); Washington, D.C.
Dec 5, 2018*; 7:00 pm, ACCNE		at Virginia	L 54–57	4–4	John Paul Jones Arena (2,549); Charlottesville, VA
Dec 16, 2018*; 2:00 pm		at Penn State	L 59–80	4–5	Bryce Jordan Center (2,257); University Park, PA
Dec 20, 2018*; 5:00 pm, ESPN+		at High Point	L 61–66	4–6	Millis Athletic Center (423); High Point, NC
Dec 29, 2018*; 2:00 pm		Ohio	L 67–77	4–7	Bender Arena (334); Washington, D.C.
Patriot League regular season
Jan 3, 2019; 6:00 pm		at Bucknell	L 56–71	4–8 (0–1)	Sojka Pavilion (836); Lewisburg, PA
Jan 6, 2019; 2:00 pm		Colgate	W 76–57	5–8 (1–1)	Bender Arena (380); Washington, D.C.
Jan 9, 2019; 7:00 pm		at Navy	W 58–45	6–8 (2–1)	Alumni Hall (409); Annapolis, MD
Jan 12, 2019; 1:00 pm		Army	W 61–51	7–8 (3–1)	Bender Arena (644); Washington, D.C.
Jan 16, 2019; 7:00 pm		Loyola (MD)	W 82–38	8–8 (4–1)	Bender Arena (404); Washington, D.C.
Jan 19, 2019; 4:30 pm		at Lehigh	W 61–53	9–8 (5–1)	Stabler Arena (1,558); Bethlehem, PA
Jan 23, 2019; 7:00 pm		at Boston University	W 64–51	10–8 (6–1)	Case Gym (783); Boston, MA
Jan 26, 2019; 12:00 pm		Lafayette	W 60–45	11–8 (7–1)	Bender Arena (513); Washington, D.C.
Jan 30, 2019; 7:00 pm		Holy Cross	W 70–58	12–8 (8–1)	Bender Arena (343); Washington, D.C.
Feb 2, 2019; 4:00 pm		at Colgate	W 71–66	13–8 (9–1)	Cotterell Court (231); Hamilton, NY
Feb 9, 2019; 1:00 pm		at Army	W 75–62	14–8 (10–1)	Christl Arena (427); West Point, NY
Feb 13, 2019; 6:00 pm		at Loyola (MD)	W 67–56	15–8 (11–1)	Reitz Arena (705); Baltimore, MD
Feb 16, 2019; 12:00 pm		Lehigh	W 50–47	16–8 (12–1)	Bender Arena (574); Washington, D.C.
Feb 20, 2019; 11:30 am		Boston University	W 50–48	17–8 (13–1)	Bender Arena (349); Washington, D.C.
Feb 23, 2019; 2:00 pm		at Lafayette	W 57–47	18–8 (14–1)	Kirby Sports Center (447); Easton, PA
Feb 27, 2019; 6:05 pm		at Holy Cross	W 71–44	19–8 (15–1)	Hart Center (594); Worcester, MA
Mar 2, 2019; 2:00 pm		Bucknell	L 64–65	19–9 (15–2)	Bender Arena (770); Washington, D.C.
Mar 6, 2019; 7:00 pm		Navy	W 69–44	20–9 (16–2)	Bender Arena (424); Washington, D.C.
Patriot League Women's Tournament
Mar 11, 2019; 7:00 pm	(2)	(10) Lafayette; Quarterfinals	W 67–47	21–9	Bender Arena (303); Washington, D.C.
Mar 14, 2019; 7:00 pm	(2)	(3) Lehigh; Semifinals	W 68–57	22–9	Bender Arena (393); Washington, D.C.
Mar 17, 2019; 12:00 pm, CBSSN	(2)	at (1) Bucknell; Championship Game	L 54–66	22–10	Sojka Pavilion (1,672); Lewisburg, PA
WNIT
Mar 22, 2019*; 7:00 pm		at Penn; First Round	L 45–64	22–11	Palestra (817); Philadelphia, PA
*Non-conference game. ^{#}Rankings from AP poll. (#) Tournament seedings in parentheses. All times are in Eastern Time.

== See also ==
- 2018–19 American Eagles men's basketball team
