= 2018–19 Holy Cross Crusaders women's basketball team =

Intercollegiate basketball season

2018–19 Holy Cross Crusaders women's basketball
- Conference: Patriot League
- Record: 18–13 (9–9 Patriot)
- Head coach: Bill Gibbons (34th season)
- Assistant coaches: Ann McInerney; Jeff Kirpas; Danielle Parks
- Home arena: Hart Center

2018–19 Patriot League women's basketball standings
	Conf.				Overall
Team	W		L	PCT	W		L	PCT
Bucknell †	16	–	2	.889	28	–	6	.824
American	16	–	2	.889	22	–	11	.667
Lehigh	12	–	6	.667	21	–	10	.677
Boston University	11	–	7	.611	15	–	14	.517
Holy Cross	9	–	9	.500	18	–	13	.581
Colgate	8	–	10	.444	12	–	17	.414
Army	6	–	12	.333	11	–	19	.367
Navy	5	–	13	.278	10	–	19	.345
Loyola (MD)	5	–	13	.278	7	–	24	.226
Lafayette	2	–	16	.111	8	–	23	.258
† 2019 Patriot League tournament winner As of March 22, 2019; Rankings from AP poll

The 2018–19 Holy Cross Crusaders women's basketball team represented the College of the Holy Cross during the 2018–19 NCAA Division I women's basketball season. The Crusaders, led by thirty-fourth year head coach Bill Gibbons, played their home games at the Hart Center and were members of the Patriot League. They finished the season 18–13, 9–9 in Patriot League play to finish in fifth place. They advanced to the quarterfinals of the Patriot League women's tournament, where they lost to Bucknell.

== Roster ==
2018–19 Holy Cross Crusaders women's basketball team
Players
Coaches

Pos.	#	Name	Height	Year	Previous school	Hometown
F	2	Oluchi Ezemma	5 ft 11 in (1.8 m)	Fr	Moses Brown	Hope Valley, RI
G	3	Avery LaBarbera	5 ft 6 in (1.68 m)	Fr	Harrison	Harrison, NY
G	4	Jenay Faulkner	5 ft 11 in (1.8 m)	So	Greencastle-Antrim	Greencastle, PA
G	10	Megan Swords	6 ft 3 in (1.91 m)	Jr	Immaculate Heart Academy	Glen Rock NJ
G	12	Madalyn Smith	5 ft 8 in (1.73 m)	Jr	High Point Regional	Sussex, NJ
G/F	14	Kathryn Pedi	5 ft 9 in (1.75 m)	Jr	New Trier	Wilmette, IL
F	20	Madison Demski	6 ft 3 in (1.91 m)	Fr	Villa Maria Academy	Erie, PA
G	21	Mia Mazza	5 ft 8 in (1.73 m)	So	St. Francis	Glen Ellyn, IL
G	22	Nicole Morris	5 ft 8 in (1.73 m)	Jr	Rumson-Fair Haven Regional	Rumson, NJ
F	23	Maggie Locke	6 ft 1 in (1.85 m)	Sr	Spring-Ford	Collegeville, PA
F	25	Lauren Manis	6 ft 1 in (1.85 m)	Jr	Bishop Feehan	Franklin, MA
C	33	Shannon Murphy	6 ft 1 in (1.85 m)	So	Watertown	Watertown, MA
G	42	Kelly Petro	6 ft 1 in (1.85 m)	Fr	Pascack Valley	Hillsdale, NJ
C	55	Miranda Nixon	6 ft 3 in (1.91 m)	Sr	Trinity	Harrisburg, PA

Head coach

- Bill Gibbons (Clark)

Assistant coach(es)

- Ann McInerney (Assumption (MA))
- Jeff Kirpas (Holy Cross)
- Danielle Parks (Adelphi)

Legend

- (C) Team captain
- (S) Suspended
- (I) Ineligible
- (W) Walk-on
- Injured
- Current redshirt

Roster

== Schedule ==
Date time, TV	Rank^{#}	Opponent^{#}	Result	Record	Site (attendance) city, state
Exhibition
Nov 5, 2018*; 6:05 pm		Assumption	W 73–62		Hart Center; Worcester, MA
Non-conference regular season
Nov 11, 2018*; 7:05 pm		Rider	W 71–61	1–0	Hart Center (637); Worcester, MA
Nov 15, 2018*; 11:30 am, ACCNE		at Boston College	L 63–89	1–1	Conte Forum (3,117); Chestnut Hill, MA
Nov 18, 2018*; 12:05 pm, NESN+		Brown	L 85–89	1–2	Hart Center (672); Worcester, MA
Nov 21, 2018*; 3:05 pm, NESN		Rhode Island	W 73–65	2–2	Hart Center (775); Worcester, MA
Nov 25, 2018*; 2:00 pm, ESPN+		at Albany	W 56–50	3–2	SEFCU Arena (978); Albany, NY
Nov 28, 2018*; 7:00 pm, ESPN+		at Vermont	W 65–40	4–2	Patrick Gym (332); Burlington, VT
Dec 2, 2018*; 1:05 pm		UMass Lowell	W 63–54	5–2	Hart Center (713); Worcester, MA
Dec 5, 2018*; 6:05 pm, NESN		Hofstra	W 72–66 ^{OT}	6–2	Hart Center (693); Worcester, MA
Dec 9, 2018*; 1:00 pm		at New Hampshire	L 62–74	6–3	Lundholm Gym (256); Durham, NH
Dec 19, 2018*; 11:05 am, NESN		Manhattan	W 61–53	7–3	Hart Center (1,755); Worcester, MA
Dec 30, 2018*; 1:00 pm		at Bryant	W 81–62	8–3	Chace Athletic Center (519); Smithfield, RI
Patriot League regular season
Jan 3, 2019; 6:05 pm		Colgate	L 67–70	8–4 (0–1)	Hart Center (592); Worcester, MA
Jan 6, 2019; 2:00 pm		at Lafayette	L 63–73	8–5 (0–2)	Kirby Sports Center (422); Easton, PA
Jan 9, 2019; 6:00 pm		at Lehigh	L 55–64	8–6 (0–3)	Stabler Arena (604); Bethlehem, PA
Jan 12, 2019; 12:05 pm, WCTR		Loyola (MD)	W 78–60	9–6 (1–3)	Hart Center (828); Worcester, MA
Jan 16, 2019; 7:00 pm		at Navy	L 47–54	9–7 (1–4)	Alumni Hall (1,106); Annapolis, MD
Jan 19, 2019; 3:05 pm		Boston University; Rivalry	W 75–69	10–7 (2–4)	Hart Center (928); Worcester, MA
Jan 23, 2019; 6:05 pm, NESN+		Army	W 58–39	11–7 (3–4)	Hart Center (778); Worcester, MA
Jan 26, 2019; 2:00 pm		at Bucknell	L 71–75	11–8 (3–5)	Sojka Pavilion (1,321); Lewisburg, PA
Jan 30, 2019; 7:00 pm		at American	L 58–70	11–9 (3–6)	Bender Arena (343); Washington, D.C.
Feb 2, 2019; 1:05 pm		Lafayette	W 56–53 ^{OT}	12–9 (4–6)	Hart Center (888); Worcester, MA
Feb 9, 2019; 4:00 pm		at Loyola (MD)	W 58–48	13–9 (5–6)	Reitz Arena (252); Baltimore, MD
Feb 13, 2019; 5:05 pm, NESN		Navy	W 47–44	14–9 (6–6)	Hart Center (769); Worcester, MA
Feb 16, 2019; 2:00 pm		at Boston University; Rivalry	W 64–61	15–9 (7–6)	Case Gym; Boston, MA
Feb 20, 2019; 7:00 pm		at Army	L 53–60	15–10 (7–7)	Christl Arena (486); West Point, NY
Feb 23, 2019; 1:05 pm		Bucknell	W 61–60	16–10 (8–7)	Hart Center (1,005); Worcester, MA
Feb 27, 2019; 6:05 pm, NESN+		American	L 44–71	16–11 (9–7)	Hart Center (594); Worcester, MA
Mar 2, 2019; 2:00 pm		at Colgate	W 80–67	17–11 (10–7)	Cotterell Court (287); Hamilton, NY
Mar 6, 2019; 6:05 pm		Lehigh	L 74–79 ^{OT}	17–12 (10–8)	Hart Center (632); Worcester, MA
Patriot League Women's Tournament
Mar 11, 2019; 7:00 pm	(5)	at (4) Boston University; Quarterfinals	W 72–70	18–12	Case Gym (490); Boston, MA
Mar 14, 2019; 6:00 pm	(5)	at (1) Bucknell; Semifinals	L 31–66	18–13	Sojka Pavilion (855); Lewisburg, PA
*Non-conference game. ^{#}Rankings from AP Poll. (#) Tournament seedings in parentheses. All times are in Eastern Time.

== See also ==
2018–19 Holy Cross Crusaders men's basketball team
