= Landon Jones =

American editor and author (1943–2024)

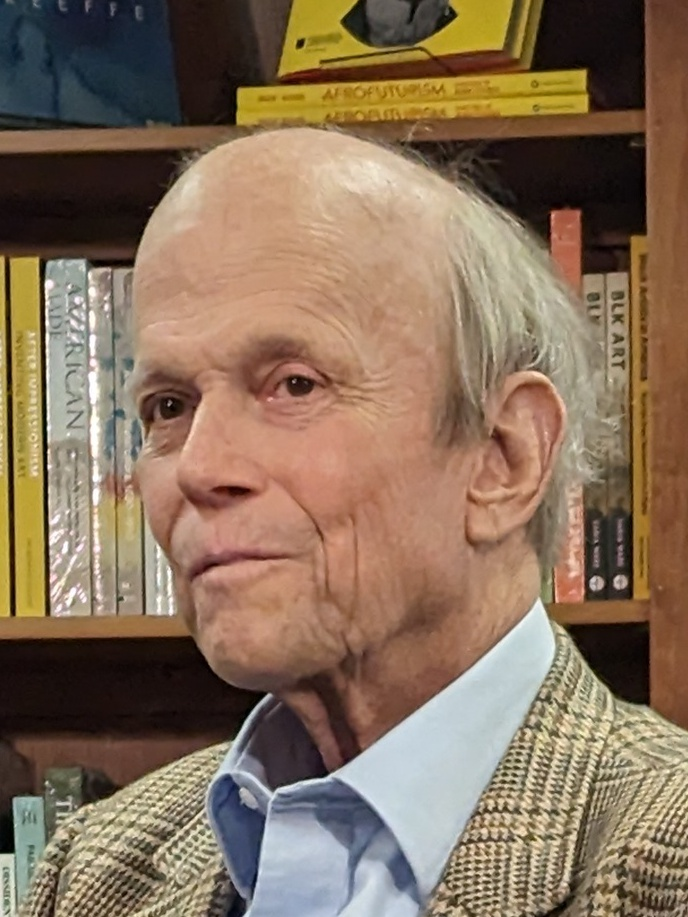
- Jones in 2023
- Born: November 4, 1943; Rome, Georgia, U.S.
- Died: August 17, 2024 (aged 80); Plainsboro, New Jersey, U.S.
- Education: Princeton University
- Occupations: Editor; author
- Spouse: Sarah Brown
- Children: 3

Landon Young Jones Jr. (November 4, 1943 – August 17, 2024) was an American editor and author. He was the managing editor of People magazine and the author of William Clark and the Shaping of the West, a biography of William Clark, joint leader of the Lewis and Clark Expedition.

== Background ==
Jones was born in Rome, Georgia, in 1943. He grew up in St. Louis, attending the St. Louis Country Day School, and went on to attend Princeton University, where he became involved with The Daily Princetonian and Princeton Alumni Weekly

== Career ==
After graduating in 1966, Jones was hired by Time Inc., writing first for its flagship Time magazine until 1971, when he spent three years editing Princeton Alumni Weekly. He returned to Time Inc. and joined People around the time of its founding in 1974. In 1989, he became its managing editor, holding the role for the next eight years. Under his watch, sales quadrupled, and he oversaw the launch of three related publications: In Touch, People en Español, and Who. He also served as editor of Time Inc.'s Money magazine from 1984 to 1989. He retired from the magazine business in 2000.

Jones also edited a selection of the expedition journals, The Essential Lewis and Clark, and was the author of Great Expectations: America and the Baby Boom Generation. In a review for his last book, Celebrity Nation, Publishers Weekly called him an "astute chronicler of celebrity culture". In Celebrity Nation, Jones shares his analysis of over 75 celebrities over many decades and shows us how the apparatus of fame operates.

== Personal life and death ==
Jones and his wife, the former Sarah Brown, had three children. He was resident of Princeton, New Jersey, for almost all of his adult life, but also maintained a residence near Bozeman, Montana.

Jones died from complications of myelofibrosis at a hospital in Plainsboro, New Jersey, on August 17, 2024, at the age of 80.

== Bibliography ==
- Jones, Landon (2023). Celebrity Nation: How America Evolved into a Culture of Fans and Followers. Boston, MA: Beacon Press. ISBN 978-08070-6565-5.
- Jones, Landon (2004). William Clark and the Shaping of the West. New York: Hill and Wang. ISBN 0-8090-3041-1.
- Lewis, Meriwether; Clark, William (2000). Jones, Landon (ed.). The Essential Lewis and Clark. New York: Ecco. ISBN 978-0-06-019600-4.
- Jones, Landon (1980). Great Expectations: America and the Baby Boom Generation. New York: Coward, McCann & Geoghegan. ISBN 978-0-698-11049-6.
