= 2018–19 Lafayette Leopards women's basketball team =

Intercollegiate basketball season

2018–19 Lafayette Leopards women's basketball
- Conference: Patriot League
- Record: 9–22 (2–16 Patriot)
- Head coach: Kia Damon (2nd season)
- Assistant coaches: Tom Lochner; Natalie Jarrett; Jennifer Montoya
- Home arena: Kirby Sports Center

2018–19 Patriot League women's basketball standings
	Conf.				Overall
Team	W		L	PCT	W		L	PCT
Bucknell †	16	–	2	.889	28	–	6	.824
American	16	–	2	.889	22	–	11	.667
Lehigh	12	–	6	.667	21	–	10	.677
Boston University	11	–	7	.611	15	–	14	.517
Holy Cross	9	–	9	.500	18	–	13	.581
Colgate	8	–	10	.444	12	–	17	.414
Army	6	–	12	.333	11	–	19	.367
Navy	5	–	13	.278	10	–	19	.345
Loyola (MD)	5	–	13	.278	7	–	24	.226
Lafayette	2	–	16	.111	8	–	23	.258
† 2019 Patriot League tournament winner As of March 22, 2019; Rankings from AP poll

The 2018–19 Lafayette Leopards women's basketball team represented Lafayette College during the 2018–19 NCAA Division I women's basketball season. The Leopards, led by second year head coach Kia Damon, played their home games at Kirby Sports Center and were members of the Patriot League. They finished the season 9–22, 2–16 in Patriot League play to finish in last place. They advanced to the quarterfinals of the Patriot League women's tournament, where they lost to Bucknell.

== Roster ==
2018–19 Lafayette Leopards women's basketball team
Players
Coaches

Pos.	#	Name	Height	Year	Previous school	Hometown
G	1	Jiselle Havas	5 ft 10 in (1.78 m)	Fr	Lake Highland Prep	Windermere, FL
G	2	Nia Holland	5 ft 6 in (1.68 m)	Sr	Shipley School	Landsdowne, PA
G	5	Drew Freeland	5 ft 8 in (1.73 m)	So	Hidden Valley	Roanoke, VA
G	10	Becca Margolis	5 ft 2 in (1.57 m)	Fr	Council Rock North	Newtown, PA
G	11	Alex Cantwell	5 ft 10 in (1.78 m)	Sr	North Shore	Glen Head, NY
F	12	Naomi Ganpo	6 ft 3 in (1.91 m)	Fr	Bishop Macdonell Catholic	Ontario, Canada
G	13	Sarah Agnello	5 ft 10 in (1.78 m)	Jr	Villa Maria Academy	Erie, PA
G	15	Nicole Johnson	5 ft 6 in (1.68 m)	Fr	East Brunswick	East Brunswick, NJ
G/F	21	Olivia Martino	5 ft 10 in (1.78 m)	So	National Christian Academy	Lanham, MD
F	24	Alexis Santarelli	6 ft 2 in (1.88 m)	Jr	Bishop Eustace Prep	Philadelphia, PA
F	25	Natalie Kucowski	6 ft 3 in (1.91 m)	So	Saint Basil Academy	Philadelphia, PA
G/F	30	Makaila Wilson	6 ft 0 in (1.83 m)	Fr	Penfield	Fairport, NY
G	31	Sydney Sabino	5 ft 8 in (1.73 m)	Jr	Rumson-Fair Haven	Rumson, NJ
G/F	34	Tasha Vipond	6 ft 2 in (1.88 m)	Jr	Ankeny Centennial	Ankeny, IA

Head coach

- Kia Damon (Millersville)

Assistant coach(es)

- Tom Lochner (Temple)
- Natalie Jarrett (UCLA)
- Jennifer Montoya (Penn State)

Legend

- (C) Team captain
- (S) Suspended
- (I) Ineligible
- (W) Walk-on
- Injured
- Current redshirt

Roster

== Schedule ==
Date time, TV	Rank^{#}	Opponent^{#}	Result	Record	Site (attendance) city, state
Non-conference regular season
Nov 9, 2018*; 7:00 pm		at Fairleigh Dickinson	W 63–57	1–0	Rothman Center (127); Teaneck, NJ
Nov 11, 2018*; 2:00 pm, WBPH		Binghamton	W 59–50	2–0	Kirby Sports Center (668); Easton, PA
Nov 17, 2018*; 1:00 pm		at Wagner	W 66–43	3–0	Spiro Sports Center (604); Staten Island, NY
Nov 20, 2018*; 7:00 pm, WBPH		Saint Peter's	L 60–62	3–1	Kirby Sports Center (358); Easton, PA
Nov 23, 2018*; 12:00 pm		at Florida Atlantic; FAU Thanksgiving Tournament semifinals	L 49–53	3–2	FAU Arena (472); Boca Raton, FL
Nov 24, 2018*; 12:00 pm		vs. Delaware; FAU Thanksgiving Tournament 3rd place game	L 47–65	3–3	FAU Arena (415); Boca Raton, FL
Dec 1, 2018*; 2:00 pm, WBPH		Albany	W 67–66 ^{2OT}	4–3	Kirby Sports Center (404); Easton, PA
Dec 4, 2018*; 7:00 pm		at Manhattan	L 49–60	4–4	Draddy Gymnasium (150); Riverdale, NY
Dec 8, 2018*; 2:00 pm, WBPH		Monmouth	W 73–69 ^{OT}	5–4	Kirby Sports Center (453); Easton, PA
Dec 20, 2018*; 12:00 pm, WBPH		Cornell	L 59–62	5–5	Kirby Sports Center (310); Easton, PA
Dec 29, 2018*; 2:00 pm		at LIU Brooklyn	L 50–55	5–6	Steinberg Wellness Center (297); Brooklyn, NY
Patriot League regular season
Jan 3, 2019; 7:00 pm, WBPH		Lehigh	L 43–70	5–7 (0–1)	Kirby Sports Center (588); Easton, PA
Jan 6, 2019; 2:00 pm, WBPH		Holy Cross	W 73–63	6–7 (1–1)	Kirby Sports Center (422); Easton, PA
Jan 9, 2019; 12:00 pm		at Colgate	L 49–60	6–8 (1–2)	Cotterell Court (1,574); Hamilton, NY
Jan 12, 2019; 2:00 pm, WBPH		Bucknell	L 47–56	6–9 (1–3)	Kirby Sports Center (584); Easton, PA
Jan 16, 2019; 11:00 am		at Army	L 50–65	6–10 (1–4)	Christl Arena (1,540); West Point, NY
Jan 20, 2019; 2:00 pm		at Loyola (MD)	L 50–62	6–11 (1–5)	Reitz Arena (442); Baltimore, MD
Jan 23, 2019; 11:00 am, WBPH		Navy	W 55–42	7–11 (2–5)	Kirby Sports Center (973); Easton, PA
Jan 26, 2019; 12:00 pm		at American	L 45–60	7–12 (2–6)	Bender Arena (513); Washington, D.C.
Jan 30, 2019; 6:00 pm, WBPH		Boston University	L 44–47	7–13 (2–7)	Kirby Sports Center (646); Easton, PA
Feb 2, 2019; 1:00 pm		at Holy Cross	L 53–56 ^{OT}	7–14 (2–8)	Hart Center (888); Worcester, MA
Feb 9, 2019; 2:30 pm		at Bucknell	L 43–75	7–15 (2–9)	Sojka Pavilion (1,282); Lewisburg, PA
Feb 13, 2019; 7:00 pm, WBPH		Army	L 40–64	7–16 (2–10)	Kirby Sports Center (322); Easton, PA
Feb 16, 2019; 2:00 pm, WBPH		Loyola (MD)	L 52–55	7–17 (2–11)	Kirby Sports Center (420); Easton, PA
Feb 20, 2019; 7:00 pm		at Navy	L 53–65	7–18 (2–12)	Alumni Hall (1,065); Annapolis, MD
Feb 23, 2019; 2:00 pm, WBPH		American	L 57–67	7–19 (2–13)	Kirby Sports Center (447); Easton, PA
Feb 27, 2019; 7:00 pm		at Boston University	L 49–50	8–19 (2–14)	Case Gym (280); Boston, MA
Mar 2, 2019; 6:00 pm		at Lehigh	L 50–67	8–20 (2–15)	Stabler Arena (918); Bethlehem, PA
Mar 6, 2019; 7:00 pm, WBPH		Colgate	L 67–77	8–21 (2–16)	Kirby Sports Center (347); Easton, PA
Patriot League Women's Tournament
Mar 9, 2019; 1:00 pm	(10)	at (7) Army; First Round	W 63–61	9–21	Christl Arena (197); West Point, NY
Mar 11, 2019; 7:00 pm	(7)	at (2) American; Quarterfinals	L 47–67	9–22	Bender Arena (303); Washington, D.C.
*Non-conference game. ^{#}Rankings from AP poll. (#) Tournament seedings in parentheses. All times are in Eastern Time.

== See also ==
- 2018–19 Lafayette Leopards men's basketball team
