= 2019 Patriot League women's basketball tournament =

- Classification: Division I
- Season: 2018–19
- Teams: 10
- Site: Campus sites
- Champions: Bucknell (4th title)
- Winning coach: Aaron Russell (2nd title)
- MVP: Kaitlyn Slagus (Bucknell)
- Television: PLN, CBSSN

2018–19 Patriot League women's basketball standings
	Conf.				Overall
Team	W		L	PCT	W		L	PCT
Bucknell †	16	–	2	.889	28	–	6	.824
American	16	–	2	.889	22	–	11	.667
Lehigh	12	–	6	.667	21	–	10	.677
Boston University	11	–	7	.611	15	–	14	.517
Holy Cross	9	–	9	.500	18	–	13	.581
Colgate	8	–	10	.444	12	–	17	.414
Army	6	–	12	.333	11	–	19	.367
Navy	5	–	13	.278	10	–	19	.345
Loyola (MD)	5	–	13	.278	7	–	24	.226
Lafayette	2	–	16	.111	8	–	23	.258
† 2019 Patriot League tournament winner As of March 22, 2019; Rankings from AP poll

The 2019 Patriot League women's basketball tournament was held from March 9, 11, 14 and 17 at campus sites of the higher seed, except that both semi-final games were played at the same site of the highest seed. The winner earned an automatic trip to the NCAA women's tournament. Bucknell won the conference tournament championship game over American, 66–54. Kaitlyn Slagus was named the tournament's Most Valuable Player.

== Seeds ==
Teams are seeded by conference record, with ties broken in the following order:

- Head-to-head record between the teams involved in the tie
- Record against the highest-seeded team not involved in the tie, going down through the seedings as necessary
- Higher RPI entering the tournament, as published by College Basketball News

American, Bucknell, Holy Cross, BU, and Lehigh received first round byes.

Seed	School	Conference	Overall	Tiebreaker
1	Bucknell	16–2	25–4	2–0 vs American
2	American	16–2	20–9	0–2 vs Bucknell
3	Lehigh	12–6	20–9	
4	Boston University	11–7	15–13	
5	Holy Cross	9–9	17–12	
6	Colgate	8–10	12–16	
7	Army	6–12	11–18	
8	Loyola (MD)	5–13	6–23	2–0 vs. Lafayette
9	Navy	5–13	10–18	1–1 vs. Lafayette
10	Lafayette	2–16	7–22	

== Schedule ==
Game	Time*	Matchup	Television	Attendance
First round – Saturday, March 9
1	1:00 pm	#10 Lafayette at #7 Army	PLN	197
2	2:00 pm	#9 Navy at #8 Loyola (MD)	PLN	242
Quarterfinals – Monday, March 11
3	6:00 pm	#10 Lafayette at #1 Bucknell	PLN	846
4	7:00 pm	#8 Loyola (MD) at #2 American	PLN	303
5	6:00 pm	#6 Colgate at #3 Lehigh	PLN	535
6	7:00 pm	#5 Holy Cross at #4 Boston University	PLN	490
Semifinals – Thursday, March 14
7	6:00 pm	#5 Holy Cross at #1 Bucknell	PLN	855
8	7:00 pm	#3 Lehigh at #2 American	PLN	393
Championship – Sunday, March 17
9	12:00 pm	#2 American at #1 Bucknell	CBSSN	1672
*Game times in ET. #-Rankings denote tournament seeding. All games hosted by higher-seeded team.

== Bracket ==
First round March 9 Patriot League Network
8	Loyola (MD)	58
9	Navy	45
7	Army	61
10	Lafayette	63

Quarterfinals; March 11; Patriot League Network
1	Bucknell	88
8	Loyola (MD)	63
4	Boston University	70
5	Holy Cross	72
2	American	67
10	Lafayette	47
3	Lehigh	78
6	Colgate	68

Semifinals; March 14; Patriot League Network
1	Bucknell	66
5	Holy Cross	31
2	American	68
3	Lehigh	57

Championship; March 17; CBS Sports Network
1	Bucknell	66
2	American	54
