= 2018–19 Loyola Greyhounds women's basketball team =

Intercollegiate basketball season

2018–19 Loyola Greyhounds women's basketball
- Conference: Patriot League
- Record: 7–24 (5–13 Patriot)
- Head coach: Joe Logan (13th season)
- Assistant coaches: Shelley Sheetz; Sarah Jones; Jenna Loschiavo
- Home arena: Reitz Arena

2018–19 Patriot League women's basketball standings
	Conf.				Overall
Team	W		L	PCT	W		L	PCT
Bucknell †	16	–	2	.889	28	–	6	.824
American	16	–	2	.889	22	–	11	.667
Lehigh	12	–	6	.667	21	–	10	.677
Boston University	11	–	7	.611	15	–	14	.517
Holy Cross	9	–	9	.500	18	–	13	.581
Colgate	8	–	10	.444	12	–	17	.414
Army	6	–	12	.333	11	–	19	.367
Navy	5	–	13	.278	10	–	19	.345
Loyola (MD)	5	–	13	.278	7	–	24	.226
Lafayette	2	–	16	.111	8	–	23	.258
† 2019 Patriot League tournament winner As of March 22, 2019; Rankings from AP poll

The 2018–19 Loyola Greyhounds women's basketball team represented Loyola University Maryland during the 2018–19 NCAA Division I women's basketball season. The Greyhounds, led by thirteenth year head coach Joe Logan, played their home games at Reitz Arena and were members of the Patriot League. They finished the season 7–24, 5–13 in Patriot League play to finish in a tie for eighth place. They advanced to the quarterfinals of the Patriot League women's tournament, where they lost to Bucknell.

== Roster ==
2018–19 Loyola Greyhounds women's basketball team
Players
Coaches

Pos.	#	Name	Height	Year	Previous school	Hometown
G	2	Laryn Edwards	5 ft 6 in (1.68 m)	Fr	Hampton	Allison Park, PA
G	3	Abby Omdahl	5 ft 11 in (1.8 m)	Sr	Saucon Valley	Bethlehem, PA
G/F	4	Taleah Dixon	5 ft 10 in (1.78 m)	Fr	McDonogh School	Baltimore, MD
G	10	Stephanie Karcz	5 ft 11 in (1.8 m)	Jr	Middletown South	Red Bank, NJ
G	11	Bri Betz-White	5 ft 3 in (1.6 m)	RS Sr	Trinity	Mechanicsburg, PA
G	12	Molly Taylor	5 ft 9 in (1.75 m)	Jr	Mercersburg Academy	Cranleigh, England
F	13	Izzy Therien	6 ft 0 in (1.83 m)	So	Cherokee	Marlton, NJ
F	15	Ashley Hunter	6 ft 0 in (1.83 m)	Sr	The John Carroll School	Abingdon, MD
G	20	Alexis Gray	5 ft 6 in (1.68 m)	Jr	Georgetown Visitation	Clarksburg, MD
G	22	Alex Barazotti	5 ft 6 in (1.68 m)	Sr	Red Bank Catholic	Howell, NJ
F	23	Delaney Connolly	6 ft 0 in (1.83 m)	So	Oakton	Vienna, VA
G	32	Hannah Niles	5 ft 9 in (1.75 m)	Jr	Walt Whitman	Glen Echo, MD
F	55	Courtney Vannoy	6 ft 1 in (1.85 m)	Sr	Blackhawk	Beaver Falls, PA

Head coach

- Joe Logan (Loyola (MD))

Assistant coach(es)

- Shelley Sheetz (Colorado)
- Sarah Jones (Villanova)
- Jenna Loschiavo (Saint Joseph's)

Legend

- (C) Team captain
- (S) Suspended
- (I) Ineligible
- (W) Walk-on
- Injured
- Current redshirt

Roster

== Schedule ==
Date time, TV	Rank^{#}	Opponent^{#}	Result	Record	Site (attendance) city, state
Non-conference regular season
Nov 6, 2018*; 4:00 pm, ESPN+		at George Mason	L 38–70	0–1	EagleBank Arena (687); Fairfax, VA
Nov 9, 2018*; 7:00 pm, ESPN+		at Dartmouth	L 41–54	0–2	Leede Arena (637); Hanover, NH
Nov 13, 2018*; 7:00 pm		at Georgetown	L 30–45	0–3	McDonough Gymnasium (163); Washington, D.C.
Nov 17, 2018*; 2:00 pm		William & Mary	L 49–65	0–4	Reitz Arena (352); Baltimore, MD
Nov 24, 2018*; 2:00 pm		vs. Boston College; Hawk Classic semifinals	L 47–73	0–5	Hagan Arena (737); Philadelphia, PA
Nov 25, 2018*; 2:00 pm, ESPN+		at Saint Joseph's; Hawk Classic 3rd place game	L 46–49	0–6	Hagan Arena (413); Philadelphia, PA
Dec 1, 2018*; 4:00 pm		Mount St. Mary's	L 67–77	0–7	Reitz Arena (1,244); Baltimore, MD
Dec 4, 2018*; 11:00 am		at Towson	L 57–62	0–8	SECU Arena (3,423); Towson, MD
Dec 7, 2018*; 7:00 pm		St. Francis Brooklyn	L 70–75 ^{3OT}	0–9	Reitz Arena (513); Baltimore, MD
Dec 10, 2018*; 11:00 am		at No. 6 Maryland	L 48–83	0–10	Xfinity Center (9,736); College Park, MD
Dec 22, 2018*; 12:00 pm, ESPN+		at Monmouth	W 75–67	1–10	OceanFirst Bank Center (410); West Long Branch, NJ
Patriot League regular season
Jan 3, 2019; 12:00 pm		Navy	L 46–58	1–11 (0–1)	Reitz Arena (216); Baltimore, MD
Jan 6, 2019; 1:00 pm		at Army	L 57–69	1–12 (0–2)	Christl Arena (765); West Point, NY
Jan 9, 2019; 11:30 am		Boston University	L 62–64 ^{OT}	1–13 (0–3)	Reitz Arena (767); Baltimore, MD
Jan 12, 2019; 12:00 pm		at Holy Cross	L 60–78	1–14 (0–4)	Hart Center (828); Worcester, MA
Jan 16, 2019; 7:00 pm		at American	L 38–82	1–15 (0–5)	Bender Arena (404); Washington, D.C.
Jan 20, 2019; 2:00 pm		Lafayette	W 62–50	2–15 (1–5)	Reitz Arena (442); Baltimore, MD
Jan 23, 2019; 6:00 pm		Bucknell	L 57–75	2–16 (1–6)	Reitz Arena (273); Baltimore, MD
Jan 26, 2019; 2:00 pm		at Colgate	L 64–73 ^{OT}	2–17 (1–7)	Cotterell Court (450); Hamilton, NY
Jan 30, 2019; 6:00 pm		at Lehigh	L 42–51	2–18 (1–8)	Stabler Arena (420); Bethlehem, PA
Feb 2, 2019; 2:00 pm		Army	W 70–51	3–18 (2–8)	Reitz Arena (619); Baltimore, MD
Feb 9, 2019; 4:00 pm		Holy Cross	L 48–58	3–19 (2–9)	Reitz Arena (252); Baltimore, MD
Feb 13, 2019; 6:00 pm		American	L 56–67	3–20 (2–10)	Reitz Arena (705); Baltimore, MD
Feb 16, 2019; 2:00 pm		at Lafayette	W 55–52	4–20 (3–10)	Kirby Sports Center (420); Easton, PA
Feb 20, 2019; 6:00 pm		at Bucknell	L 55–87	4–21 (3–11)	Sojka Pavilion (836); Lewisburg, PA
Feb 23, 2019; 4:00 pm		Colgate	L 47–58	4–22 (3–12)	Reitz Arena (319); Baltimore, MD
Feb 27, 2019; 6:00 pm		Lehigh	L 46–65	4–23 (3–13)	Reitz Arena (275); Baltimore, MD
Mar 2, 2019; 7:00 pm		at Navy	W 55–50	5–23 (4–13)	Alumni Hall (639); Annapolis, MD
Mar 7, 2019; 7:00 pm		at Boston University	W 59–55	6–23 (5–13)	Case Gym (238); Boston, MA
Patriot League Women's Tournament
Mar 9, 2019; 2:00 pm	(8)	(9) Navy; First Round	W 58–45	7–23	Reitz Arena (242); Baltimore, MD
Mar 11, 2019; 6:00 pm	(8)	at (1) Bucknell; Quarterfinals	L 63–88	7–24	Sojka Pavilion (846); Lewisburg, PA
*Non-conference game. ^{#}Rankings from AP Poll. (#) Tournament seedings in parentheses. All times are in Eastern Time.

== See also ==
- 2018–19 Loyola Greyhounds men's basketball team
