= 2018–19 Army Black Knights women's basketball team =

Intercollegiate basketball season

2018–19 Army Black Knights women's basketball
- Conference: Patriot League
- Record: 11–19 (6–12 Patriot)
- Head coach: Dave Magarity (13th season)
- Assistant coaches: Lisa Strack; Ben Chase; Liz Flooks; Heather Stec
- Home arena: Christl Arena

2018–19 Patriot League women's basketball standings
| | Conf. | | | | Overall |
| Team | W | | L | PCT | W | | L | PCT |
|---|---|---|---|---|---|---|---|---|
| Bucknell † | 16 | – | 2 | .889 | 28 | – | 6 | .824 |
| American | 16 | – | 2 | .889 | 22 | – | 11 | .667 |
| Lehigh | 12 | – | 6 | .667 | 21 | – | 10 | .677 |
| Boston University | 11 | – | 7 | .611 | 15 | – | 14 | .517 |
| Holy Cross | 9 | – | 9 | .500 | 18 | – | 13 | .581 |
| Colgate | 8 | – | 10 | .444 | 12 | – | 17 | .414 |
| Army | 6 | – | 12 | .333 | 11 | – | 19 | .367 |
| Navy | 5 | – | 13 | .278 | 10 | – | 19 | .345 |
| Loyola (MD) | 5 | – | 13 | .278 | 7 | – | 24 | .226 |
| Lafayette | 2 | – | 16 | .111 | 8 | – | 23 | .258 |
† 2019 Patriot League tournament winner As of March 22, 2019; Rankings from AP poll

The 2018–19 Army Black Knights women's basketball team represented the United States Military Academy during the 2018–19 NCAA Division I women's basketball season. The Black Knights, led by thirteenth year head coach Dave Magarity, played their home games at Christl Arena and were members of the Patriot League. They finished the season 11–19, 6–12 in Patriot League play to finish in seventh place. They lost in the quarterfinals of the Patriot League women's tournament to Lafayette.

== Roster ==
2018–19 Army Black Knights women's basketball team
Players
Coaches

| Pos. | # | Name | Height | Year | Previous school | Hometown |
|---|---|---|---|---|---|---|
| G | 0 | Gabby White | 5 ft 7 in (1.7 m) | So | North Royalton | Cleveland, OH |
| G | 1 | Cori Schnell | 5 ft 8 in (1.73 m) | Jr | Prince of Peace Christian School | Plano, TX |
| G | 2 | Morgann Yancey | 5 ft 8 in (1.73 m) | Jr | Plano West | Dallas, TX |
| G | 3 | Jess Lewis (C) | 5 ft 9 in (1.75 m) | Sr | Regis Jesuit | Denver, CO |
| G | 10 | Sarah Bohn | 5 ft 7 in (1.7 m) | Fr | Gilmour Academy | Broadview Heights, OH |
| G | 12 | Maddie Allen | 5 ft 9 in (1.75 m) | Fr | Papillion-La Vista South | Omaha, NE |
| F | 13 | Lindsey Scamman | 6 ft 0 in (1.83 m) | Fr | Twentynine Palms | Twentynine Palms, CA |
| F | 15 | Kate Murray | 6 ft 0 in (1.83 m) | Fr | Eagle | Boise, ID |
| F | 20 | Sarah Furch | 6 ft 0 in (1.83 m) | Fr | Saint John Vianney | Hazlet, NJ |
| F | 23 | Taylor Sullivan | 6 ft 3 in (1.91 m) | Fr | Capital | Helena, MT |
| G | 24 | Natalie Stralkus | 5 ft 11 in (1.8 m) | Fr | The Peddie School | East Brunswick, NJ |
| F | 25 | Jessica Rawls | 6 ft 0 in (1.83 m) | So | Central Dauphin East Senior | Harrisburg, PA |
| G | 31 | Alisa Fallon | 5 ft 10 in (1.78 m) | Fr | Main West | Des Plaines, IL |
| F | 33 | Liz Layne | 6 ft 0 in (1.83 m) | So | Elkhorn South | Omaha, NE |
| F | 34 | Julia Gibbs | 5 ft 10 in (1.78 m) | Jr | Mills | Millbrae, CA |
| F | 41 | Madison Hovren | 5 ft 11 in (1.8 m) | Sr | Central Valley | Spokane, WA |
| G | 44 | Libby Tacka | 5 ft 9 in (1.75 m) | Jr | Mount Saint Joseph Academy | Blue Bell, PA |

Head coach

- Dave Magarity (Saint Francis (PA))

Assistant coach(es)

- Lisa Strack (American)
- Ben Chase (Emerson)
- Liz Flooks (Niagara)
- Heather Stec (Siena)

Legend

- (C) Team captain
- (S) Suspended
- (I) Ineligible
- (W) Walk-on
- Injured
- Current redshirt

Roster

== Schedule ==
| Date time, TV | Rank^{#} | Opponent^{#} | Result | Record | Site (attendance) city, state |
Exhibition
| Nov 2, 2018*; 6:00 pm | | Saint Leo | W 72–38 | | Christl Arena; West Point, NY |
Non-conference regular season
| Nov 9, 2018*; 5:00 pm | | at LIU Brooklyn | W 57–42 | 1–0 | Steinberg Wellness Center (367); Brooklyn, NY |
| Nov 12, 2018*; 7:00 pm | | at Columbia | L 49–70 | 1–1 | Levien Gymnasium (378); New York, NY |
| Nov 16, 2018*; 5:00 pm | | St. John's | L 49–60 | 1–2 | Christl Arena (640); West Point, NY |
| Nov 21, 2018*; 5:00 pm | | Air Force | L 60–71 | 1–3 | Christl Arena (913); West Point, NY |
| Nov 25, 2018*; 2:00 pm | | at Binghamton | L 47–60 | 1–4 | Binghamton University Events Center (1,007); Vestal, NY |
| Nov 28, 2018*; 5:00 pm | | St. Francis Brooklyn | W 69–57 | 2–4 | Christl Arena (650); West Point, NY |
| Dec 2, 2018*; 3:00 pm, FSSW | | at TCU; Maggie Dixon Classic | L 38–63 | 2–5 | Schollmaier Arena (2,154); Fort Worth, TX |
| Dec 5, 2018*; 7:00 pm | | Fairleigh Dickinson | W 62–40 | 3–5 | Christl Arena (409); West Point, NY |
| Dec 8, 2018*; 1:00 pm | | at Wagner | W 61–46 | 4–5 | Spiro Sports Center (495); Staten Island, NY |
| Dec 11, 2018*; 7:00 pm | | Yale | L 51–62 | 4–6 | Christl Arena (358); West Point, NY |
| Dec 30, 2018*; 1:00 pm | | Connecticut College | W 74–48 | 5–6 | Christl Arena (570); West Point, NY |
Patriot League regular season
| Jan 3, 2019; 7:00 pm | | at Boston University | L 51–63 | 5–7 (0–1) | Case Gym (280); Boston, MA |
| Jan 6, 2019; 1:00 pm | | Loyola (MD) | W 69–57 | 6–7 (1–1) | Christl Arena (765); West Point, NY |
| Jan 9, 2019; 7:00 pm | | Bucknell | L 52–66 | 6–8 (1–2) | Christl Arena (522); West Point, NY |
| Jan 12, 2019; 1:00 pm | | at American | L 51–61 | 6–9 (1–3) | Bender Arena (644); Washington, D.C. |
| Jan 16, 2019; 11:00 am | | Lafayette | W 65–50 | 7–9 (2–3) | Christl Arena (1,540); West Point, NY |
| Jan 19, 2019; 11:00 am, CBSSN | | Navy | W 55–52 | 8–9 (3–3) | Christl Arena (5,013); West Point, NY |
| Jan 23, 2019; 6:00 pm | | at Holy Cross | L 39–58 | 8–10 (3–4) | Hart Center (778); Worcester, MA |
| Jan 26, 2019; 1:00 pm | | Lehigh | L 50–73 | 8–11 (3–5) | Christl Arena (735); West Point, NY |
| Jan 30, 2019; 7:00 pm | | Colgate | L 58–70 | 8–12 (3–6) | Christl Arena (407); West Point, NY |
| Feb 2, 2019; 2:00 pm | | at Loyola (MD) | L 51–70 | 8–13 (3–7) | Reitz Arena (619); Baltimore, MD |
| Feb 9, 2019; 1:00 pm | | American | L 62–75 | 8–14 (3–8) | Christl Arena (427); West Point, NY |
| Feb 13, 2019; 7:00 pm | | at Lafayette | W 64–40 | 9–14 (4–8) | Kirby Sports Center (322); Easton, PA |
| Feb 16, 2019; 12:00 pm, CBSSN | | at Navy | W 60–48 | 10–14 (5–8) | Alumni Hall (5,548); Annapolis, MD |
| Feb 20, 2019; 7:00 pm | | Holy Cross | W 60–53 | 11–14 (6–8) | Christl Arena (486); West Point, NY |
| Feb 23, 2019; 7:30 pm | | at Lehigh | L 46–55 | 11–15 (6–9) | Stabler Arena (757); Bethlehem, PA |
| Feb 27, 2019; 8:30 pm | | at Colgate | L 80–85 | 11–16 (6–10) | Cotterell Court (219); Hamilton, NY |
| Mar 2, 2019; 3:00 pm | | Boston University | L 42–67 | 11–17 (6–11) | Christl Arena (539); West Point, NY |
| Mar 6, 2019; 6:00 pm | | at Bucknell | L 66–84 | 11–18 (6–12) | Sojka Pavilion (705); Lewisburg, PA |
Patriot League Women's Tournament
| Mar 9, 2019; 1:00 pm | (7) | (10) Lafayette; First Round | L 61–63 | 11–19 | Christl Arena (197); West Point, NY |
*Non-conference game. ^{#}Rankings from AP Poll. (#) Tournament seedings in parentheses. All times are in Eastern Time.

== Rankings ==
2018–19 NCAA Division I women's basketball rankings

| + Regular season polls | Poll | Pre- Season | Week 2 | Week 3 | Week 4 | Week 5 | Week 6 | Week 7 | Week 8 | Week 9 | Week 10 | Week 11 | Week 12 | Week 13 | Week 14 | Week 15 | Week 16 | Week 17 | Week 18 | Week 19 | Final |
| AP | | | | | | | | | | | | | | | | | | | | N/A | |
| Coaches | | | | | | | | | | | | | | | | | | | | | |

Legend
| | Increase in ranking |
| | Decrease in ranking |
| | No change |
| (RV) | Received votes |
| (NR) | Not ranked |

== See also ==
2018–19 Army Black Knights men's basketball team
