= 2018–19 Boston University Terriers women's basketball team =

Intercollegiate basketball season

2018–19 Boston University Terriers women's basketball
- Conference: Patriot League
- Record: 15–14 (11–7 Patriot)
- Head coach: Marisa Moseley (1st season)
- Assistant coaches: Darren Bennett; Kate Barnosky; Elizabeth Belanger
- Home arena: Case Gym

2018–19 Patriot League women's basketball standings
	Conf.				Overall
Team	W		L	PCT	W		L	PCT
Bucknell †	16	–	2	.889	28	–	6	.824
American	16	–	2	.889	22	–	11	.667
Lehigh	12	–	6	.667	21	–	10	.677
Boston University	11	–	7	.611	15	–	14	.517
Holy Cross	9	–	9	.500	18	–	13	.581
Colgate	8	–	10	.444	12	–	17	.414
Army	6	–	12	.333	11	–	19	.367
Navy	5	–	13	.278	10	–	19	.345
Loyola (MD)	5	–	13	.278	7	–	24	.226
Lafayette	2	–	16	.111	8	–	23	.258
† 2019 Patriot League tournament winner As of March 22, 2019; Rankings from AP poll

The 2018–19 Boston University Terriers women's basketball team represented Boston University during the 2018–19 NCAA Division I women's basketball season. The Terries were led by first-year head coach Marisa Moseley, played their home games at Case Gym and were members of the Patriot League. They finished the season 15–14, 11–7 in Patriot League play, to finish in fourth place. They lost in the quarterfinals of the Patriot League women's tournament to Holy Cross.

== Roster ==
2018–19 Boston University Terriers women's basketball team
Players
Coaches

Pos.	#	Name	Height	Year	Previous school	Hometown
G	2	Katie Nelson	5 ft 8 in (1.73 m)	So	Bishop Feehan	Falmouth, MA
F	3	Naiyah Thompson	5 ft 11 in (1.8 m)	Sr	St. Mary's Ryken	Leonardtown, MD
G	4	Payton Hauck	5 ft 9 in (1.75 m)	Sr	Northeastern	York, PA
F	5	Chiara Tibbitt	6 ft 1 in (1.85 m)	Fr	Rutgers Prep	Somerset, NJ
F	10	Ashley Sieper	6 ft 2 in (1.88 m)	Fr	Tampa Catholic	Tampa, FL
F	20	Nia Irving	6 ft 1 in (1.85 m)	Jr	Lawrence	Fairfield, ME
G	21	Lauren Spearman	5 ft 7 in (1.7 m)	Sr	Marlborough School	Los Angeles, CA
G	23	Tenisha Pressley	5 ft 9 in (1.75 m)	So	Gloucester Catholic	Deptford, NJ
F	25	Riley Childs	6 ft 0 in (1.83 m)	Fr	Medway	Medway, MA
G	30	Vanessa Edgehill	5 ft 8 in (1.73 m)	Jr	The Rivers School	Franklin, MA
F	44	Audrey Nicholson	6 ft 3 in (1.91 m)	Fr	Catalina Foothills	Tucson, AZ
F	55	Mackenzie Miers	6 ft 2 in (1.88 m)	So	Easton Area	Easton, PA

Head coach

- Marisa Moseley (Boston University)

Assistant coach(es)

- Darren Bennett (Springfield)
- Kate Barnosky (Tufts)
- Elizabeth Belanger (New Hampshire)

Legend

- (C) Team captain
- (S) Suspended
- (I) Ineligible
- (W) Walk-on
- Injured
- Current redshirt

Roster
Last update: July 19, 2024

== Schedule ==
Date time, TV	Rank^{#}	Opponent^{#}	Result	Record	Site (attendance) city, state
Non-conference regular season
November 9, 2018*; 12:00 p.m.		at Northeastern	L 51–81	0–1	Cabot Center (942); Boston, MA
November 12, 2018*; 7:00 p.m., NESN		Brown	W 72–51	1–1	Case Gym (471); Boston, MA
November 16, 2018*; 7:00 p.m., ESPN+		at Marist	L 57–68	1–2	McCann Arena (1,526); Poughkeepsie, NY
November 20, 2018*; 7:00 p.m.		Bryant	W 67–65	2–2	Case Gym (295); Boston, MA
November 28, 2018*; 7:00 p.m., NESN+		New Hampshire	W 60–39	3–2	Case Gym (284); Boston, MA
December 1, 2018*; 1:00 p.m.		Delaware	W 72–61	4–2	Case Gym (362); Boston, MA
December 5, 2018*; 12:00 p.m.		at Dartmouth	L 44–64	4–3	Leede Arena (1,743); Hanover, NH
December 12, 2018*; 7:00 p.m., ESPN+		at Massachusetts	L 55–66	4–4	Mullins Center (518); Amherst, MA
December 16, 2018*; 4:00 p.m., ACCNX		at Boston College; Green Line Rivalry	L 51–78	4–5	Conte Forum (887); Chestnut Hill, MA
December 21, 2018*; 4:00 p.m., NESN		at Harvard	L 47–67	4–6	Lavietes Pavilion (556); Cambridge, MA
Patriot League regular season
January 3, 2019; 7:00 p.m.		Army	W 63–51	5–6 (1–0)	Case Gym (280); Boston, MA
January 6, 2019; 2:00 p.m.		at Bucknell	W 70–62	6–6 (2–0)	Sojka Pavilion (1,452); Lewisburg, PA
January 9, 2019; 11:30 a.m.		at Loyola (MD)	W 64–62 ^{OT}	7–6 (3–0)	Reitz Arena (767); Baltimore, MD
January 12, 2019; 4:00 p.m.		Lehigh	W 58–45	8–6 (4–0)	Case Gym (604); Boston, MA
January 16, 2019; 7:00 p.m.		Colgate	L 72–81	8–7 (4–1)	Case Gym (319); Boston, MA
January 19, 2019; 3:00 p.m.		at Holy Cross; Rivalry	L 69–75	8–8 (4–2)	Hart Center (928); Worcester, MA
January 23, 2019; 7:30 p.m.		American	L 51–64	8–9 (4–3)	Case Gym (783); Boston, MA
January 26, 2019; 4:00 p.m.		at Navy	W 49–35	9–9 (5–3)	Alumni Hall (849); Annapolis, MD
January 30, 2019; 6:00 p.m.		at Lafayette	W 47–44	10–9 (6–3)	Kirby Sports Center (646); Easton, PA
February 2, 2019; 2:00 p.m.		Bucknell	L 58–62	10–10 (6–4)	Case Gym (538); Boston, MA
February 9, 2019; 4:00 p.m.		at Lehigh	W 52–48	11–10 (7–4)	Stabler Arena; Bethlehem, PA
February 13, 2019; 7:00 p.m.		at Colgate	W 61–53	12–10 (8–4)	Cotterell Court (271); Hamilton, NY
February 16, 2019; 2:00 p.m.		Holy Cross; Rivalry	L 61–64	12–11 (8–5)	Case Gym; Boston, MA
February 20, 2019; 11:30 a.m.		at American	L 48–50	12–12 (8–6)	Bender Arena (349); Washington, D.C.
February 23, 2019; 2:00 p.m.		Navy	W 66–55	13–12 (9–6)	Case Gym (1,054); Boston, MA
February 27, 2019; 7:00 p.m., NESN		Lafayette	W 50–49	14–12 (10–6)	Case Gym (280); Boston, MA
March 2, 2019; 3:00 p.m.		at Army	W 67–42	15–12 (11–6)	Christl Arena (539); West Point, NY
March 7, 2019; 7:00 p.m.		Bucknell	L 55–59	15–13 (11–7)	Case Gym (238); Boston, MA
Patriot League women's tournament
March 11, 2019; 7:00 p.m.	(4)	(5) Holy Cross; Quarterfinals	L 70–72	15–14	Case Gym (490); Boston, MA
*Non-conference game. ^{#}Rankings from AP poll. (#) Tournament seedings in parentheses. All times are in Eastern.

== See also ==
- 2018–19 Boston University Terriers men's basketball team
