= Kate J. Brainard =

American musical educator (1835–1918)

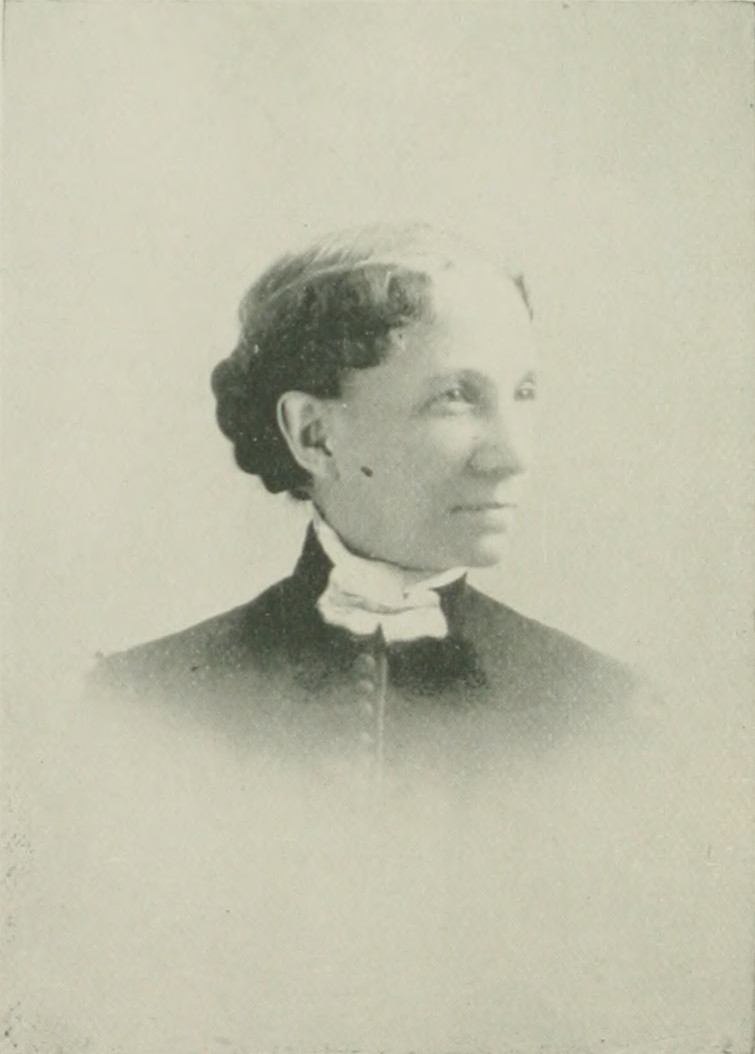
Kate J. Brainard

Kate J. Brainard (February 18, 1835 - January 14, 1918) was an American musical educator.

== Early life ==
Kate Jones was born in New York City, on February 18, 1835. Her father. Rev. Darius K. Jones, compiler of the first hymn and tune book ever used and made popular in the United States, was of Welsh descent. Her mother, Ann Letts, was reportedly a woman of great natural gifts, both of voice and mind, and a regular contributor to the literature of the day. The daughter inherited her parents' musical talents.

As a child, she studied the elements of music under her father and began piano lessons when seven years old. At an early age she surprised her friends by carrying the alto in part-singing, "making it up" with wonderful correctness. At fifteen she was obliged to begin to earn her living by teaching piano. At the same time her musical studies were faithfully carried on under the best masters. Vocal lessons were begun at that time and she made rapid progress in florid singing. Her last year in the East was spent with the best vocal teachers in Boston.

== Career ==
In 1855 Kate Jones moved to Chicago and there became noted as a vocalist. In 1858 she married Ira Shaler Brainard (1825-1910), and in 1865 moved to St. Louis, Missouri, where she was looked upon as one of the leading sopranos, receiving a large salary in one of the choirs.

In 1866 Brainard assumed charge of the music in Mary Institute, the female department of Washington University, numbering at the time nearly four-hundred girls. Brainard's class-work was systematized and developed in that institute. During her career in Mary Institute, she frequently spent her vacations in the East with some prominent teacher, to obtain new ideas for her work. Among these was a trip to Europe, where she studied in Paris and London with Pauline Viardot, Manuel Garcia and Charlotte Sainton-Dolby.

Many girls with promising voices had been started on their musical career by Brainard. For twenty-five years her name was associated with the progress of musical art in St. Louis, and many singers referred to her as their conscientious guide during their struggles and studies.

She was deeply and actively interested in church work since she was thirteen years old, at which time she united with Dr. Hatfield's church in New York City.

She died on January 14, 1918, in St. Louis and was cremated.
