= 2018–19 Lehigh Mountain Hawks women's basketball team =

Intercollegiate basketball season

2018–19 Lehigh Mountain Hawks women's basketball
- Conference: Patriot League
- Record: 21–10 (12–6 Patriot)
- Head coach: Sue Troyan (24th season)
- Assistant coaches: Glenn Rigney; Caitlin Gillard; Ariel Braker
- Home arena: Stabler Arena

2018–19 Patriot League women's basketball standings
	Conf.				Overall
Team	W		L	PCT	W		L	PCT
Bucknell †	16	–	2	.889	28	–	6	.824
American	16	–	2	.889	22	–	11	.667
Lehigh	12	–	6	.667	21	–	10	.677
Boston University	11	–	7	.611	15	–	14	.517
Holy Cross	9	–	9	.500	18	–	13	.581
Colgate	8	–	10	.444	12	–	17	.414
Army	6	–	12	.333	11	–	19	.367
Navy	5	–	13	.278	10	–	19	.345
Loyola (MD)	5	–	13	.278	7	–	24	.226
Lafayette	2	–	16	.111	8	–	23	.258
† 2019 Patriot League tournament winner As of March 22, 2019; Rankings from AP poll

The 2018–19 Lehigh Mountain Hawks women's basketball team represented Lehigh University during the 2018–19 NCAA Division I women's basketball season. The Mountain Hawks, led by twenty-fourth year head coach Sue Troyan, played their home games at Stabler Arena and were members of the Patriot League. They finished the season 21–10, 12–6 in Patriot League play to finish in second place. They advanced to the semifinals of the Patriot League women's tournament, where they lost to American. Despite having 21 wins and a better record, they were not invited to a postseason tournament.

== Roster ==
2018–19 Lehigh Mountain Hawks women's basketball team
Players
Coaches

Pos.	#	Name	Height	Year	Previous school	Hometown
G	3	Clair Steele	5 ft 5 in (1.65 m)	Fr	Miramonte	Orinda, CA
G	5	Katie Rice	5 ft 11 in (1.8 m)	Fr	Red Bank Catholic	Red Bank, NJ
G	10	Megan Walker	5 ft 10 in (1.78 m)	Fr	Minnetonka	Rogers, MN
F	11	Emily Johnson	6 ft 1 in (1.85 m)	So	Archbishop Molloy	Franklin Square, NY
F	12	Gena Grundhoffer	6 ft 1 in (1.85 m)	Jr	Assumption	Wisconsin Rapids, WI
C	13	Meagan Eripret	6 ft 3 in (1.91 m)	Sr	Salisbury	Allentown, PA
G	14	Paige Galiani	5 ft 10 in (1.78 m)	Jr	Langley	Great Falls, VA
G	15	Camryn Buhr	6 ft 1 in (1.85 m)	Jr	Penn	Mishawaka, IN
G	22	Hannah Hedstrom	5 ft 9 in (1.75 m)	Jr	Minnetonka	Minnetonka, MN
F	24	Bryce Menendez	6 ft 2 in (1.88 m)	Sr	Neuqua Valley	Naperville, IL
F	25	Emma Grothaus	6 ft 3 in (1.91 m)	Fr	Mahtomedi	Mahtomedi, MN
F	30	Cameryn Benz	6 ft 3 in (1.91 m)	Jr	Montgomery	Montgomery, NJ
G	33	Hailey Pascoe	5 ft 9 in (1.75 m)	Sr	Clayton Valley	Concord, CA
F	34	Mariah Sexe	6 ft 2 in (1.88 m)	So	East Ridge	Woodbury, MN
G	44	Mary Clougherty	6 ft 0 in (1.83 m)	So	Chantilly	Herndon, VA

Head coach

- Sue Troyan (Dickinson)

Assistant coach(es)

- Glenn Rigney (Miami (FL))
- Caitlin Gillard (Colgate)
- Ariel Braker (Notre Dame)

Legend

- (C) Team captain
- (S) Suspended
- (I) Ineligible
- (W) Walk-on
- Injured
- Current redshirt

Roster

== Schedule ==
Date time, TV	Rank^{#}	Opponent^{#}	Result	Record	Site (attendance) city, state
Non-conference regular season
Nov 6, 2018*; 6:00 pm		Kutztown	W 73–39	1–0	Stabler Arena (464); Bethlehem, PA
Nov 10, 2018*; 11:00 am		at Central Connecticut	W 88–62	2–0	William H. Detrick Gymnasium (687); New Britain, CT
Nov 13, 2018*; 11:00 am		Monmouth	W 63–48	3–0	Stabler Arena (4,549); Bethlehem, PA
Nov 16, 2018*; 6:00 pm		Villanova	L 48–70	3–1	Stabler Arena (957); Bethlehem, PA
Nov 21, 2018*; 1:00 pm		at Binghamton	W 65–55	4–1	Binghamton University Events Center (1,016); Vestal, NY
Nov 24, 2018*; 2:00 pm		Norfolk State; Lehigh Christmas City Classic semifinals	W 62–41	5–1	Stabler Arena (536); Bethlehem, PA
Nov 25, 2018*; 4:30 pm		Charlotte; Lehigh Christmas City Classic championship	L 60–62	5–2	Stabler Arena (489); Bethlehem, PA
Nov 29, 2018*; 6:00 pm		Cornell	W 67–54	6–2	Stabler Arena (482); Bethlehem, PA
Dec 8, 2018*; 2:00 pm		Sacred Heart	W 70–66	7–2	Stabler Arena (451); Bethlehem, PA
Dec 20, 2018*; 6:00 pm		LIU Brooklyn	W 73–38	8–2	Stabler Arena (466); Bethlehem, PA
Dec 30, 2018*; 1:00 pm, ACCNE		at No. 2 Notre Dame	L 68–95	8–3	Edmund P. Joyce Center (9,149); South Bend, IN
Patriot League regular season
Jan 3, 2019; 7:00 pm		at Lafayette	W 70–43	9–3 (1–0)	Kirby Sports Center (588); Easton, PA
Jan 6, 2019; 3:30 pm		at Navy	W 56–38	10–3 (2–0)	Alumni Hall (1,236); Annapolis, MD
Jan 9, 2019; 6:00 pm, SE2		Holy Cross	W 64–55	11–3 (3–0)	Stabler Arena (604); Bethlehem, PA
Jan 12, 2019; 4:00 pm		at Boston University	L 45–58	11–4 (3–1)	Case Gym (604); Boston, MA
Jan 16, 2019; 6:00 pm		at Bucknell	L 53–71	11–5 (3–2)	Sojka Pavilion (1,033); Lewisburg, PA
Jan 19, 2019; 4:30 pm, SE2		American	L 53–61	11–6 (3–3)	Stabler Arena (1,558); Bethlehem, PA
Jan 23, 2019; 6:00 pm, SE2		Colgate	W 86–58	12–6 (4–3)	Stabler Arena (464); Bethlehem, PA
Jan 26, 2019; 1:00 pm		at Army	W 73–50	13–6 (5–3)	Christl Arena (735); West Point, NY
Jan 30, 2019; 6:00 pm, SE2		Loyola (MD)	W 51–42	14–6 (6–3)	Stabler Arena (420); Bethlehem, PA
Feb 2, 2019; 2:00 pm, SE2		Navy	W 66–55	15–6 (7–3)	Stabler Arena (620); Bethlehem, PA
Feb 9, 2019; 2:00 pm, SE2		Boston University	L 48–52	15–7 (7–4)	Stabler Arena; Bethlehem, PA
Feb 13, 2019; 6:00 pm, SE2		Bucknell	L 68–73	15–8 (7–5)	Stabler Arena (616); Bethlehem, PA
Feb 16, 2019; 12:00 pm		at American	L 47–50	15–9 (7–6)	Bender Arena (574); Washington, D.C.
Feb 20, 2019; 7:00 pm		at Colgate	W 75–63	16–9 (8–6)	Cotterell Court (217); Hamilton, NY
Feb 23, 2019; 7:30 pm, SE2		Army	W 55–46	17–9 (9–6)	Stabler Arena (757); Bethlehem, PA
Feb 27, 2019; 6:00 pm		at Loyola (MD)	W 65–46	18–9 (10–6)	Reitz Arena (275); Baltimore, MD
Mar 2, 2019; 6:00 pm, SE2		Lafayette	W 67–50	19–9 (11–6)	Stabler Arena (918); Bethlehem, PA
Mar 6, 2019; 6:00 pm		at Holy Cross	W 79–74 ^{OT}	20–9 (12–6)	Hart Center (632); Worcester, MA
Patriot League Women's Tournament
Mar 11, 2019; 6:00 pm, SE2	(3)	(6) Colgate; Quarterfinals	W 78–68	21–9	Stabler Arena (535); Bethlehem, PA
Mar 14, 2019; 7:00 pm	(3)	at (2) American; Semifinals	L 57–68	21–10	Bender Arena (393); Washington, D.C.
*Non-conference game. ^{#}Rankings from AP Poll. (#) Tournament seedings in parentheses. All times are in Eastern Time.

== See also ==
- 2018–19 Lehigh Mountain Hawks men's basketball team
