= Marisa Moseley =

American collegiate basketball coach

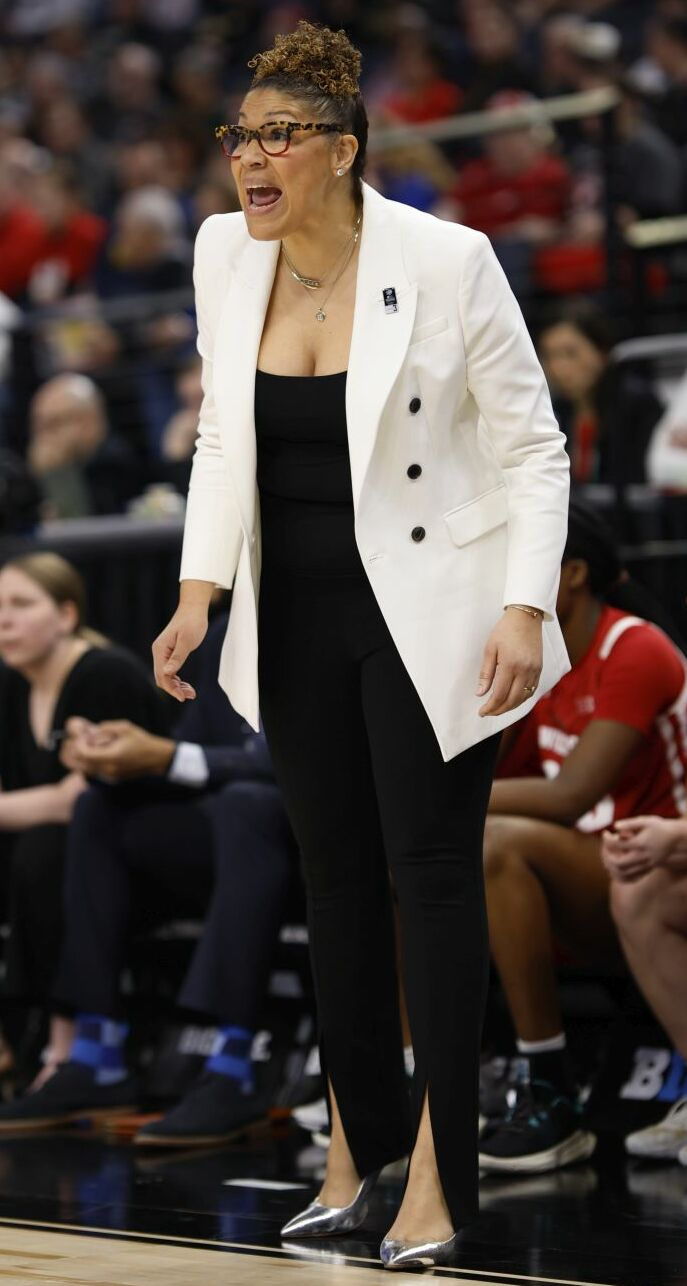
- Moseley during the 2023 Big Ten women's basketball tournament

Biographical details
- Born: March 12, 1982 (age 44); Springfield, Massachusetts, U.S.

Playing career
- 2000–2004: Boston University

Coaching career (HC unless noted)
- 2005–2007: Denver (assistant)
- 2007–2009: Minnesota (assistant)
- 2009–2018: UConn (assistant)
- 2018–2021: Boston University
- 2021–2025: Wisconsin

Head coaching record
- Overall: 93–102 (.477)

Marisa Moseley (born March 12, 1982) is an American basketball coach. She was announced on March 25, 2021 as the eighth head coach in the history of the Wisconsin Badgers women's basketball team. She resigned her position on March 9, 2025. She was previously the head coach of the Boston University Terriers women's basketball team, where she compiled a 45–29 record. Mosely was an assistant for the UConn Huskies women's basketball team under coaches Geno Auriemma and Chris Dailey. The Huskies won five national championships while Mosely was on the UConn coaching staff, losing only 15 games during her ten year tenure.

== Career statistics ==
Legend
GP	Games played	GS	Games started	MPG	Minutes per game	FG%	Field goal percentage
3P%	3-point field goal percentage	FT%	Free throw percentage	RPG	Rebounds per game	APG	Assists per game
SPG	Steals per game	BPG	Blocks per game	TO	Turnovers per game	PPG	Points per game
**Bold**	Career high	°	Led conference

=== College ===
Year	Team	GP	GS	MPG	FG%	3P%	FT%	RPG	APG	SPG	BPG	TO	PPG
2000–01	Boston University	29			**44.1**	**100**	**69.4**	4.5	1.4	0.9	0.9		6.4
2001–02	Boston University	27			36.0	0	50.0	5.6	1.6	1.2	**1.3**		**8.0**
2002–03	Boston University	**31**°		**30.0**	37.4	0	53.5	**5.7**	**2.3**	**2.4**°	**1.3**	2.8	7.1
2003–04	Boston University	25		24.6	35.6		50.0	5.4	1.8	1.5	0.6	**2.4**	5.6
**Career**		112		27.6	37.9	16.7	55.8	5.3	1.8	1.5	1.0	2.6	6.8
Statistics retrieved from Sports-Reference.

== Head coaching record ==
Record table
Season	Team	Overall	Conference	Standing	Postseason
Boston University Terriers (Patriot League) (2018–2021)
2018–19	Boston University	15–14	11–7	4th	
2019–20	Boston University	18–12	12–6	2nd	
2020–21	Boston University	12–3	10–2	1st (North)	
Boston University:		45–29 (.608)	33–15 (.688)		
Wisconsin Badgers (Big Ten Conference) (2021–2025)
2021–22	Wisconsin	8–21	5–13	T–11th	
2022–23	Wisconsin	11–20	6–12	10th	
2023–24	Wisconsin	15–17	6–12	10th	WNIT Great 8
2024–25	Wisconsin	13–17	4–14	14th	
Wisconsin:		47–63 (.427)	21–50 (.296)		
Total:		93–102 (.477)			
National champion Postseason invitational champion Conference regular season champion Conference regular season and conference tournament champion Division regular season champion Division regular season and conference tournament champion Conference tournament champion
