= Mary Institute and St. Louis Country Day School =

Private school in Ladue, Missouri, US

Coordinates: 38.659561°N 90.40°W

MICDS (Mary Institute and Saint Louis Country Day School)

Location
- 101 North Warson Road; Ladue, (St. Louis County), Missouri 63124; United States

Information
- Former names: Mary Institute, St. Louis Country Day School
- School type: Private elementary, middle, and high school
- Established: 1859 as Mary Institute; 1917 as St. Louis Country Day School; 1992 as Mary Institute and St. Louis Country Day School
- Founder: William Greenleaf Eliot
- Head of school: Chelle Wabrek
- Faculty: 136.5 (on an FTE basis)
- Grades: JK–12
- Enrollment: 1,253 (2023–24)
- Student to teacher ratio: 8.9
- Hours in school day: 8:00 a.m. - 3:15 p.m.
- Campus size: 110 acres (45 ha)
- Campus type: Suburban
- Colors: Cardinal red, Forest green
- Athletics conference: Metro League
- Nickname: Rams
- Accreditation: ISACS
- Website: micds.org

MICDS (Mary Institute and Saint Louis Country Day School) is an American secular, co-educational, independent school with approximately 1,250 students from junior kindergarten through grade 12. Its 110-acre (45 ha) campus is located in the St. Louis, Missouri, suburb of Ladue.

Each of the school's three divisions operate somewhat independently as a "school within a school". The Lower School, also referred to as The Ronald S. Beasley School, or "Beasley" for short, is for students in junior kindergarten through grade 4. The MICDS Middle School, grades 5 to 8, is in the former Mary Institute facilities. The Upper School on the former Country Day School campus serves grades 9 through 12.

== History ==
William Greenleaf Eliot, founder and chancellor of Washington University in St. Louis, established predecessor institutions to MICDS in the 1850s as part of the university. A boys' school, Smith Academy, was founded in 1854.

A sister school for girls, Mary Institute, was founded in 1859 and was named for Eliot's late daughter Mary Rhodes Eliot, who had died at 17. In its early years, Mary Institute moved twice within the city of St. Louis; its third building, at the corner of Lake and Waterman, is now New City School.

In 1866, musical educator Kate J. Brainard became a lead professor at the Mary Institute and trained hundreds of girls. Smith Academy closed in June 1917, in part due to the proliferation of private elementary schools and public secondary schools in the area. Three months later, St. Louis Country Day School opened in northwestern St. Louis County. Inspired by the Country Day School movement nationally, it was not related to Smith, although a number of former Smith students enrolled that first year. St. Louis Country Day School's campus was in a bucolic setting reached by electric streetcar, far removed from the noise and grit of the city.

Mary Institute moved to its Ladue campus in 1931 and became independent of Washington University in 1949. The Mary Institute building contains a three-figure bronze sculpture by Cyrus Dallin: Alma Mater, honoring schoolmaster Edmund Hamilton Sears and donated by Eliza Northrop McMillan. By the 1950s, the tranquility of the Country Day campus was disrupted by the growth of the adjacent Lambert–Saint Louis International Airport. St. Louis Country Day School moved to a new campus next to Mary Institute in Ladue in 1958, and eventually sold its old campus to the airport. Eliot's grandson, Nobel Prize laureate T. S. Eliot, who attended Mary Institute's kindergarten and Smith Academy, spoke at Mary Institute's centennial in 1959.

In the 1970s, Mary Institute and Country Day began expanding their long-existing connections, including theatrical cooperation, into academic coordination. This would culminate in the schools' 1992 merger.

St. Louis Country Day headmaster John Johnson, who coordinated the merger, became head of the combined schools. The school observed its sesquicentennial during a celebration that ran from May 11, 2009, to May 11, 2010.

== Athletics ==
MICDS teams have won 32 state championships and 41 district championships.

The school has one of the few high school cycling teams in St. Louis. They competed in the Tour De St. Louis in 2009; two MICDS riders finished with the peloton.

MICDS has an athletic rivalry with the nearby John Burroughs School. MICDS observes its Homecoming on the weekend when all the teams play Burroughs; there is a traditional bonfire and pep rally to inspire team spirit. MICDS also has a cross-state rivalry with The Pembroke Hill School in Kansas City.

Pro Football Hall of Fame inductee Marv Levy began his coaching career here in 1951, staying for two years.

The women's varsity field hockey team won the Midwest Championships in 2013, 2014, and 2015.

Boys' water polo finished third in the state in 2014.

The boys' lacrosse team has won eight state championships, including six straight championships since 2014 under head coach Andy Kay.

== Notable alumni ==
=== Business ===
- Morton May, chairman, May Department Stores
- John McDonnell, chairman, McDonnell-Douglas Corporation
- William F. Ruprecht, CEO, Sotheby's Auction House
- George Herbert Walker IV, chairman and CEO of Neuberger Berman

=== Government and politics ===
- Jasmine Crockett, U.S. representative
- John Danforth, U.S. senator and Episcopal priest
- Thomas Eagleton, U.S. senator and Democratic nominee for vice president of the United States
- William McChesney Martin, Jr., Federal Reserve Bank chairman
- Mark McCloskey, attorney and U.S. Senate candidate
- James W. Symington, U.S. representative
- Alan Webber, mayor of Santa Fe, New Mexico
- Pete Wilson, mayor of San Diego, U.S. senator, and governor of California

=== Sports and entertainment ===
- Mustafa Abdul-Hamid, former professional basketball player
- Drew Baur, co-owner, St. Louis Cardinals
- Graham Bensinger, sports broadcaster
- Joe Buck, sports broadcaster
- Dwight F. Davis, founder of the Davis Cup international tennis competition and U.S. Secretary of War (attended CDS precursor Smith Academy)
- William DeWitt, Jr., owner, St. Louis Cardinals
- Betty Grable (attended, did not graduate), actress and World War II pin-up girl
- Harriet Bland Green, 1936 Olympian in track and field and gold medal winner in the 4x100
- Will Kacmarek, tight end for the Miami Dolphins
- Jim Lee, comic book artist and publisher
- Robby McGehee, 1999 Indianapolis 500 Rookie of the Year
- Vincent Price, actor
- Michael Scherer (American football), football coach at Purdue University
- Devon Windsor, model

=== Arts, sciences, and education ===
- William S. Barker, president of Covenant Theological Seminary (St. Louis), 1977–1984
- Sally Benson, author of Meet Me in St. Louis and Junior Miss
- Louis Daniel Brodsky, poet
- Sterling K. Brown, actor (This Is Us, Black Panther, Marshall)
- Rhoda Campbell Chase, artist and children's book illustrator
- Edmond La Beaume Cherbonnier, professor and scholar of religious studies
- Winston Churchill (novelist), author of Richard Carvel, The Crisis, and The Crossing, among others.
- William Henry Danforth, chancellor, Washington University in St. Louis
- T.S. Eliot, poet (attended CDS precursor Smith Academy)
- Peg Fenwick, screenwriter and playwright
- Irving Fisher, economist, statistician, inventor, and Progressive social campaigner (attended CDS precursor Smith Academy)
- Landon Jones, editor and author
- Shepherd Mead, author, How to Succeed in Business Without Really Trying
- Vincent Price, actor, art historian and collector, gourmet cook
- Nick Reding, journalist and author of Methland: The Death and Life of an American Small Town
- Hadley Richardson, first wife of Ernest Hemingway
- Frederick Seidel, poet
- Margaret M. Barbour Stone, writer
- Peter Taylor, short-story writer and novelist
- Sara Teasdale, poet
- Harry Weber (sculptor)
- Linda Wells, founder and editor-in-chief, Allure magazine; annual guest judge on the Bravo reality television series Shear Genius
