= Margaret M. Barbour Stone =

American writer

- Born: February 27, 1841; St. Louis, Missouri, U.S.
- Died: June 25, 1913 (age 72); St. Louis, Missouri, U.S.
- Other name: Mrs. C. H. Stone
- Occupations: Writer, clubwoman
- Notable work: A Practical Study of the Soul (1901)

Margaret Manson Barbour Stone (February 27, 1841 – June 25, 1913) was an American writer and clubwoman, based in St. Louis, Missouri.

== Early life and education ==
Barbour was born in St. Louis, the daughter of William E. Barbour and Mary C. Berry Barbour. She attended Mary Institute.

== Career ==
Stone was "president and originator" of the Modern Novel Club in 1885. She also created public contests for housework tasks, in the 1890s. Her novel One of "Berrian's" Novels (1890) is set in the 21st-century utopia of Bellamy's Looking Backward (1888); Berrian is a novelist in the Bellamy book. She lectured in New York City, and studied "the domestic problem" in Paris.

Stone spent fifteen years working on her book A Practical Study of the Soul (1901). "I don't think the physicians will agree with what I say, and I am very sure that educational persons will not," she told an interviewer in 1901. The book was described as being "written with the sincerest wish to help humanity to avoid the many wrecks which strew the path of life" and which "may well prove of no little service as an aid in the development of character." "This book impresses one as the work of a woman of vivacious intelligence, fairly serious-minded, a reader of lay philosophy and transcendental essays and adapted to be a leader in culture clubs," noted a reviewer in the Baltimore Sun, who judged the book "not sheer nonsense."

== Publications ==
- One of "Berrian's" Novels (1890)
- The Problem of Domestic Service (1892)
- "To Reading Clubs and Students of Fiction" (1896, pamphlet)
- A Practical Study of the Soul (1901)

== Personal life ==
Barbour married professor Charles Henry Stone in 1862; they had five children; her daughter Jasmine Stone married artist William Van Dresser, and became a writer of children's books. Her daughter Lillian Stone was a playwright, married to writer William Flewellyn Saunders. Her husband died in 1906, and she died in 1913, at the age of 72, at her daughter's home in St. Louis.
