= New City School =

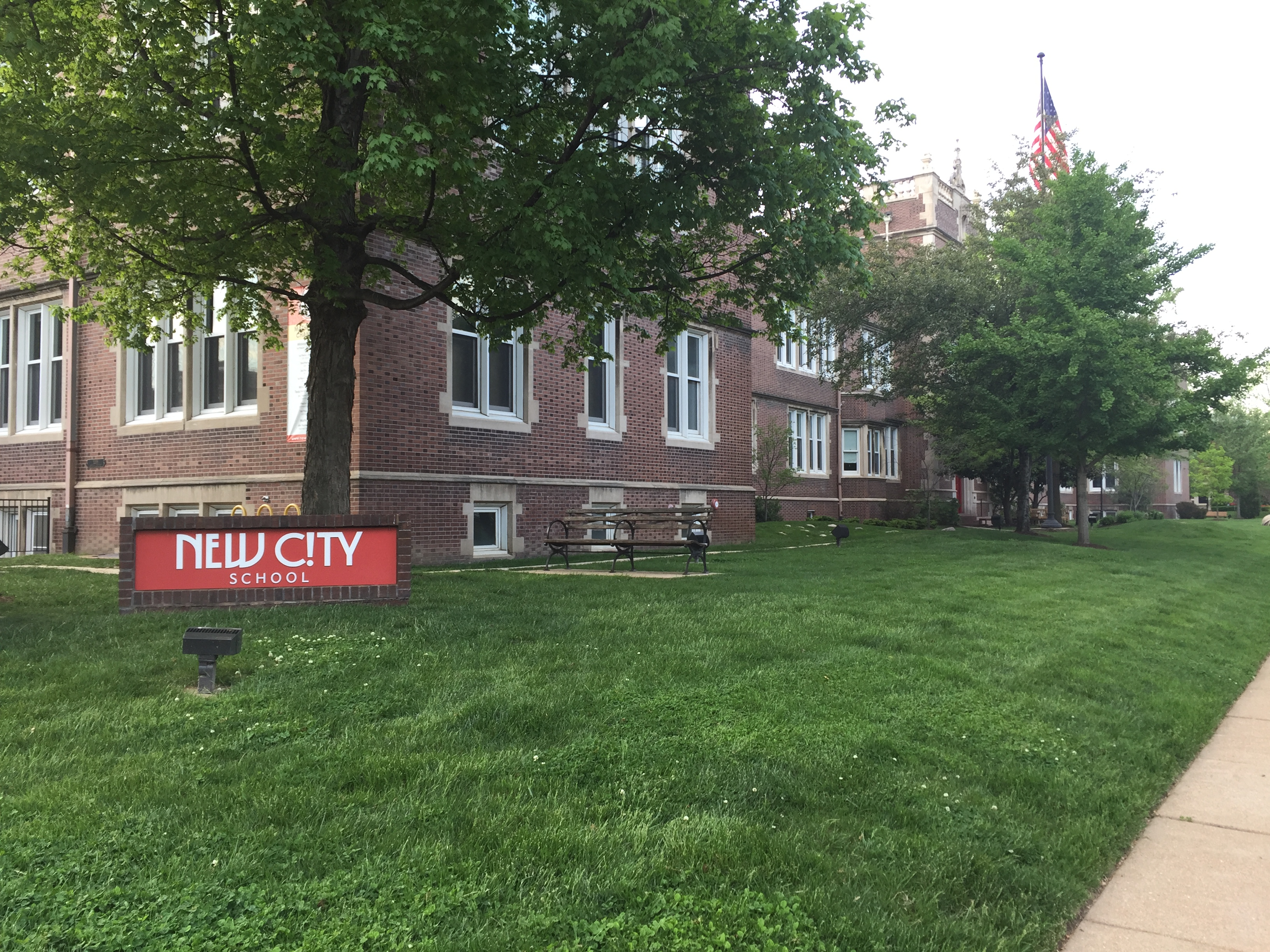
- New City School

Location
- 5209 Waterman Blvd; Saint Louis, Missouri 63108; United States
- 38°38′58″N 90°16′14″W

Information
- Type: Independent school
- Established: 1969
- Head of school: Alexis Wright
- Grades: pre-K to 6
- Website: http://www.newcityschool.org/

New City School is a non-sectarian, co-educational independent elementary school in St. Louis, Missouri. It was founded 1969 in the Central West End neighborhood.

The New City student body is composed of 37% students of color. Its come from 48 different zip codes, and 40% of them receive need-based scholarships.

New City School has 40 full-time and five part-time faculty members,

== History ==
=== 1960s ===
In 1966, the Barat Hall and City House schools in the Central West End neighborhood were closed. A number of parents became concerned about the educational gap left by the schools' closure.

In 1969, New City opened in the First Unitarian Church of St. Louis. The founding head of school was Jerry Glynn. The new school had six teachers and nearly 100 students, with classes from preschool to fourth grade.

=== 1970s ===
In the 1970s, New City School moved to the vacated Lutheran High School building. It was built in 1901 to house the Mary Institute.

In 1971, Charlie Rathbone became head of school, serving until 1972. Len Marks became head in 1974. During this period the school received full accreditation was received from the Independent Schools Association of the Central States (ISACS).

=== 1980s ===
In 1981, Tom Hoerr, a principal from University City, Missouri, became Head of School. In 1983, New City was named an A+ School by Instructor Magazine.

From 1987 to 1988, the school launched a $1,000,000 capital campaign is launched to renovate the building so that all three floors can hold classroom spaces. The faculty begins to pursue implementing multiple intelligences (MI) in 1988.

During the 1980s, the school held four multiple intelligence conferences. The faculty wrote two books,

- Celebrating Multiple Intelligences: Teaching for Success
- Succeeding with Multiple Intelligences: Teaching through the Personal Intelligences.

=== 1990s ===
In 1992, New City School launched a $1,200,000 capital campaign. The school acquired land to create a new playground, soccer field, parking lot and playing field. In 1993, the school created the Financial Aid Endowment Fund ($3,422,000 as of July 2013).

In 1998, New City School renovated the theater and renamed it Founders Hall.

=== 2000s ===
In 2001, News City School opened its Centennial Garden on the playground. In 2005, Howard Gardner, creator of multiple intelligences theory, visited the school to open the first Multiple Intelligences Library.

In 2009, the school installed a green roof over the dining hall. In 2010, Jossey-Bass publishes the faculty's book, Celebrating Every Learner. In 2015, Tom Hoerr retired. He was replaced in 2016 by Alexis Wright.

=== 2020s ===
In the summer of 2022, the school's basement level was damaged by a flood. The school settled on Redesigning the whole basement level, not including the cafeteria and Innovation Lab. It would not be fully refurbished until the start of the 2023–2024 school year. On May 16, 2025, during the last week of the 2024–2025 school year, an EF3 tornado hit the school, causing significant damage that can still be seen today. One of the windows by the science room was broken, and most trees were knocked over. The damage caused resulted in students having 4 days off of school while repairs were made, and a temporary air conditioning unit. As of now, the school is still operating normally.

== Faculty and staff ==
New City School has 40 full-time and five part-time faculty members, including classroom teachers and specialists in science, library, Spanish, art, movement and music, performing arts, physical education and technology, in addition to a learning specialist and school counselor.
