= 2018–19 Tulane Green Wave women's basketball team =

American intercollegiate basketball season

2018–19 Tulane Green Wave women's basketball
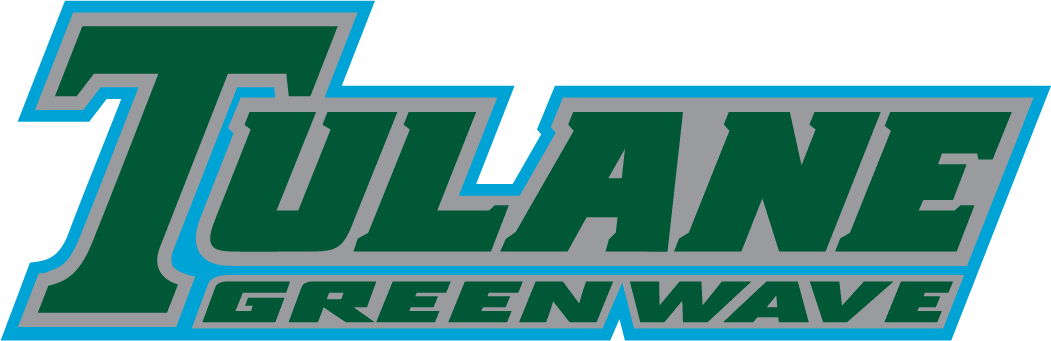
- Conference: American Athletic Conference
- Record: 15–15 (5–11 The American)
- Head coach: Lisa Stockton (25th season)
- Assistant coaches: Alan Frey; Doshia Woods; Beth Dunkenberger
- Home arena: Devlin Fieldhouse

2018–19 American Athletic Conference women's basketball standings
	Conf.				Overall
Team	W		L	PCT	W		L	PCT
No. 2 UConn †	16	–	0	1.000	35	–	3	.921
UCF	13	–	3	.813	26	–	7	.788
Cincinnati	12	–	4	.750	24	–	11	.686
Houston	9	–	7	.563	15	–	16	.484
South Florida	7	–	9	.438	19	–	16	.543
Temple	7	–	9	.438	11	–	18	.379
East Carolina	6	–	10	.375	16	–	15	.516
Tulsa	6	–	10	.375	13	–	18	.419
Tulane	5	–	11	.313	15	–	16	.484
Wichita State	5	–	11	.313	12	–	18	.400
SMU	5	–	11	.313	11	–	19	.367
Memphis	5	–	11	.313	11	–	20	.355
† 2019 AAC tournament winner As of March 17, 2019; Rankings from AP poll

The 2018–19 Tulane Green Wave women's basketball team were an American basketball team who represented Tulane University during the 2018–19 NCAA Division I women's basketball season. The Green Wave, led by twenty-fifth year head coach Lisa Stockton, played their home games at Devlin Fieldhouse and were fifth year members of the American Athletic Conference. They finished the season 15–15, 5–11 in AAC play to finish in a 4-way tie for ninth place. They lost in first round of the American Athletic women's tournament to South Florida.

== Media ==
All Green Wave games will be broadcast on WRBH 88.3 FM. A video stream for all home games will be on Tulane All-Access, ESPN3, or AAC Digital. Road games will typically be streamed on the opponents website, though conference road games could also appear on ESPN3 or AAC Digital.

== Roster ==
2018–19 Tulane Green Wave women's basketball team
Players
Coaches

Pos.	#	Name	Height	Year	Previous school	Hometown
G	1	Kaila Anderson	5 ft 5 in (1.65 m)	So	University Lab	Kenner, LA
G	2	Erin Gutierrez	5 ft 9 in (1.75 m)	Fr	Nova	Pembroke Pines, FL
G	5	Kayla Manuirirangi	5 ft 8 in (1.73 m)	Jr	New Plymouth Girls'	Hawera, New Zealand
G	11	Tatyana Lofton	5 ft 9 in (1.75 m)	Sr	Madison-Ridgeland Academy	Madison, MS
G	12	Sierra Cheatham	6 ft 0 in (1.83 m)	So	Clear Springs	Houston, TX
G	14	Dynah Jones	5 ft 9 in (1.75 m)	Fr	John Curtis	New Orleans, LA
G	22	Meredith Schulte	6 ft 0 in (1.83 m)	Sr	Mill Creek	Brasleton, GA
F	23	Krystal Freeman	6 ft 0 in (1.83 m)	So	Pineville	Pineville, LA
F	24	Maddison Wells	6 ft 1 in (1.85 m)	Jr	Chain of Lakes Collegiate	Winter Haven, FL
F	25	Harlyn Wyatt	6 ft 2 in (1.88 m)	Sr	Benjamin E. Mays	Atlanta, GA
F	30	Dene' Mimms	6 ft 5 in (1.96 m)	Fr	Warren Easton Charter	New Orleans, LA
C	34	Ksenija Madzarevic	6 ft 6 in (1.98 m)	Sr	Rabun Gap Nacoochee	Novi Sad, Serbia
F	42	Mia Heide	6 ft 3 in (1.91 m)	Fr	Austin	Austin, TX

Head coach

- Lisa Stockton (Wake Forest)

Assistant coach(es)

- Alan Frey (New Orleans)
- Doshia Woods (Western Illinois)
- Beth Dunkenberger (Randolph–Macon)

Legend

- (C) Team captain
- (S) Suspended
- (I) Ineligible
- (W) Walk-on
- Injured
- Current redshirt

Roster

== Schedule and results ==
Date time, TV	Rank^{#}	Opponent^{#}	Result	Record	Site (attendance) city, state
Exhibition
10/30/2018*; 7:00 pm		Loyola (New Orleans)	W 89–49		Devlin Fieldhouse (872); New Orleans, LA
Non-conference regular season
11/08/2018*; 7:00 pm		Texas Southern	W 62–56	1–0	Devlin Fieldhouse (820); New Orleans, LA
11/15/2018*; 6:00 pm		at LSU	W 56–54	2–0	Maravich Center (1,511); Baton Rouge, LA
11/18/2018*; 4:00 pm		Washington	W 63–51	3–0	Devlin Fieldhouse (872); New Orleans, LA
11/23/2018*; 6:00 pm		vs. No. 18 California; USD Thanksgiving Tournament	L 57–65	3–1	Jenny Craig Pavilion (421); San Diego, CA
11/24/2018*; 4:00 pm		vs. Cleveland State; USD Thanksgiving Tournament	W 81–72	4–1	Jenny Craig Pavilion (362); San Diego, CA
11/28/2018*; 7:00 pm		Florida Atlantic	W 88–45	5–1	Devlin Fieldhouse (580); New Orleans, LA
12/01/2018*; 1:00 pm, CST		Southern Miss	W 71–54	6–1	Devlin Fieldhouse; New Orleans, LA
12/04/2018*; 7:00 pm		Nicholls	W 71–46	7–1	Devlin Fieldhouse (809); New Orleans, LA
12/08/2018*; 2:00 pm		at Alabama	L 58–69	7–2	Coleman Coliseum (1,943); Tuscaloosa, AL
12/21/2018*; 1:00 pm		Old Dominion; Tulane Classic semifinals	L 48–56	7–3	Devlin Fieldhouse (768); New Orleans, LA
12/22/2018*; 12:00 pm		Texas State; Tulane Classic 3rd place game	W 67–61 ^{OT}	8–3	Devlin Fieldhouse (751); New Orleans, LA
12/29/2018*; 1:00 pm		vs. Central Michigan; Miami Holiday Classic	W 68–57	9–3	Watsco Center (217); Coral Gables, FL
12/30/2018*; 2:00 pm		vs. Florida A&M; Miami Holiday Classic	W 78–34	10–3	Watsco Center (169); Coral Gables, FL
AAC regular season
01/05/2019; 2:00 pm		East Carolina	W 68–57	11–3 (1–0)	Devlin Fieldhouse (745); New Orleans, LA
01/08/2019; 6:00 pm		at Temple	W 66–57	12–3 (2–0)	McGonigle Hall (891); Philadelphia, PA
01/12/2019; 12:00 pm		at SMU	W 61–43	13–3 (3–0)	Moody Coliseum (735); Dallas, TX
01/16/2019; 7:00 pm, SNY/ESPN3		No. 2 Connecticut	L 33–75	13–4 (3–1)	Devlin Fieldhouse (2,055); New Orleans, LA
01/19/2019; 1:00 pm, ADN/CST		at South Florida	L 46–73	13–5 (3–2)	Yuengling Center (2,616); Tampa, FL
01/26/2019; 2:00 pm		Wichita State	L 44–62	13–6 (3–3)	Devlin Fieldhouse (1,019); New Orleans, LA
01/30/2019; 6:00 pm		at Memphis	W 62–61 ^{OT}	14–6 (4–3)	Elma Roane Fieldhouse (497); Memphis, TN
02/02/2019; 4:00 pm, ADN/CST		at East Carolina	L 61–63	14–7 (4–4)	Williams Arena; Greenville, NC
02/06/2019; 7:00 pm, ESPN3		South Florida	L 45–50	14–8 (4–5)	Devlin Fieldhouse (854); New Orleans, LA
02/10/2019; 2:00 pm		at Tulsa	L 67–72	14–9 (4–6)	Reynolds Center (1,203); Tulsa, OK
02/13/2019; 7:00 pm		UCF	W 61–59	15–9 (5–6)	Devlin Fieldhouse; New Orleans, LA
02/16/2019; 2:00 pm, ADN		Memphis	L 59–65	15–10 (5–7)	Devlin Fieldhouse (670); New Orleans, LA
02/20/2019; 7:00 pm, ESPN3		at Houston	L 82–83 ^{OT}	15–11 (5–8)	Fertitta Center; Houston, TX
02/24/2019; 2:00 pm, CST		SMU	L 60–64	15–12 (5–9)	Devlin Fieldhouse (647); New Orleans, LA
03/02/2019; 1:00 pm, ESPN3		at UCF	L 42–52	15–13 (5–10)	CFE Arena (2,947); Orlando, FL
03/04/2019; 1:00 pm, ESPN3		Cincinnati	L 65–80	15–14 (5–11)	Devlin Fieldhouse (538); New Orleans, LA
AAC Women's Tournament
03/08/2019; 11:00 am, ESPN3	(12)	vs. (5) South Florida; First Round	L 52–61	15–15	Mohegan Sun Arena; Uncasville, CT
*Non-conference game. ^{#}Rankings from AP Poll. (#) Tournament seedings in parentheses. All times are in Central Time.

== Rankings ==
Regular season polls
Poll	Pre- Season	Week 2	Week 3	Week 4	Week 5	Week 6	Week 7	Week 8	Week 9	Week 10	Week 11	Week 12	Week 13	Week 14	Week 15	Week 16	Week 17	Week 18	Week 19	Final
AP																				
Coaches			RV	RV					RV	RV	RV									

Legend
	Increase in ranking
	Decrease in ranking
	Not ranked previous week
(RV)	Received Votes

== See also ==
- 2018–19 Tulane Green Wave men's basketball team
