= 2018–19 East Carolina Pirates women's basketball team =

Intercollegiate basketball season

2018–19 East Carolina Pirates women's basketball
- Conference: American Athletic Conference
- Record: 16–15 (6–10 The American)
- Head coach: Chad Killinger (1st season) Nicole Mealing (1st season)
- Assistant coaches: Eboni Fields; Celeste Stewart
- Home arena: Williams Arena

2018–19 American Athletic Conference women's basketball standings
| | Conf. | | | | Overall |
| Team | W | | L | PCT | W | | L | PCT |
|---|---|---|---|---|---|---|---|---|
| No. 2 UConn † | 16 | – | 0 | 1.000 | 35 | – | 3 | .921 |
| UCF | 13 | – | 3 | .813 | 26 | – | 7 | .788 |
| Cincinnati | 12 | – | 4 | .750 | 24 | – | 11 | .686 |
| Houston | 9 | – | 7 | .563 | 15 | – | 16 | .484 |
| South Florida | 7 | – | 9 | .438 | 19 | – | 16 | .543 |
| Temple | 7 | – | 9 | .438 | 11 | – | 18 | .379 |
| East Carolina | 6 | – | 10 | .375 | 16 | – | 15 | .516 |
| Tulsa | 6 | – | 10 | .375 | 13 | – | 18 | .419 |
| Tulane | 5 | – | 11 | .313 | 15 | – | 16 | .484 |
| Wichita State | 5 | – | 11 | .313 | 12 | – | 18 | .400 |
| SMU | 5 | – | 11 | .313 | 11 | – | 19 | .367 |
| Memphis | 5 | – | 11 | .313 | 11 | – | 20 | .355 |
† 2019 AAC tournament winner As of March 17, 2019; Rankings from AP poll

The 2018–19 East Carolina Pirates women's basketball team represented East Carolina University during the 2018–19 NCAA Division I women's basketball season. The Pirates, led by first year head coach Chad Killinger and later first year head coach Nicole Mealing, played their home games at Williams Arena at Minges Coliseum and were fifth year members of the American Athletic Conference. They finished the season 16–15, 6–10 AAC play to finish in a tie for seventh place. They defeated SMU in the first round before losing in the quarterfinals of the American Athletic women's tournament to Connecticut.

Assistant coach Killinger was initially named interim head coach of the Pirates for the season, but health concerns led to his resignation 11 games into the season on December 26, 2018, and Killinger's top assistant Mealing was named interim coach for the rest of the season.

== Media ==
All Pirates home games will have a video stream on Pirates All Access, ESPN3, or AAC Digital. Road games will typically be streamed on the opponents website, though conference road games could also appear on ESPN3 or AAC Digital. Audio broadcasts for most road games can also be found on the opponents website.

== Roster ==
2018–19 East Carolina Pirates women's basketball team
Players
Coaches

| Pos. | # | Name | Height | Year | Previous school | Hometown |
|---|---|---|---|---|---|---|
| G | 0 | Justice Gee | 5 ft 7 in (1.7 m) | Jr | Timmonsville | Timmonsville, SC |
| G | 1 | Alex Frazier | 5 ft 9 in (1.75 m) | Sr | Central Gwinnett | Lawrenceville, GA |
| G | 2 | LaShonda Monk | 5 ft 6 in (1.68 m) | Fr | Southwest Guilford | Greensboro, NC |
| G | 4 | Necole Hope | 5 ft 10 in (1.78 m) | So | North Point | Waldorf, MD |
| G | 11 | Raven Johnson | 6 ft 0 in (1.83 m) | Jr | Parkview | Lilburn, GA |
| G | 13 | Kaylee Jefferson | 6 ft 0 in (1.83 m) | Fr | Sulphur Springs | Sulphur Springs, TX |
| G | 14 | Ariyana Williams | 5 ft 9 in (1.75 m) | So | Freedom | Morganton, NC |
| F | 20 | Desiree Corbin | 6 ft 2 in (1.88 m) | Sr | South Georgia Tech | Griffin, GA |
| F | 21 | Salita Greene | 5 ft 11 in (1.8 m) | Sr | Jordan; Richmond | Durham, NC |
| F | 22 | Tamia Hicks | 6 ft 1 in (1.85 m) | So | South Raleigh | Knightdale, NC |
| G/F | 23 | Dominique Claytor | 5 ft 11 in (1.8 m) | Jr | Winston-Salem Prep | Winston-Salem, NC |
| F | 33 | Tiara Chambers | 6 ft 3 in (1.91 m) | Fr | I. C. Norcom | Portsmouth, VA |
| F | 35 | Nique Cherry | 6 ft 0 in (1.83 m) | Jr | Heidelberg; Jones County JC | Laurel, MS |
| F | 44 | Destiny Campbell | 6 ft 1 in (1.85 m) | Sr | Scotland; Cape Fear CC | Laurinburg, NC |

Head coach

- Chad Killinger (Franklin (IN))

Assistant coach(es)

- Nicole Mealing (Francis Marion)
- Celeste Stewart (East Carolina)
- Eboni Fields (Francis Marion)

Legend

- (C) Team captain
- (S) Suspended
- (I) Ineligible
- (W) Walk-on
- Injured
- Current redshirt

Roster

== Schedule and results ==
| Date time, TV | Rank^{#} | Opponent^{#} | Result | Record | Site (attendance) city, state |
Non-conference regular season
| 11/06/2018*; 5:30 pm | | Maryland Eastern Shore | W 84–69 | 1–0 | Williams Arena (752); Greenville, NC |
| 11/09/2018*; 5:30 pm | | Monmouth | W 73–67 | 2–0 | Williams Arena (816); Greenville, NC |
| 11/14/2018*; 7:00 pm | | Grand Canyon | W 59–47 | 3–0 | Williams Arena (847); Greenville, NC |
| 11/18/2018*; 5:00 pm | | Kennesaw State | W 68–56 | 4–0 | Williams Arena (802); Greenville, NC |
| 11/24/2018*; 2:00 pm | | Wake Forest | W 70–61 | 5–0 | Williams Arena (901); Greenville, NC |
| 11/27/2018*; 7:00 pm | | at William & Mary | L 43–63 | 5–1 | Kaplan Arena (574); Williamsburg, VA |
| 12/01/2018*; 4:00 pm | | at Charlotte | L 46–52 | 5–2 | Dale F. Halton Arena (1,160); Charlotte, NC |
| 12/13/2018*; 11:30 am | | Liberty | W 66–63 | 6–2 | Williams Arena (6,276); Greenville, NC |
| 12/16/2018*; 2:00 pm | | USC Upstate | W 63–53 | 7–2 | Williams Arena (813); Greenville, NC |
| 12/19/2018*; 6:30 pm | | vs. Longwood; Beach Ball Classic | W 61–52 | 8–2 | Myrtle Beach Convention Center; Myrtle Beach, SC |
| 12/21/2018*; 6:30 pm | | vs. South Carolina State; Beach Ball Classic | W 71–63 | 9–2 | Myrtle Beach Convention Center; Myrtle Beach, SC |
| 12/28/2018*; 7:00 pm | | at Duke | L 66–83 | 9–3 | Cameron Indoor Stadium (3,512); Durham, NC |
| 12/30/2018*; 2:00 pm | | UNC Wilmington | L 68–71 | 9–4 | Williams Arena (982); Greenville, NC |
AAC regular season
| 01/05/2019; 3:00 pm | | at Tulane | L 57–68 | 9–5 (0–1) | Devlin Fieldhouse (745); New Orleans, LA |
| 01/09/2019; 7:00 pm | | Wichita State | W 78–56 | 10–5 (1–1) | Williams Arena (802); Greenville, NC |
| 01/12/2019; 1:00 pm | | Tulsa | L 55–75 | 10–6 (1–2) | Williams Arena (893); Greenville, NC |
| 01/19/2019; 12:00 pm | | at Memphis | L 46–58 | 10–7 (1–3) | Elma Roane Fieldhouse (471); Memphis, TN |
| 01/23/2019; 7:00 pm, ADN | | UCF | L 58–61 | 10–8 (1–4) | Williams Arena (798); Greenville, NC |
| 01/26/2019; 2:00 pm, ESPN3 | | at Temple | L 62–84 | 10–9 (1–5) | McGonigle Hall (863); Philadelphia, PA |
| 01/29/2019; 7:30 pm | | at Wichita State | L 47–57 | 10–10 (1–6) | Charles Koch Arena (1,267); Wichita, KS |
| 02/02/2019; 5:00 pm, ADN | | Tulane | W 63–61 | 11–10 (2–6) | Williams Arena; Greenville, NC |
| 02/06/2019; 7:00 pm, SNY/ESPN3 | | at No. 5 Connecticut | L 55–118 | 11–11 (2–7) | XL Center (8,469); Hartford, CT |
| 02/09/2019; 1:00 pm, ADN | | Memphis | W 68–59 | 12–11 (3–7) | Williams Arena (1,396); Greenville, NC |
| 02/14/2019; 8:00 pm | | at SMU | W 64–54 | 13–11 (4–7) | Moody Coliseum (576); Dallas, TX |
| 02/16/2019; 1:00 pm | | at Houston | L 52–63 | 13–12 (4–8) | Fertitta Center; Houston, TX |
| 02/20/2019; 7:00 pm | | South Florida | L 50–63 | 13–13 (4–9) | Williams Arena (762); Greenville, NC |
| 02/23/2019; 5:00 pm, ESPN3 | | Cincinnati | L 57–68 | 13–14 (4–10) | Williams Arena (1,102); Greenville, NC |
| 03/02/2019; 3:00 pm | | at Tulsa | W 64–60 | 14–14 (5–10) | Reynolds Center (1,119); Tulsa, OK |
| 03/04/2019; 7:00 pm | | SMU | W 67–61 | 15–14 (6–10) | Williams Arena; Greenville, NC |
AAC Women's Tournament
| 03/08/2019; 2:00 pm, ESPN3 | (8) | vs. (9) SMU; First Round | W 50–48 ^{OT} | 16–14 | Mohegan Sun Arena (3,959); Uncasville, CT |
| 03/09/2019; 2:00 pm, ESPN3 | (8) | vs. (1) No. 2 Connecticut; Quarterfinals | L 65–92 | 16–15 | Mohegan Sun Arena (5,935); Uncasville, CT |
*Non-conference game. ^{#}Rankings from AP Poll. (#) Tournament seedings in parentheses. All times are in Eastern Time.

== Rankings ==
2018–19 NCAA Division I women's basketball rankings

Regular season polls
| Poll | Pre- Season | Week 2 | Week 3 | Week 4 | Week 5 | Week 6 | Week 7 | Week 8 | Week 9 | Week 10 | Week 11 | Week 12 | Week 13 | Week 14 | Week 15 | Week 16 | Week 17 | Week 18 | Week 19 | Final |
|---|---|---|---|---|---|---|---|---|---|---|---|---|---|---|---|---|---|---|---|---|
| AP | | | | | | | | | | | | | | | | | | | | N/A |
| Coaches | | | | | | | | | | | | | | | | | | | | |

Legend
| | Increase in ranking |
| | Decrease in ranking |
| | Not ranked previous week |
| (RV) | Received Votes |

== See also ==
- 2018–19 East Carolina Pirates men's basketball team
