= 2018–19 Cincinnati Bearcats women's basketball team =

Intercollegiate basketball season

2018–19 Cincinnati Bearcats women's basketball

WNIT, Quarterfinals
- Conference: American Athletic Conference
- Record: 24–11 (12–4 The American)
- Head coach: Michelle Clark-Heard (1st season)
- Assistant coaches: Melissa Kolbe; Semeka Randall-Lay; Heath Alexander
- Home arena: Fifth Third Arena

2018–19 American Athletic Conference women's basketball standings
	Conf.				Overall
Team	W		L	PCT	W		L	PCT
No. 2 UConn †	16	–	0	1.000	35	–	3	.921
UCF	13	–	3	.813	26	–	7	.788
Cincinnati	12	–	4	.750	24	–	11	.686
Houston	9	–	7	.563	15	–	16	.484
South Florida	7	–	9	.438	19	–	16	.543
Temple	7	–	9	.438	11	–	18	.379
East Carolina	6	–	10	.375	16	–	15	.516
Tulsa	6	–	10	.375	13	–	18	.419
Tulane	5	–	11	.313	15	–	16	.484
Wichita State	5	–	11	.313	12	–	18	.400
SMU	5	–	11	.313	11	–	19	.367
Memphis	5	–	11	.313	11	–	20	.355
† 2019 AAC tournament winner As of March 17, 2019; Rankings from AP poll

The 2018–19 Cincinnati Bearcats women's basketball team represented the University of Cincinnati during the 2018–19 NCAA Division I women's basketball season. The season marked the sixth for the Bearcats as members of the American Athletic Conference. The Bearcats, led by first year head coach Michelle Clark-Heard, returned to play their home games at Fifth Third Arena after a one year for renovation. They finished the season 24–11, 12–4 in AAC play to finish in third place. They advanced to the semifinals of the American Athletic women's tournament, where they lost to UCF. They received an automatic bid Women's National Invitation Tournament, where they defeated Youngstown State, Minnesota, Butler in the first, second and third rounds before losing to TCU in the quarterfinals.

== Media ==
All games will have a video stream on Bearcats TV, ESPN3, or AAC Digital Network

== Offseason ==
=== Departing players ===
Name	Number	Pos.	Height	Year	Hometown	Notes
Ana Owens	3	G	5'6"	Senior	Indianapolis, Indiana	Graduated
Genesis Parker	5	G	5'8"	Sophomore	Bristow, Virginia	Transferred to Butler
Shanice Johnson	21	F	6'1"	Senior	Philadelphia, Pennsylvania	Graduated

=== 2018 Recruits ===
The Bearcats did not sign any high school recruits for the 2018-19 season.

=== Incoming transfers ===
Name	Num.	Pos.	Height	Year	Hometown	Previous school
Addaya Moore	14	G	5'10"	Sophomore	Granite City, Illinois	Illinois
Monique Thompson	22	G	5'8"	Graduate Student	Long Beach, California	Northwest Christian
Florence Sifa	30	G	5'7"	Junior	Bujumbura, Burundi	Jacksonville College

== Roster ==
2018–19 Cincinnati Bearcats women's basketball team
Players
Coaches

Pos.	#	Name	Height	Year	Previous school	Hometown
G	2	Nikira Goings	5 ft 8 in (1.73 m)	Sr	Osborne	Marietta, GA
F	4	Angel Rizor	6 ft 0 in (1.83 m)	Jr	East Wake	Zebulon, NC
G	10	Michaela Porter	5 ft 9 in (1.75 m)	So	Obama Academy of International Studies	Pittsburgh, PA
G	11	Sam Rodgers	5 ft 10 in (1.78 m)	Jr	Lakota East	Cincinnati, OH
G	12	Antoinette Miller	5 ft 6 in (1.68 m)	Jr	Southfield-Lathrup	Detroit, MI
G	13	Brianna Livingston	5 ft 9 in (1.75 m)	So	Wilfrid Laurier	Scarborough, ON
G	14	Addaya Moore (redshirt)	5 ft 10 in (1.78 m)	So	Illinois	Granite City, IL
F	20	Maya Benham	5 ft 10 in (1.78 m)	Sr	Osborne	Doulgasville, GA
G	22	Monique Thompson	5 ft 8 in (1.73 m)	GS	Northwest Christian	Long Beach, CA
F	23	Iimar’i Thomas	5 ft 11 in (1.8 m)	So	Sacred Heart Cathedral Prep	Oakland, CA
F	25	Chelsea Warren	5 ft 9 in (1.75 m)	Sr	Red Oak	Red Oak, TX
G	30	Florence Sifa	5 ft 7 in (1.7 m)	Jr	Jacksonville College	Bujumbura, Burundi
C	35	I'Liyah Green	6 ft 2 in (1.88 m)	RS So	Male	Louisville, KY
C	40	Andeija Puckett	6 ft 2 in (1.88 m)	So	Griffin	Griffin, GA

Head coach

- Michelle Clark-Heard (Western Kentucky)

Assistant coach(es)

- Melissa Kolbe (Wittenberg)
- Semeka Randall-Lay (Tennessee)
- Heath Alexander (Oregon)

Legend

- (C) Team captain
- (S) Suspended
- (I) Ineligible
- (W) Walk-on
- Injured
- Current redshirt

Roster

== Schedule and results ==
Date time, TV	Rank^{#}	Opponent^{#}	Result	Record	Site (attendance) city, state
Exhibition
11/03/2018*; 2:00 pm, Bearcats TV		California (PA)	W 69–49		Fifth Third Arena (583); Cincinnati, OH
Non-conference regular season
11/06/2018*; 7:00 pm, Bearcats TV		Austin Peay	W 69–48	1–0	Fifth Third Arena (873); Cincinnati, OH
11/09/2018*; 7:00 pm, Bearcats TV		East Tennessee State	W 77–64	2–0	Fifth Third Arena (840); Cincinnati, OH
11/12/2018*; 7:00 pm, Bearcats TV		Old Dominion	L 72–76 ^{OT}	2–1	Fifth Third Arena (882); Cincinnati, OH
11/16/2018*; 7:00 pm, ACCN Extra		at Pittsburgh	L 48–65	2–2	Peterson Events Center (735); Pittsburgh, PA
11/18/2018*; 3:00 pm		at Saint Louis	W 51–50	3–2	Chaifetz Arena (517); St. Louis, MO
11/21/2018*; 7:00 pm, Bearcats TV		Yale	W 66–52	4–2	Fifth Third Arena (809); Cincinnati, OH
11/24/2018*; 2:00 pm, Bearcats TV		Lipscomb	W 71–55	5–2	Fifth Third Arena (833); Cincinnati, OH
11/28/2018*; 7:00 pm		at Ball State	L 63–75	5–3	Worthen Arena (1,110); Muncie, IN
12/02/2018*; 2:00 pm		at Ohio State	L 56–69	5–4	Value City Arena (4,825); Columbus, OH
12/05/2018*; 7:00 pm		at Miami (OH)	L 65–78	5–5	Millett Hall (571); Oxford, OH
12/07/2018*; 7:00 pm, Bearcats TV		VCU	W 66–54	6–5	Fifth Third Arena (747); Cincinnati, OH
12/16/2018*; 2:00 pm, Bearcats TV		Xavier; Crosstown Shootout	W 79–61	7–5	Fifth Third Arena (3,053); Cincinnati, OH
12/21/2018*; 7:00 pm, Bearcats TV		Howard	W 85–51	8–5	Fifth Third Arena (803); Cincinnati, OH
AAC regular season
01/06/2019; 12:00 pm, ESPN2		SMU	W 69–57	9–5 (1–0)	Fifth Third Arena (1,124); Cincinnati, OH
01/09/2019; 7:00 pm, SNY/ESPN3		at No. 3 Connecticut	L 38–82	9–6 (1–1)	Harry A. Gampel Pavilion (7,591); Storrs, CT
01/13/2019; 12:00 pm, ESPNU		at UCF	L 55–56	9–7 (1–2)	CFE Arena (2,631); Orlando, FL
01/16/2019; 7:00 pm, ESPN3		Temple	W 72–52	10–7 (2–2)	Fifth Third Arena (1,004); Cincinnati, OH
01/19/2019; 3:00 pm		at Tulsa	W 70–50	11–7 (3–2)	Reynolds Center (842); Tulsa, OK
01/23/2019; 7:00 pm, ESPN3		Houston	W 68–57	12–7 (4–2)	Fifth Third Arena (814); Cincinnati, OH
01/26/2019; 2:00 pm, Bearcats TV		Memphis	W 80–56	13–7 (5–2)	Fifth Third Arena (999); Cincinnati, OH
01/30/2019; 7:00 pm, ADN		at South Florida	W 57–56	14–7 (6–2)	Yuengling Center (2,472); Tampa, FL
02/02/2019; 12:00 pm, SNY/ESPN3		No. 2 Connecticut	L 55–65	14–8 (6–3)	Fifth Third Arena (2,996); Cincinnati, OH
02/10/2019; 2:00 pm, ESPNU		Wichita State	W 82–54	15–8 (7–3)	Fifth Third Arena (1,127); Cincinnati, OH
02/13/2019; 6:30 pm, ADN		at Memphis	W 89–69	16–8 (8–3)	Elma Roane Fieldhouse (419); Memphis, TN
02/17/2019; 2:00 pm, ESPNU		at Temple	L 70–78	16–9 (8–4)	McGonigle Hall (912); Philadelphia, PA
02/20/2019; 7:00 pm, Bearcats TV		Tulsa	W 74–47	17–9 (9–4)	Fifth Third Arena (781); Cincinnati, OH
02/23/2019; 5:00 pm, ESPN3		at East Carolina	W 68–57	18–9 (10–4)	Williams Arena (1,102); Greenville, NC
03/02/2019; 12:00 pm, Bearcats TV		South Florida	W 57–43	19–9 (11–4)	Fifth Third Arena (1,945); Cincinnati, OH
03/04/2019; 2:00 pm, ESPN3		at Tulane	W 80–65	20–9 (12–4)	Devlin Fieldhouse (538); New Orleans, LA
AAC Women's Tournament
03/09/2019; 8:00 pm, ESPN3	(3)	vs. (11) Memphis; Quarterfinals	W 68–48	21–9	Mohegan Sun Arena (3,243); Uncasville, CT
03/10/2019; 6:30 pm, ESPN2	(3)	vs. (2) UCF; Semifinals	L 58–66	21–10	Mohegan Sun Arena (5,872); Uncasville, CT
WNIT
03/21/2019*; 7:00 pm, Bearcats TV		Youngstown State; First Round	W 76–62	22–10	Fifth Third Arena (1,951); Cincinnati, OH
03/24/2019*; 3:00 pm, Bearcats TV		Minnesota; Second Round	W 72–65	23–10	Fifth Third Arena (1,945); Cincinnati, OH
03/28/2019*; 7:00 pm, Bearcats TV		Butler; Third Round	W 72–65	24–10	Fifth Third Arena (2,450); Cincinnati, OH
03/31/2019*; 2:00 pm		at TCU; Quarterfinals	L 55–69	24–11	Schollmaier Arena (2,436); Fort Worth, TX
*Non-conference game. ^{#}Rankings from AP Poll. (#) Tournament seedings in parentheses. All times are in EST.

== Awards and milestones ==
=== American Athletic Conference honors ===
==== All-AAC Awards ====
- Newcomer of the Year: Florence Sifa

==== All-AAC First Team ====
- IImar’I Thomas

==== All-AAC Second Team ====
- Antoinette Miller

== See also ==
- 2018–19 Cincinnati Bearcats men's basketball team
