= 2018–19 Temple Owls women's basketball team =

Intercollegiate basketball season

2018–19 Temple Owls women's basketball
- Conference: American Athletic Conference
- Record: 11–19 (7–9 The American)
- Head coach: Tonya Cardoza (11th season)
- Assistant coaches: Way Veney; Willnett Crockett; Crayton Jones
- Home arena: Liacouras Center; McGonigle Hall

2018–19 American Athletic Conference women's basketball standings
	Conf.				Overall
Team	W		L	PCT	W		L	PCT
No. 2 UConn †	16	–	0	1.000	35	–	3	.921
UCF	13	–	3	.813	26	–	7	.788
Cincinnati	12	–	4	.750	24	–	11	.686
Houston	9	–	7	.563	15	–	16	.484
South Florida	7	–	9	.438	19	–	16	.543
Temple	7	–	9	.438	11	–	18	.379
East Carolina	6	–	10	.375	16	–	15	.516
Tulsa	6	–	10	.375	13	–	18	.419
Tulane	5	–	11	.313	15	–	16	.484
Wichita State	5	–	11	.313	12	–	18	.400
SMU	5	–	11	.313	11	–	19	.367
Memphis	5	–	11	.313	11	–	20	.355
† 2019 AAC tournament winner As of March 17, 2019; Rankings from AP poll

The 2018–19 Temple Owls women's basketball team represented Temple University during the 2018–19 NCAA Division I women's basketball season. The season marked the sixth for the Owls as members of the American Athletic Conference. The Owls, led by eleventh year head coach Tonya Cardoza, played their home games at McGonigle Hall and the Liacouras Center. They finished the season 11–19, 7–9 in AAC play to finish a tie for fifth place. They lost in the first of the American Athletic Conference women's tournament to Memphis.

== Media ==
All Owls home games have video streaming on Owls TV, ESPN3, or AAC Digital. Road games are typically streamed on the opponent's website, though conference road games may also appear on ESPN3 or AAC Digital. There are no radio broadcasts for Owls women's basketball games.

== Roster ==
2018–19 Temple Owls women's basketball team
Players
Coaches

Pos.	#	Name	Height	Year	Previous school	Hometown
G	0	Alliya Butts	5 ft 4 in (1.63 m)	RS Sr	Holy Cross	Edgewater Park, NJ
F	1	Lena Niang	6 ft 2 in (1.88 m)	Sr	Rivedale Baptist; NC State	Bowie, MD
F	2	Breanna Perry	6 ft 1 in (1.85 m)	So	Flushing	Mt. Morris, MI
G	3	Desiree Oliver	5 ft 7 in (1.7 m)	So	Penn Hills	Pittsburgh, PA
G	5	Marissa Mackins	5 ft 8 in (1.73 m)	Fr	Carolina Prep Academy	Durham, NC
G	10	Nicolette Mayo	5 ft 8 in (1.73 m)	So	Hephzibah	Hephzibah, GA
C	11	Shannen Atkinson	6 ft 4 in (1.93 m)	Jr	Smithfield	Smithfield, VA
G	12	Emani Mayo	5 ft 8 in (1.73 m)	So	Hephzibah	Hephzibah, GA
F	20	Alexa Williamson	6 ft 1 in (1.85 m)	Fr	Chartiers-Houston	Houston, PA
C	23	Destiny Samuel	6 ft 2 in (1.88 m)	Fr	Baldwin	Baldwin, NY
F	24	Shantay Taylor	6 ft 3 in (1.91 m)	Jr	Spring Valley	Columbia, SC
F	25	Mia Davis	6 ft 0 in (1.83 m)	So	St. Frances Academy	Baltimore, MD
G		Ashley Jones (redshirt)	5 ft 7 in (1.7 m)	So	Neumann-Goretti; West Virginia	Philadelphia, PA

Head coach

- Tonya Cardoza (Virginia)

Assistant coach(es)

- Way Veney (College of Charleston)
- Willnett Crockett (Connecticut)
- C. J. Jones (Francis Marion)

Legend

- (C) Team captain
- (S) Suspended
- (I) Ineligible
- (W) Walk-on
- Injured
- Current redshirt

Roster

== Schedule and results ==
Date time, TV	Rank^{#}	Opponent^{#}	Result	Record	Site (attendance) city, state
Exhibition
10/30/2018*; 7:00 pm		University of the Sciences	W 76–64		McGonigle Hall; Philadelphia, PA
Regular season
11/06/2018*; 5:30 pm		Delaware State	W 75–61	1–0	McGonigle Hall; Philadelphia, PA
11/09/2018*; 5:00 pm, ESPN+		at Saint Joseph's	W 58–52	2–0	Hagan Arena; Philadelphia, PA
11/14/2018*; 7:00 pm		at Ole Miss	L 55–62	2–1	The Pavilion at Ole Miss (1,269); Oxford, MS
11/18/2018*; 2:00 pm, ESPN+		at Marist	L 68–74	2–2	McCann Arena (1,526); Poughkeepsie, NY
11/23/2018*; 1:00 pm		vs. Radford; Miami Thanksgiving Tournament	L 50–56	2–3	Watsco Center (569); Coral Gables, FL
11/25/2018*; 2:00 pm, ACCN Extra		at Miami (FL); Miami Thanksgiving Tournament	L 61–73	2–4	Watsco Center (718); Coral Gables, FL
12/03/2018*; 12:00 pm		at No. 20 DePaul	L 88–102	2–5	McGrath-Phillips Arena (3,057); Chicago, IL
12/06/2018*; 7:00 pm		Iona	W 59–39	3–5	McGonigle Hall (923); Philadelphia, PA
12/09/2018*; 1:00 pm		at Villanova	L 68–76	3–6	Finneran Pavilion (761); Villanova, PA
12/21/2018*; 7:00 pm, SECN		at No. 25 South Carolina	L 60–88	3–7	Colonial Life Arena (11,297); Columbia, SC
12/30/2018*; 2:00 pm		La Salle	W 75–47	4–7	McGonigle Hall (801); Philadelphia, PA
01/02/2019*; 7:00 pm, ESPN+		at Duquesne	L 53–54	4–8	Palumbo Center (901); Pittsburgh, PA
01/05/2019; 3:00 pm, CBSSN		South Florida	L 53–63	4–9 (0–1)	McGonigle Hall (940); Philadelphia, PA
01/08/2019; 7:00 pm		Tulane	L 57–66	4–10 (0–2)	McGonigle Hall (891); Philadelphia, PA
01/12/2019; 2:00 pm		at Houston	L 65–78	4–11 (0–3)	Fertitta Center (866); Houston, TX
01/16/2019; 7:00 pm, ESPN3		at Cincinnati	L 52–72	4–12 (0–4)	Fifth Third Arena (1,004); Cincinnati, OH
01/20/2019; 1:00 pm, SNY/ESPN3		No. 2 Connecticut	L 67–88	4–13 (0–5)	Liacouras Center (4,692); Philadelphia, PA
01/23/2019*; 7:00 pm		at Penn	L 62–71	4–14	Palestra (437); Philadelphia, PA
01/26/2019; 2:00 pm, ESPN3		East Carolina	W 84–62	5–14 (1–5)	McGonigle Hall (863); Philadelphia, PA
01/29/2019; 8:00 pm, ADN		at Tulsa	W 75–61	6–14 (2–5)	Reynolds Center (815); Tulsa, OK
02/02/2019; 7:30 pm		at Wichita State	W 65–40	7–14 (3–5)	Charles Koch Arena (1,878); Wichita, KS
02/05/2019; 12:00 pm, ESPN3		Houston	W 76–65	8–14 (4–5)	Liacouras Center (3,287); Philadelphia, PA
02/09/2019; 1:00 pm, SNY/ESPN3		at No. 5 Connecticut	L 74–109	8–15 (4–6)	Harry A. Gampel Pavilion (10,167); Storrs, CT
02/17/2019; 2:00 pm, ESPNU		Cincinnati	W 78–70	9–15 (5–6)	McGonigle Hall (912); Philadelphia, PA
02/20/2019; 8:00 pm, ADN		at SMU	L 52–53	9–16 (5–7)	Moody Coliseum (667); Dallas, TX
02/23/2019; 2:00 pm		at UCF	L 54–62	9–17 (5–8)	CFE Arena (2,808); Orlando, FL
02/27/2019; 7:00 pm		Tulsa	L 61–64	9–18 (5–9)	McGonigle Hall (859); Philadelphia, PA
03/02/2019; 2:00 pm, ESPN3		Wichita State	W 58–42	10–18 (6–9)	McGonigle Hall (1,144); Philadelphia, PA
03/04/2019; 8:00 pm		at Memphis	W 84–53	11–18 (7–9)	Elma Roane Fieldhouse (665); Memphis, TN
AAC Women's Tournament
03/08/2019; 8:00 pm, ESPN3	(6)	vs. (11) Memphis; First Round	L 58–59	11–19	Mohegan Sun Arena (3,217); Uncasville, CT
*Non-conference game. ^{#}Rankings from AP Poll. (#) Tournament seedings in parentheses. All times are in Eastern Time.

== Rankings ==
Regular season polls
Poll	Pre- season	Week 2	Week 3	Week 4	Week 5	Week 6	Week 7	Week 8	Week 9	Week 10	Week 11	Week 12	Week 13	Week 14	Week 15	Week 16	Week 17	Week 18	Week 19	Final
AP																				N/A
Coaches																				

Legend
	Increase in ranking
	Decrease in ranking
	Not ranked previous week
(RV)	Received votes

== See also ==
- 2018–19 Temple Owls men's basketball team
