= 2018–19 UConn Huskies women's basketball team =

Intercollegiate basketball season

2018–19 UConn Huskies women's basketball

Paradise Jam Reef Division champions AAC regular season champions AAC Tournament champions

NCAA tournament, Final Four
- Conference: American Athletic Conference

Ranking
- Coaches: No. 3
- AP: No. 2
- Record: 35–3 (16–0 The American)
- Head coach: Geno Auriemma (34th season)
- Associate head coach: Chris Dailey (34th season)
- Assistant coaches: Shea Ralph (11th season); Jasmine Lister (1st season)
- Home arena: Harry A. Gampel Pavilion; XL Center

2018–19 American Athletic Conference women's basketball standings
	Conf.				Overall
Team	W		L	PCT	W		L	PCT
No. 2 UConn †	16	–	0	1.000	35	–	3	.921
UCF	13	–	3	.813	26	–	7	.788
Cincinnati	12	–	4	.750	24	–	11	.686
Houston	9	–	7	.563	15	–	16	.484
South Florida	7	–	9	.438	19	–	16	.543
Temple	7	–	9	.438	11	–	18	.379
East Carolina	6	–	10	.375	16	–	15	.516
Tulsa	6	–	10	.375	13	–	18	.419
Tulane	5	–	11	.313	15	–	16	.484
Wichita State	5	–	11	.313	12	–	18	.400
SMU	5	–	11	.313	11	–	19	.367
Memphis	5	–	11	.313	11	–	20	.355
† 2019 AAC tournament winner As of March 17, 2019; Rankings from AP poll

The 2018–19 UConn Huskies women's basketball team represented the University of Connecticut (UConn) during the 2018–19 NCAA Division I women's basketball season. The Huskies, led by Hall of Fame head coach Geno Auriemma in his 34th season at UConn, played their home games at Harry A. Gampel Pavilion and the XL Center and were sixth year members of the American Athletic Conference. They finished the season 35–3, 16–0 in AAC play to win the AAC regular season championship. They defeated East Carolina, South Florida, and UCF to win the AAC women's tournament title. As a result, they received the conference's automatic bid to the NCAA women's tournament. As the No. 2 seed, they defeated Towson and Buffalo to advance to the Sweet Sixteen. They defeated UCLA in the Sweet Sixteen and Louisville in the Elite Eight to reach their 20th Final Four. In the National Semifinal, they lost in the rematch of last year's national semifinal game to Notre Dame.

== Media ==
Every Connecticut women's game was televised. Excluding exhibitions, most Connecticut games aired on SNY, an ESPN network, or a CBS network. Exhibition games and games that aired on SNY were also streamed on Husky Vision. Every game was broadcast on the UConn IMG Sports Network with an extra audio broadcast available online to listen to through Husky Vision.

== Off-season ==
=== Departures ===
Name	Number	Pos.	Height	Year	Hometown	Notes
Andra Espinoza-Hunter	2	G	5'11"	Freshman	Ossining, NY	Transferred to Mississippi State
Kia Nurse	11	G	6'0"	Senior	Hamilton, ON	Graduated / 2018 WNBA draft
Gabby Williams	15	F	5'11"	Senior	Reno, NV	Graduated / 2018 WNBA draft
Azurá Stevens	23	G/F	6'6"	RS Junior	Raleigh, NC	Declared for 2018 WNBA draft

=== Recruits ===
College recruiting
Name	Hometown	School	Height	Weight	Commit date
Christyn Williams; G	Little Rock, AR	Central Arkansas Christian School	5 ft 11 in (1.80 m)	N/A	
Christyn Williams; G	Recruit ratings: ESPN: (98)				
Olivia Nelson-Ododa; F	Winder, GA	Winder-Barrow	6 ft 4 in (1.93 m)	N/A	
Olivia Nelson-Ododa; F	Recruit ratings: ESPN: (98)				
Overall recruit ranking:
Note: In many cases, Scout, Rivals, 247Sports, On3, and ESPN may conflict in their listings of height and weight.; In these cases, the average was taken. ESPN grades are on a 100-point scale.; Sources: "2018 Player Commits". ESPN. Archived from the original on June 22, 2017.

== Roster ==
2018–19 Connecticut Huskies women's basketball team
Players
Coaches

Pos.	#	Name	Height	Year	Previous school	Hometown
G/F	3	Megan Walker	6 ft 1 in (1.85 m)	So	Monacan	Chesterfield, VA
G	4	Mikayla Coombs	5 ft 8 in (1.73 m)	So	Wesleyan	Buford, GA
G	5	Crystal Dangerfield	5 ft 5 in (1.65 m)	Jr	Blackman	Murfreesboro, TN
G	10	Molly Bent	5 ft 9 in (1.75 m)	Jr	Tabor Academy	Centerville, MA
G	13	Christyn Williams	5 ft 11 in (1.8 m)	Fr	Central Arkansas Christian	Little Rock, AR
F	20	Olivia Nelson-Ododa	6 ft 4 in (1.93 m)	Fr	Winder-Barrow	Winder, GA
F	24	Napheesa Collier	6 ft 1 in (1.85 m)	Sr	Incarnate Word Academy	O'Fallon, MO
F	25	Kyla Irwin	6 ft 2 in (1.88 m)	Jr	State College	State College, PA
F	32	Batouly Camara	6 ft 2 in (1.88 m)	RS Jr	Kentucky	New York, NY
G/F	33	Katie Lou Samuelson	6 ft 3 in (1.91 m)	Sr	Mater Dei	Huntington Beach, CA
G/F	34	Alexis Gordon	6 ft 0 in (1.83 m)	So	L. D. Bell	Fort Worth, TX

Head coach

- Geno Auriemma (West Chester)

Assistant coach(es)

- Chris Dailey (Rutgers)
- Shea Ralph (Connecticut)
- Jasmine Lister (Vanderbilt)

Legend

- (C) Team captain
- (S) Suspended
- (I) Ineligible
- (W) Walk-on
- Injured
- Current redshirt

Roster

- Alexis Gordon was only on the roster for the fall semester, after which she transferred from UConn.

== Schedule ==
Date time, TV	Rank^{#}	Opponent^{#}	Result	Record	High points	High rebounds	High assists	Site (attendance) city, state
Exhibition
11/04/2018*; 1:00 pm, HuskyVision	No. 2	Vanguard	W 96–30		26 – 2 tied	12 – Walker	8 – Dangerfield	Harry A. Gampel Pavilion (8,209); Storrs, CT
11/15/2018*; 7:00 pm, HuskyVision	No. 2	Southern Connecticut State	W 99–45		26 – Samuelson	11 – Nelson-Ododa	9 – Collier	XL Center (6,337); Hartford, CT
Regular season
11/11/2018*; 12:00 pm, CBSSN	No. 2	Ohio State	W 85–53	1–0	19 – Samuelson	7 – Samuelson	5 – Samuelson	Harry A. Gampel Pavilion (8,828); Storrs, CT
11/17/2018*; 6:00 pm, SNY	No. 2	vs. Vanderbilt; Hall of Fame Holiday Showcase	W 80–42	2–0	19 – Dangerfield	16 – Collier	7 – Dangerfield	Mohegan Sun Arena (7,375); Uncasville, CT
11/22/2018*; 7:30 pm, FloHoops	No. 2	vs. Ole Miss; Paradise Jam tournament Reef Division	W 90–50	3–0	22 – Samuelson	10 – Collier	5 – Samuelson	Sports and Fitness Center (2,162); Saint Thomas, USVI
11/23/2018*; 7:30 pm, FloHoops	No. 2	vs. St. John's; Paradise Jam Tournament Reef Division	W 65–55	4–0	19 – Samuelson	9 – Collier	6 – Collier	Sports and Fitness Center (2,373); Saint Thomas, USVI
11/24/2018*; 7:30 pm, FloHoops	No. 2	vs. Purdue; Paradise Jam Tournament Reef Division	W 86–40	5–0	22 – Samuelson	10 – Collier	8 – Dangerfield	Sports and Fitness Center (2,703); Saint Thomas, USVI
11/28/2018*; 7:00 pm, SNY	No. 2	No. 16 DePaul	W 99–63	6–0	24 – Collier	10 – Collier	7 – Tied	XL Center (7,186); Hartford, CT
12/02/2018*; 4:00 pm, ESPN	No. 2	at No. 1 Notre Dame; Jimmy V Classic/Rivalry	W 89–71	7–0	28 – Williams	15 – Collier	6 – Samuelson	Edmund P. Joyce Center (9,149); South Bend, IN
12/04/2018*; 7:00 pm, CBSSN	No. 1	at Saint Louis	W 98–42	8–0	22 – Collier	11 – Collier	10 – Dangerfield	Chaifetz Arena (7,105); St. Louis, MO
12/08/2018*; 1:00 pm, SNY	No. 1	Seton Hall	W 99–61	9–0	26 – Samuelson	16 – Samuelson	6 – Samuelson	XL Center (9,536); Hartford, CT
12/19/2018*; 8:30 pm, FS1	No. 1	at Oklahoma	W 72–63	10–0	23 – Collier	17 – Collier	4 – Collier	Lloyd Noble Center (5,808); Norman, OK
12/22/2018*; 3:00 pm, P12N	No. 1	at No. 14 California	W 76–66	11–0	20 – Samuelson	11 – Samuelson	4 – Tied	Haas Pavilion (10,818); Berkeley, CA
01/03/2019*; 9:00 pm, ESPN	No. 1	at No. 8 Baylor	L 57–68	11–1	16 – Collier	11 – Collier	4 – Collier	Ferrell Center (10,284); Waco, TX
01/06/2019; 12:00 pm, CBSSN	No. 1	at Houston	W 81–61	12–1 (1–0)	19 – Samuelson	9 – Tied	6 – Dangerfield	Fertitta Center (3,644); Houston, TX
01/09/2019; 7:00 pm, SNY	No. 3	Cincinnati	W 82–38	13–1 (2–0)	23 – Samuelson	10 – Samuelson	10 – Dangerfield	Harry A. Gampel Pavilion (7,591); Storrs, CT
01/13/2019; 1:00 pm, ESPN	No. 3	South Florida	W 63–46	14–1 (3–0)	19 – Samuelson	7 – Collier	5 – Samuelson	Harry A. Gampel Pavilion (9,534); Storrs, CT
01/16/2019; 8:00 pm, SNY	No. 2	at Tulane	W 75–33	15–1 (4–0)	34 – Walker	10 – Tied	5 – Dangerfield	Devlin Fieldhouse (2,055); New Orleans, LA
01/19/2019; 12:00 pm, SNY	No. 2	at Temple	W 88–67	16–1 (5–0)	30 – Collier	12 – Collier	9 – Dangerfield	Liacouras Center (4,692); Philadelphia, PA
01/23/2019; 7:00 pm, SNY	No. 3	SMU	W 79–39	17–1 (6–0)	22 – Collier	8 – Collier	8 – Dangerfield	Harry A. Gampel Pavilion (9,402); Storrs, CT
01/27/2019; 4:00 pm, ESPN2	No. 3	UCF	W 93–57	18–1 (7–0)	23 – Collier	11 – Walker	9 – Dangerfield	XL Center (12,139); Hartford, CT
01/31/2019*; 7:00 pm, ESPN	No. 2	at No. 3 Louisville	L 69–78	18–2	20 – Collier	12 – Walker	6 – Collier	KFC Yum! Center (17,023); Louisville, KY
02/02/2019; 12:00 pm, SNY	No. 2	at Cincinnati	W 65–55	19–2 (8–0)	20 – Collier	11 – Collier	5 – Dangerfield	Fifth Third Arena (2,996); Cincinnati, OH
02/06/2019; 7:00 pm, SNY	No. 5	East Carolina	W 118–55	20–2 (9–0)	31 – Samuelson	8 – Samuelson	12 – Dangerfield	XL Center (8,469); Hartford, CT
02/09/2019; 1:00 pm, SNY	No. 5	Temple	W 109–74	21–2 (10–0)	30 – Collier	14 – Collier	9 – Dangerfield	Harry A. Gampel Pavilion (10,167); Storrs, CT
02/11/2019*; 7:00 pm, ESPN2	No. 4	No. 11 South Carolina	W 97–79	22–2	31 – Collier	16 – Collier	6 – Collier	XL Center (11,740); Hartford, CT
02/17/2019; 2:00 pm, SNY	No. 4	at UCF	W 78–41	23–2 (11–0)	18 – Collier	11 – Collier	7 – Dangerfield	CFE Arena (5,844); Orlando, FL
02/20/2019; 7:00 pm, SNY	No. 3	Memphis	W 102–45	24–2 (12–0)	32 – Samuelson	12 – Collier	8 – Dangerfield	XL Center (8,869); Hartford, CT
02/24/2019; 3:00 pm, SNY	No. 3	at Tulsa	W 68–49	25–2 (13–0)	21 – Walker	15 – Collier	6 – Samuelson	Reynolds Center (2,612); Tulsa, OK
02/26/2019; 7:30 pm, SNY	No. 2	at Wichita State	W 84–47	26–2 (14–0)	32 – Collier	12 – Collier	8 – Dangerfield	Charles Koch Arena (6,156); Wichita, KS
03/02/2018; 1:00 pm, SNY	No. 2	Houston	W 83–61	27–2 (15–0)	29 – Collier	9 – Tied	8 – Dangerfield	Harry A. Gampel Pavilion (10,167); Storrs, CT
03/04/2019; 7:00 pm, ESPN2	No. 2	at South Florida	W 57–47	28–2 (16–0)	17 – Dangerfield	7 – Walker	9 – Dangerfield	Yuengling Center (5,614); Tampa, FL
AAC Women's tournament
03/09/2019; 2:00 pm, ESPN3	(1) No. 2	vs. (8) East Carolina; Quarterfinals	W 92–65	29–2	37 – Collier	17 – Nelson-Ododa	6 – Tied	Mohegan Sun Arena (5,935); Uncasville, CT
03/10/2019; 4:00 pm, ESPN2	(1) No. 2	vs. (5) South Florida; Semifinals	W 81–45	30–2	24 – Walker	12 – Collier	4 – Dangerfield	Mohegan Sun Arena (5,872); Uncasville, CT
03/11/2019; 7:00 pm, ESPN2	(1) No. 2	vs. (2) UCF; Championship Game	W 66–45	31–2	25 – Collier	14 – Collier	6 – Dangerfield	Mohegan Sun Arena (6,001); Uncasville, CT
NCAA Women's tournament
03/22/2019*; 7:00 pm, ESPN2	(2 A) No. 2	(15 A) Towson; First Round	W 110–61	32–2	23 – Collier	14 – Collier	6 – Samuelson	Harry A. Gampel Pavilion (4,159); Storrs, CT
03/24/2019*; 7:00 pm, ESPN	(2 A) No. 2	(10 A) Buffalo; Second Round	W 84–72	33–2	27 – Collier	16 – Collier	8 – Collier	Harry A. Gampel Pavilion (6,390); Storrs, CT
03/29/2019*; 7:00 pm, ESPN	(2 A) No. 2	vs. (6 A) No. 20 UCLA; Sweet Sixteen	W 69–61	34–2	25 – Collier	11 – Walker	4 – Tied	Times Union Center (8,765); Albany, NY
03/31/2019*; 12:00 pm, ESPN	(2 A) No. 2	vs. (1 A) No. 5 Louisville; Elite Eight	W 80–73	35–2	29 – Samuelson	13 – Collier	6 – Collier	Times Union Center (9,204); Albany, NY
04/05/2019*; 9:30 pm, ESPN2	(2 A) No. 2	vs. (1 C) No. 3 Notre Dame; Final Four/Rivalry	L 76–81	35–3	20 – Samuelson	13 – Collier	9 – Dangerfield	Amalie Arena (20,062); Tampa, FL
*Non-conference game. ^{#}Rankings from AP poll. (#) Tournament seedings in parentheses. A=Albany Region. All times are in EST.

== Rankings ==
Regular season polls
Poll	Pre- Season	Week 2	Week 3	Week 4	Week 5	Week 6	Week 7	Week 8	Week 9	Week 10	Week 11	Week 12	Week 13	Week 14	Week 15	Week 16	Week 17	Week 18	Week 19	Week 20	Final
AP	2	2	2	2	1 (31)	1 (31)	1 (31)	1 (31)	1 (31)	3 (3)	2-T (1)	3 (1)	2 (2)	5	4	3	2	2	2	2	N/A
Coaches	2 (2)	^	2 (1)	2	1 (31)	1 (32)	1 (32)	1 (31)	1 (31)	3 (6)	4 (4)	2 (4)	2 (11)	5	4	2	2	2	2	2	3

Legend
	Increase in ranking
	Decrease in ranking
	Not ranked previous week
(RV)	Received Votes

^ Coaches did not release a Week 2 poll.

== Player statistics ==
Player	Games Played	Minutes	Field Goals	Three Pointers	Free Throws	Rebounds	Assists	Blocks	Steals	Points
Crystal Dangerfield	38	1327	184	82	61	125	225	2	60	511
Napheesa Collier	38	1270	323	15	131	411	134	64	56	792
Cristyn Williams	38	1217	171	47	54	122	86	8	46	443
Katie Lou Samuelson	34	1126	207	89	127	215	132	20	41	630
Megan Walker	36	1125	168	50	49	241	68	9	37	435
Olivia Nelson-Ododa	38	533	111	0	50	145	25	54	15	166
Mikayla Coombs	31	356	9	0	9	49	25	5	22	27
Kyla Irwin	30	310	19	9	1	52	22	2	9	48
Molly Bent	27	206	20	11	2	18	22	0	11	53
Batouly Camara	25	120	17	0	5	29	9	5	6	39
Alexis Gordon	4	10	0	0	1	0	0	0	1	1

== See also ==
- 2018–19 UConn Huskies men's basketball team
