= 2018–19 South Florida Bulls women's basketball team =

Intercollegiate basketball season

2018–19 South Florida Bulls women's basketball

WNIT, Second Round
- Conference: American Athletic Conference
- Record: 19–16 (7–9 The American)
- Head coach: Jose Fernandez (19th season)
- Assistant coaches: Michele Woods-Baxter; Jesyka Burks-Wiley; Danny Hughes
- Home arena: Yuengling Center

2018–19 American Athletic Conference women's basketball standings
	Conf.				Overall
Team	W		L	PCT	W		L	PCT
No. 2 UConn †	16	–	0	1.000	35	–	3	.921
UCF	13	–	3	.813	26	–	7	.788
Cincinnati	12	–	4	.750	24	–	11	.686
Houston	9	–	7	.563	15	–	16	.484
South Florida	7	–	9	.438	19	–	16	.543
Temple	7	–	9	.438	11	–	18	.379
East Carolina	6	–	10	.375	16	–	15	.516
Tulsa	6	–	10	.375	13	–	18	.419
Tulane	5	–	11	.313	15	–	16	.484
Wichita State	5	–	11	.313	12	–	18	.400
SMU	5	–	11	.313	11	–	19	.367
Memphis	5	–	11	.313	11	–	20	.355
† 2019 AAC tournament winner As of March 17, 2019; Rankings from AP poll

The 2018–19 South Florida Bulls women's basketball team represented the University of South Florida in the 2018–19 NCAA Division I women's basketball season. The Bulls, coached by Jose Fernandez in his nineteenth season, played their home games at Yuengling Center in Tampa, Florida. This was USF's sixth season as a member of the American Athletic Conference, known as The American or AAC. They finished the season 19–16, 7–9 in AAC play to finish in a tie for fifth place. They advanced to the semifinals of the American Athletic Conference women's tournament, where they lost to Connecticut. They received an at-large bid to the WNIT, where they defeated Stetson in the first round before losing to James Madison in the second round.

== Media ==
All Bulls games aired on Bullscast Radio or CBS 1010 AM. Conference home games rotated between ESPN3, AAC Digital, and Bullscast. Road games were typically streamed on the opponent's website, though some conference road games also appeared on ESPN3 or AAC Digital.

== Roster ==
2018–19 South Florida Bulls women's basketball team
Players
Coaches

Pos.	#	Name	Height	Year	Previous school	Hometown
G	0	Enna Penhadzic	5 ft 9 in (1.75 m)	RS So		Denmark
G	3	Sydni Harvey	5 ft 10 in (1.78 m)	Fr	Brentwood Academy	Nashville, TN
G	4	Elisa Pinzan	5 ft 8 in (1.73 m)	Fr		Murano, Italy
G	5	Vanessa Blagmon	5 ft 8 in (1.73 m)	So	Norcross	Stockbridge, GA
G/F	10	Laura Ferreira	5 ft 11 in (1.8 m)	RS Sr	Escola Secundária De Santo André	Lisbon, Portugal
G	11	Makaela Kestner	5 ft 11 in (1.8 m)	Fr	Liberty	Bealeton, VA
F	21	Shea Leverett	6 ft 2 in (1.88 m)	RS So	South Effingham HS	Rincon, GA
C	23	Tamara Henshaw	6 ft 1 in (1.85 m)	Jr	Flagler Palm Coast HS	Palm Coast, FL
G	24	Irida Tsafara	6 ft 0 in (1.83 m)	Fr		Athens, Greece
F	30	Janeta Rozentale	6 ft 0 in (1.83 m)	Fr		Dobeles, Latvia
C	31	Beatriz Jordao	6 ft 3 in (1.91 m)	Fr	Quinta dos Lombos	Pombal, Portugal
F	33	Kitija Laksa (injured)	6 ft 0 in (1.83 m)	Sr	Rigas Francu Licejs	Riga, Latvia
F	34	Silvia Serrat	6 ft 1 in (1.85 m)	So		Banyoles, Spain
C	54	Alyssa Rader	6 ft 2 in (1.88 m)	Jr	Horizon	Thornton, CO

Head coach

- Jose Fernandez (Miami-Dade Kendall)

Assistant coach(es)

- Michele Woods-Baxter (St. John Fisher College)
- Jesyka Burks-Wiley (Boston University)
- Danny Hughes (TCU)

Legend

- (C) Team captain
- (S) Suspended
- (I) Ineligible
- (W) Walk-on
- Injured
- Current redshirt

Roster

== Schedule ==
Date time, TV	Rank^{#}	Opponent^{#}	Result	Record	Site (attendance) city, state
Non-conference regular season
11/06/2018*; 7:00 pm	No. 22	at Ohio State	W 71–47	1–0	Value City Arena (3,472); Columbus, OH
11/09/2018*; 7:00 pm	No. 22	Albany	W 74–37	2–0	Yuengling Center (2,269); Tampa, FL
11/15/2018*; 7:00 pm	No. 21	Bethune–Cookman	W 88–39	3–0	Yuengling Center (2,112); Tampa, FL
11/18/2018*; 2:00 pm	No. 21	Oklahoma	W 87–70	4–0	Yuengling Center (2,804); Tampa, FL
11/22/2018*; 1:00 pm	No. 17	vs. Kentucky; Paradise Jam tournament Island Division	L 63–85	4–1	Sports and Fitness Center (874); Saint Thomas, USVI
11/23/2018*; 3:00 pm	No. 17	vs. North Carolina; Paradise Jam Tournament Island Division	L 69–71	4–2	Sports and Fitness Center (715); Saint Thomas, USVI
11/24/2018*; 3:00 pm	No. 17	vs. UCLA; Paradise Jam Tournament Island Division	W 60–56	5–2	Sports and Fitness Center; Saint Thomas, USVI
11/30/2018*; 6:00 pm		New Hampshire	W 79–36	6–2	USF Sun Dome (4,992); Tampa, FL
12/09/2018*; 2:00 pm		George Washington	W 63–30	7–2	Yuengling Center (2,081); Tampa, FL
12/15/2018*; 3:30 pm		Grambling State	W 67–50	8–2	Yuengling Center (5,117); Tampa, FL
12/17/2018*; 7:00 pm		Vermont	W 102–55	9–2	Yuengling Center (2,116); Tampa, FL
12/20/2018*; 6:15 pm		vs. Creighton; Florida Sunshine Classic	L 76–83	9–3	Warden Arena (481); Winter Haven, FL
12/21/2018*; 4:00 pm		vs. Virginia; Florida Sunshine Classic	L 67–74	9–4	Warden Arena (373); Winter Haven, FL
12/30/2018*; 4:00 pm, SECN		at LSU	L 49–78	9–5	Pete Maravich Assembly Center (2,270); Baton Rouge, LA
AAC regular season
01/05/2019; 3:00 pm, CBSSN		at Temple	W 63–53	10–5 (1–0)	McGonigle Hall (940); Philadelphia, PA
01/08/2019; 7:00 pm, ESPN3		UCF; War on I-4	L 49–62	10–6 (1–1)	Yuengling Center (2,902); Tampa, FL
01/13/2019; 1:00 pm, ESPN		at No. 3 Connecticut	L 46–63	10–7 (1–2)	Harry A. Gampel Pavilion (9,534); Storrs, CT
01/19/2019; 2:00 pm, ADN		Tulane	W 73–46	11–7 (2–2)	Yuengling Center (2,616); Tampa, FL
01/23/2019; 7:00 pm		Memphis	L 40–47	11–8 (2–3)	Yuengling Center (2,164); Tampa, FL
01/26/2019; 1:00 pm		at SMU	L 44–46	11–9 (2–4)	Moody Coliseum (823); Dallas, TX
01/30/2019; 7:00 pm, ADN		Cincinnati	L 56–57	11–10 (2–5)	Yuengling Center (2,472); Tampa, FL
02/03/2019; 1:00 pm, ESPN2		at UCF; War on I-4	L 63–66	11–11 (2–6)	CFE Arena (2,566); Orlando, FL
02/06/2019; 8:00 pm, ESPN3		at Tulane	W 45–40	12–11 (3–6)	Devlin Fieldhouse (854); New Orleans, LA
02/10/2019; 2:00 pm, ESPN2		Houston	L 52–54	12–12 (3–7)	Yuengling Center; Tampa, FL
02/16/2019; 2:00 pm, ESPN3		Tulsa	W 59–48	13–12 (4–7)	Yuengling Center (2,403); Tampa, FL
02/20/2019; 7:00 pm		at East Carolina	W 63–50	14–12 (5–7)	Williams Arena (762); Greenville, NC
02/23/2019; 7:00 pm		Wichita State	W 55–46	15–12 (6–7)	Yuengling Center (2,663); Tampa, FL
02/27/2019; 8:00 pm, ESPN2		at Houston	W 59–49	16–12 (7–7)	Fertitta Center (919); Houston, TX
03/02/2019; 12:00 pm		at Cincinnati	L 43–57	16–13 (7–8)	Fifth Third Arena (1,945); Cincinnati, OH
03/04/2019; 7:00 pm, ESPN2		No. 2 Connecticut	L 47–57	16–14 (7–9)	Yuengling Center (5,614); Tampa, FL
AAC Women's tournament
03/08/2019; 12:00 pm, ESPN3	(5)	vs. (12) Tulane; First Round	W 61–52	17–14	Mohegan Sun Arena; Uncasville, CT
03/09/2019; 12:00 pm, ESPN3	(5)	vs. (4) Houston; Quarterfinals	W 72–55	18–14	Mohegan Sun Arena; Uncasville, CT
03/10/2019; 4:00 pm, ESPN2	(5)	vs. (1) No. 2 Connecticut; Semifinals	L 45–81	18–15	Mohegan Sun Arena; Uncasville, CT
WNIT
03/21/2019*; 7:00 pm		Stetson; First Round	W 84–50	19–15	Yuengling Center (1,357); Tampa, FL
03/24/2019*; 6:00 pm		at James Madison; Second Round	L 54–71	19–16	JMU Convocation Center (986); Harrisburg, VA
*Non-conference game. ^{#}Rankings from AP Poll. (#) Tournament seedings in parentheses. All times are in EST.

== Rankings ==
Regular season polls
Poll	Pre- season	Week 2	Week 3	Week 4	Week 5	Week 6	Week 7	Week 8	Week 9	Week 10	Week 11	Week 12	Week 13	Week 14	Week 15	Week 16	Week 17	Week 18	Week 19	Final
AP	22	21	17	RV	RV	RV	RV													N/A
Coaches	21-T	21-T^	17	RV	RV	RV	RV													

Legend
	Increase in ranking
	Decrease in ranking
	Not ranked previous week
(RV)	Received votes

^Coaches did not release a Week 2 poll.

== See also ==
- 2018–19 South Florida Bulls men's basketball team
