= 2018–19 American Athletic Conference women's basketball season =

- League: NCAA Division I
- Sport: Basketball
- Duration: November 2018 through March 2019
- Teams: 12
- TV partner(s): ESPN, Regional Sports Networks

WNBA Draft

2018–19 NCAA Division I women's basketball season
- Regular Season Champions: Connecticut
- Season MVP: Napheesa Collier, Connecticut

American Athletic Conference women's basketball tournament

American Athletic Conference women's basketball seasons
- ← 2017–18 2019–20 →

2018–19 American Athletic Conference women's basketball standings
	Conf.				Overall
Team	W		L	PCT	W		L	PCT
No. 2 UConn †	16	–	0	1.000	35	–	3	.921
UCF	13	–	3	.813	26	–	7	.788
Cincinnati	12	–	4	.750	24	–	11	.686
Houston	9	–	7	.563	15	–	16	.484
South Florida	7	–	9	.438	19	–	16	.543
Temple	7	–	9	.438	11	–	18	.379
East Carolina	6	–	10	.375	16	–	15	.516
Tulsa	6	–	10	.375	13	–	18	.419
Tulane	5	–	11	.313	15	–	16	.484
Wichita State	5	–	11	.313	12	–	18	.400
SMU	5	–	11	.313	11	–	19	.367
Memphis	5	–	11	.313	11	–	20	.355
† 2019 AAC tournament winner As of March 17, 2019; Rankings from AP poll

The 2018–19 American Athletic Conference women's basketball season began with practices in October 2017, followed by the start of the 2018–19 NCAA Division I women's basketball season in November. Conference play started in January 2018 and will conclude in March with the 2019 American Athletic Conference women's basketball tournament at Mohegan Sun Arena in Uncasville, CT.

== Head coaches ==
=== Coaching changes ===
- Cincinnati did not renew the contract of Jamelle Elliott upon its expiration at the end of the 2017–18 season. Michelle Clark-Heard, previously head coach at Western Kentucky, was named as her replacement.

=== Coaches ===
Team	Head coach	Previous job	Years at school	Record at school	AAC record	AAC titles	NCAA Tournaments	NCAA Final Fours	NCAA Championships
Cincinnati	Michelle Clark-Heard	Western Kentucky	1	0–0	0–0	0	0	0	0
Connecticut	Geno Auriemma	Virginia (Assistant)	34	1027–135	86–0	5	30	19	11
East Carolina	Heather Macy	Francis Marion	9	134–117	26–42	0	0	0	0
Houston	Ronald Hughey	Florida State (Assistant)	5	44–79	16–52	0	0	0	0
Memphis	Melissa McFerrin	American	11	164–152	37–49	0	0	0	0
SMU	Travis Mays	Texas (Associate HC)	3	29–35	11–21	0	0	0	0
South Florida	Jose Fernandez	Barry University	18	335–243	66–20	0	6	0	0
Temple	Tonya Cardoza	Connecticut (Assistant)	11	200–128	47–36	0	4	0	0
Tulane	Lisa Stockton	Georgia Tech (Assistant)	25	493–259	34–34	0	11	0	0
Tulsa	Matilda Mossman	Norman High School	8	92–123	28–40	0	0	0	0
UCF	Katie Abrahamson-Henderson	Albany	3	43–23	21–11	0	0	0	0
Wichita State	Keitha Adams	UTEP	2	14–17	9–7	0	0	0	0

Notes:

- Year at school includes 2018–19 season.
- Overall and AAC records are from time at current school and are through the end the 2017–18 season.
- NCAA Tournament appearances are from time at current school only.
- NCAA Final Fours and Championship include time at other schools

== Preseason ==
=== AAC Women's Basketball Tip-off ===
Prior to the start of the season, the AAC head coaches voted on the finishing order of the teams, a Preseason All-Conference First Team, Preseason All-Conference Second Team, and a Preseason Player of the Year.

In the vote, all eligible head coaches selected Connecticut to win the 2018–19 season. Connecticut head coach Geno Auriemma, barred by conference rules from voting for his own team, voted for South Florida.

==== AAC preseason poll ====
2018 AAC Women's Basketball Preseason Poll
Head coaches
1. UConn – 121 (11)
2. USF – 111 (1)
3. Houston – 95
4. UCF – 92
5. Cincinnati – 74
6. Temple – 72
7. SMU – 55
8. ECU – 46
9. Tulane – 42
10. Wichita State – 35
11. Memphis – 25
12. Tulsa – 24

Note: First Place votes shown in ().

==== Preseason All-AAC Teams ====
2018 AAC Women's Basketball Preseason All-AAC Teams
Preseason All-Conference First Team	Preseason All-Conference Second Team
Napheesa Collier – UConn; Crystal Dangerfield – UConn; Katie Lou Samuelson – UConn; Jasmyne Harris – Houston; Kitija Laksa – USF	Angela Harris – Houston; Laura Ferreira – USF; Alicia Froling – SMU; Alliya Butts – Temple; Mia Davis – Temple

==== Preseason AAC Player of the Year ====
2018 AAC Women's Basketball Preseason Player of the Year
Head coaches
Katie Lou Samuelson – UConn

== Regular season ==
=== Rankings ===
Legend
Increase in ranking
Decrease in ranking
Not ranked previous week
First Place votes shown in ()

		Pre	Wk 2	Wk 3	Wk 4	Wk 5	Wk 6	Wk 7	Wk 8	Wk 9	Wk 10	Wk 11	Wk 12	Wk 13	Wk 14	Wk 15	Wk 16	Wk 17	Wk 18	Wk 19	Final
Cincinnati	AP																				
Cincinnati	C																				
Connecticut	AP	2	2	2	2	1 (31)	1 (31)	1 (31)	1 (31)	1 (31)	3 (3)	3 (1)	3 (1)	2 (2)	5	4	3	2	2	2	2
Connecticut	C	2 (2)	2	2 (1)	2	1 (31)	1 (32)	1 (32)	1 (31)	1 (31)	3 (6)	4 (4)	2 (4)	2 (11)	5	4	2	2	2	2	3
East Carolina	AP																				
East Carolina	C																				
Houston	AP																				
Houston	C																				
Memphis	AP																				
Memphis	C																				
SMU	AP																				
SMU	C																				
South Florida	AP	22	21	17	RV	RV	RV	RV													
South Florida	C	21	21	17	RV	RV	RV	RV													
Temple	AP																				
Temple	C																				
Tulane	AP																				
Tulane	C																				
Tulsa	AP																				
Tulsa	C																				
UCF	AP										RV	RV	RV	RV	RV	RV		RV	RV	RV	
UCF	C				RV	RV	RV	RV	RV	RV	RV	RV	RV	RV	RV	RV	RV	RV	RV	RV	
Wichita State	AP																				
Wichita State	C																				

Note: The Coaches Poll releases a final poll after the NCAA tournament, but the AP Poll does not release a poll at this time.

=== Conference matrix ===
This table summarizes the head-to-head results between teams in conference play. Each team will play 18 conference games, and at least 1 against each opponent.

	Cincinnati	Connecticut	East Carolina	Houston	Memphis	SMU	South Florida	Temple	Tulane	Tulsa	UCF	Wichita State
vs. Cincinnati	–	0–0	0–0	0–0	0–0	0–0	0–0	0–0	0–0	0–0	0–0	0–0
vs. Connecticut	0–0	–	0–0	0–0	0–0	0–0	0–0	0–0	0–0	0–0	0–0	0–0
vs. East Carolina	0–0	0–0	–	0–0	0–0	0–0	0–0	0–0	0–0	0–0	0–0	0–0
vs. Houston	0–0	0–0	0–0	–	0–0	0–0	0–0	0–0	0–0	0–0	0–0	0–0
vs. Memphis	0–0	0–0	0–0	0–0	–	0–0	0–0	0–0	0–0	0–0	0–0	0–0
vs. SMU	0–0	0–0	0–0	0–0	0–0	–	0–0	0–0	0–0	0–0	0–0	0–0
vs. South Florida	0–0	0–0	0–0	0–0	0–0	0–0	–	0–0	0–0	0–0	0–0	0–0
vs. Temple	0–0	0–0	0–0	0–0	0–0	0–0	0–0	–	0–0	0–0	0–0	0–0
vs. Tulane	0–0	0–0	0–0	0–0	0–0	0–0	0–0	0–0	–	0–0	0–0	0–0
vs. Tulsa	0–0	0–0	0–0	0–0	0–0	0–0	0–0	0–0	0–0	–	0–0	0–0
vs. UCF	0–0	0–0	0–0	0–0	0–0	0–0	0–0	0–0	0–0	0–0	–	0–0
vs. Wichita State	0–0	0–0	0–0	0–0	0–0	0–0	0–0	0–0	0–0	0–0	0–0	–
Total	0–0	0–0	0–0	0–0	0–0	0–0	0–0	0–0	0–0	0–0	0–0	0–0

=== Player of the week ===
Throughout the conference regular season, the American Athletic Conference offices named a Player(s) of the week and a Rookie(s) of the week.

Week	Player of the week	Rookie of the week	Reference

== Postseason ==
=== AAC tournament ===
First round Friday, March 8
8	East Carolina	50*
9	SMU	48
5	South Florida	61
12	Tulane	52
7	Tulsa	61
10	Wichita State	50
6	Temple	58
11	Memphis	59

Quarterfinals; Saturday, March 9
1	Connecticut	92
8	East Carolina	65
4	Houston	55
5	South Florida	72
2	UCF	66
7	Tulsa	54
3	Cincinnati	68
11	Memphis	48

Semifinals; Sunday, March 10
1	Connecticut	81
5	South Florida	45
2	UCF	66
3	Cincinnati	58

Championship Game; Monday, March 11
1	Connecticut	66
2	UCF	45

Note: * denotes overtime

=== NCAA tournament ===
Seed	Region	School	1st Round	2nd Round	Sweet 16	Elite Eight	Final Four	Championship
2	Albany	Connecticut	W 110–61 vs. #15 Towson – (Stoors)	W 84–72 vs. #10 Buffalo – (Stoors)	W 69–61 vs. #6 UCLA – (Albany)	W 80–73 vs. #1 Louisville – (Albany)	L 76–81 vs. #1 Notre Dame – (Tampa)	
11	Portland	UCF	L 45–60 vs. #5 Arizona State – (Coral Gables)					
		W–L (%):	1–1 (.500)	1–0 (1.000)	1–0 (1.000)	1–0 (1.000)	0–1 (.000)	0–0 (–) Total: 4–2 (.667)

=== National Invitation tournament ===
School	1st Round	2nd Round	3rd Round	Quarterfinals	Semifinals	Championship
Cincinnati	W 76–62 vs. Youngstown State – (Cincinnati)	W 72–65 vs. Minnesota – (Cincinnati)	W 72–65 vs. Butler – (Cincinnati)	L 55–69 vs. TCU – (Fort Worth)		
Houston	L 80–88 (OT) vs. Arkansas – (Fayetteville)					
South Florida	W 84–50 vs. Stetson – (Tampa)	L 54–71 vs. James Madison – (Harrisburg)				
W–L (%):	2–1 (.667)	1–1 (.500)	1–0 (1.000)	0–1 (.000)	0–0 (–)	0–0 (–) Total: 4–3 (.571)

== Honors and awards ==
=== AAC Awards ===
2018 AAC Women's Basketball Individual Awards
Award	Recipient(s)
Player of the Year	Napheesa Collier, Connecticut
Coach of the Year	Geno Auriemma, Connecticut
Defensive Player of the Year	Napheesa Collier, Connecticut
Freshman of the Year	Christyn Williams, Connecticut
Newcomer of the Year	Florence Sifa, Cincinnati
Sixth Player of the Year	Kayla Thigpen, South Florida
Most Improved Player	Krystal Freeman, Tulane

2018 AAC Women's Basketball All-Conference Teams
First Team	Second Team	Third Team	Freshman Team
Napheesa Collier, Connecticut; Crystal Dangerfield, Connecticut; Mia Davis, Temple; Katie Lou Samuelson, Connecticut; IImar’I Thomas, Cincinnati; Kay Kay Wright, UCF	Dorian Branch, Houston; Alliya Butts, Temple; Krystal Freeman, Tulane; Antoinette Miller, Cincinnati; Enna Pehadžić, South Florida	Alicia Froling, SMU; Angela Harris, Houston; Lashonda Monk, East Carolina; Crystal Polk, Tulsa; Megan Walker, Connecticut	Carla Bremaud, Wichita State; Sydni Harvey, South Florida; Dynah Jones, Tulane; Jamirah Shutes, Memphis; Kayla White, SMU; Christyn Williams, Connecticut

== WNBA draft ==
Player	Team	Round	Pick #	Position	School
Katie Lou Samuelson	Chicago Sky	1	4	G/F	Connecticut
Napheesa Collier	Minnesota Lynx	1	6	F	Connecticut
