= 2018–19 SMU Mustangs women's basketball team =

Intercollegiate basketball season

2018–19 SMU Mustangs women's basketball

LMU Thanksgiving Classic Champions
- Conference: American Athletic Conference
- Record: 11–19 (5–11 The American)
- Head coach: Travis Mays (3rd season)
- Assistant coaches: Mike Brandt; Erica White; Amie Smith Bradley
- Home arena: Moody Coliseum

2018–19 American Athletic Conference women's basketball standings
	Conf.				Overall
Team	W		L	PCT	W		L	PCT
No. 2 UConn †	16	–	0	1.000	35	–	3	.921
UCF	13	–	3	.813	26	–	7	.788
Cincinnati	12	–	4	.750	24	–	11	.686
Houston	9	–	7	.563	15	–	16	.484
South Florida	7	–	9	.438	19	–	16	.543
Temple	7	–	9	.438	11	–	18	.379
East Carolina	6	–	10	.375	16	–	15	.516
Tulsa	6	–	10	.375	13	–	18	.419
Tulane	5	–	11	.313	15	–	16	.484
Wichita State	5	–	11	.313	12	–	18	.400
SMU	5	–	11	.313	11	–	19	.367
Memphis	5	–	11	.313	11	–	20	.355
† 2019 AAC tournament winner As of March 17, 2019; Rankings from AP poll

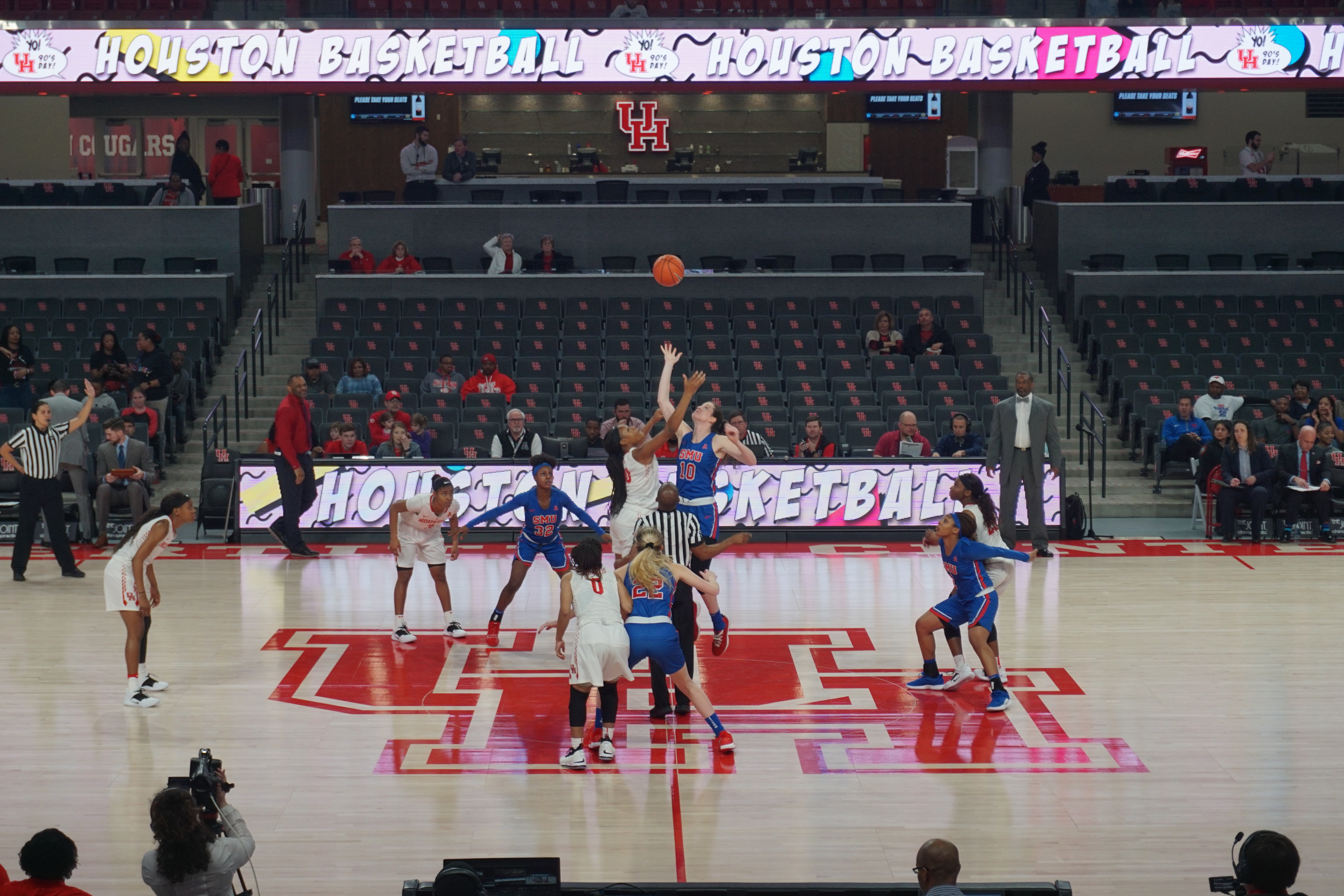
SMU in action at Houston

The 2018–19 SMU Mustangs women's basketball team represented Southern Methodist University in the 2018–19 NCAA Division I women's basketball season. The Mustangs, led by third year head coach Travis Mays, played their home games at Moody Coliseum and were sixth year members of the American Athletic Conference. They finished the season 11–19, 5–11 in AAC play to finish in a 4 way tie for ninth place. They lost in first round of the American Athletic women's tournament to East Carolina.

== Media ==
All Pony Express games will air on KAAM. Before conference season home games will be streamed on Pony Up TV. Conference home games will rotate between ESPN3, AAC Digital, and Pony Up TV. Road games will typically be streamed on the opponents website, though conference road games could also appear on ESPN3 or AAC Digital.

== Roster ==
2018–19 SMU Mustangs women's basketball team
Players
Coaches

Pos.	#	Name	Height	Year	Previous school	Hometown
F	1	Makenzie Ellis	6 ft 2 in (1.88 m)	RS Jr	Booker T. Washington; Colorado	Tulsa, OK
G	2	Ariana Whitfield	5 ft 6 in (1.68 m)	So	Cypress Ranch	Houston, TX
G	3	Savannah Ellis	5 ft 10 in (1.78 m)	So	Booker T. Washington	Tulsa, OK
G	4	Amber Bacon	5 ft 5 in (1.65 m)	Fr	South Grand Prairie	Grand Prairie, TX
F	5	Alexis Leggett	6 ft 3 in (1.91 m)	Fr	Ariton	Ariton, AL
F	10	Alicia Froling	6 ft 3 in (1.91 m)	RS Sr	Australia Institute of Sport	Queensland, Australia
G	12	Morgan Smith	5 ft 6 in (1.68 m)	So	Highland Park	Dallas, TX
G	14	Paige Bayliss	6 ft 5 in (1.96 m)	Fr	Brisbane State	Queensland, Australia
F	20	Dai'ja Thomas	6 ft 2 in (1.88 m)	Sr	Skyline	Dallas, TX
F	22	Marie Olson	6 ft 2 in (1.88 m)	Fr	Oak Ridge	El Dorado Hills, CA
F	23	BriShonne Tollie	6 ft 2 in (1.88 m)	Fr	Montverde Academy	Bartow, FL
G	24	JaQuia White	5 ft 8 in (1.73 m)	Fr	DeSoto	DeSoto, TX
G	32	Kayla White	5 ft 10 in (1.78 m)	Fr	DeSoto	DeSoto, TX
F	33	Johnasia Cash	6 ft 2 in (1.88 m)	So	McKeesport	McKeesport, PA

Head coach

- Travis Mays (Texas)

Assistant coach(es)

- Mike Brandt (Sterling (KS))
- Erica White (LSU)
- Amie Smith Bradley (Texas)

Legend

- (C) Team captain
- (S) Suspended
- (I) Ineligible
- (W) Walk-on
- Injured
- Current redshirt

Roster

== Schedule and results ==
Date time, TV	Rank^{#}	Opponent^{#}	Result	Record	Site (attendance) city, state
Exhibition
10/28/2018*; 2:00 pm		Lubbock Christian	L 52–61		Moody Coliseum; Dallas, TX
Non-conference regular season
11/09/2018*; 11:30 am		Louisiana–Monroe	W 49–38	1–0	Moody Coliseum (1,707); Dallas, TX
11/12/2018*; 7:00 pm		Mississippi Valley State	W 62–47	2–0	Moody Coliseum (504); Dallas, TX
11/15/2018*; 7:00 pm		Alabama	L 61–62 ^{OT}	2–1	Moody Coliseum (596); Dallas, TX
11/18/2018*; 2:00 pm		at TCU	L 63–65	2–2	Schollmaier Arena (1,906); Fort Worth, TX
11/20/2018*; 7:00 pm		Southeastern Louisiana	L 62–63	2–3	Moody Coliseum (566); Dallas, TX
11/23/2018*; 2:30 pm		vs. Robert Morris; LMU Thanksgiving Classic semifinals	W 60–55	3–3	Gersten Pavilion (201); Los Angeles, CA
11/24/2018*; 5:00 pm		vs. Northern Arizona; LMU Thanksgiving Classic championship	W 55–48	4–3	Gersten Pavilion (221); Los Angeles, CA
11/28/2018*; 7:00 pm		North Texas	W 73–66	5–3	Moody Coliseum (544); Dallas, TX
12/01/2018*; 3:00 pm		at Northern Colorado	L 57–58	5–4	Bank of Colorado Arena (1,145); Greeley, CO
12/15/2018*; 4:00 pm, ESPN3		at Rice	L 52–66	5–5	Tudor Fieldhouse (2,152); Houston, TX
12/19/2018*; 7:00 pm		Cal State Bakersfield	W 49–43	6–5	Moody Coliseum (795); Dallas, TX
12/22/2018*; 2:00 pm		Oklahoma	L 61–77	6–6	Moody Coliseum (1,191); Dallas, TX
12/29/2018*; 7:00 pm		UT Arlington	L 41–66	6–7	Moody Coliseum (843); Dallas, TX
AAC regular season
01/06/2019; 11:00 am, ESPN2		at Cincinnati	L 57–69	6–8 (0–1)	Fifth Third Arena (1,124); Cincinnati, OH
01/09/2019; 7:00 pm, ADN		Houston	L 61–72	6–9 (0–2)	Moody Coliseum (685); Dallas, TX
01/12/2019; 12:00 pm		Tulane	L 43–61	6–10 (0–3)	Moody Coliseum (735); Dallas, TX
01/15/2019; 7:00 pm, ADN		Wichita State	W 78–50	7–10 (1–3)	Moody Coliseum (555); Dallas, TX
01/19/2019; 1:00 pm		at UCF	L 43–55	7–11 (1–4)	CFE Arena (2,361); Orlando, FL
01/23/2019; 6:00 pm, SNY/ESPN3		at No. 3 Connecticut	L 39–79	7–12 (1–5)	Harry A. Gampel Pavilion (9,402); Storrs, CT
01/26/2019; 12:00 pm, ADN		South Florida	W 46–44	8–12 (2–5)	Moody Coliseum (823); Dallas, TX
02/02/2019; 2:00 pm		at Houston	L 68–69 ^{OT}	8–13 (2–6)	Fertitta Center (1,552); Houston, TX
02/06/2019; 7:00 pm, ADN		at Tulsa	L 35–49	8–14 (2–7)	Reynolds Center (849); Tulsa, OK
02/09/2019; 2:00 pm, ESPN3		UCF	L 54–66	8–15 (2–8)	Moody Coliseum (831); Dallas, TX
02/14/2019; 7:00 pm		East Carolina	L 54–64	8–16 (2–9)	Moody Coliseum (576); Dallas, TX
02/17/2019; 2:00 pm		at Wichita State	L 42–53	8–17 (2–10)	Charles Koch Arena (1,922); Wichita, KS
02/20/2019; 7:00 pm, ADN		Temple	W 53–52	9–17 (3–10)	Moody Coliseum (667); Dallas, TX
02/24/2019; 2:00 pm		at Tulane	W 64–60	10–17 (4–10)	Devlin Fieldhouse (647); New Orleans, LA
03/02/2019; 2:00 pm, ADN		Memphis	W 71–48	11–17 (5–10)	Moody Coliseum (793); Dallas, TX
03/04/2019; 6:00 pm		at East Carolina	L 61–67	11–18 (5–11)	Williams Arena; Greenville, NC
AAC Women's Tournament
03/08/2019; 1:00 pm, ESPN3	(9)	vs. (8) East Carolina; First Round	L 48–50 ^{OT}	11–19	Mohegan Sun Arena (3,959); Uncasville, CT
*Non-conference game. ^{#}Rankings from AP Poll. (#) Tournament seedings in parentheses. All times are in Central Time.

== See also ==
- 2018–19 SMU Mustangs men's basketball team
