= 2019 American Athletic Conference women's basketball tournament =

- Tournament Logo
- Classification: Division I
- Season: 2018–19
- Teams: 12
- Site: Mohegan Sun Arena; Uncasville, Connecticut
- Champions: Connecticut (6th title)
- Winning coach: Geno Auriemma (6th title)
- MVP: Napheesa Collier (Connecticut)
- Attendance: 28,227
- Television: ESPNU, ESPN2, ESPN3

2018–19 American Athletic Conference women's basketball standings
	Conf.				Overall
Team	W		L	PCT	W		L	PCT
No. 2 UConn †	16	–	0	1.000	35	–	3	.921
UCF	13	–	3	.813	26	–	7	.788
Cincinnati	12	–	4	.750	24	–	11	.686
Houston	9	–	7	.563	15	–	16	.484
South Florida	7	–	9	.438	19	–	16	.543
Temple	7	–	9	.438	11	–	18	.379
East Carolina	6	–	10	.375	16	–	15	.516
Tulsa	6	–	10	.375	13	–	18	.419
Tulane	5	–	11	.313	15	–	16	.484
Wichita State	5	–	11	.313	12	–	18	.400
SMU	5	–	11	.313	11	–	19	.367
Memphis	5	–	11	.313	11	–	20	.355
† 2019 AAC tournament winner As of March 17, 2019; Rankings from AP poll

The 2019 American Athletic Conference women's basketball tournament was a postseason tournament held from March 8 through 11, 2019 in the Mohegan Sun Arena in Uncasville, Connecticut. UConn was the winner of the American Athletic Tournament and earned an automatic bid to the 2019 NCAA Division I women's basketball tournament.

== Seeds ==
All teams in the American Athletic Conference qualified for the tournament. Teams were seeded based on conference record, and then a tiebreaker system was used. Teams seeded 5–12 played in the opening round, and teams seeded 1–4 received a bye to the quarterfinals.

Seed	School	Conference	Overall	Tiebreaker
1	‡# - Connecticut	16–0	28–2	
2	# - UCF	13–3	24–5	
3	# - Cincinnati	12–4	20–9	
4	# - Houston	9–7	15–14	
5	South Florida	7–9	16–14	1–0 vs. TEM
6	Temple	7–9	11–18	0–1 vs. USF
7	Tulsa	6–10	12–17	1–1 vs Temple
8	East Carolina	6–10	15–14	0–1 vs Temple
9	SMU	5–11	11–18	3–2 vs WSU/Memphis/Tulane, 1–0 vs USF
10	Wichita State	5–11	12–17	3–2 vs SMU/Memphis/Tulane, 0–1 vs USF
11	Memphis	5–11	10–19	2–3 vs SMU/WSU/Tulane, 1–0 vs USF
12	Tulane	5–11	15–14	2–3 vs SMU/WSU/Memphis, 0–2 vs USF
‡ – American Athletic Conference regular season champions. # – Received a first-round bye in the conference tournament. Overall record are as of the end of the regular season.

== Schedule ==
All tournament games are nationally televised on an ESPN network:

Session	Game	Time*	Matchup^{#}	Score	Television	Attendance
First round – Friday, March 8
1	1	12:00 PM	No. 12 Tulane vs. No. 5 South Florida	52–61	ESPN3	3,959
1	2	2:00 PM	No. 9 SMU vs. No. 8 East Carolina	48–50^{OT}	ESPN3	3,959
2	3	6:00 PM	No. 10 Wichita State vs. No. 7 Tulsa	50–61	ESPN3	3,217
2	4	8:00 PM	No. 11 Memphis vs. No. 6 Temple	59–58	ESPN3	3,217
Quarterfinals – Saturday, March 9
3	5	12:00 PM	No. 5 South Florida vs. No. 4 Houston	72–55	ESPN3	5,935
3	6	2:00 PM	No. 8 East Carolina vs. No. 1 Connecticut	65–92	ESPN3	5,935
4	7	6:00 PM	No. 7 Tulsa vs. No. 2 UCF	54–66	ESPN3	3,243
4	8	8:00 PM	No. 11 Memphis vs. No. 3 Cincinnati	48–68	ESPN3	3,243
Semifinals – Sunday, March 10
5	9	4:00 PM	No. 5 South Florida vs. No. 1 Connecticut	45–81	ESPN2	5,872
5	10	6:30 PM	No. 2 UCF vs. No. 3 Cincinnati	66–58	ESPNU	5,872
Championship – Monday, March 11
6	11	7:00 PM	No. 1 Connecticut vs. No. 2 UCF	66–45	ESPN2	6,001
*Game times in ET. #-Rankings denote tournament seeding.

== Bracket ==
First round Friday, March 8
8	East Carolina	50*
9	SMU	48
5	South Florida	61
12	Tulane	52
7	Tulsa	61
10	Wichita State	50
6	Temple	58
11	Memphis	59

Quarterfinals; Saturday, March 9
1	Connecticut	92
8	East Carolina	65
4	Houston	55
5	South Florida	72
2	UCF	66
7	Tulsa	54
3	Cincinnati	68
11	Memphis	48

Semifinals; Sunday, March 10
1	Connecticut	81
5	South Florida	45
2	UCF	66
3	Cincinnati	58

Championship Game; Monday, March 11
1	Connecticut	66
2	UCF	45

Note: * denotes overtime

== See also ==
- 2019 American Athletic Conference men's basketball tournament
