= 2018–19 Memphis Tigers women's basketball team =

Intercollegiate basketball season

2018–19 Memphis Tigers women's basketball
- Conference: American Athletic Conference
- Record: 11–20 (5–11 The American)
- Head coach: Melissa McFerrin (11th season)
- Assistant coaches: Michele Savage; Amy Stephens; Jessica Bogia
- Home arena: Elma Roane Fieldhouse

2018–19 American Athletic Conference women's basketball standings
	Conf.				Overall
Team	W		L	PCT	W		L	PCT
No. 2 UConn †	16	–	0	1.000	35	–	3	.921
UCF	13	–	3	.813	26	–	7	.788
Cincinnati	12	–	4	.750	24	–	11	.686
Houston	9	–	7	.563	15	–	16	.484
South Florida	7	–	9	.438	19	–	16	.543
Temple	7	–	9	.438	11	–	18	.379
East Carolina	6	–	10	.375	16	–	15	.516
Tulsa	6	–	10	.375	13	–	18	.419
Tulane	5	–	11	.313	15	–	16	.484
Wichita State	5	–	11	.313	12	–	18	.400
SMU	5	–	11	.313	11	–	19	.367
Memphis	5	–	11	.313	11	–	20	.355
† 2019 AAC tournament winner As of March 17, 2019; Rankings from AP poll

The 2018–19 Memphis Tigers women's basketball team represented the University of Memphis during the 2018–19 NCAA Division I women's basketball season. The season marked the sixth for the Tigers as members of the American Athletic Conference. The Tigers, led by eleventh year head coach Melissa McFerrin, played their home games at the Elma Roane Fieldhouse. They finished the season 11–20, 5–11 AAC play to finish in a 4-way tie for ninth place. They defeated Temple in the first round before losing in the quarterfinals of the American Athletic women's tournament to Cincinnati.

== Media ==
All Tigers home games will have a radio broadcast live on WUMR. Video streaming for all home games will be available on the Memphis Tiger Network, ESPN3, or AAC Digital. Road games will typically be streamed on the opponents website, though conference road games could also appear on ESPN3 or AAC Digital.

== Roster ==
2018–19 Memphis Tigers women's basketball team
Players
Coaches

Pos.	#	Name	Height	Year	Previous school	Hometown
G	0	Jada Stinson	5 ft 8 in (1.73 m)	So	Elizabethtown	Elizabethtown, KY
G	3	Gazmyne Herndon	5 ft 8 in (1.73 m)	Jr	Douglass; Walters State CC	Memphis, TN
G	4	Finess Dickson	5 ft 6 in (1.68 m)	RS Fr	Homewood Flossmoor	Homewood, IL
C	10	Camille Buckhanon	6 ft 2 in (1.88 m)	Fr	Talladega	Talladega, AL
G	11	Malainna White	5 ft 9 in (1.75 m)	Fr	Pensacola	Pensacola, FL
G	15	Taylor Barnes	5 ft 8 in (1.73 m)	Jr	Saint Benedict at Auburndale	Memphis, TN
F	20	Manaya Jones	6 ft 4 in (1.93 m)	RS So	Raleigh-Egypt; Old Dominion	Memphis, TN
F	22	Kiana Coomber	5 ft 11 in (1.8 m)	Jr	Prairie Central; Loyola–Chicago/Chipola College	Fairbury, IL
G	23	Jamirah Shutes	5 ft 6 in (1.68 m)	Fr	Haywood	Brownsville, TN
C	25	Brianna Porter	6 ft 3 in (1.91 m)	Sr	University School of Nashville	Nashville, TN
F	33	Alana Davis	6 ft 2 in (1.88 m)	So	Cross Creek	Augusta, GA
F	34	Ashia Jones	6 ft 1 in (1.85 m)	RS Sr	Covington; Tennessee–Martin	Covington, TN
F	35	Jasmine James	6 ft 1 in (1.85 m)	Sr	San Jacinto	Innisfil, ON

Head coach

- Melissa McFerrin (Missouri)

Assistant coach(es)

- Michele Savage (Northwestern)
- Amy Stephens (Nebraska)
- Jessica Bogia (Lafayette)

Legend

- (C) Team captain
- (S) Suspended
- (I) Ineligible
- (W) Walk-on
- Injured
- Current redshirt

Roster

== Schedule and results ==
Date time, TV	Rank^{#}	Opponent^{#}	Result	Record	Site (attendance) city, state
Exhibition
11/03/2018*; 2:00 pm		LeMoyne–Owen	W 91–44		Elma Roane Fieldhouse (675); Memphis, TN
Non-conference regular season
11/07/2018*; 7:00 pm		Jackson State	W 68–67	1–0	Elma Roane Fieldhouse (755); Memphis, TN
11/12/2018*; 7:00 pm		at Arkansas State	L 66–77	1–1	First National Bank Arena; Jonesboro, AR
11/15/2018*; 6:00 pm		at UAB	L 54–85	1–2	Bartow Arena (352); Birmingham, AL
11/18/2018*; 2:00 pm		Louisiana Tech	L 50–66	1–3	Elma Roane Fieldhouse (709); Memphis, TN
11/23/2018*; 3:00 pm		vs. Mercer; Coastal Carolina Thanksgiving Classic	W 59–53	2–3	HTC Center (247); Conway, SC
11/25/2018*; 1:00 pm		at Coastal Carolina; Coastal Carolina Thanksgiving Classic	L 71–90	2–4	HTC Center (287); Conway, SC
12/01/2018*; 11:00 am		Toledo	L 48–58	2–5	Elma Roane Fieldhouse (408); Memphis, TN
12/04/2018*; 5:30 pm		New Orleans	L 59–66	2–6	Elma Roane Fieldhouse (412); Memphis, TN
12/09/2018*; 2:00 pm		Samford	W 53–48	3–6	Elma Roane Fieldhouse (458); Memphis, TN
12/17/2018*; 7:00 pm		Southeast Missouri State	W 69–57	4–6	Elma Roane Fieldhouse (553); Memphis, TN
12/21/2018*; 11:00 am		Little Rock	L 60–63	4–7	Elma Roane Fieldhouse (376); Memphis, TN
12/29/2018*; 2:30 pm		North Carolina Central	W 77–56	5–7	Elma Roane Fieldhouse (454); Memphis, TN
01/01/2019*; 1:00 pm		at George Washington	L 38–51	5–8	Charles E. Smith Center (751); Washington, D.C.
AAC regular season
01/05/2019; 4:00 pm, CBSSN		UCF	L 55–68	5–9 (0–1)	Elma Roane Fieldhouse (676); Memphis, TN
01/09/2019; 7:00 pm		at Tulsa	L 39–46	5–10 (0–2)	Reynolds Center (918); Tulsa, OK
01/12/2019; 2:00 pm, ADN		at Wichita State	W 71–50	6–10 (1–2)	Charles Koch Arena (1,380); Wichita, KS
01/19/2019; 11:00 am		East Carolina	W 58–46	7–10 (2–2)	Elma Roane Fieldhouse (471); Memphis, TN
01/23/2019; 6:00 pm		at South Florida	W 47–40	8–10 (3–2)	Yuengling Center (2,164); Tampa, FL
01/26/2019; 1:00 pm		at Cincinnati	L 56–80	8–11 (3–3)	Fifth Third Arena (999); Cincinnati, OH
01/30/2019; 6:00 pm		Tulane	L 61–62 ^{OT}	8–12 (3–4)	Elma Roane Fieldhouse (497); Memphis, TN
02/02/2019; 3:00 pm		Tulsa	W 59–56	9–12 (4–4)	Elma Roane Fieldhouse (524); Memphis, TN
02/06/2019; 7:00 pm		Wichita State	L 48–57	9–13 (4–5)	Elma Roane Fieldhouse (589); Memphis, TN
02/09/2019; 12:00 pm, ADN		at East Carolina	L 59–68	9–14 (4–6)	Williams Arena (1,396); Greenville, NC
02/13/2019; 5:30 pm, ADN		Cincinnati	L 69–89	9–15 (4–7)	Elma Roane Fieldhouse (419); Memphis, TN
02/16/2019; 2:00 pm, ADN		at Tulane	W 65–59	10–15 (5–7)	Devlin Fieldhouse (670); New Orleans, LA
02/20/2019; 6:00 pm, SNY/ESPN3		at No. 3 Connecticut	L 45–102	10–16 (5–8)	XL Center (8,869); Hartford, CT
02/24/2019; 1:00 pm, ESPNU		Houston	L 57–59	10–17 (5–9)	Elma Roane Fieldhouse (657); Memphis, TN
03/02/2019; 2:00 pm		at SMU	L 48–71	10–18 (5–10)	Moody Coliseum (793); Dallas, TX
03/04/2019; 7:00 pm		Temple	L 53–84	10–19 (5–11)	Elma Roane Fieldhouse (665); Memphis, TN
AAC Women's Tournament
03/08/2019; 7:00 pm, ESPN3	(11)	vs. (6) Temple; First Round	W 59–58	11–19	Mohegan Sun Arena (3,217); Uncasville, CT
03/08/2019; 7:00 pm, ESPN3	(11)	vs. (3) Cincinnati; Quarterfinals	L 48–68	11–20	Mohegan Sun Arena (3,243); Uncasville, CT
*Non-conference game. ^{#}Rankings from AP Poll. (#) Tournament seedings in parentheses. All times are in Central Time.

== See also ==
- 2018–19 Memphis Tigers men's basketball team
