= 2018–19 Wichita State Shockers women's basketball team =

Intercollegiate basketball season

2018–19 Wichita State Shockers women's basketball
- Conference: American Athletic Conference
- Record: 12–18 (5–11 The American)
- Head coach: Keitha Adams (2nd season)
- Assistant coaches: Ewa Laskowska; Jeff Osterman; Kelli Bagley
- Home arena: Charles Koch Arena (10,506)

2018–19 American Athletic Conference women's basketball standings
	Conf.				Overall
Team	W		L	PCT	W		L	PCT
No. 2 UConn †	16	–	0	1.000	35	–	3	.921
UCF	13	–	3	.813	26	–	7	.788
Cincinnati	12	–	4	.750	24	–	11	.686
Houston	9	–	7	.563	15	–	16	.484
South Florida	7	–	9	.438	19	–	16	.543
Temple	7	–	9	.438	11	–	18	.379
East Carolina	6	–	10	.375	16	–	15	.516
Tulsa	6	–	10	.375	13	–	18	.419
Tulane	5	–	11	.313	15	–	16	.484
Wichita State	5	–	11	.313	12	–	18	.400
SMU	5	–	11	.313	11	–	19	.367
Memphis	5	–	11	.313	11	–	20	.355
† 2019 AAC tournament winner As of March 17, 2019; Rankings from AP poll

The 2018–19 Wichita State Shockers women's basketball team represented Wichita State University in the 2018–19 NCAA Division I women's basketball season. They played their home games at Charles Koch Arena, which has a capacity of 10,506. The Shockers, led by second year head coach Keitha Adams, were second year members of the American Athletic Conference. They finished the season 12–18, 5–11 in AAC play to finish in a 4 way tie for ninth place. They lost in first round of the American Athletic women's tournament to Tulsa.

== Roster ==
2018–19 Wichita State Shockers women's basketball team
Players
Coaches

Pos.	#	Name	Height	Year	Previous school	Hometown
G	0	Jada Peacock	5 ft 8 in (1.73 m)	Fr	Allen HS	Arlington, TX
G	1	Dawnyel Lair	5 ft 8 in (1.73 m)	Fr	Fairfax HS	Los Angeles, CA
F	3	Natalia Ryng	5 ft 10 in (1.78 m)	Fr	SMS Pzkosz Lomianki	Gdynia, Poland
G	5	Ashley Reid	5 ft 5 in (1.65 m)	Fr	Rider HS; New Mexico JC	Wichita Falls, TX
F	11	Sabrina Lozada-Cabbage	6 ft 2 in (1.88 m)	Sr	Santa Fe HS	Santa Fe, NM
G	12	Carla Bremaud	5 ft 11 in (1.8 m)	Fr	Life Prep Academy	Angers, France
F	13	Raven Prince	6 ft 1 in (1.85 m)	RS Jr	Millwood HS; Butler CC	Oklahoma City, OK
G	15	Jaida Hampton	5 ft 10 in (1.78 m)	Fr	East Lansing HS	Lansing, MI
G	21	Maya Brewer	5 ft 11 in (1.8 m)	Jr	North Kansas City HS; State Fair CC	Kansas City, MO
F	22	Alyssia Faye	6 ft 2 in (1.88 m)	So	Lycée Jean Mermoz	Valence, France
G	23	Seraphine Bastin	5 ft 8 in (1.73 m)	Fr	Sainte-Marie Namur	Dinant, Belgium
F/C	24	Trajata Colbert	6 ft 2 in (1.88 m)	Fr	Wilcox County HS	Rochelle, GA
G	30	Cesaria Ambrosio	6 ft 0 in (1.83 m)	Sr	Redlands CC	Fully, Switzerland
F	34	Shyia Smith	5 ft 11 in (1.8 m)	Fr	Idabel HS	Idabel, GA
F/C	42	Asia Henderson	6 ft 3 in (1.91 m)	RS Fr	South View HS	Hope Mills, NC

Head coach

- Keitha Adams (Southwestern (KS))

Assistant coach(es)

- Ewa Laskowska (Kansas State)
- Jeff Osterman (Siena)
- Kelli Bagley (UTEP)

Legend

- (C) Team captain
- (S) Suspended
- (I) Ineligible
- (W) Walk-on
- Injured
- Current redshirt

Roster

== Schedule ==
Date time, TV	Rank^{#}	Opponent^{#}	Result	Record	Site (attendance) city, state
Exhibition
11/01/2018*; 6:00 pm		Missouri Southern State	W 62–49		Charles Koch Arena (1,356); Wichita, KS
Non-conference regular season
11/07/2018*; 6:30 pm, Cox Yurview		Arkansas–Pine Bluff	W 76–39	1–0	Charles Koch Arena (1,427); Wichita, KS
11/10/2018*; 2:00 pm, Cox Yurview		Missouri State	W 63–60 ^{OT}	2–0	Charles Koch Arena (1,967); Wichita, KS
11/14/2018*; 6:30 pm, Cox Yurview		Sam Houston State	W 63–55	3–0	Charles Koch Arena (1,357); Wichita, KS
11/17/2018*; 2:00 pm, Cox Yurview		Houston Baptist	W 68–50	4–0	Charles Koch Arena (1,567); Wichita, KS
11/21/2018*; 7:00 pm, ESPN+		vs. South Dakota	L 64–73	4–1	Sanford Pentagon (1,892); Sioux Falls, SD
11/24/2018*; 6:30 pm, Cox Yurview		Louisiana Tech	W 70–56	5–1	Charles Koch Arena (1,638); Wichita, KS
11/27/2018*; 6:30 pm, Cox Yurview		Oklahoma State	L 47–60	5–2	Charles Koch Arena (1,818); Wichita, KS
12/02/2018*; 2:00 pm, Cox Yurview		Tennessee Tech	L 45–55	5–3	Charles Koch Arena (1,403); Wichita, KS
12/08/2018*; 2:00 pm, Cox Yurview		Creighton	L 71–83	5–4	Charles Koch Arena (1,702); Wichita, KS
12/11/2018*; 12:00 pm, Cox Yurview		Grambling State	W 70–61	6–4	Charles Koch Arena (7,356); Wichita, KS
12/19/2018*; 7:00 pm		vs. Northwestern; Duel in the Desert Desert Division semifinals	L 43–65	6–5	Cox Pavilion (952); Paradise, NV
12/20/2018*; 4:30 pm		vs. Washington State; Duel in the Desert Desert Division 3rd place game	L 59–85	6–6	Cox Pavilion; Paradise, NV
12/30/2018*; 2:00 pm, Cox Yurview		Savannah State	W 66–50	7–6	Charles Koch Arena (1,596); Wichita, KS
AAC regular season
01/04/2019; 7:00 pm, ADN		at Tulsa	L 49–63	7–7 (0–1)	Reynolds Center (1,009); Tulsa, OK
01/09/2019; 6:00 pm		at East Carolina	L 56–78	7–8 (0–2)	Williams Arena (802); Greenville, NC
01/12/2019; 2:00 pm, ADN		Memphis	L 50–71	7–9 (0–3)	Charles Koch Arena (1,380); Wichita, KS
01/17/2019; 7:00 pm, ADN		at SMU	L 50–78	7–10 (0–4)	Moody Coliseum (555); Dallas, TX
01/20/2019; 1:00 pm, ESPNU		Houston	L 58–66	7–11 (0–5)	Charles Koch Arena (1,457); Wichita, KS
01/26/2019; 2:00 pm		at Tulane	W 62–44	8–11 (1–5)	Devlin Fieldhouse (1,019); New Orleans, LA
01/29/2019; 6:30 pm, Cox Yurview		East Carolina	W 57–47	9–11 (2–5)	Charles Koch Arena (1,267); Wichita, KS
02/02/2019; 6:30 pm, Cox Yurview		Temple	L 40–65	9–12 (2–6)	Charles Koch Arena (1,878); Wichita, KS
02/06/2019; 7:00 pm		at Memphis	W 57–48	10–12 (3–6)	Elma Roane Fieldhouse (589); Memphis, TN
02/10/2019; 1:00 pm, ESPNU		at Cincinnati	L 54–82	10–13 (3–7)	Fifth Third Arena (1,127); Cincinnati, OH
02/17/2019; 2:00 pm, Cox Yurview		SMU	W 53–42	11–13 (4–7)	Charles Koch Arena (1,922); Wichita, KS
02/20/2019; 6:30 pm, Cox Yurview		UCF	L 49–57	11–14 (4–8)	Charles Koch Arena (1,769); Wichita, KS
02/23/2019; 6:00 pm		at South Florida	L 46–55	11–15 (4–9)	Yuengling Center (2,663); Tampa, FL
02/26/2019; 6:30 pm, SNY/ESPN3		No. 2 Connecticut	L 47–84	11–16 (4–10)	Charles Koch Arena (6,156); Wichita, KS
03/02/2019; 1:00 pm, ESPN3		at Temple	L 52–68	11–17 (4–11)	McGonigle Hall (1,144); Philadelphia, PA
03/04/2019; 6:30 pm, Cox Yurview		Tulsa	W 71–49	12–17 (5–11)	Charles Koch Arena (1,552); Wichita, KS
AAC Women's Tournament
03/08/2019; 5:00 pm, ESPN3	(10)	vs. (7) Tulsa; First Round	L 50–61	12–18	Mohegan Sun Arena; Uncasville, CT
*Non-conference game. ^{#}Rankings from AP Poll. (#) Tournament seedings in parentheses. All times are in Central Time.

== See also ==
- 2018–19 Wichita State Shockers men's basketball team
