= 2018–19 Tulsa Golden Hurricane women's basketball team =

Intercollegiate basketball season

2018–2019 Tulsa Golden Hurricane women's basketball
- Conference: American Athletic Conference
- Record: 13–18 (6–10 The American)
- Head coach: Matilda Mossman (8th season)
- Assistant coaches: Shane Coffey; Tari Cummings; Leah Foster
- Home arena: Reynolds Center

2018–19 American Athletic Conference women's basketball standings
	Conf.				Overall
Team	W		L	PCT	W		L	PCT
No. 2 UConn †	16	–	0	1.000	35	–	3	.921
UCF	13	–	3	.813	26	–	7	.788
Cincinnati	12	–	4	.750	24	–	11	.686
Houston	9	–	7	.563	15	–	16	.484
South Florida	7	–	9	.438	19	–	16	.543
Temple	7	–	9	.438	11	–	18	.379
East Carolina	6	–	10	.375	16	–	15	.516
Tulsa	6	–	10	.375	13	–	18	.419
Tulane	5	–	11	.313	15	–	16	.484
Wichita State	5	–	11	.313	12	–	18	.400
SMU	5	–	11	.313	11	–	19	.367
Memphis	5	–	11	.313	11	–	20	.355
† 2019 AAC tournament winner As of March 17, 2019; Rankings from AP poll

The 2018–19 Tulsa Golden Hurricane women's basketball team represented the University of Tulsa during the 2018–19 NCAA Division I women's basketball season. The season marked the fifth season for the Golden Hurricane as members of the American Athletic Conference (AAC). The Golden Hurricane, led by eighth-year head coach Matilda Mossman, played their home games at the Reynolds Center in Tulsa, Oklahoma. They finished the season 13–18, 6–10 in AAC play, to finish in a tie for seventh place. They defeated Wichita State in the first round before losing to UCF in the quarterfinals of the AAC women's tournament.

== Media ==
All Golden Hurricane games were broadcast on KTGX CHROME 95.3 FM and KWTU 88.7 FM HD3. The audio broadcast could also be heard on Hurricane Vision. A video stream for all home games were on Hurricane Vision, ESPN3, or AAC Digital. Road games were typically streamed on the opponents' websites, though conference road games could also appear on ESPN3 or AAC Digital.

== Roster ==
2018–19 Tulsa Golden Hurricane women's basketball team
Players
Coaches

Pos.	#	Name	Height	Year	Previous school	Hometown
F	00	Kendrian Elliott	6 ft 2 in (1.88 m)	Jr	Wichita South	Wichita, KS
G	2	Tatyana Perez	5 ft 6 in (1.68 m)	Sr	Cypress Woods	Cypress, TX
G	4	Addison Richardson	6 ft 2 in (1.88 m)	Jr	Bixby	Bixby, OK
G	5	Jasmine Butler	6 ft 0 in (1.83 m)	Jr	Pearland	Pearland, TX
G	10	Alexis Gaulden	5 ft 8 in (1.73 m)	Jr	Broken Arrow	Broken Arrow, OK
G	11	Maddie Bittle	5 ft 8 in (1.73 m)	Fr	Bixby	Bixby, OK
G	12	Renetha Dickson	5 ft 9 in (1.75 m)	Jr	Lutheran North	St. Louis, MO
G	15	K. K. Rodriguez	5 ft 6 in (1.68 m)	Fr	Webster Groves	St. Louis, MO
F	20	Elín Sóley Hrafnkelsdóttir	6 ft 1 in (1.85 m)	Fr	Univ. of Iceland	Kópavogur, Iceland
G	21	Rebecca Lescay	5 ft 8 in (1.73 m)	So	Liberty	Plano, TX
G	22	Morgan Brady	5 ft 7 in (1.7 m)	So	Parkview Arts & Science	Hensley, AR
G	23	Kayla Moutry	5 ft 9 in (1.75 m)	Fr	McKinney	McKinney, TX
F	25	Tyjae' Scales	6 ft 1 in (1.85 m)	Sr	Kinkaid	Houston, TX
G	32	Desiree Lewis	5 ft 10 in (1.78 m)	Fr	Judson	Converse, TX
F	33	Crystal Polk	6 ft 2 in (1.88 m)	Jr	Lawton Ike	Lawton, OK

Head coach

- Matilda Mossman (Western Kentucky)

Assistant coach(es)

- Shane Coffey (Oklahoma State)
- Tari Cummings (Oklahoma State)
- Leah Foster (St. Edward's)

Legend

- (C) Team captain
- (S) Suspended
- (I) Ineligible
- (W) Walk-on
- Injured
- Current redshirt

Roster
Last update: June 17, 2024

== Schedule and results ==
Date time, TV	Rank^{#}	Opponent^{#}	Result	Record	Site (attendance) city, state
Exhibition
November 1, 2018*; 7:00 p.m.		USAO	W 89–38		Reynolds Center (867); Tulsa, OK
Non-conference regular season
November 6, 2018*; 12:00 p.m.		Stetson	W 55–54	1–0	Reynolds Center (987); Tulsa, OK
November 9, 2018*; 6:00 p.m.		at American	L 52–68	1–1	Bender Arena (609); Washington, D.C.
November 12, 2018*; 5:00 p.m.		at Belmont	L 53–78	1–2	Curb Event Center (619); Nashville, TN
November 17, 2018*; 2:00 p.m.		at Oral Roberts; PSO Mayor's Cup	W 76–68	2–2	Mabee Center (1,493); Tulsa, OK
November 20, 2018*; 7:00 p.m.		Saint Louis	W 86–75 ^{OT}	3–2	Reynolds Center (981); Tulsa, OK
November 24, 2018*; 2:00 p.m.		at Stephen F. Austin	L 34–76	3–3	William R. Johnson Coliseum (1,303); Nacogdoches, TX
November 28, 2018*; 7:00 p.m.		Abilene Christian	W 75–63	4–3	Reynolds Center (871); Tulsa, OK
December 1, 2018*; 4:30 p.m.		vs. Alabama; ASU Classic semifinals	W 80–73	5–3	Wells Fargo Arena (2,626); Tempe, AZ
December 2, 2018*; 3:00 p.m.		at Arizona State; ASU Classic championship	L 52–70	5–4	Wells Fargo Arena (1,881); Tempe, AZ
December 9, 2018*; 2:00 p.m.		at Arkansas State	L 60–73	5–5	First National Bank Arena (671); Jonesboro, AR
December 17, 2018*; 7:00 p.m.		Little Rock	L 53–63	5–6	Reynolds Center (863); Tulsa, OK
December 20, 2018*; 2:00 p.m.		Arkansas	L 59–61	5–7	Reynolds Center (1,222); Tulsa, OK
December 29, 2018*; 2:00 p.m.		UTEP	W 66–45	6–7	Reynolds Center (823); Tulsa, OK
AAC regular season
January 4, 2019; 7:00 p.m., ADN		Wichita State	W 63–49	7–7 (1–0)	Reynolds Center (1,009); Tulsa, OK
January 9, 2019; 7:00 p.m.		Memphis	W 46–39	8–7 (2–0)	Reynolds Center (918); Tulsa, OK
January 12, 2019; 4:00 p.m.		at East Carolina	W 75–55	9–7 (3–0)	Williams Arena (893); Greenville, NC
January 16, 2019; 6:00 p.m.		at UCF	L 44–60	9–8 (3–1)	CFE Arena (2,547); Orlando, FL
January 19, 2019; 2:00 p.m.		Cincinnati	L 50–70	9–9 (3–2)	Reynolds Center (842); Tulsa, OK
January 26, 2019; 2:00 p.m.		at Houston	L 44–76	9–10 (3–3)	Fertitta Center (1,185); Houston, TX
January 29, 2019; 7:00 p.m., ADN		Temple	L 61–75	9–11 (3–4)	Reynolds Center (815); Tulsa, OK
February 2, 2019; 3:00 p.m.		at Memphis	L 56–59	9–12 (3–5)	Elma Roane Fieldhouse (524); Memphis, TN
February 6, 2019; 7:00 p.m., ADN		SMU	W 49–35	10–12 (4–5)	Reynolds Center (849); Tulsa, OK
February 10, 2019; 2:00 p.m.		Tulane	W 72–67	11–12 (5–5)	Reynolds Center (1,203); Tulsa, OK
February 16, 2019; 1:00 p.m., ESPN3		at South Florida	L 48–59	11–13 (5–6)	Yuengling Center (2,403); Tampa, FL
February 20, 2019; 6:00 p.m.		at Cincinnati	L 47–74	11–14 (5–7)	Fifth Third Arena (781); Cincinnati, OH
February 24, 2019; 2:00 p.m., SNY/ESPN3		No. 3 Connecticut	L 49–68	11–15 (5–8)	Reynolds Center (2,612); Tulsa, OK
February 27, 2019; 6:00 p.m.		at Temple	W 64–61	12–15 (6–8)	McGonigle Hall (859); Philadelphia, PA
March 2, 2019; 2:00 p.m.		East Carolina	L 60–64	12–16 (6–9)	Reynolds Center (1,119); Tulsa, OK
March 4, 2019; 6:30 p.m.		at Wichita State	L 49–71	12–17 (6–10)	Charles Koch Arena (1,552); Wichita, KS
AAC women's tournament
March 8, 2019; 5:00 p.m., ESPN3	(7)	vs. (10) Wichita State; First round	W 61–50	13–17	Mohegan Sun Arena; Uncasville, CT
March 9, 2019; 5:00 p.m., ESPN3	(7)	vs. (2) UCF; Quarterfinals	L 54–66	13–18	Mohegan Sun Arena; Uncasville, CT
*Non-conference game. ^{#}Rankings from AP poll. (#) Tournament seedings in parentheses. All times are in Central.

== See also ==
- 2018–19 Tulsa Golden Hurricane men's basketball team
