= 2018–19 UCF Knights women's basketball team =

Intercollegiate basketball season

2018–19 UCF Knights women's basketball

NCAA tournament, first round
- Conference: American Athletic Conference
- Record: 26–7 (13–3 The American)
- Head coach: Katie Abrahamson-Henderson (3rd season)
- Assistant coaches: Tahnee Balerio; Nykesha Sales; Isoken Uzamere
- Home arena: CFE Arena

2018–19 American Athletic Conference women's basketball standings
	Conf.				Overall
Team	W		L	PCT	W		L	PCT
No. 2 UConn †	16	–	0	1.000	35	–	3	.921
UCF	13	–	3	.813	26	–	7	.788
Cincinnati	12	–	4	.750	24	–	11	.686
Houston	9	–	7	.563	15	–	16	.484
South Florida	7	–	9	.438	19	–	16	.543
Temple	7	–	9	.438	11	–	18	.379
East Carolina	6	–	10	.375	16	–	15	.516
Tulsa	6	–	10	.375	13	–	18	.419
Tulane	5	–	11	.313	15	–	16	.484
Wichita State	5	–	11	.313	12	–	18	.400
SMU	5	–	11	.313	11	–	19	.367
Memphis	5	–	11	.313	11	–	20	.355
† 2019 AAC tournament winner As of March 17, 2019; Rankings from AP poll

The 2018–19 UCF Knights women's basketball team represented the University of Central Florida during the 2018–19 NCAA Division I women's basketball season. The Knights competed in the American Athletic Conference (AAC). The Knights, in the program's 42nd season of basketball, were led by third-year head coach Katie Abrahamson-Henderson, and played their home games at the CFE Arena on the university's main campus in Orlando, Florida. They finished the season 26–7, 13–3 in AAC play, to finish in second place. They advanced to the championship game of the AAC women's tournament, where they lost to Connecticut. They received an at-large bid to the NCAA women's tournament, which was their first trip since 2011. There, they lost to Arizona State in the first round.

== Media ==
All UCF games had an audio or video broadcast available. For conference play, UCF games were typically available on ESPN3, AAC Digital, or UCF Knights All-Access. Road games not on ESPN3 or AAC Digital had an audio broadcast available on the UCF portal. All non-conference home games were streamed exclusively on UCF Knights All-Access. Select non-conference road games had a stream available through the opponent's website. The audio broadcast for home games was only available through UCF Knights All-Access.

== Roster ==
2018–19 UCF Knights women's basketball team
Players
Coaches

Pos.	#	Name	Height	Year	Previous school	Hometown
G	0	Sianni Martin	5 ft 8 in (1.73 m)	RS Jr	Neumann Goretti HS; Towson	Philadelphia, PA
G	1	Anna Kelly	5 ft 6 in (1.68 m)	RS So	Lexington HS; Fordham	Lexington, MA
G	2	Korneila Wright	5 ft 7 in (1.7 m)	Jr	Jones HS	Orlando, FL
G	3	Diamond Battles	5 ft 8 in (1.73 m)	Fr	Winter Haven HS	Winter Haven, FL
F	5	Masseny Kaba	6 ft 3 in (1.91 m)	So	Cathedral HS	Dorchester, MA
G	10	Britney Onyeje	5 ft 9 in (1.75 m)	Fr	Pflugerville HS	Pflugerville, TX
G	11	Kayla Thingpen	5 ft 8 in (1.73 m)	Sr	Palm Beach Lakes HS	West Palm Beach, FL
F	12	Nyala Shuler	6 ft 0 in (1.83 m)	RS Sr	Edgewater HS	Orlando, FL
G	21	Sydnee McDonald	5 ft 11 in (1.8 m)	Sr	Flint Carman-Ainsworth HS; Chipola College	Flint, MI
F	24	Fifi Ndour	6 ft 1 in (1.85 m)	RS Sr	Montverde Academy	Dakar, Senegal
F	25	Tolulope Omokore	5 ft 11 in (1.8 m)	RS Jr	Eleanor Roosevelt HS	Greenbelt, MD
F	32	Britney Smith	6 ft 3 in (1.91 m)	Fr	Boone HS	Orlando, FL
G	33	Jamesha Paul	5 ft 8 in (1.73 m)	Sr	Dillard HS	Pompano Beach, FL

Head coach

- Katie Abrahamson-Henderson (Iowa)

Assistant coach(es)

- Tahnee Balerio (Missouri State)
- Nykesha Sales (Connecticut)
- Isoken Uzamere (Hofstra)

Legend

- (C) Team captain
- (S) Suspended
- (I) Ineligible
- (W) Walk-on
- Injured
- Current redshirt

Roster
Last update: June 7, 2024

== Schedule and results ==
Date time, TV	Rank^{#}	Opponent^{#}	Result	Record	Site (attendance) city, state
Non-conference regular season
November 7, 2018*; 11:00 a.m.		at Pittsburgh	W 61–58	1–0	Peterson Events Center (8,357); Pittsburgh, PA
November 14, 2018*; 7:00 p.m.		at Stetson	W 78–55	2–0	Edmunds Center (482); DeLand, FL
November 18, 2018*; 2:00 p.m.		at Mercer	W 76–42	3–0	Hawkins Arena (446); Macon, GA
November 21, 2018*; 5:00 p.m.		at Central Michigan	L 68–75	3–1	McGuirk Arena (1,676); Mount Pleasant, MI
November 24, 2018*; 2:30 p.m.		Richmond; UCF Thanksgiving Tournament	W 70–48	4–1	CFE Arena (761); Orlando, FL
November 25, 2018*; 1:30 p.m.		Villanova; UCF Thanksgiving Tournament	W 71–56	5–1	CFE Arena (730); Orlando, FL
November 30, 2018*; 7:00 p.m.		Chattanooga	W 75–37	6–1	CFE Arena (2,774); Orlando, FL
December 9, 2018*; 5:00 p.m.		at Delaware	W 71–60	7–1	Bob Carpenter Center (1,043); Newark, DE
December 12, 2018*; 7:00 p.m.		at Duquesne	W 71–63	8–1	Palumbo Center (492); Pittsburgh, PA
December 17, 2018*; 7:00 p.m.		Pacific	W 64–57	9–1	CFE Arena (2,411); Orlando, FL
December 21, 2018*; 5:00 p.m.		vs. Liberty; St. Pete Shootout	W 53–45	10–1	McArthur Center (212); St. Petersburg, FL
December 22, 2018*; 7:30 p.m.		vs. No. 15 Syracuse; St. Pete Shootout	L 52–57	10–2	McArthur Center (204); St. Petersburg, FL
December 30, 2018*; 2:00 p.m.		at Quinnipiac	W 47–45	11–2	People's United Center (1,080); Hamden, CT
AAC regular season
January 5, 2019; 5:00 p.m., CBSSN		at Memphis	W 68–55	12–2 (1–0)	Elma Roane Fieldhouse (676); Memphis, TN
January 8, 2019; 7:00 p.m., ESPN3		at South Florida; War on I-4	W 62–49	13–2 (2–0)	Yuengling Center (2,902); Tampa, FL
January 13, 2019; 12:00 p.m., ESPNU		Cincinnati	W 56–55	14–2 (3–0)	CFE Arena (2,631); Orlando, FL
January 16, 2019; 7:00 p.m.		Tulsa	W 60–44	15–2 (4–0)	CFE Arena (2,547); Orlando, FL
January 19, 2019; 2:00 p.m.		SMU	W 55–43	16–2 (5–0)	CFE Arena (2,361); Orlando, FL
January 23, 2019; 7:00 p.m., ADN		at East Carolina	W 61–58 ^{OT}	17–2 (6–0)	Williams Arena (798); Greenville, NC
January 27, 2019; 4:00 p.m., ESPN2		at No. 3 Connecticut	L 57–93	17–3 (6–1)	XL Center (12,139); Hartford, CT
January 30, 2019; 7:00 p.m., ESPN3		Houston	W 58–56	18–3 (7–1)	CFE Arena (3,306); Orlando, FL
February 3, 2019; 1:00 p.m., ESPN2		South Florida; War on I-4	W 66–63	19–3 (8–1)	CFE Arena (2,566); Orlando, FL
February 9, 2019; 2:00 p.m., ESPN3		at SMU	W 66–54	20–3 (9–1)	Moody Coliseum (831); Dallas, TX
February 13, 2019; 8:00 p.m.		at Tulane	L 59–61	20–4 (9–2)	Devlin Fieldhouse; New Orleans, LA
February 17, 2019; 2:00 p.m., SNY/ESPN3		No. 4 Connecticut	L 41–78	20–5 (9–3)	CFE Arena (5,844); Orlando, FL
February 20, 2019; 7:30 p.m.		at Wichita State	W 57–49	21–5 (10–3)	Charles Koch Arena (1,769); Wichita, KS
February 23, 2019; 2:00 p.m.		Temple	W 62–54	22–5 (11–3)	CFE Arena (2,808); Orlando, FL
March 2, 2019; 2:00 p.m., ESPN3		Tulane	W 52–42	23–5 (12–3)	CFE Arena (2,947); Orlando, FL
March 4, 2019; 7:00 p.m., CBSSN		at Houston	W 59–50	24–5 (13–3)	Fertitta Center; Houston, TX
AAC women's tournament
March 9, 2019; 6:00 p.m., ESPN3	(2)	vs. (7) Tulsa; Quarterfinals	W 66–54	25–5	Mohegan Sun Arena; Uncasville, CT
March 10, 2019; 6:30 p.m., ESPN2	(2)	vs. (3) Cincinnati; Semifinals	W 66–58	26–5	Mohegan Sun Arena (5,872); Uncasville, CT
March 11, 2019; 7:00 p.m., ESPN2	(2)	vs. (3) No. 2 Connecticut; Championship game	L 45–66	26–6	Mohegan Sun Arena (6,001); Uncasville, CT
NCAA women's tournament
March 22, 2019*; 7:00 p.m., ESPN2	(12 P)	vs. (5 P) No. 22 Arizona State; First round	L 45–60	26–7	Watsco Center; Coral Gables, FL
*Non-conference game. ^{#}Rankings from AP poll. (#) Tournament seedings in parentheses. P=Portland Region. All times are in Eastern.

== Rankings ==
Regular-season polls
Poll	Pre- season	Week 2	Week 3	Week 4	Week 5	Week 6	Week 7	Week 8	Week 9	Week 10	Week 11	Week 12	Week 13	Week 14	Week 15	Week 16	Week 17	Week 18	Week 19	Final
AP										RV	RV	RV	RV	RV	RV		RV	RV	RV	N/A
Coaches				RV	RV	RV	RV	RV	RV	RV	RV	RV	RV	RV	RV	RV	RV	RV	RV	

Legend
	Increase in ranking
	Decrease in ranking
	Not ranked previous week
(RV)	Received votes

== See also ==
- 2018–19 UCF Knights men's basketball team
