= 2018–19 Houston Cougars women's basketball team =

Intercollegiate basketball season

2018–19 Houston Cougars women's basketball

WNIT, First Round
- Conference: American Athletic Conference
- Record: 15–16 (9–7 The American)
- Head coach: Ronald Hughey (5th season)
- Assistant coaches: Tai Dillard; Victoria Picott; Jamila Ganter
- Home arena: H&PE Arena; Fertitta Center

2018–19 American Athletic Conference women's basketball standings
	Conf.				Overall
Team	W		L	PCT	W		L	PCT
No. 2 UConn †	16	–	0	1.000	35	–	3	.921
UCF	13	–	3	.813	26	–	7	.788
Cincinnati	12	–	4	.750	24	–	11	.686
Houston	9	–	7	.563	15	–	16	.484
South Florida	7	–	9	.438	19	–	16	.543
Temple	7	–	9	.438	11	–	18	.379
East Carolina	6	–	10	.375	16	–	15	.516
Tulsa	6	–	10	.375	13	–	18	.419
Tulane	5	–	11	.313	15	–	16	.484
Wichita State	5	–	11	.313	12	–	18	.400
SMU	5	–	11	.313	11	–	19	.367
Memphis	5	–	11	.313	11	–	20	.355
† 2019 AAC tournament winner As of March 17, 2019; Rankings from AP poll

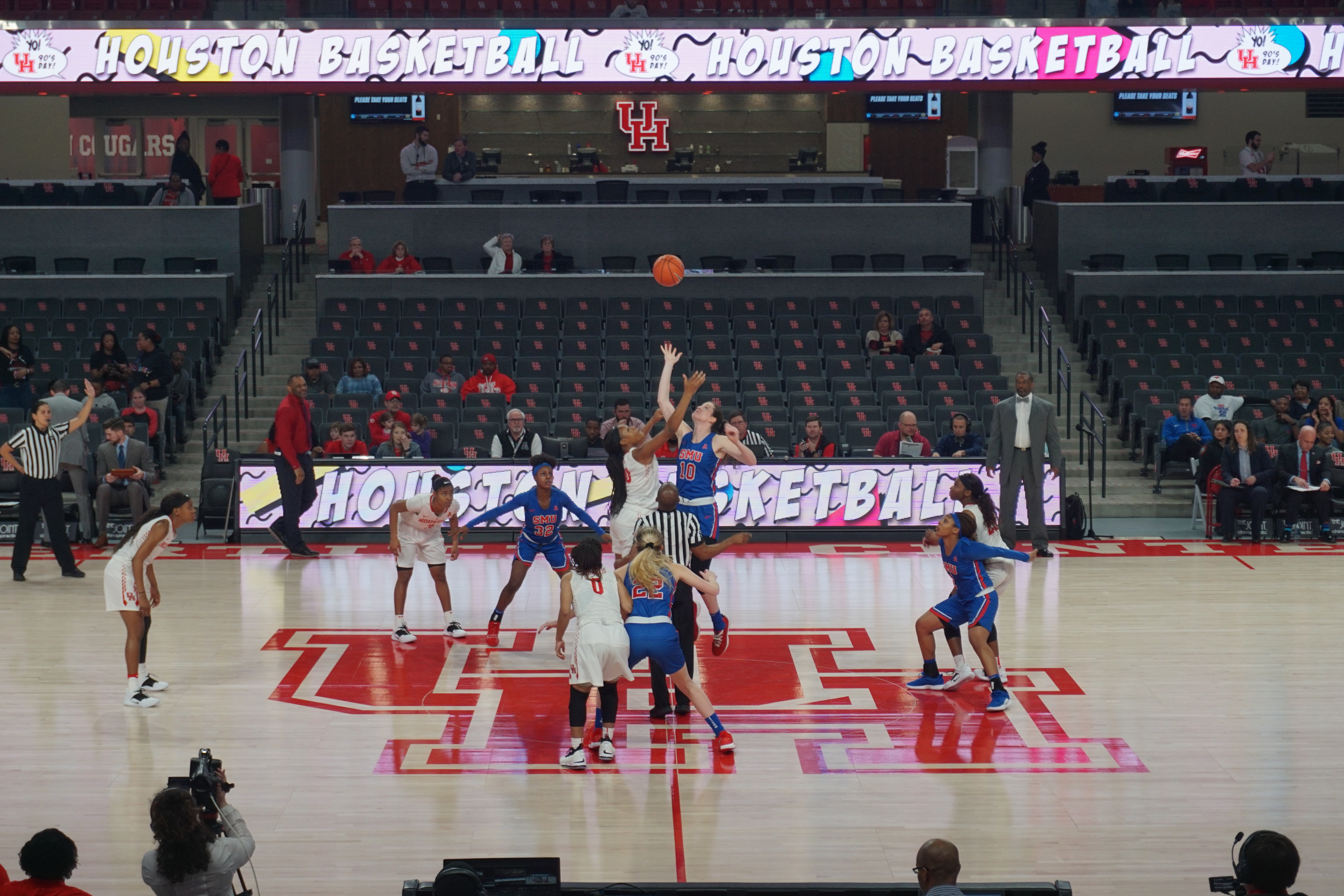
Houston in action against SMU

The 2018–19 Houston Cougars women's basketball team represented the University of Houston during the 2018–19 NCAA Division I women's basketball season. This was the Cougars' sixth season as members of the American Athletic Conference. The Cougars were led by fifth-year head coach Ronald Hughey. They played their home games at Fertitta Center, which reopened on December 1, 2018, after a $60 million upgrade. The Cougars played their first three non-conference home games at H&PE Arena while construction on Fertitta Center was completed. They finished the season 15–16, 9–7 in The American play to finish in fourth place. They lost to South Florida in the quarterfinals of the American Athletic Conference women's tournament. They received an at-large bid to the Women's National Invitation Tournament, where they lost to Arkansas in the first round.

== Media ==
All Cougars games home and away are aired on the Houston Cougars IMG Sports Network, streamed online via the Houston Portal, with Gerald Sanchez and Louis Ray on the call. Before conference season home games streamed on Houston All-Access. Conference home games rotated between ESPN3, AAC Digital, and the Houston Portal. Road games typically were streamed on the opponents' websites, though some conference road games also appeared on ESPN3 or AAC Digital.

== Roster ==
2018–19 Houston Cougars women's basketball team
Players
Coaches

Pos.	#	Name	Height	Year	Previous school	Hometown
G	0	Angela Harris	5 ft 6 in (1.68 m)	Jr	Cy-Fair HS	Cypress, TX
F	1	Starr Jacobs	6 ft 0 in (1.83 m)	Fr	Duncanville HS; USC	Duncanville, TX
F	2	Octavia Barnes	5 ft 10 in (1.78 m)	Sr	Raymond HS; Hinds CC	Jackson, MS
F	3	Dorian Branch	5 ft 10 in (1.78 m)	Jr	Richardson HS	Dallas, TX
G	4	Jasmyne Harris	5 ft 8 in (1.73 m)	Jr	Brazosport HS	Freeport, TX
G	5	Dymond Gladney	5 ft 3 in (1.6 m)	Fr	Clear Springs HS	Los Angeles, CA
F	12	Alyssa Okoene	6 ft 2 in (1.88 m)	RS So	North Shore; North Carolina	Houston, TX
G	21	Jaidah Stewart	5 ft 9 in (1.75 m)	Fr	Kirkwood HS	St. Louis, MO
F	22	Myyah West	6 ft 0 in (1.83 m)	Sr	Prentiss HS; Jones County JC	Prentiss, MS
G	23	Serithia Hawkins	5 ft 11 in (1.8 m)	Sr	Southmoore	Moore, OK
G	33	Juila Blackshell-Fair	5 ft 10 in (1.78 m)	So	Vanden	Fairfield, CA

Head coach

- Ronald Hughey (Limestone College)

Assistant coach(es)

- Tai Dillard (Texas)
- Victoria Picott (Rutgers)
- Jamila Ganter (Texas A&M)

Legend

- (C) Team captain
- (S) Suspended
- (I) Ineligible
- (W) Walk-on
- Injured
- Current redshirt

Roster

== Schedule and results ==
Date time, TV	Rank^{#}	Opponent^{#}	Result	Record	Site (attendance) city, state
Non-conference regular season
11/06/2018*; 9:00 pm		at No. 24 California	L 79–80	0–1	Haas Pavilion (1,246); Berkeley, CA
11/09/2018*; 7:00 pm		Georgia Tech	W 95–89 ^{2OT}	1–1	H&PE Arena (791); Houston, TX
11/14/2018*; 6:30 pm		at Louisiana Tech	L 88–100 ^{OT}	1–2	Thomas Assembly Center (1,128); Ruston, LA
11/16/2018*; 11:30 am		at Incarnate Word	W 79–60	2–2	McDermott Center (404); San Antonio, TX
11/18/2018*; 1:00 pm		Boston College	L 57–64	2–3	HP&E Arena; Houston, TX
11/21/2018*; 1:00 pm, ESPN+		at Columbia	W 83–72	3–3	Levien Gymnasium (348); New York, NY
11/24/2018*; 2:00 pm		New Mexico	L 84–89 ^{2OT}	3–4	HP&E Arena (802); Houston, TX
11/28/2018*; 4:00 pm		at Florida Gulf Coast	L 71–76	3–5	Alico Arena (2,021); Fort Myers, FL
12/01/2018*; 1:00 pm		at East Tennessee State	W 84–77	4–5	J. Madison Brooks Gymnasium (933); Johnson City, TN
12/06/2018*; 6:00 pm, ESPN2		Texas A&M	L 52–68	4–6	Fertitta Center (2,107); Houston, TX
12/17/2018*; 7:00 pm		Texas–Arlington	L 61–65 ^{OT}	4–7	Fertitta Center (831); Houston, TX
12/21/2018*; 3:00 pm, ESPN+		at George Mason	W 66–56	5–7	EagleBank Arena (602); Fairfax, VA
12/30/2018*; 2:00 pm		at Southern Miss	W 61–44	6–7	Reed Green Coliseum (1,093); Hattiesburg, MS
AAC regular season
01/06/2019; 11:00 am, CBSSN		No. 1 Connecticut	L 61–81	6–8 (0–1)	Fertitta Center (3,644); Houston, TX
01/09/2019; 7:00 pm, ADN		at SMU	W 72–61	7–8 (1–1)	Moody Coliseum (685); Dallas, TX
01/12/2019; 1:00 pm		Temple	W 78–65	8–8 (2–1)	Fertitta Center (866); Houston, TX
01/20/2019; 1:00 pm, ESPNU		at Wichita State	W 66–58	9–8 (3–1)	Charles Koch Arena (1,457); Wichita, KS
01/23/2019; 6:00 pm, ESPN3		at Cincinnati	L 57–68	9–9 (3–2)	Fifth Third Arena (814); Cincinnati, OH
01/26/2019; 2:00 pm		Tulsa	W 76–44	10–9 (4–2)	Fertitta Center (1,185); Houston, TX
01/30/2019; 6:00 pm, ESPN3		at UCF	L 56–58	10–10 (4–3)	CFE Arena (3,306); Orlando, FL
02/02/2019; 2:00 pm		SMU	W 69–68 ^{OT}	11–10 (5–3)	Fertitta Center (1,552); Houston, TX
02/05/2019; 11:00 am, ESPN3		at Temple	L 65–76	11–11 (5–4)	Liacouras Center (3,287); Philadelphia, PA
02/10/2019; 1:00 pm, ESPN2		at South Florida	W 54–52	12–11 (6–4)	Yuengling Center; Tampa, FL
02/16/2019; 12:00 pm		East Carolina	W 63–52	13–11 (7–4)	Fertitta Center; Houston, TX
02/20/2019; 7:00 pm, ESPN3		Tulane	W 83–82 ^{OT}	14–11 (8–4)	Fertitta Center; Houston, TX
02/24/2019; 1:00 pm, ESPNU		at Memphis	W 59–57	15–11 (9–4)	Elma Roane Fieldhouse (657); Memphis, TN
02/27/2019; 7:00 pm, ESPN3		South Florida	L 49–59	15–12 (9–5)	Fertitta Center (919); Houston, TX
03/02/2019; 12:00 pm, SNY/ESPN3		at No. 2 Connecticut	L 61–83	15–13 (9–6)	Harry A. Gampel Pavilion (10,167); Storrs, CT
03/04/2019; 6:00 pm, CBSSN		UCF	L 50–59	15–14 (9–7)	Fertitta Center; Houston, TX
AAC Women's Tournament
03/09/2019; 11:00 am, ESPN3	(4)	vs. (5) South Florida; Quarterfinals	L 55–72	15–15	Mohegan Sun Arena; Uncasville, CT
WNIT
03/21/2019*; 7:00 pm		at Arkansas; First Round	L 80–88 ^{OT}	15–16	Bud Walton Arena (3,689); Fayetteville, AR
*Non-conference game. ^{#}Rankings from AP Poll. (#) Tournament seedings in parentheses. All times are in Central Time.

== Rankings ==
Regular season polls
Poll	Pre- season	Week 2	Week 3	Week 4	Week 5	Week 6	Week 7	Week 8	Week 9	Week 10	Week 11	Week 12	Week 13	Week 14	Week 15	Week 16	Week 17	Week 18	Week 19	Final
AP																				N/A
Coaches																				

Legend
	Increase in ranking
	Decrease in ranking
	Not ranked previous week
(RV)	Received votes
(NR)	Not ranked

== See also ==
- 2018–19 Houston Cougars men's basketball team
