= 2018–19 Atlantic Coast Conference women's basketball season =

- League: NCAA Division I
- Sport: Basketball
- Teams: 15
- TV partner(s): ACC Network, ESPN, Regional Sports Networks

WNBA Draft
- Top draft pick: Jackie Young, Notre Dame
- Picked by: Las Vegas Aces, 1st overall

2018–19 NCAA Division I women's basketball season
- First Place: Notre Dame
- Runners-up: Louisville
- Season MVP: Asia Durr, Louisville

ACC Tournament
- Champions: Notre Dame
- Finals MVP: Jackie Young (Notre Dame)

Atlantic Coast Conference women's basketball seasons
- ← 2017–18 2019–20 →

2018–19 ACC women's basketball standings
	Conf.				Overall
Team	W		L	PCT	W		L	PCT
No. 3 Notre Dame†	14	–	2	.875	35	–	4	.897
No. 5 Louisville	14	–	2	.875	32	–	4	.889
No. 10 NC State	12	–	4	.750	28	–	6	.824
No. 19 Miami (FL)	12	–	4	.750	25	–	9	.735
No. 12 Syracuse	11	–	5	.688	25	–	9	.735
No. 25 Florida State	10	–	6	.625	24	–	9	.727
Clemson	9	–	7	.563	20	–	13	.606
North Carolina	8	–	8	.500	18	–	15	.545
Georgia Tech	7	–	9	.438	17	–	13	.567
Virginia Tech	6	–	10	.375	22	–	12	.647
Duke	6	–	10	.375	15	–	15	.500
Virginia	5	–	11	.313	12	–	19	.387
Boston College	3	–	13	.188	14	–	16	.467
Pittsburgh	2	–	14	.125	11	–	20	.355
Wake Forest	1	–	15	.063	10	–	20	.333
† 2019 ACC tournament winner As of March 7, 2019; Rankings from AP poll

The 2018–19 Atlantic Coast Conference women's basketball season began with practices in October 2018, followed by the start of the 2018–19 NCAA Division I women's basketball season in November. Conference play started in January 2019 and concluded in March with the 2019 ACC women's basketball tournament at the Greensboro Coliseum in Greensboro, NC.

== Head coaches ==
=== Coaching changes ===
- Erik Johnson resigned as the head coach of Boston College and Joanna Bernabei-McNamee was named as his replacement.
- Audra Smith would not be returning as coach of Clemson and Amanda Butler was named as her replacement.
- Joanne Boyle retired from Virginia after the 2017–18 season and Tina Thompson was hired as her replacement.
- Suzie McConnell-Serio would not be returning as coach of Pittsburgh and Lance White was hired as her replacement.

=== Coaches ===
Team	Head coach	Previous job	Years at school	Record at school	ACC record	ACC titles	NCAA Tournaments	NCAA Final Fours	NCAA Championships
Boston College	Joanna Bernabei-McNamee	Albany	1	0–0	0–0	0	0	0	0
Clemson	Amanda Butler	Florida	1	0–0	0–0	0	0	0	0
Duke	Joanne P. McCallie	Michigan State	12	297–80	132–38	4	10	0	0
Florida State	Sue Semrau	Wisconsin (Assistant)	22	427–240	186–138	2	14	0	0
Georgia Tech	MaChelle Joseph	Georgia Tech (Assistant)	16	294–1191	106–122	0	7	0	0
Louisville	Jeff Walz	Maryland (Assistant)	12	299–96	131–48	1	4	3	0
Miami	Katie Meier	Charlotte	14	252–163	99–99	1	7	0	0
NC State	Wes Moore	Chattanooga	6	112–51	51–29	0	3	0	0
North Carolina	Sylvia Hatchell	Francis Marion	33	732–309	289–201	7	22	3	1
Notre Dame	Muffet McGraw	Lehigh	32	800–229	404–85	4	5	8	2
Pittsburgh	Lance White	Florida State (Assistant)	1	0–0	0–0	0	0	0	0
Syracuse	Quentin Hillsman	Syracuse (Assistant)	12	117–48	55–35	0	5	1	0
Virginia	Tina Thompson	Texas (Associate Head Coach)	1	0–0	0–0	0	0	0	0
Virginia Tech	Kenny Brooks	James Madison	3	43–28	10–22	0	0	0	0
Wake Forest	Jennifer Hoover	High Point	7	88–104	29–69	0	0	0	0

Notes:

- Year at school includes 2018–19 season.
- Overall and ACC records are from time at current school and are through the end the 2017–18 season.
- NCAA Tournament appearances are from time at current school only.
- NCAA Final Fours and Championship include time at other schools

== Preseason ==
=== Preseason watch lists ===
Below is a table of notable preseason watch lists.

Lieberman	Drysdale	Miller	McClain	Leslie
Kyra Lambert - Duke; Paris Kea - North Carolina; Marina Mabrey - Notre Dame; Tiana Mangakahia - Syracuse	Asia Durr - Louisville; Arike Ogunbowale - Notre Dame	Leonna Odom - Duke; Francesca Pan - Georgia Tech; Jackie Young - Notre Dame; Miranda Drummond - Syracuse; Jocelyn Willoughby - Virginia; Elisa Penna - Wake Forest	Jessica Shepard - Notre Dame	Jade Williams - Duke; Sam Fuehring - Louisville; Janelle Bailey - North Carolina; Brianna Turner - Notre Dame

=== ACC Women's Basketball Tip-off ===
Prior to the start of the season, the ACC hosted a media day at the Sheraton/Le Méridien Hotel in Charlotte, North Carolina. At the media day, the head coaches voted on the finishing order of the teams, an All-ACC team, a Preseason Player of the Year, and Newcomers to watch. The media day was hosted on October 2, 2018. A selected group of student athletes also took questions from the media on this day. This question and answer period was live streamed on theacc.com.

At the media day, both the Head Coaches and the Blue Ribbon Panel selected Notre Dame to defend their title.

==== ACC preseason polls ====
2018 ACC Women's Basketball Preseason Polls
Head coaches	Blue Ribbon Panel
1. Notre Dame – 225 (15); 2. Louisville – 210; 3. Syracuse – 178; 4. NC State – 165; 5. Miami – 160; 6. Duke – 141; 7. North Carolina – 127; 8. Florida State – 124; 9. Georgia Tech – 112; 10. Virginia Tech – 108; 11. Virginia – 95; 12. Wake Forest – 57; 13. Pittsburgh – 41; 14. Clemson – 32; 15. Boston College – 25	1. Notre Dame – 927 (59); 2. Louisville – 870 (3); 3. Syracuse – 730; 4. NC State – 671; 5. Duke – 652; 6. Miami – 577; 7. Florida State – 572; 8. North Carolina – 462; 9. Virginia – 450; 10. Georgia Tech – 432; 11. Virginia Tech – 424; 12. Wake Forest – 269; 13. Pittsburgh – 157; 14. Boston College – 126; 15. Clemson – 121

Note: First Place votes shown in ().

==== Preseason All-ACC Teams ====
2018 ACC Women's Basketball Preseason All-ACC Teams
Head coaches	Blue Ribbon Panel
Asia Durr – Louisville; Janelle Bailey – North Carolina; Paris Kea – North Carolina; Marina Mabrey – Notre Dame; Arike Ogunbowale – Notre Dame; Jessica Shepard – Notre Dame; Brianna Turner – Notre Dame; Tiana Mangakahia – Syracuse; Taylor Emery – Virginia Tech; Elisa Penna – Wake Forest	Asia Durr – Louisville; Janelle Bailey – North Carolina; Paris Kea – North Carolina; Marina Mabrey – Notre Dame; Arike Ogunbowale – Notre Dame; Jessica Shepard – Notre Dame; Brianna Turner – Notre Dame; Tiana Mangakahia – Syracuse; Taylor Emery – Virginia Tech; Elisa Penna – Wake Forest

==== Preseason ACC Player of the Year ====
2018 ACC Women's Basketball Preseason Player of the Year
Head coaches	Blue Ribbon Panel
Arike Ogunbowale - Notre Dame	Arike Ogunbowale - Notre Dame

==== Newcomer Watchlist ====
2018 ACC Women's Basketball Newcomer Watchlists
Head coaches	Blue Ribbon Panel
Elizabeth Balogun – Georgia Tech; Elizabeth Dixon – Georgia Tech; Beatrice Mompremier – Miami; Jordan Nixon – Notre Dame; Emily Engstler – Syracuse	Kiah Gillespie – Florida State; Elizabeth Dixon – Georgia Tech; Beatrice Mompremier – Miami; Jordan Nixon – Notre Dame; Emily Engstler – Syracuse

== Regular season ==
=== Rankings ===
Legend
Increase in ranking
Decrease in ranking
Not ranked previous week
First Place votes shown in ()

		Pre	Wk 2	Wk 3	Wk 4	Wk 5	Wk 6	Wk 7	Wk 8	Wk 9	Wk 10	Wk 11	Wk 12	Wk 13	Wk 14	Wk 15	Wk 16	Wk 17	Wk 18	Wk 19	Final
Boston College	AP																				
Boston College	C																				
Clemson	AP											RV	RV	RV			RV	RV			
Clemson	C											RV									
Duke	AP	21	RV	RV																	
Duke	C	20	RV	RV																	
Florida State	AP	RV	RV		RV	RV	RV	RV	RV	RV	22	RV	22	24	24	21	22	22	22 т	25	25
Florida State	C	RV	RV	RV	RV	RV	RV	25	23	18	21	19	21	19	19	20	21	21	22	22	23
Georgia Tech	AP			RV																	
Georgia Tech	C																				
Louisville	AP	5	5	5	5	5	4	3	3	3	2 (10)	4	4	3 (2)	2 (3)	2 (3)	4	3	3	5	5
Louisville	C	4	4	4	4	3	3	3	3	2 (9)	4	4	3	2 (3)	2 (2)	4 т	3	3	5	5	6
Miami	AP	25	24	24	21	25	24	24	24	RV	RV		RV	RV	25	20	14	15	16	19	19
Miami	C	24	22	20	23	22	23	23	RV	23	RV	23	23	25	20	14	15 т	15	16	15	20
North Carolina	AP				RV	RV	RV								RV						
North Carolina	C													RV	RV						
NC State	AP	17	17	15	13	10	10	10	9	9	8	8	8	7	9	12	9	10	9	10	10
NC State	C	16	13	13	10	10	10	9	9	8	8	8	7	9	11	12	10	11	10	10	9
Notre Dame	AP	1 (31)	1 (30)	1 (31)	1 (31)	2	2	2	2	2	1 (12)	1 (23)	1 (22)	5	4	6	5	4	4	3	3
Notre Dame	C	1 (30)	1 (30)	1 (32)	2	2	2	2	2	1 (15)	1 (26)	1 (26)	5 (1)	4 (1)	6	4 т	4	4	3	3	2
Pittsburgh	AP																				
Pittsburgh	C																				
Syracuse	AP	18	18	14	12	15	15	15	15	14	12	12	13	18	15	16	18	17	18	15	12
Syracuse	C	18	15	12	14	14	14	14	14	12	12	14	16	14	16	18	17	16	14	12	16
Virginia	AP	RV																			
Virginia	C																				
Virginia Tech	AP	RV	RV	RV	RV	RV	RV	RV	RV	RV	RV										
Virginia Tech	C		RV	RV	RV	RV	RV	RV	25	RV	RV										
Wake Forest	AP																				
Wake Forest	C																				

Note: The Coaches Poll releases a final poll after the NCAA tournament, but the AP Poll does not release a poll at this time.

=== Conference matrix ===
This table summarizes the head-to-head results between teams in conference play. Each team will play 16 conference games, and at least 1 against each opponent.

	Boston College	Clemson	Duke	Florida State	Georgia Tech	Louisville	Miami	North Carolina	NC State	Notre Dame	Pittsburgh	Syracuse	Virginia	Virginia Tech	Wake Forest
vs. Boston College	–	91–58	90–92 (2OT)	91–71	81–76	87–51	76–73	93–78	85–69	92–63; 97–47	55–59	96–69; 76–59	79–77 (OT)	95–86	64–65
vs. Clemson	58–91	–	63–59	45–57; 68–73	61–71; 75–53	76–44	67–76	70–64	54–51	101–63	59–65	84–75	65–71	66–73	53–69
vs. Duke	92–90 (2OT)	59–63	–	66–62	70–64	73–51	58–50	69–85; 44–62	63–51	89–61	55–74	64–55	53–47	64–57	52–66; 44–55
vs. Florida State	71–91	57–45; 73–68	62–66	–	55–64	69–48	58–62; 64–54	63–64	70–75	97–70	46–78	94–88	61–63	54–56	61–85
vs. Georgia Tech	76–81	71–61; 53–75	64–70	64–55	–	61–44	69–56	91–90	68–60	76–55; 90–50	55–67	55–65	53–45	68–76	46–60
vs. Louisville	51–87	44–76	51–73	48–69	44–61	–	79–73	66–73	62–92	82–68	42–70; 40–67	51–76	43–91; 49–71	63–72	49–73
vs. Miami	73–76	76–67	50–58	62–58; 54–64	56–69	73–79	–	68–76	70–68	65–72	51–65	71–84	59–72	61–68; 73–65	57–72
vs. North Carolina	78–93	64–70	85–69; 62–44	64–63	90–91	73–66	76–68	–	51–64; 74–69	73–78	91–78	90–77	53–70	69–81	61–84
vs. NC State	69–85	51–54	51–63	75–70	60–68	92–62	68–70	64–51; 69–74	–	95–72	34–63	73–77	38–66	61–70 (OT)	50–59; 46–80
vs. Notre Dame	63–92; 47–97	63–101	61–89	70–97	55–76; 50–90	68–82	72–65	78–73	72–95	–	44–100	68–98	66–103	51–80	48–78
vs. Pittsburgh	59–55	65–59	74–55	78–46	0–0	70–42; 67–40	65–51	78–91	63–34	100–44	–	82–50; 90–63	74–57	74–58	64–70
vs. Syracuse	69–96; 59–76	75–84	55–64	88–94	65–55	76–51	84–71	77–90	77–73	98–68	50–82; 63–90	–	68–72	73–75 (OT)	57–77
vs. Virginia	77–79 (OT)	71–65	47–53	63–61	45–53	91–43; 71–49	72–59	70–53	66–38	103–66	57–74	72–68	–	58–62; 63–45	52–42
vs. Virginia Tech	86–95	73–66	57–64	56–54	76–68	72–63	68–61; 65–73	81–69	70–61 (OT)	80–51	58–74	75–73 (OT)	62–58; 45–63	–	57–69
vs. Wake Forest	65–64	69–53	66–52; 55–44	85–61	60–46	73–49	72–57	84–61	59–50; 80–46	78–48	70–64	77–57	42–52	69–57	–
Total	3–13	9–7	6–10	10–6	7–9	13–2	12–4	8–8	12–4	14–2	2–13	11–5	5–11	6–10	1–15

=== Player of the week ===
Throughout the conference regular season, the Atlantic Coast Conference offices named a Player(s) of the week and a Rookie(s) of the week.

Week	Player of the week	Rookie of the week	Reference
1 – Nov. 12	Asia Durr – Louisville	Valencia Myers – Florida State	
2 – Nov. 19	Arike Ogunbowale – Notre Dame	Elizabeth Dixon – Georgia Tech	
2 – Nov. 19	Arike Ogunbowale – Notre Dame	Maeve Dialdi-Tabdi – Syracuse	
3 – Nov. 26	Tiana Mangakahia – Syracuse	Marnelle Garraud – Florida State	
4 – Dec. 3	Asia Durr (2) – Louisville	Maeve Dialdi-Tabdi (2) – Syracuse	
5 – Dec. 10	Asia Durr (3) – Louisville	Elissa Cunane – NC State	
6 – Dec. 17	Simone Westbrook – Clemson	Elizabeth Balogun – Georgia Tech	
7 – Dec. 24	Arike Ogunbowale (2) – Notre Dame	Elizabeth Balogun (2) – Georgia Tech	
8 – Dec. 31	Janelle Bailey – North Carolina	Miela Goodchild – Duke	
9 – Jan. 2	Beatrice Mompremier – Miami	Elizabeth Balogun (3) – Georgia Tech	
9 – Jan. 2	Tiana Mangakahia (2) – Syracuse	Elizabeth Balogun (3) – Georgia Tech	
10 – Jan. 14	Tiana Mangakahia (3) – Syracuse	Makayla Dickens – Boston College	
10 – Jan. 14	Tiana Mangakahia (3) – Syracuse	Elizabeth Dixon (2) – Georgia Tech	
11 – Jan. 21	Beatrice Mompremier (2) – Miami	Elizabeth Balogun (4) – Georgia Tech	
12 – Jan. 28	Paris Kea – North Carolina	Elissa Cunane (2) – NC State	
13 – Feb. 4	Regan Magarity – Virginia Tech	Dara Mabrey – Virginia Tech	
14 – Feb. 11	Beatrice Mompremier (3) – Miami	Elizabeth Dixon (3) – Georgia Tech	
15 – Feb. 18	Emese Hof – Miami	Elissa Cunane (3) – NC State	
16 – Feb. 25	Paris Kea (2) – North Carolina	Miela Goodchild (2) – Duke	
17 – Mar. 4	Tiana Mangakahia (4) – Syracuse	Elissa Cunane (4) – NC State	

== Postseason ==
=== ACC tournament ===
First round
12	Virginia	77
13	Boston College	61
10	Virginia Tech	85
15	Wake Forest	63
11	Duke	86
14	Pittsburgh	64

Second round
8	North Carolina	80
9	Georgia Tech	73
5	Syracuse	67
12	Virginia	57
7	Clemson	80^{OT}
10	Virginia Tech	76
6	Florida State	51
11	Duke	41

Quarterfinals
1	Notre Dame	95
8	North Carolina	77
4	Miami	85
5	Syracuse	92
2	Louisville	75
7	Clemson	67
3	NC State	69
6	Florida State	62

Semifinals
1	Notre Dame	91
5	Syracuse	66
2	Louisville	78
3	NC State	68

Championship
1	Notre Dame	99
2	Louisville	79

=== NCAA tournament ===
The ACC sent a record tying eight teams to the NCAA Tournament, including two number 1 seeds. Eight teams were also selected in 2014, 2015, and 2018. Eight teams was the most out of any conference this year.

Seed	Region	School	1st Round	2nd Round	Sweet 16	Elite Eight	Final Four	Championship
1	Albany	Louisville	W 69–34 vs. #16 Robert Morris – (Louisville)	W 71–50 vs. #8 Michigan – (Louisville)	W 61–44 vs. #4 Oregon State – (Albany)	L 73–80 vs. #2 Connecticut – (Albany)		
1	Chicago	Notre Dame	W 92–50 vs. #16 Bethune–Cookman – (South Bend)	W 91–63 vs. #8 Michigan State – (South Bend)	W 87–80 vs. #4 Texas A&M – (Chicago)	W 84–68 vs. #2 Stanford – (Chicago)	W 81–76 vs. #2 Connecticut – (Tampa)	L 81–82 vs. #1 Baylor – (Tampa)
3	Greensboro	NC State	W 63–51 vs. #14 Maine – (Raleigh)	W 72–57 vs. #6 Kentucky – (Raleigh)	L 61–79 vs. #2 Iowa – (Greensboro)			
3	Portland	Syracuse	W 70–49 vs. #14 Fordham – (Syracuse)	L 64–75 vs. #6 South Dakota State – (Syracuse)				
4	Portland	Miami	W 69–62 vs. #13 Florida Gulf Coast – (Miami)	L 55–57 vs. #5 Arizona State – (Miami)				
5	Greensboro	Florida State	W 70–69 vs. #12 Bucknell – (Charlotte)	L 64–72 vs. #4 South Carolina – (Charlotte)				
9	Portland	Clemson	W 79–66 vs. #8 South Dakota – (Starkville)	L 61–85 vs. #1 Mississippi State – (Starkville)				
9	Greensboro	North Carolina	L 72–81 vs. #8 California – (Waco)					
		W–L (%):	7–1 (.875)	3–4 (.429)	2–1 (.667)	1–1 (.500)	1–0 (1.000)	0–1 (.000) Total: 14–8 (.636)

=== National Invitation tournament ===
School	1st Round	2nd Round	3rd Round	Quarterfinals	Semifinals	Championship
Virginia Tech	W 92–65 vs. Furman – (Blacksburg)	W 82–72 vs. VCU – (Blacksburg)	L 66–70 vs. James Madison – (Harrisonburg)			
W–L (%):	1–0 (1.000)	1–0 (1.000)	0–1 (.000)	0–0 (–)	0–0 (–)	0–0 (–) Total: 2–1 (.667)

== Honors and awards ==
=== ACC Awards ===
2018 ACC Women's Basketball Individual Awards
Award	Recipient(s)
Player of the Year	Asia Durr – Louisville
Coach of the Year	Amanda Butler – Clemson
Defensive Player of the Year	Brianna Turner – Notre Dame
Rookie of the Year	Elizabeth Balogun – Georgia Tech
Sixth Player of the Year	Dana Evans – Louisville
Most Improved Player	Emese Hof – Miami

2018 ACC Women's Basketball All-Conference Teams( as voted on by the league's Blue Ribbon Panel)
First Team	Second Team	Freshman Team
Haley Gorecki, Jr., G, Duke; Kiah Gillespie, Jr., F, Florida State; Asia Durr, Sr., G, Louisville; Beatrice Mompremier, Jr., F, Miami; Emese Hof, Sr., F/C, Miami; Kiara Leslie, Sr., G, NC State; Paris Kea, Gr., G, North Carolina; Arike Ogunbowale, Sr., G, Notre Dame; Jessica Shepard, Sr., F, Notre Dame; Tiana Mangakahia, Jr., G, Syracuse	Janelle Bailey, So., C, North Carolina; Brianna Turner, Gr., F, Notre Dame; Jackie Young, Jr., G, Notre Dame; Taylor Emery, Sr., G, Virginia Tech; Regan Magarity, Sr., F, Virginia Tech	Makayla Dickens, G, Boston College; Miela Goodchild, G, Duke; Valencia Myers, F, Florida State; Elizabeth Balogun, G, Georgia Tech; Elizabeth Dixon, F, Georgia Tech; Elissa Cunane, C, NC State; Maeva Djaldi-Tabdi, F, Syracuse; Dara Mabrey, G, Virginia Tech

2018 ACC Women's Basketball All-Conference Teams( as voted on by the league's Head Coaches)
First Team	Second Team	Freshman Team
Kiah Gillespie, Jr., F, Florida State; Asia Durr, Sr., G, Louisville; Emese Hof, Jr., F, Miami; Beatrice Mompremier, Sr., F/C, Miami; Paris Kea, Sr., G, North Carolina; Kiara Leslie, Gr., G, NC State; Arike Ogunbowale, Sr., G, Notre Dame; Jessica Shepard, Sr., F, Notre Dame; Tiana Mangakahia, Jr., G, Syracuse; Taylor Emery, Sr., G, Virginia Tech	Kobi Thornton, Jr., G, Clemson; Haley Gorecki, Jr., G, Duke; Marina Mabrey, Sr., G, Notre Dame; Jackie Young, Jr., G, Notre Dame; Regan Magarity, Sr., F, Virginia Tech	Makayla Dickens, G, Boston College; Miela Goodchild, G, Duke; Valencia Myers, F, Florida State; Elizabeth Balogun, G, Georgia Tech; Elizabeth Dixon, F, Georgia Tech; Elissa Cunane, C, NC State; Maeva Djaldi-Tabdi, F, Syracuse; Dara Mabrey, G, Virginia Tech

2018 ACC Women's Basketball All-Conference Defensive Team

Danielle Edwards, Sr., G, Clemson
Simone Westbrook, Gr., G, Clemson
Emese Hof, Sr., F/C, Miami
Kiara Leslie, Gr., G, NC State
Brianna Turner, Gr., F, Notre Dame

== WNBA draft ==
Player	Team	Round	Pick #	Position	School
Jackie Young	Las Vegas Aces	1	1	G	Notre Dame
Asia Durr	New York Liberty	1	2	G	Louisville
Arike Ogunbowale	Dallas Wings	1	5	G	Notre Dame
Kiara Leslie	Washington Mystics	1	10	G	NC State
Brianna Turner	Atlanta Dream	1	12	F	Notre Dame
Jessica Shepard	Minnesota Lynx	2	16	F	Notre Dame
Marina Mabrey	Los Angeles Sparks	2	19	G	Notre Dame
Paris Kea	Indiana Fever	3	25	G	North Carolina
Arica Carter	Phoenix Mercury	3	32	G	Louisville
Regan Magarity	Connecticut Sun	3	33	F	Virginia Tech
Sam Fuehring	Washington Mystics	3	34	F	Louisville
