= Lance White (disambiguation) =

Lance White is a Canadian politician.

Lance White may also refer to:

- Lance White (basketball), American college basketball coach
- Lance White, a character played by Tom Selleck on The Rockford Files
