= 2018–19 Georgia Tech Yellow Jackets women's basketball team =

Intercollegiate basketball season

2018–19 Georgia Tech Yellow Jackets women's basketball
- Conference: Atlantic Coast Conference
- Record: 17–13 (7–9 ACC)
- Head coach: MaChelle Joseph (16th season)
- Assistant coaches: Mark Simons; Sasha Palmer; Jonneshia Pineda
- Home arena: McCamish Pavilion

2018–19 ACC women's basketball standings
	Conf.				Overall
Team	W		L	PCT	W		L	PCT
No. 3 Notre Dame†	14	–	2	.875	35	–	4	.897
No. 5 Louisville	14	–	2	.875	32	–	4	.889
No. 10 NC State	12	–	4	.750	28	–	6	.824
No. 19 Miami (FL)	12	–	4	.750	25	–	9	.735
No. 12 Syracuse	11	–	5	.688	25	–	9	.735
No. 25 Florida State	10	–	6	.625	24	–	9	.727
Clemson	9	–	7	.563	20	–	13	.606
North Carolina	8	–	8	.500	18	–	15	.545
Georgia Tech	7	–	9	.438	17	–	13	.567
Virginia Tech	6	–	10	.375	22	–	12	.647
Duke	6	–	10	.375	15	–	15	.500
Virginia	5	–	11	.313	12	–	19	.387
Boston College	3	–	13	.188	14	–	16	.467
Pittsburgh	2	–	14	.125	11	–	20	.355
Wake Forest	1	–	15	.063	10	–	20	.333
† 2019 ACC tournament winner As of March 7, 2019; Rankings from AP poll

The 2018–19 Georgia Tech Yellow Jackets women's basketball team represented Georgia Institute of Technology during the 2018–19 NCAA Division I women's basketball season. Returning as head coach was MaChelle Joseph in her 16th season. The team played its home games at McCamish Pavilion in Atlanta, Georgia as members of the Atlantic Coast Conference (ACC). They finished the season 17–13, 7–9 in ACC play, to finish in ninth place. They lost in the second round of the ACC women's tournament to North Carolina. Despite having 17 wins, they were not invited to a postseason tournament for the first time since 2013.

Less than a month after being placed on leave for a personnel matter, Georgia Tech fired Joseph on March 26 after 16 seasons. She finished her tenure with 311 wins, the most in program history. On April 9, Georgia Tech hired coaching veteran and ESPN analyst Nell Fortner, whose most recent coaching job had been an eight-season stint at Auburn.

== Previous season ==
They finished the 2017–18 season 20–14, 6–10 in ACC play, to finish in tenth place. They advanced to the second round of the ACC women's tournament where they lost to Virginia. They were invited to the Women's National Invitation Tournament where they advanced to the third round where they lost to Alabama.

== Off-season ==
=== Recruiting class ===
College recruiting information
Name	Hometown	School	Height	Weight	Commit date
Elizabeth Balogun; G	Lagos, Nigeria	Hamilton Heights	6 ft 0 in (1.83 m)	N/A	
Elizabeth Balogun; G	Recruit ratings: ESPN: (98)				
Elizabeth Dixon; F	Memphis, TN	Ridgeway	6 ft 3 in (1.91 m)	N/A	
Elizabeth Dixon; F	Recruit ratings: ESPN: (98)				
D'asia Gregg; G	Florence, SC	Wilson	6 ft 2 in (1.88 m)	N/A	
D'asia Gregg; G	Recruit ratings: ESPN: (91)				
Jasmine Carson; G	Memphis, TN	McEachern	5 ft 10 in (1.78 m)	N/A	
Jasmine Carson; G	Recruit ratings: ESPN: (90)				
Lotta-Mah Lahtinen; PG	Helsinki, Finland	N/A	5 ft 8 in (1.73 m)	N/A	
Lotta-Mah Lahtinen; PG	Recruit ratings: ESPN: (90)				
Overall recruit ranking:
Note: In many cases, Scout, Rivals, 247Sports, On3, and ESPN may conflict in their listings of height and weight.; In these cases, the average was taken. ESPN grades are on a 100-point scale.; Sources:

== Roster ==
2018–19 Georgia Tech Yellow Jackets women's basketball team
Players
Coaches

Pos.	#	Name	Height	Year	Previous school	Hometown
F	00	Daijah Jefferson	6 ft 2 in (1.88 m)	RS Fr	Hopewell	Hopewell, VA
G	2	Jasmine Carson	5 ft 10 in (1.78 m)	Fr	McEachern	Memphis, TN
F	4	Anne Francoise Diouf	6 ft 4 in (1.93 m)	RS So	IMG Academy	Dakar, Senegal
G	5	Elizabeth Balogun	6 ft 1 in (1.85 m)	Fr	Hamilton Heights	Lagos, Nigeria
G	12	Kondalia Montgomery	5 ft 7 in (1.7 m)	Fr	Lincoln	Tacoma, WA
G	13	Lorela Cubaj	6 ft 4 in (1.93 m)	So	Istituto Paritario G. Parini	Terni, Italy
F	22	Liz Dixon	6 ft 5 in (1.96 m)	Fr	Ridgeway	Memphis, TN
F	23	D'asia Gregg	6 ft 2 in (1.88 m)	Fr	Wilson	Florence, SC
G	24	Chanin Scott	6 ft 0 in (1.83 m)	Jr	Meyers Park	Charlotte, NC
G	31	Lotta-Maj Lahtinen	5 ft 7 in (1.7 m)	Fr	None	Helsinki, Finland
G	33	Francesca Pan	6 ft 1 in (1.85 m)	Jr	None	Bassano del Grappa, Italy
G	41	Kierra Fletcher	5 ft 9 in (1.75 m)	So	Warren Cousino	Warren, MI
F	44	Martine Fortune	6 ft 3 in (1.91 m)	Sr	Shipley School	Philadelphia, PA

Head coach

- MaChelle Joseph (Purdue)

Assistant coach(es)

- Mark Simons (Aquinas (MI))
- Sasha Palmer (Northern Michigan)
- Jonneshia Pineda (Georgia Southwestern State)

Legend

- (C) Team captain
- (S) Suspended
- (I) Ineligible
- (W) Walk-on
- Injured
- Current redshirt

Roster
Last update: October 17, 2018

== Schedule ==
Date time, TV	Rank^{#}	Opponent^{#}	Result	Record	Site (attendance) city, state
Exhibition
November 4, 2018*; 2:00 p.m., ACCN Extra		Coastal Georgia	W 95–46	–	McCamish Pavilion (731); Atlanta, GA
Non-conference regular season
November 9, 2018*; 8:00 p.m.		at Houston	L 89–95 ^{2OT}	0–1	H&PE Arena (791); Houston, TX
November 11, 2018*; 2:00 p.m., ACCN Extra		Appalachian State	W 71–53	1–1	McCamish Pavilion (887); Atlanta, GA
November 14, 2018*; 7:00 p.m., ACCN Extra		Western Carolina	W 84–49	2–1	McCamish Pavilion (730); Atlanta, GA
November 18, 2018*; 2:00 p.m., ACCN Extra		No. 14 Georgia; Rivalry	W 63–53	3–1	McCamish Pavilion (2,407); Atlanta, GA
November 22, 2018*; 4:00 p.m.		vs. George Washington; Cancún Challenge Riviera Division	W 70–55	4–1	Moon Palace Golf & Spa Resort (300); Cancún, Mexico
November 23, 2018*; 6:30 p.m.		vs. Idaho State; Cancún Challenge Riviera Division	W 74–51	5–1	Moon Palace Golf & Spa Resort (300); Cancún, Mexico
November 29, 2018*; 6:30 p.m., BTN		at No. 7 Maryland; ACC–Big Ten Women's Challenge	L 54–67	5–2	Xfinity Center (4,108); College Park, MD
December 2, 2018*; 2:00 p.m., ESPN+		at Georgia State	W 78–71	6–2	GSU Sports Arena (797); Atlanta, GA
December 5, 2018*; 2:00 p.m., ACCN Extra		Alabama State	W 69–42	7–2	McCamish Pavilion (800); Atlanta, GA
December 16, 2018*; 4:00 p.m., ACCN Extra		Kennesaw State	W 60–35	8–2	McCamish Pavilion (1,014); Atlanta, GA
December 20, 2018*; 12:30 p.m.		vs. Seton Hall; West Palm Invitational	W 84–73	9–2	Student Life Center (123); West Palm Beach, FL
December 21, 2018*; 2:00 p.m.		vs. Dayton; West Palm Invitational	L 66–85	9–3	Student Life Center (178); West Palm Beach, FL
December 30, 2018*; 2:00 p.m., ACCN Extra		Wofford	W 81–40	10–3	McCamish Pavilion (1,165); Atlanta, GA
ACC regular season
January 3, 2019; 7:00 p.m., ACCN Extra		at Boston College	W 81–76	11–3 (1–0)	Conte Forum (1,254); Chestnut Hill, MA
January 6, 2019; 3:00 p.m., RSN		No. 2 Notre Dame	L 55–76	11–4 (1–1)	McCamish Pavilion (3,209); Atlanta, GA
January 10, 2019; 7:00 p.m., ACCN Extra		Duke	W 70–64	12–4 (2–1)	McCamish Pavilion (1,485); Atlanta, GA
January 13, 2019; 7:00 p.m., ACCN Extra		at No. 2 Louisville	L 44–61	12–5 (2–2)	KFC Yum! Center (10,514); Louisville, KY
January 17, 2019; 7:00 p.m., ACCN Extra		at Clemson	L 61–71	12–6 (2–3)	Littlejohn Coliseum (675); Clemson, SC
January 20, 2019; 2:00 p.m., ACCN Extra		No. 12 Syracuse	W 65–55	13–6 (3–3)	McCamish Pavilion (2,106); Atlanta, GA
January 27, 2019; 2:00 p.m., ACCN Extra		No. 8 NC State	L 60–68	13–7 (3–4)	McCamish Pavilion (2,014); Atlanta, GA
January 31, 2019; 7:00 p.m., ACCN Extra		at North Carolina	L 90–91	13–8 (3–5)	Carmichael Arena (1,954); Chapel Hill, NC
February 3, 2019; 12:00 p.m., ACCN Extra		at No. 5 Notre Dame	L 50–90	13–9 (3–6)	Edmund P. Joyce Center (8,530); Notre Dame, IN
February 7, 2019; 7:00 p.m., ACCN Extra		Pittsburgh	W 67–55	14–9 (4–6)	McCamish Pavilion (987); Atlanta, GA
February 10, 2019; 1:00 p.m., ACCN Extra		at Wake Forest	W 60–46	15–9 (5–6)	LJVM Coliseum (1,017); Winston-Salem, NC
February 17, 2019; 7:00 p.m., RSN		Virginia Tech	W 76–68	16–9 (6–6)	McCamish Pavilion (1,445); Atlanta, GA
February 21, 2019; 7:00 p.m., ACCN Extra		Clemson	W 75–53	17–9 (7–6)	McCamish Pavilion (1,119); Atlanta, GA
February 24, 2019; 3:00 p.m., RSN		at Virginia	L 45–53	17–10 (7–7)	John Paul Jones Arena (3,834); Charlottesville, VA
February 28, 2019; 7:00 p.m., RSN		at No. 15 Miami	L 56–69	17–11 (7–8)	Watsco Center (1,151); Miami, FL
March 3, 2019; 1:00 p.m., ACCN Extra		No. 22 Florida State	L 55–64	17–12 (7–9)	McCamish Pavilion (1,567); Atlanta, GA
ACC women's tournament
March 7, 2019; 2:00 p.m., RSN	(9)	vs. (8) North Carolina; Second round	L 73–80	17–13	Greensboro Coliseum (3,413); Greensboro, NC
*Non-conference game. ^{#}Rankings from AP poll. (#) Tournament seedings in parentheses. All times are in Eastern.

== Rankings ==
Regular season polls
Poll	Pre- Season	Week 2	Week 3	Week 4	Week 5	Week 6	Week 7	Week 8	Week 9	Week 10	Week 11	Week 12	Week 13	Week 14	Week 15	Week 16	Week 17	Week 18	Week 19	Final
AP			RV																	N/A
Coaches																				

Legend
	;	Increase in ranking
	;	Decrease in ranking
	;	Not ranked previous week
(RV)	;	Received votes

== See also ==
- 2018–19 Georgia Tech Yellow Jackets men's basketball team
