= 2018–19 Pittsburgh Panthers women's basketball team =

Intercollegiate basketball season

2018–19 Pittsburgh Panthers women's basketball
- Conference: Atlantic Coast Conference
- Record: 11–20 (2–14 ACC)
- Head coach: Lance White (1st season)
- Assistant coaches: Danielle Atkinson; Terri Mitchell; Josh Petersen
- Home arena: Petersen Events Center

2018–19 ACC women's basketball standings
	Conf.				Overall
Team	W		L	PCT	W		L	PCT
No. 3 Notre Dame†	14	–	2	.875	35	–	4	.897
No. 5 Louisville	14	–	2	.875	32	–	4	.889
No. 10 NC State	12	–	4	.750	28	–	6	.824
No. 19 Miami (FL)	12	–	4	.750	25	–	9	.735
No. 12 Syracuse	11	–	5	.688	25	–	9	.735
No. 25 Florida State	10	–	6	.625	24	–	9	.727
Clemson	9	–	7	.563	20	–	13	.606
North Carolina	8	–	8	.500	18	–	15	.545
Georgia Tech	7	–	9	.438	17	–	13	.567
Virginia Tech	6	–	10	.375	22	–	12	.647
Duke	6	–	10	.375	15	–	15	.500
Virginia	5	–	11	.313	12	–	19	.387
Boston College	3	–	13	.188	14	–	16	.467
Pittsburgh	2	–	14	.125	11	–	20	.355
Wake Forest	1	–	15	.063	10	–	20	.333
† 2019 ACC tournament winner As of March 7, 2019; Rankings from AP poll

The 2018–19 Pittsburgh Panthers women's basketball team represented Pittsburgh University during the 2018–19 NCAA Division I women's basketball season. The Panthers, led by first-year head coach Lane White, played their home games at the Petersen Events Center as members of the Atlantic Coast Conference. They finished the season 11–20, 2–14 in ACC play to finish in 14th place. They lost in the first round of the ACC women's tournament to Duke.

== Previous season ==
The Panthers finished the season 10–20, 2–14 in ACC play to finish in a tie for thirteenth place. They lost in the first round of the ACC women's tournament to Wake Forest. On April 5, the previous head coach Suzie McConnell-Serio was fired. She finished at Pittsburgh with a five-year record of 67–87.

== Off-season ==
=== Recruiting class ===
College recruiting
Name	Hometown	School	Height	Weight	Commit date
Jahsyni Knight; PG	Perth Amboy, New Jersey	Rutgers Preparatory School	5 ft 8 in (1.73 m)	N/A	
Jahsyni Knight; PG	Recruit ratings: ESPN: (92)				
Tehya Lyons; PG	Norcross, Georgia	Norcross High School	5 ft 7 in (1.70 m)	N/A	
Tehya Lyons; PG	Recruit ratings: ESPN: (90)				
Ismini Prapa; PG	Athens, Greece	American Community Schools	5 ft 8 in (1.73 m)	N/A	
Ismini Prapa; PG	Recruit ratings: ESPN: (90)				
Overall recruit ranking:
Note: In many cases, Scout, Rivals, 247Sports, On3, and ESPN may conflict in their listings of height and weight.; In these cases, the average was taken. ESPN grades are on a 100-point scale.; Sources:

== Roster ==
2018–19 Pittsburgh Panthers women's basketball team
Players
Coaches

Pos.	#	Name	Height	Year	Previous school	Hometown
G	0	Jahsyni Knight	5 ft 8 in (1.73 m)	Fr	Rutgers Prep	Perth Amboy, NJ
F	1	Danielle Garven	6 ft 1 in (1.85 m)	Sr	St. John Paul II; Chipola	Toronto, ON
G	2	Aysia Bugg	5 ft 7 in (1.7 m)	RS Sr	Bolingbrook	Chicago, IL
G	3	Jasmine Whitney	5 ft 9 in (1.75 m)	Jr	Paul IV	Centreville, VA
G	4	Cassidy Walsh	5 ft 7 in (1.7 m)	Sr	Seton-La Salle	Pittsburgh, PA
G	10	Ismini Prapa	5 ft 7 in (1.7 m)	Fr	American Community School of Athens	Athens, Greece
C	11	Cara Judkins	6 ft 2 in (1.88 m)	So	Our Lady of Good Counsel	Bethesda, MD
F	12	Tehya Lyons	5 ft 7 in (1.7 m)	RS Fr	Norcross	Norcross, GA
G	13	Kyla Nelson	5 ft 11 in (1.8 m)	So	Oaklands	Worthing, England
F	14	Kauai Bradley	6 ft 0 in (1.83 m)	Sr	Marian Catholic	Chicago, IL
G	20	Pika Rodriguez	5 ft 11 in (1.8 m)	So	Capital Prep Magnet	Hartford, CT
F	22	Jaala Henry	6 ft 3 in (1.91 m)	So	National Christian Academy	Riverdale, MD
G	23	Alayna Gribble	6 ft 0 in (1.83 m)	Jr	Norwin	Pittsburgh, PA
F	32	Kalista Walters	6 ft 1 in (1.85 m)	Sr	Bethlehem Catholic	Fleetwood, PA
F	44	Magatte Sall	6 ft 2 in (1.88 m)	Fr	Victory Rock Prep	Thiès, Senegal

Head coach

- Lance White (Texas Tech)

Assistant coach(es)

- Danielle Atkinson (Florida)
- Terri Mitchell (Duquesne)
- Josh Petersen (Florida State)

Legend

- (C) Team captain
- (S) Suspended
- (I) Ineligible
- (W) Walk-on
- Injured
- Current redshirt

Roster
Last update: October 26, 2018

== Schedule ==
Date time, TV	Rank^{#}	Opponent^{#}	Result	Record	Site (attendance) city, state
Exhibition
October 30, 2018*; 7:00 pm		Gannon	W 68–46	–	Peterson Events Center (417); Pittsburgh, PA
Non-conference regular season
November 6, 2018*; 11:00 am, ACCN Extra		UCF	L 58–61	0–1	Peterson Events Center (8,357); Pittsburgh, PA
November 9, 2018*; 4:00 pm, ACCN Extra		New Orleans	W 90–38	1–1	Peterson Events Center (531); Pittsburgh, PA
November 13, 2018*; 7:00 pm, ACCN Extra		Youngstown State	L 55–64	1–2	Peterson Events Center (568); Pittsburgh, PA
November 16, 2018*; 7:00 pm, ACCN Extra		Cincinnati	W 65–48	2–2	Peterson Events Center (735); Pittsburgh, PA
November 19, 2018*; 7:00 pm		at Georgetown	L 41–70	2–3	McDonough Gymnasium (399); Washington, D.C.
November 23, 2018*; 6:00 pm		vs. Wisconsin; Challenge in Music City	L 42–57	2–4	Nashville Municipal Auditorium (750); Nashville, TN
November 24, 2018*; 8:30 pm		vs. Arkansas; Challenge in Music City	W 61–54	3–4	Nashville Municipal Auditorium; Nashville, TN
November 25, 2018*; 6:00 pm		vs. Tennessee State; Challenge in Music City	W 78–56	4–4	Nashville Municipal Auditorium; Nashville, TN
November 29, 2018*; 8:00 pm		at Northwestern; ACC–Big Ten Women's Challenge	W 52–49	5–4	Welsh–Ryan Arena (411); Evanston, IL
December 5, 2018*; 7:00 pm, ACCN Extra		Fordham	W 65–62	6–4	Peterson Events Center (569); Pittsburgh, PA
December 8, 2018*; 3:00 pm, ACCN Extra		West Virginia; Backyard Brawl	L 43–77	6–5	Peterson Events Center (674); Pittsburgh, PA
December 18, 2018*; 7:00 pm, ACCN Extra		UNC Wilmington	W 60–56	7–5	Peterson Events Center (435); Pittsburgh, PA
December 21, 2018*; 7:00 pm, ACCN Extra		Saint Francis (PA)	W 78–75 ^{OT}	8–5	Peterson Events Center (626); Pittsburgh, PA
December 29, 2018*; 2:00 pm, ATTSNPT		at Duquesne; City Game	W 66–58	9–5	Palumbo Center (2,234); Pittsburgh, PA
ACC regular season
January 3, 2019; 7:00 pm, ACCN Extra		at No. 2 Notre Dame	L 44–100	9–6 (0–1)	Edmund P. Joyce Center (8,566); South Bend, IN
January 10, 2019; 7:00 pm, ACCN Extra		at No. 8 NC State	L 34–63	9–7 (0–2)	Reynolds Coliseum (2,658); Raleigh, NC
January 13, 2019; 1:00 pm, RSN		Boston College	L 55–59	9–8 (0–3)	Peterson Events Center (2,630); Pittsburgh, PA
January 17, 2019; 7:00 pm, ACCN Extra		No. 12 Syracuse	L 50–82	9–9 (0–4)	Peterson Events Center (752); Pittsburgh, PA
January 20, 2019; 2:00 pm, ACCN Extra		Clemson	L 59–65	9–10 (0–5)	Peterson Events Center (940); Pittsburgh, PA
January 24, 2019; 7:00 pm, ACCN Extra		Virginia	L 57–74	9–11 (0–6)	Peterson Events Center (447); Pittsburgh, PA
January 27, 2019; 2:00 pm, ACCN Extra		at No. 4 Louisville	L 42–70	9–12 (0–7)	KFC Yum! Center (10,067); Louisville, KY
January 31, 2019; 7:00 pm, RSN		Virginia Tech	L 58–74	9–13 (0–8)	Peterson Events Center (588); Pittsburgh, PA
February 3, 2019; 2:00 pm, ACCN Extra		at Duke	L 55–74	9–14 (0–9)	Cameron Indoor Stadium (3,722); Durham, NC
February 7, 2019; 7:00 pm, ACCN Extra		at Georgia Tech	L 55–67	9–15 (0–10)	McCamish Pavilion (987); Atlanta, GA
February 10, 2019; 2:00 pm, ACCN Extra		No. 25 Miami (FL)	L 51–65	9–16 (0–11)	Peterson Events Center (2,495); Pittsburgh, PA
February 14, 2019; 7:00 pm, ACCN Extra		North Carolina	W 91–78	10–16 (1–11)	Peterson Events Center (754); Pittsburgh, PA
February 17, 2019; 2:00 pm, ACCN Extra		at No. 21 Florida State	L 46–78	10–17 (1–12)	Donald L. Tucker Center (3,134); Tallahassee, FL
February 21, 2019; 7:00 pm, ACCN Extra		at Syracuse	L 63–90	10–18 (1–13)	Carrier Dome (1,585); Syracuse, NY
February 28, 2019; 7:00 pm, ACCN Extra		at Wake Forest	W 70–64	11–18 (2–13)	LJVM Coliseum (589); Winston-Salem, NC
March 3, 2019; 2:00 pm, ACCN Extra		No. 3 Louisville	L 40–67	11–19 (2–14)	Peterson Events Center (1,381); Pittsburgh, PA
ACC Women's Tournament
March 6, 2019; 6:30 pm, RSN	(14)	vs. (11) Duke; First Round	L 64–86	11–20	Greensboro Coliseum (3,233); Greensboro, NC
*Non-conference game. ^{#}Rankings from AP Poll. (#) Tournament seedings in parentheses. All times are in Eastern.
