= 2019 ACC women's basketball tournament =

- Classification: Division I
- Season: 2018–19
- Teams: 15
- Site: Greensboro Coliseum; Greensboro, NC
- Champions: Notre Dame (5th title)
- Winning coach: Muffet McGraw (5th title)
- MVP: Jackie Young (Notre Dame)
- Attendance: 55,242
- Television: ESPN2, ESPNU, Raycom

2018–19 ACC women's basketball standings
	Conf.				Overall
Team	W		L	PCT	W		L	PCT
No. 3 Notre Dame†	14	–	2	.875	35	–	4	.897
No. 5 Louisville	14	–	2	.875	32	–	4	.889
No. 10 NC State	12	–	4	.750	28	–	6	.824
No. 19 Miami (FL)	12	–	4	.750	25	–	9	.735
No. 12 Syracuse	11	–	5	.688	25	–	9	.735
No. 25 Florida State	10	–	6	.625	24	–	9	.727
Clemson	9	–	7	.563	20	–	13	.606
North Carolina	8	–	8	.500	18	–	15	.545
Georgia Tech	7	–	9	.438	17	–	13	.567
Virginia Tech	6	–	10	.375	22	–	12	.647
Duke	6	–	10	.375	15	–	15	.500
Virginia	5	–	11	.313	12	–	19	.387
Boston College	3	–	13	.188	14	–	16	.467
Pittsburgh	2	–	14	.125	11	–	20	.355
Wake Forest	1	–	15	.063	10	–	20	.333
† 2019 ACC tournament winner As of March 7, 2019; Rankings from AP poll

The 2019 ACC women's basketball tournament, concluded the 2018–19 season of the Atlantic Coast Conference, which was held at Greensboro Coliseum in Greensboro, North Carolina, from March 6–10, 2019. Notre Dame, which finished atop the ACC regular-season table along with Louisville, won the tournament and with it the ACC's automatic bid to the 2019 NCAA Women's Division I Basketball Tournament.

== Seeds ==
Seeding was determine based on the regular season. Each team played 16 regular season games, at least one versus each other team in the ACC.

Seed	School	Conference record	Overall record	Tiebreaker
1	Notre Dame^{‡†}	14–2	27–3	1–0 vs. U of L
2	Louisville^{‡†}	14–2	27–2	0–1 vs. ND
3	NC State^{†}	12–4	25–4	1–0 vs. UM
4	Miami^{†}	12–4	24–7	0–1 vs. NCSU
5	Syracuse^{#}	11–5	22–7	
6	Florida State^{#}	10–6	22–7	
7	Clemson^{#}	9–7	18–11	
8	North Carolina^{#}	8–8	17–13	
9	Georgia Tech^{#}	7–9	17–12	
10	Virginia Tech	6–10	19–10	1–0 vs. Duke
11	Duke	6–10	14–14	0–1 vs. VT
12	Virginia	5–11	11–18	
13	Boston College	3–13	14–15	
14	Pittsburgh	2–14	11–19	
15	Wake Forest	1–15	10–19	
‡ – ACC regular season co-champions. † – Received a double-bye in the conference tournament. # – Received a single-bye in the conference tournament. Overall records include all games played in the ACC Tournament.

== Schedule ==
All games will be televised on the Raycom network within the ACC footprint and simulcast nationally on the ESPN networks denoted below.

Session	Game	Time	Matchup	Score	Television	Attendance
First round – Wednesday, March 6
Opening day	1	1:00 pm	#12 Virginia vs #13 Boston College	77–61	Raycom	3,172
Opening day	2	3:30 pm	#10 Virginia Tech vs #15 Wake Forest	85–63	Raycom	3,172
Opening day	3	6:30 pm	#11 Duke vs #14 Pittsburgh	86–64	Raycom	3,233
Second round – Thursday, March 7
1	4	11:00 am	#5 Syracuse vs #12 Virginia	67–57	Raycom	6,562
1	5	2:00 pm	#8 North Carolina vs #9 Georgia Tech	80–73	Raycom	3,413
2	6	6:00 pm	#7 Clemson vs #10 Virginia Tech	80–79, OT	Raycom	4,024
2	7	8:00 pm	#6 Florida State vs #11 Duke	51–41	Raycom	4,024
Quarterfinals – Friday, March 8
3	8	11:00 am	#4 Miami vs #5 Syracuse	85–92	Raycom	8,121
3	9	2:00 pm	#1 Notre Dame vs #8 North Carolina	95–77	Raycom	4,024
4	10	6:00 pm	#2 Louisville vs #7 Clemson	75–67	Raycom	5,646
4	11	8:00 pm	#3 NC State vs #6 Florida State	69–62	Raycom	5,646
Semifinals – Saturday, March 9
5	12	12:00 pm	#5 Syracuse vs #1 Notre Dame	66–91	ESPNU	6,943
5	13	2:30 pm	#2 Louisville vs #3 NC State	78–68	ESPNU	6,943
Championship – Sunday, March 10
6	14	12:00 pm	#1 Notre Dame vs #2 Louisville	99–79	ESPN2	10,104
Game times in ET. Rankings denote tournament seed.

== Bracket ==
First round Wednesday, March 6 Raycom
12	Virginia	77
13	Boston College	61
10	Virginia Tech	85
15	Wake Forest	63
11	Duke	86
14	Pittsburgh	64

Second round Thursday, March 7 Raycom
8	North Carolina	80
9	Georgia Tech	73
5	Syracuse	67
12	Virginia	57
7	Clemson	80 OT
10	Virginia Tech	79
6	Florida State	51
11	Duke	41

Quarterfinals; Friday, March 8 Raycom
1	Notre Dame	95
8	North Carolina	77
4	Miami	85
5	Syracuse	92
2	Louisville	75
7	Clemson	67
3	NC State	69
6	Florida State	62

Semifinals; Saturday, March 9 ESPNU
1	Notre Dame	91
5	Syracuse	66
2	Louisville	78
3	NC State	68

Championship; Sunday, March 10; ESPN2
1	Notre Dame	99
2	Louisville	79

== All-Tournament Teams ==
2019 ACC Women's Basketball All-Tournament Teams
First Team	Second Team
Jackie Young - Notre Dame (MVP); Asia Durr - Louisville; Jessica Shepard - Notre Dame; Tiana Mangakahia - Syracuse; Elissa Cunane - NC State	Taylor Emery - Virginia Tech; Arike Ogunbowale - Notre Dame; Aliyah Collier - Clemson; Paris Kea - North Carolina; Sam Fuehring - Louisville

== See also ==
- 2019 ACC men's basketball tournament
