= 2018–19 Virginia Tech Hokies women's basketball team =

Intercollegiate basketball season

2018–19 Virginia Tech Hokies women's basketball

WNIT, Third Round
- Conference: Atlantic Coast Conference
- Record: 22–12 (6–10 ACC)
- Head coach: Kenny Brooks (3rd season)
- Assistant coaches: Britney Anderson; Jennifer Brown; Shawn Poppie
- Home arena: Cassell Coliseum

2018–19 ACC women's basketball standings
	Conf.				Overall
Team	W		L	PCT	W		L	PCT
No. 3 Notre Dame†	14	–	2	.875	35	–	4	.897
No. 5 Louisville	14	–	2	.875	32	–	4	.889
No. 10 NC State	12	–	4	.750	28	–	6	.824
No. 19 Miami (FL)	12	–	4	.750	25	–	9	.735
No. 12 Syracuse	11	–	5	.688	25	–	9	.735
No. 25 Florida State	10	–	6	.625	24	–	9	.727
Clemson	9	–	7	.563	20	–	13	.606
North Carolina	8	–	8	.500	18	–	15	.545
Georgia Tech	7	–	9	.438	17	–	13	.567
Virginia Tech	6	–	10	.375	22	–	12	.647
Duke	6	–	10	.375	15	–	15	.500
Virginia	5	–	11	.313	12	–	19	.387
Boston College	3	–	13	.188	14	–	16	.467
Pittsburgh	2	–	14	.125	11	–	20	.355
Wake Forest	1	–	15	.063	10	–	20	.333
† 2019 ACC tournament winner As of March 7, 2019; Rankings from AP poll

The 2018–19 Virginia Tech Hokies women's basketball team represented Virginia Polytechnic Institute and State University during the 2018–19 NCAA Division I women's basketball season. The Hokies, led by third year head coach Kenny Brooks, played their home games at Cassell Coliseum as members of the Atlantic Coast Conference. They finished the season 22–12, 6–10 in ACC play to finish in a tie for tenth place. They advanced to the second round of the ACC women's tournament where they lost to Clemson. They received an automatic bid to the Women's National Invitation Tournament where they defeated Furman and VCU in the first and second rounds before losing to James Madison in the third round.

== Previous season ==
They finished the season 23–14, 6–10 in ACC play to finish in a tie for ninth place. They advanced to the quarterfinals of the ACC women's tournament where they lost to Louisville. They received an automatic bid to the Women's National Invitation Tournament where they defeated Navy, George Mason and Fordham in the first, second and third rounds respectively, Alabama in the quarterfinals, West Virginia in the semifinals to advanced to the championship game where they lost to Indiana.

== Off-season ==
=== Recruiting class ===
College recruiting information
Name	Hometown	School	Height	Weight	Commit date
Shaniya Jones; PG	High Point, North Carolina	Wesleyan Christian Academy	5 ft 6 in (1.68 m)	N/A	
Shaniya Jones; PG	Recruit ratings: ESPN: (94 PG #21)				
Dara Mabrey; PG	Belmar, New Jersey	Manasquan High School	5 ft 8 in (1.73 m)	N/A	
Dara Mabrey; PG	Recruit ratings: ESPN: (90 PG #27)				
Overall recruit ranking:
Note: In many cases, Scout, Rivals, 247Sports, On3, and ESPN may conflict in their listings of height and weight.; In these cases, the average was taken. ESPN grades are on a 100-point scale.; Sources:

== Roster ==
2017–18 Virginia Tech Hokies women's basketball team
Players
Coaches

Pos.	#	Name	Height	Year	Previous school	Hometown
F	0	Trinity Baptiste	6 ft 0 in (1.83 m)	So	Hillsborough; Northwest Florida St	Tampa, FL
G	1	Taylor Emery	5 ft 10 in (1.78 m)	Sr	Freedom; Gulf Coast State; Tulane	Tampa, FL
G	2	Aisha Sheppard	5 ft 9 in (1.75 m)	So	St. John's	Alexandria, VA
G	3	Chloe Brooks	5 ft 10 in (1.78 m)	Fr	Spotswood	Harrisonburg, VA
G	4	Dara Mabrey	5 ft 7 in (1.7 m)	Fr	Manasquan	Belmar, NJ
G	10	Kendyl Brooks	5 ft 10 in (1.78 m)	Jr	Spotswood	Harrisonburg, VA
F	11	Regan Magarity	6 ft 3 in (1.91 m)	RS Sr	Igelstavikens Gymnasium	Norrköping, Sweden
G	14	Kaela Kinder	5 ft 10 in (1.78 m)	Jr	Christ the King	Inwood, NY
F	20	Michelle Berry	6 ft 1 in (1.85 m)	RS Jr	Miami Country Day; Cal State Fullerton	Miami, FL
G	23	Rachel Camp	5 ft 10 in (1.78 m)	RS Sr	East Rutherford	Forest City, NC
F	25	Alexis Jean	6 ft 1 in (1.85 m)	Sr	Treasure Coast; Kennesaw State/Palm Beach State	Port St. Lucie, FL
F	34	Erinn Brooks	5 ft 10 in (1.78 m)	Sr	Franklin County	Union Hall, VA
C	40	Alex Obouh Fegue	6 ft 4 in (1.93 m)	RS So	Pierre de Coubertin (Calais, France); Eastern Florida	Chatearoux, France

Head coach

- Kenny Brooks (James Madison)

Assistant coach(es)

- Britney Anderson (Virginia Tech)
- Jennifer Brown (James Madison)
- Shawn Poppie (Limestone)

Legend

- (C) Team captain
- (S) Suspended
- (I) Ineligible
- (W) Walk-on
- Injured
- Current redshirt

Roster
Last update: November 1, 2018

Shaniya Jones transferred after appearing in 5 games for the Hokies.

== Schedule ==
Date time, TV	Rank^{#}	Opponent^{#}	Result	Record	High points	High rebounds	High assists	Site (attendance) city, state
Non-conference regular season
November 6, 2018*; 7:00 pm, ACCN Extra		USC Upstate	W 96–45	1–0	18 – 2 tied	15 – Magarity	5 – Mabrey	Cassell Coliseum (1,591); Blacksburg, VA
November 10, 2018*; 2:00 pm, ACCN Extra		Georgia Southern	W 78–49	2–0	18 – Magarity	12 – Baptiste	6 – Mabrey	Cassell Coliseum (1,252); Blacksburg, VA
November 13, 2018*; 6:00 pm, ESPN+		at Liberty	W 72–61	3–0	13 – 2 tied	15 – Magarity	6 – Camp	Vines Center (1,573); Lynchburg, VA
November 16, 2018*; 7:00 pm, ACCN Extra		Monmouth	W 82–49	4–0	26 – Mabrey	14 – Magarity	5 – Camp	Cassell Coliseum (1,233); Blacksburg, VA
November 19, 2018*; 7:00 pm, ACCN Extra		Chattanooga	W 74–59	5–0	20 – Emery	14 – Magarity	6 – Sheppard	Cassell Coliseum (955); Blacksburg, VA
November 24, 2018*; 12:00 pm		vs. Villanova; UCF Thanksgiving Classic	W 61–59	6–0	22 – Emery	16 – Magarity	2 – 3 tied	CFE Arena; Orlando, FL
November 25, 2018*; 11:00 am		vs. Richmond; UCF Thanksgiving Classic	W 85–57	7–0	24 – Baptiste	15 – Magarity	4 – Magarity	CFE Arena; Orlando, FL
November 28, 2018*; 7:00 pm, ACCN Extra		Rutgers; ACC–Big Ten Women's Challenge	W 67–51	8–0	22 – Emery	14 – Magarity	3 – Mabrey	Cassell Coliseum (966); Blacksburg, VA
December 4, 2018*; 7:00 pm, ACCN Extra		Radford; New River Valley rivalry	W 55–44	9–0	21 – Emery	16 – Magarity	2 – Magarity	Cassell Coliseum (1,763); Blacksburg, VA
December 16, 2018*; 2:00 pm, ACCN Extra		Mount St. Mary's	W 83–51	10–0	24 – Emery	10 – Magarity	4 – Mabrey	Cassell Coliseum (1,621); Blacksburg, VA
December 20, 2018*; 2:30 pm		vs. Dayton; West Palm Invitational	W 69–57	11–0	20 – Magarity	10 – Magarity	5 – Magarity	Student Life Center (200); West Palm Beach, FL
December 21, 2018*; 12:15 pm		vs. Ohio State; West Palm Invitational	W 81–73	12–0	27 – Emery	15 – Magarity	4 – Emery	Student Life Center (127); West Palm Beach, FL
December 29, 2018*; 2:00 pm, ACCN Extra		Longwood	W 93–39	13–0	22 – Baptiste	18 – Magarity	6 – Camp	Cassell Coliseum (1,389); Blacksburg, VA
ACC regular season
January 3, 2019; 2:00 pm, ACCN Extra		at Miami (FL)	L 61–68	13–1 (0–1)	20 – Emery	10 – Emery	3 – 2 Tied	Watsco Center (961); Coral Gables, FL
January 6, 2019; 2:00 pm, ACCN Extra		No. 14 Syracuse	L 73–75 ^{OT}	13–2 (0–2)	27 – Emery	10 – Magarity	5 – 2 Tied	Cassell Coliseum (2,287); Blacksburg, VA
January 10, 2019; 7:00 pm, ACCN Extra		at Virginia; Rivalry	L 58–62	13–3 (0–3)	26 – Emery	11 – Magarity	6 – Mabrey	John Paul Jones Arena (2,703); Charlottesville, VA
January 16, 2019; 7:00 pm, ACCN Extra		No. 1 Notre Dame	L 51–80	13–4 (0–4)	15 – Emery	16 – Baptiste	2 – Emery	Cassell Coliseum (2,131); Blacksburg, VA
January 20, 2019; 12:30 pm, RSN		at No. 8 NC State	L 61–70 ^{OT}	13–5 (0–5)	13 – Baptiste	5 – Baptiste	2 – 3 tied	Reynolds Coliseum (3,925); Raleigh, NC
January 24, 2019; 7:00 pm, ACCN Extra		North Carolina	L 69–81	13–6 (0–6)	19 – Mabrey	11 – Magarity	3 – 2 tied	Cassell Coliseum (1,450); Blacksburg, VA
January 27, 2019; 2:00 pm, ACCN Extra		No. 22 Florida State	L 54–56	13–7 (0–7)	16 – Baptiste	10 – Magarity	3 – K. Brooks	Cassell Coliseum (1,915); Blacksburg, VA
January 31, 2019; 7:00 pm, RSN		at Pittsburgh	W 74–58	14–7 (1–7)	24 – Emery	17 – Magarity	7 – Magarity	Petersen Events Center (588); Pittsburgh, PA
February 3, 2019; 1:00 pm, ACCN Extra		at Boston College	W 95–86	15–7 (2–7)	30 – Magarity	14 – Magarity	6 – Mabrey	Conte Forum (1,590); Chestnut Hill, MA
February 10, 2019; 12:00 pm, RSN		No. 2 Louisville	L 63–72	15–8 (2–8)	17 – Mabrey	8 – 2 tied	3 – Emery	Cassell Coliseum (2,006); Blacksburg, VA
February 14, 2019; 7:00 pm, RSN		at Duke	W 64–57	16–8 (3–8)	22 – Magarity	18 – Magarity	3 – 2 tied	Cameron Indoor Stadium (3,117); Durham, NC
February 17, 2019; 1:00 pm, RSN		at Georgia Tech	L 68–76	16–9 (3–9)	27 – Emery	14 – Magarity	6 – Mabrey	McCamish Pavilion (1,445); Atlanta, GA
February 21, 2019; 7:00 pm, ACCN Extra		No. 14 Miami (FL)	W 73–65	17–9 (4–9)	24 – Emery	19 – Magarity	5 – Mabrey	Cassell Coliseum (2,213); Blacksburg, VA
February 24, 2019; 1:00 pm, RSN		at Clemson	L 66–73	17–10 (4–10)	17 – Magarity	9 – Magarity	6 – Mabrey	Littlejohn Coliseum (1,264); Clemson, SC
February 28, 2019; 7:00 pm, ACCN Extra		Virginia; Rivalry	W 63–45	18–10 (5–10)	19 – Emery	17 – Magarity	6 – Emery	Cassell Coliseum (2,287); Blacksburg, VA
March 3, 2019; 2:00 pm, ACCN Extra		Wake Forest	W 69–57	19–10 (6–10)	20 – Emery	15 – Magarity	3 – 4 Tied	Cassell Coliseum (2,418); Blacksburg, VA
ACC Women's Tournament
March 6, 2019; 3:30 pm, RSN	(10)	vs. (15) Wake Forest; First Round	W 85–63	20–10	26 – Emery	15 – Baptiste	5 – Mabrey	Greensboro Coliseum; Greensboro, NC
March 7, 2019; 6:00 pm, RSN	(10)	vs. (7) Clemson; Second Round	L 79–80 ^{OT}	20–11	35 – Emery	10 – Magarity	3 – Magarity	Greensboro Coliseum; Greensboro, NC
WNIT
March 21, 2019*; 7:00 pm		Furman; First Round	W 92–65	21–11	23 – Emery	15 – Magarity	5 – Baptise	Cassell Coliseum (681); Blacksburg, VA
March 24, 2019*; 2:00 pm		VCU; Second Round	W 82–72	22–11	21 – Emery	12 – Magarity	3 – Baptiste	Cassell Coliseum (781); Blacksburg, VA
March 28, 2019*; 7:00 pm		James Madison; Third Round	L 66–70	22–12	21 – Emery	12 – Baptiste	4 – Emery	JMU Convocation Center (2,872); Harrisonburg, VA
*Non-conference game. ^{#}Rankings from AP Poll. (#) Tournament seedings in parentheses. All times are in Eastern.

== Player statistics ==
Legend
GP	Games played	GS	Games started	MPG	Minutes per game
FG%	Field-goal percentage	3P%	3-point field-goal percentage	FT%	Free-throw percentage
RPG	Rebounds per game	APG	Assists per game	SPG	Steals per game
BPG	Blocks per game	PPG	Points per game

No.	Player	GP	GS	MPG	FG%	FT%	3FG%	STL	BLK	AST	REB	PTS
0	Trinity Baptiste	29	14	27.10	46.95	85.71	60.00	0.79	0.8	1.28	7.10	9.79
1	Taylor Emery	29	29	34.38	45.52	84.87	38.41	0.83	0.24	2.10	5.52	17.93
2	Aisha Sheppard	29	6	22.45	38.37	79.41	35.88	0.62	0.24	1.45	1.76	6.62
4	Dara Mabrey	29	29	27.90	45.97	86.00	47.68	0.66	0.10	2.83	1.79	11.83
5	Shaniya Jones	5	0	10.2	35.7	66.67	50.00	0.60	0.20	1.40	1.00	2.60
10	Kendyl Brooks	29	19	24.17	26.95	70.00	28.91	0.55	0.24	0.86	2.07	4.14
11	Regan Magarity	29	29	35.45	51.84	73.40	30.88	1.07	1.79	2.28	12.90	14.41
23	Rachel Camp	28	15	19.46	35.85	68.57	22.73	0.39	0.25	1.46	2.82	3.75
25	Alexis Jean	16	3	12.44	30.95	50.00	32.14	0.25	0.06	0.13	1.88	2.31
34	Erinn Brooks	19	0	4.79	75.00	N/A	N/A	0.11	0.00	0.21	0.53	0.63

== Rankings ==
2018–19 NCAA Division I women's basketball rankings

Regular season polls
Poll	Pre- Season	Week 2	Week 3	Week 4	Week 5	Week 6	Week 7	Week 8	Week 9	Week 10	Week 11	Week 12	Week 13	Week 14	Week 15	Week 16	Week 17	Week 18	Week 19	Final
AP	RV	RV	RV	RV	RV	RV	RV	RV	RV	RV										N/A
Coaches		RV	RV	RV	RV	RV	RV	RV	25	RV	RV									

Legend
	Increase in ranking
	Decrease in ranking
	Not Ranked in Previous Week
(RV)	Received Votes
(NR)	Not Ranked

== See also ==
- 2018–19 Virginia Tech Hokies men's basketball team
