= 2018–19 Miami Hurricanes women's basketball team =

Intercollegiate basketball season

2018–19 Miami Hurricanes women's basketball

NCAA tournament, second round
- Conference: Atlantic Coast Conference

Ranking
- Coaches: No. 20
- AP: No. 19
- Record: 25–9 (12–4 ACC)
- Head coach: Katie Meier (14th season)
- Assistant coaches: Octavia Blue; Tia Jackson; Fitzroy Anthony
- Home arena: Watsco Center

2018–19 ACC women's basketball standings
| | Conf. | | | | Overall |
| Team | W | | L | PCT | W | | L | PCT |
|---|---|---|---|---|---|---|---|---|
| No. 3 Notre Dame† | 14 | – | 2 | .875 | 35 | – | 4 | .897 |
| No. 5 Louisville | 14 | – | 2 | .875 | 32 | – | 4 | .889 |
| No. 10 NC State | 12 | – | 4 | .750 | 28 | – | 6 | .824 |
| No. 19 Miami (FL) | 12 | – | 4 | .750 | 25 | – | 9 | .735 |
| No. 12 Syracuse | 11 | – | 5 | .688 | 25 | – | 9 | .735 |
| No. 25 Florida State | 10 | – | 6 | .625 | 24 | – | 9 | .727 |
| Clemson | 9 | – | 7 | .563 | 20 | – | 13 | .606 |
| North Carolina | 8 | – | 8 | .500 | 18 | – | 15 | .545 |
| Georgia Tech | 7 | – | 9 | .438 | 17 | – | 13 | .567 |
| Virginia Tech | 6 | – | 10 | .375 | 22 | – | 12 | .647 |
| Duke | 6 | – | 10 | .375 | 15 | – | 15 | .500 |
| Virginia | 5 | – | 11 | .313 | 12 | – | 19 | .387 |
| Boston College | 3 | – | 13 | .188 | 14 | – | 16 | .467 |
| Pittsburgh | 2 | – | 14 | .125 | 11 | – | 20 | .355 |
| Wake Forest | 1 | – | 15 | .063 | 10 | – | 20 | .333 |
† 2019 ACC tournament winner As of March 7, 2019; Rankings from AP poll

The 2018–19 Miami hurricanes women's basketball team represented the University of Miami during the 2018–19 NCAA Division I women's basketball season. The Hurricanes, led by fourteenth-year head coach Katie Meier, played their home games at the Watsco Center in Miami, Florida and were members of the Atlantic Coast Conference (ACC). They finished the season 25–9, 10–6 in ACC play, to finish in a tie for third place. They lost in the quarterfinals of the ACC women's tournament to Syracuse. They received an at-large bid to the NCAA women's tournament, where they defeated Florida Gulf Coast in the first round before losing to Arizona State in the second round.

== Previous season ==
For the 2017–18 season, the Hurricanes finished 21–11 overall and 10–6 in ACC play to finish in a three-way tie for sixth place. They were eliminated in the quarterfinals of the ACC tournament by Florida State. The Hurricanes received an at-large bid to the NCAA tournament as an eight-seed, their fourth consecutive tournament appearance, and were upset in the first round of the tournament by Quinnipiac.

== Off-season ==
=== Recruiting class ===
College recruiting
| Name | Hometown | School | Height | Weight | Commit date |
|---|---|---|---|---|---|
| Jamir Huston; F | Dayton, OH | Shaker Heights High School | 5 ft 10 in (1.78 m) | N/A | |
| Jamir Huston; F | Recruit ratings: ESPN: (90) | | | | |
Overall recruit ranking:
Note: In many cases, Scout, Rivals, 247Sports, On3, and ESPN may conflict in their listings of height and weight.; In these cases, the average was taken. ESPN grades are on a 100-point scale.; Sources:

== Roster ==
2018–19 Miami Hurricanes women's basketball team
Players
Coaches

| Pos. | # | Name | Height | Year | Previous school | Hometown |
|---|---|---|---|---|---|---|
| G | 1 | Laura Cornelius | 5 ft 8 in (1.73 m) | RS Jr | Caland Lyceum | Groningen, Netherlands |
| G | 3 | Endia Banks | 5 ft 9 in (1.75 m) | So | Duluth | Duluth, GA |
| G | 5 | Mykea Gray | 5 ft 4 in (1.63 m) | RS So | National Christian Academy | Atlanta, GA |
| G/F | 12 | Sarah Mortensen | 6 ft 1 in (1.85 m) | Jr | Long Island Lutheran | Copenhagen, Denmark |
| G | 13 | Taylor Mason | 5 ft 9 in (1.75 m) | So | Norcross | Decatur, GA |
| F | 15 | Jamir Huston | 5 ft 10 in (1.78 m) | Fr | Shaker Heights | Dayton, OH |
| G | 20 | Kelsey Marshall | 5 ft 9 in (1.75 m) | So | Miami Country Day School | Davie, FL |
| F/C | 21 | Emese Hof | 6 ft 3 in (1.91 m) | Sr | Caland Lyceum | Utrecht, Netherlands |
| G/F | 23 | Rebecca Ripley | 6 ft 0 in (1.83 m) | RS Fr | New Hampton School | Stratham, NH |
| F | 25 | Khaila Prather | 6 ft 1 in (1.85 m) | RS Sr | Riverdale Baptist | Upper Marlboro, MD |
| F | 32 | Beatrice Mompremier | 6 ft 4 in (1.93 m) | RS Jr | Miami Senior; Baylor | Miami, FL |
| F | 33 | Destiny Harden | 6 ft 0 in (1.83 m) | So | Morgan Park; West Virginia | Chicago, IL |

Head coach

- Katie Meier (Duke)

Assistant coach(es)

- Octavia Blue (Miami (FL))
- Tia Jackson (Iowa)
- Fitzroy Anthony (Palm Beach Atlantic)

Legend

- (C) Team captain
- (S) Suspended
- (I) Ineligible
- (W) Walk-on
- Injured
- Current redshirt

Roster
Last update: October 31, 2024

== Schedule ==
| Date time, TV | Rank^{#} | Opponent^{#} | Result | Record | Site (attendance) city, state |
Exhibition
| October 29, 2018*; 7:00 p.m. | No. 25 | Nova Southeastern | W 91–67 | – | Watsco Center (665); Coral Gables, FL |
Non-conference regular season
| November 6, 2018*; 7:00 p.m., ESPN+ | No. 25 | at FIU | W 94–43 | 1–0 | Ocean Bank Convocation Center (687); University Park, FL |
| November 9, 2018*; 11:00 a.m., ACCN Extra | No. 25 | Stephen F. Austin; Preseason WNIT first round | W 81–60 | 2–0 | Watsco Center (3,079); Coral Gables, FL |
| November 11, 2018*; 1:00 p.m., ACCN Extra | No. 25 | Hartford; Preseason WNIT quarterfinals | W 75–62 | 3–0 | Watsco Center (783); Coral Gables, FL |
| November 15, 2018*; 7:00 p.m., ACCN Extra | No. 24 | No. 19 Marquette; Preseason WNIT Semifinals | W 63–55 | 4–0 | Watsco Center (855); Coral Gables, FL |
| November 18, 2018*; 4:30 p.m., CBSSN | No. 24 | at Iowa State; Preseason WNIT championship | L 52–75 | 4–1 | Hilton Coliseum (10,064); Ames, IA |
| November 23, 2018*; 3:00 p.m., ACCN Extra | No. 24 | Nebraska; Miami Thanksgiving Classic | W 82–68 | 5–1 | Watsco Center (730); Coral Gables, FL |
| November 25, 2018*; 2:00 p.m., ACCN Extra | No. 24 | Temple; Miami Thanksgiving Classic | W 73–61 | 6–1 | Watsco Center (718); Coral Gables, FL |
| November 29, 2018*; 7:00 p.m., BTN Plus | No. 21 | at Purdue; ACC–Big Ten Women's Challenge | L 63–74 | 6–2 | Mackey Arena (5,831); West Lafayette, IN |
| December 2, 2018*; 1:00 p.m., ACCN Extra | No. 21 | Colorado | W 73–58 | 7–2 | Watsco Center (896); Coral Gables, FL |
| December 9, 2018*; 1:00 p.m., ACCN Extra | No. 25 | New Orleans | W 78–38 | 8–2 | Watsco Center (766); Coral Gables, FL |
| December 16, 2018*; 1:00 p.m., ACCN Extra | No. 24 | Maryland Eastern Shore | W 71–53 | 9–2 | Watsco Center (1,069); Coral Gables, FL |
| December 20, 2018*; 8:30 p.m., FloHoops | No. 24 | vs. Vanderbilt; Florida Sunshine Classic | W 90–65 | 10–2 | Warden Arena (397); Winter Garden, FL |
| December 21, 2018*; 6:15 p.m., FloHoops | No. 24 | vs. Alabama; Florida Sunshine Classic | W 101–74 | 11–2 | Warden Arena (472); Winter Garden, FL |
| December 28, 2018*; 7:00 p.m., ACCN Extra | No. 24 | Florida A&M; Miami Holiday Classic | W 103–54 | 12–2 | Watsco Center (979); Coral Gables, FL |
| December 30, 2018*; 4:00 p.m., ACCN Extra | No. 24 | Central Michigan; Miami Holiday Classic | L 80–90 | 12–3 | Watsco Center (727); Coral Gables, FL |
ACC regular season
| January 3, 2019; 2:00 p.m., ACCN Extra | | Virginia Tech | W 68–61 | 13–3 (1–0) | Watsco Center (961); Coral Gables, FL |
| January 6, 2019; 1:00 p.m., ACCN Extra | | at Wake Forest | W 72–57 | 14–3 (2–0) | LJVM Coliseum (704); Winston-Salem, NC |
| January 10, 2019; 11:00 a.m., ACCN Extra | | Clemson | L 67–76 | 14–4 (2–1) | Watsco Center (2,490); Coral Gables, FL |
| January 17, 2019; 7:00 p.m., ACCN Extra | | at Duke | W 58–50 | 15–4 (3–1) | Cameron Indoor Stadium (3,664); Durham, NC |
| January 20, 2019; 2:30 p.m., RSN | | North Carolina | W 76–68 | 16–4 (4–1) | Watsco Center (1,560); Coral Gables, FL |
| January 23, 2019; 7:00 p.m., ACCN Extra | | at No. 13 Syracuse | W 84–71 | 17–4 (5–1) | Carrier Dome (1,332); Syracuse, NY |
| January 27, 2019; 1:00 p.m., ACCN Extra | | Boston College | W 76–73 | 18–4 (6–1) | Watsco Center (1,108); Coral Gables, FL |
| January 31, 2019; 7:00 p.m., ACCN Extra | | at No. 24 Florida State; Rivalry | L 58–62 | 18–5 (6–2) | Donald L. Tucker Center (3,570); Tallahassee, FL |
| February 3, 2019; 1:00 p.m., ACCN Extra | | Virginia | W 72–59 | 19–5 (7–2) | Watsco Center (1,059); Coral Gables, FL |
| February 7, 2019; 7:00 p.m., ACCN Extra | No. 25 | No. 4 Notre Dame | W 72–65 | 20–5 (8–2) | Watsco Center (1,864); Coral Gables, FL |
| February 10, 2019; 2:00 p.m., ACCN Extra | No. 25 | at Pittsburgh | W 65–51 | 21–5 (9–2) | Petersen Events Center (2,495); Pittsburgh, PA |
| February 17, 2019; 3:00 p.m., ESPN2 | No. 20 | at No. 2 Louisville | W 79–73 | 22–5 (10–2) | KFC Yum! Center (12,193); Louisville, KY |
| February 21, 2019; 7:00 p.m., ACCN Extra | No. 14 | at Virginia Tech | L 65–73 | 22–6 (10–3) | Cassell Coliseum (2,213); Blacksburg, VA |
| February 24, 2019; 12:00 p.m., ESPN2 | No. 14 | No. 22 Florida State; Rivalry | W 64–54 | 23–6 (11–3) | Watsco Center (2,339); Coral Gables, FL |
| February 28, 2019; 7:00 p.m., RSN | No. 15 | Georgia Tech | W 69–56 | 24–6 (12–3) | Watsco Center (1,151); Coral Gables, FL |
| March 3, 2019; 2:30 p.m., RSN | No. 15 | at No. 10 NC State | L 68–70 | 24–7 (12–4) | Reynolds Coliseum (5,500); Raleigh, NC |
ACC women's tournament
| March 8, 2019; 12:00 p.m., RSN | (4) No. 16 | vs. (5) No. 18 Syracuse; Quarterfinals | L 85–92 | 24–8 | Greensboro Coliseum (8,121); Greensboro, NC |
NCAA women's tournament
| March 22, 2019*; 9:00 p.m., ESPN2 | (4 P) No. 19 | (13 P) Florida Gulf Coast; First round | W 69–62 | 25–8 | Watsco Center (3,003); Coral Gables, FL |
| March 24, 2019*; 7:00 p.m., ESPN2 | (4 P) No. 19 | (5 P) No. 22 Arizona State; Second round | L 55–57 | 25–9 | Watsco Center (2,056); Coral Gables, FL |
*Non-conference game. ^{#}Rankings from AP poll. (#) Tournament seedings in parentheses. P=Portland. All times are in Eastern.

== Rankings ==
Regular-season polls
| Poll | Pre- season | Week 2 | Week 3 | Week 4 | Week 5 | Week 6 | Week 7 | Week 8 | Week 9 | Week 10 | Week 11 | Week 12 | Week 13 | Week 14 | Week 15 | Week 16 | Week 17 | Week 18 | Week 19 | Final |
|---|---|---|---|---|---|---|---|---|---|---|---|---|---|---|---|---|---|---|---|---|
| AP | 25 | 24 | 24 | 21 | 25 | 24 | 24 | 24 | RV | RV | | RV | RV | 25 | 20 | 14 | 15 | 16 | 19 | N/A |
| Coaches | 24 | 22 | 20 | 20 | 23 | 22-T | 23 | 23 | RV | | RV | | 23 | 25 | 20 | 14 | 15-T | 15 | 16 | 20 |

Legend
| | Increase in ranking |
| | Decrease in ranking |
| | Not ranked previous week |
| (RV) | Received votes |

The Coaches Poll released a final poll after the NCAA tournament, but the AP poll did not release a poll at that time.
