= 2018–19 NC State Wolfpack women's basketball team =

Intercollegiate basketball season

2018–19 NC State Wolfpack women's basketball

NCAA tournament, Sweet Sixteen
- Conference: Atlantic Coast Conference

Ranking
- Coaches: No. 9
- AP: No. 10
- Record: 28–6 (12–4 ACC)
- Head coach: Wes Moore (6th season)
- Assistant coaches: Lindsay Edmonds; Simon Harris; Erin Batth
- Home arena: Reynolds Coliseum

2018–19 ACC women's basketball standings
	Conf.				Overall
Team	W		L	PCT	W		L	PCT
No. 3 Notre Dame†	14	–	2	.875	35	–	4	.897
No. 5 Louisville	14	–	2	.875	32	–	4	.889
No. 10 NC State	12	–	4	.750	28	–	6	.824
No. 19 Miami (FL)	12	–	4	.750	25	–	9	.735
No. 12 Syracuse	11	–	5	.688	25	–	9	.735
No. 25 Florida State	10	–	6	.625	24	–	9	.727
Clemson	9	–	7	.563	20	–	13	.606
North Carolina	8	–	8	.500	18	–	15	.545
Georgia Tech	7	–	9	.438	17	–	13	.567
Virginia Tech	6	–	10	.375	22	–	12	.647
Duke	6	–	10	.375	15	–	15	.500
Virginia	5	–	11	.313	12	–	19	.387
Boston College	3	–	13	.188	14	–	16	.467
Pittsburgh	2	–	14	.125	11	–	20	.355
Wake Forest	1	–	15	.063	10	–	20	.333
† 2019 ACC tournament winner As of March 7, 2019; Rankings from AP poll

The 2018–19 NC State Wolfpack women's basketball team represented North Carolina State University during the 2018–19 NCAA Division I women's basketball season. The Wolfpack, led by sixth-year head coach Wes Moore, played their home games at Reynolds Coliseum and were members of the Atlantic Coast Conference. They finished the season 28–6, 11–5 in ACC play to finish in a tie for third place. They advanced to the semifinals of the ACC women's tournament, where they lost to Louisville. They received an at-large bid to the NCAA women's tournament, where they defeated Maine and Kentucky in the first and second rounds to advance to the sweet sixteen for the second straight year, where they lost to Iowa.

== Previous season ==
They finished the 2017–18 season 26–9, 11–5 in ACC play to finish in a tie for fourth place. They advanced to the semifinals of the ACC women's tournament, where they lost to Louisville. They received an at-large bid to the NCAA women's tournament, where they defeated Elon and Maryland in the first and second rounds before losing to Mississippi State in the sweet sixteen.

== Off-season ==
=== Recruiting class ===
College recruiting
Name	Hometown	School	Height	Weight	Commit date
Elissa Cunane; C	Summerfield, North Carolina	Northern Guilford High School	6 ft 5 in (1.96 m)	N/A	
Elissa Cunane; C	Recruit ratings: ESPN: (95)				
Jada Rice; F	Suwanee, Georgia	Collins Hill High School	6 ft 2 in (1.88 m)	N/A	
Jada Rice; F	Recruit ratings: ESPN: (90)				
Overall recruit ranking:
Note: In many cases, Scout, Rivals, 247Sports, On3, and ESPN may conflict in their listings of height and weight.; In these cases, the average was taken. ESPN grades are on a 100-point scale.; Sources:

== Roster ==
2018–19 NC State Wolfpack women's basketball team
Players
Coaches

Pos.	#	Name	Height	Year	Previous school	Hometown
G	1	Aislinn Konig	5 ft 9 in (1.75 m)	Jr	Brookswood Secondary	Surrey, BC
G	2	Kaila Ealey	5 ft 9 in (1.75 m)	GS	Needham Broughton	Raleigh, NC
G	3	Kai Crutchfield	5 ft 8 in (1.73 m)	So	Millbrook	Raleigh, NC
G	11	Kiara Leslie	6 ft 0 in (1.83 m)	GS	Holly Springs	Holly Springs, NC
F	13	Esra McGoldrick	6 ft 2 in (1.88 m)	Fr	Rangi Ruru Girls' School	Christchurch, New Zealand
F	21	DD Rodgers	6 ft 1 in (1.85 m)	Sr	Myers Park	Charlotte, NC
G	23	Grace Hunter	5 ft 9 in (1.75 m)	RS Jr	Athens Drive	Raleigh, NC
F	24	Erika Cassell	6 ft 2 in (1.88 m)	Jr	Holy Innocents	Marietta, GA
F	25	Kayla Jones	6 ft 1 in (1.85 m)	So	Riverside	Jamesville, NC
F	31	Jada Rice	6 ft 1 in (1.85 m)	Fr	Collins Hill	Suwanee, GA
C	33	Elissa Cunane	6 ft 5 in (1.96 m)	Fr	Northern Guilford	Summerfield, NC
G	40	Katie Wadsworth	5 ft 6 in (1.68 m)	Jr	Needham Broughton	Raleigh, NC
G	50	Armani Hawkins	5 ft 10 in (1.78 m)	RS Sr	Mountain View	Mesa, AZ

Head coach

- Wes Moore (NC State)

Assistant coach(es)

- Lindsay Edmonds (Appalachian State)
- Simon Harris (NC State)
- Erin Batth (Clemson)

Legend

- (C) Team captain
- (S) Suspended
- (I) Ineligible
- (W) Walk-on
- Injured
- Current redshirt

Roster
Last update: October 25, 2018

== Schedule ==
Date time, TV	Rank^{#}	Opponent^{#}	Result	Record	Site (attendance) city, state
Exhibition
November 1, 2018*; 7:00 pm, ACCN Extra	No. 17	Anderson	W 83–57	–	Reynolds Coliseum (828); Raleigh, NC
Non-conference regular season
November 7, 2018*; 7:00 pm, ACCN Extra	No. 17	Belmont	W 77–62	1–0	Reynolds Coliseum (1,945); Raleigh, NC
November 11, 2018*; 2:00 pm, ACCN Extra	No. 17	Kent State	W 78–61	2–0	Reynolds Coliseum (2,126); Raleigh, NC
November 15, 2018*; 7:00 pm, ACCN Extra	No. 17	Vanderbilt	W 74–54	3–0	Reynolds Coliseum (2,372); Raleigh, NC
November 18, 2018*; 2:00 pm, ACCN Extra	No. 17	Radford	W 75–58	4–0	Reynolds Coliseum (2,405); Raleigh, NC
November 22, 2018*; 6:30 pm	No. 15	vs. Michigan State; Cancún Challenge Riviera Division	W 78–74	5–0	Hard Rock Hotel Riviera Maya (300); Cancún, Mexico
November 23, 2018*; 4:00 pm	No. 15	vs. George Washington; Cancún Challenge Riviera Division	W 69–61	6–0	Hard Rock Hotel Riviera Maya (300); Cancún, Mexico
November 29, 2018*; 7:00 pm, ACCN Extra	No. 13	Michigan; ACC–Big Ten Women's Challenge	W 66–55	7–0	Reynolds Coliseum (2,782); Raleigh, NC
December 2, 2018*; 2:00 pm, ACCN Extra	No. 13	Old Dominion	W 85–56	8–0	Reynolds Coliseum (2,720); Raleigh, NC
December 5, 2018*; 10:30 am, ACCN Extra	No. 10	Hampton	W 83–51	9–0	Reynolds Coliseum (3,955); Raleigh, NC
December 8, 2018*; 1:00 pm	No. 10	at Georgetown	W 76–65	10–0	McDonough Gymnasium (671); Washington, D.C.
December 15, 2018*; 6:00 pm, ACCN Extra	No. 10	Maine	W 84–56	11–0	Reynolds Coliseum (2,755); Raleigh, NC
December 21, 2018*; 7:00 pm, ESPN+	No. 10	at Chattanooga	W 78–58	12–0	McKenzie Arena (1,714); Chattanooga, TN
December 30, 2018*; 2:00 pm, ACCN Extra	No. 9	Davidson	W 75–45	13–0	Reynolds Coliseum (3,050); Raleigh, NC
ACC regular season
January 3, 2019; 7:00 pm, RSN	No. 9	Duke	W 63–51	14–0 (1–0)	Reynolds Coliseum (2,971); Raleigh, NC
January 6, 2019; 2:00 pm, ACCN Extra	No. 9	at Boston College	W 85–69	15–0 (2–0)	Conte Forum (1,475); Chestnut Hill, MA
January 10, 2019; 7:00 pm, ACCN Extra	No. 8	Pittsburgh	W 63–34	16–0 (3–0)	Reynolds Coliseum (2,658); Raleigh, NC
January 13, 2019; 2:00 pm, ACCN Extra	No. 8	at Virginia	W 66–38	17–0 (4–0)	John Paul Jones Arena (2,530); Charlottesville, VA
January 20, 2019; 12:30 pm, RSN	No. 8	Virginia Tech	W 70–61 ^{OT}	18–0 (5–0)	Reynolds Coliseum (3,925); Raleigh, NC
January 24, 2019; 7:00 pm, ACCN Extra	No. 8	Clemson	W 54–51	19–0 (6–0)	Reynolds Coliseum (2,783); Raleigh, NC
January 27, 2019; 2:00 pm, ACCN Extra	No. 8	at Georgia Tech	W 68–60	20–0 (7–0)	McCamish Pavilion (2,014); Atlanta, GA
January 31, 2019; 7:00 pm, ACCN Extra	No. 7	at Wake Forest	W 59–50	21–0 (8–0)	LJVM Coliseum (1,457); Winston-Salem, NC
February 3, 2019; 2:00 pm, ACCN Extra	No. 7	North Carolina; Rivalry	L 51–64	21–1 (8–1)	Reynolds Coliseum (5,500); Raleigh, NC
February 7, 2019; 7:00 pm, ACCN Extra	No. 9	at No. 24 Florida State	L 70–75	21–2 (8–2)	Donald L. Tucker Center (2,734); Tallahassee, FL
February 13, 2019; 7:00 pm, ACCN Extra	No. 12	at No. 16 Syracuse	W 77–73	22–2 (9–2)	Carrier Dome; Syracuse, NY
February 18, 2019; 7:00 pm, ESPN2	No. 9	No. 5 Notre Dame	L 72–95	22–3 (9–3)	Reynolds Coliseum (5,500); Raleigh, NC
February 21, 2019; 7:00 pm, RSN	No. 9	Wake Forest	W 80–46	23–3 (10–3)	Reynolds Coliseum (2,564); Raleigh, NC
February 24, 2019; 12:00 pm, ESPNU	No. 9	at North Carolina; Rivalry	W 74–69	24–3 (11–3)	Carmichael Arena (4,863); Chapel Hill, NC
February 28, 2019; 7:00 pm, ACCN Extra	No. 10	at No. 3 Louisville	L 62–92	24–4 (11–4)	KFC Yum! Center (10,602); Louisville, KY
March 3, 2019; 2:30 pm, RSN	No. 10	No. 15 Miami (FL)	W 70–68	25–4 (12–4)	Reynolds Coliseum (5,500); Raleigh, NC
ACC Women's Tournament
March 8, 2019; 9:00 pm, RSN	(3) No. 9	vs. (6) No. 22 Florida State; Quarterfinals	W 69–62	26–4	Greensboro Coliseum (5,646); Greensboro, NC
March 9, 2019; 2:30 pm, ESPNU	(3) No. 9	vs. (2) No. 3 Louisville; Semifinals	L 68–78	26–5	Greensboro Coliseum (6,943); Greensboro, NC
NCAA Women's Tournament
March 23, 2019*; 1:00 pm, ESPN2	(3 G) No. 10	(14 G) Maine; First Round	W 63–51	27–5	Reynolds Coliseum (2,769); Raleigh, NC
March 25, 2019*; 7:00 pm, ESPN	(3 G) No. 10	(6 G) No. 17 Kentucky; Second Round	W 72–57	28–5	Reynolds Coliseum (2,683); Raleigh, NC
March 30, 2019*; 11:30 am, ESPN	(3 G) No. 10	vs. (2 G) No. 8 Iowa; Sweet Sixteen	L 61–79	28–6	Greensboro Coliseum; Greensboro, NC
*Non-conference game. ^{#}Rankings from AP Poll. (#) Tournament seedings in parentheses. G=Greensboro. All times are in Eastern.

== Rankings ==
Regular season polls
Poll	Pre- season	Week 2	Week 3	Week 4	Week 5	Week 6	Week 7	Week 8	Week 9	Week 10	Week 11	Week 12	Week 13	Week 14	Week 15	Week 16	Week 17	Week 18	Week 19	Final
AP	17	17	15	13	10	10	10	9	9	8	8	8	7	9	12	9	10	9	10	N/A
Coaches	16	13	13	13	10	10	10	9	9	8	8	8	7	9	11	12	10	11	10	9

Legend
	Increase in ranking
	Decrease in ranking
	Not ranked previous week
(RV)	Received votes

The Coaches Poll releases a final poll after the NCAA tournament, but the AP Poll does not release a poll at this time.
