= 2018–19 Florida State Seminoles women's basketball team =

Intercollegiate basketball season

2018–19 Florida State Seminoles women's basketball

Junkanoo Jam Bimini Division Champions

NCAA tournament, round of 32
- Conference: Atlantic Coast Conference

Ranking
- Coaches: No. 23
- AP: No. 25
- Record: 24–9 (10–6 ACC)
- Head coach: Sue Semrau (22nd season)
- Assistant coaches: Brooke Wyckoff; Joy McCorvey; JC Carter
- Home arena: Donald L. Tucker Center (Capacity: 12,100)

2018–19 ACC women's basketball standings
	Conf.				Overall
Team	W		L	PCT	W		L	PCT
No. 3 Notre Dame†	14	–	2	.875	35	–	4	.897
No. 5 Louisville	14	–	2	.875	32	–	4	.889
No. 10 NC State	12	–	4	.750	28	–	6	.824
No. 19 Miami (FL)	12	–	4	.750	25	–	9	.735
No. 12 Syracuse	11	–	5	.688	25	–	9	.735
No. 25 Florida State	10	–	6	.625	24	–	9	.727
Clemson	9	–	7	.563	20	–	13	.606
North Carolina	8	–	8	.500	18	–	15	.545
Georgia Tech	7	–	9	.438	17	–	13	.567
Virginia Tech	6	–	10	.375	22	–	12	.647
Duke	6	–	10	.375	15	–	15	.500
Virginia	5	–	11	.313	12	–	19	.387
Boston College	3	–	13	.188	14	–	16	.467
Pittsburgh	2	–	14	.125	11	–	20	.355
Wake Forest	1	–	15	.063	10	–	20	.333
† 2019 ACC tournament winner As of March 7, 2019; Rankings from AP poll

The 2018–19 Florida State Seminoles women's basketball team, variously Florida State or FSU, represents Florida State University during the 2018–19 NCAA Division I women's basketball season. Florida State competes in Division I of the National Collegiate Athletic Association (NCAA). The Seminoles are led by head coach Sue Semrau, in her twenty-second year, and play their home games at the Donald L. Tucker Center on the university's Tallahassee, Florida campus. They are members of the Atlantic Coast Conference.

The Seminoles finished the season with a record of 24–9, going 10–6 in ACC play to finish in sixth place. Florida State reached the quarterfinals of the ACC tournament. The Seminoles received an at-large bid to the NCAA tournament as a fifth-seed, their seventh consecutive tournament appearance, where they reached the second round.

== Previous season ==
For the 2017–18 season, the Seminoles finished with a record of 26–7, 12–4 in the ACC, to finish in third place. Florida State was eliminated in the quarterfinals of the ACC tournament by Notre Dame. The Seminoles received an at-large bid to the NCAA tournament as a three-seed, their sixth consecutive tournament appearance, and were upset in the second round of the tournament by Buffalo.

== Off-season ==
=== Recruiting class ===
College recruiting
Name	Hometown	School	Height	Weight	Commit date
Izabela Nicoletti; G	São Paulo, Brazil	Neuse Christian Academy	5 ft 10 in (1.78 m)	N/A	
Izabela Nicoletti; G	Recruit ratings: ESPN: (98)				
Kourtney Weber; G	New Orleans, LA	Ursuline Academy	2 ft 10 in (0.86 m)	N/A	
Kourtney Weber; G	Recruit ratings: ESPN: (96)				
Valencia Myers; F	Solon, OH	Solon High School	6 ft 3 in (1.91 m)	N/A	
Valencia Myers; F	Recruit ratings: ESPN: (95)				
Morgan Jones; G	Jonesboro, GA	Our Lady of Mercy	6 ft 2 in (1.88 m)	N/A	
Morgan Jones; G	Recruit ratings: ESPN: (95)				
Amaya Brown; G	Albuquerque, NM	Cibola	5 ft 11 in (1.80 m)	N/A	
Amaya Brown; G	Recruit ratings: ESPN: (91)				
Overall recruit ranking:
Note: In many cases, Scout, Rivals, 247Sports, On3, and ESPN may conflict in their listings of height and weight.; In these cases, the average was taken. ESPN grades are on a 100-point scale.; Sources:

== Roster ==
2018–19 Florida State Seminoles women's basketball team
Players
Coaches

Pos.	#	Name	Height	Year	Hometown
G	3	Sayawni Lassiter	5 ft 10 in (1.78 m)	RS Fr	Dorchester, MA
G	4	Amaya Brown	5 ft 11 in (1.8 m)	Fr	Albuquerque, NM
G	10	Kourtney Webber	5 ft 10 in (1.78 m)	Fr	New Orleans, LA
F	11	Iho López	6 ft 2 in (1.88 m)	RS So	Blanes, Spain
G	12	Nicole Ekhomu	5 ft 9 in (1.75 m)	Jr	Bolingbrook, IL
G	13	Nausia Woolfolk	5 ft 9 in (1.75 m)	Jr	Fort Valley, GA
F	15	Kiah Gillespie	6 ft 2 in (1.88 m)	RS Jr	Meriden, CT
G	24	Morgan Jones	6 ft 2 in (1.88 m)	Fr	Jonesboro, GA
G	31	Savannah Wilkinson	5 ft 11 in (1.8 m)	So	London, England
F	32	Valencia Myers	6 ft 3 in (1.91 m)	Fr	Solon, OH
G	33	Izabella Nicoletti	5 ft 10 in (1.78 m)	Fr	São Paulo, Brazil

Head coach

- Sue Semrau (UC San Diego)

Assistant coach(es)

- Brooke Wyckoff (Florida State)
- Joy McCorvey (St. John's)
- JC Carter (Stephen F. Austin)

Legend

- (C) Team captain
- (S) Suspended
- (I) Ineligible
- (W) Walk-on
- Injured
- Current redshirt

Roster
Last update: October 15, 2018

== Rankings ==
Ranking movements Legend: ██ Increase in ranking ██ Decrease in ranking — = Not ranked RV = Received votes т = Tied with team above or below
	Week																			
Poll	Pre	1	2	3	4	5	6	7	8	9	10	11	12	13	14	15	16	17	18	Final
AP	RV	RV	—	RV	RV	RV	RV	RV	RV	22	RV	22	24	24	21	22	22	22-T	25	Not released
Coaches	RV	RV	RV	RV	RV	RV	RV	25	23	18	21	19	21	19	19	20	21	21	22	23

== Schedule and results ==
Date time, TV	Rank^{#}	Opponent^{#}	Result	Record	Site (attendance) city, state
Exhibition
October 28, 2018*; 2:00 pm		Flagler	W 101–49	–	Donald L. Tucker Center; Tallahassee, FL
Non–Conference Regular season
November 6, 2018*; 11:00 am, ACCN Extra		Troy	W 103–67	1–0	Donald L. Tucker Center (3,895); Tallahassee, FL
November 9, 2018*; 7:00 pm, ACCN Extra		North Florida	W 74–53	2–0	Donald L. Tucker Center (2,191); Tallahassee, FL
November 11, 2018*; 3:00 pm, ACCN Extra		Florida; Rivalry	W 63–56	3–0	Donald L. Tucker Center (2,994); Tallahassee, FL
November 15, 2018*; 7:00 pm, ACCN Extra		Jacksonville	W 79–46	4–0	Donald L. Tucker Center (2,367); Tallahassee, FL
November 18, 2018*; 2:00 pm, ACCN Extra		LSU	L 45–58	4–1	Donald L. Tucker Center (3,002); Tallahassee, FL
November 23, 2018*; 3:00 pm, FloHoops		vs. Eastern Kentucky; Junkanoo Jam Bimini Division semifinal	W 62–45	5–1	Gateway Christian Academy; Bimini, Bahamas
November 24, 2018*; 6:45 pm, FloHoops		vs. No. 12 Iowa; Junkanoo Jam Bimini Division championship	W 71–67	6–1	Gateway Christian Academy; Bimini, Bahamas
November 29, 2018*; 7:00 pm, ACCN Extra		Penn State; ACC–Big Ten Women's Challenge	W 87–58	7–1	Donald L. Tucker Center (2,501); Tallahassee, FL
December 5, 2018*; 7:00 pm, ESPN3		at Mercer	W 57–56	8–1	Hawkins Arena (1,072); Macon, GA
December 9, 2018*; 2:00 pm, ESPN3		at St. John's	W 57–53	9–1	Carnesecca Arena (893); Queens, New York
December 16, 2018*; 2:00 pm, ACCN Extra		Creighton	W 71–52	10–1	Donald L. Tucker Center (2,501); Tallahassee, FL
December 20, 2018*; 8:00 pm, ESPN3		at Milwaukee	W 87–62	11–1	Klotsche Center (766); Milwaukee, WI
December 29, 2018*; 2:00 pm, ACCN Extra		Georgia State	W 79–43	12–1	Donald L. Tucker Center (2,578); Tallahassee, FL
ACC Regular season
January 3, 2019; 7:00 pm, ACCN Extra		at Virginia	W 63–61	13–1 (1–0)	John Paul Jones Arena (2,376); Charlottesville, VA
January 6, 2019; 1:00 pm, RSN		at North Carolina	W 64–63	14–1 (2–0)	Carmichael Arena (2,497); Chapel Hill, NC
January 13, 2019; 2:00 pm, ACCN Extra	No. 22	Clemson	L 45–57	14–2 (2–1)	Donald L. Tucker Center (3,317); Tallahassee, FL
January 17, 2019; 7:00 pm, ACCN Extra		at Boston College	W 91–71	15–2 (3–1)	Conte Forum (935); Chestnut Hill, MA
January 20, 2019; 2:00 pm, ACCN Extra		Duke	W 66–62	16–2 (4–1)	Donald L. Tucker Center (3,636); Tallahassee, FL
January 24, 2019; 7:00 pm, RSN	No. 22	No. 4 Louisville	L 49–68	16–3 (4–2)	Donald L. Tucker Center (3,446); Tallahassee, FL
January 27, 2019; 2:00 pm, ACCN Extra	No. 22	at Virginia Tech	W 56–54	17–3 (5–2)	Cassell Coliseum (1,915); Blacksburg, VA
January 31, 2019; 7:00 pm, ACCN Extra	No. 24	Miami (FL); Rivalry	W 62–58	18–3 (6–2)	Donald L. Tucker Center (3,570); Tallahassee, FL
February 3, 2019; 2:00 pm, ACCN Extra	No. 24	Wake Forest	W 85–61	19–3 (7–2)	Donald L. Tucker Center (3,114); Tallahassee, FL
February 7, 2019; 7:00 pm, ACCN Extra	No. 24	No. 9 NC State	W 75–70	20–3 (8–2)	Donald L. Tucker Center (2,734); Tallahassee, FL
February 10, 2019; 12:00 pm, ESPN	No. 24	at No. 4 Notre Dame	L 70–97	20–4 (8–3)	Edmund P. Joyce Center (8,950); South Bend, IN
February 14, 2019; 7:00 pm, ACCN Extra	No. 21	at Clemson	L 68–73	20–5 (8–4)	Littlejohn Coliseum (658); Clemson, SC
February 17, 2019; 2:00 pm, ACCN Extra	No. 21	Pittsburgh	W 78–46	21–5 (9–4)	Donald L. Tucker Center (3,134); Tallahassee, FL
February 24, 2019; 12:00 pm, ESPN2	No. 22	at No. 14 Miami (FL); Rivalry	L 54–64	21–6 (9–5)	Watsco Center (2,339); Coral Gables, FL
February 28, 2019; 7:00 pm, ACCN Extra	No. 22	No. 17 Syracuse	L 88–94	21–7 (9–6)	Donald L. Tucker Center (2,732); Tallahassee, FL
March 3, 2019; 1:00 pm, ACCN Extra	No. 22	at Georgia Tech	W 64–55	22–7 (10–6)	McCamish Pavilion (1,567); Atlanta, GA
ACC Women's Tournament
March 7, 2019; 8:00 pm, ACCRSN	(6) No. 22	vs. (11) Duke; Second Round	W 51–41	23–7	Greensboro Coliseum (4,024); Greensboro, NC
March 8, 2019; 8:00 pm, ACCRSN	(6) No. 22	vs. (3) No. 9 NC State; Quarterfinals	L 62–69	23–8	Greensboro Coliseum (5,646); Greensboro, NC
NCAA Women's Tournament
March 22, 2019*; 4:00 pm, ESPN2	(5 G) No. 25	vs. (12 G) Bucknell; Round of 64	W 70–67	24–8	Dale F. Halton Arena (1,750); Charlotte, NC
March 24, 2019*; 2:00 pm, ESPN2	(5 G) No. 25	vs. (4 G) No. 15 South Carolina; Round of 32	L 64–72	24–9	Dale F. Halton Arena (2,030); Charlotte, NC
*Non-conference game. ^{#}Rankings from AP Poll. (#) Tournament seedings in parentheses. G=Greensboro Region. All times are in Eastern Time.

== Awards ==
- All-ACC
  - First Team

Kiah Gillespie

  - Freshman Team

Valencia Myers
