= 2018–19 Boston College Eagles women's basketball team =

Intercollegiate basketball season

2018–19 Boston College Eagles women's basketball

Hawk Classic Champions
- Conference: Atlantic Coast Conference
- Record: 14–16 (3–13 ACC)
- Head coach: Joanna Bernabei-McNamee (1st season)
- Assistant coaches: Yolanda Griffith; AJ Cohen; George Porcha
- Home arena: Conte Forum

2018–19 ACC women's basketball standings
	Conf.				Overall
Team	W		L	PCT	W		L	PCT
No. 3 Notre Dame†	14	–	2	.875	35	–	4	.897
No. 5 Louisville	14	–	2	.875	32	–	4	.889
No. 10 NC State	12	–	4	.750	28	–	6	.824
No. 19 Miami (FL)	12	–	4	.750	25	–	9	.735
No. 12 Syracuse	11	–	5	.688	25	–	9	.735
No. 25 Florida State	10	–	6	.625	24	–	9	.727
Clemson	9	–	7	.563	20	–	13	.606
North Carolina	8	–	8	.500	18	–	15	.545
Georgia Tech	7	–	9	.438	17	–	13	.567
Virginia Tech	6	–	10	.375	22	–	12	.647
Duke	6	–	10	.375	15	–	15	.500
Virginia	5	–	11	.313	12	–	19	.387
Boston College	3	–	13	.188	14	–	16	.467
Pittsburgh	2	–	14	.125	11	–	20	.355
Wake Forest	1	–	15	.063	10	–	20	.333
† 2019 ACC tournament winner As of March 7, 2019; Rankings from AP poll

The 2018–19 Boston College Eagles women's basketball team represented Boston College during the 2018–19 NCAA Division I women's basketball season. The Eagles, were led by first year head coach Joanna Bernabei-McNamee. They played their home games at the Conte Forum and were members of the Atlantic Coast Conference. They finished the season 14–16, 3–13 in ACC play in thirteenth place. They lost in the first round of the ACC women's tournament to Virginia.

== Previous season ==
They finished the season 7–23, 2–14 in ACC play to finish in fourteenth place. They lost in the first round of the ACC women's tournament to North Carolina. On March 1 after the 2017–18 season, head coach Erik Johnson resigned. He finished at Boston College with a six-year record of 68–115. On April 10, Boston College hired former Albany head coach Joanna Bernabei-McNamee to be the next head coach of the team.

== Off-season ==
=== Recruiting class ===
College recruiting information
Name	Hometown	School	Height	Weight	Commit date
Janasae Bishop; PG	Hammond, IN	East Chicago Central	5 ft 8 in (1.73 m)	N/A	
Janasae Bishop; PG	Recruit ratings: ESPN: (90)				
Clara Ford; P	Vienna, VA	George C. Marshall	6 ft 3 in (1.91 m)	N/A	
Clara Ford; P	Recruit ratings: ESPN: (90)				
Taylor Soule; G	Lebanon, NH	Kimball Union Academy	5 ft 11 in (1.80 m)	N/A	
Taylor Soule; G	Recruit ratings: ESPN: (89)				
Kate Klimkiewicz; W	Oakton, VA	Paul VI Catholic High School	5 ft 11 in (1.80 m)	N/A	
Kate Klimkiewicz; W	Recruit ratings: ESPN: (89)				
Marnelle Garraud; PG	Lynn, MA	Noble and Greenough School	5 ft 8 in (1.73 m)	N/A	
Marnelle Garraud; PG	Recruit ratings: ESPN: (88)				
Lana Hollingsworth; G	Brighton, Australia	Haileybury Girls College	5 ft 8 in (1.73 m)	N/A	
Lana Hollingsworth; G	Recruit ratings: ESPN: (88)				
Overall recruit ranking:
Note: In many cases, Scout, Rivals, 247Sports, On3, and ESPN may conflict in their listings of height and weight.; In these cases, the average was taken. ESPN grades are on a 100-point scale.; Sources:

== Roster ==
2018–19 Boston College Eagles women's basketball team
Players
Coaches

Pos.	#	Name	Height	Year	Previous school	Hometown
G	0	Jenasae Bishop	5 ft 6 in (1.68 m)	Fr	East Chicago Central	Hammond, IN
G	4	Taylor Ortlepp	5 ft 10 in (1.78 m)	Jr	St. Ignatius College	Adelaide, Australia
F	5	Georgia Pineau	6 ft 1 in (1.85 m)	Jr	Caulfield Grammar	Victoria, Australia
G	10	Makayla Dickens	5 ft 8 in (1.73 m)	Fr	Princess Anne	Virginia Beach, VA
F	11	Emma Guy	6 ft 3 in (1.91 m)	Jr	Penfield	Penfield, NY
F	13	Taylor Soule	5 ft 11 in (1.8 m)	Fr	Kimball Union Academy	Lebanon, NH
G	14	Marnelle Garraud	5 ft 7 in (1.7 m)	Fr	Noble and Greenough School	Lynn, MA
G/F	22	Lana Hollingsworth	5 ft 10 in (1.78 m)	Fr	Haileybury Girls College	Brighton, Australia
G	23	Milan Bolden-Morris	5 ft 10 in (1.78 m)	So	Cardinal Newman	Belle Glade, FL
G/F	24	Kate Klimkiewicz	6 ft 0 in (1.83 m)	Fr	Paul VI Catholic High School	Oakton, VA
G	31	Sydney Lowery	5 ft 10 in (1.78 m)	So	St. Luke's School	Shelton, CT
C	32	Clara Ford	6 ft 3 in (1.91 m)	Fr	George C. Marshall	Vienna, VA

Head coach

- Joanna Bernabei-McNamee (West Liberty)

Assistant coach(es)

- Yolanda Griffith (Florida Atlantic)
- AJ Cohen (Louisville)
- George Porcha (New Haven)

Legend

- (C) Team captain
- (S) Suspended
- (I) Ineligible
- (W) Walk-on
- Injured
- Current redshirt

Roster
Last update: 2018-10-04

== Schedule ==
Date time, TV	Rank^{#}	Opponent^{#}	Result	Record	Site (attendance) city, state
Non-conference regular season
November 8, 2018*; 7:00 pm		at Rhode Island	W 88–64	1–0	Ryan Center (373); Kingston, RI
November 11, 2018*; 4:00 pm, ACCN Extra		St. Peter's	W 89–57	2–0	Conte Forum (509); Chestnut Hill, MA
November 15, 2018*; 11:30 am, ACCN Extra		Holy Cross	W 89–63	3–0	Conte Forum (3,117); Chestnut Hill, MA
November 18, 2018*; 2:00 pm		at Houston	W 64–57	4–0	H&PE Arena; Houston, TX
November 24, 2018*; 2:00 pm		vs. Loyola (MD); Hawk Classic semifinals	W 73–47	5–0	Hagan Arena (737); Philadelphia, PA
November 25, 2018*; 12:00 pm		vs. Rider; Hawk Classic Championship	W 112–61	6–0	Hagan Arena; Philadelphia, PA
November 27, 2018*; 7:00 pm, ACCN Extra		Providence	L 57–61	6–1	Conte Forum (722); Chestnut Hill, MA
December 2, 2018*; 2:00 pm, ACCN Extra		Columbia	W 74–60	7–1	Conte Forum (782); Chestnut Hill, MA
December 6, 2018*; 7:00 pm, ACCN Extra		Bryant	W 83–46	8–1	Conte Forum (652); Chestnut Hill, MA
December 9, 2018*; 2:00 pm, ACCN Extra		No. 14 Minnesota	L 69–77	8–2	Conte Forum (1,417); Chestnut Hill, MA
December 16, 2018*; 4:00 pm, ACCN Extra		Boston University; Green Line Rivalry	W 78–51	9–2	Conte Forum (887); Chestnut Hill, MA
December 21, 2018*; 7:00 pm, ACCN Extra		Campbell	W 76–56	10–2	Conte Forum (779); Chestnut Hill, MA
December 29, 2018*; 2:00 pm, ACCN Extra		Dartmouth	W 99–68	11–2	Conte Forum (1,411); Chestnut Hill, MA
ACC regular season
January 3, 2019; 7:00 pm, ACCN Extra		Georgia Tech	L 76–81	11–3 (0–1)	Conte Forum (1,254); Chestnut Hill, MA
January 6, 2019; 2:00 pm, ACCN Extra		No. 9 NC State	L 69–85	11–4 (0–2)	Conte Forum (1,475); Chestnut Hill, MA
January 10, 2019; 7:00 pm, RSN		at Wake Forest	W 65–64	12–4 (1–2)	LJVM Coliseum (467); Winston-Salem, NC
January 13, 2019; 1:00 pm, RSN		at Pittsburgh	W 59–55	13–4 (2–2)	Petersen Events Center (2,630); Pittsburgh, PA
January 17, 2019; 7:00 pm, ACCN Extra		Florida State	L 71–91	13–5 (2–3)	Conte Forum (935); Chestnut Hill, MA
January 20, 2019; 1:00 pm, ACCN Extra		at No. 1 Notre Dame	L 63–92	13–6 (2–4)	Edmund P. Joyce Center (8,714); South Bend, IN
January 27, 2019; 1:00 pm, ACCN Extra		at Miami	L 73–76	13–7 (2–5)	Watsco Center (1,108); Coral Gables, FL
January 31, 2019; 7:00 pm, ACCN Extra		Duke	W 92–90 ^{2OT}	14–7 (3–5)	Conte Forum (925); Chestnut Hill, MA
February 3, 2019; 1:00 pm, ACCN Extra		Virginia Tech	L 86–95	14–8 (3–6)	Conte Forum (1,590); Chestnut Hill, MA
February 7, 2019; 7:00 pm, ACCN Extra		at Virginia	L 77–79 ^{OT}	14–9 (3–7)	John Paul Jones Arena (2,382); Charlottesville, VA
February 10, 2019; 2:00 pm, ACCN Extra		at No. 15 Syracuse	L 69–96	14–10 (3–8)	Carrier Dome (2,730); Syracuse, NY
February 13, 2019; 7:00 pm, ACCN Extra		No. 6 Notre Dame	L 47–97	14–11 (3–9)	Conte Forum (1,598); Chestnut Hill, MA
February 16, 2019; 1:00 pm, ACCN Extra		Clemson	L 58–91	14–12 (3–10)	Conte Forum (1,932); Chestnut Hill, MA
February 21, 2019; 7:00 pm, ACCN Extra		at North Carolina	L 78–93	14–13 (3–11)	Carmichael Arena (1,950); Chapel Hill, NC
February 24, 2019; 2:00 pm, ACCN Extra		at No. 4 Louisville	L 51–87	14–14 (3–12)	KFC Yum! Center (11,132); Louisville, KY
March 3, 2018; 2:00 pm, ACCN Extra		Syracuse	L 59–76	14–15 (3–13)	Conte Forum (2,245); Chestnut Hill, MA
ACC Women's Tournament
March 6, 2019; 1:00 pm, RSN	(13)	vs. (12) Virginia; First Round	L 61–77	14–16	Greensboro Coliseum; Greensboro, NC
*Non-conference game. ^{#}Rankings from AP Poll. (#) Tournament seedings in parentheses. All times are in Eastern.

== Rankings ==
Regular season polls
Poll	Pre- Season	Week 2	Week 3	Week 4	Week 5	Week 6	Week 7	Week 8	Week 9	Week 10	Week 11	Week 12	Week 13	Week 14	Week 15	Week 16	Week 17	Week 18	Week 19	Final
AP																				
Coaches																				

Legend
	Increase in ranking
	Decrease in ranking
	No change
(RV)	Received votes
(NR)	Not ranked

== See also ==
- 2018–19 Boston College Eagles men's basketball team
