= 2018–19 Wake Forest Demon Deacons women's basketball team =

Intercollegiate basketball season

2018–19 Wake Forest Demon Deacons women's basketball
- Conference: Atlantic Coast Conference
- Record: 10–20 (1–15 ACC)
- Head coach: Jen Hoover (7th season)
- Assistant coaches: Jermaine Woods; Melissa D'Amico; Dane Sparrow
- Home arena: LJVM Coliseum

2018–19 ACC women's basketball standings
	Conf.				Overall
Team	W		L	PCT	W		L	PCT
No. 3 Notre Dame†	14	–	2	.875	35	–	4	.897
No. 5 Louisville	14	–	2	.875	32	–	4	.889
No. 10 NC State	12	–	4	.750	28	–	6	.824
No. 19 Miami (FL)	12	–	4	.750	25	–	9	.735
No. 12 Syracuse	11	–	5	.688	25	–	9	.735
No. 25 Florida State	10	–	6	.625	24	–	9	.727
Clemson	9	–	7	.563	20	–	13	.606
North Carolina	8	–	8	.500	18	–	15	.545
Georgia Tech	7	–	9	.438	17	–	13	.567
Virginia Tech	6	–	10	.375	22	–	12	.647
Duke	6	–	10	.375	15	–	15	.500
Virginia	5	–	11	.313	12	–	19	.387
Boston College	3	–	13	.188	14	–	16	.467
Pittsburgh	2	–	14	.125	11	–	20	.355
Wake Forest	1	–	15	.063	10	–	20	.333
† 2019 ACC tournament winner As of March 7, 2019; Rankings from AP poll

The 2018–19 Wake Forest Demon Deacons women's basketball team represented Wake Forest University during the 2018–19 NCAA Division I women's basketball season. The Demon Deacons, led by seventh -year head coach Jen Hoover, were members of the Atlantic Coast Conference and played their home games at the Lawrence Joel Veterans Memorial Coliseum. They finished the season 10–20, 1–15 in ACC play to finish in last place. They lost in the first round of the ACC women's tournament to Virginia Tech.

== Previous season ==
The Demon Deacons finished the season 14–17, 5–11 in ACC play in eleventh place. They defeated Pittsburgh in the first round before losing in the second round of the ACC women's tournament to Miami (FL). The Demon Deacons were not invited to a post-season tournament.

== Off-season ==
=== Recruiting class ===
College recruiting
Name	Hometown	School	Height	Weight	Commit date
Lindsey Jarosinski; F	Medinah, Illinois	Montini Catholic High School	6 ft 4 in (1.93 m)	N/A	
Lindsey Jarosinski; F	Recruit ratings: ESPN: (90)				
Christina Morra; F	Toronto, Canada	King's Christian Collegiate	6 ft 3 in (1.91 m)	N/A	
Christina Morra; F	Recruit ratings: ESPN: (90)				
Kaylen Dickson; G	Gurnee, Illinois	Warren Township High School	6 ft 0 in (1.83 m)	N/A	
Kaylen Dickson; G	Recruit ratings: ESPN: (88)				
Overall recruit ranking:
Note: In many cases, Scout, Rivals, 247Sports, On3, and ESPN may conflict in their listings of height and weight.; In these cases, the average was taken. ESPN grades are on a 100-point scale.; Sources:

== Roster ==
2018–19 Wake Forest Demon Deacons women's basketball team
Players
Coaches

Pos.	#	Name	Height	Year	Previous school	Hometown
F	0	Maya Banks	6 ft 4 in (1.93 m)	So	Hamilton	Chandler, AZ
G	5	Gina Conti	5 ft 10 in (1.78 m)	So	Grove City	Grove City, OH
G	11	Ellen Hahne	5 ft 11 in (1.8 m)	Fr	Riksbasketgymansiet Luleå	Stockholm, Sweden
F	11	Ivana Raca	6 ft 2 in (1.88 m)	So	1st Lyceum of Voula	Belgrade, Serbia
G	12	Kaylen Dickson	5 ft 11 in (1.8 m)	Fr	Warren Township	Gurnee, IL
G	14	Alex Sharp	6 ft 1 in (1.85 m)	Jr	Australian Institute of Sport	Melbourne, Australia
F	21	Raegyn Branch	6 ft 2 in (1.88 m)	RS So	Arlington	Arlington, TN
G	22	McKenna Frank	5 ft 9 in (1.75 m)	RS So	St. Luke's	Stamford, CT
F	23	Christina Morra	6 ft 2 in (1.88 m)	Fr	King's Christian Collegiate	Toronto, Canada
G	25	Ariel Stephenson	5 ft 10 in (1.78 m)	Sr	Prince George	Prince George, VA
F	41	Elisa Penna	6 ft 3 in (1.91 m)	Sr	ITC F. Foscari	Bergamo, Italy
F	42	Tyra Whitehead	6 ft 3 in (1.91 m)	Jr	Cosby	Richmond, VA
F	44	Ona Udoh	6 ft 1 in (1.85 m)	Jr	Terry Sanford	Fayetteville, NC
F	50	Lindsey Jarosinski	6 ft 3 in (1.91 m)	Fr	Montini Catholic	Medinah, IL

Head coach

- Jen Hoover (Wake Forest)

Assistant coach(es)

- Melissa D'Amico (Notre Dame)
- Jermaine Woods (Christopher Newport)
- Dane Sparrow (UNC Greensboro)

Legend

- (C) Team captain
- (S) Suspended
- (I) Ineligible
- (W) Walk-on
- Injured
- Current redshirt

Roster
Last update: November 1, 2018

== Schedule ==
Date time, TV	Rank^{#}	Opponent^{#}	Result	Record	Site (attendance) city, state
Non-conference regular season
November 6, 2018*; 7:00 pm, ACCN Extra		Towson	W 60–53	1–0	LJVM Coliseum (387); Winston–Salem, NC
November 9, 2018*; 7:00 pm, ACCN Extra		Mercer	W 69–54	2–0	LJVM Coliseum (312); Winston–Salem, NC
November 11, 2018*; 1:00 pm, ACCN Extra		Richmond	W 62–48	3–0	LJVM Coliseum (407); Winston–Salem, NC
November 18, 2018*; 6:00 pm		at VCU	L 40–53	3–1	Siegel Center (753); Richmond, VA
November 21, 2018*; 7:00 pm, ACCN Extra		Xavier	L 50–62	3–2	LJVM Coliseum (216); Winston–Salem, NC
November 24, 2018*; 2:00 pm		at East Carolina	L 61–70	3–3	Williams Arena (901); Greenville, NC
November 28, 2018*; 7:00 pm, ACCN Extra		Indiana; ACC–Big Ten Women's Challenge	L 73–87	3–4	LJVM Coliseum (397); Winston–Salem, NC
December 2, 2018*; 1:00 pm, ACCN Extra		St. John's	W 64–59	4–4	LJVM Coliseum (320); Winston–Salem, NC
December 5, 2018*; 7:00 pm		at Charlotte	W 69–43	5–4	Dale F. Halton Arena (819); Charlotte, NC
December 8, 2018*; 4:00 pm, ACCN Extra		Maryland Eastern Shore	W 78–67	6–4	LJVM Coliseum (388); Winston–Salem, NC
December 17, 2018*; 11:00 am, ACCN Extra		James Madison	W 50–49	7–4	LJVM Coliseum (9,786); Winston–Salem, NC
December 19, 2018*; 8:30 pm		vs. South Carolina State; Myrtle Beach Invitational	W 58–44	8–4	Myrtle Beach Convention Center; Myrtle Beach, SC
December 30, 2018*; 1:00 pm, ACCN Extra		Norfolk State	W 63–61	9–4	LJVM Coliseum (388); Winston–Salem, NC
ACC regular season
January 6, 2019; 1:00 pm, ACCN Extra		Miami (FL)	L 57–72	9–5 (0–1)	LJVM Coliseum (704); Winston–Salem, NC
January 10, 2019; 7:00 pm, RSN		Boston College	L 64–65	9–6 (0–2)	LJVM Coliseum (467); Winston–Salem, NC
January 13, 2019; 1:00 pm, ACCN Extra		at No. 1 Notre Dame	L 48–78	9–7 (0–3)	Edmund P. Joyce Center (8,392); South Bend, IN
January 17, 2019; 7:00 pm, RSN		at North Carolina	L 61–84	9–8 (0–4)	Carmichael Arena (2,056); Chapel Hill, NC
January 20, 2019; 1:00 pm, ACCN Extra		No. 4 Louisville	L 49–73	9–9 (0–5)	LJVM Coliseum (1,193); Winston–Salem, NC
January 24, 2019; 7:00 pm, ACCN Extra		at Duke	L 52–66	9–10 (0–6)	Cameron Indoor Stadium (3,202); Durham, NC
January 27, 2019; 3:00 pm, RSN		at Virginia	W 52–42	10–10 (1–6)	John Paul Jones Arena (3,898); Charlottesville, VA
January 31, 2019; 7:00 pm, ACCN Extra		No. 7 NC State	L 50–59	10–11 (1–7)	LJVM Coliseum (1,457); Winston–Salem, NC
February 3, 2019; 2:00 pm, ACCN Extra		at No. 24 Florida State	L 61–85	10–12 (1–8)	Donald L. Tucker Center (3,114); Tallahassee, FL
February 7, 2019; 7:00 pm, RSN		Clemson	L 53–69	10–13 (1–9)	LJVM Coliseum (527); Winston–Salem, NC
February 10, 2019; 1:00 pm, ACCN Extra		Georgia Tech	L 46–60	10–14 (1–10)	LJVM Coliseum (1,017); Winston–Salem, NC
February 17, 2019; 2:00 pm, ACCN Extra		at Syracuse	L 57–77	10–15 (1–11)	Carrier Dome (2,579); Syracuse, NY
February 21, 2019; 7:00 pm, RSN		at NC State	L 46–80	10–16 (1–12)	Reynolds Coliseum (2,564); Raleigh, NC
February 24, 2019; 1:00 pm, ACCN Extra		Duke	L 44–55	10–17 (1–13)	LJVM Coliseum (2,037); Winston–Salem, NC
February 28, 2019; 7:00 pm, ACCN Extra		Pittsburgh	L 64–70	10–18 (1–14)	LJVM Coliseum (589); Winston–Salem, NC
March 3, 2019; 2:00 pm, ACCN Extra		Virginia Tech	L 57–69	10–19 (1–15)	Cassell Coliseum (2,418); Blacksburg, VA
ACC Women's Tournament
March 6, 2019; 3:30 pm, RSN	(15)	vs. (10) Virginia Tech; First Round	L 63–85	10–20	Greensboro Coliseum (3,172); Greensboro, NC
*Non-conference game. ^{#}Rankings from AP Poll. (#) Tournament seedings in parentheses. All times are in Eastern.

== See also ==
- 2018–19 Wake Forest Demon Deacons men's basketball team
