= 2018–19 Virginia Cavaliers women's basketball team =

Intercollegiate basketball season

2018–19 Virginia Cavaliers women's basketball
- Conference: Atlantic Coast Conference
- Record: 12–19 (5–11 ACC)
- Head coach: Tina Thompson (1st season)
- Assistant coaches: Karleen Thompson; La'Keshia Frett Meredith; Jama Sharp
- Home arena: John Paul Jones Arena

2018–19 ACC women's basketball standings
	Conf.				Overall
Team	W		L	PCT	W		L	PCT
No. 3 Notre Dame†	14	–	2	.875	35	–	4	.897
No. 5 Louisville	14	–	2	.875	32	–	4	.889
No. 10 NC State	12	–	4	.750	28	–	6	.824
No. 19 Miami (FL)	12	–	4	.750	25	–	9	.735
No. 12 Syracuse	11	–	5	.688	25	–	9	.735
No. 25 Florida State	10	–	6	.625	24	–	9	.727
Clemson	9	–	7	.563	20	–	13	.606
North Carolina	8	–	8	.500	18	–	15	.545
Georgia Tech	7	–	9	.438	17	–	13	.567
Virginia Tech	6	–	10	.375	22	–	12	.647
Duke	6	–	10	.375	15	–	15	.500
Virginia	5	–	11	.313	12	–	19	.387
Boston College	3	–	13	.188	14	–	16	.467
Pittsburgh	2	–	14	.125	11	–	20	.355
Wake Forest	1	–	15	.063	10	–	20	.333
† 2019 ACC tournament winner As of March 7, 2019; Rankings from AP poll

The 2018–19 Virginia Cavaliers women's basketball team represented the University of Virginia during the 2018–19 NCAA Division I women's basketball season. The Cavaliers, led by first-year head coach Tina Thompson, played their home games at John Paul Jones Arena and were members the Atlantic Coast Conference. They finished the season 12–19, 5–11 in ACC play to finish in twelfth place. They advanced to the second round of the ACC women's tournament, where they lost to Syracuse.

== Previous season ==
The 2017–18 Cavaliers finished the season 19–14, 10–6 in ACC play to finish in a three-way tie for sixth place. They advanced to the quarterfinals of the ACC women's tournament, where they lost to Notre Dame. They received an at-large bid to the NCAA women's tournament, which was their first trip since 2009, where they defeated California first round before losing to South Carolina in the second round.

On March 20, Boyle announced her retirement, initially citing an unspecified family matter. She later revealed that she retired because of snags in her ongoing attempt to finalize the adoption of her Senegalese daughter. Boyle finished at Virginia with a record of 129–98.

On April 16, 2018 Tina Thompson was named as her replacement.

=== Recruiting class ===
College recruiting
Name	Hometown	School	Height	Weight	Commit date
Erica Martinsen; G	Clarence, New York	IMG Academy	5 ft 11 in (1.80 m)	N/A	
Erica Martinsen; G	Recruit ratings: ESPN: (90)				
Overall recruit ranking:
Note: In many cases, Scout, Rivals, 247Sports, On3, and ESPN may conflict in their listings of height and weight.; In these cases, the average was taken. ESPN grades are on a 100-point scale.; Sources:

== Roster ==
2018–19 Virginia Cavaliers women's basketball team
Players
Coaches

Pos.	#	Name	Height	Year	Previous school	Hometown
G	1	Brianna Tinsley	5 ft 7 in (1.7 m)	So	St. Anne's-Belfield	Madison, VA
G	4	Dominique Toussaint	5 ft 9 in (1.75 m)	Jr	Christ the King	Staten Island, NY
G	5	Khyasia Caldwell	5 ft 5 in (1.65 m)	So	Pocono Mountain East	Pocono Summit, PA
G	10	Dani Lawson	6 ft 2 in (1.88 m)	So	Hathaway Brown; Purdue	Cleveland, OH
G/F	13	Jocelyn Willoughby	6 ft 0 in (1.83 m)	Jr	Newark Academy	Woodbridge, VA
F	14	Lisa Jablonowski	6 ft 3 in (1.91 m)	Jr	Lycée de garçons	Ernster, Luxembourg
G	20	Erica Martinsen	5 ft 9 in (1.75 m)	RS Fr	IMG Academy	Clarence, NY
G	23	Amandine Toi	6 ft 1 in (1.85 m)	RS Fr	INSEP Academy	Paris, France
C	30	Felicia Aiyeotan	6 ft 9 in (2.06 m)	So	Blair Academy	Lagos, Nigeria
F	32	Moné Jones	6 ft 3 in (1.91 m)	Sr	Riverside	Durham, NC
F	35	Shakyna Payne	6 ft 3 in (1.91 m)	Jr	Southwest Atlanta Christian Academy	Acworth, GA

Head coach

- Tina Thompson (USC)

Assistant coach(es)

- Karleen Thompson (USC)
- La'Keisha Frett Meredith (Georgia)
- Jama Sharp (Stetson)

Legend

- (C) Team captain
- (S) Suspended
- (I) Ineligible
- (W) Walk-on
- Injured
- Current redshirt

Roster
Last update: October 30, 2018

== Schedule ==
Date time, TV	Rank^{#}	Opponent^{#}	Result	Record	Site (attendance) city, state
Non-conference regular season
November 9, 2018*; 7:00 pm, ACCN Extra		No. 6 Mississippi State	L 44–72	0–1	John Paul Jones Arena (4,453); Charlottesville, VA
November 15, 2018*; 8:30 pm, SECN		at Kentucky	L 51–63	0–2	Rupp Arena (4,989); Lexington, KY
November 18, 2018*; 2:00 pm		at Old Dominion	W 73–67	1–2	Ted Constant Convocation Center (2,137); Norfolk, VA
November 20, 2018*; 11:00 am, ACCN Extra		North Carolina A&T	W 67–57	2–2	John Paul Jones Arena (10,000); Charlottesville, VA
November 24, 2018*; 2:00 pm, ACCN Extra		Central Michigan; Cavalier Classic	L 61–74	2–3	John Paul Jones Arena (2,572); Charlottesville, VA
November 25, 2018*; 3:30 pm, ACCN Extra		Saint Louis; Cavalier Classic	L 65–67	2–4	John Paul Jones Arena (2,413); Charlottesville, VA
November 28, 2018*; 7:00 pm, BTN		at Michigan State; ACC–Big Ten Women's Challenge	L 66–91	2–5	Breslin Center (4,219); East Lansing, MI
December 2, 2018*; 2:00 pm, ACCN Extra		Coppin State	W 55–41	3–5	John Paul Jones Arena (2,304); Charlottesville, VA
December 5, 2018*; 7:00 pm, ACCN Extra		American	W 57–54	4–5	John Paul Jones Arena (2,549); Charlottesville, VA
December 8, 2018*; 2:00 pm, ACCN Extra		Radford	L 44–57	4–6	John Paul Jones Arena (2,365); Charlottesville, VA
December 20, 2018*; 4:00 pm, FloHoops		vs. Alabama; Florida Sunshine Classic	L 52–64	4–7	Warden Arena (298); Orlando, FL
December 21, 2018*; 4:00 pm, FloHoops		vs. South Florida; Florida Sunshine Classic	W 74–67	5–7	Warden Arena (373); Orlando, FL
December 30, 2018*; 2:00 pm, ACCN Extra		Charlotte	W 65–61	6–7	John Paul Jones Arena (2,841); Charlottesville, VA
ACC regular season
January 3, 2019; 7:00 pm, ACCN Extra		Florida State	L 61–63	6–8 (0–1)	John Paul Jones Arena (2,376); Charlottesville, VA
January 6, 2019; 2:00 pm, ACCN Extra		at Clemson	L 65–71	6–9 (0–2)	Littlejohn Coliseum (1,056); Clemson, SC
January 10, 2019; 7:00 pm, ACCN Extra		Virginia Tech; Rivalry	W 62–58	7–9 (1–2)	John Paul Jones Arena (2,703); Charlottesville, VA
January 13, 2019; 2:00 pm, ACCN Extra		No. 8 NC State	L 38–66	7–10 (1–3)	John Paul Jones Arena (2,530); Charlottesville, VA
January 17, 2019; 7:00 pm, ACCN Extra		at No. 4 Louisville	L 43–91	7–11 (1–4)	KFC Yum! Center (7,834); Louisville, KY
January 24, 2019; 7:00 pm, ACCN Extra		at Pittsburgh	W 74–57	8–11 (2–4)	Peterson Events Center (447); Pittsburgh, PA
January 27, 2019; 3:00 pm, RSN		Wake Forest	L 42–52	8–12 (2–5)	John Paul Jones Arena (3,898); Charlottesville, VA
January 31, 2019; 7:00 pm, ACCN Extra		at No. 18 Syracuse	L 68–72	8–13 (2–6)	Carrier Dome (1,585); Syracuse, NY
February 3, 2019; 1:00 pm, ACCN Extra		at Miami (FL)	L 59–72	8–14 (2–7)	Watsco Center (1,059); Coral Gables, FL
February 7, 2019; 7:00 pm, ACCN Extra		Boston College	W 79–77 ^{OT}	9–14 (3–7)	John Paul Jones Arena (2,382); Charlottesville, VA
February 10, 2019; 2:00 pm, ACCN Extra		Duke	W 53–47	10–14 (4–7)	John Paul Jones Arena (3,536); Charlottesville, VA
February 17, 2019; 3:00 pm, RSN		at North Carolina	L 53–70	10–15 (4–8)	Carmichael Arena (3,445); Chapel Hill, NC
February 21, 2019; 7:00 pm, ACCN Extra		No. 4 Louisville	L 49–71	10–16 (4–9)	John Paul Jones Arena (2,588); Charlottesville, VA
February 24, 2019; 3:00 pm, RSN		Georgia Tech	W 53–45	11–16 (5–9)	John Paul Jones Arena (3,834); Charlottesville, VA
February 28, 2019; 7:00 pm, ACCN Extra		at Virginia Tech	L 45–63	11–17 (5–10)	Cassell Coliseum (2,287); Blacksburg, VA
March 3, 2019; 12:30 pm, RSN		at No. 4 Notre Dame	L 66–103	11–18 (5–11)	Edmund P. Joyce Center (9,149); South Bend, IN
ACC Women's Tournament
March 6, 2019; 1:00 pm, RSN	(12)	vs. (13) Boston College; First Round	W 77–61	12–18	Greensboro Coliseum; Greensboro, NC
March 7, 2019; 11:00 am, RSN	(12)	vs. (5) No. 18 Syracuse; Second Round	L 57–67	12–19	Greensboro Coliseum (6,522); Greensboro, NC
*Non-conference game. ^{#}Rankings from AP Poll. (#) Tournament seedings in parentheses. All times are in Eastern.

== Rankings ==
Regular season polls
Poll	Pre- season	Week 2	Week 3	Week 4	Week 5	Week 6	Week 7	Week 8	Week 9	Week 10	Week 11	Week 12	Week 13	Week 14	Week 15	Week 16	Week 17	Week 18	Week 19	Final
AP	RV																			N/A
Coaches																				

Legend
	Increase in ranking
	Decrease in ranking
	Not ranked previous week
(RV)	Received votes

== See also ==
- 2018–19 Virginia Cavaliers men's basketball team
