= Paris Kea =

American basketball player (born 1996)

Free agent
- Position: Point guard
- League: WNBA

Personal information
- Born: April 7, 1996 (age 30) Tarboro, North Carolina, U.S.
- Listed height: 5 ft 9 in (1.75 m)
- Listed weight: 142 lb (64 kg)

Career information
- High school: Page (Greensboro, North Carolina)
- College: Vanderbilt (2014–2015); North Carolina (2016–2019)
- WNBA draft: 2019: 3rd round, 25th overall pick
- Drafted by: Indiana Fever
- Playing career: 2019–present

Career history
- 2019: Indiana Fever
- 2020: New York Liberty

Career highlights
- 2× First-team All-ACC (2018, 2019)
- Stats at Basketball Reference
Medals
Women's basketball
Representing the United States
FIBA Under-18 Americas Championship
Gold medal – first place	2014 United States	Team

Paris Yvonne Kea (born April 7, 1996) is an American professional basketball player who most recently played for the New York Liberty of the Women's National Basketball Association (WNBA). She was selected 25th in the 2019 WNBA draft by the Indiana Fever. She played college basketball at North Carolina.

== Early life ==
Kea was born in Tarboro, North Carolina. She graduated from Walter Hines Page Senior High School in Greensboro, North Carolina in 2014.

== College career ==
=== Vanderbilt (2014–2015) ===
Kea began her college career at Vanderbilt. As a Freshman she appeared in 31 games with 8 starts. After the season ended Kea announced that she would transfer to North Carolina.

=== North Carolina (2015–2019) ===
Sat out due to NCAA transfer regulations.

In her first season with North Carolina, Kea led the team in points and assists.

Kea averaged 19.4 points per game which was good for third in the ACC. Kea also earned First Team All-ACC Honors.

First Team All ACC and WBCA All-America Honorable Mention. As the lone senior on the team Kea lead North Carolina to its first NCAA tournament appearance in her college career, they were defeated in the first round by California.

== Professional career ==
The Indiana Fever selected Paris Kea with the 25th pick in the 2019 WNBA Draft. After one season with the Fever playing mainly in a reserve role she was released on April 22, 2020.

On August 7, 2020, Kea signed with the New York Liberty. She missed the 2021 season due to injury. Kea was waived by the Liberty on April 27, 2022.

== WNBA career statistics ==
Legend
GP	Games played	GS	Games started	MPG	Minutes per game
FG%	Field goal percentage	3P%	3-point field goal percentage	FT%	Free throw percentage
RPG	Rebounds per game	APG	Assists per game	SPG	Steals per game
BPG	Blocks per game	PPG	Points per game	**Bold**	Career high

=== Regular season ===
Year	Team	GP	GS	MPG	FG%	3P%	FT%	RPG	APG	SPG	BPG	PPG
2019	Indiana	11	0	5.5	.407	.556	.500	0.5	0.5	0.1	0.2	2.6
2020	New York	11	5	15.0	.384	.394	.875	2.0	1.5	0.6	0.3	6.9
Career		22	5	10.2	.390	.429	.750	1.2	1.0	0.4	0.2	4.8
