= Elizabeth Balogun =

Nigerian basketball player

- Elizabeth Balogun

No. 5 – CB Bembibre
- Position: Guard / Forward
- League: Liga Femenina

Personal information
- Born: September 9, 2000 (age 26) Lagos, Nigeria
- Listed height: 6 ft 1 in (1.85 m)

Career information
- High school: Hamilton Heights Christian Academy (Chattanooga, Tennessee)
- College: Georgia Tech (2018–2019); Louisville (2019–2021); Duke (2021–2023)
- Playing career: 2023–present

Career history
- 2023-present: Bembibre

Career highlights
- ACC Rookie of the Year (2019); ACC All-Freshman Team (2019); McDonald's All-American (2018)
- Stats at Basketball Reference

Elizabeth Balogun (born 9 September 2000) is a Nigerian basketball player. She played college basketball for the Duke Blue Devils and the Nigerian national team. She plays for the Spanish Liga Femenina de Baloncesto side CB Bembire.

== High school career ==
Balogun transferred to Hamilton Heights Christian Academy, Tennessee, in the eighth grade from Lagos, Nigeria. She averaged 15.1 points, 4.6 rebounds, 2.7 blocks, and 2.1 assists. She made the ALL-USA Girls Basketball First Team at the end of high school.

== College career ==
Balogun started as a freshman at Georgia Tech in 2018. She left the team for Louisville after being named the 2018–19 Freshman of the Year, having averaged 14.64 points per game in her freshman season. In her sophomore year at Louisville, she was named preseason All-ACC by Coaches and Blue Ribbon Panel and also made the Citizen Naismith Watch List. Balogun later transferred to Duke in 2021.

== International career ==
Balogun was called up to represent the D'Tigress and participate in the 2019 pre-Olympic qualifying tournament in Mozambique, but she was not released by Louisville. She was also called up to participate in the Tokyo 2020 Olympic qualifiers in Belgrade. She also participated in the 2024 FIBA Women's Olympic Qualifying Tournaments where she averaged 9 points, 4 rebounds and 3 assists.

== Personal life ==
Balogun is the second of 3 children. Her older brother, Ezekiel, played at The Citadel in South Carolina. Her younger sister, Ruth, played at Hamilton Heights and currently plays at the University of Central Arkansas. Her mom, Justina, died of breast cancer before Balogun moved to America, while her dad, Mark, resides in Nigeria, where he is a basketball coach and policeman.
