= Lance White (basketball) =

American college basketball coach

Biographical details
- Education: Texas Tech University

Coaching career (HC unless noted)
- 1992–1993: Texas Tech (student assistant)
- 1993–1995: Texas Tech (graduate assistant)
- 1995–2003: Texas Tech (assistant)
- 2003–2018: Florida State (associate head coach)
- 2018–2023: Pittsburgh
- 2024–present: Hofstra (assoc. head coach)

Accomplishments and honors

Awards
- WBCA National Assistant Coach of the Year (2017)

Lance White is a retired American college basketball coach. He was the 2018 Women's Basketball Coaches Association Assistant Coach of the Year. In 2025, he was inducted into the Texas Tech University Ring of Honor as part of the 1993 National Championship Team.

== Career ==
White has been part of seven Sweet Sixteen appearances, six Elite Eight appearances and one National Championship during his coaching career.

White began his Division I coaching career at Texas Tech, where he spent 10 seasons as an assistant coach. During his tenure, the Lady Raiders made five Sweet Sixteen appearances, three Elite Eight appearances, and won the 1993 NCAA National Championship.

In 2003, White was named an assistant coach at Florida State University. He was promoted to associate head Coach in 2012. During his 15 seasons with the Seminoles, Florida State made 13 NCAA Tournament appearances, including two Sweet Sixteen appearances and three Elite Eight appearances.

In April 2018, White was named the head coach of The University of Pittsburgh women's basketball program. He led the Panthers for five seasons before departing following the 2022-2023 season.

== Other ==
White won $172,500 as a contestant on the Snake Oil episode "Ice-T and Natasha Leggero".

White is married to Melanie White, PhD who is an educator in NYC Public Schools. They have two children, Quentin and Vivian, who attend Florida Gulf Coast University.
