= 2018–19 Northeastern Huskies women's basketball team =

Intercollegiate basketball season

2018–19 Northeastern Huskies women's basketball
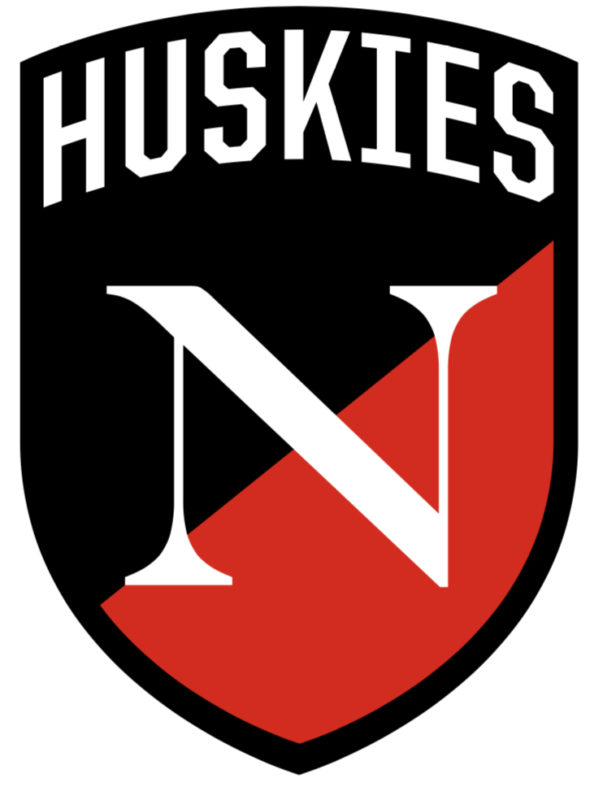

WNIT, First Round
- Conference: Colonial Athletic Association
- Record: 20–12 (9–9 CAA)
- Head coach: Kelly Cole (5th season)
- Assistant coaches: Whitney Edwards; Mandy Pennewell; Ashley Robinson
- Home arena: Cabot Center

2018–19 CAA women's basketball standings
	Conf.				Overall
Team	W		L	PCT	W		L	PCT
James Madison	17	–	1	.944	29	–	6	.829
Drexel	14	–	4	.778	24	–	9	.727
Towson †	11	–	7	.611	20	–	13	.606
Delaware	11	–	7	.611	16	–	15	.516
UNC Wilmington	11	–	7	.611	18	–	12	.600
Northeastern	9	–	9	.500	20	–	12	.625
William & Mary	7	–	11	.389	14	–	17	.452
Elon	4	–	14	.222	9	–	21	.300
Hofstra	3	–	15	.167	11	–	22	.333
Charleston	3	–	15	.167	7	–	23	.233
† 2019 CAA tournament winner As of March 31, 2019; Rankings from AP poll

The 2018–19 Northeastern Huskies women's basketball team represented the Northeastern University during the 2018–19 NCAA Division I women's basketball season. The Huskies, led by fifth-year head coach Kelly Cole, played their home games at the Cabot Center and were members of the Colonial Athletic Association (CAA). They finished the season 20–12, 9–9 CAA play to finish in sixth place. They advanced to the semifinals of the CAA women's tournament, where they lost to Drexel. They received an at-large bid to the WNIT, where they lost to Butler in the first round.

== Roster ==
2018–19 Northeastern Huskies women's basketball team
Players
Coaches

Pos.	#	Name	Height	Year	Previous school	Hometown
G	0	Te'Erica Eason	5 ft 8 in (1.73 m)	Sr	The Lovett School	Atlanta, GA
G	1	Kendall Currence	5 ft 7 in (1.7 m)	Fr	Falmouth Academy	Bourne, MA
G	3	Zoe Zwerling	5 ft 8 in (1.73 m)	Sr	Henry M. Gunn	Palo Alto, CA
F	4	Alexis Hill	5 ft 11 in (1.8 m)	Fr	Lebanon Catholic	Lebanon, PA
G	11	Stella Clark	5 ft 4 in (1.63 m)	So	Manasquan	Sea Girt, NJ
G	12	Ayanna Dublin	5 ft 10 in (1.78 m)	Jr	Grace Church School	Brooklyn, NY
G	13	Katie May	5 ft 11 in (1.8 m)	Fr	Archbishop Wood	Rydal, PA
G	14	Shannon Todd	5 ft 10 in (1.78 m)	Jr	York	York, ME
G	20	Jess Genco	5 ft 5 in (1.65 m)	Sr	Scranton Prep	Scranton, PA
F	21	Samantha Michel	6 ft 0 in (1.83 m)	So	Apex	Apex, NC
F	23	Courtney Redcross	6 ft 0 in (1.83 m)	Jr	The Shipley School	West Chester, PA
F	24	Gabriella Giacone	6 ft 0 in (1.83 m)	Sr	Bethlehem Central	Delmar, NY
F	25	Jasmine Braswell	6 ft 2 in (1.88 m)	RS So	Broad Run	Ashburn, VA
F	32	Maureen Taggart	5 ft 11 in (1.8 m)	Sr	Tilton School	Wallingford, VT
F	42	Rachel Aho	6 ft 3 in (1.91 m)	RS Jr	Marianapolis Prep; Providence	Holden, MA

Head coach

- Kelly Cole (Northwestern)

Assistant coach(es)

- Whitney Edwards (New Hampshire)
- Mandy Pennewell (Quinnipiac)
- Ashley Robinson (Saint Joseph's)

Legend

- (C) Team captain
- (S) Suspended
- (I) Ineligible
- (W) Walk-on
- Injured
- Current redshirt

Roster

== Schedule ==
Date time, TV	Rank^{#}	Opponent^{#}	Result	Record	Site (attendance) city, state
Non-conference regular season
Nov 9, 2018*; 12:00 pm, NESN		Boston University	W 81–51	1–0	Cabot Center (942); Boston, MA
Nov 11, 2018*; 1:00 pm, NESN		Fordham	W 58–54	2–0	Cabot Center (325); Boston, MA
Nov 17, 2018*; 2:00 pm, ESPN+		at Dayton	W 84–79 ^{OT}	3–0	UD Arena (1,243); Dayton, OH
Nov 21, 2018*; 12:00 pm, NESN		New Hampshire	W 69–54	4–0	Cabot Center (234); Boston, MA
Nov 24, 2018*; 1:00 pm		Air Force	W 54–41	5–0	Cabot Center (255); Boston, MA
Nov 28, 2018*; 7:00 pm		at Florida	W 79–66	6–0	O'Connell Center (1,161); Gainesville, FL
Dec 2, 2018*; 1:00 pm, NESN		Massachusetts	W 53–52	7–0	Cabot Center (279); Boston, MA
Dec 5, 2018*; 7:00 pm, ESPN+		at Fairfield	W 59–50	8–0	Alumni Hall (486); Fairfield, CT
Dec 15, 2018*; 1:00 pm		at Providence	W 65–59	9–0	Alumni Hall (282); Providence, RI
Dec 18, 2018*; 7:00 pm, ESPN+		at Marist	L 84–90	9–1	McCann Arena (1,233); Poughkeepsie, NY
Dec 22, 2018*; 12:00 pm		Maine	W 63–55	10–1	Cabot Center (337); Boston, MA
CAA regular season
Jan 4, 2019; 7:00 pm, NESN+		Elon	W 79–71	11–1 (1–0)	Cabot Center (436); Boston, MA
Jan 6, 2019; 2:00 pm, NESN		William & Mary	W 88–74	12–1 (2–0)	Cabot Center (540); Boston, MA
Jan 11, 2019; 7:00 pm		at Towson	L 83–88	12–2 (2–1)	SECU Arena (632); Towson, MD
Jan 13, 2019; 2:00 pm		at James Madison	L 49–84	12–3 (2–2)	JMU Convocation Center (1,840); Harrisonburg, VA
Jan 18, 2019; 7:00 pm, NESN+		Drexel	L 59–61	12–4 (2–3)	Cabot Center (391); Boston, MA
Jan 20, 2019; 1:00 pm, NESN		Delaware	W 75–62	13–4 (3–3)	Cabot Center (365); Boston, MA
Jan 27, 2019; 2:00 pm		at Hofstra	L 61–78	13–5 (3–4)	Hofstra Arena (374); Hempstead, NY
Feb 1, 2019; 6:30 pm		at College of Charleston	W 87–56	14–5 (4–4)	TD Arena (289); Charleston, SC
Feb 3, 2019; 1:00 pm		at UNC Wilmington	L 70–83	14–6 (4–5)	Trask Coliseum (634); Wilmington, NC
Feb 8, 2019; 7:00 pm		James Madison	L 51–58	14–7 (4–6)	Cabot Center (495); Boston, MA
Feb 10, 2019; 2:00 pm, NESN+		Towson	W 77–68	15–7 (5–6)	Cabot Center (357); Boston, MA
Feb 15, 2019; 7:00 pm		at Delaware	L 63–77	15–8 (5–7)	Bob Carpenter Center (1,478); Newark, DE
Feb 17, 2019; 2:00 pm		at Drexel	L 45–76	15–9 (5–8)	Daskalakis Athletic Center (1,074); Philadelphia, PA
Feb 24, 2019; 2:00 pm		Hofstra	L 62–63	15–10 (5–9)	Cabot Center (260); Boston, MA
Mar 1, 2019; 7:00 pm		UNC Wilmington	W 83–54	16–10 (6–9)	Cabot Center (253); Boston, MA
Mar 3, 2019; 1:00 pm		College of Charleston	W 81–69	17–10 (7–9)	Cabot Center (292); Boston, MA
Mar 7, 2019; 7:00 pm		at William & Mary	W 75–71	18–10 (8–9)	Kaplan Arena (515); Williamsburg, VA
Mar 9, 2019; 2:00 pm		at Elon	W 83–57	19–10 (9–9)	Schar Center (402); Elon, NC
CAA Women's Tournament
Mar 14, 2019; 7:30 pm, CAA.tv	(6)	vs. (3) UNC Wilmington; Quarterfinals	W 75–64	20–10	Bob Carpenter Center; Newark, DE
Mar 15, 2019; 4:00 pm, CAA.tv	(6)	vs. (2) Drexel; Semifinals	L 69–73 ^{OT}	20–11	Bob Carpenter Center (442); Newark, DE
WNIT
Mar 21, 2019*; 7:00 pm		at Butler; First Round	L 72–89	20–12	Hinkle Fieldhouse (437); Indianapolis, IN
*Non-conference game. ^{#}Rankings from AP Poll. (#) Tournament seedings in parentheses. All times are in Eastern Time.

== See also ==
- 2018–19 Northeastern Huskies men's basketball team
