= 2018–19 Hofstra Pride women's basketball team =

Intercollegiate basketball season

2018–19 Hofstra Pride women's basketball
- Conference: Colonial Athletic Association
- Record: 11–22 (3–15 CAA)
- Head coach: Krista Kilburn-Steveskey (13th season)
- Assistant coaches: Faisal Khan; Messiah Reames; Darius Faulk
- Home arena: Hofstra Arena

2018–19 CAA women's basketball standings
	Conf.				Overall
Team	W		L	PCT	W		L	PCT
James Madison	17	–	1	.944	29	–	6	.829
Drexel	14	–	4	.778	24	–	9	.727
Towson †	11	–	7	.611	20	–	13	.606
Delaware	11	–	7	.611	16	–	15	.516
UNC Wilmington	11	–	7	.611	18	–	12	.600
Northeastern	9	–	9	.500	20	–	12	.625
William & Mary	7	–	11	.389	14	–	17	.452
Elon	4	–	14	.222	9	–	21	.300
Hofstra	3	–	15	.167	11	–	22	.333
Charleston	3	–	15	.167	7	–	23	.233
† 2019 CAA tournament winner As of March 31, 2019; Rankings from AP poll

The 2018–19 Hofstra Pride women's basketball team represented Hofstra University during the 2018–19 NCAA Division I women's basketball season. The Pride, led by 13th-year head coach Krista Kilburn-Steveskey, played their home games at Hofstra Arena in Hempstead, New York and were members of the Colonial Athletic Association (CAA).

The Pride finished the season 11–22, 3–15 in CAA play, to finish in a tie for last place. They advanced to the quarterfinals of the CAA women's tournament, where they defeated eighth seed Elon in the first round and upset first seed James Madison before falling to fourth seed Towson in the semifinals.

On March 26, Kilburn-Steveskey announced her resignation from Hofstra after thirteen seasons, leaving with the program's most wins as head coach (211).

== Roster ==
2017–18 Hofstra Pride women's basketball team
Players
Coaches

Pos.	#	Name	Height	Year	Previous school	Hometown
F	00	Caria Reynolds	5 ft 11 in (1.8 m)	Fr	Greater Atlanta Christian	Stone Mountain, GA
G	1	E'Lexus Davis	5 ft 7 in (1.7 m)	Jr	National Christian Academy	Hyattsville, MD
G	2	JaKayla Brown	5 ft 10 in (1.78 m)	Fr	St. Mary's Ryken	La Plata, MD
G/F	4	Shawn Mills	5 ft 9 in (1.75 m)	Fr	Bishop O'Connell	Sterling, VA
G	5	Petja Krupenko	5 ft 8 in (1.73 m)	Jr	Gimnazija Bezigrad	Ljubljana, Slovenia
G	10	Ana Hernandez Gil	5 ft 8 in (1.73 m)	Jr	San Antonio Maria Claret	Las Palmas de Gran Canaria, Canary Islands
F	11	Jaylen Hines	5 ft 10 in (1.78 m)	So	Elizabeth Seton	Clinton, MD
F	12	Mie Hoff	6 ft 0 in (1.83 m)	So	Stend Videreående Skole	Bergen, Norway
F	21	Mikiyah Croskey	6 ft 1 in (1.85 m)	Jr	National Christian Academy	Bowie, MD
G	23	Vanerlie Valcourt	5 ft 10 in (1.78 m)	Fr	The Mary Louis Academy	Queens, NY
G	24	Sica Cuzic	5 ft 10 in (1.78 m)	Sr	Trinity International; Salt Lake CC	Galați, Romania
G/F	33	Bri Crutchfield	6 ft 0 in (1.83 m)	Fr	Middletown	Frederick, MD
G	34	Boogie Brozoski	5 ft 6 in (1.68 m)	Sr	Long Island Lutheran; Michigan	Cambria Heights, N Y
F	53	Marianne Kalin	6 ft 1 in (1.85 m)	Jr	Kimpisen Lukio	Lappeenranta, Finland
G	54	Sandra Karsten	5 ft 9 in (1.75 m)	Jr	Mäkelänrinteen Lukio	Helsinki, Finland

Head coach

- Krista Kilburn-Steveskey (NC State)

Assistant coach(es)

- Faisal Khan (UMBC)
- Messiah Reames (Cabrini)
- Darius Faulk (Hofstra)

Legend

- (C) Team captain
- (S) Suspended
- (I) Ineligible
- (W) Walk-on
- Injured
- Current redshirt

Roster
Last update: October 9, 2025

== Schedule ==
Date time, TV	Rank^{#}	Opponent^{#}	Result	Record	Site (attendance) city, state
Non-conference regular season
November 6, 2018*; 7:00 p.m.		Iona	W 74–49	1–0	Hofstra Arena (406); Hempstead, NY
November 9, 2018*; 5:00 p.m.		Columbia	L 63–65	1–1	Hofstra Arena (4,645); Hempstead, NY
November 13, 2018*; 7:00 p.m.		at Stony Brook	L 49–77	1–2	Island Federal Credit Union Arena (397); Stony Brook, NY
November 17, 2018*; 2:00 p.m., ESPN+		at St. Bonaventure	W 67–59	2–2	Reilly Center (705); Olean, NY
November 23, 2018*; 3:30 p.m.		vs. Wright State; Challenge in Music City Broadwalk Bracket	L 63–94	2–3	Nashville Municipal Auditorium (750); Nashville, TN
November 24, 2018*; 3:30 p.m.		vs. Marist; Challenge in Music City Broadwalk Bracket	L 57–71	2–4	Nashville Municipal Auditorium (750); Nashville, TN
November 25, 2018*; 1:00 p.m.		vs. Stetson; Challenge in Music City Broadwalk Bracket	W 53–50	3–4	Nashville Municipal Auditorium (750); Nashville, TN
November 29, 2018*; 7:00 p.m.		Sacred Heart	W 53–50	3–5	Hofstra Arena (356); Hempstead, NY
December 5, 2018*; 6:05 p.m.		at Holy Cross	L 66–72 ^{OT}	3–6	Hart Center (693); Worcester, MA
December 9, 2018*; 1:00 p.m., ESPN+		at UMBC	W 45–42	4–6	UMBC Event Center (339); Catonsville, MD
December 21, 2018*; 7:00 p.m.		at Siena	W 57–50	5–6	Alumni Recreation Center (456); Loudonville, NY
December 29, 2018*; 1:00 p.m.		Wilmington (DE)	W 77–56	6–6	Hofstra Arena (365); Hempstead, NY
CAA regular season
January 4, 2019; 7:00 p.m.		William & Mary	L 55–60	6–7 (0–1)	Hofstra Arena (323); Hempstead, NY
January 6, 2019; 1:00 p.m.		Elon	L 64–77	6–8 (0–2)	Hofstra Arena (375); Hempstead, NY
January 11, 2019; 7:00 p.m.		at James Madison	L 54–77	6–9 (0–3)	JMU Convocation Center (1,922); Harrisonburg, VA
January 13, 2019; 2:00 p.m.		at Towson	L 68–92	6–10 (0–4)	SECU Arena (208); Towson, MD
January 18, 2019; 11:30 a.m.		Delaware	L 59–78	6–11 (0–5)	Hofstra Arena (2,393); Hempstead, NY
January 20, 2019; 2:00 p.m.		Drexel	L 49–61	6–12 (0–6)	Hofstra Arena (148); Hempstead, NY
January 27, 2019; 2:00 p.m.		Northeastern	W 78–61	7–12 (1–6)	Hofstra Arena (374); Hempstead, NY
February 1, 2019; 7:00 p.m.		at UNC Wilmington	L 54–89	7–13 (1–7)	Trask Coliseum (788); Wilmington, NC
February 3, 2019; 1:00 p.m.		at College of Charleston	L 62–70	7–14 (1–8)	TD Arena (218); Charleston, SC
February 8, 2019; 7:00 p.m.		Towson	L 56–68	7–15 (1–9)	Hofstra Arena (405); Hempstead, NY
February 10, 2019; 2:00 p.m.		James Madison	L 44–59	7–16 (1–10)	Hofstra Arena (1,022); Hempstead, NY
February 15, 2019; 7:00 p.m.		at Drexel	L 38–62	7–17 (1–11)	Daskalakis Athletic Center (684); Philadelphia, PA
February 17, 2019; 2:00 p.m.		at Delaware	L 47–57	7–18 (1–12)	Bob Carpenter Center (1,171); Newark, DE
February 24, 2019; 2:00 p.m.		at Northeastern	W 63–62	8–18 (2–12)	Cabot Center (260); Boston, MA
March 1, 2019; 7:00 p.m.		College of Charleston	W 68–49	9–18 (3–12)	Hofstra Arena (292); Hempstead, NY
March 3, 2019; 1:00 p.m.		UNC Wilmington	L 51–61	9–19 (3–13)	Hofstra Arena (462); Hempstead, NY
March 7, 2019; 7:00 p.m.		Elon	L 52–55	9–20 (3–14)	Schar Center (336); Elon, NC
March 9, 2019; 2:00 p.m.		at William & Mary	L 72–83	9–21 (3–15)	Kaplan Arena (609); Williamsburg, VA
CAA women's tournament
March 13, 2019; 12:00 p.m., CAA.tv	(9)	vs. (8) Elon; First round	W 77–75	10–21	Bob Carpenter Center; Newark, DE
March 14, 2019; 12:00 p.m., CAA.tv	(9)	vs. (1) James Madison; Quarterfinals	W 57–50	11–21	Bob Carpenter Center; Newark, DE
March 15, 2019; 2:00 p.m., CAA.tv	(9)	vs. (4) Towson; Semifinals	L 48–69	11–22	Bob Carpenter Center; Newark, DE
*Non-conference game. ^{#}Rankings from AP poll. (#) Tournament seedings in parentheses. All times are in Eastern.

== See also ==
- 2018–19 Hofstra Pride men's basketball team
