= 2018–19 Delaware Fightin' Blue Hens women's basketball team =

Intercollegiate basketball season

2018–19 Delaware Fightin' Blue Hens women's basketball
- Conference: Colonial Athletic Association
- Record: 16–15 (11–7 CAA)
- Head coach: Natasha Adair (2nd season)
- Assistant coaches: Bob Clark; Sarah Jenkins; Mykala Walker
- Home arena: Bob Carpenter Center

2018–19 CAA women's basketball standings
	Conf.				Overall
Team	W		L	PCT	W		L	PCT
James Madison	17	–	1	.944	29	–	6	.829
Drexel	14	–	4	.778	24	–	9	.727
Towson †	11	–	7	.611	20	–	13	.606
Delaware	11	–	7	.611	16	–	15	.516
UNC Wilmington	11	–	7	.611	18	–	12	.600
Northeastern	9	–	9	.500	20	–	12	.625
William & Mary	7	–	11	.389	14	–	17	.452
Elon	4	–	14	.222	9	–	21	.300
Hofstra	3	–	15	.167	11	–	22	.333
Charleston	3	–	15	.167	7	–	23	.233
† 2019 CAA tournament winner As of March 31, 2019; Rankings from AP poll

The 2018–19 Delaware Fightin' Blue Hens women's basketball team represented the University of Delaware during the 2018–19 NCAA Division I women's basketball season. The Fightin' Blue Hens, led by second-year head coach Natasha Adair, played their home games at the Bob Carpenter Center in Newark, Delaware and were members of the Colonial Athletic Association (CAA). They finished the season 16–15, 11–7 CAA play, to finish in a three-way tie for third place. They lost in the quarterfinals of the CAA women's tournament to Towson.

== Roster ==
2018–19 Delaware Fightin' Blue Hens women's basketball team
Players
Coaches

Pos.	#	Name	Height	Year	Previous school	Hometown
G/F	0	Gadson Lefft	6 ft 1 in (1.85 m)	RS Sr	Heathwood Hall/Phillips Academy; Clemson	Lake Wylie, SC
G/F	1	Lolo Daveport (redshirt)	6 ft 1 in (1.85 m)	Fr	Plano Senior	Plano, TX
G	2	Abby Gonzales	5 ft 7 in (1.7 m)	Jr	North Allegheny	Wexford, PA
G	4	Paris McBride	5 ft 4 in (1.63 m)	Fr	Woodbridge	Woodbridge, VA
F	5	Makeda Nicholas	6 ft 1 in (1.85 m)	RS Sr	North Babylon	North Babylon, NY
F	12	Lizzie Oleary	6 ft 2 in (1.88 m)	So	Abington Senior	Willow Grove, PA
G/F	20	Jasmine Dickey	5 ft 10 in (1.78 m)	Fr	Catonsville	Baltimore, MD
F	22	Samone DeFreese	5 ft 11 in (1.8 m)	Jr	Berkshire	Bergenfield, NJ
G	23	Bailey Kargo	5 ft 10 in (1.78 m)	Jr	Walter Hines Page	Greensboro, NC
F	25	Rebecca Lawrence	6 ft 3 in (1.91 m)	Jr	Walter Hines Page	Ridgefield, CT
G	30	Kayla Shaw (redshirt)	5 ft 10 in (1.78 m)	Jr	Chaparral; Monmouth	Scottsdale, AZ
F	33	Nicole Enabosi	6 ft 0 in (1.83 m)	Sr	Our Lady of Good Counsel	Gaithersburg, MD
G	35	Alison Lewis	5 ft 9 in (1.75 m)	RS Sr	Sanford School; Providence	Kennett Square, PA
F/C	44	Erin Antosh	6 ft 3 in (1.91 m)	So	Lawrence Academy	Townsend, MA

Head coach

- Natasha Adair (South Florida)

Assistant coach(es)

- Bob Clark (Towson)
- Sarah Jenkins (Georgetown)
- Mykala Walker (Wake Forest)

Legend

- (C) Team captain
- (S) Suspended
- (I) Ineligible
- (W) Walk-on
- Injured
- Current redshirt

Roster
Last update: March 10, 2025

== Schedule ==
Date time, TV	Rank^{#}	Opponent^{#}	Result	Record	Site (attendance) city, state
Non-conference regular season
November 9, 2018*; 9:30 p.m.		at Northern Iowa; Preseason WNIT first round	L 67–79	0–1	McLeod Center (1,295); Cedar Falls, IA
November 16, 2018*; 5:00 p.m.		vs. Montana State; Preseason WNIT consolation round	L 60–69	0–2	Strahan Arena (150); San Marcos, TX
November 17, 2018*; 5:00 p.m.		vs. Nicholls; Preseason WNIT consolation round	W 71–56	1–2	Strahan Arena (532); San Marcos, TX
November 20, 2018*; 6:00 p.m.		at Delaware State	W 85–77	2–2	Memorial Hall (153); Dover, DE
November 23, 2018*; 2:30 p.m.		vs. Bradley; FAU Thanksgiving Tournament semifinals	L 47–59	2–3	FAU Arena (472); Boca Raton, FL
November 24, 2018*; 12:00 p.m.		vs. Lafayette; FAU Thanksgiving Tournament 3rd-place game	W 65–47	3–3	FAU Arena (415); Boca Raton, FL
December 1, 2018*; 1:00 p.m.		at Boston University	L 61–72	3–4	Case Gym (362); Boston, MA
December 6, 2018*; 7:00 p.m., ESPN+		at George Mason	L 46–72	3–5	EagleBank Arena (616); Fairfax, VA
December 9, 2018*; 5:00 p.m.		UCF	L 60–71	3–6	Bob Carpenter Center (1,043); Newark, DE
December 18, 2018*; 7:00 p.m.		Gardner–Webb	W 69–45	4–6	Bob Carpenter Center (869); Newark, DE
December 20, 2018*; 3:00 p.m.		No. 5 Maryland	L 53–77	4–7	Bob Carpenter Center (1,423); Newark, DE
December 28, 2018*; 7:00 p.m.		Saint Joseph's	W 48–39	5–7	Bob Carpenter Center (1,368); Newark, DE
CAA regular season
January 4, 2019; 7:00 p.m., NBCSPHI		James Madison	L 43–68	5–8 (0–1)	Bob Carpenter Center (1,172); Newark, DE
January 6, 2019; 2:00 p.m.		Towson	L 48–56	5–9 (0–2)	Bob Carpenter Center (1,225); Newark, DE
January 13, 2019; 2:00 p.m., NBCSPHI		Drexel	L 40–57	5–10 (0–3)	Bob Carpenter Center (1,156); Newark, DE
January 18, 2019; 11:30 a.m.		at Hofstra	W 78–59	6–10 (1–3)	Hofstra Arena (2,393); Hempstead, NY
January 20, 2019; 2:00 p.m.		at Northeastern	L 65–72	6–11 (1–4)	Case Gym (365); Boston, MA
January 25, 2019; 12:00 p.m.		UNC Wilmington	W 65–53	7–11 (2–4)	Bob Carpenter Center (1,633); Newark, DE
January 27, 2019; 1:00 p.m.		College of Charleston	W 74–50	8–11 (3–4)	Bob Carpenter Center (1,212); Newark, DE
February 1, 2019; 7:00 p.m.		at William & Mary	W 70–59	9–11 (4–4)	Kaplan Arena (634); Williamsburg, VA
February 3, 2019; 2:00 p.m.		at Elon	W 74–63	10–11 (5–4)	Schar Center (416); Elon, NC
February 10, 2019; 5:00 p.m., NBCSPHI		at Drexel	L 41–58	10–12 (5–5)	Daskalakis Athletic Center (821); Philadelphia, PA
February 15, 2019; 7:00 p.m.		Northeastern	W 77–63	11–12 (6–5)	Bob Carpenter Center (1,478); Newark, DE
February 17, 2019; 2:00 p.m.		Hofstra	W 57–47	12–12 (7–5)	Bob Carpenter Center (1,171); Newark, DE
February 22, 2019; 6:30 p.m.		at College of Charleston	W 72–60	13–12 (8–5)	TD Arena (341); Charleston, SC
February 24, 2019; 2:00 p.m.		at UNC Wilmington	L 64–72	13–13 (8–6)	Trask Coliseum (726); Wilmington, NC
March 1, 2019; 7:00 p.m.		Elon	W 71–59	14–13 (9–6)	Bob Carpenter Center (1,795); Newark, DE
March 3, 2019; 2:00 p.m.		William & Mary	W 68–52	15–13 (10–6)	Bob Carpenter Center (2,281); Newark, DE
March 7, 2019; 2:00 p.m.		at Towson	W 70–57	16–13 (11–6)	SECU Arena (411); Towson, MD
March 9, 2019; 2:00 p.m.		at James Madison	L 51–56	16–14 (11–7)	JMU Convocation Center (3,091); Harrisonburg, VA
CAA women's tournament
March 14, 2019; 2:30 p.m., CAA.tv	(5)	vs. (4) Towson; Quarterfinals	L 49–59	16–15	Bob Carpenter Center; Newark, DE
*Non-conference game. ^{#}Rankings from AP poll. (#) Tournament seedings in parentheses. All times are in Eastern.

== See also ==
- 2018–19 Delaware Fightin' Blue Hens men's basketball team
