= 2018–19 Clemson Tigers women's basketball team =

Women's college basketball season

2018–19 Clemson Tigers women's basketball
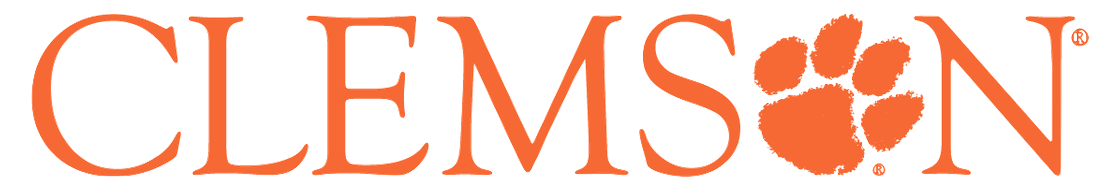

NCAA tournament, second round
- Conference: Atlantic Coast Conference
- Record: 20–13 (9–7 ACC)
- Head coach: Amanda Butler (1st season)
- Assistant coaches: Shimmy Grey-Miller (1st season); Joy Cheek (1st season); Daniel Barber (1st season)
- Home arena: Littlejohn Coliseum

2018–19 ACC women's basketball standings
	Conf.				Overall
Team	W		L	PCT	W		L	PCT
No. 3 Notre Dame†	14	–	2	.875	35	–	4	.897
No. 5 Louisville	14	–	2	.875	32	–	4	.889
No. 10 NC State	12	–	4	.750	28	–	6	.824
No. 19 Miami (FL)	12	–	4	.750	25	–	9	.735
No. 12 Syracuse	11	–	5	.688	25	–	9	.735
No. 25 Florida State	10	–	6	.625	24	–	9	.727
Clemson	9	–	7	.563	20	–	13	.606
North Carolina	8	–	8	.500	18	–	15	.545
Georgia Tech	7	–	9	.438	17	–	13	.567
Virginia Tech	6	–	10	.375	22	–	12	.647
Duke	6	–	10	.375	15	–	15	.500
Virginia	5	–	11	.313	12	–	19	.387
Boston College	3	–	13	.188	14	–	16	.467
Pittsburgh	2	–	14	.125	11	–	20	.355
Wake Forest	1	–	15	.063	10	–	20	.333
† 2019 ACC tournament winner As of March 7, 2019; Rankings from AP poll

The 2018–19 Clemson Tigers women's basketball team represented Clemson University during the 2018–19 college basketball season. They were led by first-year head coach Amanda Butler. The Tigers, members of the Atlantic Coast Conference, played their home games at Littlejohn Coliseum. They finished the season 20–13, 9–7 in ACC play to finish in seventh place. They advanced to the quarterfinals of the ACC women's tournament, where they lost to Louisville. They received an at-large bid to the NCAA women's tournament, which was their first trip since 2002. They defeated South Dakota in the first round before losing to Mississippi State in the second round.

During the off-season it was announced that Amanda Butler would be taking over as head coach for Audra Smith.

== Previous season ==
The Tigers finished the 2017–18 season 11–19, 1–15 in ACC play to finish in fifteenth place. They lost to Georgia Tech in the first round of the ACC tournament. After this season, head coach Audra Smith was fired.

== Offseason ==
=== 2018 recruiting class ===
College recruiting
Name	Hometown	School	Height	Weight	Commit date
Skylar Blackstock; G	Mount Pleasant, SC	Wando	5 ft 10 in (1.78 m)	N/A	Verbal
Skylar Blackstock; G	Recruit ratings: ESPN: (88)				
Overall recruit ranking:
Note: In many cases, Scout, Rivals, 247Sports, On3, and ESPN may conflict in their listings of height and weight.; In these cases, the average was taken. ESPN grades are on a 100-point scale.; Sources:

== Roster ==
2018–19 Clemson Tigers women's basketball team
Players
Coaches

Pos.	#	Name	Height	Year	Previous school	Hometown
G	1	Destiny Thomas	5 ft 10 in (1.78 m)	So	Pelham	Pelham, GA
G	3	Kendall Spray	5 ft 5 in (1.65 m)	Jr	Wilson Central; UT Martin	Nashville, TN
G	5	Danielle Edwards	5 ft 7 in (1.7 m)	Sr	McDonogh School	Perry Hall, MD
G	10	Camreé Clegg	5 ft 5 in (1.65 m)	Fr	Wayne Memorial	Westland, MI
G	11	Taylor Hosendove	6 ft 1 in (1.85 m)	Fr	Westlake	Atlanta, GA
G	12	Aliyah Collier	5 ft 9 in (1.75 m)	Sr	Laney	Augusta, GA
G	20	Simone Westbrook	5 ft 8 in (1.73 m)	GS	Chandler; Florida	Chandler, AZ
G	21	Skylar Blackstock	5 ft 11 in (1.8 m)	Fr	Wando	Charleston, SC
G	22	Keniece Purvis	5 ft 7 in (1.7 m)	RS Sr	New Garden Friends School	Greensboro, NC
F	24	Mikayla Hayes	6 ft 3 in (1.91 m)	So	Park Center; Florida	Minneapolis, MN
F	32	Chyna Cotton	5 ft 10 in (1.78 m)	Jr	Southwest Atlanta Christian	Monroe, GA
C	44	Kobi Thornton	6 ft 2 in (1.88 m)	Jr	Randolph-Clay	Cuthbert, GA
C	55	Tylar Bennett	6 ft 4 in (1.93 m)	So	Detroit Country Day	Redford, MI

Head coach

- Amanda Butler (Florida)

Assistant coach(es)

- Shimmy Gray–Miller (Michigan)
- Joy Cheek (Duke)
- Daniel Barber (Florida)

Legend

- (C) Team captain
- (S) Suspended
- (I) Ineligible
- (W) Walk-on
- Injured
- Current redshirt

Roster
Last update: October 18, 2018

== Schedule ==
Date time, TV	Rank^{#}	Opponent^{#}	Result	Record	High points	High rebounds	High assists	Site (attendance) city, state
Exhibition
October 28, 2018*; 2:00 pm		Lander	W 84–53		17 – Collier	12 – Bennett	4 – Edwards	Littlejohn Coliseum (407); Clemson, SC
November 2, 2018*; 5:00 pm		Wingate	W 80–48		14 – Hosendove	7 – Thornton	4 – Westbrook	Littlejohn Coliseum; Clemson, SC
Non-conference regular season
November 8, 2018*; 7:00 pm, ACCN Extra		Wofford	W 85–77	1–0	25 – Thornton	12 – Thornton	3 – Tied	Littlejohn Coliseum (764); Clemson, SC
November 11, 2018*; 2:00 pm, ACCN Extra		Lipscomb	W 68–26	2–0	18 – Thornton	11 – Bennett	4 – Tied	Littlejohn Coliseum (809); Clemson, SC
November 15, 2018*; 6:30 pm, SECN		at No. 10 South Carolina; Rivalry	L 57–69	2–1	14 – Westbrook	7 – Tied	3 – Edwards	Colonial Life Arena (11,539); Columbia, SC
November 19, 2018*; 8:00 pm, SECN		at Alabama	L 56–76	2–2	15 – Bennett	10 – Collier	5 – Edwards	Coleman Coliseum (2,147); Tuscaloosa, AL
November 22, 2018*; 3:00 pm		vs. No. 11 Tennessee; Junkanoo Jam Junkanoo Division semifinals	L 66–78	2–3	14 – Jackson	8 – Green	5 – Westbrook	Gateway Christian Academy (320); Bimini, Bahamas
November 23, 2018*; 7:45 pm		vs. Oklahoma; Junkanoo Jam Junkanoo Division 3rd place game	W 74–62	3–3	24 – Edwards	10 – Thornton	3 – Tied	Gateway Christian Academy; Bimini, Bahamas
November 28, 2018*; 7:00 pm, ACCN Extra		Illinois; ACC–Big Ten Women's Challenge	W 69–67 ^{OT}	4–3	23 – Thornton	17 – Bennett	6 – Edwards	Littlejohn Coliseum (412); Clemson, SC
December 2, 2018*; 2:00 pm, ACCN Extra		Belmont	W 65–62	5–3	17 – Edwards	11 – Bennett	6 – Edwards	Littlejohn Coliseum (561); Clemson, SC
December 5, 2018*; 7:00 pm, ACCN Extra		High Point	W 83–64	6–3	21 – Thornton	12 – Bennett	5 – Westbrook	Littlejohn Coliseum (564); Clemson, SC
December 8, 2018*; 2:00 pm, ACCN Extra		Rhode Island	W 80–67	7–3	23 – Thornton	7 – Thornton	8 – Westbrook	Littlejohn Coliseum (573); Clemson, SC
December 16, 2018*; 2:00 pm, ACCN Extra		Davidson	L 80–90	7–4	30 – Westbrook	8 – Thornton	5 – Westbrook	Littlejohn Coliseum (590); Clemson, SC
December 18, 2018*; 12:00 pm, ACCN Extra		Marshall	W 68–54	8–4	18 – Thornton	10 – Bennett	6 – Westbrook	Littlejohn Coliseum (3,627); Clemson, SC
December 21, 2018*; 7:00 pm, ACCN Extra		Appalachian State	W 87–48	9–4	20 – Edwards	6 – Thornton	6 – Tied	Littlejohn Coliseum (722); Clemson, SC
ACC regular season
January 3, 2019; 7:00 pm, ACCN Extra		No. 14 Syracuse	L 75–84	9–5 (0–1)	24 – Edwards	12 – Thornton	5 – Westbrook	Littlejohn Coliseum (781); Clemson, SC
January 6, 2019; 2:00 pm, ACCN Extra		Virginia	W 71–65	10–5 (1–1)	21 – Westbrook	7 – Tied	3 – Edwards	Littlejohn Coliseum (1,056); Clemson, SC
January 10, 2019; 11:00 am, ACCN Extra		at Miami (FL)	W 76–67	11–5 (2–1)	23 – Westbrook	9 – Thornton	3 – 3 tied	Watsco Center (2,490); Coral Gables, FL
January 13, 2019; 2:00 pm, ACCN Extra		at No. 22 Florida State	W 57–45	12–5 (3–1)	19 – Thornton	10 – Thornton	2 – 4 tied	Tucker Center (3,317); Tallahassee, FL
January 17, 2019; 7:00 pm, ACCN Extra		Georgia Tech	W 71–61	13–5 (4–1)	19 – Thornton	10 – Thornton	6 – Westbrook	Littlejohn Coliseum (675); Clemson, SC
January 20, 2019; 2:00 pm, ACCN Extra		at Pittsburgh	W 65–59	14–5 (5–1)	18 – Collier	7 – 3 tied	4 – Edwards	Petersen Events Center (940); Pittsburgh, PA
January 24, 2019; 7:00 pm, ACCN Extra		at No. 8 NC State	L 51–54	14–6 (5–2)	18 – Westbrook	13 – Collier	3 – Edwards	Reynolds Coliseum (2,783); Raleigh, NC
January 31, 2019; 7:00 pm, ACCN Extra		No. 5 Notre Dame	L 63–101	14–7 (5–3)	21 – Collier	8 – Collier	4 – Westbrook	Littlejohn Coliseum (2,791); Clemson, SC
February 2, 2019; 2:00 pm, ACCN Extra		No. 3 Louisville	L 44–76	14–8 (5–4)	9 – Thornton	13 – Collier	5 – Westbrook	Littlejohn Coliseum (1,537); Clemson, SC
February 7, 2019; 7:00 pm, RSN		at Wake Forest	W 69–53	15–8 (6–4)	18 – Collier	14 – Collier	4 – Edwards	LJVM Coliseum (527); Winston–Salem, NC
February 10, 2019; 2:00 pm, ACCN Extra		North Carolina	L 64–70	15–9 (6–5)	26 – Edwards	10 – Bennett	6 – Westbrook	Littlejohn Coliseum (2,224); Clemson, SC
February 14, 2019; 7:00 pm, ACCN Extra		No. 21 Florida State	W 73–68	16–9 (7–5)	19 – Thornton	6 – Collier	5 – Westbrook	Littlejohn Coliseum (658); Clemson, SC
February 16, 2019; 1:00 pm, ACCN Extra		at Boston College	W 91–58	17–9 (8–5)	18 – Clegg	11 – Thornton	4 – Westbrook	Conte Forum (1,932); Chestnut Hill, MA
February 21, 2019; 7:00 pm, ACCN Extra		at Georgia Tech	L 53–75	17–10 (8–6)	11 – Tied	6 – Tied	4 – Edwards	McCamish Pavilion (1,119); Atlanta, GA
February 24, 2019; 1:00 pm, RSN		Virginia Tech	W 73–66	18–10 (9–6)	23 – Thornton	10 – Thornton	9 – Edwards	Littlejohn Coliseum (1,264); Clemson, SC
February 28, 2019; 7:00 pm, ACCN Extra		at Duke	L 59–63	18–11 (9–7)	20 – Tied	7 – Tied	4 – Westbrook	Cameron Indoor Stadium (3,149); Durham, NC
ACC Women's Tournament
March 7, 2019; 6:00 pm, ACCN	(7)	vs. (10) Virginia Tech; Second Round	W 80–79 ^{OT}	19–11	28 – Collier	10 – Collier	8 – Edwards	Greensboro Coliseum (4,024); Greensboro, NC
March 8, 2019; 6:00 pm, ACCN	(7)	vs. (2) No. 3 Louisville; Quarterfinals	L 67–75	19–12	17 – Tied	8 – Tied	3 – Tied	Greensboro Coliseum (5,646); Greensboro, NC
NCAA Women's Tournament
March 22, 2019*; 7:00 pm, ESPN2	(9 P)	vs. (8 P) South Dakota; First Round	W 79–66	20–12	27 – Westbrook	8 – Edwards	3 – Collier	Humphrey Coliseum; Starkville, MS
March 24, 2019*; 9:00 pm, ESPN	(9 P)	at (1 P) No. 4 Mississippi State; Second Round	L 61–85	20–13	14 – Tied	8 – Thornton	5 – Westbrook	Humphrey Coliseum (9,944); Starkville, MS
*Non-conference game. ^{#}Rankings from AP Poll. (#) Tournament seedings in parentheses. P=Portland Region. All times are in Eastern.

== Rankings ==
Regular season polls
Poll	Pre- season	Week 2	Week 3	Week 4	Week 5	Week 6	Week 7	Week 8	Week 9	Week 10	Week 11	Week 12	Week 13	Week 14	Week 15	Week 16	Week 17	Week 18	Week 19	Final
AP											RV	RV	RV			RV	RV			N/A
Coaches												RV								

Legend
	Increase in ranking
	Decrease in ranking
	Not ranked previous week
(RV)	Received votes

== See also ==
- 2018–19 Clemson Tigers men's basketball team
