= 2018–19 North Carolina Tar Heels women's basketball team =

Intercollegiate basketball season

2018–19 North Carolina Tar Heels women's basketball

NCAA tournament, first round
- Conference: Atlantic Coast Conference
- Record: 18–15 (8–8 ACC)
- Head coach: Sylvia Hatchell (33rd season)
- Assistant coaches: Andrew Calder; Bett Shelby; Sylvia Crawley
- Home arena: Carmichael Arena

2018–19 ACC women's basketball standings
	Conf.				Overall
Team	W		L	PCT	W		L	PCT
No. 3 Notre Dame†	14	–	2	.875	35	–	4	.897
No. 5 Louisville	14	–	2	.875	32	–	4	.889
No. 10 NC State	12	–	4	.750	28	–	6	.824
No. 19 Miami (FL)	12	–	4	.750	25	–	9	.735
No. 12 Syracuse	11	–	5	.688	25	–	9	.735
No. 25 Florida State	10	–	6	.625	24	–	9	.727
Clemson	9	–	7	.563	20	–	13	.606
North Carolina	8	–	8	.500	18	–	15	.545
Georgia Tech	7	–	9	.438	17	–	13	.567
Virginia Tech	6	–	10	.375	22	–	12	.647
Duke	6	–	10	.375	15	–	15	.500
Virginia	5	–	11	.313	12	–	19	.387
Boston College	3	–	13	.188	14	–	16	.467
Pittsburgh	2	–	14	.125	11	–	20	.355
Wake Forest	1	–	15	.063	10	–	20	.333
† 2019 ACC tournament winner As of March 7, 2019; Rankings from AP poll

The 2018–19 North Carolina Tar Heels women's basketball team represented the University of North Carolina at Chapel Hill during the 2018–19 NCAA Division I women's basketball season. The Tar Heels, led by thirty-third-year head coach Sylvia Hatchell, played their games at Carmichael Arena and were members of the Atlantic Coast Conference. They finished the season 18–15, 9–9 in ACC play to finish in eighth place. They defeat Georgia Tech in the first round before losing in the second round of the ACC women's tournament to Notre Dame. They received an at-large bid to the NCAA women's tournament, which was their first trip since 2015. They lost in the first round to California.

On April 18, Hatchell resigned after an external review confirmed reports that she had made racially insensitive comments and mismanaged players' medical issues. Hatchell, the only coach with national titles in the AIAW, NAIA, and NCAA, left Chapel Hill with 1,023 wins overall and 751 in 33 seasons with the Tar Heels, including the 1994 NCAA title. The school tabbed Princeton's Courtney Banghart as their new head coach on April 29, officially announcing her the next day.

== Previous season ==
For the 2017–18 season, the Tar Heelss finished 15–16 overall and 4–12 in ACC play which was 12th place. North Carolina was eliminated in the second round of the ACC tournament by North Carolina State. The Tar Heels were not invited to post-season play.

== Off-season ==
=== Recruiting class ===
College recruiting
Name	Hometown	School	Height	Weight	Commit date
Kennedy Boyd; PG	Mint Hill, North Carolina	Providence Day School	5 ft 7 in (1.70 m)	N/A	
Kennedy Boyd; PG	Recruit ratings: ESPN: (90)				
Claudia Dickey; G	Charlotte, North Carolina	Charlotte Latin School	5 ft 10 in (1.78 m)	N/A	
Claudia Dickey; G	Recruit ratings: ESPN: (88)				
Overall recruit ranking:
Note: In many cases, Scout, Rivals, 247Sports, On3, and ESPN may conflict in their listings of height and weight.; In these cases, the average was taken. ESPN grades are on a 100-point scale.; Sources:

== Roster ==
2018–19 North Carolina Tar Heels women's basketball team
Players
Coaches

Pos.	#	Name	Height	Year	Previous school	Hometown
G	0	Shayla Bennett	5 ft 9 in (1.75 m)	Jr	Christ Church School; Gulf Coast State	Piedmont, SC
G	1	Taylor Koenen	6 ft 2 in (1.88 m)	Jr	Shakopee	Savage, MN
G	2	Kennedy Boyd	5 ft 7 in (1.7 m)	Fr	Providence Day School	Mint Hill, NC
G	3	Madinah Muhammad	5 ft 8 in (1.73 m)	Sr	Whitney Young; Ole Miss	Chicago, IL
G	4	Jocelyn Jones	6 ft 0 in (1.83 m)	RS So	Cosby	Richmond, VA
G	5	Stephanie Watts	5 ft 11 in (1.8 m)	RS Jr	Weddington	Wesley Chapel, NC
G	10	Claudia Dickey	5 ft 10 in (1.78 m)	Fr	Charlotte Latin	Charlotte, NC
F	11	Emily Sullivan	6 ft 4 in (1.93 m)	Jr	Reitz Memorial	Evansville, IN
F	13	Hunter West	6 ft 0 in (1.83 m)	RS Fr	South Lenoir	Deep Run, NC
G	14	Liz Roberts (W)	5 ft 8 in (1.73 m)	Jr	Durham Academy	Chapel Hill, NC
G	15	Olivia Smith	6 ft 0 in (1.83 m)	Jr	Cardinal Gibbons	Raleigh, NC
G	20	Leah Church	5 ft 8 in (1.73 m)	So	Forest Trail Academy	Purlear, NC
G	22	Paris Kea	5 ft 9 in (1.75 m)	RS Sr	Page; Vanderbilt	Greenboro, NC
G	24	Destinee Walker	5 ft 10 in (1.78 m)	RS Jr	Lake Highland Prep	Ocoee, FL
F	30	Jaelynn Murray	6 ft 2 in (1.88 m)	So	Dreher	Columbia, SC
C	34	Naomi Van Nes	6 ft 6 in (1.98 m)	Jr	Hamden Country Day	Dorchester, England
C	44	Janelle Bailey	6 ft 4 in (1.93 m)	Fr	Providence Day School	Matthews, NC

Head coach

- Sylvia Hatchell (Carson–Newman)

Assistant coach(es)

- Andrew Calder (Coker)
- Bett Shelby (UNC Wilmington)
- Sylvia Crawley (North Carolina)

Legend

- (C) Team captain
- (S) Suspended
- (I) Ineligible
- (W) Walk-on
- Injured
- Current redshirt

Roster
Last update: October 25, 2018

== Schedule ==
Date time, TV	Rank^{#}	Opponent^{#}	Result	Record	Site (attendance) city, state
Exhibition
November 1, 2018*; 6:00 pm, ACCN Extra		Carson-Newman	W 115–74		Carmichael Arena; Chapel Hill, NC
Non-conference regular season
November 6, 2018*; 7:00 pm		at Elon	W 100–69	1–0	Schar Center (1,622); Elon, NC
November 9, 2018*; 6:00 pm, ACCN Extra		Kent State	W 73–60	2–0	Carmichael Arena (2,005); Chapel Hill, NC
November 14, 2018*; 11:00 am, ACCN Extra		VCU	W 59–47	3–0	Carmichael Arena (2,893); Chapel Hill, NC
November 18, 2018*; 3:00 pm		at Colorado	L 74–86	3–1	CU Events Center (1,739); Boulder, CO
November 22, 2018*; 3:00 pm, FloHoops		vs. UCLA; Paradise Jam tournament Island Division	W 83–49	4–1	Sports and Fitness Center (874); Saint Thomas, USVI
November 23, 2018*; 3:00 pm, FloHoops		vs. No. 17 South Florida; Paradise Jam Island Division	W 71–69	5–1	Sports and Fitness Center (715); Saint Thomas, USVI
November 24, 2018*; 1:00 pm, FloHoops		vs. Kentucky; Paradise Jam Island Division	L 75–85	5–2	Sports and Fitness Center (814); Saint Thomas, USVI
November 29, 2018*; 7:00 pm, BTN+		at Ohio State; ACC–Big Ten Women's Challenge	L 69–76	5–3	Value City Arena (4,997); Columbus, OH
December 2, 2018*; 2:00 pm, ACCN Extra		Maine	L 73–85	5–4	Carmichael Arena (2,159); Chapel Hill, NC
December 5, 2018*; 3:30 pm, ACCN Extra		UNC Wilmington	W 82–55	6–4	Carmichael Arena (2,007); Chapel Hill, NC
December 14, 2018*; 7:00 pm, ACCN Extra		UNC Greensboro; Postponed from 12/9	W 83–62	7–4	Carmichael Arena (2,149); Chapel Hill, NC
December 18, 2018*; 8:30 pm		vs. Rice; Carolinas Challenge	W 71–50	8–4	Myrtle Beach Convention Center; Myrtle Beach, SC
December 20, 2018*; 6:30 pm, Stadium		vs. Auburn; Carolinas Challenge	L 81–86 ^{OT}	8–5	Myrtle Beach Convention Center; Myrtle Beach, SC
December 28, 2018*; 2:00 pm, ACCN Extra		Howard	W 85–63	9–5	Carmichael Arena (3,005); Chapel Hill, NC
ACC regular season
January 3, 2019; 7:00 pm, ACCN Extra		at No. 3 Louisville	L 66–73	9–6 (0–1)	KFC Yum! Center (8,506); Louisville, KY
January 6, 2019; 1:00 pm, RSN		Florida State	L 63–64	9–7 (0–2)	Carmichael Arena (2,497); Chapel Hill, NC
January 13, 2019; 3:00 pm, ACCN Extra		at No. 12 Syracuse	L 77–90	9–8 (0–3)	Carrier Dome (4,982); Syracuse, NY
January 17, 2019; 7:00 pm, RSN		Wake Forest	W 84–61	10–8 (1–3)	Carmichael Arena (2,056); Chapel Hill, NC
January 20, 2019; 7:00 pm, RSN		at Miami	L 68–76	10–9 (1–4)	Watsco Center (1,560); Coral Gables, FL
January 24, 2019; 7:00 pm, ACCN Extra		at Virginia Tech	W 81–69	11–9 (2–4)	Cassell Coliseum (1,450); Blacksburg, VA
January 27, 2019; 2:00 pm, ACCN Extra		No. 1 Notre Dame	W 78–73	12–9 (3–4)	Carmichael Arena (4,704); Chapel Hill, NC
January 31, 2019; 2:00 pm, ACCN Extra		Georgia Tech	W 91–90	13–9 (4–4)	Carmichael Arena (1,954); Chapel Hill, NC
February 3, 2019; 2:00 pm, ACCN Extra		at No. 7 NC State; Rivalry	W 64–51	14–9 (5–4)	Reynolds Coliseum (5,500); Raleigh, NC
February 7, 2019; 7:00 pm, ACCN Extra		Duke; Rivalry	L 69–85	14–10 (5–5)	Carmichael Arena (3,123); Chapel Hill, NC
February 10, 2019; 2:00 pm, ACCN Extra		at Clemson	W 70–64	15–10 (6–5)	Littlejohn Coliseum (2,224); Clemson, SC
February 14, 2019; 7:00 pm, ACCN Extra		at Pittsburgh	L 78–91	15–11 (6–6)	Peterson Events Center (754); Pittsburgh, PA
February 17, 2019; 3:00 pm, RSN		Virginia	W 70–53	16–11 (7–6)	Carmichael Arena (3,445); Chapel Hill, NC
February 21, 2019; 7:00 pm, ACCN Extra		Boston College	W 93–78	17–11 (8–6)	Carmichael Arena (1,950); Chapel Hill, NC
February 24, 2019; 12:00 pm, ESPNU		No. 9 NC State; Rivalry	L 69–74	17–12 (8–7)	Carmichael Arena (4,863); Chapel Hill, NC
March 3, 2019; 12:00 pm, ESPN2		at Duke; Rivalry	L 44–62	17–13 (8–8)	Cameron Indoor Stadium (9,314); Durham, NC
ACC Women's tournament
March 7, 2019; 2:00 pm, RSN	(8)	vs. (9) Georgia Tech; Second Round	W 80–73	18–13	Greensboro Coliseum (3,413); Greensboro, NC
March 8, 2019; 2:00 pm, RSN	(8)	vs. (1) No. 4 Notre Dame; Quarterfinals	L 77–95	18–14	Greensboro Coliseum (4,024); Greensboro, NC
NCAA Women's tournament
March 23, 2019; 3:30 pm, ESPN2	(9 G)	vs. (8 G) California; First Round	L 72–92	18–15	Ferrell Center; Waco, TX
*Non-conference game. ^{#}Rankings from AP Poll. (#) Tournament seedings in parentheses. G=Greensboro. All times are in Eastern.

== Rankings ==
Regular season polls
Poll	Pre- season	Week 2	Week 3	Week 4	Week 5	Week 6	Week 7	Week 8	Week 9	Week 10	Week 11	Week 12	Week 13	Week 14	Week 15	Week 16	Week 17	Week 18	Week 19	Final
AP				RV	RV									RV						
Coaches														RV	RV					

Legend
	Increase in ranking
	Decrease in ranking
	Not ranked previous week
(RV)	Received votes

^Coaches did not release a Week 2 poll.

== See also ==
- 2018–19 North Carolina Tar Heels men's basketball team
