= 2018–19 Charleston Cougars women's basketball team =

Intercollegiate basketball season

2018–19 College of Charleston Cougars women's basketball
- Conference: Colonial Athletic Association
- Record: 7–23 (3–15 CAA)
- Head coach: Candice M. Jackson (5th season)
- Assistant coaches: Kelvin Long; Malikah Willis; Brittany Parker
- Home arena: TD Arena

2018–19 CAA women's basketball standings
	Conf.				Overall
Team	W		L	PCT	W		L	PCT
James Madison	17	–	1	.944	29	–	6	.829
Drexel	14	–	4	.778	24	–	9	.727
Towson †	11	–	7	.611	20	–	13	.606
Delaware	11	–	7	.611	16	–	15	.516
UNC Wilmington	11	–	7	.611	18	–	12	.600
Northeastern	9	–	9	.500	20	–	12	.625
William & Mary	7	–	11	.389	14	–	17	.452
Elon	4	–	14	.222	9	–	21	.300
Hofstra	3	–	15	.167	11	–	22	.333
Charleston	3	–	15	.167	7	–	23	.233
† 2019 CAA tournament winner As of March 31, 2019; Rankings from AP poll

The 2018–19 College of Charleston Cougars women's basketball team represented the College of Charleston during the 2018–19 NCAA Division I women's basketball season. The Cougars, led by fifth-year head coach Candice M. Jackson, played their home games at the TD Arena and were members of the Colonial Athletic Association. They finished the season 7–23, 3–15 in CAA play to finish in a tie for last place. They lost in the first round of the CAA women's tournament to William & Mary.

On March 14, Jackson's contract was not renewed. She finished at Charleston with a five-year record of 39–103. The Cougars hired Lamar head coach Robin Harmony for the same position on April 19.

== Roster ==
2018–19 College of Charleston Cougars women's basketball team
Players
Coaches

Pos.	#	Name	Height	Year	Previous school	Hometown
G	0	Madison Taylor	5 ft 8 in (1.73 m)	Fr	Ravenscroft School	Raleigh, NC
G	1	Shai Blanding	5 ft 6 in (1.68 m)	So	Holy Innocents' Episcopal	Atlanta, GA
G	2	Darien Huff	5 ft 8 in (1.73 m)	Sr	Elizabethtown	Elizabethtown, KY
G	3	Latrice Perkins	5 ft 11 in (1.8 m)	Fr	Winder-Barrow	Winder, GA
G	5	Cailin Dorsey	5 ft 11 in (1.8 m)	Jr	Ravenscroft School	Raleigh, NC
G	10	Dee Heath	5 ft 9 in (1.75 m)	Jr	Northwood Academy	Hanahan, SC
G	11	Bryanna Goodson	5 ft 9 in (1.75 m)	So	Wilson	Florence, SC
F	15	Arynn Eady	6 ft 1 in (1.85 m)	Fr	St. Francis	Atlanta, GA
F	20	Bri Sullivan	6 ft 1 in (1.85 m)	Sr	Colonial Forge	Fredericksburg, VA
F/C	21	Baileigh Larson	6 ft 2 in (1.88 m)	Jr	Oakleaf	Orange Park, FL
G	23	Tyler Collins	5 ft 6 in (1.68 m)	Fr	Woodward Academy	Atlanta, GA
F	24	Lexi Maddox	6 ft 1 in (1.85 m)	So	Winder-Barrow	Winder, GA
G	25	Deja Ford	5 ft 9 in (1.75 m)	Jr	St. Mary's Ryken	Waldorf, MD
G	40	Morgan Brown-Walker	5 ft 11 in (1.8 m)	Fr	Hammond School	Sumter, SC
F/C	42	Ericka Broughton	6 ft 2 in (1.88 m)	RS Fr	Goose Creek	Goose Creek, SC

Head coach

- Candice M. Jackson (Michigan State)

Assistant coach(es)

- Kelvin Long (East Tennessee State)
- Malikah Willis (Iowa)
- Brittany Parker (Fayetteville State)

Legend

- (C) Team captain
- (S) Suspended
- (I) Ineligible
- (W) Walk-on
- Injured
- Current redshirt

Roster

== Schedule ==
Date time, TV	Rank^{#}	Opponent^{#}	Result	Record	Site (attendance) city, state
Exhibition
Nov 3, 2018*; 2:00 pm		Southern Wesleyan	W 100–61		TD Arena; Charleston, SC
Non-conference regular season
Nov 7, 2018*; 6:30 pm		North Greenville	W 95–62	1–0	TD Arena (296); Charleston, SC
Nov 10, 2018*; 2:00 pm		South Carolina State	W 75–51	2–0	TD Arena (394); Charleston, SC
Nov 15, 2018*; 7:00 pm, ESPN+		at Campbell	L 65–66	2–1	Gore Arena (714); Buies Creek, NC
Nov 18, 2018*; 2:00 pm, ESPN+		at Wofford	L 58–78	2–2	Jerry Richardson Indoor Stadium (454); Spartanburg, SC
Nov 24, 2018*; 2:00 pm		Furman	L 67–70	2–3	TD Arena (366); Charleston, SC
Nov 29, 2018*; 7:00 pm		Winthrop	L 64–71	2–4	TD Arena (253); Charleston, SC
Dec 2, 2018*; 2:00 pm		at Appalachian State	L 66–80	2–5	Holmes Center (367); Boone, NC
Dec 16, 2018*; 4:00 pm, ESPN+		at Lipscomb	W 65–63	3–5	Allen Arena (215); Nashville, TN
Dec 19, 2018*; 6:30 pm		Charleston Southern	W 79–52	4–5	TD Arena (303); Charleston, SC
Dec 21, 2018*; 12:00 pm		Presbyterian	L 65–71	4–6	TD Arena (291); Charleston, SC
Dec 31, 2018*; 2:00 pm, ESPN+		at George Mason	L 52–66	4–7	EagleBank Arena (841); Fairfax, VA
CAA regular season
Jan 4, 2019; 11:30 am		at UNC Wilmington	L 49–71	4–8 (0–1)	Trask Coliseum (4,511); Wilmington, NC
Jan 11, 2019; 7:00 pm		at Elon	L 68–76	4–9 (0–2)	Schar Center (461); Elon, NC
Jan 13, 2019; 7:00 pm		at William & Mary	W 66–54	5–9 (1–2)	Kaplan Arena (582); Williamburg, VA
Jan 18, 2019; 6:30 pm		Towson	L 61–77	5–10 (1–3)	TD Arena (345); Charleston, SC
Jan 20, 2019; 2:00 pm		James Madison	L 50–91	5–11 (1–4)	TD Arena (350); Charleston, SC
Jan 25, 2019; 7:00 pm		at Drexel	L 53–76	5–12 (1–5)	Daskalakis Athletic Center (633); Philadelphia, PA
Jan 27, 2019; 1:00 pm		at Delaware	L 50–74	5–13 (1–6)	Bob Carpenter Center (1,212); Newark, DE
Feb 1, 2019; 6:30 pm		Northeastern	L 56–87	5–14 (1–7)	TD Arena (218); Charleston, SC
Feb 3, 2019; 1:00 pm		Hofstra	W 70–62	6–14 (2–7)	TD Arena (218); Charleston, SC
Feb 8, 2019; 11:30 am		William & Mary	W 79–77 ^{2OT}	7–14 (3–7)	TD Arena (3,031); Charleston, SC
Feb 10, 2019; 2:00 pm		Elon	L 52–72	7–15 (3–8)	TD Arena (442); Charleston, SC
Feb 15, 2019; 12:00 pm		at James Madison	L 35–76	7–16 (3–9)	JMU Convocation Center (1,819); Harrisonburg, VA
Feb 17, 2019; 2:00 pm		at Towson	L 61–87	7–17 (3–10)	SECU Arena (501); Towson, MD
Feb 22, 2019; 6:30 pm		Delaware	L 60–72	7–18 (3–11)	TD Arena (341); Charleston, SC
Feb 24, 2019; 2:00 pm		Drexel	L 42–65	7–19 (3–12)	TD Arena (329); Charleston, SC
Mar 1, 2019; 7:00 pm		at Hofstra	L 49–68	7–20 (3–13)	Hofstra Arena (292); Hempstead, NY
Mar 3, 2019; 1:00 pm		at Northeastern	L 69–81	7–21 (3–14)	Cabot Center (292); Boston, MA
Mar 8, 2019; 6:30 pm		UNC Wilmington	L 62–66	7–22 (3–15)	TD Arena (439); Charleston, SC
CAA Women's Tournament
Mar 13, 2019; 2:30 pm, CAA.tv	(10)	vs. (7) William & Mary; First Round	L 41–61	7–23	Bob Carpenter Center; Newark, DE
*Non-conference game. ^{#}Rankings from AP Poll. (#) Tournament seedings in parentheses. All times are in Eastern Time.

== See also ==
- 2018–19 Charleston Cougars men's basketball team
