= 2018–19 Drexel Dragons women's basketball team =

American college basketball season

2018–19 Drexel Dragons women's basketball

TD Bank Classic Champions

WNIT, First Round
- Conference: Colonial Athletic Association
- Record: 24–9 (14–4 CAA)
- Head coach: Denise Dillon (16th season)
- Assistant coaches: Amy Mallon (15th season); Stacy Weiss (7th season); Michelle Baker (5th season)
- MVP: Bailey Greenberg
- Home arena: Daskalakis Athletic Center

2018–19 CAA women's basketball standings
	Conf.				Overall
Team	W		L	PCT	W		L	PCT
James Madison	17	–	1	.944	29	–	6	.829
Drexel	14	–	4	.778	24	–	9	.727
Towson †	11	–	7	.611	20	–	13	.606
Delaware	11	–	7	.611	16	–	15	.516
UNC Wilmington	11	–	7	.611	18	–	12	.600
Northeastern	9	–	9	.500	20	–	12	.625
William & Mary	7	–	11	.389	14	–	17	.452
Elon	4	–	14	.222	9	–	21	.300
Hofstra	3	–	15	.167	11	–	22	.333
Charleston	3	–	15	.167	7	–	23	.233
† 2019 CAA tournament winner As of March 31, 2019; Rankings from AP poll

The 2018–19 Drexel Dragons women's basketball team represented Drexel University during the 2018–19 NCAA Division I women's basketball season. The Dragons, led by sixteenth-year head coach Denise Dillon, play their home games at the Daskalakis Athletic Center in Philadelphia, Pennsylvania as members of the Colonial Athletic Association. They finished the season 24–9, 14–4 in CAA play to finish in second place. They advanced to the championship game of the CAA women's tournament where they lost to Towson. They received an at-large bid to the Women's National Invitational Tournament where they lost in the first round to Harvard.

== Previous season ==
The Dragons finished the 2017–18 season 27–8, 16–2 in CAA play to finish in a tie for 1st place. They lost to Elon in the CAA tournament.

== Offseason ==
=== Departures ===
Name	Number	Pos.	Height	Year	Hometown	Notes
Sara Woods	14	G/F	5'10"	Senior	Olney, MD	Graduated
Megan Marecic	21	G	5'11"	RS Junior	Bethel Park, PA	Transferred to Seton Hill
Hayley Wardwell	22	G	5'10"	Freshman	Hanover, MA	Transferred to West Florida
Kelsi Lidge	25	F	5'8"	Senior	Aurora, CO	Graduated

=== 2018 recruiting class ===
College recruiting information
Name	Hometown	School	Height	Weight	Commit date
Maura Hendrixson; SG	Souderton, PA	Cardinal O'Hara HS (PA)	5 ft 9 in (1.75 m)	N/A	Jul 30, 2016
Maura Hendrixson; SG	Recruit ratings: No ratings found				
Kate Connolly; SF	Souderton, PA	Souderton Area HS	6 ft 1 in (1.85 m)	N/A	Nov 15, 2016
Kate Connolly; SF	Recruit ratings: No ratings found				
Keishana Washington; PG	Pickering, Ontario	Durham Elite Prep	5 ft 7 in (1.70 m)	N/A	May 24, 2017
Keishana Washington; PG	Recruit ratings: No ratings found				
Overall recruit ranking:
Note: In many cases, Scout, Rivals, 247Sports, On3, and ESPN may conflict in their listings of height and weight.; In these cases, the average was taken. ESPN grades are on a 100-point scale.; Sources: "Drexel 2018 Basketball Commitments". Rivals.; "Drexel Dragons". ESPN.; "2018 Team Ranking". Rivals.

== Roster ==
2018–19 Drexel Dragons women's basketball team
Players
Coaches

Pos.	#	Name	Height	Year	Previous school	Hometown
G	1	Keishana Washington	5 ft 7 in (1.7 m)	Fr	Durham Elite Prep	Pickering, Ontario
G	4	Kayla Bacon	5 ft 8 in (1.73 m)	So	Seton Keough	Owings Mills, MD
F	10	Eline Maesschalck	5 ft 11 in (1.8 m)	Sr	KA Redingenhof	Aalst, Belgium
G	11	Aubree Brown	5 ft 11 in (1.8 m)	RS Jr	Archbishop Wood	Philadelphia, PA
G	12	Hannah Nihill	5 ft 3 in (1.6 m)	So	Cardinal O'Hara	Drexel Hill, PA
F	20	Kate Connolly	6 ft 1 in (1.85 m)	Fr	Souderton Area HS	Harleysville, PA
G	22	Maura Hendrixson	5 ft 9 in (1.75 m)	Fr	Cardinal O'Hara HS (PA)	Garnet Valley, PA
F	23	Bailey Greenberg	5 ft 11 in (1.8 m)	Jr	Archbishop Wood	Philadelphia, PA
F	24	Niki Metzel	6 ft 2 in (1.88 m)	Jr	Rutgers Prep	Princeton, NJ
F	30	Mariah Leonard	5 ft 10 in (1.78 m)	RS So	Broad Run	Ashburn, VA
C	34	Tereza Kracikova	6 ft 2 in (1.88 m)	Sr	Gymnazium Pripotocni	Prague, Czech Republic
G	50	Ana Ferariu	5 ft 9 in (1.75 m)	Jr	Johannes Honterus	Brașov, Romania

Head coach

- Denise Dillon (Villanova)

Assistant coach(es)

- Amy Mallon (Saint Joseph's)
- Stacy McCullough (Drexel)
- Michelle Baker (Saint Joseph's)

Legend

- (C) Team captain
- (S) Suspended
- (I) Ineligible
- (W) Walk-on
- Injured
- Current redshirt

Roster
Last update: June 25, 2018

== Schedule and results ==
Date time, TV	Rank^{#}	Opponent^{#}	Result	Record	High points	High rebounds	High assists	Site (attendance) city, state
Exhibition
November 3, 2018*; 2:00 pm		West Chester	W 67–39		–	–	–	Daskalakis Athletic Center; Philadelphia, PA
Non-conference regular season
November 9, 2018*; 7:00 pm		Quinnipiac	L 52–56	0–1	17 – Greenberg	10 – Greenberg	5 – Brown	Daskalakis Athletic Center (1,370); Philadelphia, PA
November 11, 2018*; 2:00 pm		Saint Joseph's	W 51–34	1–1	17 – Greenberg	8 – Greenberg	5 – Washington	Daskalakis Athletic Center (1,004); Philadelphia, PA
November 15, 2018*; 7:00 pm		Bucknell	W 64–42	2–1	20 – Greenberg	8 – Metzel	4 – Nihill	Daskalakis Athletic Center (359); Philadelphia, PA
November 23, 2018*; 7:00 pm		vs. Siena; TD Bank Classic semifinals	W 51–39	3–1	19 – Greenberg	8 – Ferariu	8 – Brown	Patrick Gym (285); Burlington, VT
November 24, 2018*; 4:00 pm, ESPN+		at Vermont; TD Bank Classic finals	W 60–44	4–1	22 – Greenberg	8 – Greenberg	5 – Washington	Patrick Gym (333); Burlington, VT
November 28, 2018*; 7:00 pm, ESPN+		at La Salle	W 58–43	5–1	19 – Greenberg	10 – Metzel	5 – Brown	Tom Gola Arena; Philadelphia, PA
December 7, 2018*; 7:00 pm		at Manhattan; Manhattan College Holiday Tournament	W 53–39	6–1	15 – Greenberg	8 – Greenberg	4 – Brown	Draddy Gymnasium (210); Riverdale, NY
December 8, 2018*; 3:30 pm		vs. Wright State; Manhattan College Holiday Tournament	L 63–71 ^{OT}	6–2	24 – Greenberg	8 – Metzel	7 – Tied	Draddy Gymnasium (115); Riverdale, NY
December 16, 2018*; 2:00 pm		Gardner–Webb	W 65–48	7–2	17 – Nihill	13 – Metzel	3 – Brown	Daskalakis Athletic Center (624); Philadelphia, PA
December 21, 2018*; 11:30 am		Penn	L 39–55	7–3	9 – Nihill	6 – Greenberg	4 – Ferariu	Daskalakis Athletic Center (1,625); Philadelphia, PA
December 29, 2018*; 2:00 pm, ESPN+		at Richmond	W 58–35	8–3	11 – Greenberg	10 – Greenberg	5 – Nihill	Robins Center (635); Richmond, VA
CAA regular season
January 4, 2019; 7:00 pm		Towson	L 54–55	8–4 (0–1)	17 – Greenberg	8 – Greenberg	7 – Brown	Daskalakis Athletic Center (517); Philadelphia, PA
January 6, 2019; 2:00 pm		James Madison	L 35–51	8–5 (0–2)	17 – Greenberg	9 – Metzel	4 – Brown	Daskalakis Athletic Center (629); Philadelphia, PA
January 13, 2019; 2:00 pm, NBCSPHI		at Delaware	W 57–40	9–5 (1–2)	16 – Hendrixson	10 – Brown	6 – Brown	Bob Carpenter Center (1,156); Newark, DE
January 18, 2019; 7:00 pm		at Northeastern	W 61–59	10–5 (2–2)	26 – Greenberg	8 – Greenberg	6 – Brown	Cabot Center (391); Boston, MA
January 20, 2019; 2:00 pm		at Hofstra	W 61–49	11–5 (3–2)	13 – Greenberg	7 – Greenberg	4 – Tied	Hofstra Arena (148); Hempstead, NY
January 25, 2019; 7:00 pm		Charleston	W 76–53	12–5 (4–2)	18 – Greenberg	3 – Tied	8 – Nihill	Daskalakis Athletic Center (633); Philadelphia, PA
January 27, 2019; 2:00 pm		UNC Wilmington	W 67–55	13–5 (5–2)	31 – Greenberg	8 – Brown	9 – Brown	Daskalakis Athletic Center (1,045); Philadelphia, PA
February 1, 2019; 7:00 pm		at Elon	W 59–44	14–5 (6–2)	24 – Greenberg	9 – Greenberg	4 – Brown	Schar Center (467); Elon, NC
February 3, 2019; 2:00 pm		at William & Mary	W 62–58	15–5 (7–2)	24 – Greenberg	11 – Greenberg	4 – Greenberg	Kaplan Arena (962); Williamsburg, VA
February 10, 2019; 5:00 pm, NBCSPHI		Delaware	W 58–41	16–5 (8–2)	23 – Greenberg	7 – Greenberg	3 – Tied	Daskalakis Athletic Center (821); Philadelphia, PA
February 15, 2019; 7:00 pm		Hofstra	W 62–38	17–5 (9–2)	15 – Greenburg	7 – Greenburg	9 – Nihill	Daskalakis Athletic Center (684); Philadelphia, PA
February 17, 2019; 2:00 pm, NBCSPHI		Northeastern	W 76–45	18–5 (10–2)	17 – Greenburg	6 – Greenburg	8 – Brown	Daskalakis Athletic Center (1,074); Philadelphia, PA
February 22, 2019; 7:00 pm		at UNC Wilmington	W 65–53	19–5 (11–2)	21 – Washington	10 – Greenburg	6 – Brown	Trask Coliseum (752); Wilmington, NC
February 24, 2019; 1:00 pm		at Charleston	W 65–42	20–5 (12–2)	21 – Greenburg	8 – Brown	6 – Brown	TD Arena (329); Charleston, SC
March 1, 2019; 7:00 pm		William & Mary	L 72–77 ^{3OT}	20–6 (12–3)	24 – Greenburg	8 – Tied	4 – Greenburg	Daskalakis Athletic Center (628); Philadelphia, PA
March 3, 2019; 2:00 pm, NBCSPHI+		Elon	W 68–45	21–6 (13–3)	18 – Greenburg	6 – Kracikova	5 – Brown	Daskalakis Athletic Center (848); Philadelphia, PA
March 7, 2019; 7:00 pm		at James Madison	L 47–58	21–7 (13–4)	18 – Greenberg	9 – Greenberg	5 – Washington	JMU Convocation Center (2,097); Harrisonburg, VA
March 9, 2019; 2:00 pm		at Towson	W 77–44	22–7 (14–4)	15 – Metzel	6 – Greenberg	3 – Tied	SECU Arena (487); Towson, MD
CAA Tournament
March 14, 2019; 5:00 pm	(2)	vs. (7) William & Mary; Quarterfinals	W 71–60	23–7	20 – Metzel	9 – Greenberg	4 – Metzel	Bob Carpenter Center (881); Newark, DE
March 15, 2019; 5:00 pm	(2)	vs. (6) Northeastern; Semifinals	W 73–69 ^{OT}	24–7	24 – Metzel	15 – Greenberg	5 – Washington	Bob Carpenter Center (442); Newark, DE
March 15, 2019; 1:00 pm, NBCSPHI	(2)	vs. (4) Towson; Championship	L 49–53	24–8	15 – Greenburg	6 – Brown	4 – Brown	Bob Carpenter Center (761); Newark, DE
WNIT
March 22, 2018; 7:00 pm, ESPN+		at Harvard; First round	L 56–69	24–9	16 – Brown	9 – Greenburg	4 – Brown	Lavietes Pavilion (267); Cambridge, MA
*Non-conference game. ^{#}Rankings from AP. (#) Tournament seedings in parentheses. All times are in Eastern Time.

== See also ==
- 2018–19 Drexel Dragons men's basketball team
