= 2018–19 Towson Tigers women's basketball team =

Intercollegiate basketball season

2018–19 Towson Tigers women's basketball

CAA tournament champions

NCAA tournament, first round
- Conference: Colonial Athletic Association
- Record: 20–13 (11–7 CAA)
- Head coach: Diane Richardson (2nd season)
- Assistant coaches: Zach Kancher; Wanisha Smith; Dana Wieller
- Home arena: SECU Arena

2018–19 CAA women's basketball standings
	Conf.				Overall
Team	W		L	PCT	W		L	PCT
James Madison	17	–	1	.944	29	–	6	.829
Drexel	14	–	4	.778	24	–	9	.727
Towson †	11	–	7	.611	20	–	13	.606
Delaware	11	–	7	.611	16	–	15	.516
UNC Wilmington	11	–	7	.611	18	–	12	.600
Northeastern	9	–	9	.500	20	–	12	.625
William & Mary	7	–	11	.389	14	–	17	.452
Elon	4	–	14	.222	9	–	21	.300
Hofstra	3	–	15	.167	11	–	22	.333
Charleston	3	–	15	.167	7	–	23	.233
† 2019 CAA tournament winner As of March 31, 2019; Rankings from AP poll

The 2018–19 Towson Tigers women's basketball team represented Towson University during the 2018–19 NCAA Division I women's basketball season. The Tigers, led by second year head coach Diane Richardson, played their home games at SECU Arena and were members of the Colonial Athletic Association (CAA). They finished the season 20–13, 11–7 CAA play to finish in a 3 way tie for third place. Towson won the CAA tournament championship game over Drexel, 53–49 to send Towson to their first ever NCAA tournament. They lost in the first round of the NCAA women's tournament to Connecticut.

== Roster ==
2018–19 Towson Tigers women's basketball team
Players
Coaches

Pos.	#	Name	Height	Year	Previous school	Hometown
G	0	Danielle Durjan	5 ft 10 in (1.78 m)	Sr	Watkins Mills; Hartford CC/Sacred Heart	Montgomery County, MD
G/F	1	Nukiya Mayo	6 ft 3 in (1.91 m)	Jr	Monsignor Scanlan	Bronx, NY
G	2	Cydney Le Rivera	5 ft 8 in (1.73 m)	Fr	Lutheran High North	Cypress, TX
F	3	Aislinn Flynn	6 ft 3 in (1.91 m)	Fr	Long Island Lutheran	Point Lookout, NY
G	4	Jalynn Holmes	5 ft 9 in (1.75 m)	So	Riverdale Baptist	Upper Marlboro, MD
G	5	Rayna Barbour	5 ft 3 in (1.6 m)	So	Paul VI Catholic	Fort Washington, MD
C	10	Janeen Camp	6 ft 5 in (1.96 m)	Fr	TPLS Christian Academy	Portsmouth, VA
G	11	Qierra Murray	5 ft 9 in (1.75 m)	RS Jr	Milford Mill Academy; Appalachian State	Baltimore, MD
G	10	Jennifer Davis	5 ft 5 in (1.65 m)	Fr	TPLS Christian Academy	Richmond, VA
G	15	Mariah Gray	5 ft 7 in (1.7 m)	Jr	Good Counsel	Ellicott City, MD
G	21	Kionna Jeter	5 ft 8 in (1.73 m)	RS So	Spartanburg; Gulf Coast CC	Spartanburg, SC
G	23	Shavonne Smith	5 ft 11 in (1.8 m)	Fr	Pembertown Township	Pemberton Township, NJ
F	24	Tess Borgosz	6 ft 2 in (1.88 m)	So	Depew	Depew, NY
C	25	Maia Lee	6 ft 4 in (1.93 m)	RS Sr	McLean; Old Dominion	McLean, VA
G	32	Ryan Holder	5 ft 11 in (1.8 m)	Jr	Roland Park Country School; Harford CC/Massachusetts	Baltimore, MD

Head coach

- Diane Richardson (Frostburg State)

Assistant coach(es)

- Zach Kancher (George Washington)
- Wanisha Smith (Duke)
- Dana Wieller (Bloomsburg)

Legend

- (C) Team captain
- (S) Suspended
- (I) Ineligible
- (W) Walk-on
- Injured
- Current redshirt

Roster

== Schedule ==
Date time, TV	Rank^{#}	Opponent^{#}	Result	Record	Site (attendance) city, state
Non-conference regular season
Nov 6, 2018*; 7:00 pm, ACCNE		at Wake Forest	L 53–60	0–1	LJVM Coliseum (387); Winston-Salem, NC
Nov 11, 2018*; 2:00 pm		Massachusetts	W 78–53	1–1	SECU Arena (1,389); Towson, MD
Nov 17, 2018*; 7:00 pm		La Salle	W 92–68	2–1	SECU Arena; Towson, MD
Nov 20, 2018*; 7:00 pm, ESPN+		at UMBC	W 71–62	3–1	UMBC Event Center (197); Catonsville, MD
Nov 24, 2018*; 1:00 pm		at Mount St. Mary's	L 78–87	3–2	Knott Arena (302); Emmitsburg, MD
Nov 27, 2018*; 7:00 pm, ESPN+		at George Washington	L 63–76	3–3	Charles E. Smith Center (715); Washington, D.C.
Dec 2, 2018*; 2:00 pm, ACCNE		at No. 12 Syracuse	L 55–98	3–4	Carrier Dome (1,450); Syracuse, NY
Dec 4, 2018*; 11:00 am		Loyola (MD)	W 62–57	4–4	SECU Arena (3,423); Towson, MD
Dec 10, 2018*; 7:00 pm, ESPN+		at Saint Joseph's	W 73–52	5–4	Hagan Arena (354); Philadelphia, PA
Dec 20, 2018*; 7:00 pm		at West Virginia	L 43–90	5–5	WVU Coliseum (1,108); Morgantown, WV
Dec 22, 2018*; 1:00 pm		at Marshall	W 76–69	6–5	Cam Henderson Center (848); Huntington, WV
CAA regular season
Jan 4, 2019; 7:00 pm		at Drexel	W 55–54	7–5 (1–0)	Daskalakis Athletic Center (517); Philadelphia, PA
Jan 6, 2019; 2:00 pm		at Delaware	W 56–48	8–5 (2–0)	Bob Carpenter Center (1,225); Newark, DE
Jan 11, 2019; 7:00 pm		Northeastern	W 88–83	9–5 (3–0)	SECU Arena (632); Towson, MD
Jan 13, 2019; 2:00 pm		Hofstra	W 92–68	10–5 (4–0)	SECU Arena (208); Towson, MD
Jan 18, 2019; 6:30 pm		at College of Charleston	W 77–61	11–5 (5–0)	TD Arena (345); Charleston, SC
Jan 20, 2019; 2:00 pm		at UNC Wilmington	L 73–77	11–6 (5–1)	Trask Coliseum (1,027); Wilmington, NC
Jan 25, 2019; 7:00 pm		Elon	W 59–58	12–6 (6–1)	SECU Arena (583); Towson, MD
Jan 27, 2019; 2:00 pm		William & Mary	L 69–80	12–7 (6–2)	SECU Arena (609); Towson, MD
Feb 3, 2019; 2:00 pm		at James Madison	L 59–71	12–8 (6–3)	JMU Convocation Center (2,406); Harrisonburg, VA
Feb 8, 2019; 7:00 pm		at Hofstra	W 68–56	13–8 (7–3)	Hofstra Arena (405); Hempstead, NY
Feb 10, 2019; 2:00 pm		at Northeastern	L 68–77	13–9 (7–4)	Cabot Center (357); Boston, MA
Feb 15, 2019; 7:00 pm		UNC Wilmington	W 82–61	14–9 (8–4)	SECU Arena (521); Towson, MD
Feb 17, 2019; 2:00 pm		College of Charleston	W 87–61	15–9 (9–4)	SECU Arena (501); Towson, MD
Feb 22, 2019; 7:00 pm		at William & Mary	W 82–75	16–9 (10–4)	Kaplan Arena (727); Williamsburg, VA
Feb 24, 2019; 2:00 pm		at Elon	W 59–50	17–9 (11–4)	Schar Center (421); Elon, NC
Mar 3, 2019; 2:00 pm		James Madison	L 56–63	17–10 (11–5)	SECU Arena (752); Towson, MD
Mar 7, 2019; 7:00 pm		Delaware	L 57–70	17–11 (11–6)	SECU Arena (411); Towson, MD
Mar 9, 2019; 2:00 pm		Drexel	L 44–77	17–12 (11–7)	SECU Arena (487); Towson, MD
CAA Women's Tournament
Mar 14, 2019; 2:30 pm, CAA.tv	(5)	vs. (4) Delaware; Quarterfinals	W 59–49	18–12	Bob Carpenter Center; Newark, DE
Mar 15, 2019; 1:00 pm, CAA.tv	(5)	vs. (9) Hofstra; Semifinals	W 69–48	19–12	Bob Carpenter Center; Newark, DE
Mar 16, 2019; 1:00 pm, NBCSWA	(5)	vs. (2) Drexel; Championship	W 53–49	20–12	Bob Carpenter Center (761); Newark, DE
NCAA Women's Tournament
Mar 22, 2019*; 7:00 pm, ESPN2	(15 A)	at (2 A) No. 2 Connecticut; First Round	L 61–110	20–13	Harry A. Gampel Pavilion (4,159); Storrs, CT
*Non-conference game. ^{#}Rankings from AP Poll. (#) Tournament seedings in parentheses. A=Albany Region. All times are in Eastern Time.

== See also ==
2018–19 Towson Tigers men's basketball team
