= 2018–19 UNC Wilmington Seahawks women's basketball team =

Intercollegiate basketball season

2018–19 UNC Wilmington Seahawks women's basketball
- Conference: Colonial Athletic Association
- Record: 18–12 (11–7 CAA)
- Head coach: Karen Barefoot (2nd season)
- Assistant coaches: Tina Martin; Brittany Morris; Ali Ford
- Home arena: Trask Coliseum

2018–19 CAA women's basketball standings
	Conf.				Overall
Team	W		L	PCT	W		L	PCT
James Madison	17	–	1	.944	29	–	6	.829
Drexel	14	–	4	.778	24	–	9	.727
Towson †	11	–	7	.611	20	–	13	.606
Delaware	11	–	7	.611	16	–	15	.516
UNC Wilmington	11	–	7	.611	18	–	12	.600
Northeastern	9	–	9	.500	20	–	12	.625
William & Mary	7	–	11	.389	14	–	17	.452
Elon	4	–	14	.222	9	–	21	.300
Hofstra	3	–	15	.167	11	–	22	.333
Charleston	3	–	15	.167	7	–	23	.233
† 2019 CAA tournament winner As of March 31, 2019; Rankings from AP poll

The 2018–19 UNC Wilmington Seahawks women's basketball team represented the University of North Carolina Wilmington during the 2018–19 NCAA Division I women's basketball season. The Seahawks, led by second year head coach Karen Barefoot, played their home games at the Trask Coliseum and were members of the Colonial Athletic Association (CAA). They finished the season 18–12, 11–7 CAA play to finish in a 3-way tie for third place. They lost in the quarterfinals of the CAA women's tournament to Northeastern.

== Roster ==
2018–19 UNC Wilmington Seahawks women's basketball team
Players
Coaches

Pos.	#	Name	Height	Year	Previous school	Hometown
G	0	Ashli Jeune	5 ft 10 in (1.78 m)	RS Sr	Life Center Academy; Rutgers	Westampton, NJ
F	1	Paige Powell	6 ft 2 in (1.88 m)	So	East Columbus	Hallsboro, NC
G	2	Moriah Crisp	5 ft 2 in (1.57 m)	Jr	Bishop McNamara	Waldorf, MD
F	3	Jessica Munoz (redshirt)	6 ft 1 in (1.85 m)	Jr	Central Heights; Old Dominion	Nacogdoches, TX
G	4	Shrita Parker	5 ft 7 in (1.7 m)	RS Sr	Ocean Lakes; Rutgers	Virginia Beach, VA
G	5	Gigi Smith	5 ft 10 in (1.78 m)	RS Jr	Lake Taylor; Old Dominion	Norfolk, VA
G	10	Ahyiona Vason	5 ft 4 in (1.63 m)	Jr	Jefferson Davis; Pensacola State	Montgomery, AL
G	11	Dazia Powell (redshirt)	5 ft 10 in (1.78 m)	So	Millbrook; North Carolina	Raleigh, NC
G	12	Julia Buehler	5 ft 7 in (1.7 m)	Sr	John T. Hoggard; Appalachian State	Wilmington, NC
G	13	Lacey Suggs	5 ft 10 in (1.78 m)	Jr	East Bladen	White Lake, NC
G	22	Zhaneia Thybulle	5 ft 7 in (1.7 m)	Fr	Elmont Memorial	Elmont, NY
F	24	Chinyere Bell	6 ft 0 in (1.83 m)	Sr	South View; George Mason	Fayetteville, NC
F	25	Micah Hoggatt	6 ft 0 in (1.83 m)	So	Salem	Conyers, GA
F	31	Jessica Mitchell	6 ft 1 in (1.85 m)	Fr	Linganore	Mount Airy, MD
F	32	Carol-Anne Obusek	6 ft 3 in (1.91 m)	So	Grace Christian; High Point	Cary, NC
G	33	Grace Sacco	5 ft 5 in (1.65 m)	So	Ocean City	Ocean City, NJ

Head coach

- Karen Barefoot (Christopher Newport)

Assistant coach(es)

- Tina Martin (Lock Haven)
- Brittany Morris (Seton Hall)
- Ali Ford (Elon)

Legend

- (C) Team captain
- (S) Suspended
- (I) Ineligible
- (W) Walk-on
- Injured
- Current redshirt

Roster

== Schedule ==
Date time, TV	Rank^{#}	Opponent^{#}	Result	Record	Site (attendance) city, state
Exhibition
Oct 27, 2018*; 12:00 pm		Catawba	W 79–55		Trask Coliseum (598); Wilmington, NC
Non-conference regular season
Nov 6, 2018*; 7:00 pm		Belmont Abbey	W 74–58	1–0	Trask Coliseum (557); Wilmington, NC
Nov 11, 2018*; 1:00 pm, ESPN+		at Ohio	L 72–95	1–1	Convocation Center (449); Athens, OH
Nov 14, 2018*; 11:30 am		Presbyterian	W 63–48	2–1	Trask Coliseum (746); Wilmington, NC
Nov 17, 2018*; 1:00 pm		Grand Canyon	W 77–55	3–1	Trask Coliseum (619); Wilmington, NC
Nov 20, 2018*; 11:00 am		at North Carolina Central	W 89–82	4–1	McDougald–McLendon Gymnasium (531); Durham, NC
Nov 28, 2018*; 6:00 pm, ESPN+		at VCU	L 47–58	4–2	Siegel Center (536); Richmond, VA
Dec 1, 2018*; 2:00 pm		Fayetteville State	W 72–54	5–2	Trask Coliseum (570); Wilmington, NC
Dec 5, 2018*; 3:30 pm, ACCNE		at North Carolina	L 55–82	5–3	Carmichael Arena (2,007); Chapel Hill, NC
Dec 18, 2018*; 7:00 pm, ACCNE		at Pittsburgh	L 56–60	5–4	Peterson Events Center (435); Pittsburgh, PA
Dec 21, 2018*; 7:00 pm		Longwood	W 35–33	6–4	Trask Coliseum (831); Wilmington, NC
Dec 30, 2018*; 12:00 pm		at East Carolina	W 71–68	7–4	Williams Arena (982); Greenville, NC
CAA regular season
Jan 4, 2019; 11:30 am		College of Charleston	W 71–49	8–4 (1–0)	Trask Coliseum (4,511); Wilmington, NC
Jan 11, 2019; 7:00 pm		at William & Mary	L 64–70	8–5 (1–1)	Kaplan Arena (657); Williamsburg, VA
Jan 13, 2019; 2:00 pm		at Elon	W 65–60	9–5 (2–1)	Schar Center (919); Elon, NC
Jan 18, 2019; 7:00 pm		James Madison	W 66–63	10–5 (3–1)	Trask Coliseum (973); Wilmington, NC
Jan 20, 2019; 2:00 pm		Towson	W 77–73	11–5 (4–1)	Trask Coliseum (1,027); Wilmington, NC
Jan 25, 2019; 12:00 pm		at Delaware	L 53–65	11–6 (4–2)	Bob Carpenter Center (1,633); Newark, DE
Jan 27, 2019; 2:00 pm		at Drexel	L 55–67	11–7 (4–3)	Daskalakis Athletic Center (1,045); Philadelphia, PA
Feb 1, 2019; 7:00 pm		Hofstra	W 89–54	12–7 (5–3)	Trask Coliseum (788); Wilmington, NC
Feb 3, 2019; 1:00 pm		Northeastern	W 83–70	13–7 (6–3)	Trask Coliseum (634); Wilmington, NC
Feb 8, 2019; 7:00 pm		Elon	W 76–51	14–7 (7–3)	Trask Coliseum (1,122); Wilmington, NC
Feb 10, 2019; 2:00 pm		William & Mary	W 66–58	15–7 (8–3)	Trask Coliseum (945); Wilmington, NC
Feb 15, 2019; 7:00 pm		at Towson	L 61–82	15–8 (8–4)	SECU Arena (521); Towson, MD
Feb 17, 2019; 2:00 pm		at James Madison	L 51–58	15–9 (8–5)	JMU Convocation Center (2,443); Harrisonburg, VA
Feb 22, 2019; 7:00 pm		Drexel	L 53–65	15–10 (8–6)	Trask Coliseum (752); Wilmington, NC
Feb 24, 2019; 2:00 pm		Delaware	W 72–64	16–10 (9–6)	Trask Coliseum (726); Wilmington, NC
Mar 1, 2019; 7:00 pm		at Northeastern	L 54–83	16–11 (9–7)	Cabot Center (253); Boston, MA
Mar 3, 2019; 1:00 pm		at Hofstra	W 61–51	17–11 (10–7)	Hofstra Arena (462); Hempstead, NY
Mar 8, 2019; 6:30 pm		at College of Charleston	W 66–62	18–11 (11–7)	TD Arena (439); Charleston, SC
CAA Women's Tournament
Mar 14, 2019; 7:30 pm, CAA.tv	(3)	vs. (6) Northeastern; Quarterfinals	L 64–75	18–12	Bob Carpenter Center; Newark, DE
*Non-conference game. ^{#}Rankings from AP Poll. (#) Tournament seedings in parentheses. All times are in Eastern Time.

== See also ==
- 2018–19 UNC Wilmington Seahawks men's basketball team
