= 2018–19 Elon Phoenix women's basketball team =

Intercollegiate basketball season

2018–19 Elon Phoenix women's basketball
- Conference: Colonial Athletic Association
- Record: 9–21 (4–14 CAA)
- Head coach: Charlotte Smith (8th season)
- Assistant coaches: Edgar Farmer Jr.; Josh Wick; Tasha Taylor
- Home arena: Schar Center

2018–19 CAA women's basketball standings
	Conf.				Overall
Team	W		L	PCT	W		L	PCT
James Madison	17	–	1	.944	29	–	6	.829
Drexel	14	–	4	.778	24	–	9	.727
Towson †	11	–	7	.611	20	–	13	.606
Delaware	11	–	7	.611	16	–	15	.516
UNC Wilmington	11	–	7	.611	18	–	12	.600
Northeastern	9	–	9	.500	20	–	12	.625
William & Mary	7	–	11	.389	14	–	17	.452
Elon	4	–	14	.222	9	–	21	.300
Hofstra	3	–	15	.167	11	–	22	.333
Charleston	3	–	15	.167	7	–	23	.233
† 2019 CAA tournament winner As of March 31, 2019; Rankings from AP poll

The 2018–19 Elon Phoenix women's basketball team represented Elon University during the 2018–19 NCAA Division I women's basketball season. The Phoenix, led by eighth-year head coach Charlotte Smith, played their home games at the brand-new Schar Center in Elon, North Carolina as members of the Colonial Athletic Association (CAA). They finished the season 9–21, 4–14 in CAA play, to finish in eighth place. They lost in the first round of the CAA women's tournament to Hofstra.

== Roster ==
2018–19 Elon Phoenix women's basketball team
Players
Coaches

Pos.	#	Name	Height	Year	Previous school	Hometown
G	0	Brie Perpignan	5 ft 7 in (1.7 m)	Fr	Bishop O'Connell	Alexandria, VA
G	1	Saadia Munford	5 ft 6 in (1.68 m)	So	Jonesboro	Atlanta, GA
G	2	Kayla Liles	5 ft 10 in (1.78 m)	Fr	McDonogh	Owings Mills, MD
F	3	Anna Popovic	6 ft 1 in (1.85 m)	So	Charnwood	Loughborough, England
C	4	Duru Tasman	6 ft 2 in (1.88 m)	Fr	St. Timothy's	Istanbul, Turkey
G	10	Jada Graves	5 ft 9 in (1.75 m)	Jr	Thomas Edison	Alexandria, VA
F	13	Jaylin Powell	5 ft 10 in (1.78 m)	So	Rolesville	Raleigh, NC
G	21	Ariel Colon	5 ft 10 in (1.78 m)	So	Ocoee	Orlando, FL
G	22	Lexi Mercer	5 ft 9 in (1.75 m)	Jr	Rosewood	Goldsboro, NC
G	23	Ariana Nance	5 ft 9 in (1.75 m)	RS Fr	Rocky River	Charlotte, NC
F	30	Tyja Traore	6 ft 3 in (1.91 m)	Fr	Lakeside	Atlanta, GA
F	42	Emily Maupin	6 ft 3 in (1.91 m)	So	The Covenant School	Charlottesville, VA
F	52	Micaela Ryan	6 ft 1 in (1.85 m)	Fr	Buffalo Academy	Clarence Center, NY

Head coach

- Charlotte Smith (North Carolina)

Assistant coach(es)

- Edgar Farmer Jr. (North Carolina)
- Josh Wick (North Carolina)
- Tasha Taylor (Clemson)

Legend

- (C) Team captain
- (S) Suspended
- (I) Ineligible
- (W) Walk-on
- Injured
- Current redshirt

Roster
Last update: January 17, 2025

== Schedule ==
Date time, TV	Rank^{#}	Opponent^{#}	Result	Record	Site (attendance) city, state
Exhibition
October 27, 2018*; 2:00 p.m.		Belmont Abbey	W 58–54		Schar Center; Elon, NC
Non-conference regular season
November 6, 2018*; 7:00 p.m.		North Carolina	L 69–100	0–1	Schar Center (1,632); Elon, NC
November 13, 2018*; 5:30 p.m.		at North Carolina Central	W 83–54	1–1	McDougald–McLendon Gymnasium (788); Durham, NC
November 18, 2018*; 2:00 p.m., ACCNE		at Duke	L 64–81	1–2	Cameron Indoor Stadium (3,313); Durham, NC
November 20, 2018*; 6:30 p.m., ESPN+		at Appalachian State	L 62–65	1–3	Holmes Center (173); Boone, NC
November 28, 2018*; 7:00 p.m.		Chowan	W 88–74	2–3	Schar Center (301); Elon, NC
November 30, 2018*; 7:00 p.m.		Marist	L 57–61	2–4	Schar Center (413); Elon, NC
December 2, 2018*; 7:00 p.m., ESPN+		at Hampton	W 77–62	3–4	Hampton Convocation Center (2,451); Hampton, VA
December 5, 2018*; 7:00 p.m.		Davidson	W 73–72 ^{OT}	4–4	Schar Center (404); Elon, NC
December 9, 2018*; 12:00 p.m., ESPN+		at Winthrop	L 57–58	4–5	Winthrop Coliseum (107); Rock Hill, SC
December 18, 2018*; 7:00 p.m.		North Carolina A&T	W 73–64	5–5	Schar Center (357); Elon, NC
December 22, 2018*; 2:00 p.m.		Auburn	L 44–96	5–6	Schar Center (368); Elon, NC
CAA regular season
January 4, 2019; 7:00 p.m.		at Northeastern	L 71–79	5–7 (0–1)	Cabot Center (436); Boston, MA
January 6, 2019; 1:00 p.m.		at Hofstra	W 77–64	6–7 (1–1)	Hofstra Arena (375); Hempstead, NY
January 11, 2019; 7:00 p.m.		College of Charleston	W 76–68	7–7 (2–1)	Schar Center (461); Elon, NC
January 13, 2019; 2:00 p.m.		UNC Wilmington	L 70–75	7–8 (2–2)	Schar Center (919); Elon, NC
January 20, 2019; 2:00 p.m.		at William & Mary	L 60–65	7–9 (2–3)	Kaplan Arena (904); Williamsburg, VA
January 25, 2019; 7:00 p.m.		at Towson	L 58–59	7–10 (2–4)	SECU Arena (583); Towson, MD
January 27, 2019; 2:00 p.m.		at James Madison	L 30–82	7–11 (2–5)	JMU Convocation Center (3,648); Harrisonburg, VA
February 1, 2019; 7:00 p.m.		Drexel	L 44–59	7–12 (2–6)	Schar Center (467); Elon, NC
February 3, 2019; 2:00 p.m.		Delaware	L 63–74	7–13 (2–7)	Schar Center (416); Elon, NC
February 8, 2019; 7:00 p.m.		at UNC Wilmington	L 51–76	7–14 (2–8)	Trask Coliseum (1,122); Wilmington, NC
February 10, 2019; 2:00 p.m.		at College of Charleston	W 72–52	8–14 (3–8)	TD Arena (442); Charleston, SC
February 17, 2019; 1:00 p.m.		William & Mary	L 59–65	8–15 (3–9)	Schar Center (527); Elon, NC
February 22, 2019; 7:00 p.m.		James Madison	L 46–74	8–16 (3–10)	Schar Center (479); Elon, NC
February 24, 2019; 2:00 p.m.		Towson	L 50–59	8–17 (3–11)	Schar Center (421); Elon, NC
March 1, 2019; 7:00 p.m.		at Delaware	L 59–71	8–18 (3–12)	Bob Carpenter Center (1,795); Newark, DE
March 3, 2019; 2:00 p.m.		at Drexel	L 45–68	8–19 (3–13)	Daskalakis Athletic Center (848); Philadelphia, PA
March 7, 2019; 7:00 p.m.		Hofstra	W 55–52	9–19 (4–13)	Schar Center (336); Elon, NC
March 9, 2019; 2:00 p.m.		Northeastern	L 57–83	9–20 (4–14)	Schar Center (402); Elon, NC
CAA women's tournament
March 13, 2019; 12:00 p.m., CAA.tv	(8)	vs. (9) Hofstra; First round	L 75–77	9–21	Bob Carpenter Center; Newark, DE
*Non-conference game. ^{#}Rankings from AP poll. (#) Tournament seedings in parentheses. All times are in Eastern.

== See also ==
- 2018–19 Elon Phoenix men's basketball team
