= 2018–19 James Madison Dukes women's basketball team =

Intercollegiate basketball season

2018–19 James Madison Dukes women's basketball

CAA regular season champions

WNIT, Semifinals
- Conference: Colonial Athletic Association
- Record: 29–6 (17–1 CAA)
- Head coach: Sean O'Regan (3rd season)
- Assistant coaches: Bridgette Mitchell; Ian Caskill; Ashley Langford
- Home arena: JMU Convocation Center

2018–19 CAA women's basketball standings
	Conf.				Overall
Team	W		L	PCT	W		L	PCT
James Madison	17	–	1	.944	29	–	6	.829
Drexel	14	–	4	.778	24	–	9	.727
Towson †	11	–	7	.611	20	–	13	.606
Delaware	11	–	7	.611	16	–	15	.516
UNC Wilmington	11	–	7	.611	18	–	12	.600
Northeastern	9	–	9	.500	20	–	12	.625
William & Mary	7	–	11	.389	14	–	17	.452
Elon	4	–	14	.222	9	–	21	.300
Hofstra	3	–	15	.167	11	–	22	.333
Charleston	3	–	15	.167	7	–	23	.233
† 2019 CAA tournament winner As of March 31, 2019; Rankings from AP poll

The 2018–19 James Madison Dukes women's basketball team represented James Madison University during the 2018–19 NCAA Division I women's basketball season. The Dukes, led by third-year head coach Sean O'Regan, played their home games at the James Madison University Convocation Center and were members of the Colonial Athletic Association (CAA). They finished the season 29–6, 16–1 in CAA play to win the CAA regular season title. They lost in the quarterfinals of the CAA women's tournament to Hofstra. They received an automatic bid to the Women's National Invitation Tournament, where they defeated North Carolina A&T, South Florida, and Virginia Tech in the first, second and third rounds, and Georgetown in the quarterfinals, before losing to Northwestern in the semifinals.

== Roster ==
2018–19 James Madison Dukes women's basketball team
Players
Coaches

Pos.	#	Name	Height	Year	Previous school	Hometown
G	0	Nikki Oppenheimer (redshirt)	5 ft 9 in (1.75 m)	So	Montini Catholic; Syracuse	Glenview, IL
G	1	Tori Harris	6 ft 0 in (1.83 m)	So	Half Hollow Hills West	Dix Hills, NY
F	2	Jaylin Carodine	5 ft 10 in (1.78 m)	Fr	St. John's College	Abingdon, MD
G	3	Kamiah Smalls	5 ft 10 in (1.78 m)	Jr	Neumann Goretti	Philadelphia, PA
G	4	Madison Green	5 ft 6 in (1.68 m)	Fr	Millbrook	Winchester, VA
F	5	Breyenne Bellerand	5 ft 10 in (1.78 m)	So	Immaculate Conception	Emerson, NJ
G	10	Aneah Young	5 ft 11 in (1.8 m)	Sr	Baltimore Polytechnic Institute	Baltimore, MD
G	13	Logan Reynolds	5 ft 7 in (1.7 m)	Sr	Central	Norton, VA
G	14	Eleanore Marciszewski	6 ft 0 in (1.83 m)	Fr	Dawson College	Sainte-Julie, QC
G	15	Lexie Barrier	5 ft 10 in (1.78 m)	Jr	Ironton	Ironton, OH
C	31	Kayla Cooper-Williams	6 ft 2 in (1.88 m)	RS Jr	C. D. Hylton	Dumfries, VA
F	41	Casey Irvine	6 ft 1 in (1.85 m)	Fr	Spotswood	Penn Laird, VA
F	42	Devon Merritt	6 ft 2 in (1.88 m)	Jr	Berks Catholic	Reading, PA
G	55	Jackie Benitez	5 ft 10 in (1.78 m)	RS Jr	Pocono Mountain West; Siena	Tobyhanna, PA

Head coach

- Sean O'Regan (James Madison)

Assistant coach(es)

- Bridgette Mitchell (Duke)
- Ian Caskill (James Madison)
- Ashley Langford (Tulane)

Legend

- (C) Team captain
- (S) Suspended
- (I) Ineligible
- (W) Walk-on
- Injured
- Current redshirt

Roster
Last update: December 23, 2017

== Schedule ==
Date time, TV	Rank^{#}	Opponent^{#}	Result	Record	Site (attendance) city, state
Exhibition
Nov 3, 2018*; 2:00 pm		Post	W 95–44		JMU Convocation Center; Harrionsburg, VA
Non-conference regular season
Nov 8, 2018*; 7:00 pm		George Washington	W 50–37	1–0	JMU Convocation Center (1,898); Harrisonburg, VA
Nov 13, 2018*; 7:00 pm		at Delaware State	W 103–57	2–0	Memorial Hall (362); Dover, DE
Nov 16, 2018*; 7:00 pm		Georgetown	W 69–57	3–0	JMU Convocation Center (1,927); Harrisonburg, VA
Nov 20, 2018*; 7:00 pm		at Hampton	L 65–72	3–1	Hampton Convocation Center (2,123); Hampton, VA
Nov 25, 2018*; 2:00 pm		Winthrop	W 56–39	4–1	JMU Convocation Center (1,844); Harrisonburg, VA
Nov 29, 2018*; 7:00 pm, ESPN+		at Liberty	W 74–53	5–1	Vines Center (1,217); Lynchburg, VA
Dec 3, 2018*; 7:00 pm		Dayton	W 68–55	6–1	JMU Convocation Center (1,829); Harrisonburg, VA
Dec 8, 2018*; 12:00 pm		at No. 7 Maryland	L 63–87	6–2	Xfinity Center (4,357); College Park, MD
Dec 17, 2018*; 11:00 am, ACCNE		at Wake Forest	L 49–50	6–3	LJVM Coliseum (9,786); Winston-Salem, NC
Dec 21, 2018*; 2:00 pm		St. John's	W 64–51	7–3	JMU Convocation Center (2,154); Harrisonburg, VA
Dec 30, 2018*; 12:00 pm		at Robert Morris	W 59–36	8–3	North Athletic Complex (418); Moon Township, PA
CAA regular season
Jan 4, 2019; 7:00 pm, NBCSWA		at Delaware	W 68–43	9–3 (1–0)	Bob Carpenter Center (1,172); Newark, DE
Jan 6, 2019; 2:00 pm		at Drexel	W 51–35	10–3 (2–0)	Daskalakis Athletic Center (629); Philadelphia, PA
Jan 11, 2019; 7:00 pm		Hofstra	W 77–54	11–3 (3–0)	JMU Convocation Center (1,922); Harrisonburg, VA
Jan 13, 2019; 2:00 pm		Northeastern	W 84–49	12–3 (4–0)	JMU Convocation Center (1,840); Harrisonburg, VA
Jan 18, 2019; 7:00 pm		at UNC Wilmington	L 63–66	12–4 (4–1)	Trask Coliseum (973); Wilmington, NC
Jan 20, 2019; 2:00 pm		at College of Charleston	W 91–50	13–4 (5–1)	TD Arena (350); Charleston, SC
Jan 25, 2019; 7:00 pm		William & Mary	W 65–48	14–4 (6–1)	JMU Convocation Center (2,234); Harrisonburg, VA
Jan 27, 2019; 2:00 pm		Elon	W 82–30	15–4 (7–1)	JMU Convocation Center (3,648); Harrisonburg, VA
Feb 3, 2019; 2:00 pm		Towson	W 71–59	16–4 (8–1)	JMU Convocation Center (2,406); Harrisonburg, VA
Feb 8, 2019; 7:00 pm		at Northeastern	W 58–51	17–4 (9–1)	Cabot Center (495); Boston, MA
Feb 10, 2019; 2:00 pm		at Hofstra	W 59–44	18–4 (10–1)	Hofstra Arena (1,022); Hempstead, NY
Feb 15, 2019; 12:00 pm		College of Charleston	W 76–35	19–4 (11–1)	JMU Convocation Center (1,819); Harrisonburg, VA
Feb 17, 2019; 2:00 pm		UNC Wilmington	W 58–51	20–4 (12–1)	JMU Convocation Center (2,453); Harrisonburg, VA
Feb 22, 2019; 7:00 pm		at Elon	W 74–46	21–4 (13–1)	Schar Center (479); Elon, NC
Feb 24, 2019; 2:00 pm		at William & Mary	W 78–65	22–4 (14–1)	Kaplan Arena (744); Williamsburg, VA
Mar 3, 2019; 2:00 pm		at Towson	W 63–56	23–4 (15–1)	SECU Arena (752); Towson, MD
Mar 7, 2019; 7:00 pm		Drexel	W 58–47	24–4 (16–1)	JMU Convocation Center (2,097); Harrisonburg, VA
Mar 9, 2019; 2:00 pm		Delaware	W 56–51	25–4 (17–1)	JMU Convocation Center (3,091); Harrisonburg, VA
CAA Women's Tournament
Mar 14, 2019; 12:00 pm, CAA.tv	(1)	vs. (9) Hofstra; Quarterfinals	L 50–57	25–5	Bob Carpenter Center; Newark, DE
WNIT
Mar 22, 2019*; 7:00 pm		North Carolina A&T; First Round	W 48–37	26–5	JMU Convocation Center (1,120); Harrisonburg, VA
Mar 24, 2019*; 6:00 pm		South Florida; Second Round	W 71–54	27–5	JMU Convocation Center (986); Harrisonburg, VA
Mar 28, 2019*; 7:00 pm		Virginia Tech; Third Round	W 70–66	28–5	JMU Convocation Center (2,872); Harrisonburg, VA
Mar 31, 2019*; 2:00 pm		Georgetown; Quarterfinals	W 54–44	29–5	JMU Convocation Center (2,074); Harrisonburg, VA
Apr 3, 2019*; 7:00 pm		Northwestern; Semifinals	L 69–74	29–6	JMU Convocation Center (1,992); Harrisonburg, VA
*Non-conference game. ^{#}Rankings from AP Poll. (#) Tournament seedings in parentheses. All times are in Eastern Time.

== Rankings ==
Regular season polls
Poll	Pre- season	Week 2	Week 3	Week 4	Week 5	Week 6	Week 7	Week 8	Week 9	Week 10	Week 11	Week 12	Week 13	Week 14	Week 15	Week 16	Week 17	Week 18	Week 19	Final
AP																				N/A
Coaches																RV	RV		RV	

Legend
	Increase in ranking
	Decrease in ranking
	Not ranked previous week
(RV)	Received votes
(NR)	Not ranked

== See also ==
- 2018–19 James Madison Dukes men's basketball team
