= 2018–19 William & Mary Tribe women's basketball team =

Intercollegiate basketball season

2018–19 William & Mary Tribe women's basketball
- Conference: Colonial Athletic Association
- Record: 14–17 (7–11 CAA)
- Head coach: Ed Swanson (6th season)
- Assistant coaches: Lynne-Ann Kokoski; Chanel Murchison; Tierra Rudd
- Home arena: Kaplan Arena

2018–19 CAA women's basketball standings
	Conf.				Overall
Team	W		L	PCT	W		L	PCT
James Madison	17	–	1	.944	29	–	6	.829
Drexel	14	–	4	.778	24	–	9	.727
Towson †	11	–	7	.611	20	–	13	.606
Delaware	11	–	7	.611	16	–	15	.516
UNC Wilmington	11	–	7	.611	18	–	12	.600
Northeastern	9	–	9	.500	20	–	12	.625
William & Mary	7	–	11	.389	14	–	17	.452
Elon	4	–	14	.222	9	–	21	.300
Hofstra	3	–	15	.167	11	–	22	.333
Charleston	3	–	15	.167	7	–	23	.233
† 2019 CAA tournament winner As of March 31, 2019; Rankings from AP poll

The 2018–19 William & Mary Tribe women's basketball team represented The College of William & Mary during the 2018–19 NCAA Division I women's basketball season. The Tribe, led by sixth year head coach Ed Swanson, played their home games at Kaplan Arena and were members of the Colonial Athletic Association (CAA). They finished the season 14–17, 7–11 in CAA play to finish in seventh place. They advanced to the quarterfinals of the CAA women's tournament, where they lost to Drexel.

== Roster ==
2018–19 William & Mary Tribe women's basketball team
Players
Coaches

Pos.	#	Name	Height	Year	Previous school	Hometown
G	0	Libby Underwood	5 ft 9 in (1.75 m)	So	Portsmouth	Rye, NH
G	1	Sydney Wagner (redshirt)	5 ft 6 in (1.68 m)	So	Spring-Ford Senior; Stetson	Phoenixville, PA
G	2	Bianca Boggs	5 ft 8 in (1.73 m)	Sr	St. Mary's Ryken	Waldolf, MD
G	3	Ashley Taylor	6 ft 0 in (1.83 m)	Jr	St. Anne's-Belfield	Charlottesville, VA
G/F	5	Misha Jones	5 ft 9 in (1.75 m)	Sr	Battlefield	Manassas Park, VA
G	10	Eva Hodgson	5 ft 9 in (1.75 m)	Fr	New Hampton School	Rindge, NH
G	11	Nyla Pollard	5 ft 9 in (1.75 m)	So	Princess Anne	Virginia Beach, VA
G	12	Harper Birdsong	5 ft 10 in (1.78 m)	RS So	Nansemond-Suffolk Academy; George Washington	Suffolk, VA
F	15	Emma Krause	6 ft 2 in (1.88 m)	Fr	Cardinal Gibbons	Plantation, FL
C	20	Chandler Smith	6 ft 3 in (1.91 m)	Sr	St. Mary's Ryken	Port Tobacco, MD
G/F	21	Bailey Eichner	6 ft 1 in (1.85 m)	So	Cudhay	Cudahy, WI
C	25	Gabby Rogers	6 ft 1 in (1.85 m)	So	Bishop Lynch	Dallas, TX
F	30	Victoria Reynolds	5 ft 10 in (1.78 m)	Jr	Archbishop Spalding	Pasadena, MD
C	32	Caroline Stover	6 ft 3 in (1.91 m)	Fr	Cardinal Spellman	Plympton, MA

Head coach

- Ed Swanson (Sacred Heart)

Assistant coach(es)

- Chanel Murchison (William & Mary)
- Lynne-Ann Kokoski (Bryant)
- Tierra Rudd (Winston-Salem State)

Legend

- (C) Team captain
- (S) Suspended
- (I) Ineligible
- (W) Walk-on
- Injured
- Current redshirt

Roster

== Schedule ==
Date time, TV	Rank^{#}	Opponent^{#}	Result	Record	Site (attendance) city, state
Non-conference regular season
Nov 6, 2018*; 7:00 pm		VCU	L 55–72	0–1	Kaplan Arena (684); Williamsburg, VA
Nov 12, 2018*; 7:00 pm		Howard	W 88–75	1–1	Kaplan Arena (564); Williamsburg, VA
Nov 17, 2018*; 2:00 pm		at Loyola (MD)	W 65–49	2–1	Reitz Arena (352); Baltimore, MD
Nov 24, 2018*; 5:00 pm, ESPN+		at Davidson	L 65–76	2–2	John M. Belk Arena (412); Davidson, NC
Nov 27, 2018*; 7:00 pm		East Carolina	W 63–43	3–2	Kaplan Arena (574); Williamsburg, VA
Nov 30, 2018*; 7:00 pm, ESPN+		at Hartford	L 45–50	3–3	Chase Arena at Reich Family Pavilion (649); West Hartford, CT
Dec 2, 2018*; 2:00 pm		at Fairfield	W 60–54	4–3	Alumni Hall (627); Fairfield, CT
Dec 5, 2018*; 7:00 pm, YurView		Richmond	W 65–55	5–3	Kaplan Arena (634); Williamsburg, VA
Dec 8, 2018*; 4:00 pm		at Old Dominion; Rivalry	L 69–83	5–4	Kaplan Arena (1,802); Williamsburg, VA
Dec 21, 2018*; 2:00 pm		at Norfolk State	W 55–44	6–4	Joseph G. Echols Memorial Hall (246); Norfolk, VA
Dec 29, 2018*; 2:00 pm		George Washington	W 73–59	7–4	Kaplan Arena (611); Williamsburg, VA
CAA regular season
Jan 4, 2019; 7:00 pm		at Hofstra	W 60–55	8–4 (1–0)	Hofstra Arena (323); Hempstead, NY
Jan 6, 2019; 2:00 pm		at Northeastern	L 74–88	8–5 (1–1)	Cabot Center (540); Boston, MA
Jan 11, 2019; 7:00 pm		UNC Wilmington	W 70–64	9–5 (2–1)	Kaplan Arena (657); Williamsburg, VA
Jan 13, 2019; 2:00 pm		College of Charleston	L 54–66	9–6 (2–2)	Kaplan Arena (582); Williamsburg, VA
Jan 20, 2019; 2:00 pm		Elon	W 65–60	10–6 (3–2)	Kaplan Arena (904); Williamsburg, VA
Jan 25, 2019; 7:00 pm		at James Madison	L 48–65	10–7 (3–3)	JMU Convocation Center (2,234); Harrisonburg, VA
Jan 27, 2019; 2:00 pm		at Towson	W 80–69	11–7 (4–3)	SECU Arena (609); Towson, MD
Feb 1, 2019; 7:00 pm		Delaware	L 59–70	11–8 (4–4)	Kaplan Arena (634); Williamburg, VA
Feb 2, 2019; 2:00 pm		Drexel	L 58–62	11–9 (4–5)	Kaplan Arena (962); Williamburg, VA
Feb 8, 2019; 11:30 am		at College of Charleston	L 77–79 ^{2OT}	11–10 (4–6)	TD Arena (3,031); Charleston, SC
Feb 10, 2019; 2:00 pm		at UNC Wilmington	L 58–66	11–11 (4–7)	Trask Coliseum (945); Wilmington, NC
Feb 17, 2019; 1:00 pm		at Elon	W 65–59	12–11 (5–7)	Schar Center (527); Elon, NC
Feb 22, 2019; 7:00 pm		Towson	L 75–82	12–12 (5–8)	Kaplan Arena (727); Williamsburg, VA
Feb 24, 2019; 2:00 pm		James Madison	L 65–78	12–13 (5–9)	Kaplan Arena (744); Williamsburg, VA
Mar 1, 2019; 7:00 pm		at Drexel	W 77–72 ^{3OT}	13–13 (6–9)	Daskalakis Athletic Center (628); Philadelphia, PA
Mar 3, 2019; 2:00 pm		Delaware	L 52–68	13–14 (6–10)	Bob Carpenter Center (2,281); Newark, DE
Mar 7, 2019; 7:00 pm		Northeastern	L 71–75	13–15 (6–11)	Kaplan Arena (515); Williamsburg, VA
Mar 9, 2019; 2:00 pm		Hofstra	W 83–72	13–16 (7–11)	Kaplan Arena (609); Williamsburg, VA
CAA Women's Tournament
Mar 13, 2019; 2:30 pm, CAA.tv	(7)	vs. (10) College of Charleston; First Round	W 61–41	14–16	Bob Carpenter Center; Newark, DE
Mar 14, 2019; 5:00 pm, CAA.tv	(7)	vs. (2) Drexel; Quarterfinals	L 60–71	14–17	Bob Carpenter Center; Newark, DE
*Non-conference game. ^{#}Rankings from AP Poll. (#) Tournament seedings in parentheses. All times are in Eastern Time.

== See also ==
2018–19 William & Mary Tribe men's basketball team
