= 2019 CAA women's basketball tournament =

- Classification: Division I
- Season: 2018–19
- Teams: 10
- Site: Bob Carpenter Center; Newark, Delaware
- Champions: Towson (1st title)
- Television: CAA.tv
- CAA women's basketball tournaments

2018–19 CAA women's basketball standings
| | Conf. | | | | Overall |
| Team | W | | L | PCT | W | | L | PCT |
|---|---|---|---|---|---|---|---|---|
| James Madison | 17 | – | 1 | .944 | 29 | – | 6 | .829 |
| Drexel | 14 | – | 4 | .778 | 24 | – | 9 | .727 |
| Towson † | 11 | – | 7 | .611 | 20 | – | 13 | .606 |
| Delaware | 11 | – | 7 | .611 | 16 | – | 15 | .516 |
| UNC Wilmington | 11 | – | 7 | .611 | 18 | – | 12 | .600 |
| Northeastern | 9 | – | 9 | .500 | 20 | – | 12 | .625 |
| William & Mary | 7 | – | 11 | .389 | 14 | – | 17 | .452 |
| Elon | 4 | – | 14 | .222 | 9 | – | 21 | .300 |
| Hofstra | 3 | – | 15 | .167 | 11 | – | 22 | .333 |
| Charleston | 3 | – | 15 | .167 | 7 | – | 23 | .233 |
† 2019 CAA tournament winner As of March 31, 2019; Rankings from AP poll

The 2019 Colonial Athletic Association women's basketball tournament is the postseason women's basketball tournament for the Colonial Athletic Association (CAA) for the 2018–19 NCAA Division I women's basketball season. The tournament was held March 13–16, 2019 at the Bob Carpenter Center in Newark, Delaware. The champion received the CAA's automatic bid to the NCAA tournament. Towson won the conference tournament championship game over Drexel, 53–49 to send Towson to their first ever NCAA tournament.

== Seeds ==
All 10 CAA teams participated in the tournament. Teams were seeded by conference record, with a tiebreaker system used to seed teams with identical conference records. The top six teams received a bye to the quarterfinals. JMU Drexel and Towson have secured first round byes

| Seed | School | Conf. | Tiebreaker 1 | Tiebreaker 2 | Tiebreaker 3 |
|---|---|---|---|---|---|
| 1 | James Madison | 17–1 | | | |
| 2 | Drexel | 14–4 | | | |
| 3 | UNC Wilmington | 11–7 | 2–2 vs. TOW, DEL | 1–1 vs. JMU | |
| 4 | Towson | 11–7 | 2–2 vs. TOW, UNCW | 0–2 vs. JMU | 1–1 vs. DREXEL |
| 5 | Delaware | 11–7 | 2–2 vs. UNCW, TOW | 0–2 vs. JMU | 0–2 vs. DREXEL |
| 6 | Northeastern | 9–9 | | | |
| 7 | William & Mary | 7–11 | | | |
| 8 | Elon | 4–14 | | | |
| 9 | Hofstra | 3–15 | 1–1 vs. HOF | 2–0 vs. NU | |
| 10 | Charleston | 3–15 | 1–1 vs. CHAR | 0–2 vs. NU | |

== Schedule ==
| Session | Game | Time* | Matchup | Score | Television |
First round – Wednesday March 13, 2019
| 1 | 1 | 12:00 pm | No. 9 Hofstra vs. No. 8 Elon | 77–75 | CAA.tv |
| 1 | 2 | 2:30 pm | No. 10 Charleston vs. No. 7 William & Mary | 41–61 | CAA.tv |
Quarterfinals – Thursday March 14, 2019
| 2 | 3 | 12:00 pm | No. 9 Hofstra vs. No. 1 James Madison | 57–50 | CAA.tv |
| 2 | 4 | 2:30 pm | No. 5 Delaware vs. No. 4 Towson | 49–59 | CAA.tv |
| 3 | 5 | 5:00 pm | No. 7 William & Mary vs. No. 2 Drexel | 60–71 | CAA.tv |
| 3 | 6 | 7:30 pm | No. 6 Northeastern vs. No. 3 UNC Wilmington | 75–64 | CAA.tv |
Semifinals – Friday March 15, 2019
| 4 | 7 | 1:00 pm | No. 9 Hofstra vs. No. 4 Towson | 48–69 | CAA.tv |
| 4 | 8 | 4:00 pm | No. 2 Drexel vs. No. 6 Northeastern | 73–69^{OT} | CAA.tv |
Championship – Saturday March 16, 2019
| 5 | 9 | 1:00 pm | No. 2 Drexel vs. No. 4 Towson | 49–53 | CBS Sports Live |
*Game times in ET. Rankings denote tournament seed

== Bracket ==
First round Wednesday, March 13; CAA.tv
8 | Elon | 75
9 | Hofstra | 77
7 | William & Mary | 61
10 | Charleston | 41

Quarterfinals; Thursday, March 14; CAA.tv
1 | James Madison | 50
9 | Hofstra | 57
4 | Towson | 59
5 | Delaware | 49
2 | Drexel | 71
7 | William & Mary | 60
3 | UNC Wilmington | 64
6 | Northeastern | 75

Semifinals; Friday, March 15; CAA.tv
9 | Hofstra | 48
4 | Towson | 69
2 | Drexel | 73*
6 | Northeastern | 69

Final; Saturday, March 16; CAA.tv
4 | Towson | 53
2 | Drexel | 49

* denotes overtime game

== See also ==
- 2019 CAA men's basketball tournament
