= Falmouth Academy =

Coordinates: 41°33′35.45″N 70°37′23.55″W

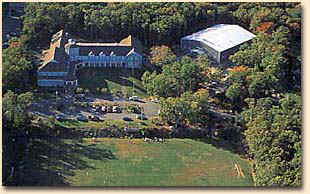
- Falmouth, Massachusetts, United States

Information
- Type: Private
- Established: 1977
- Headmaster: Steven D. Lisk
- Faculty: 59
- Grades: 7-12
- Enrollment: 177 (2025-2026)
- Average class size: 11
- Student to teacher ratio: 4:1
- Campus size: 34 acres
- Campus type: Rural
- Colors: Blue and white
- Team name: Mariners
- Website: https://www.falmouthacademy.org/

Falmouth Academy is a non-profit, coed, independent, private college-preparatory day and 5-day boarding school serving students from grades 7–12. It is located in Falmouth, Massachusetts on Cape Cod.

== History ==
Falmouth Academy was founded in 1977 as a small and rigorously academic day school. Its first classes were held in the basement of a retirement home; two years later, it moved to another rental property on the Massachusetts Military Reservation in Bourne, Massachusetts.

In 1985, Josiah K. Lilly III (son of Josiah K. Lilly Jr.) gave Falmouth Academy 34 acres (140,000 m^{2}) next to prime conservation land, nearer to the town center and between Falmouth centers for medicine and the arts. Four years later, the school moved into the new 16-classroom building in time for the opening of the 1989–1990 school year.

Since then, the school's building has undergone five significant renovations. A gymnasium was added to accommodate its sports teams and physical education classes in 1997. Then, a three-story, 15,000-square-foot (1,400 m^{2}) addition in 2006 that included science labs, art rooms, offices, a student resource room, and a library, which was named in honor of its longest-serving headmaster Bruce Buxton. In 2014–2015, a 3,600-square-foot meeting hall, named Morse Hall, was added for school meetings and community events. In July 2017, the school celebrated the grand opening of the Simon Center for the Arts, a 7,200 square foot space comprising a state-of-the-art theater, the Gordon T. Heald Music Room, a Green Room, a Set Design Shop, a Technical Control Room, and a Gallery. In July 2022, a school archives room and IT room were added.

The current head of school at Falmouth Academy is Steven D. Lisk, who was appointed in 2026.

== Academics ==
Falmouth Academy defines itself as a "reading and writing school", but its diverse curriculum also includes mathematics, science, and the arts. Its core curriculum requires each student to take English, history, and science classes, and take foreign language and mathematics classes for at least five years (assuming the student has attended for all eligible years). Seniors who have already completed the required number of mathematics can opt to take a rhetoric and public speaking class, though it is not required. There is also a strong focus on the skills of writing, close reading, research, and effective management of time. Cooperative learning and independent research are also central to the curriculum. Students may take four to five elective courses each year, including physical education for middle schoolers and a science fair class for those below 10th grade, in addition to their core academic courses.

The average class size is thirteen students, and most of its graduates go to highly competitive colleges. Currently, the college acceptance rate at Falmouth Academy is 100%. Falmouth Academy is a member of the National Association of Independent Schools and the Association of Independent Schools in New England. It has been accredited by the New England Association of Schools and Colleges.

== Athletics ==
Falmouth Academy offers six sports: Soccer and cross country in the fall, Basketball in the winter, and Lacrosse, tennis, and sailing in the spring.

After 25 years in the New England Preparatory School Athletic Council small divisions, Falmouth Academy jointed the Massachusetts Interscholastic Athletic Association and the Cape & Islands League in 2014. The girls basketball and girls lacrosse teams won the league championships in 2014, 2015 2016, 2017, and 2018. The boys lacrosse team were the 2021 league champions.

== Arts ==
Falmouth Academy offers a variety of arts, including visual arts, music, and drama.

Visual arts and music are offered as electives, with multiple levels of studio and ceramic arts, and several musical ensembles, including an instrumental ensemble, a choral group, and an a cappella There are public community concerts held at the end of the fall, winter, and spring trimesters.

Falmouth Academy has three scholastic theater productions per year, and hosts other productions in the Simon Center theater.

== Student body ==
Students come from a broad area of southeastern Massachusetts that is roughly bordered by Martha’s Vineyard, Mattapoisett, Middleboro, Duxbury, and Brewster. The school has also hosted more than 60 international students from about 24 countries.
