= Lebanon Catholic School =

Private Catholic school in Lebanon, Pennsylvania, US

Location
- 1400 Chestnut Street; Lebanon, (Lebanon County), Pennsylvania 17042; United States; 40°20′13″N 76°26′5″W

Information
- Type: Private, Coeducational
- Motto: Wisdom Through Mary
- Religious affiliation: Roman Catholic
- Established: 1929
- NCES School ID: 01191841
- Principal: Deb Waters
- Grades: PreK-12
- Colors: Navy Blue and White
- Mascot: Beavers
- Team name: Beavers
- Accreditation: Middle States Association of Colleges and Schools
- Athletic Director: Joseph Shay
- Website: lebanoncatholicschool.org

Lebanon Catholic School was a private, Roman Catholic high school in Lebanon, Pennsylvania, United States. It was located in the Roman Catholic Diocese of Harrisburg. It closed in 2020.

== History ==
Lebanon Catholic High School was established in 1929 and moved to its current location in 1959 when it became a Diocesan high school, serving six parishes in the area.

The history of Lebanon Catholic High School began with the parish school of the Assumption of the Blessed Virgin Mary Church in Lebanon, Pennsylvania. Rev. Antonius M. Grundner, O.S.B.V.M., established the school in 1859.

=== Willow Street ===
Lay teachers maintained the original school, followed in quick succession by the Sisters, Servants of the Immaculate Heart of Mary in 1861, and the Sisters of Mercy in 1869. In 1870, the Sisters of Saint Joseph took charge of the elementary school, and by 1876, six Sisters cared for 200 students. The pastor was Rev. Aloysius F. Kuhlman. In 1926, it became necessary to formulate plans for a new building that would accommodate a greater number of students seeking admission into the parish school. Facilities were also needed to provide for a Catholic High School. The new building on Willow Street was dedicated on June 3, 1929, with Msgr. Adam Christ as pastor. The second floor of the building contained high school classrooms, science laboratories, and facilities for a commercial course. The first graduating class numbered 18, while Msgr. John F. Lawley was pastor.

=== Assumption Hill ===
By 1950, it was evident that the parish school building would not be adequate for increased enrollments. In 1953, the number of students in both schools was well over 1100, including 380 students in the high school. A building fund was officially launched by Msgr. Paul D. Weaver on December 8, 1954. The site for the new Lebanon Catholic High School was to be Assumption Hill; land on Chestnut Street purchased in 1949. On April 9, 1956, the Most Reverend George L. Leech, Bishop of Harrisburg, created a diocesan institution out of what had been a parochial high school. This meant that five other parishes would lend their support to the proposed new building, and thus a Board of Pastors was also created. On October 11, 1959, the new Lebanon Catholic High School on Assumption Hill was dedicated by the Most Reverend Egidio Vagnozzi, Apostolic Delegate to the United States. The first principal of the present school was Rev. Joseph C. Hilbert. Enrollment was 113, with a faculty of nine Sisters of St. Joseph and eight lay teachers.

=== Timeline ===
For the 1963/1964 school year, enrollment was 700 students, the highest figure in Lebanon Catholic’s history. In September 1964, three Sisters of Saints Cyril and Methodius joined the faculty, and one Daughter of Mercy became a member of the faculty in 1976.

The Board of Pastors, the governing body since 1956, was expanded to include lay representatives from the supporting parishes and faculty and student representatives in September 1971. The Daughters of Mercy withdrew in 1982. The Sisters of Saints Cyril and Methodius officially withdrew from Lebanon Catholic in 1987.

In September 1989, Lebanon Catholic became a Junior-Senior High School with the addition of 7th and 8th grades. The opening enrollment that year was 265 students.

In August 2001, Our Lady of the Valley Elementary School (Grades K – 6) and Lebanon Catholic Jr-Sr High School consolidated into one K – 12 entity, Lebanon Catholic School. To accommodate this merger, modular classrooms were placed on the grounds to extend the upper floor space to house grades 3 – 6. The opening enrollment for the 2001 – 2002 school year was 485 students.

In the years prior to April 2020, the number of students had declined. That month, the school had around 350 students. The school closed in 2020.

Our Lady of the Cross School had plans to open in North Lebanon Township circa 2021, as a way of replacing LCS.

By June 2022, the former campus of Lebanon Catholic had deteriorated to the point where Pat Huggins of the Lebanon Daily News called it "shameful". By then, a land developer had purchased the land with the purpose of building apartments on it.
