= Aliyah Collier =

American basketball player (born 1997)

No. 5 – Crvena zvezda
- Position: Guard
- League: Basketball League of Serbia; EuroLeague Women

Personal information
- Born: September 6, 1997 (age 29)
- Listed height: 5 ft 11 in (1.80 m)

Career information
- High school: Lucy Craft Laney (Augusta, Georgia)
- College: Clemson (2015–2019)
- Playing career: 2019–present

Career history
- 2019–2020: União Sportiva
- 2020–2021: Kouvottaret
- 2021–2023: Njarðvík
- 2023: Colegio Los Leones Quilpe
- 2023–2024: Bodrum Basketbol
- 2024–2026: Guangdong Vermilion Birds
- 2026–present: Crvena zvezda

Career highlights
- Icelandic champion (2022); Icelandic Super Cup (2022); Úrvalsdeild Playoffs MVP (2022); Úrvalsdeild scoring leader (2023); 2× Úrvalsdeild rebounding leader (2022, 2023)

Aliyah A'taeya Collier (born September 6, 1997) is an American basketball player. A 5'9" guard, she played college basketball for Clemson University where she was an ACC All-Tournament Second Team in 2019. Following her college career, she went on to play professionally in Europe. In 2022, she won the Icelandic championship with Njarðvík and was named the Playoffs MVP.

== High school career ==
Collier grew up in Augusta, Georgia and attended Lucy Craft Laney High School where she starred at basketball and helped the team to the state title game in 2013 and 2015, winning it in her senior season after posting 19 points, 8 assists and 7 steals in the championship game. For the season, she averaged 16.3 points, 9.8 rebounds, 5.5 assists and 5.5 steals.

== College career ==
Collier played college basketball for Clemson from 2015 to 2019. She was named to the ACC All-Tournament Second Team in her senior season.

== Professional career ==
In 2019, Collier signed with Clube União Sportiva of the Portuguese Liga Feminina de Basquetebol. She helped the team post the best defense in the league, allowing only 57.5 points per game before the season was canceled due to the COVID-19 pandemic in Portugal. Sportiva finished third in the league and also went to the Cup Finals where it lost to Quinta dos Lombos. Collier finished as the league's third best scorer with 19.4 points per game while also averaging 9.9 rebounds, 4.7 assists and 3.1 steals per game.

The following season, she signed with Kouvottaret of the Finnish Naisten Korisliiga. In 29 games, she averaged 15.4 points and 11.2 rebounds per game.

In July 2021, Collier signed with newly promoted Njarðvík of the Icelandic Úrvalsdeild kvenna. She led Njarðvík to the semi-finals of the Icelandic Cup where they lost to eventual winners Haukar. After Njarðvík started hot, it faded towards the end of the season and finished with the fourth best record in the league. In the playoffs, it knocked out first-place Fjölnir in the semi-finals, 3–1, and advanced to the Úrvalsdeild finals for the first time since 2012. In the finals, Njarðvík faced Haukar and took the first game behind Collier's 31 points and 20 rebounds, where she became the first player to achieve a 30–20 game in the Úrvalsdeild finals history. After posting 21 points and 13 rebounds in Njarðvík's game two loss, she had 38 points and 20 rebounds in Njarðvík's game three victory. In game four she posted 27 points and 20 rebounds in Njarðvík's 51–60 loss. In game five, she led Njarðvík to the national championship and was named the Playoffs MVP after posting 24 points and 25 rebounds in the deciding game. Following the finals, she signed a 1-year extension with Njarðvík.

On 18 September 2022, she led Njarðvík to victory in the annual Icelandic Super Cup after posting 45 points and 29 rebounds in the 94–87 victory against Haukar.

In the Úrvalsdeild, she led the league in scoring and rebounds, averaging 22.1 points and 12.7 rebounds per game. On 14 December 2022, she scored a season high 40 points and tied a season high of 21 rebounds while also having 7 assists and 7 steals against Haukar. On 18 January 2023, she had a triple-double against Grindavík, with 23 points, 13 rebounds and 10 assists. During the regular season, she led the league in points, rebounds and blocks with averages of 22.1 points, 12.7 rebounds and 1.6 blocks, while also averaging 5.8 assist and 4.0 steals per game. She suffered a season ending injury in the first game of Njarðvík's first round series against Keflavík. Without her, Njarðvík lost the series 1–3.

== Career statistics ==
Legend
| GP | Games played | GS | Games started | MPG | Minutes per game | RPG | Rebounds per game |
| APG | Assists per game | SPG | Steals per game | BPG | Blocks per game | PPG | Points per game |
| TO | Turnovers per game | FG% | Field-goal percentage | 3P% | 3-point field-goal percentage | FT% | Free-throw percentage |
| **Bold** | Career best | ° | League leader |

=== College ===
| Year | Team | GP | GS | MPG | FG% | 3P% | FT% | RPG | APG | SPG | BPG | TO | PPG |
|---|---|---|---|---|---|---|---|---|---|---|---|---|---|
| 2015–16 | Clemson | **30** | **20** | 23.3 | 38.4 | 25.0 | 59.0 | 6.0 | 1.3 | 1.4 | 0.4 | 3.5 | 7.3 |
| 2016–17 | Clemson | 29 | **20** | **25.5** | **49.6** | 30.8 | 63.1 | **7.9** | 1.0 | 1.6 | **0.9** | **2.8** | 10.0 |
| 2017–18 | Clemson | 19 | 8 | 22.4 | 35.3 | 25.0 | **69.8** | 5.4 | 1.3 | 2.1 | 0.6 | 3.1 | 8.1 |
| 2018–19 | Clemson | 24 | 5 | 22.2 | 41.6 | **35.1** | 66.7 | 7.0 | **1.8** | **2.3** | 0.7 | 3.6 | **12.6** |
| **Career** | | 102 | 53 | 23.5 | 41.7 | 31.9 | 64.0 | 6.6 | 1.3 | 1.8 | 0.6 | 3.2 | 9.5 |
Statistics retrieved from Sports-Reference.
