= Schar Center =

American university sports arena

- Interactive map of Schar Center
- Location: 2500 Campus Box, Elon, NC 27244
- Coordinates: 36.1080°N 79.5108°W
- Capacity: 5,100
- Surface: Hardwood

Construction
- Opened: July 2018

Tenant
- Elon Phoenix

The Schar Center is a multi-purpose arena in Elon, North Carolina on the campus of Elon University. It is home to the school's men's and women's basketball and volleyball teams and replaced Alumni Gym in 2018. The arena's capacity is 5,100.
