= International High School of San Francisco =

Coordinates: 37.775381°N 122.421907°W

International High School

Location
- 150 Oak Street; San Francisco, California 94102; United States

Information
- Type: Private, Coeducational
- Established: 1962
- Principal: Allegra Molineaux
- Head of school: Melinda Bihn
- Faculty: 65
- Enrollment: 390 (2017-18)
- Average class size: 16
- Campus: Urban
- Color: Red/Blue
- Athletics: 10 sports, 20 teams
- Athletics conference: BCL Central
- Mascot: Joel the Jaguar
- Website: www.internationalsf.org

International High School of San Francisco (also known as International), is a private co-educational high school in Hayes Valley, San Francisco, California, United States, and part of The International School of San Francisco. Graduates earn either the International Baccalaureate ("IB") or the French Baccalaureate ("French Bac"). The IB curriculum is primarily taught in English, while the French Bac is primarily taught in French.

A common misconception is that French is required to attend IHS. This is not true. Non-French speakers follow the IB curriculum. Approximately two-thirds to three-quarters of the students graduate with the IB diploma. (The IB is an internationally recognized degree program, with the fastest growth coming in the United States. Stuart Hall/Convent in San Francisco and Berkeley High School are two schools in the Bay Area that also offer the IB diploma.) IB and French Bac graduates earn substantial college credit from pursuing these programs. Many graduates attend respected universities.

The IHS faculty is recruited from all over the world and represents over 20 nationalities. The average number of years of teaching experience is just under 20, and more than 80% of the faculty hold master's degrees or higher.

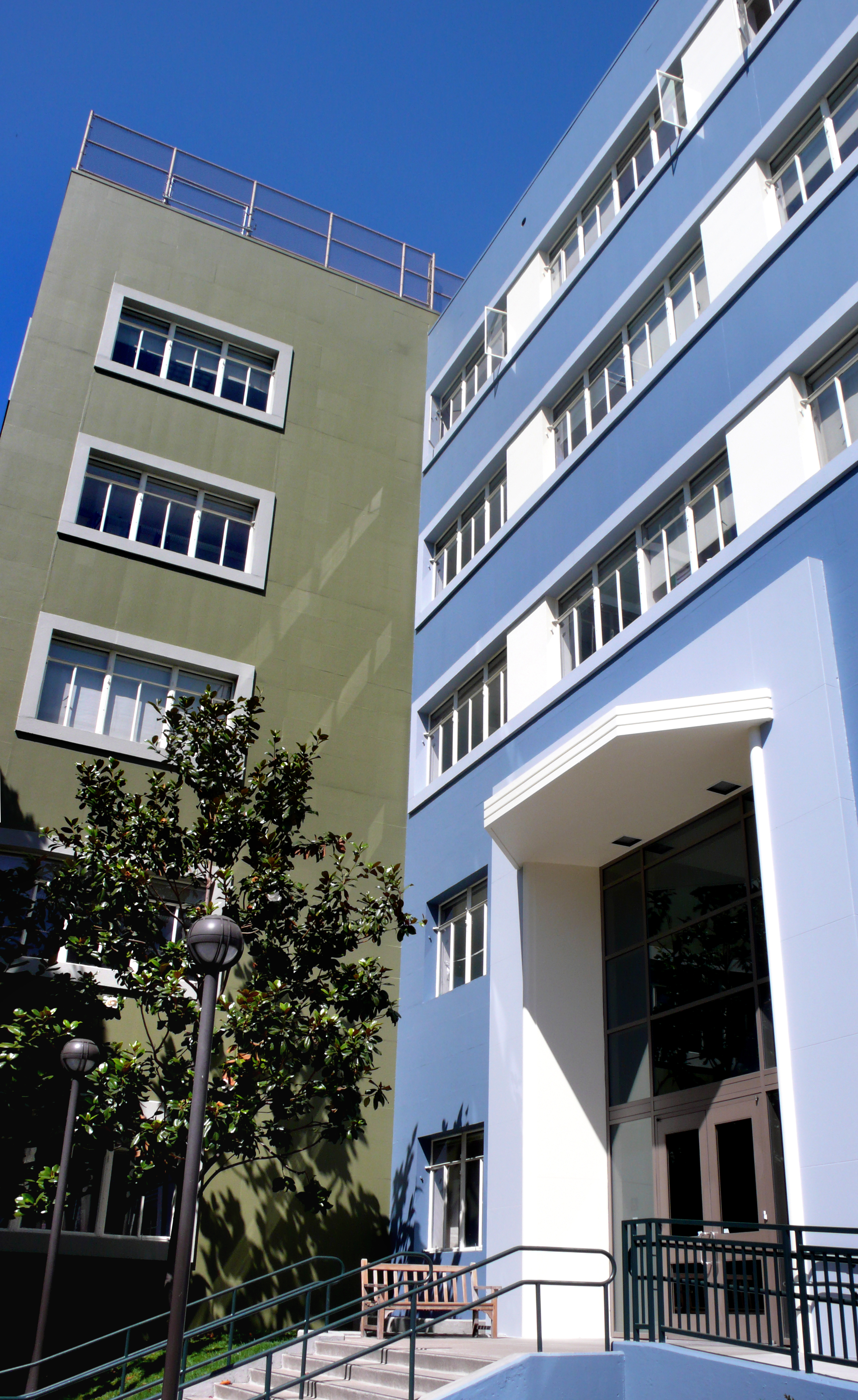
The Main Campus at 150 Oak St.

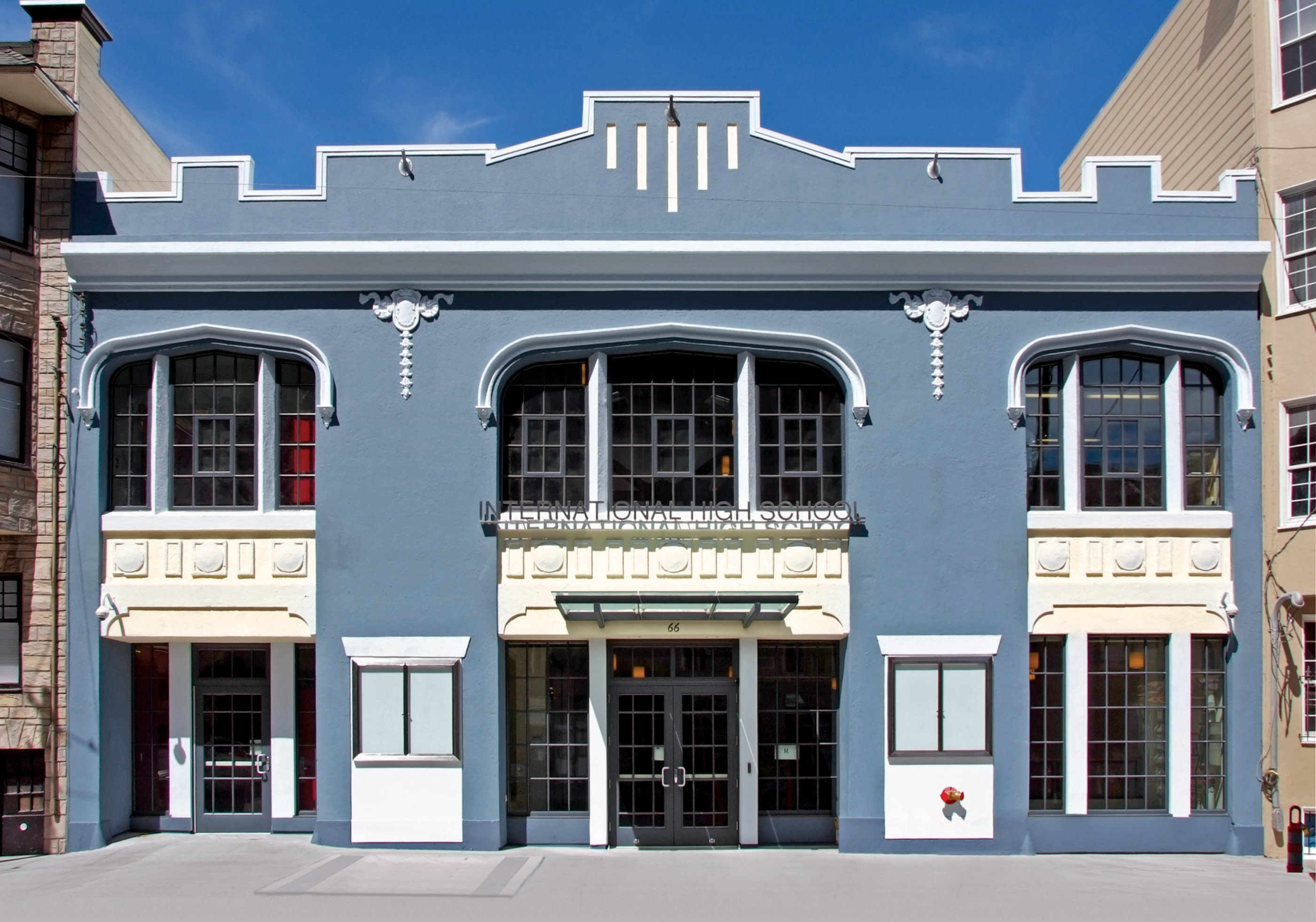
The Arts Pavilion at 66 Page St.

== Campus ==
International High School's campus consists of a main building at 150 Oak Street, a gymnasium and outdoor recreational space across the street, and an Arts Pavilion on 66 Page Street. The school has acquired the lots at 98 Franklin and 84 Page and is currently in the process of selecting designs for the development of an expanded urban campus. The main building at Oak Street houses classrooms and science labs, teacher workrooms, administrative offices, the library, the design lab, as well as the rooftop deck. The Arts Pavilion houses the music, film, visual arts, and theater programs. The lower floors of the main building house Chinese American International School and French American International School, both K-8 schools.

== Student body ==
Each entering class at International is composed of 90-100 students. In the past few years, there have been around 250 applications for the approximately 50 open spots in the entering freshman class. (The remaining 40-50 students that made up the entering class came from the affiliated French-American K-8 school.) Incoming students arrive at IHS from the following middle schools in the Bay Area, among others:

a) Independent schools: Presidio Hill, SF Day, Hamlin, Live Oak, Town, Burke, Friends, Adda Clevenger, Children's Day, Marin Country Day, Alta Vista, Head Royce (Oakland), Redwood Day (Oakland), Bentley (Oakland)

b) Parochial/Religious schools: Cathedral, Stuart Hall, Convent, Brandeis, Zion Lutheran, St. Thomas More, Notre Dame des Victoires, St. Paul Episcopal, Holy Spirit

c) Bilingual schools: Chinese American International School, Ecole Bilingue de Berkeley, Lycée Français de San Francisco, International School of the Peninsula

d) Public schools: Alice Fong Yu, Aptos, Everett, Gateway, Hoover, Kipp Bridge, Lawton, Presidio, Rooftop, Mill Valley Middle, Crocker Middle (Hillsborough) Ingrid Lacy (Pacifica), Fernando Rivera (Daly City)

A small number of students enter from schools abroad. Over 30% of the families receive financial aid.

== Languages ==
The school offers extensive language offerings in French, Chinese, Spanish, Italian, and Arabic. Students are able to take native level classes in French and Chinese (and Spanish if there is sufficient demand) beginning in their freshman year. For IB students in 11th and 12th grade, the school offers both Level A (native/bilingual level) and Level B (non-native) courses in French and Chinese. (The school offers Level A in Spanish when there is sufficient demand.) Spanish, Italian, and Arabic are offered at non-native levels in both the IB and French Bac. All students take a minimum of four years of a language other than English; many take a third language as well. All of the language teachers are native in the tongue that they teach.

== Global travel ==
International High School's students make yearly cultural, service oriented, and linguistic trips to multiple destinations across the world. The extensive travel program at IHS is unique in the Bay Area. In 2017-18, groups of 10-20 students from grades 9 to 11 will travel to Vietnam, China and Tibet, Denmark and Germany, the American South, England, Ecuador, Galapagos Islands, Tahiti, Senegal, Thailand, and India and Myanmar for approximately two weeks. The school also offers longer 6 to 8 week exchanges intended to enhance the students’ globally focused education outside the classroom and enrich their linguistic proficiency. The trips often consist of exchange programs in which IHS students are hosted by local families in the foreign country. In 2015-16, IHS students had the opportunity to undertake exchanges in France (Paris, Bordeaux, Tahiti), Spain, Bolivia, and Peru. In return, IHS families host students from the various foreign countries in their homes in San Francisco.

== Service learning ==
Service learning is an integral part of the curriculum at International as it is a core component of the IB diploma program. Students perform at least 100 hours of service activities throughout their years at IHS. The service component culminates with a month-long Creativity Action Service (CAS) project fully organized by each student. Examples of CAS projects in the past have been: an annual student-run TEDx program, a student organized community development project in Nicaragua, a fundraising evening of music and food for the Chigoli organization in Malawi, a student-organized and run summer volleyball class for girls at John Muir Elementary, a student founded and led LGBT club ("LASER") to raise consciousness about LGBT issues, among many others. The school partners with an extensive list of non-profit organizations that the students regularly become engaged with, including Amigos de las Americas, Breakthrough San Francisco, Family House, Habitat for Humanity, John Muir Elementary After School Beacon Program, My Yute Soccer, Reading Partners, Rocket Dog Rescue, and Teens Teaching Elders Technology, among others. The student body is also active in annual blood drives for Blood Centers of the Pacific, day-long volunteer efforts at the S.F. Food Bank, and others.

IHS is also known for its international community service projects, most prominently raising money to build schools in Jemjem Legabatu, Ethiopia, and M'bour, Senegal. Each year, students at International organize an evening of musical performances by students and faculty known as Songs for Senegal to raise funds to support École Natangué in Senegal. IHS has had a key role in the construction and growth of École Natangué.

== Athletics ==
International sponsors twenty athletic teams that compete with other high schools throughout the San Francisco Bay Area. As of 2021-22, the school competes in the BCL Central league in team sports. Scott Kennedy joined the school as Athletic Director in 2015-16, after 16 years at Mission High School. Scott is the recipient of several leadership and coaching awards, including the California State Athletic Directors Association "Athletic Director of the Year" Award and the Positive Coaching Alliance "National Double-Goal Coach" Award. The athletic program at IHS consists of eleven different sports at the Varsity and Junior Varsity levels (including two clubs sports - sailing and skiing) and around 55 percent of the student body participates in athletics throughout the academic year. The sports are as follows:

Fall: co-ed cross country (varsity and JV), men's soccer (varsity and JV), women's tennis (varsity and JV), women's volleyball (varsity and JV), sailing (varsity and JV)

Winter: men's basketball (varsity and JV), women's basketball (varsity and JV)

Spring: co-ed badminton (varsity), co-ed swimming (varsity), co-ed track (varsity), men's baseball (varsity), men's tennis (varsity and JV), women's soccer (varsity)

== Arts ==
Students at International have the option of taking art - whether it be music, theater, visual arts, or film - in each of their four years. In 9th grade, students explore two art forms, one each semester. In 10th grade, each student chooses one art form for a deeper exploration lasting the entire year. In 11th grade, students can choose to continue with a two-year art course as part of the IB Diploma. This IB art course is a rigorous exploration at the same level of depth and commitment as any of the other five IB courses taken by each student. (The five other IB courses fall in the following categories: English Literature, Mathematics, Science, Humanities/Social Science, and a Second Language other than English.) Thus, many students take art for four years at International. (If a student does not choose the art course, the "sixth course" as it is known can be in any of the other academic disciplines, e.g., a second Science course or a second Humanities course.)

International opened the Dennis Gallagher Arts Pavilion in September 2009. The Pavilion includes a black-box theater, a state-of-the-art film and video editing classroom, as well as music and visual arts studios. Student engage in a broad range of artistic activities and classes there: from writing and directing one act plays to making short films, from painting murals to composing music. The arts are not limited to classes during the regular school day. The Visual Arts department puts on exhibitions throughout the year, with the work of the IB visual arts students prominently on display at the March Arts Reception and at the end-of-year May Arts Festival. The after school performing arts program includes theater and music.

== Design Technology ==
The school offers Design Technology courses beginning in the freshman year (required for all entering students) and continuing in 10th and in the IB years (11th and 12th) as an optional elective. The freshman course includes a coding component taught by a computer science teacher. The IB Design Technology course incorporates elements of physics, engineering, and art and design. The school partners with SF's Tech Shop in offering its IB design courses and participates in the Maker Faire in San Mateo, California.

== Accreditation ==
International High School is accredited by the Western Association of Schools and Colleges, the French Ministry of Education, the International Baccalaureate Organization, and the National Association of Independent Schools, and Council of International Schools.

== See also ==
- San Francisco high schools
