= 2018–19 Brown Bears women's basketball team =

Intercollegiate basketball season

2018–19 Brown Bears women's basketball
- Conference: Ivy League
- Record: 9–21 (1–13 Ivy)
- Head coach: Sarah Behn (5th season)
- Assistant coaches: Eddie Benton; Sara Binkhorst; Kanika Cummings
- Home arena: Pizzitola Sports Center

2018–19 Ivy League women's basketball standings
	Conf.				Overall
Team	W		L	PCT	W		L	PCT
Penn	12	–	2	.857	24	–	6	.800
Princeton *†	12	–	2	.857	22	–	10	.688
Harvard	9	–	5	.643	17	–	12	.586
Yale	6	–	8	.429	16	–	13	.552
Dartmouth	6	–	8	.429	13	–	14	.481
Cornell	6	–	8	.429	12	–	14	.462
Columbia	4	–	10	.286	8	–	19	.296
Brown	1	–	13	.071	9	–	21	.300
† 2019 Ivy League Tournament winner * Tournament #1 seed As of March 23, 2019; Rankings from AP Poll

The 2018–19 Brown Bears women's basketball team represented Brown University during the 2018–19 NCAA Division I women's basketball season. The Bears, led by fifth year head coach Sarah Behn, played their home games at the Pizzitola Sports Center and were members of the Ivy League. They finished the season at 9–21, 1–13 to finish in last place. They failed to qualify for the Ivy League women's tournament.

== Roster ==
2018–19 Brown Bears women's basketball team
Players
Coaches

Pos.	#	Name	Height	Year	Previous school	Hometown
G/F	0	Alana Kelley	6 ft 0 in (1.83 m)	Fr	Desert Mountain	Phoenix, AZ
G/F	1	Nina Mehta	6 ft 0 in (1.83 m)	Fr	International	San Francisco, CA
G	3	Dominique Leonidas	5 ft 5 in (1.65 m)	So	Parkview	Stone Mountain, GA
G/F	4	Justine Gaziano	6 ft 0 in (1.83 m)	Jr	Natick	Natick, MA
F	5	Morgan Clausen	6 ft 0 in (1.83 m)	So	Huntley	Algonquin, IL
G	10	Taylor Will	5 ft 11 in (1.8 m)	Sr	Prespect	Arlington Heights, IL
G/F	11	Savannah Lewis	6 ft 0 in (1.83 m)	So	Sierra Canyon	Westlake Village, CA
G	12	McKenna Dale	6 ft 0 in (1.83 m)	So	Edwin O. Smith	Storrs, CT
F	20	Ashley Ducharme	6 ft 1 in (1.85 m)	Fr	Noble and Greenough School	Milton, MA
G	21	Travia Breedlove	5 ft 8 in (1.73 m)	Fr	Our Lady of Mercy	Rochester, NY
G	22	Randi Richardson	5 ft 5 in (1.65 m)	Jr	Carman-Ainsworth	Flint, MI
F	24	Mary Butler	6 ft 2 in (1.88 m)	Sr	Bangor	Bangor, ME
G	30	Shayna Mehta	5 ft 7 in (1.7 m)	Sr	International	San Francisco, CA
F	31	Erika Steeves	6 ft 2 in (1.88 m)	Sr	Phillips Exeter Academy	Montreal, QE
G	33	Maddie Mullin	5 ft 9 in (1.75 m)	Fr	Beaver Country Day School	Wellesley, NY
F/C	42	Haley Green	6 ft 3 in (1.91 m)	Jr	Glenvar	Salem, VA

Head coach

- Sarah Behn (Boston College)

Assistant coach(es)

- Eddie Benton (Vermont)
- Sara Binkhorst (Bowdoin)
- Kanika Cummings (Siena)

Legend

- (C) Team captain
- (S) Suspended
- (I) Ineligible
- (W) Walk-on
- Injured
- Current redshirt

Roster

== Schedule ==
Date time, TV	Rank^{#}	Opponent^{#}	Result	Record	Site (attendance) city, state
Non-conference regular season
Nov 6, 2018*; 7:00 pm, ESPN+		Central Connecticut	W 68–63	1–0	Pizzitola Sports Center (305); Providence, RI
Nov 8, 2018*; 7:00 pm		at Bryant; Ocean State Cup	L 57–75	1–1	Chace Athletic Center (573); Smithfield, RI
Nov 12, 2018*; 7:00 pm, NESN		at Boston University	L 51–72	1–2	Case Gym (471); Boston, MA
Nov 15, 2018*; 7:00 pm, ESPN+		New Hampshire	W 76–70	2–2	Pizzitola Sports Center (471); Providence, RI
Nov 18, 2018*; 12:00 pm, NESN+		at Holy Cross	W 89–85	3–2	Hart Center (672); Worcester, MA
Nov 23, 2018*; 4:00 pm, ESPN+		Fairfield; Brown University Turkey Tip-Off	W 68–49	4–2	Pizzitola Sports Center (436); Providence, RI
Nov 24, 2018*; 2:00 pm, ESPN+		Massachusetts; Brown University Turkey Tip-Off	L 61–90	4–3	Pizzitola Sports Center; Providence, RI
Nov 25, 2018*; 1:00 pm, ESPN+		Bucknell; Brown University Turkey Tip-Off	L 78–91	4–4	Pizzitola Sports Center (927); Providence, RI
Nov 27, 2018*; 7:00 pm, ESPN+		Johnson & Wales	W 78–46	5–4	Pizzitola Sports Center (207); Providence, RI
Dec 1, 2018*; 2:00 pm		vs. Bryant; Ocean State Tip-Off Tournament semifinals	W 78–46	6–4	Ryan Center (426); Providence, RI
Dec 2, 2018*; 2:00 pm		at Rhode Island; Ocean State Tip-Off Tournament championship	L 67–72	6–5	Ryan Center (420); Providence, RI
Dec 8, 2018*; 1:00 pm, ESPN+		at Maine	L 96–102 ^{OT}	6–6	Cross Insurance Center (2,128); Bangor, ME
Dec 30, 2018*; 3:00 pm		at Chicago State	W 90–65	7–6	Jones Convocation Center (350); Chicago, IL
Dec 31, 2018*; 2:00 pm, ESPN+		at Northern Illinois	L 102–109	7–7	Convocation Center (411); DeKalb, IL
Jan 2, 2019*; 2:00 pm		at Adelphi	W 75–62	8–7	Center for Recreation and Sports (100); Garden City, NY
Jan 4, 2019*; 4:00 pm		at Rutgers	L 72–73	8–8	Louis Brown Athletic Center (1,449); Piscataway, NJ
Ivy League regular season
Jan 18, 2019; 11:00 am, ESPN+/NESN		Yale	W 86–71	9–8 (1–0)	Pizzitola Sports Center (1,141); Providence, RI
Jan 26, 2019; 2:00 pm, ESPN3		at Yale	L 72–84	9–9 (1–1)	John J. Lee Amphitheater (702); New Haven, CT
Feb 1, 2019; 6:30 pm, ESPN+		Dartmouth	L 61–81	9–10 (1–2)	Pizzitola Sports Center (1,141); Providence, RI
Feb 2, 2019; 4:30 pm, ESPN+		Harvard	L 83–100	9–11 (1–3)	Pizzitola Sports Center (623); Providence, RI
Feb 8, 2019; 7:00 pm, ESPN+		at Penn	L 43–83	9–12 (1–4)	Palestra (671); Philadelphia, PA
Feb 9, 2019; 5:00 pm, ESPN+		at Princeton	L 74–93	9–13 (1–5)	Jadwin Gymnasium (1,180); Princeton, NJ
Feb 15, 2019; 7:00 pm, ESPN3		Cornell	L 53–65	9–14 (1–6)	Pizzitola Sports Center (355); Providence, RI
Feb 16, 2019; 7:00 pm, ESPN+/NESN		Columbia	L 81–83	9–15 (1–7)	Pizzitola Sports Center (506); Providence, RI
Feb 22, 2019; 7:00 pm, ESPN+		at Harvard	L 55–98	9–16 (1–8)	Lavietes Pavilion (708); Cambridge, MA
Feb 23, 2019; 5:30 pm, ESPN+/NESN+		at Dartmouth	L 43–78	9–17 (1–9)	Leede Arena (637); Hanover, NH
Mar 1, 2019; 7:00 pm, ESPN+/SNY		at Columbia	L 62–93	9–18 (1–10)	Levien Gymnasium (667); New York, NY
Mar 2, 2019; 5:00 pm, ESPN+		at Cornell	L 48–66	9–19 (1–11)	Newman Arena; Ithaca, NY
Mar 8, 2019; 7:00 pm, ESPN+		Princeton	L 68–88	9–20 (1–12)	Pizzitola Sports Center (541); Providence, RI
Mar 9, 2019; 6:00 pm, ESPN+		Penn	L 53–75	9–21 (1–13)	Pizzitola Sports Center (631); Providence, RI
*Non-conference game. ^{#}Rankings from AP Poll. (#) Tournament seedings in parentheses. All times are in Eastern Time.

== See also ==
- 2018–19 Brown Bears men's basketball team
