= 2018–19 Penn Quakers women's basketball team =

Intercollegiate basketball season

2018–19 Penn Quakers women's basketball

Ivy League regular season co-champions

WNIT, second round
- Conference: Ivy League
- Record: 24–7 (12–2 Ivy)
- Head coach: Mike McLaughlin (9th season)
- Assistant coaches: Kelly Killion; Bernadette Laukaitis
- Home arena: Palestra

2018–19 Ivy League women's basketball standings
	Conf.				Overall
Team	W		L	PCT	W		L	PCT
Penn	12	–	2	.857	24	–	6	.800
Princeton *†	12	–	2	.857	22	–	10	.688
Harvard	9	–	5	.643	17	–	12	.586
Yale	6	–	8	.429	16	–	13	.552
Dartmouth	6	–	8	.429	13	–	14	.481
Cornell	6	–	8	.429	12	–	14	.462
Columbia	4	–	10	.286	8	–	19	.296
Brown	1	–	13	.071	9	–	21	.300
† 2019 Ivy League Tournament winner * Tournament #1 seed As of March 23, 2019; Rankings from AP Poll

The 2018–19 Penn Quakers women's basketball team represented the University of Pennsylvania during the 2018–19 NCAA Division I women's basketball season. The Quakers, led by tenth-year head coach Mike McLaughlin, played their home games at the Palestra and were members of the Ivy League. They finished the season 24–7, 12–2 in Ivy League play, to share the Ivy League regular-season title with Princeton. They advanced to the championship game of the Ivy League women's tournament where they lost to Princeton. They received an automatic trip to the Women's National Invitation Tournament where they defeated American in the first before losing to Providence in the second round.

== Roster ==
2018–19 Penn Quakers women's basketball team
Players
Coaches

Pos.	#	Name	Height	Year	Previous school	Hometown
G	2	Katie Kinum	5 ft 9 in (1.75 m)	So	New Providence	New Providence, NJ
G	3	Michae Jones	5 ft 8 in (1.73 m)	So	E.D. White Catholic	Thibodaux, LA
F	4	Kennedy Suttle	6 ft 0 in (1.83 m)	Fr	Holy Innocents' Episcopal	Atlanta, GA
G	5	Sereena Weledji	6 ft 0 in (1.83 m)	Fr	Saint Thomas Aquinas	Overland Park, KS
G	11	Kendall Grasela	5 ft 10 in (1.78 m)	Jr	Germantown Academy	Huntingdon Valley, PA
G	14	Meg Hair	6 ft 0 in (1.83 m)	Fr	James-DeWitt	Syracuse, NY
F	15	Liz Satter	6 ft 2 in (1.88 m)	Jr	Loyola Academy	Glencoe, IL
G	21	Mia Lakstigala	5 ft 11 in (1.8 m)	Fr	Naperville Central	Naperville, IL
G	22	Deja Jackson	5 ft 8 in (1.73 m)	Sr	Grinnell	Grinnell, IA
G	23	Kristen Daley	6 ft 1 in (1.85 m)	Sr	The Rivers School	Sharon, MA
F	24	Tori Crawford	6 ft 2 in (1.88 m)	So	Bullis School	Potomac, MD
G	25	Ashley Russell	5 ft 10 in (1.78 m)	Sr	Braintree	Braintree, MA
C	31	Eleah Parker	6 ft 4 in (1.93 m)	So	Northside Christian Academy	Charlotte, NC
G	33	Phoebe Sterba	6 ft 1 in (1.85 m)	Jr	Magnificat	Cleveland, OH
F	34	Christina Dicindio	6 ft 2 in (1.88 m)	So	West Windsor-Plainsboro	West Windsor, NJ
C	40	Emily Anderson	6 ft 4 in (1.93 m)	Jr	South Fayette	Bridgeville, PA
C	44	Noelle Cahill	6 ft 4 in (1.93 m)	Fr	Regis Jesuit	Parker, CO
F	50	Princess Aghayere	6 ft 0 in (1.83 m)	Sr	South Lakes	Reston, VA

Head coach

- Mike McLaughlin (Holy Family)

Assistant coach(es)

- Kelly Killion (Holy Family)
- Bernadette Laukaitis (Holy Family)

Legend

- (C) Team captain
- (S) Suspended
- (I) Ineligible
- (W) Walk-on
- Injured
- Current redshirt

Roster
Last update: July 13, 2024

== Schedule ==
Date time, TV	Rank^{#}	Opponent^{#}	Result	Record	Site (attendance) city, state
Regular season
November 10, 2018*; 2:00 p.m.		at Siena	W 58–51	1–0	Alumni Recreation Center (1,019); Loudonville, NY
November 12, 2018*; 7:00 p.m., ACCNE		at No. 1 Notre Dame	L 55–78	1–1	Edmund P. Joyce Center (7,854); South Bend, IN
November 15, 2018*; 7:00 p.m., ESPN+		Saint Joseph's	W 65–45	2–1	Palestra (354); Philadelphia, PA
November 17, 2018*; 2:00 p.m., ESPN+		NJIT	W 85–42	3–1	Palestra (405); Philadelphia, PA
November 24, 2018*; 1:00 p.m.		at Navy; Navy Classic semifinals	W 65–61	4–1	Alumni Hall (414); Annapolis, MD
November 25, 2018*; 3:15 p.m.		vs. Maine; Navy Classic championship game	L 46–47	4–2	Alumni Hall (368); Annapolis, MD
December 5, 2018*; 7:00 p.m., NBCSPHI/ESPN+		La Salle	W 65–34	5–2	Palestra (449); Philadelphia, PA
December 8, 2018*; 1:00 p.m., ESPN3		at Iona	W 66–43	6–2	Hynes Athletic Center (583); New Rochelle, NY
December 21, 2018*; 11:30 a.m.		at Drexel; Battle of 33rd Street	W 55–39	7–2	Daskalakis Athletic Center (1,625); Philadelphia, PA
December 31, 2018*; 11:00 a.m., ESPN+		at Stetson	W 75–53	8–2	Edmunds Center (263); DeLand, FL
January 5, 2019; 2:00 p.m., NBCSPHI+/ESPN+		at Princeton	W 66–60	9–2 (1–0)	Jadwin Gymnasium (1,104); Princeton, NJ
January 16, 2019*; 7:00 p.m., NBCSPHI+/ESPN+		Villanova	L 50–58	9–3	Palestra (263); Philadelphia, PA
January 23, 2019*; 7:00 p.m., ESPN+		Temple	W 71–62	10–3	Palestra (437); Philadelphia, PA
January 27, 2019*; 1:00 p.m., ESPN+		Haverford	W 81–46	11–3	Palestra (734); Philadelphia, PA
February 1, 2019; 7:00 p.m., ESPN+		at Cornell	W 59–46	12–3 (2–0)	Newman Arena (1,741); Ithaca, NY
February 2, 2019; 5:30 p.m., ESPN+		at Columbia	W 72–60	13–3 (3–0)	Levien Gymnasium (713); New York, NY
February 8, 2019; 7:00 p.m., ESPN+		Brown	W 83–43	14–3 (4–0)	Palestra (671); Philadelphia, PA
February 9, 2019; 6:00 p.m., NBCSPHI+/ESPN+		Yale	W 54–48	15–3 (5–0)	Palestra (903); Philadelphia, PA
February 15, 2019; 6:00 p.m., ESPN+		at Dartmouth	W 60–44	16–3 (6–0)	Leede Arena (733); Hanover, NH
February 16, 2019; 5:00 p.m., ESPN+		at Harvard	L 72–80 ^{2OT}	16–4 (6–1)	Lavietes Pavilion (1,636); Cambridge, MA
February 22, 2019; 5:30 p.m., ESPN+		Columbia	W 79–56	17–4 (7–1)	Palestra (2,906); Philadelphia, PA
February 23, 2019; 4:30 p.m., ESPN+		Cornell	W 69–58	18–4 (8–1)	Palestra (4,298); Philadelphia, PA
February 26, 2019; 7:00 p.m., ESPN3		Princeton	L 53–68	18–5 (8–2)	Palestra (683); Philadelphia, PA
March 1, 2019; 7:00 p.m., ESPN+		Harvard	W 80–75 ^{OT}	19–5 (9–2)	Palestra (568); Philadelphia, PA
March 2, 2019; 6:00 p.m., ESPN3		Dartmouth	W 56–52	20–5 (10–2)	Palestra (812); Philadelphia, PA
March 8, 2019; 6:00 p.m., ESPN+		at Yale	W 65–56	21–5 (11–2)	John J. Lee Amphitheater (927); New Haven, CT
March 9, 2019; 6:00 p.m., ESPN+		at Brown	W 75–53	22–5 (12–2)	Pizzitola Sports Center (631); Providence, RI
Ivy League women's tournament
March 16, 2019; 8:30 p.m., ESPN3	(2)	vs. (3) Harvard; Semifinals	W 91–62	23–5	John J. Lee Amphitheater; New Haven, CT
March 17, 2019; 4:00 p.m., ESPNU	(2)	vs. (1) Princeton; Championship game	L 54–65	23–6	John J. Lee Amphitheater; New Haven, CT
WNIT
March 22, 2019*; 7:00 p.m.		American; First round	W 64–45	24–6	Palestra (817); Philadelphia, PA
March 24, 2019*; 4:00 p.m.		at Providence; Second round	W 54–6	24–7	Alumni Hall (511); Providence, RI
*Non-conference game. ^{#}Rankings from AP poll. (#) Tournament seedings in parentheses. All times are in Eastern.

== See also ==
- 2018–19 Penn Quakers men's basketball team
