= 2018–19 Yale Bulldogs women's basketball team =

Intercollegiate basketball season

2018–19 Yale Bulldogs women's basketball

FAU Holiday Classic Champions
- Conference: Ivy League
- Record: 16–13 (6–8 Ivy)
- Head coach: Allison Guth (4th season)
- Assistant coaches: Danielle Brown; Emma Golen; Lashay Banks
- Home arena: John J. Lee Amphitheater

2018–19 Ivy League women's basketball standings
	Conf.				Overall
Team	W		L	PCT	W		L	PCT
Penn	12	–	2	.857	24	–	6	.800
Princeton *†	12	–	2	.857	22	–	10	.688
Harvard	9	–	5	.643	17	–	12	.586
Yale	6	–	8	.429	16	–	13	.552
Dartmouth	6	–	8	.429	13	–	14	.481
Cornell	6	–	8	.429	12	–	14	.462
Columbia	4	–	10	.286	8	–	19	.296
Brown	1	–	13	.071	9	–	21	.300
† 2019 Ivy League Tournament winner * Tournament #1 seed As of March 23, 2019; Rankings from AP Poll

The 2018–19 Yale Bulldogs women's basketball team represented Yale University during the 2018–19 NCAA Division I women's basketball season. The Bulldogs, led by fourth year head coach Allison Guth, played their home games at John J. Lee Amphitheater of the Payne Whitney Gymnasium as members of the Ivy League. They finished the season at 16–13, 6–8 to finish in a 3 way tie for fourth place. Due to a tie breaker loss to Cornell and Dartmouth they failed to qualify for the Ivy League women's tournament.

== Roster ==
2018–19 Yale Bulldogs women's basketball team
Players
Coaches

Pos.	#	Name	Height	Year	Previous school	Hometown
G	1	Ale Aguirre	5 ft 8 in (1.73 m)	So	The Bishop's School	La Jolla, CA
F	2	Camilla Emsbo	6 ft 5 in (1.96 m)	Fr	Lakewood	Lakewood, CO
G	4	Megan Gorman	6 ft 1 in (1.85 m)	Jr	Vero Beach	Vero Beach, FL
G	5	Mackenzie Hewitt	5 ft 5 in (1.65 m)	Fr	Prosper	McKinney, TX
G/F	10	Gabby Nelson (C)	6 ft 0 in (1.83 m)	Sr	Birdville	Hurst, TX
G	12	Robin Gallagher	5 ft 10 in (1.78 m)	Fr	Athens Drive	Cary, NC
F	15	Alex Cade	6 ft 1 in (1.85 m)	So	Laurel School	Shaker Heights, OH
G	21	Roxy Barahman	5 ft 8 in (1.73 m)	Jr	Oaks Christian	Calabasas, CA
G/F	22	Aerial Chavarin	5 ft 10 in (1.78 m)	Jr	Bishop O'Dowd	Oakland, CA
G	23	Tori Andrew	5 ft 10 in (1.78 m)	So	Orono Senior	Wayzata, MN
F	24	Ellen Margaret Andrews	5 ft 10 in (1.78 m)	So	Greenhill School	Dallas, TX
F	25	Alexandra Maund	5 ft 11 in (1.8 m)	Sr	Noble and Greenough	Dorchester, MA
F	32	Erin Hill	6 ft 2 in (1.88 m)	Fr	Tabor Academy	Edgartown, MA
G	33	Roxanne Nesbitt	5 ft 6 in (1.68 m)	Fr	Univ. of Chicago Laboratory	Chicago, IL
F	40	Brownyn Davies	5 ft 11 in (1.8 m)	Jr	Wayland	Wayland, MA
C	44	Jessica Lezon	6 ft 6 in (1.98 m)	Jr	North Reading	North Reading, MA

Head coach

- Allison Guth (Illinois)

Assistant coach(es)

- Danielle Brown (Kean)
- Emma Golen (Harvard)
- Lashay Banks (Rider)

Legend

- (C) Team captain
- (S) Suspended
- (I) Ineligible
- (W) Walk-on
- Injured
- Current redshirt

Roster

== Schedule ==
Date time, TV	Rank^{#}	Opponent^{#}	Result	Record	Site (attendance) city, state
Non-conference regular season
Nov 6, 2018*; 6:00 pm, ESPN+		Colgate	W 80–61	1–0	John J. Lee Amphitheater (301); New Haven, CT
Nov 8, 2018*; 7:00 pm, ESPN+		at Northern Illinois; Preseason WNIT First Round	L 80–89	1–1	Convocation Center (615); DeKalb, IL
Nov 16, 2018*; 5:00 pm		vs. Niagara; Preseason WNIT consolation round	W 67–64	2–1	William R. Johnson Coliseum (433); Nacogdoches, TX
Nov 17, 2018*; 5:30 pm		at Stephen F. Austin; Preseason WNIT consolation round	L 57–67	2–2	William R. Johnson Coliseum (1,307); Nacogdoches, TX
Nov 21, 2018*; 7:00 pm		at Cincinnati	L 52–66	2–3	Fifth Third Arena (809); Cincinnati, OH
Nov 23, 2018*; 7:00 pm, ESPN+		at Youngstown State	W 58–56	3–3	Beeghly Center (1,201); Youngstown, OH
Nov 27, 2018*; 5:30 pm		at Wagner	W 74–41	4–3	Spiro Sports Center (361); Staten Island, NY
Nov 29, 2018*; 7:00 pm		at Providence	L 42–59	4–4	Alumni Hall (356); Providence, RI
Dec 4, 2018*; 6:00 pm, ESPN+		Saint Peter's	W 72–56	5–4	John J. Lee Amphitheater (507); New Haven, CT
Dec 6, 2018*; 7:00 pm, ESPN3		at St. John's	L 52–56	5–5	Carnesecca Arena (704); Queens, NY
Dec 8, 2018*; 2:00 pm, ESPN+		at Vermont	W 58–55	6–5	Patrick Gym (556); Burlington, VT
Dec 11, 2018*; 7:00 pm		at Army	W 61–51	7–5	Christl Arena (556); West Point, NY
Dec 20, 2018*; 12:00 pm, ESPN+		Central Connecticut	W 58–46	8–5	John J. Lee Amphitheater (1,890); New Haven, CT
Dec 28, 2018*; 1:30 pm		vs. Saint Louis; FAU Holiday Classic semifinals	W 58–52	9–5	FAU Arena (530); Boca Raton, FL
Dec 28, 2018*; 2:30 pm		vs. North Carolina A&T; FAU Holiday Classic championship	W 59–49	10–5	FAU Arena (354); Boca Raton, FL
Ivy League regular season
Jan 18, 2019; 11:00 am, ESPN+/NESN		at Brown	L 71–86	10–6 (0–1)	Pizzitola Sports Center (1,141); Providence, RI
Jan 26, 2019; 2:00 pm, ESPN3		Brown	W 84–72	11–6 (1–1)	John J. Lee Amphitheater (702); New Haven, CT
Feb 1, 2019; 6:00 pm, ESPN3		Harvard	W 65–62	12–6 (2–1)	John J. Lee Amphitheater; New Haven, CT
Feb 2, 2019; 6:00 pm, ESPN+		Dartmouth	W 64–49	13–6 (3–1)	John J. Lee Amphitheater (790); New Haven, CT
Feb 8, 2019; 6:00 pm, ESPN+/NBCSPHI		at Princeton	W 96–86 ^{OT}	14–6 (4–1)	Jadwin Gymnasium (927); Princeton, NJ
Feb 9, 2019; 6:00 pm, ESPN+/NBCSPHI		at Penn	L 48–54	14–7 (4–2)	Palestra (903); Philadelphia, PA
Feb 15, 2019; 6:00 pm, ESPN+		Columbia	W 69–61	15–7 (5–2)	John J. Lee Amphitheater (541); New Haven, CT
Feb 16, 2019; 5:00 pm, ESPN+		Cornell	L 41–43	15–8 (5–3)	John J. Lee Amphitheater (639); New Haven, CT
Feb 22, 2019; 7:00 pm, ESPN+		at Dartmouth	L 54–56	15–9 (5–4)	Leede Arena (583); Hanover, NH
Feb 23, 2019; 5:00 pm, ESPN6		at Harvard	L 69–83	15–10 (5–5)	Lavietes Pavilion (933); Cambridge, MA
Mar 1, 2019; 6:00 pm, ESPN+		at Cornell	L 56–66	15–11 (5–6)	Newman Arena (465); Ithaca, NY
Mar 2, 2019; 5:00 pm, ESPN+/SNY		at Columbia	W 67–54	16–11 (6–6)	Levien Gymnasium (1,032); New York City, NY
Mar 8, 2019; 6:00 pm, ESPN+		Penn	L 56–65	16–12 (6–7)	John J. Lee Amphitheater (927); New Haven, CT
Mar 9, 2019; 5:00 pm, ESPN+		Princeton	L 68–80	16–13 (6–8)	John J. Lee Amphitheater (489); New Haven, CT
*Non-conference game. ^{#}Rankings from AP Poll. (#) Tournament seedings in parentheses. All times are in Eastern Time.

== See also ==
- 2018–19 Yale Bulldogs men's basketball team
