= 2018–19 Dartmouth Big Green women's basketball team =

Intercollegiate basketball season

2018–19 Dartmouth Big Green women's basketball
- Conference: Ivy League
- Record: 13–14 (6–8 Ivy)
- Head coach: Belle Koclanes (6th season)
- Assistant coaches: Taja Edwards; Kelcie Rombach; Lakin Roland
- Home arena: Leede Arena

2018–19 Ivy League women's basketball standings
	Conf.				Overall
Team	W		L	PCT	W		L	PCT
Penn	12	–	2	.857	24	–	6	.800
Princeton *†	12	–	2	.857	22	–	10	.688
Harvard	9	–	5	.643	17	–	12	.586
Yale	6	–	8	.429	16	–	13	.552
Dartmouth	6	–	8	.429	13	–	14	.481
Cornell	6	–	8	.429	12	–	14	.462
Columbia	4	–	10	.286	8	–	19	.296
Brown	1	–	13	.071	9	–	21	.300
† 2019 Ivy League Tournament winner * Tournament #1 seed As of March 23, 2019; Rankings from AP Poll

The 2018–19 Dartmouth Big Green women's basketball team represented Dartmouth College during the 2018–19 NCAA Division I women's basketball season. The Big Green, led by sixth-year head coach Belle Koclanes, played their home games at Leede Arena in Hanover, New Hampshire and were members of the Ivy League. They finished the season at 13–14, 6–8 in Ivy League play, to finish in a three-way tie for fourth place. Due to a tie-breaker loss to Cornell and Yale they failed to qualify for the Ivy League women's tournament.

== Roster ==
2018–19 Dartmouth Big Green women's basketball team
Players
Coaches

Pos.	#	Name	Height	Year	Previous school	Hometown
G	1	Cy Lippold	5 ft 2 in (1.57 m)	Sr	Blair Academy	East Stroudsburg, PA
G	2	Annie McKenna	5 ft 5 in (1.65 m)	Jr	Trinity	Elmwood Park, IL
G	3	Katie Douglas	5 ft 8 in (1.73 m)	Fr	Blair Academy	Mendham, NJ
G	5	Grace Phillips	6 ft 0 in (1.83 m)	Jr	Bishop Shanahan	Downingtown, PA
G	11	Asha Taylor	5 ft 11 in (1.8 m)	Fr	Miami Country Day	Fort Lauderdale, FL
F	13	Georgia Alexander	6 ft 2 in (1.88 m)	Fr	Oak Bay	Victoria, BC
F	15	Anna Luce	6 ft 2 in (1.88 m)	So	Mercer Island	Mercer Island, WA
G	20	Jimena Abejon	5 ft 9 in (1.75 m)	Fr	ISE Labor University	Gijón, Spain
G	21	Kealy Brown	5 ft 8 in (1.73 m)	Sr	Liberty	Henderson, NV
F	22	Veronica Kelly	6 ft 2 in (1.88 m)	Fr	Chatham	Chatham, NJ
F	25	Isalys Quiñones	6 ft 3 in (1.91 m)	Sr	Otay Ranch	Chula Vista, CA
F	31	Emily Dryden	6 ft 3 in (1.91 m)	Sr	Mullen	Lakewood, CO
G	35	Elle Louie	5 ft 10 in (1.78 m)	So	Miramonte	Orinda, CA
G/F	52	Paula Lenart	5 ft 11 in (1.8 m)	Jr	Northfield Mount Hermon	Covasna, Romania

Head coach

- Belle Koclanes (Richmond)

Assistant coach(es)

- Taja Edwards (Fresno State)
- Kelcie Rombach (St. Bonaventure)
- Lakin Roland (Dartmouth)

Legend

- (C) Team captain
- (S) Suspended
- (I) Ineligible
- (W) Walk-on
- Injured
- Current redshirt

Roster
Last update: October 8, 2024

== Schedule ==
Date time, TV	Rank^{#}	Opponent^{#}	Result	Record	Site (attendance) city, state
Non-conference regular season
November 9, 2018*; 7:00 p.m.		Loyola (MD)	W 54–41	1–0	Leede Arena (637); Hanover, NH
November 11, 2018*; 3:00 p.m.		at Vermont	W 66–42	2–0	Patrick Gym (509); Burlington, VT
November 24, 2018*; 5:30 p.m.		vs. Middle Tennessee; Lady Rebel Round-Up semifinals	L 58–70	2–1	Cox Pavilion (750); Paradise, NV
November 25, 2018*; 3:00 p.m.		vs. UC Santa Barbara; Lady Rebel Round-Up 3rd-place game	L 56–62	2–2	Cox Pavilion; Paradise, NV
November 28, 2018*; 10:00 p.m.		at Cal State Fullerton	L 62–67	2–3	Titan Gym (229); Fullerton, CA
December 1, 2018*; 5:00 p.m.		at San Diego	L 76–78	2–4	Jenny Craig Pavilion (351); San Diego, CA
December 5, 2018*; 12:00 p.m.		Boston University	W 64–44	3–4	Leede Arena (1,743); Hanover, NH
December 9, 2018*; 2:00 p.m.		Fairfield	W 59–46	4–4	Leede Arena (494); Hanover, NH
December 12, 2018*; 7:00 p.m., NESN		UMass Lowell	W 70–57	5–4	Leede Arena (285); Hanover, NH
December 18, 2018*; 7:00 p.m.		Buffalo	L 69–75	5–5	Leede Arena (383); Hanover, NH
December 21, 2018*; 11:00 a.m.		at New Hampshire; Rivalry	W 62–42	6–5	Lundholm Gym (1,557); Durham, NH
December 29, 2018*; 2:00 p.m.		at Boston College	L 68–99	6–6	Conte Forum (1,411); Chestnut Hill, MA
December 31, 2018*; 2:00 p.m.		Binghamton	W 63–39	7–6	Leede Arena (547); Hanover, NH
Ivy League regular season
January 19, 2019; 2:00 p.m.		at Harvard	L 46–56	7–7 (0–1)	Lavietes Pavilion (743); Cambridge, MA
January 26, 2019; 5:00 p.m., NESN+		Harvard	L 57–73	7–8 (0–2)	Leede Arena (1,000); Hanover, NH
February 1, 2019; 6:30 p.m.		at Brown	W 81–61	8–8 (1–2)	Pizzitola Sports Center (314); Providence, RI
February 2, 2019; 6:00 p.m.		at Yale	L 49–64	8–9 (1–3)	John J. Lee Amphitheater (790); New Haven, CT
February 8, 2019; 6:00 p.m.		at Cornell	W 63–56	9–9 (2–3)	Newman Arena (412); Ithaca, NY
February 9, 2019; 5:00 p.m.		Columbia	W 70–69	10–9 (3–3)	Levien Gymnasium (733); New York, NY
February 15, 2019; 7:00 p.m.		Penn	L 44–60	10–10 (3–4)	Leede Arena (733); Hanvoer, NH
February 16, 2019; 5:00 p.m., NESN+		Princeton	L 75–82	10–11 (3–5)	Leede Arena (773); Hanover, NH
February 22, 2019; 7:00 p.m.		Yale	W 56–54	11–11 (4–5)	Leede Arena (583); Hanover, NH
February 23, 2019; 5:00 p.m., NESN+		Brown	W 78–43	12–11 (5–5)	Leede Arena (637); Hanover, NH
March 1, 2019; 6:00 p.m.		at Princeton	L 47–64	12–12 (5–6)	Jadwin Gymnasium (721); Princeton, NJ
March 2, 2019; 6:00 p.m.		at Penn	L 52–56	12–13 (5–7)	Palestra (812); Philadelphia, PA
March 8, 2019; 7:00 p.m.		Columbia	W 60–48	13–13 (6–7)	Leede Arena (556); Hanover, NH
March 9, 2019; 5:00 p.m.		Cornell	L 47–57	13–14 (6–8)	Leede Arena (757); Hanover, NH
*Non-conference game. ^{#}Rankings from AP poll. (#) Tournament seedings in parentheses. All times are in Eastern.

== See also ==
- 2018–19 Dartmouth Big Green men's basketball team
