= 2018–19 Cornell Big Red women's basketball team =

Intercollegiate basketball season

2018–19 Cornell Big Red women's basketball
- Conference: Ivy League
- Record: 12–14 (6–8 Ivy)
- Head coach: Dayna Smith (17th season)
- Assistant coaches: Val Klopfer; David Elliott; Shelby Lyman
- Home arena: Newman Arena

2018–19 Ivy League women's basketball standings
	Conf.				Overall
Team	W		L	PCT	W		L	PCT
Penn	12	–	2	.857	24	–	6	.800
Princeton *†	12	–	2	.857	22	–	10	.688
Harvard	9	–	5	.643	17	–	12	.586
Yale	6	–	8	.429	16	–	13	.552
Dartmouth	6	–	8	.429	13	–	14	.481
Cornell	6	–	8	.429	12	–	14	.462
Columbia	4	–	10	.286	8	–	19	.296
Brown	1	–	13	.071	9	–	21	.300
† 2019 Ivy League Tournament winner * Tournament #1 seed As of March 23, 2019; Rankings from AP Poll

The 2018–19 Cornell Big Red women's basketball team represented Cornell University during the 2018–19 NCAA Division I women's basketball season. The Big Red, led by seventeenth year head coach Dayna Smith, played their home games at Newman Arena and were members of the Ivy League. They finished the season at 12–14, 6–8 to finish in a 3-way tie for fourth place. Due to a tie breaker with Yale and Dartmouth, Cornell earned the 4th seed in the Ivy League women's tournament. They lost to Princeton in the semifinals.

== Roster ==
2018–19 Cornell Big Red women's basketball team
Players
Coaches

Pos.	#	Name	Height	Year	Previous school	Hometown
G	3	Kate Sramac	5 ft 8 in (1.73 m)	So	Mount Lebanon	Pittsburgh, PA
G	4	Danielle Jorgenson	5 ft 9 in (1.75 m)	Jr	Orono	Orono, MN
G	5	Dylan Higgins	5 ft 11 in (1.8 m)	Jr	The Episcopal Academy	Bala Cynwyd, PA
G	10	Caitlyn Smith	5 ft 5 in (1.65 m)	Jr	Vero Beach; Palm Beach State College	Vero Beach, NJ
G	11	Samantha Will	5 ft 11 in (1.8 m)	Fr	Bishop Brady	Loudon, NH
G	12	Samantha Widmann	5 ft 11 in (1.8 m)	Jr	Notre Dame	Lawrenceville, NJ
F	14	Elodie Furey	6 ft 2 in (1.88 m)	So	The Episcopal Academy	Villanova, PA
F	15	Theresa Grace Mbanefo	6 ft 0 in (1.83 m)	Fr	Blaine	Otsego, MN
F	20	Halley Miklos	6 ft 1 in (1.85 m)	So	Liberty Common	Fort Collins, CO
G	23	Samantha Clement	5 ft 9 in (1.75 m)	Sr	Fairmont Preparatory Academy	Anaheim, CA
G	24	Laura Bagwell-Katalinich	6 ft 0 in (1.83 m)	Jr	Academy of the Holy Angels	Minneapolis, MN
F	25	Reena Olsen	6 ft 3 in (1.91 m)	So	Putnam Valley	Cortlandt Manor, NY
F	31	Stephanie Umeh	6 ft 1 in (1.85 m)	Jr	Notre Dame Academy	Los Angeles, CA
F	33	Jessica Willerson	6 ft 3 in (1.91 m)	Jr	Catherine McAuley	Falmouth, ME
F	43	Annika Hoff	6 ft 2 in (1.88 m)	Fr	Northfield	Northfield, MN

Head coach

- Dayna Smith (Rhode Island)

Assistant coach(es)

- Val Klopfer (Wake Forest)
- David Elliott (Arizona)
- Shelby Lyman (Cornell)

Legend

- (C) Team captain
- (S) Suspended
- (I) Ineligible
- (W) Walk-on
- Injured
- Current redshirt

Roster

== Schedule ==
Date time, TV	Rank^{#}	Opponent^{#}	Result	Record	Site (attendance) city, state
Non-conference regular season
Nov 9, 2018*; 5:30 pm, ESPN+		at Binghamton	L 61–72	0–1	Binghamton University Events Center (2,509); Vestal, NY
Nov 12, 2018*; 7:00 pm, ESPN+		Albany	W 48–34	1–1	Newman Arena (269); Ithaca, NY
Nov 15, 2018*; 6:00 pm		at Colgate; Postponed; inclement weather			Cotterell Court; Hamilton, NY
Nov 17, 2018*; 12:00 pm, ESPN+		UMass Lowell	W 63–54	2–1	Newman Arena (211); Ithaca, NY
Nov 23, 2018*; 4:00 pm		at No. 23 Minnesota	L 45–65	2–2	Williams Arena (4,339); Minneapolis, MN
Nov 25, 2018*; 2:00 pm		at Colorado State	L 53–56	2–3	Moby Arena (1,401); Fort Collins, CO
Nov 29, 2018*; 6:00 pm		at Lehigh	L 54–67	2–4	Stabler Arena (482); Bethlehem, PA
Dec 1, 2018*; 5:00 pm, ESPN+		at Stony Brook	L 61–63	2–5	Island Federal Credit Union Arena (3,123); Stony Brook, NY
Dec 15, 2018*; 7:00 pm, ESPN+		Delaware State	W 94–59	3–5	Newman Arena (179); Ithaca, NY
Dec 20, 2018*; 12:00 pm		at Lafayette	W 62–59	4–5	Kirby Sports Center (310); Easton, PA
Dec 29, 2018*; 2:00 pm, ESPN+		Hampton	W 79–53	5–5	Newman Arena (223); Ithaca, NY
Dec 31, 2018*; 2:30 pm, ESPN+		St. Bonaventure	W 58–44	6–5	Newman Arena (376); Ithaca, NY
Jan 7, 2019*; 7:00 pm, ESPN+		Vermont Tech; Cancelled			Newman Arena; Ithaca, NY
Ivy League regular season
Jan 19, 2019; 11:00 am, ESPN+		Columbia	W 60–51	7–5 (1–0)	Newman Arena (512); Ithaca, NY
Jan 26, 2019; 4:00 pm, ESPN+		at Columbia	L 57–65	7–6 (1–1)	Levien Gymnasium (1,002); New York, NY
Feb 1, 2019; 7:30 pm, ESPN+		Penn	L 46–59	7–7 (1–2)	Newman Arena (1,741); Ithaca, NY
Feb 2, 2019; 5:00 pm, ESPN+		Princeton	L 46–75	7–8 (1–2)	Newman Arena (750); Ithaca, NY
Feb 8, 2019; 6:00 pm, ESPN+		Dartmouth	L 56–63	7–9 (1–3)	Newman Arena (412); Ithaca, NY
Feb 9, 2019; 5:00 pm, ESPN+		Harvard	L 61–68	7–10 (1–4)	Newman Arena (424); Ithaca, NY
Feb 15, 2019; 7:00 pm, ESPN3		at Brown	W 65–53	8–10 (2–4)	Pizzitola Sports Center (355); Providence, RI
Feb 16, 2019; 5:00 pm, ESPN+		at Yale	W 43–41	9–10 (3–4)	John J. Lee Amphitheater (424); New Haven, CT
Feb 22, 2019; 5:30 pm, ESPN+		at Princeton	L 64–68	9–11 (3–6)	Jadwin Gymnasium (285); Princeton, NJ
Feb 23, 2019; 4:30 pm, ESPN+		at Penn	L 58–69	9–12 (3–7)	Palestra (4,298); Philadelphia, PA
Mar 1, 2019; 6:00 pm, ESPN+		Yale	W 66–56	10–12 (4–7)	Newman Arena (465); Ithaca, NY
Mar 2, 2019; 5:00 pm, ESPN+		Brown	W 66–48	11–12 (5–7)	Newman Arena; Ithaca, NY
Mar 8, 2019; 7:00 pm, ESPN+		at Harvard	L 38–80	11–13 (5–8)	Lavietes Pavilion (763); Cambridge, MA
Mar 9, 2019; 5:00 pm, ESPN+		at Dartmouth	W 57–47	12–13 (6–8)	Leede Arena (757); Hanover, NH
Ivy League Tournament
Mar 16, 2019; 6:00 pm, ESPN3	(4)	vs. (1) Princeton; Semifinals	L 47–68	12–14	John J. Lee Amphitheater; New Haven, CT
*Non-conference game. ^{#}Rankings from AP Poll. (#) Tournament seedings in parentheses. All times are in Eastern Time.

== See also ==
- 2018–19 Cornell Big Red men's basketball team
