= Vancouver Showcase =

Canadian basketball tournament

- Sport: Men's & women's college basketball
- Founded: 2018
- Folded: 2019
- No. of teams: 4 (men's), 8 (women's)
- Country: Canada
- Venues: Vancouver Convention Centre, Vancouver, B.C.
- Last champions: Minnesota (men's); Notre Dame (women's)

The Vancouver Showcase was a men's and women's college basketball tournament that was first played in November 18 through 20, 2018 at the Vancouver Convention Centre in Vancouver, British Columbia, Canada. Four men's and eight women's teams participated in the tournament. The event moved to Victoria, British ColumbiaV for 2019 after the loss of local support in Vancouver.

== Brackets ==
* – Denotes overtime period

=== 2018 ===
==== Men's ====
November 18; ESPN3
Washington	82
Santa Clara	68

November 18; ESPN2/TSN2
Texas A&M	64
Minnesota	69

November 20; BTN
Santa Clara	66
Minnesota	80

November 20; ESPN2/TSN2
Washington	71
Texas A&M	67

November 21; BTN
Minnesota	68
Washington	66

==== Women's ====
5th Place Game; November 24
Gonzaga	76
Western Kentucky	55
7th Place Game
Rutgers	68
East Tennessee State	44

Consolation 2nd Round; November 23
Gonzaga	57
Rutgers	40
East Tennessee State	68
Western Kentucky	82

First Round; November 22
1	Notre Dame	81
Gonzaga	65
Rutgers	59
Drake	69
13	South Carolina	101
East Tennessee State	55
9	Oregon State	74
Western Kentucky	60

Semifinals; November 23
1	Notre Dame	82
Drake	64
13	South Carolina	68
9	Oregon State	70

Championship; November 24
1	Notre Dame	91
9	Oregon State	81
3rd Place Game
Drake	90
13	South Carolina	85*
