= 2019 Ivy League women's basketball tournament =

- Classification: Division I
- Season: 2018–19
- Teams: 4
- Site: Payne Whitney Gymnasium; New Haven, Connecticut
- Champions: Princeton (2nd title)
- Winning coach: Courtney Banghart (2nd title)
- MVP: Bella Alarie (Princeton)
- Television: ESPNU, ESPN3

2018–19 Ivy League women's basketball standings
	Conf.				Overall
Team	W		L	PCT	W		L	PCT
Penn	12	–	2	.857	24	–	6	.800
Princeton *†	12	–	2	.857	22	–	10	.688
Harvard	9	–	5	.643	17	–	12	.586
Yale	6	–	8	.429	16	–	13	.552
Dartmouth	6	–	8	.429	13	–	14	.481
Cornell	6	–	8	.429	12	–	14	.462
Columbia	4	–	10	.286	8	–	19	.296
Brown	1	–	13	.071	9	–	21	.300
† 2019 Ivy League Tournament winner * Tournament #1 seed As of March 23, 2019; Rankings from AP Poll

The 2019 Ivy League women's basketball tournament was a women's college conference tournament held March 16 and 17, 2019, at the Payne Whitney Gymnasium on the campus of Yale University in New Haven, Connecticut. Princeton defeated Penn to earn the Ivy League's automatic bid to the 2019 NCAA tournament.

== Seeds ==
Only the top four teams in the 2018–19 Ivy League regular-season standings will participate in the tournament and be seeded according to their records in conference play, resulting in a Shaughnessy playoff.

Seed	School	Overall	Conference	Tiebreaker
1	Princeton	12–2	20–9	2–0 vs. Harvard
2	Penn	12–2	22–5	1–1 vs. Harvard
3	Harvard	9–5	16–11	
4	Cornell	6–8	12–13	3–1 vs. Yale, Dartmouth

== Schedule ==
Session	Game	Time*	Matchup^{#}	Television	Attendance
Semifinals – Saturday, March 16
1	1	6:00 PM	#1 Princeton vs. #4 Cornell	ESPN3	
1	2	8:30 PM	#2 Penn vs. #3 Harvard	ESPN3	
Championship – Sunday, March 17
2	3	4:00 PM	#1 Princeton vs. #2 Penn	ESPNU	

*Game times in Eastern Time. #Rankings denote tournament seeding.

== Bracket ==
Semifinals; Saturday, March 16; Payne Whitney Gymnasium
1	Princeton	68
4	Cornell	47
2	Penn	91
3	Harvard	62

Final; Sunday, March 17; Payne Whitney Gymnasium
1	Princeton	65
2	Penn	54
