= 2018–19 Columbia Lions women's basketball team =

Intercollegiate basketball season

2018–19 Columbia Lions women's basketball
- Conference: Ivy League
- Record: 8–19 (4–10 Ivy)
- Head coach: Megan Griffith (3rd season)
- Assistant coaches: Tyler Cordell; Greg Rosnick; Kerry Connolly
- Home arena: Levien Gymnasium

2018–19 Ivy League women's basketball standings
	Conf.				Overall
Team	W		L	PCT	W		L	PCT
Penn	12	–	2	.857	24	–	6	.800
Princeton *†	12	–	2	.857	22	–	10	.688
Harvard	9	–	5	.643	17	–	12	.586
Yale	6	–	8	.429	16	–	13	.552
Dartmouth	6	–	8	.429	13	–	14	.481
Cornell	6	–	8	.429	12	–	14	.462
Columbia	4	–	10	.286	8	–	19	.296
Brown	1	–	13	.071	9	–	21	.300
† 2019 Ivy League Tournament winner * Tournament #1 seed As of March 23, 2019; Rankings from AP Poll

The 2018–19 Columbia Lions women's basketball team represented Columbia University during the 2018–19 NCAA Division I women's basketball season. The Lions, led by third-year head coach Megan Griffith, played their home games at Levien Gymnasium and were members of the Ivy League. They finished the season 8–19, 4–10 in Ivy League play to finish in seventh place. They failed to qualify for the Ivy women's tournament.

== Previous season ==
They finished the season 8–21, 2–12 in Ivy League play to finish in last place. They failed to qualify for the Ivy women's tournament.

== Roster ==
2018–19 Columbia Lions women's basketball team
Players
Coaches

Pos.	#	Name	Height	Year	Previous school	Hometown
G/F	0	Imani Whittington	5 ft 11 in (1.8 m)	So	Barking Abbey School	London, England
G	1	Janiya Clemmons	5 ft 9 in (1.75 m)	Jr	Bishop Denis J. O'Connell	Accokeek, MD
G	2	Madison Hardy	5 ft 9 in (1.75 m)	Fr	Our Lady of Good Counsel	Gaithersburg, MD
G	3	Riley Casey	5 ft 8 in (1.73 m)	So	Franklin Road Academy	Brentwood, TN
G	10	Andrea McCormick	5 ft 8 in (1.73 m)	So	Villa Maria Academy	Erie, PA
G/F	11	Sydney Brown	6 ft 0 in (1.83 m)	Fr	Blair Academy	Rexford, NY
F	12	Hannah Pratt	6 ft 1 in (1.85 m)	Fr	Boca Raton	Boca Raton, FL
G	13	Mikayla Markham	5 ft 7 in (1.7 m)	Fr	St. Rose	Manasquan, NJ
G/F	20	Sienna Durr	6 ft 0 in (1.83 m)	Fr	Grinnell	Grinnell, IA
G/F	23	Lilian Kennedy	5 ft 11 in (1.8 m)	Fr	Mountain View	Burford, GA
F	24	Kallin Spiller	6 ft 3 in (1.91 m)	So	Lakeside; Seattle	Seattle, WA
G	25	Stephanie Flynn	5 ft 10 in (1.78 m)	Jr	Hanover	Hanover, MA
F/C	32	Madison Pack	6 ft 3 in (1.91 m)	So	Sarasota	Sarasota, FL
G	33	Abby Lee	5 ft 11 in (1.8 m)	Sr	West Monroe	West Monroe, LA
F		Sarah Elston	6 ft 3 in (1.91 m)	Jr	Loyola Academy	Bannockburn, IL
F		Josie Little	6 ft 2 in (1.88 m)	Sr	St. Ignatius College Prep	San Francisco, CA

Head coach

- Megan Griffith (Columbia)

Assistant coach(es)

- Greg Rosnick (Haverford)
- Tyler Cordell (Ohio Wesleyan)
- Kerry Connolly (Molloy)

Legend

- (C) Team captain
- (S) Suspended
- (I) Ineligible
- (W) Walk-on
- Injured
- Current redshirt

Roster

2018-19 Ivy Awards and Recognition
- Sienna Durr – Rookie of the Year; Second Team All-Ivy
- Janiya Clemmons – Honorable Mention

== Schedule ==
Date time, TV	Rank^{#}	Opponent^{#}	Result	Record	Site (attendance) city, state
Non-conference regular season
November 9, 2018*; 5:00 pm		at Hofstra	W 65–63	1–0	Hofstra Arena (4,645); Hempstead, NY
November 12, 2018*; 7:00 pm, ESPN+		Army	W 70–49	2–0	Levien Gymnasium (378); New York, NY
November 16, 2018*; 8:00 pm, ESPN+		at Milwaukee	L 65–78	2–1	Klotsche Center (574); Milwaukee, WI
November 18, 2018*; 2:00 pm		at Illinois	L 69–76	2–2	State Farm Center (1,439); Champaign, IL
November 21, 2018*; 2:00 pm, ESPN+		Houston	L 72–83	2–3	Levien Gymnasium (1,439); New York, NY
November 25, 2018*; 2:00 pm		at Colgate	L 71–83	2–4	Cotterell Court (214); Hamilton, NY
November 29, 2018*; 7:00 pm, ESPN+		at Saint Joseph's	L 61–68 ^{OT}	2–5	Hagan Arena (214); Philadelphia, PA
December 2, 2018*; 2:00 pm, ACCNE		at Boston College	L 60–74	2–6	Conte Forum (782); Chestnut Hill, MA
December 5, 2018*; 11:00 am, ESPN+		Cal State Fullerton	L 58–61	2–7	Levien Gymnasium (2,602); New York, NY
December 11, 2018*; 6:00 pm, ESPN+		at Fordham	L 49–68	2–8	Rose Hill Gymnasium; Bronx, NY
December 29, 2018*; 2:00 pm, SNY/ESPN+		Albany	L 58–62	2–9	Levien Gymnasium (552); New York, NY
January 2, 2019*; 7:00 pm, ESPN+		Hampton	W 88–63	3–9	Levien Gymnasium (356); New York, NY
January 6, 2019*; 2:00 pm, ESPN+		at Mercer	W 72–68	4–9	Hawkins Arena (565); Macon, GA
Ivy League regular season
January 19, 2019; 11:00 am, ESPN+		at Cornell	L 51–60	4–10 (0–1)	Newman Arena (512); Ithaca, NY
January 26, 2019; 4:00 pm, SNY/ESPN+		Cornell	W 65–57	5–10 (1–1)	Levien Gymnasium (1,002); New York, NY
February 1, 2019; 4:00 pm, ESPN+		Princeton	L 64–79	5–11 (1–2)	Levien Gymnasium (511); New York, NY
February 2, 2019; 5:30 pm, ESPN+		Penn	L 60–72	5–12 (1–3)	Levien Gymnasium (713); New York, NY
February 8, 2019; 7:00 pm, SNY/ESPN+		Harvard	W 75–65	6–12 (2–3)	Levien Gymnasium (527); New York, NY
February 9, 2019; 5:00 pm, SNY/ESPN3		Dartmouth	L 69–70	6–13 (2–4)	Levien Gymnasium (733); New York, NY
February 15, 2019; 6:00 pm, ESPN+		at Yale	L 61–69	6–14 (2–5)	John J. Lee Amphitheater (541); New Haven, CT
February 16, 2019; 7:00 pm, ESPN+		at Brown	W 83–81	7–14 (3–5)	Pizzitola Sports Center (506); Providence, RI
February 22, 2019; 5:30 pm, ESPN+		at Penn	L 56–79	7–15 (3–6)	The Palestra (2,906); Philadelphia, PA
February 23, 2019; 5:30 pm, ESPN3		at Princeton	L 59–65	7–16 (3–7)	Jadwin Gymnasium (925); Princeton, NJ
March 1, 2019; 7:00 pm, ESPN+		Princeton	W 93–62	8–16 (4–7)	Levien Gymnasium (667); New York, NY
March 2, 2019; 5:00 pm, SNY/ESPN+		Yale	L 54–67	8–17 (4–8)	Levien Gymnasium (1,032); New York, NY
March 8, 2019; 7:00 pm, ESPN+		at Dartmouth	L 48–60	8–18 (4–9)	Leede Arena (556); Hanover, NH
March 9, 2019; 5:00 pm, ESPN+		at Harvard	L 56–69	8–19 (4–10)	Lavietes Pavilion (838); Cambridge, MA
*Non-conference game. ^{#}Rankings from AP Poll. (#) Tournament seedings in parentheses. All times are in Eastern Time.

== See also ==
- 2018–19 Columbia Lions men's basketball team
