= 2018–19 Harvard Crimson women's basketball team =

Intercollegiate basketball season

2018–19 Harvard Crimson women's basketball

Warner Center Marriott Thanksgiving Basketball Classic Champions

WNIT, Second Round
- Conference: Ivy League
- Record: 17–13 (9–5 Ivy)
- Head coach: Kathy Delaney-Smith (37th season)
- Assistant coaches: Mike Roux; Jasmine Sborov; Megan Straumann
- Home arena: Lavietes Pavilion

2018–19 Ivy League women's basketball standings
	Conf.				Overall
Team	W		L	PCT	W		L	PCT
Penn	12	–	2	.857	24	–	6	.800
Princeton *†	12	–	2	.857	22	–	10	.688
Harvard	9	–	5	.643	17	–	12	.586
Yale	6	–	8	.429	16	–	13	.552
Dartmouth	6	–	8	.429	13	–	14	.481
Cornell	6	–	8	.429	12	–	14	.462
Columbia	4	–	10	.286	8	–	19	.296
Brown	1	–	13	.071	9	–	21	.300
† 2019 Ivy League Tournament winner * Tournament #1 seed As of March 23, 2019; Rankings from AP Poll

The 2018–19 Harvard Crimson women's basketball team represented Harvard University during the 2018–19 NCAA Division I women's basketball season. The Crimson, led by thirty-seventh year head coach Kathy Delaney-Smith, played their home games at the Lavietes Pavilion and were members of the Ivy League.

== Roster ==
2018–19 Harvard Crimson women's basketball team
Players
Coaches

Pos.	#	Name	Height	Year	Previous school	Hometown
G	0	Nani Redford	5 ft 5 in (1.65 m)	Sr	Long Island Lutheran	Manhasset, NY
G	1	Kelsey Bogdan	5 ft 11 in (1.8 m)	Sr	Montini Catholic	Clarendon Hills, IL
G	2	Tess Sussman	5 ft 11 in (1.8 m)	Fr	Rivers School	Needham, MA
G	3	Katie Benzan	5 ft 6 in (1.68 m)	Jr	Noble and Greenough School	Wellesley, MA
G	5	Matilda Salen	5 ft 9 in (1.75 m)	So	Solna Gymnasium	Bromma, Sweden
G	11	Maggie McCarthy	5 ft 10 in (1.78 m)	Fr	Medfield	Medfield, MA
G/F	12	Rachel Levy	6 ft 2 in (1.88 m)	So	Boca Raton Community	Boca Raton, FL
F	13	Jeannie Boehm	6 ft 3 in (1.91 m)	Jr	New Trier	Winnetka, IL
G	14	Mackenzie Barta	5 ft 9 in (1.75 m)	Jr	Maple Grove Senior	Maple Grove, MN
G	20	Madeline Raster (C)	5 ft 9 in (1.75 m)	Sr	Saint Joseph	South Bend, IN
F	21	Grace Tworek	6 ft 0 in (1.83 m)	So	William Fremd	Inverness, IL
F	22	Maddie Stuhlreyer	6 ft 5 in (1.96 m)	So	Ursuline Academy	Cincinnati, OH
F	24	Jadyn Bush	5 ft 11 in (1.8 m)	So	Bishop Blanchet	Federal Way, WA
G	25	Sydney Skinner (C)	5 ft 7 in (1.7 m)	Sr	Plano West	Plano, TX

Head coach

- Kathy Delaney-Smith (Bridgewater State)

Assistant coach(es)

- Mike Roux (Assumption (MA))
- Jasmine Sborov (Colorado)
- Megan Straumann (Rhode Island)

Legend

- (C) Team captain
- (S) Suspended
- (I) Ineligible
- (W) Walk-on
- Injured
- Current redshirt

Roster

== Schedule ==
Date time, TV	Rank^{#}	Opponent^{#}	Result	Record	Site (attendance) city, state
Non-conference regular season
Nov 9, 2018*; 4:00 pm, ACCNE		at No. 1 Notre Dame	L 58–103	0–1	Edmund P. Joyce Center (9,149); South Bend, IN
Nov 11, 2018*; 2:00 pm		at Purdue	L 65–66	0–2	Mackey Arena (5,884); West Lafayette, IN
Nov 14, 2018*; 7:00 pm, ESPN+/NESN		La Salle	W 88–43	1–2	Lavietes Pavilion (667); Boston, MA
Nov 16, 2018*; 7:00 pm		at Siena	W 73–54	2–2	Alumni Recreation Center (628); Loudonville, NY
Nov 21, 2018*; 12:00 pm, ESPN+		at Hartford	L 60–73	2–3	Chase Arena at Reich Family Pavilion (478); West Hartford, CT
Nov 23, 2018*; 8:00 pm		vs. Jacksonville State; Warner Center Marriott Thanksgiving Basketball Classic semifinals	W 69–62	3–3	Matadome (150); Northridge, CA
Nov 24, 2018*; 9:00 pm		at Cal State Northridge; Warner Center Marriott Thanksgiving Basketball Classic championship	W 75–55	4–3	Matadome (344); Northridge, CA
Nov 30, 2018*; 7:00 pm, ESPN+		Quinnipiac	L 67–72 ^{2OT}	4–4	Lavietes Pavilion (764); Boston, MA
Dec 4, 2018*; 7:00 pm, ESPN+		Maine	L 60–67	4–5	Lavietes Pavilion (426); Boston, MA
Dec 8, 2018*; 2:00 pm, ESPN+		Rutgers	L 49–60	4–6	Lavietes Pavilion (783); Boston, MA
Dec 21, 2018*; 4:00 pm, ESPN+/NESN		Boston University	W 67–47	5–6	Lavietes Pavilion (556); Boston, MA
Dec 28, 2018*; 2:00 pm		at Rutgers	W 80–47	6–6	Ryan Center (545); Kingston, RI
Dec 30, 2018*; 5:00 pm		at No. 14 California	W 85–79	7–6	Haas Pavilion (2,319); Berkeley, CA
Ivy League regular season
Jan 19, 2019; 2:00 pm, ESPN+		Dartmouth	W 56–46	8–6 (1–0)	Lavietes Pavilion (743); Boston, MA
Jan 26, 2019; 5:00 pm, ESPN+		at Dartmouth	W 73–57	9–6 (2–0)	Leede Arena (1,000); Hanover, NH
Feb 1, 2019; 6:00 pm, ESPN3		at Yale	L 62–65	9–7 (2–1)	John J. Lee Amphitheater; New Haven, CT
Feb 2, 2019; 4:30 pm, ESPN+/NESN		at Brown	W 100–83	10–7 (3–1)	Pizzitola Sports Center (623); Providence, RI
Feb 8, 2019; 7:00 pm, ESPN+		at Columbia	L 65–75	10–8 (3–2)	Levien Gymnasium (527); New York City, NY
Feb 9, 2019; 5:00 pm, ESPN+		at Cornell	W 68–61	11–8 (4–2)	Newman Arena (424); Ithaca, NY
Feb 15, 2019; 7:00 pm, ESPN+/NESN		Princeton	L 71–75	11–9 (4–3)	Lavietes Pavilion (736); Boston, MA
Feb 16, 2019; 5:00 pm, ESPN+		Penn	W 80–72 ^{2OT}	12–9 (5–3)	Lavietes Pavilion (1,636); Boston, MA
Feb 22, 2019; 7:00 pm, ESPN+		Brown	W 98–55	13–9 (6–3)	Lavietes Pavilion (708); Boston, MA
Feb 23, 2019; 5:00 pm, ESPN+		Yale	W 83–69	14–9 (7–3)	Lavietes Pavilion (933); Boston, MA
Mar 1, 2019; 7:00 pm, ESPN+		at Penn	L 75–80 ^{OT}	14–10 (7–4)	Palestra (568); Philadelphia, PA
Mar 2, 2019; 5:00 pm, ESPN+		at Princeton	L 58–61	14–11 (7–5)	Jadwin Gymnasium (1,236); Princeton, NJ
Mar 8, 2019; 7:00 pm, ESPN+		Cornell	W 80–38	15–11 (8–5)	Lavietes Pavilion (763); Boston, MA
Mar 9, 2019; 5:00 pm, ESPN+		Columbia	W 69–56	16–11 (9–5)	Lavietes Pavilion (838); Boston, MA
Ivy League Tournament
Mar 16, 2019; 8:30 pm, ESPN3	(3)	vs. (2) Penn; Semifinals	L 62–91	16–12	John J. Lee Amphitheater; New Haven, CT
WNIT
Mar 22, 2019*; 8:30 pm, ESPN+		Drexel; First Round	W 69–56	17–12	Lavietes Pavilion; Boston, MA
Mar 24, 2019*; 3:00 pm		Georgetown; Second Round	L 65–70	17–13	Lavietes Pavilion (322); Boston, MA
*Non-conference game. ^{#}Rankings from AP Poll. (#) Tournament seedings in parentheses. All times are in Eastern Time.

== See also ==
- 2018–19 Harvard Crimson men's basketball team
