= 2018–19 Princeton Tigers women's basketball team =

Intercollegiate basketball season

2018–19 Princeton Tigers women's basketball

Ivy League regular season co-champions and tournament champions

NCAA tournament, first round
- Conference: Ivy League
- Record: 22–10 (12–2 Ivy)
- Head coach: Courtney Banghart (12th season)
- Assistant coaches: Carrie Moore (3rd season); Addie Micir (1st season); Cinnamon Lister (1st season)
- Home arena: Jadwin Gymnasium

2018–19 Ivy League women's basketball standings
	Conf.				Overall
Team	W		L	PCT	W		L	PCT
Penn	12	–	2	.857	24	–	6	.800
Princeton *†	12	–	2	.857	22	–	10	.688
Harvard	9	–	5	.643	17	–	12	.586
Yale	6	–	8	.429	16	–	13	.552
Dartmouth	6	–	8	.429	13	–	14	.481
Cornell	6	–	8	.429	12	–	14	.462
Columbia	4	–	10	.286	8	–	19	.296
Brown	1	–	13	.071	9	–	21	.300
† 2019 Ivy League Tournament winner * Tournament #1 seed As of March 23, 2019; Rankings from AP Poll

The 2018–19 Princeton Tigers women's basketball team represented Princeton University during the 2018–19 NCAA Division I women's basketball season. The Tigers, led by twelfth-year head coach Courtney Banghart, played their home games at Jadwin Gymnasium as members of the Ivy League.

The Tigers finished the season with a 22–10 overall record and 12–2 in the Ivy League. They tied Penn for first place in the conference's regular season, and met them in the Ivy League Tournament championship to determine which Ivy League team will get a first-round bid for the NCAA tournament. The Tigers won, but lost in the first round to 17th-ranked Kentucky.

== Previous season ==
The Tigers finished the 2017–18 season with a 24–6 overall record and 12–2 in the Ivy League. They finished first in the conference to play Penn in a playoff to determine which Ivy League team will get a first-round bid for the NCAA tournament. The Tigers won, but their postseason ended with a loss in the first round to 16th-ranked Maryland.

== Roster ==
2018–19 Princeton Tigers women's basketball team
Players
Coaches

Pos.	#	Name	Height	Year	Hometown
G/F	31	Bella Alarie	6 ft 4 in (1.93 m)	Jr	Bethesda, MD
F	22	Taylor Baur	6 ft 2 in (1.88 m)	Jr	St. Louis, MO
F	3	Sydney Boyer	6 ft 1 in (1.85 m)	So	Woodstock, GA
G	12	Maggie Connolly	5 ft 8 in (1.73 m)	Fr	Wilmington, DE
G	24	Julia Cunningham	5 ft 11 in (1.8 m)	Fr	Watchung, NJ
F	21	Kira Emsbo	6 ft 5 in (1.96 m)	Fr	Lakewood, CO
G	4	McKenna Haire	5 ft 10 in (1.78 m)	So	Charlotte, NC
G	32	Qalea Ismail	6 ft 1 in (1.85 m)	Sr	Bel Air, MD
G/F	13	Sydney Jordan	6 ft 0 in (1.83 m)	Sr	Manassas, VA
G	2	Carlie Littlefield	5 ft 9 in (1.75 m)	So	Waukee, IA
G	25	Gabrielle Rush	5 ft 10 in (1.78 m)	Sr	Hinsdale, IL
G	10	Grace Stone	5 ft 11 in (1.8 m)	Fr	Glen Cove, NY
G/F	33	Lexi Weger	6 ft 3 in (1.91 m)	Fr	Fairfax, VA
G/F	11	Neenah Young	5 ft 10 in (1.78 m)	Fr	Tracy, CA

Head coach

- Courtney Banghart (Dartmouth)

Assistant coach(es)

- Carrie Moore (Western Michigan)
- Addie Micir (Princeton)
- Cinnamon Lister (Cal State Northridge)

Legend

- (C) Team captain
- (S) Suspended
- (I) Ineligible
- (W) Walk-on
- Injured
- Current redshirt

Roster
Last update: September 25, 2018

2018-19 Ivy Awards and Recognition
- Bella Alarie – Player of the Year; First Team All-Ivy
- Carlie Littlefield – First Team All-Ivy

== Schedule ==
Date time, TV	Rank^{#}	Opponent^{#}	Result	Record	Site (attendance) city, state
Regular season
Nov 6, 2018*; 7:00 pm		at Rider	W 89–65	1–0	Alumni Gymnasium (811); Lawrenceville, NJ
Nov 11, 2018*; 2:00 pm		at George Washington	L 49–64	1–1	Charles E. Smith Athletic Center (1,528); Washington, DC
Nov 14, 2018*; 6:00 pm, ESPN+		Seton Hall	L 66–70	1–2	Jadwin Gymnasium (715); Princeton, NJ
Nov 18, 2018*; 2:00 pm, BTN		at Penn State	L 71–79 ^{OT}	1–3	Bryce Jordan Center (2,026); University Park, PA
Nov 22, 2018*; 11:00 am		vs. No. 15 DePaul; Cancún Challenge Mayan Division	L 67–82	1–4	Hard Rock Hotel Riviera Maya Convention Center; Puerto Aventuras, Mexico
Nov 23, 2018*; 1:30 pm		vs. No. 22 Syracuse; Cancún Challenge Mayan Division	L 61–92	1–5	Hard Rock Hotel Riviera Maya Convention Center; Puerto Aventuras, Mexico
Nov 24, 2018*; 11:00 am		vs. Kansas State; Cancún Challenge Mayan Division	L 61–80	1–6	Hard Rock Hotel Riviera Maya Convention Center (300); Puerto Aventuras, Mexico
Nov 28, 2018*; 7:00 pm		at Villanova	L 46–67	1–7	Finneran Pavilion (601); Villanova, PA
Dec 2, 2018*; 2:00 pm		Davidson	W 65–57	2–7	Jadwin Gymnasium (735); Princeton, NJ
Dec 8, 2018*; 7:00 pm, NBCSPHI+		Quinnipiac	W 54–42	3–7	Jadwin Gymnasium (615); Princeton, NJ
Dec 11, 2018*; 7:00 pm, ESPN+		at Monmouth	W 79–47	4–7	OceanFirst Bank Center (543); West Long Branch, NJ
Dec 15, 2018*; 5:00 pm		Marist	W 60–57	5–7	Jadwin Gymnasium (680); Princeton, NJ
Dec 19, 2018*; 2:00 pm		at St. Francis Brooklyn	W 83–64	6–7	Generoso Pope Athletic Complex (244); Brooklyn, NY
Dec 21, 2018*; 7:00 pm, ESPN+		at Hartford	W 75–38	7–7	Chase Arena at Reich Family Pavilion (546); West Hartford, CT
Dec 29, 2018*; 1:00 pm		at New Hampshire	W 90–42	8–7	Lundholm Gym (360); Durham, NH
Ivy League regular season
Jan 5, 2019; 2:00 pm, NBCSPHI+		Penn	L 60–66	8–8 (0–1)	Jadwin Gymnasium (1,104); Princeton, NJ
Feb 1, 2019; 4:00 pm, NBCSPHI		at Columbia	W 79–64	9–8 (1–1)	Levien Gymnasium (511); New York City, NY
Feb 2, 2019; 5:00 pm		at Cornell	W 75–46	10–8 (2–1)	Newman Arena (750); Ithaca, NY
Feb 8, 2019; 6:00 pm, NBCSPHI		Yale	L 86–96 ^{OT}	10–9 (2–2)	Jadwin Gymnasium (927); Princeton, NJ
Feb 9, 2019; 5:00 pm		Brown	W 93–74	11–9 (3–2)	Jadwin Gymnasium (1,180); Princeton, NJ
Feb 15, 2019; 7:00 pm		at Harvard	W 75–71	12–9 (4–2)	Lavietes Pavilion (736); Cambridge, MA
Feb 16, 2019; 5:00 pm		at Dartmouth	W 82–75	13–9 (5–2)	Leede Arena (773); Hanover, NH
Feb 22, 2019; 5:30 pm		Cornell	W 68–64	14–9 (6–2)	Jadwin Gymnasium (285); Princeton, NJ
Feb 23, 2019; 5:30 pm		Columbia	W 65–59	15–9 (7–2)	Jadwin Gymnasium (925); Princeton, NJ
Feb 26, 2019; 7:00 pm		at Penn	W 68–53	16–9 (8–2)	Palestra (683); Philadelphia, PA
Mar 1, 2019; 6:00 pm		Dartmouth	W 64–47	17–9 (9–2)	Jadwin Gymnasium (721); Princeton, NJ
Mar 2, 2019; 5:00 pm		Harvard	W 61–58	18–9 (10–2)	Jadwin Gymnasium (1,236); Princeton, NJ
Mar 8, 2019; 7:00 pm		at Brown	W 88–69	19–9 (11–2)	Pizzitola Sports Center (541); Providence, RI
Mar 9, 2019; 5:00 pm		at Yale	W 80–68	20–9 (12–2)	John J. Lee Amphitheater (489); New Haven, CT
Ivy League Tournament
Mar 16, 2019; 6:00 pm, ESPN3	(1)	vs. (4) Cornell; Semifinals	W 68–47	21–9	John J. Lee Amphitheater; New Haven, CT
Mar 17, 2019; 4:00 pm, ESPNU	(1)	vs. (2) Penn; Championship Game	W 65–54	22–9	John J. Lee Amphitheater; New Haven, CT
NCAA Women's Tournament
Mar 23, 2019*; 11:00 am, ESPN2	(11 G)	vs. (6 G) No. 17 Kentucky; First Round	L 77–82	22–10	Reynolds Coliseum; Raleigh, NC
*Non-conference game. ^{#}Rankings from AP Poll. (#) Tournament seedings in parentheses. G=Greensboro Region. All times are in Eastern Time.
