= Chinese American International School =

Location
- 3250 19th Avenue; San Francisco; US

Information
- Type: Private
- Established: 1981
- Head of School: Jeff Bissell (Chinese name: 毕杰夫 Bì Jiéfū)
- Website: www.cais.org

Chinese American International School (CAIS) is an independent preschool through Grade 8 co-educational Chinese-English dual language immersion school located in San Francisco, California. Preschool is full immersion, Kindergarten through Grade 5 are alternating days in conducted in Chinese. The school was the first in the United States to have Mandarin immersion education.

CAIS also offers international travel programs for current students, faculty, and staff. The school organizes trips to Taipei and Guilin in the fifth, seventh, and eighth grades.

== History ==
In 1981, San Francisco Supervisor Carol Ruth Silver searched unsuccessfully for a Mandarin-English school where she could enroll her adopted Taiwanese son. She decided to start her own with the help of district attorney Mimi Luk, Justice Harry Low, Bernard Ivaldi (then Head of the French American International School), Maurice Tseng, Yvon d'Argence (then curator of the Asian Art Museum, Joe Chen, Mike Chiu, Donna Furth, Diana Chan, Francisco Hsieh, George Cheng, and Alice Carnes.

In September 1981, the school, then known as the Chinese American Bilingual School, began as a Mandarin-English school. It had an enrollment of four kindergarten students and was operating in the basement of the French American International School. Shirley Lee, a faculty member of the Chinese department at San Francisco State University joined as founding teacher and principal, and remained head of school until her retirement in 2000.

In 1989, the school moved to the Presidio of San Francisco. In 1992, a middle school was added (which moved to a new campus in 2015). In 1997 CAIS moved into its campus at 150 Oak St, the former Caltrans headquarters, in partnership with the French American International School.

CAIS has received national recognition for its program. In 1987 the US Department of Education designated CAIS the "national prototype for Chinese language education in elementary schools." In 2004, CAIS was awarded the Goldman Sachs Prize for Excellence in International Education.

In 2021, CAIS secured the former property of Mercy High School for $40 million, which has now become the new location of the campus.

== Accreditations ==
- California Association of Independent Schools (CAIS)
- Western Association of Schools and Colleges (WASC)
