= 2018–19 Notre Dame Fighting Irish women's basketball team =

Intercollegiate basketball season

2018–19 Notre Dame Fighting Irish women's basketball

Vancouver Showcase champions ACC regular season co-champions ACC tournament champions

NCAA tournament, Runner-Up
- Conference: Atlantic Coast Conference

Ranking
- Coaches: No. 2
- AP: No. 3
- Record: 35–4 (14–2 ACC)
- Head coach: Muffet McGraw (32nd season)
- Associate head coach: Carol Owens (19th season)
- Assistant coaches: Niele Ivey (12th season); Beth Cunningham (7th season)
- Home arena: Edmund P. Joyce Center

2018–19 ACC women's basketball standings
	Conf.				Overall
Team	W		L	PCT	W		L	PCT
No. 3 Notre Dame†	14	–	2	.875	35	–	4	.897
No. 5 Louisville	14	–	2	.875	32	–	4	.889
No. 10 NC State	12	–	4	.750	28	–	6	.824
No. 19 Miami (FL)	12	–	4	.750	25	–	9	.735
No. 12 Syracuse	11	–	5	.688	25	–	9	.735
No. 25 Florida State	10	–	6	.625	24	–	9	.727
Clemson	9	–	7	.563	20	–	13	.606
North Carolina	8	–	8	.500	18	–	15	.545
Georgia Tech	7	–	9	.438	17	–	13	.567
Virginia Tech	6	–	10	.375	22	–	12	.647
Duke	6	–	10	.375	15	–	15	.500
Virginia	5	–	11	.313	12	–	19	.387
Boston College	3	–	13	.188	14	–	16	.467
Pittsburgh	2	–	14	.125	11	–	20	.355
Wake Forest	1	–	15	.063	10	–	20	.333
† 2019 ACC tournament winner As of March 7, 2019; Rankings from AP poll

The 2018–19 Notre Dame Fighting Irish women's basketball team represented the University of Notre Dame during the 2018–19 NCAA Division I women's basketball season. The Fighting Irish, led by 32nd year head coach Muffet McGraw, played their home games at Edmund P. Joyce Center as members of the Atlantic Coast Conference. They were also the defending national champions.

== Previous season ==
The Fighting Irish finished the 2017–18 season at 35–3, 15–1 in ACC play to finish in a tie for first place. They were runners up in the ACC women's tournament losing to Louisville in the final game. They received an at large bid for the NCAA women's tournament as a number one seed. They won the tournament beating other number one seeds, Connecticut and Mississippi State along the way. This was the team's second national title in its history.

== Offseason ==
=== 2018 recruiting class ===
College recruiting
Name	Hometown	School	Height	Weight	Commit date
Katlyn Gilbert; PG	Indianapolis, IN	Heritage Christian	5 ft 10 in (1.78 m)	N/A	
Katlyn Gilbert; PG	Recruit ratings: ESPN: (97)				
Jordan Nixon; PG	New York City, NY	Mary Louis Academy	5 ft 8 in (1.73 m)	N/A	
Jordan Nixon; PG	Recruit ratings: ESPN: (97)				
Danielle Cosgrove; F	Holbrook, NY	Sachem East	6 ft 3 in (1.91 m)	N/A	
Danielle Cosgrove; F	Recruit ratings: ESPN: (95)				
Abby Prohaska; G	Liberty Township, OH	Lakota West	5 ft 10 in (1.78 m)	N/A	
Abby Prohaska; G	Recruit ratings: ESPN: (95)				
Overall recruit ranking:
Note: In many cases, Scout, Rivals, 247Sports, On3, and ESPN may conflict in their listings of height and weight.; In these cases, the average was taken. ESPN grades are on a 100-point scale.; Sources:

== Roster ==
2018–19 Notre Dame Fighting Irish women's basketball team
Players
Coaches

Pos.	#	Name	Height	Year	Previous school	Hometown
G	0	Jordan Nixon	5 ft 8 in (1.73 m)	Fr	Mary Louis Academy	New York City, NY
G	2	Kaitlin Cole	5 ft 10 in (1.78 m)	Jr	Sylvania Northview	Toledo, OH
G	3	Marina Mabrey	5 ft 11 in (1.8 m)	Sr	Manasquan	Belmar, NJ
G	5	Jackie Young	6 ft 0 in (1.83 m)	Jr	Princeton Community	Princeton, IN
G	10	Katlyn Gilbert	5 ft 10 in (1.78 m)	Fr	Heritage Christian	Indianapolis, IN
F	11	Brianna Turner	6 ft 3 in (1.91 m)	RS Sr	Manvel	Pearland, TX
G	12	Abby Prohaska	5 ft 10 in (1.78 m)	Fr	Lakota West	Liberty Township, OH
G	20	Nicole Benz (W)	5 ft 8 in (1.73 m)	So	William S. Hart	Valencia, CA
F	22	Danielle Cosgrove	6 ft 4 in (1.93 m)	Fr	Sachem East	Holbrook, NY
G	24	Arike Ogunbowale	5 ft 8 in (1.73 m)	Sr	Divine Savior Holy Angels	Milwaukee, WI
C	30	Mikayla Vaughn	6 ft 3 in (1.91 m)	So	Paul VI Catholic	Philadelphia, PA
F	32	Jessica Shepard	6 ft 4 in (1.93 m)	Sr	Fremont; Nebraska	Fremont, NE
F	33	Danielle Patterson	6 ft 2 in (1.88 m)	So	The Mary Louis Academy	Brooklyn, NY
F	40	Maureen Butler	6 ft 1 in (1.85 m)	Sr	Dearborn Divine Child	Livonia, MI

Head coach

- Muffet McGraw (Saint Joseph's)

Assistant coach(es)

- Carol Owens (Northern Illinois)
- Niele Ivey (Notre Dame)
- Beth Cunningham (Notre Dame)

Legend

- (C) Team captain
- (S) Suspended
- (I) Ineligible
- (W) Walk-on
- Injured
- Current redshirt

Roster
Last update: October 26, 2018

== Media ==
All Notre Dame games will air on WHPZ Pulse 96.9 FM. Games are streamed online live.

== Schedule and results ==
Date time, TV	Rank^{#}	Opponent^{#}	Result	Record	Site (attendance) city, state
Exhibition
October 30, 2018*; 7:00 pm	No. 1	Lewis	W 107–65	–	Edmund P. Joyce Center (7,556); South Bend, IN
Regular season
November 9, 2018*; 4:00 pm, ACCN Extra	No. 1	Harvard	W 103–58	1–0	Edmund P. Joyce Center (9,149); South Bend, IN
November 12, 2018*; 7:00 pm, ACCN Extra	No. 1	Penn	W 77–55	2–0	Edmund P. Joyce Center (7,854); South Bend, IN
November 17, 2018*; 2:00 pm	No. 1	at No. 15 DePaul	W 101–77	3–0	Wintrust Arena (2,833); Chicago, IL
November 22, 2018*; 3:00 pm	No. 1	vs. Gonzaga; Vancouver Showcase Quarterfinals	W 81–65	4–0	Vancouver Convention Centre (1,018); Vancouver, BC
November 23, 2018*; 9:00 pm	No. 1	vs. Drake; Vancouver Showcase Semifinals	W 82–64	5–0	Vancouver Convention Centre (1,156); Vancouver, BC
November 24, 2018*; 8:00 pm	No. 1	vs. No. 9 Oregon State; Vancouver Showcase Championship	W 91–81	6–0	Vancouver Convention Centre (1,866); Vancouver, BC
November 29, 2018*; 7:00 pm, ESPN2	No. 1	No. 14 Iowa; ACC–Big Ten Women's Challenge	W 105–71	7–0	Edmund P. Joyce Center (7,968); South Bend, IN
December 2, 2018*; 4:00 pm, ESPN	No. 1	No. 2 UConn; Jimmy V Classic/Rivalry	L 71–89	7–1	Edmund P. Joyce Center (9,149); South Bend, IN
December 8, 2018*; 1:00 pm, ESPN+	No. 2	at Toledo	W 72–56	8–1	Savage Arena (6,059); Toledo, OH
December 16, 2018*; 1:00 pm, ACCN Extra	No. 2	Binghamton	W 103–53	9–1	Edmund P. Joyce Center (8,183); South Bend, IN
December 19, 2018*; 7:00 pm, ACCN Extra	No. 2	Western Kentucky	W 94–53	10–1	Edmund P. Joyce Center (7,502); South Bend, IN
December 22, 2018*; 1:30 pm, FS1	No. 2	at No. 19 Marquette	W 87–63	11–1	Al McGuire Center (3,700); Milwaukee, WI
December 30, 2018*; 1:00 pm, ACCN Extra	No. 2	Lehigh	W 95–68	12–1	Edmund P. Joyce Center (9,149); South Bend, IN
January 3, 2019; 7:00 pm, ACCN Extra	No. 2	Pittsburgh	W 100–44	13–1 (1–0)	Edmund P. Joyce Center (8,566); South Bend, IN
January 6, 2019; 3:00 pm, RSN	No. 2	at Georgia Tech	W 76–55	14–1 (2–0)	McCamish Pavilion (3,209); Atlanta, GA
January 10, 2019; 7:00 pm, ESPN	No. 1	No. 2 Louisville	W 82–68	15–1 (3–0)	Edmund P. Joyce Center (9,149); South Bend, IN
January 13, 2019; 1:00 pm, ACCN Extra	No. 1	Wake Forest	W 78–48	16–1 (4–0)	Edmund P. Joyce Center (8,392); South Bend, IN
January 16, 2019; 7:00 pm, ACCN Extra	No. 1	at Virginia Tech	W 80–51	17–1 (5–0)	Cassell Coliseum (2,131); Blacksburg, VA
January 20, 2019; 1:00 pm, ACCN Extra	No. 1	Boston College	W 92–63	18–1 (6–0)	Edmund P. Joyce Center (8,714); South Bend, IN
January 24, 2019*; 7:00 pm, ESPN	No. 1	at Tennessee	W 77–62	19–1	Thompson–Boling Arena (9,154); Knoxville, TN
January 27, 2019; 2:00 pm, ACCN Extra	No. 1	at North Carolina	L 73–78	19–2 (6–1)	Carmichael Arena (4,704); Chapel Hill, NC
January 31, 2019; 7:00 pm, ACCN Extra	No. 5	at Clemson	W 101–63	20–2 (7–1)	Littlejohn Coliseum (2,791); Clemson, SC
February 3, 2019; 12:00 pm, RSN	No. 5	Georgia Tech	W 90–50	21–2 (8–1)	Edmond P. Joyce Center (8,530); South Bend, IN
February 7, 2019; 7:00 pm, ACCN Extra	No. 4	at No. 25 Miami (FL)	L 65–72	21–3 (8–2)	Watsco Center (1,864); Coral Gables, FL
February 10, 2019; 12:00 pm, ESPN	No. 4	No. 24 Florida State	W 97–70	22–3 (9–2)	Edmund P. Joyce Center (8,950); South Bend, IN
February 13, 2019; 7:00 pm, ACCN Extra	No. 6	at Boston College	W 97–47	23–3 (10–2)	Conte Forum (1,598); Chestnut Hill, MA
February 18, 2019; 7:00 pm, ESPN2	No. 5	at No. 9 NC State	W 95–72	24–3 (11–2)	Reynolds Coliseum (5,500); Raleigh, NC
February 21, 2019; 7:00 pm, ACCN Extra	No. 5	Duke	W 89–61	25–3 (12–2)	Edmund P. Joyce Center (8,399); South Bend, IN
February 25, 2019; 6:00 pm, ESPN2	No. 4	at No. 17 Syracuse	W 98–68	26–3 (13–3)	Carrier Dome (7,568); Syracuse, NY
March 3, 2019; 12:30 pm, RSN	No. 4	Virginia	W 103–66	27–3 (14–3)	Edmund P. Joyce Center (9,149); South Bend, IN
ACC Women's Tournament
March 8, 2019; 2:00 pm, RSN	(1) No. 4	vs. (8) North Carolina; Quarterfinals	W 95–77	28–3	Greensboro Coliseum (4,024); Greensboro, NC
March 9, 2019; 12:00 pm, ESPNU	(1) No. 4	vs. (5) No. 18 Syracuse; Semifinals	W 91–66	29–3	Greensboro Coliseum (6,943); Greensboro, NC
March 10, 2019; 12:00 pm, ESPN2	(1) No. 4	vs. (2) No. 3 Louisville; Championship Game	W 99–79	30–3	Greensboro Coliseum (10,104); Greensboro, NC
NCAA Women's Tournament
March 23, 2019*; 11:00 am, ESPN2	(1 C) No. 3	(16 C) Bethune–Cookman; First Round	W 92–50	31–3	Edmund P. Joyce Center (7,885); South Bend, IN
March 25, 2019*; 7:00 pm, ESPN	(1 C) No. 3	(8 C) Michigan State; Second Round	W 91–63	32–3	Edmund P. Joyce Center (6,694); South Bend, IN
March 30, 2019*; 4:00 pm, ESPN2	(1 C) No. 3	vs. (4 C) No. 14 Texas A&M; Sweet Sixteen	W 87–80	33–3	Wintrust Arena; Chicago, IL
April 1, 2019*; 9:00 pm, ESPN2	(1 C) No. 3	vs. (2 C) No. 6 Stanford; Elite Eight	W 84–68	34–3	Wintrust Arena (5,555); Chicago, IL
April 5, 2019*; 9:30 pm, ESPN2	(1 C) No. 3	vs. (2 A) No. 2 Connecticut; Final Four/Rivalry	W 81–76	35–3	Amalie Arena (20,062); Tampa, FL
April 7, 2019*; 6:00 pm, ESPN	(1 C) No. 3	vs. (1 G) No. 1 Baylor; National Championship	L 81–82	35–4	Amalie Arena (20,127); Tampa, FL
*Non-conference game. ^{#}Rankings from AP Poll. (#) Tournament seedings in parentheses. C=Chicago Region. All times are in Eastern.

== Rankings ==
Regular season polls
Poll	Pre- Season	Week 2	Week 3	Week 4	Week 5	Week 6	Week 7	Week 8	Week 9	Week 10	Week 11	Week 12	Week 13	Week 14	Week 15	Week 16	Week 17	Week 18	Week 19	Final
AP	1 (31)	1 (30)	1 (31)	1 (31)	2	2	2	2	2	1 (12)	1 (23)	1 (22)	5	4	6	5	4	4	3	N/A
Coaches	1 (30)	1 (30)	1 (32)	1 (32)	2	2	2	2	2	1 (15)	1 (26)	1 (26)	5 (1)	4 (1)	6	4-T	4	4	3	2

Legend
	Increase in ranking
	Decrease in ranking
	Not ranked previous week
(RV)	Received Votes

The Coaches Poll releases a final poll after the NCAA tournament, but the AP Poll does not release a poll at this time.
