= Rocket Dog Rescue =

American nonprofit organization

- Formation: 2001; 25 years ago
- Founder: Pali Boucher
- Founded at: San Francisco, California, U.S.
- Tax ID no.: 80-0000407
- Legal status: Nonprofit corporation
- Purpose: pet adoption, animal rescue
- Region served: San Francisco Bay Area, California, U.S.
- Website: www.rocketdogrescue.org

Rocket Dog Rescue is a volunteer nonprofit organization based in San Francisco, California, devoted to pet adoption and animal rescue. It is the most prominent of several local private organizations that save dogs from euthanasia by caring for them and finding new families. The program places dogs from animal shelters in the San Francisco Bay Area into foster homes while awaiting adoption. It also treats medical and behavioral problems such as socialization issues, neuters and spays the animals, and provides vaccines, so as to make their animals adoptable.

== History ==
The organization was founded by Pali Boucher, daughter of a hippie mother and Paul Boucher, a program director of San Francisco radio station KSAN (formerly "Jive 95"; now 107.7, "the Bone"). Pali is an HIV victim and former foster child and drug addict whose mother died when she was ten. After being homeless for more than ten years, she adopted an abandoned coonhound puppy from the local dog pound. She named him Leadbelly and lived with him on the street for several more years. After spending six months in jail she then entered the Good Shepherd Gracenter, a women's residential recovery program run by the Roman Catholic order, the Good Shepherd Sisters. She credits the program and her dog with saving her life.

In the late 1990s, Boucher began working for Hopalong Animal Rescue, based in Oakland, California. In 2000, while she was a client at the SF/SPCA Animal Hospital, she inspired her veterinarian, Dr. Ilana Strubel, to found Veterinary Street Outreach Services (VET SOS), a Project of the San Francisco Community Clinic Consoritum's Street Outreach Services Program, a private not-for-profit human healthcare agency, where Pali had received care while homeless. VET SOS is mobile clinic that helps homeless people who are unable to care for their pets.

In 2001, the year after Leadbelly's death, she started Rocket Dog Rescue and won a Points of Light award for volunteerism. She claims to have rescued 150 dogs in the first year. In 2006, the organization was profiled on Discovery's Animal Planet network in a one-hour documentary, Rocket Dogs. By 2007, the organization had saved approximately 3,000 animals, and was spending $150,000 per year of donated funds on veterinary bills for sick animals.

In December 2007, Boucher's home in Bernal Heights burned in a fire, making her homeless once again and killing three dogs, a parrot, and a pigeon for which she was caring. The group has housed most of their dogs in foster homes, and an emergency fund was proposed.

In 2014, Rocket Dog Rescue opened its Urban Sanctuary and Adoption Center in East Oakland. In 2017, Boucher and Rocket Dog Rescue were featured in an episode of Cesar Millan's TV series Dog Nation.
