= The International School of San Francisco =

French international school in San Francisco, California

Coordinates: 37.7750°N 122.4216°W

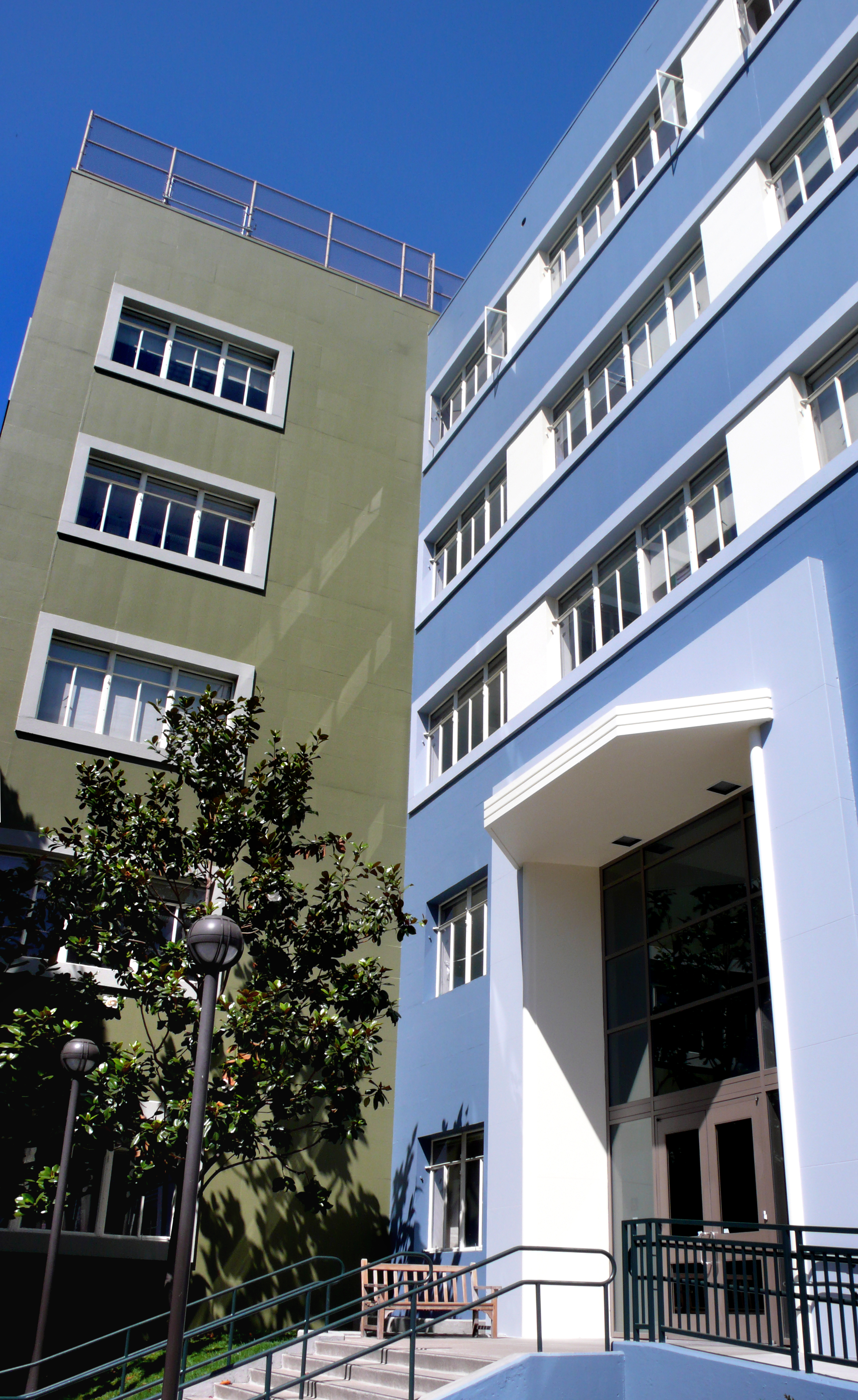
- San Francisco; US

Information
- Type: Private
- Established: 1962
- Head of School: Melinda Bihn, Ed. D.
- Enrollment: 2000
- Website: www.internationalsf.org, alumni.frenchamericansf.org

The International School of San Francisco is an independent co-educational school located in San Francisco, California, United States of America. Until 2023, the school was known as the French American International School. The school provides primary and secondary education.

The lower school and middle schools both follow a bilingual curriculum in French and English. The high school (International High School) offers the International Baccalaureate (IB) degree as well as the French Baccalauréat.

== History ==
The school was founded in 1962 under the name French American Bilingual School.

== Academics ==
The school’s Pre-K through Grade 12 educational program is organized into four divisions: Maternelle, Lower School, Middle School, and High School. In Pre - K through Grade 8 (Maternelle, Lower School and Middle School), the curriculum is French-English bilingual. At International High School, students can choose to pursue a bilingual curriculum or an English curriculum. When applying to the high school in Grade 9, students may choose a first, second or third language. They may also apply for the IB program.

== Programs ==
=== Arts ===
The International School of San Francisco offers many different types of art classes across all grade levels including, visual art, theater, music, and film. The high school has its own theater company called Back à Dos which puts on professional grade performances.

=== Sports ===
The school launched a boys varsity volleyball program in 2021, and went to the state championship for the first time in 2025. It also has a boys basketball team.

Among these sports, The International High School of San Francisco offers Varsity and Junior Varsity Tennis, Varsity Badminton, Varsity Swimming.

== Campuses ==
The International School of San Francisco has 3 main campus locations:

- 150 Oak Street
- 1155 Page Street
- 66 Page Street
