= 2018–19 Southern Illinois Salukis women's basketball team =

Intercollegiate basketball season

2018–19 Southern Illinois Salukis women's basketball
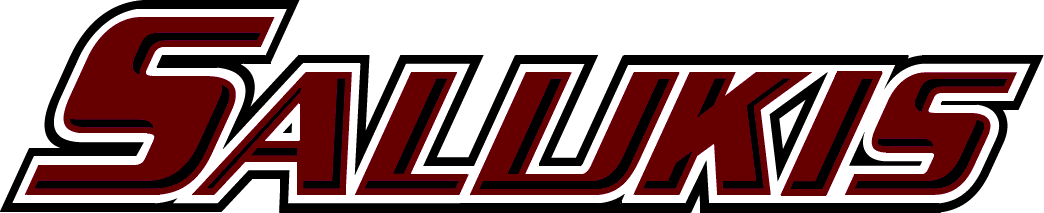

Compass Challenge Champions
- Conference: Missouri Valley Conference
- Record: 15–15 (8–10 The Valley)
- Head coach: Cindy Stein (6th season)
- Assistant coaches: Christelle N'Garsanet; Nicole Collier; Jody Adams
- Home arena: SIU Arena

2018–19 Missouri Valley Conference women's basketball standings
	Conf.				Overall
Team	W		L	PCT	W		L	PCT
Drake	17	–	1	.944	27	–	7	.794
Missouri State †	16	–	2	.889	25	–	10	.714
Northern Iowa	12	–	6	.667	20	–	13	.606
Illinois State	11	–	7	.611	19	–	12	.613
Bradley	10	–	8	.556	20	–	10	.667
Southern Illinois	8	–	10	.444	15	–	15	.500
Loyola–Chicago	6	–	12	.333	13	–	18	.419
Indiana State	5	–	13	.278	11	–	19	.367
Valparaiso	3	–	15	.167	8	–	24	.250
Evansville	2	–	16	.111	4	–	26	.133
† 2019 MVC tournament winner As of March 30, 2019; Rankings from AP poll

The 2018–19 Southern Illinois women's basketball team represented Southern Illinois University Carbondale during the 2018–19 NCAA Division I women's basketball season. The Salukis were led by sixth year head coach Cindy Stein. They played their home games at SIU Arena and were members of the Missouri Valley Conference. They finished the season 15–15, 8–10 in MVC play to finish in sixth place. They lost in the quarterfinals of the Missouri Valley women's tournament to Northern Iowa.

== Roster ==
2018–19 Southern Illinois Salukis women's basketball team
Players
Coaches

Pos.	#	Name	Height	Year	Previous school	Hometown
F	3	Kezia Martin	5 ft 10 in (1.78 m)	RS Sr	Jefferson City; Pittsburg State	Jefferson City, MO
G	5	Caitlin Link	5 ft 10 in (1.78 m)	Fr	Edgewood	Madison, WI
G	10	Brittney Patrick	5 ft 6 in (1.68 m)	Jr	Bolingbrook	Bolingbrook, IL
G	12	Makenzie Silvey	5 ft 11 in (1.8 m)	So	Edwardsville	Glen Carbon, IL
G/F	15	Caitlyn Claussen	6 ft 0 in (1.83 m)	RS So	Wamego	Manhattan, KS
F	20	Gabby Walker (redshirt)	6 ft 0 in (1.83 m)	Jr	St. Charles; Lindenwood	St. Charles, MO
G	21	Payton McCallister	5 ft 10 in (1.78 m)	Fr	Rock Bridge	Columbia, MO
G	23	Kristen Nelson	5 ft 9 in (1.75 m)	Jr	Harrison	Farmington Hills, MI
F	25	Abby Brockmeyer	6 ft 1 in (1.85 m)	So	Lincolnwood	Raymond, IL
F/C	31	Lauren Hartman	6 ft 3 in (1.91 m)	Jr	Tremont	Tremont, IL
F	33	Rachel Pudlowski	5 ft 11 in (1.8 m)	So	Fort Zumwalt	O'Fallon, MO
F	34	Nicole Martin	6 ft 1 in (1.85 m)	Jr	Jefferson City	Jefferson City, MO
F/C	35	Celina VanHyfte	6 ft 0 in (1.83 m)	RS Sr	Annawan	Annawa, IL

Head coach

- Cindy Stein (Illinois)

Assistant coach(es)

- Christelle N'Garsanet (Missouri)
- Nicole Collier (Missouri Western)
- Jody Adams (Tennessee)

Legend

- (C) Team captain
- (S) Suspended
- (I) Ineligible
- (W) Walk-on
- Injured
- Current redshirt

Roster

== Schedule ==
Date time, TV	Rank^{#}	Opponent^{#}	Result	Record	Site (attendance) city, state
Exhibition
Oct 26, 2018*; 6:00 pm		McKendree	W 73–39		SIU Arena (440); Carbondale, IL
Nov 2, 2018*; 6:00 pm		Westminster (MO)	W 118–38		SIU Arena (398); Carbondale, IL
Non-conference regular season
Nov 9, 2018*; 6:00 pm		at UT Martin	L 94–95	0–1	Skyhawk Arena (1,415); Martin, TN
Nov 14, 2018*; 12:00 pm, ESPN+		Southeast Missouri State	W 60–40	1–1	SIU Arena (2,500); Carbondale, IL
Nov 17, 2018*; 2:00 pm, ESPN3		Marshall	W 58–49	2–1	SIU Arena (500); Carbondale, IL
Nov 20, 2018*; 11:00 am		at Western Kentucky	L 76–83	2–2	E. A. Diddle Arena (4,792); Bowling Green, KY
Nov 23, 2018*; 2:00 pm		vs. Hartford; South Point Thanksgiving Shootout	W 72–50	3–2	South Point Arena (586); Enterprise, NV
Nov 24, 2018*; 4:30 pm		vs. No. 19 Arizona State; South Point Thanksgiving Shootout	L 38–82	3–3	South Point Arena; Enterprise, NV
Nov 29, 2018*; 7:00 pm		at Saint Louis	L 58–62	3–4	Chaifetz Arena (488); St. Louis, MO
Dec 7, 2018*; 7:00 pm, ESPN+		Northern Illinois; Compass Challenge	W 82–73	4–4	SIU Arena (560); Carbondale, IL
Dec 8, 2018*; 3:30 pm, ESPN3		Eastern Illinois; Compass Challenge	W 73–59	5–4	SIU Arena (505); Carbondale, IL
Dec 18, 2018*; 5:00 pm		at Murray State	W 65–59	6–4	CFSB Center; Murray, KY
Dec 21, 2018*; 5:00 pm, ESPN+		IUPUI	W 78–73 ^{OT}	7–4	SIU Arena (502); Carbondale, IL
Missouri Valley regular season
Jan 4, 2019; 6:00 pm, ESPN+		Evansville	W 67–47	8–4 (1–0)	SIU Arena (503); Carbondale, IL
Jan 6, 2019; 2:00 pm, ESPN+		Indiana State	L 58–61	8–5 (1–1)	SIU Arena (497); Carbondale, IL
Jan 13, 2019; 2:00 pm, ESPN+		at Missouri State	L 51–66	8–6 (1–2)	JQH Arena (1,864); Springfield, MO
Jan 18, 2019; 7:00 pm, ESPN3		at Illinois State	L 52–60	8–7 (1–3)	Redbird Arena (631); Normal, IL
Jan 20, 2019; 2:00 pm, ESPN+		at Bradley	L 53–58 ^{OT}	8–8 (1–4)	Renaissance Coliseum (656); Peoria, IL
Jan 25, 2019; 6:00 pm, ESPN3		Valparaiso	W 87–65	9–8 (2–4)	SIU Arena (461); Carbondale, IL
Jan 27, 2019; 2:00 pm, ESPN+		Loyola–Chicago	W 74–63	10–8 (3–4)	SIU Arena (368); Carbondale, IL
Feb 1, 2019; 7:00 pm, ESPN+		at Northern Iowa	L 53–65	10–9 (3–5)	McLeod Center (1,175); Cedar Falls, IA
Feb 3, 2019; 2:00 pm, ESPN+		at Drake	L 66–94	10–10 (3–6)	Knapp Center (3,683); Des Moines, IA
Feb 8, 2019; 6:00 pm, ESPN3		Missouri State	L 58–61	10–11 (3–7)	SIU Arena (361); Carbondale, IL
Feb 15, 2019; 2:00 pm, ESPN+		Bradley	W 62–55	11–11 (4–7)	SIU Arena (356); Carbondale, IL
Feb 17, 2019; 2:00 pm, ESPN+		Illinois State	L 66–68	11–12 (4–8)	SIU Arena (446); Carbondale, IL
Feb 22, 2019; 7:00 pm, ESPN3		at Loyola–Chicago	W 64–41	12–12 (5–8)	Joseph J. Gentile Arena (367); Chicago, IL
Feb 24, 2019; 1:00 pm, ESPN3		at Valparaiso	W 58–47	13–12 (6–8)	Athletics–Recreation Center (420); Valparaiso, IN
Mar 1, 2019; 6:00 pm, ESPN+		No. 23 Drake	L 64–71	13–13 (6–9)	SIU Arena (415); Carbondale, IL
Mar 3, 2019; 2:00 pm, ESPN+		Northern Iowa	L 67–76	13–14 (6–10)	SIU Arena (453); Carbondale, IL
Mar 7, 2019; 6:00 pm, ESPN+		at Indiana State	W 80–61	14–14 (7–10)	Hulman Center (1,440); Terre Haute, IN
Mar 9, 2019; 1:00 pm, ESPN+		at Evansville	W 80–60	15–14 (8–10)	Meeks Family Fieldhouse (307); Evansville, IN
Missouri Valley Women's Tournament
Mar 15, 2019; 2:30 pm, ESPN+	(6)	vs. (3) Northern Iowa; Quarterfinals	L 63–66	15–15	TaxSlayer Center (1,542); Moline, IL
*Non-conference game. ^{#}Rankings from AP Poll. (#) Tournament seedings in parentheses. All times are in Central Time.

== See also ==
2018–19 Southern Illinois Salukis men's basketball team
