= Illinois CC =

Illinois CC may refer to:

- Illinois Central College
- University of Illinois Chicago, formerly known as Illinois Chicago Circle

== See also ==
- Southwestern Illinois Community College
