= Western Michigan Broncos basketball =

Western Michigan Broncos basketball may refer to either of the basketball teams that represent Western Michigan University:

- Western Michigan Broncos men's basketball
- Western Michigan Broncos women's basketball
