= 2019 Missouri Valley Conference women's basketball tournament =

- Classification: Division I
- Season: 2018–19
- Teams: 10
- Site: TaxSlayer Center; Moline, Illinois
- Champions: Missouri State (11th title)
- Winning coach: Kellie Harper (2nd title)
- MVP: Alexa Willard (Missouri State)
- Attendance: 7,768
- Television: ESPN+

2018–19 Missouri Valley Conference women's basketball standings
	Conf.				Overall
Team	W		L	PCT	W		L	PCT
Drake	17	–	1	.944	27	–	7	.794
Missouri State †	16	–	2	.889	25	–	10	.714
Northern Iowa	12	–	6	.667	20	–	13	.606
Illinois State	11	–	7	.611	19	–	12	.613
Bradley	10	–	8	.556	20	–	10	.667
Southern Illinois	8	–	10	.444	15	–	15	.500
Loyola–Chicago	6	–	12	.333	13	–	18	.419
Indiana State	5	–	13	.278	11	–	19	.367
Valparaiso	3	–	15	.167	8	–	24	.250
Evansville	2	–	16	.111	4	–	26	.133
† 2019 MVC tournament winner As of March 30, 2019; Rankings from AP poll

The 2019 Missouri Valley Conference women's basketball tournament (also known as the Hoops in the Heartland Tournament) was part of the 2018–19 NCAA Division I women's basketball season and was played in Moline, Illinois March 14–17, 2019, at the TaxSlayer Center. Missouri State defeated Drake to receive the Missouri Valley Conference's automatic bid to the 2019 NCAA tournament. Alexa Willard was named the tournament's Most Outstanding Player.

== Tie-breaking procedures ==
- 1. Winner of head-to-head competition
- 2. If three or more teams are tied, regular-season competition among the tied teams shall be pooled into a "mini round-robin." Teams shall be ranked according to their position in such a round-robin.
- 3. Power rating using MVC games:

Team place	Road win	Home win
1st	20 pts.	19 pts.
2nd	18 pts.	17 pts.
3rd	16 pts.	15 pts.
4th	14 pts.	13 pts.
5th	12 pts.	11 pts.
6th	10 pts.	19 pts.
7th	8 pts.	7 pts.
8th	6 pts.	5 pts.
9th	4 pts.	3 pts.
10th	2 pts.	1 pts.

- 4. The most recently available NCAA RPI ranking

== Seeds ==
2018 Missouri Valley Conference women's basketball tournament seeds
Seed	School	Conf.	Over.
1	‡ # Drake	17–1	25–5
2	# Missouri State	16–2	20–9
3	# Northern Iowa	12–6	19–11
4	# Illinois State	11–7	18–11
5	# Bradley	10–6	20–9
6	# Southern Illinois	8–10	15–14
7	Loyola–Chicago	6–12	12–17
8	Indiana State	5–13	11–18
9	Valparaiso	3–15	7–23
10	Evansville	2–16	4–25
‡ – Missouri Valley Conference regular-season champions and tournament No. 1 seed # – Received a single bye in the conference tournament Overall records include all games played in the Missouri Valley Conference tournament.

== Schedule ==
Session	Game	Time*	Matchup^{#}	Television	Attendance
First round – Thursday, March 14
1	1	4:00 p.m.	No. 8 Indiana State vs. No. 9 Valparaiso	ESPN+	905
1	2	7:00 p.m.	No. 7 Loyola vs No. 10 Evansville	ESPN+	905
Quarterfinals – Friday, March 15
2	3	12:00 p.m.	No. 1 Drake vs. No. 9 Valparaiso	ESPN+	1,509
2	4	2:30 p.m.	No. 4 Illinois State vs. No. 5 Bradley	ESPN+	1,509
3	5	6:00 p.m.	No. 2 Missouri State vs. No. 7 Loyola	ESPN+	1,542
3	6	8:30 p.m.	No. 3 Northern Iowa vs. No. 6 Southern Illinois	ESPN+	1,542
Semifinals – Saturday, March 16
4	7	1:30 p.m.	No. 1 Drake vs. No. 4 Illinois State	ESPN+	2,254
4	8	4:00 p.m.	No. 2 Missouri State vs. No. 3 Northern Iowa	ESPN+	2,254
Final – Sunday, March 17
5	9	2:00 p.m.	No. 1 Drake vs. No. 2 Missouri State	ESPN+	1,558
* – Game times in CT # – Rankings denote tournament seed

== Tournament bracket ==
First round Thursday, March 14; ESPN+
8	Indiana State	77
9	Valparaiso	79
7	Loyola	90
10	Evansville	80

Quarterfinals; Friday, March 15; ESPN+
1	Drake	86
9	Valparaiso	58
4	Illinois State	61
5	Bradley	55
2	Missouri State	59
7	Loyola-Chicago	50
3	Northern Iowa	66
6	Southern Illinois	63

Semifinals; Saturday, March 16; ESPN+
1	Drake	65
4	Illinois State	54
2	Missouri State	89
3	Northern Iowa	64

Championship; Sunday, March 17; ESPN+
1	Drake	79
2	Missouri State	94

== See also ==
- 2019 Missouri Valley Conference men's basketball tournament
