= Lorene Ramsey =

American athlete

Medal record

Women's basketball

Assistant coach for United States

World University Games
Silver medal – second place	1981 Bucharest, Romania	Team competition

Lorene Ramsey is an American college athletics coach. In 1968, Ramsey joined the staff of Illinois Central College, a community college in East Peoria, Illinois. There, before the passing of Title IX, she started the women's athletic program. She coached the softball team for 28 years, compiling an overall record of 840–309 and two NJCAA National Softball Championships. She also coached the women's basketball team for 33 seasons amassing a record of 887–197 while winning four NJCAA Women's Basketball Championships. She has been inducted into 10 halls of fame including the National Softball Hall of Fame and the Women's Basketball Hall of Fame. She was a founding officer of the National Fastpitch Coaches Association and, as a player, was inducted into the ASA Hall of Fame in 1987.

Education	Records	Accolades/Championships
Illinois State University, B.A. (1955); University of North Carolina- Greensboro, M.A. (1963); Bradley University, M.A. (1971)	As a pitcher with the Pekin Lettes: 401–90; As Illinois Central College softball coach: 840–309; As Illinois Central College women's basketball coach: 764–180	Inductions into the ASA Hall of Fame and Women's Basketball Hall of Fame; National Championships, Illinois Central College softball: 1982, 1998; National Championships, Illinois Central College women's basketball: 1992, 1993, 1998, 1999

== History ==
Lorene Ramsey was born July 10, 1936, in St. Louis, Missouri. In 1955, she moved from St. Louis to central Illinois to pitch for the Pekin Lettes. A successful athlete in her own right, she pitched for 18 years there and had an overall record of 401–90. In 1965 she pitched 98 1/3 scoreless innings. She was a four-time ASA All-American. In 1968, she left the teaching staff of Pekin High School to join the staff of Illinois Central College, where she helped develop an intramural sports program for both men and women. This program turned into Illinois Central College's current intercollegiate athletic program. Throughout the history of Illinois Central College women's sports, hundreds of women have gone on to receive NCAA Division I and II athletic scholarships to four-year colleges and universities.

== USA Basketball ==
Ramsey was the assistant coach of the team representing the US at the World University Games held in Bucharest, Romania in July 1981. The team started with a game against Finland and won easily, 68–49. They trailed at halftime in their next game against China, but came back to win a close game 76–74. After beating Poland, they played Czechoslovakia in a game that was close at the half, but the USA team went on to win 86–67. In the following game against Canada, the USA team was again behind at the half, but played a close match in the second half and pulled ahead to win 79–76. Despite being undefeated, they needed a win against Romania to advance to the gold medal came. They had only a one-point lead at halftime, but went on to win 75–64 to meet the undefeated USSR for the gold medal. The USA fell behind by sixteen and could not close the gap—the USSR team won 98–79 to claim the gold medal, leaving the US with the silver. Denise Curry was the leading scorer for the USA team with 18.1 points per game. Anne Donovan led the team in rebounds with 6.7 per game.

== See also ==
- National Fastpitch Coaches Association Hall of Fame

== Sources ==
- Illinois Central College
- Amateur Softball Association
- National Fastpitch Coaches Association
