= 2018–19 Missouri State Lady Bears basketball team =

Intercollegiate basketball season

2018–19 Missouri State Lady Bears basketball

Missouri Valley Tournament champions

NCAA tournament, Sweet Sixteen
- Conference: Missouri Valley Conference

Ranking
- Coaches: No. 24
- Record: 25–10 (16–2 The Valley)
- Head coach: Kellie Harper (6th season)
- Assistant coaches: Jon Harper; Jennifer Sullivan; Jackie Stiles
- Home arena: JQH Arena

2018–19 Missouri Valley Conference women's basketball standings
	Conf.				Overall
Team	W		L	PCT	W		L	PCT
Drake	17	–	1	.944	27	–	7	.794
Missouri State †	16	–	2	.889	25	–	10	.714
Northern Iowa	12	–	6	.667	20	–	13	.606
Illinois State	11	–	7	.611	19	–	12	.613
Bradley	10	–	8	.556	20	–	10	.667
Southern Illinois	8	–	10	.444	15	–	15	.500
Loyola–Chicago	6	–	12	.333	13	–	18	.419
Indiana State	5	–	13	.278	11	–	19	.367
Valparaiso	3	–	15	.167	8	–	24	.250
Evansville	2	–	16	.111	4	–	26	.133
† 2019 MVC tournament winner As of March 30, 2019; Rankings from AP poll

The 2018–19 Missouri State Lady Bears basketball team represented Missouri State University during the 2018–19 NCAA Division I women's basketball season. The Lady Bears, led by sixth year head coach Kellie Harper, played their home games at JQH Arena and were members of the Missouri Valley Conference. They finished the season 25–10, 16–2 in MVC play to finish in second place. They won the Missouri Valley women's tournament to earn an automatic trip to the NCAA Women's Basketball where upset DePaul and Iowa State in the first and second rounds to advance to the sweet sixteen for the first time 2001 where they lost to Stanford.

On April 8, Harper left after 6 seasons to accept the head coaching job at her alma mater, Tennessee. She finish with a 6 year record of 118–79.

== Roster ==
2018–19 Missouri State Bears women's basketball team
Players
Coaches

Pos.	#	Name	Height	Year	Previous school	Hometown
G	1	Danielle Gitzen	5 ft 10 in (1.78 m)	Sr	Chanhassen High	Victoria, MN
G	2	Elle Ruffridge	5 ft 3 in (1.6 m)	So	Pocahontas Area High	Pocahontas, IA
F	4	Abby Hipp	6 ft 2 in (1.88 m)	So	St. Pius X High	Kansas City, MO
G	11	Brice Calip	5 ft 8 in (1.73 m)	RS So	Sapulpa High	Sapulpa, OK
F	12	Sydney Schultz	6 ft 2 in (1.88 m)	So	Oswego East High	Aurora, IL
G	21	Sydney Wilson	5 ft 11 in (1.8 m)	Fr	Olathe East High	Overland Park, KS
G	22	Alexa Willard	6 ft 2 in (1.88 m)	Jr	Stoutland High	Lebanon, MO
G	23	Mya Bhinhar	5 ft 9 in (1.75 m)	Fr	Owasso High School	Owasso, OK
G	24	Bri Ellis	5 ft 7 in (1.7 m)	RS So	Rock Bridge High	Columbia, MO
F	25	Dariauna Lewis	6 ft 0 in (1.83 m)	Fr	North High	Omaha, NE
F	30	Shameka Ealy	6 ft 1 in (1.85 m)	Jr	Russellville High	Russellville, AR
F	32	Jasmine Franklin	6 ft 1 in (1.85 m)	Fr	Fayetteville	Fayetteville, AR
G	34	Sydney Manning	5 ft 9 in (1.75 m)	Fr	Cashion High	Edmond, OK
C	50	Emily Gartner	6 ft 4 in (1.93 m)	RS So	Hiawatha High	Hiawatha, KS

Head coach

- Kellie Harper (Tennessee)

Assistant coach(es)

- Jon Harper (Auburn)
- Jennifer Sullivan (Memphis)
- Jackie Stiles (Missouri State)

Legend

- (C) Team captain
- (S) Suspended
- (I) Ineligible
- (W) Walk-on
- Injured
- Current redshirt

Roster

== Schedule ==
Date time, TV	Rank^{#}	Opponent^{#}	Result	Record	Site (attendance) city, state
Exhibition
Oct 29, 2018*; 7:00 pm		Central Missouri	L 64–70		JQH Arena (1,805); Springfield, MO
Nov 4, 2018*; 7:00 pm		Lincoln	W 100–54		JQH Arena (1,767); Springfield, MO
Non-conference regular season
Nov 10, 2018*; 2:00 pm, KOZL		at Wichita State	L 60–63 ^{OT}	0–1	Charles Koch Arena (1,967); Wichita, KS
Nov 14, 2018*; 7:00 pm		at No. 16 Missouri	L 61–65	0–2	Mizzou Arena (4,111); Columbia, MO
Nov 17, 2018*; 2:00 pm, ESPN3		Ball State	W 74–54	1–2	JQH Arena (2,018); Springfield, MO
Nov 24, 2018*; 4:00 pm		at Santa Clara	L 73–77	1–3	Leavey Center (252); Santa Clara, CA
Dec 1, 2018*; 3:00 pm		at North Texas	L 76–83 ^{OT}	1–4	The Super Pit (1,377); Denton, TX
Dec 4, 2018*; 7:00 pm, ESPN+		South Dakota	L 74–85	1–5	JQH Arena (1,820); Springfield, MO
Dec 9, 2018*; 11:00 am, BTN		at Indiana	L 74–98	1–6	Simon Skjodt Assembly Hall (3,463); Bloomington, IN
Dec 16, 2018*; 2:00 pm, KOZL		No. 21 Gonzaga	L 67–70	1–7	JQH Arena (2,066); Springfield, MO
Dec 20, 2018*; 6:30 pm		vs. Louisiana Tech; Roo Holiday Classic	W 82–70	2–7	Swinney Recreation Center (322); Kansas City, MO
Dec 21, 2018*; 3:00 pm		vs. SIU Edwardsville; Roo Holiday Classic	W 68–65	3–7	Swinney Recreation Center (374); Kansas City, MO
Dec 30, 2018*; 2:00 pm, ESPN+		Little Rock	W 48–44	4–7	JQH Arena (2,045); Springfield, MO
Missouri Valley regular season
Jan 4, 2019; 7:00 pm, ESPN+		Indiana State	W 71–58	5–7 (1–0)	JQH Arena (2,015); Springfield, MO
Jan 6, 2019; 2:00 pm, KOZL		Evansville	W 88–66	6–7 (2–0)	JQH Arena (1,934); Springfield, MO
Jan 13, 2019; 2:00 pm, ESPN+		Southern Illinois	W 66–51	7–7 (3–0)	JQH Arena (1,864); Springfield, MO
Jan 18, 2019; 7:00 pm, ESPN3		at Bradley	W 68–56	8–7 (4–0)	Renaissance Coliseum (515); Peoria, IL
Jan 20, 2019; 2:00 pm, KOZL		at Illinois State	W 59–47	9–7 (5–0)	Redbird Arena (782); Normal, IL
Jan 25, 2019; 7:00 pm, ESPN+		Loyola–Chicago	W 84–49	10–7 (6–0)	JQH Arena (2,757); Springfield, MO
Jan 27, 2019; 2:00 pm, KOZL		Valparaiso	W 108–63	11–7 (7–0)	JQH Arena (2,886); Springfield, MO
Feb 1, 2019; 6:00 pm, ESPN+		at Drake	W 85–79	12–7 (8–0)	Knapp Center (3,101); Des Moines, IA
Feb 3, 2019; 2:00 pm, ESPN3		at Northern Iowa	W 63–58	13–7 (10–0)	McLeod Center (1,485); Cedar Falls, IA
Feb 8, 2019; 6:00 pm, ESPN3		at Southern Illinois	W 70–58	14–7 (10–0)	SIU Arena (361); Carbondale, IL
Feb 15, 2019; 7:00 pm, ESPN+		Illinois State	L 56–60	14–8 (10–1)	JQH Arena (1,750); Springfield, MO
Feb 17, 2019; 2:00 pm, ESPN+		Bradley	W 82–60	15–8 (11–1)	JQH Arena (2,235); Springfield, MO
Feb 22, 2019; 7:00 pm, ESPN+		at Valparaiso	W 84–49	16–8 (12–1)	Athletics–Recreation Center (277); Valparaiso, IN
Feb 24, 2019; 1:00 pm, ESPN+		at Loyola–Chicago	W 85–58	17–8 (13–1)	Joseph J. Gentile Arena (372); Chicago, IL
Mar 1, 2019; 7:00 pm, ESPN+		Northern Iowa	W 58–48	18–8 (14–1)	JQH Arena (3,112); Springfield, MO
Mar 3, 2019; 2:00 pm, KOZL		No. 23 Drake	L 61–70	18–9 (14–2)	JQH Arena (3,827); Springfield, MO
Mar 7, 2019; 6:00 pm, ESPN+		at Evansville	W 88–46	19–9 (15–2)	Meeks Family Fieldhouse (301); Evansville, IN
Mar 9, 2019; 1:00 pm, KOZL		at Indiana State	W 76–66	20–9 (16–2)	Hulman Center (1,456); Terre Haute, IN
Missouri Valley Women's Tournament
Mar 15, 2019; 6:00 pm, ESPN+	(2)	vs. (7) Loyola–Chicago; Quarterfinals	W 59–50	21–9	TaxSlayer Center; Moline, IL
Mar 16, 2019; 4:00 pm, ESPN+	(2)	vs. (3) Northern Iowa; Semifinals	W 89–64	22–9	TaxSlayer Center (2,254); Moline, IL
Mar 17, 2019; 2:00 pm, ESPN+	(2)	vs. (1) No. 21 Drake; Championship Game	W 94–79	23–9	TaxSlayer Center (1,558); Moline, IL
NCAA Women's Tournament
Mar 23, 2019*; 2:30 pm, ESPN2	(11 C)	vs. (6 C) No. 24 DePaul; First Round	W 89–78	24–9	Hilton Coliseum; Ames, IA
Mar 25, 2019*; 8:00 pm, ESPN	(11 C)	at (3 C) No. 13 Iowa State; Second Round	W 69–60	25–9	Hilton Coliseum (5,809); Ames, IA
Mar 30, 2019*; 5:30 pm, ESPN2	(11 C)	vs. (2 C) No. 7 Stanford; Sweet Sixteen	L 46–55	25–10	Wintrust Arena (7,714); Chicago, IL
*Non-conference game. ^{#}Rankings from AP Poll. (#) Tournament seedings in parentheses. C=Chicago Region. All times are in Central Time.

== Rankings ==
2018–19 NCAA Division I women's basketball rankings

Regular season polls
Poll	Pre- Season	Week 2	Week 3	Week 4	Week 5	Week 6	Week 7	Week 8	Week 9	Week 10	Week 11	Week 12	Week 13	Week 14	Week 15	Week 16	Week 17	Week 18	Week 19	Final
AP																				N/A
Coaches																				24

Legend
	Increase in ranking
	Decrease in ranking
	Not ranked previous week
(RV)	Received Votes
(NR)	Not Ranked

== See also ==
- 2018–19 Missouri State Bears basketball team
