= 2018–19 Valparaiso Crusaders women's basketball team =

Intercollegiate basketball season

2018–19 Valparaiso Crusaders women's basketball
- Conference: Missouri Valley Conference
- Record: 8–24 (3–15 MVC)
- Head coach: Mary Evans (1st season)
- Assistant coaches: Mary Gleason; Gabby Johnson; Tyeasha Moss
- Home arena: Athletics–Recreation Center

2018–19 Missouri Valley Conference women's basketball standings
	Conf.				Overall
Team	W		L	PCT	W		L	PCT
Drake	17	–	1	.944	27	–	7	.794
Missouri State †	16	–	2	.889	25	–	10	.714
Northern Iowa	12	–	6	.667	20	–	13	.606
Illinois State	11	–	7	.611	19	–	12	.613
Bradley	10	–	8	.556	20	–	10	.667
Southern Illinois	8	–	10	.444	15	–	15	.500
Loyola–Chicago	6	–	12	.333	13	–	18	.419
Indiana State	5	–	13	.278	11	–	19	.367
Valparaiso	3	–	15	.167	8	–	24	.250
Evansville	2	–	16	.111	4	–	26	.133
† 2019 MVC tournament winner As of March 30, 2019; Rankings from AP poll

The 2018–19 Valparaiso Crusaders women's basketball team represented Valparaiso University during the 2018–19 NCAA Division I women's basketball season. The Crusaders, led by first-year head coach Mary Evans, played their home games at the Athletics–Recreation Center as members of the Missouri Valley Conference. They sought to finish their first NCAA Tournament since 2004.

== Roster ==
2018–19 Valparaiso Crusaders women's basketball team
Players
Coaches

Pos.	#	Name	Height	Year	Previous school	Hometown
G	0	Maya Meredith	5 ft 7 in (1.7 m)	Jr	Cathedral	Indianapolis, IN
G	2	Meredith Hamlet	5 ft 8 in (1.73 m)	Sr	McBain	McBain, MI
G	3	Hannah Schaub	5 ft 6 in (1.68 m)	Jr	Park Center	Brooklyn Park, MN
G	4	Ilysse Pitts	5 ft 7 in (1.7 m)	Fr	Montini	Aurora, IL
G	5	Shay Frederick	5 ft 7 in (1.7 m)	Fr	Hortonville	Greenville, WI
F	11	Marlee Profitt	6 ft 2 in (1.88 m)	So	Medina	Medina, OH
G/F	12	Addison Stoller	6 ft 0 in (1.83 m)	So	Cissna Park	Cissna Park, IL
F	13	Ella Ellenson	6 ft 2 in (1.88 m)	So	Rice Lake	Rice Lake, WI
F	15	Nicole Johnanson	6 ft 5 in (1.96 m)	Fr	Herscher	Herscher, IL
G	20	Nicole Konieczny	6 ft 9 in (2.06 m)	So	South Bend Saint Joseph	Granger, IN
F	22	Bryce Blood	6 ft 2 in (1.88 m)	So	Whitmer	Toledo, OH
G	24	Carrie Weinman	5 ft 9 in (1.75 m)	RS So	Denver	Glenview, IL
G/F	25	Grace Hales	6 ft 0 in (1.83 m)	Jr	Westview	Cromwell, IN
G/F	33	Allison Schofield	5 ft 9 in (1.75 m)	Sr	Heritage Christian	McCordsville, IN
G	34	Taylor Richards	6 ft 0 in (1.83 m)	So	Chippewa	Doylestown, OH
F	40	Caitlin Morrison	6 ft 2 in (1.88 m)	Jr	Glenbrook South	Glenview, IL

Head coach

- Mary Evans (Georgia Southern)

Assistant coach(es)

- Mary Gleason (SMU)
- Gabby Johnson (Thomas More)
- Tyeasha Moss (Xavier)

Legend

- (C) Team captain
- (S) Suspended
- (I) Ineligible
- (W) Walk-on
- Injured
- Current redshirt

Roster
Last update: November 4, 2018

== Schedule and results ==
Date time, TV	Rank^{#}	Opponent^{#}	Result	Record	Site (attendance) city, state
Exhibition
Dec 31, 2018*; 12:00 pm		IU Northwest	W 85–59		Athletics–Recreation Center (517); Valparaiso, IN
Non-conference regular season
Nov 7, 2018*; 7:00 pm, ESPN+/NBSC+		at UIC	L 65–75	0–1	Credit Union 1 Arena (806); Chicago, IL
Nov 11, 2018*; 1:00 pm, ESPN+		North Dakota	L 56–62	0–2	Athletics–Recreation Center (590); Valparaiso, IN
Nov 14, 2018*; 7:00 pm		at Illinois	L 54–73	0–3	State Farm Center (1,163); Champaign, IL
Nov 16, 2018*; 5:30 pm, ESPN+		at Morehead State; Vinewood Farm Classic	L 62–68	0–4	Ellis Johnson Arena (877); Morehead, KY
Nov 17, 2018*; 6:30 pm		vs. St. Francis Brooklyn; Vinewood Farm Classic	W 78–76	1–4	Ellis Johnson Arena (100); Morehead, KY
Nov 26, 2018*; 7:00 pm, ESPN+		Toledo	L 59–65	1–5	Athletics–Recreation Center (575); Valparaiso, IN
Nov 29, 2018*; 5:00 pm		at Chicago State	W 76–70	2–5	Jones Convocation Center (144); Chicago, IL
Dec 2, 2018*; 4:00 pm, ESPN+		Eastern Illinois	W 62–60	3–5	Athletics–Recreation Center (476); Valparaiso, IN
Dec 8, 2018*; 1:00 pm, ESPN3		Miami (OH)	L 47–68	3–6	Athletics–Recreation Center (589); Valparaiso, IN
Dec 16, 2018*; 1:00 pm, ESPN+		North Dakota State	L 48–51	3–7	Athletics–Recreation Center (368); Valparaiso, IN
Dec 19, 2018*; 6:00 pm		at Purdue Fort Wayne	W 68–64	4–7	Hilliard Gates Sports Center (449); Fort Wayne, IN
Dec 21, 2018*; 5:00 pm, ESPN3		Bowling Green	L 72–79	4–8	Athletics–Recreation Center (402); Valparaiso, IN
MVC regular season
Jan 6, 2019; 1:00 pm, ESPN3		at Loyola–Chicago	L 54–80	4–9 (0–1)	Joseph J. Gentile Arena (212); Chicago, IL
Jan 11, 2019; 7:00 pm, ESPN+		at Northern Iowa	L 52–71	4–10 (0–2)	McLeod Center (992); Cedar Falls, IA
Jan 13, 2019; 2:00 pm, ESPN3		at Drake	L 53–84	4–11 (0–3)	Knapp Center (3,121); Des Moines, IA
Jan 18, 2019; 7:00 pm, ESPN+		Indiana State	L 82–86 ^{OT}	4–12 (0–4)	Athletics–Recreation Center (485); Valparaiso, IN
Jan 20, 2019; 1:00 pm, ESPN3		Evansville	W 93–49	5–12 (1–4)	Athletics–Recreation Center (399); Valparaiso, IN
Jan 25, 2019; 6:00 pm, ESPN3		at Southern Illinois	L 65–87	5–13 (1–5)	SIU Arena (461); Carbondale, IL
Jan 27, 2019; 2:00 pm, ESPN3		at Missouri State	L 63–108	5–14 (1–6)	JQH Arena (2,886); Springfield, MO
Feb 1, 2019; 7:00 pm, ESPN+		Bradley	W 76–73	6–14 (2–6)	Athletics–Recreation Center (377); Valparaiso, IN
Feb 3, 2019; 1:00 pm, ESPN3		Illinois State	L 67–70	6–15 (2–7)	Athletics–Recreation Center (355); Valparaiso, IN
Feb 8, 2019; 5:00 pm, ESPN+		Drake	L 62–88	6–16 (2–8)	Athletics–Recreation Center (328); Valparaiso, IN
Feb 10, 2019; 11:00 am		Northern Iowa	L 56–64	6–17 (2–9)	Athletics–Recreation Center (576); Valparaiso, IN
Feb 15, 2019; 6:00 pm, ESPN+		at Evansville	L 65–77	6–18 (2–10)	Meeks Family Fieldhouse (334); Evansville, IN
Feb 17, 2019; 1:00 pm, ESPN+		at Indiana State	L 59–67	6–19 (2–11)	Hulman Center (1,490); Terre Haute, IN
Feb 22, 2019; 7:00 pm, ESPN+		Missouri State	L 58–77	6–20 (2–12)	Athletics–Recreation Center (277); Valparaiso, IN
Feb 24, 2019; 1:00 pm, ESPN3		Southern Illinois	L 47–58	6–21 (2–13)	Athletics–Recreation Center (420); Valparaiso, IN
Feb 28, 2019; 7:00 pm, ESPN+		at Bradley	L 76–87	6–22 (2–14)	Renaissance Coliseum (991); Peoria, IL
Mar 3, 2019; 2:00 pm, ESPN+		at Illinois State	L 53–74	6–23 (2–15)	Redbird Arena (897); Normal, IL
Mar 9, 2019; 1:00 pm, ESPN+		Loyola–Chicago	W 81–74	7–23 (3–15)	Athletics–Recreation Center (359); Valparaiso, IN
MVC Tournament
Mar 14, 2019; 4:00 pm, ESPN+	(9)	vs. (8) Indiana State; First Round	W 77–55	8–23	TaxSlayer Center; Moline, IL
Mar 15, 2019; 12:00 pm, ESPN+	(9)	vs. (1) Drake; Quarterfinals	L 58–86	8–24	TaxSlayer Center; Moline, IL
*Non-conference game. ^{#}Rankings from AP Poll. (#) Tournament seedings in parentheses. All times are in Central Time.

== See also ==
2018–19 Valparaiso Crusaders men's basketball team
