= 2018–19 Bradley Braves women's basketball team =

Intercollegiate basketball season

2018–19 Bradley Braves women's basketball

FAU Thanksgiving Tournament champions
- Conference: Missouri Valley Conference
- Record: 20–10 (10–8 The Valley)
- Head coach: Andrea Gorski (3rd season)
- Assistant coaches: Paul Fessler; Christena Hamilton; Kristi Zeller
- Home arena: Renaissance Coliseum

2018–19 Missouri Valley Conference women's basketball standings
	Conf.				Overall
Team	W		L	PCT	W		L	PCT
Drake	17	–	1	.944	27	–	7	.794
Missouri State †	16	–	2	.889	25	–	10	.714
Northern Iowa	12	–	6	.667	20	–	13	.606
Illinois State	11	–	7	.611	19	–	12	.613
Bradley	10	–	8	.556	20	–	10	.667
Southern Illinois	8	–	10	.444	15	–	15	.500
Loyola–Chicago	6	–	12	.333	13	–	18	.419
Indiana State	5	–	13	.278	11	–	19	.367
Valparaiso	3	–	15	.167	8	–	24	.250
Evansville	2	–	16	.111	4	–	26	.133
† 2019 MVC tournament winner As of March 30, 2019; Rankings from AP poll

The 2018–19 Bradley Braves women's basketball team represented Bradley University during the 2018–19 NCAA Division I women's basketball season. The Braves were led by third-year head coach Andrea Gorski as members of the Missouri Valley Conference (MVC) and played their home games at Renaissance Coliseum in Peoria, Illinois. They finished the season 20–10, 10–8 in MVC play, to finish in fifth place. They lost in the quarterfinals of the Missouri Valley women's tournament to Illinois State. Despite having 20 wins and a better record, they were not invited to a postseason tournament.

== Roster ==
2018–19 Bradley Braves women's basketball team
Players
Coaches

Pos.	#	Name	Height	Year	Previous school	Hometown
G	3	Gabi Haack	5 ft 10 in (1.78 m)	So	Elk River	Elk River, MN
G	4	Aannah Interrante	5 ft 10 in (1.78 m)	Fr	McHenry West	Johnsburg, IL
F	5	Chelsea Brackmann	6 ft 1 in (1.85 m)	Jr	Eisenhower	New Berlin, WI
G	11	Lasha Petree	6 ft 0 in (1.83 m)	Fr	Arbor Prep	Detroit, MI
F	12	Asia Strong	6 ft 2 in (1.88 m)	Fr	Riley	South Bend, IN
G	13	Tatum Koenig	5 ft 7 in (1.7 m)	Fr	West Branch	West Branch, IA
G	14	Ryan Wilkins	5 ft 5 in (1.65 m)	Jr	St. Teresa's Academy	Kansas City, MO
G	23	Jailynn Lawson	5 ft 8 in (1.73 m)	So	Central	Peoria, IL
G	24	Shunseere Kent	5 ft 7 in (1.7 m)	Sr	Hapeville Charter Career Academy; East Georgia State	East Point, GA
G	25	Amber Bozeman	5 ft 9 in (1.75 m)	Jr	Dunlap	Dunlap, IL
F	30	Emily Marsh	6 ft 0 in (1.83 m)	So	Huron	Superior Township, MI
G/F	32	Ellie Spelhaug	5 ft 10 in (1.78 m)	Fr	Pleasant Valley	Bettendorf, IA
F	44	Vanessa Markert	6 ft 2 in (1.88 m)	Sr	Brown County	Mount Sterling, IL
F	45	Nyjah White	5 ft 11 in (1.8 m)	So	Hickman	Columbia, MO

Head coach

- Andrea Gorski (Bradley)

Assistant coach(es)

- Paul Fessler (Northern Iowa)
- Christena Hamilton (Temple)
- Kristi Zeller (Toledo)

Legend

- (C) Team captain
- (S) Suspended
- (I) Ineligible
- (W) Walk-on
- Injured
- Current redshirt

Roster
Last update: February 19, 2025

== Schedule ==
Date time, TV	Rank^{#}	Opponent^{#}	Result	Record	Site (attendance) city, state
Exhibition
November 3, 2018*; 2:30 p.m.		Quincy	W 91–62		Renaissance Coliseum (606); Peoria, IL
Non-conference regular season
November 10, 2018*; 7:00 p.m., ESPN3		Southeast Missouri State	W 85–79	1–0	Renaissance Coliseum (693); Peoria, IL
November 18, 2018*; 2:00 p.m., ESPN3		Rockhurst	W 83–40	2–0	Renaissance Coliseum (565); Peoria, IL
November 23, 2018*; 1:30 p.m.		vs. Delaware; FAU Thanksgiving Tournament semifinals	W 59–47	3–0	FAU Arena (472); Boca Raton, FL
November 24, 2018*; 11:00 a.m.		at Florida Atlantic; FAU Thanksgiving Tournament championship	W 80–59	4–0	FAU Arena (415); Boca Raton, FL
November 28, 2018*; 7:00 p.m., ESPN+		Eastern Illinois	W 67–64	5–0	Renaissance Coliseum (571); Peoria, IL
December 1, 2018*; 1:00 p.m., ESPN+		Oakland	W 73–64	6–0	Renaissance Coliseum (648); Peoria, IL
December 4, 2018*; 11:00 a.m., ESPN+		Western Illinois	W 82–68	7–0	Renaissance Coliseum (2,324); Peoria, IL
December 14, 2018*; 12:00 p.m.		at Omaha	W 80–60	8–0	Sapp Fieldhouse (1,503); Omaha, NE
December 19, 2018*; 4:00 p.m., ESPN3		at Cleveland State	W 67–65	9–0	Wolstein Center (203); Cleveland, OH
December 21, 2018*; 11:00 a.m.		at Purdue	L 61–74	9–1	Mackey Arena (5,491); West Lafayette, IN
December 28, 2018*; 7:00 p.m., ESPN+		Chicago State	W 89–59	10–1	Renaissance Coliseum (708); Peoria, IL
Missouri Valley Conference regular season
January 4, 2019; 7:00 p.m., ESPN+		Drake	L 63–92	10–2 (0–1)	Renaissance Coliseum (737); Peoria, IL
January 6, 2019; 2:00 p.m., ESPN3		Northern Iowa	L 78–81 ^{OT}	10–3 (0–2)	Renaissance Coliseum (576); Peoria, IL
January 11, 2019; 6:00 p.m., ESPN+		at Evansville	W 75–68	11–3 (1–2)	Meeks Family Fieldhouse (323); Evansville, IN
January 13, 2019; 1:00 p.m., ESPN+		at Indiana State	W 61–45	12–3 (2–2)	Hulman Center (1,474); Terre Haute, IN
January 18, 2019; 7:00 p.m., ESPN3		Missouri State	L 56–68	12–4 (2–3)	Renaissance Coliseum (515); Peoria, IL
January 20, 2019; 2:00 p.m., ESPN+		Southern Illinois	W 58–53 ^{OT}	13–4 (3–3)	Renaissance Coliseum (656); Peoria, IL
January 26, 2019; 4:00 p.m., ESPN+		at Illinois State; I-74 Rivalry	W 79–68	14–4 (4–3)	Redbird Arena (1,223); Normal, IL
February 1, 2019; 7:00 p.m., ESPN+		at Valparaiso	L 73–76	14–5 (4–4)	Athletics–Recreation Center (377); Valparaiso, IN
February 3, 2019; 1:00 p.m., ESPN3		at Loyola Chicago	W 69–56	15–5 (5–4)	Joseph J. Gentile Center (378); Chicago, IL
February 8, 2019; 7:00 p.m., ESPN+		Indiana State	W 61–45	16–5 (6–4)	Renaissance Coliseum (683); Peoria, IL
February 10, 2019; 2:00 p.m., ESPN3		Evansville	W 81–63	17–5 (7–4)	Renaissance Coliseum (657); Peoria, IL
February 15, 2019; 6:00 p.m., ESPN+		at Southern Illinois	L 55–62	17–6 (7–5)	SIU Arena (356); Carbondale, IL
February 17, 2019; 2:00 p.m., ESPN+		at Missouri State	L 60–82	17–7 (7–6)	JQH Arena (2,235); Springfield, MO
February 22, 2019; 4:00 p.m., ESPN+		Illinois State; I-74 Rivalry	W 65–55	18–7 (8–6)	Renaissance Coliseum (993); Peoria, IL
February 28, 2019; 7:00 p.m., ESPN+		Valparaiso	W 87–76	19–7 (9–6)	Renaissance Coliseum (991); Peoria, IL
March 3, 2019; 2:00 p.m., ESPN3		Loyola Chicago	W 71–59	20–7 (10–6)	Renaissance Coliseum (1,024); Peoria, IL
March 7, 2019; 7:00 p.m., ESPN+		at Northern Iowa	L 57–61	20–8 (10–7)	McLeod Center (1,652); Cedar Falls, IA
March 9, 2019; 2:00 p.m., ESPN+		at No. 23 Drake	L 53–95	20–9 (10–8)	Knapp Center (3,257); Des Moines, IA
Missouri Valley women's tournament
March 15, 2019; 2:30 p.m., ESPN+	(5)	vs. (4) Illinois State; Quarterfinals	L 55–61	20–10	TaxSlayer Center (1,509); Moline, IL
*Non-conference game. ^{#}Rankings from AP poll. (#) Tournament seedings in parentheses. All times are in Central.

== See also ==
- 2018–19 Bradley Braves men's basketball team
