= 2018–19 Evansville Purple Aces women's basketball team =

Intercollegiate basketball season

2018–19 Evansville Purple Aces women's basketball
- Conference: Missouri Valley Conference
- Record: 4–26 (2–16 The Valley)
- Head coach: Matt Ruffing (3rd season)
- Assistant coaches: Doug Rogers; Jauwan Scaife; Karyla Middlebrook
- Home arena: Meeks Family Fieldhouse

2018–19 Missouri Valley Conference women's basketball standings
	Conf.				Overall
Team	W		L	PCT	W		L	PCT
Drake	17	–	1	.944	27	–	7	.794
Missouri State †	16	–	2	.889	25	–	10	.714
Northern Iowa	12	–	6	.667	20	–	13	.606
Illinois State	11	–	7	.611	19	–	12	.613
Bradley	10	–	8	.556	20	–	10	.667
Southern Illinois	8	–	10	.444	15	–	15	.500
Loyola–Chicago	6	–	12	.333	13	–	18	.419
Indiana State	5	–	13	.278	11	–	19	.367
Valparaiso	3	–	15	.167	8	–	24	.250
Evansville	2	–	16	.111	4	–	26	.133
† 2019 MVC tournament winner As of March 30, 2019; Rankings from AP poll

The 2018–19 Evansville Purple Aces women's basketball team represented the University of Evansville during the 2018–19 NCAA Division I women's basketball season. The Purple Aces, led by third-year head coach Matt Ruffing, played their home games at Meeks Family Fieldhouse in Evansville, Indiana and were members of the Missouri Valley Conference (MVC). They finished the season 4–26, 2–16 in MVC play, to finish in last place. They lost in the first round of the Missouri Valley women's tournament to Loyola–Chicago.

== Roster ==
2018–19 Evansville Purple Aces women's basketball team
Players
Coaches

Pos.	#	Name	Height	Year	Previous school	Hometown
G	1	Anna Newman	5 ft 4 in (1.63 m)	Fr	Evansville North	Evansville, IN
F	2	Kerri Gasper	5 ft 11 in (1.8 m)	Sr	Olmstead Falls	Olmsted Township, OH
G	3	Marley Miller	5 ft 7 in (1.7 m)	RS Jr	East Richland; Vincennes University	Olney, IL
G	4	Makayla Wallace	5 ft 4 in (1.63 m)	Fr	Kirkwood	Kirkwood, MO
F	5	Jada Poland (redshirt)	5 ft 11 in (1.8 m)	Jr	Fort Zumwalt; North Texas	St. Louis, MO
G	11	Brooke Dossett	5 ft 6 in (1.68 m)	RS Sr	Gallatin; Vincennes University	Warsaw, KY
G	12	Sydney Turker	5 ft 8 in (1.73 m)	Fr	Frankton	Frankton, IN
G	15	Sydne Caddy	5 ft 10 in (1.78 m)	Fr	Fernandia Beach	Fernandina Beach, FL
G	21	A'Niah Griffin	6 ft 1 in (1.85 m)	Fr	DuPont Manual	Louisville, KY
F	31	Tattenai Hall	6 ft 0 in (1.83 m)	Sr	Heritage	Fort Wayne, IN
G	32	Kayla Casteel	5 ft 9 in (1.75 m)	So	Plainfield	Indianapolis, IN
C	42	Kaylan Coffman	6 ft 3 in (1.91 m)	Jr	Benton Central	Templeton, IN
G		Lola Bracy (redshirt)	5 ft 7 in (1.7 m)	So	Kirkwood; Lamar	St. Louis, MO
F		NaTaya Partee (redshirt)	6 ft 2 in (1.88 m)	So	Grandview; Johnson City CC	St. Louis, MO

Head coach

- Matt Ruffing (Dayton)

Assistant coach(es)

- Doug Rogers (Wisconsin)
- Jauwan Scaife (Ball State)
- Karyla Middlebrook (Kansas State)

Legend

- (C) Team captain
- (S) Suspended
- (I) Ineligible
- (W) Walk-on
- Injured
- Current redshirt

Roster
Last update: February 21, 2025

== Schedule ==
Date time, TV	Rank^{#}	Opponent^{#}	Result	Record	Site (attendance) city, state
Exhibition
October 28, 2018*; 1:00 p.m.		Kentucky Wesleyan	W 81–80		Meeks Family Fieldhouse (372); Evansville, IN
Non-conference regular season
November 7, 2018*; 6:00 p.m., ESPN+		at Murray State	L 53–81	0–1	CFSB Center (585); Murray, KY
November 10, 2018*; 2:00 p.m.		at Chicago State	W 67–58	1–1	Jones Convocation Center (350); Chicago, IL
November 14, 2018*; 6:00 p.m., ESPN+		SIU Edwardsville	L 45–54	1–2	Meeks Family Fieldhouse (367); Evansville, IN
November 20, 2018*; 6:00 p.m., ESPN+		Purdue Fort Wayne	L 66–72	1–3	Meeks Family Fieldhouse (294); Evansville, IN
November 29, 2018*; 5:00 p.m.		at Marshall	L 65–72 ^{OT}	1–4	Cam Henderson Center (638); Huntington, WV
December 2, 2018*; 1:05 p.m., ESPN+		at Morehead State	L 63–85	1–5	Ellis Johnson Arena (910); Morehead, KY
December 5, 2018*; 6:00 p.m., ESPN3		UIC	L 54–62	1–6	Meeks Family Fieldhouse (287); Evansville, IN
December 8, 2018*; 1:00 p.m., ESPN+		Southeast Missouri State	L 50–54	1–7	Meeks Family Fieldhouse (307); Evansville, IN
December 15, 2018*; 6:00 p.m., ESPN+		at Dayton	L 30–69	1–8	UD Arena (1,706); Dayton, OH
December 18, 2018*; 6:00 p.m., ESPN3		Austin Peay	W 56–52	2–8	Meeks Family Fieldhouse (211); Evansville, IN
December 21, 2018*; 7:00 p.m.		at Wisconsin	L 60–96	2–9	Kohl Center (3,980); Madison, WI
Missouri Valley regular season
January 4, 2019; 6:00 p.m., ESPN+		at Southern Illinois	L 47–67	2–10 (0–1)	SIU Arena (503); Carbondale, IL
January 6, 2019; 2:00 p.m., ESPN3		at Missouri State	L 66–88	2–11 (0–2)	JQH Arena (1,934); Springfield, MO
January 11, 2019; 2:00 p.m., ESPN+		Bradley	L 68–75	2–12 (0–3)	Meeks Family Fieldhouse (323); Evansville, IN
January 13, 2019; 2:00 p.m., ESPN+		Illinois State	L 61–72	2–13 (0–4)	Meeks Family Fieldhouse (282); Evansville, IN
January 18, 2019; 3:00 p.m., ESPN+		at Loyola–Chicago	L 56–61	2–14 (0–5)	Joseph J. Gentile Arena (214); Chicago, IL
January 20, 2019; 1:00 p.m., ESPN+		at Valparaiso	L 49–93	2–15 (0–6)	Athletics–Recreation Center (214); Valparaiso, IN
January 25, 2019; 6:00 p.m., ESPN+		Northern Iowa	L 46–74	2–16 (0–7)	Meeks Family Fieldhouse (253); Evansville, IN
January 27, 2019; 1:00 p.m., ESPN3		Drake	L 47–78	2–17 (0–8)	Meeks Family Fieldhouse (233); Evansville, IN
February 1, 2019; 1:00 p.m., ESPN+		Indiana State	L 69–76	2–18 (0–9)	Meeks Family Fieldhouse (389); Evansville, IN
February 8, 2019; 7:00 p.m., ESPN+		at Illinois State	L 59–82	2–19 (0–10)	Redbird Arena (416); Normal, IL
February 10, 2019; 2:00 p.m., ESPN3		at Bradley	L 63–81	2–20 (0–11)	Renaissance Coliseum (657); Peoria, IL
February 15, 2019; 6:00 p.m., ESPN+		Valparaiso	W 77–65	3–20 (1–11)	Meeks Family Fieldhouse (334); Evansville, IN
February 17, 2019; 11:00 a.m., ESPN+		Loyola–Chicago	L 51–71	3–21 (1–12)	Meeks Family Fieldhouse (289); Evansville, IN
February 22, 2019; 6:00 p.m., ESPN+		at No. 24 Drake	L 39–66	3–22 (1–13)	Knapp Center (233); Des Moines, IA
February 24, 2019; 2:00 p.m., ESPN+		at Northern Iowa	L 46–95	3–23 (1–14)	McLeod Center (1,012); Cedar Falls, IA
March 1, 2019; 6:00 p.m., ESPN+		at Indiana State	W 59–56	4–23 (2–14)	Hulman Center (1,505); Terre Haute, IN
March 7, 2019; 6:00 p.m., ESPN+		Missouri State	L 46–88	4–24 (2–15)	Meeks Family Fieldhouse (301); Evansville, IN
March 9, 2019; 1:00 p.m., ESPN+		Southern Illinois	L 60–80	4–25 (2–16)	Meeks Family Fieldhouse (307); Evansville, IN
Missouri Valley women's tournament
March 14, 2019; 7:00 p.m., ESPN+	(10)	vs. (7) Loyola–Chicago; First round	L 80–90	4–26	TaxSlayer Center (905); Moline, IL
*Non-conference game. ^{#}Rankings from AP poll. (#) Tournament seedings in parentheses. All times are in Central.

== See also ==
- 2018–19 Evansville Purple Aces men's basketball team
