= 2018–19 Illinois State Redbirds women's basketball team =

Intercollegiate basketball season

2018–19 Illinois State Redbirds women's basketball
- Conference: Missouri Valley Conference
- Record: 19–12 (11–7 The Valley)
- Head coach: Kristen Gillespie (2nd season)
- Assistant coaches: Jessica Keller; Scott Gillespie; Mariyah Brawner-Henley
- Home arena: Redbird Arena

2018–19 Missouri Valley Conference women's basketball standings
	Conf.				Overall
Team	W		L	PCT	W		L	PCT
Drake	17	–	1	.944	27	–	7	.794
Missouri State †	16	–	2	.889	25	–	10	.714
Northern Iowa	12	–	6	.667	20	–	13	.606
Illinois State	11	–	7	.611	19	–	12	.613
Bradley	10	–	8	.556	20	–	10	.667
Southern Illinois	8	–	10	.444	15	–	15	.500
Loyola–Chicago	6	–	12	.333	13	–	18	.419
Indiana State	5	–	13	.278	11	–	19	.367
Valparaiso	3	–	15	.167	8	–	24	.250
Evansville	2	–	16	.111	4	–	26	.133
† 2019 MVC tournament winner As of March 30, 2019; Rankings from AP poll

The 2018–19 Illinois State Redbirds women's basketball team represented Illinois State University during the 2018–19 NCAA Division I women's basketball season. The Redbirds, led by second-year head coach Kristen Gillespie, played their home games at Redbird Arena and were members of the Missouri Valley Conference. They finished the season 19–12, 11–7 in MVC play to finish in fourth place. They advanced to the semifinals of the Missouri Valley women's tournament, where they lost to Drake. Despite having 19 wins, they were not invited to a postseason tournament.

== Roster ==
2018–19 Illinois State Redbirds women's basketball team
Players
Coaches

Pos.	#	Name	Height	Year	Previous school	Hometown
G	3	Mary Crompton	5 ft 8 in (1.73 m)	Fr	Iowa City Regina	Iowa City, IA
F	5	Lexy Koudelka	6 ft 1 in (1.85 m)	Fr	Nevada	Nevada, IA
G	11	TeTe Maggett	5 ft 8 in (1.73 m)	Jr	Zion-Benton; Vincennes	North Chicago, IL
G	13	Katrina Beck	5 ft 9 in (1.75 m)	Sr	Whitney Young	Chicago, IL
G	14	Paige Saylor	5 ft 5 in (1.65 m)	So	Roncalli	Martinsville, IN
G	15	Frannie Corrigan	5 ft 11 in (1.8 m)	Jr	Lyons Township	LaGrange, IL
G	21	Ally Gietzel	5 ft 10 in (1.78 m)	Fr	Fon du Lac	Fond du Lac, WI
G	23	Viria Livingston	5 ft 8 in (1.73 m)	Sr	Hopkins	Minnetonka, MN
F	24	Megan Talbot	6 ft 2 in (1.88 m)	Jr	Barrington	Barrington, IL
F	25	Lexi Wallen	6 ft 0 in (1.83 m)	Sr	St. Thomas Moore	Champaign, IL
G	31	Kayel Wallen	6 ft 0 in (1.83 m)	Fr	Liberty	Kansas City, MO
F	32	Simone Goods	6 ft 2 in (1.88 m)	Sr	Benson HS; Kirkwood CC	Omaha, NE

Head coach

- Kristen Gillespie (NC State)

Assistant coach(es)

- Jessica Keller (Quincy)
- Scott Gillespie (Ripon)
- Mariyah Brawner-Henley (Lewis)

Legend

- (C) Team captain
- (S) Suspended
- (I) Ineligible
- (W) Walk-on
- Injured
- Current redshirt

Roster

== Schedule ==
Date time, TV	Rank^{#}	Opponent^{#}	Result	Record	Site (attendance) city, state
Exhibition
Nov 4, 2018*; 1:00 pm		Quincy	W 82–55		Redbird Arena (550); Normal, IL
Non-conference regular season
Nov 11, 2018*; 2:00 pm, ESPN+		at SIU Edwardsville	L 61–68	0–1	Vadalabene Center (929); Edwardsville, IL
Nov 14, 2018*; 7:00 pm, ESPN+		North Dakota	W 67–55	1–1	Redbird Arena (507); Normal, IL
Nov 17, 2018*; 11:00 am, ESPN3		at Eastern Michigan	L 41–50	1–2	Convocation Center (1,036); Ypsilanti, MI
Nov 19, 2018*; 6:00 pm, ESPN3		at Cleveland State	L 63–67	1–3	Wolstein Center (132); Cleveland, OH
Nov 25, 2018*; 1:00 pm		at Butler	L 56–58	1–4	Hinkle Fieldhouse (611); Indianapolis, IN
Nov 29, 2018*; 7:00 pm, ESPN3		Oakland	W 62–56	2–4	Redbird Arena (564); Normal, IL
Dec 4, 2018*; 7:00 pm, ESPN+		Austin Peay	W 61–49	3–4	Redbird Arena (547); Normal, IL
Dec 7, 2018*; 6:00 pm, ESPN3		at Northern Kentucky	W 58–53	4–4	BB&T Arena (1,013); Highland Heights, KY
Dec 16, 2018*; 3:30 pm, ESPN+		Maryville	W 61–52	5–4	Redbird Arena (545); Normal, IL
Dec 20, 2018*; 11:00 am, ESPN3		Saint Louis	W 72–67	6–4	Redbird Arena (3,500); Normal, IL
Dec 30, 2018*; 2:00 pm		at UMKC	W 62–55	7–4	Swinney Recreation Center (713); Kansas City, MO
Missouri Valley regular season
Jan 4, 2019; 7:00 pm, ESPN+		Northern Iowa	W 66–64	8–4 (1–0)	Redbird Arena (725); Normal, IL
Jan 6, 2019; 2:00 pm, ESPN+		Drake	L 64–82	8–5 (1–1)	Redbird Arena (592); Normal, IL
Jan 11, 2019; 6:00 pm, ESPN+		at Indiana State	L 44–59	8–6 (1–2)	Hulman Center (1,582); Terre Haute, IN
Jan 13, 2019; 1:00 pm, ESPN+		at Evansville	W 72–61	9–6 (2–2)	Meeks Family Fieldhouse (282); Evansville, IN
Jan 18, 2019; 7:00 pm, ESPN+		Southern Illinois	W 60–52	10–6 (3–2)	Redbird Arena (631); Normal, IL
Jan 20, 2019; 2:00 pm, ESPN3		Missouri State	L 47–59	10–7 (3–3)	Redbird Arena (782); Normal, IL
Jan 26, 2019; 4:00 pm, ESPN+		Bradley; I-74 Rivalry	L 68–79	10–8 (3–4)	Redbird Arena (1,223); Normal, IL
Feb 1, 2019; 7:00 pm, ESPN+		at Loyola–Chicago	L 59–62	10–9 (3–5)	Joseph J. Gentile Arena (482); Chicago, IL
Feb 3, 2019; 1:00 pm, ESPN+		at Valparaiso	W 70–67	11–9 (4–5)	Athletics–Recreation Center (355); Valparaiso, IN
Feb 8, 2019; 7:00 pm, ESPN+		Evansville	W 82–59	12–9 (5–5)	Redbird Arena (416); Normal, IL
Feb 10, 2019; 2:00 pm, ESPN+		Indiana State	W 78–70	13–9 (6–5)	Redbird Arena (1,184); Normal, IL
Feb 15, 2019; 7:00 pm, ESPN+		at Missouri State	W 60–56	14–9 (7–5)	JQH Arena (1,750); Springfield, MO
Feb 17, 2019; 2:00 pm, ESPN+		at Southern Illinois	W 68–66	15–9 (8–5)	SIU Arena (446); Carbondale, IL
Feb 22, 2019; 7:00 pm, ESPN3		at Bradley; I-74 Rivalry	L 65–75	15–10 (8–6)	Renaissance Coliseum (993); Peoria, IL
Feb 28, 2019; 7:30 pm, ESPN+		Loyola–Chicago	W 65–52	16–10 (9–6)	Redbird Arena (497); Normal, IL
Feb 3, 2019; 1:00 pm, ESPN+		Valparaiso	W 74–53	17–10 (10–6)	Redbird Arena (897); Normal, IL
Mar 7, 2019; 6:00 pm, ESPN+		at No. 23 Drake	L 61–88	17–11 (10–7)	Knapp Center (3,555); Des Moines, IA
Mar 9, 2019; 2:00 pm, ESPN+		at Northern Iowa	W 54–53	18–11 (11–7)	McLeod Center (1,596); Cedar Falls, IA
Missouri Valley Women's Tournament
Mar 15, 2019; 2:30 pm, ESPN+	(4)	vs. (5) Bradley; Quarterfinals	W 61–55	19–11	TaxSlayer Center (1,509); Moline, IL
Mar 16, 2019; 1:30 pm, ESPN+	(4)	vs. (1) No. 21 Drake; Semifinals	L 54–65	19–12	TaxSlayer Center; Moline, IL
*Non-conference game. ^{#}Rankings from AP Poll. (#) Tournament seedings in parentheses. All times are in Central Time.

== See also ==
- 2018–19 Illinois State Redbirds men's basketball team
