= Irene Kerwin =

American baseball player (1925–2023)

- First base / Catcher
- Born: November 3, 1925; Peoria, Illinois, U.S.
- Died: November 29, 2023 (aged 98); Peoria, Illinois, U.S.
- Batted: Right Threw: Right

Teams
- Peoria Redwings (1949)

Career highlights and awards
- Women in Baseball – AAGPBL Permanent Display at the Baseball Hall of Fame and Museum (unveiled in 1988)

Helen Irene Kerwin (November 3, 1925 – November 29, 2023) was an All-American Girls Professional Baseball League player. Listed at 5' 7", 130 lb., she batted and threw right handed. She was dubbed 'Pepper' by her teammates.

== Background ==
Born in Peoria, Illinois, Irene Kerwin only played during one season in the All American League for her home team in 1949.

Kerwin started to play organized softball at some point between eighth grade and high school graduation. At age 14, she played for the Farrow Chix for a couple of years before working at Caterpillar and playing for its fast-pitch softball team in an industrial league.

During that time, a common practice was to recruit people to play for Caterpillar based on their athletic skill level and offer them employment. As a result, the Pekin Lettes softball team sponsored by Caterpillar was a huge success in Peoria, as they won several Illinois State Championships over the course of many seasons and entertained crowds, while averaging over 5,000 fans per game.

Kerwin died in Peoria on November 27, 2023, at the age of 98.

== All-American League ==
When Kerwin was 24, she was approached by an All American League scout after a tournament. She signed a contract in 1949 that led her hometown team, the Peoria Redwings. She was used sparingly as a backup catcher and at first base while appearing in 27 games with the Redwings, who finished last in the eight-team league.

Kerwin hit .173 (10-for-73) with two runs scored and one RBI while stealing one base. At the field, she recorded 166 putouts with seven assists and turned six double plays, while committing six errors in 179 total chances for a combined .966 fielding average.

The Redwings offered Kerwin another contract for the next year, but she realized the team did not have much future and might fold due to low attendance, and she needed to pay for college studies. She then rejected the offer and signed a contract to play in the National Girls Baseball League of Chicago for four years instead. At the same time, Kerwin enrolled at Illinois State University and the Peoria team folded a short time after.

Therefore, Kerwin played basketball during her four years at Illinois and led her team in scoring every year, while playing also for the volleyball and field hockey squads. She received her degree in 1953 and played a few more years of softball for the Caterpillar Pekin Lettes.

Kerwin played a total of 31 softball seasons, spending time at every position except pitcher. She also served as a player-coach for the Lettes, was a member of two Illinois basketball champions, and played in three national Amateur Athletic Union tournaments. In between, she also starred in basketball for four seasons at Peoria Academy of Our Lady High School, then was high scorer for the Lettes basketball squad from 1942 through 1947. Additionally, she won 75 Senior Olympics gold medals in 20 sports, including at least one gold in every sport. Besides, she holds 13 single-season and career records for the Lettes softball team.

== Coaching and Retirement ==
From there, she went on to teaching physical education at elementary schools for 30 years and coached two unbeaten teams at Oak Grove School in Bartonville, before retiring in 1983.

Kerwin earned inductions in the Indiana State University and the Illinois Amateur Softball Association Halls of Fame, and is also a member of the 1965 Pekin Lettes softball team enshrined in the Greather Peoria Sports Hall of Fame.

In 1988, Irene Kerwin received further recognition when she became part of Women in Baseball, a permanent display based at the Baseball Hall of Fame and Museum in Cooperstown, New York, which was unveiled to honor the entire All-American Girls Professional Baseball League rather than any individual figure.
