= 2018–19 Loyola Ramblers women's basketball team =

Intercollegiate basketball season

2018–19 Loyola Ramblers women's basketball
- Conference: Missouri Valley Conference
- Record: 13–18 (6–12 The Valley)
- Head coach: Kate Achter (3rd season)
- Assistant coaches: Maria Noucas; Michael Scruggs; Bianca Smith
- Home arena: Joseph J. Gentile Arena

2018–19 Missouri Valley Conference women's basketball standings
	Conf.				Overall
Team	W		L	PCT	W		L	PCT
Drake	17	–	1	.944	27	–	7	.794
Missouri State †	16	–	2	.889	25	–	10	.714
Northern Iowa	12	–	6	.667	20	–	13	.606
Illinois State	11	–	7	.611	19	–	12	.613
Bradley	10	–	8	.556	20	–	10	.667
Southern Illinois	8	–	10	.444	15	–	15	.500
Loyola–Chicago	6	–	12	.333	13	–	18	.419
Indiana State	5	–	13	.278	11	–	19	.367
Valparaiso	3	–	15	.167	8	–	24	.250
Evansville	2	–	16	.111	4	–	26	.133
† 2019 MVC tournament winner As of March 30, 2019; Rankings from AP poll

The 2018–19 Loyola Ramblers women's basketball team represented Loyola University Chicago during the 2018–19 NCAA Division I women's basketball season. The Ramblers, led by third year head coach Kate Achter, played their home games at the Joseph J. Gentile Arena and were members of the Missouri Valley Conference. They finished the season 13–18, 6–12 in MVC play to finish in seventh place. They advanced to the quarterfinals of the Missouri Valley women's tournament, where they lost to Missouri State.

== Roster ==
2018–19 Loyola Ramblers women's basketball team
Players
Coaches

Pos.	#	Name	Height	Year	Previous school	Hometown
G	2	Ellie Rice	5 ft 10 in (1.78 m)	So	Regents School of Austin	Austin, TX
G/F	3	Alexis Meyer	5 ft 11 in (1.8 m)	So	Westview	Portland, OR
G/F	4	Abby O'Connor	6 ft 0 in (1.83 m)	So	St. Joseph	South Bend, IN
G	5	Tiara Wallace	5 ft 6 in (1.68 m)	Jr	Montini Catholic	Berkeley, IL
G	11	Janae Gonzales	5 ft 8 in (1.73 m)	Fr	Sierra Linda	Tolleson, AZ
G/F	12	Citiana Negatu	5 ft 9 in (1.75 m)	Sr	Blake	Silver Spring, MD
G	20	Kailyn Strawbridge	5 ft 7 in (1.7 m)	So	Rockford Lutheran	Rockford, IL
F	21	Allison Day	6 ft 1 in (1.85 m)	Fr	Eastern	Winchester, OH
G	23	Jazmine Covington	5 ft 9 in (1.75 m)	Jr	Thunderbird; Phoenix College	Phoenix, AZ
G/F	24	Maya Dunson	5 ft 11 in (1.8 m)	Fr	Wayne	Dayton, OH
F/C	32	Kat Nolan	6 ft 1 in (1.85 m)	So	Rolling Meadows	Arlington Heights, IL

Head coach

- Kate Achter (Bowling Green)

Assistant coach(es)

- Maria Noucas (Bowdoin)
- Michael Scruggs (Tennessee)
- Bianca Smith (Colorado)

Legend

- (C) Team captain
- (S) Suspended
- (I) Ineligible
- (W) Walk-on
- Injured
- Current redshirt

Roster

== Schedule ==
Date time, TV	Rank^{#}	Opponent^{#}	Result	Record	Site (attendance) city, state
Exhibition
Nov 3, 2018*; 1:00 pm		North Central College	W 73–49		Joseph J. Gentile Arena; Chicago, IL
Non-conference regular season
Nov 9, 2018*; 6:00 pm, ESPN+		at Youngstown State	L 63–74	0–1	Beeghly Center (1,216); Youngstown, OH
Nov 12, 2018*; 7:00 pm, ESPN+		Detroit Mercy	W 52–43	1–1	Joseph J. Gentile Arena (301); Chicago, IL
Nov 12, 2018*; 3:12 pm, ESPN3		at UIC	W 75–60	2–1	Credit Union 1 Arena (555); Chicago, IL
Nov 20, 2018*; 10:00 am, ESPN+		at Bowling Green	L 74–88	2–2	Stroh Center (4,144); Bowling Green, OH
Nov 26, 2018*; 7:00 pm, ESPN+		Chicago State	W 76–40	3–2	Joseph J. Gentile Arena (309); Chicago, IL
Nov 29, 2018*; 11:00 am, ESPN3		Purdue Fort Wayne	W 81–67	4–2	Joseph J. Gentile Arena (1,203); Chicago, IL
Dec 3, 2018*; 6:00 pm, ESPN+		at Western Michigan	W 64–53	5–2	University Arena (462); Kalamazoo, MI
Dec 6, 2018*; 7:00 pm, ESPN3		SIU Edwardsville	W 56–43	6–2	Joseph J. Gentile Arena (341); Chicago, IL
Dec 9, 2018*; 6:00 pm		at Purdue	L 41–65	6–3	Mackey Arena (6,047); West Lafayette, IN
Dec 16, 2018*; 12:00 pm, ESPN+		UMKC	L 74–88	6–4	Joseph J. Gentile Arena (3,412); Chicago, IL
Dec 20, 2018*; 7:00 pm, ESPN3		No. 20 DePaul	L 76–102	6–5	Joseph J. Gentile Arena (324); Chicago, IL
Missouri Valley regular season
Jan 6, 2019; 1:00 pm, ESPN3		Valparaiso	W 80–54	7–5 (1–0)	Joseph J. Gentile Arena (212); Chicago, IL
Jan 11, 2019; 6:00 pm, ESPN+		at Drake	L 60–69	7–6 (1–1)	Knapp Center (2,786); Des Moines, IA
Jan 13, 2019; 11:30 am, ESPN+		at Northern Iowa	L 52–64	7–7 (1–2)	McLeod Center (1,364); Cedar Falls, IA
Jan 18, 2019; 3:00 pm, ESPN+		Evansville	W 61–56	8–7 (2–2)	Joseph J. Gentile Arena (214); Chicago, IL
Jan 20, 2019; 1:00 pm, ESPN3		Indiana State	W 56–54	9–7 (3–2)	Joseph J. Gentile Arena (614); Chicago, IL
Jan 25, 2019; 7:00 pm, ESPN+		at Missouri State	L 49–84	9–8 (3–3)	JQH Arena (2,757); Springfield, MO
Jan 27, 2019; 2:00 pm, ESPN+		at Southern Illinois	L 63–74	9–9 (3–4)	SIU Arena (368); Carbondale, IL
Feb 1, 2019; 7:00 pm, ESPN+		Illinois State	W 62–59	10–9 (4–4)	Joseph J. Gentile Arena (482); Chicago, IL
Feb 3, 2019; 1:00 pm, ESPN+		Bradley	L 56–69	10–10 (4–5)	Joseph J. Gentile Arena (378); Chicago, IL
Feb 8, 2019; 11:30 am, ESPN3		Northern Iowa	L 65–71	10–11 (4–6)	Joseph J. Gentile Arena (503); Chicago, IL
Feb 10, 2019; 1:00 pm, ESPN+		Drake	L 55–83	10–12 (4–7)	Joseph J. Gentile Arena (264); Chicago, IL
Feb 15, 2019; 6:00 pm, ESPN+		at Indiana State	W 44–36	11–12 (5–7)	Hulman Center (1,790); Terre Haute, IN
Feb 17, 2019; 11:00 am		at Evansville	W 71–51	12–12 (6–7)	Meeks Family Fieldhouse (289); Evansville, IN
Feb 22, 2019; 7:00 pm, ESPN+		Southern Illinois	L 41–64	12–13 (6–8)	Joseph J. Gentile Arena (367); Chicago, IL
Feb 24, 2019; 1:00 pm, ESPN+		Missouri State	L 58–85	12–14 (6–9)	Joseph J. Gentile Arena (372); Chicago, IL
Feb 28, 2019; 7:30 pm, ESPN+		at Illinois State	L 52–65	12–15 (6–10)	Redbird Arena (497); Normal, IL
Mar 3, 2019; 1:00 pm, ESPN3		at Bradley	L 59–71	12–16 (6–11)	Renaissance Coliseum (1,024); Peoria, IL
Mar 9, 2019; 1:00 pm, ESPN+		at Valparaiso	L 74–81	12–17 (6–12)	Athletics–Recreation Center (359); Valparaiso, IN
Missouri Valley Women's Tournament
Mar 14, 2019; 7:00 pm, ESPN+	(7)	vs. (10) Evansville; First Round	W 90–80	13–17	TaxSlayer Center (905); Moline, IL
Mar 15, 2019; 6:00 pm, ESPN+	(7)	vs. (2) Missouri State; Quarterfinals	L 50–59	13–18	TaxSlayer Center; Moline, IL
*Non-conference game. ^{#}Rankings from Coaches' Poll. (#) Tournament seedings in parentheses. All times are in Central Time.

== See also ==
2018–19 Loyola Ramblers men's basketball team
