= Pekin Lettes =

Fast-pitch softball team in Pekin, Illinois

The Pekin Lettes is a fast-pitch softball team in Pekin, Illinois, and is the oldest member-sanctioned Amateur Softball Association team in the United States.

== History ==
The Lettes were started in 1936 and were then called the "Caterpillar Girls" because the team was sponsored by and composed of women from Caterpillar Tractor Company in nearby East Peoria. Caterpillar sponsored the team from 1936 until 1955. They became the Caterpillar Dieselettes in 1940, the Sunnyland Lettes in 1956, and the Pekin Lettes in 1959. Chuck McCord managed the team from 1947 and brought the team to Pekin.

In the late 1950s and early 1960s the Lettes average attendance-per-season was over 100,000, with thousands of spectators attending each game. The 1963 season averaged over 5,000 fans per game, setting a national ASA attendance record of 122,000 for 21 home games. In 2005, the Pekin Lettes team was inducted into the ASA Hall of Fame.

== Field ==
The Lettes play home games at Pekin's Mineral Springs Park. The Pekin Park District renamed "Diamond 1", the historic playing field of the Lettes, "Lettes Field" in 2002.

== Records ==
- Illinois State Championships: 1940, 1942–1955, 1957, 1969, 1977–79, 1991
- ASA National Tournament: 1959 (7th place), 1960 (4th place), 1961 (4th place), 1965 (3rd place), 1966 (7th place), 1970 (5th place), 1971 (7th place)

== Legends ==
=== ASA Women's Fastpitch First Team All-Americans prior to 1990 ===
- Gloria Bonelli (1950)
- Marie Wadlow (1950)
- Carolyn Thome Hart (1950–1952, 1959) (aunt of Jim Thome)
- Shirley Coney (1950, 1951)
- Sunne Bea Thomas (1960)
- Lorene Ramsey (1960, 1965)
- Ann Mullins (1965, 1970)
- Kelly Waldrup (1986)
- Wendy Smith (1986)
- Leanne Bonifas (1987)
- Linda Wells (1988)
- Margie Wright (1988)

=== Other notable players ===
- Lucille Sidney Eslinger
- Irene "Pepper" Kerwin
- Marian "Gabby" Kneer
- Dot Maple
- Eleanor “Rudy” Rudolph
- Sunne Bea Thomas
- Juanita “Lefty” Zutt

== Legacy ==
On June 25, 2008, Pekin mayor Dave Tebben named it "Pekin Lettes Day" for 50 continuous years of softball. A five-day celebration included the current Lettes team versus former players at Lettes Field in Mineral Springs Park.

The Caterpillar Visitors Center hosted a public exhibit from April to October 2015, featuring artifacts such as a signed softball from the 1946 state championship, team jacket and uniform, team pictures, and other mementos.

== Sources ==
- Peoria Journal Star
- Pekin Lettes homepage
