= Christelle N'Garsanet =

Ivorian basketball player (born 1983)

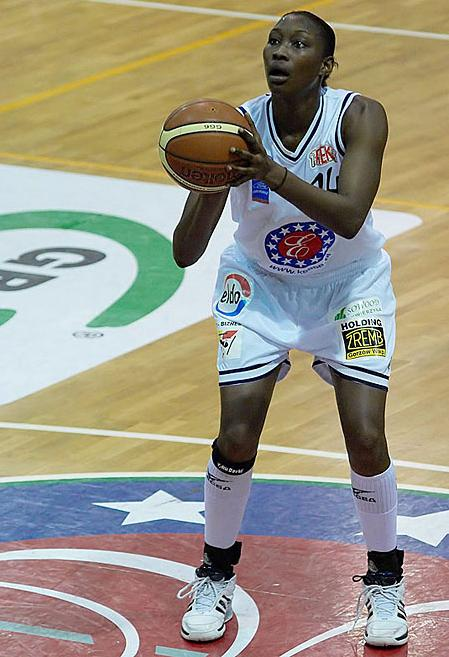

FIU Panthers
- Title: Assistant coach
- League: Conference USA

Personal information
- Born: June 23, 1983 (age 43) Abidjan, Ivory Coast
- Listed height: 1.91 m (6 ft 3 in)
- Listed weight: 76 kg (168 lb)

Career information
- College: Illinois Central (2002–2003); Missouri (2003–2006)
- WNBA draft: 2006: 3rd round, 37th overall pick
- Drafted by: New York Liberty
- Position: Center
- Coaching career: 2012–present

Career history

Playing
- 2006: New York Liberty
- 2007–2010: AZS Gorzow

Coaching
- 2012–2014: Illinois Central (asst.)
- 2014–2021: Southern Illinois (asst.)
- 2021–present: FIU (asst.)
- Stats at Basketball Reference

Christelle N'Garsanet (born June 23, 1983) is an Ivorian female professional basketball player.

== Missouri statistics ==
Legend
GP	Games played	GS	Games started	MPG	Minutes per game
FG%	Field goal percentage	3P%	3-point field goal percentage	FT%	Free throw percentage
RPG	Rebounds per game	APG	Assists per game	SPG	Steals per game
BPG	Blocks per game	PPG	Points per game	**Bold**	Career high

Year	Team	GP	Points	FG%	3P%	FT%	RPG	APG	SPG	BPG	PPG
2002–03	Illinois Central	Not found									
2003–04	Missouri	28	101	45.3%	0.0%	46.0%	2.9	0.4	0.6	0.5	3.6
2004–05	Missouri	29	364	**46.5%**	0.0%	**47.9%**	6.5	1.8	**1.4**	**1.3**	12.6
2005–06	Missouri	**31**	**405**	44.8%	0.0%	44.8%	**8.6**	**2.2**	1.4	1.3	**13.1**
Career		88	870	45.6%	0.0%	46.2%	6.1	1.5	1.2	1.0	9.9
