= 2018–19 Indiana State Sycamores women's basketball team =

Intercollegiate basketball season

2018–19 Indiana State Sycamores women's basketball
- Conference: Missouri Valley Conference
- Record: 11–19 (5–13 The Valley)
- Head coach: Vicki Hall (1st season)
- Assistant coaches: Quacy Barnes-Timmons; Luke Scheidecker; Roman Tubner
- Home arena: Hulman Center

2018–19 Missouri Valley Conference women's basketball standings
	Conf.				Overall
Team	W		L	PCT	W		L	PCT
Drake	17	–	1	.944	27	–	7	.794
Missouri State †	16	–	2	.889	25	–	10	.714
Northern Iowa	12	–	6	.667	20	–	13	.606
Illinois State	11	–	7	.611	19	–	12	.613
Bradley	10	–	8	.556	20	–	10	.667
Southern Illinois	8	–	10	.444	15	–	15	.500
Loyola–Chicago	6	–	12	.333	13	–	18	.419
Indiana State	5	–	13	.278	11	–	19	.367
Valparaiso	3	–	15	.167	8	–	24	.250
Evansville	2	–	16	.111	4	–	26	.133
† 2019 MVC tournament winner As of March 30, 2019; Rankings from AP poll

The 2018–19 Indiana State Sycamores women's basketball team represented Indiana State University during the 2018–19 NCAA Division I women's basketball season. The Sycamores, led by first-year head coach Vicki Hall, played their home games at the Hulman Center in Terre Haute, Indiana and were members of the Missouri Valley Conference (MVC). They finished the season 11–19, 5–13 in MVC play, to finish in eighth place. They lost in the first round of the Missouri Valley Conference women's tournament to Valparaiso.

== Roster ==
2018–19 Indiana State Sycamores women's basketball team
Players
Coaches

Pos.	#	Name	Height	Year	Previous school	Hometown
G	1	Janara Flowers	5 ft 8 in (1.73 m)	Fr	Walled Lake Western	Southfield, MI
G	3	Ashli O'Neal	5 ft 5 in (1.65 m)	Jr	Wyoming	Wyoming, OH
G	5	Maeva Kitantou	5 ft 8 in (1.73 m)	Sr	Northeast CC	Orléans, France
G	10	Tamara Lee	5 ft 8 in (1.73 m)	RS Sr	Edmond Santa Fe HS; Wichita State	Edmond, OK
G	11	Krystal Rice	5 ft 8 in (1.73 m)	RS Fr	Flint Hamady	Flint, MI
G	13	Alexis Delgado	5 ft 7 in (1.7 m)	Sr	Tolleston Union; Phoenix College	Phoenix, AZ
G	14	Tierra Webb	5 ft 7 in (1.7 m)	Sr	Rich South	Richton Park, IL
C	21	Lynn Tamis	6 ft 3 in (1.91 m)	Fr	Johan Cruyff College	Amsterdam, Netherlands
F	23	Daijah Smith	5 ft 10 in (1.78 m)	Fr	Lighthouse College Prep Academy	Gary, IN
F	24	Kierra Isaiah	6 ft 0 in (1.83 m)	Sr	Hogan Preparatory Academy; Johnson County CC	Kansas City, MO
F	30	Regan Wentland	6 ft 1 in (1.85 m)	Sr	Center Grove	Greenwood, IN
F	33	Ty Battle	6 ft 1 in (1.85 m)	So	Oswego East	Plainfield, IL
F	34	AJ Thomas	5 ft 10 in (1.78 m)	So	North Central	Detroit, MI

Head coach

- Vicki Hall (Texas)

Assistant coach(es)

- Quacy Barnes-Timmons (Indiana)
- Luke Scheidecker (Southeast Missouri State)
- Roman Tubner (Centenary)

Legend

- (C) Team captain
- (S) Suspended
- (I) Ineligible
- (W) Walk-on
- Injured
- Current redshirt

Roster
Last update: October 22, 2024

== Schedule ==
Date time, TV	Rank^{#}	Opponent^{#}	Result	Record	Site (attendance) city, state
Non-conference regular season
November 6, 2018*; 6:00 p.m.		at Marshall	W 62–53	1–0	Cam Henderson Center (764); Huntington, WV
November 13, 2018*; 5:00 p.m.		at Saint Louis	W 60–56	2–0	Chaifetz Arena (437); St. Louis, MO
November 23, 2018*; 2:00 p.m.		at Grand Canyon; Thanksgiving Showdown	W 88–81 ^{2OT}	3–0	GCU Arena (352); Phoenix, AZ
November 24, 2018*; 2:00 p.m.		vs. UC Irvine; Thanksgiving Showdown	L 61–77	3–1	GCU Arena (167); Phoenix, AZ
November 29, 2018*; 7:30 p.m., ESPN+		at Southeast Missouri State	W 62–51	4–1	Show Me Center (443); Cape Girardeau, MO
December 3, 2018*; 7:00 p.m., ESPN3		IUPUI	L 59–64	4–2	Hulman Center (1,659); Terre Haute, IN
December 5, 2018*; 8:00 p.m.		at Illinois	L 57–75	4–3	State Farm Center (981); Champaign, IL
December 8, 2018*; 4:00 p.m., ESPN+		UIC	W 60–53	5–3	Hulman Center (1,242); Terre Haute, IN
December 17, 2018*; 7:00 p.m.		at Butler	L 49–72	5–4	Hinkle Fieldhouse (789); Indianapolis, IN
December 21, 2018*; 7:00 p.m., ESPN+		at Eastern Illinois	L 39–63	5–5	Lantz Arena (264); Charleston, IL
December 30, 2018*; 2:00 p.m., ESPN+		Davenport	W 79–43	6–5	Hulman Center (1,606); Terre Haute, IN
Missouri Valley Conference regular season
January 4, 2019; 8:00 p.m., ESPN+		at Missouri State	L 58–71	6–6 (0–1)	JQH Arena (2,015); Springfield, MO
January 6, 2019; 3:00 p.m., ESPN+		at Southern Illinois	W 61–58	7–6 (1–1)	SIU Arena (497); Carbondale, IL
January 11, 2019; 7:00 p.m., ESPN+		Illinois State	W 59–44	8–6 (2–1)	Hulman Center (1,582); Terre Haute, IN
January 13, 2019; 2:00 p.m., ESPN+		Bradley	L 45–61	8–7 (2–2)	Hulman Center (1,474); Terre Haute, IN
January 18, 2019; 8:00 p.m., ESPN+		at Valparaiso	W 86–82 ^{OT}	9–7 (3–2)	Athletics–Recreation Center (485); Valparaiso, IN
January 20, 2019; 2:00 p.m., ESPN3		at Loyola–Chicago	L 54–56	9–8 (3–3)	Joseph J. Gentile Arena (614); Chicago, IL
January 25, 2019; 7:00 p.m., ESPN3		Drake	L 68–70	9–9 (3–4)	Hulman Center (1,408); Terre Haute, IN
January 27, 2019; 2:00 p.m., ESPN+		Northern Iowa	L 51–71	9–10 (3–5)	Hulman Center (1,564); Terre Haute, IN
February 1, 2019; 2:00 p.m., ESPN+		at Evansville	W 76–69	10–10 (4–5)	Meeks Family Fieldhouse (389); Evansville, IN
February 8, 2019; 8:00 p.m., ESPN+		at Bradley	W 59–44	9–11 (3–6)	Renaissance Coliseum (683); Peoria, IL
February 10, 2019; 3:00 p.m., ESPN+		at Illinois State	L 70–78	9–12 (3–7)	Redbird Arena (1,184); Normal, IL
February 15, 2019; 7:00 p.m., ESPN+		Loyola–Chicago	L 36–44	9–13 (3–8)	Hulman Center (1,790); Terre Haute, IN
February 17, 2019; 2:00 p.m., ESPN+		Valparaiso	W 67–59	10–13 (4–8)	Hulman Center (1,490); Terre Haute, IN
February 22, 2019; 8:00 p.m., ESPN+		at Northern Iowa	L 63–71	10–14 (4–9)	McLeod Center (1,381); Cedar Falls, IA
February 24, 2019; 2:00 p.m., ESPN3		at No. 24 Drake	L 77–96	10–14 (4–9)	Knapp Center (2,878); Des Moines, IA
March 1, 2019; 7:00 p.m., ESPN+		Evansville	L 56–59	10–15 (4–10)	Hulman Center (1,505); Terre Haute, IN
March 7, 2019; 7:00 p.m., ESPN+		Southern Illinois	L 61–80	11–17 (5–12)	Hulman Center (1,440); Terre Haute, IN
March 9, 2019; 2:00 p.m., ESPN3		Missouri State	L 58–71	11–18 (5–13)	Hulman Center (1,456); Terre Haute, IN
Missouri Valley women's tournament
March 14, 2019; 5:00 p.m., ESPN+	(8)	vs. (9) Valparaiso; First round	L 55–77	11–19	TaxSlayer Center (905); Moline, IL
*Non-conference game. ^{#}Rankings from AP poll. (#) Tournament seedings in parentheses. All times are in Eastern.

== See also ==
- 2018–19 Indiana State Sycamores men's basketball team
