= Kate Achter =

American basketball player and coach

Current position
- Title: Head coach
- Team: Western Michigan
- Conference: Mid-American
- Record: 9–20 (.310)

Playing career
- 2004–2008: Bowling Green
- 2008–2009: Palaio Faliro B.C.

Coaching career (HC unless noted)
- 2010–2013: St. Bonaventure (assistant)
- 2013–2015: St. Bonaventure (associate HC)
- 2015–2016: Xavier (assistant)
- 2016–2022: Loyola (IL)
- 2022–2025: Detroit Mercy
- 2025–present: Western Michigan

Head coaching record
- Overall: 113–186 (.378)

Accomplishments and honors

Awards
- MAC Player of the Year (2008); First-team All-MAC (2008); MAC Tournament MVP (2005); MAC All-Freshman Team (2005)

Kate Achter is an American basketball coach and former player who is the current head coach of the Western Michigan Broncos women's basketball team.

== Early life and education ==
Achter was born in Oregon, Ohio in 1986. She attended Bowling Green where she basketball under coach for Curt Miller where she won four MAC Championships, appeared in three NCAA tournaments including a sweet 16 run in 2007. She earned a bachelor's degree in education in 2009 and a master's in 2010. She played one season professionally with Palaio Faliro B.C. in Greece

== Coaching career ==
=== Early coaching career ===
Achter started her coaching career at her alma mater, Bowling Green State University in 2009–10 as a graduate assistant for the women's basketball team. From 2010 to 2015, she spent five years as an assistant and associate head coach for the St. Bonaventure Bonnies women's basketball team.

=== Detroit Mercy ===
Achter was named the 14th head coach in University of Detroit Mercy program history on April 27, 2022. In her three seasons leading the Titans, Achter had a record of 37–56, including the program's first winning season since 2016–17.

=== Western Michigan ===
On March 28, 2025, Achter was named the seventh head coach in Western Michigan University program history.

== Head coaching record ==
Statistics overview
Season	Team	Overall	Conference	Standing	Postseason
Loyola (IL) (Missouri Valley Conference) (2016–2022)
2016–17	Loyola	2–28	1–17		10th
2017–18	Loyola	7–23	5–13	T-8th	
2018–19	Loyola	13–18	6–12	7th	
2019–20	Loyola	15–14	6–12	8th	
2020–21	Loyola	12–15	8–10	6th	
2021–22	Loyola	18–12	10–8	5th	
Loyola:		67–110 (.379)	36–72 (.333)		
Detroit Mercy (Horizon League) (2022–2025)
2022–23	Detroit Mercy	5–25	3–17	11th	
2023–24	Detroit Mercy	17–16	9–11	6th	
2024–25	Detroit Mercy	15–15	8–12	6th	
Detroit Mercy:		37–56 (.398)	20–40 (.333)		
Western Michigan (Mid-American Conference) (2025–present)
2025–26	Western Michigan	9–20	5–13	10th	
Western Michigan:		9–20 (.310)	5–13 (.278)		
Total:		113–186 (.378)			
National champion Postseason invitational champion Conference regular season champion Conference regular season and conference tournament champion Division regular season champion Division regular season and conference tournament champion Conference tournament champion
