= 2018–19 Drake Bulldogs women's basketball team =

Intercollegiate basketball season

2018–19 Drake Bulldogs women's basketball

MVC regular-season champions

NCAA tournament, first round
- Conference: Missouri Valley Conference
- Record: 27–7 (17–1 The Valley)
- Head coach: Jennie Baranczyk (7th season)
- Assistant coaches: Allison Pohlman; Nicci Hays Fort; Markisha Wright
- Home arena: Knapp Center

2018–19 Missouri Valley Conference women's basketball standings
	Conf.				Overall
Team	W		L	PCT	W		L	PCT
Drake	17	–	1	.944	27	–	7	.794
Missouri State †	16	–	2	.889	25	–	10	.714
Northern Iowa	12	–	6	.667	20	–	13	.606
Illinois State	11	–	7	.611	19	–	12	.613
Bradley	10	–	8	.556	20	–	10	.667
Southern Illinois	8	–	10	.444	15	–	15	.500
Loyola–Chicago	6	–	12	.333	13	–	18	.419
Indiana State	5	–	13	.278	11	–	19	.367
Valparaiso	3	–	15	.167	8	–	24	.250
Evansville	2	–	16	.111	4	–	26	.133
† 2019 MVC tournament winner As of March 30, 2019; Rankings from AP poll

The 2018–19 Drake Bulldogs women's basketball team represented Drake University during the 2018–19 NCAA Division I women's basketball season. The Bulldogs, led by seventh-year head coach Jennie Baranczyk, played their home games at Knapp Center and were members of the Missouri Valley Conference (MVC).

== Previous season ==
The Bulldogs finished the 2017–18 season 26–8, 18–0 in MVC play, to win the MVC regular-season championship. They defeated Valparaiso, Southern Illinois and Northern Iowa to become champions of the Missouri Valley women's tournament. They earned an automatic trip to the NCAA women's tournament where they lost to Texas A&M in the first round.

== Roster ==
2018–19 Drake Bulldogs women's basketball team
Players
Coaches

Pos.	#	Name	Height	Year	Previous school	Hometown
G	2	Maddie Monahan	5 ft 8 in (1.73 m)	So	Glencoe-Silver Lake	Silver Lake, MN
G	5	Becca Hittner	6 ft 0 in (1.83 m)	Jr	Dowling Catholic	Urbandale, IA
G	11	Kierra Collier (redshirt)	5 ft 6 in (1.68 m)	So	Truman; Washington	Kansas City, MO
G/F	12	Brenni Rose	6 ft 0 in (1.83 m)	Jr	Shawnee Mission Northwest	Shawnee, KS
F	15	Allie Wooldridge	6 ft 1 in (1.85 m)	Fr	Center Point-Urbana	Center Point, IA
G	20	Maddy Dean	5 ft 9 in (1.75 m)	RS Sr	Jordan	Jordan, MN
G	21	Sammie Bachrodt	5 ft 10 in (1.78 m)	Sr	Kapaun Mt. Carmel	Wichita, KS
G	22	Hannah Fuller	5 ft 8 in (1.73 m)	So	Valley	West Des Moines, IA
G	23	Maggie Negaard	5 ft 10 in (1.78 m)	Fr	Stevens Point	Stevens Point, WI
G	24	Nicole Miller	5 ft 9 in (1.75 m)	Sr	North Linn	Walker, IA
G	30	Katie Van Scyoc	6 ft 1 in (1.85 m)	So	Lourdes Academy	Green Lake, WI
F	31	Monica Burich	6 ft 2 in (1.88 m)	RS Jr	Roseville; Colorado	Roseville, MN
F/C	35	Becca Jonas	6 ft 2 in (1.88 m)	RS Sr	Truman	Independence, MO
F/C	40	Mya Mertz	6 ft 2 in (1.88 m)	RS So	Blue Valley Northwest	Overland Park, KS
F	43	Grace Berg (redshirt)	6 ft 0 in (1.83 m)	Fr	Indianola; Missouri	Indianola, IA
F	50	Sara Rhine	6 ft 1 in (1.85 m)	RS Jr	Eldon	Eldon, MO

Head coach

- Jennie Baranczyk (Iowa)

Assistant coach(es)

- Allison Pohlman (Northern Iowa)
- Nicci Hays Fort (Loyola (MD))
- Markisha Wright (Notre Dame)

Legend

- (C) Team captain
- (S) Suspended
- (I) Ineligible
- (W) Walk-on
- Injured
- Current redshirt

Roster
Last update: August 9, 2024

== Rankings ==
Ranking movement Legend: ██ Increase in ranking. ██ Decrease in ranking. RV = Received votes. NR = Not ranked
Poll	Pre	Wk 2	Wk 3	Wk 4	Wk 5	Wk 6	Wk 7	Wk 8	Wk 9	Wk 10	Wk 11	Wk 12	Wk 13	Wk 14	Wk 15	Wk 16	Wk 17	Wk 18	Wk 19	Final
AP	RV	RV	RV	24	21	RV	RV	NR	NR	RV	RV	RV	RV	RV	RV	24	23	23	21	N/A
Coaches	RV	RV^	RV	24	21	25	RV	NR	NR	NR	RV	RV	RV	RV	RV	24	23	23	21	RV

^ No week 2 poll released

== Schedule ==
Date time, TV	Rank^{#}	Opponent^{#}	Result	Record	Site (attendance) city, state
Exhibition
October 28, 2018*; 2:00 p.m.		Dubuque	W 117–33		Knapp Center (1,993); Des Moines, IA
November 3, 2018*; 5:00 p.m.		Pittsburg State	W 92–55		Knapp Center (2,059); Des Moines, IA
Non-conference regular season
November 7, 2018*; 7:00 p.m., BTN Plus		at Nebraska	W 83–77	1–0	Pinnacle Bank Arena (3,738); Lincoln, NE
November 10, 2018*; 4:30 p.m.		at Western Illinois	W 98–71	2–0	Western Hall (681); Macomb, IL
November 15, 2018*; 6:00 p.m., MC22/ESPN3		South Dakota	W 76–64	3–0	Knapp Center (5,511); Des Moines, IA
November 18, 2018*; 1:00 p.m., ESPN+		Cal State Northridge	W 73–63	4–0	Knapp Center (2,345); Des Moines, IA
November 22, 2018*; 3:30 p.m.		vs. Rutgers; Vancouver Showcase quarterfinals	W 69–59	5–0	Vancouver Convention Centre (383); Vancouver, BC
November 23, 2018*; 9:00 p.m.		vs. No. 1 Notre Dame; Vancouver Showcase semifinals	L 64–82	5–1	Vancouver Convention Centre (1,156); Boulder, CO
November 24, 2018*; 9:30 p.m.		vs. No. 13 South Carolina; Vancouver Showcase 3rd-place game	W 90–85 ^{OT}	6–1	Vancouver Convention Centre (1,866); Boulder, CO
November 28, 2018*; 12:00 p.m.	No. 24	Creighton	W 85–69	7–1	D. J. Sokol Arena (1,535); Omaha, NE
December 4, 2018*; 11:00 a.m., ESPN3	No. 21	Clarke	W 91–43	8–1	Knapp Center (6,031); Des Moines, IA
December 8, 2018*; 2:00 p.m.	No. 21	at South Dakota State	L 71–80	8–2	Frost Arena (1,711); Brookings, SD
December 16, 2018*; 12:00 p.m., Cyclones.TV		at Iowa State	L 81–86	8–3	Hilton Coliseum (10,923); Ames, IA
December 21, 2018*; 6:00 p.m., MC22/ESPN+		No. 16 Iowa	L 82–91	8–4	Knapp Center (6,107); Des Moines, IA
Missouri Valley Conference regular season
January 4, 2019; 7:00 p.m., ESPN+		at Bradley	W 92–63	9–4 (1–0)	Renaissance Coliseum (737); Peoria, IL
January 6, 2019; 2:00 p.m., ESPN+		at Illinois State	W 82–64	10–4 (2–0)	Redbird Arena (592); Normal, IL
January 11, 2019; 6:00 p.m., ESPN+		Loyola–Chicago	W 69–60	11–4 (2–1)	Knapp Center (2,786); Des Moines, IA
January 13, 2019; 2:00 p.m., ESPN3		Valparaiso	W 84–53	12–4 (4–0)	Knapp Center (3,121); Des Moines, IA
January 18, 2019; 7:00 p.m., ESPN3		at Northern Iowa	W 88–64	13–4 (5–0)	McLeod Center (1,458); Cedar Falls, IA
January 25, 2019; 6:00 p.m., ESPN3		at Indiana State	W 70–68	14–4 (6–0)	Hulman Center (1,408); Terre Haute, IN
January 27, 2019; 1:00 p.m., ESPN3		at Evansville	W 78–47	15–4 (7–0)	Meeks Family Fieldhouse (233); Evansville, IN
February 1, 2019; 6:00 p.m., ESPN+		Missouri State	L 79–85	15–5 (7–1)	Knapp Center (3,101); Des Moines, IA
February 3, 2019; 2:00 p.m., ESPN3		Southern Illinois	W 94–66	16–5 (8–1)	Knapp Center (3,683); Des Moines, IA
February 8, 2019; 7:00 p.m., ESPN+		at Valparaiso	W 88–62	17–5 (9–1)	Athletics–Recreation Center (328); Valparaiso, IN
February 10, 2019; 1:00 p.m., ESPN+		at Loyola–Chicago	W 83–55	18–5 (10–1)	Joseph J. Gentile Arena (264); Chicago, IL
February 15, 2019; 6:00 p.m., ESPN3		Northern Iowa	W 76–61	19–5 (11–1)	Knapp Center (3,401); Des Moines, IA
February 22, 2019; 6:00 p.m., ESPN+	No. 24	Evansville	W 66–39	20–5 (12–1)	Knapp Center (3,463); Des Moines, IA
February 24, 2019; 2:00 p.m., ESPN+	No. 24	Indiana State	W 96–77	21–5 (13–1)	Knapp Center (2,878); Des Moines, IA
March 1, 2019; 6:00 p.m., ESPN+	No. 23	at Southern Illinois	W 71–64	22–5 (14–1)	SIU Arena (415); Carbondale, IL
March 3, 2019; 2:00 p.m., ESPN+	No. 23	at Missouri State	W 70–61	23–5 (15–1)	JQH Arena (3,827); Springfield, MO
March 6, 2019; 6:00 p.m., ESPN+	No. 23	Illinois State	W 88–61	24–5 (16–1)	Knapp Center (3,555); Des Moines, IA
March 9, 2019; 2:00 p.m., ESPN+	No. 23	Bradley	W 95–53	25–5 (17–1)	Knapp Center (3,257); Des Moines, IA
Missouri Valley women's tournament
March 15, 2019; 12:00 p.m., ESPN+	(1) No. 21	vs. (9) Valparaiso; Quarterfinals	W 86–58	25–5	TaxSlayer Center (1,509); Moline, IL
March 16, 2019; 1:30 p.m., ESPN+	(1) No. 21	vs. (4) Illinois State; Semifinals	W 65–54	27–5	TaxSlayer Center (2,254); Moline, IL
March 17, 2019; 2:00 p.m., ESPN+	(1) No. 21	vs. (2) Missouri State; Championship game	L 79–94	27–6	TaxSlayer Center (1,558); Moline, IL
NCAA women's tournament
March 22, 2019*; 3:30 p.m., ESPN2	(10 G)	vs. (7 G) Missouri; First round	L 76–77 ^{OT}	27–7	Carver–Hawkeye Arena (10,220); Iowa City, IA
*Non-conference game. ^{#}Rankings from AP poll. (#) Tournament seedings in parentheses. G=Greensboro Region. All times are in Central.
