= 2018–19 Northern Iowa Panthers women's basketball team =

Intercollegiate basketball season

2018–19 Northern Iowa Panthers women's basketball

WNIT, first round
- Conference: Missouri Valley Conference
- Record: 20–13 (12–6 MVC)
- Head coach: Tanya Warren (12th season)
- Assistant coaches: Brandon Nelson; KK Armstrong; Steven Fennelly
- Home arena: McLeod Center

2018–19 Missouri Valley Conference women's basketball standings
	Conf.				Overall
Team	W		L	PCT	W		L	PCT
Drake	17	–	1	.944	27	–	7	.794
Missouri State †	16	–	2	.889	25	–	10	.714
Northern Iowa	12	–	6	.667	20	–	13	.606
Illinois State	11	–	7	.611	19	–	12	.613
Bradley	10	–	8	.556	20	–	10	.667
Southern Illinois	8	–	10	.444	15	–	15	.500
Loyola–Chicago	6	–	12	.333	13	–	18	.419
Indiana State	5	–	13	.278	11	–	19	.367
Valparaiso	3	–	15	.167	8	–	24	.250
Evansville	2	–	16	.111	4	–	26	.133
† 2019 MVC tournament winner As of March 30, 2019; Rankings from AP poll

The 2018–19 Northern Iowa Panthers women's basketball team represented the University of Northern Iowa in the 2018–19 NCAA Division I women's basketball season. The Panthers, led by 12th-year head coach Tanya Warren, played their home games at McLeod Center in Cedar Falls, Iowa and were members of the Missouri Valley Conference (MVC). They finished the season 20–13, 12–6 in MVC play, to finish in third place. They advanced to the semifinals of the Missouri Valley Tournament, where they lost to Missouri State. They received an automatic bid to the Women's National Invitation Tournament, where they lost to Minnesota in the first round.

== Roster ==
2018–19 Northern Iowa Panthers women's basketball team
Players
Coaches

Pos.	#	Name	Height	Year	Previous school	Hometown
G	3	Karli Rucker	5 ft 6 in (1.68 m)	So	North Scott	Eldridge, IA
G	5	Nicole Kroeger	5 ft 10 in (1.78 m)	So	Palmyra	Palmyra, MO
G	10	Ellie Howell	5 ft 9 in (1.75 m)	RS Sr	Manson Northwest Webster	Manson, IA
F	11	Bre Gunnels	6 ft 1 in (1.85 m)	So	Southeast	Kansas City, MO
G	12	Kam Finley	5 ft 9 in (1.75 m)	Fr	Cedar Falls	Cedar Falls, IA
G	20	Alyssa Iverson	5 ft 7 in (1.7 m)	Fr	Harvest Christian Academy	Elgin, IL
G	22	Rose Simon-Ressler	5 ft 10 in (1.78 m)	RS Jr	Western Dubuque	Epworth, IA
G	24	Mikaela Morgan	5 ft 10 in (1.78 m)	Sr	Iowa City West	Coralville, IA
C	30	Cynthia Wolf	6 ft 3 in (1.91 m)	Fr	Cedar Falls	Cedar Falls, IA
F	32	Heidi Hillyard	6 ft 0 in (1.83 m)	RS Jr	Mediapolis	Burlington, IA
F	33	Kiana Barney	6 ft 1 in (1.85 m)	Fr	Cedar Falls	Cedar Falls, IA
F	34	Taylor Hagen	6 ft 1 in (1.85 m)	Sr	Blooming Prairie	Blooming Prairie, MN
G	41	Abby Gerrits	5 ft 10 in (1.78 m)	Jr	Pewaukee	Pewaukee, WI
F	42	Marissa Robson	6 ft 1 in (1.85 m)	So	Stoughton	Oregon, WI
F	50	Megan Maahs	6 ft 1 in (1.85 m)	Jr	Western Dubuque	Epworth, IA

Head coach

- Tanya Warren (Creighton)

Assistant coach(es)

- Brad Nelson (Oregon)
- KK Armstrong (Northern Iowa)
- Steven Fennelly (Iowa State)

Legend

- (C) Team captain
- (S) Suspended
- (I) Ineligible
- (W) Walk-on
- Injured
- Current redshirt

Roster
Last update: February 23, 2025

== Schedule ==
Date time, TV	Rank^{#}	Opponent^{#}	Result	Record	Site (attendance) city, state
Exhibition
November 4, 2018*; 2:00 p.m.		Upper Iowa	W 89–41		McLeod Center (1,229); Cedar Falls, IA
Non-conference regular season
November 9, 2018*; 8:30 p.m., ESPN3		Delaware; Preseason WNIT first round	W 79–67	1–0	McLeod Center (1,295); Cedar Falls, IA
November 11, 2018*; 1:00 p.m.		at No. 19 Marquette; Preseason WNIT quarterfinals	L 61–102	1–1	Al McGuire Center (966); Milwaukee, WI
November 18, 2018*; 2:00 p.m., ESPN3		at Northern Illinois; Preseason WNIT consolation round	L 59–70	1–2	Convocation Center (344); DeKalb, IL
November 20, 2018*; 6:00 p.m., ESPN+		Creighton	W 65–55	2–2	McLeod Center (1,146); Cedar Falls, IA
November 23, 2018*; 9:00 p.m.		at Long Beach State; Bleach Classic	W 71–64	3–2	Walter Pyramid (1,146); Long Beach, CA
November 24, 2018*; 4:00 p.m.		vs. Idaho; Bleach Classic	L 60–61	3–3	Walter Pyramid (1,146); Long Beach, CA
November 30, 2018*; 6:00 p.m., ESPN+		at IUPUI	W 53–40	4–3	The Jungle (305); Indianapolis, IN
December 4, 2018*; 7:00 p.m., ESPN3		North Dakota	W 64–60	5–3	McLeod Center (1,201); Cedar Falls, IA
December 16, 2018*; 2:00 p.m.		at No. 16 Iowa	L 57–83	5–4	Carver–Hawkeye Arena (6,860); Iowa City, IA
December 19, 2018*; 5:00 p.m., ESPN+		Minnesota State	W 73–56	6–4	McLeod Center (1,256); Cedar Falls, IA
December 21, 2018*; 6:00 p.m., ESPN+		Omaha	W 79–50	7–4	McLeod Center (1,129); Cedar Falls, IA
December 29, 2018*; 1:00 p.m., ESPN3		at Kansas State	L 62–72	7–5	Bramlage Coliseum (3,340); Manhattan, KS
Missouri Valley Conference regular season
January 4, 2019; 7:00 p.m., ESPN+		at Illinois State	L 64–66	7–6 (0–1)	Redbird Arena (725); Normal, IL
January 6, 2019; 2:00 p.m., ESPN3		at Bradley	W 81–78 ^{OT}	8–6 (1–1)	Renaissance Coliseum (576); Peoria, IL
January 11, 2019; 7:00 p.m., ESPN+		Valparaiso	W 71–52	9–6 (2–1)	McLeod Center (992); Cedar Falls, IA
January 13, 2019; 11:30 a.m., ESPN+		Loyola–Chicago	W 64–52	10–6 (3–1)	McLeod Center (1,364); Cedar Falls, IA
January 18, 2019; 7:00 p.m., ESPN+		Drake	L 64–88	10–7 (3–2)	McLeod Center (1,458); Cedar Falls, IA
January 25, 2019; 6:00 p.m., ESPN+		at Evansville	W 74–46	11–7 (4–2)	Meeks Family Fieldhouse (253); Evansville, IN
January 27, 2019; 1:00 p.m., ESPN+		at Indiana State	W 71–51	12–7 (5–2)	Hulman Center (1,564); Terre Haute, IN
February 1, 2019; 7:00 p.m., ESPN+		Southern Illinois	W 65–53	13–7 (6–2)	McLeod Center (1,175); Cedar Falls, IA
February 3, 2019; 2:00 p.m., ESPN3		Missouri State	L 58–63	13–8 (6–3)	McLeod Center (1,485); Cedar Falls, IA
February 8, 2019; 7:00 p.m., ESPN3		at Loyola–Chicago	W 71–65	14–8 (7–3)	Joseph J. Gentile Arena (503); Chicago, IL
February 10, 2019; 11:00 a.m.		at Valparaiso	W 64–56	15–8 (8–3)	Athletics–Recreation Center (576); Valparaiso, IN
February 15, 2019; 6:00 p.m., ESPN3		at Drake	L 61–76	15–9 (8–4)	Knapp Center (3,401); Des Moines, IA
February 22, 2019; 7:00 p.m., ESPN3		Indiana State	W 71–63	16–9 (9–4)	McLeod Center (1,381); Cedar Falls, IA
February 24, 2019; 2:00 p.m., ESPN+		Evansville	W 95–46	17–9 (10–4)	McLeod Center (1,012); Cedar Falls, IA
March 1, 2019; 7:00 p.m., ESPN+		at Missouri State	L 48–58	17–10 (10–5)	JQH Arena (3,112); Springfield, MO
March 3, 2019; 1:00 p.m., ESPN+		at Southern Illinois	W 76–67	18–10 (11–5)	SIU Arena (453); Carbondale, IL
March 7, 2019; 7:00 p.m., ESPN+		Bradley	W 61–57	19–10 (12–5)	McLeod Center (1,652); Cedar Falls, IA
March 9, 2019; 2:00 p.m., ESPN+		Illinois State	L 53–54	19–11 (12–6)	McLeod Center (1,596); Cedar Falls, IA
Missouri Valley women's tournament
March 15, 2019; 8:30 p.m., ESPN+	(3)	vs. (6) Southern Illinois; Quarterfinals	W 66–63	20–11	TaxSlayer Center (1,542); Moline, IL
March 16, 2019; 4:00 p.m., ESPN+	(3)	vs. (2) Missouri State; Semifinals	L 64–89	20–12	TaxSlayer Center (2,254); Moline, IL
WNIT
March 22, 2019*; 6:30 p.m.		at Minnesota; First round	L 75–91	20–13	Williams Arena (2,549); Minneapolis, MN
*Non-conference game. ^{#}Rankings from AP poll. (#) Tournament seedings in parentheses. All times are in Central.

== See also ==
- 2018–19 Northern Iowa Panthers men's basketball team
