= Kellie Harper =

American basketball coach and player (born 1977)

- Harper in 2018

Missouri Tigers
- Title: Head coach
- Conference: SEC

Personal information
- Born: May 3, 1977 (age 49) Sparta, Tennessee, U.S.
- Listed height: 5 ft 10 in (1.78 m)

Career information
- High school: White County (Sparta, Tennessee)
- College: Tennessee
- WNBA draft: 1999: 4th round, 47th overall pick
- Drafted by: Cleveland Rockers
- Position: Point guard
- Number: 14
- Coaching career: 2000–present

Career history

Playing
- 1999: Cleveland Rockers

Coaching
- 2000–2001: Auburn (assistant)
- 2001–2004: Chattanooga (assistant)
- 2004–2009: Western Carolina
- 2009–2013: NC State
- 2013–2019: Missouri State
- 2019–2024: Tennessee
- 2025–present: Missouri

Career highlights
- As player: 3× NCAA champion (1996–1998); As coach: SoCon regular season (2007); 2× SoCon Tournament (2005, 2009); 2× MVC tournament (2016, 2019); SoCon Coach of the Year (2007); MVC Coach of the Year (2019); Kay Yow Coach of the Year (2019)
- Stats at Basketball Reference

Kellie Jolly Harper (born May 3, 1977) is the current head coach for the Missouri Tigers women's basketball team. She previously served as head coach of Western Carolina, NC State, Missouri State, and Tennessee.

== Playing career ==
Born Kellie Jean Jolly in Sparta, Tennessee, she is a graduate of White County High School in Sparta, where she earned many honors as a high school basketball player.

In college, she was one of the starting point guards for the Tennessee Lady Volunteers during their three consecutive NCAA women's national championships from 1996 to 1998. In 1997, Harper was named to the Final Four All Tournament team.

== Career statistics ==
Legend
GP	Games played	GS	Games started	MPG	Minutes per game	RPG	Rebounds per game
APG	Assists per game	SPG	Steals per game	BPG	Blocks per game	PPG	Points per game
TO	Turnovers per game	FG%	Field-goal percentage	3P%	3-point field-goal percentage	FT%	Free-throw percentage
**Bold**	Career best	°	League leader

=== WNBA ===
==== Regular season ====
Year	Team	GP	GS	MPG	FG%	3P%	FT%	RPG	APG	SPG	BPG	TO	PPG
1999	Cleveland	1	0	4.0	0.0	0.0	0.0	0.0	1.0	0.0	0.0	2.0	0.0
Career	1 year, 1 team	1	0	4.0	0.0	0.0	0.0	0.0	1.0	0.0	0.0	2.0	0.0

=== College ===
Year	Team	GP	GS	MPG	FG%	3P%	FT%	RPG	APG	SPG	BPG	TO	PPG
1995–96	Tennessee	36	-	-	43.1	24.4	69.4	1.2	1.9	0.7	0.1	-	4.2
1996–97	Tennessee	23	-	-	40.9	35.7	75.0	1.9	4.1	1.3	0.0	-	8.4
1997–98	Tennessee												
1998–99	Tennessee	34	-	-	44.9	37.6	70.4	2.3	4.1	1.4	0.0	-	7.5
**Career**		93	-	-	44.1	36.4	75.5	2.7	4.8	1.9	0.1	-	9.6
Statistics retrieved from Sports-Reference.

== Coaching career ==
On January 28, 2008, Harper earned her 66th win, passing Beth Dunkenberger as the second winningest women's basketball coach in Western Carolina history with a 60–49 victory over College of Charleston at the Ramsey Center.

NC State athletic director Debbie Yow fired Harper on March 26, 2013, after Harper compiled an overall four-year record for the Wolfpack of 70–64 but only 23–39 within the Atlantic Coast Conference.

On April 10, 2013, Harper was named head coach of the Missouri State Lady Bears, a member of the Missouri Valley Conference. Beginning with the 2014–15 season, she led the Lady Bears to five consecutive top-three finishes in the MVC and five consecutive postseason trips, including berths in the NCAA Tournament in 2016 and 2019.

The 2018–19 season proved to be a career year for Harper. The Lady Bears finished the regular season 20–9 (16–2 MVC), after starting the season 1–7. Harper was voted the Missouri Valley Conference Coach of the Year for her efforts. She became the first Missouri State coach to win the award since Cheryl Burnett in 1994. After defeating top-seeded and nationally ranked #24 Drake Bulldogs in the Missouri Valley Conference tournament Finals, Harper's team received an 11–seed in the Chicago Region. Harper guided the Lady Bears to the Sweet Sixteen with upset wins over 6–seed DePaul and 3–seed Iowa State Cyclones, in games in Ames, Iowa. The Lady Bears fell to 2–seed Stanford in the Sweet Sixteen. Harper was named the Kay Yow Coach of the Year award winner for 2019.

On April 8, 2019, Tennessee hired Harper as the next coach of the Lady Volunteers. In her first season, she led the Lady Volunteers to a 21–10 record. The season ended with a loss to Kentucky in the SEC Tournament as the NCAA Division I women's basketball tournament was cancelled due to the COVID-19 pandemic. In her second season, she led the Volunteers to a 17–8 record that ended with a loss to Michigan in the Round of 32 in the NCAA Tournament. In her third season in 2021–22, she led the Lady Vols to a 25–9 record that ended with a loss to Louisville in the Sweet 16. The following year, she led the Lady Vols to a 25–12 record that culminated with another loss in the Sweet 16, this time to Virginia Tech. In her fifth season, she led the Lady Vols to a 20–13 record that saw the season end in the Round of 32 to NC State. On April 1, 2024, Harper was fired as Tennessee head coach after five seasons and four straight NCAA tournament appearances. The Lady Vols won six NCAA tournament games in those four years. They were eliminated twice in the Sweet Sixteen and twice in the second round.

Following her firing from Tennessee, Harper served as a women's basketball analyst on the SEC Network for the 2024–25 season and provided analysis at the SEC Women's Basketball Tournament.

On March 18, 2025, Harper was hired by the Missouri Tigers. She went 17–17 in her first season at Missouri.

== Personal life ==
In 1999 she married Jon Harper, a member of her coaching staff at Western Carolina, North Carolina State, Missouri State, and Tennessee. She has two children, Jackson and Kiley.

== Head coaching record ==
Record table
Season	Team	Overall	Conference	Standing	Postseason
Western Carolina Catamounts (Southern Conference) (2004–2009)
2004–05	Western Carolina	18–14	10–10	T–5th	NCAA First Round
2005–06	Western Carolina	9–20	8–10	5th	
2006–07	Western Carolina	24–10	15–3	1st	WNIT Second Round
2007–08	Western Carolina	25–9	15–3	2nd	WNIT First Round
2008–09	Western Carolina	21–12	14–6	T–3rd	NCAA First Round
Western Carolina:		97–65 (.599)	62–32 (.660)		
NC State Wolfpack (Atlantic Coast Conference) (2009–2012)
2009–10	NC State	20–14	7–7	T–5th	NCAA First Round
2010–11	NC State	14–17	4–10	10th	
2011–12	NC State	19–16	5–11	9th	WNIT Second Round
2012–13	NC State	17–17	7–11	7th	WNIT Second Round
NC State:		70–64 (.522)	23–39 (.442)		
Missouri State Lady Bears (Missouri Valley Conference) (2013–2019)
2013–14	Missouri State	14–17	8–10	T–6th	
2014–15	Missouri State	18–15	13–5	3rd	WNIT First Round
2015–16	Missouri State	24–10	14–4	T–2nd	NCAA First Round
2016–17	Missouri State	16–15	12–6	3rd	WNIT First Round
2017–18	Missouri State	21–12	15–3	2nd	WNIT Second Round
2018–19	Missouri State	25–10	16–2	2nd	NCAA Sweet Sixteen
Missouri State:		118–79 (.599)	78–30 (.722)		
Tennessee Lady Volunteers (Southeastern Conference) (2019–2024)
2019–20	Tennessee	21–10	10–6	T–3rd	Postseason not held due to COVID-19
2020–21	Tennessee	17–8	9–4	3rd	NCAA Second Round
2021–22	Tennessee	25–9	11–5	3rd	NCAA Sweet Sixteen
2022–23	Tennessee	25–12	13–3	3rd	NCAA Sweet Sixteen
2023–24	Tennessee	20–13	10–6	T–4th	NCAA Second Round
Tennessee:		108–52 (.675)	53–24 (.688)		
Missouri Tigers (Southeastern Conference) (2025–present)
2025–26	Missouri	17–17	4–12	14th	WBIT Second Round
2026–27	Missouri	3–0	0–0		
Missouri:		20–17 (.541)	4–12 (.250)		
Total:		413–277 (.599)			
National champion Postseason invitational champion Conference regular season champion Conference regular season and conference tournament champion Division regular season champion Division regular season and conference tournament champion Conference tournament champion
