= Missouri Tigers women's basketball =

Missouri Tigers
2026–27 Missouri Tigers women's basketball team
- University: University of Missouri
- Head coach: Kellie Harper (2nd season)
- Location: Columbia, Missouri
- Arena: Mizzou Arena (capacity: 15,061)
- Conference: SEC
- Nickname: Tigers
- Colors: Black and gold

NCAA Division I tournament Sweet Sixteen
- 1982, 2001

NCAA Division I tournament appearances
- 1982, 1983, 1984, 1985, 1986, 1994, 2001, 2004, 2006, 2016, 2017, 2018, 2019

AIAW tournament appearances
- 1977, 1978

Conference tournament champions
- 1978, 1983, 1985, 1986, 1994

Conference regular-season champions
- 1984, 1985, 1987, 1990

Uniforms
Home	Away	Alternate

The Missouri Tigers women's basketball team represents the University of Missouri and competes in the NCAA Division I. The team plays its home games at Mizzou Arena in Columbia, Missouri, and plays in the Southeastern Conference.

== Roster ==
Years are listed according to the new NCAA age-based eligibility model.

2026–27 Missouri Tigers women's basketball team
Players
Coaches

Pos.	#	Name	Height	Year	Previous school	Hometown
G	0	Grace Slaughter	6 ft 2 in (1.88 m)	Sr	Grain Valley High School	Grain Valley, MO
G	1	Neveah Caffey	5 ft 10 in (1.78 m)	So	Incarnate Word Academy; Indiana	Warrenton, MO
G	2	Natalya Hodge	5 ft 7 in (1.7 m)	Fr	Bearden High School	Knoxville, TN
F	5	Khloe Ford	6 ft 4 in (1.93 m)	Fr	Hoover High School	Hoover, AL
G	7	Tanyuel Welch (5th)	5 ft 10 in (1.78 m)	Sr	North Central High School; Arizona	Indianapolis, IN
F	11	Cecilie Brandimore	6 ft 4 in (1.93 m)	Fr	Franklin High School	Franklin, TN
G	12	Jada Maples	5 ft 10 in (1.78 m)	Fr	Earle High School	Earle, AR
F	15	Ellie Muller	6 ft 3 in (1.91 m)	Fr	Dowling Catholic High School	West Des Moines, IA
G	21	Averi Kroenke (5th)	5 ft 11 in (1.8 m)	Sr	Rock Bridge High School	Columbia, MO
G	23	Abbey Schreacke	6 ft 0 in (1.83 m)	Sr	Quincy Notre Dame High School	Quincy, IL
G	25	McKenzie Mathurin	5 ft 10 in (1.78 m)	So	Broken Arrow High School; Michigan	Broken Arrow, OK
F	55	Reka Toman	6 ft 0 in (1.83 m)	So	Eötvös József Gimnázium; Soproni Darazsak Sportakadémia	Budapest, Hungary

Head coach

- Kellie Harper (Tennessee)

Assistant coach(es)

- Jennifer Sullivan (Memphis)
- Kenzie Kostas (Missouri State)
- Liza Fruendt (Missouri State)
- Mike Nicholson (Missouri)
- Devin Hill (DePaul)

Legend

- (C) Team captain
- (S) Suspended
- (I) Ineligible
- (W) Walk-on
- (5th) Fifth year senior
- Injured
- Current redshirt

Roster
Last update: August 1, 2026

== History ==
Missouri first fielded a women's team during the 1974–1975 season. The team's best post-season result was appearing in the Sweet Sixteen (1982 and 2001).

=== Head coaches ===
- Alexis Jarrett, 1974–1975
- Joann Rutherford, 1975–1998
- Cindy Stein, 1998–2010
- Robin Pingeton, 2010–2025
- Kellie Harper, 2025–present

== Conferences ==
Missouri has played in the Big 8 and the Big 12 conferences. The Tigers joined the Big 12 in 1997 when the Big 8 merged with several former members of the defunct Southwest Conference. Since 2012, the team has played in the Southeastern Conference after leaving the Big 12 Conference.

== Year-by-year results ==
Conference tournament winners noted with ‡

Season	Team	Overall	Conference	Standing	Postseason	Coaches' poll	AP poll
Alexis Jarrett (Independent) (1974–1975)
1974–75	Alexis Jarrett	9–8	–		MAIAW		
Alexis Jarrett:		9–8	–				
Joann Rutherford (Independent, Big 8, Big 12) (1975–1998)
1975–76	Joann Rutherford	10–9	–		MAIAW		
1976–77	Joann Rutherford	28–12	–		AIAW Top 12		
1977–78	Joann Rutherford	26–6	–	‡ #1(Big 8)	AIAW Top 12		13
1978–79	Joann Rutherford	18–12	–		MAIAW		
1979–80	Joann Rutherford	20–13	–		AIAW Region VI		
1980–81	Joann Rutherford	21–12	–		AIAW Region VI		
1981–82	Joann Rutherford	24–9	–		NCAA Sweet Sixteen		20
1982–83	Joann Rutherford	25–6	10–4	2nd‡ (Big 8)	NCAA First Round		15
1983–84	Joann Rutherford	25–6	12–2	2nd	NCAA First Round		11
1984–85	Joann Rutherford	22–9	12–2	1st‡	NCAA First Round		
1985–86	Joann Rutherford	20–12	8–6	5th‡	NCAA Second Round (Play-In)		
1986–87	Joann Rutherford	20–9	9–5	T-1st			
1987–88	Joann Rutherford	18–11	9–5	2nd			
1988–89	Joann Rutherford	17–12	7–7	4th			
1989–90	Joann Rutherford	20–8	11–3	1st			
1990–91	Joann Rutherford	10–18	3–11	8th			
1991–92	Joann Rutherford	16–12	7–7	5th			
1992–93	Joann Rutherford	19–8	8–6	5th			
1993–94	Joann Rutherford	12–18	3–11	7th‡	NCAA First Round		
1994–95	Joann Rutherford	15–12	5–9	6th			
1995–96	Joann Rutherford	15–12	6–8	5th			
1996–97	Joann Rutherford	10–20	3–13	T-10th (Big 12)			
1997–98	Joann Rutherford	11–16	3–13	12th			
Joann Rutherford:		422–262	116–112				
Cindy Stein (Big 12) (1998–2010)
1998–99	Cindy Stein	13–15	5–11	10th			
1999–2000	Cindy Stein	18–12	7–9	7th	WNIT 2nd round		
2000–01	Cindy Stein	22–10	10–6	5th	NCAA Sweet Sixteen	19	
2001–02	Cindy Stein	14–15	5–11	T-9th	WNIT First Round		
2002–03	Cindy Stein	17–14	9–7	T-5th	WNIT Quarterfinals		
2003–04	Cindy Stein	17–13	7–9	T-7th	NCAA First Round		
2004–05	Cindy Stein	11–18	4–12	T-9th			
2005–06	Cindy Stein	21–10	10–6	4th	NCAA First Round		
2006–07	Cindy Stein	17–14	5–11	10th	WNIT First Round (Bye)		
2007–08	Cindy Stein	10–21	2–14	12th			
2008–09	Cindy Stein	13–17	4–12	T-10th			
2009–10	Cindy Stein	12–18	2–14	12th			
Cindy Stein:		185–177	70–122				
Robin Pingeton (Big 12, SEC) (2010–2025)
2010–11	Robin Pingeton	13–18	5–11	10th (Big 12)			
2011–12	Robin Pingeton	13–18	2–16	10th			
Southeastern Conference
2012–13	Robin Pingeton	17–15	6–10	T-8th (SEC)	WNIT First Round		
2013–14	Robin Pingeton	17–14	6–10	8th	WNIT First Round		
2014–15	Robin Pingeton	19–14	7–9	T-7th	WNIT 3rd Round		
2015–16	Robin Pingeton	22–10	8–8	T-7th	NCAA second round		
2016-17	Robin Pingeton	22-11	11–5	T-3rd	NCAA second round	25	
2017-18	Robin Pingeton	22-5	10–4	T-3rd	NCAA first round	17	22
2018-19	Robin Pingeton	24-11	10-6	T-5th	NCAA second round	16	14
2019-20	Robin Pingeton	9-22	5-11	11th			
2020-21	Robin Pingeton	9-13	5-9	10th	WNIT first round		
2021-22	Robin Pingeton	18-11	7-9	9th	WNIT first round		
2022-23	Robin Pingeton	17-12	6-10	9th	WNIT second round		
2023-24	Robin Pingeton	11-19	2-14	14th			
2024-25	Robin Pingeton	14-18	3-13	T–13th			
Robin Pingeton:		250–217	94–148				
Kellie Harper (SEC) (2025–present)
2025–26	Kellie Harper	17–17	4–12	14th			
2026–27	Kellie Harper	3–0	0–0				
Kellie Harper:		20–17	4–12				
Total:		887–681					
National champion Postseason invitational champion Conference regular season champion Conference regular season and conference tournament champion Division regular season champion Division regular season and conference tournament champion Conference tournament champion

== NCAA tournament results ==
Missouri is 7–13 in thirteen appearances.

Year	Seed	Round	Opponent	Result
1982	#3	First Round; Sweet Sixteen	#6 Oregon #2 Maryland	W 59-53; L 68-80
1983	#4	First Round	#5 Auburn	L 76-94
1984	#4	First Round	#5 LSU	L 82-92
1985	#7	First Round	#2 NE Louisiana	L 84-85 (OT)
1986	#9	First Round; Second Round	#8 Arkansas #1 Texas	W 66-65; L 67-108
1994	#15	First Round	#2 Texas Tech	L 61-75
2001	#10	First Round; Second Round; Sweet Sixteen	#7 Wisconsin #2 Georgia #3 Louisiana Tech	W 71-68; W 78-65; L 67-78
2004	#11	First Round	#6 Stanford	L 44-68
2006	#10	First Round	#7 Virginia Tech	L 51-82
2016	#10	First Round; Second Round	#7 BYU #2 Texas	W 78-69; L 55-73
2017	#6	First Round; Second Round	#11 South Florida #3 Florida State	W 66-64; L 55-77
2018	#5	First Round	#12 Florida Gulf Coast	L 70-80
2019	#7	First Round; Second Round	#10 Drake #2 Iowa	W 77-76 (OT); L 52-68

== WBIT results ==
Year	Seed	Round	Opponent	Result
2026	#4	First Round; Second Round	Seton Hall #1 BYU	W 67–57; L 75–93

== See also ==
- 2009–10 Missouri Tigers women's basketball team
