= Western Michigan Broncos women's basketball =

2026-27 Western Michigan Broncos women's basketball team
- University: Western Michigan University
- Head coach: Kate Achter (2nd season)
- Location: Kalamazoo, Michigan
- Arena: University Arena (capacity: 5,421)
- Conference: Mid-American
- Nickname: Broncos
- Colors: Brown and gold

NCAA Division I tournament appearances
- 1985, 2003

Conference tournament champions
- 1985, 2003

Uniforms
Home	Away

The Western Michigan Broncos women's basketball team represents Western Michigan University, in Kalamazoo, Michigan in women's basketball. The school competes in the Mid-American Conference in Division I of the National Collegiate Athletic Association (NCAA). The Broncos play home basketball games at the University Arena near the campus in Kalamazoo, Michigan.

== Season-by-season record ==
Western Michigan has a 755–842 record since starting play in 1967 with a 339–415 record in Mid-American Conference play. They have won the MAC tournament (1985, 2003) while being the tournament runner-up in 1988, and the Broncos have won a division title (2000) as well. While they haven't advanced past the first round of the NCAA tournament, they have qualified for the Women's National Invitation Tournament (WNIT) four times (1999, 2000, 2004, 2015) and advanced to the quarterfinals in 2004.

Season	Coach	Record	Conference Record
1967–68	Fran Ebert	6–6	n/a
1968–69	Fran Ebert	1–9	n/a
1969–70	Fran Ebert	3–5	n/a
1970–71	Fran Ebert	7–5	n/a
1971–72	Fran Ebert	14–3	n/a
1972–73	Fran Ebert	13–3	n/a
1972–73	Fran Ebert	13–3	n/a
1973–74	Fran Ebert	9–9	n/a
1974–75	Fran Ebert	16–5	n/a
1975–76	Fran Ebert	20–3	n/a
1976–77	Fran Ebert	13–12	n/a
1977–78	Fran Ebert	21–5	n/a
1978–79	Fran Ebert	12–17	n/a
1979–80	Fran Ebert	19–10	n/a
1980–81	Fran Ebert	18–13	n/a
1981–82	Fran Ebert	7–19	n/a
1982–83	Jim Hess	3–23	0–18
1983–84	Jim Hess	13–12	8–10
1984–85	Jim Hess	19–10	14–4
1985–86	Jim Hess	12–15	9–9
1986–87	Jim Hess	17–10	10–6
1987–88	Jim Hess	19–10	12–4
1988–89	Jim Hess	11–16	6–10
1989–90	Jim Hess	10–17	5–11
1990–91	Pat Charity	9–18	4–12
1991–92	Pat Charity	2–25	1–15
1992–93	Pat Charity	14–13	10–8
1993–94	Pat Charity	16–12	9–9
1994–95	Pat Charity	17–11	13–5
1995–96	Pat Charity	13–14	10–8
1996–97	Pat Charity	3–23	3–15
1997–98	Ron Stewart	7–19	5–13
1998–99	Ron Stewart	19–10	11–5
1999–2000	Ron Stewart	18–12	14–2
2000–01	Ron Stewart	9–19	6–10
2001–02	Ron Stewart	16–15	11–5
2002–03	Ron Stewart	20–12	10–6
2003–04	Ron Stewart	19–13	11–5
2004–05	Ron Stewart	10–18	7–9
2005–06	Ron Stewart	14–14	11–5
2006–07	Ron Stewart	14–18	6–10
2007–08	Ron Stewart	13–19	9–7
2008–09	Tasha McDowell	7–23	3–13
2009–10	Tasha McDowell	9–21	4–12
2010–11	Tasha McDowell	9–21	5–11
2011–12	Tasha McDowell	8–22	5–11
2012–13	Shane Clipfell	11–20	7–11
2013–14	Shane Clipfell	13–18	8–10
2014–15	Shane Clipfell	20–13	11–7
2015–16	Shane Clipfell	17–15	8–10
2016–17	Shane Clipfell	19–13	8–10
2017–18	Shane Clipfell	18–15	9–9
2018–19	Shane Clipfell	10–20	4–13
2019–20	Shane Clipfell	18–13	10–8
2020–21	Shane Clipfell	6–15	5–14
2021–22	Shane Clipfell	16–14	10–10
2022–23	Shane Clipfell	12–17	7-11
2023–24	Shane Clipfell	12-18	7-11
2024–25	Shane Clipfell	12-18	8–10
2025–26	Kate Achter	9-20	5-13
2026–27	Kate Achter	0-1	0-0

== NCAA tournament results ==
Year	Seed	Round	Opponent	Result
1985	#8	First Round	#1 Texas	L 84–62
2003	#14	First Round	#3 Stanford	L 82–66
