= Cindy Stein =

American basketball coach

Biographical details
- Born: January 22, 1961 (age 65); Peoria, Illinois, U.S.

Playing career
- 1979–1981: Illinois Central
- 1981–1983: Illinois

Coaching career (HC unless noted)
- 1984–1986: Central Michigan (GA)
- 1986–1987: Miami (OH) (asst.)
- 1987–1988: Cincinnati (asst.)
- 1988–1993: Bradley (asst.)
- 1993–1995: Illinois (asst.)
- 1995–1998: Emporia State
- 1998–2010: Missouri
- 2012–2013: Illinois Central
- 2013–2022: Southern Illinois

Head coaching record
- Overall: 340–272 (.556)

Accomplishments and honors

Championships
- MIAA regular season (1998); MIAA Tournament (1998)

Awards
- National Coach of the Year (1998): WBCA; Molten Division II Bulletin; Kansas Basketball Coaches Association; MIAA Coach of the Year (1998)

Cindy Stein (born January 22, 1961) is a former basketball coach. She was the head women's basketball coach at Southern Illinois University Carbondale from 2013 to 2022. She is the former coach of the Missouri Tigers women's basketball team at the University of Missouri from 1998 to 2010 and at Illinois Central College from 2012 to 2013. She was the head coach for the Cougars from April 3, 2012, until April 2, 2013, when she was named head coach of the SIU Women's basketball team.

== Playing career ==
Stein was a junior college All-American, playing her first college basketball at Illinois Central College. She later transferred to the University of Illinois at Urbana–Champaign, an NCAA Division I school, where she played in her first NCAA Division I tournament in 1982. She ranks sixth in career assists (323) for the Illinois Fighting Illini and holds the highest career average for assists per game (5.6). In 1982–83, she set the second highest career assist total in school history (170). She graduated from Illinois in 1984 with a bachelor's degree in physical education.

== Coaching career ==
Stein was a graduate assistant and coach for Central Michigan University, where she earned a master's degree in physical education with an emphasis in athletic administration. After jobs as an assistant coach at Miami University, the University of Cincinnati, and Bradley University, Stein returned to her alma mater, first as a recruiting coach, and then as an assistant coach for her former team.

Her first head coaching assignment came at Emporia State University, an NCAA Division II school in Emporia, Kansas. In three years as head coach at Emporia State, Stein turned the women's basketball program into a national contender, with her team advancing to the NCAA Division II title game in 1998. This success earned Stein various coaching awards, including being named the Division II Basketball coach of the year.

Stein coached for 12 seasons Missouri. She compiled a 185–177 career mark at Missouri from 1998 to 2010. She led the Tigers to two NCAA tournament berths, including a 2001 Sweet 16 appearance. She has had 29 selections to the Academic All Big 12 teams. In the Big 12 Conference, she guided the Tigers to multiple seasons above .500 in league play. She announced her resignation, effective at the end of the 2009–10 season, on her radio show on March 1, 2010.

Stein was a TV analyst for Fox Sports basketball games. From 2010 to 2012, she provided color commentary for Kansas City women's basketball along with play-by-play broadcaster T. J. Jackson on KCWJ.
