= Illinois Central College =

Community college in East Peoria, Illinois, US

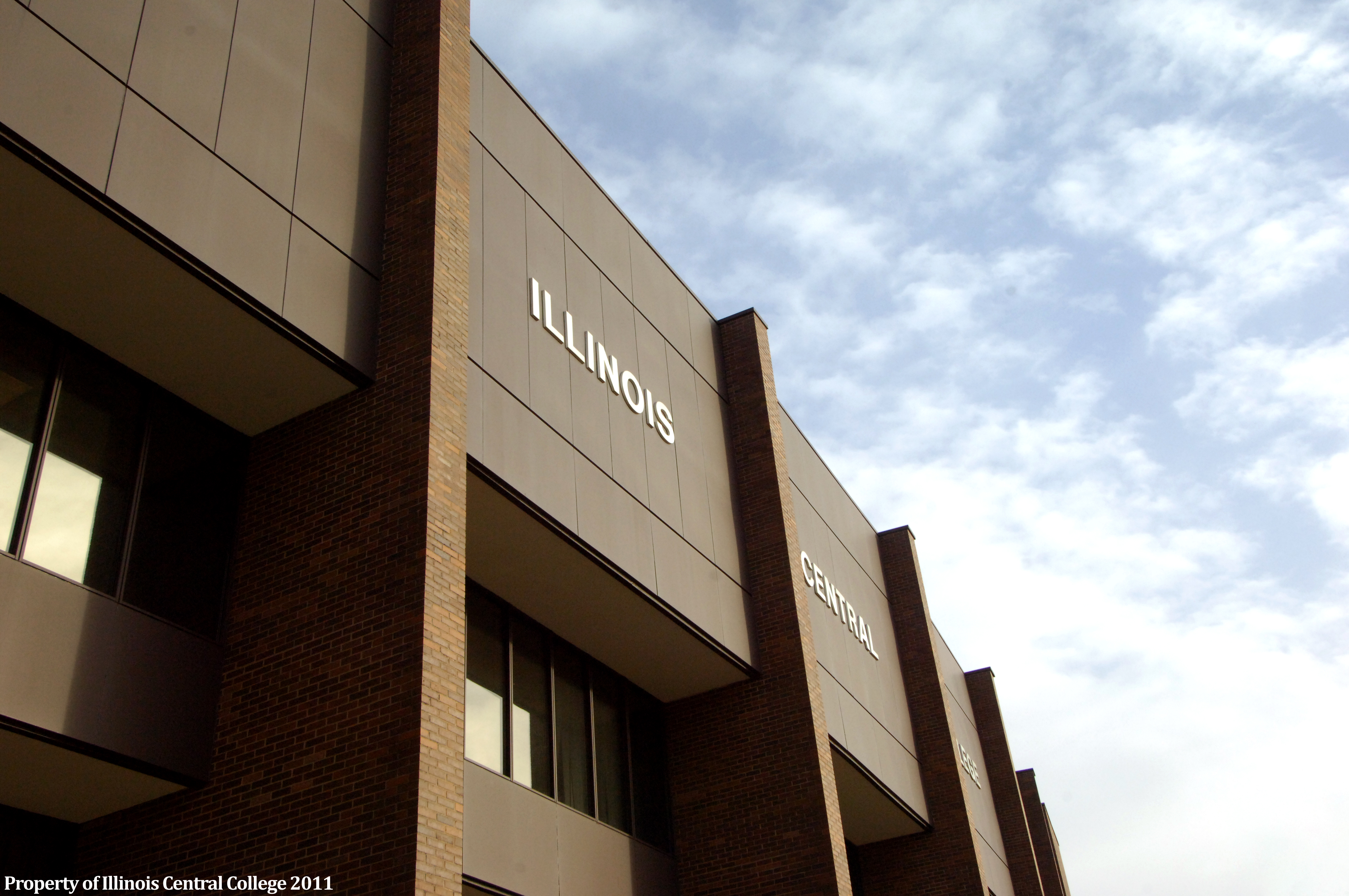
- Library and Administration Building at the ICC East Peoria Campus
- Motto: Ancora Imparo; I am still learning.
- Type: Public community college
- Established: 1967
- Parent institution: Illinois Community College System
- President: Dr. Jamonica Rolle
- Academic staff: 664
- Students: 7,044 (Fall 2022)
- Location: East Peoria, Illinois, U.S. 40°42′28″N 89°31′30″W
- Colors: Royal blue & athletic gold
- Sporting affiliations: NJCAA; Mid-West Athletic Conference
- Mascot: Cougars
- Website: www.icc.edu

Illinois Central College (ICC) is a public community college with its main campus in East Peoria, Illinois. It is part of the Illinois Community College System and its district, Illinois Community College District 514, is a 2,322-square-mile (6,010 km^{2}) includes most of Peoria, Tazewell, and Woodford counties and parts of Bureau, Logan, Marshall, Livingston, McLean, Stark, and Mason counties.

== Academics ==
ICC offers 69 transferable Associate in Arts and Sciences programs, 84 Associate in Applied Science programs, and 104 occupational certificate programs. More than 3,300 classes are offered each semester, and the average class size is 14. It is accredited by the Higher Learning Commission.

== Campuses ==
ICC has three campuses:

- ICC - Peoria at 5407 North University, in Peoria
- ICC – Pekin at 225 Hannah Dr, in Pekin
- ICC – East Peoria at 1 College Dr, in East Peoria (main campus)

The East Peoria Campus is home to the Performing Arts Center, the David R. Leitch Career and Counseling Center, the Lee Morgan School of Industrial Technology, the Caterpillar Dealer Service Technology Program, and the General Motors Automotive Service Educational program. Illinois Central College's web curriculum is recognized by as a WOW Professional Academy.

The former Downtown Campus was formally closed prior to the 2018–19 academic year.

Illinois Central College has libraries at two locations: one at the East Peoria Campus, in the Edwards Library and Administration Building, and the other at the Peoria Campus, in the Student Center, known as the Banwart Library. ICC has agreements with the OSF and Methodist Colleges of Nursing and with Illinois State University's Mennonite College of Nursing where students can earn an associate and then a bachelor's in nursing; it also has an LPN-RN program, an LPN program, a medical technician program, and a CNA program. ICC's culinary school at the North Campus has an Exemplary status accreditation with the American Culinary Federation Education Foundation's Accrediting Commission (ACFEFAC).

== Student life ==
ICC has more than 40 official student clubs and organizations. Academic clubs include the CONNECT program for transfer students, and 4 honor societies: Sigma Kappa Delta, Lambda Beta, Phi Rho Pi, and Phi Theta Kappa.

Harbinger Student Media is the student newspaper and is distributed solely online. Working for the organization can be arranged as academic credit or as an extra-curricular activity.

== Sports ==
ICC is a member of the National Junior College Athletic Association and participates in intercollegiate NJCAA basketball (Division II), men's soccer (I), men's baseball (II), men's golf (II), women's fast-pitch softball (II), women's soccer (I), and women's volleyball (II). Intercollegiate participation is only open to full-time students with a 2.0 grade point average.

There is a disc golf course and a tennis court on campus, as well as the Lorene Ramsey Gymnasium and Fitness Center, housed within the ICC CougarPlex, which was drastically expanded from 2009 to 2011.

=== Teams ===
The six-time national champion women's basketball program is very well known. Lorene Ramsey's 33 years coaching the team brought them 887 wins to 197 losses (.818), and five NJCAA Women's Basketball Championship titles in Division II: 1992, 1993, 1998, 1999, and 2003. After Ramsey's retirement, the team achieved a sixth championship win in 2006. Famous players from the women's basketball team include Christelle N'Garsanet (2003), who was signed by the New York Liberty in the WNBA, and Cindy Ellis, who played for the Milwaukee Does in the Women's Professional Basketball League and was in the trials for the 1976 Olympic team. Ramsey is presently in 14 different halls-of-fame, and there is currently a documentary in the works to showcase her efforts in collegiate athletics.

The ICC softball team has also won two national championships, with those coming in 1982 and 1998.

In the fall of 2009, the Women's Volleyball program won the NJCAA Division II National Championship. The Cougars were coached that season by AVCA Hall-of-Famer Sue Sinclair.

During the 2018–2019 season, the Women's Basketball team achieved a #1 overall ranking in the National polls. The team finished with a (32-3) record, having at one point won 31 consecutive games, which stands as a program record.

In the fall of 2021, Baseball Hall-of-Fame member and Illinois Central College alum Jim Thome returned to campus, when the baseball and softball complex was named in his honor. Thome participated in a tour of the campus athletic facilities, speak at a dinner, and also throw out the first pitch of an intrasquad baseball scrimmage to conclude the festivities.

== Transportation ==
The campuses of Illinois Central College in East Peoria and Peoria are served by CityLink. Route 20 provides bus service from the East Peoria campus to downtown Peoria and other destinations. The Peoria campus is served by Route 1, which also connects that campus to downtown Peoria.

== Notable alumni ==
- Trenesha Biggers — wrestler
- Mark Clark — civil rights activist who was assassinated in Chicago
- Kent Hovind — Christian fundamentalist apologist and tax evader
- Aaron Schock — former United States Congressman
- Cindy Stein — women's college basketball coach
- Jim Thome — professional baseball player
- Andrew Werner — professional baseball player

== See also ==
- Category:Illinois Central College people
