= 2018–19 Bowling Green Falcons women's basketball team =

Intercollegiate basketball season

2018–19 Bowling Green Falcons women's basketball
- Conference: Mid-American Conference
- East Division
- Record: 9–21 (2–16 MAC)
- Head coach: Robyn Fralick (1st season)
- Assistant coaches: Kim Cameron; Karmen Graham; Joel Whymer
- Home arena: Stroh Center

2018–19 Mid-American Conference women's basketball standings
	Conf.				Overall
Team	W		L	PCT	W		L	PCT
East
Ohio	14	–	4	.778	30	–	6	.833
Miami (OH)	13	–	5	.722	23	–	9	.719
Buffalo †	12	–	6	.667	24	–	10	.706
Kent State	11	–	7	.611	20	–	13	.606
Akron	7	–	11	.389	16	–	15	.516
Bowling Green	2	–	16	.111	9	–	21	.300
West
Central Michigan	15	–	3	.833	25	–	8	.758
Toledo	11	–	7	.611	21	–	12	.636
Northern Illinois	10	–	8	.556	19	–	13	.594
Eastern Michigan	6	–	12	.333	14	–	17	.452
Western Michigan	4	–	14	.222	10	–	20	.333
Ball State	3	–	15	.167	8	–	23	.258
† 2019 MAC tournament winner

The 2018–19 Bowling Green Falcons women's basketball team represented Bowling Green State University during the 2018–19 NCAA Division I women's basketball season. The Falcons, led by first year head coach Robyn Fralick, played their home games at the Stroh Center as members of the East Division of the Mid-American Conference. They finished the season 9–21, 2–16 in MAC play to finish in last place in the East Division. They lost in the first round of the MAC women's tournament to Kent State.

== Roster ==
2018–19 Bowling Green Falcons women's basketball team
Players
Coaches

Pos.	#	Name	Height	Year	Previous school	Hometown
G/F	3	Andrea Cecil	6 ft 1 in (1.85 m)	Jr	Oak Harbor	Oak Harbor, OH
G	4	Madisen Parker	5 ft 9 in (1.75 m)	So	Homestead	Fort Wayne, IN
G	5	Alyssa Dean	5 ft 8 in (1.73 m)	RS So	Centennial; Memphis	Columbus, OH
G	13	Sydney Lambert	5 ft 8 in (1.73 m)	Sr	McAuley	Cincinnati, OH
G	21	Morgan McMillen	5 ft 9 in (1.75 m)	Fr	Hiland	Berlin, OH
G/F	22	Molly Dever	5 ft 9 in (1.75 m)	Fr	St. Joseph Academy	Cleveland, OH
G	23	Caterrion Thompson	5 ft 10 in (1.78 m)	Jr	Lima Senior	Lima, OH
C	24	Jane Uecker	6 ft 3 in (1.91 m)	Jr	St. Vincent-St. Mary	Akron, OH
C	25	Terri Battle	6 ft 2 in (1.88 m)	So	Simeon	Chicago, IL
F	30	Sydney Palermo	6 ft 2 in (1.88 m)	Fr	Villa Maria Academy	Erie, PA
G	35	Kadie Hempfling	5 ft 9 in (1.75 m)	Fr	Ottawa-Glandorf	Ottawa, OH
C	40	Clare Glowniak	6 ft 2 in (1.88 m)	RS So	Flushing	Corunna, MI
F	42	Sierra Thompson	5 ft 11 in (1.8 m)	So	Mattoon	Mattoon, IL
F	44	Maddie Cole	6 ft 0 in (1.83 m)	Sr	Northview	Sylvania, OH
C	55	Angela Perry	6 ft 2 in (1.88 m)	So	Rochester	Rochester, IL

Head coach

- Robyn Fralick (Davidson)

Assistant coach(es)

- Kim Cameron (Michigan Tech)
- Karmen Graham (Northern Kentucky)
- Joel Whymer (Grand Valley State)

Legend

- (C) Team captain
- (S) Suspended
- (I) Ineligible
- (W) Walk-on
- Injured
- Current redshirt

Roster

== Schedule ==
Date time, TV	Rank^{#}	Opponent^{#}	Result	Record	Site (attendance) city, state
Non-conference regular season
Nov 6, 2018*; 7:00 pm		at Michigan State	L 69–99	0–1	Berslin Center (4,278); East Lansing, MI
Nov 13, 2018*; 6:00 pm, ESPN+		Marshall	W 99–76	1–1	Stroh Center (1,521); Bowling Green, OH
Nov 17, 2018*; 2:00 pm, ESPN+		Robert Morris	W 61–60	2–1	Stroh Center (1,384); Bowling Green, OH
Nov 20, 2018*; 11:00 am, ESPN+		Loyola–Chicago	W 88–74	3–1	Stroh Center (4,144); Bowling Green, OH
Nov 23, 2018*; 2:00 pm		at Coastal Carolina; Coastal Carolina Thanksgiving Classic	L 80–81	3–2	HTC Center (247); Conway, SC
Nov 25, 2018*; 11:30 am		vs. Mercer; Coastal Carolina Thanksgiving Classic	L 63–76	3–3	HTC Center (106); Conway, SC
Nov 29, 2018*; 11:30 am		at Xavier	L 49–65	3–4	Cintas Center (3,628); Cincinnati, OH
Dec 8, 2018*; 2:00 pm, ESPN3		at Canisius	W 74–53	4–4	Koessler Athletic Center (706); Buffalo, NY
Dec 17, 2018*; 7:00 pm, ESPN3		Detroit Mercy	W 79–73	5–4	Stroh Center (1,611); Bowling Green, OH
Dec 21, 2018*; 6:00 pm, ESPN3		at Valparaiso	W 79–72	6–4	Athletics–Recreation Center (402); Valparaiso, IN
Dec 30, 2018*; 5:00 pm, WBGU-TV		Davis & Elkins	W 63–28	7–4	Stroh Center (2,490); Bowling Green, OH
MAC regular season
Jan 5, 2019; 2:00 pm, ESPN3		Western Michigan	L 82–84	7–5 (0–1)	Stroh Center (1,465); Bowling Green, OH
Jan 9, 2019; 11:00 am, ESPN+		at Ball State	L 70–77	7–6 (0–2)	Worthen Arena (2,112); Muncie, IN
Jan 12, 2019; 2:00 pm, ESPN+		at Akron	L 71–74	7–7 (0–3)	James A. Rhodes Arena (828); Akron, OH
Jan 16, 2019; 7:00 pm, ESPN+		Northern Illinois	L 52–66	7–8 (0–4)	Stroh Center (1,408); Bowling Green, OH
Jan 19, 2019; 2:00 pm, ESPN3		Toledo	L 65–69	7–9 (0–5)	Stroh Center (2,467); Bowling Green, OH
Jan 23, 2019; 7:00 pm, ESPN+		at Eastern Michigan	L 74–81	7–10 (0–6)	Convocation Center (1,180); Ypsilanti, MI
Jan 26, 2019; 2:00 pm, ESPN+		Ohio	L 79–82	7–11 (0–7)	Stroh Center (1,435); Bowling Green, OH
Feb 2, 2019; 2:00 pm, ESPN3		at Toledo	L 56–76	7–12 (0–8)	Savage Arena (4,757); Toledo, OH
Feb 6, 2019; 7:00 pm, ESPN+		at Northern Illinois	L 47–88	7–13 (0–9)	Convocation Center (302); DeKalb, IL
Feb 9, 2019; 2:00 pm, ESPN3		Miami (OH)	L 75–82	7–14 (0–10)	Stroh Center (1,376); Bowling Green, OH
Feb 13, 2019; 7:00 pm, ESPN+		Buffalo	W 78–72	8–14 (1–10)	Stroh Center (1,154); Bowling Green, OH
Feb 16, 2019; 7:00 pm, ESPN+		at Kent State	L 73–77	8–15 (1–11)	MAC Center (1,660); Kent, OH
Feb 20, 2019; 7:00 pm, ESPN+		Central Michigan; Rescheduled from January 30	L 54–92	8–16 (1–12)	Stroh Center (1,163); Bowling Green, OH
Feb 23, 2019; 7:00 pm, ESPN3		at Miami (OH)	L 62–75	8–17 (1–13)	Millett Hall (2,876); Oxford, OH
Feb 27, 2019; 7:00 pm, ESPN+		Akron	L 73–83	8–18 (1–14)	Stroh Center (1,208); Bowling Green, OH
Mar 2, 2019; 1:00 pm, ESPN3		Kent State	W 62–49	9–18 (2–14)	Stroh Center (1,928); Bowling Green, OH
Mar 6, 2019; 7:00 pm, ESPN+		at Buffalo	L 61–75	9–19 (2–15)	Alumni Arena (1,764); Amherst, NY
Mar 9, 2019; 1:00 pm, ESPN+		at Ohio	L 68–76	9–20 (2–16)	Convocation Center (648); Athens, OH
MAC Women's Tournament
Mar 11, 2019; 7:00 pm, ESPN+	(12)	at (5) Kent State; First Round	L 62–86	9–21	MAC Center (1,323); Kent, OH
*Non-conference game. ^{#}Rankings from AP Poll. (#) Tournament seedings in parentheses. All times are in Eastern Time.

== See also ==
2018–19 Bowling Green Falcons men's basketball team
