= 2018–19 Akron Zips women's basketball team =

Intercollegiate basketball season

2018–19 Akron Zips women's basketball

WBI, First Round
- Conference: Mid-American Conference
- East Division
- Record: 16–15 (7–11 MAC)
- Head coach: Melissa Jackson (1st season)
- Assistant coaches: Colleen Day; Kevin McManaman; Brianna Sanders
- Home arena: James A. Rhodes Arena

2018–19 Mid-American Conference women's basketball standings
	Conf.				Overall
Team	W		L	PCT	W		L	PCT
East
Ohio	14	–	4	.778	30	–	6	.833
Miami (OH)	13	–	5	.722	23	–	9	.719
Buffalo †	12	–	6	.667	24	–	10	.706
Kent State	11	–	7	.611	20	–	13	.606
Akron	7	–	11	.389	16	–	15	.516
Bowling Green	2	–	16	.111	9	–	21	.300
West
Central Michigan	15	–	3	.833	25	–	8	.758
Toledo	11	–	7	.611	21	–	12	.636
Northern Illinois	10	–	8	.556	19	–	13	.594
Eastern Michigan	6	–	12	.333	14	–	17	.452
Western Michigan	4	–	14	.222	10	–	20	.333
Ball State	3	–	15	.167	8	–	23	.258
† 2019 MAC tournament winner

The 2018–19 Akron Zips women's basketball team represented the University of Akron during the 2018–19 NCAA Division I women's basketball season. The Zips, led by first-year head coach Melissa Jackson, played their home games at the James A. Rhodes Arena as members of the East Division of the Mid-American Conference (MAC). They finished the season 16–15, 7–11 in MAC play, to finish in fifth place in the East Division. They lost in the first round of the MAC women's tournament to Eastern Washington. They received an invite to the WBI where they lost in the first round to Tennessee Tech.

== Roster ==
2018–19 Akron Zips women's basketball team
Players
Coaches

Pos.	#	Name	Height	Year	Previous school	Hometown
G	1	Kendall Miller	5 ft 9 in (1.75 m)	Fr	St. Vincent-St. Mary	Akron, OH
G	2	Alyssa Clay	5 ft 9 in (1.75 m)	Jr	Pike	Indianapolis, IN
G	3	Shaunay Edmonds	5 ft 4 in (1.63 m)	Jr	Seton LaSalle	Pittsburgh, PA
F	5	Haliegh Reinoehl	6 ft 1 in (1.85 m)	Jr	Westfield	Westfield, IN
G	11	Megan Sefcik	5 ft 10 in (1.78 m)	RS Sr	Austintown Fitch	Austintown, OH
G	12	Shayna Harmon	5 ft 9 in (1.75 m)	Jr	Teays Valley	Ashville, OH
G	13	Kynnedy Azubike	5 ft 10 in (1.78 m)	So	Africentric	Columbus, OH
G	20	Gabrielle Brown-Mitchell	5 ft 7 in (1.7 m)	Fr	Solon	Solon, OH
F	24	Caitlin Vari	6 ft 1 in (1.85 m)	Jr	Revere	Richfield, OH
F	30	Triniti Lee	6 ft 1 in (1.85 m)	Fr	Canton McKinley	Canton, OH
F	30	Colleen Neitzel	6 ft 1 in (1.85 m)	Fr	Saint Joseph Academy	Rocky River, OH
F	34	Fredniqua Walker	6 ft 1 in (1.85 m)	Jr	Shaw	Cleveland, OH

Head coach

- Melissa Jackson (Richmond)

Assistant coach(es)

- Colleen Day (Miami (OH))
- Kevin McManaman (Saint Mary's (MN))
- Brianna Sanders (Ohio State)

Legend

- (C) Team captain
- (S) Suspended
- (I) Ineligible
- (W) Walk-on
- Injured
- Current redshirt

Roster
Last update: June 10, 2024

== Schedule ==
Date time, TV	Rank^{#}	Opponent^{#}	Result	Record	Site (attendance) city, state
Exhibition
November 8, 2018*; 7:00 p.m.		Rochester College	W 86–45		James A. Rhodes Arena; Akron, OH
Non-conference regular season
November 13, 2018*; 5:30 p.m.		at North Carolina A&T	W 49–36	1–0	Corbett Sports Center (789); Greensboro, NC
November 17, 2018*; 3:00 p.m.		vs. Oakland; Kent State Classic	W 85–65	2–0	MAC Center (469); Kent, OH
November 18, 2018*; 11:00 a.m.		vs. Northern Kentucky; Kent State Classic	W 77–60	3–0	MAC Center (318); Kent, OH
November 28, 2018*; 7:00 p.m., ESPN3		at Youngstown State	L 61–72	3–1	Beeghly Center (1,430); Youngstown, OH
December 1, 2018*; 2:00 p.m., ESPN+		Eastern Kentucky	W 63–54	4–1	James A. Rhodes Arena (516); Akron, OH
December 5, 2018*; 10:30 a.m., ESPN+		St. Bonaventure	W 67–58	5–1	James A. Rhodes Arena (1,652); Akron, OH
December 8, 2018*; 2:00 p.m., ESPN+		Butler	L 47–63	5–2	James A. Rhodes Arena (565); Akron, OH
December 16, 2018*; 2:00 p.m., ESPN+		Canisius	W 62–53	6–2	James A. Rhodes Arena (631); Akron, OH
December 20, 2018*; 8:00 p.m.		vs. Jackson State; Las Vegas Holiday Hoops Classic	W 74–57	7–2	South Point Arena; Enterprise, NV
December 21, 2018*; 8:00 p.m.		vs. UTEP; Las Vegas Holiday Hoops Classic	W 64–57	8–2	South Point Arena; Enterprise, NV
December 29, 2018*; 2:00 p.m.		Malone	W 63–44	9–2	James A. Rhodes Arena (555); Akron, OH
MAC regular season
January 5, 2019; 1:00 p.m., ESPN3		at Central Michigan	L 71–94	9–3 (0–1)	McGuirk Arena (2,188); Mount Pleasant, MI
January 9, 2019; 7:00 p.m., ESPN+		at Western Michigan	W 72–59	10–3 (1–1)	University Arena (578); Kalamazoo, MI
January 12, 2019; 2:00 p.m., ESPN+		Bowling Green	W 74–71	11–3 (2–1)	James A. Rhodes Arena (828); Akron, OH
January 16, 2019; 7:00 p.m., ESPN+		Eastern Michigan	L 60–72	11–4 (2–2)	James A. Rhodes Arena (568); Akron, OH
January 20, 2019; 3:00 p.m., ESPN3		at Northern Illinois; Rescheduled from January 19	L 59–70	11–5 (2–3)	Convocation Center (917); DeKalb, IL
January 23, 2019; 7:00 p.m., ESPN3		at Buffalo	L 72–91	11–6 (2–4)	Alumni Arena (1,492); Amherst, MA
January 26, 2019; 2:00 p.m., ESPN+		Toledo	W 70–64 ^{OT}	12–6 (3–4)	James A. Rhodes Arena (711); Akron, OH
February 2, 2019; 2:00 p.m., ESPN3		at Kent State	L 58–73	12–7 (3–5)	MAC Center (2,224); Kent, OH
February 6, 2019; 7:00 p.m., ESPN3		at Ohio	L 70–92	12–8 (3–6)	Convocation Center (379); Athens, OH
February 9, 2019; 5:00 p.m., ESPN3		Western Michigan	W 69–62	13–8 (4–6)	James A. Rhodes Arena (455); Akron, OH
February 13, 2019; 7:00 p.m., ESPN+		Ball State	W 91–61	14–8 (5–6)	James A. Rhodes Arena (392); Akron, OH
February 16, 2019; 2:00 p.m., ESPN+		Miami (OH)	L 61–67	14–9 (5–7)	James A. Rhodes Arena (628); Akron, OH
February 20, 2019; 7:00 p.m., ESPN+		at Eastern Michigan	L 60–67	14–10 (5–8)	Convocation Center (1,056); Ypsilanti, MI
February 23, 2019; 7:00 p.m., ESPN3		Buffalo	W 70–59	15–10 (6–8)	James A. Rhodes Arena (479); Akron, OH
February 27, 2019; 7:00 p.m., ESPN+		at Bowling Green	W 83–73	16–10 (7–8)	Stroh Center (1,208); Bowling Green, OH
March 2, 2019; 5:00 p.m., ESPN3		Ohio	L 71–81	16–11 (7–9)	James A. Rhodes Arena (570); Akron, OH
March 6, 2019; 7:00 p.m., ESPN+		Kent State	L 55–65 ^{OT}	16–12 (7–10)	James A. Rhodes Arena (671); Akron, OH
March 9, 2019; 2:00 p.m., ESPN+		at Miami (OH)	L 49–66	16–13 (7–11)	Millett Hall (642); Oxford, OH
MAC women's tournament
March 11, 2019; 5:00 p.m., ESPN+	(8)	(9) Eastern Michigan; First round	L 59–61	16–14	James A. Rhodes Arena (505); Akron, OH
WBI
March 21, 2019*; 7:00 p.m.		at Tennessee Tech; First round	L 59–73	16–15	Eblen Center (1,149); Cookeville, TN
*Non-conference game. ^{#}Rankings from AP poll. (#) Tournament seedings in parentheses. All times are in Eastern.

== See also ==
- 2018–19 Akron Zips men's basketball team
