= 2018–19 Northern Illinois Huskies women's basketball team =

Intercollegiate basketball season

2018–19 Northern Illinois Huskies women's basketball
- Conference: Mid-American Conference
- West Division
- Record: 19–13 (10–8 MAC)
- Head coach: Lisa Carlsen (4th season)
- Assistant coaches: Adam Tandez; John McGinty; Maria Kasza
- Home arena: Convocation Center

2018–19 Mid-American Conference women's basketball standings
	Conf.				Overall
Team	W		L	PCT	W		L	PCT
East
Ohio	14	–	4	.778	30	–	6	.833
Miami (OH)	13	–	5	.722	23	–	9	.719
Buffalo †	12	–	6	.667	24	–	10	.706
Kent State	11	–	7	.611	20	–	13	.606
Akron	7	–	11	.389	16	–	15	.516
Bowling Green	2	–	16	.111	9	–	21	.300
West
Central Michigan	15	–	3	.833	25	–	8	.758
Toledo	11	–	7	.611	21	–	12	.636
Northern Illinois	10	–	8	.556	19	–	13	.594
Eastern Michigan	6	–	12	.333	14	–	17	.452
Western Michigan	4	–	14	.222	10	–	20	.333
Ball State	3	–	15	.167	8	–	23	.258
† 2019 MAC tournament winner

The 2018–19 Northern Illinois Huskies women's basketball team represented Northern Illinois University during the 2018–19 NCAA Division I women's basketball season. The Huskies, led by fourth-year head coach Lisa Carlsen, played their home games at the Convocation Center in DeKalb, Illinois as members of the West Division of the Mid-American Conference. They finished the season 19–13, 10–8 in MAC play to finish in third place in the West division. They advanced to the quarterfinals of the MAC women's tournament where they lost to Ohio. Despite having 19 wins, they were not invited to a postseason tournament.

== Roster ==
2018–19 Northern Illinois Huskies women's basketball team
Players
Coaches

Pos.	#	Name	Height	Year	Previous school	Hometown
G	1	Errin Hodges	6 ft 0 in (1.83 m)	So	Central	Evansville, IN
G	3	Gabby Nikitiniate	5 ft 1 in (1.55 m)	So	Coopers School	Orpington, England
G/F	4	Courtney Woods	6 ft 0 in (1.83 m)	Sr	St. Margaret's Anglican School	Brisbane, Australia
G	5	Ninni Salmi	6 ft 2 in (1.88 m)	RS Jr	Mäkelänrinne; San Francisco	Kauhajoki, Finland
F	12	Riley Blackwell	6 ft 1 in (1.85 m)	So	Plainfield	Plainfield, IN
F	14	Mikayla Brandon	6 ft 1 in (1.85 m)	Fr	Bradley-Bourbonnais	Bourbonnais, IL
G	21	Mikayla Voigt	5 ft 9 in (1.75 m)	Sr	Kettle Moraine Lutheran	Slinger, WI
G	22	Janae Poisson	5 ft 8 in (1.73 m)	RS So	Marian Catholic	Matteson, IL
G	23	Myia Starks	5 ft 4 in (1.63 m)	Jr	Neuqua Valley	Oswego, IL
G	24	Paulina Castro	5 ft 8 in (1.73 m)	RS So	Harvest Christian	Elgin, IL
F	31	Christina Britter	6 ft 1 in (1.85 m)	Fr	Dunlap	Dunlap, IL
F	32	Abby Woollacott	6 ft 2 in (1.88 m)	Jr	Rockford Lutheran	Rockford, IL
F	34	Ally May	6 ft 2 in (1.88 m)	RS Jr	Arrowhead	Hartland, WI

Head coach

- Lisa Carlsen (Northwest Missouri State)

Assistant coach(es)

- John McGinty (Iowa)
- Adam Tandez (Marquette)
- Maria Kasza (Michigan Tech)

Legend

- (C) Team captain
- (S) Suspended
- (I) Ineligible
- (W) Walk-on
- Injured
- Current redshirt

Roster

== Schedule and results ==
Date time, TV	Rank^{#}	Opponent^{#}	Result	Record	Site (attendance) city, state
Exhibition
Nov 3, 2018*; 1:00 pm		St. Francis (IL)	W 59–55		Convocation Center (224); DeKalb, IL
Non-conference regular season
Nov 8, 2018*; 6:00 pm, ESPN+		Yale; Preseason WNIT First Round	W 89–80	1–0	Convocation Center (615); DeKalb, IL
Nov 11, 2018*; 2:00 pm		at Iowa State; Preseason WNIT Quarterfinals	L 60–70	1–1	Hilton Coliseum (9,266); Ames, IA
Nov 18, 2018*; 2:00 pm, ESPN+		Northern Iowa; Preseason WNIT Consolation round	W 70–59	2–1	Convocation Center (344); DeKalb, IL
Nov 25, 2018*; 2:00 pm		at Indiana	L 73–91	2–2	Simon Skjodt Assembly Hall (3,415); Bloomington, IN
Nov 28, 2018*; 11:00 am, ESPN+		North Dakota State	W 81–63	3–2	Convocation Center (1,202); DeKalb, IL
Dec 1, 2018*; 3:00 pm		at Montana; 38th Lady Griz Classic semifinals	L 70–86	3–3	Dahlberg Arena (2,816); Missoula, MT
Dec 2, 2018*; 1:00 pm		vs. Nevada; 38th Lady Griz Classic 3rd place game	W 98–69	4–3	Dahlberg Arena (301); Missoula, MT
Dec 7, 2018*; 7:00 pm		at Southern Illinois; Compass Challenge	L 73–82	4–4	SIU Arena (560); Carbondale, IL
Dec 8, 2018*; 1:00 pm		vs. Western Illinois; Compass Challenge	W 86–61	5–4	SIU Arena (100); Carbondale, IL
Dec 17, 2018*; 5:30 pm		Eastern Illinois	W 78–59	6–4	Convocation Center (417); DeKalb, IL
Dec 21, 2018*; 6:00 pm, ESPN3		Chicago State	W 114–52	7–4	Convocation Center (455); DeKalb, IL
Dec 31, 2018*; 1:00 pm, ESPN+		Brown	W 109–102 ^{2OT}	8–4	Convocation Center (411); DeKalb, IL
MAC regular season
Jan 5, 2019; 1:00 pm, ESPN3		Miami (OH)	W 82–71	9–4 (1–0)	Convocation Center (507); DeKalb, IL
Jan 9, 2019; 6:00 pm, ESPN3		at Kent State	L 78–87	9–5 (1–1)	MAC Center (215); Kent, OH
Jan 12, 2019; 1:00 pm, ESPN3		Central Michigan	L 66–89	9–6 (1–2)	Convocation Center (431); DeKalb, IL
Jan 16, 2019; 6:00 pm, ESPN+		at Bowling Green	W 66–52	10–6 (2–2)	Stroh Center (1,408); Bowling Green, OH
Jan 20, 2019; 2:00 pm, ESPN3		Akron; Rescheduled from January 19	W 70–59	11–6 (3–2)	Convocation Center (917); DeKalb, IL
Jan 23, 2019; 6:00 pm, ESPN+		Ohio	L 53–69	11–7 (3–3)	Convocation Center (269); DeKalb, IL
Jan 26, 2019; 1:00 pm, ESPN+		at Buffalo	L 64–93	11–8 (3–4)	Alumni Arena (2,174); Amherst, NY
Feb 2, 2019; 12:00 pm, ESPN3		at Eastern Michigan	W 68–65	12–8 (4–4)	Convocation Center; Ypsilanti, MI
Feb 6, 2019; 6:00 pm, ESPN+		Bowling Green	W 88–47	13–8 (5–4)	Convocation Center (302); DeKalb, IL
Feb 9, 2019; 3:30 pm, ESPN3		at Ball State	W 93–83	14–8 (6–4)	Worthen Arena (1,333); Muncie, IN
Feb 13, 2019; 6:00 pm, ESPN+		at Miami (OH)	L 45–70	14–9 (6–5)	Millett Hall (466); Oxford, OH
Feb 16, 2019; 1:00 pm, ESPN3		Toledo	W 54–52	15–9 (7–5)	Convocation Center (1,305); DeKalb, IL
Feb 18, 2019; 6:00 pm, ESPN3		Western Michigan; Rescheduled from January 30	W 77–64	16–9 (8–5)	Convocation Center (296); DeKalb, IL
Feb 23, 2019; 12:00 pm, ESPN3		at Central Michigan	L 52–76	16–10 (8–6)	McGuirk Arena (2,157); Mount Pleasant, MI
Feb 27, 2019; 6:00 pm, ESPN3		Eastern Michigan	W 70–60	17–10 (9–6)	Convocation Center (367); DeKalb, IL
Mar 2, 2019; 1:00 pm, ESPN3		at Toledo	L 43–54	17–11 (9–7)	Savage Arena (4,119); Toledo, OH
Mar 6, 2019; 6:00 pm, ESPN+		Ball State	L 64–67	17–12 (9–8)	Convocation Center (501); DeKalb, IL
Mar 9, 2019; 1:00 pm, ESPN+		at Western Michigan	W 74–71	18–12 (10–8)	University Arena (594); Kalamazoo, MI
MAC Women's Tournament
Mar 11, 2019; 5:30 pm, ESPN+	(7)	(10) Western Michigan; First Round	W 70–69	19–12	Convocation Center (496); DeKalb, IL
Mar 13, 2019; 4:00 pm, ESPN+	(7)	vs. (2) Ohio; Quarterfinals	L 56–72	19–13	Quicken Loans Arena; Cleveland, OH
*Non-conference game. ^{#}Rankings from AP Poll. (#) Tournament seedings in parentheses. All times are in Eastern Time.

== See also ==
- 2018–19 Northern Illinois Huskies men's basketball team
