= 2018–19 Mid-American Conference women's basketball season =

- League: NCAA Division I
- Sport: Basketball
- Teams: 12

Regular season
- Champions: Central Michigan
- Runners-up: Ohio
- Season MVP: Reyna Frost

Tournament
- Champions: Buffalo
- Runners-up: Ohio
- Finals MVP: Cierra Dillard

Mid-American women's basketball seasons
- 2017–18 2019–20

2018–19 Mid-American Conference women's basketball standings
	Conf.				Overall
Team	W		L	PCT	W		L	PCT
East
Ohio	14	–	4	.778	30	–	6	.833
Miami (OH)	13	–	5	.722	23	–	9	.719
Buffalo †	12	–	6	.667	24	–	10	.706
Kent State	11	–	7	.611	20	–	13	.606
Akron	7	–	11	.389	16	–	15	.516
Bowling Green	2	–	16	.111	9	–	21	.300
West
Central Michigan	15	–	3	.833	25	–	8	.758
Toledo	11	–	7	.611	21	–	12	.636
Northern Illinois	10	–	8	.556	19	–	13	.594
Eastern Michigan	6	–	12	.333	14	–	17	.452
Western Michigan	4	–	14	.222	10	–	20	.333
Ball State	3	–	15	.167	8	–	23	.258
† 2019 MAC tournament winner

The 2018–19 Mid-American Conference women's basketball season began with practices in October 2018, followed by the start of the 2018–19 NCAA Division I women's basketball season in November. Conference play began in January 2019 and concluded in March 2019. Central Michigan won its third straight regular season title with a record of 15–3 by one game over Ohio. Cierra Dillard of Buffalo was named MAC player of the year.

Fourth-seeded Buffalo won the MAC tournament by beating Central Michigan in the semi-finals and Ohio in the final. Central Michigan was given an at large bid as an eight-seed in the Chicago Region of the NCAA tournament where they lost to Michigan State 89–88. Buffalo was the ten-seed in the Albany Region where they defeated Rutgers before losing to the eventual winner of the region Connecticut 84–72 Ohio, Kent State, Miami, and Toledo all qualified for the WNIT. Ohio won three games before losing to Northwestern and reached 30 total wins on the season.

== Preseason awards ==
The preseason coaches' poll and league awards were announced by the league office on October 31, 2018.

=== Preseason women's basketball coaches poll ===
(First place votes in parentheses)

==== East Division ====
1. Buffalo (4) 62
2. Miami (5) 61
3. Ohio (3) 57
4. Kent State 28
5. Bowling Green 27
6. Akron 17

==== West Division ====
1. Central Michigan (12) 72
2. Toledo 52
3. Eastern Michigan 41
4. Northern Illinois 38
5. Ball State 34
6. Western Michigan 15

==== Regular season champion ====
Central Michigan (9), Miami (2), Ohio (1)

==== Tournament champs ====
Central Michigan (8), Buffalo (3), Northern Illinois (1)

=== Honors ===
Honor	Recipient
Preseason All-MAC East	Cierra Dillard, Buffalo, Senior, Guard
Preseason All-MAC East	Summer Hemphill, Buffalo, Junior, Forward
Preseason All-MAC East	Lauren Dickerson, Miami, Junior, Guard
Preseason All-MAC East	Kendall McCoy, Miami, Senior, Guard/Forward
Preseason All-MAC East	Cece Hooks, Ohio, Sophomore, Guard
Preseason All-MAC West	Reyna Frost, Central Michigan, Senior, Forward
Preseason All-MAC West	Presley Hudson, Central Michigan, Senior, Guard
Preseason All-MAC West	Danielle Minott, Eastern Michigan, R-Senior, Guard
Preseason All-MAC West	Courtney Woods, Northern Illinois, Senior, Guard/Forward
Preseason All-MAC West	Kaayla McIntyre, Toledo, Senior, Center

== Postseason ==
=== Postseason awards ===
1. Coach of the Year: Sue Guevara, Central Michigan
2. Player of the Year: Reyna Frost, Central Michigan
3. Freshman of the Year: Erica Johnson, Ohio
4. Defensive Player of the Year: Cece Hooks, Ohio
5. Sixth Man of the Year: Erica Johnson, Ohio

=== Honors ===
Honor	Recipient
Postseason All-MAC First Team	Cierra Dillard, Buffalo
Postseason All-MAC First Team	Reyna Frost, Central Michigan
Postseason All-MAC First Team	Presley Hudson, Central Michigan
Postseason All-MAC First Team	Lauren Dickerson, Miami
Postseason All-MAC First Team	Cece Hooks, Ohio
Postseason All-MAC Second Team	Megan Sefcik, Akron
Postseason All-MAC Second Team	Summer Hemphill, Buffalo
Postseason All-MAC Second Team	Savannah Kluesner, Miami
Postseason All-MAC Second Team	Mikayla Voigt, Northern Illinois
Postseason All-MAC Second Team	Kaayla McIntyre, Toledo
Postseason All-MAC Third Team	Andrea Cecil, Bowling Green
Postseason All-MAC Third Team	Micaela Kelly, Central Michigan
Postseason All-MAC Third Team	Megan Carter, Kent State
Postseason All-MAC Third Team	Amani Burke, Ohio
Postseason All-MAC Third Team	Erica Johnson, Ohio
Postseason All-MAC Honorable Mention	Oshlynn Brown, Ball State
Postseason All-MAC Honorable Mention	Danielle Minott, Eastern Michigan
Postseason All-MAC Honorable Mention	Kendall McCoy, Miami
Postseason All-MAC Honorable Mention	Mikaela Boyd, Toledo
Postseason All-MAC Honorable Mention	Deja Wimby, Western Michigan
All-MAC Defensive Team	Reyna Frost, Central Michigan
All-MAC Defensive Team	Alexa Golden, Kent State
All-MAC Defensive Team	Cece Hooks, Ohio
All-MAC Defensive Team	Kaayla McIntyre, Toledo
All-MAC Defensive Team	Deja Wimby, Western Michigan
All-MAC Freshman Team	Thelma Dis Agustsdottir, Ball State
All-MAC Freshman Team	Morgan McMillen, Bowling Green
All-MAC Freshman Team	Asiah Dingle, Kent State
All-MAC Freshman Team	Lindsey Thall, Kent State
All-MAC Freshman Team	Erica Johnson, Ohio

== See also ==
2018–19 Mid-American Conference men's basketball season
