= 2018–19 Miami RedHawks women's basketball team =

Intercollegiate basketball season

2018–19 Miami RedHawks women's basketball

WNIT, First Round
- Conference: Mid-American Conference
- East Division
- Record: 23–9 (13–5 MAC)
- Head coach: Megan Duffy (2nd season)
- Assistant coaches: Frank Goldsberry; Ke'Sha Blanton; Justine Raterman
- Home arena: Millett Hall

2018–19 Mid-American Conference women's basketball standings
	Conf.				Overall
Team	W		L	PCT	W		L	PCT
East
Ohio	14	–	4	.778	30	–	6	.833
Miami (OH)	13	–	5	.722	23	–	9	.719
Buffalo †	12	–	6	.667	24	–	10	.706
Kent State	11	–	7	.611	20	–	13	.606
Akron	7	–	11	.389	16	–	15	.516
Bowling Green	2	–	16	.111	9	–	21	.300
West
Central Michigan	15	–	3	.833	25	–	8	.758
Toledo	11	–	7	.611	21	–	12	.636
Northern Illinois	10	–	8	.556	19	–	13	.594
Eastern Michigan	6	–	12	.333	14	–	17	.452
Western Michigan	4	–	14	.222	10	–	20	.333
Ball State	3	–	15	.167	8	–	23	.258
† 2019 MAC tournament winner

The 2018–19 Miami RedHawks women's basketball team represented Miami University during the 2018–19 NCAA Division I women's basketball season. The RedHawks, led by second year head coach Megan Duffy, played their home games at Millett Hall, as members of the East Division of the Mid-American Conference. They finished the season 23–9, 13–5 in MAC play to finish in second place in the East Division. They advanced to the semifinals of the MAC women's tournament, where they lost to Ohio. They received an at-large bid to the Women's National Invitation Tournament, where they lost to Western Kentucky in the first round.

== Roster ==
2018–19 Miami RedHawks women's basketball team
Players
Coaches

Pos.	#	Name	Height	Year	Previous school	Hometown
G	1	Alexis Straw	5 ft 9 in (1.75 m)	Fr	Lebanon	Lebanon, OH
G	3	Nia Clark	5 ft 9 in (1.75 m)	Fr	Ben Davis	Indianapolis, IN
G	4	Vannessa Garrelts	5 ft 4 in (1.63 m)	Fr	Marian Central Catholic	Spring Grove, IL
F	10	Kristen Levering	6 ft 2 in (1.88 m)	Sr	Olentangy Liberty	Powell, OH
G	11	Kennedy Taylor	5 ft 9 in (1.75 m)	Fr	Bishop Hartley	Columbus, OH
G	13	Lauren Dickerson	5 ft 3 in (1.6 m)	Jr	Lawrence North	Indianapolis, IN
G	21	Leah Purvis	5 ft 6 in (1.68 m)	Sr	The Buckley School	Los Angeles, CA
G	23	Kenzie Schmitz	5 ft 10 in (1.78 m)	So	Germantown	Germantown, WI
G	24	Baleigh Reid	5 ft 10 in (1.78 m)	RS Sr	Twinsburg	Twinsburg, OH
F	32	Savannah Kluesner	6 ft 2 in (1.88 m)	Jr	Lutheran	St. Charles, MO
G/F	35	Abbey Hoff	6 ft 0 in (1.83 m)	Jr	Incarnate Word Academy	St. Peters, MO
G/F	40	Kendall McCoy	6 ft 0 in (1.83 m)	Sr	Sylvania Northview	Sylvania, OH
F	45	Tihanna Fulton	6 ft 0 in (1.83 m)	Fr	Mason	Mason, OH
F	54	Kelly McLaughlin	6 ft 3 in (1.91 m)	So	St. Joseph's Academy	St. Louis, MO

Head coach

- Megan Duffy (Notre Dame)

Assistant coach(es)

- Frank Goldsberry (Ball State)
- Ke'Sha Blanton (Toledo)
- Justine Raterman (Dayton)

Legend

- (C) Team captain
- (S) Suspended
- (I) Ineligible
- (W) Walk-on
- Injured
- Current redshirt

Roster

== Schedule ==
Date time, TV	Rank^{#}	Opponent^{#}	Result	Record	Site (attendance) city, state
Exhibition
Nov 4, 2018*; 2:00 pm		Tiffin	W 93–59		Millett Hall; Oxford, OH
Non-conference regular season
Nov 9, 2018*; 7:00 pm, ESPN3		at Canisius	W 62–59	1–0	Koessler Athletic Center (1,228); Buffalo, NY
Nov 13, 2018*; 7:00 pm, ESPN+		Eastern Kentucky	W 60–44	2–0	Millett Hall (227); Oxford, OH
Nov 16, 2018*; 7:00 pm, ESPN+		at Detroit Mercy	W 78–59	3–0	Calihan Hall (324); Detroit, MI
Nov 20, 2018*; 12:00 pm, ESPN+		High Point	W 68–55	4–0	Millett Hall (1,052); Oxford, OH
Nov 26, 2018*; 7:00 pm		at No. 5 Louisville	L 73–95	4–1	KFC Yum! Center (7,544); Louisville, KY
Dec 1, 2018*; 12:00 pm, ESPN+		at UIC	W 65–56	5–1	Credit Union 1 Arena (686); Chicago, IL
Dec 5, 2018*; 7:00 pm		Cincinnati	W 78–65	6–1	Millett Hall (571); Oxford, OH
Dec 8, 2018*; 2:00 pm, ESPN3		at Valparaiso	W 68–47	7–1	Athletics–Recreation Center (589); Valparaiso, IN
Dec 16, 2018*; 2:00 pm		at Florida A&M	L 56–57	7–2	Teaching Gym (350); Tallahassee, FL
Dec 18, 2018*; 6:15 pm, ESPN+		at Jacksonville State	W 58–41	8–2	Pete Mathews Coliseum (315); Jacksonville, AL
Dec 29, 2018*; 2:00 pm		Ohio Dominican	W 74–29	9–2	Millett Hall (398); Oxford, OH
MAC regular season
Jan 5, 2019; 2:00 pm, ESPN3		at Northern Illinois	L 71–82	9–3 (0–1)	Convocation Center (507); DeKalb, IL
Jan 9, 2019; 7:00 pm, ESPN+		Toledo	W 65–64	10–3 (1–1)	Millett Hall (275); Oxford, OH
Jan 12, 2019; 2:00 pm, ESPN+		Buffalo	L 59–66	10–4 (1–2)	Millett Hall (315); Oxford, OH
Jan 16, 2019; 7:00 pm, ESPN+		at Central Michigan	W 70–67	11–4 (2–2)	McGuirk Arena (2,054); Mount Pleasant, MI
Jan 19, 2019; 1:00 pm, ESPN3		Ball State	W 60–57	12–4 (3–2)	Millett Hall (317); Oxford, OH
Jan 26, 2019; 1:00 pm, ESPN3		Kent State	W 79–63	13–4 (4–2)	Millett Hall (770); Oxford, OH
Jan 30, 2019; 7:00 pm, ESPN+		at Ohio	W 67–61	14–4 (5–2)	Convocation Center (446); Athens, OH
Feb 2, 2019; 2:00 pm, ESPN3		at Western Michigan	W 81–62	15–4 (6–2)	University Arena (1,012); Kalamazoo, MI
Feb 6, 2019; 7:00 pm, ESPN+		Eastern Michigan	W 63–58	16–4 (7–2)	Millett Hall (396); Oxford, OH
Feb 9, 2019; 2:00 pm, ESPN3		at Bowling Green	W 82–75	17–4 (8–2)	Stroh Center (1,376); Bowling Green, OH
Feb 13, 2019; 7:00 pm, ESPN+		Northern Illinois	W 70–45	18–4 (9–2)	Millett Hall (466); Oxford, OH
Feb 16, 2019; 2:00 pm, ESPN3		at Akron	W 67–61	19–4 (10–2)	James A. Rhodes Arena (628); Akron, OH
Feb 20, 2019; 7:00 pm, ESPN+		at Toledo	W 65–56	20–4 (11–2)	Savage Arena (3,704); Toledo, OH
Feb 23, 2019; 2:00 pm, ESPN+		Bowling Green	W 75–62	21–4 (12–2)	Millett Hall (2,876); Oxford, OH
Feb 27, 2019; 7:00 pm, ESPN+		at Kent State	L 58–67	21–5 (12–3)	MAC Center (1,342); Kent, OH
Mar 2, 2019; 2:00 pm, ESPN3		at Buffalo	L 61–86	21–6 (12–4)	Alumni Arena (3,509); Amherst, NY
Mar 6, 2019; 7:00 pm, ESPN+		Ohio	L 66–70	21–7 (12–5)	Millett Hall (622); Oxford, OH
Mar 9, 2019; 2:00 pm, ESPN+		Akron	W 66–49	22–7 (13–5)	Millett Hall (642); Oxford, OH
MAC Women's Tournament
Mar 13, 2019; 7:30 pm, ESPN+	(3)	vs. (6) Toledo; Quarterfinals	W 72–54	23–7	Quicken Loans Arena; Cleveland, OH
Mar 15, 2019; 1:30 pm, ESPN+	(3)	vs. (2) Ohio; Semifinals	L 48–74	23–8	Quicken Loans Arena; Cleveland, OH
WNIT
Mar 21, 2019*; 7:00 pm		Western Kentucky; First Round	L 63–67	23–9	Millett Hall (338); Oxford, OH
*Non-conference game. ^{#}Rankings from AP Poll. (#) Tournament seedings in parentheses. All times are in Eastern Time.

== Rankings ==
2018–19 NCAA Division I women's basketball rankings

Regular season polls
Poll	Pre- Season	Week 2	Week 3	Week 4	Week 5	Week 6	Week 7	Week 8	Week 9	Week 10	Week 11	Week 12	Week 13	Week 14	Week 15	Week 16	Week 17	Week 18	Week 19	Final
AP																	RV			N/A
Coaches																				

Legend
	Increase in ranking
	Decrease in ranking
	No change
(RV)	Received votes
(NR)	Not ranked

== See also ==
2018–19 Miami RedHawks men's basketball team
