= 2018–19 Ohio Bobcats women's basketball team =

Intercollegiate basketball season

2018–19 Ohio Bobcats women's basketball

MAC East Division Champions

WNIT, Quarterfinals
- Conference: Mid-American Conference
- East Division
- Record: 30–6 (14–4 MAC)
- Head coach: Bob Boldon (6th season)
- Assistant coaches: Tavares Jackson; Steph Haas; Marwan Miller
- Home arena: Convocation Center

2018–19 Mid-American Conference women's basketball standings
	Conf.				Overall
Team	W		L	PCT	W		L	PCT
East
Ohio	14	–	4	.778	30	–	6	.833
Miami (OH)	13	–	5	.722	23	–	9	.719
Buffalo †	12	–	6	.667	24	–	10	.706
Kent State	11	–	7	.611	20	–	13	.606
Akron	7	–	11	.389	16	–	15	.516
Bowling Green	2	–	16	.111	9	–	21	.300
West
Central Michigan	15	–	3	.833	25	–	8	.758
Toledo	11	–	7	.611	21	–	12	.636
Northern Illinois	10	–	8	.556	19	–	13	.594
Eastern Michigan	6	–	12	.333	14	–	17	.452
Western Michigan	4	–	14	.222	10	–	20	.333
Ball State	3	–	15	.167	8	–	23	.258
† 2019 MAC tournament winner

The 2018–19 Ohio Bobcats women's basketball team represented Ohio University during the 2018–19 NCAA Division I women's basketball season. The Bobcats, led by sixth-year head coach Bob Boldon, played their home games at the Convocation Center in Athens, Ohio as a member of the Mid-American Conference.

They finished the season 30–6, 14–2 in MAC play to win the MAC East Division. They advanced to the championship game of the MAC women's tournament, where they lost to Buffalo. They received an automatic bid to the WNIT, where they defeated High Point, Middle Tennessee and Western Kentucky in the first, second and third rounds respectively, before losing to Northwestern in the quarterfinals. They finished with 30 wins, the most in school history.

== Offseason ==
=== Coaching staff changes ===
==== Coaching departures ====
Coaching departures
Name	Alma mater	Previous position	New position
Mary Evans	Georgia Southern University	Assistant coach	Head coach (Valparaiso)

==== Coaching additions ====
Coaching additions
Name	Alma mater	Previous position	New position
Steph Haas	Florida Gulf Coast University	Video coordinator (Florida Gulf Coast)	Assistant coach

=== Departures ===
Departures
Name	Number	Pos.	Height	Year	Hometown	Reason for departure
Taylor Agler	0	G	5'9"	Redshirt senior	Westerville, Ohio	Graduated, exhausted eligibility
Alexis Stover	5	F	5'11"	Freshman	Westerville, Ohio	Transferred to Wright State
Meche'la Cobb	24	G	6'0"	Redshirt freshman	New Albany, Ohio	

=== Incoming transfers ===
Incoming transfers
Name	Number	Pos.	Height	Year	Hometown	Previous school
Caitlyn Kroll	5	G	5'10"	Redshirt sophomore	Bridgeport, Ohio	Transferred from Saint Francis (PA). Had three years of eligibility remaining.

=== 2018 recruiting class ===
Recruiting class
Name	Number	Pos.	Height	High school	Hometown
Abby Garnett	20	F	6'1	Golden	Golden, Colorado
Deesh Beck	32	F	5'9	Grand Rapids Christian	Grand Rapids, Michigan
Alexandra Antonova	35	F	6'2	Teays Valley	Moscow, Russia

== Preseason ==
The preseason coaches' poll and league awards were announced by the league office on October 31, 2018. Ohio was picked third in the MAC East.

=== Preseason women's basketball coaches poll ===
(First place votes in parentheses)

==== East Division ====
1. Buffalo (4) 62
2. Miami (5) 61
3. Ohio (3) 57
4. Kent State 28
5. Bowling Green 27
6. Akron 17

==== West Division ====
1. Central Michigan (12) 72
2. Toledo 52
3. Eastern Michigan 41
4. Northern Illinois 38
5. Ball State 34
6. Western Michigan 15

==== Regular season champion ====
Central Michigan (9), Miami (2), Ohio (1)

==== Tournament champs ====
Central Michigan (8), Buffalo (3), Northern Illinois (1)

=== Preseason All-MAC ===
Preseason All-MAC teams
Team	Player	Position	Year
Preseason All-MAC East	Cece Hooks	G	So.

== Roster ==
2018–19 Ohio Bobcats women's basketball team
Players
Coaches

Pos.	#	Name	Height	Year	Previous school	Hometown
G	1	Cece Hooks	5 ft 8 in (1.73 m)	So	Thurgood Marshall	Dayton, OH
G	2	Katie Barker	5 ft 10 in (1.78 m)	RS Jr	Cary-Grove	Cary, IL
G	3	Amani Burke	5 ft 9 in (1.75 m)	RS Jr	Eastmoor Academy	Columbus, OH
F	4	Erica Johnson	5 ft 11 in (1.8 m)	RS Fr	Mansfield Senior	Mansfield, OH
G	5	Caitlyn Kroll	5 ft 10 in (1.78 m)	RS So	Bridgeport; Saint Francis (PA)	Bridgeport, OH
G	10	Dominique Doseck	5 ft 8 in (1.73 m)	Sr	Athens	Athens, OH
F	13	Olivia Bower	6 ft 1 in (1.85 m)	Sr	Conotton Valley	Bowerston, OH
G	15	Kaylee Bambule	5 ft 8 in (1.73 m)	RS Fr	Montini Catholic	Plainfield, IL
F	20	Abby Garnett	6 ft 1 in (1.85 m)	Fr	Golden	Golden, CO
F	21	Hannah Thome	6 ft 1 in (1.85 m)	RS Jr	Chagrin Falls	Chagrin Falls, OH
G	25	Hunter Rogan (W)	5 ft 8 in (1.73 m)	So	Urbana	Urbana, OH
F	32	Deesh Beck	5 ft 9 in (1.75 m)	Fr	Grand Rapids Christian	Grand Rapids, MI
F	35	Alexandra Antonova	6 ft 2 in (1.88 m)	Fr	Teays Valley	Moscow, Russia
F	41	Gabby Burris	5 ft 11 in (1.8 m)	So	Liberty Union	Baltimore, OH
F	54	Kendall Jessing	6 ft 0 in (1.83 m)	Sr	Sylvania Northview	Sylvania, OH

Head coach

- Bob Boldon (Walsh)

Assistant coach(es)

- Tavares Jackson (Minnesota)
- Steph Haas (Florida Gulf Coast)
- Marwan Miller (Franklin (OH))

Legend

- (C) Team captain
- (S) Suspended
- (I) Ineligible
- (W) Walk-on
- Injured
- Current redshirt

Roster

== Schedule ==
Date time, TV	Rank^{#}	Opponent^{#}	Result	Record	Site (attendance) city, state
Exhibition
Nov 3, 2018*; 1:00 pm		Walsh	W 90–62		Convocation Center; Athens, OH
Non-conference regular season
Nov 11, 2018*; 1:00 pm, ESPN+		UNC Wilmington	W 95–72	1–0	Convocation Center (449); Athens, OH
Nov 15, 2018*; 11:00 am, ESPN+		Binghamton	W 86–49	2–0	Convocation Center (2,167); Athens, OH
Nov 18, 2018*; 1:00 pm, ESPN+		Eastern Kentucky	W 100–60	3–0	Convocation Center (414); Athens, OH
Nov 23, 2018*; 3:00 pm		vs. St. Bonaventure; Denver Thanksgiving Classic	W 76–62	4–0	Hamilton Gymnasium; Denver, CO
Nov 24, 2018*; 3:00 pm		vs. Lamar; Denver Thanksgiving Classic	W 87–62	5–0	Hamilton Gymnasium; Denver, CO
Dec 1, 2018*; 1:00 pm, ESPN+		Cleveland State	W 72–64	6–0	Convocation Center (548); Athens, OH
Dec 5, 2018*; 7:00 pm, ESPN+		Purdue	W 80–73	7–0	Convocation Center (591); Athens, OH
Dec 8, 2018*; 1:00 pm, ESPN3		Coppin State	W 87–62	8–0	Convocation Center (404); Athens, OH
Dec 16, 2018*; 2:00 pm, ESPN+		at IUPUI	W 73–66	9–0	The Jungle (311); Indianapolis, IN
Dec 22, 2018*; 2:00 pm, ESPN+		at Richmond	W 109–58	10–0	Robins Center (505); Richmond, VA
Dec 29, 2018*; 2:00 pm		at American	W 77–67	11–0	Bender Arena (334); Washington, D.C.
MAC regular season
Jan 5, 2019; 2:00 pm, ESPN3		at Buffalo	W 74–71 ^{OT}	12–0 (1–0)	Alumni Arena (2,116); Amherst, NY
Jan 9, 2019; 7:00 pm, ESPN+		Central Michigan	L 70–88	12–1 (1–1)	Convocation Center (866); Athens, OH
Jan 12, 2019; 2:30 pm, ESPN3		at Ball State	W 90–75	13–1 (2–1)	Worthen Arena (4,076); Muncie, IN
Jan 16, 2019; 7:00 pm, ESPN3		Kent State	W 83–81	14–1 (3–1)	Convocation Center (450); Athens, OH
Jan 19, 2019; 1:00 pm, ESPN3		Eastern Michigan	W 85–44	15–1 (4–1)	Convocation Center (648); Athens, OH
Jan 23, 2019; 7:00 pm, ESPN+		at Northern Illinois	W 69–53	16–1 (5–1)	Convocation Center (269); DeKalb, IL
Jan 26, 2019; 2:00 pm, ESPN+		at Bowling Green	W 82–79	17–1 (6–1)	Stroh Center (1,435); Bowling Green, OH
Jan 30, 2019; 7:00 pm, ESPN+		Miami (OH)	L 61–67	17–2 (6–2)	Convocation Center (446); Athens, OH
Feb 2, 2019; 1:00 pm, ESPN3		Ball State	W 94–62	18–2 (7–2)	Convocation Center; Athens, OH
Feb 6, 2019; 7:00 pm, ESPN3		Akron	W 92–70	19–2 (8–2)	Convocation Center (379); Athens, OH
Feb 9, 2019; 1:00 pm, ESPN3		at Central Michigan	W 78–75	20–2 (9–2)	McGuirk Arena (2,152); Mount Pleasant, MI
Feb 13, 2019; 7:00 pm, ESPN+		at Toledo	L 50–76	20–3 (9–3)	Savage Arena (3,364); Toledo, OH
Feb 16, 2019; 1:00 pm, ESPN3		Western Michigan	W 70–56	21–3 (10–3)	Convocation Center (729); Athens, OH
Feb 23, 2019; 2:00 pm, ESPN3		at Kent State	W 69–67	22–3 (11–3)	MAC Center (1,208); Kent, OH
Feb 27, 2019; 7:00 pm, ESPN+		Buffalo	L 43–73	22–4 (11–4)	Convocation Center; Athens, OH
Mar 2, 2019; 5:00 pm, ESPN3		at Akron	W 81–71	23–4 (12–4)	James A. Rhodes Arena (570); Akron, OH
Mar 6, 2019; 7:00 pm, ESPN+		at Miami (OH)	W 70–66	24–4 (13–4)	Millett Hall (622); Oxford, OH
Mar 9, 2019; 1:00 pm, ESPN+		Bowling Green	W 76–68	25–4 (14–4)	Convocation Center (648); Athens, OH
MAC Tournament
Mar 13, 2019; 5:00 pm, ESPN+	(2)	vs. (7) Northern Illinois; Quarterfinals	W 72–56	26–4	Quicken Loans Arena; Cleveland, OH
Mar 15, 2019; 1:30 pm, ESPN+	(2)	vs. (3) Miami (OH); Semifinals	W 74–48	27–4	Quicken Loans Arena; Cleveland, OH
Mar 16, 2019; 11:00 am, CBSSN	(2)	vs. (4) Buffalo; Championship Game	L 61–77	27–5	Quicken Loans Arena (2,765); Cleveland, OH
WNIT
Mar 21, 2019*; 7:00 pm		High Point; First Round	W 81–74	28–5	Convocation Center (567); Athens, OH
Mar 24, 2019*; 2:00 pm		Middle Tennessee; Second Round	W 59–57	29–5	Convocation Center (867); Athens, OH
Mar 28, 2019*; 7:00 pm		Western Kentucky; Third Round	W 68–60	30–5	Convocation Center (1,491); Athens, OH
Mar 30, 2019*; 7:00 pm		at Northwestern; Quarterfinals	L 58–61	30–6	Welsh–Ryan Arena (1,031); Evanston, IL
*Non-conference game. ^{#}Rankings from AP Poll. (#) Tournament seedings in parentheses. All times are in Eastern Time.

== Awards and honors ==
=== Weekly awards ===
Weekly award honors
Honors	Player	Position	Date awarded	Source
MAC East Player of the Week	Gabby Burris	F	November 13	
MAC East Player of the Week	Amani Burke	F	December 4	
MAC East Player of the Week	Erica Johnson	F	December 18	
MAC East Player of the Week	Dominique Doseck	G	January 1	
MAC East Player of the Week	Cece Hooks	G	January 8	
MAC East Player of the Week	Erica Johnson	F	January 29	
MAC East Player of the Week	Cece Hooks	G	March 11	

=== All-MAC awards ===
Postseason All-MAC teams
Team	Player	Position	Year
MAC Defensive Player of the year	Cece Hooks	G	So.
MAC Freshman of the Year	Erica Johnson	F	R-Fr.
MAC Sixth Man of the Year	Erica Johnson	F	R-Fr.
MAC 1st team	Cece Hooks	G	So.

== Rankings ==
Regular season polls
Poll	Pre- season	Week 2	Week 3	Week 4	Week 5	Week 6	Week 7	Week 8	Week 9	Week 10	Week 11	Week 12	Week 13	Week 14	Week 15	Week 16	Week 17	Week 18	Week 19	Final
AP										RV					RV					N/A
Coaches										RV										

Legend
	Increase in ranking
	Decrease in ranking
	Not ranked previous week
(RV)	Received votes
(NR)	Not ranked

== See also ==
- 2018–19 Ohio Bobcats men's basketball team
