= 2018–19 Central Michigan Chippewas women's basketball team =

Intercollegiate basketball season

2018–19 Central Michigan Chippewas women's basketball

MAC West Division Champions MAC regular season champions

NCAA tournament, first round
- Conference: Mid-American Conference
- West Division
- Record: 25–8 (15–3 MAC)
- Head coach: Sue Guevara (12th season)
- Assistant coaches: Heather Oesterle; Murriel Page; Courtney Shelton
- Home arena: McGuirk Arena

2018–19 Mid-American Conference women's basketball standings
	Conf.				Overall
Team	W		L	PCT	W		L	PCT
East
Ohio	14	–	4	.778	30	–	6	.833
Miami (OH)	13	–	5	.722	23	–	9	.719
Buffalo †	12	–	6	.667	24	–	10	.706
Kent State	11	–	7	.611	20	–	13	.606
Akron	7	–	11	.389	16	–	15	.516
Bowling Green	2	–	16	.111	9	–	21	.300
West
Central Michigan	15	–	3	.833	25	–	8	.758
Toledo	11	–	7	.611	21	–	12	.636
Northern Illinois	10	–	8	.556	19	–	13	.594
Eastern Michigan	6	–	12	.333	14	–	17	.452
Western Michigan	4	–	14	.222	10	–	20	.333
Ball State	3	–	15	.167	8	–	23	.258
† 2019 MAC tournament winner

The 2018–19 Central Michigan Chippewas women's basketball team represented Central Michigan University during the 2018–19 NCAA Division I women's basketball season. The Chippewas, led by twelfth-year head coach Sue Guevara, played their home games at McGuirk Arena as members of the West Division of the Mid-American Conference. They finished the season 25–8, 15–3 in MAC play to win the MAC West Division. The Chippewas advanced to the semifinals of the MAC women's tournament, losing there to Buffalo. They received an at-large bid to the NCAA women's tournament, losing to their in-state rival Michigan State in the first round.

This proved to be the final season for Guevara as head coach, as she retired during the 2019 offseason. At the same time that CMU announced her retirement, it announced that Guevara's top assistant Heather Oesterle would succeed her as head coach.

== Roster ==
2018–19 Central Michigan Chippewas women's basketball team
Players
Coaches

Pos.	#	Name	Height	Year	Previous school	Hometown
G	1	Micaela Kelly	5 ft 6 in (1.68 m)	RS So	Detroit Martin Luther King; DePaul	Detroit, MI
G	3	Presley Hudson	6 ft 0 in (1.83 m)	Sr	Wayland Union	Wayland, MI
G	4	Maddy Watters	5 ft 9 in (1.75 m)	So	Rockford	Rockford, MI
G	5	Anika Weekes	5 ft 10 in (1.78 m)	Fr	St. Joseph's College School	Toronto, ON
F/C	10	Emari Bell	6 ft 3 in (1.91 m)	Fr	Jones	Altamonte Springs, FL
G	11	Sophia Karasinski	5 ft 9 in (1.75 m)	So	Grand Rapids Catholic Central	Grand Rapids, MI
F	13	Reyna Frost	6 ft 0 in (1.83 m)	Sr	Reese	Reese, MI
G	21	Jeada Robinson	5 ft 8 in (1.73 m)	Sr	Bloomfield Hills Marian	Bloomfield Hills, MI
G	22	Kalle Martinez	5 ft 6 in (1.68 m)	RS Fr	John Glenn	Bay City, MI
F	24	Samantha Robinson	6 ft 1 in (1.85 m)	Fr	Bradford	Bradford, ON
C	25	Jahari Smith	6 ft 0 in (1.83 m)	Fr	Bolingbrook	Bolingbrook, IL
F	33	Gabrielle Bird	6 ft 0 in (1.83 m)	RS Jr	South Lyon East	South Lyon, MI
G/F	42	MacKenna Kelly	5 ft 10 in (1.78 m)	Jr	Frankfort	Frankfort, MI
F	50	Kyra Bussell	6 ft 1 in (1.85 m)	So	Grand Rapids Catholic Central	Grand Rapids, MI

Head coach

- Sue Guevara (Saginaw Valley State)

Assistant coach(es)

- Heather Oesterle (Michigan)
- Murriel Page (Florida)
- Courtney Shelton (Northern Illinois)

Legend

- (C) Team captain
- (S) Suspended
- (I) Ineligible
- (W) Walk-on
- Injured
- Current redshirt

Roster

== Schedule ==
Date time, TV	Rank^{#}	Opponent^{#}	Result	Record	Site (attendance) city, state
Exhibition
Nov 1, 2018*; 12:00 pm		Northwood	W 74–61		McGuirk Arena; Mount Pleasant, MI
Non-conference regular season
Nov 8, 2018*; 7:00 pm, ESPN+		Oakland	W 104–61	1–0	McGuirk Arena (1,835); Mount Pleasant, MI
Nov 12, 2018*; 7:00 pm, ESPN+		South Dakota State	L 71–80	1–1	McGuirk Arena (1,679); Mount Pleasant, MI
Nov 17, 2018*; 12:00 pm, ESPN3		Western Kentucky	W 108–90	2–1	McGuirk Arena (1,696); Mount Pleasant, MI
Nov 21, 2018*; 5:00 pm, ESPN+		UCF	W 75–68	3–1	McGuirk Arena (1,676); Mount Pleasant, MI
Nov 24, 2018*; 2:00 pm, ACCNE		at Virginia; Cavalier Classic	W 74–61	4–1	John Paul Jones Arena (2,572); Charlottesville, VA
Nov 25, 2018*; 1:00 pm		vs. Chattanooga; Cavalier Classic	W 73–50	5–1	John Paul Jones Arena (216); Charlottesville, VA
Nov 30, 2018*; 7:00 pm, ESPN+		at Iona	W 82–39	6–1	Hynes Athletic Center (608); New Rochelle, NY
Dec 2, 2018*; 2:00 pm, ESPN+		at Quinnipiac	W 67–52	7–1	People's United Center (872); Hamden, CT
Dec 15, 2018*; 6:00 pm		at Vanderbilt	W 66–57	8–1	Memorial Gymnasium (2,064); Nashville, TN
Dec 20, 2018*; 7:00 pm, ESPN+		No. 3 Louisville	L 68–72	8–2	McGuirk Arena (2,833); Mount Pleasant, MI
Dec 29, 2018*; 12:00 pm		vs. Tulane; Miami Holiday Classic	L 57–68	8–3	Watsco Center (217); Coral Gables, FL
Dec 30, 2018*; 4:00 pm, ACCNE		at No. 24 Miami (FL); Miami Holiday Classic	W 90–80	9–3	Watsco Center (727); Coral Gables, FL
MAC regular season
Jan 5, 2019; 1:00 pm, ESPN3		Akron	W 94–71	10–3 (1–0)	McGuirk Arena (2,188); Mount Pleasant, MI
Jan 9, 2019; 7:00 pm, ESPN+		at Ohio	W 88–70	11–3 (2–0)	Convocation Center (866); Athens, OH
Jan 12, 2019; 2:00 pm, ESPN3		at Northern Illinois	W 89–66	12–3 (3–0)	Convocation Center (431); DeKalb, IL
Jan 16, 2019; 7:00 pm, ESPN+		Miami (OH)	L 67–70	12–4 (3–1)	McGuirk Arena (2,054); Mount Pleasant, MI
Jan 19, 2019; 5:00 pm, ESPN3		at Kent State	W 82–75	13–4 (4–1)	MAC Center (1,552); Kent, OH
Jan 23, 2019; 7:00 pm, ESPN+		at Toledo	L 59–62	13–5 (4–2)	Savage Arena (3,603); Toledo, OH
Jan 26, 2019; 1:00 pm, ESPN+		Eastern Michigan; Michigan MAC Trophy	W 71–61	14–5 (5–2)	McGuirk Arena (2,573); Mount Pleasant, MI
Feb 2, 2019; 1:00 pm, ESPN3		Buffalo	W 76–65	15–5 (6–2)	McGuirk Arena (2,228); Mount Pleasant, MI
Feb 6, 2019; 7:00 pm, ESPN3		Ball State	W 81–63	16–5 (7–2)	McGuirk Arena (1,879); Mount Pleasant, MI
Feb 9, 2019; 1:00 pm, ESPN3		Ohio	L 75–78	16–6 (7–3)	McGuirk Arena (2,152); Mount Pleasant, MI
Feb 13, 2019; 7:00 pm, ESPN+		at Western Michigan; Michigan MAC Trophy	W 87–53	17–6 (8–3)	University Arena (721); Kalamazoo, MI
Feb 16, 2019; 2:00 pm, ESPN3		at Buffalo	W 100–95	18–6 (9–3)	Alumni Arena (3,369); Amherst, NY
Feb 20, 2019; 7:00 pm, ESPN+		at Bowling Green; Rescheduled from January 30	W 92–54	19–6 (10–3)	Stroh Center (1,163); Bowling Green, OH
Feb 23, 2019; 1:00 pm, ESPN3		Northern Illinois	W 76–52	20–6 (11–3)	McGuirk Arena (2,157); Mount Pleasant, MI
Feb 27, 2019; 7:00 pm, ESPN+		at Ball State	W 81–64	21–6 (12–3)	Worthen Arena (1,100); Muncie, IN
Mar 2, 2019; 2:00 pm, ESPN3		at Eastern Michigan; Michigan MAC Trophy	W 87–60	22–6 (13–3)	Convocation Center (1,457); Ypsilanti, MI
Mar 6, 2019; 7:00 pm, ESPN3		Western Michigan; Michigan MAC Trophy	W 80–57	23–6 (14–3)	McGuirk Arena (1,942); Mount Pleasant, MI
Mar 9, 2019; 1:00 pm, ESPN+		Toledo	W 78–45	24–6 (15–3)	McGuirk Arena (2,619); Mount Pleasant, MI
MAC Women's Tournament
Mar 13, 2019; 12:00 pm, ESPN+	(1)	vs. (9) Eastern Michigan; Quarterfinals	W 88–80	25–6	Quicken Loans Arena; Cleveland, OH
Mar 15, 2019; 11:00 am, ESPN+	(1)	vs. (4) Buffalo; Semifinals	L 77–82	25–7	Quicken Loans Arena; Cleveland, OH
NCAA Women's Tournament
03/23/2019*; 1:30 pm, ESPN2	(7 C)	vs. (10 C) Michigan State; First Round	L 87–88	25–8	Edmund P. Joyce Center (7,885); South Bend, IN
*Non-conference game. ^{#}Rankings from AP Poll. (#) Tournament seedings in parentheses. C=Chicago Region. All times are in Eastern Time.

== Rankings ==
2018–19 NCAA Division I women's basketball rankings

Regular season polls
Poll	Pre- Season	Week 2	Week 3	Week 4	Week 5	Week 6	Week 7	Week 8	Week 9	Week 10	Week 11	Week 12	Week 13	Week 14	Week 15	Week 16	Week 17	Week 18	Week 19	Final
AP	RV	RV			RV	RV			RV	RV	RV			RV		RV	RV			N/A
Coaches	RV	RV^						RV	RV	RV	RV	RV								

Legend
	Increase in ranking
	Decrease in ranking
	Not ranked previous week
(RV)	Received Votes

^Coaches did not release a Week 2 poll.

== See also ==
- 2018–19 Central Michigan Chippewas men's basketball team
