= 2019 MAC women's basketball tournament =

- Classification: Division I
- Season: 2018–19
- Teams: 12
- First round site: Campus sites
- Quarterfinals site: Quicken Loans Arena; Cleveland, Ohio
- Semifinals site: Quicken Loans Arena; Cleveland, Ohio
- Finals site: Quicken Loans Arena; Cleveland, Ohio
- Champions: Buffalo (2nd title)
- Winning coach: Felisha Legette-Jack (2nd title)
- MVP: Cierra Dillard (Buffalo)
- Television: CBSSN, ESPN+
- MAC women's basketball tournaments

2018–19 Mid-American Conference women's basketball standings
	Conf.				Overall
Team	W		L	PCT	W		L	PCT
East
Ohio	14	–	4	.778	30	–	6	.833
Miami (OH)	13	–	5	.722	23	–	9	.719
Buffalo †	12	–	6	.667	24	–	10	.706
Kent State	11	–	7	.611	20	–	13	.606
Akron	7	–	11	.389	16	–	15	.516
Bowling Green	2	–	16	.111	9	–	21	.300
West
Central Michigan	15	–	3	.833	25	–	8	.758
Toledo	11	–	7	.611	21	–	12	.636
Northern Illinois	10	–	8	.556	19	–	13	.594
Eastern Michigan	6	–	12	.333	14	–	17	.452
Western Michigan	4	–	14	.222	10	–	20	.333
Ball State	3	–	15	.167	8	–	23	.258
† 2019 MAC tournament winner

The 2019 MAC women's basketball tournament was the postseason basketball tournament that ended the 2018–19 college basketball season in the Mid-American Conference. Tournament first-round games were held on campus sites at the higher seed on March 11. The remaining rounds were held at Quicken Loans Arena, now known as Rocket Mortgage FieldHouse, in Cleveland, Ohio between March 13 and 16. The MAC Women's Tournament champion received the conference's automatic bid into the 2019 NCAA tournament. Buffalo won the conference tournament championship game 77–61 over Ohio. Cierra Dillard was named the tournament's Most Valuable Player.

== Format ==
Unlike recent MAC women's tournaments, in which the top two seeds received byes into the semifinals, with the 3 and 4 seeds receiving a bye to the quarterfinals, the tournament reverted to its original structure in which the top four seeds receive just one bye into the quarterfinals.

== Seeds ==
Seed	School	Conference record	Division	Tiebreaker
1	Central Michigan	15–3	24–6	
2	Ohio	14–4	25–4	
3	Miami (OH)	13–5	22–7	
4	Buffalo	12–6	20–9	
5	Kent State	11–7	18–11	1–0 vs. TOL
6	Toledo	11–7	19–10	0–1 vs. KSU
7	Northern Illinois	10–8	18–12	
8	Akron	7–11	16–13	
9	Eastern Michigan	6–12	13–16	
10	Western Michigan	4–14	10–19	
11	Ball State	3–15	10–19	
12	Bowling Green	2–16	9–20	

== Schedule ==
Game	Time	Matchup	Score	Television
First round – Monday March 11 – Campus sites
1	5:00 pm	No. 9 Eastern Michigan at No. 8 Akron	61–59	ESPN+
2	7:00 pm	No. 12 Bowling Green at No. 5 Kent State	62–86	ESPN+
3	6:30 pm	No. 10 Western Michigan at No. 7 Northern Illinois	69–70	ESPN+
4	7:00 pm	No. 11 Ball State at No. 6 Toledo	63–67	ESPN+
Quarterfinals – Wednesday March 13 – Quicken Loans Arena, Cleveland, OH
5	12:00 pm	No. 9 Eastern Michigan vs. No. 1 Central Michigan	80–88, OT	ESPN+
6	2:30 pm	No. 5 Kent State vs. No. 4 Buffalo	52–85	ESPN+
7	5:00 pm	No. 7 Northern Illinois vs. No. 2 Ohio	56–72	ESPN+
8	7:30 pm	No. 6 Toledo vs. No. 3 Miami (OH)	54–72	ESPN+
Semifinals – Friday March 15 – Quicken Loans Arena, Cleveland, OH
9	11:00 am	No. 1 Central Michigan vs. No. 4 Buffalo	77-82	ESPN+
10	1:30 pm	No. 2 Ohio vs. No. 3 Miami (OH)	74-48	ESPN+
Championship – Saturday March 16 – Quicken Loans Arena, Cleveland, OH
11	11:00 am	No. 2 Ohio vs. No. 4 Buffalo	77-61	CBSSN
Game times in ET. Rankings denote tournament seed

== Bracket ==
Miami (OH), Ohio, Buffalo and Central Michigan have clinched first round byes
Miami (OH), Ohio, Buffalo and Central Michigan have clinched home games in the second round
Akron, Bowling Green, Eastern Michigan, Western Michigan and Ball State will play in the first round

First round
8	Akron	59
9	Eastern Michigan	61
5	Kent State	86
12	Bowling Green	62
7	Northern Illinois	70
10	Western Michigan	69
6	Toledo	67
11	Ball State	63

Quarterfinals
1	Central Michigan	88*
9	Eastern Michigan	80
4	Buffalo	85
5	Kent State	52
2	Ohio	72
7	Northern Illinois	56
3	Miami (OH)	72
6	Toledo	54

Semifinals
1	Central Michigan	77
4	Buffalo	82
2	Ohio	74
3	Miami (OH)	48

Championship
4	Buffalo	77
2	Ohio	61

First round games at campus sites of lower-numbered seeds

== All-Tournament team ==
Tournament MVP – Cierra Dillard, Buffalo

Player	Team
Cierra Dillard	Buffalo
Hanna Hall	Buffalo
Summer Hemphill	Buffalo
Reyna Frost	Central Michigan
Cece Hooks	Ohio

== See also ==
2019 MAC men's basketball tournament
