= 2018–19 Western Michigan Broncos women's basketball team =

Intercollegiate basketball season

2018–19 Western Michigan Broncos women's basketball
- Conference: Mid-American Conference
- West Division
- Record: 10–20 (4–14 MAC)
- Head coach: Shane Clipfell (7th season)
- Assistant coaches: Russ Rose; Cetera Washington; Vanessa Abel
- Home arena: University Arena

2018–19 Mid-American Conference women's basketball standings
	Conf.				Overall
Team	W		L	PCT	W		L	PCT
East
Ohio	14	–	4	.778	30	–	6	.833
Miami (OH)	13	–	5	.722	23	–	9	.719
Buffalo †	12	–	6	.667	24	–	10	.706
Kent State	11	–	7	.611	20	–	13	.606
Akron	7	–	11	.389	16	–	15	.516
Bowling Green	2	–	16	.111	9	–	21	.300
West
Central Michigan	15	–	3	.833	25	–	8	.758
Toledo	11	–	7	.611	21	–	12	.636
Northern Illinois	10	–	8	.556	19	–	13	.594
Eastern Michigan	6	–	12	.333	14	–	17	.452
Western Michigan	4	–	14	.222	10	–	20	.333
Ball State	3	–	15	.167	8	–	23	.258
† 2019 MAC tournament winner

The 2018–19 Western Michigan Broncos women's basketball team represented Western Michigan University during the 2018–19 NCAA Division I women's basketball season. The Broncos, led by seventh year head coach Shane Clipfell, played their home games at University Arena as members of the West Division of the Mid-American Conference. They finished the season 10–20, 4–14 in MAC play to finish in fifth place of the West division. They lost in the first round of the MAC women's tournament to Northern Illinois.

== Roster ==
2018–19 Western Michigan Broncos women's basketball team
Players
Coaches

Pos.	#	Name	Height	Year	Previous school	Hometown
G	0	Jacinta Gibson	5 ft 10 in (1.78 m)	Fr	Jeffersonville	Jeffersonville, IN
G	1	Kia Brooks	5 ft 9 in (1.75 m)	So	North Lawndale	Chicago, IL
G	2	Maddie Watters	5 ft 8 in (1.73 m)	Fr	Williamston	Williamston, MI
G	3	Jillian Fletcher	5 ft 9 in (1.75 m)	RS Jr	Ursuline Academy; West Virginia State	Cincinnati, OH
G	4	Deja Wimby	5 ft 7 in (1.7 m)	Sr	Snider	Fort Wayne, IN
G	5	Nina Farkic	5 ft 9 in (1.75 m)	So	Cameron Heights	Kitchener, ON
F	10	Breanna Mobley	6 ft 1 in (1.85 m)	Sr	Lansing Waverly	Lansing, MI
G	11	Kamrin Reed	5 ft 7 in (1.7 m)	Jr	Holt	Holt, MI
G	20	Logan McCane	5 ft 9 in (1.75 m)	Sr	Rockford	Rockford, MI
F	21	Hannah Douglas	5 ft 11 in (1.8 m)	Fr	Walled Lake Central	Walled Lake, MI
G/F	22	Meredith Miller	5 ft 10 in (1.78 m)	Sr	Hilliard Bradley	Hilliard, OH
G	23	Jordan Walker	5 ft 8 in (1.73 m)	So	Mona Shores	Muskegon, MI
F	24	Leighah-Amori Wool	6 ft 0 in (1.83 m)	So	Evanston	Evanston, IL
G	32	Kiana Cencula	5 ft 9 in (1.75 m)	Fr	Adlai E. Stevenson	Lincolnshire, IL
G	34	Jasmyn Walker	5 ft 10 in (1.78 m)	RS Sr	Mona Shores; Valparaiso	Muskegon, MI
F	44	Maxine Moore	6 ft 0 in (1.83 m)	Fr	Detroit Country Day	Southfield, MI

Head coach

- Shane Clipfell (Eastern Michigan)

Assistant coach(es)

- Russ Rose (Davenport)
- Cetera Washington (Michigan State)
- Vanessa Abel (Duquesne)

Legend

- (C) Team captain
- (S) Suspended
- (I) Ineligible
- (W) Walk-on
- Injured
- Current redshirt

Roster

== Schedule ==
Date time, TV	Rank^{#}	Opponent^{#}	Result	Record	Site (attendance) city, state
Exhibition
Nov 2, 2018*; 6:00 pm		Grace Christian	W 91–46		University Arena; Kalamazoo, MI
Non-conference regular season
Nov 8, 2018*; 7:00 pm, ESPN+		Purdue Fort Wayne	W 69–61	1–0	University Arena (560); Kalamazoo, MI
Nov 11, 2018*; 1:00 pm, ESPN+		New Mexico State	L 54–66	1–1	University Arena (591); Kalamazoo, MI
Nov 15, 2018*; 7:00 pm, ESPN+		Michigan	L 42–79	1–2	University Arena (1,250); Kalamazoo, MI
Nov 18, 2018*; 3:00 pm		at Ole Miss	L 66–69	1–3	The Pavilion at Ole Miss (1,311); Oxford, MS
Nov 28, 2018*; 7:00 pm, ESPN+		Eastern Kentucky	W 64–53	2–3	University Arena (380); Kalamazoo, MI
Dec 3, 2018*; 7:00 pm, ESPN+		Loyola–Chicago	L 53–64	2–4	University Arena (462); Kalamazoo, MI
Dec 9, 2018*; 1:00 pm, ESPN+		at Detroit Mercy	W 54–44	3–4	Calihan Hall (407); Detroit, MI
Dec 16, 2018*; 2:00 pm		at Florida Atlantic	W 69–59	4–4	FAU Arena (340); Boca Raton, FL
Dec 20, 2018*; 3:00 pm		vs. North Dakota; Hatter Classic	L 50–62	4–5	Edmunds Center (105); DeLand, FL
Dec 21, 2018*; 3:00 pm		vs. Florida A&M; Hatter Classic	W 69–50	5–5	Edmunds Center (75); DeLand, FL
Dec 31, 2018*; 2:00 pm, ESPN+		Saginaw Valley State	W 75–51	6–5	University Arena (590); Kalamazoo, MI
MAC regular season
Jan 5, 2019; 2:00 pm, ESPN3		at Bowling Green	W 84–82	7–5 (1–0)	Stroh Center (1,465); Bowling Green, OH
Jan 9, 2019; 7:00 pm, ESPN+		Akron	L 59–72	7–6 (1–1)	University Arena (578); Kalamazoo, MI
Jan 12, 2019; 2:30 pm, ESPN3		at Eastern Michigan; Michigan MAC Trophy	L 61–64	7–7 (1–2)	Convocation Center (2,865); Ypsilanti, MI
Jan 16, 2019; 7:00 pm, ESPN+		Toledo	L 57–80	7–8 (1–3)	University Arena (513); Kalamazoo, MI
Jan 19, 2019; 2:00 pm, ESPN3		Buffalo	L 59–61	7–9 (1–4)	University Arena (730); Kalamazoo, MI
Jan 26, 2019; 1:00 pm, ESPN3		at Ball State	W 65–62	8–9 (2–4)	Worthen Arena (1,066); Muncie, IN
Feb 2, 2019; 2:00 pm, ESPN3		Miami (OH)	L 62–81	8–10 (2–5)	University Arena (1,012); Kalamazoo, MI
Feb 6, 2019; 2:00 pm, ESPN+		at Kent State	L 51–55	8–11 (2–6)	MAC Center (931); Kent, OH
Feb 9, 2019; 5:00 pm, ESPN3		at Akron	L 62–69	8–12 (2–7)	James A. Rhodes Arena (455); Akron, OH
Feb 13, 2019; 7:00 pm, ESPN+		Central Michigan; Michigan MAC Trophy	L 53–87	8–13 (2–8)	University Arena (721); Kalamazoo, MI
Feb 16, 2019; 1:00 pm, ESPN3		at Ohio	L 56–70	8–14 (2–9)	Convocation Center (729); Athens, OH
Feb 18, 2019; 4:00 pm, ESPN3		at Northern Illinois; Rescheduled from January 30	L 64–77	8–15 (2–10)	Convocation Center (296); DeKalb, IL
Feb 20, 2019; 7:00 pm, ESPN+		Kent State	L 52–56	8–16 (2–11)	University Arena (517); Kalamazoo, MI
Feb 23, 2019; 2:00 pm, ESPN+		Eastern Michigan; Michigan MAC Trophy	W 71–68	9–16 (3–11)	University Arena (660); Kalamazoo, MI
Feb 27, 2019; 7:00 pm, ESPN+		at Toledo	L 63–73	9–17 (3–12)	Savage Arena (3,377); Toledo, OH
Mar 2, 2019; 2:00 pm, ESPN3		Ball State	W 72–54	10–17 (3–13)	University Arena (915); Kalamazoo, MI
Mar 6, 2019; 7:00 pm, ESPN3		at Central Michigan; Michigan MAC Trophy	L 57–80	10–18 (3–14)	McGuirk Arena (1,942); Mount Pleasant, MI
Mar 9, 2019; 2:00 pm, ESPN+		Northern Illinois	L 71–74	10–19 (3–15)	University Arena (594); Kalamazoo, MI
MAC Women's Tournament
Mar 11, 2019; 6:30 pm, ESPN+	(10)	at (7) Northern Illinois; First Round	L 69–70	10–20	Convocation Center (496); DeKalb, IL
*Non-conference game. ^{#}Rankings from AP Poll. (#) Tournament seedings in parentheses. All times are in Eastern Time.

== See also ==
- 2018–19 Western Michigan Broncos men's basketball team
