= 2018–19 Kent State Golden Flashes women's basketball team =

American college basketball season

2018–19 Kent State Golden Flashes women's basketball

WNIT, second round
- Conference: Mid-American Conference
- East Division
- Record: 20–13 (11–7 MAC)
- Head coach: Todd Starkey (3rd season)
- Assistant coaches: Fran Recchia; Morgan Toles; Mike McKee
- Home arena: MAC Center

2018–19 Mid-American Conference women's basketball standings
	Conf.				Overall
Team	W		L	PCT	W		L	PCT
East
Ohio	14	–	4	.778	30	–	6	.833
Miami (OH)	13	–	5	.722	23	–	9	.719
Buffalo †	12	–	6	.667	24	–	10	.706
Kent State	11	–	7	.611	20	–	13	.606
Akron	7	–	11	.389	16	–	15	.516
Bowling Green	2	–	16	.111	9	–	21	.300
West
Central Michigan	15	–	3	.833	25	–	8	.758
Toledo	11	–	7	.611	21	–	12	.636
Northern Illinois	10	–	8	.556	19	–	13	.594
Eastern Michigan	6	–	12	.333	14	–	17	.452
Western Michigan	4	–	14	.222	10	–	20	.333
Ball State	3	–	15	.167	8	–	23	.258
† 2019 MAC tournament winner

The 2018–19 Kent State Golden Flashes women's basketball team represented Kent State University during the 2018–19 NCAA Division I women's basketball season. The Golden Flashes, led by third-year head coach Todd Starkey, played their home games at the Memorial Athletic and Convocation Center, also known as the MAC Center, in Kent, Ohio as members of the East Division of the Mid-American Conference (MAC). They finished the season 20–13, 11–7 in MAC play, to finish in fourth place in the West Division. They advanced to the quarterfinals of the MAC women's tournament, where they lost to Buffalo. They received an at-large bid to the WNIT, where they defeated Green Bay in the first round before losing to Butler in the second round.

== Roster ==
2018–19 Kent State Golden Flashes women's basketball team
Players
Coaches

Pos.	#	Name	Height	Year	Previous school	Hometown
G/F	2	Annie Pavlansky	6 ft 1 in (1.85 m)	Fr	Lakeview	Cortland, OH
G	3	Asiah Dingle	5 ft 4 in (1.63 m)	Fr	Archbishop Williams	Stoughton, MA
G	5	Mariah Modkins	5 ft 1 in (1.55 m)	Fr	Solon	Solon, OH
G	10	Jess Wallis	5 ft 10 in (1.78 m)	Jr	Rhea County; Walters State CC	Dayton, TN
F	15	Sydney Brinlee	6 ft 0 in (1.83 m)	Jr	Latta; Highland CC	Allen, OK
F	22	Merissa Barber-Smith	6 ft 4 in (1.93 m)	Sr	La Follette	Madison, WI
G	23	Ali Poole	6 ft 0 in (1.83 m)	Jr	Carrollton	Carrollton, OH
G	24	Alexa Golden	5 ft 9 in (1.75 m)	Sr	Chartiers Valley	Pittsburgh, PA
G	25	Monique Smith	5 ft 11 in (1.8 m)	So	Serra	San Diego, CA
G	31	Megan Carter	5 ft 7 in (1.7 m)	RS Jr	North Farmington	Farmington Hills, MI
G	32	Hannah Young	5 ft 10 in (1.78 m)	Fr	Brookville	Forest, VA
G	40	Margaux Eibel	5 ft 11 in (1.8 m)	So	La Costa Canyon	Carlsbad, CA
F	44	Lindsey Thall	6 ft 2 in (1.88 m)	Fr	Strongville	Strongsville, OH
C	50	Amanda Sape	6 ft 3 in (1.91 m)	So	Bloomfield Hills	Bloomfield Hills, MI

Head coach

- Todd Starkey (Montreat)

Assistant coach(es)

- Fran Recchia (Virginia Tech)
- Morgan Toles (Florida State)
- Mike McKee (Kent State)

Legend

- (C) Team captain
- (S) Suspended
- (I) Ineligible
- (W) Walk-on
- Injured
- Current redshirt

Roster
Last update: April 30, 2025

== Schedule ==
Date time, TV	Rank^{#}	Opponent^{#}	Result	Record	Site (attendance) city, state
Exhibition
November 4, 2018*; 2:00 p.m.		Slippery Rock	W 77–48		MAC Center; Kent, OH
Non-conference regular season
November 9, 2018*; 6:00 p.m., ACCNE		at North Carolina	L 60–73	0–1	Carmichael Arena (2,005); Chapel Hill, NC
November 11, 2018*; 2:00 p.m., ACCNE		at NC State	L 61–78	0–2	Reynolds Coliseum (2,126); Raleigh, NC
November 17, 2018*; 5:00 p.m., ESPN3		Northern Kentucky; Kent State Classic	W 62–61	1–2	MAC Center (1,273); Kent, OH
November 18, 2018*; 1:30 p.m., ESPN3		Oakland; Kent State Classic	W 75–65	2–2	MAC Center (821); Kent, OH
November 20, 2018*; 5:00 p.m., ESPN3		Youngstown State	W 62–34	3–2	MAC Center (1,925); Kent, OH
November 28, 2018*; 7:00 p.m., ESPN+		Duquesne	L 72–77	3–3	MAC Center (413); Kent, OH
December 2, 2018*; 2:00 p.m., ESPN+		at Wright State	L 55–61	3–4	Nutter Center (343); Dayton, OH
December 7, 2018*; 7:00 p.m.		at Robert Morris	W 54–46	4–4	North Athletic Complex (466); Moon Township, PA
December 17, 2018*; 7:00 p.m., ESPN+		at St. Bonaventure	W 76–64	5–4	Reilly Center (457); Olean, NY
December 21, 2018*; 2:00 p.m., ESPN+		at NJIT	W 57–40	6–4	Wellness and Events Center (322); Newark, NJ
December 31, 2018*; 12:00 p.m., ESPN+		Clarion	W 92–38	7–4	MAC Center (359); Kent, OH
MAC regular season
January 5, 2019; 5:00 p.m., ESPN3		Eastern Michigan	W 71–64	8–4 (1–0)	MAC Center (1,724); Kent, OH
January 9, 2019; 7:00 p.m., ESPN3		Northern Illinois	W 87–78	9–4 (2–0)	MAC Center (215); Kent, OH
January 12, 2019; 2:00 p.m., ESPN3		at Toledo	W 58–47	10–4 (3–0)	Savage Arena (4,071); Toledo, OH
January 16, 2019; 7:00 p.m., ESPN3		at Ohio	L 81–83	10–5 (3–1)	Convocation Center (450); Athens, OH
January 19, 2019; 5:00 p.m., ESPN3		Central Michigan	L 75–82	10–6 (3–2)	MAC Center (1,552); Kent, OH
January 23, 2019; 7:00 p.m., ESPN+		at Ball State	L 44–48	10–7 (3–3)	Worthen Arena (1,055); Muncie, IN
January 26, 2019; 1:00 p.m., ESPN3		at Miami (OH)	L 63–79	10–8 (3–4)	Millett Hall (770); Oxford, OH
February 2, 2019; 2:00 p.m., ESPN3		Akron	W 73–58	11–8 (4–4)	MAC Center (2,224); Akron, OH
February 6, 2019; 7:00 p.m., ESPN+		Western Michigan	W 55–51	12–8 (5–4)	MAC Center (931); Akron, OH
February 9, 2019; 1:00 p.m., ESPN3		at Buffalo	L 66–75	12–9 (5–5)	Alumni Arena (2,385); Amherst, MA
February 13, 2019; 7:00 p.m., ESPN+		at Eastern Michigan	W 67–54	13–9 (6–5)	Convocation Center (1,086); Ypsilanti, MI
February 16, 2019; 5:00 p.m., ESPN+		Bowling Green	W 77–73	14–9 (7–5)	MAC Center (1,660); Kent, OH
February 20, 2019; 7:00 p.m., ESPN+		at Western Michigan	W 56–52	15–9 (8–5)	University Arena (517); Kalamazoo, MI
February 23, 2019; 2:00 p.m., ESPN3		Ohio	L 67–69	15–10 (8–6)	MAC Center (1,208); Kent, OH
February 27, 2019; 1:00 p.m., ESPN+		Miami (OH)	W 67–58	16–10 (9–6)	MAC Center (1,342); Kent, OH
March 2, 2019; 1:00 p.m., ESPN3		at Bowling Green	L 49–62	16–11 (9–7)	Stroh Center (1,928); Bowling Green, OH
March 6, 2019; 7:00 p.m., ESPN+		at Akron	W 65–55 ^{OT}	17–11 (10–7)	James A. Rhodes Arena (671); Akron, OH
March 9, 2019; 2:00 p.m., ESPN+		Buffalo	W 62–53	18–11 (11–7)	MAC Center (1,731); Akron, OH
MAC tournament
March 11, 2019; 7:00 p.m., ESPN+	(5)	(12) Bowling Green; First round	W 86–62	19–11	MAC Center; Kent, OH
March 13, 2019; 2:30 p.m., ESPN+	(5)	vs. (4) Buffalo; Quarterfinals	L 52–85	19–12	Quicken Loans Arena; Cleveland, OH
WNIT
March 21, 2019*; 7:00 p.m.		at Green Bay; First round	W 64–59	20–12	Kress Events Center (1,269); Green Bay, WI
March 23, 2019*; 3:00 p.m.		at Butler; Second round	L 52–70	20–13	Hinkle Fieldhouse (747); Indianapolis, IN
*Non-conference game. ^{#}Rankings from AP poll. (#) Tournament seedings in parentheses. All times are in Eastern.

== See also ==
- 2018–19 Kent State Golden Flashes men's basketball team
