= 2018–19 Ball State Cardinals women's basketball team =

Intercollegiate basketball season

2018–19 Ball State Cardinals women's basketball
- Conference: Mid-American Conference
- West Division
- Record: 8–23 (3–15 MAC)
- Head coach: Brady Sallee (7th season)
- Assistant coaches: Audrey McDonald-Spencer; Ryan Patterson; Bri Kulas
- Home arena: Worthen Arena

2018–19 Mid-American Conference women's basketball standings
	Conf.				Overall
Team	W		L	PCT	W		L	PCT
East
Ohio	14	–	4	.778	30	–	6	.833
Miami (OH)	13	–	5	.722	23	–	9	.719
Buffalo †	12	–	6	.667	24	–	10	.706
Kent State	11	–	7	.611	20	–	13	.606
Akron	7	–	11	.389	16	–	15	.516
Bowling Green	2	–	16	.111	9	–	21	.300
West
Central Michigan	15	–	3	.833	25	–	8	.758
Toledo	11	–	7	.611	21	–	12	.636
Northern Illinois	10	–	8	.556	19	–	13	.594
Eastern Michigan	6	–	12	.333	14	–	17	.452
Western Michigan	4	–	14	.222	10	–	20	.333
Ball State	3	–	15	.167	8	–	23	.258
† 2019 MAC tournament winner

The 2018–19 Ball State Cardinals women's basketball team represented Ball State University during the 2018–19 NCAA Division I women's basketball season. The Cardinals, led by seventh-year head coach Brady Sallee, played their home games at Worthen Arena as members of the West Division of the Mid-American Conference. They sought to qualify for the NCAA Division I women's basketball tournament for the second time and the first time since 2009, but they finished the season 8–23, 3–15 in MAC play to finish in last place in the West Division. They lost in the first of the MAC women's tournament to Toledo.

== Roster ==
2018–19 Ball State Cardinals women's basketball team
Players
Coaches

Pos.	#	Name	Height	Year	Previous school	Hometown
G	1	Abi Haynes	5 ft 6 in (1.68 m)	Fr	Lincoln	Vincennes, IN
G	2	Katie Helgason	5 ft 7 in (1.7 m)	So	Greenfield Central	Greenfield, IN
G	3	Hadassah Harris	5 ft 5 in (1.65 m)	So	Heritage Christian	Indianapolis, IN
G	5	Maliah Howard-Bass	5 ft 9 in (1.75 m)	So	Columbus North	Columbus, IN
F	10	Thelma Dís Ágústsdóttir	6 ft 0 in (1.83 m)	Fr	Keflavík	Reykjanesbær, Iceland
F	21	Blake Smith	6 ft 3 in (1.91 m)	Fr	Carmel	Carmel, IN
G	23	Gabby Smith	5 ft 9 in (1.75 m)	Fr	Bolingbrook	Bolingbrook, IL
G	24	Jasmin Samz	5 ft 9 in (1.75 m)	Sr	Wausaw	Wausau, WI
G	30	Anna Clephane	5 ft 10 in (1.78 m)	Fr	Scott	Taylor Mill, KY
G	31	Nakeya Penny	5 ft 11 in (1.8 m)	Sr	Logansport	Logansport, IN
F	32	Oshlyn Brown	6 ft 1 in (1.85 m)	So	Chillicothe	Chillicothe, OH
F	34	Aliyah Walker	5 ft 11 in (1.8 m)	Jr	Brownsburg	Indianapolis, IN

Head coach

- Brady Sallee (Thomas More)

Assistant coach(es)

- Audrey McDonald-Spencer (Ball State)
- Ryan Patterson (Malone)
- Bri Kulas (Missouri)

Legend

- (C) Team captain
- (S) Suspended
- (I) Ineligible
- (W) Walk-on
- Injured
- Current redshirt

Roster

== Schedule ==
Date time, TV	Rank^{#}	Opponent^{#}	Result	Record	Site (attendance) city, state
Non-conference regular season
November 7, 2018*; 7:00 pm, ESPN+		Purdue	L 38–80	0–1	Worthen Arena (3,104); Muncie, IN
November 11, 2018*; 2:00 pm, ESPN+		Cleveland State	W 67–62	1–1	Worthen Arena (1,309); Muncie, IN
November 17, 2018*; 3:00 pm, ESPN3		at Missouri State	L 54–74	1–2	JQH Arena (2,018); Springfield, MO
November 23, 2018*; 11:00 am		vs. Fordham; Gulf Coast Showcase Quarterfinals	L 70–78	1–3	Hertz Arena (429); Estero, FL
November 24, 2018*; 11:00 am		vs. Duke; Gulf Coast Showcase consolation 2nd round	L 62–79	1–4	Hertz Arena (516); Estero, FL
November 25, 2018*; 11:00 am		vs. Quinnipiac; Gulf Coast Showcase 7th place game	L 66–69	1–5	Hertz Arena (516); Estero, FL
November 28, 2018*; 7:00 pm, ESPN+		Cincinnati	W 75–63	2–5	Worthen Arena (1,110); Muncie, IN
December 2, 2018*; 2:00 pm, Facebook		at Butler	L 47–67	2–6	Hinkle Fieldhouse (1,524); Indianapolis, IN
December 6, 2018*; 7:00 pm, ESPN3		Vanderbilt	L 43–60	2–7	Worthen Arena (923); Muncie, IN
December 16, 2018*; 2:00 pm, ESPN3		at Western Kentucky	W 86–83	3–7	E. A. Diddle Arena (715); Bowling Green, KY
December 21, 2018*; 7:00 pm, ESPN3		Tennessee State	W 90–51	4–7	Worthen Arena (1,223); Muncie, IN
December 30, 2018*; 7:00 pm, ESPN3		Urbana	W 99–62	5–7	Worthen Arena (1,082); Muncie, IN
MAC regular season
January 5, 2019; 2:00 pm, ESPN3		at Toledo	W 65–58	5–8 (0–1)	Savage Arena (3,473); Toledo, OH
January 9, 2019; 11:00 am, ESPN+		Bowling Green	W 77–70	6–8 (1–1)	Worthen Arena (2,112); Muncie, IN
January 12, 2019; 2:00 pm, ESPN3		Ohio	L 75–90	6–9 (1–2)	Worthen Arena (4,076); Muncie, IN
January 16, 2019; 7:00 pm, ESPN3		at Buffalo	L 65–77	6–10 (1–3)	Alumni Arena (1,615); Buffalo, NY
January 19, 2019; 1:00 pm, ESPN3		at Miami (OH)	L 57–60	6–11 (1–4)	Millett Hall (317); Oxford, OH
January 23, 2019; 7:00 pm, ESPN+		Kent State	W 48–44	7–11 (2–4)	Worthen Arena (1,055); Muncie, IN
January 26, 2019; 1:00 pm, ESPN3		Western Michigan	L 62–65	7–12 (2–5)	Worthen Arena (1,066); Muncie, IN
February 2, 2019; 1:00 pm, ESPN3		at Ohio	L 62–94	7–13 (2–6)	Convocation Center; Athens, OH
February 6, 2019; 7:00 pm, ESPN3		at Central Michigan	L 63–81	7–14 (2–7)	McGuirk Arena (1,879); Mount Pleasant, MI
February 9, 2019; 4:30 pm, ESPN3		Northern Illinois	L 83–93	7–15 (2–8)	Worthen Arena (1,333); Muncie, IN
February 13, 2019; 7:00 pm, ESPN+		at Akron	L 61–91	7–16 (2–9)	James A. Rhodes Arena (392); Akron, OH
February 16, 2019; 2:00 pm, ESPN+		at Eastern Michigan	L 53–56	7–17 (2–10)	Convocation Center (1,228); Ypsilanti, MI
February 20, 2019; 7:00 pm, ESPN3		Buffalo; Rescheduled from January 30	L 58–97	7–18 (2–11)	Worthen Arena (1,036); Muncie, IN
February 23, 2019; 4:30 pm, ESPN3		Toledo	L 62–63	7–19 (2–12)	Worthen Arena (4,389); Muncie, IN
February 27, 2019; 7:00 pm, ESPN+		Central Michigan	L 64–81	7–20 (2–13)	Worthen Arena (1,100); Muncie, IN
March 2, 2019; 2:00 pm, ESPN3		at Western Michigan	L 54–72	7–21 (2–14)	University Arena (915); Kalamazoo, MI
March 6, 2019; 7:00 pm, ESPN+		at Northern Illinois	W 67–64	8–21 (3–14)	Convocation Center (501); DeKalb, IL
March 9, 2019; 2:00 pm, ESPN+		Eastern Michigan	L 57–67	8–22 (3–15)	Worthen Arena (2,070); Muncie, IN
MAC Women's Tournament
Mar 11, 2019; 7:00 pm, ESPN+	(11)	at (6) Toledo; First Round	L 63–67	8–23	Savage Arena (4,059); Toledo, OH
*Non-conference game. ^{#}Rankings from AP Poll. (#) Tournament seedings in parentheses. All times are in Eastern Time.

== See also ==
- 2018–19 Ball State Cardinals men's basketball team
