= 2018–19 Eastern Michigan Eagles women's basketball team =

Intercollegiate basketball season

2018–19 Eastern Michigan Eagles women's basketball
- Conference: Mid-American Conference
- West Division
- Record: 14–17 (6–12 MAC)
- Head coach: Fred Castro (3rd season)
- Assistant coaches: Adam Call; Cassandra Callaway; Carlos Adamson
- Home arena: Convocation Center

2018–19 Mid-American Conference women's basketball standings
| | Conf. | | | | Overall |
| Team | W | | L | PCT | W | | L | PCT |
|---|---|---|---|---|---|---|---|---|
East
| Ohio | 14 | – | 4 | .778 | 30 | – | 6 | .833 |
| Miami (OH) | 13 | – | 5 | .722 | 23 | – | 9 | .719 |
| Buffalo † | 12 | – | 6 | .667 | 24 | – | 10 | .706 |
| Kent State | 11 | – | 7 | .611 | 20 | – | 13 | .606 |
| Akron | 7 | – | 11 | .389 | 16 | – | 15 | .516 |
| Bowling Green | 2 | – | 16 | .111 | 9 | – | 21 | .300 |
West
| Central Michigan | 15 | – | 3 | .833 | 25 | – | 8 | .758 |
| Toledo | 11 | – | 7 | .611 | 21 | – | 12 | .636 |
| Northern Illinois | 10 | – | 8 | .556 | 19 | – | 13 | .594 |
| Eastern Michigan | 6 | – | 12 | .333 | 14 | – | 17 | .452 |
| Western Michigan | 4 | – | 14 | .222 | 10 | – | 20 | .333 |
| Ball State | 3 | – | 15 | .167 | 8 | – | 23 | .258 |
† 2019 MAC tournament winner

The 2018–19 Eastern Michigan Eagles women's basketball team represented Eastern Michigan University during the 2018–19 NCAA Division I women's basketball season. The Eagles, led by third year head coach Fred Castro, played their home games at the Convocation Center, as members of the West Division of the Mid-American Conference. They finished the season 14–17, 6–12 in MAC play to finish in fourth place in the West Division. They advanced to the quarterfinals of the MAC women's tournament, where they lost to Central Michigan.

== Roster ==
2018–19 Eastern Michigan Eagles women's basketball team
Players
Coaches

| Pos. | # | Name | Height | Year | Previous school | Hometown |
|---|---|---|---|---|---|---|
| G | 1 | Toyosi Abiola (redshirt) | 5 ft 7 in (1.7 m) | So | City of London Academy; Iona | London, England |
| G | 2 | Juanita Agosto | 5 ft 6 in (1.68 m) | So | Garfield | Seattle, WA |
| G | 4 | Courtnie Lewis | 5 ft 10 in (1.78 m) | So | Belton | Belton, MO |
| G | 11 | Areanna Combs (redshirt) | 5 ft 10 in (1.78 m) | Jr | Putnam City West; Oklahoma State | Oklahoma City, OK |
| G | 13 | Jenna Annecchiarico | 5 ft 5 in (1.65 m) | Fr | Baldwin | Baldwin, NY |
| G | 14 | Natalia Pineda | 5 ft 9 in (1.75 m) | Fr | John A. Ferguson | Miami, FL |
| G | 20 | Carrione Cardwell | 5 ft 8 in (1.73 m) | RS So | New Tech East | Cleveland, OH |
| F | 21 | Kiara Johnson | 6 ft 2 in (1.88 m) | Fr | Cardinal O'Hara | Buffalo, NY |
| F | 22 | Autumn Hudson | 6 ft 5 in (1.96 m) | So | North Union | Richwood, OH |
| G | 23 | Danielle Minott | 5 ft 8 in (1.73 m) | RS Sr | Miami Country Day; Syracuse | Miami, FL |
| F | 24 | Emoni Jackson | 6 ft 1 in (1.85 m) | RS Sr | Long Beach Polytechnic; Michigan | Los Angeles, CA |
| F | 31 | Lorraine Enabulene | 6 ft 1 in (1.85 m) | RS Sr | Notre Dame Secondary School; Kansas | Ajax, ON |
| F | 32 | RayJon Harris | 6 ft 1 in (1.85 m) | So | Euclid | Euclid, OH |
| G | 34 | Makenna Drabick | 5 ft 9 in (1.75 m) | Fr | Hoover | North Canton, OH |

Head coach

- Fred Castro (Oklahoma)

Assistant coach(es)

- Adam Call (Oklahoma)
- Cassandra Callaway (Daytona State)
- Carlos Adamson (Southwest Baptist)

Legend

- (C) Team captain
- (S) Suspended
- (I) Ineligible
- (W) Walk-on
- Injured
- Current redshirt

Roster

== Schedule ==
| Date time, TV | Rank^{#} | Opponent^{#} | Result | Record | Site (attendance) city, state |
Exhibition
| Nov 1, 2018*; 7:00 pm | | Michigan Tech | L 61–66 | | Convocation Center; Ypsilanti, MI |
Non-conference regular season
| Nov 9, 2018*; 1:30 pm, ESPN3 | | Cleveland State | W 69–63 | 1–0 | Convocation Center (4,776); Ypsilanti, MI |
| Nov 17, 2018*; 12:00 pm, ESPN3 | | Illinois State | W 50–41 | 2–0 | Convocation Center (1,036); Ypsilanti, MI |
| Nov 21, 2018*; 5:00 pm | | vs. Iowa State; Carleton's Homecoming | L 59–85 | 2–1 | Thames Campus Arena (1,021); Chatham, ON |
| Nov 27, 2018*; 11:00 am, ESPN+ | | UIC | W 52–38 | 3–1 | Convocation Center (951); Ypsilanti, MI |
| Dec 1, 2018*; 3:00 pm | | at Illinois | L 66–72 ^{OT} | 3–2 | State Farm Center (1,383); Champaign, IL |
| Dec 7, 2018*; 7:00 pm, ESPN+ | | Detroit Mercy | W 60–53 | 4–2 | Convocation Center (984); Ypsilanti, MI |
| Dec 8, 2018*; 2:00 pm | | at Purdue Fort Wayne | W 87–72 | 5–2 | Hilliard Gates Sports Center (351); Fort Wayne, IN |
| Dec 15, 2018*; 1:00 pm, ESPN+ | | at Longwood | W 64–45 | 6–2 | Willett Hall (109); Farmville, VA |
| Dec 20, 2018*; 4:45 pm | | vs. UNC Greensboro; West Palm Invitational | L 44–49 | 6–3 | Student Life Center (103); West Palm Beach, FL |
| Dec 21, 2018*; 1:00 pm | | vs. Butler; West Palm Invitational | L 63–73 | 6–4 | Student Life Center (79); West Palm Beach, FL |
| Dec 30, 2018*; 2:00 pm, ESPN3 | | Northwood | W 53–39 | 7–4 | Convocation Center (1,172); Ypsilanti, MI |
MAC regular season
| Jan 5, 2019; 5:00 pm, ESPN3 | | at Kent State | L 64–71 | 7–5 (0–1) | MAC Center (1,724); Kent, OH |
| Jan 9, 2019; 7:00 pm, ESPN+ | | Buffalo | L 81–84 ^{OT} | 7–6 (0–2) | Convocation Center (1,114); Ypsilanti, MI |
| Jan 12, 2019; 2:30 pm, ESPN3 | | Western Michigan; Michigan MAC Trophy | W 64–61 | 8–6 (1–2) | Convocation Center (2,865); Ypsilanti, MI |
| Jan 16, 2019; 7:00 pm, ESPN+ | | at Akron | W 72–60 | 9–6 (2–2) | James A. Rhodes Arena (568); Akron, OH |
| Jan 19, 2019; 1:00 pm, ESPN3 | | at Ohio | L 44–85 | 9–7 (2–3) | Convocation Center (648); Athens, OH |
| Jan 23, 2019; 7:00 pm, ESPN+ | | Bowling Green | W 81–74 | 10–7 (3–3) | Convocation Center (1,180); Ypsilanti, MI |
| Jan 26, 2019; 1:00 pm, ESPN+ | | at Central Michigan; Michigan MAC Trophy | L 61–71 | 10–8 (3–4) | McGuirk Arena (2,573); Mount Pleasant, MI |
| Feb 2, 2019; 1:00 pm, ESPN3 | | Northern Illinois | L 65–68 | 10–9 (3–5) | Convocation Center; Ypsilanti, MI |
| Feb 6, 2019; 7:00 pm, ESPN+ | | at Miami (OH) | L 58–63 | 10–10 (3–6) | Millett Hall (396); Oxford, OH |
| Feb 9, 2019; 2:00 pm, ESPN+ | | at Toledo | L 43–63 | 10–11 (3–7) | Savage Arena (4,076); Toledo, OH |
| Feb 13, 2019; 7:00 pm, ESPN+ | | Kent State | L 54–67 | 10–12 (3–8) | Convocation Center (1,086); Ypsilanti, MI |
| Feb 16, 2019; 2:00 pm, ESPN+ | | Ball State | W 56–53 | 11–12 (4–8) | Convocation Center (1,228); Ypsilanti, MI |
| Feb 20, 2019; 7:00 pm, ESPN+ | | Akron | W 67–60 | 12–12 (5–8) | Convocation Center (1,056); Ypsilanti, MI |
| Feb 23, 2019; 2:00 pm, ESPN+ | | at Western Michigan; Michigan MAC Trophy | L 68–71 | 12–13 (5–9) | University Arena (660); Kalamazoo, MI |
| Feb 27, 2019; 7:00 pm, ESPN+ | | at Northern Illinois | L 60–70 | 12–14 (5–10) | Convocation Center (367); DeKalb, IL |
| Mar 2, 2019; 2:00 pm, ESPN3 | | Central Michigan; Michigan MAC Trophy | L 60–87 | 12–15 (5–11) | Convocation Center (1,457); Ypsilanti, MI |
| Mar 6, 2019; 7:00 pm, ESPN+ | | Toledo | L 67–70 ^{2OT} | 12–16 (5–12) | Convocation Center (1,345); Ypsilanti, MI |
| Mar 9, 2019; 2:00 pm, ESPN+ | | at Ball State | W 67–57 | 13–16 (6–12) | Worthen Arena (2,070); Muncie, IN |
MAC Women's Tournament
| Mar 11, 2019; 5:00 pm, ESPN+ | (9) | vs. (8) Akron; First Round | W 61–59 | 14–16 | James A. Rhodes Arena (505); Akron, OH |
| Mar 13, 2019; 12:00 pm, ESPN+ | (9) | vs. (1) Central Michigan; Quarterfinals | L 80–88 ^{OT} | 14–17 | Quicken Loans Arena; Cleveland, OH |
*Non-conference game. ^{#}Rankings from AP Poll. (#) Tournament seedings in parentheses. All times are in Eastern Time.

== See also ==
- 2018–19 Eastern Michigan Eagles men's basketball team
