= 2018–19 Toledo Rockets women's basketball team =

Intercollegiate basketball season

2018–19 Toledo Rockets women's basketball

WNIT, Second Round
- Conference: Mid-American Conference
- West Division
- Record: 21–12 (11–7 MAC)
- Head coach: Tricia Cullop (11th season)
- Assistant coaches: Nitra Perry; Tiffany Swoffard; Danielle Page
- Home arena: Savage Arena

2018–19 Mid-American Conference women's basketball standings
	Conf.				Overall
Team	W		L	PCT	W		L	PCT
East
Ohio	14	–	4	.778	30	–	6	.833
Miami (OH)	13	–	5	.722	23	–	9	.719
Buffalo †	12	–	6	.667	24	–	10	.706
Kent State	11	–	7	.611	20	–	13	.606
Akron	7	–	11	.389	16	–	15	.516
Bowling Green	2	–	16	.111	9	–	21	.300
West
Central Michigan	15	–	3	.833	25	–	8	.758
Toledo	11	–	7	.611	21	–	12	.636
Northern Illinois	10	–	8	.556	19	–	13	.594
Eastern Michigan	6	–	12	.333	14	–	17	.452
Western Michigan	4	–	14	.222	10	–	20	.333
Ball State	3	–	15	.167	8	–	23	.258
† 2019 MAC tournament winner

The 2018–19 Toledo Rockets women's basketball team represented University of Toledo during the 2018–19 NCAA Division I women's basketball season. The Rockets, led by eleventh year head coach Tricia Cullop, played their home games at Savage Arena, as members of the West Division of the Mid-American Conference. They finished the season 21–12, 11–7 in MAC play to finish in second place in the West Division. They advanced to the quarterfinals of the MAC women's tournament, where they lost to Miami (OH). They received an at-large bid to the Women's National Invitation Tournament, where they defeated Seton Hall in the first round before losing to Northwestern in the second round.

== Roster ==
2018–19 Toledo Rockets women's basketball team
Players
Coaches

Pos.	#	Name	Height	Year	Previous school	Hometown
F	1	Sara Rokkanen	5 ft 10 in (1.78 m)	Jr	Mäkelänrinne	Helsinki, Finland
G	2	Mikaela Boyd	5 ft 7 in (1.7 m)	RS Sr	Proviso West	Hillside, IL
G	3	Mariella Santucci	5 ft 6 in (1.68 m)	Jr	Liceo Scientifico Sabin	Bologna, Italy
G/F	5	Sarah St-Fort	5 ft 10 in (1.78 m)	Sr	Dawson College	Montreal, Quebec
F	10	Merveilles Tshitenge	5 ft 10 in (1.78 m)	RS Sr	ESCC; Redlands CC	Neuchâtel, Switzerland
G	12	Tatyana Davis	5 ft 9 in (1.75 m)	So	Morgan County	Madison, GA
G	13	Mariah Copeland	5 ft 9 in (1.75 m)	So	Notre Dame Academy	Toledo, OH
F	14	Tyra Carlsten-Handberg	6 ft 4 in (1.93 m)	RS So	Bromma Gymnasium; UIC	Stockholm, Sweden
C	15	Kaayla McIntyre	6 ft 2 in (1.88 m)	Sr	Notre Dame Academy	Toledo, OH
G	21	Sophia Fortner	5 ft 5 in (1.65 m)	Fr	Wadsworth	Wadsworth, OH
F	23	Tanaya Beacham	6 ft 1 in (1.85 m)	RS So	Toledo Rogers	Youngstown, OH
G	25	Jaela Johnson	5 ft 5 in (1.65 m)	Fr	dePont Manual	Louisville, KY
F	31	Lexi Lance	6 ft 1 in (1.85 m)	Fr	Wadsworth	Wadsworth, OH
G	33	Nakiah Black	5 ft 10 in (1.78 m)	So	Forest Trail Academy; Tallahassee CC	Concord, NC

Head coach

- Tricia Cullop (Purdue)

Assistant coach(es)

- Nitra Perry (Mississippi State)
- Tiffany Swoffard (Austin Peay)
- Danielle Page (Nebraska)

Legend

- (C) Team captain
- (S) Suspended
- (I) Ineligible
- (W) Walk-on
- Injured
- Current redshirt

Roster

== Schedule ==
Date time, TV	Rank^{#}	Opponent^{#}	Result	Record	Site (attendance) city, state
Exhibition
Nov 3, 2018*; 12:00 pm		Findlay	W 77–70 ^{OT}		Savage Arena; Toledo, OH
Dec 30, 2018*; 2:00 pm		Tiffin	W 75–41		Savage Arena; Toledo, OH
Non-conference regular season
Nov 10, 2018*; 1:00 pm, ESPN+		at Maine	L 59–73	0–1	Cross Insurance Center (1,578); Bangor, ME
Nov 14, 2018*; 11:00 am, ESPN+		Iona	W 84–38	1–1	Savage Arena (5,348); Toledo, OH
Nov 18, 2018*; 2:00 pm, ESPN+		Duquesne	W 65–52	2–1	Savage Arena (3,690); Toledo, OH
Nov 21, 2018*; 7:00 pm, ESPN+		at Dayton	L 49–70	2–2	UD Arena (1,669); Dayton, OH
Nov 21, 2018*; 8:00 pm, ESPN+		at Valparaiso	W 65–59	3–2	Athletics–Recreation Center (575); Valparaiso, IN
Nov 28, 2018*; 12:00 pm, ESPN+		at Belmont	W 78–69	4–2	Curb Event Center (2,461); Nashville, TN
Dec 1, 2018*; 12:00 pm		at Memphis	W 58–48	5–2	Elma Roane Fieldhouse (408); Memphis, TN
Dec 5, 2018*; 5:00 pm		at Cleveland State	W 65–60	6–2	Wolstein Center (203); Cleveland, OH
Dec 8, 2018*; 1:00 pm, ESPN+		No. 2 Notre Dame	L 56–72	6–3	Savage Arena (6,059); Toledo, OH
Dec 18, 2018*; 7:00 pm, ESPN3		Stony Brook	W 80–48	7–3	Savage Arena (3,235); Toledo, OH
Dec 21, 2018*; 7:00 pm, ESPN+		Detroit Mercy	W 77–60	8–3	Savage Arena (3,274); Toledo, OH
MAC regular season
Jan 5, 2019; 2:00 pm, ESPN3		Ball State	W 65–58	9–3 (1–0)	Savage Arena (3,473); Toledo, OH
Jan 9, 2019; 7:00 pm, ESPN+		at Miami (OH)	L 64–65	9–4 (1–1)	Millett Hall (275); Miami, OH
Jan 12, 2019; 2:00 pm, ESPN3		Kent State	L 47–58	9–5 (1–2)	Savage Arena (4,071); Toledo, OH
Jan 16, 2019; 7:00 pm, ESPN+		at Western Michigan	W 80–57	10–5 (2–2)	University Arena (513); Kalamazoo, MI
Jan 19, 2019; 2:00 pm, ESPN3		at Bowling Green	W 69–65	11–5 (3–2)	Stroh Center (2,467); Bowling Green, OH
Jan 23, 2019; 7:00 pm, ESPN+		Central Michigan	W 62–59	12–5 (4–2)	Savage Arena (3,603); Toledo, OH
Jan 26, 2019; 2:00 pm, ESPN+		at Akron	L 64–70 ^{OT}	12–6 (4–3)	James A. Rhodes Arena (711); Akron, OH
Feb 2, 2019; 2:00 pm, ESPN3		Bowling Green	W 76–56	13–6 (5–3)	Savage Arena (4,757); Toledo, OH
Feb 6, 2019; 7:00 pm, ESPN+		at Buffalo	L 63–73	13–7 (5–4)	Alumni Arena (1,507); Amherst, NY
Feb 9, 2019; 2:00 pm, ESPN+		Eastern Michigan	W 63–43	14–7 (6–4)	Savage Arena (4,076); Toledo, OH
Feb 13, 2019; 7:00 pm, ESPN+		Ohio	W 76–50	15–7 (7–4)	Savage Arena (3,364); Toledo, OH
Feb 16, 2019; 7:00 pm, ESPN+		at Northern Illinois	L 52–54	15–8 (7–5)	Convocation Center (1,305); DeKalb, IL
Feb 20, 2019; 7:00 pm, ESPN+		Miami (OH)	L 56–65	15–9 (7–6)	Savage Arena (3,704); Toledo, OH
Feb 23, 2019; 4:30 pm, ESPN3		at Ball State	W 63–62	16–9 (8–6)	Worthen Arena (4,834); Muncie, IN
Feb 27, 2019; 7:00 pm, ESPN+		Western Michigan	W 73–63	17–9 (9–6)	Savage Arena (3,377); Toledo, OH
Mar 2, 2019; 2:00 pm, ESPN3		Northern Illinois	W 64–53	18–9 (10–6)	Savage Arena (4,119); Toledo, OH
Mar 6, 2019; 7:00 pm, ESPN+		at Eastern Michigan	W 70–67 ^{2OT}	19–9 (11–6)	Alumni Arena (1,345); Ypsilanti, MI
Mar 9, 2019; 1:00 pm, ESPN+		at Central Michigan	L 45–78	19–10 (11–7)	McGuirk Arena (2,619); Mount Pleasant, MI
MAC Women's Tournament
Mar 11, 2019; 7:00 pm, ESPN+	(6)	(11) Ball State; First Round	W 67–63	20–10	Savage Arena (4,059); Toledo, OH
Mar 13, 2019; 7:30 pm, ESPN+	(6)	vs. (3) Miami (OH); Quarterfinals	L 54–72	20–11	Quicken Loans Arena; Cleveland, OH
WNIT
Mar 21, 2019*; 7:00 pm, ESPN3		Seton Hall; First Round	W 71–65	21–11	Savage Arena (1,289); Toledo, OH
Mar 24, 2019*; 2:00 pm, ESPN3		Northwestern; Second Round	L 47–54	21–12	Savage Arena (1,879); Toledo, OH
*Non-conference game. ^{#}Rankings from AP Poll. (#) Tournament seedings in parentheses. All times are in Eastern Time.

== See also ==
- 2018–19 Toledo Rockets men's basketball team
