= Saint Joseph Academy (Cleveland, Ohio) =

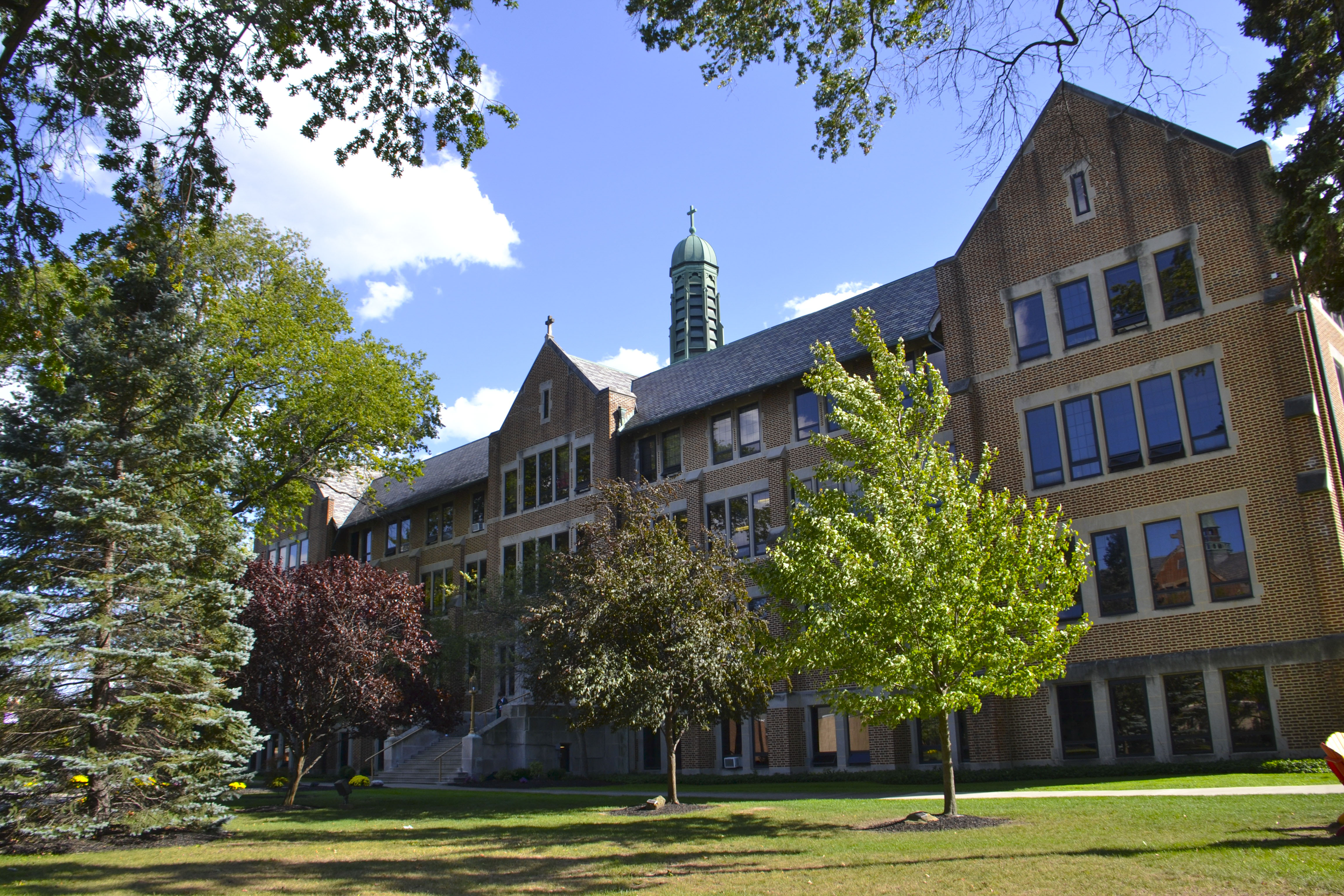
- Fall 2016 at Saint Joseph Academy

Location
- 3470 Rocky River Drive; Cleveland, (Cuyahoga County), Ohio 44111; United States; 41°27′36″N 81°49′3″W

Information
- Type: Private, Day, College-prep
- Motto: Sursum Corda (Lift Up Your Hearts)
- Religious affiliation: Roman Catholic
- Established: 1890
- Founder: The Sisters of the Congregation of St. Joseph
- Oversight: Sisters of the Congregation of St. Joseph
- President: Kathryn H. Purcell
- Principal: Jeff Sutliff
- Grades: 9–12
- Gender: Girls
- Average class size: 19
- Campus size: 44 acres (180,000 m^{2})
- Colors: Purple and Gold
- Sports: Cross country, soccer, volleyball, golf, tennis, basketball, bowling, swimming & diving, indoor track, softball, track & field, crew, lacrosse, sailing, gymnastics and rugby
- Mascot: Josie the Jaguar
- Team name: Jaguars
- Accreditation: North Central Association of Colleges and Schools
- Website: http://www.sja1890.org/

Saint Joseph Academy is the only all-female Catholic high school located in Cleveland, Ohio. It is located in the Roman Catholic Diocese of Cleveland. An Associate of the Congregation of St. Joseph serves as Vice President of Mission, and seven faculty and staff members are Associates of the Congregation of St. Joseph.

== Background ==
Saint Joseph Academy was established in 1890 by the Congregation of St. Joseph. The Academy is owned and operated by the Congregation of St. Joseph, and it is advised by a board of directors representing religious, corporate and nonprofit professionals. The Academy is the only all-girls Catholic high school in the city of Cleveland. Forty percent of the students are residents of Cleveland, and 43% of students are legacies. The student-body represents 62 zip codes.

== Athletics ==
Saint Joseph Academy is home to 15 varsity interscholastic athletic programs, including Basketball, Bowling, Crew, Cross Country, Golf, Gymnastics, Indoor Track, Lacrosse, Rugby, Soccer, Softball, Swimming & Diving, Tennis, Track & Field and Volleyball.

During the 2019-20 school year, 55% of students were a member of an athletics team. The average GPA for student-athletes during 2019-20 was 3.69.

Saint Joseph Academy competes in the Ohio High School Athletic Association.

Volleyball has competed in the OHSAA Division I Final Four multiple seasons including a State Runner-Up finish in 2017. Cross Country captured North Coast League Title and had five post-season honors; one runner was All-Ohio. The Crew team had Varsity 4+ and Lightweight 4+ compete at the SRAA National Championship, placing 10th and 5th in the country in the 2018-19 season. In 2019, one lacrosse student-athlete was named Academic All-American and captured the North Coast League Title in 2019. Softball posted 21 wins and featured 25 post-season awards, including All-Ohio selection in the 2019 season. The Rugby team is 2010, 2011, 2013, 2014, 2015, 2016 and 2017 State champions. In addition, Rugby won a National Championship in 2016.

== Notable alumnae ==
- Maura Corrigan ’65, retired Chief Justice, Michigan Supreme Court
- Patty Donahue, new wave singer and lead vocalist of The Waitresses
- Mary Jordan, a reporter for the Washington Post and co-winner of the 2003 Pulitzer Prize in Journalism
- Bride Sweeney ’10, State Representative, Ohio House of Representatives; first woman elected to represent the 14th House District

== See also ==
- St. Joseph Convent and Academy Complex
