= 2019 NCAA Division I women's basketball tournament =

Basketball tournament

- Season: 2018–19
- Teams: 64
- Finals site: Amalie Arena, Tampa, Florida
- Champions: Baylor Lady Bears (3rd title, 3rd title game, 4th Final Four)
- Runner-up: Notre Dame Fighting Irish (7th title game, 9th Final Four)
- Semifinalists: UConn Huskies (20th Final Four); Oregon Ducks (1st Final Four)
- Winning coach: Kim Mulkey (3rd title)
- MOP: Chloe Jackson (Baylor)

The 2019 NCAA Division I women's basketball tournament was a single-elimination tournament of 64 teams to determine the national champion for the 2018–19 NCAA Division I women's basketball season. The 38th annual edition of the tournament began on March 22, and concluded with the championship game on April 7 at Amalie Arena in Tampa, Florida, with the University of South Florida serving as host. The tournament field was announced on March 18.

Three schools, Colonial champion Towson, MEAC champion Bethune–Cookman and Southland champion Abilene Christian, made their first appearance in the tournament. Meanwhile, Tennessee continued its record streak of making every NCAA women's basketball tournament at 38 consecutive appearances. UConn also continued its record streak of 12 consecutive Final Four appearances.

== Tournament procedure ==
Pending any changes to the format, a total of 64 teams will enter the 2019 tournament. 32 automatic bids shall be awarded to each program that wins their conference's tournament. The remaining 36 bids are "at-large", with selections extended by the NCAA Selection Committee. The tournament is split into four regional tournaments, and each regional has teams seeded from 1 to 16, with the committee ostensibly making every region as comparable to the others as possible. The top-seeded team in each region plays the #16 team, the #2 team plays the #15, etc. (meaning where the two seeds add up to 17, that team will be assigned to play another).

The selection committee will also seed the entire field from 1 to 64.

== Schedule and venues ==
The first two rounds, also referred to as the subregionals, were played at the sites of the top 16 seeds, as was done since 2015. However, the subregional that would otherwise have been hosted by South Carolina was moved to Charlotte, North Carolina due to the Gamecocks' home, Colonial Life Arena, being used for the men's tournament.

Subregionals (first and second rounds)

- March 22–24
  - KFC Yum! Center, Louisville, Kentucky (Host: University of Louisville)
  - Dale F. Halton Arena, Charlotte, North Carolina (Host: University of North Carolina at Charlotte)
  - Carver-Hawkeye Arena, Iowa City, Iowa (Host: University of Iowa)
  - Reed Arena, College Station, Texas (Host: Texas A&M University)
  - Harry A. Gampel Pavilion, Storrs, Connecticut (Host: University of Connecticut)
  - Watsco Center, Coral Gables, Florida (Host: University of Miami)
  - Humphrey Coliseum, Starkville, Mississippi (Host: Mississippi State University)
  - Matthew Knight Arena, Eugene, Oregon (Host: University of Oregon)
- March 23–25
  - Edmund P. Joyce Center, Notre Dame, Indiana (Host: University of Notre Dame)
  - Xfinity Center, College Park, Maryland (Host: University of Maryland)
  - Reynolds Coliseum, Raleigh, North Carolina (Host: North Carolina State University)
  - Carrier Dome, Syracuse, New York (Host: Syracuse University)
  - Maples Pavilion, Stanford, California (Host: Stanford University)
  - Hilton Coliseum, Ames, Iowa (Host: Iowa State University)
  - Gill Coliseum, Corvallis, Oregon (Host: Oregon State University)
  - Ferrell Center, Waco, Texas (Host: Baylor University)
2019 NCAA regionals and Final Four

Regional semifinals and finals (Sweet Sixteen and Elite Eight)

- March 29-April 1
  - Albany regional, Times Union Center, Albany, New York (Hosts: MAAC)
  - Chicago regional, Wintrust Arena, Chicago, Illinois (Host: DePaul)
  - Greensboro regional, Greensboro Coliseum, Greensboro, North Carolina (Host: Atlantic Coast Conference)
  - Portland regional, Moda Center, Portland, Oregon (Host: Oregon State)

National semifinals and championship (Final Four and championship)

- April 5 and April 7
  - Amalie Arena, Tampa, Florida (Host: University of South Florida)

This is the third time that the women's Final Four was played in Tampa (previously, in 2008 and 2015).

== Subregionals tournament and automatic qualifiers ==
=== Automatic qualifiers ===
The following teams automatically qualified for the 2019 NCAA field by virtue of winning their conference's tournament.

Conference	Team	Record	Appearance	Last bid
ACC	Notre Dame	30–3	26th	2018
America East	Maine	25–7	9th	2018
American	UConn	31–2	31st	2018
Atlantic 10	Fordham	25–8	3rd	2014
ASUN	Florida Gulf Coast	27–4	6th	2018
Big 12	Baylor	31–1	18th	2018
Big East	DePaul	25–7	24th	2018
Big Sky	Portland State	25–7	2nd	2010
Big South	Radford	25–6	4th	1996
Big Ten	Iowa	26–6	26th	2018
Big West	UC Davis	25–6	2nd	2011
Colonial	Towson	20–12	1st	Never
C-USA	Rice	28–3	3rd	2005
Horizon	Wright State	27–6	2nd	2014
Ivy League	Princeton	22–9	8th	2018
MAAC	Quinnipiac	26–6	5th	2018
MAC	Buffalo	23–9	3rd	2018
MEAC	Bethune–Cookman	21–10	1st	Never
Missouri Valley	Missouri State	23–9	15th	2016
Mountain West	Boise State	28–4	6th	2018
Northeast	Robert Morris	22–10	6th	2017
Ohio Valley	Belmont	26–6	5th	2018
Pac-12	Stanford	28–4	33rd	2018
Patriot	Bucknell	28–5	4th	2017
SEC	Mississippi State	30–2	11th	2018
Southern	Mercer	25–7	2nd	2018
Southland	Abilene Christian	23–9	1st	Never
SWAC	Southern	20–12	5th	2010
Summit League	South Dakota State	26–6	9th	2018
Sun Belt	Little Rock	21–10	6th	2018
West Coast	BYU	25–6	13th	2016
WAC	New Mexico State	26-6	6th	2017

=== Tournament seeds ===
Albany regional – Times Union Center, Albany, New York
Seed	School	Conference	Record	RPI	Berth type
1	Louisville	ACC	29–3	3	At-large
2	UConn	American	31–2	6	Automatic
3	Maryland	Big Ten	28–4	14	At-large
4	Oregon State	Pac-12	24–7	24	At-Large
5	Gonzaga	West Coast	28–4	13	At-Large
6	UCLA	Pac-12	20–12	35	At-Large
7	Rutgers	Big Ten	22–9	29	At-Large
8	Michigan	Big Ten	21–11	46	At-Large
9	Kansas State	Big 12	21–11	33	At-Large
10	Buffalo	MAC	23–9	25	Automatic
11	Tennessee	SEC	19–12	60	At-Large
12	Little Rock	Sun Belt	21–10	61	Automatic
13	Boise State	Mountain West	28–4	39	Automatic
14	Radford	Big South	26–6	75	Automatic
15	Towson	Colonial	20–12	107	Automatic
16	Robert Morris	Northeast	24–9	173	Automatic

Greensboro regional – Greensboro Coliseum, Greensboro, North Carolina
Seed	School	Conference	Record	RPI	Berth type
1	Baylor	Big 12	31–1	2	Automatic
2	Iowa	Big Ten	26–6	7	Automatic
3	NC State	ACC	26–5	9	At-Large
4	South Carolina	SEC	21–9	17	At-Large
5	Florida State	ACC	23–8	21	At-Large
6	Kentucky	SEC	23–7	22	At-Large
7	Missouri	SEC	23–10	30	At-Large
8	California	Pac-12	19–12	42	At-Large
9	North Carolina	ACC	18–14	38	At-Large
10	Drake	Missouri Valley	27–6	20	At-Large
11	Princeton	Ivy	22–9	44	Automatic
12	Bucknell	Patriot	28–4	37	Automatic
13	Belmont	Ohio Valley	26–6	47	Automatic
14	Maine	America East	25–7	54	Automatic
15	Mercer	Southern	25–7	132	Automatic
16	Abilene Christian	Southland	23–9	124	Automatic

Chicago regional – Wintrust Arena, Chicago, Illinois
Seed	School	Conference	Record	RPI	Berth type
1	Notre Dame	ACC	30–3	1	Automatic
2	Stanford	Pac-12	28–4	4	Automatic
3	Iowa State	Big 12	25–8	11	At-Large
4	Texas A&M	SEC	24–8	16	At-Large
5	Marquette	Big East	26–7	12	At-Large
6	DePaul	Big East	26–7	18	Automatic
7	BYU	West Coast	25–6	26	Automatic
8	Central Michigan	MAC	25–7	32	At-Large
9	Michigan State	Big Ten	20–11	43	At-Large
10	Auburn	SEC	22–9	50	At-Large
11	Missouri State	Missouri Valley	23–9	52	Automatic
12	Rice	C-USA	28–3	31	Automatic
13	Wright State	Horizon	27–6	59	Automatic
14	New Mexico State	WAC	26–6	125	Automatic
15	UC Davis	Big West	25–6	72	Automatic
16	Bethune–Cookman	MEAC	21–10	201	Automatic

Portland regional – Moda Center, Portland, Oregon
Seed	School	Conference	Record	RPI	Berth type
1	Mississippi State	SEC	30–2	8	Automatic
2	Oregon	Pac-12	29–4	5	At-Large
3	Syracuse	ACC	24–8	10	At-Large
4	Miami (FL)	ACC	24–8	19	At-Large
5	Arizona State	Pac-12	20–10	23	At-Large
6	South Dakota State	Summit	26–6	27	Automatic
7	Texas	Big 12	23–9	28	At-Large
8	South Dakota	Summit	28–5	40	At-Large
9	Clemson	ACC	19–12	51	At-Large
10	Indiana	Big Ten	20–12	48	At-Large
11	Quinnipiac	MAAC	28–4	41	Automatic
12	UCF	American	26–6	15	At-Large
13	Florida Gulf Coast	Atlantic Sun	28–4	63	Automatic
14	Fordham	Atlantic 10	25–8	82	Automatic
15	Portland State	Big Sky	25–7	106	Automatic
16	Southern	SWAC	20–12	152	Automatic

== Tournament records ==
- Baylor recorded 217 field goals, setting the record for most field goals made in a single tournament.

== Bracket ==
All times are listed as Eastern Daylight Time (UTC−4)
* – Denotes overtime period

=== Albany regional – Albany, New York ===
First round Round of 64; March 22–23
1	Louisville	69
16	Robert Morris	34
Louisville, Kentucky (Fri/Sun)
8	Michigan	84
9	Kansas State	54
5	Gonzaga	68
12	Little Rock	51
Corvallis, Oregon (Sat/Mon)
4	Oregon State	80*
13	Boise State	75
6	UCLA	89
11	Tennessee	77
College Park, MD (Sat/Mon)
3	Maryland	73
14	Radford	51
7	Rutgers	71
10	Buffalo	82
Storrs, Connecticut (Fri/Sun)
2	UConn	110
15	Towson	61

Second round Round of 32; March 24–25
1	Louisville	71
8	Michigan	50
5	Gonzaga	70
4	Oregon State	76
6	UCLA	85
3	Maryland	80
10	Buffalo	72
2	UConn	84

Regional semifinals Sweet 16; March 29
1	Louisville	61
4	Oregon State	44
6	UCLA	61
2	UConn	69

Regional final Elite 8 March 31
1	Louisville	73
2	UConn	80

* – Denotes overtime period

==== Albany regional final ====
ESPN

March 31
12:00 pm

Box Score

#2 UConn Huskies 80, #1 Louisville Cardinals 73
Scoring by quarter: 22–16, 19–18, 16–19, 23–20
Pts: K. L. Samuelson – 29; Rebs: N. Collier – 13; Asts: N. Collier – 6	Pts: A. Durr – 21; Rebs: A. Durr – 9 Asts: J. Jones – 6

Times Union Center – Albany, New York
Attendance: 9,204
Referees: Cheryl Flores, Maj Forsberg, Dee Kanter

==== Albany Regional all tournament team ====
- Napheesa Collier, UConn (MOP)
- Katie Lou Samuelson, UConn
- Crystal Dangerfield, UConn
- Asia Durr, Louisville
- Sam Fuehring, Louisville

=== Chicago regional – Chicago, Illinois ===
First round Round of 64; March 22–23
1	Notre Dame	92
16	Bethune-Cookman	50
South Bend, Indiana (Sat/Mon)
8	Central Michigan	88
9	Michigan State	89
5	Marquette	58*
12	Rice	54
College Station, Texas (Fri/Sun)
4	Texas A&M	84
13	Wright State	61
6	DePaul	78
11	Missouri State	89
Ames, Iowa (Sat/Mon)
3	Iowa State	97
14	New Mexico State	61
7	BYU	73
10	Auburn	64
Stanford, California (Sat/Mon)
2	Stanford	79
15	UC Davis	54

Second round Round of 32; March 24–25
1	Notre Dame	91
9	Michigan State	63
5	Marquette	76
4	Texas A&M	78
11	Missouri State	69
3	Iowa State	60
7	BYU	63
2	Stanford	72

Regional semifinals Sweet 16; March 30
1	Notre Dame	87
4	Texas A&M	80
11	Missouri State	46
2	Stanford	55

Regional final Elite 8 April 1
1	Notre Dame	84
2	Stanford	68

* – Denotes overtime period

==== Chicago regional final ====
ESPN2

April 1
9:00 pm

Box Score

#2 Stanford Cardinal 68, #1 Notre Dame Fighting Irish 84
Scoring by quarter: 13–11, 20–15, 13–26, 22–32
Pts: K. Williams – 20; Rebs: A. Smith – 8 Asts: A. Smith – 4	Pts: J. Young – 25; Rebs: J. Shepard – 14; Asts: M. Mabrey – 6

Wintrust Arena – Chicago, Illinois
Attendance: 5,555
Referees: Infini Robinson, Roy Gulbeyan, Brenda Pantoja

==== Chicago Regional all tournament team ====
- Arike Ogunbowale, Notre Dame (MOP)
- Jessica Shepard, Notre Dame
- Alanna Smith, Stanford
- Kiana Williams, Stanford
- Chennedy Carter, Texas A&M

=== Greensboro regional – Greensboro, North Carolina ===
First round Round of 64; March 22–23
1	Baylor	95
16	Abilene Christian	38
Waco, Texas (Sat/Mon)
8	California	92
9	North Carolina	72
5	Florida State	70
12	Bucknell	67
Charlotte, North Carolina (Fri/Sun)
4	South Carolina	74
13	Belmont	52
6	Kentucky	82
11	Princeton	77
Raleigh, North Carolina (Sat/Mon)
3	NC State	63
14	Maine	51
7	Missouri	77*
10	Drake	76
Iowa City, Iowa (Fri/Sun)
2	Iowa	66
15	Mercer	61

Second round Round of 32; March 24–25
1	Baylor	102
8	California	63
5	Florida State	64
4	South Carolina	72
6	Kentucky	57
3	NC State	72
7	Missouri	52
2	Iowa	68

Regional semifinals Sweet 16; March 30
1	Baylor	93
4	South Carolina	68
3	NC State	61
2	Iowa	79

Regional final Elite 8 April 1
1	Baylor	85
2	Iowa	53

* – Denotes overtime period

==== Greensboro regional final ====
ESPN2

April 1
7:00 pm

Box Score

#2 Iowa Hawkeyes 53, #1 Baylor Lady Bears 85
Scoring by quarter: 13–21, 14–20, 15–24, 11–20
Pts: M. Gustafson – 23; Rebs: M. Gustafson – 9 Asts: K. Doyle, H. Stewart 4	Pts: L. Cox – 22; Rebs: L. Cox – 11; Asts: D. Richards – 6

Greensboro Coliseum – Greensboro, North Carolina
Attendance: 4,164
Referees: Cynthia Brooks, Joseph Vaszily, Amy Bonner

==== Greensboro Regional all tournament team ====
- Lauren Cox, Baylor (MOP)
- DiDi Richards, Baylor
- Chloe Jackson, Baylor
- Kalani Brown, Baylor
- Megan Gustafson, Iowa

=== Portland regional – Portland, Oregon ===
First round Round of 64; March 22–23
1	Mississippi State	103
16	Southern	46
Starkville, Mississippi (Fri/Sun)
8	South Dakota	66
9	Clemson	79
5	Arizona State	60
12	UCF	45
Coral Gables, Florida (Fri/Sun)
4	Miami (FL)	69
13	Florida Gulf Coast	62
6	South Dakota State	76
11	Quinnipiac	65
Syracuse, New York (Sat/Mon)
3	Syracuse	70
14	Fordham	49
7	Texas	65
10	Indiana	69
Eugene, Oregon (Fri/Sun)
2	Oregon	78
15	Portland State	40

Second round Round of 32; March 24–25
1	Mississippi State	85
9	Clemson	61
5	Arizona State	57
4	Miami (FL)	55
6	South Dakota State	75
3	Syracuse	64
10	Indiana	68
2	Oregon	91

Regional semifinals Sweet 16; March 29
1	Mississippi State	76
5	Arizona State	53
6	South Dakota State	53
2	Oregon	63

Regional final Elite 8 March 31
1	Mississippi State	84
2	Oregon	88

==== Portland regional final ====
ESPN

March 31
2:00 pm

Box Score

#2 Oregon Ducks 88, #1 Mississippi State Bulldogs 84
Scoring by quarter: 19–21, 21–17, 19–21, 29–25
Pts: S. Ionescu – 31; Rebs: S. Ionescu, S. Sabally – 7 Asts: S. Ionescu – 8	Pts: T. McCowan – 19; Rebs: T. McCowan – 15; Asts: J. Holmes – 13

Moda Center – Portland, Oregon
Attendance: 11,538
Referees: Mark Zentz, Michol Murray, Pualani Spurlock

==== Portland Regional all tournament team ====
- Sabrina Ionescu, Oregon (MOP)
- Satou Sabally, Oregon
- Ruthy Hebard, Oregon
- Teaira McCowan, Mississippi State
- Anriel Howard, Mississippi State

== Final Four ==
During the Final Four round, regardless of the seeds of the participating teams, the champion of the top overall top seed's region (Baylor's Greensboro Region) plays against the champion of the fourth-ranked top seed's region (Mississippi State's Portland Region), and the champion of the second overall top seed's region (Notre Dame's Chicago Region) plays against the champion of the third-ranked top seed's region (Louisville's Albany Region).

=== Amalie Arena – Tampa, Florida ===
National semifinals Final Four; April 5
G1	Baylor	72
P2	Oregon	67
C1	Notre Dame	81
A2	UConn	76

National championship game April 7
G1	Baylor	82
C1	Notre Dame	81

==== National semifinals ====
ESPN2

Friday, April 5
7:00 pm

Box Score

P#2 Oregon Ducks 67, G#1 Baylor Lady Bears 72
Scoring by quarter: 15–19, 19–14, 21–23, 12–16
Pts: S. Ionescu – 18; Rebs: R. Hebard – 10; Asts: S. Ionescu – 4	Pts: K. Brown – 22; Rebs: L. Cox – 10; Asts: L. Cox – 7

Amalie Arena – Tampa, Florida
Attendance: 20,062
Referees: Cheryl Flores, Michael McConnell, Lisa Jones

ESPN2

Friday, April 5
9:30 pm

Box Score

A#2 Connecticut Huskies 76, C#1 Notre Dame Fighting Irish 81
Scoring by quarter: 16–12, 14–17, 24–23, 22–29
Pts: K. L. Samuelson, 20; Rebs: N. Collier, 13; Asts: C. Dangerfield, 9	Pts: A. Ogunbowale, 23; Rebs: B. Turner, 15; Asts: M. Mabrey, 12

Amalie Arena – Tampa, Florida
Attendance: 20,062
Referees: Beverly Roberts, Michol Murray, Joe Vaszily

==== National championship ====
ESPN

April 7, 2019
6:00 pm EDT

Box Score

C#1 Notre Dame Fighting Irish 81, G#1 Baylor Lady Bears 82
Scoring by quarter: 14–25, 17–18, 24–23, 26–16
Pts: A. Ogunbowale – 31; Rebs: B. Turner – 12; Asts: J. Young – 6 Stls: A. Ogunbowale – 2	Pts: C. Jackson – 26; Rebs: K. Brown – 13; Asts: J. Landrum, D. Richards – 6 Stls: D. Richards, C. Jackson – 2

Amalie Arena, Tampa, FL
Attendance: 20,127
Referees: Dee Kantner, Brenda Pantoja, Maj Forsberg

==== Final Four all-tournament team ====
- Chloe Jackson (MOP), Baylor
- Kalani Brown, Baylor
- Lauren Cox, Baylor
- Marina Mabrey, Notre Dame
- Arike Ogunbowale, Notre Dame

== Record by conference ==
Conference	Bids	Record	Win %	R64	R32	S16	E8	F4	CG	NC
Big 12	4	7–3	.700	4	2	1	1	1	1	1
ACC	8	14–8	.636	8	7	3	2	1	1	–
American	2	4–2	.667	2	1	1	1	1	–	–
Pac-12	6	14–6	.700	6	6	5	2	1	–	–
Big Ten	6	7–6	.538	6	5	1	1	–	–	–
SEC	7	9–7	.563	7	5	3	1	–	–	–
Missouri Valley	2	2–2	.500	2	1	1	–	–	–	–
Summit League	2	2–2	.500	2	1	1	–	–	–	–
Big East	2	1–2	.333	2	1	–	–	–	–	–
Mid-American	2	1–2	.333	2	1	–	–	–	–	–
WCC	2	2–2	.500	2	2	–	–	–	–	–

- The R64, R32, S16, E8, F4, CG, and NC columns indicate how many teams from each conference were in the round of 64 (first round), round of 32 (second round), Sweet 16, Elite Eight, Final Four, championship game, and national champion, respectively.
- The America East, Atlantic 10, Atlantic Sun, Big Sky, Big South, Big West, Conference USA, Colonial, Horizon, Ivy League, MAAC, MEAC, Mountain West, Northeast, Ohio Valley, Patriot, Southern, Southland, Sun Belt, SWAC and WAC conferences each had one representative that was eliminated in the first round.

== Media coverage ==
=== Television ===
The tournament was covered by ESPN's networks. During the first and second rounds, ESPN aired select games nationally on ESPN2, ESPNU, and ESPNews. All other games aired regionally on ESPN, ESPN2, or ESPN3 and were streamed online via WatchESPN. Most of the nation got whip-a-round coverage during this time, which allowed ESPN to rotate between the games and focus the nation on the game that had the closest score. Over the course of rebroadcasting a studio program discussing the men's tournament, ESPNU accidentally displayed on-screen graphics prematurely revealing the tournament bracket prior to its formal unveiling that evening. The NCAA officially released the brackets two hours earlier than scheduled. Some watch parties for schools scheduled with the bracket reveal were cancelled, and ESPN apologized for the error.

==== Studio host and analysts ====
- Maria Taylor (Host)
- Andy Landers (Analyst)
- Rebecca Lobo (Analyst) (First, Second rounds, Final Four and National championship game)
- Nell Fortner (Analyst) (Regionals, Final Four and National championship game)

==== Broadcast assignments ====
First & second rounds Friday/Sunday

- Beth Mowins and Nell Fortner – Louisville, Kentucky
- Eric Frede and Christy Thomaskutty – Charlotte, North Carolina
- John Brickley and Christy Winters-Scott – Iowa City, Iowa
- Lowell Galindo and A'ja Wilson – College Station, Texas
- Adam Amin and Kara Lawson – Storrs, Connecticut
- Clay Matvick and Julianne Viani – Coral Gables, Florida
- Paul Sunderland and Steffi Sorensen – Starkville, Mississippi
- Dave Pasch and LaChina Robinson – Eugene, Oregon

Sweet Sixteen & Elite Eight Friday/Sunday

- Adam Amin, Kara Lawson, Rebecca Lobo, and Holly Rowe – Albany, New York
- Dave Pasch, LaChina Robinson, and Brooke Weisbrod – Portland, Oregon

Final Four

- Adam Amin, Kara Lawson, Rebecca Lobo, and Holly Rowe – Tampa, Florida

First & second rounds Saturday/Monday

- Courtney Lyle and Tamika Catchings – Notre Dame, Indiana
- Roy Philpott and Brooke Weisbrod – College Park, Maryland
- Melissa Lee and Mike Thibault – Raleigh, North Carolina
- Sam Gore and Blair Schaefer – Syracuse, New York
- Elise Woodward and Dan Hughes – Stanford, California
- Brenda VanLengen and Andraya Carter – Ames, Iowa
- Tiffany Greene and Mary Murphy – Corvallis, Oregon
- Pam Ward and Carolyn Peck – Waco, Texas

Sweet Sixteen & Elite Eight Saturday/Monday

- Pam Ward, Carolyn Peck, and Allison Williams – Greensboro, North Carolina
- Beth Mowins, Debbie Antonelli, and Courtney Lyle – Chicago, Illinois

Championship

- Adam Amin, Kara Lawson, Rebecca Lobo, and Holly Rowe – Tampa, Florida

=== Radio ===
Westwood One had exclusive radio rights to the entire tournament. Teams participating in the Regional finals, Final Four, and Championship were allowed to have their own local broadcasts, but they weren’t allowed to stream those broadcasts online.

Regional finals Sunday

- John Sadak and Julianne Viani – Albany, New York
- John Ramey and Kristen Kozlowski – Portland, Oregon

Final Four

- John Sadak, Debbie Antonelli, and Krista Blunk – Tampa, Florida

Regional finals Monday

- Justin Kutcher and Kim Adams – Greensboro, North Carolina
- Ted Emrich and Krista Blunk – Chicago, Illinois

Championship

- John Sadak, Debbie Antonelli, and Krista Blunk – Tampa, Florida

== See also ==
- 2019 NCAA Division I men's basketball tournament
- 2019 NCAA Division II men's basketball tournament
- 2019 NCAA Division III men's basketball tournament
- 2019 NCAA Division II women's basketball tournament
- 2019 Women's National Invitation Tournament
- 2019 U Sports Women's Basketball Championship
- 2019 National Invitation Tournament
- 2019 NAIA Division I women's basketball tournament
- 2019 NAIA Division II women's basketball tournament
- 2019 NAIA Division I men's basketball tournament
- 2019 NAIA Division II men's basketball tournament
- 2019 Women's Basketball Invitational
- 2019 College Basketball Invitational
- 2019 CollegeInsider.com Postseason Tournament
