= 2018–19 Denver Pioneers women's basketball team =

Intercollegiate basketball season

2018–19 Denver Pioneers women's basketball

WNIT, second round
- Conference: The Summit League
- Record: 18–14 (10–6 The Summit)
- Head coach: Jim Turgeon (2nd season)
- Assistant coaches: Kayla Ard; Terra Moyers; Tommie Johnson
- Home arena: Magness Arena; Hamilton Gymnasium

2018–19 Summit League women's basketball standings
	Conf.				Overall
Team	W		L	PCT	W		L	PCT
South Dakota State †	15	–	1	.938	28	–	7	.800
South Dakota	14	–	2	.875	28	–	6	.824
Oral Roberts	10	–	6	.625	18	–	13	.581
Denver	10	–	6	.625	18	–	14	.563
Western Illinois	8	–	8	.500	12	–	18	.400
North Dakota	6	–	10	.375	12	–	19	.387
North Dakota State	4	–	12	.250	7	–	22	.241
Purdue Fort Wayne	3	–	13	.188	7	–	22	.241
Omaha	2	–	14	.125	8	–	21	.276
† 2019 Summit League Tournament winner Rankings from AP Poll

The 2018–19 Denver Pioneers women's basketball team represented the University of Denver in the 2018–19 NCAA Division I women's basketball season. The Pioneers, led second-year head coach Jim Turgeon, played their home games at Hamilton Gymnasium with one game at Magness Arena, both in Denver, Colorado, and were members of the Summit League. They finished the season 18–14, 10–6 in Summit League, play to finish in a tie for third place. They lost in the quarterfinals of the Summit League women's tournament to North Dakota. They received an automatic bid to the Women's National Invitation Tournament, where they defeated New Mexico in the first round before losing to Idaho in the second round.

== Roster ==
2018–19 Denver Pioneers women's basketball team
Players
Coaches

Pos.	#	Name	Height	Year	Previous school	Hometown
G/F	0	Abi Curtin	6 ft 1 in (1.85 m)	Jr	Mount St Benedict College	Sydney, Australia
F	1	Grace White	5 ft 10 in (1.78 m)	So	Red Lake	Redby, MN
G	2	Briana Johnson	5 ft 6 in (1.68 m)	Jr	Serra	Carson, CA
G	3	Lauren Loven	5 ft 7 in (1.7 m)	Jr	Notre Dame Prep	Scottsdale, AZ
G	5	Anna Jackson	6 ft 0 in (1.83 m)	Fr	Flower Mound	Flower Mound, TX
G	10	Haley Simental	5 ft 8 in (1.73 m)	RS Jr	Pueblo West; Colorado Connections Academy	Pueblo West, CO
G	12	Claire Gritt	5 ft 10 in (1.78 m)	So	John Hersey	Arlington Heights, IL
C	15	Courtney Smith	6 ft 3 in (1.91 m)	Jr	Legacy	Thornton, CO
G	22	Samantha Romanowski	5 ft 9 in (1.75 m)	Sr	Mountlake Terrace	Mountlake Terrace, WA
F	23	Madison Nelson	6 ft 1 in (1.85 m)	Jr	Dover-Eyota	Dover, MN
G/F	25	Sydney Mech	6 ft 2 in (1.88 m)	Fr	Cherry Creek	Englewood, CO
G	32	Tsimba Malonga	5 ft 8 in (1.73 m)	Fr	Benet Academy	Bolingbrook, IL
F	33	Jasmine Jeffcoat	6 ft 2 in (1.88 m)	So	Monarch	Louisville, CO

Head coach

- Jim Turgeon (Washburn)

Assistant coach(es)

- Kayla Ard (Southeastern Louisiana)
- Terra Moyers (Saint Mary's)
- Tommie Johnson (Colorado–Colorado Springs)

Legend

- (C) Team captain
- (S) Suspended
- (I) Ineligible
- (W) Walk-on
- Injured
- Current redshirt

Roster
Last update: May 6, 2025

== Schedule ==
Date time, TV	Rank^{#}	Opponent^{#}	Result	Record	Site (attendance) city, state
Exhibition
November 3, 2018*; 6:00 p.m.		Taylor	W 106–66		Ritchie Center; Denver, CO
Non-conference regular season
November 9, 2018*; 7:00 p.m.		UMKC	W 92–75	1–0	Hamilton Gymnasium (431); Denver, CO
November 11, 2018*; 1:00 p.m.		Air Force	W 92–66	2–0	Hamilton Gymnasium (386); Denver, CO
November 16, 2018*; 7:00 p.m.		at Northern Colorado	L 66–74	2–1	Bank of Colorado Arena (1,162); Greeley, CO
November 19, 2018*; 1:00 p.m.		American	W 83–54	3–1	Hamilton Gymnasium (530); Denver, CO
November 23, 2018*; 3:30 p.m.		Lamar; Denver Thanksgiving Classic	W 117–110 ^{2OT}	4–1	Hamilton Gymnasium (370); Denver, CO
November 24, 2018*; 3:30 p.m.		St. Bonaventure; Denver Thanksgiving Classic	W 76–62	5–1	Hamilton Gymnasium (239); Denver, CO
December 1, 2018*; 1:00 p.m.		Loyola Marymount	W 104–75	6–1	Hamilton Gymnasium (310); Denver, CO
December 4, 2018*; 6:30 p.m.		at Wyoming	L 74–78	6–2	Arena-Auditorium (2,374); Laramie, WY
December 8, 2018*; 1:00 p.m.		at Southern Utah	W 71–70	7–2	America First Events Center (857); Cedar City, UT
December 11, 2018*; 6:00 p.m., FCSP		at New Mexico State	L 64–66	7–3	Pan American Center; Las Cruces, NM
December 15, 2018*; 3:30 p.m.		at Nebraska	L 71–96	7–4	Pinnacle Bank Arena (3,703); Lincoln, NE
December 19, 2018*; 11:00 a.m.		Samford	L 83–87 ^{OT}	7–5	Hamilton Gymnasium (1,805); Denver, CO
December 21, 2018*; 12:00 p.m.		at Colorado State	L 79–84	7–6	Moby Arena (1,069); Fort Collins, CO
Summit League regular season
December 28, 2018; 4:00 p.m.		at Omaha	W 95–68	8–6 (1–0)	Baxter Arena (295); Omaha, NE
December 30, 2018; 1:00 p.m.		at Western Illinois	L 78–87	8–7 (1–1)	Western Hall (472); Macomb, IL
January 3, 2019; 7:00 p.m.		South Dakota	W 104–99	9–7 (2–1)	Hamilton Gymnasium (382); Denver, CO
January 5, 2019; 7:00 p.m.		North Dakota	W 87–66	10–7 (3–1)	Hamilton Gymnasium (295); Denver, CO
January 9, 2019; 6:00 p.m.		at South Dakota State	L 59–76	10–8 (3–2)	Frost Arena (1,828); Brookings, SD
January 17, 2019; 7:00 p.m.		North Dakota State	W 81–54	11–8 (4–2)	Hamilton Gymnasium (257); Denver, CO
January 20, 2019; 1:00 p.m., Altitude		Oral Roberts	W 93–76	12–8 (5–2)	Magness Arena; Denver, CO
January 26, 2019; 1:00 p.m.		at Purdue Fort Wayne	L 55–70	12–9 (5–3)	Gates Sports Center (1,536); Fort Wayne, IN
January 31, 2019; 7:00 p.m.		South Dakota State	L 67–83	12–10 (5–4)	Hamilton Gymnasium (457); Denver, CO
February 6, 2019; 6:00 p.m.		at Oral Roberts	L 66–74	12–11 (5–5)	Mabee Center (1,029); Tulsa, OK
February 9, 2019; 1:00 p.m.		at North Dakota State	W 87–67	13–11 (6–5)	Scheels Center (742); Fargo, ND
February 13, 2019; 7:00 p.m.		Purdue Fort Wayne	W 82–62	14–12 (7–5)	Hamilton Gymnasium (201); Denver, CO
February 21, 2019; 6:00 p.m.		at No. 23 South Dakota	L 58–73	14–12 (7–6)	Sanford Coyote Sports Center (2,703); Vermillion, SD
February 23, 2019; 10:00 a.m., ESPN3		at North Dakota	W 92–91 ^{OT}	15–12 (8–6)	Betty Engelstad Sioux Center (1,638); Grand Forks, ND
February 28, 2019; 1:00 p.m.		Western Illinois	W 94–85	16–12 (9–6)	Hamilton Gymnasium (294); Denver, CO
March 2, 2019; 7:00 p.m.		Omaha	W 82–76	17–12 (10–6)	Hamilton Gymnasium (407); Denver, CO
Summit League women's tournament
March 10, 2019; 1:30 p.m., MidcoSN/ESPN+	(3)	vs. (6) North Dakota; Quarterfinals	L 67–80	17–13	Denny Sanford Premier Center (2,971); Sioux Falls, SD
WNIT
March 21, 2019*; 7:00 p.m.		at New Mexico; First round	W 83–75	18–13	Dreamstyle Arena (2,875); Albuquerque, NM
March 24, 2019*; 3:00 p.m.		at Idaho; Second round	L 66–88	18–14	Memorial Gym (1,230); Moscow, ID
*Non-conference game. ^{#}Rankings from AP poll. (#) Tournament seedings in parentheses. All times are in Mountain.

== See also ==
- 2018–19 Denver Pioneers men's basketball team
