= 2018–19 Purdue Fort Wayne Mastodons women's basketball team =

American college basketball season

2018–19 Fort Wayne Mastodons women's basketball
- Conference: Summit League
- Record: 7–23 (3–13 Summit)
- Head coach: Niecee Nelson (3rd season)
- Assistant coaches: Marcie Alberts; Haley Seibert; Akilah Sims
- Home arena: Gates Sports Center; Allen County War Memorial Coliseum

2018–19 Summit League women's basketball standings
	Conf.				Overall
Team	W		L	PCT	W		L	PCT
South Dakota State †	15	–	1	.938	28	–	7	.800
South Dakota	14	–	2	.875	28	–	6	.824
Oral Roberts	10	–	6	.625	18	–	13	.581
Denver	10	–	6	.625	18	–	14	.563
Western Illinois	8	–	8	.500	12	–	18	.400
North Dakota	6	–	10	.375	12	–	19	.387
North Dakota State	4	–	12	.250	7	–	22	.241
Purdue Fort Wayne	3	–	13	.188	7	–	22	.241
Omaha	2	–	14	.125	8	–	21	.276
† 2019 Summit League Tournament winner Rankings from AP Poll

The 2018–19 Purdue Fort Wayne Mastodons women's basketball team represented Purdue University Fort Wayne during the 2018–19 NCAA Division I women's basketball season. The Mastodons, led by third year head coach Niecee Nelson, played their home games at the Hilliard Gates Sports Center, with one home game at the Allen County War Memorial Coliseum. They were members of The Summit League. They finished the season 7–23, 3–13 in Summit League play to finish in eighth place. They lost in the quarterfinals of the Summit League women's tournament to South Dakota State.

The season marked the first for the school representing the new Purdue University Fort Wayne. The team previously represented the now defunct Indiana University – Purdue University Fort Wayne. On July 1, 2018, IPFW split into two separate institutions, with IU taking responsibility for IPFW's degree programs in health sciences and Purdue retaining all other academic programs. The Mastodons now represent Purdue University Fort Wayne. With the name change, the school's colors changed from Royal Blue and White to the Old Gold and Black used by the other three Purdue University campuses. On June 18, 2018, the school announced that beginning July 1, 2018 all NCAA sports teams would be known as the Purdue Fort Wayne Mastodons. In addition, a new logo was revealed where the color blue has been incorporated as a secondary color to the university's official school colors of gold and black.

== Roster ==
2018–19 Purdue Fort Wayne Mastodons women's basketball team
Players
Coaches

Pos.	#	Name	Height	Year	Previous school	Hometown
C	00	Jaelencia Williams	6 ft 2 in (1.88 m)	So	Southport	Indianapolis, IN
G	3	Sierra Bell	5 ft 7 in (1.7 m)	Jr	Schlarman Academy; Northeast CC	Danville, IL
F	4	Ellie Dykstra	6 ft 1 in (1.85 m)	Fr	Byron Center	Byron Center, MI
G	5	Hannah Hess	5 ft 10 in (1.78 m)	RS So	Clay	Oregon, OH
G	10	Hannah Albrecht	5 ft 7 in (1.7 m)	Jr	Crown Point; Saint Joseph's (IN)	Oregon, OH
G	12	Anna Lappenküper	5 ft 9 in (1.75 m)	Jr	Otto-Hahn-Gymnasium	Herne, Germany
G	13	De'Jour Young	5 ft 7 in (1.7 m)	Sr	Concordia Lutheran	Fort Wayne, IN
F	14	Sh'Toya Sanders	6 ft 0 in (1.83 m)	RS Jr	Wayne; Chicago State	Fort Wayne, IN
F	15	Camara Douglas	5 ft 11 in (1.8 m)	Fr	Mount Miguel	San Diego, CA
G	23	Amaya Johns	5 ft 9 in (1.75 m)	Fr	Oswego East	Plainfield, IL
F	31	Sofia Rajala	6 ft 0 in (1.83 m)	So	Mäkelänrinne Sports	Helsinki, Finland
G	32	Kierstyn Repp	5 ft 10 in (1.78 m)	So	Archbold	Archbold, OH

Head coach

- Niecee Nelson (Concordia (OR))

Assistant coach(es)

- Marcie Alberts (Ohio State)
- Haley Seibert (Purdue Fort Wayne)
- Akilah Sims (IUPUI)

Legend

- (C) Team captain
- (S) Suspended
- (I) Ineligible
- (W) Walk-on
- Injured
- Current redshirt

Roster

== Schedule ==
Date time, TV	Rank^{#}	Opponent^{#}	Result	Record	Site (attendance) city, state
Non-conference regular season
Nov 6, 2018*; 11:00 am		IU Kokomo	W 87–50	1–0	Gates Sports Center (983); Fort Wayne, IN
Nov 8, 2018*; 7:00 pm, ESPN+		at Western Michigan	L 61–69	1–1	University Arena (560); Kalamazoo, MI
Nov 12, 2018*; 7:00 pm		Taylor	W 84–74	2–1	Gates Sports Center (441); Fort Wayne, IN
Nov 15, 2018*; 1:00 pm, ESPN+		at Eastern Illinois	L 63–72	2–2	Lantz Arena (139); Charleston, IL
Nov 18, 2018*; 2:00 pm		at Purdue	L 44–78	2–3	Mackey Arena (5,970); West Lafayette, IN
Nov 20, 2018*; 7:00 pm, ESPN+		at Evansville	W 72–66	3–3	Meeks Family Fieldhouse (294); Evansville, IN
Nov 24, 2018*; 2:00 pm		SIU Edwardsville	L 49–57	3–4	Gates Sports Center (351); Fort Wayne, IN
Nov 29, 2018*; 12:00 pm, ESPN3		at Loyola–Chicago	L 67–81	3–5	Joseph J. Gentile Arena (1,203); Chicago, IL
Dec 1, 2018*; 3:00 pm, ESPN+		at Milwaukee	L 48–70	3–6	Klotsche Center (481); Milwaukee, WI
Dec 8, 2018*; 2:00 pm		Eastern Michigan	L 72–87	3–7	Gates Sports Center (351); Fort Wayne, IN
Dec 16, 2018*; 2:00 pm		Goshen	W 86–45	4–7	Gates Sports Center (181); Fort Wayne, IN
Dec 16, 2018*; 7:00 pm		Valparaiso	L 64–68	4–8	Gates Sports Center (449); Fort Wayne, IN
Summit League regular season
Dec 28, 2018; 6:00 pm, ESPN+		at North Dakota State	L 54–70	4–9 (0–1)	Scheels Center (280); Fargo, ND
Dec 30, 2018; 2:00 pm, ESPN+		at North Dakota	L 60–79	4–10 (0–2)	Betty Engelstad Sioux Center (1,333); Grand Forks, ND
Jan 3, 2019; 5:00 pm		South Dakota State	L 52–85	4–11 (0–3)	Memorial Coliseum (529); Fort Wayne, IN
Jan 9, 2019; 8:00 pm		Oral Roberts	L 61–72	4–12 (0–4)	Gates Sports Center (302); Fort Wayne, IN
Jan 12, 2019; 1:00 pm		at South Dakota	L 51–69	4–13 (0–5)	Sanford Coyote Sports Center (2,105); Vermillion, SD
Jan 19, 2019; 5:30 pm		at Western Illinois	L 59–73	4–14 (0–6)	Western Hall (521); Macomb, IL
Jan 24, 2019; 5:00 pm		Omaha	W 56–48	5–14 (1–6)	Gates Sports Center (418); Fort Wayne, IN
Jan 24, 2019; 5:00 pm		Denver	W 70–55	6–14 (2–6)	Gates Sports Center (1,536); Fort Wayne, IN
Jan 30, 2019; 8:00 pm		at Oral Roberts	L 56–66	6–15 (2–7)	Mabee Center (1,002); Tulsa, OK
Feb 2, 2019; 12:00 pm		South Dakota	L 49–71	6–16 (2–8)	Gates Sports Center (345); Fort Wayne, IN
Feb 6, 2019; 7:00 pm		Western Illinois	L 61–90	6–17 (2–9)	Gates Sports Center (348); Fort Wayne, IN
Feb 13, 2019; 9:00 pm		at Denver	L 62–82	6–18 (2–10)	Hamilton Gymnasium (201); Denver, CO
Feb 16, 2019; 3:00 pm		at Omaha	L 61–70	6–19 (2–11)	Baxter Arena (437); Omaha, NE
Feb 20, 2019; 8:00 pm, ESPN+		at South Dakota State	L 68–92	6–20 (2–12)	Frost Arena (1,454); Brookings, SD
Feb 28, 2019; 5:00 pm		North Dakota	L 58–74	6–21 (2–13)	Gates Sports Center (324); Fort Wayne, IN
Mar 2, 2019; 2:00 pm		North Dakota State	W 66–46	7–21 (3–13)	Gates Sports Center (482); Fort Wayne, IN
Summit League Women's Tournament
Mar 9, 2019; 1:00 pm, MidcoSN/ESPN+	(8)	vs. (1) South Dakota State; Quarterfinals	L 50–88	7–22	Denny Sanford Premier Center (3,209); Sioux Falls, SD
*Non-conference game. ^{#}Rankings from AP Poll. (#) Tournament seedings in parentheses. All times are in Eastern Time.

== See also ==
- 2018–19 Purdue Fort Wayne Mastodons men's basketball team
