= 2018–19 North Dakota Fighting Hawks women's basketball team =

Intercollegiate basketball season

2018–19 North Dakota Fighting Hawks women's basketball
- Conference: Summit League
- Record: 12–19 (6–10 The Summit)
- Head coach: Travis Brewster (7th season)
- Assistant coaches: Mallory Bernhard; John Motherwell; Emily Evers
- Home arena: Betty Engelstad Sioux Center

2018–19 Summit League women's basketball standings
	Conf.				Overall
Team	W		L	PCT	W		L	PCT
South Dakota State †	15	–	1	.938	28	–	7	.800
South Dakota	14	–	2	.875	28	–	6	.824
Oral Roberts	10	–	6	.625	18	–	13	.581
Denver	10	–	6	.625	18	–	14	.563
Western Illinois	8	–	8	.500	12	–	18	.400
North Dakota	6	–	10	.375	12	–	19	.387
North Dakota State	4	–	12	.250	7	–	22	.241
Purdue Fort Wayne	3	–	13	.188	7	–	22	.241
Omaha	2	–	14	.125	8	–	21	.276
† 2019 Summit League Tournament winner Rankings from AP Poll

The 2018–19 North Dakota Fighting Hawks women's basketball team represented the University of North Dakota during the 2018–19 NCAA Division I women's basketball season. The Fighting Hawks were led by seventh-year head coach Travis Brewster and played their home games at the Betty Engelstad Sioux Center. They were first-year members of the Summit League. They finished the season 12–19, 6–10 in Summit League play to finish in sixth place. They advanced to the semifinals of the Summit League women's tournament, where they lost to South Dakota.

== Roster ==
2018–19 North Dakota Fighting Hawks women's basketball team
Players
Coaches

Pos.	#	Name	Height	Year	Previous school	Hometown
F	1	Jaclyn Jarnot	6 ft 1 in (1.85 m)	Fr	Maranatha Christian Academy	Brooklyn Park, MN
G	3	Melissa Dailey	5 ft 8 in (1.73 m)	Sr	Centennial HS; College of the Siskiyous	Portland, OR
G	4	Jill Morton	5 ft 9 in (1.75 m)	Sr	Edina HS	Edina, MN
C	5	Melissa Leet	6 ft 5 in (1.96 m)	So	Portage HS	Portage, WI
G	10	Claire Orth	5 ft 10 in (1.78 m)	Fr	Centennial HS	Circle Pines, MN
G	12	Alaina Jarnot	5 ft 7 in (1.7 m)	Jr	Maranatha Christian Academy; Monmouth	Brooklyn Park, MN
C	15	Faith Dooley	6 ft 3 in (1.91 m)	Sr	Central Cass HS	Wheatland, ND
G	20	Mikayla Reinke	5 ft 9 in (1.75 m)	So	Kindred HS	Kindred, ND
G	21	Megan Dailey	5 ft 8 in (1.73 m)	Sr	Centennial HS; College of the Siskiyous	Portland, OR
G	22	Bailey Strand	5 ft 10 in (1.78 m)	RS Sr	Kennedy Secondary	Fergus Falls, MN
F	24	Julia Fleecs	6 ft 2 in (1.88 m)	So	Glidden-Ralston Jr.-Sr.	Glidden, IA
G	31	Rachel Garvey	5 ft 7 in (1.7 m)	Fr	Shakopee HS	Shakopee, MN
F	34	Lexi Klabo	6 ft 2 in (1.88 m)	Sr	Davies HS	Fargo, ND
F	35	Tiahna Nicholson	6 ft 2 in (1.88 m)	Fr	Thief River Falls HS	Thief River Falls, MN
G	54	Juliet Gordon	5 ft 11 in (1.8 m)	Fr		Adelaide, Australia

Head coach

- Travis Brewster (Charleston Southern)

Assistant coach(es)

- Mallory Bernhard (North Dakota)
- John Motherwell (Michigan)
- Emily Evers (North Dakota)

Legend

- (C) Team captain
- (S) Suspended
- (I) Ineligible
- (W) Walk-on
- Injured
- Current redshirt

Roster

== Schedule ==
Date time, TV	Rank^{#}	Opponent^{#}	Result	Record	Site (attendance) city, state
Exhibition
Oct 28, 2018*; 2:00 pm		Bemidji State	W 88–39		Betty Engelstad Sioux Center; Grand Forks, ND
Oct 30, 2018*; 7:00 pm		Minnesota–Crookston	W 74–58		Betty Engelstad Sioux Center; Grand Forks, ND
Non-conference regular season
Nov 6, 2018*; 2:00 pm, ACCNE		at No. 18 Syracuse	L 49–85	0–1	Carrier Dome (1,161); Syracuse, NY
Nov 11, 2018*; 1:00 pm, ESPN+		at Valparaiso	W 62–56	1–1	Athletics–Recreation Center (590); Valparaiso, IN
Nov 14, 2018*; 7:00 pm, ESPN+		at Illinois State	L 55–67	1–2	Redbird Arena (507); Normal, IL
Nov 21, 2018*; 1:00 pm		at Penn State	L 68–75	1–3	Bryce Jordan Center (1,881); University Park, PA
Nov 27, 2018*; 6:00 pm		at Rhode Island	L 63–77	1–4	Ryan Center (259); Kingston, RI
Nov 28, 2018*; 3:30 pm, NESN/ELVN		at Massachusetts	W 59–52	2–4	Mullins Center (654); Amherst, MA
Dec 4, 2018*; 7:00 pm, ESPN3		at Northern Iowa	L 60–64	2–5	McLeod Center (1,201); Cedar Falls, IA
Dec 7, 2018*; 11:30 am, FSNOR		Milwaukee	L 46–64	2–6	Betty Engelstad Sioux Center (2,607); Grand Forks, ND
Dec 9, 2018*; 12:00 pm		at Iowa State	L 35–87	2–7	Hilton Coliseum (9,701); Ames, IA
Dec 12, 2018*; 7:00 pm, FSNOR+		Mayville State	W 84–50	3–7	Betty Engelstad Sioux Center (1,315); Grand Forks, ND
Dec 19, 2018*; 12:00 pm, ESPN+		at Stetson; Hatter Classic	L 63–74	3–8	Edmunds Center (304); DeLand, FL
Dec 20, 2018*; 2:00 pm		vs. Western Michigan; Hatter Classic	W 62–50	4–8	Edmunds Center (105); DeLand, FL
Dec 21, 2018*; 12:00 pm		vs. San Francisco; Hatter Classic	W 100–97 ^{2OT}	5–8	Edmunds Center (150); DeLand, FL
Summit League regular season
Dec 30, 2018; 1:00 pm, MidcoSN2/FCS		Purdue Fort Wayne	W 79–60	6–8 (1–0)	Betty Engelstad Sioux Center (1,333); Grand Forks, ND
Jan 2, 2019; 7:00 pm		at Oral Roberts	W 75–67	7–8 (2–0)	Mabee Center (1,005); Tulsa, OK
Jan 5, 2019; 8:00 pm		at Denver	L 66–87	7–9 (2–1)	Hamilton Gymnasium (295); Denver, CO
Jan 9, 2019; 7:00 pm, MidcoSN/FCS		Omaha	W 68–57	8–9 (3–1)	Betty Engelstad Sioux Center (1,354); Grand Forks, ND
Jan 13, 2019; 2:00 pm, MidcoSN/FCS		Western Illinois	L 80–92	8–10 (3–2)	Betty Engelstad Sioux Center (1,400); Grand Forks, ND
Jan 18, 2019; 7:00 pm, MidcoSN2/FCS		South Dakota State	L 48–66	8–11 (3–3)	Betty Engelstad Sioux Center (1,433); Grand Forks, ND
Jan 20, 2019; 1:00 pm, MidcoSN		at North Dakota State	L 57–69	8–12 (3–4)	Scheels Center (1,810); Fargo, ND
Jan 24, 2019; 7:00 pm, MidcoSN2/FCS		South Dakota	L 50–80	8–13 (3–5)	Betty Englstad Sioux Center (1,359); Grand Forks, ND
Feb 1, 2019; 7:00 pm		at Western Illinois	L 90–111	8–14 (3–6)	Western Hall (566); Macomb, IL
Feb 3, 2019; 2:30 pm, MidcoSN		at Omaha	W 69–68	9–14 (4–6)	Baxter Arena (301); Omaha, NE
Feb 7, 2019; 7:00 pm, MidcoSN/FCS		North Dakota State	W 70–58	10–14 (5–6)	Betty Engelstad Sioux Center (1,567); Grand Forks, ND
Feb 9, 2019; 2:00 pm, MidcoSN		at South Dakota State	L 58–81	10–15 (5–7)	Frost Arena (2,734); Brookings, SD
Feb 16, 2019; 2:00 pm, MidcoSN2/FCS		Oral Roberts	L 58–80	10–16 (5–8)	Betty Engelstad Sioux Center (1,551); Grand Forks, ND
Feb 23, 2019; 11:00 am, MidcoSN/FCS		Denver	L 91–92 ^{OT}	10–17 (5–9)	Betty Engelstad Sioux Center (1,638); Grand Forks, ND
Feb 28, 2018; 4:00 pm		at Purdue Fort Wayne	W 74–58	11–17 (6–9)	Gates Sports Center (324); Fort Wayne, IN
Mar 2, 2019; 1:00 pm, MidcoSN		at South Dakota	L 54–87	11–18 (6–10)	Sanford Coyote Sports Center (2,434); Vermillion, SD
Summit League Women's Tournament
Mar 10, 2019; 2:30 pm, MidcoSN/ESPN+	(6)	vs. (3) Denver; Quarterfinals	W 80–67	12–18	Denny Sanford Premier Center (2,971); Sioux Falls, SD
Mar 11, 2019; 2:30 pm, MidcoSN/ESPN+	(6)	vs. (2) South Dakota; Semifinals	L 61–84	12–19	Denny Sanford Premier Center (6,214); Sioux Falls, SD
*Non-conference game. ^{#}Rankings from AP Poll. (#) Tournament seedings in parentheses. All times are in Central Time.

== See also ==
- 2018–19 North Dakota Fighting Hawks men's basketball team
