= 2018–19 South Dakota State Jackrabbits women's basketball team =

Intercollegiate basketball season

2018–19 South Dakota State Jackrabbits women's basketball

Summit League regular season champions Summit League Tournament Champions

NCAA tournament, Sweet Sixteen
- Conference: Summit League

Ranking
- Coaches: No. 22
- Record: 28–7 (15–1 The Summit)
- Head coach: Aaron Johnston (19th season)
- Assistant coaches: Mike Jewett; Carissa Thielbar; Megan Lueck
- Home arena: Frost Arena

2018–19 Summit League women's basketball standings
	Conf.				Overall
Team	W		L	PCT	W		L	PCT
South Dakota State †	15	–	1	.938	28	–	7	.800
South Dakota	14	–	2	.875	28	–	6	.824
Oral Roberts	10	–	6	.625	18	–	13	.581
Denver	10	–	6	.625	18	–	14	.563
Western Illinois	8	–	8	.500	12	–	18	.400
North Dakota	6	–	10	.375	12	–	19	.387
North Dakota State	4	–	12	.250	7	–	22	.241
Purdue Fort Wayne	3	–	13	.188	7	–	22	.241
Omaha	2	–	14	.125	8	–	21	.276
† 2019 Summit League Tournament winner Rankings from AP Poll

The 2018–19 South Dakota State Jackrabbits women's basketball team represented South Dakota State University in the 2018–19 NCAA Division I women's basketball season. The Jackrabbits, led by nineteenth-year head coach Aaron Johnston, competed in the Summit League. They played their home games in Frost Arena in Brookings, South Dakota. They finished the season 28–7, 15–1 in Summit League play to win the Summit League regular season. They were champions of the Summit League women's tournament and earned an automatic trip to the NCAA women's tournament, where they defeated Quinnipiac and upset Syracuse in the first and second rounds to advance to their first sweet sixteen appearance, where they lost to Oregon.

== Previous season ==
The Jackrabbits went 26–7 overall and 12–2 in conference play, finishing in second place. The Jackrabbits won the 2018 Summit League Tournament, defeating North Dakota State in the quarterfinals, Western Illinois in the semifinals, and South Dakota in the Summit League Championship 65–50, earning the Jackrabbits an automatic bid to the 2018 NCAA Division I women's basketball tournament.

During the selection show, the Jackrabbits received an 8 seed in the Spokane region facing the Villanova Wildcats, but lost in overtime 81–74.

== Roster ==
2018–19 South Dakota State Jackrabbits women's basketball team
Players
Coaches

Pos.	#	Name	Height	Year	Previous school	Hometown
G	2	Rylie Cascio Jensen	5 ft 10 in (1.78 m)	Jr	Fremont; Nebraska	Fremont, NE
G	3	Lindsey Theuninck	5 ft 10 in (1.78 m)	RS Fr	Mankato Loyola	Mankato, MN
G	10	Lauren Rongisch	5 ft 7 in (1.7 m)	Fr	Millard West HS	Omaha, NE
G	11	Madison Guebert	5 ft 8 in (1.73 m)	Sr	Eastview	Apple Valley, MN
G	12	Macy Miller (C)	6 ft 0 in (1.83 m)	RS Sr	Mitchell	Mitchell, SD
G	21	Tylee Irwin	6 ft 0 in (1.83 m)	So	Wahpeton	Wahpeton, ND
F	24	Tagyn Larson	6 ft 2 in (1.88 m)	RS Jr	Roosevelt HS; Iowa	Sioux Falls, SD
F	30	Jordan Ferrand	6 ft 2 in (1.88 m)	Fr	White Bear Lake HS	Lino Lakes, MN
G	32	Sydney Palmer	5 ft 11 in (1.8 m)	Sr	T. F. Riggs HS	Pierre, SD
F	33	Paiton Burckhard	6 ft 0 in (1.83 m)	Fr	Central HS	Aberdeen, SD
F	35	Sydney Stapleton	5 ft 10 in (1.78 m)	Fr	Centennial HS	Blaine, MN
G/F	44	Myah Selland	6 ft 2 in (1.88 m)	So	Sanborn Central/Woonsocket HS	Letcher, SD
C	50	Megan Bultsma	6 ft 3 in (1.91 m)	Jr	Mount Vernon/Plankinton HS	Plankinton, SD
F	52	Addison Hirschman	6 ft 2 in (1.88 m)	Fr	Kingsley-Pierson HS	Kingsley, IA

Head coach

- Aaron Johnston (Gustavus Adolphus)

Assistant coach(es)

- Mike Jewett (Augustana (SD))
- Carissa Thielbar (UW–Superior)
- Megan Lueck (Minnesota Duluth)

Legend

- (C) Team captain
- (S) Suspended
- (I) Ineligible
- (W) Walk-on
- Injured
- Current redshirt

Roster

== Schedule ==
Date time, TV	Rank^{#}	Opponent^{#}	Result	Record	Site (attendance) city, state
Exhibition
October 25, 2018*; 7:00 pm		Concorida (Neb.)	W 80–46		Frost Arena (1,213); Brookings, SD
November 1, 2018*; 6:00 pm		Mary	W 77–46		Frost Arena (1,341); Brookings, SD
Non-conference regular season
November 6, 2018*; 11:30 am		at No. 19 Marquette	L 52–91	0–1	Al McGuire Center (2,430); Milwaukee, WI
November 9, 2018*; 7:00 pm, MidcoSN/ESPN3		Florida Gulf Coast	W 80–62	1–1	Frost Arena (1,678); Brookings, SD
November 12, 2018*; 6:00 pm, ESPN+		at Central Michigan	W 80–71	2–1	McGuirk Arena (1,679); Mount Pleasant. MI
November 15, 2018*; 7:00 pm, MidcoSN/ESPN+		Creighton	W 74–48	3–1	Frost Arena (1,713); Brookings, SD
November 23, 2018*; 9:30 pm		vs. No. 4 Baylor; South Point Shootout	L 66–72	3–2	South Point Events Center (586); Las Vegas, NV
November 24, 2018*; 7:00 pm		vs. Buffalo; South Point Shootout	L 55–61	3–3	South Point Events Center (477); Las Vegas, NV
November 29, 2018*; 7:00 pm, MidcoSN/ESPN+		Green Bay	W 77–47	4–3	Frost Arena (1,782); Brookings, SD
December 4, 2018*; 6:00 pm, ESPN+		at Chattanooga	W 71–54	5–3	McKenzie Arena (1,279); Chattanooga, TN
December 8, 2018*; 2:00 pm		No. 21 Drake	W 80–71	6–3	Frost Arena (1,711); Brookings, SD
December 12, 2018*; 7:00 pm, MidcoSN/ESPN+		No. 7 Oregon	L 79–87	6–4	Frost Arena (2,509); Brookings, SD
December 14, 2018*; 7:00 pm		Savannah State	W 97–49	7–4	Frost Arena (922); Brookings, SD
December 18, 2018*; 8:00 pm		at Montana State	W 68–67	8–4	Brick Breeden Fieldhouse (1,327); Bozeman, MT
December 20, 2018*; 7:30 pm		at Wyoming	L 70–77	8–5	Arena-Auditorium (2,837); Laramie, WY
The Summit League regular season
December 28, 2018; 7:00 pm		at Western Illinois	W 93–84	9–5 (1–0)	Western Hall (389); Macomb, IL
January 3, 2019; 4:00 pm		at Purdue Fort Wayne	W 85–52	10–5 (2–0)	Memorial Coliseum (529); Fort Wayne, IN
January 6, 2019; 1:00 pm, MidcoSN/ESPN+		at South Dakota	L 98–105 ^{2OT}	10–6 (2–1)	Sanford Coyote Sports Center (6,004); Vermillion, SD
January 9, 2019; 7:00 pm, MidcoSN/ESPN+		Denver	W 76–59	11–6 (3–1)	Frost Arena (1,828); Brookings, SD
January 12, 2019; 2:00 pm, MidcoSN		Oral Roberts	W 68–55	12–6 (4–1)	Frost Arena (2,829); Brookings, SD
January 18, 2019; 7:00 pm, MidcoSN2/ESPN+		at North Dakota	W 66–48	13–6 (5–1)	Betty Engelstad Sioux Center (1,433); Grand Forks, ND
January 23, 2019; 7:05 pm, MidcoSN2/ESPN+		North Dakota State	W 86–33	14–6 (6–1)	Frost Arena (1,679); Brookings, SD
January 26, 2019; 2:00 pm, MidcoSN2/ESPN3		Omaha	W 81–47	15–6 (7–1)	Frost Arena (3,021); Brookings, SD
January 31, 2019; 8:00 pm		at Denver	W 83–67	16–6 (8–1)	Hamilton Gymnasium (457); Denver, CO
February 2, 2019; 2:00 pm		at Oral Roberts	W 74–65	17–6 (9–1)	Mabee Center (1,140); Tulsa, OK
February 9, 2019; 2:00 pm, MidcoSN/ESPN3		North Dakota	W 81–58	18–6 (10–1)	Frost Arena (2,734); Brookings, SD
February 13, 2019; 7:00 pm, MidcoSN2/ESPN+		at Omaha	W 82–38	19–6 (11–1)	Baxter Arena (625); Omaha, NE
February 16, 2019; 1:00 pm, MidcoSN/ESPN3		at North Dakota State	W 88–48	20–6 (12–1)	Scheels Center (896); Fargo, ND
February 20, 2019; 7:00 pm, MidcoSN2/ESPN+		Purdue Fort Wayne	W 92–68	21–6 (13–1)	Frost Arena (1,454); Brookings, SD
February 24, 2019; 1:00 pm, MidcoSN/ESPN+		No. 23 South Dakota	W 80–77 ^{OT}	22–6 (14–1)	Frost Arena (2,557); Brookings, SD
March 2, 2019; 2:00 pm		Western Illinois	W 100–62	23–6 (15–1)	Frost Arena (3,064); Brookings, SD
The Summit League Women's Tournament
March 9, 2018; 12:00 pm, MidcoSN/ESPN+	(1)	vs. (8) Purdue Fort Wayne; Quarterfinals	W 88–50	24–6	Denny Sanford Premier Center; Sioux Falls, SD
March 11, 2018; 12:00 pm, MidcoSN/ESPN+	(1)	vs. (4) Oral Roberts; Semifinals	W 86–55	25–6	Denny Sanford Premier Center; Sioux Falls, SD
March 11, 2018; 1:00 pm, ESPNU	(1)	vs. (2) South Dakota; Championship Game	W 83–71	26–6	Denny Sanford Premier Center; Sioux Falls, SD
NCAA Women's Tournament
March 23, 2019*; 10:00 am, ESPN2	(6 P)	vs. (11 P) Quinnipiac; First Round	W 76–65	27–6	Carrier Dome; Syracuse, NY
March 25, 2019*; 6:00 pm, ESPN	(6 P)	at (3 P) No. 12 Syracuse; Second Round	W 75–64	28–6	Carrier Dome (2,474); Syracuse, NY
March 29, 2019*; 10:30 pm, ESPN2	(6 P)	vs. (2 P) No. 7 Oregon; Sweet Sixteen	L 53–63	28–7	Moda Center (11,324); Portland, OR
*Non-conference game. ^{#}Rankings from AP Poll. (#) Tournament seedings in parentheses. P=Portland Region. All times are in Central Time.

== Rankings ==
Regular season polls
Poll	Pre- season	Week 2	Week 3	Week 4	Week 5	Week 6	Week 7	Week 8	Week 9	Week 10	Week 11	Week 12	Week 13	Week 14	Week 15	Week 16	Week 17	Week 18	Week 19	Final
AP	NR	NR	RV	NR	NR	RV	RV	NR	RV	NR	NR	NR	NR	NR	RV	RV	RV	RV	RV	N/A
Coaches	NR	NR	RV	NR	NR	RV	RV	NR	NR	NR	NR	NR	NR	NR	NR	NR	RV	RV	RV	22

Legend
	Increase in ranking
	Decrease in ranking
	Not ranked previous week
(RV)	Received votes
(NR)	Not ranked
