= 2018–19 South Dakota Coyotes women's basketball team =

Intercollegiate basketball season

2018–19 South Dakota Coyotes women's basketball

NCAA tournament, first round
- Conference: Summit League
- Record: 28–6 (14–2 The Summit)
- Head coach: Dawn Plitzuweit (3rd season)
- Assistant coaches: Jason Jeschke; Aaron Horn; Jena Freudenberg
- Home arena: Sanford Coyote Sports Center

2018–19 Summit League women's basketball standings
	Conf.				Overall
Team	W		L	PCT	W		L	PCT
South Dakota State †	15	–	1	.938	28	–	7	.800
South Dakota	14	–	2	.875	28	–	6	.824
Oral Roberts	10	–	6	.625	18	–	13	.581
Denver	10	–	6	.625	18	–	14	.563
Western Illinois	8	–	8	.500	12	–	18	.400
North Dakota	6	–	10	.375	12	–	19	.387
North Dakota State	4	–	12	.250	7	–	22	.241
Purdue Fort Wayne	3	–	13	.188	7	–	22	.241
Omaha	2	–	14	.125	8	–	21	.276
† 2019 Summit League Tournament winner Rankings from AP Poll

The 2018–19 South Dakota Coyotes women's basketball team represented University of South Dakota in the 2018–19 NCAA Division I women's basketball season. The Coyotes, led by third-year head coach Dawn Plitzuweit, competed in the Summit League. They played home games in Sanford Coyote Sports Center in Vermillion, South Dakota.

The Coyotes went 28–6 overall and 14–2 in Summit League play. At one point during the season, South Dakota were ranked for the first time in school history. In the Summit League tournament the Coyotes reached the championship game for the sixth time in the past seven years, and again faced South Dakota State for the fifth time in those six years. The Coyotes reached the NCAA tournament, after the Summit League tournament loss to South Dakota State with an at-large bid to the Portland Regional as a number 8 seed. They faced off against Clemson, but lost.

== Previous season ==
In the 2017–18 season, the Coyotes went 29–7 overall and 14–0 in conference play, finishing first in the Summit League. They lost in the championship game of the 2018 Summit League tournament to South Dakota State.

With the loss to South Dakota State in the conference tournament, the Coyotes automatically qualified to the 2018 WNIT. They won their first three games against Houston, Colorado State and Michigan State, but lost to TCU in the quarterfinals.

== Roster ==
2018–19 South Dakota Coyotes women's basketball team
Players
Coaches

Pos.	#	Name	Height	Year	Previous school	Hometown
G	1	Claudia Kunzer	5 ft 7 in (1.7 m)	So	Montini Catholic HS	Bartlett, IL
G	2	Liv Korngable	5 ft 8 in (1.73 m)	So	Mayo HS	Rochester, MN
G	4	Courtney Schoenbeck	5 ft 8 in (1.73 m)	Fr	Big Foot HS	Walworth, WI
G	10	Allison Arens	5 ft 10 in (1.78 m)	Sr	Crofton HS	Crofton, NE
G	11	Monica Arens	5 ft 10 in (1.78 m)	So	Crofton HS	Crofton, NE
F	14	Regan Sankey	6 ft 1 in (1.85 m)	Fr	Lincoln East HS	Lincoln, NE
F	15	Taylor Fredrick	6 ft 0 in (1.83 m)	Jr	Harlan Community HS	Earling, IA
F	20	Megan Bonar	6 ft 1 in (1.85 m)	Jr	De Soto	Gardner, KS
G	21	Taylor Terronez	5 ft 10 in (1.78 m)	Fr	Watertown HS	Watertown, SD
G	22	Chloe Lamb	5 ft 9 in (1.75 m)	So	Sully Buttes HS	Onida, SD
G	23	Madison McKeever	5 ft 7 in (1.7 m)	Jr	Win-E-Mac Secondary School	Erskine, MN
G	24	Ciara Duffy	6 ft 1 in (1.85 m)	Jr	St. Thomas More HS	Rapid City, SD
C	34	Hannah Sjerven	6 ft 2 in (1.88 m)	RS So	Rogers HS; New Mexico	Rogers, MN
F	35	Allison Peplowski	6 ft 1 in (1.85 m)	Fr	Williamston HS	Williamston, MI

Head coach

- Dawn Plitzuweit (Michigan Tech)

Assistant coach(es)

- Jason Jeschke (Southwestern (KS))
- Aaron Horn (Toledo)
- Jenna Freudenberg (Concordia-Moorhead)

Legend

- (C) Team captain
- (S) Suspended
- (I) Ineligible
- (W) Walk-on
- Injured
- Current redshirt

Roster
Last update: April 5, 2025

== Schedule ==
Date time, TV	Rank^{#}	Opponent^{#}	Result	Record	Site (attendance) city, state
Non-conference regular season
November 7, 2018*; 6:00 p.m.		at Creighton	W 77–65	1–0	D. J. Sokol Arena (1,006); Omaha, NE
November 11, 2018*; 3:15 p.m., MidcoSN2/ESPN+		Incarnate Word	W 96–43	2–0	Sanford Coyote Sports Center (1,799); Vermillion, SD
November 15, 2018*; 6:00 p.m., MC22/ESPN3		at Drake	L 64–76	2–1	Knapp Center (5,511); Des Moines, IA
November 18, 2018*; 1:00 p.m.		College of Saint Mary	W 112–52	3–1	Sanford Coyote Sports Center (1,584); Vermillion, SD
November 21, 2018*; 7:00 p.m., MidcoSN/ESPN+		vs. Wichita State	W 73–64	4–1	Sanford Pentagon (1,892); Sioux Falls, SD
November 24, 2018*; 8:00 p.m.		at Montana	W 64–41	5–1	Dahlberg Arena (2,682); Missoula, MT
November 28, 2018*; 7:00 p.m., MidcoSN/MC22/ESPN+		No. 23 Iowa State	W 64–59	6–1	Sanford Coyote Sports Center (2,364); Vermillion, SD
December 1, 2018*; 1:00 p.m., MidcoSN/ESPN3		Green Bay	W 55–49	7–1	Sanford Coyote Sports Center (1,960); Vermillion, SD
December 4, 2018*; 7:00 p.m., ESPN+		at Missouri State	W 85–74	8–1	JQH Arena (1,820); Springfield, MO
December 9, 2018*; 1:00 p.m.		Bellevue	W 79–40	9–1	Sanford Coyote Sports Center (1,718); Vermillion, SD
December 15, 2018*; 3:00 p.m.		at No. 22 Missouri	W 74–61	10–1	Mizzou Arena (4,509); Columbia, MO
December 19, 2018*; 12:30 p.m.		vs. Grambling State; Puerto Rico Classic	W 67–53	11–1	Mario Morales Coliseum (150); Guaynabo, Puerto Rico
December 20, 2018*; 3:00 p.m.		vs. Loyola Marymount; Puerto Rico Classic	W 67–40	12–1	Mario Morales Coliseum (150); Guaynabo, Puerto Rico
December 21, 2018*; 3:00 p.m.		vs. Indiana; Puerto Rico Classic	L 60–68	12–2	Mario Morales Coliseum (150); Guaynabo, Puerto Rico
Summit League regular season
December 30, 2018; 1:00 p.m., MidcoSN/ESPN+		at North Dakota State	W 67–41	13–2 (1–0)	Scheels Center (520); Fargo, ND
January 3, 2019; 8:00 p.m.		at Denver	L 99–104	13–3 (1–1)	Hamilton Gymnasium (382); Denver, CO
January 6, 2019; 1:00 p.m., MidcoSN/ESPN+		South Dakota State	W 105–98 ^{2OT}	14–3 (2–1)	Sanford Coyote Sports Center (6,004); Vermillion, SD
January 12, 2019; 12:00 p.m.		Purdue Fort Wayne	W 69–51	15–3 (3–1)	Sanford Coyote Sports Center (2,105); Vermillion, SD
January 18, 2019; 7:00 p.m.		at Oral Roberts	W 76–72	16–3 (4–1)	Mabee Center (1,063); Tulsa, OK
January 20, 2019; 2:00 p.m., MidcoSN2/ESPN+		at Omaha	W 80–49	17–3 (5–1)	Baxter Arena (632); Omaha, NE
January 24, 2019; 7:00 p.m., MidcoSN2/ESPN+		at North Dakota	W 80–50	18–3 (6–1)	Betty Engelstad Sioux Center (1,359); Grand Forks, ND
January 26, 2019; 1:00 p.m., MidcoSN/ESPN3		Western Illinois	W 92–49	19–3 (7–1)	Sanford Coyote Sports Center (2,568); Vermillion, SD
February 2, 2019; 11:00 a.m.		at Purdue Fort Wayne	W 71–49	20–3 (8–1)	Hilliard Gates Sports Center (345); Fort Wayne, IN
February 6, 2019; 7:00 p.m., MidcoSN2/ESPN+		Omaha	W 78–33	21–3 (9–1)	Sanford Coyote Sports Center (1,882); Vermillion, SD
February 9, 2019; 1:00 p.m.		Oral Roberts; Pink Day	W 75–64	22–3 (10–1)	Sanford Coyote Sports Center (2,242); Vermillion, SD
February 16, 2019; 4:30 p.m., ESPN3	No. 25	at Western Illinois	W 83–61	23–3 (11–1)	Western Hall (573); Macomb, IL
February 21, 2019; 7:00 p.m., MidcoSN/ESPN+	No. 23	Denver	W 73–58	24–3 (12–1)	Sanford Coyote Sports Center (2,703); Vermillion, SD
February 24, 2019; 1:00 p.m., MidcoSN/ESPN+	No. 23	at South Dakota State	L 77–80 ^{OT}	24–4 (12–2)	Frost Arena (2,557); Brookings, SD
February 28, 2019; 5:30 p.m., MidcoSN/ESPN+		North Dakota State	W 76–57	25–4 (13–2)	Sanford Coyote Sports Center (2,383); Vermillion, SD
March 2, 2019; 1:00 p.m., MidcoSN/ESPN3		North Dakota	W 87–54	26–4 (14–2)	Sanford Coyote Sports Center (2,434); Vermillion, SD
The Summit League women's tournament
March 9, 2018; 2:30 p.m., MidcoSN/ESPN+	(2)	vs. (7) North Dakota State; Quarterfinals	W 74–51	27–4	Denny Sanford Premier Center (7,137); Sioux Falls, SD
March 11, 2018; 2:30 p.m., MidcoSN/ESPN+	(2)	vs. (6) North Dakota; Semifinals	W 84–61	28–4	Denny Sanford Premier Center (6,214); Sioux Falls, SD
March 12, 2018; 1:00 p.m., ESPNU	(2)	vs. (1) South Dakota State; Championship game	L 71–83	28–5	Denny Sanford Premier Center (7,871); Sioux Falls, SD
NCAA women's tournament
March 22, 2019*; 6:00 p.m., ESPN2	(8 P)	vs. (9 P) Clemson; First round	L 66–79	28–6	Humphrey Coliseum (9,967); Starkville, MS
*Non-conference game. ^{#}Rankings from AP poll. (#) Tournament seedings in parentheses. P=Portland Region. All times are in Central.

== Rankings ==
Regular-season polls
Poll	Pre- season	Week 2	Week 3	Week 4	Week 5	Week 6	Week 7	Week 8	Week 9	Week 10	Week 11	Week 12	Week 13	Week 14	Week 15	Week 16	Week 17	Week 18	Week 19	Final
AP	NR	NR	NR	NR	RV	RV	RV	RV	RV	RV	RV	RV	RV	RV	25	23	RV	RV	RV	N/A
Coaches	NR	NR	NR	NR	RV	RV	RV	RV	RV	RV	RV	RV	RV	RV	25	23	25	25	25	NR

Legend
	Increase in ranking
	Decrease in ranking
	Not ranked previous week
(RV)	Received votes
(NR)	Not ranked
