= 2018–19 Western Illinois Leathernecks women's basketball team =

Intercollegiate basketball season

2018–19 Western Illinois Leathernecks women's basketball
- Conference: Summit League
- Record: 12–18 (8–8 The Summit)
- Head coach: JD Gravina (8th season)
- Assistant coaches: Seth Minter; Sydney Crafton; Emily Clemens
- Home arena: Western Hall

2018–19 Summit League women's basketball standings
	Conf.				Overall
Team	W		L	PCT	W		L	PCT
South Dakota State †	15	–	1	.938	28	–	7	.800
South Dakota	14	–	2	.875	28	–	6	.824
Oral Roberts	10	–	6	.625	18	–	13	.581
Denver	10	–	6	.625	18	–	14	.563
Western Illinois	8	–	8	.500	12	–	18	.400
North Dakota	6	–	10	.375	12	–	19	.387
North Dakota State	4	–	12	.250	7	–	22	.241
Purdue Fort Wayne	3	–	13	.188	7	–	22	.241
Omaha	2	–	14	.125	8	–	21	.276
† 2019 Summit League Tournament winner Rankings from AP Poll

The 2018–19 Western Illinois Leathernecks women's basketball team represented Western Illinois University in the 2018–19 NCAA Division I women's basketball season. The Leathernecks, led by eighth-year head coach JD Gravina, played their home games at the Western Hall and were members of The Summit League. They finished the season 12–18, 8–8 in Summit League play to finish in fifth place. They lost in the quarterfinals of the Summit League women's tournament to Oral Roberts.

== Roster ==
2018–19 Western Illinois Leathernecks women's basketball team
Players
Coaches

Pos.	#	Name	Height	Year	Previous school	Hometown
G	1	Annabel Graettinger	5 ft 10 in (1.78 m)	RS Jr	Muscatine; South Dakota State	Muscatine, IA
G	4	Danni Nichols	5 ft 10 in (1.78 m)	Fr	David H. Hickman	Columbia, MO
G	10	Payton Courier	5 ft 10 in (1.78 m)	Fr	Big Foot	Walworth, WI
G	13	Olivia Kaufmann	5 ft 8 in (1.73 m)	Jr	Jacksonville	Jacksonville, IL
G	14	Elizabeth Lutz	5 ft 7 in (1.7 m)	Fr	California	California, MO
G	15	Carla Flores Garcia	5 ft 9 in (1.75 m)	Fr	Mare de deu de la Salut	Barcelona, Spain
G	21	Grace Gilmore	5 ft 10 in (1.78 m)	So	Arrowhead	Hartland, WI
G	22	Mackenzie Rogers	5 ft 8 in (1.73 m)	Fr	Mediapolis	Mediapolis, IA
G	24	Taylor Higginbotham	5 ft 10 in (1.78 m)	Sr	Germantown	Germantown, WI
G	30	Avery Hamm	5 ft 9 in (1.75 m)	Jr	University; Parkland College	Bloomington, IL
F	32	Kyra Washington	6 ft 0 in (1.83 m)	Jr	St. Charles East; Parkland College	West Chicago, IL
F	33	Jinda Guidinger	5 ft 11 in (1.8 m)	Fr	Pewaukee	Pewaukee, WI
G	34	Sam Pryor	6 ft 0 in (1.83 m)	Jr	Burlington Central	Elgin, IL

Head coach

- JD Gravina (William Jewell)

Assistant coach(es)

- Seth Minter (Culver–Stockton)
- Sydney Crafton (Missouri)
- Emily Clemens (Western Illinois)

Legend

- (C) Team captain
- (S) Suspended
- (I) Ineligible
- (W) Walk-on
- Injured
- Current redshirt

Roster

== Schedule ==
Date time, TV	Rank^{#}	Opponent^{#}	Result	Record	Site (attendance) city, state
Exhibition
Oct 28, 2018*; 4:30 pm		Truman State	W 92–86		Western Hall (254); Macomb, IL
Nov 1, 2018*; 5:30 pm		William Jewell	W 89–77		Western Hall (301); Macomb, IL
Non-conference regular season
Nov 6, 2018*; 8:30 pm		No. 16 Missouri	L 64–89	0–1	Western Hall (1,227); Macomb, IL
Nov 10, 2018*; 4:30 pm		Drake	L 71–98	0–2	Western Hall (681); Macomb, IL
Nov 12, 2018*; 7:00 pm		MacMurray College	W 136–39	1–2	Western Hall (429); Macomb, IL
Nov 15, 2018*; 6:00 pm, BTN		at Purdue	L 60–81	1–3	Mackey Arena (5,816); West Lafayette, IN
Nov 17, 2018*; 1:00 pm		at Butler	L 51–92	1–4	Hinkle Fieldhouse (479); Indianapolis, IN
Nov 20, 2018*; 6:30 pm		at Southeast Missouri State	L 71–81	1–5	Show Me Center (362); Cape Girardeau, MO
Nov 27, 2018*; 5:30 pm		William Woods	W 81–73	2–5	Western Hall (875); Macomb, IL
Dec 2, 2018*; 4:30 pm		Austin Peay	W 77–72	3–5	Western Hall (436); Macomb, IL
Dec 4, 2018*; 11:00 am, ESPN+		at Bradley	L 68–82	3–6	Renaissance Coliseum (2,324); Peoria, IL
Dec 7, 2018*; 4:30 pm		vs. Eastern Illinois; Compass Challenge	L 62–64	3–7	SIU Arena (100); Carbondale, IL
Dec 8, 2018*; 1:00 pm		vs. Northern Illinois; Compass Challenge	L 61–86	3–8	SIU Arena (100); Carbondale, IL
Dec 20, 2018*; 4:30 pm		vs. UTEP; Las Vegas Holiday Hoops Classic	L 72–84	3–9	South Point Arena; Enterprise, NV
Dec 21, 2018*; 4:30 pm		vs. Furman; Las Vegas Holiday Hoops Classic	W 78–65	4–9	South Point Arena; Enterprise, NV
Summit League regular season
Dec 28, 2018; 7:00 pm		South Dakota State	L 84–93	4–10 (0–1)	Western Hall (389); Macomb, IL
Dec 30, 2018; 2:00 pm		Denver	W 87–78	5–10 (1–1)	Western Hall (472); Macomb, IL
Jan 5, 2019; 2:00 pm		at Oral Roberts	L 64–68	5–11 (1–2)	Mabee Center (1,083); Tulsa, OK
Jan 11, 2019; 7:00 pm, ESPN+		at North Dakota State	L 60–68	5–12 (1–3)	Scheels Center (378); Fargo, ND
Jan 13, 2019; 2:00 pm		at North Dakota	W 92–80	6–12 (2–3)	Betty Engelstad Sioux Center (1,400); Grand Forks, ND
Jan 16, 2019; 7:00 pm		Omaha	W 78–70	7–12 (3–3)	Western Hall (712); Macomb, IL
Jan 19, 2019; 4:30 pm		Purdue Fort Wayne	W 73–59	8–12 (4–3)	Western Hall (521); Macomb, IL
Jan 26, 2019; 1:00 pm, ESPN3		at South Dakota	L 49–92	8–13 (4–4)	Sanford Coyote Sports Center (2,568); Vermillion, SD
Feb 1, 2019; 7:00 pm		North Dakota	W 111–90	9–13 (5–4)	Western Hall (566); Macomb, IL
Feb 3, 2019; 1:00 pm, ESPN+		North Dakota State	W 82–70	10–13 (6–4)	Western Hall (417); Macomb, IL
Feb 6, 2019; 6:00 pm		at Purdue Fort Wayne	W 90–61	11–13 (7–4)	Gates Sports Center (348); Fort Wayne, IN
Feb 9, 2019; 2:00 pm		at Omaha	W 79–67	12–13 (8–4)	Baxter Arena (438); Omaha, NE
Feb 16, 2019; 4:30 pm, ESPN3		No. 25 South Dakota	L 61–83	12–14 (8–5)	Western Hall (573); Macomb, IL
Feb 23, 2019; 4:30 pm, ESPN3		Oral Roberts	W 87–78	12–15 (8–6)	Western Hall (792); Macomb, IL
Feb 28, 2019; 2:00 pm		at Denver	L 85–94	12–16 (8–7)	Hamilton Gymnasium (294); Denver, CO
Mar 2, 2019; 2:00 pm		at South Dakota State	L 62–100	12–17 (8–8)	Frost Arena (3,064); Brookings, SD
Summit League Women's Tournament
Mar 10, 2019; 12:00 pm, MidcoSN/ESPN3	(5)	vs. (4) Oral Roberts; Quarterfinals	L 67–80	12–18	Denny Sanford Premier Center; Sioux Falls, SD
*Non-conference game. ^{#}Rankings from AP Poll. (#) Tournament seedings in parentheses. All times are in Central Time.

== See also ==
2018–19 Western Illinois Leathernecks men's basketball team
