= 2018–19 Omaha Mavericks women's basketball team =

Intercollegiate basketball season

2018–19 Omaha Mavericks women's basketball
- Conference: Summit League
- Record: 8–21 (2–14 Summit)
- Head coach: Brittany Lange (6th season)
- Assistant coaches: Rodney Rogan; Josh Keister; Janet Butler
- Home arena: Baxter Arena

2018–19 Summit League women's basketball standings
| | Conf. | | | | Overall |
| Team | W | | L | PCT | W | | L | PCT |
|---|---|---|---|---|---|---|---|---|
| South Dakota State † | 15 | – | 1 | .938 | 28 | – | 7 | .800 |
| South Dakota | 14 | – | 2 | .875 | 28 | – | 6 | .824 |
| Oral Roberts | 10 | – | 6 | .625 | 18 | – | 13 | .581 |
| Denver | 10 | – | 6 | .625 | 18 | – | 14 | .563 |
| Western Illinois | 8 | – | 8 | .500 | 12 | – | 18 | .400 |
| North Dakota | 6 | – | 10 | .375 | 12 | – | 19 | .387 |
| North Dakota State | 4 | – | 12 | .250 | 7 | – | 22 | .241 |
| Purdue Fort Wayne | 3 | – | 13 | .188 | 7 | – | 22 | .241 |
| Omaha | 2 | – | 14 | .125 | 8 | – | 21 | .276 |
† 2019 Summit League Tournament winner Rankings from AP Poll

The 2018–19 Omaha Mavericks women's basketball team represented the University of Nebraska Omaha during the 2018–19 NCAA Division I women's basketball season. The Mavericks, led by third year head coach Brittany Lange, played their home games at Baxter Arena and were members of The Summit League. They finished the season 8–21, 2–14 in Summit League play to finish in last place. They failed to qualify for the Summit League women's tournament.

== Roster ==
2018–19 Omaha Mavericks women's basketball team
Players
Coaches

| Pos. | # | Name | Height | Year | Previous school | Hometown |
|---|---|---|---|---|---|---|
| G | 0 | Juliana Chagas | 5 ft 6 in (1.68 m) | So | Colégio Singular; Barton CC | Santo André, Brazil |
| G | 1 | Kalen Phillips | 5 ft 9 in (1.75 m) | Sr | South Jones | Ellisville, MS |
| G | 2 | Rayanna Carter | 5 ft 7 in (1.7 m) | Jr | Leander; Texas A&M–Corpus Christi/Blinn College | Cedar Park, TX |
| C | 3 | Elena Pilakouta | 6 ft 3 in (1.91 m) | Fr | Kykkos B | Nicosia, Cyprus |
| G | 11 | Claire Killian | 5 ft 10 in (1.78 m) | So | Watertown-Mayer | Watertown, MN |
| G | 13 | Kylee Coulter | 5 ft 9 in (1.75 m) | RS Fr | Fayetteville | Fayetteville, AR |
| G | 20 | Emily Petersen | 5 ft 10 in (1.78 m) | So | Bellevue West | Omaha, NE |
| G | 21 | Alicia Mountain | 5 ft 8 in (1.73 m) | Sr | Elkhorn; Iowa Western CC | Elkhorn, NE |
| F | 25 | Josie Filer | 6 ft 0 in (1.83 m) | Fr | Dowling Catholic | Des Moines, IA |
| F | 33 | Romekia Wallace | 6 ft 0 in (1.83 m) | Sr | Cardinal Ritter; Moberly Area CC | St. Louis, MO |
| C | 35 | Mariah Murdie | 6 ft 3 in (1.91 m) | Fr | Jefferson West | Meriden, KS |
| F | 40 | Jay Bridgemen | 6 ft 1 in (1.85 m) | Jr | Westside | Omaha, NE |
| G | 42 | Sophie Johnston | 5 ft 10 in (1.78 m) | Fr | Hillcrest Christian College | Gold Coast, Australia |

Head coach

- Brittany Lange (Iowa State)

Assistant coach(es)

- Rodney Rogan (Millsaps)
- Josh Keister (Mount Mercy)
- Janet Butler (Louisiana Christian)

Legend

- (C) Team captain
- (S) Suspended
- (I) Ineligible
- (W) Walk-on
- Injured
- Current redshirt

Roster

== Schedule ==
| Date time, TV | Rank^{#} | Opponent^{#} | Result | Record | Site (attendance) city, state |
Exhibition
| Nov 4, 2018*; 7:00 pm | | Avila | W 74–44 | | Baxter Arena; Omaha, NE |
Regular season
| Nov 9, 2018*; 7:00 pm | | USC Upstate | W 96–69 | 1–0 | Baxter Arena (365); Omaha, NE |
| Nov 12, 2018*; 5:30 pm | | at Kansas State | L 46–61 | 1–1 | Bramlage Coliseum (3,498); Manhattan, KS |
| Nov 12, 2018*; 5:30 pm | | Cal State Northridge | L 52–64 | 1–2 | Baxter Arena (449); Omaha, NE |
| Nov 23, 2018*; 1:00 pm | | vs. Campbell; FIU Thanksgiving Tournament semifinals | L 52–65 | 1–3 | Ocean Bank Convocation Center; Miami, FL |
| Nov 25, 2018*; 11:00 am | | vs. Florida A&M; FIU Thanksgiving Tournament 3rd place game | W 57–50 | 2–3 | Ocean Bank Convocation Center; Miami, FL |
| Nov 29, 2018*; 10:00 am | | at Detroit Mercy | W 51–42 | 3–3 | Calihan Hall (3,106); Detroit, MI |
| Dec 2, 2018*; 2:00 pm | | Graceland | W 81–39 | 4–3 | Baxter Arena (248); Omaha, NE |
| Dec 5, 2018*; 7:00 pm, FSGO | | at Creighton | L 51–66 | 4–4 | D. J. Sokol Arena (863); Omaha, NE |
| Dec 9, 2018*; 2:00 pm | | Cal State Bakersfield | W 53–46 | 5–4 | Baxter Arena (387); Omaha, NE |
| Dec 14, 2018*; 12:00 pm | | Bradley | L 60–80 | 5–5 | Sapp Fieldhouse (1,503); Omaha, NE |
| Dec 16, 2018*; 3:00 pm | | at Montana State | L 56–59 | 5–6 | Brick Breeden Fieldhouse (1,489); Bozeman, MT |
| Dec 21, 2018*; 6:00 pm, ESPN3 | | at Northern Iowa | L 50–79 | 5–7 | McLeod Center (1,129); Cedar Falls, IA |
| Dec 28, 2018; 5:00 pm | | Denver | L 68–95 | 5–8 (0–1) | Baxter Arena (295); Omaha, NE |
| Dec 30, 2018; 2:00 pm | | Oral Roberts | L 56–71 | 5–9 (0–2) | Baxter Arena (278); Omaha, NE |
| Jan 6, 2019; 2:00 pm, YurView | | North Dakota State | W 78–61 | 6–9 (1–2) | Baxter Arena (351); Omaha, NE |
| Jan 9, 2019; 7:00 pm, YurView | | at North Dakota | L 57–68 | 6–10 (1–3) | Betty Engelstad Sioux Center (1,354); Grand Forks, ND |
| Jan 16, 2019; 7:00 pm | | at Western Illinois | L 70–78 | 6–11 (1–4) | Western Hall (712); Macomb, IL |
| Jan 20, 2019; 2:00 pm, YurView | | South Dakota | L 49–80 | 6–12 (1–5) | Baxter Arena (632); Omaha, NE |
| Jan 24, 2019; 4:00 pm | | at Purdue Fort Wayne | L 48–56 | 6–13 (1–6) | Gates Sports Center (418); Fort Wayne, IN |
| Jan 26, 2019; 2:00 pm, YurView | | at South Dakota State | L 47–81 | 6–14 (1–7) | Frost Arena (3,021); Brookings, SD |
| Jan 30, 2019*; 7:00 pm | | Peru State | W 91–44 | 7–14 | Baxter Arena (377); Omaha, NE |
| Feb 3, 2019; 2:30 pm, YurView | | North Dakota | L 68–69 | 7–15 (1–8) | Baxter Arena (301); Omaha, NE |
| Feb 6, 2019; 7:00 pm, YurView | | at South Dakota | L 33–78 | 7–16 (1–9) | Sanford Coyote Sports Center (1,882); Vermillion, SD |
| Feb 9, 2019; 2:00 pm | | Western Illinois | L 67–79 | 7–17 (1–10) | Baxter Arena (438); Omaha, NE |
| Feb 13, 2019; 7:00 pm, YurView | | South Dakota State | L 38–82 | 7–18 (1–11) | Baxter Arena (625); Omaha, NE |
| Feb 16, 2019; 2:00 pm | | Purdue Fort Wayne | W 70–61 | 8–18 (2–11) | Baxter Arena (437); Omaha, NE |
| Feb 23, 2019; 1:00 pm, YurView | | at North Dakota State | L 48–55 | 8–19 (2–12) | Scheels Center (356); Fargo, ND |
| Feb 28, 2019; 5:00 pm | | at Oral Roberts | L 64–65 | 8–20 (2–13) | Mabee Center (1,206); Tulsa, OK |
| Mar 2, 2019; 8:00 pm | | at Denver | L 76–82 | 8–21 (2–14) | Hamilton Gymnasium (408); Denver, CO |
*Non-conference game. ^{#}Rankings from AP Poll. (#) Tournament seedings in parentheses. All times are in Central Time.

== See also ==
- 2018–19 Omaha Mavericks men's basketball team
