= 2018–19 Oral Roberts Golden Eagles women's basketball team =

Intercollegiate basketball season

2018–19 Oral Roberts Golden Eagles women's basketball
- Conference: Summit League
- Record: 18–13 (10–6 Summit)
- Head coach: Misti Cussen (7th season)
- Assistant coaches: Kyron Stokes; Lee Mayberry; Jaci Inman
- Home arena: Mabee Center

2018–19 Summit League women's basketball standings
	Conf.				Overall
Team	W		L	PCT	W		L	PCT
South Dakota State †	15	–	1	.938	28	–	7	.800
South Dakota	14	–	2	.875	28	–	6	.824
Oral Roberts	10	–	6	.625	18	–	13	.581
Denver	10	–	6	.625	18	–	14	.563
Western Illinois	8	–	8	.500	12	–	18	.400
North Dakota	6	–	10	.375	12	–	19	.387
North Dakota State	4	–	12	.250	7	–	22	.241
Purdue Fort Wayne	3	–	13	.188	7	–	22	.241
Omaha	2	–	14	.125	8	–	21	.276
† 2019 Summit League Tournament winner Rankings from AP Poll

The 2018–19 Oral Roberts Golden Eagles women's basketball team represented Oral Roberts University during the 2018–19 NCAA Division I women's basketball season. The Golden Eagles were led by seventh-year head coach Misti Cussen and played their home games at the Mabee Center. They were members of the Summit League. They finished the season 18–13, 10–6 in Summit League play, to finish in a tie for third place. They advanced to the semifinals of the Summit League women's tournament where they lost to South Dakota State.

== Roster ==
2018–19 Oral Roberts Golden Eagles women's basketball team
Players
Coaches

Pos.	#	Name	Height	Year	Previous school	Hometown
G	1	Jasmyne May	5 ft 7 in (1.7 m)	So	Fayetteville Christian School; Palm Beach State College	Fayetteville, NC
G	3	Katie Kirkhart	5 ft 9 in (1.75 m)	So	Hilldale	Muskogee, OK
G	10	Maya Mayberry	5 ft 8 in (1.73 m)	So	Fayetteville	Fayetteville, AR
F	12	Sabela Reigosa	6 ft 2 in (1.88 m)	Jr	IES Can Puig; Northern Oklahoma College	Barcelona, Spain
G	13	Rachel Skalnik	5 ft 8 in (1.73 m)	Jr	Owasso High School	Owasso, OK
G	15	Erika Ankney	5 ft 8 in (1.73 m)	Jr	Harrah	Harrah, OK
C	20	Regan Schumacher	6 ft 2 in (1.88 m)	So	Olathe East	Olathe, KS
G	21	Rylie Torrey	5 ft 11 in (1.8 m)	RS Jr	Locust Grove; Northeast State	Locust Grove, OK
G	22	Jordan Gilbert	5 ft 10 in (1.78 m)	RS Sr	Carl Albert	Midwest City, OK
G	23	Lakota Beatty	5 ft 8 in (1.73 m)	RS Sr	Anadarko; Oklahoma State	Anadarko, OK
C	24	Montserrat Brotons	6 ft 4 in (1.93 m)	RS Sr	Instituto Joaquim Blume	Cocentaina, Spain
G	32	Sarah Garvie	5 ft 8 in (1.73 m)	Jr	Burlington; Northern Oklahoma College	Burlington, OK
G	33	Keni Jo Lippe	5 ft 9 in (1.75 m)	So	Adair	Adair, OK
F	41	Jentry Holt	6 ft 3 in (1.91 m)	RS Sr	Elgin; Oklahoma State	Elgin, OK
F	55	Raelene Eddens	5 ft 11 in (1.8 m)	Fr	Homeschooled	Luther, OK

Head coach

- Misti Cussen (Southern Nazarene)

Assistant coach(es)

- Kyron Stokes (Oral Roberts)
- Lee Mayberry (Arkansas)
- Jaci Inman (Oral Roberts)

Legend

- (C) Team captain
- (S) Suspended
- (I) Ineligible
- (W) Walk-on
- Injured
- Current redshirt

Roster
Last update: July 8, 2024

== Schedule ==
Date time, TV	Rank^{#}	Opponent^{#}	Result	Record	Site (attendance) city, state
Exhibition
November 2, 2018*; 7:00 p.m.		Rockhurst	W 95–31		Mabee Center (723); Tulsa, OK
Non-conference regular season
November 6, 2018*; 7:00 p.m.		Harris–Stowe State	W 74–46	1–0	Mabee Center (841); Tulsa, OK
November 9, 2018*; 7:00 p.m.		at No. 13 Iowa State	L 77–90	1–1	Carver–Hawkeye Arena (3,644); Iowa City, IA
November 13, 2018*; 7:00 p.m., ESPN+		at Kansas	L 58–70	1–2	Allen Fieldhouse (1,819); Lawrence, KS
November 17, 2018*; 2:00 p.m.		Tulsa; PSO Mayor's Cup	L 68–76	1–3	Mabee Center (1,493); Tulsa, OK
November 20, 2018*; 7:00 p.m.		UMKC	W 75–64	2–3	Mabee Center (588); Tulsa, OK
November 24, 2018*; 7:00 p.m.		at Texas State	W 81–64	3–3	Strahan Arena (978); San Marcos, TX
November 28, 2018*; 7:00 p.m.		at Arkansas	L 61–74	3–4	Bud Walton Arena (1,119); Fayetteville, AR
December 1, 2018*; 2:00 p.m.		Southern Utah	W 64–59	4–4	Mabee Center (976); Tulsa, OK
December 3, 2018*; 11:00 a.m.		Central Christian	W 94–47	5–4	Mabee Center (3,061); Tulsa, OK
December 6, 2018*; 7:00 p.m.		UT Arlington	L 62–80	5–5	Mabee Center (1,245); Tulsa, OK
December 14, 2018*; 6:30 p.m.		at Sam Houston State	W 73–62	6–5	Bernard Johnson Coliseum (425); Huntsville, TX
December 16, 2018*; 2:00 p.m.		at Houston Baptist	W 74–56	7–5	Sharp Gymnasium (212); Houston, TX
December 21, 2018*; 7:00 p.m.		at Oklahoma State	L 69–89	7–6	Gallagher-Iba Arena (2,089); Stillwater, OK
Summit League regular season
December 30, 2018; 2:00 p.m.		at Omaha	W 71–56	8–6 (1–0)	Baxter Arena (278); Omaha, NE
January 2, 2019; 7:00 p.m.		North Dakota	L 67–75	8–7 (1–1)	Mabee Center (1,005); Tulsa, OK
January 5, 2019; 2:00 p.m.		Western Illinois	W 68–64	9–7 (2–1)	Mabee Center (1,083); Tulsa, OK
January 9, 2019; 7:00 p.m.		at Purdue Fort Wayne	W 72–61	10–7 (3–1)	Hilliard Gates Sports Center (302); Fort Wayne, IN
January 12, 2019; 2:00 p.m., ESPN3		at South Dakota State	L 55–68	10–8 (3–2)	Frost Arena (2,828); Vermillion, SD
January 18, 2019; 7:00 p.m.		South Dakota	L 72–76	10–9 (3–3)	Mabee Center (1,063); Tulsa, OK
January 20, 2019; 2:00 p.m.		at Denver	L 76–93	10–10 (3–4)	Magness Arena; Denver, CO
January 26, 2019; 2:00 p.m.		North Dakota State	W 101–72	11–10 (4–4)	Mabee Center (1,067); Tulsa, OK
January 30, 2019; 7:00 p.m.		Purdue Fort Wayne	W 66–56	12–10 (5–4)	Mabee Center (1,002); Tulsa, OK
February 2, 2019; 2:00 p.m.		South Dakota State	L 65–74	12–11 (5–5)	Mabee Center (1,140); Tulsa, OK
February 6, 2019; 7:00 p.m.		Denver	W 74–66	13–11 (6–5)	Mabee Center (1,029); Tulsa, OK
February 9, 2018; 1:00 p.m.		at South Dakota	L 64–75	13–12 (6–6)	Sanford Coyote Sports Center (2,242); Vermillion, SD
February 13, 2019; 7:00 p.m., ESPN3		at North Dakota State	W 65–54	14–12 (7–6)	Scheels Center (288); Fargo, ND
February 16, 2018; 2:00 p.m., ESPN3		at North Dakota	W 80–58	15–12 (8–6)	Betty Engelstad Sioux Center (1,551); Grand Forks, ND
February 23, 2018; 4:30 p.m., ESPN3		at Western Illinois	W 92–85	16–12 (9–6)	Western Hall (792); Macomb, IL
February 28, 2018; 5:00 p.m.		Omaha	W 65–64	17–12 (10–6)	Mabee Center (1,206); Tulsa, OK
Summit League women's tournament
March 10, 2019; 12:00 p.m., MidcoSN/ESPN3	(4)	vs. (5) Western Illinois; Quarterfinals	W 80–67	18–12	Denny Sanford Premier Center; Sioux Falls, SD
March 11, 2019; 12:00 p.m., MidcoSN/ESPN3	(4)	vs. (1) South Dakota State; Semifinals	L 55–86	18–13	Denny Sanford Premier Center; Sioux Falls, SD
*Non-conference game. ^{#}Rankings from AP poll. (#) Tournament seedings in parentheses. All times are in Central.

== See also ==
- 2018–19 Oral Roberts Golden Eagles men's basketball team
