= 2019 SEC women's basketball tournament =

- Classification: Division I
- Season: 2018–19
- Teams: 14
- Site: Bon Secours Wellness Arena; Greenville, SC
- Champions: Mississippi State (1st title)
- Winning coach: Vic Schaefer (1st title)
- MVP: Teaira McCowan (Mississippi State)
- Attendance: 32,180
- Television: SEC Network, ESPNU, ESPN2

2018–19 SEC women's basketball standings
	Conf.				Overall
Team	W		L	PCT	W		L	PCT
No. 4 Mississippi State †	15	–	1	.938	33	–	3	.917
No. 15 South Carolina	13	–	3	.813	23	–	9	.719
No. 14 Texas A&M	12	–	4	.750	26	–	7	.788
No. 17 Kentucky	11	–	5	.688	25	–	8	.758
Missouri	10	–	6	.625	24	–	11	.686
Auburn	9	–	7	.563	22	–	10	.688
Georgia	9	–	7	.563	18	–	12	.600
Tennessee	7	–	9	.438	19	–	13	.594
LSU	7	–	9	.438	16	–	13	.552
Arkansas	6	–	10	.375	22	–	15	.595
Alabama	5	–	11	.313	14	–	17	.452
Ole Miss	3	–	13	.188	9	–	22	.290
Florida	3	–	13	.188	8	–	23	.258
Vanderbilt	2	–	14	.125	7	–	23	.233
† 2019 SEC tournament winner Rankings from AP poll

The 2019 Southeastern Conference women's basketball tournament was the postseason women's basketball tournament for the Southeastern Conference held at the Bon Secours Wellness Arena in Greenville, South Carolina, from March 6 through 10, 2019. Mississippi State won its first-ever title to earn an automatic bid to the 2019 NCAA Women's Division I Basketball Tournament.

== Seeds ==
Seed	School	Conference record	Overall record	Tiebreaker
1	Mississippi State^{‡†}	15–1	27–2	
2	South Carolina^{†}	13–3	21–8	
3	Texas A&M^{†}	12–4	23–6	
4	Kentucky^{†}	11–5	24–6	
5	Missouri^{#}	10–6	21–9	
6	Auburn^{#}	9–7	21–8	1–0 vs. UGA
7	Georgia^{#}	9–7	18–11	0–1 vs. AUB
8	Tennessee^{#}	7–9	18–11	1–0 vs. LSU
9	LSU^{#}	7–9	16–12	0–1 vs. TEN
10	Arkansas^{#}	6–10	17–13	
11	Alabama	5–11	13–16	
12	Ole Miss	3–13	9–21	1–0 vs. FLA
13	Florida	3–13	7–22	0–1 vs. MISS
14	Vanderbilt	2–14	7–22	
‡ – SEC regular season champions, and tournament No. 1 seed. † – Received a double-bye in the conference tournament. # – Received a single-bye in the conference tournament. Overall records include all games played in the SEC Tournament.

== Schedule ==
Game	Time*	Matchup^{#}	Television	Attendance
First round – Wednesday, March 6
1	11:00 am	#12 Ole Miss vs. #13 Florida	SEC Network	4,148
2	1:30 pm	#11 Alabama vs. #14 Vanderbilt	SEC Network	4,148
Second round – Thursday, March 7
3	Noon	#8 Tennessee vs. #9 LSU	SEC Network	3,215
4	2:30 pm	#5 Missouri vs. #13 Florida	SEC Network	3,215
5	6:00 pm	#7 Georgia vs. #10 Arkansas	SEC Network	3,089
6	8:30 pm	#6 Auburn vs. #11 Alabama	SEC Network	3,089
Quarterfinals – Friday, March 8
7	Noon	#1 Mississippi State vs. #8 Tennessee	SEC Network	4,431
8	2:30 pm	#4 Kentucky vs. #5 Missouri	SEC Network	4,431
9	6:00 pm	#2 South Carolina vs. #10 Arkansas	SEC Network	5,709
10	8:30 pm	#3 Texas A&M vs. #6 Auburn	SEC Network	5,709
Semifinals – Saturday, March 9
11	5:00 pm	#1 Mississippi State vs #5 Missouri	ESPNU	5,817
12	7:30 pm	#10 Arkansas vs #3 Texas A&M	ESPNU	5,817
Championship – Sunday, March 10
13	2:00 pm	#1 Mississippi State vs #10 Arkansas	ESPN2	5,771
*Game times in ET. # – Rankings denote tournament seed

== Bracket ==
First round March 6, 2019; SECN
12	Ole Miss	57
13	Florida	64
11	Alabama	74
14	Vanderbilt	57

Second round March 7, 2019; SECN
8	Tennessee	69
9	LSU	66
5	Missouri	87
13	Florida	56
7	Georgia	76
10	Arkansas	86
6	Auburn	53
11	Alabama	52

Quarterfinals; March 8, 2019; SECN
1	Mississippi State	83
8	Tennessee	68
4	Kentucky	68
5	Missouri	70^{OT}
2	South Carolina	89
10	Arkansas	95
3	Texas A&M	64
6	Auburn	62

Semifinals; March 9, 2019; ESPNU
1	Mississippi State	71
5	Missouri	56
10	Arkansas	58
3	Texas A&M	51

Championship; March 10, 2019; ESPN2
1	Mississippi State	101
10	Arkansas	70

== See also ==
- 2019 SEC men's basketball tournament
