= 2018–19 North Dakota State Bison women's basketball team =

Intercollegiate basketball season

2018–19 North Dakota State Bison women's basketball
- Conference: Summit League
- Record: 7–22 (4–12 The Summit)
- Head coach: Maren Walseth (5th season)
- Assistant coaches: Keith Dickhudt; Nate Oakland; Morgan Paige
- Home arena: Scheels Center

2018–19 Summit League women's basketball standings
	Conf.				Overall
Team	W		L	PCT	W		L	PCT
South Dakota State †	15	–	1	.938	28	–	7	.800
South Dakota	14	–	2	.875	28	–	6	.824
Oral Roberts	10	–	6	.625	18	–	13	.581
Denver	10	–	6	.625	18	–	14	.563
Western Illinois	8	–	8	.500	12	–	18	.400
North Dakota	6	–	10	.375	12	–	19	.387
North Dakota State	4	–	12	.250	7	–	22	.241
Purdue Fort Wayne	3	–	13	.188	7	–	22	.241
Omaha	2	–	14	.125	8	–	21	.276
† 2019 Summit League Tournament winner Rankings from AP Poll

The 2018–19 North Dakota State Bison women's basketball team represented North Dakota State University in the 2018–19 NCAA Division I women's basketball season. The Bison, led fifth year head by Maren Walseth, played their home games at the Scheels Center and were members of The Summit League. They finished the season 7–22, 4–12 in Summit League play to finish in seventh place. They lost in the quarterfinals of the Summit League women's tournament to South Dakota.

Walseth and NDSU mutually agreed to part ways on March 11 after 5 seasons. The Bison went 40–106 overall in Walseth's tenure.

== Roster ==
2018–19 North Dakota State Bison women's basketball team
Players
Coaches

Pos.	#	Name	Height	Year	Previous school	Hometown
F	2	Reagan Heun	5 ft 10 in (1.78 m)	Fr	Canyon Lake	Spring Branch, TX
G	4	Sofija Zivaljevic	5 ft 10 in (1.78 m)	RS So	ŽKK Budućnost Bemax; Iowa State	Podgorica, Montenegro
G	12	Sarah Jacobson	5 ft 8 in (1.73 m)	Jr	Shanley	Fargo, ND
G	13	Cirkeline Rimdal	6 ft 0 in (1.83 m)	Fr	Køge Gymnasium; SISU Copenhagen	Køge, Denmark
F	14	Macey Kvilvang	6 ft 5 in (1.96 m)	So	North Star	Cando, ND
F	21	Rylee Nudell	5 ft 10 in (1.78 m)	Jr	Maple Valley	Buffalo, ND
G	22	Michelle Gaislerova	5 ft 11 in (1.8 m)	So	Lincoln Christian School	Trutnov, Czech Republic
G	24	Tyrah Spencer	5 ft 9 in (1.75 m)	Jr	Bloomington Kennedy	Oakdale, MN
G	31	Marina Fernandez	6 ft 0 in (1.83 m)	Sr	IES Rafael Casanova; Casper CC	Barcelona, Spain
F	32	Reilly Jacobson	6 ft 2 in (1.88 m)	Jr	Waukee	Waukee, IA
G	33	Raquel Terrer van Gool	5 ft 11 in (1.8 m)	Fr	IES Miguel Servet	Zaragoza, Spain
F	34	Emily Dietz	6 ft 3 in (1.91 m)	So	Shanley	West Fargo, ND
C	44	Danneka Voegeli	6 ft 2 in (1.88 m)	So	Winona	Winona, MN

Head coach

- Maren Walseth (Penn State)

Assistant coach(es)

- Keith Dickhudt (North Dakota State)
- Nate Oakland (Northern Iowa)
- Morgan Paige (Wisconsin)

Legend

- (C) Team captain
- (S) Suspended
- (I) Ineligible
- (W) Walk-on
- Injured
- Current redshirt

Roster

== Schedule ==
Date time, TV	Rank^{#}	Opponent^{#}	Result	Record	Site (attendance) city, state
Exhibition
Oct 30, 2018*; 7:00 pm, MidcoSN/ESPN+		Minnesota Duluth	L 65–70		Scheels Center (408); Fargo, ND
Regular season
Nov 6, 2018*; 7:00 pm, MidcoSN/ESPN+		Mayville State	W 49–43	1–0	Scheels Center (462); Fargo, ND
Nov 9, 2018*; 5:00 pm, MidcoSN/ESPN+		Creighton	L 51–86	1–1	Scheels Center (507); Fargo, ND
Nov 11, 2018*; 4:00 pm, MidcoSN/ESPN+		New Hampshire	W 56–51	2–1	Scheels Center (613); Fargo, ND
Nov 17, 2018*; 12:00 pm		at Wisconsin	L 53–64	2–2	Kohl Center (3,275); Madison, WI
Nov 23, 2018*; 5:00 pm		at Pacific; Tiger Turkey Tip Off	L 68–75	2–3	Alex G. Spanos Center (461); Stockton, CA
Nov 24, 2018*; 2:30 pm		vs. North Texas; Tiger Turkey Tip Off	L 78–92	2–4	Alex G. Spanos Center (133); Stockton, CA
Nov 28, 2018*; 11:00 am, ESPN+		at Northern Illinois	L 63–81	2–5	Convocation Center (1,202); DeKalb, IL
Dec 2, 2018*; 1:00 pm		UMKC	L 59–69	2–6	Scheels Center (458); Fargo, ND
Dec 9, 2018*; 1:00 pm, MidcoSN/ESPN+		Milwaukee	L 55–57	2–7	Scheels Center (545); Fargo, ND
Dec 16, 2018*; 1:00 pm, ESPN+		at Valparaiso	W 51–48	3–7	Athletics–Recreation Center (368); Valparaiso, IN
Dec 19, 2018*; 2:00 pm		vs. San Francisco; Hatter Classic	L 42–75	3–8	Edmunds Center (105); DeLand, FL
Dec 21, 2018*; 10:00 am, ESPN+		at Stetson; Hatter Classic	L 59–60	3–9	Edmunds Center (306); DeLand, FL
Dec 28, 2018; 5:00 pm, MidcoSN/ESPN+		Purdue Fort Wayne	W 70–54	4–9 (1–0)	Scheels Center (280); Fargo, ND
Dec 30, 2018; 1:00 pm, MidcoSN/ESPN+		South Dakota	L 41–67	4–10 (1–1)	Scheels Center (520); Fargo, ND
Jan 6, 2019; 2:00 pm, MidcoSN2/ESPN+		at Omaha	L 61–78	4–11 (1–2)	Baxter Arena (351); Omaha, NE
Jan 11, 2019; 7:00 pm, MidcoSN2/ESPN+		Western Illinois	W 68–60	5–11 (2–2)	Scheels Center (378); Fargo, ND
Jan 17, 2019; 8:00 pm		at Denver	L 54–81	5–12 (2–3)	Hamilton Gymnasium (257); Denver, CO
Jan 20, 2019; 1:00 pm, MidcoSN/ESPN+		North Dakota	W 69–57	6–12 (3–3)	Scheels Center (1,810); Fargo, ND
Jan 23, 2019; 7:00 pm, MidcoSN2/ESPN+		at South Dakota State	L 33–86	6–13 (3–4)	Frost Arena (1,679); Brookings, SD
Jan 26, 2019; 2:00 pm		at Oral Roberts	L 72–101	6–14 (3–5)	Mabee Center (1,067); Tulsa, OK
Jan 30, 2019*; 6:00 pm, MidcoSN/ESPN3		Waldorf; Canceled; inclement weather			Scheels Center; Fargo, ND
Feb 3, 2019; 1:00 pm, ESPN+		at Western Illinois	L 70–82	6–15 (3–6)	Western Hall (417); Macomb, IL
Feb 7, 2019; 7:00 pm, MidcoSN/ESPN3		at North Dakota	L 58–70	6–16 (3–7)	Betty Engelstad Sioux Center (1,567); Grand Forks, ND
Feb 9, 2019; 1:00 pm, MidcoSN2/ESPN3		Denver	L 67–87	6–17 (3–8)	Scheels Center (742); Fargo, ND
Feb 13, 2019; 7:00 pm, MidcoSN/ESPN3		Oral Roberts	L 54–65	6–18 (3–9)	Scheels Center (288); Fargo, ND
Feb 16, 2019; 1:00 pm, MidcoSN/ESPN3		South Dakota State	L 48–88	6–19 (3–10)	Scheels Center (896); Fargo, ND
Feb 23, 2019; 1:00 pm, MidcoSN/ESPN3		Omaha	W 55–48	7–19 (4–10)	Scheels Center (356); Fargo, ND
Feb 28, 2018; 5:30 pm, MidcoSN/ESPN+		at South Dakota	L 57–76	7–20 (4–11)	Sanford Coyote Sports Center (2,383); Vermillion, SD
Mar 2, 2019; 1:00 pm		at Purdue Fort Wayne	L 46–66	7–21 (4–12)	Gates Sports Center (482); Fort Wayne, IN
The Summit League Women's Tournament
Mar 9, 2019; 2:30 pm, MidcoSN/ESPN+	(7)	vs. (2) South Dakota; Quarterfinals	L 51–74	7–22	Denny Sanford Premier Center (7,137); Sioux Falls, SD
*Non-conference game. ^{#}Rankings from AP Poll. (#) Tournament seedings in parentheses. All times are in Central Time.

== See also ==
- 2018–19 North Dakota State Bison men's basketball team
