= 2018–19 Syracuse Orange women's basketball team =

Intercollegiate basketball season

2018–19 Syracuse Orange women's basketball

Cancún Challenge Riviera Division Champions

NCAA tournament, second round
- Conference: Atlantic Coast Conference

Ranking
- Coaches: No. 16
- AP: No. 12
- Record: 25–9 (11–5 ACC)
- Head coach: Quentin Hillsman (12th season)
- Assistant coaches: Vonn Read; Tammi Reiss; Adeniyi Amadou
- Home arena: Carrier Dome

2018–19 ACC women's basketball standings
	Conf.				Overall
Team	W		L	PCT	W		L	PCT
No. 3 Notre Dame†	14	–	2	.875	35	–	4	.897
No. 5 Louisville	14	–	2	.875	32	–	4	.889
No. 10 NC State	12	–	4	.750	28	–	6	.824
No. 19 Miami (FL)	12	–	4	.750	25	–	9	.735
No. 12 Syracuse	11	–	5	.688	25	–	9	.735
No. 25 Florida State	10	–	6	.625	24	–	9	.727
Clemson	9	–	7	.563	20	–	13	.606
North Carolina	8	–	8	.500	18	–	15	.545
Georgia Tech	7	–	9	.438	17	–	13	.567
Virginia Tech	6	–	10	.375	22	–	12	.647
Duke	6	–	10	.375	15	–	15	.500
Virginia	5	–	11	.313	12	–	19	.387
Boston College	3	–	13	.188	14	–	16	.467
Pittsburgh	2	–	14	.125	11	–	20	.355
Wake Forest	1	–	15	.063	10	–	20	.333
† 2019 ACC tournament winner As of March 7, 2019; Rankings from AP poll

The 2018–19 Syracuse Orange women's basketball team represented Syracuse University during the 2018–19 NCAA Division I women's basketball season. The Orange were led by twelfth year head coach Quentin Hillsman. The Orange were sixth year members of the Atlantic Coast Conference and played their home games at the Carrier Dome. They finished the season 25–9, 11–5 in ACC play to finish in fifth place. They advanced to the semifinals of the ACC women's tournament, where they lost to Notre Dame. They received an at-large bid to the NCAA women's tournament, receiving a No. 3 seed in the Portland regional, where they defeated Fordham in the first round before being upset by South Dakota State in the second round.

== Previous season ==
For the 2017–18 season, the Orange finished 10–6 in ACC play and 22–9 overall. Their record achieved a tie for sixth in the ACC. Syracuse was eliminated in the second round of the ACC tournament by Virginia Tech. The Orange received an at-large bid to the NCAA tournament as an eight-seed, they lost in the first round to Oklahoma State.

== Off-season ==
=== Recruiting class ===
College recruiting information
Name	Hometown	School	Height	Weight	Commit date
Emily Engstler; G/F	Fresh Meadows, New York	St. Francis Preparatory School	6 ft 2 in (1.88 m)	N/A	
Emily Engstler; G/F	Recruit ratings: ESPN: (98)				
Kadiatou Sissoko; G	Paris, France	Ropazu	6 ft 2 in (1.88 m)	N/A	
Kadiatou Sissoko; G	Recruit ratings: ESPN: (98)				
Kenza Salgues; G	Paris, France	INSEP Academy	5 ft 8 in (1.73 m)	N/A	
Kenza Salgues; G	Recruit ratings: ESPN: (90)				
Taleah Washington; PG	District Heights, Maryland	Rock Creek Christian Academy	5 ft 8 in (1.73 m)	N/A	
Taleah Washington; PG	Recruit ratings: ESPN: (89)				
Overall recruit ranking:
Note: In many cases, Scout, Rivals, 247Sports, On3, and ESPN may conflict in their listings of height and weight.; In these cases, the average was taken. ESPN grades are on a 100-point scale.; Sources:

== Roster ==
2018–19 Syracuse Orange women's basketball team
Players
Coaches

Pos.	#	Name	Height	Year	Previous school	Hometown
G	1	Raven Fox	5 ft 8 in (1.73 m)	Sr	Elizabeth Seton	Bladensburg, MD
G	2	Chelayne Bailey	5 ft 6 in (1.68 m)	Jr	Pickering	Pickering, ON
F	3	Maeva Djaldi–Tabdi	6 ft 2 in (1.88 m)	RS Fr	Jean Moulin	Paris, France
G	4	Tiana Mangakahia	5 ft 6 in (1.68 m)	Jr	Lake Ginninderra	Meadowbrook, QLD, Australia
F	10	Marie–Paule Foppossi	6 ft 1 in (1.85 m)	RS Fr	Lycée Marcelin Berthelot	Strasbourg, France
G	11	Gabrielle Cooper	5 ft 10 in (1.78 m)	Jr	Morgan Park	Lansing, IL
G	12	Kiara Lewis	5 ft 8 in (1.73 m)	RS So	Whitney Young	Chicago, IL
G	13	Veronika Vorackova	5 ft 9 in (1.75 m)	Fr	None	České Budějovice, Czech Republic
G/F	21	Emily Engstler	6 ft 1 in (1.85 m)	Fr	St. Francis Prep	Fresh Meadows, NY
C	22	Amaya Finklea–Guity	6 ft 4 in (1.93 m)	So	Noble & Greenough	Dorchester, MA
G	23	Isis Young	5 ft 7 in (1.7 m)	RS Sr	Life Center Academy	Berlin, NJ
G	24	Brandi Fowler	5 ft 4 in (1.63 m)	Sr	Corcoran	Syracuse, NY
G	25	Lauren Fitzmaurice	5 ft 8 in (1.73 m)	So	Liberty Bell	Mazama, WA
G	30	Kadi Sissoko	6 ft 2 in (1.88 m)	Fr	Ropazu	Paris, France
F	32	Miranda Drummond	6 ft 1 in (1.85 m)	RS Sr	Harpursville; St. Bonaventure	Binghamton, NY
F	45	Digna Strautmane	6 ft 2 in (1.88 m)	So	Riga 66	Riga, Latvia

Head coach

- Quentin Hillsman (St. Mary's (MD))

Assistant coach(es)

- Vonn Read (Clark Atlanta)
- Adeniyi Amadou (Indiana (PA))
- Tammi Reiss (Virginia)

Legend

- (C) Team captain
- (S) Suspended
- (I) Ineligible
- (W) Walk-on
- Injured
- Current redshirt

Roster
Last update: October 29, 2018

== Schedule ==
Date time, TV	Rank^{#}	Opponent^{#}	Result	Record	Site (attendance) city, state
Non-conference regular season
November 6, 2018*; 3:00 pm, ACCN Extra	No. 18	North Dakota	W 85–49	1–0	Carrier Dome (1,161); Syracuse, NY
November 10, 2018*; 4:00 pm	No. 18	at No. 3 Oregon	L 73–75	1–1	Matthew Knight Arena (4,334); Eugene, OR
November 14, 2018*; 7:00 pm, ACCN Extra	No. 18	vs. No. 20 Texas A&M	W 75–65	2–1	Westchester County Center (211); White Plains, NY
November 18, 2018*; 2:00 pm, ACCN Extra	No. 18	Bucknell	W 70–56	3–1	Carrier Dome (1,409); Syracuse, NY
November 22, 2018*; 1:30 pm	No. 14	vs. Kansas State; Cancún Challenge Riviera Division	W 70–61	4–1	Moon Palace Golf & Spa Resort; Cancún, Mexico
November 23, 2018*; 1:30 pm	No. 14	vs. Princeton; Cancún Challenge Riviera Division	W 92–61	5–1	Moon Palace Golf & Spa Resort; Cancún, Mexico
November 24, 2018*; 1:30 pm	No. 14	vs. No. 16 DePaul; Cancún Challenge Riviera Division	W 83–81 ^{OT}	6–1	Moon Palace Golf & Spa Resort (300); Cancún, Mexico
November 29, 2018*; 6:30 pm, BTN	No. 12	at No. 20 Minnesota; ACC–Big Ten Women's Challenge	L 68–72	6–2	Williams Arena (4,178); Minneapolis, MN
December 2, 2018*; 2:00 pm, ACCN Extra	No. 12	Towson	W 98–55	7–2	Carrier Dome (1,450); Syracuse, NY
December 5, 2018*; 7:00 pm, ACCN Extra	No. 15	Maryland Eastern Shore	W 96–51	8–2	Carrier Dome (1,155); Syracuse, NY
December 17, 2018*; 11:00 am, ACCN Extra	No. 15	Niagara	W 94–45	9–2	Carrier Dome (6,093); Syracuse, NY
December 21, 2018*; 7:30 pm	No. 15	vs. Duquesne; St. Pete Classic	W 87–71	10–2	McArthur Center (264); St. Petersburg, FL
December 22, 2018*; 7:30 pm	No. 15	vs. UCF; St. Pete Classic	W 57–52	11–2	McArthur Center (204); St. Petetersburg, FL
ACC regular season
January 3, 2019; 7:00 pm, ACCN Extra	No. 14	at Clemson	W 84–75	12–2 (1–0)	Littlejohn Coliseum (781); Clemson, SC
January 6, 2019; 2:00 pm, ACCN Extra	No. 14	at Virginia Tech	W 75–73 ^{OT}	13–2 (2–0)	Cassell Coliseum (2,287); Blacksburg, VA
January 13, 2019; 3:00 pm, ACCN Extra	No. 12	North Carolina	W 90–77	14–2 (3–0)	Carrier Dome (4,982); Syracuse, NY
January 17, 2019; 7:00 pm, ACCN Extra	No. 12	at Pittsburgh	W 82–50	15–2 (4–0)	Petersen Events Center (752); Pittsburgh, PA
January 20, 2019; 2:00 pm, ACCN Extra	No. 12	at Georgia Tech	L 55–65	15–3 (4–1)	McCamish Pavilion (2,106); Atlanta, GA
January 23, 2019; 7:00 pm, ACCN Extra	No. 13	Miami (FL)	L 71–84	15–4 (4–2)	Carrier Dome (1,332); Syracuse, NY
January 27, 2019; 1:00 pm, RSN	No. 13	at Duke	W 64–55	16–4 (5–2)	Cameron Indoor Stadium (4,004); Durham, NC
January 31, 2019; 7:00 pm, ACCN Extra	No. 18	Virginia	W 72–68	17–4 (6–2)	Carrier Dome (1,585); Syracuse, NY
February 7, 2019; 7:00 pm, ACCN Extra	No. 15	at No. 2 Louisville	L 51–76	17–5 (6–3)	KFC Yum! Center (8,521); Louisville, KY
February 10, 2019; 2:00 pm, ACCN Extra	No. 15	Boston College	W 96–69	18–5 (7–3)	Carrier Dome (2,730); Syracuse, NY
February 13, 2019; 7:00 pm, ACCN Extra	No. 16	No. 12 NC State	L 73–77	18–6 (7–4)	Carrier Dome; Syracuse, NY
February 17, 2019; 2:00 pm, ACCN Extra	No. 16	Wake Forest	W 77–57	19–6 (8–4)	Carrier Dome (2,579); Syracuse, NY
February 21, 2019; 7:00 pm, ACCN Extra	No. 18	Pittsburgh	W 90–63	20–6 (9–4)	Carrier Dome (1,585); Syracuse, NY
February 25, 2019; 6:00 pm, ESPN2	No. 17	No. 4 Notre Dame	L 68–98	20–7 (9–5)	Carrier Dome (7,556); Syracuse, NY
February 28, 2019; 7:00 pm, ACCN Extra	No. 17	at No. 22 Florida State	W 94–88	21–7 (10–5)	Donald L. Tucker Center (2,732); Tallahassee, FL
March 3, 2019; 2:00 pm, ACCN Extra	No. 17	at Boston College	W 76–59	22–7 (11–5)	Conte Forum (2,245); Chestnut Hill, MA
ACC Women's Tournament
March 7, 2019; 11:00 am, RSN	(5) No. 18	vs. (12) Virginia; Second Round	W 67–57	23–7	Greensboro Coliseum (6,522); Greensboro, NC
March 8, 2019; 11:00 am, RSN	(5) No. 18	vs. (4) Miami (FL); Quarterfinals	W 92–85	24–7	Greensboro Coliseum (8,121); Greensboro, NC
March 9, 2019; 12:00 pm, ESPNU	(5) No. 18	vs. (1) No. 4 Notre Dame; Semifinals	L 66–91	24–8	Greensboro Coliseum (6,943); Greensboro, NC
NCAA Women's Tournament
March 23, 2019*; 1:00 pm, ESPN2	(3 P) No. 12	(14 P) Fordham; First Round	W 70–49	25–8	Carrier Dome (2,785); Syracuse, NY
March 25, 2019*; 7:00 pm, ESPN	(3 P) No. 12	(6 P) South Dakota State; Second Round	L 64–75	25–9	Carrier Dome (2,474); Syracuse, NY
*Non-conference game. ^{#}Rankings from AP Poll. (#) Tournament seedings in parentheses. P=Portland. All times are in Eastern.

== Rankings ==
Regular season polls
Poll	Pre- Season	Week 2	Week 3	Week 4	Week 5	Week 6	Week 7	Week 8	Week 9	Week 10	Week 11	Week 12	Week 13	Week 14	Week 15	Week 16	Week 17	Week 18	Week 19	Final
AP	18	18	14	12	15	15	15	15	14	12	12	13	18	15	16	18	17	18	15	N/A
Coaches	18	15	12	12	14	14	14	14	14	12	12	14	16	14	16	18	17	16	14	16

Legend
	Increase in ranking
	Decrease in ranking
	Not ranked previous week
(RV)	Received Votes

The Coaches Poll releases a final poll after the NCAA tournament, but the AP Poll does not release a poll at this time.

== See also ==
- 2018–19 Syracuse Orange men's basketball team
