= Niecee Nelson =

American basketball player and coach

Biographical details
- Born: February 18, 1979 (age 47)

Playing career
- 1997–2002: Concordia (OR)

Coaching career (HC unless noted)
- 2002–2004: Wyoming (GA)
- 2004–2005: IPFW (assistant)
- 2005–2016: San Diego (assistant)
- 2016–2021: IPFW / Purdue Fort Wayne

Head coaching record
- Overall: 22–116 (.159)

Niecee Nelson (born February 18, 1979) was the head women's basketball coach at Fort Wayne, serving from 2016 through 2021. Nelson previously served as an assistant coach at IPFW from 2004–05. She also was an assistant coach for San Diego Toreros women's basketball and as a graduate assistant coach for Wyoming.

At the time of her dismissal from Purdue-Fort Wayne, she was the subject of a "months-long 2020 investigation by IndyStar looking into alleged toxic abuse in her program."

Nelson graduated from Concordia University in 2002 and University of Wyoming with a Master's degree in 2004. She is married to her husband Steve.
