= 2019 Summit League women's basketball tournament =

- Classification: Division I
- Season: 2018–19
- Teams: 8
- Site: Denny Sanford Premier Center; Sioux Falls, South Dakota
- Champions: South Dakota State (9th title)
- Winning coach: Aaron Johnston (9th title)
- MVP: Macy Miller (South Dakota State)
- Attendance: 24,193
- Television: Midco Sport Network, ESPNU

2018–19 Summit League women's basketball standings
	Conf.				Overall
Team	W		L	PCT	W		L	PCT
South Dakota State †	15	–	1	.938	28	–	7	.800
South Dakota	14	–	2	.875	28	–	6	.824
Oral Roberts	10	–	6	.625	18	–	13	.581
Denver	10	–	6	.625	18	–	14	.563
Western Illinois	8	–	8	.500	12	–	18	.400
North Dakota	6	–	10	.375	12	–	19	.387
North Dakota State	4	–	12	.250	7	–	22	.241
Purdue Fort Wayne	3	–	13	.188	7	–	22	.241
Omaha	2	–	14	.125	8	–	21	.276
† 2019 Summit League Tournament winner Rankings from AP Poll

The 2019 Summit League women's basketball tournament was a post-season women's basketball tournament for The Summit League. The tournament took place March 9–12, 2019, at the Denny Sanford Premier Center in Sioux Falls, South Dakota. The Top 8 teams in the final standings qualified for the tournament.

== Seeds ==
The top eight teams by conference record in the Summit League are eligible to compete in the conference tournament. Teams are to be seeded by record within the conference, with a tiebreaker system to seed teams with identical conference records. South Dakota State, South Dakota, Oral Roberts, Denver, Western Illinois, North Dakota, and North Dakota State, and Purdue Fort Wayne all qualified.

Seed	School	Conference Record	Tiebreaker
1	South Dakota State	15–1	
2	South Dakota	14–2	
3	Oral Roberts	10–6	2-0 vs Denver
4	Denver	10–6	0-2 vs Oral Roberts
5	Western Illinois	8–8	
6	North Dakota	6–10	
7	North Dakota State	4–12	
8	Purdue Fort Wayne	3–13	
-	Omaha	2–14	

== Schedule and results ==
Game	Time	Matchup	Score	Television
Quarterfinals – Saturday, March 9
1	12:00 PM	#1 South Dakota State vs. #8 Purdue Fort Wayne	88-50	MidcoSN/ESPN+
2	2:30 pm	#2 South Dakota vs. #7 North Dakota State	74-51	MidcoSN/ESPN+
Quarterfinals – Sunday, March 10
3	12:00 pm	#4 Oral Roberts vs. #5 Western Illinois	80-67	MidcoSN/ESPN+
4	2:30 pm	#3 Denver vs. #6 North Dakota	68-64	MidcoSN/ESPN+
Semifinals – Monday, March 11
5	12:00 pm	#1 South Dakota State vs. #4 Oral Roberts	86-55	MidcoSN/ESPN+
6	2:30 pm	#2 South Dakota vs. #6 North Dakota	84-61	MidcoSN/ESPN+
Final – Tuesday, March 12
7	1:00 pm	#1 South Dakota State vs. #2 South Dakota	83-71	ESPNU
*Game times in CST. Rankings denote tournament seed

== Bracket ==
Quarterfinals; March 9 & 10
1	South Dakota State	88
8	Purdue Fort Wayne	50
4	Oral Roberts	68
5	Western Illinois	64
2	South Dakota	74
7	North Dakota State	51
3	Denver	67
6	North Dakota	80

Semifinals; March 11
1	South Dakota State	86
4	Oral Roberts	55
2	South Dakota	84
6	North Dakota	61

Championship; March 12
1	South Dakota State	83
2	South Dakota	71
