= Dover-Eyota High School =

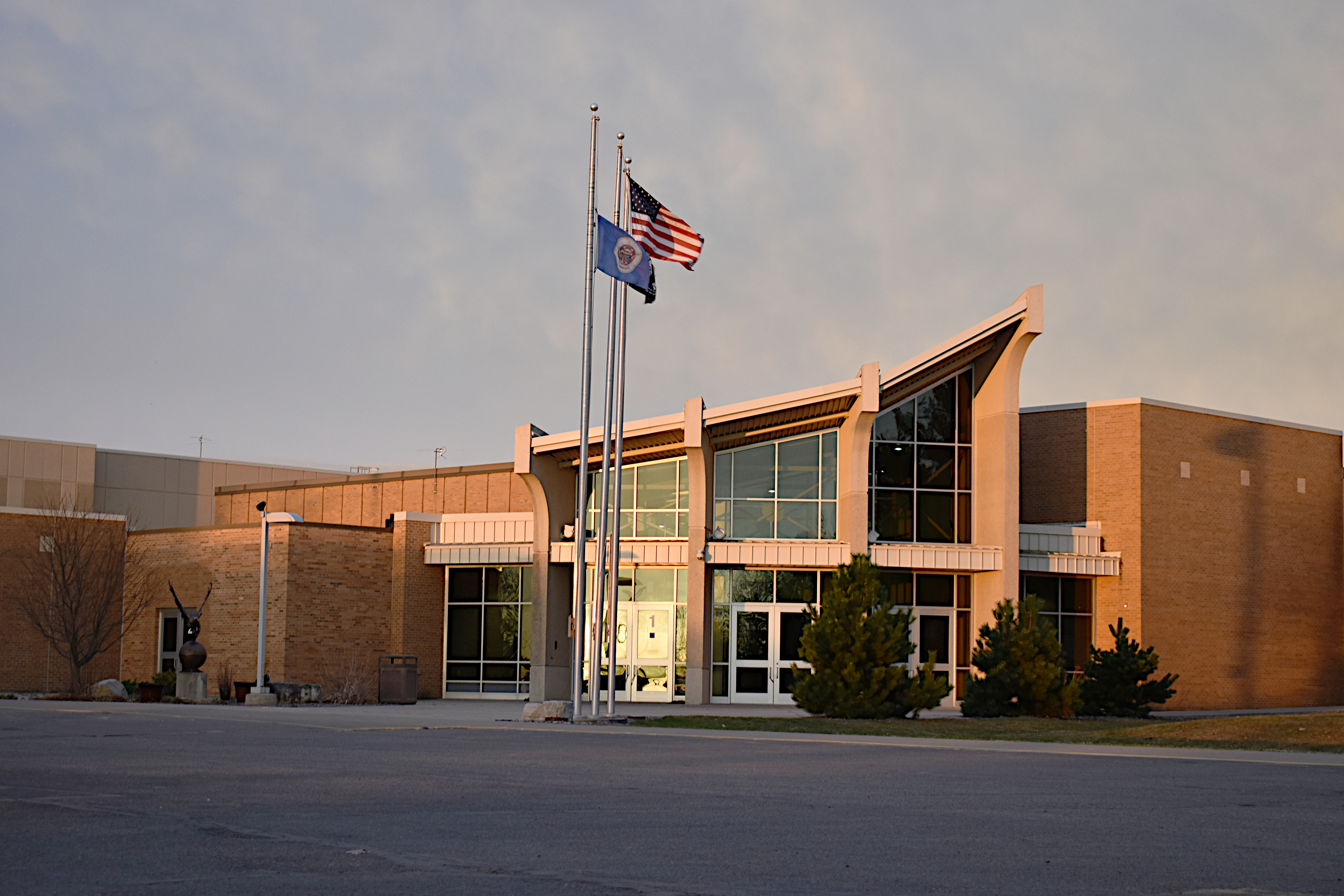

Location
- 615 S Ave SW; Eyota, Minnesota 55934; United States; 43.983°N 92.231°W

Information
- School type: Public
- Established: 1961
- School district: Dover-Eyota School District
- Superintendent: Jeremy Frie
- Principal: Sarah Carlson
- Teaching staff: 15.80 (FTE)
- Grades: 9–12
- Average class size: 82
- Student to teacher ratio: 19.18
- Colors: Maroon and Gold
- Fight song: On Wisconsin
- Athletics conference: MSHSL Region 1A; Three Rivers-North
- Mascot: Eagles
- Newspaper: The Eagle= sites.google.com/deschools.org/eaglenewspaper/home
- Website: www.desch.org

Dover-Eyota High School is a public high school located in Eyota, Minnesota. As of 2021, Dover-Eyota High School has approximately 600 students.

== Athletics ==
In the fall of 2003 Dover-Eyota High School opened a new gym with a large mural of a bald eagle on the east side.

Dover-Eyota State Team Participants

- Football (1993,1998, 2000)
- Baseball (2000)
- Boys Basketball (2006)
- Wrestling (1993, 2007, 2022–4th)
- Girls Cross-Country (2010–3rd, 2012–5th, 2013–11th, 2014–11th)
- Girls Soccer (2016, 2015, 2014)
- Girls Basketball (2015-Class 2A State Champions)
- Dance (2012– 11th in high kick), (2014– High Kick and Jazz), (2013– High Kick-12th place) (2007– High Kick and Jazz)

== Arts ==
The Dover Eyota High School Band was ranked named a Grammy Signature School Semi-Finalist in 2012 and 2013.

In 2020, the 2019–2020 Dover Eyota High School Concert Band selected to perform at the Minnesota Music Educators Association (MMEA) Midwinter Clinic.

== Notable alumni ==
- Logan Clark, professional mixed martial artist and college football player for Hamline University.
