= 2016 Horizon League women's basketball tournament =

- Classification: Division I
- Season: 2015–16
- Teams: 10
- Site: Kress Events Center; Green Bay, Wisconsin
- Champions: Green Bay (14th title)
- Winning coach: Kevin Borseth (10th title)
- MVP: Mehryn Kraker (Green Bay)
- Television: ESPN3, TWCS and ESPNU

2015–16 Horizon League women's basketball standings
	Conf.				Overall
Team	W		L	PCT	W		L	PCT
Green Bay †	16	–	2	.889	28	–	5	.848
Wright State	12	–	6	.667	24	–	11	.686
Milwaukee	12	–	6	.667	19	–	13	.594
Detroit	11	–	7	.611	15	–	15	.500
Youngstown State	9	–	9	.500	21	–	13	.618
Northern Kentucky*	9	–	9	.500	19	–	14	.576
Oakland	7	–	11	.389	15	–	15	.500
Cleveland State	6	–	12	.333	9	–	20	.310
Valparaiso	5	–	13	.278	10	–	21	.323
Illinois-Chicago	3	–	15	.167	12	–	18	.400
† 2016 Horizon League Tournament winner * Ineligible for NCAA postseason during transition to Division I. As of March 23, 2016; Rankings from AP poll

The 2016 Horizon League women's basketball tournament was a postseason tournament from March 10 through March 13. For the first time every game will be available on an ESPN Network. Rounds 1 & 2 will be on ESPN3, with the semifinals on TWCS and simulcast on ESPN3. The championship will be on ESPNU. As a D2 to D1 transitioning school, Northern Kentucky were ineligible to compete in the NCAA tournament until the 2018 season, so they can not win the conference tournament since the winner received an automatic bid to the NCAA Tournament. However Northern Kentucky is eligible to win the regular season title and is eligible to compete in the WNIT or WBI should they be invited. The tournament champion will receive an automatic bid to the NCAA women's tournament.

== Seeds ==
All 10 Horizon League schools participate in the tournament. Teams are seeded by 2015–16 Horizon League season record. The top 6 teams received a first-round bye and top 2 teams will get a double bye. Seeding for the tournament was determined at the close of the regular conference season:

Seed	Team	Record	Tiebreaker
1	Green Bay	16–2	
2	Milwaukee	12–4	2–0 vs. Wright State
3	Wright State	12–4	0–2 vs. Milwaukee
4	Detroit	9–7	
5	Northern Kentucky	9–9	2–0 vs. Youngstown State
6	Youngstown State	9–9	0–2 vs. Northern Kentucky
7	Oakland	7–11	
8	Cleveland State	6–12	
9	Valparaiso	5–13	
10	UIC	3–15	

== Schedule ==
Game	Time*	Matchup^{#}	Television
First round – Thursday, March 10 (Hosted by Green Bay)
1	12:00 PM	#9 Valparaiso vs #4 Detroit	ESPN3
2	2:30 PM	#8 Cleveland State vs #5 Northern Kentucky	ESPN3
3	5:00 PM	#10 UIC vs #3 Wright State	ESPN3
4	7:30 PM	#7 Oakland vs #6 Youngstown State	ESPN3
Quarterfinals - Friday, March 11
5	5:00 PM	#9 Valparaiso vs #5 Northern Kentucky	ESPN3
6	7:30 PM	#6 Youngstown State vs #3 Wright State	ESPN3
Semifinals – Saturday, March 12
7	3:00 PM	#5 Northern Kentucky at #1 Green Bay	TWCS
7	5:30 PM	#3 Wright State vs. #2 Milwaukee	TWCS
Championship – Sunday, March 13
8	12:00 PM	#2 Milwaukee at #1 Green Bay	ESPNU
*First and second round times are local time. Semifinal and championship times are in Central Time Zone. *Rankings denote tournament seeding.

== Tournament bracket ==
First round Thursday, March 10
4	Detroit	91
9	Valparaiso	94*
5	Northern Kentucky	71
8	Cleveland State	59
3	Wright State	71
10	UIC	55
6	Youngstown State	65
7	Oakland	63

Second round Friday, March 11
9	Valparaiso	53
5	Northern Kentucky	76
3	Wright State	81
6	Youngstown State	54

Semifinals; Saturday, March 12
1	Green Bay	80**
5	Northern Kentucky	78
2	Milwaukee	68
3	Wright State	60

Championship; Sunday, March 13
1	Green Bay	64
2	Milwaukee	32

* - denotes overtime period
