= 2015–16 Green Bay Phoenix women's basketball team =

Intercollegiate basketball season

2015–16 Green Bay Phoenix women's basketball

Horizon League Regular Season & Tournament Champions

NCAA Women's tournament, first round
- Conference: Horizon League
- Record: 28–5 (16–2 Horizon)
- Head coach: Kevin Borseth (13th season)
- Assistant coaches: Amanda Leonhard-Perry; Sarah Bronk; Megan Vogel
- Home arena: Kress Events Center

2015–16 Horizon League women's basketball standings
	Conf.				Overall
Team	W		L	PCT	W		L	PCT
Green Bay †	16	–	2	.889	28	–	5	.848
Wright State	12	–	6	.667	24	–	11	.686
Milwaukee	12	–	6	.667	19	–	13	.594
Detroit	11	–	7	.611	15	–	15	.500
Youngstown State	9	–	9	.500	21	–	13	.618
Northern Kentucky*	9	–	9	.500	19	–	14	.576
Oakland	7	–	11	.389	15	–	15	.500
Cleveland State	6	–	12	.333	9	–	20	.310
Valparaiso	5	–	13	.278	10	–	21	.323
Illinois-Chicago	3	–	15	.167	12	–	18	.400
† 2016 Horizon League Tournament winner * Ineligible for NCAA postseason during transition to Division I. As of March 23, 2016; Rankings from AP poll

The 2015–16 Green Bay Phoenix women's basketball team represented the University of Wisconsin-Green Bay in the 2015–16 NCAA Division I women's basketball season. The Phoenix, led by head coach Kevin Borseth, in his 13th year overall at Green Bay and the fourth of his current stint at the school, played their home games at the Kress Events Center and were members of the Horizon League. It was the 37th season of Green Bay women's basketball. They finished the season 28–5, 16–2 in Horizon play to win the Horizon League regular and tournament titles to earn an automatic to the NCAA women's tournament. They lost to Tennessee in the first round.

== Roster ==
2015–16 Green Bay Phoenix women's basketball team
Players
Coaches

Pos.	#	Name	Height	Year	Previous school	Hometown
G	1	Jen Wellnitz	5 ft 8 in (1.73 m)	RS Fr	Black Hawk	South Wayne, WI
G	2	Tesha Buck	5 ft 11 in (1.8 m)	Jr	Red Wing	Red Wing, MN
G	3	Frankie Wurtz	5 ft 8 in (1.73 m)	Fr	Kimberly	Kimberly, WI
G	4	Kaili Lukan	5 ft 10 in (1.78 m)	So	Barrie Central	Barrie, ON
G	5	Laken James	5 ft 9 in (1.75 m)	RS Fr	Oconto	Oconto, WI
F	10	Mehryn Kraker	6 ft 0 in (1.83 m)	RS Jr	West Allis Central	West Allis, WI
F	11	Ashley Luke	6 ft 0 in (1.83 m)	Sr	Oak Creek	Oak Creek, WI
G/F	21	Jessica Lindstrom	6 ft 1 in (1.85 m)	So	Superior	Superior, WI
G	24	Allie LeClaire	5 ft 10 in (1.78 m)	So	Notre Dame Academy	Green Bay, WI
C	33	Lexi Weitzer	6 ft 3 in (1.91 m)	Jr	Waukesha South	Waukesha, WI
F/C	42	Mackenzie Wolf	6 ft 4 in (1.93 m)	Fr	Sheboygan North	Kohler, WI
F	44	Mariah Monke	6 ft 2 in (1.88 m)	RS Jr	Fergus Falls	Fergus Falls, MN
F/C	52	Madison Wolf	6 ft 3 in (1.91 m)	Fr	Sheboygan North	Kohler, WI
G/F	55	Sam Terry	6 ft 0 in (1.83 m)	Jr	Baraboo	Baraboo, WI

Head coach

- Kevin Borseth (Lake Superior State)

Assistant coach(es)

- Amanda Leonhard-Perry (Green Bay)
- Sarah Bronk (St. Thomas (MN))
- Megan Vogel (South Dakota State)

Legend

- (C) Team captain
- (S) Suspended
- (I) Ineligible
- (W) Walk-on
- Injured
- Current redshirt

Roster

== Schedule ==
Date time, TV	Rank^{#}	Opponent^{#}	Result	Record	Site (attendance) city, state
Exhibition
10/31/2015*; 4:00 pm		Minnesota–Duluth	W 80–25		Kress Events Center (1,861); Green Bay, WI
11/05/2015*; 7:00 pm		St. Norbert	W 75–38		Kress Events Center (1,928); Green Bay, WI
Non-conference regular season
11/15/2015*; 7:00 pm, ESPN3		Marquette	W 75–55	1–0	Kress Events Center (3,323); Green Bay, WI
11/21/2015*; 1:00 pm, TWCSC/ESPN3		Vanderbilt	W 58–56	2–0	Kress Events Center (2,351); Green Bay, WI
11/26/2015*; 12:00 pm		vs. Virginia; Paradise Jam tournament Island Division	L 59–68	2–1	Sports and Fitness Center; Saint Thomas, USVI
11/27/2015*; 11:00 am		vs. Tulane; Paradise Jam Tournament Island Division	W 79–58	3–1	Sports and Fitness Center; Saint Thomas, USVI
11/28/2015*; 2:15 pm		vs. Rutgers; Paradise Jam Tournament Island Division	L 43–54	3–2	Sports and Fitness Center; Saint Thomas, USVI
12/06/2015*; 2:00 pm, ESPN3		at Drake	W 86–61	4–2	Knapp Center (2,294); Des Moines, IA
12/09/2015*; 6:00 pm		at Butler	W 55–46	5–2	Hinkle Fieldhouse (346); Indianapolis, IN
12/13/2015*; 2:00 pm		at Wisconsin	W 72–58	6–2	Kohl Center (5,688); Madison, WI
12/16/2015*; 7:00 pm, ESPN3		Loyola–Chicago	W 65–51	7–2	Kress Events Center (1,960); Green Bay, WI
12/19/2015*; 5:00 pm, ESPN3		South Dakota State	W 58–57	8–2	Kress Events Center (2,527); Green Bay, WI
12/22/2015*; 6:00 pm, ESPN3		Belmont	W 66–62	9–2	Kress Events Center (2,113); Green Bay, WI
12/30/2015*; 7:00 pm, ESPN3		Dayton	W 68–52	10–2	Kress Events Center (2,533); Green Bay, WI
Horizon League regular season
01/01/2016; 2:00 pm, ESPN3		at Milwaukee	W 63–42	11–2 (1–0)	Klotsche Center (1,364); Milwaukee, WI
01/07/2016; 4:30 pm, ESPN3		at Cleveland State	W 66–45	12–2 (2–0)	Wolstein Center (603); Cleveland, OH
01/09/2016; 3:30 pm, ESPN3		at Youngstown State	W 68–60	13–2 (3–0)	Beeghly Center (2,553); Youngstown, OH
01/14/2016; 7:00 pm, ESPN3		Valparaiso	W 81–42	14–2 (4–0)	Kress Events Center (1,994); Green Bay, WI
01/16/2016; 1:00 pm, TWCSC/ESPN3		UIC	W 64–22	15–2 (5–0)	Kress Events Center (2,393); Green Bay, WI
01/21/2016; 6:00 pm, ESPN3		at Northern Kentucky	W 81–73	16–2 (6–0)	BB&T Arena (1,418); Highland Heights, KY
01/23/2016; 1:00 pm, ESPN3		at Wright State	W 63–58	17–2 (7–0)	Nutter Center (908); Dayton, OH
01/28/2016; 7:00 pm, ESPN3		Oakland	L 56–58	17–3 (7–1)	Kress Events Center (2,083); Green Bay, WI
01/30/2016; 7:00 pm, ESPN3		Detroit	W 58–36	18–3 (8–1)	Kress Events Center (2,460); Green Bay, WI
02/06/2016; 2:00 pm, TWCSC/ESPN3		Milwaukee	W 69–46	19–3 (9–1)	Kress Events Center (3,197); Green Bay, WI
02/11/2016; 7:00 pm, ESPN3		Youngstown State	W 69–35	20–3 (10–1)	Kress Events Center (2,326); Green Bay, WI
02/13/2016; 1:00 pm, ESPN3		Cleveland State	W 71–53	21–3 (11–1)	Kress Events Center (2,901); Green Bay, WI
02/18/2016; 7:00 pm, ESPN3		at UIC	W 58–40	22–3 (12–1)	UIC Pavilion (684); Chicago, IL
02/20/2016; 7:00 pm, ESPN3		at Valparaiso	W 71–35	23–3 (13–1)	Athletics–Recreation Center (581); Valparaiso, IN
02/25/2016; 7:00 pm, TWCSC/ESPN3		Wright State	W 70–55	24–3 (14–1)	Kress Events Center (2,326); Green Bay, WI
02/27/2016; 1:00 pm, ESPN3		Northern Kentucky	W 52–40	25–3 (15–1)	Kress Events Center (3,107); Green Bay, WI
03/03/2016; 6:00 pm, ESPN3		at Detroit	W 74–58	26–3 (16–1)	Calihan Hall (237); Detroit, MI
03/05/2016; 2:00 pm, ESPN3		at Oakland	L 69–77	26–4 (16–2)	Athletics Center O'rena (703); Rochester, MI
Horizon League Women's tournament
03/12/2016; 3:00 pm, ESPN3		Northern Kentucky; Semifinals	W 80–78 ^{2OT}	27–4	Kress Events Center; Green Bay, WI
03/13/2016; 12:00 pm, ESPNU		Milwaukee; Championship Game	W 64–32	28–4	Kress Events Center (2,141); Green Bay, WI
NCAA Women's tournament
03/18/2016*; 4:00 pm, ESPN2	(10 SF)	vs. (7 SF) Tennessee; First Round	L 53–59	28–5	Wells Fargo Arena (2,842); Tempe, AZ
*Non-conference game. ^{#}Rankings from AP Poll. (#) Tournament seedings in parentheses. SF=Sioux Falls Region. All times are in Central Time.

== Rankings ==
Ranking movement Legend: ██ Increase in ranking. ██ Decrease in ranking. NR = Not ranked. RV = Received votes.
Poll	Pre	Wk 2	Wk 3	Wk 4	Wk 5	Wk 6	Wk 7	Wk 8	Wk 9	Wk 10	Wk 11	Wk 12	Wk 13	Wk 14	Wk 15	Wk 16	Wk 17	Wk 18	Wk 19	Final
AP	NR	RV	NR	NR	NR	NR	NR	NR	RV	RV	RV	RV	RV	RV	RV	RV	RV	NR	NR	N/A
Coaches	NR	RV	NR	NR	NR	NR	NR	NR	NR	RV	RV	22	RV	RV	RV	RV	RV	RV	RV	NR

== See also ==
2015–16 Green Bay Phoenix men's basketball team
