= Maren Westin =

American basketball player (born 2005)

No. 4 – Green Bay Phoenix
- Position: Point guard
- League: Horizon League

Career information
- High school: Becker; Becker, Minnesota
- College: Green Bay (2023–present)

Career highlights
- 3-Time Horizon League Champion (2024, 2025, 2026); Minnesota Class AAA State Champion (2021); 2-time Minnesota Class AAA All-State selection (2021, 2022); Jim Robinson Outstanding Player Award (2022)

Maren Westin is an American college basketball player, who currently plays as a point guard for the Green Bay Phoenix of the Horizon League. As of June 2026, Westin is Green Bay's longest tenured player alongside Meghan Schultz and Sophie Lahti as the final recruiting class of head coach Kevin Borseth. Westin suffered a career altering knee injury that sidelined her for 407 days, before returning her third season and appearing in her second NCAA March Madness tournament game in her home state of Minnesota. Westin was a member of three consecutive Horizon League Championship teams for Green Bay that advanced to the NCAA women's basketball tournament in 2024, in 2025, and in 2026.

== College career ==
On September 12, 2021, Maren Westin announced her commitment to play Division 1 basketball for the University of Wisconsin-Green Bay. On November 9, 2022, Westin was officially announced as a recruit by Kevin Borseth for the Green Bay women’s basketball program.

Westin debuted for the Green Bay Phoenix during the 2023–24 season, appearing in 31 games as a true freshman. She established herself as an efficient reserve guard, shooting 51.2% from the field and 39.1% from three-point range.

Her 2024–25 sophomore season was cut short after 11 games due to a season-ending torn ACL suffered in practice in December 2024.

After a 407-day rehabilitation process, and undergoing a successful anterior cruciate ligament reconstruction surgery, Westin returned to the court on January 22, 2026, against Oakland. Westin received praise from head coach Kayla Karius for her rehab to overcome the injury.

== High school ==
Despite playing for Becker High School’s basketball team and the Minnesota Comets AAU team, Westin was homeschooled her entire life.

Although the 2020 tournament was canceled mid-play due to the COVID-19 pandemic, Westin led Becker to state runner-ups in both 2022 and 2023. Individually, Westin was a two-time Minnesota Class AAA All-State selection (2021, 2022) and was named to the MSHSL State All-Tournament Team for her postseason performances.

Westin is a three-time All-Conference honoree, a 3A all-star selection, and was a top-10 prospect in the state of Minnesota for the Class of 2023 by scouting services such as Prep Girls Hoops. On January 17, 2023, Westin surpassed 1,000 career points in Becker's 75-30 win over North Branch High School, where Westin scored 14 points.

=== Injuries ===
During her senior season, Maren was sidelined for six games during the regular season with an injury where she had to undergo surgery to remove a cyst.
