= 2018–19 Green Bay Phoenix women's basketball team =

Intercollegiate basketball season

2018–19 Green Bay Phoenix women's basketball

WNIT, first round
- Conference: Horizon League
- Record: 22–10 (15–3 Horizon)
- Head coach: Kevin Borseth (16th season)
- Assistant coaches: Amanda Leonhard-Perry; Sarah Bronk; Megan Vogel
- Home arena: Kress Events Center

2018–19 Horizon League women's basketball standings
	Conf.				Overall
Team	W		L	PCT	W		L	PCT
Wright State†	16	–	2	.889	27	–	7	.794
Green Bay	15	–	3	.833	22	–	10	.688
Youngstown State	13	–	5	.722	22	–	10	.688
IUPUI	13	–	5	.722	20	–	12	.625
Milwaukee	10	–	8	.556	15	–	15	.500
Northern Kentucky	10	–	8	.556	11	–	18	.379
Cleveland State	7	–	11	.389	10	–	19	.345
Oakland	3	–	15	.167	6	–	24	.200
Detroit Mercy	2	–	16	.111	4	–	25	.138
UIC	1	–	17	.056	3	–	26	.103
† 2019 Horizon League tournament winner Rankings from AP poll

The 2018–19 Green Bay Phoenix women's basketball team represented the University of Wisconsin–Green Bay in the 2018–19 NCAA Division I women's basketball season. The Phoenix, led by head coach Kevin Borseth in the seventh year of his current stint and 16th year overall at the school, played their home games at the Kress Events Center in Green Bay, Wisconsin and were members of the Horizon League. It was the 40th season of Green Bay women's basketball. They finished the season 22–10, 15–3 in Horizon play, to finish in second place. They advanced to the championship game of the Horizon League women's basketball tournament where they lost to Wright State. They received an automatic bid to the WNIT where they lost to Kent State in the first round.

== Roster ==
2018–19 Green Bay Phoenix women's basketball team
Players
Coaches

Pos.	#	Name	Height	Year	Previous school	Hometown
G	0	Hailey Oskey	5 ft 10 in (1.78 m)	Fr	Seymour	Seymour, WI
G	1	Jen Wellnitz	5 ft 8 in (1.73 m)	RS Sr	Black Hawk	South Wayne, WI
G	3	Frankie Wurtz	5 ft 8 in (1.73 m)	Jr	Kimberly	Kimberly, WI
G	4	Caitlyn Hibner	6 ft 0 in (1.83 m)	Jr	Portage	Portage, WI
G	5	Laken James	5 ft 9 in (1.75 m)	RS Sr	Oconto	Oconto, WI
G	10	Anna Brecht	6 ft 0 in (1.83 m)	RS Fr	Lincoln	Sioux Falls, SD
G	11	Patricia Gallasova	5 ft 9 in (1.75 m)	Fr		Prague, Czech Republic
G	14	Meghan Pingel	5 ft 8 in (1.73 m)	RS So	Lakeside Lutheran	Sun Prairie, WI
G/F	25	Lyndsey Robson	6 ft 0 in (1.83 m)	So	Apple Valley	Burnsville, MN
F	32	Karly Murphy	6 ft 1 in (1.85 m)	RS So	River Falls	River Falls, WI
F	34	Carly Mohns	6 ft 1 in (1.85 m)	RS Sr	Brodhead; Iowa	Brodhead, WI
F/C	42	Mackenzie Wolf	6 ft 4 in (1.93 m)	RS Jr	Sheboygan North	Kohler, WI
F	44	Anna Dier	6 ft 0 in (1.83 m)	Jr	Algoma	Algoma, WI
F/C	52	Madison Wolf	6 ft 3 in (1.91 m)	RS Jr	Sheboygan North	Kohler, WI

Head coach

- Kevin Borseth (Lake Superior State)

Assistant coach(es)

- Amanda Leonhard-Perry (Green Bay)
- Sarah Bronk (St. Thomas (MN))
- Megan Vogel (South Dakota State)

Legend

- (C) Team captain
- (S) Suspended
- (I) Ineligible
- (W) Walk-on
- Injured
- Current redshirt

Roster
Last update: May 29, 2025

== Schedule ==
Date time, TV	Rank^{#}	Opponent^{#}	Result	Record	Site (attendance) city, state
Exhibition
October 24, 2018*; 7:00 p.m.		UW–Stevens Point	W 94–40		Kress Events Center (1,269); Green Bay, WI
October 30, 2018*; 7:00 p.m.		UW–Eau Claire	W 82–27		Kress Events Center (1,192); Green Bay, WI
Non-conference regular season
November 6, 2018*; 7:00 p.m., ESPN+		Northwestern	L 55–57	0–1	Kress Events Center (1,662); Green Bay, WI
November 9, 2018*; 7:00 p.m.		at No. 15 DePaul	L 64–73	0–2	McGrath-Phillips Arena (1,571); Chicago, IL
November 16, 2018*; 6:00 p.m., SECN		at No. 16 Missouri	W 56–49	1–2	Mizzou Arena (3,687); Columbia, MO
November 20, 2018*; 7:00 p.m., ESPN+		Maine	W 70–39	2–2	Kress Events Center (1,280); Green Bay, WI
November 24, 2018*; 1:00 p.m., ESPN+		Dayton	W 51–35	3–2	Kress Events Center (1,560); Green Bay, WI
November 29, 2018*; 7:00 p.m., ESPN+		at South Dakota State	L 47–77	3–3	Frost Arena (1,782); Brookings, SD
December 1, 2018*; 1:00 p.m., ESPN3		at South Dakota	L 49–55	3–4	Sanford Coyote Sports Center (1,960); Vermillion, SD
December 8, 2018*; 1:00 p.m., ESPN+		Wisconsin	W 55–46	4–4	Kress Events Center (3,530); Green Bay, WI
December 15, 2018*; 2:00 p.m.		at No. 19 Marquette	L 54–80	4–5	Al McGuire Center (1,801); Milwaukee, WI
December 18, 2018*; 7:00 p.m., ESPN3		UW–Parkside	W 81–32	5–5	Kress Events Center (1,485); Green Bay, WI
Horizon League regular season
December 28, 2018; 7:00 p.m., ESPN3		at Milwaukee	W 76–62	6–5 (1–0)	Klotsche Center (1,113); Milwaukee, WI
January 3, 2019; 6:00 p.m., ESPN+		at Wright State	L 67–85	6–6 (1–1)	Nutter Center (323); Fairborn, OH
January 5, 2019; 1:00 p.m., ESPN3		at Northern Kentucky	W 81–61	7–6 (2–1)	BB&T Arena (1,288); Highland Heights, KY
January 10, 2019; 7:00 p.m., ESPN+		Cleveland State	W 62–53	8–6 (3–1)	Kress Events Center (1,723); Green Bay, WI
January 12, 2019; 1:00 p.m., ESPN+		Youngstown State	W 60–42	9–6 (4–1)	Kress Events Center (2,315); Green Bay, WI
January 18, 2019; 6:00 p.m., ESPN3		at Detroit Mercy	W 65–40	10–6 (5–1)	Calihan Hall (406); Detroit, MI
January 20, 2019; 2:00 p.m., ESPN+		at Oakland	W 77–53	11–6 (6–1)	Athletics Center O'rena (768); Auburn Hills, MI
January 24, 2019; 7:00 p.m., ESPN+		UIC	W 62–32	12–6 (7–1)	Kress Events Center (1,356); Green Bay, WI
January 26, 2019; 1:00 p.m., ESPN+		IUPUI	L 63–67 ^{OT}	12–7 (7–2)	Kress Events Center (2,252); Green Bay, WI
February 2, 2019; 1:00 p.m., ESPN3		Milwaukee	W 59–45	13–7 (8–2)	Kress Events Center (2,540); Green Bay, WI
February 7, 2019; 7:00 p.m., ESPN+		Northern Kentucky	W 70–42	14–7 (9–2)	Kress Events Center (1,889); Green Bay, WI
February 9, 2019; 1:00 p.m., ESPN3		Wright State	W 56–37	15–7 (10–2)	Kress Events Center (2,452); Green Bay, WI
February 15, 2019; 6:00 p.m., ESPN+		at Youngstown State	L 59–70	15–8 (10–3)	Beeghly Center (1,663); Youngstown, OH
February 17, 2019; 12:00 p.m., ESPN+		at Cleveland State	W 81–61	16–8 (11–3)	Wolstein Center (216); Cleveland, OH
February 21, 2019; 7:00 p.m., ESPN3		Oakland	W 72–32	17–8 (12–3)	Kress Events Center (2,172); Green Bay, WI
February 23, 2019; 1:00 p.m., ESPN3		Detroit Mercy	W 82–37	18–8 (13–3)	Kress Events Center (2,486); Green Bay, WI
February 28, 2019; 6:00 p.m., ESPN+		at IUPUI	W 45–43	19–8 (14–3)	The Jungle (511); Indianapolis, IN
March 2, 2019; 12:00 p.m., ESPN+		at UIC	W 77–53	20–8 (15–3)	Credit Union 1 Arena (312); Chicago, IL
Horizon League women's tournament
March 6, 2019; 7:00 p.m., ESPN+	(2)	(7) Cleveland State; Quarterfinals	W 73–30	21–8	Kress Events Center (1,920); Green Bay, WI
March 11, 2019; 2:00 p.m., ESPN+	(2)	vs. (3) Youngstown State; Semifinals	W 55–53	22–8	Little Caesars Arena; Detroit, MI
March 12, 2019; 11:00 a.m., ESPNU	(2)	vs. (1) Wright State; Championship	L 52–55	22–9	Little Caesars Arena; Detroit, MI
WNIT
March 21, 2019*; 6:00 p.m.		Kent State; First round	L 59–64	22–10	Kress Events Center (1,269); Green Bay, WI
*Non-conference game. ^{#}Rankings from AP poll. (#) Tournament seedings in parentheses. All times are in Central.

== Rankings ==
Ranking movement Legend: ██ Increase in ranking. ██ Decrease in ranking. NR = Not ranked. RV = Received votes
Poll	Pre	Wk 2	Wk 3	Wk 4	Wk 5	Wk 6	Wk 7	Wk 8	Wk 9	Wk 10	Wk 11	Wk 12	Wk 13	Wk 14	Wk 15	Wk 16	Wk 17	Wk 18	Wk 19	Final
AP																				N/A
Coaches																				
