= 2018–19 Wright State Raiders women's basketball team =

American college basketball season

2018–19 Wright State Raiders women's basketball

Horizon regular season champions Horizon women's tournament champions

NCAA tournament, first round
- Conference: Horizon League
- Record: 27–7 (16–2 Horizon)
- Head coach: Katrina Merriweather (3rd season)
- Assistant coaches: Tennille Adams; Ashley Barlow; Abby Jump
- Home arena: Nutter Center

2018–19 Horizon League women's basketball standings
	Conf.				Overall
Team	W		L	PCT	W		L	PCT
Wright State†	16	–	2	.889	27	–	7	.794
Green Bay	15	–	3	.833	22	–	10	.688
Youngstown State	13	–	5	.722	22	–	10	.688
IUPUI	13	–	5	.722	20	–	12	.625
Milwaukee	10	–	8	.556	15	–	15	.500
Northern Kentucky	10	–	8	.556	11	–	18	.379
Cleveland State	7	–	11	.389	10	–	19	.345
Oakland	3	–	15	.167	6	–	24	.200
Detroit Mercy	2	–	16	.111	4	–	25	.138
UIC	1	–	17	.056	3	–	26	.103
† 2019 Horizon League tournament winner Rankings from AP poll

The 2018–19 Wright State Raiders women's basketball team represented Wright State University during the 2018–19 NCAA Division I women's basketball season. The Raiders, led by third-year head coach Katrina Merriweather, played their home games at the Nutter Center in Fairborn, Ohio, as members of the Horizon League. They finished the season 27–7, 16–2 in Horizon League play to win the Horizon regular season title. They won the Horizon women's tournament and earned an automatic place in the NCAA women's tournament for the first time since 2014, where they lost to Texas A&M in the first round.

== Roster ==
2018–19 Wright State Raiders women's basketball team
Players
Coaches

Pos.	#	Name	Height	Year	Previous school	Hometown
F	0	Nia Sumpter	5 ft 11 in (1.8 m)	So	Myrtle Beach	Myrtle Beach, SC
F	1	Alexis Stover (redshirt)	5 ft 11 in (1.8 m)	So	Solon; Ohio	Solon, OH
G	3	Emily Vogelpohl	5 ft 8 in (1.73 m)	Sr	McAuley	Cincinnati, OH
G	5	Anisja Harris	5 ft 9 in (1.75 m)	Fr	Lincoln	Gahanna, OH
F	10	Shamarre Hale	6 ft 2 in (1.88 m)	Fr	Crete-Monee	Crete, IL
G	11	Jalise Beck	5 ft 8 in (1.73 m)	Jr	Arsenal Tech	Indianapolis, IN
G	12	Mackenzie Taylor	5 ft 6 in (1.68 m)	Sr	Richmond	Richmond, IN
G	15	Angel Baker	5 ft 8 in (1.73 m)	Fr	Pike	Indianapolis, IN
F	21	Dasia Evans	6 ft 2 in (1.88 m)	RS So	Rich South	Indianapolis, IN
F	22	Teneshia Dixon	6 ft 1 in (1.85 m)	Jr	Half Century Club; Midland College	Brampton, ON
G	23	Symone Simmons	5 ft 10 in (1.78 m)	Sr	Michigan City; Trinity Valley CC	Columbus, OH
C	33	Tyler Frierson	6 ft 4 in (1.93 m)	So	Millikan	Long Beach, CA
F	45	Imani Partlow	6 ft 1 in (1.85 m)	RS Sr	Winton Woods; Xavier	Cincinnati, OH

Head coach

- Katrina Merriweather (Cincinnati)

Assistant coach(es)

- Tennille Adams (Arkansas)
- Ashley Barlow (Notre Dame)
- Abby Jump (Wright State)

Legend

- (C) Team captain
- (S) Suspended
- (I) Ineligible
- (W) Walk-on
- Injured
- Current redshirt

Roster
Last update: March 13, 2018

== Schedule and results ==
Date time, TV	Rank^{#}	Opponent^{#}	Result	Record	Site (attendance) city, state
Exhibition
Oct 27, 2018*; 2:00 pm		Marian	W 86–46		Nutter Center; Fairborn, OH
Non-conference regular season
Nov 6, 2018*; 10:00 pm, ESPN3		at Cal State Bakersfield	L 74–76	0–1	Icardo Center (720); Bakersfield, CA
Nov 9, 2018*; 9:00 pm		at UNLV	W 68–52	1–1	Cox Pavilion (1,121); Paradise, NV
Nov 15, 2018*; 7:00 pm, ESPN+		Belmont	L 63–79	1–2	Nutter Center (342); Fairborn, OH
Nov 18, 2018*; 1:00 pm		at Michigan State	L 68–84	1–3	Breslin Center (5,233); East Lansing, MI
Nov 23, 2018*; 3:30 pm		vs. Hofstra; Challenge in Music City Broadwalk Bracket	W 94–63	2–3	Nashville Municipal Auditorium (750); Nashville, TN
Nov 24, 2018*; 1:00 pm		vs. Stetson; Challenge in Music City Broadwalk Bracket	W 57–44	3–3	Nashville Municipal Auditorium; Nashville, TN
Nov 25, 2018*; 3:30 pm		vs. Marist; Challenge in Music City Broadwalk Bracket	W 76–60	4–3	Nashville Municipal Auditorium; Nashville, TN
Nov 28, 2018*; 7:00 pm, ESPN+		Kent State	W 61–55	5–3	Nutter Center (343); Fairborn, OH
Dec 8, 2018*; 3:30 pm		vs. Drexel; Manhattan Classic	W 71–63 ^{OT}	6–3	Draddy Gymnasium (115); Riverdale, NY
Dec 9, 2018*; 2:00 pm		at Manhattan; Manhattan Classic	W 60–44	7–3	Draddy Gymnasium (123); Riverdale, NY
Dec 13, 2018*; 11:00 am, ESPN+		Kentucky State	W 83–53	8–3	Nutter Center (1,110); Fairborn, OH
Dec 18, 2018*; 11:30 am		at Charlotte	L 85–88 ^{OT}	8–4	Dale F. Halton Arena (8,249); Charlotte, NC
Horizon League regular season
Dec 28, 2018; 7:00 pm, ESPN+		at IUPUI	W 78–75 ^{OT}	9–4 (1–0)	The Jungle (416); Indianapolis, IN
Dec 30, 2018; 1:00 pm, ESPN3		at UIC	W 79–46	10–4 (2–0)	Credit Union 1 Arena (267); Chicago, IL
Jan 3, 2019; 7:00 pm, ESPN+		Green Bay	W 85–67	11–4 (3–0)	Nutter Center (323); Fairborn, OH
Jan 5, 2019; 2:00 pm, ESPN3		Milwaukee	W 61–57	12–4 (4–0)	Nutter Center (289); Fairborn, OH
Jan 12, 2019; 2:00 pm, ESPN3		at Northern Kentucky	W 61–55	13–4 (5–0)	BB&T Arena (1,294); Highland Heights, KY
Jan 18, 2019; 7:00 pm, ESPN+		at Youngstown State	L 68–83	13–5 (5–1)	Beeghly Center (1,359); Youngstown, OH
Jan 20, 2019; 3:00 pm, ESPN+		at Cleveland State	W 70–65	14–5 (6–1)	Wolstein Center (217); Cleveland, OH
Jan 25, 2019; 7:00 pm, ESPN+		Oakland	W 69–58	15–5 (7–1)	Nutter Center (309); Fairborn, OH
Jan 27, 2019; 2:00 pm, ESPN+		Detroit Mercy	W 78–59	16–5 (8–1)	Nutter Center (336); Fairborn, OH
Jan 31, 2019; 7:00 pm, ESPN3		UIC	W 72–47	17–5 (9–1)	Nutter Center (217); Fairborn, OH
Feb 2, 2019; 2:00 pm, ESPN3		IUPUI	W 66–59	18–5 (10–1)	Nutter Center (642); Fairborn, OH
Feb 7, 2019; 8:00 pm, ESPN+		at Milwaukee	W 73–69	19–5 (11–1)	Klotsche Center (505); Milwaukee, WI
Feb 9, 2019; 2:00 pm, ESPN3		at Green Bay	L 37–56	19–6 (11–2)	Kress Events Center (2,452); Green Bay, WI
Feb 16, 2019; 2:00 pm, ESPN3		Northern Kentucky	W 78–56	20–6 (12–2)	Nutter Center (287); Fairborn, OH
Feb 22, 2019; 7:00 pm, ESPN+		Cleveland State	W 78–52	21–6 (13–2)	Nutter Center (322); Fairborn, OH
Jan 24, 2019; 2:00 pm, ESPN3		Youngstown State	W 70–65	22–6 (14–2)	Nutter Center (673); Fairborn, OH
Feb 28, 2019; 5:00 pm, ESPN+		at Detroit Mercy	W 76–73	23–6 (15–2)	Calihan Hall (286); Detroit, MI
Mar 2, 2019; 12:00 pm, ESPN3		at Oakland	W 73–64	24–6 (16–2)	Athletics Center O'rena (726); Auburn Hills, MI
Horizon League Women's Tournament
Mar 5, 2019; 5:30 pm, ESPN+	(1)	(8) Oakland; Quarterfinals	W 83–60	25–6	Nutter Center (1,145); Fairborn, OH
Mar 11, 2019; 1:00 pm, ESPN+	(1)	vs. (4) IUPUI; Semifinals	W 60–51	26–6	Little Caesars Arena; Detroit, MI
Mar 12, 2019; 12:00 pm, ESPNU	(1)	vs. (2) Green Bay; Championship Game	W 55–52	27–6	Little Caesars Arena; Detroit, MI
NCAA Women's Tournament
Mar 22, 2019*; 4:30 pm, ESPN2	(13 G)	at (4 G) No. 14 Texas A&M; First Round	L 61–84	27–7	Reed Arena (2,617); College Station, TX
*Non-conference game. ^{#}Rankings from AP Poll. (#) Tournament seedings in parentheses. C=Chicago Region. All times are in Eastern Time.

== See also ==
- 2018–19 Wright State Raiders men's basketball team
