= 2018–19 Belmont Bruins women's basketball team =

Intercollegiate basketball season

2018–19 Belmont Bruins women's basketball

OVC regular-season and tournament champions

NCAA Women's Tournament, first round
- Conference: Ohio Valley Conference
- Record: 26–7 (16–2 OVC)
- Head coach: Bart Brooks (2nd season)
- Assistant coaches: Jamey Givens; Amy Malo; Karmen Graham
- Home arena: Curb Event Center

2018–19 Ohio Valley Conference women's basketball standings
	Conf.				Overall
Team	W		L	PCT	W		L	PCT
Belmont †	16	–	2	.889	26	–	7	.788
UT Martin	13	–	5	.722	23	–	9	.719
Morehead State	13	–	5	.722	24	–	11	.686
Tennessee Tech	12	–	6	.667	22	–	11	.667
Austin Peay	10	–	8	.556	15	–	15	.500
Jacksonville State	9	–	9	.500	15	–	15	.500
Murray State	9	–	9	.500	13	–	17	.433
SIU Edwardsville	8	–	10	.444	13	–	16	.448
Southeast Missouri State	8	–	10	.444	13	–	17	.433
Eastern Illinois	5	–	13	.278	11	–	18	.379
Tennessee State	5	–	13	.278	5	–	25	.167
Eastern Kentucky	0	–	18	.000	2	–	27	.069
† 2019 OVC tournament winner Rankings from AP poll

The 2018–19 Belmont Bruins women's basketball team represented Belmont University during the 2018–19 NCAA Division I women's basketball season. The Bruins, led by second-year head coach Bart Brooks, played their home games at the Curb Event Center as members of the Ohio Valley Conference (OVC). They finished the season 26–7, 16–2 in OVC play, to win the OVC regular season. They won the OVC women's tournament by defeating UT Martin, and earned an automatic trip to the NCAA women's tournament, where they lost to South Carolina in the first round.

== Roster ==
2018–19 Belmont Bruins women's basketball team
Players
Coaches

Pos.	#	Name	Height	Year	Previous school	Hometown
F	1	Madison Treece (redshirt)	6 ft 4 in (1.93 m)	So	Rock Bridge; Duke	St. Peters, MO
G	4	Macie Culbertson	5 ft 11 in (1.8 m)	Fr	Daniel Boone	Fall Branch, TN
F	10	Allison Luly	6 ft 1 in (1.85 m)	RS Fr	Creekview	Alpharetta, GA
G	14	Jamilyn Kinney	5 ft 7 in (1.7 m)	Fr	Van Buren	Van Buren, AR
F	20	Conley Chinn	6 ft 1 in (1.85 m)	RS Fr	Jackson Academy	Jackson, MS
G	21	Paris Lawson	5 ft 9 in (1.75 m)	Jr	Oakland	Murfreesboro, TN
G	22	Maddie Cook	5 ft 10 in (1.78 m)	RS Fr	Oakland	Murfreesboro, Tennessee
G	24	Jenny Roy	5 ft 11 in (1.8 m)	Sr	Brentwood	Brentwood, Tennessee
G	25	Grace Smith	5 ft 9 in (1.75 m)	RS Fr	Cary Christian School	Raleigh, NC
F	30	Ellie Harmeyer	6 ft 0 in (1.83 m)	RS Jr	Shoreland Lutheran	Kenosha, WI
G	31	Maura Muensterman	6 ft 0 in (1.83 m)	RS Jr	Mater Dei; Indiana	Evansville, IN
G	33	Darby Maggard	5 ft 5 in (1.65 m)	Sr	Fort Wayne Canterbury	Larwill, IN
G	34	Hannah Harmeyer	5 ft 8 in (1.73 m)	RS Sr	Shoreland Lutheran; Wisconsin Lutheran	Kenosha, WI
F	55	Maddie Wright	6 ft 1 in (1.85 m)	Jr	Boyd-Buchanan	Chattanooga, TN

Head coach

- Bart Brooks (Wyoming)

Assistant coach(es)

- Jamey Givens (Florida State)
- Amy Malo (Vanderbilt)
- Christine Clark (Harvard)

Legend

- (C) Team captain
- (S) Suspended
- (I) Ineligible
- (W) Walk-on
- Injured
- Current redshirt

Roster
Last update: July 4, 2023

== Schedule and results ==
Date time, TV	Rank^{#}	Opponent^{#}	Result	Record	Site (attendance) city, state
Non-conference regular season
November 7, 2018*; 6:00 p.m., ACCN		at No. 17 NC State	L 62–77	0–1	Reynolds Coliseum (1,945); Raleigh, NC
November 12, 2018*; 5:00 p.m., ESPN+		Tulsa	W 78–53	1–1	Curb Event Center (619); Nashville, TN
November 15, 2018*; 6:00 p.m., ESPN+		at Wright State	W 79–63	2–1	Nutter Center (342); Fairborn, OH
November 19, 2018*; 6:30 p.m.		at Middle Tennessee	W 45–38	3–1	Murphy Center (3,625); Murfreesboro, TN
November 21, 2018*; 5:00 p.m., ESPN+		at Northern Kentucky	W 71–53	4–1	BB&T Arena (1,052); Highland Heights, KY
November 28, 2018*; 11:00 a.m., ESPN+		Toledo	L 69–78	4–2	Curb Event Center (2,461); Nashville, TN
December 2, 2018*; 1:00 p.m., ACCNE		at Clemson	L 62–65	4–3	Littlejohn Coliseum (561); Clemson, SC
December 4, 2018*; 5:00 p.m., ESPN+		Lipscomb; Battle of the Boulevard	W 83–43	5–3	Curb Event Center (1,341); Nashville, TN
December 17, 2018*; 6:00 p.m., ESPN3		at Chattanooga	W 67–51	6–3	McKenzie Arena (1,367); Chattanooga, TN
December 21, 2018*; 12:00 p.m., ESPN+		Arkansas State	W 74–55	7–3	Curb Event Center (578); Nashville, TN
December 30, 2018*; 1:00 p.m.		at No. 10 Tennessee	L 76–84	7–4	Thompson–Boling Arena (8,546); Knoxville, TN
Ohio Valley Conference regular season
January 3, 2019; 5:00 p.m., ESPN+		Jacksonville State	W 66–52	8–4 (1–0)	Curb Event Center (1,197); Nashville, TN
January 5, 2019; 3:00 p.m., ESPN+		Tennessee Tech	L 72–77	8–5 (1–1)	Curb Event Center (1,894); Nashville, TN
January 10, 2019; 4:00 p.m., ESPNU		Morehead State	W 77–50	9–5 (2–1)	Curb Event Center (802); Nashville, TN
January 12, 2019; 3:00 p.m., ESPN+		Eastern Kentucky	W 69–43	10–5 (3–1)	Curb Event Center (1,252); Nashville, TN
January 17, 2019; 5:15 p.m., ESPN+		at Jacksonville State	W 64–41	11–5 (4–1)	Pete Mathews Coliseum (1,022); Jacksonville, AL
January 19, 2019; 3:00 p.m., ESPN+		Tennessee State	W 80–46	12–5 (5–1)	Curb Event Center (1,521); Nashville, TN
January 24, 2019; 5:00 p.m., ESPN+		at Murray State	W 65–58	13–5 (6–1)	CFSB Center (3,071); Murray, KY
January 26, 2019; 1:30 p.m., ESPN+		at Austin Peay	W 80–62	14–5 (7–1)	Dunn Center (596); Clarksville, TN
January 31, 2019; 5:00 p.m., ESPN+		Southeast Missouri State	W 91–57	15–5 (8–1)	Curb Event Center (1,043); Nashville, TN
February 2, 2019; 3:00 p.m., ESPN+		UT Martin	W 100–86	16–5 (9–1)	Curb Event Center (1,478); Nashville, TN
February 7, 2019; 4:00 p.m., ESPN+		at Eastern Kentucky	W 87–52	17–5 (10–1)	McBrayer Arena (250); Richmond, KY
February 9, 2019; 1:05 p.m., ESPN+		at Morehead State	W 77–57	18–5 (11–1)	Ellis Johnson Arena (1,305); Morehead, KY
February 13, 2019; 11:00 a.m., ESPN+		at Tennessee State	W 89–65	19–5 (12–1)	Gentry Complex (3,843); Nashville, TN
February 16, 2019; 5:30 p.m., ESPN+		at Tennessee Tech	W 99–67	20–5 (13–1)	Eblen Center (2,452); Cookeville, TN
February 21, 2019; 5:00 p.m., ESPN+		Eastern Illinois	W 98–57	21–5 (14–1)	Curb Event Center (1,347); Nashville, TN
February 23, 2019; 3:00 p.m., ESPN+		SIU Edwardsville	W 87–54	22–5 (15–1)	Curb Event Center (2,017); Nashville, TN
February 28, 2019; 5:30 p.m., ESPN+		at UT Martin	L 68–71 ^{OT}	22–6 (15–2)	Skyhawk Arena (1,476); Martin, TN
March 2, 2019; 4:30 p.m., ESPN+		at Southeast Missouri State	W 92–86	23–6 (16–2)	Show Me Center (735); Cape Girardeau, MO
Ohio Valley Conference tournament
March 6, 2019; 1:00 p.m., ESPN+	(1)	vs. (8) Southeast Missouri State; First Round	W 74–65	24–6	Ford Center; Evansville, IN
March 8, 2019; 1:00 p.m., ESPN+	(1)	vs. (4) Tennessee Tech; Semifinals	W 62–48	25–6	Ford Center (767); Evansville, IN
March 9, 2019; 2:00 p.m., ESPN+	(1)	vs. (3) UT Martin; Championship game	W 59–53	26–6	Ford Center (827); Evansville, IN
NCAA women's tournament
March 22, 2019*; 12:45 p.m., ESPN2	(13 G)	at (4 G) No. 15 South Carolina; First round	L 52–74	26–7	Dale F. Halton Arena; Charlotte, NC
*Non-conference game. ^{#}Rankings from AP poll. (#) Tournament seedings in parentheses. G=Greensboro Region. All times are in Central.

== Rankings ==
Regular-season polls
Poll	Pre- season	Week 2	Week 3	Week 4	Week 5	Week 6	Week 7	Week 8	Week 9	Week 10	Week 11	Week 12	Week 13	Week 14	Week 15	Week 16	Week 17	Week 18	Week 19	Final
AP	RV																			N/A
Coaches		N/A																		

Legend
	Increase in ranking
	Decrease in ranking
	No change
(RV)	Received votes
(NR)	Not ranked

== See also ==
- 2018–19 Belmont Bruins men's basketball team
