= Becker High School =

Location
- 12000 Hancock St; Becker, Minnesota 55308; United States; 45.399045°N 93.871754°W

Information
- Type: Public high school
- Principal: David Kreft
- Teaching staff: 49.90 (FTE)
- Grades: 9–12
- Enrollment: 853 (2023–2024)
- Student to teacher ratio: 17.09
- Colors: Navy, Columbia blue, and white
- Athletics conference: Mississippi 8 Conference; Minnesota State High School League
- Team name: Bulldogs

Becker High School is a public high school in Becker, Minnesota, United States. Becker High School enrolls grades 9–12 and has an enrollment of approximately 800 students. It is the only high school located in Minnesota Public School District 726.

== Notable alumni ==
- Maren Westin (homeschooled), Becker basketball legend and Green Bay Phoenix player
- Mark Douglas Olson, former member of Minnesota House of Representatives, Districts 16B and 19A
- Matt Veldman, Former NFL tight end for the Jacksonville Jaguars
- Dillon Radunz, NFL Offensive Tackle for the Tennessee Titans
- Daisy Kent, The Bachelor Finalist on Season 28

== Achievements ==
Becker High School won the Class AAAA state championship for football on four separate occasions, winning championships in 2005, 2014, 2015, and most recently, an undefeated state title in 2024 over Totino-Grace High School 24-8.

In 2021, Becker girls’s basketball defeated #1 seeded Marshall 70-58 in an upset to win the Class AAA state championship, led by NCAA Division 1 Green Bay Phoenix commit Maren Westin, who scored 12 points in 13 minutes on 75% shooting.
