= Dillon Radunz =

American football player (born 1998)

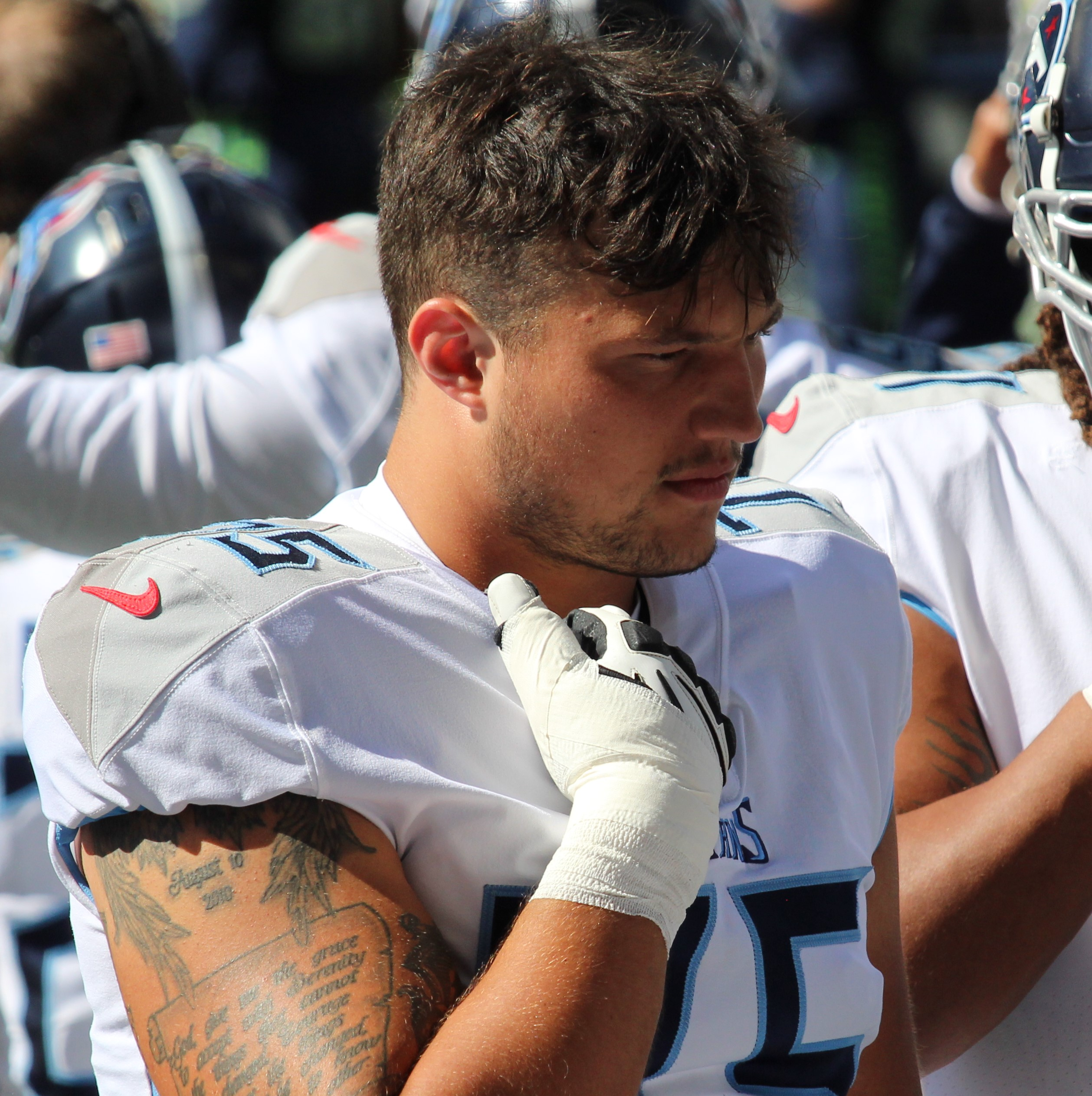
- Radunz with the Tennessee Titans in 2021

No. 77 – New Orleans Saints
- Position: Guard
- Roster status: Injured reserve

Personal information
- Born: March 28, 1998 (age 28); St. Cloud, Minnesota, U.S.
- Listed height: 6 ft 6 in (1.98 m)
- Listed weight: 301 lb (137 kg)

Career information
- High school: Becker (Becker, Minnesota)
- College: North Dakota State (2016–2020)
- NFL draft: 2021: 2nd round, 53rd overall pick

Career history
- Tennessee Titans (2021–2024); New Orleans Saints (2025–present)

Awards and highlights
- 3× FCS national champion (2017, 2018, 2019); First-team FCS All-American (2019); First-team All-MVFC (2019); Second-team All-MVFC (2018)

Career NFL statistics as of 2025
- Games played: 69
- Games started: 41
- Stats at Pro Football Reference

Dillon Jeffrey Radunz (born March 28, 1998) is an American professional football guard for the New Orleans Saints of the National Football League (NFL). He played college football for the North Dakota State Bison and was selected by the Tennessee Titans in the second round of the 2021 NFL draft.

== Early life ==
Radunz grew up mostly in Becker, Minnesota, after his family moved there when he was in first grade. He attended Becker High School, where he played basketball, football, and threw shot put and discus on the track and field team. He currently holds the Becker High School Shot put record at 57' 7". He was a two year starter at both offensive tackle and defensive end for Becker as the team went 25–1 and won back-to-back state championships. As a senior Radunz, was named the All-Area Football Player of the Year by the St. Cloud Times, East Central District North Division Most Valuable Player, and first-team All-State. He finished his high school career with 163 tackles, including 14 sacks.

A 2-star offensive tackle recruit, Radunz committed to play college football at North Dakota State over offers from Missouri, Northern Illinois, Northern Iowa, South Dakota, South Dakota State, and Wyoming.

== College career ==
Radunz redshirted as a true freshman. He was named a starter going into his freshman season, but suffered a season ending knee injury after playing 17 snaps in the season opener. He was named second-team All-Missouri Valley Football Conference (MVFC) and started 15 games as a redshirt sophomore. As a junior he played 682 snaps with 63 knockdowns and zero sacks allowed in 12 regular season games and started all 16 of the Bison's games and was named first-team All-MVFC and was a consensus first-team All-American selection. Radunz entered his redshirt senior season as a consensus preseason All-American. He started the only game of North Dakota State's fall season against Central Arkansas, as the MVFC postponed its season due to the COVID-19 pandemic. Radunz attended and played in the 2021 Senior Bowl.

== Professional career ==
Pre-draft measurables
Height	Weight	Arm length	Hand span	40-yard dash	10-yard split	20-yard split	20-yard shuttle	Three-cone drill	Vertical jump	Broad jump	Bench press
6 ft 5 3/4 in (1.97 m)	301 lb (137 kg)	34 in (0.86 m)	9 in (0.23 m)	5.12 s	1.76 s	3.01 s	4.57 s	7.26 s	32.0 in (0.81 m)	9 ft 4 in (2.84 m)	24 reps
All values from Pro Day

=== Tennessee Titans ===
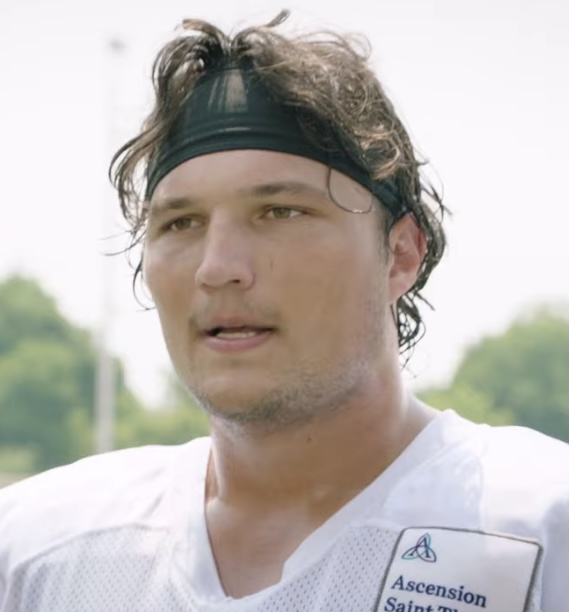
Radunz in 2021

Radunz was drafted by the Tennessee Titans in the second round, 53rd overall, in the 2021 NFL draft. On May 13, Radunz signed his four-year rookie contract with Tennessee. He made his first career start at left tackle in Week 16 in place of an injured Taylor Lewan. He appeared in 12 games during the 2021 season.

Radunz entered the 2022 season as a backup guard behind Aaron Brewer and Nate Davis. He appeared in 11 games at both guard spots due to injuries, and made four total starts. He was placed on injured reserve with a torn ACL on December 22, 2022.

Radunz played 16 games with 11 starts for the 2023 season.

Coming into the 2024 season, Radunz was named the starting right guard. He left the Week 1 matchup early, against the Chicago Bears, with a bruised rib. Through his first six games, Radunz allowed one sack, and committed two penalties. Radunz finished the season with 15 starts, missing two games due to injury.

=== New Orleans Saints ===
On March 24, 2025, Radunz signed with the New Orleans Saints on a one-year contract. He played in 15 games for New Orleans (including 10 starts) at left guard.

On March 12, 2026, Radunz re-signed with the Saints on a two-year contract. On August 8, Radunz tore his ACL during a Saturday practice and was placed on season-ending injured reserve.
