= 2019 Ohio Valley Conference women's basketball tournament =

- Classification: Division I
- Season: 2018–19
- Teams: 8
- Site: Ford Center; Evansville, Indiana
- Champions: Belmont (4 title)
- Winning coach: Bart Brooks (2 title)
- MVP: Jenny Roy (Belmont)
- Top scorer: Emanye Robertson (UT Martin) (58 points)
- Television: ESPN+

2018–19 Ohio Valley Conference women's basketball standings
| | Conf. | | | | Overall |
| Team | W | | L | PCT | W | | L | PCT |
|---|---|---|---|---|---|---|---|---|
| Belmont † | 16 | – | 2 | .889 | 26 | – | 7 | .788 |
| UT Martin | 13 | – | 5 | .722 | 23 | – | 9 | .719 |
| Morehead State | 13 | – | 5 | .722 | 24 | – | 11 | .686 |
| Tennessee Tech | 12 | – | 6 | .667 | 22 | – | 11 | .667 |
| Austin Peay | 10 | – | 8 | .556 | 15 | – | 15 | .500 |
| Jacksonville State | 9 | – | 9 | .500 | 15 | – | 15 | .500 |
| Murray State | 9 | – | 9 | .500 | 13 | – | 17 | .433 |
| SIU Edwardsville | 8 | – | 10 | .444 | 13 | – | 16 | .448 |
| Southeast Missouri State | 8 | – | 10 | .444 | 13 | – | 17 | .433 |
| Eastern Illinois | 5 | – | 13 | .278 | 11 | – | 18 | .379 |
| Tennessee State | 5 | – | 13 | .278 | 5 | – | 25 | .167 |
| Eastern Kentucky | 0 | – | 18 | .000 | 2 | – | 27 | .069 |
† 2019 OVC tournament winner Rankings from AP poll

The 2019 Ohio Valley Conference women's basketball tournament ended the 2018–19 season of Ohio Valley Conference women's basketball. The tournament was held March 6–March 9 at Ford Center in Evansville, Indiana. Belmont won the championship, defeating UT Martin 59–53. Belmont's Jenny Roy was named tournament MVP.

== Format ==
The OVC women's tournament is a traditional single-elimination tournament featuring the top eight teams in the conference regular-season standings. This differs from the format used in the OVC men's tournament; while that tournament also involves only eight of the league's 12 members, it has a radically different format, consisting of two stepladder brackets that produce the tournament finalists. The women's tournament is seeded so that the #8 seed faces the #1 seed in the first round, #7 faces #2, and so on. There is no reseeding, so if the #8 team were to defeat the #1 seed it would continue in the tournament playing the team which would have faced the #1 seed in the subsequent round (winner of #4 vs. #5).

== Seeds ==
| Seed | School | Conference | Overall |
|---|---|---|---|
| 1 | Belmont | 16–2 | 25–6 |
| 2 | Morehead State | 13–5 | 23–10 |
| 3 | UT Martin | 13–5 | 22–8 |
| 4 | Tennessee Tech | 12–6 | 21–9 |
| 5 | Austin Peay | 10–8 | 15–15 |
| 6 | Murray State | 9–9 | 13–17 |
| 7 | Jacksonville State | 9–9 | 14–16 |
| 8 | Southeast Missouri | 5–9 | 9–16 |
| – | SIU Edwardsville | 8–10 | 13–17 |
| – | Eastern Illinois | 5–13 | 11–18 |
| – | Tennessee State | 5–13 | 5–25 |
| – | Eastern Kentucky | 0–18 | 2–27 |

== Bracket ==
- All times central.

First round Wednesday, March 6 & Thursday, March 7 ESPN+ 1PM; 1PM; 3PM; 3PM
1 | Belmont | 74
8 | Southeast Missouri | 65
4 | Tennessee Tech | 68
5 | Austin Peay | 57
2 | Morehead State | 77
7 | Jacksonville State | 60
3 | UT Martin | 77
6 | Murray State | 56

Semifinals; Friday, March 8 ESPN+ 1PM; 3PM
1 | Belmont | 62
4 | Tennessee Tech | 48
2 | Morehead State | 67
3 | UT Martin | 68

Championship; Saturday, March 9 ESPN+ 2PM
1 | Belmont | 59
3 | UT Martin | 53
