= 2018–19 Northern Kentucky Norse women's basketball team =

Intercollegiate basketball season

2018–19 Northern Kentucky Norse women's basketball
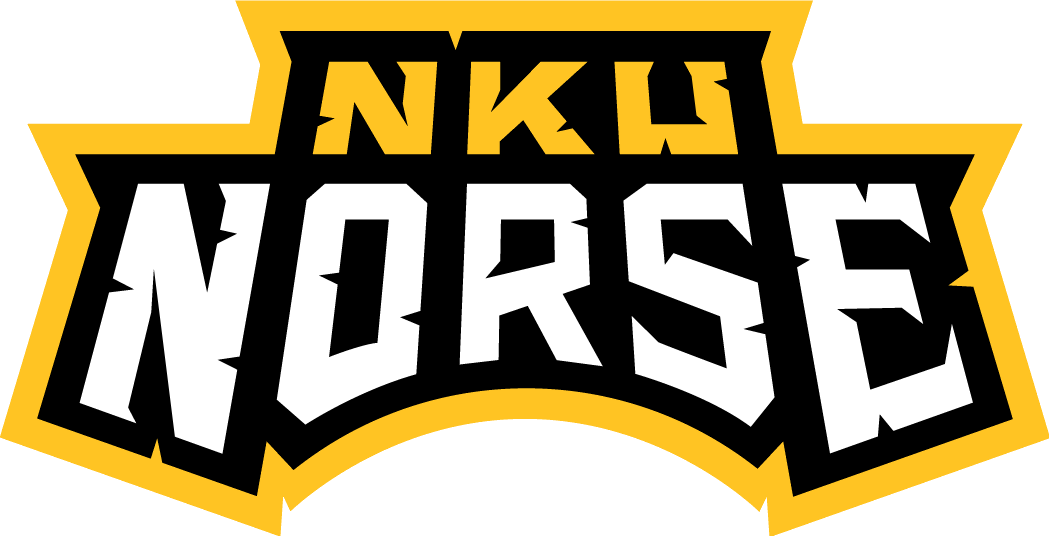
- Conference: Horizon League
- Record: 11–18 (9–7 Horizon)
- Head coach: Camryn Whitaker (3rd season)
- Assistant coaches: Ashley Earley; Kayla Bowlin; Lauren Stodola
- Home arena: BB&T Arena

2018–19 Horizon League women's basketball standings
	Conf.				Overall
Team	W		L	PCT	W		L	PCT
Wright State†	16	–	2	.889	27	–	7	.794
Green Bay	15	–	3	.833	22	–	10	.688
Youngstown State	13	–	5	.722	22	–	10	.688
IUPUI	13	–	5	.722	20	–	12	.625
Milwaukee	10	–	8	.556	15	–	15	.500
Northern Kentucky	10	–	8	.556	11	–	18	.379
Cleveland State	7	–	11	.389	10	–	19	.345
Oakland	3	–	15	.167	6	–	24	.200
Detroit Mercy	2	–	16	.111	4	–	25	.138
UIC	1	–	17	.056	3	–	26	.103
† 2019 Horizon League tournament winner Rankings from AP poll

The 2018–19 Northern Kentucky Norse women's basketball team represented Northern Kentucky University in the 2018–19 NCAA Division I women's basketball season. The Norse, led by their three-year head coach Camryn Whitaker, played their home games at BB&T Arena. They were members of the Horizon League where they finished the season 11–18, 9–7 in a tie for fifth place. They lost in the first round of the Horizon League women's tournament to IUPUI.

== Roster ==
2018–19 Northern Kentucky Norse women's basketball team
Players
Coaches

Pos.	#	Name	Height	Year	Previous school	Hometown
G	1	Grace White	5 ft 9 in (1.75 m)	So	Grayson County	Leitchfield, KY
G	2	Kennedy Archer	5 ft 10 in (1.78 m)	RS Jr	Franklin Central; Coastal Carolina	Indianapolis, IN
G	4	Taylor Clos	5 ft 5 in (1.65 m)	Fr	Campbell County	Alexandria, KY
G	5	Samari Mowbray	6 ft 1 in (1.85 m)	So	Mason	Mason, OH
F/C	10	Grayson Rose	6 ft 3 in (1.91 m)	So	James A. Garfield	Garrettsville, OH
G	11	Taryn Taugher	5 ft 8 in (1.73 m)	Sr	Freeland	Freeland, MI
F	13	Jazmyne Giest	5 ft 11 in (1.8 m)	So	Homestead	Fort Wayne, IN
F	14	Reece Mungar	6 ft 1 in (1.85 m)	So	Bishop Ryan Catholic	Stoney Creek, ON
F	20	Chyna Anthony	6 ft 1 in (1.85 m)	So	New Albany	New Albany, IN
F	23	Kailey Coffey	5 ft 10 in (1.78 m)	So	Russell County	Russell Springs, KY
G	24	Molly Glick	5 ft 11 in (1.8 m)	RS Jr	Arcadia	Fostoria, OH
G	25	Ally Niece	5 ft 8 in (1.73 m)	Fr	Simon Kenton	Independence, KY
F/C	30	Emmy Souder	6 ft 2 in (1.88 m)	Fr	Mercer County	Harrodsburg, KY

Head coach

- Camryn Whitaker (Western Kentucky)

Assistant coach(es)

- Ashley Earley (Vanderbilt)
- Kayla Bowlin (Eckerd)
- Lauren Stodola (Grand Valley State)

Legend

- (C) Team captain
- (S) Suspended
- (I) Ineligible
- (W) Walk-on
- Injured
- Current redshirt

Roster

== Schedule ==
Date time, TV	Rank^{#}	Opponent^{#}	Result	Record	Site (attendance) city, state
Exhibition
Nov 4, 2018*; 2:00 pm		Pikeville	W 78–38		BB&T Arena (993); Highland Heights, KY
Non-conference regular season
Nov 7, 2018*; 7:00 pm, ESPN+		Alderson Broaddus	W 73–32	1–0	BB&T Arena (998); Highland Heights, KY
Nov 17, 2018*; 3:00 pm, ESPN3		at Kent State; Kent State Classic	L 61–62	1–1	MAC Center (1,273); Kent, OH
Nov 18, 2018*; 11:00 am		vs. Akron; Kent State Classic	L 60–77	1–2	MAC Center (318); Kent, OH
Nov 21, 2018*; 6:00 pm, ESPN+		Belmont	L 53–71	1–3	BB&T Arena (1,052); Highland Heights, KY
Nov 26, 2018*; 8:00 pm, ESPN+		at Austin Peay	L 48–52	1–4	Dunn Center (212); Clarksville, TN
Dec 7, 2018*; 7:00 pm, ESPN3		Illinois State	L 53–58	1–5	BB&T Arena (1,013); Highland Heights, KY
Dec 15, 2018*; 11:30 am, ACCNE		at No. 4 Louisville	L 59–92	1–6	KFC Yum! Center (7,781); Louisville, KY
Dec 19, 2018*; 7:00 pm		vs. La Salle; Friar Holiday Classic	L 56–74	1–7	Alumni Hall (112); Providence, RI
Dec 20, 2018*; 4:30 pm		at Providence; Friar Holiday Classic	L 43–48	1–8	Alumni Hall (217); Providence, RI
Dec 21, 2018*; 12:30 pm		vs. Pepperdine; Friar Holiday Classic	L 46–51	1–9	Alumni Hall (146); Providence, RI
Horizon League regular season
Dec 28, 2018; 8:00 pm, ESPN+		at UIC	W 67–49	2–9 (1–0)	Credit Union 1 Arena (340); Chicago, IL
Dec 30, 2018; 7:00 pm, ESPN+		at IUPUI	L 48–70	2–10 (1–1)	The Jungle (350); Indianapolis, IN
Jan 3, 2019; 7:00 pm, ESPN+		Milwaukee	W 55–54	3–10 (2–1)	BB&T Arena (829); Highland Heights, KY
Jan 5, 2019; 2:00 pm, ESPN3		Green Bay	L 61–81	3–11 (2–2)	BB&T Arena (1,288); Highland Heights, KY
Jan 12, 2019; 2:00 pm, ESPN3		Wright State	L 55–61	3–12 (2–3)	BB&T Arena (1,294); Highland Heights, KY
Jan 18, 2019; 11:00 am, ESPN+		at Cleveland State	L 47–76	3–13 (2–4)	Wolstein Center (3,127); Cleveland, OH
Jan 22, 2019; 1:00 pm		at Youngstown State	L 66–77	3–14 (2–5)	Beeghly Center (1,117); Youngstown, OH
Jan 25, 2019; 11:00 am, ESPN+		Detroit Mercy	W 68–56	4–14 (3–5)	BB&T Arena (3,751); Highland Heights, KY
Jan 27, 2019; 2:00 pm, ESPN3		Oakland	W 72–50	5–14 (4–5)	BB&T Arena (1,245); Highland Heights, KY
Jan 31, 2019; 7:00 pm, ESPN+		IUPUI	W 60–57	6–14 (5–5)	BB&T Arena (953); Highland Heights, KY
Feb 2, 2019; 2:00 pm, ESPN3		UIC	W 78–44	7–14 (6–5)	BB&T Arena (1,113); Highland Heights, KY
Feb 7, 2019; 8:00 pm, ESPN+		at Green Bay	L 61–81	7–15 (6–6)	Kress Events Center (1,889); Green Bay, WI
Feb 9, 2019; 3:00 pm, ESPN+		at Milwaukee	L 38–59	7–16 (6–7)	Klotsche Center (709); Milwaukee, WI
Feb 16, 2019; 2:00 pm, ESPN3		at Wright State	L 56–78	7–17 (6–8)	Nutter Center (1,294); Fairborn, OH
Feb 22, 2019; 7:00 pm, ESPN+		Youngstown State	W 65–62	8–17 (7–8)	BB&T Arena (1,277); Highland Heights, KY
Feb 24, 2019; 2:00 pm, ESPN+		Cleveland State	W 74–55	9–17 (8–8)	BB&T Arena (1,370); Highland Heights, KY
Feb 28, 2019; 4:00 pm, ESPN+		at Oakland	W 74–63	10–17 (9–8)	Athletics Center O'rena (312); Auburn Hills, MI
Mar 2, 2019; 1:00 pm, ESPN+		at Detroit Mercy	W 81–63	11–17 (10–8)	Calihan Hall (297); Detroit, MI
Horizon League Women's Tournament
Mar 5, 2019; 7:00 pm, ESPN+	(5)	at (4) IUPUI; Quarterfinals	L 44–60	11–18	The Jungle (424); Indianapolis, IN
*Non-conference game. ^{#}Rankings from AP Poll. (#) Tournament seedings in parentheses. All times are in Eastern Time.

== See also ==
- 2018–19 Northern Kentucky Norse men's basketball team
