= Katrina Merriweather =

American basketball coach

Current position
- Title: Head coach
- Team: Cincinnati
- Conference: Big 12
- Record: 40–52 (.435)

Biographical details
- Born: August 14, 1979 (age 47); Indianapolis, Indiana, U.S.

Playing career
- 1997–2001: Cincinnati

Coaching career (HC unless noted)
- 2001–2002: Cincinnati (GA)
- 2002–2003: UIC (assistant)
- 2003–2006: Purdue (assistant/RC)
- 2010–2012: Wright State (assistant)
- 2012–2016: Wright State (assistant/RC)
- 2016–2021: Wright State
- 2021–2023: Memphis
- 2023–present: Cincinnati

Head coaching record
- Overall: 191–122 (.610)
- Tournaments: 1–2 (NCAA); 3–3 (WNIT)

Accomplishments and honors

Championships
- 3× Horizon League regular season (2017, 2019, 2021); 2× Horizon League conference tournament (2019, 2021)

Awards
- 3× Horizon League Coach of the Year (2017, 2019, 2021)

Katrina Merriweather (born August 14, 1979) is an American basketball coach who is currently the head women's basketball coach at the University of Cincinnati. Prior to that, she was head coach at Wright State University and the University of Memphis.

== Playing career ==
Merriweather played for Cincinnati and head coach Laurie Pirtle from 1997 to 2001.

=== Cincinnati statistics ===
Legend
GP	Games played	GS	Games started	MPG	Minutes per game
FG%	Field goal percentage	3P%	3-point field goal percentage	FT%	Free throw percentage
RPG	Rebounds per game	APG	Assists per game	SPG	Steals per game
BPG	Blocks per game	PPG	Points per game	**Bold**	Career high

Year	Team	GP	Points	FG%	3P%	FT%	RPG	APG	SPG	BPG	PPG
1997–98	Cincinnati	29	50	40.9%	0.0%	82.4%	1.0	0.3	0.1	0.0	1.7
1998–99	Cincinnati	25	59	31.3%	0.1%	69.2%	1.6	0.5	0.2	**0.1**	2.4
1999–00	Cincinnati	**33**	45	**41.0**%	-	68.4%	1.5	0.5	-	-	2.1
2000–01	Cincinnati	32	**174**	41.0%	**18.8%**	**81.4%**	**2.3**	**1.4**	**0.3**	-	**5.4**
Career		107	328	38.8%	14.3%	77.3%	1.6	0.7	0.2	0.0	3.1

== Coaching career ==
Merriweather began her coaching career as a graduate assistant at her alma mater Cincinnati in 2001. After spending one season with the Bearcats, she spent a season at UIC as an assistant before joining Purdue as an assistant coach and recruiting coordinator. Merriweather was suspended indefinitely during the 2005–06 season after she admitted to typing, correcting, and revising a paper for a point guard on the basketball team during the season, as well as making 105 impermissible phone calls to recruits. As a result, Purdue was placed on probation for the next two seasons and Merriweather did not return to Purdue after the 2005–06 season.

=== Wright State ===
After four seasons away from college basketball, Merriweather was hired as an assistant coach at Wright State in 2010. She added recruiting coordinator duties in 2012.

Merriweather was promoted to head coach in 2016 after Mike Bradbury departed to accept the head coaching position at New Mexico. At Wright State, she led the program to their first ever NCAA tournament win while also winning three Horizon League regular season titles and three Horizon League coach of the year awards.

=== Memphis ===
Merriweather was named the head coach at Memphis on March 29, 2021, the 12th head coach in program history.

=== Cincinnati ===
On March 25, 2023, Merriweather returned to Cincinnati to become the 10th head coach in the program's history.

On January 7, 2026, Merriweather's Bearcats defeated #11 Iowa State 71–63. The win marked the highest-ranked victory in program history and Cincinnati's first win over a ranked opponent since 2011.

== Head coaching record ==
Record table
Season	Team	Overall	Conference	Standing	Postseason
Wright State Raiders (Horizon League) (2016–2021)
2016–17	Wright State	25–9	15–3	T–1st	WNIT Second Round
2017–18	Wright State	23–11	12–6	3rd	WNIT First Round
2018–19	Wright State	27–7	16–2	1st	NCAA Division I Round of 64
2019–20	Wright State	19–12	13–5	T–2nd	
2020–21	Wright State	19–8	15–5	T–1st	NCAA Division I Round of 32
Wright State:		113–47 (.706)	71–21 (.772)		
Memphis Tigers (American Athletic Conference) (2021–2023)
2021–22	Memphis	16–12	6–9	7th	
2022–23	Memphis	22–11	11–4	2nd	WNIT Super 16
Memphis:		38–23 (.623)	17–13 (.567)		
Cincinnati Bearcats (Big 12 Conference) (2023–present)
2023–24	Cincinnati	14–18	5–13	T–11th	WNIT Second Round
2024–25	Cincinnati	15–14	7–11	10th	
2025–26	Cincinnati	11–20	6–12	13th	
Cincinnati:		40–52 (.435)	18–36 (.333)		
Total:		191–122 (.610)			
National champion Postseason invitational champion Conference regular season champion Conference regular season and conference tournament champion Division regular season champion Division regular season and conference tournament champion Conference tournament champion
