= Wright State Raiders women's basketball =

2026–27 Wright State Raiders women's basketball team
- University: Wright State University
- Head coach: Kari Hoffman (6th season)
- Location: Dayton, Ohio
- Arena: Nutter Center (capacity: 12,000)
- Conference: Horizon League
- Nickname: Raiders
- Colors: Hunter green and vegas gold
- Student section: Raider Rowdies

NCAA Division I tournament round of 32
- 2021

NCAA Division I tournament appearances
- 2014, 2019, 2021

Conference tournament champions
- 2014, 2019, 2021

Conference regular-season champions
- 2017, 2019

The Wright State Raiders team is the NCAA Division I women's basketball team that represents Wright State University in Dayton, Ohio. The team currently compete in the Horizon League, and are coached by Kari Hoffman. They play at the Wright State University Nutter Center in Fairborn, Ohio. The official capacity for basketball games is 10,400.

== History ==
Wright State first sponsored women's basketball in 1973. In 1990, Wright State joined the North Star Conference, where they played until 1992, when the conference was effectively absorbed by the Mid-Continent Conference. In 1995, Wright State moved to the Midwestern Collegiate Conference. The conference changed its name to the Horizon League on June 4, 2001.

The team earned its first NCAA Tournament win in March 2021, upsetting the No. 4 Arkansas Razorbacks 66–62.

=== Retired numbers ===
Wright State has retired one jersey number in its history.

No.	Player	Position	Career
4	Kim Demmings	G	2011–2016

== Facilities ==
The Wright State Raiders currently play their home games at the Wright State University Nutter Center (originally named Ervin J. Nutter Center). Ervin J. Nutter donated $1.5 million to Wright State University in 1986. Funds from both the state of Ohio and the university contributed an additional $8 million to construction efforts, which began in 1988. The center was completed in 1990.

== Coaches ==
The Raiders have had eight coaches in their 52-year history. Current coach Kari Hoffman was hired in 2021.

Coach	Years	Overall record	Win %
Arnelle Jackson	1973–1975	14–31	.311
Pat Davis	1976–1989	187–172	.521
Terry Hill	1990–1996	61–130	.319
Lisa Fitch	1997–2000	30–80	.273
Bridgett Williams	2001–2009	109–155	.413
Mike Bradbury	2010–2016	104–62	.627
Katrina Merriweather	2016–2021	113–47	.706
Kari Hoffman	2021–present	50–102	.329
Overall record:		668 – 779	.462

=== Current coaching staff ===
Name	Position
Kari Hoffman	Head coach
Josh Mason	Assistant coach
Danielle Spiliotis	Assistant coach
Lauryn Fox	Assistant coach
Claire Henson	Assistant coach, director of operations

== Seasons ==
=== WSU's records season by season during their Division II tenure ===
Season	Head coach	Overall record	Leading scorer	MVP
Division II Independent
1973–74	Arnelle Jackson	1–13	Terry York	Jeanne Keister
1974–75	Arnelle Jackson	4–10	Margie Coate	Margie Coate
1975–76	Arnelle Jackson	9–8	Connie Philon	Margie Coate
1976–77	Pat Davis	5–12	Cindy Mercer	Cindy Mercer
1977–78	Pat Davis	10–10	Jayne Helmlinger	Jayne Helmlinger
1978–79	Pat Davis	10–13	Jackie Swenson	Biermann / Swenson
1979–80	Pat Davis	17–9	Jodi Martin	Jodi Martin
1980–81	Pat Davis	15–10	Jodi Martin	Jodi Martin
1981–82	Pat Davis	14–12	Jodi Martin	Jodi Martin
1982–83	Pat Davis	11–14	Jodi Martin	Jodi Martin
1983–84	Pat Davis	17–10	Lois Warburg	Lois Warburg
1984–85	Pat Davis	16–12	Jenny Horn	Jenny Horn
1985–86	Pat Davis	18–10	Jenny Horn	Jenny Horn
1986–87	Pat Davis	24–5	Janet Emerson	Janet Emerson

=== WSU's records season by season since joining Division I in 1987 ===
Season	Head coach	Overall record	Conf. record	Postseason
Division I Independent
1987–88	Pat Davis	17–11	0–0	–
1988–89	Pat Davis	10–18	0–0	–
1989–90	Pat Davis	3–25	0–0	–
North Star Conference
1990–91	Terry Hall	4–24	3–11	–
1991–92	Terry Hall	8–20	5–7	–
Mid-Continent Conference
1992–93	Terry Hall	9–18	5–11	–
1993–94	Terry Hall	12–15	7–11	–
Midwestern Collegiate Conference
1994–95	Terry Hall	11–16	5–11	–
1995–96	Terry Hall	11–16	5–11	–
1996–97	Terry Hall	6–21	4–12	–
1997–98	Lisa Fitch	9–18	5–9	–
1998–99	Lisa Fitch	7–20	3–11	–
1999–2000	Lisa Fitch	8–20	5–9	–
2000–01	Lisa Fitch	6–22	3–11	–
Horizon League
2001–02	Bridgett Williams	6–22	4–12	–
2002–03	Bridgett Williams	11–17	8–8	–
2003–04	Bridgett Williams	9–20	5–11	–
2004–05	Bridgett Williams	19–11	11–5	–
2005–06	Bridgett Williams	12–16	8–8	–
2006–07	Bridgett Williams	10–18	8–8	–
2007–08	Bridgett Williams	16–16	11–5	–
2008–09	Bridgett Williams	15–16	10–8	–
2009–10	Bridgett Williams	11–19	10–8	–
2010–11	Mike Bradbury	20–13	11–7	WBI 2nd Round
2011–12	Mike Bradbury	21–13	12–6	WBI 2nd Round
2012–13	Mike Bradbury	12–18	6–10	–
2013–14	Mike Bradbury	26–9	12–4	NCAA 1st Round
2014–15	Mike Bradbury	25–9	12–4	WNIT 1st Round
2015–16	Mike Bradbury	24–11	12–6	WNIT 1st Round
2016–17	Katrina Merriweather	25–9	15–3	WNIT 2nd Round
2017–18	Katrina Merriweather	23–11	12–6	WNIT 1st Round
2018–19	Katrina Merriweather	27–6	16–2	NCAA 1st Round
2019–20	Katrina Merriweather	19–12	13–5	(Note: No tournaments held due to the COVID-19 pandemic.)
2020–21	Katrina Merriweather	19–8	15–5	NCAA 2nd Round
2021–22	Kari Hoffman	4–19	3–18	–
2022–23	Kari Hoffman	8–24	6–14	–
2023–24	Kari Hoffman	18–15	11–9	–
2024–25	Kari Hoffman	10–22	7–13	–
2025–26	Kari Hoffman	10–22	6–14	–

=== Record vs. Horizon League opponents ===
- Cleveland State: 42–49
- Detroit: 41–29
- Green Bay: 7–77
- IU INDY: 15–12
- Milwaukee: 38–36
- Northern Kentucky: 19–18
- Oakland: 24–8
- Purdue Ft. Wayne 12-14
- Robert Morris 6-11
- Youngstown State: 43–33

== NCAA Tournament history ==
Year	Seed	Round	Opponent	Result/score
2014	#14	First round	#3 Kentucky	L 60–106
2019	#13	First round	#4 Texas A&M	L 84–61
2021	#13	First round Second round	#4 Arkansas #5 Missouri State	W 66–62; L 64–39

=== NCAA Tournament seeding history ===
The 1982 NCAA Women's Division I Basketball Tournament was the first women's basketball tournament held under the auspices of the NCAA.

Years →	2014	2019	2021
Seeds	14	13	13

== Tournament championships ==
Wright State has won three conference tournament championships. On March 16, 2014, they defeated Green Bay 88–69 to clinch their first Horizon League tournament championship. The Raiders claimed their second Horizon League tournament championship in 2019 when they defeated Green Bay 55–52. They claimed their third with a 53–41 victory over IUPUI on March 9, 2021.

Season	Coach	Opponent	Score	Site	Overall record	Conference record	Conference
2013–14	Mike Bradbury	Green Bay	88–69	Green Bay, WI	26–8	12–4	Horizon
2018–19	Katrina Merriweather	Green Bay	55–52	Detroit, MI	27–6	16–2	Horizon
2020–21	Katrina Merriweather	IUPUI	53–41	Indianapolis, IN	19–7	15–5	Horizon
Horizon League tournament championships:						3	

== Women's National Invitation Tournament ==
Wright State has appeared in four Women's National Invitation Tournaments. Wright State's record is 1–4 in the Women's National Invitational Tournament.

Year	Round	Opponent	Result/score
2015	First round	Toledo	L 64–72
2016	First round	Michigan	L 53- 81
2017	First round	Central Michigan	W 66–64
2017	Second round	Michigan	L 66–71
2018	First round	Toledo	L 50–64

== Women's Basketball Invitational ==
Wright State has appeared in two Women's Basketball Invitational tournaments. Their record is 2–2.

Year	Round	Opponent	Result/score
2010	First round Second round	Buffalo; Manhattan	W 82–79; L 73–75
2011	First round Second round	SIU Edwardsville; Seattle	W 73–64; L 65–82

== All-time statistical leaders ==
=== Career leaders ===
Points scored:	Kim Demmings	2,677
Assists:	Nettie Carter	446
Rebounds:	Lori Collins	897
Steals:	Gwen Lenzy	350

=== Single-season leaders ===
Points scored:	Kim Demmings	784	(2013)
Assists:	Tay'ler Mingo	196	(2014)
Rebounds:	Tayler Stanton	362	(2014)
Steals:	Tammy Stover	121	(1987)

=== Single-game leaders ===
Points scored:	Tiffany Webb	49	(2003)
Assists:	Tay'ler Mingo	12	(2015)
Rebounds:	Margie Coate	25	(1975)
Steals:	Tammy Stover	13	(1988)
