= Kevin Borseth =

American basketball coach (born 1954)

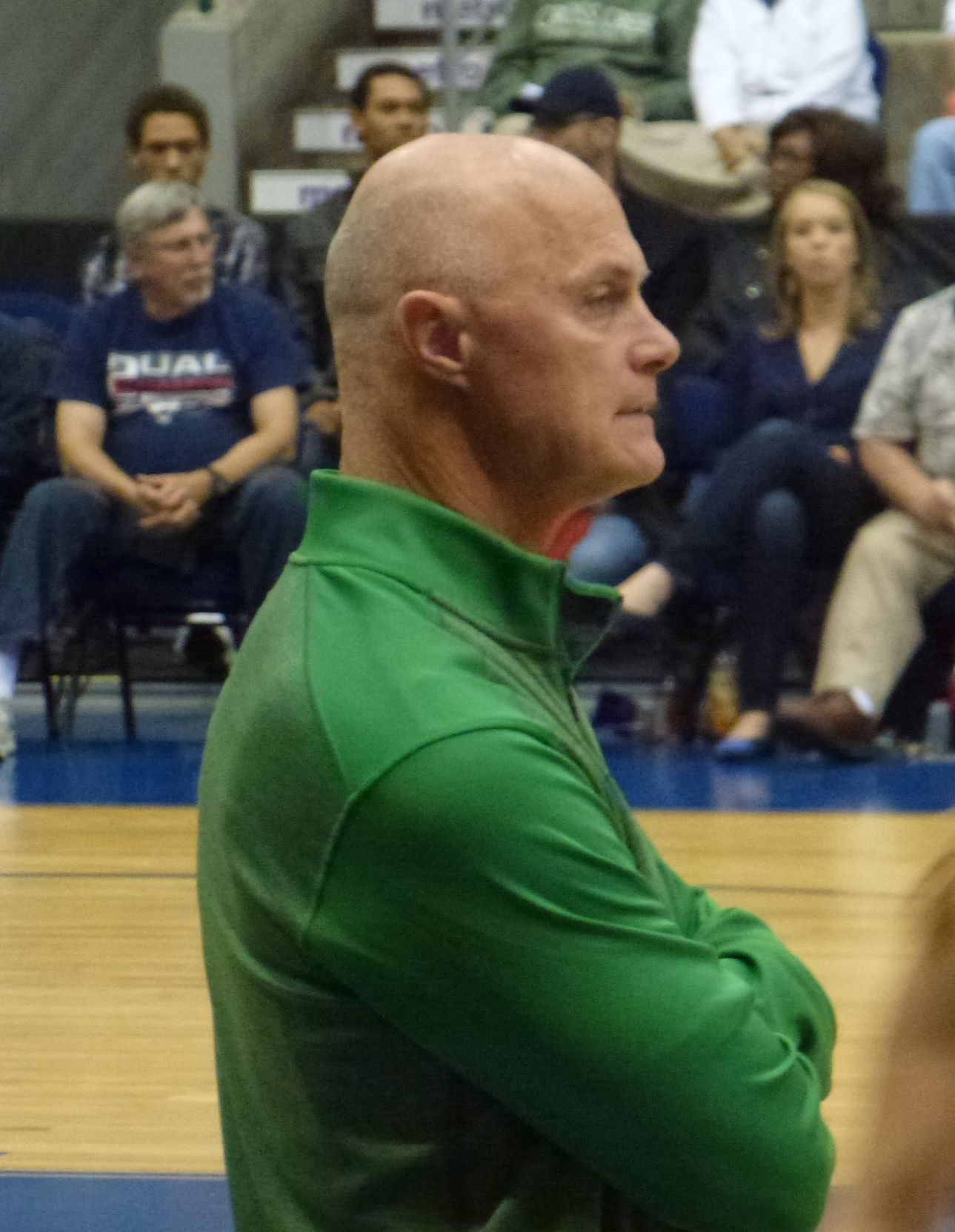
- Borseth in 2014

Biographical details
- Born: June 9, 1954 (age 72); Bessemer, Michigan

Playing career
- 1972–1974: Gogebic CC
- 1974–1976: Lake Superior State

Coaching career (HC unless noted)
- 1982–1987: Gogebic CC
- 1987–1998: Michigan Tech
- 1998–2007: Green Bay
- 2007–2012: Michigan
- 2012–2024: Green Bay

Head coaching record
- Overall: 821–316 (.722)
- Tournaments: 2–13 (NCAA D-I); 7–7 (NCAA D-II); 7–6 (WNIT)

Accomplishments and honors

Championships
- NCAA Division II Regional – Final Four (1993); 15× Horizon League Regular season (1999–2007, 2013–2018); 13× Horizon League Conference Tournament (1999, 2000, 2002–2005, 2007, 2013, 2015–2018, 2024); 4× Great Lakes Intercollegiate Athletic Conference Regular season (1991–1993, 1995); Great Lakes Intercollegiate Athletic Conference Conference Tournament (1993)

Awards
- 8× Horizon League Coach of the Year (1999, 2000, 2002–2005, 2007, 2014)

Kevin Paul Borseth (born June 9, 1954) is a retired women's basketball coach who best known for his two stints as the head coach at the University of Wisconsin–Green Bay.

== Career ==
A native of Bessemer, Michigan, he compiled a 821–316 record in 37 years as a head basketball coach. He finished his career with 35 winning seasons and 28 20-plus win seasons. His teams have either won or shared 20 conference titles and won their conference tournament 14 times. Borseth's teams qualified for the post-season in 30 of his 37 seasons including 14 NCAA Division I tournament appearances, seven NCAA Division II tournament appearances and nine WNIT appearances.

=== Gogebic Community College ===
Borseth began coaching at Gogebic Community College in Ironwood, Michigan.

=== Michigan Technological University ===
He then spent 11 years as head coach of the women's basketball program at Michigan Technological University in Houghton, Michigan.During his tenure, Borseth accumulated a 225–97 (.699) record, claimed four Great Lakes Intercollegiate Athletic Conference (GLIAC) championships, and qualified for the NCAA Division II Tournament seven times. During the 1992–93 campaign, Borseth led the Huskies to a 30–3 mark en route to a third-place finish in the NCAA Division II Tournament.

=== University of Wisconsin–Green Bay ===
He then served as head women's basketball coach for the Green Bay Phoenix at the University of Wisconsin–Green Bay from 1997 to 2007. He posted a 216–62 record with 20-win seasons in eight of nine years during his tenure. His 2006–2007 team ranks as the best in school history. The team went 29–4, including a perfect 16–0 in conference play, and established school and conference records for wins. From December 7 to March 18, UWGB had the longest winning streak in the nation at twenty-six consecutive wins.

=== Michigan ===
Soon after taking over Michigan, he became well known after the video of a very emotional news conference, which took place February 28, 2008 after a dramatic loss to Wisconsin, became a popular internet video. In the conference, Borseth started off by throwing his clipboard at the podium with intense force, then passionately complained about his team giving up a double-digit lead, failing to collect offensive rebounds and being called for a foul on what he considered a legitimate box-out.

In his first season at Michigan, the team improved from 10–20 to 19–14, enjoying their first winning season and postseason bid (Women's NIT) in six seasons. Borseth led the Wolverines to two more WNIT berths in the next three seasons and returned them to the NCAA tournament in 2012, where they lost in the first round.

=== Return to Green Bay ===
On April 4, 2012, Borseth announced he was resigning as Michigan's coach and returning to Green Bay to coach the Green Bay Phoenix women's basketball team at UW-Green Bay due to it being closer to his home. He was replaced by Kim Barnes Arico, who had spent the previous ten years at St. John's. Borseth would appear in six NCAA Tournaments in his final run as a head coach, winning six Horizon League tournament championships, and eight regular season championships in the conference. Borseth’s final freshmen recruits to college basketball were Maren Westin, Sophie Lahti, and Meghan Schultz before Borseth retired following the 2023-24 season.

== Head Coaching record ==
- Green Bay
- Horizon

Record table
Season	Team	Overall	Conference	Standing	Postseason
Michigan Tech (Great Lakes Intercollegiate Athletic Conference) (1987–1998)
1987–88	Michigan Tech	10–17	3–13	9th	
1988–89	Michigan Tech	16–11	9–7	3rd	
1989–90	Michigan Tech	17–11	8–8	T–5th	
1990–91	Michigan Tech	22–7	14–2	1st	NCAA D-II First Round
1991–92	Michigan Tech	23–6	14–2	1st	NCAA D-II First Round
1992–93	Michigan Tech	30–3	15–1	1st	NCAA D-II third place
1993–94	Michigan Tech	23–6	15–3	2nd	NCAA D-II First Round
1994–95	Michigan Tech	24–6	15–3	1st	NCAA D-II Regional final
1995–96	Michigan Tech	18–11	12–6	4th	
1996–97	Michigan Tech	21–9	15–3	2nd (North)	NCAA D-II Regional final
1997–98	Michigan Tech	21–10	12–6	T–3rd (North)	NCAA D-II Regional final
Michigan Tech:		225–97 (.699)	132–54 (.710)		
Green Bay (Midwestern Collegiate Conference/Horizon League) (1998–2007)
1998–99	Green Bay	19–10	13–1	1st	NCAA 1st Round
1999–00	Green Bay	21–9	12–2	1st	NCAA First Round
2000–01	Green Bay	22–9	12–2	T–1st	WNIT First round
2001–02	Green Bay	24–7	15–1	1st	NCAA First round
2002–03	Green Bay	28–4	15–1	1st	NCAA Second round
2003–04	Green Bay	23–8	13–3	1st	NCAA First round
2004–05	Green Bay	27–4	15–1	1st	NCAA First round
2005–06	Green Bay	23–7	14–2	T–1st	WNIT First round
2006–07	Green Bay	29–4	16–0	1st	NCAA 2nd Round
Green Bay (first stint):		216–62 (.777)	125–13 (.906)		
Michigan (Big Ten Conference) (2007–2012)
2007–08	Michigan	19–14	9–9	T–6th	WNIT Quarterfinals
2008–09	Michigan	10–20	3–15	T–11th	
2009–10	Michigan	21–14	8–10	T–7th	WNIT Semifinals
2010–11	Michigan	17–13	10–6	4th	WNIT First round
2011–12	Michigan	20–12	8–8	7th	NCAA 1st Round
Michigan:		87–73 (.544)	38–48 (.442)		
Green Bay (Horizon League) (2012–2024)
2012–13	Green Bay	29–3	16–0	1st	NCAA 1st Round
2013–14	Green Bay	22–10	13–3	1st	WNIT First round
2014–15	Green Bay	28–5	15–1	1st	NCAA 1st Round
2015–16	Green Bay	28–5	16–2	1st	NCAA 1st Round
2016–17	Green Bay	27–6	15–3	1st	NCAA 1st Round
2017–18	Green Bay	29–4	16–2	1st	NCAA 1st Round
2018–19	Green Bay	22–10	15–3	2nd	WNIT 1st Round
2019–20	Green Bay	19–13	13–5	T–2nd	
2020–21	Green Bay	15–7	14–4	3rd	
2021–22	Green Bay	19–8	14–4	3rd	WNIT 1st Round
2022–23	Green Bay	28–6	18–2	1st	WNIT 2nd Round
2023–24	Green Bay	27–7	17–3	2nd	NCAA 1st Round
Green Bay (second stint):		303–84 (.783)	182–32 (.850)		
Green Bay (overall):		509–146 (.777)	307–45 (.872)		
Total:		821–316 (.722)			
National champion Postseason invitational champion Conference regular season champion Conference regular season and conference tournament champion Division regular season champion Division regular season and conference tournament champion Conference tournament champion

== Coaching tree ==
Five of Borseth's former assistants are currently head coaches at other schools:

- Dawn Plitzuweit – Minnesota. Former coach of West Virginia, South Dakota, Northern Kentucky, and Grand Valley State (D2)
- Amanda Leonhard-Perry – St. Norbert College (D3)
- Mike Williams – Grand Valley State (D2) and former coach of Davenport (D2)
- Hannah Iverson – UW–Eau Claire (D3). Former coach of UW-Stout (D3)

Two of Borseth's former assistants were college head coaches:

- John Barnes – Youngstown State
- Kia Damon-Olson – Lafayette

== See also ==
- List of college women's basketball career coaching wins leaders
