= 2019 Horizon League women's basketball tournament =

- Classification: Division I
- Season: 2018–19
- Teams: 8
- Site: Campus sites (first round); Little Caesars Arena (semifinals and Finals); Detroit, Michigan
- Champions: Wright State (2nd title)
- Winning coach: Katrina Merriweather (1st title)
- MVP: Michal Miller (Wright State)

2018–19 Horizon League women's basketball standings
| | Conf. | | | | Overall |
| Team | W | | L | PCT | W | | L | PCT |
|---|---|---|---|---|---|---|---|---|
| Wright State† | 16 | – | 2 | .889 | 27 | – | 7 | .794 |
| Green Bay | 15 | – | 3 | .833 | 22 | – | 10 | .688 |
| Youngstown State | 13 | – | 5 | .722 | 22 | – | 10 | .688 |
| IUPUI | 13 | – | 5 | .722 | 20 | – | 12 | .625 |
| Milwaukee | 10 | – | 8 | .556 | 15 | – | 15 | .500 |
| Northern Kentucky | 10 | – | 8 | .556 | 11 | – | 18 | .379 |
| Cleveland State | 7 | – | 11 | .389 | 10 | – | 19 | .345 |
| Oakland | 3 | – | 15 | .167 | 6 | – | 24 | .200 |
| Detroit Mercy | 2 | – | 16 | .111 | 4 | – | 25 | .138 |
| UIC | 1 | – | 17 | .056 | 3 | – | 26 | .103 |
† 2019 Horizon League Tournament winner Rankings from AP poll

The 2019 Horizon League women's basketball tournament (also known as Motor City Madness) was the postseason women's basketball tournament for the Horizon League. It was held March 5 through March 12, 2019. Wright State defeated Green Bay in the finals to earn the conference's automatic berth into the 2019 NCAA women's tournament.

== Seeds ==
The top 8 teams participated in the tournament. Teams were seeded by record within the conference, with a tiebreaker system to seed teams with identical conference records.

| Seed | School | Conference record | Overall record | Tiebreaker 1 | Tiebreaker 2 |
|---|---|---|---|---|---|
| 1 | Wright State | 24–6 | 16–2 | | |
| 2 | Green Bay | 20–8 | 15–3 | | |
| 3 | Youngstown State | 13–5 | 21–8 | 1–1 vs. IUPUI | 1–1 vs. WSU |
| 4 | IUPUI | 13–5 | 19–10 | 1–1 vs. YSU | 0–2 vs. WSU |
| 5 | Northern Kentucky | 10–8 | 11–17 | 1–1 vs. MIL | 1–1 vs. IUPUI |
| 6 | Milwaukee | 10–8 | 15–14 | 1–1 vs. NKU | 0–2 vs. IUPUI |
| 7 | Cleveland State | 7–11 | 10–19 | | |
| 8 | Oakland | 3–15 | 6–23 | | |

== Schedule ==
| Game | Time | Matchup | Score | Television |
Quarterfinals – Tuesday, March 5
| 1 | 5:30 pm | No. 8 Oakland at No. 1 Wright State | 60–83 | ESPN+ |
| 2 | 8:00 pm | No. 5 Northern Kentucky at No. 4 IUPUI | 44–60 | ESPN+ |
Quarterfinals – Wednesday, March 6
| 3 | 7:00 pm | No. 7 Cleveland State at No. 2 Green Bay | 30–73 | ESPN+ |
| 4 | 8:00 pm | No. 6 Milwaukee at No. 3 Youngstown State | 58–64 | ESPN+ |
Semifinals – Monday, March 11
| 5 | 1:00 pm | No. 4 IUPUI vs. No. 1 Wright State | 51–60 | ESPN+ |
| 6 | 3:30 pm | No. 3 Youngstown State vs. No. 2 Green Bay | 53–55 | ESPN+ |
Finals – Tuesday, March 12
| 7 | 12:00 pm | No. 2 Green Bay vs. No. 1 Wright State | 52–55 | ESPNU |
All game times in Eastern Time Zone. Rankings denote tournament seed

== Bracket ==
Quarterfinals; Tuesday/Wednesday, March 5/6; ESPN+
1 | Wright State | 83
8 | Oakland | 60
4 | IUPUI | 60
5 | Northern Kentucky | 44
2 | Green Bay | 73
7 | Cleveland State | 30
3 | Youngstown State | 64
6 | Milwaukee | 58

Semifinals; Monday, March 11; ESPN+
1 | Wright State | 60
4 | IUPUI | 51
2 | Green Bay | 55
3 | Youngstown State | 53

Finals; Tuesday, March 12; ESPNU
1 | Wright State | 55
2 | Green Bay | 52
